= Macedonian football clubs in European competitions =

North Macedonia's football clubs have participated in European football competitions since 1961. Before 1992 North Macedonia was a part of Yugoslavia. Therefore, Macedonian teams represented this country and did not always have a guaranteed spot in European competitions.

All statistics and records are accurate as of 7 July 2022.

== Statistics ==
- Most European Cup/Champions League competitions appeared in: 8 – Vardar
- Most UEFA Cup/Europa League competitions appeared in: 11 – Vardar
- Most Conference League competitions appeared in: 4 – Shkëndija
- Most Cup Winners' Cup competitions appeared in: 2 – Sloga Jugomagnat & Vardar
- Most Intertoto Cup competitions appeared in: 5 – Pobeda
- Most competitions appeared in overall: 22 – Vardar
- First match played: Dunfermline Athletic 5–0 Vardar (1961–62 Cup Winners' Cup R1)
- Most matches played: 72 – Vardar
- Most match wins: 21 – Rabotnički
- Most match draws: 17 – Vardar
- Most match losses: 39 – Vardar
- Biggest win (match): 6 goals
  - Rabotnički 6–0 Skonto (2005–06 UEFA Champions League QR1)
  - Rabotnički 6–0 Lusitanos (2010–11 UEFA Europa League QR1)
  - Rabotnički 6–0 Tre Penne (2017–18 UEFA Europa League QR1)
- Biggest win (aggregate): 11 goals
  - Rabotnički 11–0 Lusitanos (2010–11 UEFA Europa League QR1)
- Biggest defeat (match): 7 goals
  - Bastia 7–0 Makedonija GP (1998 UEFA Intertoto Cup R2)
- Biggest defeat (aggregate): 11 goals
  - Bashkimi 0–11 Maccabi Petah Tikva (2005–06 UEFA Cup QR2)

As of 8 August 2018.

=== UEFA coefficient and ranking ===
For the 2018–19 UEFA competitions, the associations will be allocated places according to their 2017 UEFA country coefficients, which will take into account their performance in European competitions from 2012–13 to 2016–17. In the 2017 rankings that will be used for the 2018–19 European competitions, Macedonia's coefficient points total is 5.625. After earning a score of 1.250 during the 2016–17 European campaign, Macedonia is ranked by UEFA as the 42nd best association in Europe out of 54.

- 40 Georgia 6.375
- 41 Latvia 6.125
- 42 North Macedonia 5.625
- 43 Estonia 5.250
- 44 Montenegro 5.250
  - Full list

=== UEFA country coefficient history ===
(As of 23 July 2019), Source: Bert Kassies website.

Accumulated	Valid	Rank	Movement	Coefficient	Change
1994–95 to 1998–99	2000–01	35	Steady	4.915	Steady
1995–96 to 1999–00	2001–02	36	▼ –1	5.081	▲ +0.166
1996–97 to 2000–01	2002–03	37	▼ –1	3.497	▼ –1.584
1997–98 to 2001–02	2003–04	38	▼ –1	2.997	▼ –0.500
1998–99 to 2002–03	2004–05	37	▲ +1	3.497	▲ +0.500
1999–00 to 2003–04	2005–06	35	▲ +2	4.830	▲ +1.333
2000–01 to 2004–05	2006–07	37	▼ –2	4.497	▼ –0.333
2001–02 to 2005–06	2007–08	36	▲ +1	5.331	▲ +0.834
2002–03 to 2006–07	2008–09	38	▼ –2	5.831	▲ +0.500
2003–04 to 2007–08	2009–10	36	▲ +2	6.331	▲ +0.500
2004–05 to 2008–09	2010–11	40	▼ –4	5.165	▼ –1.166
2005–06 to 2009–10	2011–12	40	Steady	5.332	▲ +0.167
2006–07 to 2010–11	2012–13	39	▲ +1	5.207	▼ –0.125
2007–08 to 2011–12	2013–14	39	Steady	5.666	▲ +0.459
2008–09 to 2012–13	2014–15	42	▼ –2	5.250	▼ –0.416
2009–10 to 2013–14	2015–16	42	Steady	5.520	▲ +0.270
2010–11 to 2014–15	2016–17	39	▲ +3	5.875	▲ +0.355
2011–12 to 2015–16	2017–18	40	▼ –1	6.000	▲ +0.125
2012–13 to 2016–17	2018–19	42	▼ –2	5.625	▼ –0.375
2013–14 to 2017–18	2019–20	37	▲ +5	7.500	▲ +1.875
2013–14 to 2018–19	2020–21	34	▲ +3	8.000	▲ +0.500
2014–15 to 2019–20	2021–22	39	▼ –5	7.375	▼ –0.625

== Appearances in UEFA competitions ==
As of 2 April 2026

Club	UEFA Champions League (includes European Cup)					UEFA Europa League (includes UEFA Cup)					UEFA Europa Conference League					UEFA Cup Winners' Cup					UEFA Intertoto Cup					Total					First Appearance	Last Appearance
Club	App.	P	W	D	L	App.	P	W	D	L	App.	P	W	D	L	App.	P	W	D	L	App.	P	W	D	L						First Appearance	Last Appearance
Vardar	8	24	5	8	11	13	38	7	9	22	1	4	2	1	1	2	4	1	0	3	1	6	3	0	3	25	76	18	18	40	1961–62 CWC	2018–19 UEL
Rabotnički	4	14	3	6	5	10	44	18	8	18	1	2	0	0	2	0	0	0	0	0	0	0	0	0	0	15	60	21	14	25	2000–01 UC	2025-26 UECL
Pobeda	2	4	0	2	2	3	8	3	1	4	0	0	0	0	0	0	0	0	0	0	5	20	8	5	7	9	32	11	8	13	1997–98 UC	2007–08 UCL
Sileks	3	5	1	1	3	5	9	2	1	6	1	4	1	1	2	1	4	1	1	2	1	2	0	0	2	12	24	5	4	15	1995–96 CWC	2025-26 UECL
Shkëndija	4	18	6	2	10	8	31	12	6	13	5	20	6	3	11	0	0	0	0	0	0	0	0	0	0	17	69	24	11	34	2011–12 UCL	2025-26 UECL
Sloga Jugomagnat	3	10	1	3	6	2	4	0	1	3	0	0	0	0	0	2	4	0	0	4	0	0	0	0	0	7	18	1	4	13	1996–97 CWC	2004–05 UC
Renova	1	2	0	0	2	4	12	5	1	6	0	0	0	0	0	0	0	0	0	0	1	4	1	1	2	6	18	6	2	10	2008 UIC	2020–21 UEL
Metalurg	0	0	0	0	0	5	16	2	6	8	0	0	0	0	0	0	0	0	0	0	0	0	0	0	0	5	16	2	6	8	2010–11 UEL	2014–15 UEL
Pelister	0	0	0	0	0	3	6	1	1	4	0	0	0	0	0	0	0	0	0	0	1	6	3	1	2	4	12	4	2	6	2000 UIC	2017–18 UEL
Makedonija GP	1	2	0	0	2	2	4	0	1	3	2	4	0	1	3	0	0	0	0	0	2	8	3	1	4	7	18	3	3	12	1998 UIC	2023-24 UECL
Shkupi	1	4	1	1	2	4	5	0	2	5	3	10	2	2	6	0	0	0	0	0	0	0	0	0	0	8	19	3	5	13	2018–19 UEL	2023–24 UECL
Cementarnica	0	0	0	0	0	1	4	0	2	2	0	0	0	0	0	0	0	0	0	0	2	6	3	1	2	3	10	3	3	4	1999 UIC	2003–04 UC
Teteks	0	0	0	0	0	2	6	1	2	3	0	0	0	0	0	0	0	0	0	0	0	0	0	0	0	2	6	1	2	3	2010–11 UEL	2013–14 UEL
Turnovo	0	0	0	0	0	2	6	0	3	3	0	0	0	0	0	0	0	0	0	0	0	0	0	0	0	2	6	0	3	3	2013–14 UEL	2014–15 UEL
Belasica	0	0	0	0	0	2	4	0	1	3	0	0	0	0	0	0	0	0	0	0	0	0	0	0	0	2	4	0	1	3	2002–03 UC	2003–04 UC
Milano	0	0	0	0	0	2	4	0	0	4	0	0	0	0	0	0	0	0	0	0	0	0	0	0	0	2	4	0	0	4	2008–09 UC	2009–10 UEL
Bashkimi	0	0	0	0	0	1	3	0	1	2	0	0	0	0	0	0	0	0	0	0	0	0	0	0	0	1	3	0	1	2	2005–06 UC	2005–06 UC
AP Brera	0	0	0	0	0	1	2	0	0	2	1	2	0	0	2	0	0	0	0	0	0	0	0	0	0	2	4	0	0	4	2019–20 UEL	2022-23 UECL
Struga	2	4	0	1	3	0	0	0	0	0	3	10	4	1	5	0	0	0	0	0	0	0	0	0	0	5	14	4	2	8	2021–22 UECL	2024-25 UECL
Total (18)	—	73	13	21	38	—	205	50	45	109	—	0	0	0	0	—	12	2	1	9	—	52	21	9	22	—	343	85	76	178		

App. = Appearances; P = Matches played; W = Matches won; D = Matches drawn; L = Matches lost; UCL = UEFA Champions League; UC = UEFA Cup; UEL = UEFA Europa League; UECL = UEFA Europa Conference League; CWC = UEFA Cup Winners' Cup; UIC = UEFA Intertoto Cup.

== Competitions ==
=== Active ===
==== European Cup/Champions League ====
Season	Club	Round	Opponent	Home	Away	Agg.
1987–88	Vardar	R1	(Portugal) FC Porto	0–3	0–3	0–6
1997–98	Sileks	QR1	(Israel) Beitar Jerusalem	1–0	0–3	1–3
1998–99	Sileks	QR1	(Belgium) Club Brugge	0–0	1–2	1–2
1999–2000	Sloga Jugomagnat	QR1	(Azerbaijan) Kapaz	1–0	1–2	2–2 (a)
1999–2000	Sloga Jugomagnat	QR2	(Denmark) Brøndby	0–1	0–1	0–2
2000–01	Sloga Jugomagnat	QR1	(Republic of Ireland) Shelbourne	0–1	1–1	1–2
2001–02	Sloga Jugomagnat	QR1	(Lithuania) FBK Kaunas	0–0	1–1	1–1 (a)
2001–02	Sloga Jugomagnat	QR2	(Romania) Steaua București	1–2	0–3	1–5
2002–03	Vardar	QR1	(Luxembourg) F91 Dudelange	3–0	1–1	4–1
2002–03	Vardar	QR2	(Poland) Legia Warsaw	1–3	1–1	2–4
2003–04	Vardar	QR1	(Wales) Barry Town	3–0	1–2	3–2
2003–04	Vardar	QR2	(Russia) CSKA Moscow	1–1	2–1	3–2
2003–04	Vardar	QR3	(Czech Republic) Sparta Prague	2–3	2–2	4–5
2004–05	Pobeda	QR1	(Armenia) Pyunik	1–3	1–1	2–4
2005–06	Rabotnički	QR1	(Latvia) Skonto	6–0	0–1	6–1
2005–06	Rabotnički	QR2	(Russia) Lokomotiv Moscow	1–1	0–2	1–3
2006–07	Rabotnički	QR1	(Luxembourg) F91 Dudelange	0–0	1–0	1–0
2006–07	Rabotnički	QR2	(Hungary) Debrecen	4–1	1–1	5–2
2006–07	Rabotnički	QR3	(France) Lille	0–1	0–3	0–4
2007–08	Pobeda	QR1	(Estonia) Levadia	0–1	0–0	0–1
2008–09	Rabotnički	QR1	(Azerbaijan) Inter Baku	1–1	0–0	1–1 (a)
2009–10	Makedonija GP	QR2	(Belarus) BATE Borisov	0–2	0–2	0–4
2010–11	Renova	QR2	(Cyprus) Omonia	0–2	0–3	0–5
2011–12	Shkëndija	QR2	(Serbia) Partizan	0–1	0–4	0–5
2012–13	Vardar	QR2	(Belarus) BATE Borisov	0–0	2–3	2–3
2013–14	Vardar	QR2	(Romania) Steaua București	1–2	0–3	1–5
2014–15	Rabotnički	QR2	(Finland) HJK Helsinki	0–0	1–2	1–2
2015–16	Vardar	QR2	(Cyprus) APOEL	1–1	0–0	1–1 (a)
2016–17	Vardar	QR2	(Croatia) Dinamo Zagreb	1–2	2–3	3–5
2017–18	Vardar	QR2	(Sweden) Malmö	3–1	1–1	4–2
2017–18	Vardar	QR3	(Denmark) Copenhagen	1–0	1–4	2–4
2018–19	Shkëndija	QR1	(Wales) The New Saints	5–0	0–4	5–4
2018–19	Shkëndija	QR2	(Moldova) Sheriff Tiraspol	1–0	0–0	1–0
2018–19	Shkëndija	QR3	(Austria) Red Bull Salzburg	0–1	0–3	0–4
2019–20	Shkëndija	QR1	(Estonia) Nõmme Kalju	1–2	1–0	2–2 (a)
2020–21	Sileks	QR1	(Azerbaijan) Qarabağ	—N/a	0–4	—N/a
2021–22	Shkëndija	QR1	(Slovenia) NŠ Mura	0–1	0–5	0–6
2022–23	Shkupi	QR1	(Gibraltar) Lincoln Red Imps	3–0	0–2	3–2
2022–23	Shkupi	QR2	(Croatia) Dinamo Zagreb	0–1	2–2	2–3
2023–24	Struga	QR1	(Lithuania) Žalgiris	1–2	0–0	1–2
2024–25	Struga	QR1	(Slovakia) Slovan Bratislava	1–2	2–4	3–6
2025–26	Shkëndija	QR1	(Wales) The New Saints	2–1 (aet)	0–0	2–1
2025–26	Shkëndija	QR2	(Romania) FCSB	1–0	2–1	3–1
2025–26	Shkëndija	QR3	(Azerbaijan) Qarabağ	0–1	1–5	1–6
2026–27	Vardar	QR1	(Finland) KuPS	0–2	3–2 (aet)	3–4

==== UEFA Cup/Europa League ====
Season	Club	Round	Opponent	Home	Away	Agg.
1985–86	Vardar	R1	(Romania) Dinamo București	1–0	1–2	2–2 (a)
1985–86	Vardar	R2	(Scotland) Dundee United	1–1	0–2	1–3
1994–95	Vardar	QR	(Hungary) Békéscsaba	1–1	0–1	1–2
1995–96	Vardar	QR	(Georgia (country)) Samtredia	1–0	2–0	3–0
1995–96	Vardar	R1	(France) Bordeaux	0–2	1–1	1–3
1996–97	Sileks	PR	(Iceland) ÍA Akranes	1–0	0–2	1–2
1996–97	Vardar	PR	(Slovenia) Gorica	2–1	1–0	3–1
1996–97	Vardar	QR	(Sweden) Halmstad	0–1	0–0	0–1
1997–98	Pobeda	QR1	(Poland) Odra Wodzisław	2–1	0–3	2–4
1998–99	Sloga Jugomagnat	QR1	(Romania) Oțelul Galați	1–1	0–3	1–4
1999–2000	Sileks	QR	(Ukraine) Shakhtar Donetsk	2–1	1–3	3–4
1999–2000	Vardar	QR	(Poland) Legia Warsaw	0–5	0–4	0–9
2000–01	Pobeda	QR	(Romania) Universitatea Craiova	1–0	1–1	2–1
2000–01	Pobeda	R1	(Italy) Parma	0–2	0–4	0–6
2000–01	Rabotnički	QR	(Ukraine) Vorskla Poltava	0–2	0–2	0–4
2001–02	Pelister	QR	(Switzerland) St. Gallen	0–2	3–2	3–4
2001–02	Vardar	QR	(Belgium) Standard Liège	0–3	1–3	1–6
2002–03	Belasica	QR	(Portugal) Leixões	2–2	1–2	3–4
2002–03	Pobeda	QR	(Denmark) Midtjylland	2–0	0–3 (aet)	2–3
2003–04	Belasica	QR	(Slovenia) Celje	2–7	0–5	2–12
2003–04	Cementarnica	QR	(Poland) GKS Katowice	0–0	1–1	1–1 (a)
2003–04	Cementarnica	R1	(France) Lens	0–1	0–5	0–6
2003–04	Vardar	R1	(Italy) Roma	1–1	0–4	1–5
2004–05	Sileks	QR1	(Slovenia) Maribor	0–1	1–1	1–2
2004–05	Sloga Jugomagnat	QR1	(Cyprus) Omonia	1–4	0–4	1–8
2005–06	Bashkimi	QR1	(Bosnia and Herzegovina) Žepče	3–0^{1}	1–1	4–1
2005–06	Bashkimi	QR2	(Israel) Maccabi Petah Tikva	0–5	0–6	0–11
2005–06	Vardar	QR1	(Albania) Elbasani	0–0	1–1	1–1 (a)
2005–06	Vardar	QR2	(Romania) Rapid București	1–1	0–3	1–4
2006–07	Makedonija GP	QR1	(Bulgaria) Lokomotiv Sofia	1–1	0–2	1–3
2006–07	Rabotnički	R1	(Switzerland) Basel	0–1	2–6	2–7
2006–07	Vardar	QR1	(Belgium) Roeselare	1–2	1–5	2–7
2007–08	Rabotnički	QR1	(Slovenia) Gorica	2–1	2–1	4–2
2007–08	Rabotnički	QR2	(Bosnia and Herzegovina) Zrinjski	0–0	2–1	2–1
2007–08	Rabotnički	R1	(England) Bolton Wanderers	1–1	0–1	1–2
2007–08	Vardar	QR1	(Cyprus) Anorthosis	0–1	0–1	0–2
2008–09	Milano	QR1	(Cyprus) Omonia	1–2	0–2	1–4
2008–09	Pelister	QR1	(Cyprus) APOEL	0–0	0–1	0–1
2009–10	Milano	QR2	(Croatia) Slaven Belupo	0–4	2–8	2–12
2009–10	Rabotnički	QR2	(Northern Ireland) Crusaders	4–2	1–1	5–3
2009–10	Rabotnički	QR3	(Denmark) Odense	3–4	0–3	3–7
2009–10	Renova	QR1	(Belarus) Dinamo Minsk	1–1	1–2	2–3
2010–11	Metalurg	QR1	(Azerbaijan) Qarabağ	1–1	1–4	1–5
2010–11	Rabotnički	QR1	(Andorra) Lusitanos	5–0	6–0	11–0
2010–11	Rabotnički	QR2	(Armenia) Mika	1–0	0–0	1–0
2010–11	Rabotnički	QR3	(England) Liverpool	0–2	0–2	0–4
2010–11	Teteks	QR2	(Latvia) Ventspils	3–1	0–0	3–1
2010–11	Teteks	QR3	(Sweden) Elfsborg	0–2	1–5	1–7
2011–12	Metalurg	QR2	(Bulgaria) Lokomotiv Sofia	0–0	2–3	2–3
2011–12	Rabotnički	QR1	(Estonia) Narva Trans	3–0	4–1	7–1
2011–12	Rabotnički	QR2	(San Marino) Juvenes/Dogana	3–0	1–0	4–0
2011–12	Rabotnički	QR3	(Cyprus) Anorthosis	1–2	2–0	3–2
2011–12	Rabotnički	PO	(Italy) Lazio	1–3	0–6	1–9
2011–12	Renova	QR1	(Northern Ireland) Glentoran	2–1	1–2	3–3 (2–3 p)
2012–13	Metalurg	QR1	(Malta) Birkirkara	0–0	2–2	2–2 (a)
2012–13	Metalurg	QR2	(Poland) Ruch Chorzów	0–3	1–3	1–6
2012–13	Renova	QR1	(San Marino) Libertas	4–0	4–0	8–0
2012–13	Renova	QR2	(Belarus) Gomel	0–2	1–0	1–2
2012–13	Shkëndija	QR1	(Northern Ireland) Portadown	0–0	1–2	1–2
2013–14	Metalurg	QR1	(Azerbaijan) Qarabağ	0–1	0–1	0–2
2013–14	Teteks	QR1	(Armenia) Pyunik	1–1	0–1	1–2
2013–14	Turnovo	QR1	(Lithuania) Sūduva	2–2	2–2	4–4 (5–4 p)
2013–14	Turnovo	QR2	(Croatia) Hajduk Split	1–1	1–2	2–3
2014–15	Metalurg	QR1	(Andorra) UE Santa Coloma	2–0	3–0	5–0
2014–15	Metalurg	QR2	(Bosnia and Herzegovina) Željezničar	0–0	2–2	2–2 (a)
2014–15	Metalurg	QR3	(Cyprus) Omonia	0–1	0–3	0–4
2014–15	Shkëndija	QR1	(Moldova) Zimbru	2–1	0–2	2–3
2014–15	Turnovo	QR1	(Georgia (country)) Chikhura	0–1	1–3	1–4
2015–16	Rabotnički	QR1	(Estonia) Flora	2–0	0–1	2–1
2015–16	Rabotnički	QR2	(Latvia) Jelgava	2–0	0–1	2–1
2015–16	Rabotnički	QR3	(Turkey) Trabzonspor	1–0	1–1 (aet)	2–1
2015–16	Rabotnički	PO	(Russia) Rubin Kazan	1–1	0–1	1–2
2015–16	Renova	QR1	(Moldova) Dacia	1–4	0–1	1–5
2015–16	Shkëndija	QR1	(Scotland) Aberdeen	1–1	0–0	1–1 (a)
2016–17	Rabotnički	QR1	(Montenegro) Budućnost Podgorica	1–1	0–1	1–2
2016–17	Shkëndija	QR1	(Poland) Cracovia	2–0	2–1	4–1
2016–17	Shkëndija	QR2	(Azerbaijan) Neftçi	1–0	0–0	1–0
2016–17	Shkëndija	QR3	(Czech Republic) Mladá Boleslav	2–0	0–1	2–1
2016–17	Shkëndija	PO	(Belgium) Gent	0–4	1–2	1–6
2016–17	Sileks	QR1	(Liechtenstein) Vaduz	1–2	1–3	2–5
2017–18	Pelister	QR1	(Poland) Lech Poznań	0–3	0–4	0–7
2017–18	Rabotnički	QR1	(San Marino) Tre Penne	6–0	1–0	7–0
2017–18	Rabotnički	QR2	(Belarus) Dinamo Minsk	1–1	0–3	1–4
2017–18	Shkëndija	QR1	(Moldova) Dacia	3–0	4–0	7–0
2017–18	Shkëndija	QR2	(Finland) HJK Helsinki	3–1	1–1	4–2
2017–18	Shkëndija	QR3	(Lithuania) Trakai	3–0	1–2	4–2
2017–18	Shkëndija	PO	(Italy) Milan	0–1	0–6	0–7
2017–18	Vardar	PO	(Turkey) Fenerbahçe	2–0	2–1	4–1
2017–18	Vardar	GS	(Spain) Real Sociedad	0–6	0–3	4th out of 4
2017–18	Vardar	GS	(Norway) Rosenborg	1–1	1–3	4th out of 4
2017–18	Vardar	GS	(Russia) Zenit St. Petersburg	0–5	1–2	4th out of 4
2018–19	Rabotnički	QR1	(Hungary) Honvéd	2–1	0–4	2–5
2018–19	Shkupi	QR1	(Scotland) Rangers	0–0	0–2	0–2
2018–19	Shkëndija	PO	(Norway) Rosenborg	0–2	1–3	1–5
2018–19	Vardar	QR1	(Armenia) Pyunik	0–2	0–1	0–3
2019–20	Akademija Pandev	QR1	(Bosnia and Herzegovina) Zrinjski Mostar	0–3	0–3	0–6
2019–20	Makedonija GP	QR1	(Armenia) Alashkert	0–3	1–3	1–6
2019–20	Shkëndija	QR2	(Luxembourg) F91 Dudelange	1–2	1–1	2–3
2019–20	Shkupi	QR1	(Armenia) Pyunik	1–2	3–3	4–5
2020–21	Renova	QR1	(Armenia) Alashkert	—N/a	1–0	—N/a
2020–21	Renova	QR2	(Croatia) Hajduk Split	0–1	—N/a	—N/a
2020–21	Shkëndija	QR1	(Azerbaijan) Sumgayit	—N/a	2–0	—N/a
2020–21	Shkëndija	QR2	(Romania) Botoșani	—N/a	1–0	—N/a
2020–21	Shkëndija	QR3	(England) Tottenham Hotspur	1–3	—N/a	—N/a
2020–21	Shkupi	QR1	(Azerbaijan) Neftçi	—N/a	1–2	—N/a
2020–21	Sileks	QR2	(Kosovo) Drita	0–2	—N/a	—N/a
2022–23	Shkupi	QR3	(Republic of Ireland) Shamrock Rovers	1–2	1–3	2–5
2025–26	Shkëndija	PO	(Bulgaria) Ludogorets	2–1	1–4 (aet)	3–5

^{1} Game originally finished 0–0, but was later awarded 3–0 for Bashkimi because was Žepče fielded ineligible player.

==== UEFA Conference League ====
Season	Club	Round	Opponent	Home	Away	Agg.
2021–22	Shkupi	QR1	(Kosovo) Llapi	2–0	1–1	3–1
2021–22	Shkupi	QR2	(Portugal) Santa Clara	0–3	0–2	0–5
2021–22	Sileks	QR1	(Moldova) Petrocub Hîncești	1–1	0–1	1–2
2021–22	Struga	QR1	(Latvia) Liepāja	1–4	1–1	2–5
2021–22	Shkëndija	QR2	(Latvia) Riga	0–1	0–2	0–3
2022–23	Akademija Pandev	QR1	(Poland) Lechia Gdańsk	1–2	1–4	2–6
2022–23	Makedonija GP	QR2	(Bulgaria) CSKA Sofia	0–0	0–4	0–4
2022–23	Shkëndija	QR1	(Armenia) Ararat Yerevan	2–0	2–2	4–2
2022–23	Shkëndija	QR2	(Latvia) Valmiera	3–1	2–1	5–2
2022–23	Shkëndija	QR3	(Sweden) AIK	1–1	1–1	2–2 (2–3 p)
2022–23	Shkupi	PO	(Kosovo) Ballkani	1–2	0–1	1–3
2023–24	Makedonija GP	QR1	(Latvia) RFS	0–1	1–4	1–5
2023–24	Shkupi	QR1	(Lithuania) Hegelmann	0–0	5–0	5–0
2023–24	Shkupi	QR2	(Bulgaria) Levski Sofia	0–2	0–1	0-3
2023–24	Shkëndija	QR1	(Wales) Haverfordwest County	1–0	0–1	1–1 (2–3 p)
2023–24	Struga	QR2	(Montenegro) Budućnost Podgorica	1–0	4–3	5–3
2023–24	Struga	QR3	(Luxembourg) Swift Hesperange	3–1	1–2	4–3
2023–24	Struga	PO	(Iceland) Breiðablik	0–1	0–1	0–2
2024–25	Shkëndija	QR1	(Armenia) Noah	1–2	0–2	1–4
2024–25	Tikvesh	QR1	(Iceland) Breiðablik	3–2	1–3	4–5
2024–25	Struga	QR2	(Armenia) Pyunik	2–1	1–3	3–4
2025–26	Rabotnički	QR1	(Belarus) Torpedo-BelAZ Zhodino	0–1	0–3	0–4
2025–26	Shkëndija	LP	(Spain) Rayo Vallecano	—N/a	0–2	22nd out of 36
2025–26	Shkëndija	LP	(Republic of Ireland) Shelbourne	1–0	—N/a	22nd out of 36
2025–26	Shkëndija	LP	(Poland) Jagiellonia Białystok	1–1	—N/a	22nd out of 36
2025–26	Shkëndija	LP	(Kosovo) Drita	—N/a	0–1	22nd out of 36
2025–26	Shkëndija	LP	(Slovakia) Slovan Bratislava	2–0	—N/a	22nd out of 36
2025–26	Shkëndija	LP	(Cyprus) AEK Larnaca	—N/a	0–1	22nd out of 36
2025–26	Shkëndija	KPO	(Turkey) Samsunspor	0-1	0-4	0-5
2025–26	Sileks	QR1	(Montenegro) Dečić	2–1	0–2	2–3
2025–26	Vardar	QR1	(San Marino) La Fiorita	3–0	2–2	5–2
2025–26	Vardar	QR2	(Switzerland) Lausanne-Sport	2–1	0–5	2–6
2026–27	Shkëndija	QR1	(Gibraltar) Europa	1–0	5–0	6–0
2026–27	Shkëndija	QR2	(Slovenia) Bravo	3–1	1–2	4–3
2026–27	Shkëndija	QR3	(Scotland) Hibernian	–	–	–
2026–27	Sileks	QR1	(Belarus) Dinamo Minsk	0–1 (aet)	1–0	1–1 (5–6 p)
2026–27	Vardar	QR2	(Latvia) Riga	2–3	2–5 (aet)	4–8

=== Defunct ===
==== Cup Winners' Cup ====
Season	Club	Round	Opponent	Home	Away	Agg.
1961–62	Vardar	R1	(Scotland) Dunfermline Athletic	2–0	0–5	2–5
1995–96	Sileks	QR	(Hungary) Vác FC	3–1	1–1	4–2
1995–96	Sileks	R1	(Germany) Borussia Mönchengladbach	2–3	0–3	3–4
1996–97	Sloga Jugomagnat	QR	(Hungary) Honvéd	0–1	0–1	0–2
1997–98	Sloga Jugomagnat	QR	(Croatia) NK Zagreb	1–2	0–2	1–4
1998–99	Vardar	QR	(Slovakia) Spartak Trnava	0–1	0–2	0–3

==== Intertoto Cup ====
Season	Club	Round	Opponent	Home	Away	Agg.
1998	Makedonija GP	R1	(Slovenia) Olimpija Ljubljana	4–2	1–1	5–3
1998	Makedonija GP	R2	(France) Bastia	1–0	0–7	1–7
1999	Cementarnica	R1	(Georgia (country)) Kolkheti-1913 Poti	4–2	4–0	8–2
1999	Cementarnica	R2	(Russia) Rostselmash	1–1	1–2	2–3
1999	Pobeda	R1	(Slovakia) OD Trenčín	3–1	1–3	4–4 (4–3 p)
1999	Pobeda	R2	(Italy) Perugia	0–0	0–1	0–1
2000	Pelister	R1	(Luxembourg) Hobscheid	3–1	1–0	4–1
2000	Pelister	R2	(Sweden) Västra Frölunda	3–1	0–0	3–1
2000	Pelister	R3	(Spain) Celta Vigo	1–2	0–3	1–5
2001	Pobeda	R1	(Croatia) NK Zagreb	1–1	2–1	3–2
2001	Pobeda	R2	(Turkey) Rizespor	2–1	2–0	4–1
2001	Pobeda	R3	(Czech Republic) Chmel Blšany	0–1	0–0	0–1
2002	Cementarnica	R1	(Iceland) FH	1–3	2–1	3–4
2003	Pobeda	R1	(Slovakia) Spartak Trnava	2–1	5–1	7–1
2003	Pobeda	R2	(Austria) Pasching	1–1	1–2	2–3
2004	Vardar	R1	(Cyprus) Ethnikos Achna	5–1	5–1	10–2
2004	Vardar	R2	(Belgium) Gent	1–0	0–1	1–1 (4–1 p)
2004	Vardar	R3	(Germany) Schalke 04	1–2	0–5	1–7
2005	Pobeda	R1	(Serbia and Montenegro) Smederevo	2–1	1–0	3–1
2005	Pobeda	R2	(Germany) Hamburg	1–4	1–4	2–8
2005	Sileks	R1	(Israel) Beitar Jerusalem	1–2	3–4	4–6
2006	Pobeda	R1	(Romania) Farul Constanța	2–2	0–2	2–4
2007	Makedonija GP	R1	(Cyprus) Ethnikos Achna	2–0	0–1	2–1
2007	Makedonija GP	R2	(Bulgaria) Cherno More	0–4	0–3	0–7
2008	Renova	R1	(Croatia) Rijeka	2–0	0–0	2–0
2008	Renova	R2	(Israel) Bnei Sakhnin	1–2	0–1	1–3

==== Balkans Cup ====
Season	Club	Round	Opponent	Home	Away	Agg.
1964–66	Vardar	GS	(Bulgaria) Spartak Plovdiv	0–3	1–4	4th out of 4
1964–66	Vardar	GS	(Romania) Farul Constanța	0–4	0–1	4th out of 4
1964–66	Vardar	GS	(Greece) Olympiacos	2–2	0–1	4th out of 4
1966–67	Vardar	GS	(Greece) AEK Athens	1–1	0–1	4th out of 4
1966–67	Vardar	GS	(Bulgaria) Lokomotiv Sofia	1–1	0–1	4th out of 4
1966–67	Vardar	GS	(Romania) Farul Constanța	4–0	0–2	4th out of 4
1972	Vardar	GS	(Greece) Kavala	4–1	0–1	1st out of 3
1972	Vardar	GS	(Albania) Shkëndija Tiranë	1–1	1–1	1st out of 3
1972	Vardar	Final	(Bulgaria) Trakia Plovdiv	4–0	0–5	4–5
1974	Vardar	GS	(Albania) Partizani Tirana	2–0	1–2	1st out of 3
1974	Vardar	GS	(Greece) Larissa	2–0	3–0	1st out of 3
1974	Vardar	Final	(Bulgaria) Akademik Sofia	0–0	1–2	1–2

==== Mitropa Cup ====
Season	Club	Round	Opponent	Home	Away	Agg.
1967–68	Vardar	R16	(Austria) LASK Linz	2–1	0–0	2–1
1967–68	Vardar	QF	(Italy) Cagliari	1–0	1–0	2–0
1967–68	Vardar	SF	(Czechoslovakia) Spartak Trnava	2–2	1–2	3–4
1968–69	Vardar	R16	(Austria) Admira	2–2	0–3	2–5
1969–70	Vardar	R16	(Hungary) Vasas	2–3	1–1	3–4

== Record by country of opposition ==
Updated on 31 July 2021.

Country	Pld	W	D	L	GF	GA	GD	Win%
Albania	6	1	4	1	6	5	+1	16.67
Andorra	4	4	0	0	16	0	+16	100.00
Armenia	14	3	4	7	11	20	−9	21.43
Austria	8	1	3	4	6	13	−7	12.50
Azerbaijan	13	3	4	6	9	16	−7	23.08
Belarus	10	1	3	6	6	16	−10	10.00
Belgium	10	1	1	8	6	22	−16	10.00
Bosnia and Herzegovina	7	3	2	2	5	9	−4	42.86
Bulgaria	14	1	4	9	10	29	−19	7.14
Croatia	13	2	3	8	13	27	−14	15.38
Cyprus	20	4	3	13	18	30	−12	20.00
Czech Republic	6	1	2	3	6	7	−1	16.67
Czechoslovakia	2	0	1	1	3	4	−1	0.00
Denmark	8	2	0	6	6	16	−10	25.00
England	4	0	1	3	1	6	−5	0.00
Estonia	8	4	1	3	11	5	+6	50.00
Finland	4	1	2	1	5	4	+1	25.00
France	8	1	1	6	2	20	−18	12.50
Georgia	6	4	0	2	12	6	+6	66.67
Germany	6	0	0	6	5	21	−16	0.00
Gibraltar	1	1	0	0	3	0	+3	100.00
Greece	8	3	2	3	14	7	+7	37.50
Hungary	12	4	4	4	13	19	−6	33.33
Iceland	4	2	0	2	4	6	−2	50.00
Republic of Ireland	2	0	1	1	1	2	−1	0.00
Israel	8	1	0	7	6	23	−17	12.50
Italy	12	2	2	8	4	28	−24	16.67
Kosovo	3	1	1	1	3	3	+0	33.33
Latvia	10	3	2	5	13	11	+2	30.00
Liechtenstein	2	0	0	2	2	5	−3	0.00
Lithuania	6	1	4	1	9	7	+2	16.67
Luxembourg	8	4	3	1	11	5	+6	50.00
Malta	2	0	2	0	2	2	+0	0.00
Moldova	10	4	2	4	12	10	+2	40.00
Montenegro	2	0	1	1	1	2	−1	0.00
Northern Ireland	6	2	2	2	9	8	+1	33.33
Norway	4	0	1	3	3	9	−6	0.00
Poland	15	3	3	9	11	36	−25	20.00
Portugal	6	0	1	5	3	15	−12	0.00
Romania	15	3	4	8	11	25	−14	20.00
Russia	10	1	4	5	9	16	−7	10.00
San Marino	6	6	0	0	19	0	+19	100.00
Scotland	8	1	4	3	4	11	−7	12.50
Serbia	2	0	0	2	0	5	−5	0.00
Serbia and Montenegro	2	2	0	0	3	1	+2	100.00
Slovakia	6	3	0	3	11	8	+3	50.00
Slovenia	12	5	2	5	15	26	−11	41.67
Spain	4	0	0	4	1	14	−13	0.00
Sweden	8	2	3	3	8	11	−3	25.00
Switzerland	4	1	0	3	5	11	−6	25.00
Turkey	6	5	1	0	10	3	+7	83.33
Ukraine	4	1	0	3	3	8	−5	25.00
Wales	4	2	0	2	9	6	+3	50.00
