= PFC Botev Plovdiv in European football =

This article lists the international competition statistics of PFC Botev Plovdiv, a Bulgarian professional football club based in Plovdiv, Bulgaria. The records cover matches played in UEFA competitions, including the UEFA Europa League, UEFA Cup Winners' Cup, UEFA Champions League, UEFA Europa Conference League, and the Intertoto Cup, as well as earlier competitions such as the Inter-Cities Fairs Cup and the Balkans Cup.

== Total statistics ==
Competition	S	P	W	D	L	GF	GA	GD
Inter-Cities Fairs Cup	2	4	1	0	3	4	9	5
Balkans Cup	2	10	4	1	5	25	25	0
UEFA Cup Winners' Cup	3	12	6	2	4	23	18	+ 5
Intertoto Cup	2	10	3	1	6	19	17	+ 2
European Cup / UEFA Champions League	2	4	1	0	3	5	8	3
UEFA Cup / UEFA Europa League	11	38	14	12	12	58	48	+ 10
UEFA Europa Conference League	2	4	1	1	2	2	5	3
Total	24	82	30	17	35	136	130	+ 6

== Statistics by country ==
Country	Club	P	W	D	L	GF	GA	GD
Albania	Partizani Tirana	2	2	0	0	4	1	+ 3
Subtotal		2	2	0	0	4	1	+ 3
Austria	St. Pölten	2	1	0	1	2	3	1
Subtotal		2	1	0	1	2	3	1
Belarus / Soviet Union	Dinamo Minsk	2	0	1	1	1	2	1
Subtotal		2	0	1	1	1	2	1
(Bosnia and Herzegovina) BiH / (Socialist Federal Republic of Yugoslavia) SFR Yugoslavia	Velež Mostar	2	0	0	2	7	12	5
(Bosnia and Herzegovina) BiH / (Socialist Federal Republic of Yugoslavia) SFR Yugoslavia	Zrinjski Mostar	4	2	1	1	5	4	+ 1
Subtotal		6	2	1	3	12	16	4
Croatia / (Socialist Federal Republic of Yugoslavia) SFR Yugoslavia	Hajduk Split	2	0	1	1	3	5	2
Subtotal		2	0	1	1	3	5	2
Cyprus	APOEL	2	0	1	1	0	2	2
Subtotal		2	0	1	1	0	2	2
Czech Republic / Czechoslovakia	Vítkovice	2	1	0	1	7	5	+ 2
Subtotal		2	1	0	1	7	5	+ 2
England	Coventry City	2	0	0	2	1	6	5
Subtotal		2	0	0	2	1	6	5
(Georgia (country)) Georgia	Dinamo Tbilisi	2	2	0	0	2	0	+ 2
Subtotal		2	2	0	0	2	0	+ 2
Germany / West Germany	Bayern Munich	2	1	0	1	3	4	1
Germany / West Germany	Eintracht Braunschweig	2	0	0	2	0	3	3
Germany / West Germany	Hertha BSC	2	0	1	1	1	2	1
Germany / West Germany	Stuttgart	2	0	2	0	1	1	0
Subtotal		8	1	3	4	5	10	5
Greece	Olympiacos	2	0	0	2	3	8	5
Greece	Panathinaikos	2	0	0	2	1	6	5
Subtotal		4	0	0	4	4	14	10
Israel	Beitar Jerusalem	2	1	1	0	5	1	+ 4
Subtotal		2	1	1	0	5	1	+ 4
Kazakhstan	Astana	2	2	0	0	6	0	+ 6
Subtotal		2	2	0	0	6	0	+ 6
Luxembourg	Union Luxembourg	2	1	1	0	5	1	+ 4
Subtotal		2	1	1	0	5	1	+ 4
Malta	Hibernians	2	2	0	0	10	0	+ 10
Subtotal		2	2	0	0	10	0	+ 10
Portugal	Marítimo	2	0	1	1	0	2	2
Subtotal		2	0	1	1	0	2	2
Republic of Ireland	Shamrock Rovers	2	2	0	0	5	0	+ 5
Subtotal		2	2	0	0	5	0	+ 5
North Macedonia / (Socialist Federal Republic of Yugoslavia) SFR Yugoslavia	Vardar	2	1	0	1	5	4	+ 1
Subtotal		2	1	0	1	5	4	+ 1
Romania	Brașov	2	1	1	0	4	3	+ 1
Romania	Rapid București	4	2	0	2	8	5	+ 3
Romania	Steaua București	2	1	0	1	7	4	+ 3
Romania	Sportul Studențesc	2	1	0	1	5	3	+ 2
Subtotal		10	5	1	4	24	15	+ 9
San Marino	Libertas	2	2	0	0	6	0	+ 6
Subtotal		2	2	0	0	6	0	+ 6
Serbia / (Socialist Federal Republic of Yugoslavia) SFR Yugoslavia	Crvena zvezda	2	0	1	1	2	5	3
Subtotal		2	0	1	1	2	5	3
Slovakia	Dunajská Streda	2	0	0	2	2	7	5
Subtotal		2	0	0	2	2	7	5
Slovenia	Maribor	2	1	1	0	4	3	+ 1
Subtotal		2	1	1	0	4	3	+ 1
Spain	Atlético Madrid	2	0	1	1	1	5	4
Spain	Barcelona	2	1	0	1	2	4	2
Spain	Real Zaragoza	2	1	0	1	3	3	0
Spain	Sevilla	2	0	1	1	1	3	2
Subtotal		8	2	2	4	7	15	8
Sweden	Elfsborg	2	1	1	0	4	0	+ 4
Sweden	Göteborg	2	0	0	2	3	5	2
Subtotal		4	1	1	2	7	5	+ 2
Turkey	Fenerbahçe	2	0	1	1	3	5	2
Turkey	Göztepe	2	1	0	1	4	3	+ 1
Subtotal		4	1	1	2	7	8	1
Total		82	30	17	35	136	130	+ 6

== Statistics by competition ==
=== Inter-Cities Fairs Cup ===
Season	Competition	Round	Club	Home	Away	Aggregate
1968–69	Fairs Cup	1Q	(Spain) Real Zaragoza	3–1	0–2	3–3 (a)
1970–71	Fairs Cup	1Q	(England) Coventry City	1–4	0–2	1–6

=== Balkans Cup ===
Season	Competition	Round	Club	Home	Away	Aggregate
1972	Balkans Cup					
1972	Balkans Cup	Group Stage	(Turkey) Göztepe	3–0	1–3	1st
1972	Balkans Cup	Group Stage	(Romania) Brașov	1–1	3–2	1st
1972	Balkans Cup	Final	(Socialist Federal Republic of Yugoslavia) Vardar	5–0	0–4	5–4
1980–81	Balkans Cup					
1980–81	Balkans Cup	Group Stage	(Romania) Sportul Studențesc	3–0	2–3	1st
1980–81	Balkans Cup	Final	(Socialist Federal Republic of Yugoslavia) Velež Mostar	5–6	2–6	7–12

=== UEFA Cup Winners' Cup ===
Season	Competition	Round	Club	Home	Away	Aggregate
1962–63	UEFA Cup Winners' Cup	PR	(Romania) Steaua București	5–1	2–3	7–4
1962–63	UEFA Cup Winners' Cup	1Q	(Republic of Ireland) Shamrock Rovers	1–0	4–0	5–0
1962–63	UEFA Cup Winners' Cup	Quarter-finals	(Spain) Atlético Madrid	1–1	0–4	1–5
1981–82	UEFA Cup Winners' Cup	1Q	(Spain) Barcelona	1–0	1–4	2–4
1984–85	UEFA Cup Winners' Cup	1Q	Union Luxembourg	4–0	1–1	5–1
1984–85	UEFA Cup Winners' Cup	2Q	(Germany) Bayern Munich	2–0	1–4	3–4

=== Intertoto Cup ===
Season	Competition	Round	Club	Home	Away	Aggregate
1983	Intertoto Cup					
1983	Intertoto Cup	Group Stage	(Czechoslovakia) Vítkovice	5–1	2–4	3rd
1983	Intertoto Cup	Group Stage	(Germany) Eintracht Braunschweig	0–1	0–2	3rd
1983	Intertoto Cup	Group Stage	(Sweden) Elfsborg	4–0	0–0	3rd
1991	Intertoto Cup					3rd
1991	Intertoto Cup	Group Stage	(Czechoslovakia) Dunajská Streda	1–3	1–4	3rd
1991	Intertoto Cup	Group Stage	(Romania) Rapid București	5–0	1–2	3rd

=== European Cup / UEFA Champions League ===
Season	Competition	Round	Club	Home	Away	Aggregate
1967–68	European Cup	1Q	(Romania) Rapid București	2–0	0–2	2–3 (aet)
1985–86	European Cup	1Q	(Sweden) Göteborg	1–2	2–3	3–5

=== UEFA Cup / UEFA Europa League ===
Season	Competition	Round	Club	Home	Away	Aggregate
1978–79	UEFA Cup	1Q	(Germany) Hertha Berlin	1–2	0–0	1–2
1986–87	UEFA Cup	1Q	(Malta) Hibernians	8–0	2–0	10–0
1986–87	UEFA Cup	2Q	(Socialist Federal Republic of Yugoslavia) Hajduk Split	2–2	1–3	3–5
1987–88	UEFA Cup	1Q	(Socialist Federal Republic of Yugoslavia) Crvena zvezda	2–2	0–3	2–5
1988–89	UEFA Cup	1Q	(Soviet Union) Dinamo Minsk	1–2	0–0	1–2
1992–93	UEFA Cup	1Q	(Turkey) Fenerbahçe	2–2	1–3	3–5
1993–94	UEFA Cup	1Q	(Greece) Olympiacos	2–3	1–5	3–8
1995–96	UEFA Cup	1Q	(Georgia (country)) Dinamo Tbilisi	1–0	1–0	2–0
1995–96	UEFA Cup	2Q	(Spain) Sevilla	1–1	0–2	1–3
2013–14	UEFA Europa League	1Q	(Kazakhstan) Astana	5–0	1–0	6–0
2013–14	UEFA Europa League	2Q	(Bosnia and Herzegovina) Zrinjski Mostar	2–0	1–1	3–1
2013–14	UEFA Europa League	3Q	(Germany) VfB Stuttgart	1–1	0–0	1–1 (a)
2014–15	UEFA Europa League	1Q	(San Marino) Libertas	4–0	2–0	6–0
2014–15	UEFA Europa League	2Q	(Austria) St. Pölten	2–1	0–2	2–3
2017–18	UEFA Europa League	1Q	(Albania) Partizani	1–0	3–1	4–1
2017–18	UEFA Europa League	2Q	(Israel) Beitar Jerusalem	4–0	1–1	5–1
2017–18	UEFA Europa League	3Q	(Portugal) Marítimo	0–0	0–2	0–2
2024–25	UEFA Europa League	1Q	(Slovenia) Maribor	2–1	2–2	4−3
2024–25	UEFA Europa League	2Q	(Greece) Panathinaikos	0–4	1–2	1–6

=== UEFA Europa Conference League ===
Season	Competition	Round	Club	Home	Away	Aggregate
2022–23	UEFA Europa Conference League	2Q	(Cyprus) APOEL	0–0	0–2	0–2
2024–25	UEFA Europa Conference League	3Q	(Bosnia and Herzegovina) Zrinjski Mostar	2–1	0–2	2–3
