= 1967–68 European Cup =

European football tournament

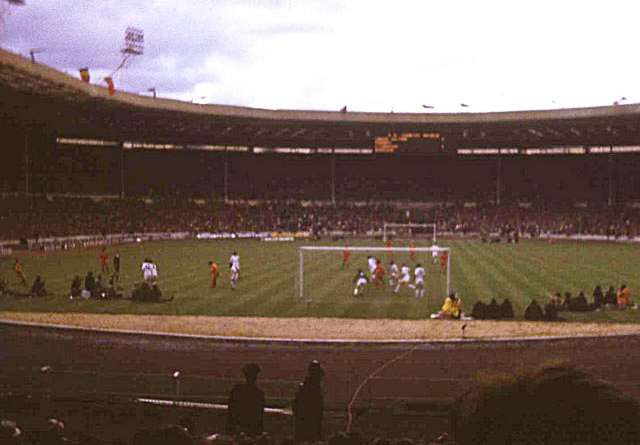
- The Wembley Stadium in London hosted the final.

Tournament details
- Dates: 20 September 1967 – 29 May 1968
- Teams: 32 (31 competed)

Final positions
- Champions: (England) Manchester United (1st title)
- Runners-up: (Portugal) Benfica

Tournament statistics
- Matches played: 60
- Goals scored: 162 (2.7 per match)
- Attendance: 2,059,590 (34,327 per match)
- Top scorer(s): Eusébio (Benfica); 6 goals

The 1967–68 European Cup was the 13th European Cup, UEFA's premier club football tournament. The competition was won by Manchester United, who beat Benfica 4–1 in the final at Wembley Stadium, London. The European Cup title marked the tenth year since the Munich air disaster, in which eight United players were killed and their manager, Matt Busby, was left close to death, the day after earning a place in the semi-finals of the 1957–58 competition. It was also the first time an English side had won the trophy.

The away goals rule (which had already been used in the Cup Winners' Cup and the Fairs' Cup) was introduced if aggregate scores were level after two legs, but only for the first round of the competition. Extra time goals were not included in the rule.

Celtic were the defending champions, but were eliminated by Dynamo Kyiv in the first round.

== Teams ==
(Albania) Dinamo Tirana (1st)	(Austria) Rapid Wien (1st)	(Belgium) Anderlecht (1st)	(Bulgaria) Botev Plovdiv (1st)
(Cyprus) Olympiakos Nicosia (1st)	(Czechoslovakia) Sparta Prague (1st)	(Denmark) Hvidovre (1st)	(England) Manchester United (1st)
(Finland) KuPS (1st)	(France) Saint-Étienne (1st)	(East Germany) FC Karl-Marx-Stadt (1st)	(West Germany) Eintracht Braunschweig (1st)
(Greece) Olympiacos (1st)	(Hungary) Vasas (1st)	(Iceland) Valur (1st)	(Republic of Ireland) Dundalk (1st)
(Italy) Juventus (1st)	(Luxembourg) Jeunesse Esch (1st)	(Malta) Hibernians (1st)	(Netherlands) Ajax (1st)
(Northern Ireland) Glentoran (1st)	(Norway) Skeid (1st)	(Poland) Górnik Zabrze (1st)	(Portugal) Benfica (1st)
(Romania) Rapid București (1st)	(Scotland) Celtic (1st)^{TH}	(Spain) Real Madrid (1st)	(Sweden) Djurgården (1st)
(Switzerland) Basel (1st)	(Turkey) Beşiktaş (1st)	(Soviet Union) Dynamo Kyiv (1st)	(Socialist Federal Republic of Yugoslavia) Sarajevo (1st)

== Bracket ==
First round
(Republic of Ireland) Dundalk	0	1	1
(Hungary) Vasas	1	8	9
(Iceland) Valur (a)	1	3	4
(Luxembourg) Jeunesse Esch	1	3	4
(Northern Ireland) Glentoran	1	0	1
(Portugal) Benfica (a)	1	0	1
(France) Saint-Étienne	2	3	5
(Finland) KuPS	0	0	0
(Turkey) Beşiktaş	0	0	0
(Austria) Rapid Wien	1	3	4
(West Germany) Eintracht Braunschweig	w
(Albania) Dinamo Tirana	o
(Greece) Olympiacos	0	0	0
(Italy) Juventus	0	2	2
(Bulgaria) Botev Plovdiv	2	0	2
(Romania) Rapid București (a.e.t.)	0	3	3
(Cyprus) Olympiakos Nicosia	2	1	3
(Socialist Federal Republic of Yugoslavia) Sarajevo	2	3	5
(England) Manchester United	4	0	4
(Malta) Hibernians	0	0	0
(Scotland) Celtic	1	1	2
(Soviet Union) Dynamo Kyiv	2	1	3
(Poland) Górnik Zabrze	3	1	4
(Sweden) Djurgården	0	0	0
(Switzerland) Basel	1	3	4
(Denmark) Hvidovre	2	3	5
(Netherlands) Ajax	1	1	2
(Spain) Real Madrid (a.e.t.)	1	2	3
(Norway) Skeid	0	1	1
(Czechoslovakia) Sparta Prague	1	1	2
(East Germany) FC Karl-Marx-Stadt	1	1	2
(Belgium) Anderlecht	3	2	5

Second round
(Hungary) Vasas	6	5	11
(Iceland) Valur	0	1	1
(Portugal) Benfica	2	0	2
(France) Saint-Étienne	0	1	1
(Austria) Rapid Wien	1	0	1
(West Germany) Eintracht Braunschweig	0	2	2
(Italy) Juventus	1	0	1
(Romania) Rapid București	0	0	0
(Socialist Federal Republic of Yugoslavia) Sarajevo	0	1	1
(England) Manchester United	0	2	2
(Soviet Union) Dynamo Kyiv	1	1	2
(Poland) Górnik Zabrze	1	2	3
(Denmark) Hvidovre	2	1	3
(Spain) Real Madrid	2	4	6
(Czechoslovakia) Sparta Prague	3	3	6
(Belgium) Anderlecht	2	3	5

Quarter-finals
(Hungary) Vasas	0	0	0
(Portugal) Benfica	0	3	3
(West Germany) Eintracht Braunschweig	3	0	3 (0)
(Italy) Juventus	2	1	3 (1)
(England) Manchester United	2	0	2
(Poland) Górnik Zabrze	0	1	1
(Spain) Real Madrid	3	1	4
(Czechoslovakia) Sparta Prague	0	2	2

Semi-finals
(Portugal) Benfica	2	1	3
(Italy) Juventus	0	0	0
(England) Manchester United	1	3	4
(Spain) Real Madrid	0	3	3

Final
(Portugal) Benfica	1
(England) Manchester United (a.e.t.)	4

== First round ==
Team 1	Agg.	Team 2	1st leg	2nd leg
Olympiakos Nicosia (Cyprus)	3–5	(Socialist Federal Republic of Yugoslavia) Sarajevo	2–2	1–3
Manchester United (England)	4–0	(Malta) Hibernians	4–0	0–0
Celtic (Scotland)	2–3	(Soviet Union) Dynamo Kyiv	1–2	1–1
Górnik Zabrze (Poland)	4–0	(Sweden) Djurgården	3–0	1–0
Basel (Switzerland)	4–5	(Denmark) Hvidovre	1–2	3–3
Ajax (Netherlands)	2–3	(Spain) Real Madrid	1–1	1–2 (a.e.t.)
Skeid (Norway)	1–2	(Czechoslovakia) Sparta Prague	0–1	1–1
FC Karl-Marx-Stadt (East Germany)	2–5	(Belgium) Anderlecht	1–3	1–2
Dundalk (Republic of Ireland)	1–9	(Hungary) Vasas	0–1	1–8
Valur (Iceland)	4–4 (a)	(Luxembourg) Jeunesse Esch	1–1	3–3
Glentoran (Northern Ireland)	1–1 (a)	(Portugal) Benfica	1–1	0–0
Saint-Étienne (France)	5–0	(Finland) KuPS	2–0	3–0
Beşiktaş (Turkey)	0–4	(Austria) Rapid Wien	0–1	0–3
Eintracht Braunschweig (West Germany)	(w/o)	(Albania) Dinamo Tirana	–	–
Olympiacos (Greece)	0–2	(Italy) Juventus	0–0	0–2
Botev Plovdiv (Bulgaria)	2–3	(Romania) Rapid București	2–0	0–3 (a.e.t.)

=== First leg ===
20 September 1967

Olympiakos Nicosia (Cyprus)	2–2	(Socialist Federal Republic of Yugoslavia) Sarajevo
Kettenis 1'; Tešan 43' (o.g.)	Report	Antić 50', 58'

GSP Stadium, Nicosia
Attendance: 4,000
Referee: Aurelio Angonese (Italy)

20 September 1967

Manchester United (England)	4–0	(Malta) Hibernians
Sadler 12', 58'; Law 43', 62'	Report

Old Trafford, Manchester
Attendance: 43,912
Referee: Pereira da Costa (Portugal)

20 September 1967
20:00

Celtic (Scotland)	1–2	(Soviet Union) Dynamo Kyiv
Lennox 62'	Report	Puzach 4'; Byshovets 29'

Celtic Park, Glasgow
Attendance: 52,223
Referee: Kurt Waldemar Tschenscher (West Germany)

20 September 1967

Górnik Zabrze (Poland)	3–0	(Sweden) Djurgården
Lubański 41', 86'; Lentner 88'	Report

Silesian Stadium, Chorzów
Attendance: 35,665
Referee: Rudolf Glöckner (East Germany)

20 September 1967

Basel (Switzerland)	1–2	(Denmark) Hvidovre
Hauser 17'	Report	Larsen 58'; Sørensen 80'

St. Jakob Stadium, Basel
Attendance: 13,344
Referee: Gyula Emsberger (Hungary)

20 September 1967

Ajax (Netherlands)	1–1	(Spain) Real Madrid
Cruyff 17'	Report	Pirri 35'

Olympisch Stadion, Amsterdam
Attendance: 55,940
Referee: Jim Finney (England)

20 September 1967

Skeid (Norway)	0–1	(Czechoslovakia) Sparta Prague
	Report	Mráz 7'

Bislett Stadion, Oslo
Attendance: 16,123
Referee: Bertil Lööw (Sweden)

20 September 1967

Karl-Marx-Stadt (East Germany)	1–3	(Belgium) Anderlecht
Steinmann 41'	Report	Mulder 3', 35'; Van Himst 38'

Ernst-Thälmann-Stadion, Karl-Marx-Stadt
Attendance: 29,260
Referee: Kevin Howley (England)

20 September 1967

Dundalk (Republic of Ireland)	0–1	(Hungary) Vasas
	Report	Korsós 67'

Oriel Park, Dundalk
Attendance: 4,177
Referee: Laurens van Ravens (Netherlands)

17 September 1967

Valur (Iceland)	1–1	(Luxembourg) Jeunesse Esch
Gunnarsson 38'	Report	Di Genova 25'

Laugardalsvöllur, Reykjavík
Attendance: 3,125
Referee: John Russel (Northern Ireland)

13 September 1967

Glentoran (Northern Ireland)	1–1	(Portugal) Benfica
Colrain 10' (pen.)	Report	Eusébio 86'

The Oval, Belfast
Attendance: 24,750
Referee: Roger Barde (France)

20 September 1967

Saint-Étienne (France)	2–0	(Finland) KuPS
Herbin 43'; Jacquet 47'	Report

Stade Geoffroy-Guichard, Saint-Étienne
Attendance: 18,948
Referee: Leo Callaghan (Wales)

13 September 1967

Beşiktaş (Turkey)	0–1	(Austria) Rapid Wien
	Report	Flögel 22'

Mithatpaşa Stadium, Istanbul
Attendance: 31,208
Referee: Goncho Rusev (Bulgaria)

20 September 1967

Olympiacos (Greece)	0–0	(Italy) Juventus
	Report

Georgios Karaiskakis Stadium, Piraeus
Attendance: 35,702
Referee: Lajos Horvath (Hungary)

27 September 1967

Botev Plovdiv (Bulgaria)	2–0	(Romania) Rapid București
Dermendzhiev 54' (pen.); Popov 70'	Report

9th September Stadium, Plovdiv
Attendance: 11,600
Referee: Sergei Alimov (Soviet Union)

=== Second leg ===
11 October 1967

Sarajevo (Socialist Federal Republic of Yugoslavia)	3–1	(Cyprus) Olympiakos Nicosia
Antić 33'; Šiljkut 83', 84'	Report	Kettenis 79'

Koševo Stadium, Sarajevo
Attendance: 4,308
Referee: Gyula Gere (Hungary)

Sarajevo won 5–3 on aggregate.

27 September 1967

Hibernians (Malta)	0–0	(England) Manchester United
	Report

Empire Stadium, Gżira
Attendance: 23,217
Referee: Bruno de Marchi (Italy)

Manchester United won 4–0 on aggregate.

4 October 1967
19:00

Dynamo Kyiv (Soviet Union)	1–1	(Scotland) Celtic
Byshovets 89'	Report	Lennox 67'

Central Stadium, Kyiv
Attendance: 68,352
Referee: Antonio Sbardella (Italy)

Dynamo Kyiv won 3–2 on aggregate.

4 October 1967

Djurgården (Sweden)	0–1	(Poland) Górnik Zabrze
	Report	Musiałek 35'

Stockholms Olympiastadion, Stockholm
Attendance: 1,364
Referee: Tage Sørensen (Denmark)

Górnik Zabrze won 4–0 on aggregate.

18 October 1967

Hvidovre (Denmark)	3–3	(Switzerland) Basel
Hansen 18'; Sørensen 39'; Olsen 58'	Report	Hauser 2'; Benthaus 78'; Wenger 85'

Idrætsparken, Copenhagen
Attendance: 9,363
Referee: Ken Dagnall (England)

Hvidovre won 5–4 on aggregate.

11 October 1967

Real Madrid (Spain)	2–1 (a.e.t.)	(Netherlands) Ajax
Gento 58'; Veloso 99'	Report	Groot 69'

Santiago Bernabéu, Madrid
Attendance: 39,244
Referee: Bobby Davidson (Scotland)

Real Madrid won 3–2 on aggregate.

4 October 1967

Sparta Prague (Czechoslovakia)	1–1	(Norway) Skeid
Mráz 58'	Report	Sjøberg 38'

Letná Stadium, Prague
Attendance: 4,000
Referee: Franz Mayer (Austria)

Sparta Prague won 2–1 on aggregate.

18 October 1967

Anderlecht (Belgium)	2–1	(East Germany) Karl-Marx-Stadt
Bergholtz 33'; Van Himst 38'	Report	Schuster 11'

Émile Versé Stadium, Brussels
Attendance: 28,831
Referee: José María Ortiz de Mendíbil (Spain)

Anderlecht won 5–2 on aggregate.

11 October 1967

Vasas (Hungary)	8–1	(Republic of Ireland) Dundalk
Vidáts 10', 87'; Farkas 32', 35', 72'; Korsós 43', 85'; Molnár 68'	Report	Hale 25'

Népstadion, Budapest
Attendance: 74,117
Referee: Josef Krňávek (Czechoslovakia)

Vasas won 9–1 on aggregate.

1 October 1967

Jeunesse Esch (Luxembourg)	3–3	(Iceland) Valur
Hnatow 56'; Di Genova 86'; Langer 89'	Report	Jónsson 10'; Gunnarsson 36', 60'

Stade Émile Mayrisch, Esch-sur-Alzette
Attendance: 4,552
Referee: Michel Kitabdjian (France)

4–4 on aggregate; Valur won on away goals.

4 October 1967

Benfica (Portugal)	0–0	(Northern Ireland) Glentoran
	Report

Estádio da Luz, Lisbon
Attendance: 36,844
Referee: Robert Schaut (Belgium)

1–1 on aggregate; Benfica won on away goals.

4 October 1967

KuPS (Finland)	0–3	(France) Saint-Étienne
	Report	Herbin 5'; Bosquier 25'; Revelli 84' (pen.)

Väinölänniemen Stadion, Kuopio
Attendance: 5,279
Referee: Tofik Bakhramov (Soviet Union)

Saint-Étienne won 5–0 on aggregate.

19 September 1967

Rapid Wien (Austria)	3–0	(Turkey) Beşiktaş
Seitl 9'; Grausam 43'; Flögel 75'	Report

Praterstadion, Vienna
Attendance: 27,783
Referee: Joseph Heymann (Switzerland)

Rapid Wien won 4–0 on aggregate.

11 October 1967

Juventus (Italy)	2–0	(Greece) Olympiacos
Zigoni 12'; Menichelli 49'	Report

Stadio Comunale, Turin
Attendance: 31,878
Referee: Gilbert Droz (Switzerland)

Juventus won 2–0 on aggregate.

18 October 1967

Rapid București (Romania)	3–0 (a.e.t.)	(Bulgaria) Botev Plovdiv
Codreanu 25', 70'; Ionescu 108'	Report

Stadionul 23 August, Bucharest
Attendance: 20,179
Referee: Marian Srodecki (Poland)

Rapid București won 3–2 on aggregate.

== Second round ==
Team 1	Agg.	Team 2	1st leg	2nd leg
Sarajevo (Socialist Federal Republic of Yugoslavia)	1–2	(England) Manchester United	0–0	1–2
Dynamo Kyiv (Soviet Union)	2–3	(Poland) Górnik Zabrze	1–2	1–1
Hvidovre (Denmark)	3–6	(Spain) Real Madrid	2–2	1–4
Sparta Prague (Czechoslovakia)	6–5	(Belgium) Anderlecht	3–2	3–3
Vasas (Hungary)	11–1	(Iceland) Valur	6–0	5–1
Benfica (Portugal)	2–1	(France) Saint-Étienne	2–0	0–1
Rapid Wien (Austria)	1–2	(West Germany) Eintracht Braunschweig	1–0	0–2
Juventus (Italy)	1–0	(Romania) Rapid București	1–0	0–0

=== First leg ===
15 November 1967

Sarajevo (Socialist Federal Republic of Yugoslavia)	0–0	(England) Manchester United
	Report

Koševo Stadium, Sarajevo
Attendance: 37,222
Referee: Francesco Francescon (Italy)

17 November 1967
19:00

Dynamo Kyiv (Soviet Union)	1–2	(Poland) Górnik Zabrze
Olek 12' (o.g.)	Report	Szołtysik 15'; Lubański 61'

Central Stadium, Kyiv
Attendance: 57,038
Referee: Vasile Dumitrescu (Romania)

15 November 1967

Hvidovre (Denmark)	2–2	(Spain) Real Madrid
Hansen 25'; Petersen 71'	Report	Gento 35'; Pirri 47'

Idrætsparken, Copenhagen
Attendance: 40,663
Referee: Rudolf Glöckner (East Germany)

29 November 1967

Sparta Prague (Czechoslovakia)	3–2	(Belgium) Anderlecht
Mašek 25', 32' (pen.), 62'	Report	Jurion 35'; Van Himst 55'

Stadion Dr. Václava Vacka, Prague
Attendance: 10,071
Referee: Joseph Heymann (Switzerland)

15 November 1967

Vasas (Hungary)	6–0	(Iceland) Valur
Bergsson 5' (o.g.); Pál 14'; Radics 37', 44', 50'; Puskás 47'	Report

Népstadion, Budapest
Attendance: 27,797
Referee: Pavel Špoták (Czechoslovakia)

16 November 1967

Benfica (Portugal)	2–0	(France) Saint-Étienne
José Augusto 28'; Eusébio 59' (pen.)	Report

Estádio da Luz, Lisbon
Attendance: 22,804
Referee: John Adair (Northern Ireland)

15 November 1967

Rapid Wien (Austria)	1–0	(West Germany) Eintracht Braunschweig
Hasil 54'	Report

Praterstadion, Vienna
Attendance: 51,181
Referee: Tofik Bakhramov (Soviet Union)

29 November 1967

Juventus (Italy)	1–0	(Romania) Rapid București
Magnusson 57'	Report

Stadio Comunale, Turin
Attendance: 19,452
Referee: Gyula Emsberger (Hungary)

=== Second leg ===
29 November 1967

Manchester United (England)	2–1	(Socialist Federal Republic of Yugoslavia) Sarajevo
Aston 10'; Best 63'	Report	Delalić 87'

Old Trafford, Manchester
Attendance: 62,801
Referee: Roger Mâchin (France)

Manchester United won 2–1 on aggregate.

29 November 1967
17:30

Górnik Zabrze (Poland)	1–1	(Soviet Union) Dynamo Kyiv
Szołtysik 43'	Report	Turyanchik 37'

Silesian Stadium, Chorzów
Attendance: 71,145
Referee: Johan Einar Boström (Sweden)

Górnik Zabrze won 3–2 on aggregate.

29 November 1967

Real Madrid (Spain)	4–1	(Denmark) Hvidovre
Velázquez 16'; Grosso 19', 30'; Gento 75'	Report	Petersen 28'

Santiago Bernabéu, Madrid
Attendance: 26,263
Referee: Vital Loraux (Belgium)

Real Madrid won 6–3 on aggregate.

6 December 1967

Anderlecht (Belgium)	3–3	(Czechoslovakia) Sparta Prague
Van Himst 60', 65'; Devrindt 83'	Report	Mašek 30', 85'; Mráz 89'

Émile Versé Stadium, Brussels
Attendance: 31,466
Referee: Paul Schiller (Austria)

Sparta Prague won 6–5 on aggregate.

17 November 1967

Valur (Iceland)	1–5	(Hungary) Vasas
Gunnarsson 85'	Report	Molnár 11'; Pál 13'; Mathesz 30'; Váradi 53'; Kovács 72'

Városi Stadium, Várpalota
Attendance: 2,773
Referee: Iván Pláček (Czechoslovakia)

Vasas won 11–1 on aggregate.

30 November 1967

Saint-Étienne (France)	1–0	(Portugal) Benfica
Bereta 10'	Report

Stade Geoffroy-Guichard, Saint-Étienne
Attendance: 24,480
Referee: Marian Środecki (Poland)

Benfica won 2–1 on aggregate.

29 November 1967

Eintracht Braunschweig (West Germany)	2–0	(Austria) Rapid Wien
Grzyb 38'; Saborowski 43'	Report

Eintracht-Stadion, Braunschweig
Attendance: 30,507
Referee: Thomas Wharton (Scotland)

Eintracht Braunschweig won 2–1 on aggregate.

13 December 1967

Rapid București (Romania)	0–0	(Italy) Juventus
	Report

Stadionul 23 August, Bucharest
Attendance: 5,510
Referee: Karl Riegg (West Germany)

Juventus won 1–0 on aggregate.

== Quarter-finals ==
Team 1	Agg.	Team 2	1st leg	2nd leg	Play-off
Manchester United (England)	2–1	(Poland) Górnik Zabrze	2–0	0–1	
Real Madrid (Spain)	4–2	(Czechoslovakia) Sparta Prague	3–0	1–2	
Vasas (Hungary)	0–3	(Portugal) Benfica	0–0	0–3	
Eintracht Braunschweig (West Germany)	3–3	(Italy) Juventus	3–2	0–1	0–1

=== First leg ===
28 February 1968

Manchester United (England)	2–0	(Poland) Górnik Zabrze
Florenski 60' (o.g.); Kidd 90'	Report

Old Trafford, Manchester
Attendance: 63,456
Referee: José María Ortiz de Mendibil (Spain)

6 March 1968

Real Madrid (Spain)	3–0	(Czechoslovakia) Sparta Prague
Amancio 61', 62', 68'	Report

Santiago Bernabéu, Madrid
Attendance: 35,250
Referee: Jim Finney (England)

6 March 1968

Vasas (Hungary)	0–0	(Portugal) Benfica
	Report

Népstadion, Budapest
Attendance: 36,394
Referee: Kurt Waldemar Tschenscher (West Germany)

31 January 1968

Eintracht Braunschweig (West Germany)	3–2	(Italy) Juventus
Kaack 28'; Dulz 37'; Berg 38'	Report	Kaack 10' (o.g.); Sacco 81'

Eintracht-Stadion, Braunschweig
Attendance: 29,963
Referee: Gilbert Droz (Switzerland)

=== Second leg ===
13 March 1968

Górnik Zabrze (Poland)	1–0	(England) Manchester United
Lubański 70'	Report

Silesian Stadium, Chorzów
Attendance: 77,649
Referee: Concetto Lo Bello (Italy)

Manchester United won 2–1 on aggregate.

20 March 1968

Sparta Prague (Czechoslovakia)	2–1	(Spain) Real Madrid
Kvašňák 36'; Dyba 45'	Report	Gento 57'

Stadion Dr. Václava Vacka, Prague
Attendance: 40,431
Referee: Hans Rademacher (West Germany)

Real Madrid won 4–2 on aggregate.

14 March 1968

Benfica (Portugal)	3–0	(Hungary) Vasas
Eusébio 48', 70'; Torres 77'	Report

Estádio da Luz, Lisbon
Attendance: 49,336
Referee: Laurens van Ravens (Netherlands)

Benfica won 3–0 on aggregate.

28 February 1968

Juventus (Italy)	1–0	(West Germany) Eintracht Braunschweig
Bercellino 88' (pen.)	Report

Stadio Comunale, Turin
Attendance: 37,918
Referee: Paul Schiller (Austria)

Juventus 3–3 Eintracht Braunschweig on aggregate.

=== Play-off ===
20 March 1968

Juventus (Italy)	1–0	(West Germany) Eintracht Braunschweig
Magnusson 56'	Report

Wankdorf Stadium, Bern
Attendance: 44,701
Referee: Gottfried Dienst (Switzerland)

== Semi-finals ==
Team 1	Agg.	Team 2	1st leg	2nd leg
Manchester United (England)	4–3	(Spain) Real Madrid	1–0	3–3
Benfica (Portugal)	3–0	(Italy) Juventus	2–0	1–0

=== First leg ===
24 April 1968

Manchester United (England)	1–0	(Spain) Real Madrid
Best 36'	Report

Old Trafford, Manchester
Attendance: 62,562
Referee: Tofik Bakhramov (Soviet Union)

9 May 1968

Benfica (Portugal)	2–0	(Italy) Juventus
Torres 64'; Eusébio 70'	Report

Estádio da Luz, Lisbon
Attendance: 69,375
Referee: Roger Barde (France)

=== Second leg ===
15 May 1968

Real Madrid (Spain)	3–3	(England) Manchester United
Pirri 32'; Gento 41'; Amancio 45'	Report	Zoco 44' (o.g.); Sadler 73'; Foulkes 78'

Santiago Bernabéu, Madrid
Attendance: 77,299
Referee: Antonio Sbardella (Italy)

Manchester United won 4–3 on aggregate.

15 May 1968

Juventus (Italy)	0–1	(Portugal) Benfica
	Report	Eusébio 66'

Stadio Comunale, Turin
Attendance: 62,570
Referee: Rudolf Glöckner (East Germany)

Benfica won 3–0 on aggregate.

== Final ==
29 May 1968

Benfica (Portugal)	1–4 (a.e.t.)	(England) Manchester United
Graça 79'	Report	Charlton 53', 99'; Best 92'; Kidd 94'

Wembley Stadium, London
Attendance: 92,225
Referee: Concetto Lo Bello (Italy)

== Top scorers ==
Rank	Name	Team	Goals
1	(Portugal) Eusébio	(Portugal) Benfica	6
2	(Spain) Francisco Gento	(Spain) Real Madrid	5
2	(Czechoslovakia) Václav Mašek	(Czechoslovakia) Sparta Prague	5
2	(Belgium) Paul Van Himst	(Belgium) Anderlecht	5
5	(Spain) Amancio	(Spain) Real Madrid	4
5	(Iceland) Hermann Gunnarsson	(Iceland) Valur	4
5	(Poland) Włodzimierz Lubański	(Poland) Górnik Zabrze	4
8	(Socialist Federal Republic of Yugoslavia) Boško Antić	(Socialist Federal Republic of Yugoslavia) Sarajevo	3
8	(Northern Ireland) George Best	(England) Manchester United	3
8	(Hungary) János Farkas	(Hungary) Vasas	3
8	(Hungary) István Korsós	(Hungary) Vasas	3
8	(Czechoslovakia) Ivan Mráz	(Czechoslovakia) Sparta Prague	3
8	(Spain) Pirri	(Spain) Real Madrid	3
8	(Hungary) János Radics	(Hungary) Vasas	3
8	(England) David Sadler	(England) Manchester United	3
