= Ottó Váradi =

Hungarian footballer (1948–2000)

- Váradi (in red) in 1979

Personal information
- Full name: Ottó Váradi
- Date of birth: March 31, 1948
- Place of birth: Salgótarján, Nógrád, Hungary
- Date of death: June 20, 2000 (aged 52)
- Place of death: Miskolc, Borsod–Abaúj–Zemplén, Hungary
- Position: Defender

Senior career*
Years	Team	Apps	(Gls)
1966–1972	Vasas	36	(0)
1972–1980	Diósgyőri	176	(15)
1980–1981	VSSC Nyíregyháza	2	(0)

International career
1969	Hungary U21	1	(0)

Managerial career
- 1985–1995: Diósgyőri (youth coach)
- 1996: Hámor
- * Club domestic league appearances and goals

Ottó Váradi (March 31, 1948 – June 20, 2000) was a Hungarian footballer and manager. He played as a defender who was primarily associated with playing for Diósgyőri. He would be captain of the winning squad of the 1976–77 Magyar Kupa as well as reaching third place in the 1978–79 Nemzeti Bajnokság I.

== Club career ==
Váradi would begin his footballing career when he was only 17 years old for Vasas. He would play alongside players such as Kálmán Mészöly, János Farkas, Lajos Lakinger and Kálmán Ihász. His first major tournament would be in the 1968–69 Mitropa Cup, beating Crvena Zvezda in an away match on March 26, 1969 with Váradi himself scoring the second goal of the match. The club was then invited to play in the 1970 Trofeo Costa del Sol where they would become champions of the tournament, beating out Málaga. That same year, they would also be champions of the 1969–70 Mitropa Cup. Following a visit to Peru, his final season would be in 1972 as he would be scouted to play for Diósgyőri beginning in the 1972–73 Nemzeti Bajnokság I. He would oversee the club nearly experience relegation in the 1974–75 Nemzeti Bajnokság I where thanks to the defense of Váradi, would have the club continue playing in the top division of Hungarian football. By 1977, he was made captain of the club and would reach the final of the 1976–77 Magyar Kupa where Diósgyőri would prevail amongst the previous champions and win the tournament which would vastly increase morale for the club. This would result in the club qualifying for the 1977–78 European Cup Winners' Cup where the club would beat Beşiktaş in the first round but be knocked out by Hajduk Split in the second round.

After a solid performance in the 1977–78 Nemzeti Bajnokság I, the club would go on to reach third place in the 1978–79 Nemzeti Bajnokság I as the club would win 15 out of 17 home games. They would qualify for the 1979–80 UEFA Cup, knocking out Rapid Wien in the process. They would then face off against Dundee United where after the Scottish club's initial underestimation of Diósgyőri, would get eliminated in a 4–1 defeat. Despite great confidence for the team in the third round against West German club Kaiserslautern, would be demolished in an 8–1 defeat and the Hungarian club being eliminated from the tournament. Throughout his career with Diósgyőri, he would score 15 goals in 176 matches. This would be Váradi's final season with the club as he would then play for VSSC Nyíregyháza for the 1980–81 Nemzeti Bajnokság I. He would spend a majority of his time with the club on a tour in two friendlies in Mozambique, playing against local club Costa do Sol in a 2–1 loss as well as against Soviet club SKA-Khabarovsk in a 1–0 with a header by Váradi himself.

== International career ==
He would briefly represent Hungary U21 in a friendly against Italy U21 on May 7, 1969.

== Managerial career ==
In 1985, Béla Gál and Zoltán Hódi would request Váradi to return as a player-coach for the secondary youth sector of Diósgyőri with Karcsi Földesi. Following the primary sector's manager, Jóska Csányi contracting an illness, Váradi would manage the primary sector for six months. Satisfied with his service, György Száger would entrust him with a permanent position in 1987. He would continue youth training for various seasons until leaving in 1995. He would also be the founding manager of Hámor in 1996.

== Personal life ==
Ottó was born on March 31, 1948, at Salgótarján and has a brother, István. He later had a daughter named Zsanett. He died on June 20, 2000 at the age of 52. In 2022, a football tournament in Felsőhámor was held in his honor.
