= Komiti (supporters' group) =

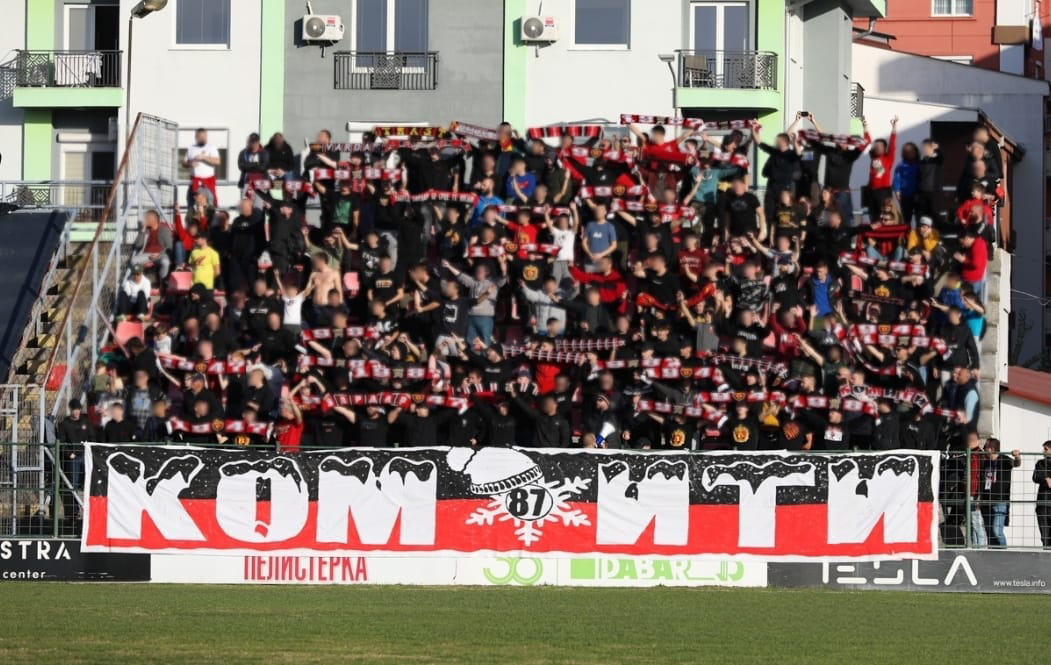
- Nickname: Komiti Skopje; Komiti Zapad
- Established: 1987
- Type: Supporters' group Ultras group
- Clubs: FK Vardar; RK Vardar
- Location: Skopje, North Macedonia
- Arena: Boris Trajkovski Stadium; Jane Sandanski Arena
- Colors: Red, black

Komiti (Macedonian: Комити) are a supporters' group and ultras group that follows the Macedonian sports clubs that compete under the Vardar banner, mainly FK Vardar in football and RK Vardar in handball.

== History ==
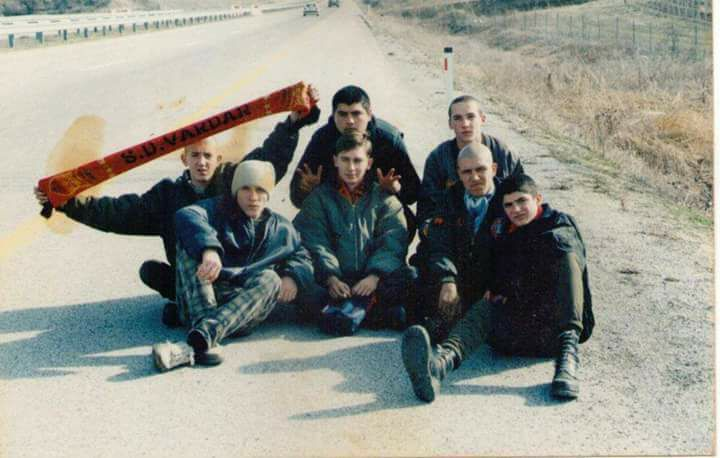
Komiti Skopje Skinheads with a scarf of Vardar Skopje in the 90s

Komiti was established in 1987 in Yugoslav Macedonia (current North Macedonia), as a football fan association by young Macedonians. The name derives from the name of the members of the anti-Ottoman chetas called Komitadjis. Per Komiti's written code of conduct, it accepts people from across the political spectrum and forbids talking to journalists. Apart from supporting FK Vardar, it has supported RK Vardar.

Komiti was the basis of the youth wing of the political party VMRO-DPMNE during the 1990s. Komiti members, while watching their team, Vardar Skopje, had often displayed banners in support of convicted war criminal Johan Tarčulovski, who was a leader of the ultras. In 2011, Komiti (mobilized through social media) and ethnic Macedonians had a clash with ethnic Albanian supporters' group Shvercerat (Sverceri, Smugglers) and ethnic Albanians at the Skopje Fortress over the construction of a church-like building by the VMRO-DPMNE government.

In May 2014, part of the members of the Komiti violently entered the stadium in Štip without any tickets during the football match between Bregalnica and Vardar, injuring a police officer and a fan. In July 2018, it honored their murdered member, Nikola Sazdovski-Sazdo, during a football match between Vardar and Pjunik. Per the investigative journalist organization Organized Crime and Corruption Reporting Project, Komiti was among the groups funded by Russian-Greek businessman Ivan Savvidis to organize protests against the Prespa agreement. In 2018, Komiti participated in protests against the Macedonian name change. Komiti donated personal protective equipment and medical supplies to a health clinic in Skopje in 2020 during the COVID-19 pandemic in North Macedonia. In June 2022, the international non-governmental organization Global Initiative Against Transnational Organized Crime linked Komiti with the sale of drugs and weapon smuggling to fund their activities. In December 2025, members of Komiti were arrested in Bitola after attacking police officers, having a fight with the supporters' group from Bitola, Čkembari, beforehand. In a humanitarian action in February 2026, it gave 23,000 denars to an auction for the jersey of football player Stojanče Velinov, for funds to build a memorial for the victims of the 2025 Kočani nightclub fire.
