= Viden Apostolov =

Bulgarian footballer (1941–2020)

Vidеn Apostolov
Personal information
- Date of birth: 17 October 1941
- Place of birth: Novi Iskar, Bulgaria
- Date of death: 13 November 2020 (aged 79)
- Place of death: Plovdiv, Bulgaria
- Position: Defender

Senior career*
Years	Team	Apps	(Gls)
1958–1960	Lokomotiv Sofia	15	(1)
1960–1976	Botev Plovdiv	429	(37)
Total		444	(38)

International career
1962–1974	Bulgaria	22	(3)
- * Club domestic league appearances and goals

Viden Apostolov (Bulgarian: Bиден Апостолов; 17 October 1941 – 13 November 2020) was a Bulgarian football defender who played for Bulgaria in the 1966 FIFA World Cup. He also played for PFC Botev Plovdiv.

== Honours ==
Botev Plovdiv

- Bulgarian League: 1966–67
- Bulgarian Cup: 1961–62
- Balkans Cup: 1972
