= Gogo Jovčev =

Macedonian footballer

Personal information
- Full name: Gogo Jovčev; Гого Јовчев
- Date of birth: 25 March 1974 (age 52)
- Place of birth: Skopje, SR Macedonia
- Position: Goalkeeper

Youth career
- FK Vardar

Senior career*
Years	Team	Apps	(Gls)
1991–1996	Vardar		(0)
1991	→ FK Skopje (loan)	15	(0)
1995–1996	→ Bregalnica Štip (loan)	19	(0)
1996–1997	FK Skopje	20	(0)
1997	Pobeda	4	(0)
1997–1999	Sloga Jugomagnat	1	(0)
1999–2001	→ Rabotnički (loan)	37	(0)
2001–2002	Sloga Jugomagnat	30	(0)
2002–2003	Vardar	22	(0)
2004	Belasica	8	(0)
2004–2005	Shkëndija	25	(0)
2005–2006	Cementarnica	13	(0)
2006–2007	Bregalnica Štip	3	(0)
2009	Gorno Lisiče	5	(0)

International career^{‡}
1998–2005	Macedonia	9	(0)

Managerial career
- 2009–2012: Macedonia (Goalkeeper Coach)
- 2015–: North Macedonia (Goalkeeper Coach)
- * Club domestic league appearances and goals as of 31 August 2009 ‡ National team caps and goals as of 31 August 2009

Gogo Jovčev (Macedonian: Гого Јовчев; born 25 March 1974) is a retired Macedonian football goalkeeper, and a current coach.

== Playing career ==
=== International ===
He made his senior debut for Macedonia in a May 1998 friendly match away against Canada and has earned a total of 9 caps, scoring no goals. His final international was a September 2005 FIFA World Cup qualification match against Finland.

== Coaching career ==
He is currently the goalkeeper coach on the North Macedonia national football team.
