= Peter Kaack =

German footballer (1941–2025)

Personal information
- Date of birth: 28 April 1941
- Place of birth: Kleinkummerfeld, Germany
- Date of death: 31 July 2025 (aged 84)
- Height: 1.79 m (5 ft 10 in)
- Position: Defender

Youth career
- –1961: Gut Heil Neumünster

Senior career*
Years	Team	Apps	(Gls)
1961–1963	VfR Neumünster	48	(1)
1963–1973	Eintracht Braunschweig	299	(2)
1973–1979	VfR Neumünster		

International career
1963–1964	West Germany U-23	4	(0)
- * Club domestic league appearances and goals

Peter Kaack (28 April 1941 – 31 July 2025) was a German footballer who played as a defender. He spent ten seasons in the Bundesliga with Eintracht Braunschweig, winning the 1966–67 Bundesliga. Kaack died on 31 July 2025, at the age of 84.

== Honours ==
Eintracht Braunschweig

- Bundesliga: 1966–67
