= 1972 Balkans Cup =

Tournament details
- Country: Balkans
- Teams: 6

Final positions
- Champions: (Bulgaria) Trakia Plovdiv
- Runners-up: (Socialist Federal Republic of Yugoslavia) FK Vardar

Tournament statistics
- Matches played: 14
- Goals scored: 41 (2.93 per match)

The 1972 Balkans Cup was an edition of the Balkans Cup, a regional football competition featuring representative clubs from the Balkan states. The tournament was contested by six teams and Trakia Plovdiv emerged as the champion, winning the trophy.

== Group Stage ==
=== Group A ===
Pos	Team	Pld	W	D	L	GF	GA	GR	Pts	Qualification
1	(Socialist Federal Republic of Yugoslavia) FK Vardar (A)	4	1	2	1	6	4	1.500	4	Advances to finals
2	(Greece) Kavala	4	2	0	2	5	6	0.833	4	
3	(Albania) Shkëndija Tiranë	4	1	2	1	4	5	0.800	4	

Source: rsssf.com
Rules for classification: 1) points; 2) goal average; 3) number of goals scored
(A) Advance to a further round
2 May 1972

Shkëndija Tiranë (Albania)	2–1	(Greece) Kavala

Dinamo, Tirana

16 May 1972

Kavala (Greece)	2–0	(Albania) Shkëndija Tiranë

Anthi Karagianni, Kavala

18 June 1972

Kavala (Greece)	1–0	(Socialist Federal Republic of Yugoslavia) FK Vardar

Anthi Karagianni, Kavala

25 June 1972

FK Vardar (Socialist Federal Republic of Yugoslavia)	4–1	(Greece) Kavala

Gradski, Skopje

17 September 1972

FK Vardar (Socialist Federal Republic of Yugoslavia)	1–1	(Albania) Shkëndija Tiranë

Gradski, Skopje

24 September 1972

Shkëndija Tiranë (Albania)	1–1	(Socialist Federal Republic of Yugoslavia) FK Vardar

Dinamo, Tirana

=== Group B ===
Pos	Team	Pld	W	D	L	GF	GA	GR	Pts	Qualification
1	(Bulgaria) Trakia Plovdiv (A)	4	2	2	0	7	3	2.333	6	Advances to finals
2	(Turkey) Göztepe	4	2	1	1	6	4	1.500	5	
3	(Romania) Steagul Roșu Brașov	4	0	1	3	4	10	0.400	1	

Source: rsssf.com
Rules for classification: 1) points; 2) goal average; 3) number of goals scored
(A) Advance to a further round
29 March 1972

Trakia Plovdiv (Bulgaria)	1–1	(Romania) Steagul Roșu Brașov

Trakia, Plovdiv

26 April 1972

Steagul Roșu Brașov (Romania)	2–3	(Bulgaria) Trakia Plovdiv

Tineretului, Brașov

14 June 1972

Steagul Roșu Brașov (Romania)	0–1	(Turkey) Göztepe
		Türkkan 65'

Tineretului, Brașov

23 August 1972

Göztepe (Turkey)	0–0	(Bulgaria) Trakia Plovdiv

İzmir Alsancak, İzmir

30 August 1972

Göztepe (Turkey)	5–1	(Romania) Steagul Roșu Brașov
Öznur 4', 86'; Aydın 18'; Okçuoğlu 38'; Türkkan 44'		Pescaru 55' (pen.)

İzmir Alsancak, İzmir

6 September 1972

Trakia Plovdiv (Bulgaria)	3–0	(Turkey) Göztepe
Dermendzhiev 66', 88'; Ubinov 83'

Trakia, Plovdiv

== Finals ==
Team 1	Agg.	Team 2	1st leg	2nd leg
Trakia Plovdiv (Bulgaria)	5–4	(Socialist Federal Republic of Yugoslavia) FK Vardar	5–0	0–4

=== First leg ===
27 September 1972

Trakia Plovdiv (Bulgaria)	5–0	(Socialist Federal Republic of Yugoslavia) FK Vardar
Apostolov 8'; Kichekov 56', 74', 80', 86'

Trakia, Plovdiv
Attendance: 5,000
Referee: Nicolae Rainea (Romania)

=== Second leg ===
25 October 1972

FK Vardar (Socialist Federal Republic of Yugoslavia)	4–0	(Bulgaria) Trakia Plovdiv
Nikolovski 37'; Balevski 43'; Uzunov 58', 83'

Gradski, Skopje

Trakia Plovdiv won 5–4 on aggregate.
