= FK Vardar =

Association football club in North Macedonia

Vardar
- Full name: Fudbalski klub Vardar; Фудбалски Клуб Вардар
- Nicknames: Црвено-Црни; Crveno-Crni (The Red-Blacks)
- Short name: Vardar, VAR
- Founded: 22 July 1947; 79 years ago
- Ground: National Arena Todor Proeski
- Capacity: 33,011
- Owner(s): Atila Bijen Jalili (85%); Komiti (15%)
- Chairman: Milenko Nedelkovski
- Manager: Miodrag Božović
- League: Macedonian First League
- 2025–26: Macedonian First League, 1st (Champions)
- Website: fcvardar.com
Home colours	Away colours

FK Vardar (Macedonian: ФК Вардар) is a professional football club based in Skopje, Republic of North Macedonia, which competes in the Macedonian First League. It is the most successful football club in football in North Macedonia, that has won twelve Championship titles, six Macedonian Cups, two Macedonian Super Cups and one Yugoslav Cup. In 2017, it became the first Macedonian club to qualify for the group stage of a European competition.

== History ==
=== First Federal League ===
After World War Two, FK Vardar was established with the merger of city rivals FK Pobeda (1919) and FK Makedonija (1922), in the hall of cinema "Vardar" on 22 July 1947. The fusion assembly had decided the club's color to be blue but it was changed at the next assembly the decision to red and white.

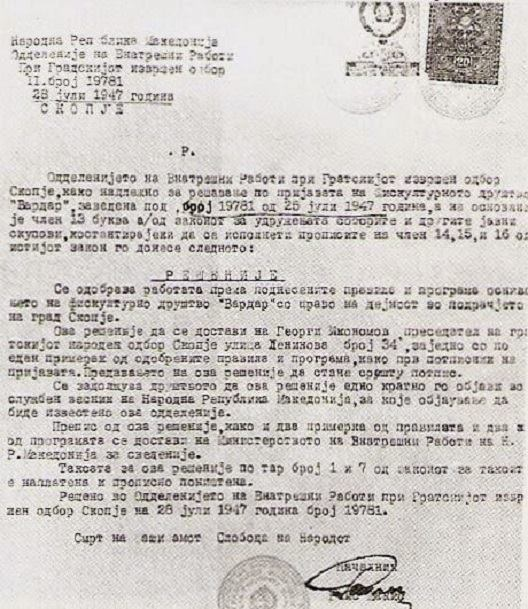
Decision of forming the football club Vardar from Skopje from 28 July 1947.

FK Pobeda competed in District League and Subdivision League until 1941 winning in 1927, 1928 and 1929 Championships. After winning the Macedonian Republic League 1947 they merged with FK Makedonija, that competed in the first season of the Federal League after the World War II, and finished at the eighth place and won the relegation playoffs against FK Sloga from Novi Sad. However, during the following decade they were relegated and promoted back several times.

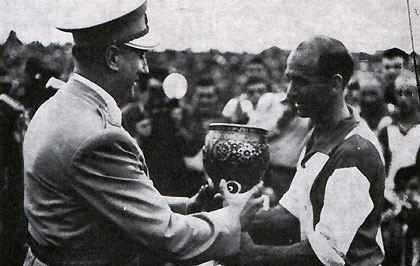
Cup Winners 1961 captain Dacevski lifting the trophy

The present recognizable red and black color jerseys were brought back again after the 1963 Skopje earthquake when the famous Milan football club sent equipment for the Skopje's team.

The club won its first major trophy in the 1960–61 Yugoslav Cup.

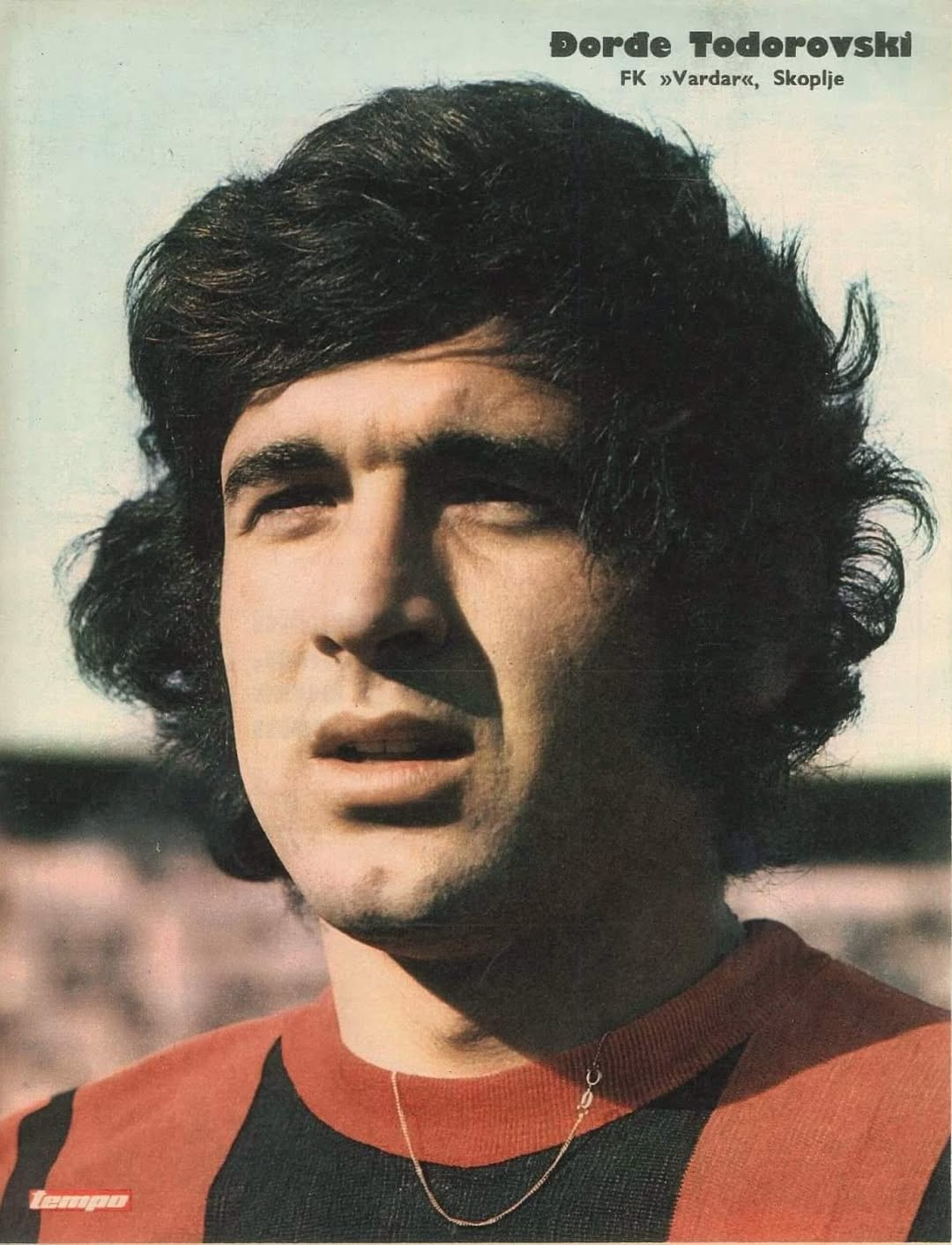
Todorovski Johnny legendary defender 300 games for Vardar

Many famous players from the region started their careers at Vardar, and their triumph in the Yugoslav Cup was a highlight. The leader of that particular generation of players was Andon Dončevski, who later coached the team from 1986 to 1988. The 1985–86 Yugoslav First League season ended notoriously due to massive irregularities during the last week of fixtures, as the Football Association of Yugoslavia headed by Slavko Šajber voided the last week's results ordering a replay of all 9 fixtures. Twelve clubs were docked 6 points due to alleged participation in a match-fixing scandal. All teams agreed to replay their games but FK Partizan, who had won the title with a 4–0 over FK Željezničar Sarajevo, refused, after which the game was awarded 3–0 to FK Željezničar Sarajevo, which gave Red Star Belgrade the title. Red Star Belgrade played in the 1986–87 European Cup. However, after a sequence of legal processes, the original final table, with FK Partizan as champions, was officially recognized in 1987. The following 1986-87 Federal League season saw 10 teams starting with -6 points. Vardar, who had not been deducted 6 points, won the title, and participated in the 1987–88 European Cup, but the points deduction was later overruled after more legal proceedings, and the title was given to FK Partizan, who headed the table without the deduction. However, Vardar was recognized as a champion by UEFA, whose team included captain Darko Pančev, Ilija Najdoski, Dragi Kanatlarovski and Vujadin Stanojković. FK Vardar went on to spend 33 seasons in the Federal top flight from 1947 to 1992 and is ranked 11th on the all-time table.

Rank	Club	G	W	D	L	GF	GA	GD	P
11	FK Vardar	1041	343	252	444	1249	1528	−279	933

In their history, FK Vardar has had many memorable matches. The first big one came in 1961 against Dunfermline from Scotland, victory at home ground 2:0 glorious moments in Cup winners Cup. Among those, the one that stands out the most was defeating FK Partizan by a score of 5–0. In early history, the 2–1 victory over Varteks in the Yugoslav Cup final is remembered by the club as its first major trophy win. A game that had the highest attendance was a matchup against Trepča where FK Vardar won 2–1 and earned promotion to the Yugoslav First League. Other matches to remember came against the great four Red Star Belgrade, Partizan Belgrade, Dinamo Zagreb and Hajduk Split. Then 1985 home ground victory over Dinamo București from Romania 1:0 in UEFA Cup competition.

=== New Age 1st league ===
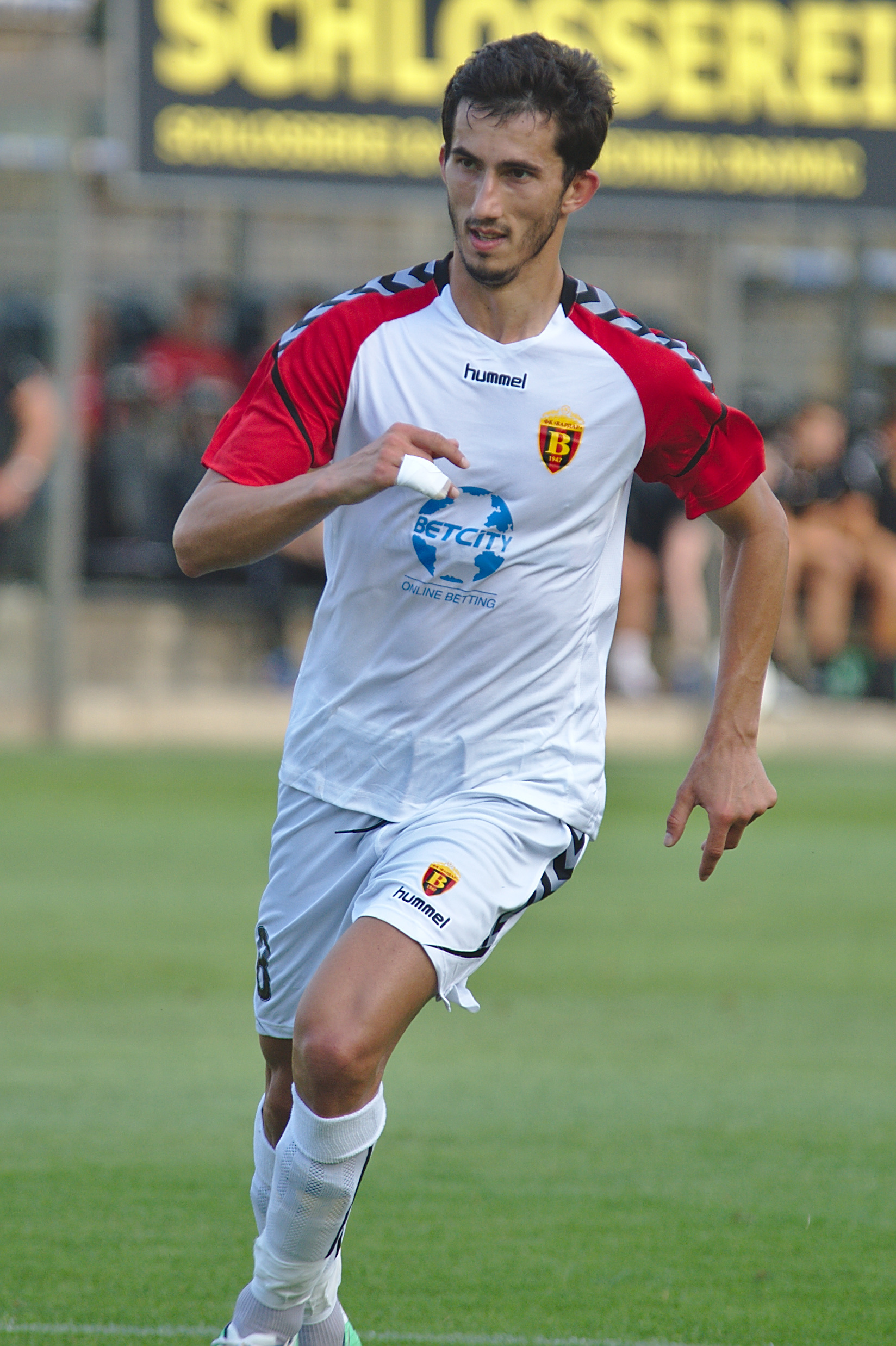
Stefan Spirovski, who played 56 matches and scored 6 goals for FK Vardar

Vardar celebrated Macedonia's independence by winning three consecutive titles including going unbeaten in the inaugural season. During the 90's they remained at the top of Macedonian football reaching five Macedonian Cup finals and winning four. After a lean spell by their standards, they brought the league again in 2001–02 and the following season just missed out on qualifying for the 2003–04 UEFA Champions League group stage. A remarkable achievement, in the Second qualifying round they eliminated CSKA Moscow and came within a goal of getting past Sparta Prague. In 2011, Vardar was originally relegated from the Macedonian First Football League, but after buying the license from Miravci it stayed. The following season they brought the league again after nine years. To date they have 17 major honors to their name. In 2012, with the new transformation, FK Vardar became the first team in Macedonia (now North Macedonia) organized as a joint stock company incorporated under the Companies Act. FK Vardar went on to spend 24 seasons in the Macedonian First Football League from 1992 to 2017 and is ranked first on the all-time table.

Rank	Club	G	W	D	L	GF	GA	GD	P
1	FK Vardar	768	439	180	149	1428	651	+777	1438

=== Memorable moments ===
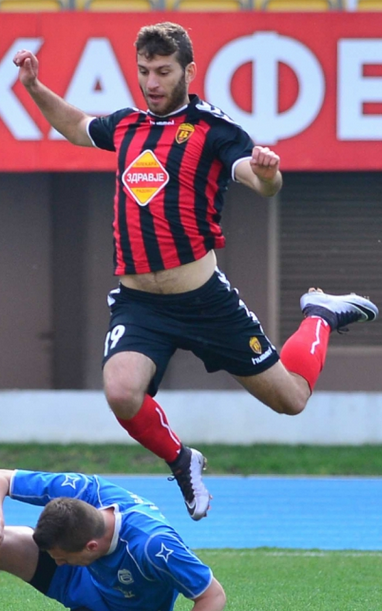
Hof Hambardjumian

At the beginning of the Macedonian First Football League the most memorable matches were all the wins against rival Pelister, including the first-ever Macedonian Football Cup final in 1993 where FK Vardar won 1–0 at the old City Stadium. The biggest international achievement of the club came in 2003 when FK Vardar came one goal short of qualifying for the UEFA Champions League group stage. They had great match against Barry Town from Wales and 3–0 victory at home ground, then another glorious 2–1 away win over Russian heavyweights CSKA Moscow. In 2004 UEFA Intertoto Cup they destroyed Ethnikos Achnas from Cyprus in both matches home and away with identical victories of 5–1, then 1–0 victory against Belgian side Gent at home ground.

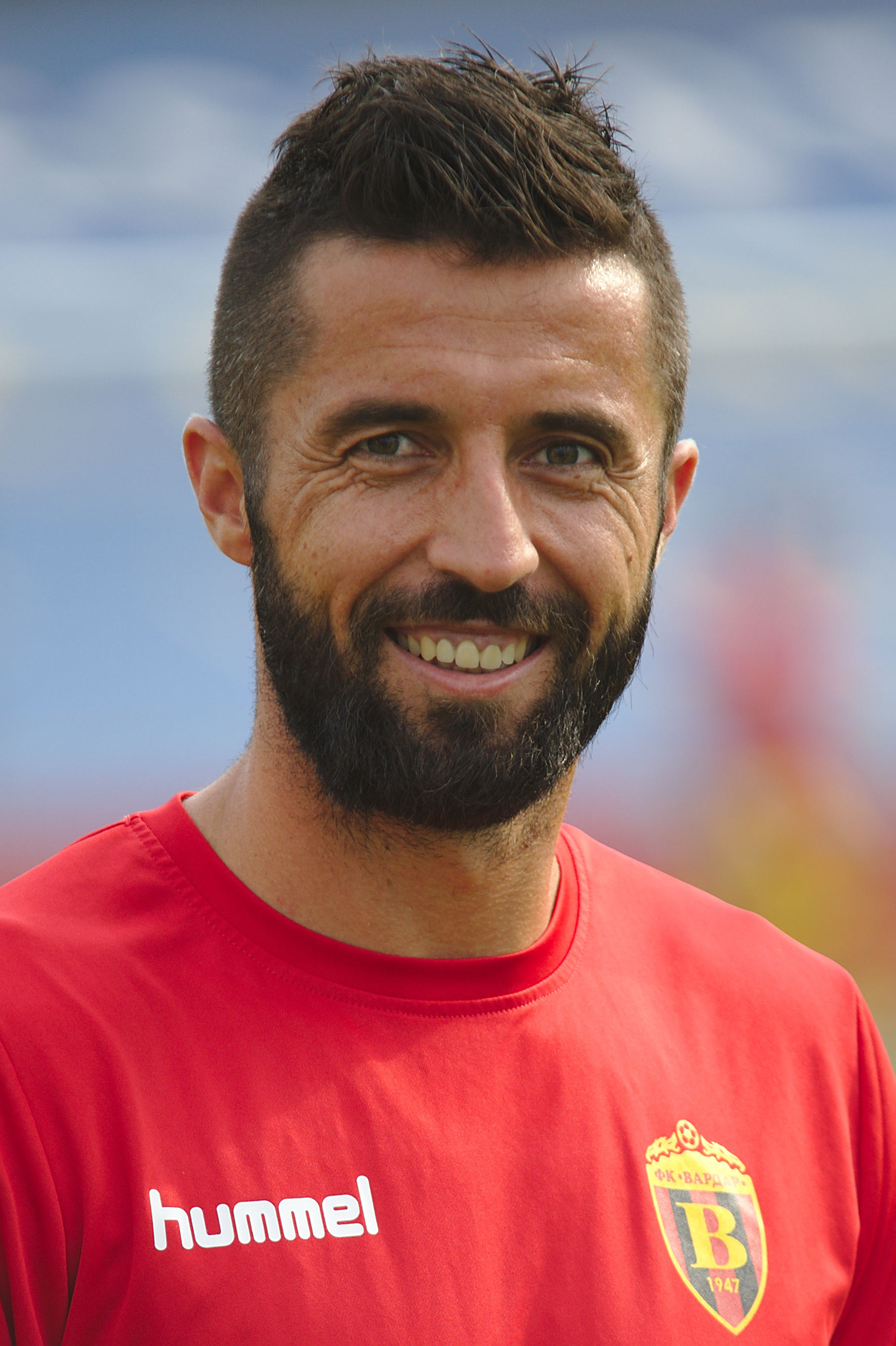
Aco Stojkov (56) matches (22) goals for FK Vardar

=== First time in Europa League group stage ===
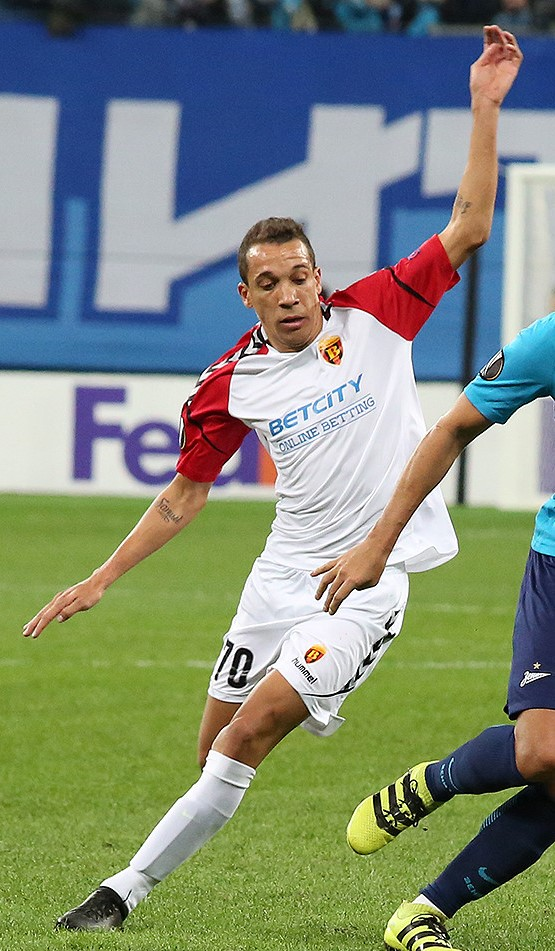
Felipe

In the 2017–18 Champions League second qualifying round, Vardar were drawn against Swedish side Malmö FF, in the first leg away, they have played a draw (1–1) and won the second leg in Strumica (3–1), with the goals of Boban Grncharov, Tigran Barseghyan and Boban Nikolov. In the third qualifying round, Vardar was played against Danish side F.C. Copenhagen, they won first leg at the home in Skopje (1–0), with the goal of Jonathan Balotelli. In the second leg in Copenhagen, Vardar had a result which would lead to the play-off round of Champions League, but in last 15 minutes, Copenhagen scored two goals, and Vardar lost the match (4–1), and its eliminated from the Champions League.

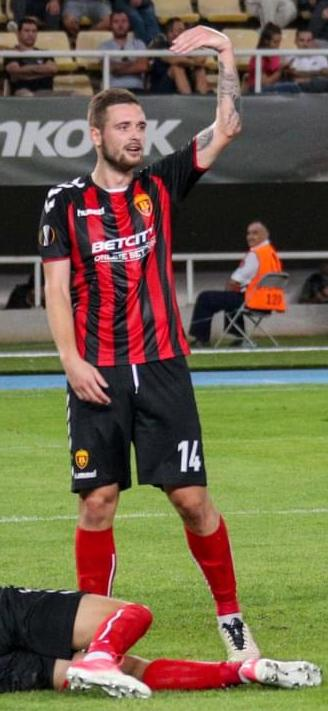
Darko Velkovski

But, the participation in the European competitions in that season Vardar continued in the Europa League play-off round, in whom were drawn against Turkish giants Fenerbahçe. Surprisingly, Vardar won both matches against them, in the first leg in Skopje won 2–0, with the goals of Barseghyan and the bizarre own goal of Mehmet Topal, and in the second leg in Istanbul 2–1, with a goals of Jaba Jighauri and Nikola Gligorov, and Vardar qualified for the group stage of the Europa League for the first time in its history and became the first Macedonian club to qualify for the group stage of a European competition. In the group stage, Vardar were drawn in Group L against Zenit Saint Petersburg, Rosenborg and Real Sociedad. In the debut match, Vardar were outclassed by Zenit in Skopje (0–5) and lost the match in Trondheim against Rosenborg (3–1), but was scored first goal in the group stages of European competition by Juan Felipe. In third match Vardar was again trashed by Real Sociedad at home (0–6), which was a highest defeat in the European competition matches.

However, FК Vardar later won a historic first point in European Cups with a 1:1 draw in the home match against Rosenborg BK.

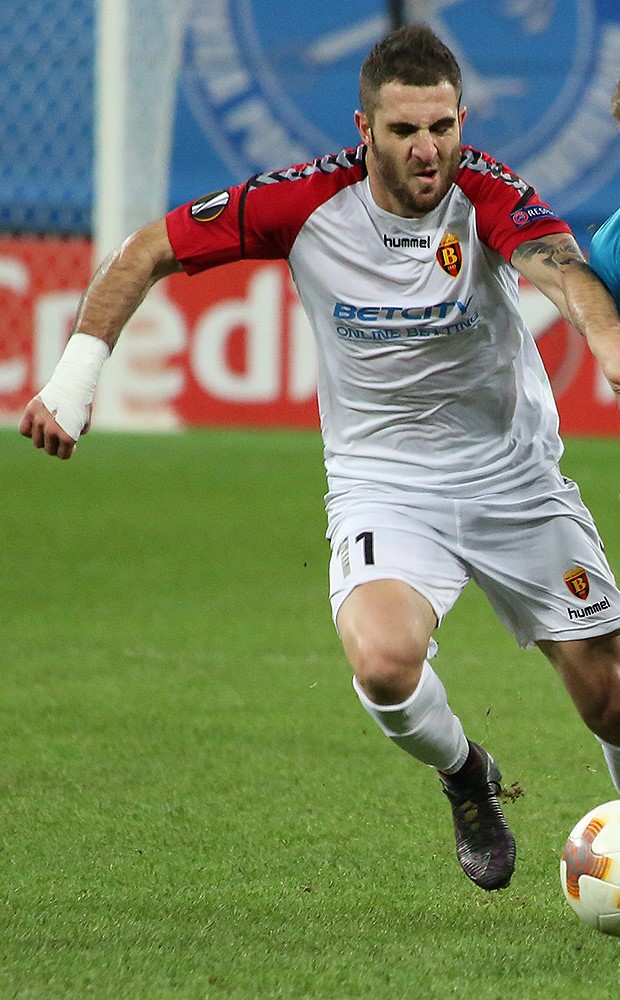
Tigran Barseghyan

== Grounds ==
=== City Park Arena ===
The City Park Arena with a capacity of 36.011 spectators, it ranks among the 10 biggest stadiums in the Balkans. The field is of 105 x 68 m dimensions. There are two big boards that are located on the east and west sides, size 18 × 6 m. The arena has 494 VIP seats and 386 seats for the media on the northern stand. 80% of the space in the arena is sheltered in case of bad weather. The arena is a multifunctional sports facility located in Skopje, North Macedonia. It is named after singer Toše Proeski and is mostly used for football matches. On 25 July 2012, one of the most visited matches of FK Vardar against FC BATE Borisov was played in the second qualifying round of the 2012–13 UEFA Champions League. The west stand is known by the Komiti, FK Vardar's most faithful fans. National Arena Toše Proeski was the host of 2017 UEFA Super Cup, Macedonia's first UEFA club competition final.

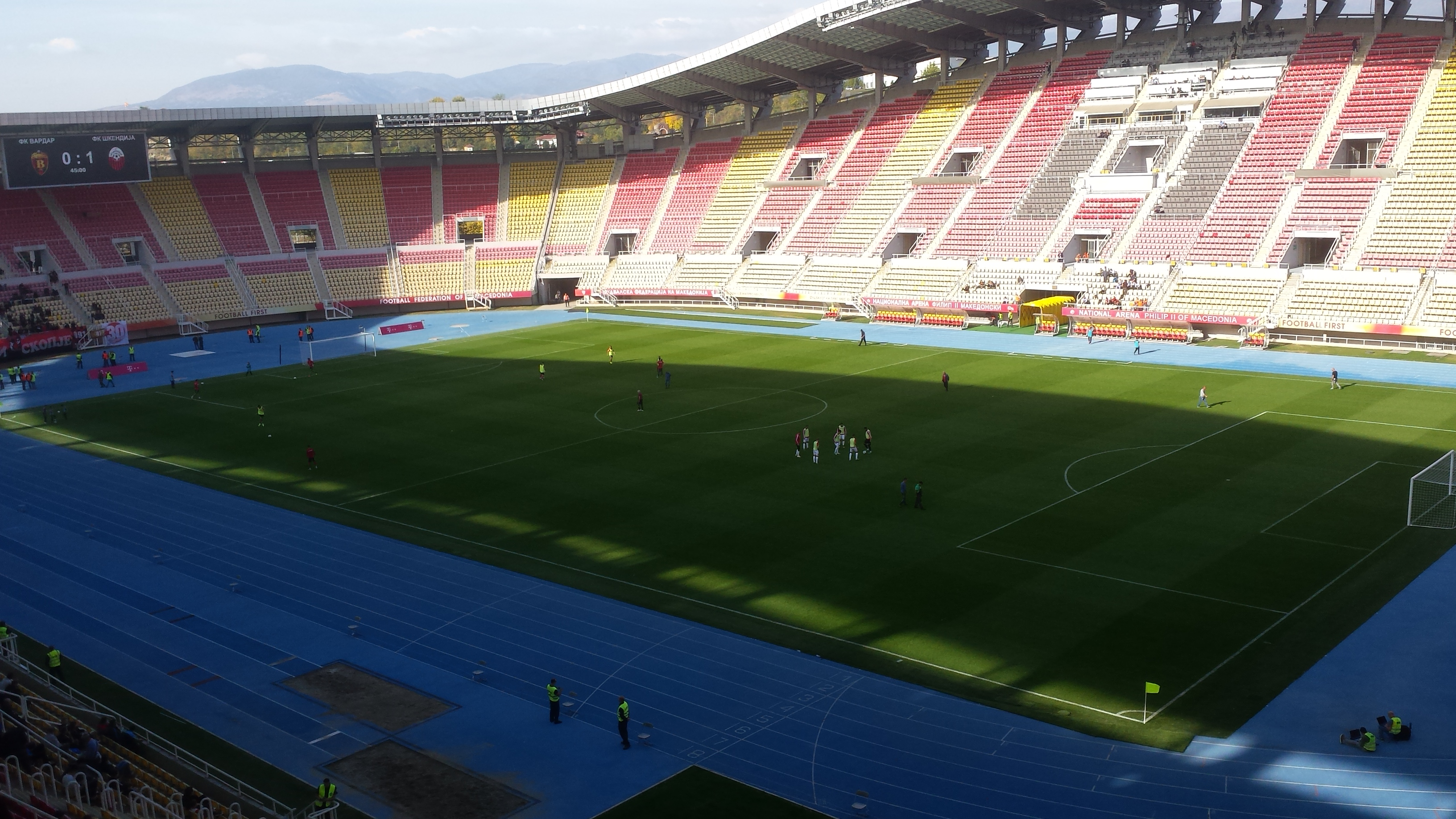
Home Ground

== Supporters ==
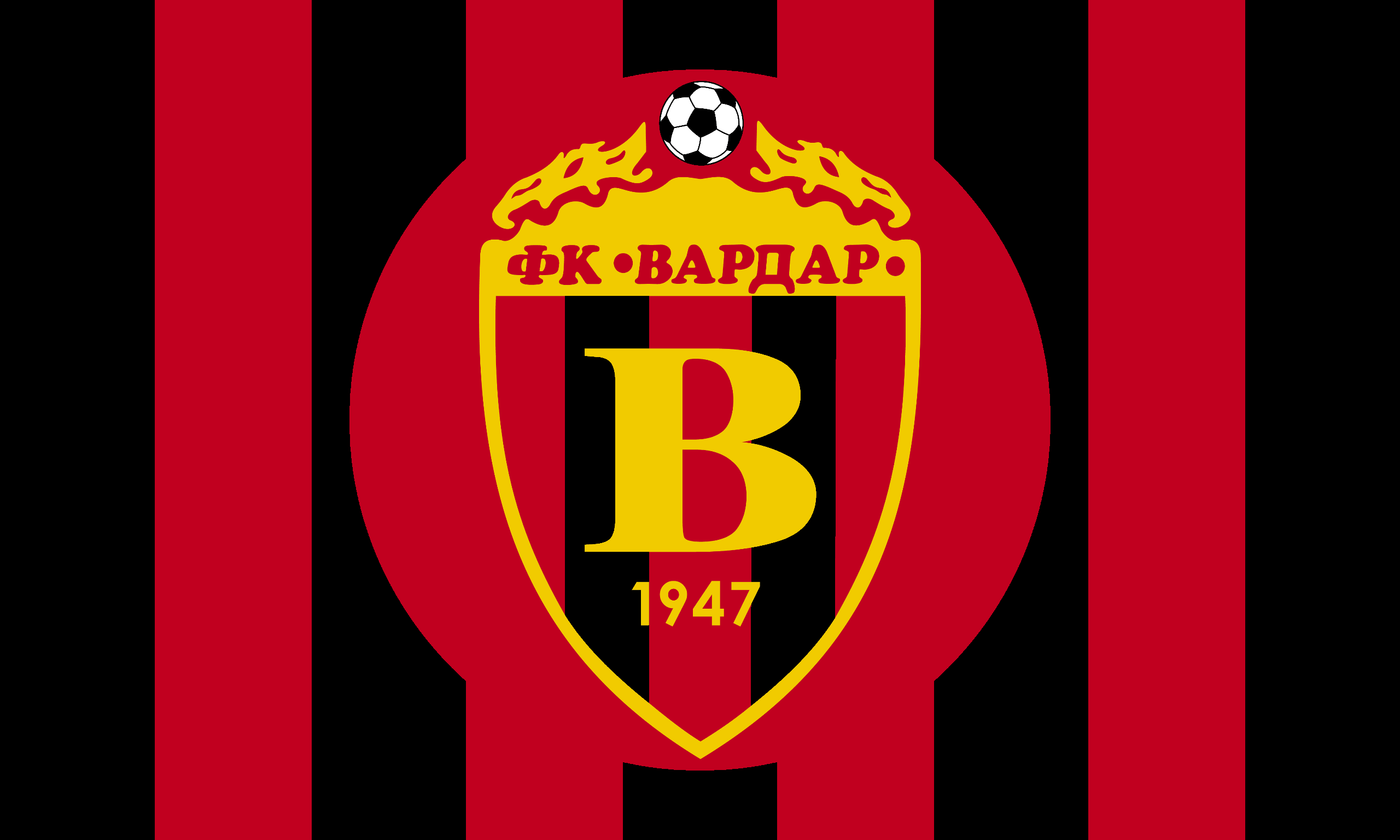
The flag of FK Vardar

FK Vardar supporters are known as "Komiti". Komiti are the first organized supporters group of Vardar and they were founded on 4 June 1987 in Skopje, at the match between FK Vardar and Red Star Belgrade. It owns 15% of the club through an association.

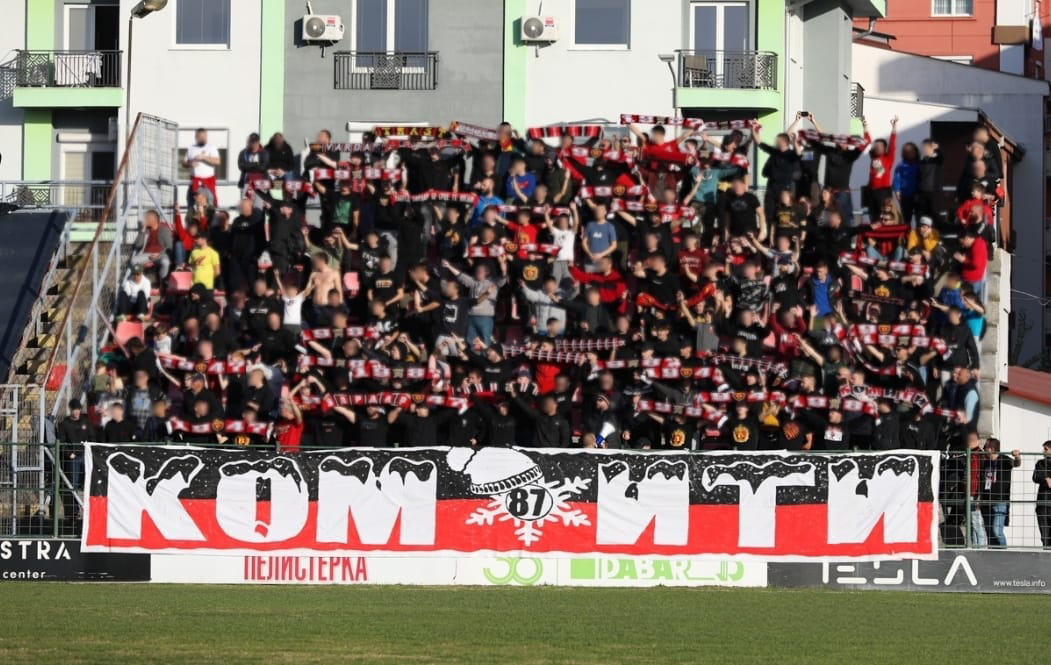
Komiti in 2023 with scarves on the stadium

== Rivalries ==
=== Eternal Derby ===
The fixture between Vardar and FK Pelister is the biggest and most violent match in North Macedonia. An important aspect of this match-up is the intense rivalry in the Macedonian tifo scene between the supporter clubs Komiti and Čkembari. The rivalry began in the season 1989–90 at a match in Skopje, between FK Vardar and Red Star Belgrade. A conflict occurred between the "Skopje fans" and a few "Bitola fans" who went to cheer for FK Vardar, who at that time was the most popular Macedonian football club in the former Yugoslavia. On 8 March 1991 in Bitola, FK Pelister and FK Vardar met in the Yugoslav second league and the first incident occurred. From that day forward, started the big rivalry between Komiti and Čkembari along with the Vardar–Pelister match becoming the eternal derby. In recent years the rivalry wained slightly in importance as FK Vardar stopped being as competitive.

== Honours ==
As of 15 May 2026
Legacy titles: SK Vardar, Pobeda Skopje, Gragjanski, Makedonija

- Winners (10) 1922, 1923, 1927, 1928, 1929, 1936, 1937, 1938, 1946, 1947

=== Domestic ===
- Macedonian First League
  - Winners (12): 1992–93, 1993–94, 1994–95, 2001–02, 2002–03, 2011–12, 2012–13, 2014–15, 2015–16, 2016–17, 2019–20, 2025–26
- Macedonian Football Cup
  - Winners (6): 1992–93, 1994–95, 1997–98, 1998–99, 2006–07, 2024–25
- Macedonian Republic Cup
  - Winners (12): 1955–56, 1965–66, 1966–67, 1967–68, 1968–69, 1969–70, 1970–71, 1971–72, 1972–73, 1979–80, 1980–81, 1991–92
- Macedonian Football Supercup
  - Winners (2): 2013, 2015
- Yugoslav Cup
  - Winners (1): 1960–61

=== European ===
- Balkans Cup
  - Runners-up (2): 1972, 1974

== European Competitions ==
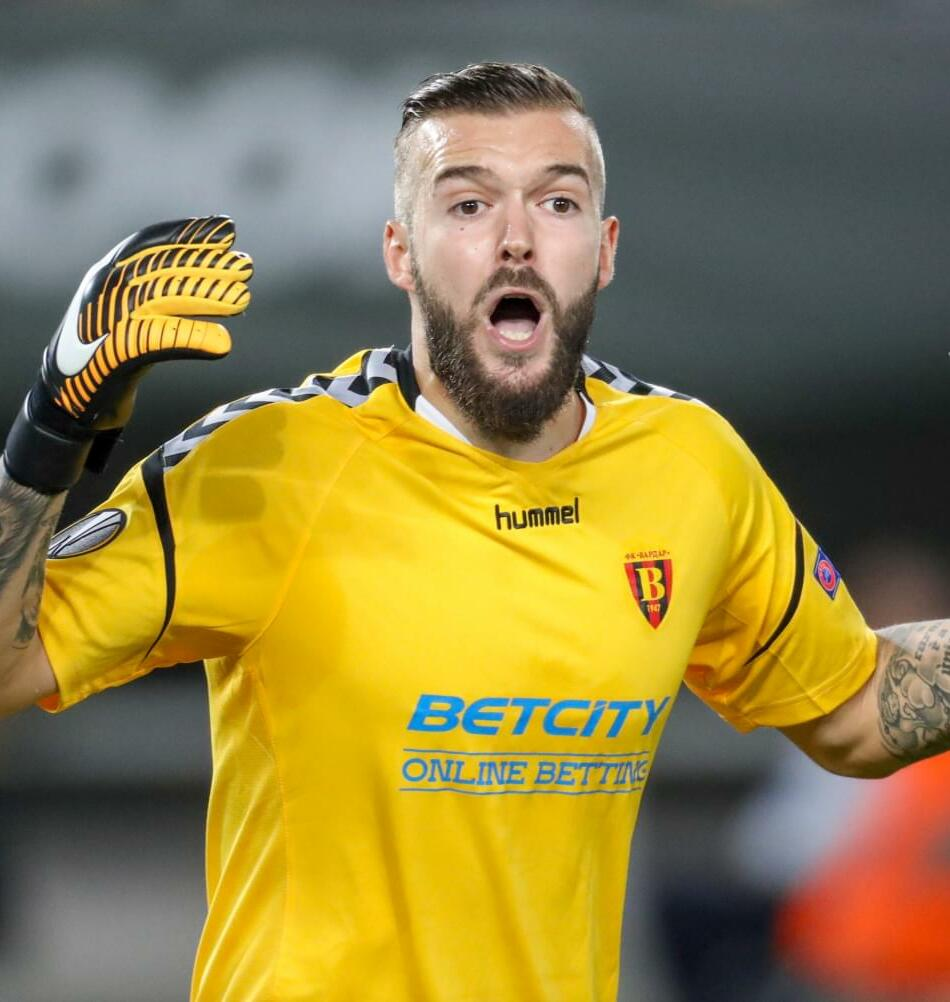
Filip Gačevski

FK Vardar's first competitive European match was a 0–5 loss against Dunfermline Athletic in the 1961–62 European Cup Winners' Cup. Muarem Zekir holds the record for most appearances in Europe for the club with 21. Top scorer in UEFA club competitions is Wandeir with 13 goals. The biggest win in UEFA competition was against Ethnikos Achna FC in the 2004 Intertoto Cup defeating them twice by the score of 5–1 and 10–2 on aggregate.

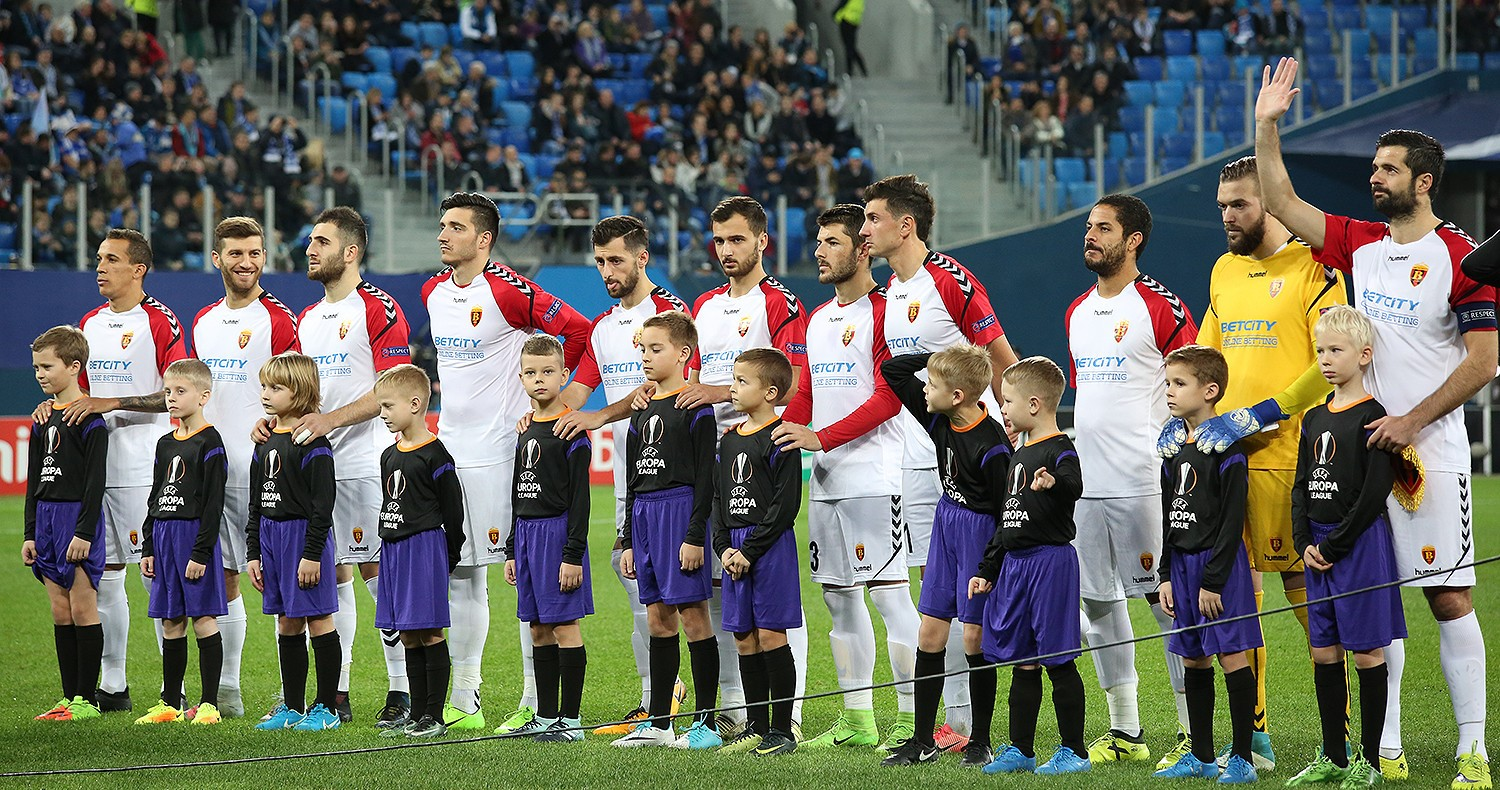
FK Vardar in Saint Petersburg against FC Zenit on 23 November 2017

FK Vardar became the first Macedonian club to qualify for the group stages of a European competition, after beating Fenerbahçe S.K. in the 2017–18 UEFA Europa League playoffs.

Notable wins

Season	Match	Score
Champions League / European Cup
2003–04	Vardar – (Russia) CSKA Moscow	2–1
2017–18	Vardar – (Sweden) Malmö FF	3–1
2017–18	Vardar – (Denmark) F.C. Copenhagen	1–0
Cup Winners' Cup
1961–62	Vardar – (Scotland) Dunfermline Athletic F.C.	2–0
Mitropa Cup / UEFA Cup
1968–69	Vardar – (Austria) LASK	2–1
1968–69	Vardar – (Italy) Cagliari Calcio	1–0
1968–69	Vardar – (Italy) Cagliari Calcio	rematch 1–0
1985–86	Vardar – (Romania) FC Dinamo București	1–0
2017–18	Vardar – (Turkey) Fenerbahçe S.K.	2–0
2017–18	Vardar – (Turkey) Fenerbahçe S.K.	rematch 2–1
UEFA Conference League
2025–26	Vardar – (Switzerland) FC Lausanne-Sport	2–1

== Regional Competitions ==
Season	Competition	Round	Club	Home	Away	Aggregate
1964–66	Balkans Cup	Group A	(Bulgaria) Spartak Plovdiv	0–3	1–4	4th out of 4
1964–66	Balkans Cup	Group A	(Romania) Farul	0–4	0–1	4th out of 4
1964–66	Balkans Cup	Group A	(Greece) Olympiacos	2–2	0–1	4th out of 4
1966–67	Balkans Cup	Group B	(Greece) AEK Athens	1–1	0–1	4th out of 4
1966–67	Balkans Cup	Group B	(Bulgaria) Lokomotiv Sofia	0–3	1–4	4th out of 4
1966–67	Balkans Cup	Group B	(Romania) Farul	4–0	0–2	4th out of 4
1967–68	Mitropa Cup	R16	(Austria) LASK	2–1	0–0	2–1
1967–68	Mitropa Cup	QF	(Italy) Cagliari	1–0	1–0	2–0
1967–68	Mitropa Cup	SF	(Czechoslovakia) Spartak Trnava	2–2	1–2	3–4
1968–69	Mitropa Cup	R16	(Austria) Admira Wien	2–2	0–3	2–5
1969–70	Mitropa Cup	R16	(Hungary) Vasas	2–3	1–1	3–4
1971–72	Balkans Cup	Group A	(Greece) Kavala	5–1	0–1	1st out of 3
1971–72	Balkans Cup	Group A	(Albania) Shkëndija Tiranë	1–1	1–1	1st out of 3
1971–72	Balkans Cup	Final	(Bulgaria) Trakia Plovdiv	4–0	0–5	4-5
1973–74	Balkans Cup	Group B	(Albania) Partizani	2–0	1–2	1st out of 3
1973–74	Balkans Cup	Group B	(Greece) Larissa	7–0	3–0	1st out of 3
1973–74	Balkans Cup	Final	(Bulgaria) Akademik Sofia	0–0	1–2	1–2

== Rankings ==
=== UEFA Ranking ===
As of 13 March 2024

Rank	Country	Team	Points
416	(Gibraltar)	Mons Calpe S.C.	1.158
417	(North Macedonia)	FC Struga	1.100
418	(North Macedonia)	FK Vardar	1.100
419	(North Macedonia)	FK Rabotnichki	1.100
420	(Andorra)	Atlètic Club d'Escaldes	1.033

=== Club world ranking ===
As of 11 September 2025

Rank	Team	Points
459	(Bahrain) Al-Khaldiya	59.00
459	(Panama) Plaza Amador	59.00
459	(New Zealand) Auckland City	59.00
459	(Bolivia) The Strongest	59.00
459	(North Macedonia) FK Vardar	59.00

== Players ==
=== Current squad ===
As of 7 July 2026

Note: Flags indicate national team as defined under FIFA eligibility rules; some limited exceptions apply. Players may hold more than one non-FIFA nationality.

No.	Pos.	Nation	Player
1	GK	MKD	Daniel Dikovski
2	MF	MKD	Hristijan Jevtoski
3	DF	MKD	Mihail Manevski
4	DF	CRO	Mislav Matić
5	DF	MKD	Filip Najdovski
6	MF	MKD	David Babunski
8	MF	MKD	Boban Nikolov
9	FW	MKD	Azer Omeragikj (captain)
10	FW	BIH	Goran Zakarić
14	DF	MKD	Darko Velkovski
16	FW	MKD	Nikola Ristevski
17	DF	MKD	Ediz Spahiu
18	DF	MKD	Nenad Mishkovski
21	DF	MKD	Georgije Jankulov
22	MF	MKD	Dimitar Todorovski

No.	Pos.	Nation	Player
23	MF	MKD	Filip Duranski
24	FW	MKD	Ilija Mitanoski
27	DF	MKD	Filip Cvetkovski
30	FW	MKD	Ognen Jakov
31	FW	MKD	Matej Nikolov
32	FW	ARG	Diego Castañeda
34	FW	ARG	Ian Puleio
49	FW	MKD	Dimitar Danev
71	MF	POR	Miguel Pires
77	MF	MKD	Bljeron Bajrami
88	MF	SRB	Nemanja Bosančić
95	GK	MKD	Davor Taleski
97	FW	MKD	Ivo Markovski
99	FW	ARG	Joaquín Torres

=== Out on loan ===
Note: Flags indicate national team as defined under FIFA eligibility rules; some limited exceptions apply. Players may hold more than one non-FIFA nationality.

No.	Pos.	Nation	Player
—	GK	MKD	Ili Ziberi (at Teteks until 30 June 2027)
—	DF	ARG	Manuel Cuestas (at Jezero until 30 June 2027)
—	DF	MKD	Andrej Murdjeski (at Skopje until 30 June 2027)

No.	Pos.	Nation	Player
—	MF	NGR	Ibrahim Olaosebikan (at Arsimi until 30 June 2027)
—	MF	MKD	Darko Sekovski (at Skopje until 30 June 2027)
—	FW	MKD	Andrej Cvetkovski (at Skopje until 30 June 2027)

== Club officials ==
=== Technical staff ===
Head coach	(Montenegro) Miodrag Božović
Assistant coach	(Montenegro) Dejan Mrvaljevic
Assistant coach	(North Macedonia) Matija Mirkov
Assistant coach	(North Macedonia) Marjan Gerasimovski
Assistant coach	(North Macedonia) Gogo Jovčev
Fitness coach	(North Macedonia) Metin Dalip
Goalkeeper coach	(North Macedonia) Metodija Velkovski
Physiotherapist	(North Macedonia) Jovan Dimovski
Physiotherapist	(North Macedonia) Viktor Stojanov
Physiotherapist	(North Macedonia) Toshe Trajkovski
Doctor	(North Macedonia) Miki Gjoreski
Economic	(North Macedonia) Ljupcho Dimovski

Last updated: 2 September 2026
Source: FK Vardar

=== Board members ===
Co-owner	Atila Bijen Jalili
Co-owner	Komiti Skopje
Chairman	Milorad Milenkovski
Sporting director	Vlatko Kolev
Secretary	Nikola Stojanovski
Technical operator	George Spasovski
Technical secretary	Biljana Blazhevska
Security commissioner	Aleksandar Kolevski

== Club records ==
As of 29 May 2017

- Most goals scored: Andon Dončevski (217 goals).
- Best goal scoring ratio: Darko Pančev 207 matches/132 goals (0,65 goals per match).
- Most league goals scored: Vasil Ringov (97 goals).
- Most league goals scored in one Macedonian First League season: Saša Ćirić 1992–93 (36 goals).
- Most goals scored in European competition: Wandeir 2003–05 (12 goals).
- Most appearances: Kočo Dimitrovski 845 (416 league matches), Metodije Spasovski 647 (375 league matches), Gjore Jovanovski 486 (271 league matches).
- Most accomplished coach: Gjoko Hadžievski (5 league titles and 2 national cups).
- Biggest win in Macedonian league: 30 May 1993, FK Vardar 11–0 FK Vardarski.
- Biggest win in UEFA competition: 19 June 2004, Ethnikos Achnas 1–5 FK Vardar.
- Biggest single game attendance: FK Vardar-FC Bate Borisov 0:0 (31.322 spectators) First Round Champions League (2012–2013)
- Most successful General manager 1990-1997 Dragan Tomovski 3 league titles and 3 national cups.
- Most sucessiful President Filip Gjurcinovski 3 league titles 2 national cups

== See also ==
- KK Vardar (basketball)
- RK Vardar (handball)
