= 1969–70 Mitropa Cup =

Tournament details
- Teams: 16

Final positions
- Champions: (Hungary) Vasas (5th title)
- Runners-up: (Czechoslovakia) Inter Bratislava

Tournament statistics
- Matches played: 29
- Goals scored: 86 (2.97 per match)

The 1969–70 Mitropa Cup was the 30th season of the Mitropa football club tournament. It was won by Vasas who beat Inter Bratislava in the two-legged final 4–1 on aggregate.

== Round of 16 ==
Team 1	Agg.	Team 2	1st leg	2nd leg
Inter Bratislava (Czechoslovakia)	6–1	(Austria) First Vienna	6–1	w/o
Wacker Innsbruck (Austria)	3–3 (a)	(Hungary) Csepel	1–2	2–1
Hajduk Split (Socialist Federal Republic of Yugoslavia)	3–1	(Italy) Brescia	3–1	0–0
Honvéd (Hungary)	3–2	(Italy) Lazio	1–1	2–1
Vasas (Hungary)	4–3	(Socialist Federal Republic of Yugoslavia) Vardar	1–1	3–2
Slavia Prague (Czechoslovakia)	7–1	(Italy) Hellas Verona	4–1	3–0
Radnički Kragujevac (Socialist Federal Republic of Yugoslavia)	2–1	(Czechoslovakia) Lokomotíva Košice	2–0	0–1
Admira Wien (Austria)	4–2	(Czechoslovakia) Bohemians Prague	2–1	2–1

== Quarter-finals ==
Team 1	Agg.	Team 2	1st leg	2nd leg
Slavia Prague (Czechoslovakia)	3–3 (a)	(Socialist Federal Republic of Yugoslavia) Hajduk Split	1–1	2–2
Admira Wien (Austria)	1–7	(Hungary) Vasas	0–4	1–3
Radnički Kragujevac (Socialist Federal Republic of Yugoslavia)	2–5	(Hungary) Honvéd	2–1	0–4
Wacker Innsbruck (Austria)	1–3	(Czechoslovakia) Inter Bratislava	0–3	1–0

=== Semi-finals ===
Team 1	Agg.	Team 2	1st leg	2nd leg
Slavia Prague (Czechoslovakia)	1–2	(Hungary) Vasas	1–1	0–1
Honvéd (Hungary)	1–3	(Czechoslovakia) Inter Bratislava	0–1	1–2

=== Final ===
Team 1	Agg.	Team 2	1st leg	2nd leg
Inter Bratislava (Czechoslovakia)	3–5	(Hungary) Vasas	2–1	1–4

== See also ==
- 1969–70 European Cup
- 1969–70 European Cup Winners' Cup
- 1969–70 Inter-Cities Fairs Cup
