= 1968–69 Mitropa Cup =

Tournament details
- Teams: 16

Final positions
- Champions: (Czechoslovakia) Inter Bratislava (1st title)
- Runners-up: (Czechoslovakia) Sklo Union Teplice

Tournament statistics
- Matches played: 30
- Goals scored: 100 (3.33 per match)

The 1968–69 Mitropa Cup was the 29th season of the Mitropa football club tournament. It was won by Inter Bratislava who beat Sklo Union Teplice in the two-legged final 4–1 on aggregate.

== Round of 16 ==
| Team 1 | Agg. | Team 2 | 1st leg | 2nd leg |
|---|---|---|---|---|
| Honvéd (Hungary) | 0–2 | (Socialist Federal Republic of Yugoslavia) Željezničar | 0–1 | 0–1 |
| Tatabányai Bányász (Hungary) | 3–6 | (Czechoslovakia) Sklo Union Teplice | 3–3 | 0–3 |
| Budapest Honvéd (Hungary) | 2–2 (a) | (Italy) Cagliari | 1–0 | 1–2 |
| Inter Bratislava (Czechoslovakia) | 3–1 | (Italy) Palermo | 3–0 | 0–1 |
| Vasas (Hungary) | 6–4 | (Austria) Sturm Graz | 4–3 | 2–1 |
| Atalanta (Italy) | 3–9 | (Socialist Federal Republic of Yugoslavia) Red Star Belgrade | 2–4 | 3–5 |
| Vardar (Socialist Federal Republic of Yugoslavia) | 2–5 | (Austria) Admira Wien | 2–2 | 0–3 |
| Baník Ostrava (Czechoslovakia) | 5–3 | (Socialist Federal Republic of Yugoslavia) Hajduk Split | 4–1 | 1–2 |

== Quarter-finals ==
| Team 1 | Agg. | Team 2 | 1st leg | 2nd leg |
|---|---|---|---|---|
| Željezničar (Socialist Federal Republic of Yugoslavia) | 5–1 | (Czechoslovakia) Baník Ostrava | 1–1 | 4–0 |
| Red Star Belgrade (Socialist Federal Republic of Yugoslavia) | 3–5 | (Hungary) Vasas | 1–2 | 2–3 |
| Wiener Sport-Club (Austria) | 1–3 | (Czechoslovakia) Sklo Union Teplice | 1–1 | 0–2 |
| Admira Wien (Austria) | 3–3 (a) | (Czechoslovakia) Inter Bratislava | 2–2 | 1–1 |

== Semi-finals ==
| Team 1 | Agg. | Team 2 | 1st leg | 2nd leg |
|---|---|---|---|---|
| Inter Bratislava (Czechoslovakia) | 3–2 | (Hungary) Vasas | 2–2 | 1–0 |
| Željezničar (Socialist Federal Republic of Yugoslavia) | 2–3 | (Czechoslovakia) Sklo Union Teplice | 1–1 | 1–2 |

== Final ==
| Team 1 | Agg. | Team 2 | 1st leg | 2nd leg |
|---|---|---|---|---|
| Inter Bratislava (Czechoslovakia) | 4–1 | (Czechoslovakia) Sklo Union Teplice | 4–1 | 0–0 |

== See also ==
- 1968–69 European Cup
- 1968–69 European Cup Winners' Cup
- 1968–69 Inter-Cities Fairs Cup
