= Eternal derby (North Macedonia) =

Football rivalry in North Macedonia

Eternal derby Macedonian derby
- Other names: Вечно дерби Македонско дерби
- Location: North Macedonia (Skopje and Bitola)
- Teams: Vardar; Pelister
- First meeting: 5 August 1990 (official)
- Latest meeting: Pelister 0–0 Vardar (Macedonian First League) (8 April 2026)
- Stadiums: Toše Proeski Arena (Vardar); Petar Miloševski (Pelister)

Statistics
- Total meetings: 83
- Most wins: Vardar (46)
- Largest victory: Vardar 7–0 Pelister (8 May 1996)

Eternal derby (Macedonian: Вечно дерби), also known as the Macedonia derby (Macedonian: Македонско дерби), is the name given to matches between the two most popular clubs from North Macedonia, the Skopje-based FK Vardar and Bitola-based FK Pelister, supported by Komiti and Čkembari respectively, with fans at times engaging in hooliganism during the derby.

The rivalry can be traced back to the 1989–90 season and a match in Skopje, between FK Vardar and Red Star Belgrade. A conflict occurred between the "Skopje fans" and a few Bitola fans who went to cheer for Vardar, who at that time was the most popular Macedonian football club in the former Yugoslavia. On 5 August 1990 in Bitola, Pelister and Vardar met in the Yugoslav second league and the first incident occurred. From that day forward, started the big rivalry between Komiti and Chkembari along with the Vardar-Pelister match becoming the Eternal derby of Macedonia.

However, the rivalry is playing at the stands but not much at the ground because Vardar there are many more honours than a rival from Bitola. In a present time there is a small number of attendance and Pelister were many times and Vardar once relegated to the Macedonian Second League so the rivalry has lost its formerly importance. As of May 2018, there have been 68 derbies played in total since the establishment of the Macedonian championship in 1992, with Vardar winning 38 and Pelister 14 games, while 16 matches ended in a draw.

Location of both teams

== Statistics ==
The records does not include the awarded matches and a matches decided by a one goal difference.

=== Head-to-head ===
Competition	Played	Vardar wins	Draws	Pelister wins	Vardar goals	Pelister goals
Yugoslav championship (1990–1992)
First League	2	2	0	0	5	1
Second League	2	1	1	0	2	1
Yugoslavia totals	4	3	1	0	7	2
Macedonian championship (1992–present)
First League	63	34	17	12	99	66
Second League	2	0	2	0	3	3
Macedonian Cup	14	8	3	3	21	11
Macedonia totals	76	41	20	14	118	76
All Time	82	46	20	16	130	82

Last updated on 8 April 2026.

=== Records ===
- Record League win
  - Vardar
    - Home: Vardar – Pelister 7–0, Gradski stadion, 8 May 1996
      (Karadzhov, Markovski, Nikolovski, Trajchev, Serafimovski, Stojkoski, Stanić)
    - Away: Pelister – Vardar 1–3, Petar Miloševski Football Stadium, 29 March 2025
      (Kerim – Zakarić, Mato (2))
      and Pelister – Vardar 0–2, Stadion Tumbe Kafe, 13 April 2003
      (Vasoski, Bozhinovski)
  - Pelister
    - Home: Pelister – Vardar 2–0, Stadion Tumbe Kafe, 4 April 2021
      (Manevski (2))
    - Away: Vardar – Pelister 1–3, Gradski stadion, 26 April 2008
      (Peev – Miranda (3))
- Record Cup win
  - Vardar
    - Home: Vardar – Pelister 4–1, Philip II Arena, 30 September 2015
      (Dashyan, Velkovski, Hambardzumyan, Grncharov – Nedanoski)
      and Vardar – Pelister 3–0, Gradski stadion, 17 April 1996
      (Shakiri, Serafimovski, Petreski)
    - Away: Pelister – Vardar 0–2, Stadion Goce Delchev, 21 October 2015
      (Trajkovski o.g., Stojkov)

- Longest sequence of League wins
  - Vardar: 7, 17 August 2002 – 11 October 2007
    - Home: 4, 23 August 2008 – 30 September 2012
    - Away: 6, 1 April 2001 – 29 April 2007
  - Pelister: 2, 16 March 2008 – 26 April 2008
    - Home: 3, 29 October 1995 – 14 March 1998
    - Away: 1
- Longest sequence of Cup wins
  - Vardar: 4, 7 November 2012 – 21 October 2015
    - Home: 4, 11 April 2007–present
    - Away: 2, 7 November 2012 – 21 October 2015
  - Pelister: 3, 15 March 2000 – 25 February 2001
    - Home: 2, 15 March 2000 – 25 February 2001
    - Away: 1

- Longest sequence of unbeaten League matches
  - Vardar: 15, 3 October 1998 – 11 October 2007
    - Home: 15, 24 February 1991 – 11 October 2007
    - Away: 8, 3 October 1998 – 29 April 2007 and 6 March 2013 – 4 October 2020
  - Pelister: 7, 1 April 2018 – 9 May 2023
    - Home: 5, 7 November 1993 – 14 March 1998 and 16 March 2008 – 28 March 2010
    - Away: 3, 13 April 2013 – 23 April 2014 and 13 May 2018 – 9 May 2023
- Longest sequence of unbeaten Cup matches
  - Vardar: 7, 4 April 2001–present
    - Home: 4, 4 April 2001–present
    - Away: 3, 2 May 2007–present
  - Pelister: 4, 1 May 1996 – 25 February 2001
    - Home: 4, 1 May 1996 – 2 May 2007
    - Away: 1

- Bigger grade difference
  - Vardar
    - Point system 3–1–0: +44 (72 vs 28), 2002–03
  - Pelister
    - Point system 3–1–0: +18 (47 vs 29), 1999–2000

== Official match results ==
=== Key ===
Colors

Vardar win
Draw
Pelister win

Competitions

- SF = Semi-finals
- QF = Quarter-finals
- R16 = Round of 16

=== Results ===
Season	Competition	Date	Home team	Result	Away team	Goals (Home)	Goals (Away)
1990–91	YUG Second League	5 August 1990	Pelister	1–1^{1}	Vardar	Ćirić	Gunev
1990–91	YUG Second League	24 February 1991	Vardar	1–0	Pelister	Ranđelović	
1991–92	YUG First League	1 September 1991	Vardar	2–1	Pelister	Babunski, Kostov	Grozdanov
1991–92	YUG First League	8 March 1992	Pelister	0–3^{2}	Vardar		
1992–93	First League	28 November 1992	Vardar	1–1	Pelister	Urošević	V. Micevski
1992–93	Macedonian Cup Final	23 May 1993	Vardar	1–0	Pelister	Savov	
1992–93	First League	13 June 1993	Pelister	0–3^{3}	Vardar		
1993–94	First League	7 November 1993	Pelister	2–1	Vardar		
1993–94	First League	22 May 1994	Vardar	4–0	Pelister	Spaseski (2), Eftimov, Miloshevski	
1994–95	First League	2 October 1994	Pelister	0–0	Vardar		
1994–95	First League	15 April 1995	Vardar	6–3	Pelister	Petreski (2), Ćirić, Miloshevski, Shakiri (2)	T. Micevski (3)
1995–96	First League	29 October 1995	Pelister	2–1	Vardar		
1995–96	Macedonian Cup SF	17 April 1996	Vardar	3–0	Pelister	Shakiri, Serafimovski, Petreski	
1995–96	Macedonian Cup SF	1 May 1996	Pelister	1–1	Vardar		
1995–96	First League	8 May 1996	Vardar	7–0	Pelister	Karadzhov, Markovski, Nikolovski, Trajchev, Serafimovski, Stojkoski, Stanić	
1996–97	First League	8 September 1996	Vardar	0–0	Pelister		
1996–97	First League	23 March 1997	Pelister	1–0	Vardar	Jakimovski	
1997–98	First League	31 August 1997	Vardar	1–1	Pelister		
1997–98	First League	14 March 1998	Pelister	3–2	Vardar		
1998–99	First League	3 October 1998	Pelister	1–2	Vardar		
1998–99	First League	30 April 1999	Vardar	2–1	Pelister		
1999–2000	First League	21 November 1999	Vardar	3–2	Pelister	Petreski, Krstev, Shakiri	D. Glavevski, Sivevski
1999–2000	Macedonian Cup QF	15 March 2000	Pelister	1–0	Vardar		
1999–2000	Macedonian Cup QF	22 March 2000	Vardar	1–2	Pelister		
1999–2000	First League	28 May 2000	Pelister	1–1	Vardar	Stisniovski	Krstev
2000–01	First League	24 September 2000	Vardar	3–1	Pelister	Bozhinov, Shakiri, Miserdovski	Iliev
2000–01	Macedonian Cup QF	25 February 2001	Pelister	2–1	Vardar	Dimov, Momirovski	Beganović
2000–01	First League	1 April 2001	Pelister	0–1	Vardar		Miserdovski
2000–01	Macedonian Cup QF	4 April 2001	Vardar	3–2^{4}	Pelister	Zaharievski, Bozhinov, Beganović	Deliovski, Delovski
2001–02	First League	23 September 2001	Pelister	1–2	Vardar	Momirovski	Nachevski, Gjoshevski
2001–02	First League	25 November 2001	Vardar	2–2	Pelister	Bozhinov, Ristovski	V. Micevski, Stisniovski
2002–03	First League	17 August 2002	Pelister	1–2	Vardar	Pitoshka	Oliveira, Dimov
2002–03	First League	3 November 2002	Vardar	3–1	Pelister	Oliveira, Spasovski, Gjoshevski	Kapinkovski
2002–03	First League	13 April 2003	Pelister	0–2	Vardar		Vasoski, Bozhinovski
2006–07	First League	1 October 2006	Pelister	1–2	Vardar	Delovski	Naumov, Wandeir
2006–07	First League	17 December 2006	Vardar	2–1	Pelister	Ristevski, Naumov	Blazhevski
2006–07	Macedonian Cup SF	11 April 2007	Vardar	2–1	Pelister	Wandeir, Demiri	Dimov
2006–07	First League	29 April 2007	Pelister	1–2	Vardar	Blazhevski	Kirovski, Ristevski
2006–07	Macedonian Cup SF	2 May 2007	Pelister	1–1	Vardar	Momirovski	Ristevski
2007–08	First League	11 October 2007	Vardar	1–0	Pelister	Milosavljev	
2007–08	First League	16 March 2008	Pelister	2–1	Vardar	Todorovski, Elmazovski	Bajevski
2007–08	First League	26 April 2008	Vardar	1–3	Pelister	Peev	Miranda (3)
2008–09	First League	23 August 2008	Vardar	3–0	Pelister	Janchevski (3)	
2008–09	First League	16 November 2008	Pelister	0–0	Vardar		
2008–09	First League	12 April 2009	Pelister	0–0	Vardar		
2009–10	First League	25 October 2009	Pelister	1–0	Vardar	Altiparmakovski	
2009–10	First League	21 March 2010	Vardar	1–0	Pelister	S. Hristov	
2009–10	First League	28 March 2010	Pelister	1–0	Vardar	Veljanovski	
2010–11	First League	28 August 2010	Vardar	1–0	Pelister	Djangarovski	
2010–11	First League	27 November 2010	Pelister	1–2	Vardar	Talevski	Gjurgjevikj (2)
2010–11	First League	21 May 2011	Pelister	1–0	Vardar	Talevski	
2012–13	First League	30 September 2012	Vardar	3–1	Pelister	Petrov, Tanevski, Kostovski	B. Glavevski
2012–13	Macedonian Cup QF	7 November 2012	Pelister	0–1	Vardar		Petrov
2012–13	Macedonian Cup QF	21 November 2012	Vardar	2–0	Pelister	Petrov, Giménez	
2012–13	First League	6 March 2013	Pelister	0–0	Vardar		
2012–13	First League	13 April 2013	Vardar	0–1	Pelister		Elmazovski
2013–14	First League	6 October 2013	Pelister	1–2	Vardar	Júnior	Ademović, Stojkov
2013–14	First League	9 March 2014	Vardar	1–1	Pelister	I. Naumoski	Ljamchevski
2013–14	First League	23 April 2014	Vardar	0–0	Pelister		
2014–15	First League	3 August 2014	Pelister	0–1	Vardar		Petrov
2014–15	First League	4 October 2014	Vardar	1–0	Pelister	F. Petkovski	
2014–15	First League	22 March 2015	Vardar	1–1	Pelister	Ibričić	Todorovski
2015–16	Macedonian Cup R16^{5}	30 September 2015	Vardar	4–1	Pelister	Dashyan, Velkovski, Hambardzumyan, Grncharov	Nedanoski
2015–16	Macedonian Cup R16^{5}	21 October 2015	Pelister	0–2	Vardar		Trajkovski (o.g.), Stojkov
2016–17	First League	28 September 2016	Vardar	1–1	Pelister	Kojašević	Lucas
2016–17	First League	30 November 2016	Pelister	0–1	Vardar		Juan Felipe
2016–17	First League	9 April 2017	Vardar	3–1	Pelister	Boareto, Spirovski, Barseghyan	Kovachev
2016–17	First League	28 May 2017	Pelister	2–3	Vardar	Ilijoski, Bujchevski	Nikolov, P. Petkovski, Juan Felipe
2017–18	First League	24 September 2017	Pelister	0–1	Vardar		Blazhevski
2017–18	First League	19 November 2017	Vardar	1–0	Pelister	Musliu	
2017–18	First League	1 April 2018	Pelister	0–0	Vardar		
2017–18	First League	13 May 2018	Vardar	2–3	Pelister	Barseghyan, Blazhevski	Trifunovski, Konjarski, B. Naumovski
2020–21	First League	4 October 2020	Pelister	1–1	Vardar	Charleston (o.g.)	Cvetanoski
2020–21	First League	21 February 2021	Vardar	2–2	Pelister	F. Petkovski, Mirchevski	Pejaković, Manevski
2020–21	First League	4 April 2021	Pelister	2–0	Vardar	Manevski (2)	
2021–22	Macedonian Cup QF^{6}	15 December 2021	Pelister	0–0^{7}	Vardar		
2022–23	Second League	3 December 2022	Pelister	2–2	Vardar	N. Naumoski, Manevski	S. Hristov, Markoski
2022–23	Second League	9 May 2023	Vardar	1–1	Pelister	Desnikj	Manevski
2024–25	First League	18 August 2024	Vardar	1–0	Pelister	Dianessy	
2024–25	First League	3 November 2024	Pelister	1–0	Vardar	Ivanovski	
2024–25	First League	29 March 2025	Pelister	1–3	Vardar	Kerim	Zakarić, Mato (2)
2025–26	First League	8 August 2025	Vardar	4–1	Pelister	Danev (2), Mato, Castañeda	Bulatović
2025–26	First League	5 November 2025	Pelister	1–2	Vardar	P. Petkovski	Mato, Zakarić
2025–26	First League	8 April 2026	Pelister	0–0	Vardar		

^{1} Vardar won 4–2 on penalties and won the one point.
^{2} Match suspended at half-time (score: 0–0) due to the crowd trouble. Later the match was replayed on 1 April, but was another match suspended after 45 minutes (score: 0–1) because of attack on referee. Vardar were awarded a 0–3 win.
^{3} Match suspended before the kick-off due to the crowd trouble when Čkembari burned seats, collapsed the protective fence and clashed with the police. Vardar were awarded a 0–3 win.
^{4} The 2000–01 Macedonian Cup quarter-final tie was won by Pelister on away goals rule.
^{5} Pelister was played in the Second League in that season.
^{6} Vardar was played in the Second League in that season.
^{7} Pelister won 3–2 on penalties.

== Players who have played for both clubs (senior career) ==
- Goce Aleksovski
- Marjan Altiparmakovski
- Jovica Anđelković
- Nikola Avramovski
- Almir Bajramovski
- Dejan Blazhevski
- Dragan Bocheski
- Radenko Bojović
- Zoran Boshkovski
- Vladica Brdarovski
- Antonio Bujchevski
- Saša Ćirić
- Matej Cvetanovski
- Mile Dimov
- Ilir Elmazovski
- Simeon Hristov
- Kire Grozdanov
- Marko Jovanovski
- Dragi Kanatlarovski
- Nikola Karchev
- Vildan Kerim
- Pece Korunovski
- Vlatko Kostov
- Blagoja Kuleski
- Blagoja Ljamchevski
- Borche Manevski
- Toni Meglenski
- Gorazd Mihajlov
- Petar Miloshevski
- Sasho Miloshevski
- Gjorgji Mojsov
- Zlatko Nastevski
- Tome Pachovski
- Igor Pavlović
- Zoran Paunov
- Oliver Peev
- Filip Petrov
- Mirko Petrov
- Jovan Popzlatanov
- Bogoljub Ranđelović
- Vasko Raspashkovski
- Zhanko Savov
- Stefan Spirovski
- Kire Sterjov
- Boško Stupić
- Goce Todorovski
- Milan Todorovski
- Kristijan Toshevski
- Aco Vasilevski
- Toni Veljanovski
- Dragan Veselinovski

== Players who have scored for both clubs in the derby ==
- Dejan Blazhevski (4 goals, 2 for Pelister and 2 for Vardar)
- Saša Ćirić (2 goals, 1 for Pelister and 1 for Vardar)
- Mile Dimov (2 goals, 1 for Pelister and 1 for Vardar)

== Managers who have worked at both clubs ==
- Boban Babunski
- Ilija Dimoski
- Kiril Dojchinovski
- Perica Gruevski
- Gjoko Hadjievski
- Alekso Mackov
- Gorazd Mihajlov
- Srgjan Zaharievski

== Honours ==
These are the major football honours of Vardar and Pelister.

Competition	Vardar	Pelister
Yugoslav Championship (1947–1992)	0 (1)	0
Macedonian Championship (1992–present)	12	0
Yugoslav Cup (1947–1992)	1	0
Macedonian Cup (1992–present)	6	2
Macedonian Supercup (2011–2015)	2	0
Total	21 (22)	2

== Head-to-head league ranking ==
The table lists the place each team took in each of the seasons.

P.	91	92	93	94	95	96	97	98	99	00	01	02	03	07	08	09	10	11	13	14	15	17	18	21	23	25	26
1st			1	1	1							1	1						1		1	1					1
2nd	2										2												2				
3rd						3									3										3		
4th			4	4			4	4	4	4				4	4		4					4			4		
5th					5	5										5				5						5	
6th	6	6						6						6			6			6				6		6	
7th																											
8th											8																8
9th							9														9						
10th									10	10		10				10			10				10				
11th													11					11						11			
12th																		12									
13th																											
14th																											
15th		15																									

Key

First League
Second League

Vardar
Pelister

Source: rsssf.org
