= 2002–03 FK Vardar season =

Vardar
2002–03 season
- Chairman: Aleksandar Trpevski
- Manager: Gjoko Hadjievski
- Stadium: Gradski stadion Skopje
- First League: 1st
- Macedonian Cup: Quarter-finals
- Champions League: Second qualifying round
- Top goalscorer: League: Rogério Oliveira (15); All: Rogério Oliveira (19)

The 2002–03 season was the 55th season in Vardar’s history and their tenth in the First League. Their 1st place finish in the 2001–02 season meant it was their 10th successive season playing in the First League.

In that season Vardar was won the championship for the second consecutive time.

== Competitions ==
=== Overall ===
| Competition | Started round | Final result | First match | Last match |
|---|---|---|---|---|
| 2002–03 Macedonian First League | – | 1st | 11 August 2002 | 1 June 2003 |
| 2002–03 Macedonian Cup | First round | Quarter-finals | 4 August 2002 | 27 November 2002 |
| 2002–03 UEFA Champions League | 1st qualifying round | 2nd qualifying round | 17 July 2002 | 7 August 2002 |

=== First League ===
==== Classification ====
| Pos | Team | Pld | W | D | L | GF | GA | GD | Pts | Qualification or relegation |
|---|---|---|---|---|---|---|---|---|---|---|
| 1 | Vardar (C) | 33 | 22 | 6 | 5 | 73 | 37 | +36 | 72 | Qualification for the Champions League first qualifying round |
| 2 | Belasica | 33 | 20 | 9 | 4 | 50 | 32 | +18 | 69 | Qualification for the UEFA Cup qualifying round |
| 3 | Pobeda | 33 | 20 | 5 | 8 | 55 | 33 | +22 | 65 | Qualification for the Intertoto Cup first round |
| 4 | Rabotnichki Kometal | 33 | 16 | 6 | 11 | 41 | 35 | +6 | 54 | |
| 5 | Sloga Jugomagnat | 33 | 15 | 6 | 12 | 62 | 50 | +12 | 51 | |

Source: MacedonianFootball.com, RSSSF.org
Rules for classification: 1) Points; 2) Goal difference; 3) Goals scored; 4) Head-to-head points; 5) Head-to-head goal difference; 6) Head-to-head away goals scored (only if two teams); 7) Head-to-head goals scored; 8) Draw; 9) Play-off. (Note: Criteria 2, 3 and 8 is only used if not deciding Champion, teams for UEFA competitions or relegation).
(C) Champions

==== Results summary ====
| Overall | | | | | | | | Home | | | | | | Away | | | | | |
| Pld | W | D | L | GF | GA | GD | Pts | W | D | L | GF | GA | GD | W | D | L | GF | GA | GD |
|---|---|---|---|---|---|---|---|---|---|---|---|---|---|---|---|---|---|---|---|
| 33 | 22 | 6 | 5 | 73 | 37 | +36 | 72 | 13 | 4 | 0 | 47 | 17 | +30 | 9 | 2 | 5 | 26 | 20 | +6 |

Last updated: 1 June 2003.
Source: RSSSF.com

==== Results by round ====
| Round | 1 | 2 | 3 | 4 | 5 | 6 | 7 | 8 | 9 | 10 | 11 | 12 | 13 | 14 | 15 | 16 | 17 | 18 | 19 | 20 | 21 | 22 | 23 | 24 | 25 | 26 | 27 | 28 | 29 | 30 | 31 | 32 | 33 |
|---|---|---|---|---|---|---|---|---|---|---|---|---|---|---|---|---|---|---|---|---|---|---|---|---|---|---|---|---|---|---|---|---|---|
| Ground | H | A | H | A | H | H | A | H | A | H | A | A | H | A | H | A | A | H | A | H | A | H | H | A | H | A | H | A | H | A | H | H | A |
| Result | W | W | W | L | D | W | W | W | W | D | W | L | W | D | D | D | L | W | L | W | W | W | W | W | W | W | W | W | D | W | W | W | L |
| Position | 1 | 1 | 1 | 2 | 1 | 1 | 1 | 1 | 1 | 1 | 1 | 1 | 1 | 1 | 1 | 2 | 2 | 2 | 2 | 2 | 2 | 2 | 2 | 2 | 2 | 1 | 1 | 1 | 1 | 1 | 1 | 1 | 1 |

A = Away; H = Home; W = Win; D = Draw; L = Loss

==== Matches ====
| Round | Date | Venue | Opponent | Score | Vardar Scorers |
|---|---|---|---|---|---|
| 1 | 11 Aug | H | Napredok | 3 – 0 | Zaharievski, Spasovski, Petkov |
| 2 | 17 Aug | A | Pelister | 2 – 1 | Oliveira, Dimov |
| 3 | 25 Aug | H | Tikvesh | 3 – 0 | Oliveira, Nachevski, Dimov |
| 4 | 1 Sep | A | Belasica | 2 – 3 | Oliveira, Spasovski |
| 5 | 11 Sep | H | Cementarnica 55 | 1 – 1 | Gjoshevski |
| 6 | 14 Sep | H | Pobeda | 2 – 0 | Zaharievski, Spasovski |
| 7 | 22 Sep | A | Bregalnica Delchevo | 1 – 0 | Petkov |
| 8 | 29 Sep | H | Sloga Jugomagnat | 2 – 1 | Oliveira, Jovanoski (o.g.) |
| 9 | 5 Oct | A | Kumanovo | 4 – 1 | Nachevski, Ristovski (2), Zaharievski |
| 10 | 20 Oct | H | Sileks | 1 – 1 | Oliveira |
| 11 | 23 Oct | A | Rabotnichki Kometal | 2 – 1 | Georgievski, Ristovski |
| 12 | 27 Oct | A | Napredok | 1 – 3 | Spasovski |
| 13 | 3 Nov | H | Pelister | 3 – 1 | Oliveira, Spasovski, Gjoševski |
| 14 | 10 Nov | A | Tikvesh | 1 – 1 | Spasovski |
| 15 | 16 Nov | H | Belasica | 0 – 0 | |
| 16 | 24 Nov | A | Cementarnica 55 | 1 – 1 | Spasovski |
| 17 | 1 Dec | A | Pobeda | 1 – 3 | B. Nacev (o.g.) |
| 18 | 2 Mar | H | Bregalnica Delčevo | 2 – 1 | Oliveira, Grozdanoski |
| 19 | 9 Mar | A | Sloga Jugomagnat | 1 – 2 | Zaharievski |
| 20 | 16 Mar | H | Kumanovo | 5 – 2 | Oliveira (2), Grozdanoski, Ristovski, Zaharievski |
| 21 | 23 Mar | A | Sileks | 3 – 1 | Janev, Oliveira (2) |
| 22 | 6 Apr | H | Rabotnichki Kometal | 4 – 0 | Spasovski, Zaharievski, Ristovski, Nachevski |
| 23 | 9 Apr | H | Napredok | 3 – 2 | Petkov (2), Oliveira |
| 24 | 13 Apr | A | Pelister | 2 – 0 | Vasoski, Bozhinovski |
| 25 | 20 Apr | H | Cementarnica 55 | 2 – 1 | Petkov, Zaharievski |
| 26 | 26 Apr | A | Bregalnica Delchevo | 1 – 0 | Nachevski |
| 27 | 4 May | H | Kumanovo | 5 – 1 | Grozdanoski, Petkov (2), Nachevski, Georgievski |
| 28 | 11 May | A | Sloga Jugomagnat | 3 – 2 | Vasoski, Zaharievski, Gjoshevski |
| 29 | 14 May | H | Rabotnichki Kometal | 1 – 1 | Petkov |
| 30 | 18 May | A | Sileks | 1 – 0 | Oliveira |
| 31 | 21 May | H | Pobeda | 4 – 3 | Petkov (3), Nachevski |
| 32 | 24 May | H | Tikvesh | 6 – 2 | Oliveira (2), Zaharievski, Petkov, Vasoski, Bozhinov |
| 33 | 1 Jun | A | Belasica | 0 – 1 | |

=== Macedonian Football Cup ===
| Round | Date | Venue | Opponent | Score | Vardar Scorers |
|---|---|---|---|---|---|
| R1 | 4 Aug | A | Malesh | 4 – 0 | Spasovski (2), Oliveira, Zaharievski |
| R2 | 25 Sep | A | Teteks | 0 – 1 | |
| R2 | 30 Oct | H | Teteks | 1 – 0 (4 – 3 p) | Gjoshevski |
| QF | 6 Nov | A | Belasica | 0 – 1 | |
| QF | 27 Nov | H | Belasica | 2 – 1 | Oliveira (2) |

=== Champions League ===
| Round | Date | Venue | Opponent | Score | Vardar Scorers |
|---|---|---|---|---|---|
| QR1 | 17 Jul | A (Luxembourg) | F91 Dudelange (Luxembourg) | 1 – 1 | Georgievski |
| QR1 | 24 Jul | H | F91 Dudelange (Luxembourg) | 3 – 0 | Spasovski (2), Petkov |
| QR2 | 31 Jul | H | Legia Warsaw (Poland) | 1 – 3 | Ristovski |
| QR2 | 7 Aug | A (Poland) | Legia Warsaw (Poland) | 1 – 1 | Oliveira |

Sources: RSSSF.com

== Player seasonal records ==
=== Top scorers ===
| Rank | Name | League | Europe | Cup | Total |
|---|---|---|---|---|---|
| 1 | (Brazil) (North Macedonia) Rogério Oliveira | 15 | 1 | 3 | 19 |
| 2 | (Bulgaria) Mario Petkov | 12 | 1 | – | 13 |
| 3 | (North Macedonia) Dimitar Spasovski | 8 | 2 | 2 | 12 |
| 4 | (North Macedonia) Srgjan Zaharievski | 9 | – | 1 | 10 |
| 5 | (North Macedonia) Dragan Nachevski | 7 | – | – | 7 |
| 6 | (North Macedonia) Dejan Ristovski | 5 | 1 | – | 6 |
| 7 | (North Macedonia) Nikola Gjoshevski | 3 | – | 1 | 4 |
| 8 | (North Macedonia) Vlatko Grozdanoski | 3 | – | – | 3 |
| 8 | (North Macedonia) Aleksandar Vasoski | 3 | – | – | 3 |
| 8 | (North Macedonia) Slavcho Georgievski | 2 | 1 | – | 3 |
| 11 | (North Macedonia) Risto Bozhinov | 1 | – | – | 1 |
| 11 | (North Macedonia) Bobi Bozhinovski | 1 | – | – | 1 |
| 11 | (North Macedonia) Mile Dimov | 1 | – | – | 1 |
| 11 | (North Macedonia) Sasho Janev | 1 | – | – | 1 |
| | Own goals | 2 | – | – | 2 |
| | TOTALS | 73 | 6 | 7 | 86 |

Source: FC Vardar tripod
