= Macedonia national football team results =

North Macedonia national football team results
- 1993–2018 (as Macedonia)
- 2019–present (as North Macedonia)

This page lists all the matches played by the Macedonia national football team prior to 2019 when the country was renamed North Macedonia according to the Prespa agreement.

For games played after 2019, see North Macedonia national football team results.

== Key ==
Key to matches

- Att. = Match attendance
- (H) = Home ground
- (A) = Away ground
- (N) = Neutral ground

Key to record by opponent

- Pld = Games played
- W = Games won
- D = Games drawn
- L = Games lost
- GF = Goals for
- GA = Goals against

== Results ==
Macedonia's score is shown first in each case.

Macedonia national football team results
No.	Date	Venue	Opponents	Score	Competition	Macedonia scorers	Att.	Ref.
1	13 October 1993	Stanko Mlakar Stadium, Kranj (A)	Slovenia	4–1	Friendly	Boshkovski, Panchev, Janevski, Kanatlarovski	3,000	
2	23 March 1994	Gradski stadion, Skopje (H)	Slovenia	2–0	Friendly	Serafimovski, Boshkovski	20,000	
3	14 May 1994	Gradski stadion, Tetovo (H)	Albania	5–1	Friendly	Memedi, V. Micevski (2), Boshkovski, Ma. Stojkovski	5,000	
4	1 June 1994	Gradski stadion, Skopje (H)	Estonia	2–0	Friendly	Boshkovski, Kanatlarovski	10,000	
5	31 August 1994	Gradski stadion, Skopje (H)	Turkey	0–2	Friendly		7,500	
6	7 September 1994	Gradski stadion, Skopje (H)	Denmark	1–1	UEFA Euro 1996 qualifying	Stojkovski	20,000	
7	12 October 1994	Gradski stadion, Skopje (H)	Spain	0–2	UEFA Euro 1996 qualifying		21,000	
8	16 November 1994	Constant Vanden Stock Stadium, Brussels (A)	Belgium	1–1	UEFA Euro 1996 qualifying	Boshkovski	18,934	
9	17 December 1994	Gradski stadion, Skopje (H)	Cyprus	3–0	UEFA Euro 1996 qualifying	B. Gjurovski (3)	7,000	
10	12 April 1995	Stadion Mladost, Strumica (H)	Bulgaria	0–0	Friendly		7,000	
11	26 April 1995	Parken Stadium, Copenhagen (A)	Denmark	0–1	UEFA Euro 1996 qualifying		38,888	
12	10 May 1995	Hrazdan Stadium, Yerevan (A)	Armenia	2–2	UEFA Euro 1996 qualifying	Hristov, Markovski	12,500	
13	7 June 1995	Gradski stadion, Skopje (H)	Belgium	0–5	UEFA Euro 1996 qualifying		532	
14	30 August 1995	BJK İnönü Stadium, Istanbul (A)	Turkey	1–2	Friendly	Karadjov	7,381	
15	6 September 1995	Gradski stadion, Skopje (H)	Armenia	1–2	UEFA Euro 1996 qualifying	Micevski	10,000	
16	11 October 1995	Tsirion Stadium, Limassol (A)	Cyprus	1–1	UEFA Euro 1996 qualifying	B. Jovanovski	4,513	
17	15 November 1995	Estadio Martínez Valero, Elche (A)	Spain	0–3	UEFA Euro 1996 qualifying		34,000	
18	27 March 1996	Stadion Goce Delčev, Prilep (H)	Malta	1–0	Friendly	Ćirić	3,000	
19	24 April 1996	Gradski stadion, Skopje (H)	Liechtenstein	3–0	1998 FIFA World Cup qualification	Miloshevski, Babunski, Zaharievski	11,500	
20	28 May 1996	Vasil Levski National Stadium, Sofia (A)	Bulgaria	0–3	Friendly		980	
21	1 June 1996	Laugardalsvöllur, Reykjavík (A)	Iceland	1–1	1998 FIFA World Cup qualification	Memedi	3,051	
22	9 October 1996	Lansdowne Road, Dublin (A)	Republic of Ireland	0–3	1998 FIFA World Cup qualification		31,671	
23	9 November 1996	Sportpark Eschen-Mauren, Eschen (A)	Liechtenstein	11–1	1998 FIFA World Cup qualification	Glavevski (3), Hristov, Stojkovski (2), T. Micevski (2), Ćirić (2), V. Micevski	2,700	
24	27 November 1996	Ta' Qali National Stadium, Ta' Qali (A)	Malta	2–0	Friendly	V. Micevski, Ćirić	450	
25	14 December 1996	Gradski stadion, Skopje (H)	Romania	0–3	1998 FIFA World Cup qualification		14,000	
26	17 March 1997	Gradski stadion, Skopje (H)	Australia	0–1	Friendly		4,000	
27	2 April 1997	Gradski stadion, Skopje (H)	Republic of Ireland	3–2	1998 FIFA World Cup qualification	Stojkovski (2), Hristov	11,000	
28	7 June 1997	Gradski stadion, Skopje (H)	Iceland	1–0	1998 FIFA World Cup qualification	Hristov	10,000	
29	20 August 1997	Stadionul Steaua, Bucharest (A)	Romania	2–4	1998 FIFA World Cup qualification	Gjokić (2)	12,000	
30	6 September 1997	Žalgiris Stadium, Vilnius (A)	Lithuania	0–2	1998 FIFA World Cup qualification		6,000	
31	11 October 1997	Gradski stadion, Skopje (H)	Lithuania	1–2	1998 FIFA World Cup qualification	Shakiri	4,000	
32	25 March 1998	Gradski stadion, Skopje (H)	Bulgaria	1–0	Friendly	Hristov	8,000	
33	18 April 1998	Gradski stadion, Skopje (H)	South Korea	2–2	Friendly	Hristov, Gjuzelov	8,000	
34	20 April 1998	Azadi Stadium, Tehran (N)	Jamaica	2–1	1998 LG Cup	Hristov (2)	60,000	
35	22 April 1998	Azadi Stadium, Tehran (N)	Hungary	0–0 (a.e.t.) (2–4p)	1998 LG Cup		20,000	
36	17 May 1998	Spartan Stadium, San Jose (A)	United States	0–0	Friendly		23,861	
37	18 May 1998	Exhibition Stadium, Toronto (A)	Canada	0–1	Friendly		8,491	
38	3 June 1998	Gradski stadion, Skopje (H)	Bosnia and Herzegovina	1–1	Friendly	Stojanoski	3,500	
39	6 September 1998	Gradski stadion, Skopje (H)	Malta	4–0	UEFA Euro 2000 qualifying	Bozhinov (2), Shakiri (2)	4,000	
40	29 September 1998	Gradski stadion, Kumanovo (H)	Egypt	2–2	Friendly	Zaharievski, Shainovski	5,500	
41	14 October 1998	Stadion Maksimir, Zagreb (A)	Croatia	2–3	UEFA Euro 2000 qualifying	Ćirić, Shainovski	8,541	
42	18 November 1998	Ta' Qali National Stadium, Ta' Qali (A)	Malta	2–1	UEFA Euro 2000 qualifying	Nikolovski, Zaharievski	1,295	
43	10 February 1999	Qemal Stafa Stadium, Tirana (A)	Albania	0–2	Friendly		6,000	
44	5 June 1999	Gradski stadion, Skopje (H)	Croatia	1–1	UEFA Euro 2000 qualifying	Hristov	10,000	
45	9 June 1999	Lansdowne Road, Dublin (A)	Republic of Ireland	0–1	UEFA Euro 2000 qualifying		28,108	
46	5 September 1999	Partizan Stadium, Belgrade (A)	FR Yugoslavia	1–3	UEFA Euro 2000 qualifying	Ćirić	20,320	
47	8 September 1999	Gradski stadion, Skopje (H)	FR Yugoslavia	2–4	UEFA Euro 2000 qualifying	Shakiri, Ćirić	13,000	
48	9 October 1999	Gradski stadion, Skopje (H)	Republic of Ireland	1–1	UEFA Euro 2000 qualifying	Stavrevski	6,500	
49	23 February 2000	Gradski stadion, Skopje (H)	FR Yugoslavia	1–2	Friendly	Karanfilovski	8,000	
50	29 March 2000	Bilino Polje, Zenica (A)	Bosnia and Herzegovina	0–1	Friendly		17,000	
51	26 April 2000	Stadion Goce Delčev, Prilep (H)	Albania	1–0	Friendly	Serafimovski	3,000	
52	7 June 2000	Azadi Stadium, Tehran (N)	South Korea	1–2	2000 LG Cup	Shakiri	30,000	
53	9 June 2000	Azadi Stadium, Tehran (N)	Iran	1–3	2000 LG Cup	Hristov	40,000	
54	27 July 2000	Ticha Stadium, Varna (N)	Azerbaijan	2–1	San Pellegrino Tournament	Nuhiji (2)	2,000	
55	3 September 2000	Tehelné pole, Bratislava (A)	Slovakia	0–2	2002 FIFA World Cup qualification		4,011	
56	6 October 2000	Gradski stadion, Skopje (H)	Azerbaijan	3–0	2002 FIFA World Cup qualification	Hristov (2), Beqiri	3,500	
57	11 October 2000	Stadionul Republican, Chişinău (A)	Moldova	0–0	2002 FIFA World Cup qualification		3,000	
58	28 February 2001	Gradski stadion, Skopje (H)	Czech Republic	1–1	Friendly	Hristov	8,200	
59	24 March 2001	Ullevi, Gothenburg (A)	Sweden	0–1	2002 FIFA World Cup qualification		22,106	
60	28 March 2001	Gradski stadion, Skopje (H)	Turkey	1–2	2002 FIFA World Cup qualification	Micevski	8,000	
61	2 June 2001	Gradski stadion, Skopje (H)	Moldova	2–2	2002 FIFA World Cup qualification	Shakiri, Krstev	3,000	
62	6 June 2001	Bursa Atatürk Stadium, Bursa (A)	Turkey	3–3	2002 FIFA World Cup qualification	Shakiri, Serafimovski, Nikolovski	18,000	
63	24 July 2001	Stade Jean-Bouin, Évreux (N)	Qatar	0–1	Friendly		2,000	
64	1 August 2001	King Fahd International Stadium, Riyadh (A)	Saudi Arabia	1–1	Friendly	Maznov	8,000	
65	15 August 2001	Balgarska Armia Stadium, Sofia (A)	Bulgaria	0–1	Friendly		1,000	
66	1 September 2001	Gradski stadion, Skopje (H)	Sweden	1–2	2002 FIFA World Cup qualification	Nachevski	8,000	
67	5 September 2001	Tofiq Bahramov Stadium, Baku (A)	Azerbaijan	1–1	2002 FIFA World Cup qualification	Trajanov	4,100	
68	7 October 2001	Gradski stadion, Skopje (H)	Slovakia	0–5	2002 FIFA World Cup qualification		4,500	
69	14 November 2001	Megyeri úti Stadium, Budapest (A)	Hungary	0–5	Friendly		12,000	
70	30 December 2001	Sultan Qaboos Sports Complex, Muscat (A)	Oman	0–2	Friendly		4,000	
71	5 January 2002	Bahrain National Stadium, Manama (N)	Albania	0–0	Bahrain Shoot Soccer Tournament		2,000	
72	7 January 2002	Bahrain National Stadium, Manama (N)	Bahrain	1–1	Bahrain Shoot Soccer Tournament	Siljanoski	4,000	
73	10 January 2002	Bahrain National Stadium, Manama (N)	Finland	0–3	Bahrain Shoot Soccer Tournament		3,000	
74	27 March 2002	Stadion Grbavica, Sarajevo (A)	Bosnia and Herzegovina	4–4	Friendly	Shakiri (3), Ćirić	3,500	
75	17 April 2002	Stadion Goce Delčev, Prilep (H)	Finland	1–0	Friendly	Stavrevski	5,000	
76	21 August 2002	Gradski stadion, Skopje (H)	Malta	5–0	Friendly	Stojkov, Shakiri (2), Hristov, Pandev	7,000	
77	8 September 2002	Rheinpark Stadion, Vaduz (A)	Liechtenstein	1–1	UEFA Euro 2004 qualifying	Hristov	2,650	
78	12 October 2002	Gradski stadion, Skopje (H)	Turkey	1–2	UEFA Euro 2004 qualifying	Grozdanoski	9,000	
79	16 October 2002	St. Mary's Stadium, Southampton (A)	England	2–2	UEFA Euro 2004 qualifying	Shakiri, Trajanov	32,095	
80	20 November 2002	Gradski stadion, Skopje (H)	Israel	2–3	Friendly	Vasoski, Sedloski	7,000	
81	9 February 2003	Stadion Šubićevac, Šibenik (A)	Croatia	2–2	Friendly	Sedloski, Toleski	3,000	
82	14 February 2003	Stadion Poljud, Split (N)	Poland	0–3	Marjan Trophy		30	
83	29 March 2003	Gradski stadion, Skopje (H)	Slovakia	0–2	UEFA Euro 2004 qualifying		7,000	
84	2 April 2003	Stade Olympique de la Pontaise, Lausanne (N)	Portugal	0–1	Friendly		14,258	
85	7 June 2003	Gradski stadion, Skopje (H)	Liechtenstein	3–1	UEFA Euro 2004 qualifying	Sedloski, Krstev, Stojkov	2,500	
86	11 June 2003	BJK İnönü Stadium, Istanbul (A)	Turkey	2–3	UEFA Euro 2004 qualifying	Grozdanoski, Shakiri	20,900	
87	20 August 2003	Stadion Goce Delčev, Prilep (H)	Albania	3–1	Friendly	Naumoski, Pandev, Dimitrovski	8,000	
88	6 September 2003	Gradski stadion, Skopje (H)	England	1–2	UEFA Euro 2004 qualifying	Hristov	15,000	
89	10 September 2003	Štadión pod Dubňom, Žilina (A)	Slovakia	1–1	UEFA Euro 2004 qualifying	Dimitrovski	2,500	
90	11 October 2003	Valeriy Lobanovskyi Dynamo Stadium, Kyiv (A)	Ukraine	0–0	Friendly		13,000	
91	27 January 2004	Meihu Sports Centre, Yiwu (A)	China	0–0	Friendly		24,000	
92	29 January 2004	Suzhou Sports Center, Suzhou (A)	China	0–1	Friendly		17,500	
93	18 February 2004	Gradski stadion, Skopje (H)	Bosnia and Herzegovina	1–0	Friendly	Pandev	8,000	
94	31 March 2004	Gradski stadion, Skopje (H)	Ukraine	1–0	Friendly	Stavrevski	16,000	
95	28 April 2004	Gradski stadion, Skopje (H)	Croatia	0–1	Friendly		15,000	
96	11 June 2004	Lilleküla Stadium, Tallinn (A)	Estonia	4–2	Friendly	Sedloski, Popov, Pandev, Grozdanoski	1,500	
97	18 August 2004	Gradski stadion, Skopje (H)	Armenia	3–0	2006 FIFA World Cup qualification	Pandev, Shakiri, Šumulikoski	4,375	
98	4 September 2004	Stadionul Ion Oblemenco, Craiova (A)	Romania	1–2	2006 FIFA World Cup qualification	Vasoski	14,500	
99	9 October 2004	Gradski stadion, Skopje (H)	Netherlands	2–2	2006 FIFA World Cup qualification	Pandev, Stojkov	15,000	
100	13 October 2004	Estadi Comunal d'Aixovall, Aixovall (A)	Andorra	0–1	2006 FIFA World Cup qualification		350	
101	17 November 2004	Gradski stadion, Skopje (H)	Czech Republic	0–2	2006 FIFA World Cup qualification		7,000	
102	9 February 2005	Gradski stadion, Skopje (H)	Andorra	0–0	2006 FIFA World Cup qualification		5,000	
103	30 March 2005	Gradski stadion, Skopje (H)	Romania	1–2	2006 FIFA World Cup qualification	Maznov	15,000	
104	4 June 2005	Vazgen Sargsyan Republican Stadium, Yerevan (A)	Armenia	2–1	2006 FIFA World Cup qualification	Pandev (2)	2,870	
105	8 June 2005	Na Stínadlech, Teplice (A)	Czech Republic	1–6	2006 FIFA World Cup qualification	Pandev	14,150	
106	17 August 2005	Gradski stadion, Skopje (H)	Finland	0–3	2006 FIFA World Cup qualification		6,800	
107	7 September 2005	Ratina Stadion, Tampere (A)	Finland	1–5	2006 FIFA World Cup qualification	Maznov	6,467	
108	12 October 2005	Amsterdam Arena, Amsterdam (A)	Netherlands	0–0	2006 FIFA World Cup qualification		50,000	
109	12 November 2005	Rheinpark Stadion, Vaduz (A)	Liechtenstein	2–1	Friendly	Baldovaliev, Ilijoski	1,350	
110	1 March 2006	Gradski stadion, Skopje (H)	Bulgaria	0–1	Friendly		8,000	
111	28 May 2006	Estadio Teresa Rivero, Madrid (N)	Ecuador	2–1	Friendly	Maznov, Mitreski	4,000	
112	4 June 2006	Grotenburg-Stadion, Krefeld (N)	Turkey	1–0	Friendly	Maznov	7,000	
113	16 August 2006	Lilleküla Stadium, Tallinn (A)	Estonia	1–0	UEFA Euro 2008 qualifying	Sedloski	7,500	
114	6 September 2006	Gradski stadion, Skopje (H)	England	0–1	UEFA Euro 2008 qualifying		16,500	
115	7 October 2006	Old Trafford, Manchester (A)	England	0–0	UEFA Euro 2008 qualifying		72,062	
116	11 October 2006	Estadi Comunal d'Aixovall, Aixovall (A)	Andorra	3–0	UEFA Euro 2008 qualifying	Pandev, Noveski, Naumoski	300	
117	15 November 2006	Gradski stadion, Skopje (H)	Russia	0–2	UEFA Euro 2008 qualifying		16,000	
118	7 February 2007	Loro Boriçi Stadium, Shkodër (A)	Albania	1–0	Friendly	Ristić	7,000	
119	24 March 2007	Stadion Maksimir, Zagreb (A)	Croatia	1–2	UEFA Euro 2008 qualifying	Sedloski	20,000	
120	2 June 2007	Gradski stadion, Skopje (H)	Israel	1–2	UEFA Euro 2008 qualifying	Stojkov	12,000	
121	22 August 2007	Gradski stadion, Skopje (H)	Nigeria	0–0	Friendly		5,000	
122	8 September 2007	Lokomotiv Stadium, Moscow (A)	Russia	0–3	UEFA Euro 2008 qualifying		26,000	
123	12 September 2007	Gradski stadion, Skopje (H)	Estonia	1–1	UEFA Euro 2008 qualifying	Maznov	5,000	
124	17 October 2007	Gradski stadion, Skopje (H)	Andorra	3–0	UEFA Euro 2008 qualifying	Naumoski, Sedloski, Pandev	20,000	
125	17 November 2007	Gradski stadion, Skopje (H)	Croatia	2–0	UEFA Euro 2008 qualifying	Maznov, Naumoski	18,000	
126	21 November 2007	Ramat Gan Stadium, Ramat Gan (A)	Israel	0–1	UEFA Euro 2008 qualifying		2,736	
127	6 February 2008	Gradski stadion, Skopje (H)	Serbia	1–1	Friendly	Noveski	10,000	
128	26 March 2008	Bilino Polje, Zenica (A)	Bosnia and Herzegovina	2–2	Friendly	Maznov (2)	10,000	
129	26 May 2008	Stadion an der Kreuzeiche, Reutlingen (N)	Poland	1–1	Friendly	Maznov	2,200	
130	20 August 2008	Stade Josy Barthel, Luxembourg City (A)	Luxembourg	4–1	Friendly	Pandev (2), Grozdanoski, Naumoski	885	
131	6 September 2008	Gradski stadion, Skopje (H)	Scotland	1–0	2010 FIFA World Cup qualification	Naumoski	9,000	
132	10 September 2008	Gradski stadion, Skopje (H)	Netherlands	1–2	2010 FIFA World Cup qualification	Pandev	11,000	
133	15 October 2008	Laugardalsvöllur, Reykjavík (A)	Iceland	0–1	2010 FIFA World Cup qualification		5,527	
134	19 November 2008	Podgorica City Stadium, Podgorica (A)	Montenegro	1–2	Friendly	Popov	5,000	
135	11 February 2009	Mardan Sports Complex, Antalya (N)	Moldova	1–1	Friendly	Pandev	500	
136	1 April 2009	Amsterdam Arena, Amsterdam (A)	Netherlands	0–4	2010 FIFA World Cup qualification		47,750	
137	6 June 2009	Philip II Arena, Skopje (H)	Norway	0–0	2010 FIFA World Cup qualification		9,000	
138	10 June 2009	Philip II Arena, Skopje (H)	Iceland	2–0	2010 FIFA World Cup qualification	Stojkov, Ivanovski	7,000	
139	12 August 2009	Philip II Arena, Skopje (H)	Spain	2–3	Friendly	Pandev (2)	25,000	
140	5 September 2009	Hampden Park, Glasgow (A)	Scotland	0–2	2010 FIFA World Cup qualification		50,214	
141	9 September 2009	Ullevaal Stadion, Oslo (A)	Norway	1–2	2010 FIFA World Cup qualification	Grncharov	14,766	
142	11 October 2009	Philip II Arena, Skopje (H)	Qatar	2–1	Friendly	Pandev (2)	5,000	
143	14 November 2009	Stadion Mladost, Strumica (H)	Canada	3–0	Friendly	Sedloski, Pandev (2)	3,500	
144	18 November 2009	Azadi Stadium, Tehran (A)	Iran	1–1	Friendly	Pandev	3,000	
145	3 March 2010	Philip II Arena, Skopje (H)	Montenegro	2–1	Friendly	Naumoski, Pandev	7,000	
146	29 May 2010	Sportplatz, Bischofshofen (N)	Azerbaijan	3–1	Friendly	Trichkovski, Sadygov (o.g.), M. Gjurovski	500	
147	2 June 2010	Stadion Lind, Villach (N)	Romania	1–0	Friendly	Shikov	1,000	
148	11 August 2010	Ta' Qali National Stadium, Ta' Qali (A)	Malta	1–1	Friendly	Trichkovski	2,500	
149	3 September 2010	Štadión Pasienky, Bratislava (A)	Slovakia	0–1	UEFA Euro 2012 qualifying		5,980	
150	7 September 2010	Philip II Arena, Skopje (H)	Armenia	2–2	UEFA Euro 2012 qualifying	M. Gjurovski, Naumoski	9,000	
151	8 October 2010	Estadi Comunal d'Aixovall, Aixovall (A)	Andorra	2–0	UEFA Euro 2012 qualifying	Naumoski, Shikov	550	
152	12 October 2010	Philip II Arena, Skopje (H)	Russia	0–1	UEFA Euro 2012 qualifying		17,000	
153	17 November 2010	Skënderbeu Stadium, Korçë (A)	Albania	0–0	Friendly		6,000	
154	22 December 2010	Yuexiushan Stadium, Guangzhou (A)	China	0–1	Friendly		5,500	
155	9 February 2011	Philip II Arena, Skopje (H)	Cameroon	0–1	Friendly		3,000	
156	26 March 2011	Aviva Stadium, Dublin (A)	Republic of Ireland	1–2	UEFA Euro 2012 qualifying	Trichkovski	33,200	
157	4 June 2011	Philip II Arena, Skopje (H)	Republic of Ireland	0–2	UEFA Euro 2012 qualifying		29,500	
158	10 August 2011	Dalga Arena, Baku (A)	Azerbaijan	1–0	Friendly	Pandev	1,000	
159	2 September 2011	Luzhniki Stadium, Moscow (A)	Russia	0–1	UEFA Euro 2012 qualifying		31,028	
160	6 September 2011	Philip II Arena, Skopje (H)	Andorra	1–0	UEFA Euro 2012 qualifying	Ivanovski	5,000	
161	7 October 2011	Vazgen Sargsyan Republican Stadium, Yerevan (A)	Armenia	1–4	UEFA Euro 2012 qualifying	Shikov	14,403	
162	11 October 2011	Philip II Arena, Skopje (H)	Slovakia	1–1	UEFA Euro 2012 qualifying	Noveski	4,100	
163	15 November 2011	Stadion Goce Delčev, Prilep (H)	Albania	0–0	Friendly		3,500	
164	29 February 2012	Stade Josy Barthel, Luxembourg City (A)	Luxembourg	1–2	Friendly	Hasani	787	
165	26 May 2012	Estádio Dr. Magalhães Pessoa, Leiria (A)	Portugal	0–0	Friendly		19,323	
166	29 May 2012	Estádio António Coimbra da Mota, Estoril (N)	Angola	0–0	Friendly		200	
167	15 August 2012	Philip II Arena, Skopje (H)	Lithuania	1–0	Friendly	Pandev	7,000	
168	7 September 2012	Stadion Maksimir, Zagreb (A)	Croatia	0–1	2014 FIFA World Cup qualification		13,883	
169	11 September 2012	Hampden Park, Glasgow (A)	Scotland	1–1	2014 FIFA World Cup qualification	Noveski	32,430	
170	12 October 2012	Philip II Arena, Skopje (H)	Croatia	1–2	2014 FIFA World Cup qualification	Ibraimi	25,230	
171	16 October 2012	Philip II Arena, Skopje (H)	Serbia	1–0	2014 FIFA World Cup qualification	Ibraimi	26,181	
172	14 November 2012	Philip II Arena, Skopje (H)	Slovenia	3–2	Friendly	Tasevski, Jahović, Ibraimi	3,000	
173	14 December 2012	Mardan Sports Complex, Antalya (N)	Poland	1–4	Friendly	Blazhevski	100	
174	6 February 2013	Philip II Arena, Skopje (H)	Denmark	3–0	Friendly	Pandev, Ibraimi, Noveski	5,000	
175	22 March 2013	Philip II Arena, Skopje (H)	Belgium	0–2	2014 FIFA World Cup qualification		15,947	
176	26 March 2013	King Baudouin Stadium, Brussels (A)	Belgium	0–1	2014 FIFA World Cup qualification		45,000	
177	3 June 2013	Stadion, Malmö (A)	Sweden	0–1	Friendly		14,459	
178	11 June 2013	Ullevaal Stadion, Oslo (A)	Norway	0–2	Friendly		8,756	
179	14 August 2013	Philip II Arena, Skopje (H)	Bulgaria	2–0	Friendly	Ibraimi, Trajkovski	4,000	
180	6 September 2013	Philip II Arena, Skopje (H)	Wales	2–1	2014 FIFA World Cup qualification	Trichkovski, Trajkovski	10,000	
181	10 September 2013	Philip II Arena, Skopje (H)	Scotland	1–2	2014 FIFA World Cup qualification	Kostovski	15,000	
182	11 October 2013	Cardiff City Stadium, Cardiff (A)	Wales	0–1	2014 FIFA World Cup qualification		11,257	
183	15 October 2013	Stadion Jagodina, Jagodina (A)	Serbia	1–5	2014 FIFA World Cup qualification	Jahović	8,294	
184	5 March 2014	Philip II Arena, Skopje (H)	Latvia	2–1	Friendly	Kostovski, A. Ibraimi	4,000	
185	26 May 2014	Kufstein Arena, Kufstein (N)	Cameroon	0–2	Friendly		1,500	
186	30 May 2014	Stadio Centro d'Italia, Rieti (N)	Qatar	0–0	Friendly		200	
187	18 June 2014	Shenyang Olympic Sports Center Stadium, Shenyang (A)	China	0–2	Friendly		15,265	
188	22 June 2014	Jinan Olympic Sports Center Stadium, Jinan (A)	China	0–0	Friendly		5,000	
189	8 September 2014	Estadi Ciutat de València, Valencia (A)	Spain	1–5	UEFA Euro 2016 qualifying	Ibraimi	22,000	
190	9 October 2014	Philip II Arena, Skopje (H)	Luxembourg	3–2	UEFA Euro 2016 qualifying	Trajkovski, Jahović, Abdurahimi	11,500	
191	12 October 2014	Arena Lviv, Lviv (A)	Ukraine	0–1	UEFA Euro 2016 qualifying		33,900	
192	15 November 2014	Philip II Arena, Skopje (H)	Slovakia	0–2	UEFA Euro 2016 qualifying		6,000	
193	27 March 2015	Philip II Arena, Skopje (H)	Belarus	1–2	UEFA Euro 2016 qualifying	Trajkovski	3,447	
194	30 March 2015	Philip II Arena, Skopje (H)	Australia	0–0	Friendly		2,000	
195	14 June 2015	Štadión pod Dubňom, Žilina (A)	Slovakia	1–2	UEFA Euro 2016 qualifying	Ademi	10,765	
196	5 September 2015	Stade Josy Barthel, Luxembourg City (A)	Luxembourg	0–1	UEFA Euro 2016 qualifying		1,657	
197	8 September 2015	Philip II Arena, Skopje (H)	Spain	0–1	UEFA Euro 2016 qualifying		31,657	
198	9 October 2015	Philip II Arena, Skopje (H)	Ukraine	0–2	UEFA Euro 2016 qualifying		1,250	
199	12 October 2015	Borisov Arena, Barysaw (A)	Belarus	0–0	UEFA Euro 2016 qualifying		1,545	
200	12 November 2015	Philip II Arena, Skopje (H)	Montenegro	4–1	Friendly	Shikov, Trajkovski (3)	500	
201	17 November 2015	Philip II Arena, Skopje (H)	Lebanon	0–1	Friendly		500	
202	23 March 2016	Bonifika Stadium, Koper (A)	Slovenia	0–1	Friendly		3,000	
203	29 March 2016	Philip II Arena, Skopje (H)	Bulgaria	0–2	Friendly		1,000	
204	29 May 2016	Sportplatz Bad Erlach, Bad Erlach (N)	Azerbaijan	3–1	Friendly	Radeski, Pandev, Nestorovski	200	
205	2 June 2016	Philip II Arena, Skopje (H)	Iran	1–3	Friendly	Trajkovski	2,000	
206	5 September 2016 (Note: Match suspended after 76 minutes due to adverse weather conditions, with the score at 1–1, and resumed the following day.)	Loro Boriçi Stadium, Shkodër (A)	Albania	1–2	2018 FIFA World Cup qualification	Alioski	14,667	
207	6 October 2016	Philip II Arena, Skopje (H)	Israel	1–2	2018 FIFA World Cup qualification	Nestorovski	6,500	
208	9 October 2016	Philip II Arena, Skopje (H)	Italy	2–3	2018 FIFA World Cup qualification	Nestorovski, Hasani	27,000	
209	12 November 2016	Estadio Nuevo Los Cármenes, Granada (A)	Spain	0–4	2018 FIFA World Cup qualification		16,622	
210	24 March 2017	Rheinpark Stadion, Vaduz (A)	Liechtenstein	3–0	2018 FIFA World Cup qualification	Nikolov, Nestorovski (2)	4,517	
211	28 March 2017	Philip II Arena, Skopje (H)	Belarus	3–0	Friendly	Spirovski, Pandev (2)	3,000	
212	5 June 2017	Philip II Arena, Skopje (H)	Turkey	0–0	Friendly		6,000	
213	11 June 2017	Philip II Arena, Skopje (H)	Spain	1–2	2018 FIFA World Cup qualification	Ristovski	20,675	
214	2 September 2017	Sammy Ofer Stadium, Haifa (A)	Israel	1–0	2018 FIFA World Cup qualification	Pandev	11,350	
215	5 September 2017	Stadion Mladost, Strumica (H)	Albania	1–1	2018 FIFA World Cup qualification	Trajkovski	3,493	
216	6 October 2017	Stadio Olimpico Grande Torino, Turin (A)	Italy	1–1	2018 FIFA World Cup qualification	Trajkovski	22,603	
217	9 October 2017	Stadion Mladost, Strumica (H)	Liechtenstein	4–0	2018 FIFA World Cup qualification	Musliu, Trajkovski, Bardhi, Ademi	4,518	
218	11 November 2017	Philip II Arena, Skopje (H)	Norway	2–0	Friendly	Pandev, Markoski	3,000	
219	23 March 2018	Gloria Sports Arena, Antalya (N)	Finland	0–0	Friendly		1,000	
220	27 March 2018	Mardan Sports Complex, Antalya (N)	Azerbaijan	1–1	Friendly	Trajkovski	100	
221	6 September 2018	Victoria Stadium, Gibraltar (A)	Gibraltar	2–0	2018–19 UEFA Nations League	Trichkovski, Alioski	1,850	
222	9 September 2018	Philip II Arena, Skopje (H)	Armenia	2–0	2018–19 UEFA Nations League	Alioski, Pandev	4,730	
223	13 October 2018	Philip II Arena, Skopje (H)	Liechtenstein	4–1	2018–19 UEFA Nations League	Trajkovski (2), Pandev, Alioski	8,100	
224	16 October 2018	Vazgen Sargsyan Republican Stadium, Yerevan (A)	Armenia	0–4	2018–19 UEFA Nations League		8,300	
225	16 November 2018	Rheinpark Stadion, Vaduz (A)	Liechtenstein	2–0	2018–19 UEFA Nations League	Bardhi, Nestorovski	2,116	
226	19 November 2018	Philip II Arena, Skopje (H)	Gibraltar	4–0	2018–19 UEFA Nations League	Bardhi, Nestorovski (2), Trajkovski	2,152	

== Record by opponent ==
Team	Pld	W	D	L	GF	GA	GD	WPCT
Albania	10	4	4	2	12	7	+5	40.00
Andorra	6	4	1	1	9	1	+8	66.67
Angola	1	0	1	0	0	0	0	0.00
Armenia	8	3	2	3	13	15	−2	37.50
Australia	2	0	1	1	0	1	−1	0.00
Azerbaijan	7	5	2	0	14	5	+9	71.43
Bahrain	1	0	1	0	1	1	0	0.00
Belarus	3	1	1	1	4	2	+2	33.33
Belgium	4	0	1	3	1	9	−8	0.00
Bosnia and Herzegovina	5	1	3	1	8	8	0	20.00
Bulgaria	7	2	1	4	3	7	−4	28.57
Cameroon	2	0	0	2	0	3	−3	0.00
Canada	2	1	0	1	3	1	+2	50.00
China	5	0	2	3	0	4	−4	0.00
Croatia	8	1	2	5	9	12	−3	12.50
Cyprus	2	1	1	0	4	1	+3	50.00
Czech Republic	3	0	1	2	2	9	−7	0.00
Denmark	3	1	1	1	4	2	+2	33.33
Ecuador	1	1	0	0	2	1	+1	100.00
Egypt	1	0	1	0	2	2	0	0.00
England	4	0	2	2	3	5	−2	0.00
Estonia	4	3	1	0	8	3	+5	75.00
Finland	5	1	1	3	2	11	−9	20.00
FR Yugoslavia	3	0	0	3	4	9	−5	0.00
Gibraltar	2	2	0	0	6	0	+6	100.00
Hungary	2	0	1	1	0	5	−5	0.00
Iceland	4	2	1	1	4	2	+2	50.00
Iran	3	0	1	2	3	7	−4	0.00
Israel	5	1	0	4	5	8	−3	20.00
Italy	2	0	1	1	3	4	−1	0.00
Jamaica	1	1	0	0	2	1	+1	100.00
Latvia	1	1	0	0	2	1	+1	100.00
Lebanon	1	0	0	1	0	1	−1	0.00
Liechtenstein	9	8	1	0	33	5	+28	88.89
Lithuania	3	1	0	2	2	4	−2	33.33
Luxembourg	4	2	0	2	8	6	+2	50.00
Malta	6	5	1	0	15	2	+13	83.33
Moldova	3	0	3	0	3	3	0	0.00
Montenegro	3	2	0	1	7	4	+3	66.67
Netherlands	4	0	2	2	3	8	−5	0.00
Nigeria	1	0	1	0	0	0	0	0.00
Norway	4	1	1	2	3	4	−1	25.00
Oman	1	0	0	1	0	2	−2	0.00
Poland	3	0	1	2	2	8	−6	0.00
Portugal	2	0	1	1	0	1	−1	0.00
Qatar	3	1	1	1	2	2	0	33.33
Republic of Ireland	6	1	1	4	5	11	−6	16.67
Romania	5	1	0	4	5	11	−6	20.00
Russia	4	0	0	4	0	7	−7	0.00
Saudi Arabia	1	0	1	0	1	1	0	0.00
Scotland	4	1	1	2	3	5	−2	25.00
Serbia	3	1	1	1	3	6	−3	33.33
Slovakia	8	0	2	6	3	16	−13	0.00
Slovenia	4	3	0	1	9	4	+5	75.00
South Korea	2	0	1	1	3	4	−1	0.00
Spain	7	0	0	7	4	20	−16	0.00
Sweden	3	0	0	3	1	4	−3	0.00
Turkey	8	1	2	5	9	14	−5	12.50
Ukraine	4	1	1	2	1	3	−2	25.00
United States	1	0	1	0	0	0	0	0.00
Wales	2	1	0	1	2	2	0	50.00
Total	226	66	57	103	260	305	−45	29.20

Source: Results
