= 1992–93 Macedonian Football Cup =

Tournament details
- Country: Macedonia

Final positions
- Champions: Vardar (1st title)
- Runners-up: Pelister

The 1992–93 Macedonian Football Cup was the first and inaugural season of Macedonia's football knockout competition, since the Macedonia independence from Yugoslavia. The 1992–93 champions were FK Vardar who won their first title.

== Semi-finals ==
Team 1	Agg.	Team 2	1st leg	2nd leg
Pobeda (1)	0–4	Vardar (1)	0–1	0–3
Pelister (1)	4–1	Metalurg (1)	1–1	3–0

== Final ==
23 May 1993
20:00 CEST

Vardar (1)	1–0	Pelister (1)
Savov 86'	Report

Gradski stadion, Skopje
Attendance: 20,000
Referee: Goce Popev (Skopje)

Vardar	Pelister

VARDAR:
1	(North Macedonia) Antonio Filevski (GK)
2	(North Macedonia) Zoran Jovanovski	(yellow card) 72'
3	(North Macedonia) Mirko Spaseski	(substituted off) 46'
4	(North Macedonia) Gajur Sadiki
5	(North Macedonia) Vlatko Kostov
6	(North Macedonia) Ljupcho Markovski (C)
7	(North Macedonia) Ljupcho Naumovski	(substituted off) 89'
8	(North Macedonia) Sashko Todorovski
9	(North Macedonia) Zhanko Savov
10	(North Macedonia) Saša Ćirić
11	(North Macedonia) Sasho Miloshevski
Substitutes:
12	(North Macedonia) Muarem Zekir (GK)
13	(North Macedonia) Viktor Eftimov	(substituted on) 46'
14	(North Macedonia) Toni Angelov	(substituted on) 89'
15	(North Macedonia) Mario Vujović
16	(North Macedonia) Marjan Gerasimovski
Manager:
(North Macedonia) Gjoko Hadjievski

PELISTER:
1	(North Macedonia) Petar Miloshevski (GK)
2	(North Macedonia) Kire Grozdanov
3	(North Macedonia) Ace Vasilevski
4	(North Macedonia) Dragi Kanatlarovski (C)	(yellow card) 70'
5	(North Macedonia) Dimche Dimov
6	(North Macedonia) Zlatko Cvetanovski	(yellow card) 5'
7	(North Macedonia) Bruno Presilski		(substituted off) 87'
8	(North Macedonia) Toni Micevski
9	(North Macedonia) Vancho Micevski
10	(North Macedonia) Rade Karanfilovski		(substituted off) 87'
11	(North Macedonia) Goran Stavrevski
Substitutes:
12	(North Macedonia) Miki Jonoski (GK)
13	(North Macedonia) Slavcho Markovski		(substituted on) 87'
14	(North Macedonia) Dimitar Kapinkovski
15	(North Macedonia) Kire Sterjov		(substituted on) 87'
16	(North Macedonia) Georgi Hristov
Manager:
(North Macedonia) Zoran Smileski

MATCH OFFICIALS

- Assistant referees:
  - Vancho Kocev (Shtip)
  - Branko Manojlovski (Skopje)

MATCH RULES

- 90 minutes.
- 30 minutes of extra-time if necessary.
- Penalty shoot-out if scores still level.
- Five named substitutes.
- Maximum of two substitutions.

== See also ==
- 1992–93 Macedonian First Football League
- 1992–93 Macedonian Second Football League
