= UEFA Euro 2000 qualifying Group 8 =

Football tournament qualifying stage

Standings and results for Group 8 of the UEFA Euro 2000 qualifying tournament.

== Standings ==
Pos	Team	Pld	W	D	L	GF	GA	GD	Pts	Qualification	(Federal Republic of Yugoslavia)	(Republic of Ireland)	(Croatia)	(North Macedonia)	(Malta)
1	FR Yugoslavia	8	5	2	1	18	8	+10	17	Qualify for final tournament	—	1–0	0–0	3–1	4–1
2	Republic of Ireland	8	5	1	2	14	6	+8	16	Advance to play-offs	2–1	—	2–0	1–0	5–0
3	Croatia	8	4	3	1	13	9	+4	15		2–2	1–0	—	3–2	2–1
4	Macedonia	8	2	2	4	13	14	−1	8		2–4	1–1	1–1	—	4–0
5	Malta	8	0	0	8	6	27	−21	0		0–3	2–3	1–4	1–2	—

Source: UEFA
Rules for classification: Qualification tiebreakers

== Matches ==
5 September 1998
15:00 UTC+1

Republic of Ireland	2–0	Croatia
Irwin 5' (pen.); Roy Keane 16'	Report

Lansdowne Road, Dublin
Attendance: 35,000
Referee: Vítor Melo Pereira (Portugal)
6 September 1998
20:00 UTC+2

Macedonia	4–0	Malta
Božinov 20', 47'; Šakiri 70', 76'	Report

Gradski stadion, Skopje
Attendance: 4,000
Referee: Jan Wegereef (Netherlands)

10 October 1998
18:00 UTC+2

Malta	1–4	Croatia
Suda 29' (pen.)	Report	Šimić 54'; Vugrinec 67', 74'; Šuker 82'

Ta' Qali National Stadium, Ta' Qali
Attendance: 5,170
Referee: Bohdan Benedik (Slovakia)

14 October 1998
19:15 UTC+2

Croatia	3–2	Macedonia
Šuker 16'; Boban 45', 70'	Report	Ćirić 2'; Šainovski 55'

Stadion Maksimir, Zagreb
Attendance: 8,541
Referee: Nikolai Levnikov (Russia)
14 October 1998
19:30 UTC+2

Republic of Ireland	5–0	Malta
Robbie Keane 17', 19'; Roy Keane 54'; Quinn 62'; Breen 82'	Report

Lansdowne Road, Dublin
Attendance: 34,500
Referee: Roy Helge Olsen (Norway)

18 November 1998
20:00 UTC+1

Malta	1–2	Macedonia
Sixsmith 69'	Report	Nikolovski 49'; Zaharievski 63'

Ta' Qali National Stadium, Ta' Qali
Attendance: 4,671
Referee: Sergei Shmolik (Belarus)
18 November 1998
20:00 UTC+1

FR Yugoslavia	1–0	Republic of Ireland
Mijatović 64'	Report

Red Star Stadium, Belgrade
Attendance: 28,250
Referee: Karl-Erik Nilsson (Sweden)

10 February 1999
15:00 UTC+1

Malta	0–3	FR Yugoslavia
	Report	Nađ 22', 55'; Milošević 90+1'

Ta' Qali National Stadium, Ta' Qali
Attendance: 5,167
Referee: Pascal Garibian (France)

5 June 1999
18:00 UTC+2

Macedonia	1–1	Croatia
Hristov 80'	Report	Šuker 20'

Gradski stadion, Skopje
Attendance: 10,000
Referee: Hugh Dallas (Scotland)

8 June 1999
20:15 UTC+2

FR Yugoslavia	4–1	Malta
Mijatović 34'; Milošević 48', 90'; Kovačević 74'	Report	Saliba 6'

Toumba Stadium, Thessaloniki (Note: Played at neutral ground due to the Kosovo War.)
Attendance: 3,000
Referee: Morgan Norman (Sweden)
9 June 1999
19:30 UTC+1

Republic of Ireland	1–0	Macedonia
Quinn 60'	Report

Lansdowne Road, Dublin
Attendance: 28,108
Referee: Urs Meier (Switzerland)

18 August 1999 (Note: Originally to be played in 27 March 1999, postponed because of the disruption caused to travel from the Balkan region by the Nato air strikes on Serbia.)
20:30 UTC+2

FR Yugoslavia	0–0	Croatia
	Report

Red Star Stadium, Belgrade
Attendance: 48,282
Referee: Kim Milton Nielsen (Denmark)

21 August 1999
20:30 UTC+2

Croatia	2–1	Malta
Stanić 34'; Soldo 55'	Report	Carabott 60'

Stadion Maksimir, Zagreb
Attendance: 19,205
Referee: Atanas Uzunov (Bulgaria)

1 September 1999
19:30 UTC+1

Republic of Ireland	2–1	FR Yugoslavia
Robbie Keane 54'; Kennedy 69'	Report	Stanković 60'

Lansdowne Road, Dublin
Attendance: 31,400
Referee: Pierluigi Collina (Italy)

4 September 1999
20:30 UTC+2

Croatia	1–0	Republic of Ireland
Šuker 90+1'	Report

Stadion Maksimir, Zagreb
Attendance: 21,032
Referee: Manuel Díaz Vega (Spain)
5 September 1999 (Note: Originally to be played on 31 March 1999, postponed because of the disruption caused to travel from the Balkan region by the Nato air strikes on Serbia.)
20:15 UTC+2

FR Yugoslavia	3–1	Macedonia
Stojković 37', 54'; Savićević 77'	Report	Ćirić 64' (pen.)

Partizan Stadium, Belgrade
Attendance: 20,320
Referee: Anders Frisk (Sweden)

8 September 1999
16:30 UTC+2

Macedonia	2–4	FR Yugoslavia
Šakiri 60'; Ćirić 90'	Report	Milošević 1'; Babunski 4' (o.g.); Stanković 14'; Drulović 38'

Gradski stadion, Skopje
Attendance: 13,000
Referee: Ľuboš Micheľ (Slovakia)
8 September 1999
18:30 UTC+2

Malta	2–3	Republic of Ireland
Said 61'; Carabott 68' (pen.)	Report	Keane 13'; Breen 20'; Staunton 72'

Ta' Qali National Stadium, Ta' Qali
Attendance: 8,122
Referee: Sorin Corpodean (Romania)

9 October 1999
19:30 UTC+2

Croatia	2–2	FR Yugoslavia
Bokšić 20'; Stanić 47'	Report	Mijatović 26'; Stanković 31'

Stadion Maksimir, Zagreb
Attendance: 38,743
Referee: José María García-Aranda (Spain)
9 October 1999
19:30 UTC+2

Macedonia	1–1	Republic of Ireland
Stavrevski 90'	Report	Quinn 18'

Gradski stadion, Skopje
Attendance: 6,500
Referee: Juan Fernández Marín (Spain)

== Goalscorers ==
There were 64 goals scored in 20 matches, for an average of 3.2 goals per match.

4 goals

- (Croatia national football team) Davor Šuker
- (Serbia and Montenegro national football team) Savo Milošević
- (Republic of Ireland national football team) Robbie Keane

3 goals

- (Serbia and Montenegro national football team) Predrag Mijatović
- (Serbia and Montenegro national football team) Dejan Stanković
- (North Macedonia national football team) Saša Ćirić
- (North Macedonia national football team) Artim Šakiri
- (Republic of Ireland national football team) Niall Quinn

2 goals

- (Croatia national football team) Zvonimir Boban
- (Croatia national football team) Mario Stanić
- (Croatia national football team) Davor Vugrinec
- (Serbia and Montenegro national football team) Albert Nađ
- (Serbia and Montenegro national football team) Dragan Stojković
- (North Macedonia national football team) Risto Božinov
- (Malta national football team) David Carabott
- (Republic of Ireland national football team) Gary Breen
- (Republic of Ireland national football team) Roy Keane

1 goal

- (Croatia national football team) Alen Bokšić
- (Croatia national football team) Dario Šimić
- (Croatia national football team) Zvonimir Soldo
- (Serbia and Montenegro national football team) Ljubinko Drulović
- (Serbia and Montenegro national football team) Darko Kovačević
- (Serbia and Montenegro national football team) Dejan Savićević
- (North Macedonia national football team) Gjorgji Hristov
- (North Macedonia national football team) Igor Nikolovski
- (North Macedonia national football team) Dževdet Šainovski
- (North Macedonia national football team) Goran Stavrevski
- (North Macedonia national football team) Srgjan Zaharievski
- (Malta national football team) Brian Said
- (Malta national football team) Nicky Saliba
- (Malta national football team) Paul Sixsmith
- (Malta national football team) Hubert Suda
- (Republic of Ireland national football team) Denis Irwin
- (Republic of Ireland national football team) Mark Kennedy
- (Republic of Ireland national football team) Steve Staunton

1 own goal

- (North Macedonia national football team) Boban Babunski (against FR Yugoslavia)
