= Blagoja =

Blagoja is a given name. Notable people with the name include:

- Blagoja Kitanovski (born 1962), former Macedonian football player, now assistant coach at FK Pelister
- Blagoja Kuleski (born 1962), retired Macedonian football player and currently a football manager
- Blagoja Milevski (born 1971), Macedonian international football player
- Blagoja Vidinić (1934–2006), Macedonian football coach and former player
