= FK Vardar in European football =

Macedonian club in European football

- Club: FK Vardar
- First entry: 1961–62 Cup Winners' Cup
- Latest entry: 2026–27 UEFA Champions League

This is the list of all FK Vardar's European matches.

== Summary ==
=== By competition ===
Competition	Pld	W	D	L	GF	GA	Last season played
European Cup; UEFA Champions League	24	5	8	11	30	40	2017–18
UEFA Cup; UEFA Europa League	38	7	9	22	24	70	2018–19
UEFA Conference League	4	2	1	1	7	8	2025–26
UEFA Cup Winners' Cup	4	1	0	3	2	8	1998–99
UEFA Intertoto Cup	6	3	0	3	12	10	2004
Total	75	17	18	40	73	135	

Source: UEFA.com, Last updated on 31 July 2025
Pld = Matches played; W = Matches won; D = Matches drawn; L = Matches lost; GF = Goals for; GA = Goals against. Defunct competitions indicated in italics.

== Results ==
Season	Competition	Round	Club	Home	Away	Aggregate
1961–62	Cup Winners' Cup	R1	(Scotland) Dunfermline Athletic	2–0	0–5	2–5
1985–86	UEFA Cup	R1	(Romania) Dinamo București	1–0	1–2	2–2 (a)
1985–86	UEFA Cup	R2	(Scotland) Dundee United	1–1	0–2	1–3
1987–88	European Cup	R1	(Portugal) Porto	0–3	0–3	0–6
1994–95	UEFA Cup	QR	(Hungary) Békéscsaba	1–1	0–1	1–2
1995–96	UEFA Cup	QR	(Georgia (country)) Samtredia	1–0	2–0	3–0
1995–96	UEFA Cup	R1	(France) Bordeaux	0–2	1–1	1–3
1996–97	UEFA Cup	QR1	(Slovenia) Gorica	2–1	1–0	3–1
1996–97	UEFA Cup	QR2	(Sweden) Halmstad	0–1	0–0	0–1
1998–99	Cup Winners' Cup	QR	(Slovakia) Spartak Trnava	0–1	0–2	0–3
1999–00	UEFA Cup	QR	(Poland) Legia Warsaw	0–5	0–4	0–9
2001–02	UEFA Cup	QR	(Belgium) Standard Liège	0–3	1–3	1–6
2002–03	Champions League	QR1	(Luxembourg) F91 Dudelange	3–0	1–1	4–1
2002–03	Champions League	QR2	(Poland) Legia Warsaw	1–3	1–1	2–4
2003–04	Champions League	QR1	(Wales) Barry Town	3–0	1–2	4–2
2003–04	Champions League	QR2	(Russia) CSKA Moscow	1–1	2–1	3–2
2003–04	Champions League	QR3	(Czech Republic) Sparta Prague	2–3	2–2	4–5
2003–04	UEFA Cup	R1	(Italy) Roma	1–1	0–4	1–5
2004	Intertoto Cup	R1	(Cyprus) Ethnikos Achna	5–1	5–1	10–2
2004	Intertoto Cup	R2	(Belgium) Gent	1–0	0–1 (a.e.t.)	1–1 (4–3 p.)
2004	Intertoto Cup	R3	(Germany) Schalke 04	1–2	0–5	1–7
2005–06	UEFA Cup	QR1	(Albania) Elbasani	0–0	1–1	1–1 (a)
2005–06	UEFA Cup	QR2	(Romania) Rapid București	1–1	0–3	1–4
2006–07	UEFA Cup	QR1	(Belgium) Roeselare	1–2	1–5	2–7
2007–08	UEFA Cup	QR1	(Cyprus) Anorthosis Famagusta	0–1	0–1	0–2
2012–13	Champions League	QR2	(Belarus) BATE Borisov	0–0	2–3	2–3
2013–14	Champions League	QR2	(Romania) Steaua București	1–2	0–3	1–5
2015–16	Champions League	QR2	(Cyprus) APOEL	1–1	0–0	1–1 (a)
2016–17	Champions League	QR2	(Croatia) Dinamo Zagreb	1–2	2–3	3–5
2017–18	Champions League	QR2	(Sweden) Malmö	3–1	1–1	4–2
2017–18	Champions League	QR3	(Denmark) Copenhagen	1–0	1–4	2–4
2017–18	Europa League	PO	(Turkey) Fenerbahçe	2–0	2–1	4–1
2017–18	Europa League	Group L	(Spain) Real Sociedad	0–6	0–3	4th out of 4
2017–18	Europa League	Group L	(Russia) Zenit Saint Petersburg	0–5	1–2	4th out of 4
2017–18	Europa League	Group L	(Norway) Rosenborg	1–1	1–3	4th out of 4
2018–19	Europa League	QR1	(Armenia) Pyunik	0–2	0–1	0–3
2025–26	Conference League	QR1	(San Marino) La Fiorita	3–0	2–2	5–2
2025–26	Conference League	QR2	(Switzerland) Lausanne-Sport	2–1	0–5	2–6
2026–27	Champions League	QR1	(Finland) KuPS	0–2	3–2 (a.e.t.)	3–4
2026–27	Conference League	QR2	(Latvia) Riga	2–3	2–5 (a.e.t.)	4–8

=== Player records ===
- Most appearances in UEFA club competitions: 21 appearances
  - Muarem Zekir
- Top scorers in UEFA club competitions: 13 goals
  - Wandeir Oliveira dos Santos

== UEFA club coefficient ranking ==
=== Current ===
(As of 19 April 2017), Source:

Rank	Movement	Team	Points	Change
253	▼ -39	(Cyprus) Anorthosis Famagusta	5.210	—
254	▼ -15	(Iceland) KR Reykjavik	5.175	—
255	▲ +42	(North Macedonia) Vardar	5.125	▲ +0.925
256	▲ +5	(Luxembourg) F91 Dudelange	4.975	—
257	▼ -24	(Belarus) FC Gomel	4.975	—

=== Rankings since 1999 ===
Season	Ranking	Movement	Points	Change
1998–99	223	—	3.457	—
1999–00	225	▼ -2	3.540	▲ +0.083
2000–01	—	—	1.748	▼ -1.702
2001–02	—	—	1.498	▼ -0.250
2002–03	—	—	1.748	▲ +0.250
2003–04	238	—	2.595	▲ +0.857
2004–05	235	▲ +3	2.485	▼ -0.110
2005–06	228	▲ +7	2.760	▲ +0.285
2006–07	217	▲ +9	2.925	▲ +0.165
2007–08	207	▲ +10	3.090	▲ +0.165
2008–09	—	—	1.033	▼ -2.057
2009–10	—	—	1.066	▲ +0.033
2010–11	—	—	1.041	▼ -0.025
2011–12	—	—	1.133	▲ +0.092
2012–13	357	—	2.050	▲ +0.917
2013–14	343	▲ +14	3.050	▲ +1.000
2014–15	340	▲ +3	3.175	▲ +0.025
2015–16	297	▲ +3	4.200	▲ +1.025
2016–17	255	▲ +42	5.125	▲ +0.925
