= Antonio Filevski =

Macedonian footballer (born 1966)

Personal information
- Date of birth: 26 March 1966 (age 60)
- Place of birth: Skopje, SR Macedonia, SFR Yugoslavia
- Position: Goalkeeper

Senior career*
Years	Team	Apps	(Gls)
1988–1993	Vardar	54	(0)
1993	Rio Ave	1	(0)
1994–1996	Vardar	65	(0)
1996	Mechelen	2	(0)
1997–1998	Vardar	63	(0)
1998–2000	Železnik	33	(0)
2000	Belasica	6	(0)
2001	Obilić	12	(0)

International career
1996–2001	Macedonia	10	(0)
- * Club domestic league appearances and goals

Antonio Filevski (Macedonian: Антонио Филевски; born 26 March 1966) is a Macedonian former professional footballer who played as a goalkeeper. At international level, he made ten appearances for the Macedonia national team.

== Club career ==
Filevski was the main goalkeeper in FK Vardar during almost the entire 1990s. The only exceptions were when he went to Portugal, for six months, in 1993, to play in Rio Ave, and, when he went, another six months, to Belgium, in 1996, to play in KV Mechelen. Since 1998, he played mostly in Serbia, first in FK Železnik for two seasons, and afterward, already before retiring, for the 1997–98 FR Yugoslavia champions FK Obilić. In between he had a six months spell in FK Belasica from Strumica.

== International career ==
Antonio had his first calls to play in the Macedonia national team while still playing in FK Vardar, in the still early stages of the national team. He made his senior debut for the team in a May 1996 friendly match against Bulgaria and has earned a total of ten caps. He was regular choice all until his retirement in 2001.

== Honours ==
- Vardar
  - Macedonian First League: 1992–93, 1993–94, 1994–95
  - Macedonian Cup: 1992–93, 1994–95, 1997–98
