= Muarem Zekir =

Macedonian footballer

Personal information
- Full name: Muarem Zekir
- Date of birth: 26 August 1973 (age 53)
- Place of birth: Skopje, SR Macedonia, SFR Yugoslavia
- Position: Goalkeeper

Youth career
- Vardar

Senior career*
| Years | Team | Apps | (Gls) |
| 1991–2004 | Vardar | 175 | (0) |
| 2005–2006 | Renova | 32 | (0) |
| Total | | 207 | (0) |

International career
| 2001–2002 | Macedonia | 4 | (0) |
- * Club domestic league appearances and goals

Muarem Zekir (Macedonian: Муарем Зекир; born 26 August 1973) is a retired Macedonian football goalkeeper of Turkish ethnicity, who last played for Renova.

== Club career ==
Born in Skopje, Zekir played for local giants Vardar and won 5 league titles and 3 domestic cups with the club.

== International career ==
He made his senior debut for Macedonia in a June 2001 World Cup qualification match against Moldova and has earned a total of 4 caps, scoring no goals. His final international was a January 2002 friendly match against Finland.

== Honours ==
- Macedonian First Football League: 5

1993, 1994, 1995, 2002, 2003

- Macedonian Football Cup: 3

1993, 1995, 1999
