= Sašo Janev =

Macedonian association football player

Personal information
- Date of birth: 3 May 1976 (age 50)
- Place of birth: Skopje, North Macedonia
- Height: 1.81 m (5 ft 11 in)
- Position: Defender

Senior career*
| Years | Team | Apps | (Gls) |
| –1998 | Vardar | | |
| 1999 | Emelec | | |
| 2000–2001 | Vardar | | |
| 2002 | Hutnik Kraków | 2 | (0) |
| 2002–2003 | Vardar | | |
| 2004 | Rabotnički | | |
| 2004–2005 | Shkëndija | 3 | (0) |
| 2005–2006 | Cementarnica | 16 | (0) |
| 2008–2009 | Devolli | | |

International career
| 2001–2002 | North Macedonia | 4 | (0) |
- * Club domestic league appearances and goals

Sašo Janev (Macedonian: Сашо Јанев; born 3 May 1970) is a Macedonian former professional footballer who played as a defender. He is now a coach.

== Career ==
Before the 1999 season, Janev signed for Ecuadorian side Emelec. Before the second half of 1999–00, he signed for Vardar in North Macedonia. Before the second half of 2001–02, he signed for Polish club Hutnik Kraków. In 2002, Janev returned to Vardar in the Macedonian top flight. After that, he signed for Albanian second-tier team Devolli.

He now works as a coach.

== Honours ==
Vardar

- Macedonian First Football League: 2001–02, 2002–03
