= Slavčo Georgievski =

Macedonian footballer

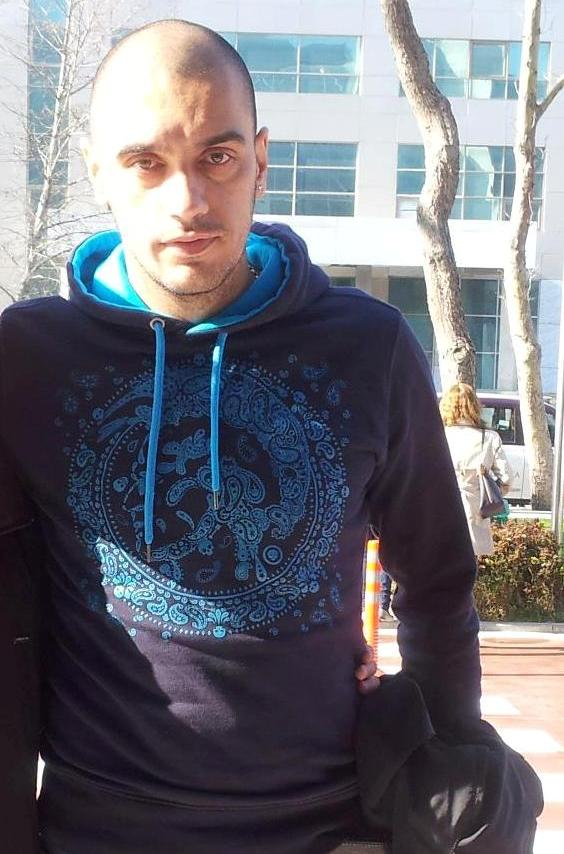

Personal information
- Full name: Slavčo Georgievski; Славчо Георгиевски
- Date of birth: 30 March 1980 (age 46)
- Place of birth: Skopje, SFR Yugoslavia
- Height: 1.87 m (6 ft 2 in)
- Position: Midfielder

Youth career
- 1990–1998: FK Vardar

Senior career*
Years	Team	Apps	(Gls)
1999–2000	Vardar	19	(2)
2000–2001	Makedonija	22	(6)
2001–2004	Vardar	71	(5)
2004	CFR Cluj	7	(0)
2005	Sloga Jugomagnat	6	(0)
2005	Cementarnica	6	(2)
2006	Vihren Sandanski	22	(2)
2007–2008	Slavia Sofia	39	(4)
2008	→ Zhejiang Lücheng (loan)	6	(0)
2009	Ulsan Hyundai	25	(2)
2010	Ethnikos Achnas	6	(0)
2010–2012	Neftchi Baku	61	(4)
2012–2015	Inter Baku	52	(2)

International career
2003–2011	Macedonia	22	(0)

Managerial career
- 2021–2022: Teteks
- 2022–: FK Skopje
- * Club domestic league appearances and goals as of 12 August 2015

Slavčo Georgievski (Macedonian: Славчо Георгиевски; born 30 March 1980 in Skopje, SR Macedonia, SFRY) is a retired footballer from Macedonia, who last played for Inter Baku as a midfielder and currently manager for FK Skopje.from 01.01-2025-... Fc Kozuf head coach

== Career ==
=== Club ===
Georgievski started his career in FK Vardar. After that he played for FK Makedonija GP, Romanian club CFR Cluj, FK Sloga, FK Cementarnica 55 Skopje and Bulgarian club Vihren. He signed with Slavia in June 2007 for a fee of €50 000. In the winter of 2008 he was loaned out for six months to Chinese club Zhejiang Lücheng. In June 2008 Georgievski returned to Slavia. In February 2009, he completed to move to K-League side Ulsan Hyundai. He scored his first goal for Ulsan Hyundai at match against FC Seoul. He joined Ethnikos Achnas in January 2010. He signed with Neftchi Baku on 9 June 2010.

=== International ===
He made his senior debut for Macedonia in a September 2003 European Championship qualification match away against Slovakia and has earned a total of 22 caps, scoring no goals. His final international was an August 2011 friendly match against Azerbaijan.

== Career statistics ==
=== Club ===
As of match played 3 December 2014

Club	Season	League			National Cup		Continental		Total	
Club	Season	Division	Apps	Goals	Apps	Goals	Apps	Goals	Apps	Goals
Vardar	1999–2000	1.MFL	19	2			2	0	21	2
Makedonija GjP	2000–01	1.MFL	22	6			–		22	2
Vardar	2001–02	1.MFL	17	0			1	0	18	0
Vardar	2002–03	1.MFL	28	3			4	1	32	4
Vardar	2003–04	1.MFL	26	2			6	2	32	4
Vardar	Total		71	5	0	0	11	3	82	8
CFR Cluj	2004–05	Divizia A	7	0			–		7	0
Sloga Jugomagnat	2004–05	1.MFL	6	0			–		6	0
Cementarnica 55	2005–06	1.MFL	6	2			–		6	2
Vihren Sandanski	2005–06	A Group	11	0			–		11	0
Vihren Sandanski	2006–07	A Group	11	2			–		11	2
Vihren Sandanski	Total		22	2	0	0	-	-	22	2
Slavia Sofia	2006–07	A Group	10	0			–		10	0
Slavia Sofia	2007–08	A Group	15	1			–		15	1
Slavia Sofia	2008–09	A Group	14	3			–		14	3
Slavia Sofia	Total		39	4	0	0	-	-	39	4
Zhejiang Greentown (loan)	2008	Chinese Super League	6	0			–		6	0
Ulsan Hyundai	2009	K League	25	2			–		25	2
Ethnikos Achnas	2009–10	Cypriot First Division	6	0			–		6	0
Neftchi Baku	2010–11	Azerbaijan Premier League	29	0	3	1	-		32	1
Neftchi Baku	2011–12	Azerbaijan Premier League	32	4	5	0	2	0	39	4
Neftchi Baku	Total		61	4	8	1	2	0	71	5
Inter Baku	2012–13	Azerbaijan Premier League	30	1	3	0	4	1	37	2
Inter Baku	2013–14	Azerbaijan Premier League	21	1	1	0	4	0	26	1
Inter Baku	2014–15	Azerbaijan Premier League	1	0	1	0	4	1	6	1
Inter Baku	Total		52	2	5	0	12	2	69	4
Career total			342	29	13	1	27	5	382	35

=== International ===
Macedonia
Year	Apps	Goals
2003	1	0
2007	1	0
2008	1	0
2009	7	0
2010	7	0
2011	3	0
Total	20	0

Statistics accurate as of match played 7 October 2010

== Honours ==
FK Vardar

- Macedonian First League (2): 2001–02, 2002–03

Neftchi Baku

- Azerbaijan League (2): 2010–11, 2011–12
