= North Macedonia national football team results =

This page lists all the matches played by the North Macedonia national football team since 2019 when the country was renamed North Macedonia according to the Prespa agreement.

For games played between 1993 and 2018, see Macedonia national football team results.

== Key ==
Key to matches

- Att. = Match attendance
- (H) = Home ground
- (A) = Away ground
- (N) = Neutral ground

Key to record by opponent

- Pld = Games played
- W = Games won
- D = Games drawn
- L = Games lost
- GF = Goals for
- GA = Goals against

== Results ==
North Macedonia's score is shown first in each case.

North Macedonia national football team results
No.	Date	Venue	Opponents	Score	Competition	North Macedonia scorers	Att.	Ref.
227	21 March 2019	Philip II Arena, Skopje (H)	Latvia	3–1	UEFA Euro 2020 qualifying	Alioski, Elmas (2)	7,043	
228	24 March 2019	Stožice Stadium, Ljubljana (A)	Slovenia	1–1	UEFA Euro 2020 qualifying	Bardhi	9,872	
229	7 June 2019	Toše Proeski Arena, Skopje (H)	Poland	0–1	UEFA Euro 2020 qualifying		25,000	
230	10 June 2019	Toše Proeski Arena, Skopje (H)	Austria	1–4	UEFA Euro 2020 qualifying	Hinteregger (o.g.)	10,501	
231	5 September 2019	Turner Stadium, Be'er Sheva (A)	Israel	1–1	UEFA Euro 2020 qualifying	Ademi	15,200	
232	9 September 2019	Daugava Stadium, Riga (A)	Latvia	2–0	UEFA Euro 2020 qualifying	Pandev, Bardhi	2,724	
233	10 October 2019	Toše Proeski Arena, Skopje (H)	Slovenia	2–1	UEFA Euro 2020 qualifying	Elmas (2)	16,500	
234	13 October 2019	Stadion Narodowy, Warsaw (A)	Poland	0–2	UEFA Euro 2020 qualifying		52,894	
235	16 November 2019	Ernst-Happel-Stadion, Vienna (A)	Austria	1–2	UEFA Euro 2020 qualifying	Stojanovski	41,100	
236	19 November 2019	Toše Proeski Arena, Skopje (H)	Israel	1–0	UEFA Euro 2020 qualifying	Nikolov	5,573	
237	5 September 2020	Toše Proeski Arena, Skopje (H)	Armenia	2–1	2020–21 UEFA Nations League	Alioski, Nestorovski	0 (Note: Match played behind closed doors due to the COVID-19 pandemic in Europe.)	
238	8 September 2020	Boris Paichadze Dinamo Arena, Tbilisi (A)	Georgia	1–1	2020–21 UEFA Nations League	S. Ristovski	0	
239	8 October 2020	Toše Proeski Arena, Skopje (H)	Kosovo	2–1	UEFA Euro 2020 qualifying play-offs	Kololli (o.g.), Velkovski	0	
240	11 October 2020	Lilleküla Stadium, Tallinn (A)	Estonia	3–3	2020–21 UEFA Nations League	Kuusk (o.g.), Pandev, Zajkov	908	
241	14 October 2020	Toše Proeski Arena, Skopje (H)	Georgia	1–1	2020–21 UEFA Nations League	Alioski	0	
242	12 November 2020	Boris Paichadze Dinamo Arena, Tbilisi (A)	Georgia	1–0	UEFA Euro 2020 qualifying play-offs		0	
243	15 November 2020	Toše Proeski Arena, Skopje (H)	Estonia	2–1	2020–21 UEFA Nations League	Trichkovski, Stojanovski	0	
244	18 November 2020	GSP Stadium, Nicosia (A) (Note: Armenia played their home match against North Macedonia in the 2020–21 UEFA Nations League in Nicosia, Cyprus due to the 2020 Nagorno-Karabakh conflict.)	Armenia	0–1	2020–21 UEFA Nations League		0	
245	25 March 2021	Arena Națională, Bucharest (A)	Romania	2–3	2022 FIFA World Cup qualification	Ademi, Trajkovski	0	
246	28 March 2021	Toše Proeski Arena, Skopje (H)	Liechtenstein	5–0	2022 FIFA World Cup qualification	Bardhi, Trajkovski (2), Elmas, Nestorovski	0	
247	31 March 2021	MSV-Arena, Duisburg (A)	Germany	2–1	2022 FIFA World Cup qualification	Pandev, Elmas	0	
248	1 June 2021	Toše Proeski Arena, Skopje (H)	Slovenia	1–1	Friendly	Elmas	10,000	
249	4 June 2021	Toše Proeski Arena, Skopje (H)	Kazakhstan	4–0	Friendly	Alioski, Trichkovski, M. Ristovski, Churlinov	10,000	
250	13 June 2021	Arena Națională, Bucharest (N)	Austria	1–3	UEFA Euro 2020	Pandev	9,082	
251	17 June 2021	Arena Națională, Bucharest (N)	Ukraine	1–2	UEFA Euro 2020	Alioski	10,001	
252	21 June 2021	Johan Cruyff Arena, Amsterdam (N)	Netherlands	0–3	UEFA Euro 2020		15,227	
253	2 September 2021	Toše Proeski Arena, Skopje (H)	Armenia	0–0	2022 FIFA World Cup qualification		3,147	
254	5 September 2021	Laugardalsvöllur, Reykjavík (A)	Iceland	2–2	2022 FIFA World Cup qualification	Velkovski, Alioski	1,862	
255	8 September 2021	Toše Proeski Arena, Skopje (H)	Romania	0–0	2022 FIFA World Cup qualification		5,260	
256	8 October 2021	Rheinpark Stadion, Vaduz (A)	Liechtenstein	4–0	2022 FIFA World Cup qualification	Velkovski, Alioski, Nikolov, Churlinov	1,628	
257	11 October 2021	Toše Proeski Arena, Skopje (H)	Germany	0–4	2022 FIFA World Cup qualification		16,182	
258	11 November 2021	Vazgen Sargsyan Republican Stadium, Yerevan (A)	Armenia	5–0	2022 FIFA World Cup qualification	Trajkovski, Bardhi (3), M. Ristovski	7,200	
259	14 November 2021	Toše Proeski Arena, Skopje (H)	Iceland	3–1	2022 FIFA World Cup qualification	Alioski, Elmas (2)	15,986	
260	24 March 2022	Stadio Renzo Barbera, Palermo (A)	Italy	1–0	2022 FIFA World Cup qualification play-off	Trajkovski	34,129	
261	29 March 2022	Estádio do Dragão, Porto (A)	Portugal	0–2	2022 FIFA World Cup qualification play-off		48,010	
262	2 June 2022	Huvepharma Arena, Razgrad (A)	Bulgaria	1–1	2022–23 UEFA Nations League	M. Ristovski	8,275	
263	5 June 2022	Victoria Stadium, Gibraltar (A)	Gibraltar	2–0	2022–23 UEFA Nations League	Bardhi, Nikolov	703	
264	9 June 2022	Toše Proeski Arena, Skopje (H)	Georgia	0–3	2022–23 UEFA Nations League		10,775	
265	12 June 2022	Toše Proeski Arena, Skopje (H)	Gibraltar	4–0	2022–23 UEFA Nations League	Bardhi, Torrilla (o.g.), Miovski, Churlinov	4,750	
266	23 September 2022	Boris Paichadze Dinamo Arena, Tbilisi (A)	Georgia	0–2	2022–23 UEFA Nations League		54,200	
267	26 September 2022	Toše Proeski Arena, Skopje (H)	Bulgaria	0–1	2022–23 UEFA Nations League		20,173	
268	22 October 2022	Zayed Sports City Stadium, Abu Dhabi (N)	Saudi Arabia	0–1	Friendly		20,173	
269	17 November 2022	Toše Proeski Arena, Skopje (H)	Finland	1–1	Friendly	Bardhi	2,000	
270	20 November 2022	Toše Proeski Arena, Skopje (H)	Azerbaijan	1–3	Friendly	Bardhi	1,000	
271	23 March 2023	Toše Proeski Arena, Skopje (H)	Malta	2–1	UEFA Euro 2024 qualifying	Elmas, Churlinov	9,991	
272	27 March 2023	Toše Proeski Arena, Skopje (H)	Faroe Islands	1–0	Friendly	Miovski	500	
273	16 June 2023	Toše Proeski Arena, Skopje (H)	Ukraine	2–3	UEFA Euro 2024 qualifying	Bardhi, Elmas	14,370	
274	19 June 2023	Old Trafford, Manchester (A)	England	0–7	UEFA Euro 2024 qualifying		70,708	
275	9 September 2023	Toše Proeski Arena, Skopje (H)	Italy	1–1	UEFA Euro 2024 qualifying	Bardhi	28,126	
276	12 September 2023	National Stadium, Ta' Qali (A)	Malta	2–0	UEFA Euro 2024 qualifying	Elmas, Manev	3,158	
277	14 October 2023	Stadion Letná, Prague (A) (Note: Ukraine played their home match against North Macedonia in qualifying for UEFA Euro 2024 in Prague, Czech Republic due to the Russo-Ukrainian War.)	Ukraine	0–2	UEFA Euro 2024 qualifying		12,939	
278	17 October 2023	Stadion Blagoj Istatov, Strumica (H)	Armenia	3–1	Friendly	Trajkovski, Ristovski, Daci	2,000	
279	17 November 2023	Stadio Olimpico, Rome (A)	Italy	2–5	UEFA Euro 2024 qualifying	Atanasov (2)	56,364	
280	20 November 2023	Toše Proeski Arena, Skopje (H)	England	1–1	UEFA Euro 2024 qualifying	Bardhi	27,982	
281	22 March 2024	Mardan Sports Complex, Boztepe (N)	Moldova	1–1	Friendly		100	
282	25 March 2024	Mardan Sports Complex, Boztepe (N)	Montenegro	0–1	Friendly		250	
283	3 June 2024	Stadion Rujevica, Rijeka (A)	Croatia	0–3	Friendly		8,030	
284	10 June 2024	Malšovická aréna, Hradec Králové (A)	Czech Republic	1–2	Friendly	Alimi	8,864	
285	7 September 2024	Tórsvøllur, Tórshavn (A)	Faroe Islands	1–1	2024–25 UEFA Nations League	Bardhi	2,057	
286	10 September 2024	Toše Proeski Arena, Skopje (H)	Armenia	2–0	2024–25 UEFA Nations League	Bardhi, Miovski	6,829	
287	10 October 2024	Skonto Stadium, Riga (A)	Latvia	3–0	2024–25 UEFA Nations League	Atanasov, Qamili, Elmas	5,001	
288	13 October 2024	Vazgen Sargsyan Republican Stadium, Yerevan (A)	Armenia	2–0	2024–25 UEFA Nations League	Miovski, Alimi	14,371	
289	14 November 2024	Toše Proeski Arena, Skopje (H)	Latvia	1–0	2024–25 UEFA Nations League	Serafimov	8,851	
290	17 November 2024	Toše Proeski Arena, Skopje (H)	Faroe Islands	1–0	2024–25 UEFA Nations League	Miovski	7,450	
291	22 March 2025	Rheinpark Stadion, Vaduz (A)	Liechtenstein	3–0	2026 FIFA World Cup qualification	Trajkovski, Musliu, Miovski	4,094	
292	25 March 2025	Toše Proeski Arena, Skopje (H)	Wales	1–1	2026 FIFA World Cup qualification	Miovski	23,114	
293	6 June 2025	Toše Proeski Arena, Skopje (H)	Belgium	1–1	2026 FIFA World Cup qualification	Alioski	23,070	
294	9 June 2025	Astana Arena, Astana (A)	Kazakhstan	1–0	2026 FIFA World Cup qualification	Trajkovski	27,694	
295	4 September 2025	FK Viktoria Stadion, Prague (N)	Saudi Arabia	1–2	Friendly	Trajkovski	500	
296	7 September 2025	Toše Proeski Arena, Skopje (H)	Liechtenstein	5–0	2026 FIFA World Cup qualification	Büchel (o.g.), Bardhi, Churlinov, Qamili, Stankovski	8,693	
297	10 October 2025	Arteveldestadion, Ghent (A)	Belgium	0–0	2026 FIFA World Cup qualification		18,583	
298	13 October 2025	Toše Proeski Arena, Skopje (H)	Kazakhstan	1–1	2026 FIFA World Cup qualification	Bardhi	19,929	
299	13 November 2025	Toše Proeski Arena, Skopje (H)	Latvia	0–0	Friendly		4,000	
300	18 November 2025	Cardiff City Stadium, Cardiff (A)	Wales	1–7	2026 FIFA World Cup qualification	Miovski	32,154	
301	26 March 2026	Parken Stadium, Copenhagen (A)	Denmark	0–4	2026 FIFA World Cup qualification play-off		35,746	
302	31 March 2026	Aviva Stadium, Dublin (A)	Republic of Ireland	0–0	Friendly		39,560	
303	29 May 2026	Stadion Koševo, Sarajevo (A)	Bosnia and Herzegovina	0–0	Friendly		28,961	
304	1 June 2026	Şükrü Saracoğlu Stadium, Istanbul (A)	Turkey	0–4	Friendly		33,994	
305	26 September 2026	Toše Proeski Arena, Skopje (H)	Switzerland	0–3	2026–27 Nations League		11,474	
306	29 September 2026	Stožice Stadium, Ljubljana (A)	Slovenia	0–2	2026–27 Nations League		10,246	
307	3 October 2026	Toše Proeski Arena, Skopje (H)	Scotland	0–2	2026–27 Nations League		8,256	
308	6 October 2026	Thermoplan Arena, Lucerne (A)	Switzerland	0–3	2026–27 Nations League		15,730	
309	13 November 2026	Hampden Park, Glasgow (A)	Scotland	1–2	2026–27 Nations League	Rastoder	41,585	
310	16 November 2026	Toše Proeski Arena, Skopje (H)	Slovenia	0–3	2026–27 Nations League		1,875	

== Record by opponent ==
Team	Pld	W	D	L	GF	GA	GD	WPCT
Armenia	7	5	1	1	14	0	+14	71.43
Austria	3	0	0	3	3	9	−6	0.00
Azerbaijan	1	0	0	1	1	3	−2	0.00
Belgium	2	0	2	0	1	1	0	0.00
Bosnia and Herzegovina	1	0	1	0	0	0	0	0.00
Bulgaria	2	0	1	1	1	2	−1	0.00
Croatia	1	0	0	1	0	3	−3	0.00
Czech Republic	1	0	0	1	1	2	−1	0.00
Denmark	1	0	0	1	0	4	−4	0.00
England	2	0	1	1	1	8	−7	0.00
Estonia	2	1	1	0	5	4	+1	50.00
Faroe Islands	3	2	1	0	3	1	+2	66.67
Finland	1	0	1	0	1	1	0	0.00
Georgia	5	1	2	2	3	5	−2	20.00
Germany	2	1	0	1	2	5	−3	50.00
Gibraltar	2	2	0	0	6	0	+6	100.00
Republic of Ireland	1	0	1	0	0	0	0	0.00
Iceland	2	1	1	0	5	3	+2	50.00
Israel	2	1	1	0	2	1	+1	50.00
Italy	3	1	1	1	4	6	−2	33.33
Kazakhstan	3	2	1	0	6	1	+5	66.67
Kosovo	1	1	0	0	2	1	+1	100.00
Latvia	5	4	1	0	9	1	+8	80.00
Liechtenstein	4	4	0	0	17	0	+17	100.00
Malta	2	2	0	0	4	1	+3	100.00
Moldova	1	0	1	0	1	1	0	0.00
Montenegro	1	0	0	1	0	1	−1	0.00
Netherlands	1	0	0	1	0	3	−3	0.00
Poland	2	0	0	2	0	3	−3	0.00
Portugal	1	0	0	1	0	2	−2	0.00
Romania	2	0	1	1	2	3	−1	0.00
Saudi Arabia	2	0	0	2	1	3	−2	0.00
Scotland	2	0	0	2	1	4	−3	0.00
Slovenia	5	1	2	2	4	8	−4	20.00
Switzerland	2	0	0	2	0	6	−6	0.00
Turkey	1	0	0	1	0	4	−4	0.00
Ukraine	3	0	0	3	3	7	−4	0.00
Wales	2	0	1	1	2	8	−6	0.00
Total	84	29	22	33	105	115	−10	34.52

Source: Results
