= Paul Sixsmith =

Maltese footballer

Personal information
- Date of birth: 22 September 1971 (age 55)
- Place of birth: Bolton, England
- Position: Defender

Youth career
- 1991–1992: Manchester United
- 1992–1993: Preston North End

Senior career*
Years	Team	Apps	(Gls)
1993–2006	Naxxar Lions	232	(40)

International career
1998–1999	Malta	11	(1)

Managerial career
- 2006-2007: Naxxar Lions
- * Club domestic league appearances and goals

Paul Sixsmith (born 22 September 1971) is a Maltese former international footballer and coach.

== Playing career ==
Born in Bolton, England, Sixsmith played youth football with both Manchester United and Preston North End, but did not make a league appearance for either team. He then moved to Malta, where he played with Naxxar Lions and earned 11 caps for the Maltese national side before retiring in 2006.

He took charge of Naxxar in the 2006/07 season.
