= Vlatko Grozdanoski =

Macedonian association football player

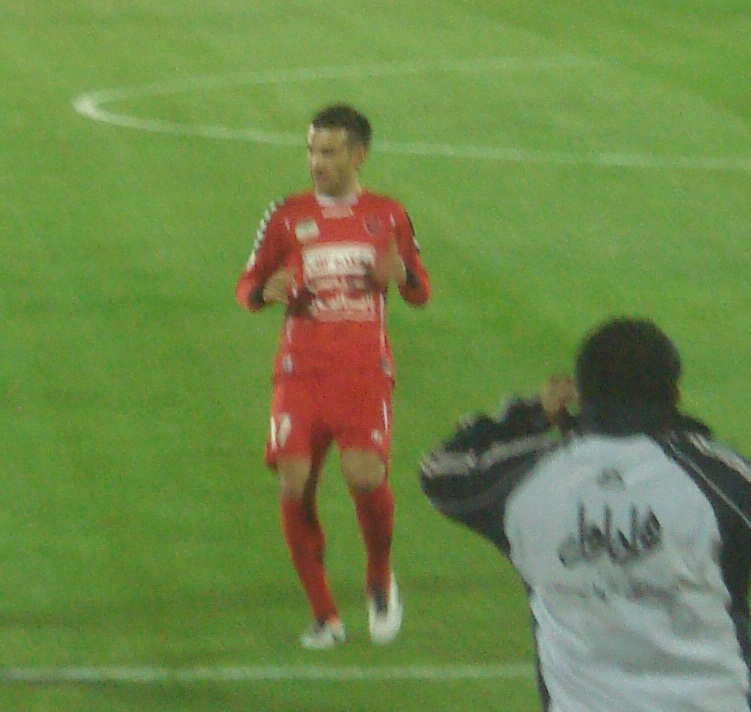
- Grozdanoski in 2013

Personal information
- Full name: Vlatko Grozdanoski
- Date of birth: 30 January 1983 (age 43)
- Place of birth: Skopje, SR Macedonia
- Height: 1.78 m (5 ft 10 in)
- Position: Midfielder

Youth career
- 1998–1999: Cementarnica 55

Senior career*
| Years | Team | Apps | (Gls) |
| 1999–2003 | Cementarnica 55 | 59 | (12) |
| 2003–2004 | Vardar | 45 | (5) |
| 2004–2008 | Omonia | 71 | (9) |
| 2008–2009 | Vojvodina | 35 | (7) |
| 2009–2010 | AEL Limassol | 9 | (1) |
| 2010–2011 | Damash Iranian | 20 | (6) |
| 2011 | Rabotnički | 0 | (0) |
| 2011–2012 | Vardar | 10 | (1) |
| 2012 | Liaoning Whowin | 25 | (3) |
| 2013 | Persepolis | 10 | (2) |
| 2013–2017 | Vardar | 61 | (6) |
| Total | | 346 | (52) |

International career
| 1999–2000 | Macedonia U17 | 2 | (0) |
| 2000 | Macedonia U19 | 3 | (1) |
| 2000–2002 | Macedonia U21 | 14 | (2) |
| 2001–2011 | Macedonia | 50 | (4) |
- * Club domestic league appearances and goals

Vlatko Grozdanoski (Macedonian: Влатко Грозданоски; born 30 January 1983) is a Macedonian retired footballer who played as a midfielder. He represented the Macedonia national team on 50 occasions.

== Club career ==
Grozdanoski began his career in 1999, playing for FK Cementarnica 55. His first game for that team was in the Macedonian First League on 25 March 2000 against FK Vardar when he was only 17 years and 2 months. He played with Cementarnica 55 in the Macedonian Cup Final versus FK Pobeda. He stayed with Cementarnica 55 until December 2002, when he signed to play for FK Vardar, where he remained for 1 year and 7 months before he signed for AC Omonia in 2004. During the 2001–02 season he won the best young player award in the Macedonian First League. With Vardar he won the Macedonian First League Title. He also participated in the Champions League with Vardar, who fell 1 game short of qualifying for the Champions League group stage. He scored against CSKA Moscow in Moscow where Vardar Skopje won 2:1. In the summer of 2004 he signed for the most famous team in Cyprus, Omonia. As an Omonia player, he won the Cypriot Cup and the Super Cup in 2005. He wore the number seven jersey for Omonia. Grozdanoski was awarded the best young foreign player in Cypriot First Division for the 2006–07 season. In January 2008 he signed a 2-year contract with FK Vojvodina. In the first 6 months he had great performances, scoring 5 goals in 13 games. For FK Vojvodina Grozdanoski played 37 games and scored 7 goals in all competition. He has recently signed a 1.5-year contract with the AEL Limassol football team. His first game for AEL Limassol was on 1 March 2010 against Nea Salamis Famagusta FC when coach Dušan Uhrin, Jr. give him chance to play in the last 20 minutes. Grozdanoski scored his first goal in the yellow shirt on the game against Enosis Neon Paralimni FC on 27 March 2010. On 12 August Grozdanoski signed a 1-year contract with Damash Iranian F.C. After his contract expired, he decided to go back to the Macedonian League and signed for Rabotnički. Later he signed with the best club in Macedonia, FK Vardar.

== International career ==
He debut for the national team when he was just 18 years old against Oman (30 December 2001). He scored his first goal for Macedonia against Turkey national football team in a EURO 2004 qualifying match on 12 October 2002. He then followed that up with another goals against Turkey in another EURO 2004 qualifying match on 11 June 2003, against Estonia in a friendly match on 11 June 2004 and against Luxembourg on 20 August 2008. As of now, he has 50 caps and 4 goals for Republic of Macedonia national football team. He has earned a total of 50 caps, scoring 4 goals. His final international was an October 2011 European Championship qualification match against Slovakia.

== Career statistics ==
=== Club ===
| Club | Season | League | | National cup | | Continental | | Other | | Total | |
| Club | Season | Apps | Goals | Apps | Goals | Apps | Goals | Apps | Goals | Apps | Goals |
|---|---|---|---|---|---|---|---|---|---|---|---|
| Cementarnica 55 | 1999–00 | 8 | 0 | - | - | - | - | - | - | 8 | 0 |
| Cementarnica 55 | 2000–01 | 9 | 5 | 2 | 0 | 0 | 0 | - | - | 11 | 5 |
| Cementarnica 55 | 2001–02 | 26 | 4 | 6 | 2 | - | - | - | - | 32 | 6 |
| Cementarnica 55 | 2002–03 | 16 | 3 | 4 | 1 | 2 | 0 | - | - | 22 | 4 |
| Cementarnica 55 | Total | 59 | 12 | 12 | 3 | 2 | 0 | - | - | 73 | 15 |
| Vardar | 2002–03 | 16 | 3 | 2 | 1 | 0 | 0 | - | - | 18 | 4 |
| Vardar | 2003–04 | 25 | 2 | 2 | 1 | 6 | 1 | - | - | 33 | 4 |
| Vardar | 2004–05 | 4 | 0 | 1 | 0 | 6 | 0 | - | - | 10 | 0 |
| Vardar | Total | 45 | 5 | 4 | 2 | 12 | 1 | - | - | 61 | 8 |
| AC Omonia | 2004–05 | 20 | 3 | 7 | 3 | 0 | 0 | - | - | 27 | 6 |
| AC Omonia | 2005–06 | 22 | 3 | 4 | 1 | 4 | 2 | - | - | 30 | 6 |
| AC Omonia | 2006–07 | 19 | 3 | 5 | 5 | 3 | 1 | - | - | 27 | 9 |
| AC Omonia | 2007–08 | 10 | 0 | 1 | 0 | 1 | 0 | - | - | 11 | 0 |
| AC Omonia | Total | 71 | 9 | 17 | 9 | 8 | 3 | - | - | 96 | 21 |
| Vojvodina | 2007–08 | 13 | 5 | 0 | 0 | 3 | 0 | - | - | 16 | 5 |
| Vojvodina | 2008–09 | 22 | 2 | 4 | 1 | 1 | 0 | - | - | 27 | 3 |
| Vojvodina | Total | 35 | 7 | 4 | 1 | 4 | 0 | - | - | 43 | 8 |
| AEL Limassol | 2009–10 | 9 | 1 | 0 | 0 | 0 | 0 | - | - | 9 | 1 |
| AEL Limassol | Total | 9 | 1 | 0 | 0 | 0 | 0 | - | - | 9 | 1 |
| Damash Iranian | 2010–11 | 20 | 6 | 1 | 1 | 0 | 0 | - | - | 21 | 7 |
| Damash Iranian | Total | 20 | 6 | 1 | 1 | 0 | 0 | - | - | 21 | 7 |
| Rabotnički | 2011–12 | 0 | 0 | 0 | 0 | 2 | 1 | - | - | 2 | 1 |
| Rabotnički | Total | 0 | 0 | 0 | 0 | 2 | 1 | - | - | 2 | 1 |
| Vardar | 2011–12 | 10 | 1 | 2 | 0 | 0 | 0 | - | - | 12 | 1 |
| Vardar | Total | 10 | 1 | 2 | 0 | 0 | 0 | - | - | 12 | 1 |
| Liaoning Whowin | 2012 | 25 | 3 | 2 | 0 | 0 | 0 | - | - | 27 | 3 |
| Liaoning Whowin | Total | 25 | 3 | 2 | 0 | 0 | 0 | - | - | 27 | 3 |
| Persepolis | 2012–13 | 10 | 2 | 2 | 0 | 0 | 0 | - | - | 12 | 2 |
| Persepolis | Total | 10 | 2 | 2 | 0 | 0 | 0 | - | - | 12 | 2 |
| Vardar | 2013–14 | 24 | 3 | 2 | 0 | 0 | 0 | - | - | 26 | 3 |
| Vardar | Total | 24 | 3 | 2 | 0 | 0 | 0 | - | - | 26 | 3 |
| Career total | | 308 | 49 | 46 | 16 | 28 | 5 | - | - | 377 | 70 |

=== International ===
Appearances and goals by national team and year
| National team | Year | Apps | Goals |
|---|---|---|---|
| Macedonia | 2001 | 1 | 0 |
| Macedonia | 2002 | 6 | 1 |
| Macedonia | 2003 | 8 | 1 |
| Macedonia | 2004 | 3 | 1 |
| Macedonia | 2005 | 5 | 0 |
| Macedonia | 2006 | 4 | 0 |
| Macedonia | 2007 | 6 | 0 |
| Macedonia | 2008 | 8 | 1 |
| Macedonia | 2009 | 6 | 0 |
| Macedonia | 2010 | 1 | 0 |
| Macedonia | 2011 | 2 | 0 |
| Total | | 50 | 4 |

Scores and results list Macedonia's goal tally first, score column indicates score after each Grozdanoski goal.

List of international goals scored by Vlatko Grozdanoski
| No. | Date | Venue | Opponent | Score | Result | Competition | Ref. |
|---|---|---|---|---|---|---|---|
| 1 | 12 October 2002 | City Park Stadium, Skopje, Macedonia | Turkey | 1–0 | 1–2 | UEFA Euro 2004 qualifying | |
| 2 | 11 June 2003 | İnönü Stadium, Istanbul, Turkey | Turkey | 1–0 | 2–3 | UEFA Euro 2004 qualifying | |
| 3 | 11 June 2004 | Lilleküla Stadium, Tallinn, Estonia | Estonia | 4–2 | 4–2 | Friendly | |
| 4 | 20 August 2008 | Stade Josy Barthel, Luxembourg City, Luxembourg | Luxembourg | 2–0 | 4–1 | Friendly | |

== Honours ==
Cemenentarnica

- Macedonian Football Cup: 2002–03

Vardar

- Macedonian First League:

2011–12, 2014–15, 2015–16, 2016–17

- Macedonian Football Supercup:

2015

Omonia

- Cypriot Cup: 2004–05
- Cypriot Super Cup: 2005

Individual

- Macedonian First League Young Player of the Year: 2002–03
- Cypriot First Division Young Foreign Player of the Year: 2006–07
