= Toni Pitoška =

Macedonian footballer

Personal information
- Full name: Toni Pitoška; Тони Питошка
- Date of birth: 24 July 1982 (age 44)
- Height: 1.82 m (6 ft 0 in)
- Position: Striker

Senior career*
Years	Team	Apps	(Gls)
1999–2000	Pelister		
2000–2002	Bregalnica Kraun		
2002–2004	Marek Dupnitsa		
2004-2006	Bregalnica Kraun		
2006–2007	Marek Dupnitsa		
2007-2012	Pelister		
- * Club domestic league appearances and goals as of 4 August 2015

Toni Pitoška (Macedonian: Тони Питошка; born 24 July 1982) is a Macedonian retired footballer who last played as a forward for FK Pelister in the Macedonian First League.
