= Žarko Serafimovski =

Footballer

Personal information
- Full name: Žarko Serafimovski; Жарко Серафимовски
- Date of birth: 13 February 1971 (age 55)
- Place of birth: Skopje, SFR Yugoslavia
- Height: 1.72 m (5 ft 7 1/2 in)
- Position: Midfielder

Senior career*
Years	Team	Apps	(Gls)
–1994	Ljuboten		
1994–1996	Vardar	52	(8)
1996–1998	Young Boys	4	(0)
1999–2000	Makedonija GP	20	(4)
2000–2001	Trabzonspor	16	(2)
2001–2002	Hapoel Be'er Sheva	15	(0)
2002–2003	Lokomotiv Plovdiv	28	(6)
2004–2006	Vardar	57	(11)
2006–2007	Renova	23	(1)

International career
1994–2001	Macedonia	34	(3)
- * Club domestic league appearances and goals as of 22 December 2009

Žarko Serafimovski (Macedonian: Жарко Серафимовски; born 13 February 1971, in Skopje, SFR Yugoslavia) is a retired football midfielder from the present-day North Macedonia.

== International career ==
Serafimovski made his debut for the Macedonian national team in a March 1994 friendly match against Slovenia, in which he immediately scored a goal, Macedonia's 5th goal ever in their second ever official match. He earned 34 caps and scored 3 goals in total. His final international was a September 2001 FIFA World Cup qualification match against Azerbaijan.
