= Žanko Savov =

Macedonian footballer

Personal information
- Date of birth: 14 September 1965 (age 61)
- Place of birth: Udovo, Valandovo, SFR Yugoslavia
- Position: Forward

Team information
- Current team: GFK Kumanovo (manager)

Senior career*
| Years | Team | Apps | (Gls) |
| 1988–1989 | Belasica | 28 | (6) |
| 1989–1993 | Pelister | 40 | (4) |
| 1993–1995 | Vardar | 60 | (15) |
| 1995–1998 | Jeonbuk Hyundai Dinos | 93 | (16) |
- Radnički Niš
| 1999–2004 | Cementarnica 55 | | |

Managerial career
- 2005: Cementarnica 55
- FK Aerodrom
- 2013–2014: Borec
- 2017-2019: Pobeda Valandovo
- 2019-: Osogovo
- * Club domestic league appearances and goals

Žanko Savov (Macedonian: Жанко Савов; born 14 September 1965) is a North Macedonia]] football coach and former forward.

== Playing career ==
Born in Udovo, Valandovo, SR Macedonia, back then within SFR Yugoslavia, he started his career in the Yugoslav Second League playing with FK Belasica and FK Pelister between 1988 and 1991. By 2016 he is listed among FK Vardar legends at club official website. He played with Vardar between 1991 and 1995 having won three national championships and two cups. Vardar official website considers him as the player that dominated Macedonian football at the first three seasons of the Macedonian First Football League. He was also the player of the match at the final of the first edition of the Macedonian Cup as he provided Vardar the honor of conquering the trophy by scoring the only and winning goal at the last minute of the game against FK Pelister.

Besides playing in Far East in South Korean K-League side Jeonbuk Hyundai Dinos between 1995 and 1998, he also played in Serbian side FK Radnički Niš.

== Honours ==
Vardar

- Macedonian First League: 1992–93, 1993–94, 1994–95
- Macedonian Cup: 1993, 1995

Cementarnica 55

- Macedonian Cup: 2003

== External sources ==
- Žanko Savov at WorldFootball.net
- Žanko Savov – K League stats at kleague.com (in Korean and English)
