= Dejan Ristovski =

Macedonian footballer

Personal information
- Full name: Dejan Ristovski; Дејан Ристовски
- Date of birth: 1 August 1973 (age 53)
- Place of birth: Skopje, SR Macedonia
- Position: Striker

Senior career*
Years	Team	Apps	(Gls)
1999–2001	Cementarnica	50	(21)
2001–2003	Vardar	65	(15)
2004–2005	Cementarnica	28	(9)
2005–2007	Vardar	36	(7)

International career^{‡}
2000	Macedonia	3	(0)
- * Club domestic league appearances and goals as of 14 August 2010 ‡ National team caps and goals as of 11 August 2010

Dejan Ristovski (born 1 August 1973) in Skopje is a former Macedonian football player.

== International career ==
He made his senior debut for Macedonia in a June 2000 friendly match against South Korea and has earned a total of 3 caps, scoring no goals. His final international was a July 2000 friendly against Azerbaijan.
