= Igor Nikolovski =

Footballer (born 1973)

Personal information
- Date of birth: 16 July 1973 (age 53)
- Place of birth: Suren, France
- Height: 1.86 m (6 ft 1 in)
- Position: Defender

Youth career
- 1982–1990: Rabotnički

Senior career*
Years	Team	Apps	(Gls)
1990–1992	Rabotnički		
1993–1996	Vardar	58	(6)
1996–1998	Royal Antwerp	58	(5)
1998–1999	Sakaryaspor	29	(3)
1999–2001	Trabzonspor	38	(0)
2001–2005	Lierse	59	(0)

International career
1995–2002	Macedonia	42	(2)
- * Club domestic league appearances and goals

Igor-Saša Nikolovski (Macedonian: Игор Николовски; born 16 July 1973) is a former professional footballer who played as a defender.

== International career ==
Born in Suren, France, Nikolovski made his debut for the Macedonia national team in 1995, and got 42 caps and 2 goals. His final international was a September 2002 European Championship qualification match against Liechtenstein.

== Career statistics ==
=== International ===
Appearances and goals by national team and year
National team	Year	Apps	Goals
Macedonia	1995	5	0
Macedonia	1996	7	0
Macedonia	1997	6	0
Macedonia	1998	8	1
Macedonia	1999	3	0
Macedonia	2000	6	0
Macedonia	2001	5	1
Macedonia	2002	2	0
Total		42	2

Scores and results list Macedonia's goal tally first, score column indicates score after each Nikolovski goal.

List of international goals scored by Igor Nikolovski
No.	Date	Venue	Opponent	Score	Result	Competition
1	18 November 1998	Ta' Qali National Stadium, Ta' Qali, Malta	Malta	1–0	2–1	UEFA Euro 2000 qualification
2	6 June 2001	Bursa Atatürk Stadium, Bursa, Turkey	Turkey	3–2	3–3	2002 FIFA World Cup qualification
