= Blagoja Kuleski =

Mcedonian footballer

Personal information
- Full name: Blagoja Kuleski
- Date of birth: 4 October 1962 (age 64)
- Place of birth: Prilep, FPR Yugoslavia
- Height: 1.84 m (6 ft 0 in)
- Position: Defender

Senior career*
Years	Team	Apps	(Gls)
1981–1985	Pobeda	80	(15)
1985–1986	Vardar	8	(0)
1987–1989	Pelister	40	(11)
1989–1992	Radnički Niš	53	(18)
1992–1994	Marconi Stallions	52	(3)
1994–1996	Melbourne Zebras	19	(0)
1997	Bulleen Lions		
2000	Rockdale City Suns		

Managerial career
- 2002: Illawarra Lions
- 2006–2009: Bonnyrigg White Eagles
- * Club domestic league appearances and goals

Blagoja Kuleski (Macedonian: Благоја Кулески; born 4 October 1962) is a Macedonian football manager and former player.

== Playing career ==
=== Club ===
Born in Prilep, SR Macedonia, back then still within Yugoslavia, Kuleski started playing in Yugoslav League for Macedonian clubs FK Pobeda, FK Vardar and FK Pelister, Serbian FK Radnički Niš, before moving to Australia, in 1992, where he played with Marconi Stallions, Melbourne Zebras, Bulleen Lions and Rockdale City Suns.

Blagoja was voted second best defender/ sweeper in 1990 in Yugoslav National League just 2 points behind Miodrag Belodedici of Red Star Belgrade who were crowned Super Cup Champions in the same year.

=== International ===
Blagoja, or Kuki, as he is better known in the football community, played the first game for Macedonia against Yugoslavia in Skopje in 1991, along the greats of Darko Pančev and Ilija Najdoski.

== Managerial career ==
After retiring in Australia, he became a football coach managing Illawarra Lions and Bonnyrigg White Eagles. He won the Championship two consecutive years with Bonnyrigg and promoted them back into the NSW Premier League in 2009.
