= Kire Grozdanov =

Macedonian retired football defender (born 1970)

Personal information
- Full name: Kire Grozdanov; Кире Грозданов
- Date of birth: 18 December 1970 (age 55)
- Place of birth: Bitola, SR Macedonia, SFR Yugoslavia
- Height: 1.74 m (5 ft 8 1/2 in)
- Position: Defender

Senior career*
Years	Team	Apps	(Gls)
1988–1994	Pelister	93	(8)
1994–1997	Vardar	18	(2)
1997–1999	Pobeda		
1999–2004	Pelister	86	(7)

International career^{‡}
1993–1998	Macedonia	7	(0)
- * Club domestic league appearances and goals as of 16 May 2009 ‡ National team caps and goals as of 16 May 2009

Kire Grozdanov (Macedonian: Кире Грозданов; born 18 December 1970) is a Macedonian retired football defender, who was last played for FK Pelister.

== Club career ==
He played for Vardar in the 1994/95 Europa League and for Pelister in the 2001/02 Europa League.

== International career ==
He made his senior debut for Macedonia in an October 1993 friendly match away against Slovenia, which was his country's first ever official match, and has earned a total of 7 caps, scoring no goals. His final international was a September 1998 friendly against Egypt.

== External sources ==
- Kire Grozdanov at National-Football-Teams.com
