= Nikola Gjoševski =

Macedonian footballer

Personal information
- Date of birth: 1 April 1979 (age 47)
- Place of birth: Skopje, Macedonia
- Height: 1.85 m (6 ft 1 in)
- Position: Left full back

Youth career
- Sileks

Senior career*
Years	Team	Apps	(Gls)
1998–2000	Sileks	90	(8)
2000–2001	Spartak Moscow	3	(0)
2001–2005	Vardar	90	(8)
2005	Austria Salzburg	11	(1)
2005–2006	FC Midtjylland	2	(0)
2006–2007	Vardar	11	(1)
2007	Ethnikos	33	(0)
2008	Rabotnički	11	(2)
2008–2009	Vardar	20	(1)
2009	Rodos	7	(0)

International career
1997–2000	Macedonia U21	12	(1)

Managerial career
- 2010–2012: Metalurg (Director)
- * Club domestic league appearances and goals

Nikola Gjoshevski (Macedonian: Никола Ѓошевски) (born 1 April 1979) is a retired Macedonian professional football player who currently works as a FIFA intermediary agent. He is the owner and CEO of the Macedonia-based football players' agency Sports Management Consulting.

== Playing career ==
=== Club ===
Gjosevski played international club level football as a left full back. During his career, he played for:

- FC Vardar Negotino (Republic of Macedonia);
- FC Makedonija Gjorce Petrov (Republic of Macedonia);
- FC Sileks Kratovo (Republic of Macedonia);
- FC Rabotnicki Skopje (Republic of Macedonia);
- FC Vardar Skopje (Republic of Macedonia);
- FC Spartak Moscow (Russia);
- FC Red Bull Salzburg (Austria);
- FC Midtjylland (Denmark);
- FC Ethnikos Pireous (Greece);
- FC Rhodos (Greece);

His most successful period in club-level football was as part of FC Vardar Skopje, after the summer of 2003 when FC Vardar Skopje nearly entered the Liga Champions groups, eliminated CSKA Moscow, and lost to Sparta Praga after only one goal advantage. After exiting Liga Champions qualifications, FC Vardar Skopje lost in a Liga Europa game against FC Roma Italy.

After a strong 2003 season and a series of notable performances for FK Vardar, Gjosevski was appointed team captain, a role he held until leaving the club to join FC Red Bull Salzburg in January 2005.

=== International ===
Gjosevski is player with the most appearances for Macedonia U-21 national team with more than 25 matches played for U-21 and been captain of U-21 Macedonia 5 games.

== Football director and agent ==
After finishing football playing career in FC Rhodos (Greece), he became Sport Director in FC Metalurg Skopje (Republic of Macedonia) from January 2010 until August 2012 providing the club second place in Macedonia League 2 years i a row and first time in the club history European games in Liga Europa.

Nikola Gjosevski football agent career starts from August 2012 opening his agency company "Sports Management Consulting".

== Personal life ==
Nikola Gjosevski graduated Economy University - Management Department in "St. Kiril and Metodij" University in Skopje in 2004.
