= Rogério Oliveira =

Brazilian footballer

Personal information
- Full name: Rogério Oliveira da Costa
- Date of birth: 10 May 1976
- Place of birth: Foz do Iguaçu, Brazil
- Date of death: 19 December 2006 (aged 30)
- Place of death: Skopje, Republic of Macedonia
- Positions: Midfielder; striker

Senior career*
Years	Team	Apps	(Gls)
–1996	Foz do Iguaçú		
1996–1997	FK Pobeda		
1998	FC Antwerp	8	(1)
1998–1999	FK Pobeda		
1999	Trabzonspor	11	(1)
2000	Vanspor	2	(0)
2000–2002	FK Rabotnički	31	(12)
2002–2004	Vardar Skopje	57	(25)
2004–2006	PAS Giannina	29	(11)
2006	Škendija	0	(0)
- * Club domestic league appearances and goals

Rogério Oliveira da Costa (10 May 1976 – 19 December 2006) was a Brazilian-born football striker. He was born in Foz do Iguaçu and became a naturalized Macedonian citizen.

== Career ==
Rogério Oliveira played for FK Pobeda, FK Rabotnički, FK Vardar and FK Shkendija 79 in Macedonia, Royal Antwerp in Belgium, Trabzonspor and Vanspor in Turkey and PAS Giannina in Greece (2004–2006). He's the first Brazilian to play in the Macedonian league, which he played in Macedonia since 1997, and acquired Macedonian citizenship shortly before his death in Skopje of a heart attack at the age of 30.

In the 1998–99 season, while playing for FK Pobeda, he was the Macedonian First League top scorer with 22 goals, and was also awarded as the best foreign player of that season by the Macedonian Football Federation. By many football fans in Macedonia, he is regarded as the best foreign player ever to have played in Macedonia.

== Death ==
Rogério Oliveira died from a heart attack on 19 December 2006, at the age of 30.
