= Risto Božinov =

Macedonian footballer

Personal information
- Date of birth: 10 April 1969 (age 57)
- Place of birth: SFR Yugoslavia
- Height: 1.80 m (5 ft 11 in)
- Position: Striker

Senior career*
Years	Team	Apps	(Gls)
1996–1998	OFI	18	(1)
1998	Sileks	0	(0)
1998–2000	FC Gütersloh	27	(5)
2000–2005	Vardar	34	(15)

International career
1998–1999	Macedonia	5	(3)
- * Club domestic league appearances and goals

Risto Božinov (Macedonian: Ристо Божинов; born 10 April 1969) is a Macedonian former professional footballer who played as a striker.

== International career ==
Božinov made his senior debut for Macedonia in a September 1998 European Championship qualification match against Malta in which he immediately scored two goals. He earned a total of five caps, scoring three goals. His final international was a June 1999 European Championship qualification match against Croatia.

== Career statistics ==
Scores and results list Macedonia's goal tally first.

#	Date	Venue	Opponent	Score	Result	Competition
1	6 September 1998	Gradski Stadion, Skopje, Macedonia	Malta	1–0	4–0	UEFA Euro 2000 qualifying
2	6 September 1998	Gradski Stadion, Skopje, Macedonia	Malta	2–0	4–0	UEFA Euro 2000 qualifying
3	5 June 1999	Gradski Stadion, Skopje, Macedonia	Croatia	1–1	1–1	UEFA Euro 2000 qualifying
