= Sašo Miloševski =

Macedonian footballer

Personal information
- Full name: Sašo Miloševski; Сашо Милошевски
- Date of birth: 27 April 1968 (age 58)
- Place of birth: Bitola, SR Macedonia, SFR Yugoslavia
- Position: Midfielder

Team information
- Current team: Vardar (Yyouth team coordinator)

Senior career*
| Years | Team | Apps | (Gls) |
| 1988–1989 | Vardar | 3 | (0) |
| 1989–1991 | Pelister | 67 | (17) |
| 1991–1995 | Vardar | 18 | (2) |
| 1995–1998 | Vojvodina | 66 | (16) |
| 1998–1999 | Tiburones Rojos | 11 | (1) |
| 1999–2002 | Rabotnički | 79 | (20) |

International career
| 1993–1997 | Macedonia | 10 | (1) |

Managerial career
- 2002–2008: Rabotnički (Technical Director)
- 2008–2009: Vardar (Technical Director)
- 2013–: Vardar (Youth team coordinator)
- * Club domestic league appearances and goals

Sašo Miloševski (Macedonian Cyrillic: Сашо Милошевски; born 27 April 1968) is a retired Macedonian international football player. He used to play as a midfielder.

== Club career ==
After playing in the main Macedonian clubs, FK Vardar and FK Pelister, in 1995 he signed for the Serbian side FK Vojvodina, where he had an important role and get to be the captain of the team. After impressive three seasons, he was one of the few Macedonian footballers to emigrate to Mexico and play in Veracruz. After one season he was back to FK Rabotnički where he finished his playing career.

== National team ==
He played in the first ever official match of Macedonia, played on 13 October 1993, against Slovenia. Ever since, Sašo Miloševski played 10 matches scoring once for the Macedonian national team between 1993 and 1998. His final international was an August 1997 FIFA World Cup qualification match against Romania.

== Honours ==
- FK Vardar
  - 3 times Macedonian First Football League Champion: 1992–93, 1993–94 and 1994–95
  - 2 times Macedonian Football Cup winner: 1993 and 1995
