= Srgjan Zaharievski =

Macedonian footballer (born 1973)

Personal information
- Date of birth: 12 September 1973 (age 53)
- Place of birth: Kriva Palanka, SR Macedonia, Yugoslavia
- Height: 1.77 m (5 ft 10 in)
- Position: Midfielder

Youth career
- Osogovo
- Sileks

Senior career*
Years	Team	Apps	(Gls)
1994–1998	Sileks	21	(0)
1999–2000	VfB Stuttgart II	1	(0)
2000–2001	Campomaiorense	8	(0)
2001–2004	Vardar	98	(19)
2004–2005	Doxa Drama	24	(4)
2005–2006	Rhodos	15	(1)
2006–2009	Anagennisi Karditsa	80	(8)
2009–2011	Teteks	53	(4)
2011–2012	Metalurg Skopje	5	(0)

International career^{‡}
1996–2002	Macedonia	22	(3)

Managerial career
- 2012–2015: Metalurg Skopje
- 2017: Pelister
- 2020–2023: Struga
- 2024: Voska Sport
- 2024: Vardar
- 2024: Pelister
- * Club domestic league appearances and goals as of 4 May 2013 ‡ National team caps and goals as of 31 July 2008

Srgjan Zaharievski or Srǵan Zaharievski (Macedonian: Срѓан Захариевски; born 12 September 1973) is a Macedonian football manager and former player who played as a midfielder.

== Club career ==
Zaharievski began his career with FK Sileks. He once was on the books of German side VfB Stuttgart and also had a spell with S.C. Campomaiorense in the Portuguese Liga.

== International career ==
Zaharievski made his senior debut for Macedonia in a March 1996 friendly match against Malta and has earned a total of 22 caps, scoring 3 goals. His final international was a March 2002 friendly against Bosnia & Herzegovina.

== Managerial career ==
Zaharievski was appointed coach of Pelister Bitola in summer 2017.

== Career statistics ==
#	Date	Venue	Opponent	Score	Result	Competition
1.	24 April 1996	Gradski Stadion, Skopje, Macedonia	Liechtenstein	3–0	Win	1998 World Cup qualifying
2.	29 September 1998	Gradski Stadion, Kumanovo, Macedonia	Egypt	2–2	Draw	Friendly
3.	18 November 1998	Ta' Qali National Stadium, Ta' Qali, Malta	Malta	1–5	Win	Euro 2000 qualifying
Correct as of 13 January 2017

== Honours ==
FK Sileks Kratovo

- Macedonian First League: 1996, 1997
- Macedonian Cup: 1994, 1997

VfB Stuttgart II

- Oberliga Baden-Württemberg: 1998
- Württemberg Cup: 2000

FK Vardar Skopje

- Macedonian First League: 2002, 2003

FK Teteks Tetovo

- Macedonian Cup: 2010
