= 2002–03 Macedonian First Football League =

Macedonian First League
- Season: 2002–03
- Dates: 10 August 2002 – 1 June 2003
- Champions: Vardar; 5th Macedonian title 6th domestic title
- Relegated: Pelister; Kumanovo
- Champions League: Vardar
- UEFA Cup: Belasica; Cementarnica
- Intertoto Cup: Pobeda
- Matches played: 198
- Goals scored: 540 (2.73 per match)
- Top goalscorer: Ljubiša Savić (25 goals)
- Biggest home win: Belasica 6–0 Pelister (20 March 2003); Cementarnica 6–0 Kumanovo (21 May 2003)
- Biggest away win: Kumanovo 0–4 Cementarnica (3 November 2002)
- Highest scoring: Pelister 3–6 Sloga J. (21 May 2003)

The 2002–03 Macedonian First League was the 11th season of the Macedonian First Football League, the highest football league of Macedonia. The first matches of the season were played on 10 August 2002 and the last on 1 June 2003. Vardar defended their championship title, having won their fifth title, second in a row.

== Promotion and relegation ==
At the start of the 2002–03 season

Promoted from 2001–02 Second League

- Tikvesh (winners)
- Bregalnica Delchevo (runners-up)

Relegated to 2002–03 Second League

- Makedonija G.P. (11th)
- Osogovo (12th)

At the end of the 2002–03 season

Promoted from 2002–03 Second League

- Bashkimi (winners)
- Madjari Solidarnost (runners-up)

Relegated to 2003–04 Second League

- Pelister (11th)
- Kumanovo (12th)

== Participating teams ==
Location of teams in 2002–03 Macedonian First League

Club	City	Stadium
Belasica Geras Cunev	Strumica	Stadion Mladost
Bregalnica	Delchevo	Gradski stadion Goce Delchev
Cementarnica 55	Skopje	Stadion Cementarnica
Kumanovo	Kumanovo	Gradski stadion Kumanovo
Napredok	Kichevo	Gradski stadion Kichevo
Pelister	Bitola	Stadion Tumbe Kafe
Pobeda	Prilep	Stadion Goce Delchev
Rabotnichki Kometal	Skopje	Gradski stadion Skopje
Sileks	Kratovo	Stadion Sileks
Sloga Jugomagnat	Skopje	Chair Stadium
Tikvesh	Kavadarci	Gradski stadion Kavadarci
Vardar	Skopje	Gradski stadion Skopje

== League table ==
Pos	Team	Pld	W	D	L	GF	GA	GD	Pts	Qualification or relegation
1	Vardar (C)	33	22	6	5	73	37	+36	72	Qualification for the Champions League first qualifying round
2	Belasica	33	20	9	4	50	32	+18	69	Qualification for the UEFA Cup qualifying round
3	Pobeda	33	20	5	8	55	33	+22	65	Qualification for the Intertoto Cup first round
4	Rabotnichki Kometal	33	16	6	11	41	35	+6	54	
5	Sloga Jugomagnat	33	15	6	12	62	50	+12	51	
6	Sileks	33	14	4	15	40	35	+5	46	
7	Napredok	33	13	3	17	39	41	−2	42 (Note: Head-to-head record: Napredok: 7 pts, Cementarnica 55: 1 pts.)	
8	Cementarnica 55	33	11	9	13	45	39	+6	42	Qualification for the UEFA Cup qualifying round (Note: Cementarnica 55 qualified for the UEFA Cup qualifying round by winning the 2002–03 Macedonian Football Cup.)
9	Tikvesh	33	11	4	18	37	58	−21	37	
10	Bregalnica Delchevo	33	10	6	17	44	49	−5	36	
11	Pelister (R)	33	7	7	19	30	60	−30	28	Relegation to the Macedonian Second League
12	Kumanovo (R)	33	4	5	24	24	71	−47	17	Relegation to the Macedonian Second League

Source: MacedonianFootball.com, RSSSF.org
Rules for classification: 1) Points; 2) Goal difference; 3) Goals scored; 4) Head-to-head points; 5) Head-to-head goal difference; 6) Head-to-head away goals scored (only if two teams); 7) Head-to-head goals scored; 8) Draw; 9) Play-off. (Note: Criteria 2, 3 and 8 is only used if not deciding Champion, teams for UEFA competitions or relegation).
(C) Champions; (R) Relegated

== Results ==
Every team will play three times against each other team for a total of 33 matches. The first 22 matchdays will consist of a regular double round-robin schedule. The league standings at this point will then be used to determine the games for the last 11 matchdays.

Home \ Away	BEL	BRD	CEM	KUM	NAP	PEL	POB	RAB	SIL	SLO	TIK	VAR	BEL	BRD	CEM	KUM	NAP	PEL	POB	RAB	SIL	SLO	TIK	VAR
Belasica	—	2–1	3–2	1–0	1–0	1–0	2–0	1–0	2–1	1–0	4–2	3–2	—	1–1	—	—	—	6–0	—	—	3–1	4–3	1–0	1–0
Bregalnica Delchevo	0–1	—	1–1	3–2	2–1	3–0 (Note: Match awarded)	1–1	1–1	1–0	5–2	0–1	0–1	—	—	3–2	—	2–1	—	—	—	3–1	2–4	—	0–1
Cementarnica 55	1–1	1–0	—	2–1	0–1	1–2	1–1	3–0	3–0	2–4	0–2	1–1	2–0	—	—	6–0	—	1–0	0–1	2–0	—	—	—	—
Kumanovo	1–1	0–0	0–4	—	1–0	0–0	0–2	0–1	0–1	2–1	1–2	2–4	0–3	2–4	—	—	—	2–0	1–2	1–3	—	—	—	—
Napredok	0–1	2–1	1–1	1–0	—	4–1	2–1	0–0	2–1	5–0	0–1	3–1	0–1	—	0–0	4–2	—	—	1–2	0–2	—	—	—	—
Pelister	1–1	3–1	1–0	1–0	1–2	—	1–1	1–0	0–1	0–0	3–2	1–2	—	2–2	—	—	0–2	—	—	—	0–3	3–6	—	0–2
Pobeda	4–0	4–3	2–1	0–2	2–1	1–0	—	1–0	2–0	3–1	2–1	3–1	6–1	1–0	—	—	—	1–1	—	—	2–1	2–1	3–0	—
Rabotnichki	1–0	1–0	2–0	4–1	1–0	2–0	0–0	—	1–0	1–4	3–1	1–2	1–1	1–0	—	—	—	3–1	0–2	—	—	1–2	4–1	—
Sileks	1–1	1–0	1–1	3–0	3–0	1–0	1–0	4–1	—	1–0	3–0	1–3	—	—	0–1	3–1	2–0	—	—	0–2	—	—	2–0	0–1
Sloga Jugomagnat	0–0	2–0	0–0	0–0	1–0	3–3	2–0	1–1	1–0	—	5–1	2–1	—	—	3–1	3–0	2–3	—	—	—	2–1	—	3–0	2–3
Tikvesh	1–1	0–1	4–2	2–0	2–0	1–2	1–0	0–2	1–1	2–1	—	1–1	—	4–2	0–1	0–0	0–1	2–0	—	—	—	—	—	—
Vardar	0–0	2–1	1–1	5–2	3–0	3–1	2–0	4–0	1–1	2–1	3–0	—	—	—	2–1	5–1	3–2	—	4–3	1–1	—	—	6–2	—

Source: RSSSF.org
Legend: Blue = home team win; Yellow = draw; Red = away team win.

== Top goalscorers ==
Rank	Player	Club	Goals
1	(North Macedonia) Ljubiša Savić	Bregalnica Delchevo & Sloga Jugomagnat	25
2	(North Macedonia) Zoran Baldovaliev	Belasica	21
3	(North Macedonia) Vasko Georgiev	Napredok & Bregalnica Delchevo	15
3	(Brazil) Rogério Oliveira	Vardar	15
3	(North Macedonia) Antonio Tasev	Tikvesh	15
6	(North Macedonia) Dragan Dimitrovski	Napredok & Pobeda	13
7	(Bulgaria) Mario Petkov	Vardar	12
8	(North Macedonia) Goran Stankovski	Sloga Jugomagnat	11
9	(North Macedonia) Bojan Dimitrievski	Sileks	10

Source: rsssf.org

== See also ==
- 2002–03 Macedonian Football Cup
- 2002–03 Macedonian Second Football League
