= 2026 FIFA World Cup qualification – UEFA Group J =

Association football tournament group

The 2026 FIFA World Cup qualification UEFA Group J was one of the twelve UEFA groups in the World Cup qualification tournament to decide which teams would qualify for the 2026 FIFA World Cup final tournament in Canada, Mexico and the United States. Group J consisted of five teams: Belgium, Kazakhstan, Liechtenstein, North Macedonia and Wales. The teams played against each other home-and-away in a round-robin format from March to November 2025. However, as Belgium were involved in the Nations League promotion/relegation play-offs in March, they began their qualifying campaign in June 2025.

The group winners, Belgium, qualified directly for the World Cup finals, while the runners-up, Wales, advanced to the second round (play-offs). In addition, North Macedonia advanced to the play-offs via their Nations League ranking.

== Standings ==
Pos	Team	Pld	W	D	L	GF	GA	GD	Pts	Qualification	(Belgium)	(Wales)	(North Macedonia)	(Kazakhstan)	(Liechtenstein)
1	Belgium	8	5	3	0	29	7	+22	18	Qualification for 2026 FIFA World Cup	—	4–3	0–0	6–0	7–0
2	Wales	8	5	1	2	21	11	+10	16	Advance to play-offs	2–4	—	7–1	3–1	3–0
3	North Macedonia	8	3	4	1	13	10	+3	13	Advance to play-offs via Nations League	1–1	1–1	—	1–1	5–0
4	Kazakhstan	8	2	2	4	9	13	−4	8		1–1	0–1	0–1	—	4–0
5	Liechtenstein	8	0	0	8	0	31	−31	0		0–6	0–1	0–3	0–2	—

Source: FIFA, UEFA
Rules for classification: Tiebreakers

== Matches ==
The fixture list was confirmed by UEFA on 13 December 2024 following the draw. Times are CET/CEST, (Note: CET (UTC+1) for matches until 29 March and from 26 October (matchday 1–2 and 9–10), and CEST (UTC+2) for matches from 30 March to 25 October 2025 (matchday 3–8).) as listed by UEFA (local times, if different, are in parentheses).

22 March 2025
15:00

Liechtenstein	0–3	North Macedonia
	Report (FIFA); Report (UEFA)	Trajkovski 7'; Musliu 42'; Miovski 84'

Rheinpark Stadion, Vaduz
Attendance: 4,094
Referee: Mykola Balakin (Ukraine)
22 March 2025
20:45 (19:45 UTC+0)

Wales	3–1	Kazakhstan
D. James 9'; B. Davies 47'; Matondo 90'	Report (FIFA); Report (UEFA)	Tagybergen 32' (pen.)

Cardiff City Stadium, Cardiff
Attendance: 32,473
Referee: Donatas Rumšas (Lithuania)

25 March 2025
20:45

Liechtenstein	0–2	Kazakhstan
	Report (FIFA); Report (UEFA)	Samorodov 42'; Marochkin 45'

Rheinpark Stadion, Vaduz
Attendance: 1,123
Referee: John Beaton (Scotland)
25 March 2025
20:45

North Macedonia	1–1	Wales
Miovski 90+1'	Report (FIFA); Report (UEFA)	Brooks 90+6'

Toše Proeski Arena, Skopje
Attendance: 23,114
Referee: Jérôme Brisard (France)

6 June 2025
20:45

North Macedonia	1–1	Belgium
Alioski 86'	Report (FIFA); Report (UEFA)	De Cuyper 28'

Toše Proeski Arena, Skopje
Attendance: 23,070
Referee: Chris Kavanagh (England)
6 June 2025
20:45 (19:45 UTC+1)

Wales	3–0	Liechtenstein
Rodon 39'; Wilson 65'; Moore 68'	Report (FIFA); Report (UEFA)

Cardiff City Stadium, Cardiff
Attendance: 30,646
Referee: Anastasios Papapetrou (Greece)

9 June 2025
16:00 (19:00 UTC+5)

Kazakhstan	0–1	North Macedonia
	Report (FIFA); Report (UEFA)	Trajkovski 33'

Astana Arena, Astana
Attendance: 27,694
Referee: Filip Glova (Slovakia)
9 June 2025
20:45

Belgium	4–3	Wales
Lukaku 15' (pen.); Tielemans 19'; Doku 27'; De Bruyne 88'	Report (FIFA); Report (UEFA)	Wilson 45+7' (pen.); Thomas 51'; Johnson 70'

King Baudouin Stadium, Brussels
Attendance: 33,653
Referee: Irfan Peljto (Bosnia and Herzegovina)

4 September 2025
16:00 (19:00 UTC+5)

Kazakhstan	0–1	Wales
	Report (FIFA); Report (UEFA)	Moore 24'

Astana Arena, Astana
Attendance: 28,219
Referee: Alejandro Hernández Hernández (Spain)
4 September 2025
20:45

Liechtenstein	0–6	Belgium
	Report (FIFA); Report (UEFA)	De Cuyper 29'; Tielemans 46', 70' (pen.); Theate 60'; De Bruyne 62'; Fofana 90+1'

Rheinpark Stadion, Vaduz
Attendance: 3,158
Referee: Morten Krogh (Denmark)

7 September 2025
18:00

North Macedonia	5–0	Liechtenstein
B. Büchel 15' (o.g.); Bardhi 52'; Churlinov 56'; Qamili 82'; Stankovski 90'	Report (FIFA); Report (UEFA)

Toše Proeski Arena, Skopje
Attendance: 8,693
Referee: Horațiu Feșnic (Romania)
7 September 2025
20:45

Belgium	6–0	Kazakhstan
De Bruyne 42', 84'; Doku 44', 60'; Raskin 51'; Meunier 87'	Report (FIFA); Report (UEFA)

Constant Vanden Stock Stadium, Anderlecht
Attendance: 15,119
Referee: Radu Petrescu (Romania)

10 October 2025
16:00 (19:00 UTC+5)

Kazakhstan	4–0	Liechtenstein
Kenzhebek 26', 59'; Zainutdinov 28'; Kasym 81'	Report (FIFA); Report (UEFA)

Astana Arena, Astana
Attendance: 26,539
Referee: Paweł Raczkowski (Poland)
10 October 2025
20:45

Belgium	0–0	North Macedonia
	Report (FIFA); Report (UEFA)

Planet Group Arena, Ghent
Attendance: 18,583
Referee: Halil Umut Meler (Turkey)

13 October 2025
20:45

North Macedonia	1–1	Kazakhstan
Bardhi 74'	Report (FIFA); Report (UEFA)	Karaman 54'

Toše Proeski Arena, Skopje
Attendance: 19,929
Referee: Juan Martínez Munuera (Spain)
13 October 2025
20:45 (19:45 UTC+1)

Wales	2–4	Belgium
Rodon 8'; Broadhead 89'	Report (FIFA); Report (UEFA)	De Bruyne 18' (pen.), 76' (pen.); Meunier 24'; Trossard 90'

Cardiff City Stadium, Cardiff
Attendance: 32,803
Referee: Daniel Siebert (Germany)

15 November 2025
15:00 (19:00 UTC+5)

Kazakhstan	1–1	Belgium
Satpayev 9'	Report (FIFA); Report (UEFA)	Vanaken 48'

Astana Arena, Astana
Attendance: 28,012
Referee: Donatas Rumšas (Lithuania)
15 November 2025
18:00

Liechtenstein	0–1	Wales
	Report (FIFA); Report (UEFA)	James 61'

Rheinpark Stadion, Vaduz
Attendance: 5,563
Referee: Juxhin Xhaja (Albania)

18 November 2025
20:45

Belgium	7–0	Liechtenstein
Vanaken 3'; Doku 34', 41'; Mechele 52'; Saelemaekers 55'; De Ketelaere 57', 59'	Report (FIFA); Report (UEFA)

Stade Maurice Dufrasne, Liège
Attendance: 26,253
Referee: Mohammed Al-Hakim (Sweden)
18 November 2025
20:45 (19:45 UTC+0)

Wales	7–1	North Macedonia
Wilson 18' (pen.), 75', 81' (pen.); Brooks 21'; Johnson 37'; James 57'; Broadhead 88'	Report (FIFA); Report (UEFA)	Miovski 23'

Cardiff City Stadium, Cardiff
Attendance: 32,154
Referee: Danny Makkelie (Netherlands)

== Goalscorers ==
There were 72 goals scored in 20 matches, for an average of 3.6 goals per match.

6 goals

- (Belgium) Kevin De Bruyne

5 goals

- (Belgium) Jérémy Doku
- (Wales) Harry Wilson

3 goals

- (Belgium) Youri Tielemans
- (North Macedonia) Bojan Miovski

2 goals

- (Belgium) Maxim De Cuyper
- (Belgium) Charles De Ketelaere
- (Belgium) Thomas Meunier
- (Belgium) Hans Vanaken
- (Kazakhstan) Galymzhan Kenzhebek
- (North Macedonia) Enis Bardhi
- (North Macedonia) Aleksandar Trajkovski
- (Wales) Nathan Broadhead
- (Wales) David Brooks
- (Wales) Daniel James
- (Wales) Brennan Johnson
- (Wales) Kieffer Moore
- (Wales) Joe Rodon

1 goal

- (Belgium) Malick Fofana
- (Belgium) Romelu Lukaku
- (Belgium) Brandon Mechele
- (Belgium) Nicolas Raskin
- (Belgium) Alexis Saelemaekers
- (Belgium) Arthur Theate
- (Belgium) Leandro Trossard
- (Kazakhstan) Dinmukhamed Karaman
- (Kazakhstan) Alibek Kasym
- (Kazakhstan) Aleksandr Marochkin
- (Kazakhstan) Maksim Samorodov
- (Kazakhstan) Dastan Satpayev
- (Kazakhstan) Askhat Tagybergen
- (Kazakhstan) Bakhtiyar Zaynutdinov
- (North Macedonia) Ezgjan Alioski
- (North Macedonia) Darko Churlinov
- (North Macedonia) Visar Musliu
- (North Macedonia) Lirim Qamili
- (North Macedonia) Luka Stankovski
- (Wales) Ben Davies
- (Wales) Jordan James
- (Wales) Rabbi Matondo
- (Wales) Sorba Thomas

1 own goal

- (Liechtenstein) Benjamin Büchel (against North Macedonia)

== Discipline ==
A player or team official was automatically suspended for the next match for the following offences:

- Receiving a red card (red card suspensions could be extended for serious offences)
- Receiving two yellow cards in two different matches (yellow card suspensions were carried forward to the play-offs, but not the finals or any other future international matches)

The following suspensions were served during the qualifying matches:

Team	Player	Offence(s)	Suspended for match(es)
Belgium	Thomas Meunier	(yellow card) vs North Macedonia (6 June 2025); (yellow card) vs Wales (13 October 2025)	vs Kazakhstan (15 November 2025)
Belgium	Rudi Garcia (manager)	(yellow card) vs Wales (9 June 2025); (yellow card) vs Wales (13 October 2025)	vs Kazakhstan (15 November 2025)
Kazakhstan	Serhiy Malyi	(yellow card) vs North Macedonia (9 June 2025); (yellow card) vs Wales (4 September 2025)	vs Belgium (7 September 2025)
Kazakhstan	Maksim Samorodov	(yellow card) vs Wales (22 March 2025); (yellow card) vs Liechtenstein (10 October 2025)	vs North Macedonia (13 October 2025)
Kazakhstan	Islambek Kuat	(yellow card) vs North Macedonia (9 June 2025); (yellow card) vs North Macedonia (13 October 2025)	vs Belgium (15 November 2025)
Kazakhstan	Bakhtiyar Zaynutdinov	(yellow card) vs Liechtenstein (10 October 2025); (yellow card) vs North Macedonia (13 October 2025)	vs Belgium (15 November 2025)
Liechtenstein	Felix Oberwaditzer	(yellow card) vs Kazakhstan (25 March 2025); (yellow card) vs North Macedonia (7 September 2025)	vs Kazakhstan (10 October 2025)
Liechtenstein	Jens Hofer	(yellow card) vs North Macedonia (22 March 2025); (yellow card) vs Kazakhstan (10 October 2025)	vs Wales (15 November 2025)
North Macedonia	Nikola Serafimov	(yellow card) vs Liechtenstein (22 March 2025); (yellow card) vs Wales (25 March 2025)	vs Belgium (6 June 2025)
North Macedonia	Blagoja Milevski (manager)	(yellow card) vs Wales (25 March 2025); (yellow card) vs Belgium (6 June 2025)	vs Kazakhstan (9 June 2025)
North Macedonia	Visar Musliu	(yellow card) vs Belgium (6 June 2025); (yellow card) vs Kazakhstan (9 June 2025)	vs Liechtenstein (7 September 2025)
North Macedonia	Bojan Ilievski	(yellow card) vs Belgium (6 June 2025); (yellow card) vs Liechtenstein (7 September 2025)	vs Belgium (10 October 2025)
Wales	Harry Wilson	(yellow card) vs Belgium (9 June 2025); (yellow card) vs Belgium (13 October 2025)	vs Liechtenstein (15 November 2025)
Wales	Ethan Ampadu	(yellow card) vs Belgium (9 June 2025); (yellow card) vs Liechtenstein (15 November 2025)	vs North Macedonia (18 November 2025)
Wales	Jordan James	(yellow card) vs North Macedonia (25 March 2025); (yellow card) vs Liechtenstein (15 November 2025)	vs North Macedonia (18 November 2025)
