= Lirim Qamili =

Macedonian footballer (born 1998)

Personal information
- Date of birth: 4 June 1998 (age 28)
- Place of birth: Glostrup, Denmark
- Height: 1.91 m (6 ft 3 in)
- Position: Right winger

Team information
- Current team: Sønderjyske
- Number: 15

Youth career
- Glostrup
- –2016: Frem
- 2016–2017: Hvidovre

Senior career*
Years	Team	Apps	(Gls)
2017–2020	Hvidovre	70	(14)
2020–2022	Horsens	59	(5)
2023–2024	Hvidovre	44	(11)
2024–	Sønderjyske	51	(16)

International career^{‡}
2024–	North Macedonia	14	(2)
- * Club domestic league appearances and goals as of 19 May 2026 ‡ National team caps and goals as of 1 April 2026

Lirim Qamili (born 4 June 1998) is a professional footballer who plays as a winger for Sønderjyske. Born in Denmark, he represents the North Macedonia national football team.

== Club career ==
In 2020, Qamili joined Danish Superliga club AC Horsens.

On 24 December 2022, Qamili returned to his former club Hvidovre. On 10 August 2024, newly promoted Danish Superliga club Sønderjyske confirmed that they had bought Qamili, who signed a contract until June 2027. The very next day, Qamili made his debut for Sønderjyske in a match against F.C. Copenhagen.

== International career ==
Born in Denmark, Qamili is of Albanian and Macedonian descent. He was called up to the Albania U21s for a set of friendlies in October 2020.

He was called up to the North Macedonia national team in March 2024.

== Career statistics ==
=== Club ===
As of match played 18 May 2025

Appearances and goals by club, season and competition
Club	Season	League			National Cup		Europe		Other		Total	
Club	Season	Division	Apps	Goals	Apps	Goals	Apps	Goals	Apps	Goals	Apps	Goals
Hvidovre	2017–18	Danish 2nd Division	16	1	0	0	—		—		16	1
Hvidovre	2018–19	Danish 1st Division	27	3	1	0	—		—		28	3
Hvidovre	2019–20	Danish 1st Division	27	10	3	1	—		—		30	11
Hvidovre	Total		70	14	4	1	0	0	0	0	74	15
Horsens	2020–21	Danish 1st Division	25	2	3	1	—		—		28	3
Horsens	2021–22	Danish 1st Division	27	3	4	5	—		—		31	8
Horsens	2022–23	Danish Superliga	7	0	3	1	—		—		10	1
Horsens	Total		59	5	10	7	0	0	0	0	69	12
Hvidovre	2022–23	Danish 1st Division	13	4	0	0	—		—		13	4
Hvidovre	2023–24	Danish Superliga	28	6	2	0	—		—		30	6
Hvidovre	2024–25	Danish 1st Division	3	1	1	0	—		—		4	1
Hvidovre	Total		44	11	3	0	0	0	0	0	47	11
Sønderjyske	2024–25	Danish Superliga	26	11	2	1	—		—		28	12
Career total			199	41	19	9	0	0	0	0	218	50

== International goals ==
Scores and results list North Macedonia's goal tally first, score column indicates score after each Qamili goal.

No.	Date	Venue	Opponent	Score	Result	Competition
1.	10 October 2024	Skonto Stadium, Riga, Latvia	Latvia	2–0	3–0	2024–25 UEFA Nations League
2.	7 September 2025	Toše Proeski Arena, Skopje, North Macedonia	Liechtenstein	4–0	5–0	2026 FIFA World Cup qualification
