= Luka Stankovski =

Macedonian footballer (born 2002)

Personal information
- Date of birth: 2 September 2002 (age 24)
- Place of birth: Skopje, Macedonia
- Height: 1.90 m (6 ft 3 in)
- Position: Midfielder

Team information
- Current team: Kolos Kovalivka
- Number: 10

Youth career
- 2014–2015: Vardar
- 2015–2019: Rabotnički

Senior career*
| Years | Team | Apps | (Gls) |
| 2019–2022 | Rabotnički | 48 | (11) |
| 2022–2025 | Gaziantep | 11 | (1) |
| 2023 | → Gorica (loan) | 10 | (2) |
| 2024 | → Tuzlaspor (loan) | 13 | (1) |
| 2024–2025 | → Radnički 1923 (loan) | 27 | (3) |
| 2025–2026 | Radnički 1923 | 13 | (0) |
| 2026– | Kolos Kovalivka | 6 | (0) |

International career^{‡}
| 2018 | Macedonia U17 | 2 | (0) |
| 2021–2024 | North Macedonia U21 | 13 | (1) |
| 2025– | North Macedonia | 7 | (1) |
- * Club domestic league appearances and goals as of 2 June 2026 ‡ National team caps and goals as of 13 November 2026

Luka Stankovski (Macedonian: Лука Станковски; born 2 September 2002) is a Macedonian professional footballer who plays as a midfielder for Ukrainian Premier League club Kolos and the North Macedonia national team.

== Club career ==
=== Rabotnički ===
Born in Skopje, Macedonia, Stankovski began his youth career at Vardar, before moving to Rabotnički in 2015. He made his senior debut in the Macedonian First League on 31 August 2019, playing as a starter in a 2–1 defeat to Akademija Pandev.

At the age of 17 on 29 August 2020, Stankovski scored his first goal in a 1–1 draw against Vardar. On 16 December, he scored a brace against Borec in a 2–1 victory. Stanskovski finished the 2020–21 season with eight goals in 29 league appearances.

Despite having signed a pre-contract with Serie B club Monza in 2021, the transfer eventually fell through as the club did not achieve promotion to Serie A and he lacked an EU passport.

=== Gaziantep ===
On 12 January 2022, Stankovski joined Turkish Süper Lig club Gaziantep, signing a four-and-a-half-year contract, with an option for a further year. The transfer was reportedly worth €600,000. He made his debut in a 2–0 league defeat against İstanbul Başakşehir on 12 February 2022.

In February 2023, Stankovski moved to Slovenian PrvaLiga club Gorica on a temporary loan, as Gaziantep withdrew from the 2022–23 Süper Lig season due to the 2023 Turkey–Syria earthquake. On 6 February 2024, he joined TFF 1. Lig club Tuzlaspor on loan.

=== Radnički 1923 ===
On 17 September 2024, Stankovski was sent on loan to Radnički 1923 in the Serbian SuperLiga. He made 29 appearances in all competitions and scored three goals in 2024–25. Following the loan, Radnički 1923 signed him from Gaziantep permanently for a fee of €30,000 in June 2025.

== International career ==
Stankovski represented North Macedonia internationally at under-17 and under-21 levels. In March 2025, he received his first call-up to the senior team ahead of 2026 FIFA World Cup qualification matches against Liechtenstein and Wales. The same year on 4 September, Stankovski made his senior debut as starter in a 2–1 friendly defeat against Saudi Arabia. Three days later, on 7 September, he scored his first international goal in a 5–0 win against Liechtenstein in the 2026 FIFA World Cup qualification.

== Style of play ==
At 1.90 m (6 ft 3 in) tall, Stankovski primarily plays as a central midfielder, but can also be deployed as a holding midfielder or as an attacking midfielder.

== Personal life ==
He is the son of former footballer Goran Stankovski.

== Career statistics ==
=== Club ===
As of 16 February 2023

Appearances and goals by club, season and competition
| Club | Season | League | | | National cup (Note: Includes Macedonian Cup, Turkish Cup) | | Total | |
| Club | Season | Division | Apps | Goals | Apps | Goals | Apps | Goals |
|---|---|---|---|---|---|---|---|---|
| Rabotnički | 2019–20 | Macedonian First League | 1 | 0 | — | | 1 | 0 |
| Rabotnički | 2020–21 | Macedonian First League | 29 | 8 | — | | 29 | 8 |
| Rabotnički | 2021–22 | Macedonian First League | 18 | 3 | — | | 18 | 3 |
| Rabotnički | Total | | 48 | 11 | 0 | 0 | 48 | 11 |
| Gaziantep | 2021–22 | Süper Lig | 4 | 1 | 0 | 0 | 4 | 1 |
| Gaziantep | 2022–23 | Süper Lig | 5 | 0 | 2 | 0 | 7 | 0 |
| Gaziantep | Total | | 9 | 1 | 2 | 0 | 11 | 1 |
| Career total | | | 57 | 12 | 2 | 0 | 59 | 12 |

=== International ===
Scores and results list Templatonia's goal tally first, score column indicates score after each Stankovski goal.

List of international goals scored by Luka Stankovski
| No. | Date | Venue | Opponent | Score | Result | Competition |
|---|---|---|---|---|---|---|
| 1 | 7 September 2025 | Toše Proeski Arena, Skopje, North Macedonia | Liechtenstein | 5–0 | 5–0 | 2026 FIFA World Cup qualification |
