= Gjoko Hadžievski =

Macedonian footballer and manager

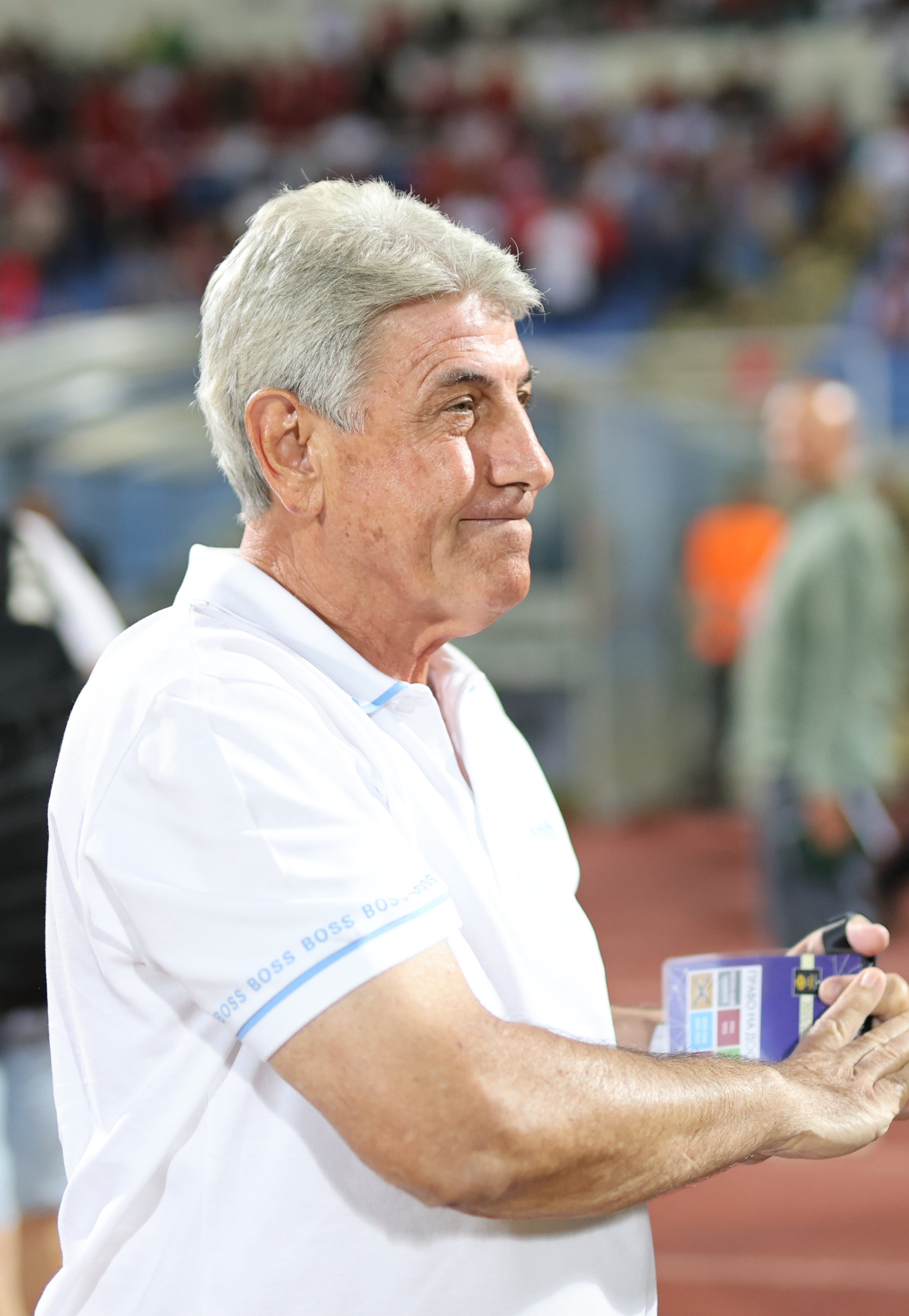

Personal information
- Full name: Gjokica Hadžievski
- Date of birth: 31 March 1955 (age 71)
- Place of birth: Bitola, PR Macedonia, FPR Yugoslavia

Senior career*
Years	Team	Apps	(Gls)
1971–1973	Karaorman		
- Teteks
- Pelister

Managerial career
- 1988–1990: Pelister
- 1991–1993: Vardar
- 1993–1994: CSKA Sofia
- 1994–1995: Vardar
- 1995–1996: Vojvodina
- 1996–1999: Macedonia
- 1998–1999: Sileks
- 2000: Júbilo Iwata
- 2001–2003: Vardar
- 2003–2004: Kastoria
- 2004–2005: Doxa Drama
- 2005–2006: Kastoria
- 2006: Niki Volos
- 2006: Vihren Sandanski
- 2006–2007: Ethnikos Piraeus
- 2007–2009: FC Baku
- 2007–2008: Azerbaijan
- 2009–2010: Atromitos
- 2010–2011: Simurq
- 2011–2012: Najran
- 2012–2013: Al Taawoun
- 2013–2014: Najran
- 2014: Al Qadsiah
- 2014–2015: Pelister
- 2016–2017: Hatta
- 2018: Al Dhafra
- 2019: Belasica
- 2019–2021: Emirates
- 2021–2022: Hajer
- 2022: Hatta
- 2023: Najran
- 2023–2024: Hajer
- 2025–2026: Spartak Varna
- * Club domestic league appearances and goals

Gjoko Hadžievski (Macedonian: Ѓоко Хаџиевски; born 31 March 1955) is a Macedonian professional football coach.

He coached teams from Bulgaria (CSKA Sofia, Vihren Sandanski, Spartak Varna), Greece (Kastoria, Doxa Drama), Azerbaijan (FC Baku), Japan (Júbilo Iwata), Saudi Arabia (Najran SC), and North Macedonia.

== Playing career ==
He played for Teteks and Pelister.

== Managerial career ==
Hadžievski started his coaching career at FK Pelister.

He resigned as coach for FK Vardar in summer 2003, and Zoran Stratev took his position.

Between March 2004 and December 2005, he was the coach of Doxa Drama.

Between August 2006 and February 2007, he was the coach of Vihren Sandanski.

Hadžievski was hired as coach of FC Baku in summer 2007.

On 31 October 2007, he was named as caretaker coach of Azerbaijan, as Shahin Diniyev resigned.

He won the Azerbaijan Premier League title with FC Baku in 2009.

In December 2014, Hadžievski again become a coach of FK Pelister, but in May 2015, after a relegation of Pelister from the Macedonian First League, Hadžievski was resigned as a coach.

On 30 September 2023, Hadžievski once again became the manager of Saudi club Hajer.

== Honours ==
- Macedonian First League: 5
  - Winner: 1993, 1994, 1995, 2002 and 2003
- Yugoslav Second League: 1
  - Runner-up: 1991
- Macedonian Cup: 2
  - Winner: 1993 and 1995
- Macedonian Republic Cup: 1
  - Winner: 1992
- Japanese Super Cup: 1
  - Winner: 2000
- Azerbaijan Premier League: 1
  - Winner: 2009

== Managerial statistics ==
Team	Nat	From	To	Record				
Team	Nat	From	To	G	W	D	L	Win %
Pelister	(Socialist Federal Republic of Yugoslavia)	1988	1990	76	38	4	34	50.00
Vardar	(North Macedonia)	1991	1993	40	33	7	0	82.50
CSKA Sofia	(Bulgaria)	1993	1994					
Vardar	(North Macedonia)	1994	1995	45	33	11	1	73.33
Vojvodina	(Federal Republic of Yugoslavia)	1995	1996	18	11	4	3	61.11
Macedonia	(North Macedonia)	1996	1999	31	10	8	13	32.26
FK Sileks	(North Macedonia)	1998	1999	28	17	7	4	60.71
Júbilo Iwata	(Japan)	2000	2000	25	15	0	10	60.00
Vardar	(North Macedonia)	2001	2003	53	33	10	10	62.26
Kastoria	(Greece)	2003	2004					
Doxa Drama	(Greece)	2004	2005	30	11	10	9	36.67
Kastoria	(Greece)	2005	2006	15	5	6	4	33.33
Niki Volos	(Greece)	2006	2006					
Vihren Sandanski	(Bulgaria)	2006	2006	13	7	1	5	53.85
Ethnikos Piraeus	(Greece)	2006	2007	10	5	2	3	50.00
Baku	(Azerbaijan)	2007	2009	52	28	13	11	53.85
Azerbaijan	(Azerbaijan)	2007	2008	3	0	1	2	0.00
Atromitos	(Cyprus)	2009	2010	26	10	7	9	38.46
Simurq	(Azerbaijan)	2010	2011	22	2	6	14	9.09
Najran	(Saudi Arabia)	2011	2012	26	7	9	10	26.92
Al Taawoun	(Saudi Arabia)	2012	2013	15	3	4	8	20.00
Najran	(Saudi Arabia)	2013	2013	8	5	0	3	62.50
Pelister	(North Macedonia)	2014	2015	14	3	2	9	21.43
Hatta	(United Arab Emirates)	2016	2017	27	6	6	15	22.22
Al Dhafra	(United Arab Emirates)	2018	2018	47	16	7	24	34.04
Belasica	(North Macedonia)	2019	2019	4	1	1	2	25.00
Emirates	(United Arab Emirates)	2019	2021	41	25	13	3	60.98
Hajer	(Saudi Arabia)	2021	2022	38	18	9	11	47.37
Hatta	(United Arab Emirates)	2022	2022	3	1	0	2	33.33
Najran	(Saudi Arabia)	2023	2023	15	5	4	6	33.33
Hajer	(Saudi Arabia)	2023	2024	22	3	10	9	13.64
Spartak Varna	(Bulgaria)	2025		19	3	8	8	15.79
Total				766	354	170	242	46.21
