= Mirsad Jonuz =

Macedonian football coach and former player

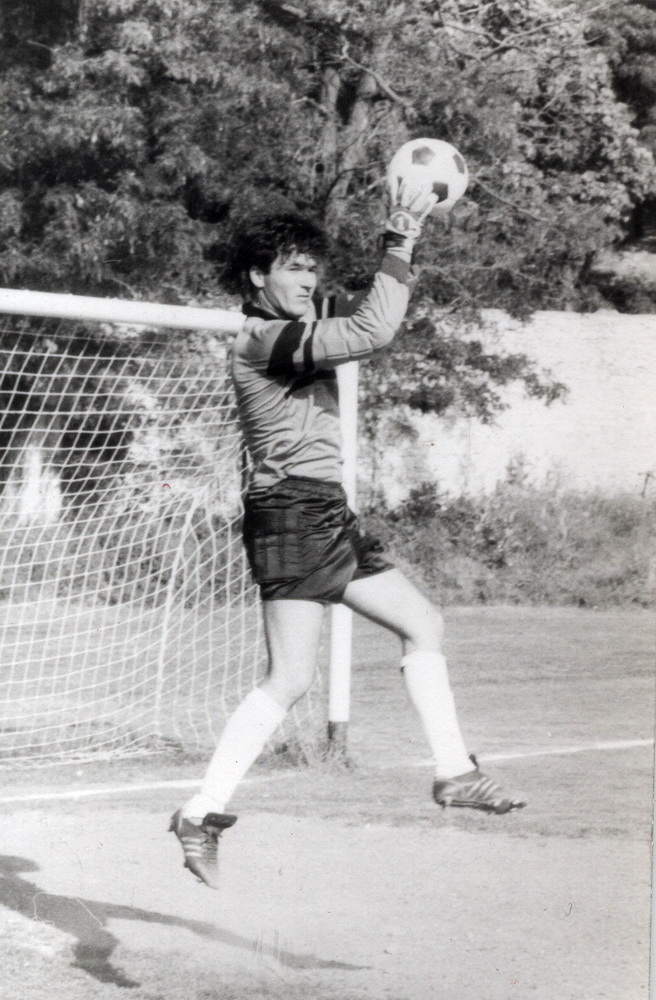
- Jonuz with FK Pobeda

Personal information
- Date of birth: 9 April 1962 (age 64)
- Place of birth: Sveti Nikole, PR Macedonia, FPR Yugoslavia
- Position: Goalkeeper

Senior career*
Years	Team	Apps	(Gls)
1985–1986	Teteks	30	(0)
1988	Rad	8	(0)
1989	Novi Pazar	1	(0)
1989–1990	Levadiakos	30	(0)
1990–1991	Sutjeska Nikšić	31	(0)
1991–1992	Vardar		
1993–1995	Levadiakos	36	(0)
1996–2000	Rabotnički		

Managerial career
- 1996–2000: Rabotnički
- 2001–2002: Pobeda
- 2002–2003: Rabotnički
- 2003–2009: Macedonia U21
- 2005: Macedonia B
- 2009–2011: Macedonia
- 2012–2013: Nea Salamis Famagusta
- 2018–2019: Aiginiakos
- 2019–2020: Vllaznia Shkodër
- 2020: Lusail SC
- * Club domestic league appearances and goals

Mirsad Jonuz (Macedonian: Мирсад Јонуз; born 9 April 1962) is a Macedonian football coach and former goalkeeper.

== Playing career ==
Born in Sveti Nikole, SR Macedonia, SFR Yugoslavia, as a player Jonuz was member of numerous Yugoslav clubs. He made his senior debut in 1985 with FK Teteks, playing then in the Yugoslav Second League. After that season he played with FK Bregalnica Štip and FK Borec before joining Belgrade side FK Rad where he made his debut in the Yugoslav First League in the 1988–89 season. During the winter break he moved to FK Novi Pazar and played the rest of the season in the Second League, before returning to the top flight in the next season by signing with FK Vardar. In the summer of 1990 he joined Second League side FK Sutjeska Nikšić. In 1993 when he moved abroad to Greece and joined Levadiakos playing in the Greek Championship.

== Managerial career ==
On 1996 he began his coaching career in FK Rabotnički and the club played in the UEFA Cup. In 2001, he took charge of FK Pobeda and made a record with 15 wins. The club also played in the Intertoto Cup, and the next year they played in UEFA Cup. In 2002, he worked at FK Rabotnichki Kometal again. From 2003 to 2009 he was a head coach of the Macedonian U-21 national team. He was also the coach of the Macedonia B team in 2005.

On 16 May 2009, Jonuz was appointed as a head coach of the Macedonian national team, replacing Slovenian Srečko Katanec. He was a head coach until June 2011.

From 2012 to 2013 he was also a coach in Nea Salamina, Cyprus. From 2014 to 2015 he was a technical director of Horizont Turnovo. From 2018 to 2019 he was a head coach of Aiginiakos, Greece.

He has a coaching UEFA PRO license.
