= North Macedonia national football team =

North Macedonia
- Nicknames: Рисови Risovi (Lynxes); Лавови Lavovi (Lions)
- Association: Football Federation of Macedonia (FFM)
- Confederation: UEFA (Europe)
- Head coach: Goce Sedloski
- Captain: Enis Bardhi
- Most caps: Goran Pandev (122)
- Top scorer: Goran Pandev (38)
- Home stadium: National Arena Todor Proeski
- FIFA code: MKD
First colours	Second colours	Third colours

FIFA ranking
- Current: 73 ▼2 (18 November 2026)
- Highest: 46 (October 2008)
- Lowest: 166 (March 2017)

First international
- Unofficial (Socialist Federal Republic of Yugoslavia) Vojvodina 3–1 Macedonia (Socialist Republic of Macedonia) (Belgrade, Yugoslavia; 3 September 1945); Official; Slovenia 1–4 Macedonia (Kranj, Slovenia; 13 October 1993)

Biggest win
- Liechtenstein 1–11 Macedonia (Eschen, Liechtenstein; 9 November 1996)

Biggest defeat
- England 7–0 North Macedonia (Manchester, England; 19 June 2023)

European Championship
- Appearances: 1 (first in 2020)
- Best result: Group stage (2020)
- Website: ffm.mk

The North Macedonia national football team (Macedonian: Фудбалска репрезентација на Северна Македонија, romanized: Fudbalska reprezentacija na Severna Makedonija) represents North Macedonia in men's international football. It is administered by the Football Federation of Macedonia. The team plays their home matches at the Toše Proeski National Arena in Skopje.

North Macedonia has reached Euro 2020 (its first major tournament) and the European qualifying play-off final of the 2022 World Cup (after defeating Germany in Duisburg and Italy in Palermo).

== History ==
=== Early years (1991–1996) ===
==== First official international match ====

The squad on the first official international match against Slovenia on 13 October 1993

They had their first official international match as a 4–1 victory against Slovenia in a friendly on 13 October 1993 under coach Andon Dončevski. In 1994, the newly proclaimed Republic of Macedonia became a separate member of FIFA and UEFA after its independence referendum and split of the Yugoslav federal team.

==== Euro 1996 qualifiers ====
The UEFA Euro 1996 qualifying was the first major qualifying tournament that Macedonia participated in as an independent nation, grouped with Spain, Denmark, Belgium, Cyprus and Armenia. In their opening game, which was also their first ever official match, Macedonia played the reigning European champions Denmark, finishing 1–1 after Macedonia led for most of the game. Later, Macedonia suffered one of its worst ever defeats, 5–0 against Belgium on 7 June 1995. They failed to qualify for UEFA Euro 1996, finishing fourth in the group with seven points.

=== 1996–2001 ===
==== 1998 FIFA World Cup qualification ====
The tournament began on 24 April 1996 with a 3–0 win at home against Liechtenstein. On 9 November 1996, Macedonia recorded their biggest ever, an 11–1 thrashing victory against Liechtenstein. Macedonia defeated the Republic of Ireland 3–2 at home, their first victory against a major European team, but failed again to qualify for the 1998 World Cup in France, finishing fourth in the group on 13 points.

==== UEFA Euro 2000 qualification ====
Macedonia's journey to qualify for the UEFA Euro 2000 in the Netherlands and Belgium saw them grouped with FRY, Republic of Ireland, Croatia, and Malta. They once again opened their qualifying campaign with a victory after beating Malta 4–0 at home on 6 September 1998. Their most notable result in the campaign was a 1–1 draw against Croatia in June 1999, with an equalizer of Georgi Hristov ten minutes before the end of the game. They helped Yugoslavia qualify directly and eliminate Croatia because they drew 1–1 against the Republic of Ireland with a last-minute equalizer of Goran Stavrevski. However, they failed to qualify again, finishing fourth in the group with eight points.

==== 2002 FIFA World Cup qualification ====
Macedonia's 2002 World Cup qualifying campaign saw them grouped with Sweden, Turkey, Slovakia, Moldova, and Azerbaijan. They were unsuccessful in their opening match, going down to Slovakia 2–0 in Bratislava on 3 September 2000. The Macedonians once again failed to qualify for the 2002 World Cup as they finished fourth in the group with seven points.

=== Rise and fall (2001–2006) ===
==== UEFA Euro 2004 qualification ====
The Euro 2004 Qualifiers saw Macedonia grouped alongside England, Turkey, Slovakia, and Liechtenstein. Macedonia played England in Southampton, England's first home match in Southampton in almost 100 years. Macedonia grabbed the lead early in the first half after Artim Šakiri scored directly from a corner kick. England soon leveled the game, before Macedonia led again. The game eventually ended 2–2. Macedonia lost to England 2–1 at home in the return leg, which took place in September 2003. Macedonia's only win of the campaign came on 7 June 2003, when they beat Liechtenstein 3–1 at home.

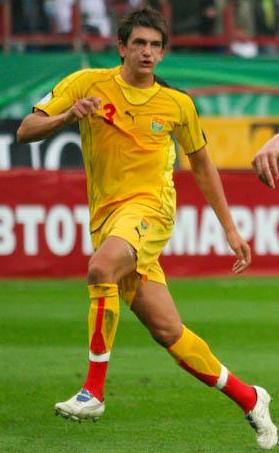
Goran Popov

==== 2006 FIFA World Cup qualification ====
On 9 October 2004, Macedonia managed to hold the Netherlands to a surprise 2–2 draw in Skopje in front of a crowd of 17,000 at the Skopje City Stadium, but just four days later, they suffered a 1–0 loss away to Andorra. Macedonia then set a new team record for most goals conceded in a game when they lost 6–1 away to the Czech Republic in June 2005.

=== Best FIFA ranking (2006–2010) ===
==== Euro 2008 qualifiers ====
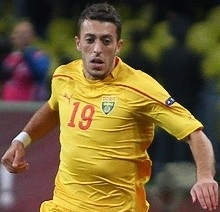
Agim Ibraimi

Macedonia opened its UEFA Euro 2008 qualifying campaign with a 1–0 away victory against Estonia on 16 August 2006. Macedonia hosted England on 6 September in their second game of the qualifiers. England went on to win 1–0, the first time that Macedonia failed to score against the country.

A month later, on 7 October 2006, the two teams met once again in Manchester, where England was held to a 0–0 draw in front of 72,062 people. On 17 October 2007, Macedonia recorded their first win on home soil since August 2004 when they defeated Andorra 3–0 in Skopje.

Macedonia then recorded one of their most impressive wins to date when they picked up a 2–0 victory over eventual group winners Croatia on 17 November 2007. It was also a first victory for Macedonia against a nation that was ranked in the top ten of the FIFA World Rankings. Despite this, Macedonia failed to qualify for Euro 2008 after finishing fifth in the group with 14 points.

==== 2010 UEFA World Cup qualification ====
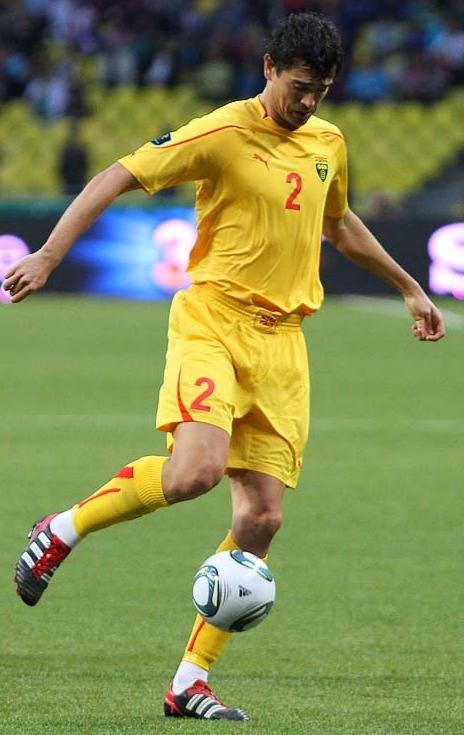
Vanche Shikov

On 25 November 2007, just days after Macedonia completed its qualifying campaign for Euro 2008, the groups for European qualifiers for the 2010 World Cup were held in Durban, South Africa, where Macedonia was seeded in Pot 4 and grouped along with the Netherlands, Scotland, Norway and Iceland. Manager Srečko Katanec received a two-year extension on 21 December 2007, which meant he would be under contract through the end of the 2010 World Cup qualifiers. In the lead up to the campaign, Macedonia played three friendlies against Serbia, Bosnia and Herzegovina and Poland, which all ended in draws.

On 6 September 2008, Macedonia opened their campaign with a 1–0 home win against Scotland when Ilčo Naumoski scored on a rebound after a missed free kick by Goce Sedloski. Following these impressive results, they moved up ten places to 46th in the FIFA world rankings for October 2008, their highest ever ranking. However, Katanec resigned following a 4–0 loss to the Netherlands in Amsterdam in April 2009, allegedly for getting into an argument with Goran Pandev.

Soon afterwards, the manager of the under-21 team, Mirsad Jonuz, was appointed senior coach and remained until the end of the World Cup qualifying campaign. On 12 August 2009, a friendly match against Spain was held at the newly built City Park Stadium in Skopje. The defending European champions won 3–2 after being 2–0 down at halftime. In September, Macedonia lost 2–0 against Scotland and Norway.

=== Fall and resurgence (2010–2018) ===
==== Euro 2012 qualifiers ====
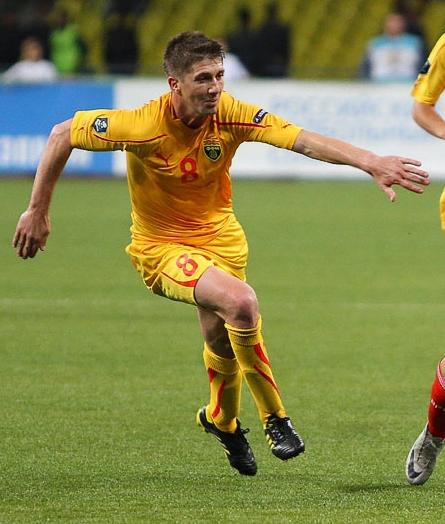
Veliče Šumulikoski

Macedonia was placed in Group B for the Euro 2012 qualifiers alongside Russia, Slovakia, Republic of Ireland, Armenia and Andorra. In the lead up to the qualifiers, an under-strength Macedonia side played friendlies against Azerbaijan, Romania, and Malta, winning the first two 3–1 and 1–0 respectively, and tied 1–1 against Malta later the summer.

Macedonia finished fifth in the group with only two victories against Andorra as well as two home draws, against Armenia and Slovakia. Coach Mirsad Jonuz was dismissed on 18 June 2011 and replaced by John Toshack.

==== 2014 FIFA World Cup qualification ====
Macedonia's 2014 World Cup qualifying campaign saw them grouped with Croatia, Serbia, Belgium, Scotland and Wales. In August 2012, prior to the qualifiers, John Toshack resigned and was replaced by Čedomir Janevski. The national team would begin the qualification round with a loss to Croatia in Zagreb and would go on to draw against Scotland in Glasgow. They lost again to Croatia and won against Serbia in Skopje after a penalty kick taken by Agim Ibraimi. Later in qualification, the national team would go on to lose twice to the eventual group winners Belgium.

Macedonia would beat Wales and lose against Scotland at home. Around the end of September 2013, Janevski would leave the team for Belgian club R.A.E.C. Mons and would be replaced by Zoran Stratev for the last two matches. Away losses to Wales and Serbia meant they would finish last in their group.

After the run, Goran Pandev, Nikolče Noveski, Veliče Šumulikoski and others would retire from the national team due to turbulent relations with the Football Federation of Macedonia. In November 2013, Boško Gjurovski would be appointed the new national team manager.

Ironically, a significant number of players originally from Macedonia appeared at the 2014 World Cup, including Blerim Džemaili, Admir Mehmedi and Shkodran Mustafi who couldn't be convinced to represent Macedonia instead.

==== UEFA Euro 2016 qualification ====
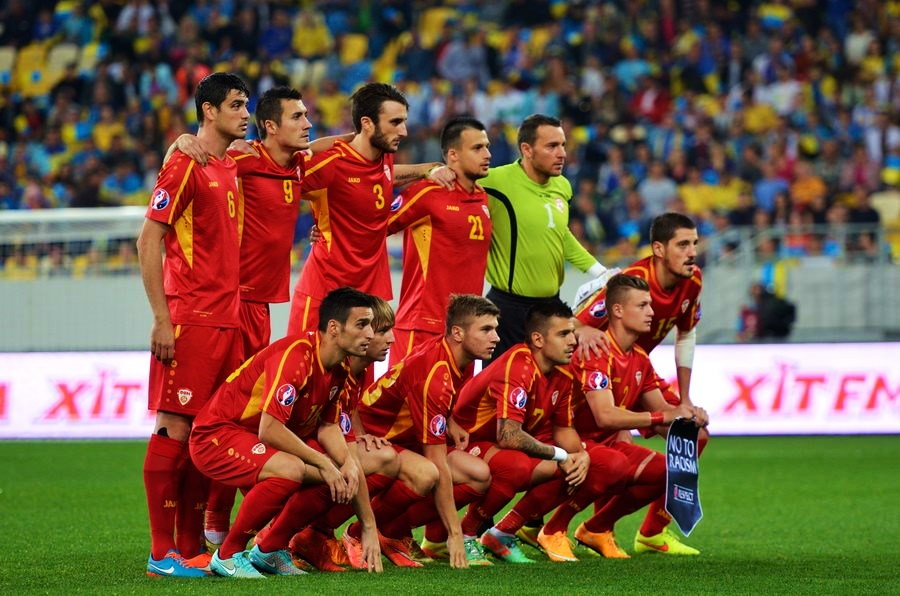
The team before a match with Ukraine in 2014

On 23 February 2014, Macedonia was placed in Group C for the Euro 2016 qualifiers alongside Spain, Ukraine, Slovakia, Belarus and Luxembourg. With 5–1 loss against Spain in Valencia, the only victory they earned was against Luxembourg in Skopje.

After four losses, coach Boško Gjurovski was dismissed on 7 April 2015 and replaced by Ljubinko Drulović. Further losses came against Slovakia and surprisingly Luxembourg. Macedonia drew their last match with Belarus in Barysaw, but still finished last in their group.

==== 2018 World Cup qualifiers ====
On 25 July 2015, in the middle of the Euro 2016 qualifying, Macedonia was seeded in Pot 5. They were put in the same group as Spain again, for the first time with Italy, along with Albania, Israel, and Liechtenstein.

In October 2015, Drulović left the national team. and the manager place was taken over by the former manager of Rabotnički, Igor Angelovski. That same month, 2010 UEFA Champions League champion Goran Pandev came back to the national team after two years of absence.

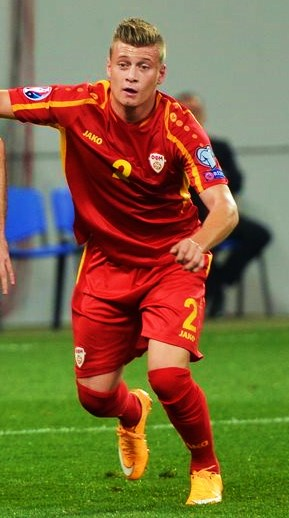
Ezgjan Alioski

Macedonia started with another disappointing loss against Albania in Shkodër, with a goal scored by Bekim Balaj in the last moments of the game, in a match that was played over two days because of interruption in the 76th minute due to weather. Later on they also lost to Israel at home after missing a penalty kick by Adis Jahović. After that, the national team also lost to Italy beside their 2–1 lead with the goals scored by Ilija Nestorovski and Ferhan Hasani. At the end of 2016, Macedonia was beaten by Spain in Granada 4–0; Macedonia had not scored a single point, the worst qualifying start in the history of the national team.

In March 2017, Macedonia recorded their first 3–0 qualification victory against Liechtenstein. They later lost against Spain in Skopje 2–1. Macedonia also defeated Israel away through the sole goal by Goran Pandev, which was also a first ever victory against Israel. Macedonia later tied Albania in Strumica 1–1.

=== 2018–present ===
==== 2018–19 UEFA Nations League D ====
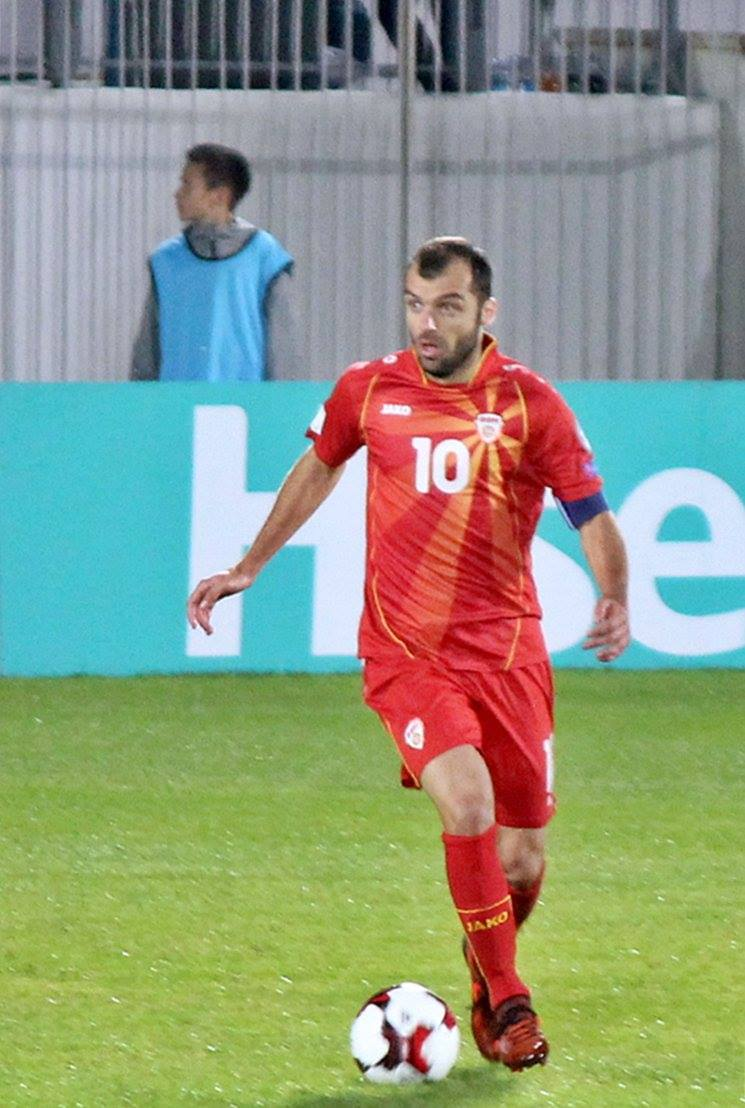
Goran Pandev

In the inaugural UEFA Nations League, Macedonia played in League D, the lowest division. Macedonia were drawn in Group 4 with Armenia, Liechtenstein and Gibraltar. The national team won the group with five wins and one loss, were promoted to the League C for the next edition of the Nations League, and were assured of a UEFA Euro 2020 qualifying play-offs place.

==== Euro 2020 qualifiers ====
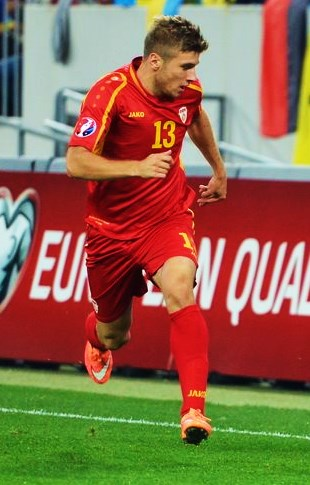
Stefan Ristovski

For the UEFA Euro 2020 qualifying, the newly-renamed North Macedonia were placed in Group G, along with Austria, Israel, Latvia, Poland, and Slovenia. North Macedonia managed two first impressive results with a 1–1 away draw against Slovenia. Prior to the match, Macedonia defeated Latvia 3–1 at home. However, North Macedonia would soon fall 1–0 to Poland and 4–1 to Austria. Later, the North Macedonia recorded a 1–1 away draw against Israel, and a 2–1 home victory against Slovenia. North Macedonia lost 2–0 away against Poland, and 2–1 away against Austria, ending up in third place.

However, due to them having successfully taken first place in the UEFA Nations League earlier, North Macedonia eventually reached its first ever competitive playoff in history and was scheduled against Kosovo. Eventually, in the UEFA Euro 2020 qualifying play-offs semi-final, North Macedonia overcame Kosovo 2–1 at home. Then they faced Georgia in the final of Path D's play-offs on 13 November in Tbilisi, winning 1–0.

==== 2020–21 UEFA Nations League C ====
After winning the League D group in the first edition of the UEFA Nations League, North Macedonia were promoted to the third division of the competition, League C. North Macedonia was drawn in Group 2 together with Armenia, Estonia and Georgia.

==== UEFA Euro 2020 ====

The starting lineup against Austria in group C at the UEFA Euro 2020

North Macedonia made their Euros debut in 2020, postponed to 2021 due to the COVID-19 pandemic. All three Group C matches ended up in a loss, to Austria, Ukraine, and the Netherlands; Goran Pandev equalized against Austria in the 28th minute and Ezgjan Alioski scored against Ukraine. North Macedonia was the second debutant, after Finland.

==== 2022 World Cup qualifiers ====
For the 2022 World Cup qualifying campaign, North Macedonia was drawn in Group J with Germany, Romania, Iceland, Armenia and Liechtenstein. On matchday 3, North Macedonia inflicted a 2–1 defeat on Germany in Duisburg, which was Germany's first World Cup qualification defeat since 2001 and only the third in their history. In the last two games against Armenia and Iceland, North Macedonia won both (5–0 away against Armenia, 3–1 against Iceland) to put them in 2nd in Group J. Qualifying for the play-offs, they defeated reigning European champions Italy in Palermo on 24 March 2022, and faced Portugal in the play-off final on 29 March where they lost 2–0.

=== 2022 Downfall and low records ===
==== 2022–23 UEFA Nations League C and Euro 2024 qualification ====
North Macedonia played in the UEFA Nations League against Georgia, Gibraltar, and Bulgaria – eventually finishing third place. Meanwhile, in the UEFA Euro 2024 qualifying, North Macedonia failed to qualify for the UEFA Euro 2024, finishing fourth in their group after England, Italy, Ukraine, and above Malta.

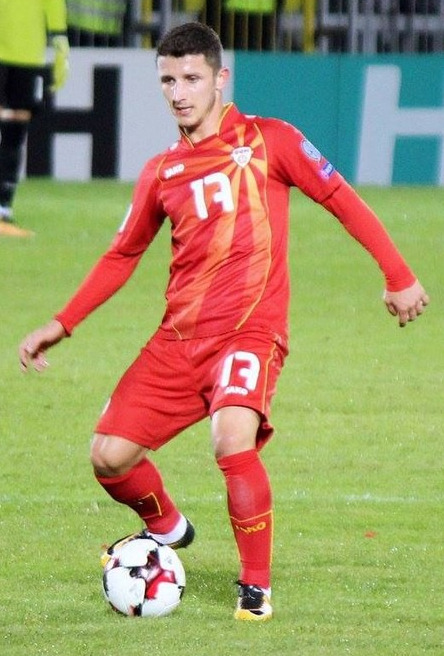
Enis Bardhi

==== 2024–25 UEFA Nations League C and World Cup 2026 qualification ====
In the 2024/25 UEFA Nations League, North Macedonia finished first in their League C group, ahead of Armenia, the Faroe Islands, and Latvia.

In the qualifiers for the 2026 World Cup in North America, North Macedonia faced Belgium, Wales, Kazakhstan, and Liechtenstein, ultimately finishing third in the group. As a UEFA Nations League group winner, North Macedonia faced Denmark in the UEFA World Cup qualifying play-off semi-finals in late March 2026. In the begging of 2026 Goce Sedlovski took over the national team. There was heavy defeat against Denmark 0-4 and a draw in the consolation match against Republic of Ireland 0:0.

== Team image ==
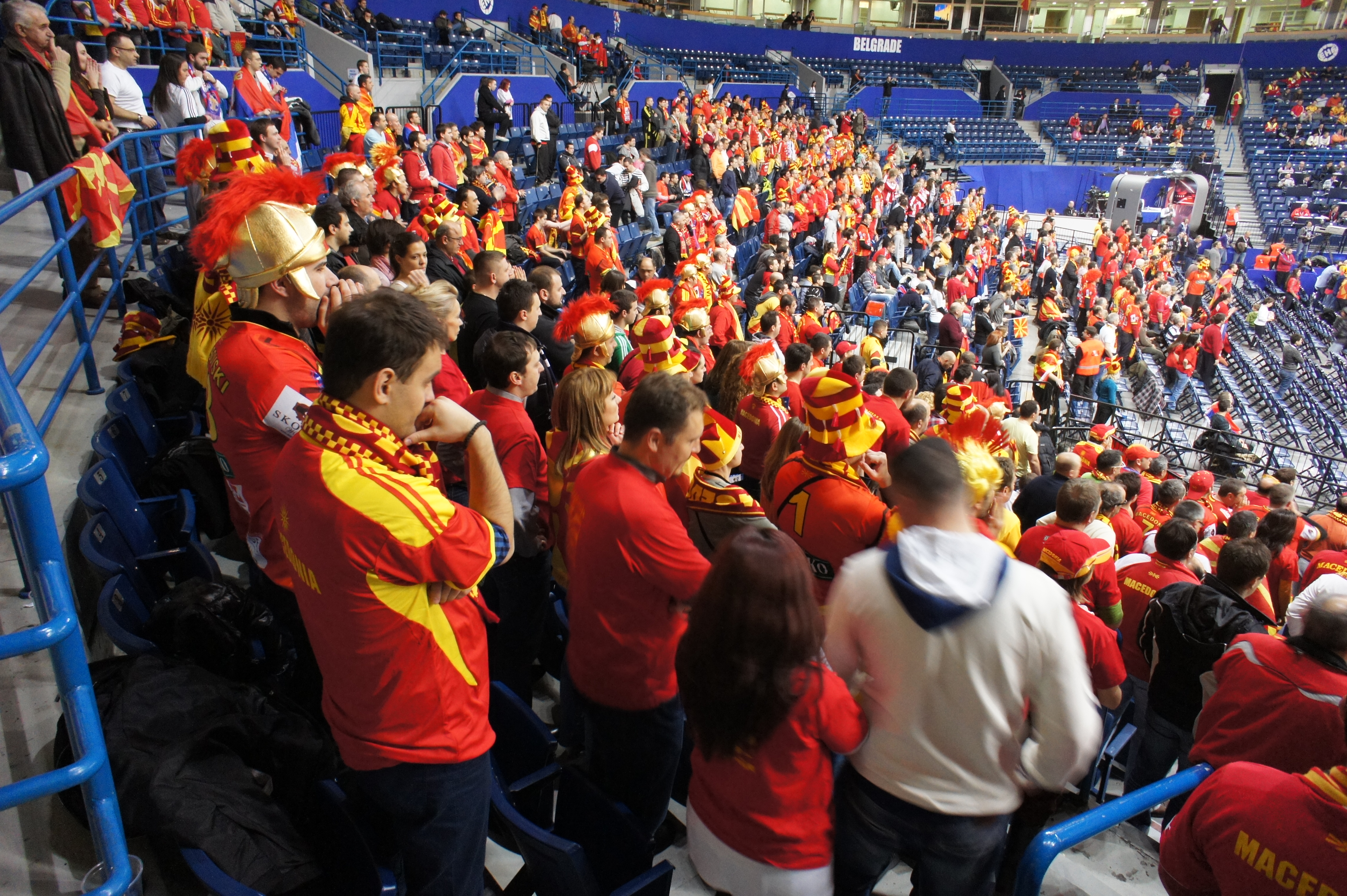
Devoted Fans

=== Stadiums ===
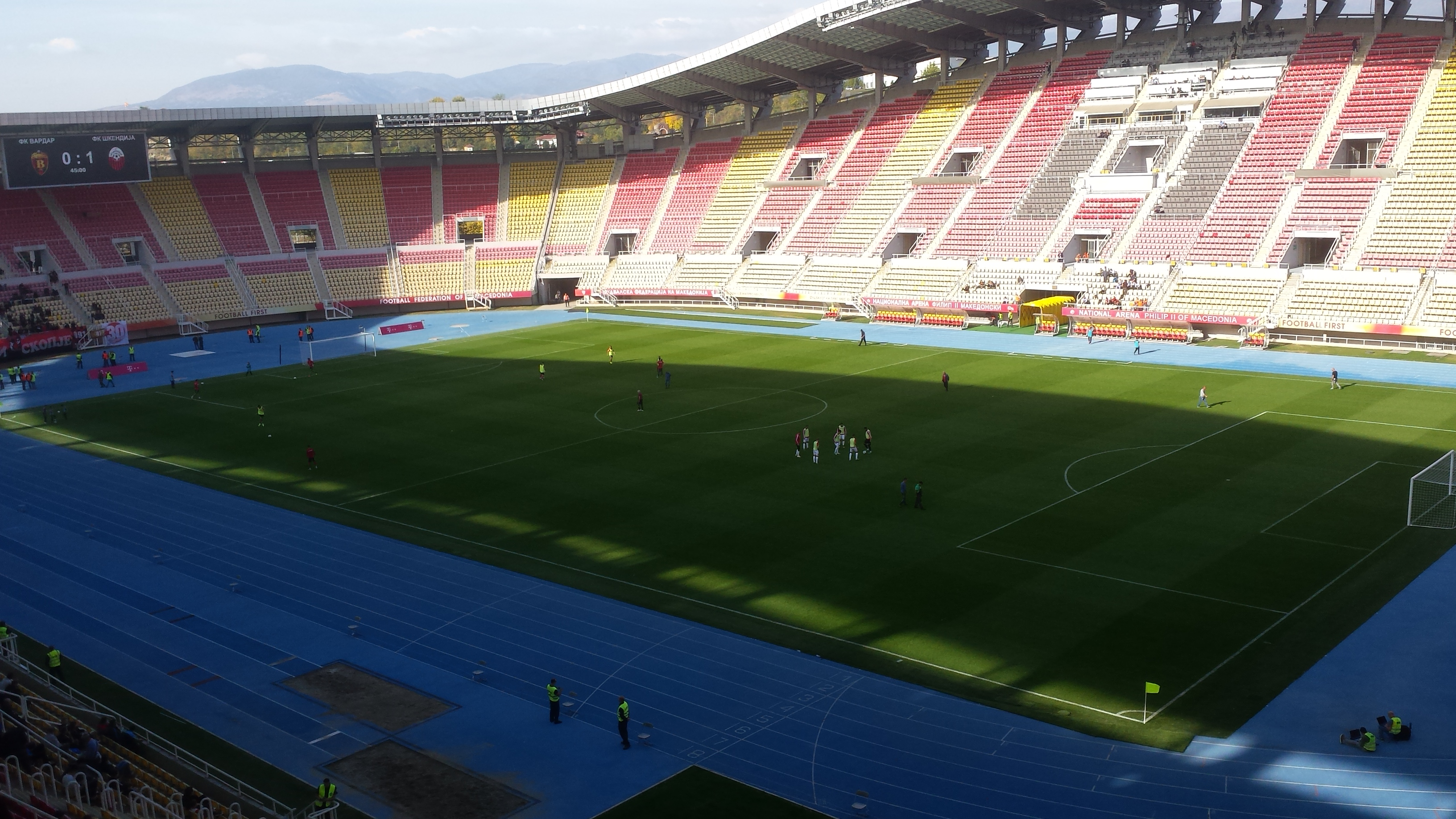
Capacity 36,500

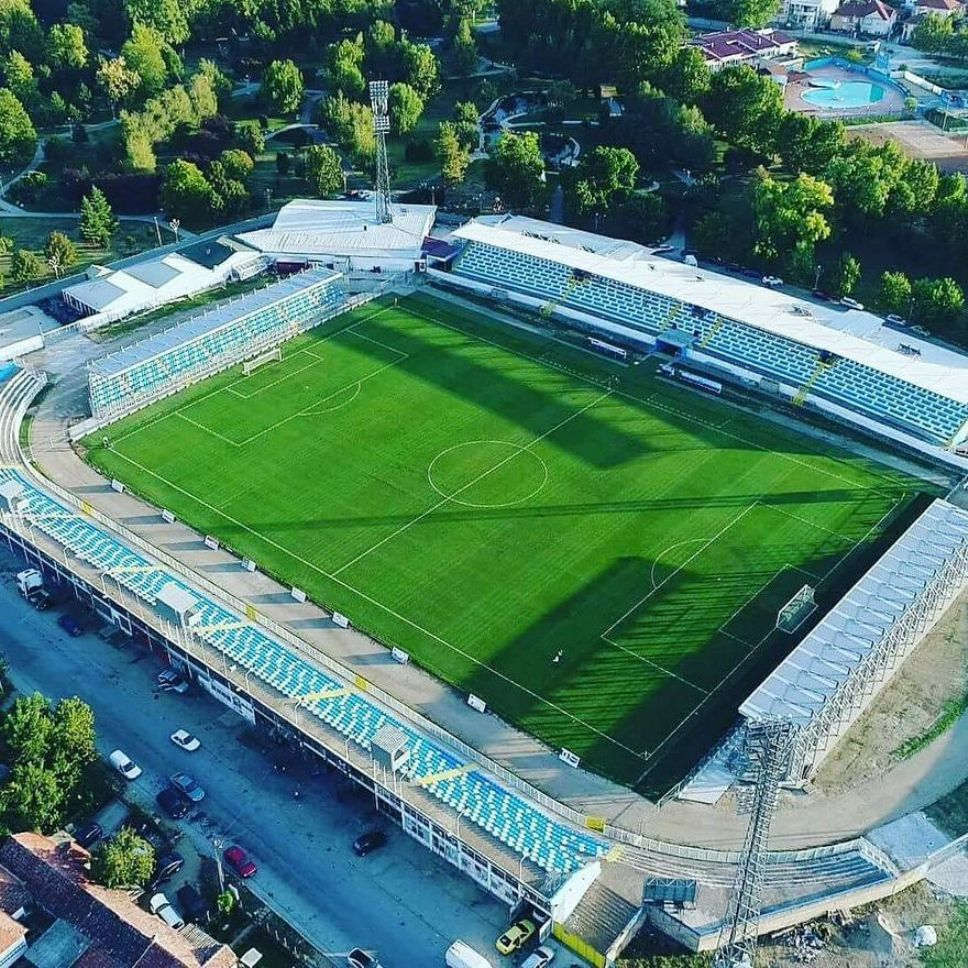
Capacity 10,000

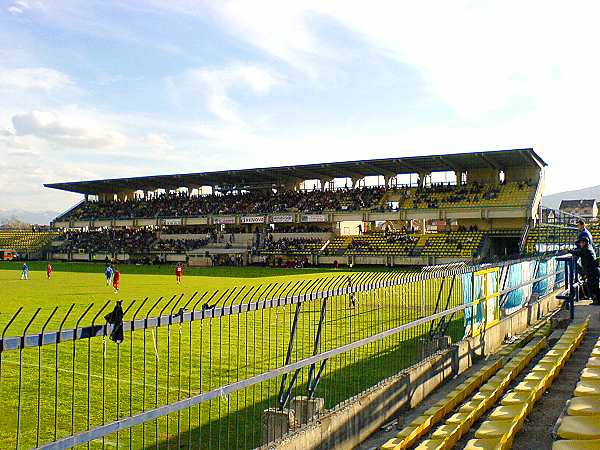
Capacity 15,000

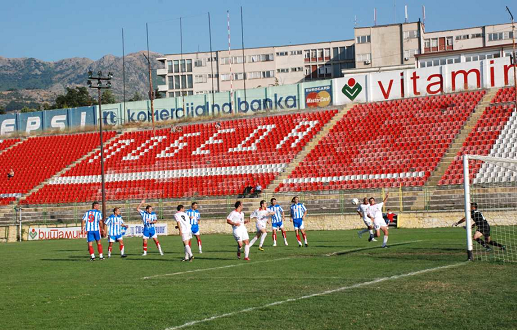
Capacity 15,000

Number of matches	Stadium	First international	Last international
133	Toše Proeski Arena, Skopje	23 March 1994	17 November 2026
5	Stadion Goce Delčev, Prilep	27 March 1996	15 November 2011
5	Stadion Mladost, Strumica	12 April 1995	17 October 2023
1	Gradski stadion, Tetovo	14 May 1994	14 May 1994
1	Gradski stadion, Kumanovo	29 September 1998	29 September 1998

=== Kit sponsorship ===
UEFA Euro 2020 Debut Kit

Kit supplier	Period
(Germany) Adidas	1992–1993
(Italy) Gems	1994–1998
(Germany) Puma	1998–2014
(Germany) Jako	2015–2025
(Germany) Adidas	2026–present

== Results and fixtures ==
The following is a list of match results in the last 12 months, as well as any future matches that have been scheduled.

Win Draw Loss Fixture

=== 2026 ===
26 March 2026 World Cup qualification play-offs	Denmark	4–0	North Macedonia	Copenhagen, Denmark
20:45 UTC+1	Damsgaard 49'; Isaksen 58', 59'; Nørgaard 75'	Report		Stadium: Parken Stadium; Attendance: 35,746; Referee: Felix Zwayer (Germany)

31 March Friendly	Republic of Ireland	0–0	North Macedonia	Dublin, Ireland
19:45 UTC+1		Report		Stadium: Aviva Stadium; Attendance: 39,560; Referee: Iwan Arwel Griffith (Wales)

29 May Friendly	Bosnia and Herzegovina	0–0	North Macedonia	Sarajevo, Bosnia and Herzegovina
20:30 UTC+2		Report		Stadium: Stadion Koševo; Attendance: 28,961; Referee: Rade Obrenović (Slovenia)

1 June Friendly	Turkey	4–0	North Macedonia	Istanbul, Turkey
20:30 UTC+3	Kökçü 2'; Uzun 16'; Gül 53'; Yılmaz 70'	Report		Stadium: Şükrü Saracoğlu Stadium; Attendance: 33,994; Referee: José Luis Munuera Montero (Spain)

26 September 2026–27 UEFA Nations League B	North Macedonia	0–3	Switzerland	Skopje, North Macedonia
20:45 UTC+2		Report	Freuler 22'; Amdouni 41', 74'	Stadium: Toše Proeski Arena; Attendance: 11,474; Referee: Daniel Schlager (Germany)

29 September 2026–27 UEFA Nations League B	Slovenia	2–0	North Macedonia	Ljubljana, Slovenia
20:45 UTC+2	Lovrić 55'; Matko 82'	Report		Stadium: Stožice Stadium; Attendance: 10,246; Referee: Andrea Colombo (Italy)

3 October 2026–27 UEFA Nations League B	North Macedonia	0–2	Scotland	Skopje, North Macedonia
20:45 UTC+2		Report	Bowie 7'; McGinn 70' (pen.)	Stadium: Toše Proeski Arena; Attendance: 8,256; Referee: François Letexier (France)

6 October 2026–27 UEFA Nations League B	Switzerland	3–0	North Macedonia	Lucerne, Switzerland
20:45 UTC+2	Rieder 43'; Manzambi 73'; Ndoye 81'	Report		Stadium: Thermoplan Arena; Attendance: 15,730; Referee: Edgars Maļcevs (Latvia)

13 November 2026–27 UEFA Nations League B	Scotland	2–1	North Macedonia	Glasgow, Scotland
	McGinn 54', 74' (.pen)		Rastoder 57'	Stadium: Hampden Park; Attendance: 41,585; Referee: Michal Očenáš (Slovakia)

16 November 2026–27 UEFA Nations League B	North Macedonia	0–3	Slovenia	Skopje, North Macedonia
20:45 UTC+1		Report	Šturm 29', 90+1'; Zec 66'	Stadium: Toše Proeski Arena; Attendance: 1,875; Referee: Serdar Gözübüyük (Netherlands)

== Coaching staff ==
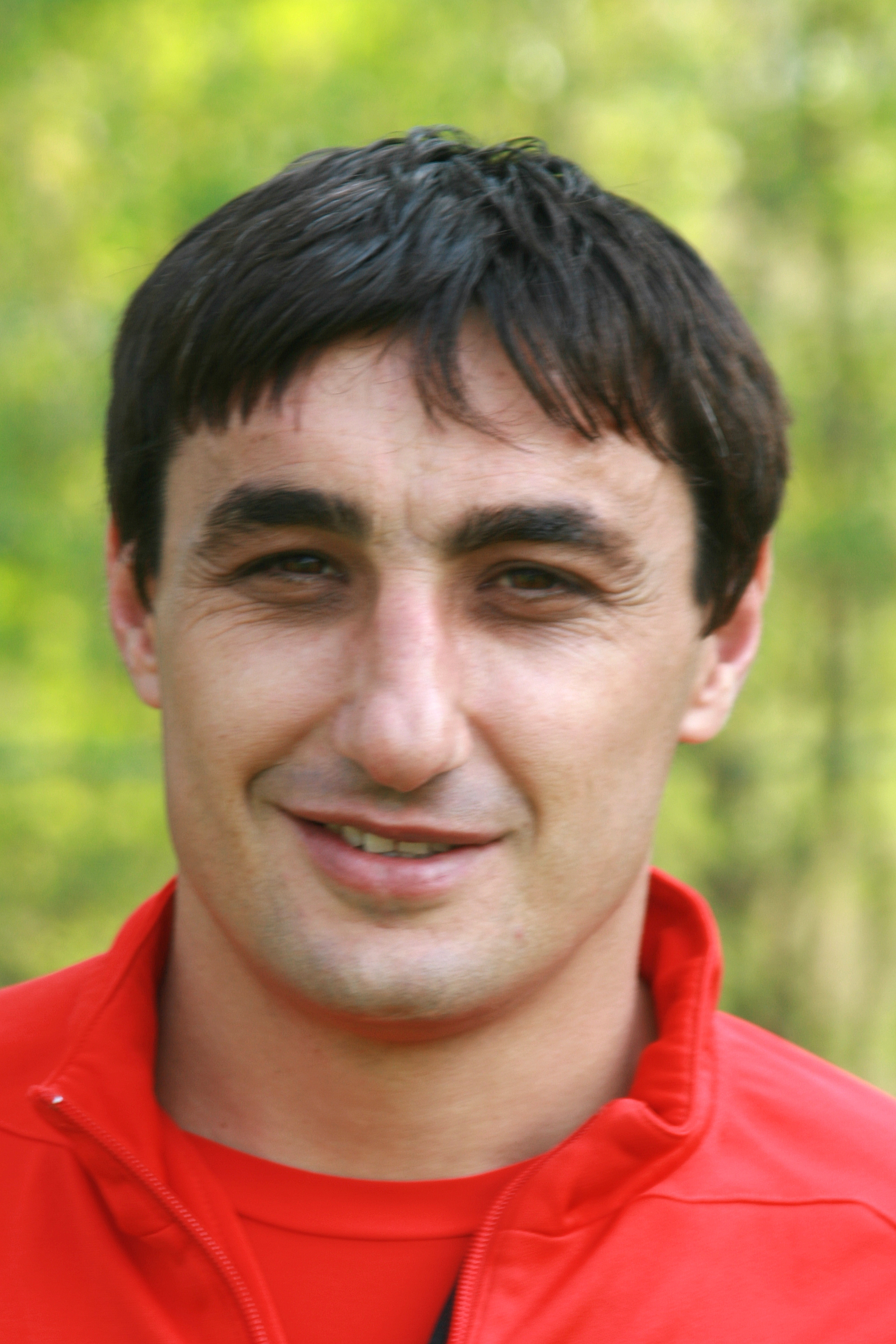
Curren head coach Goce Sedloski

Position	Name
Head coach	(North Macedonia) Goce Sedloski
Assistant coaches	(North Macedonia) Vlatko Grozdanoski (North Macedonia) Robert Stojanovski
Goalkeeper coach	(North Macedonia) Gogo Jovčev
Physical coach	(North Macedonia) Vladimir Vuksanovikj
Video analyst	(Serbia) Goran Stanić
Team doctor	(North Macedonia) Nebojsha Nastov
Physiotherapists	(North Macedonia) Makedonka Siljanoska
Masseur	(North Macedonia) Mohammed Trapanovski
Kit manager	(North Macedonia) Behar Dimoski
Team manager	(North Macedonia) Zoran Zafirov
Sporting director	(North Macedonia) Goran Pandev
Technical director	(North Macedonia) Zoran Stratev

== Coaching history ==
Updated on 14 November 2026

Name	First game	Last game	P	W	D	L	GF	GA	GD	Win %	Achievements
(North Macedonia) Gjoko Hadžievski	9 October 1991	16 June 1993	4	2	0	2	6	9	−3	50.00	
(North Macedonia) (North Macedonia) Andon Dončevski	13 October 1993	15 November 1995	17	5	5	7	23	23	+0	29.41	
(North Macedonia) Gjoko Hadžievski	27 March 1996	9 June 1999	28	10	7	11	42	37	+5	35.71	
(North Macedonia) Dragi Kanatlarovski	5 September 1999	13 February 2005	31	8	8	15	32	37	−5	25.81	
(North Macedonia) Gjore Jovanovski	2 June 2001	10 January 2002	13	0	6	7	9	27	−18	0.00	
(North Macedonia) Nikola Ilievski	27 March 2002	11 June 2003	13	3	4	6	23	24	−1	23.08	
(Serbia and Montenegro) Slobodan Santrač	30 March 2005	17 August 2005	4	1	0	3	4	12	−8	25.00	
(North Macedonia) Boban Babunski (caretaker)	7 September 2005	10 August 2011	4	2	1	1	4	6	−2	50.00	
(Slovenia) Srečko Katanec	1 March 2006	1 April 2009	27	9	7	11	28	29	−1	33.33	
(North Macedonia) Mirsad Jonuz	6 June 2009	4 June 2011	20	7	4	9	21	19	+2	35.00	
(North Macedonia) Vlatko Kostov (caretaker)	7 September 2010	7 September 2010	1	0	1	0	2	2	+0	0.00	
(Wales) John Toshack	2 September 2011	29 May 2012	8	1	4	3	4	8	−4	12.50	
(North Macedonia) Goce Sedloski (caretaker)	15 August 2012	15 August 2012	1	1	0	0	1	0	+1	100.00	
(North Macedonia) Čedomir Janevski	7 September 2012	10 September 2013	14	5	1	8	15	19	−4	35.71	
(North Macedonia) Zoran Stratev (caretaker)	11 October 2013	15 October 2013	2	0	0	2	1	6	−5	0.00	
(North Macedonia) Boško Gjurovski	5 March 2014	30 March 2015	11	2	3	6	7	12	−5	18.18	
(Serbia) Ljubinko Drulović	14 June 2015	12 October 2015	5	0	1	4	1	6	−5	0.00	
(North Macedonia) Igor Angelovski	12 November 2015	21 June 2021	53	23	11	19	83	65	+18	43.40	UEFA Euro 2020 group stage
(North Macedonia) Blagoja Milevski	2 September 2021	18 November 2025	48	18	14	16	64	62	+2	37.50	
(North Macedonia) Goce Sedloski	23 December 2025		9	0	2	7	1	20	−19	0.00	
Total			313	97	79	137	371	423	−52	30.99	—

== Players ==
=== Current squad ===
The following players were called up for the 2026–27 UEFA Nations League matches against Scotland and Slovenia on 13 and 16 November 2026, respectively.

Information correct as of 17 November 2026, after the match against Slovenia.

No.	Pos.	Player	Date of birth (age)	Caps	Goals	Club
1	GK	Davor Taleski	19 May 1995 (age 31)	1	0	(Football Federation of Macedonia) Vardar
12	GK	Damjan Shishkovski	18 March 1995 (age 31)	12	0	(Football Association of Bosnia and Herzegovina) Borac
23	GK	Stole Dimitrievski	25 December 1993 (age 32)	96	0	(Royal Spanish Football Federation) Valencia
2	DF	Bojan Ilievski	1 September 1999 (age 27)	14	0	(Albanian Football Federation) Tirana
3	DF	Stefan Despotovski	23 January 2003 (age 23)	4	0	(Football Association of Serbia) Beograd
4	DF	Nikola Serafimov	11 August 1999 (age 27)	29	1	(Bulgarian Football Union) Levski
5	DF	Mario Mladenovski	16 September 2000 (age 26)	6	0	(Croatian Football Federation) Varaždin
6	DF	Visar Musliu	13 November 1994 (age 32)	80	2	(Royal Belgian Football Association) Sint-Truiden
8	DF	Ezgjan Alioski	12 February 1992 (age 34)	94	13	(Swiss Football Association) Lugano
13	DF	Anes Meliqi	9 January 2006 (age 20)	3	0	(Football Federation of Macedonia) Shkëndija
	DF	Sebastián Herrera	23 January 1995 (age 31)	5	0	(Football Association of Bosnia and Herzegovina) Borac
	DF	Imran Fetai	2 August 2002 (age 24)	3	0	(Romanian Football Federation) Dinamo
7	MF	Eljif Elmas	24 September 1999 (age 27)	85	13	(Italian Football Federation) Atalanta
10	MF	Enis Bardhi (captain)	2 July 1995 (age 31)	88	20	(Turkish Football Federation) Konyaspor
15	MF	Matej Gashtarov	15 November 2006 (age 20)	6	0	(Football Association of Serbia) Crvena Zvezda
16	MF	Boban Nikolov	28 July 1994 (age 32)	52	4	(Football Federation of Macedonia) Vardar
18	MF	Agon Elezi	1 March 2001 (age 25)	20	0	(Football Association of Bosnia and Herzegovina) Sarajevo
20	MF	Luka Stankovski	2 September 2002 (age 24)	7	1	(Ukrainian Association of Football) Kolos
21	MF	Jani Atanasov	31 October 1999 (age 27)	35	3	(Kazakhstan Football Federation) Aktobe
9	FW	Elmin Rastoder	7 October 2001 (age 25)	13	1	(Hellenic Football Federation) Panathinaikos
11	FW	Darko Churlinov	11 July 2000 (age 26)	44	5	(Polish Football Association) Pogoń
14	FW	Ljupcho Doriev	13 September 1995 (age 31)	15	0	(Uzbekistan Football Association) Sogdiana
17	FW	Azer Omeragikj	14 July 2002 (age 24)	7	0	(Football Federation of Macedonia) Vardar
19	FW	Marko Gjorgjievski	18 April 2000 (age 26)	1	0	(Football Federation of Macedonia) Shkëndija
22	FW	Hristijan Maleski	4 May 2002 (age 24)	4	0	(Football Federation of Macedonia) Struga
	FW	Dimitar Mitrovski	28 January 1999 (age 27)	11	0	(Football Association of Slovenia) Olimpija

=== Recent call-ups ===
The following players have been called up to the national team in the past 12 months but are not part of the current squad.

Pos.	Player	Date of birth (age)	Caps	Goals	Club	Latest call-up
GK	Dejan Iliev ^{INJ}	25 February 1995 (age 31)	1	0	Unattached	v. Republic of Ireland, 31 March 2026
DF	Gjoko Zajkov	10 February 1995 (age 31)	48	1	(United Arab Emirates) Ajman	v. Switzerland, 6 October 2026
DF	Andrej Stojchevski ^{INJ}	26 May 2003 (age 23)	10	0	(Czech Republic) Slovácko	v. Switzerland, 6 October 2026
DF	Din Alomerovikj	29 June 1997 (age 29)	3	0	(Romania) UTA	v. Switzerland, 6 October 2026
DF	Gjorge Djekov	18 October 2005 (age 21)	1	0	(North Macedonia) Sileks	v. Switzerland, 6 October 2026
DF	Darko Velkovski	21 June 1995 (age 31)	62	3	(Bahrain) Al-Khaldiya	v. Turkey, 1 June 2026
DF	Jovan Manev	25 January 2001 (age 25)	13	1	(North Macedonia) Shkëndija	v. Turkey, 1 June 2026
DF	Georgije Jankulov	25 November 2001 (age 24)	1	0	(North Macedonia) Vardar	v. Turkey, 1 June 2026
DF	Egzon Bejtullai ^{INJ}	7 January 1994 (age 32)	28	0	Unattached	v. Republic of Ireland, 31 March 2026
MF	Tihomir Kostadinov	4 March 1996 (age 30)	38	0	(Czech Republic) Slovácko	v. Switzerland, 6 October 2026
MF	Darko Angjeleski	19 July 1999 (age 27)	1	0	(North Macedonia) Sileks	v. Turkey, 1 June 2026
MF	Sefer Emini	15 July 2000 (age 26)	1	0	(Denmark) Sønderjyske	v. Turkey, 1 June 2026
MF	Isnik Alimi	2 February 1994 (age 32)	23	2	(China) Dalian Yingbo	v. Republic of Ireland, 31 March 2026
MF	Reshat Ramadani ^{INJ}	30 June 2003 (age 23)	3	0	(Ukraine) Dynamo	v. Republic of Ireland, 31 March 2026
FW	Bojan Miovski	24 June 1999 (age 27)	45	9	(Scotland) Rangers	v. Switzerland, 6 October 2026
FW	Milan Ristovski	8 April 1998 (age 28)	40	4	(Indonesia) Bhayangkara	v. Turkey, 1 June 2026
FW	Darko Dodev	16 January 1998 (age 28)	1	0	(Kazakhstan) Altai	v. Turkey, 1 June 2026
FW	Aleksandar Trajkovski ^{RET}	5 September 1992 (age 34)	98	24	Unattached	v. Republic of Ireland, 31 March 2026
FW	Lirim Qamili	4 June 1998 (age 28)	14	2	(Denmark) Sønderjyske	v. Republic of Ireland, 31 March 2026
FW	Danny Musovski	30 November 1995 (age 30)	2	0	(United States) Seattle Sounders	v. Republic of Ireland, 31 March 2026
Notes: ^{INJ} = Withdrew due to injury; ^{PRE} = Preliminary squad / standby; ^{RET} = Retired from the national team; ^{SUS} = Serving suspension; ^{U21} = Player called up to the U21 squad.; ^{WD} = Player withdrew from the squad.

== Statistics ==
As of 13 November 2026
Players in bold are still active with North Macedonia.

=== Most appearances ===
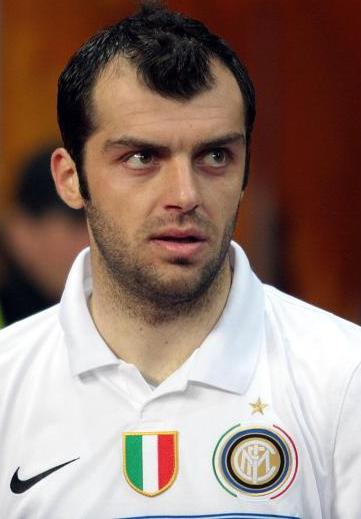
Goran Pandev is North Macedonia's top goalscorer and their most capped player.

Rank	Player	Caps	Goals	Career
1	Goran Pandev	122	38	2001–2021
2	Goce Sedloski	100	8	1996–2010
3	Aleksandar Trajkovski	98	24	2011–2026
4	**Stole Dimitrievski**	95	0	2015–present
5	**Ezgjan Alioski**	93	13	2013–present
6	**Enis Bardhi**	87	20	2015–present
7	**Eljif Elmas**	84	13	2017–present
8	Veliče Šumulikoski	84	1	2002–2013
9	Stefan Ristovski	82	2	2011–2023
10	**Visar Musliu**	79	2	2017–present

=== Top goalscorers ===
Rank	Player	Goals	Caps	Ratio	Career
1	Goran Pandev	38	122	0.31	2001–2021
2	Aleksandar Trajkovski	24	98	0.24	2011–2026
3	**Enis Bardhi**	20	87	0.23	2015–present
4	Georgi Hristov	16	48	0.33	1995–2005
5	Artim Šakiri	15	73	0.21	1996–2006
6	**Eljif Elmas**	13	84	0.15	2017–present
6	**Ezgjan Alioski**	13	93	0.14	2013–present
8	Goran Maznov	10	45	0.22	2001–2009
8	Ilija Nestorovski	10	52	0.19	2016–2023
10	**Bojan Miovski**	9	45	0.2	2021–present
10	Ilčo Naumoski	9	46	0.2	2003–2012

=== Captains ===
This is a list of Macedonian captains for five or more official and friendly matches.

Player	Period	Games as captain (Total caps)	Major tournaments as captain (Games)
Darko Pančev	1993–1995	**6** (6)	
Toni Micevski	1996–2001	**12** (44)	
Artim Šakiri	2002–2005	**10** (72)	
Goce Sedloski	2004–2009	**43** (100)	
Veliče Šumulikoski	2009–2012	**11** (84)	
Goran Pandev	2010–2013	**22** (75)	
Tome Pachovski	2014–2015	**10** (46)	
Goran Pandev	2016–2021	**69** (122)	UEFA Euro 2020 (3)
Stefan Ristovski	2019–2023	**16** (82)	
Enis Bardhi	2021–	**35** (87)	

Note: Some of the other players to have captained the team include: Dragi Kanatlarovski (1 cap; 1993), Ilija Najdoski (3; 1994), Dančo Celeski (2; 1995), Ljupčo Markovski (4; 1995 to 1997), Mitko Stojkovski (2; 1998), Boban Babunski (2; 1996 and 1999), Georgi Hristov (2; 2002 to 2003), Petar Miloševski (2; 2004 and 2008), Ilčo Naumoski (1; 2008), Igor Mitreski (4; 2007 to 2010), Aleksandar Lazevski (1; 2010), Nikolče Noveski (4; 2011 to 2013), Daniel Mojsov (1; 2012), Boban Grncharov (3; 2012 to 2014), Blazhe Ilijoski (1; 2014), Blagoja Todorovski (1; 2014), Vanče Šikov (4; 2015), Ivan Trichkovski (4; 2018 to 2020), Ilija Nestorovski (1; 2019), Darko Velkovski (1; 2022), Eljif Elmas (1; 2023) and Stole Dimitrievski (3; 2024 to 2026).

== Competitive record ==
=== FIFA World Cup ===
FIFA World Cup record									Qualification record						
Year	Round	Position	Pld	W	D	L	GF	GA	Pld	W	D	L	GF	GA	Position
(Uruguay) 1930 to (Italy) 1990	1930,1950,1954,1958,1962,1974,1982,1990; Within Yugoslavia team								Within Yugoslavia team						
(United States) 1994	Did not enter								Did not enter						
(France) 1998	Did not qualify								10	4	1	5	22	18	4/6
(South Korea) (Japan) 2002	Did not qualify								10	1	4	5	11	18	4/6
(Germany) 2006	Did not qualify								12	2	3	7	11	24	5/7
(South Africa) 2010	Did not qualify								8	2	1	5	5	11	4/5
(Brazil) 2014	Did not qualify								10	2	1	7	7	16	6/6
(Russia) 2018	Did not qualify								10	3	2	5	15	15	5/6
(Qatar) 2022	Did not qualify								12	6	3	3	24	13	2/6 (play-offs)
(Canada) (Mexico) (United States) 2026	Did not qualify								9	3	4	2	13	14	3/5 (play-offs)
(Morocco) (Portugal) (Spain) 2030	To be determined								To be determined						
(Saudi Arabia) 2034	To be determined								To be determined						
Total		0/8	–	–	–	–	–	–	81	23	19	39	108	129	—

=== UEFA European Championship ===
UEFA European Championship record									Qualification record						
Year	Round	Position	Pld	W	D	L	GF	GA	Pld	W	D	L	GF	GA	Position
(France) 1960 to (Sweden) 1992	1960,1968,1972,1976,1984,1992; Within Yugoslavia team								Within Yugoslavia team						
(England) 1996	Did not qualify								10	1	4	5	9	18	4/6
(Belgium) (Netherlands) 2000	Did not qualify								8	2	2	4	13	14	4/5
(Portugal) 2004	Did not qualify								8	1	3	4	11	14	4/5
(Austria) (Switzerland) 2008	Did not qualify								12	4	2	6	12	12	5/7
(Poland) (Ukraine) 2012	Did not qualify								10	2	2	6	8	14	5/6
(France) 2016	Did not qualify								10	1	1	8	6	18	6/6
(Europe) 2020	Group stage	23rd	3	0	0	3	2	8	12	6	2	4	15	14	3/6 (PO winners)
(Germany) 2024	Did not qualify								8	2	2	4	10	20	4/5
(England) (Scotland) (Republic of Ireland) (Wales) 2028	To be determined								To be determined						
(Italy) (Turkey) 2032	To be determined								To be determined						
Total	Group stage	1/8	3	0	0	3	2	8	78	19	18	41	84	123	—

=== UEFA Nations League ===
UEFA Nations League record
Season	Division	Group	Pld	W	D	L	GF	GA	GD	P/R	RK
2018–19	D	4	6	5	0	1	14	5	+9	▲	41st
2020–21	C	2	6	2	3	1	9	8	+1	Same position	40th
2022–23	C	4	6	2	1	3	7	7	0	Same position	42nd
2024–25	C	4	6	5	1	0	10	1	+9	▲	35th
2026–27	B	1	6	0	0	6	1	15	−14	TBD	32nd
2026–27	B	Relegation play-off	TBD	0	0	0	0	0	0	TBD	32nd
Total			30	14	5	11	41	36	+5	35th	

=== Olympic Record ===
- 1896-1912 Within Ottoman Empire team
- Within Yugoslavia Team

1920 Round 1, 1924 Preliminary, 1928 Preliminary, 1948 (2nd), 1952 (2nd), 1956 (2nd), 1960 Champion, 1964 1/4 finals, 1980 (4th), 1984 (3rd), 1988 group

- 1992 : didn’t participate (Note: North Macedonia was part of Independent Olympic Participants team which did not compete in the Football tournament)
- Since 1996 under 21 team plays at Olympics
- 1996 did not enter
- 2000–2024 did not qualify

=== Minor tournaments ===
- Yugoslav Football Tournament
  - 5th place: 1945

(Socialist Republic of Macedonia) Team Macedonia
Rustenov, Bogojevski, Vidovik, Martinovski, Petrovski, Davidovski, Janevski, Adamovski, Atanaskov, Balevski, Gerov. Manager: Illes Spitz

- Yugoslav tournament 1975 Brotherhood and Unity
  - 2nd place

(Socialist Republic of Macedonia) Team Macedonia
Sharenac, Grncharov, Srebrov, Andreevski, Krstanov, Filipovski, Dimitrovski, Rajchevski, Nikolikj, Spasovski, Draganikj, Paunovski. Manager: Chaslav Bozhinovski

== Head-to-head record ==
As of 1 June 2026, after the match against Turkey.

North Macedonia all-time head-to-head record
Against	Region	Pld	W	D	L	GF	GA	GD	Win %	First match	Last match
Albania	UEFA	10	4	4	2	12	7	+5	40%	14 May 1994	5 September 2017
Andorra	UEFA	6	4	1	1	9	1	+8	66.67%	13 October 2004	6 September 2011
Angola	CAF	1	0	1	0	0	0	0	0%	29 May 2012	
Armenia	UEFA	15	8	3	4	27	18	+9	53.33%	10 May 1995	13 October 2024
Australia	AFC	2	0	1	1	0	1	−1	0%	12 March 1997	30 March 2015
Austria	UEFA	3	0	0	3	3	9	−6	0%	10 June 2019	13 June 2021
Azerbaijan	UEFA	8	5	2	1	15	8	+7	62.5%	26 July 2000	20 November 2022
Bahrain	AFC	1	0	1	0	1	1	0	0%	7 January 2001	
Belarus	UEFA	3	1	1	1	4	2	+2	33.33%	27 March 2015	28 March 2017
Belgium	UEFA	6	0	3	3	2	10	−8	0%	16 November 1994	10 October 2025
Bosnia and Herzegovina	UEFA	6	1	4	1	8	8	0	16.67%	3 June 1998	29 May 2026
Bulgaria	UEFA	9	2	2	5	4	9	−5	22.22%	12 April 1995	26 September 2022
Cameroon	CAF	2	0	0	2	0	3	−3	0%	9 February 2011	26 May 2014
Canada	CONCACAF	2	1	0	1	3	1	+2	50%	18 May 1998	14 November 2009
China	AFC	5	0	2	3	0	4	−4	0%	27 January 2004	22 June 2014
Croatia	UEFA	9	1	2	6	9	15	−6	11.11%	14 October 1998	3 June 2024
Cyprus	UEFA	2	1	1	0	4	1	+3	50%	17 December 1994	11 October 1995
Czech Republic	UEFA	4	0	1	3	3	11	−8	0%	28 February 2001	10 June 2024
Denmark	UEFA	4	1	1	2	4	6	–2	25%	7 September 1994	6 March 2026
Ecuador	CONMEBOL	1	1	0	0	2	1	+1	100%	28 May 2006	
Egypt	CAF	1	0	1	0	2	2	0	0%	29 September 1998	
England	UEFA	6	0	3	3	4	13	-9	0%	16 October 2002	20 November 2023
Estonia	UEFA	6	4	2	0	13	7	+6	66.67%	1 June 1994	15 November 2020
Faroe Islands	UEFA	3	2	1	0	3	1	+2	66.67%	27 March 2023	17 November 2024
Finland	UEFA	6	1	2	3	3	12	−9	16.67%	10 January 2002	17 November 2022
FR Yugoslavia	UEFA	3	0	0	3	4	9	–5	0%	5 September 1999	23 February 2000
Georgia	UEFA	5	1	2	2	3	7	–4	20%	8 September 2020	23 September 2022
Germany	UEFA	2	1	0	1	2	5	−3	50%	31 March 2021	11 October 2021
Gibraltar	UEFA	4	4	0	0	12	0	+12	100%	6 September 2018	12 June 2022
Hungary	UEFA	2	0	1	1	0	5	−5	0%	22 April 1998	14 November 2001
Iceland	UEFA	6	3	2	1	9	5	+4	50%	1 June 1996	14 November 2021
Iran	AFC	3	0	1	2	3	7	−4	0%	9 June 2000	2 June 2016
Israel	UEFA	7	2	1	4	7	9	−2	28.57%	20 November 2002	6 September 2019
Italy	UEFA	5	1	2	2	7	10	−3	20%	9 October 2016	17 November 2023
Jamaica	CONCACAF	1	1	0	0	2	1	+1	100%	20 April 1998	
Kazakhstan	UEFA	3	2	1	0	6	1	+5	66.67%	4 June 2021	13 October 2025
Kosovo	UEFA	1	1	0	0	2	1	+1	100%	8 October 2020	
Latvia	UEFA	6	5	1	0	11	2	+9	83.33%	13 November 2025	14 November 2024
Lebanon	AFC	1	0	0	1	0	1	−1	0%	17 November 2015	
Liechtenstein	UEFA	13	12	1	0	50	5	+45	92.31%	24 April 1996	7 September 2025
Lithuania	UEFA	3	1	0	2	2	4	−2	33.33%	6 September 1997	15 August 2012
Luxembourg	UEFA	4	2	0	2	8	6	+2	50%	20 August 2008	5 September 2015
Malta	UEFA	8	7	1	0	19	3	+16	87.5%	27 March 1996	12 September 2023
Moldova	UEFA	4	0	4	0	4	4	0	0%	11 October 2000	22 March 2024
Montenegro	UEFA	4	2	0	2	7	5	+2	50%	19 November 2008	25 March 2024
Netherlands	UEFA	5	0	2	3	3	11	−8	0%	9 October 2004	21 June 2021
Nigeria	CAF	1	0	1	0	0	0	0	0%	22 August 2007	
Norway	UEFA	4	1	1	2	3	4	−1	25%	6 June 2009	11 November 2017
Oman	AFC	1	0	0	1	0	2	−2	0%	30 December 2001	
Poland	UEFA	5	0	1	4	2	11	−9	0%	14 February 2003	13 October 2019
Portugal	UEFA	3	0	1	2	0	3	−3	0%	2 April 2003	29 March 2022
Qatar	AFC	3	1	1	1	2	2	0	33.33%	25 July 2001	30 May 2014
Republic of Ireland	UEFA	7	1	2	4	5	11	−6	14.29%	9 October 1996	31 March 2026
Romania	UEFA	7	1	1	5	7	14	−7	14.29%	14 December 1996	8 September 2021
Russia	UEFA	4	0	0	4	0	7	−7	0%	15 November 2006	2 September 2011
Saudi Arabia	AFC	3	0	1	2	2	4	−2	0%	1 August 2001	4 September 2025
Scotland	UEFA	4	1	1	2	3	5	−2	25%	6 September 2008	10 September 2013
Serbia	UEFA	3	1	1	1	3	6	−3	33.33%	6 February 2008	15 October 2013
Slovakia	UEFA	8	0	2	6	3	16	−13	0%	3 September 2000	14 June 2015
Slovenia	UEFA	7	4	2	1	13	7	+6	57.14%	13 October 1993	1 June 2021
South Korea	AFC	2	0	1	1	3	4	−1	0%	18 April 1998	7 June 2000
Spain	UEFA	7	0	0	7	4	20	−16	0%	12 October 1994	11 June 2017
Sweden	UEFA	3	0	0	3	1	4	−3	0%	24 March 2001	3 June 2013
Turkey	UEFA	9	1	2	6	9	18	−9	11.11%	31 August 1994	1 June 2026
Ukraine	UEFA	7	1	1	5	4	10	−6	25%	11 October 2003	16 October 2023
United States	CONCACAF	1	0	1	0	0	0	0	0%	16 May 1998	
Wales	UEFA	4	1	1	2	4	10	–6	25%	18 November 2025	25 March 2025
Total	67 nations	304	95	79	130	364	410	−46	31.67%		

== FIFA ranking history ==
FIFA-ranking yearly averages for North Macedonia. The country reached 46th in October 2008, and 166th in March 2017. As of 25 March 2022, they sit in 66th.

1993	1994	1995	1996	1997	1998	1999	2000	2001	2002	2003
x	90	94	86	92	59	68	76	89	85	92
2004	2005	2006	2007	2008	2009	2010	2011	2012	2013	2014
92	87	54	58	56	65	76	103	81	83	100
2015	2016	2017	2018	2019	2020	2021	2022	2023	2024	
136	162	76	68	68	65	67	65	65	67	

== See also ==
- List of North Macedonia international footballers
- North Macedonia national football team results
- North Macedonia national under-21 football team
- North Macedonia national under-19 football team
- North Macedonia national under-17 football team
- North Macedonia women's national football team
