= Bojan Ilievski =

Macedonian footballer

Personal information
- Full name: Bojan Ilievski; Бојан Илиевски
- Date of birth: 1 September 1999 (age 27)
- Place of birth: Bitola, Macedonia
- Height: 1.82 m (6 ft 0 in)
- Positions: Right back; centre back

Team information
- Current team: Tirana
- Number: 5

Youth career
- –2018: Pelister

Senior career*
Years	Team	Apps	(Gls)
2018–2021	Pelister	75	(2)
2021–2022	Rabotnichki	30	(1)
2022–2024	Makedonija G.P.	57	(2)
2024–2026	Struga	59	(3)
2026–	Tirana	8	(1)

International career^{‡}
2020	North Macedonia U21	2	(0)
2022–	North Macedonia	14	(0)
- * Club domestic league appearances and goals as of 18 June 2026 ‡ National team caps and goals as of 16 November 2026

Bojan Ilievski (Macedonian: Бојан Илиевски; born 1 September 1999) is a Macedonian professional footballer who plays as a right back for Tirana in the Abissnet Superiore.

== Club career ==
Ilievski made his senior football debut on 14 February 2018 at the age of 18, by playing 53 minutes for Pelister against Pobeda in the 19th round of the 2017–18 Macedonian First Football League season. That season he went on to play 15 games, throughout which he also scored one goal and provided one assist. On 7 June 2021, he transferred to Rabotnichki where he stayed for one season, before signing for Makedonija G.P. where he remained for two years until the club's relegation to second division. On 14 June 2024, Ilievski signed for the current champion Struga who hired him as reinforcement for the upcoming 2024–25 UEFA Champions League qualifications.

== International career ==
Ilievski has been capped for the U21 and senior national team. He made his debut for the senior team on 22 October 2022 in a friendly match against Saudi Arabia. Two years after his debut, national team coach Blagoja Milevski called him up for two 2024–25 UEFA Nations League fixtures, and started against the Faroe Islands.
