= Zoran Stratev =

Macedonian footballer and coach

Personal information
- Date of birth: 16 July 1960 (age 66)
- Place of birth: Skopje, PR Macedonia
- Height: 1.86 m (6 ft 1 in)
- Position: Midfielder

Senior career*
| Years | Team | Apps | (Gls) |
| 1976–1982 | Makedonija GjP | | |
| 1982–1986 | Ljuboten | | |
| 1986–1987 | Rabotnički | | |
| 1987–1989 | Makedonija GjP | | |

Managerial career
- 1991–1995: Makedonija GjP
- 1997–2000: Makedonija GjP
- 2000–2003: Cementarnica 55
- 2003–2004: Vardar
- 2004–2005: Cementarnica 55
- 2006–2007: Makedonija GjP
- 2007–2008: Vardar
- 2009: Shkëndija
- 2009–2010: Rabotnički
- 2011: Vardar
- 2013: Macedonia (interim)
- * Club domestic league appearances and goals

Zoran Stratev (Macedonian: Зоран Стратев; born 16 July 1960) is a Macedonian football coach and former player. He was a former interim coach of the Macedonian national football team.
