= Toše Proeski Arena =

Multi-purpose stadium in Skopje, North Macedonia

National Arena Toše Proeski Национална Арена Тоше Проески
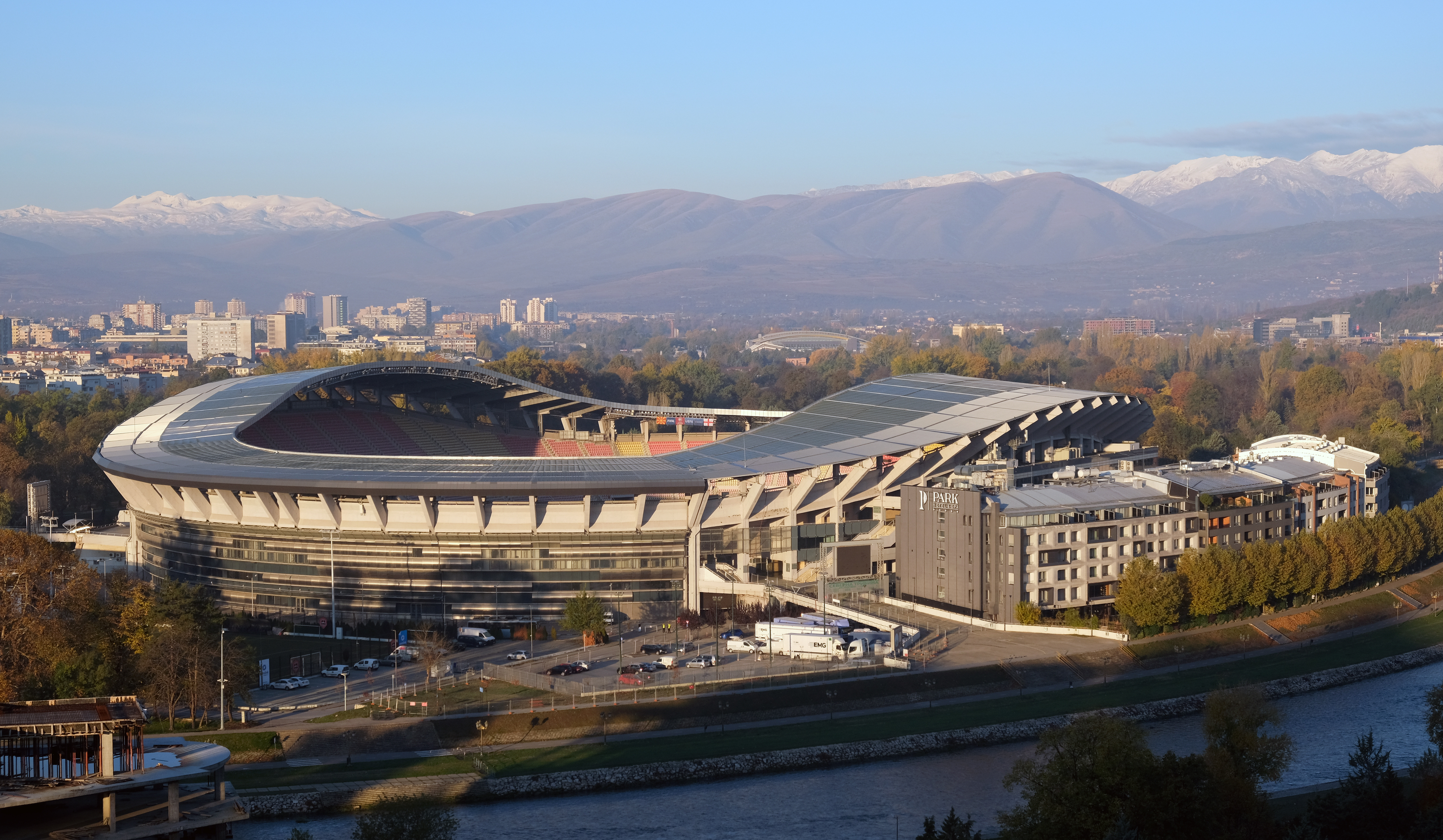
- UEFA Category 4 Stadium
- Interactive map of National Arena Toše Proeski; Национална Арена Тоше Проески
- Former names: City Park (1947–2009); Arena Philip II (2009–2019)
- Location: Skopje, North Macedonia
- Coordinates: 42°0′20″N 21°25′32″E
- Operator: JPSSO
- Capacity: 33,011
- Surface: GrassMaster
- Scoreboard: LED
- Record attendance: 32,120
- Field size: 105 m × 68 m (344 ft × 223 ft)

Construction
- Opened: 1947
- Expanded: 2011

Tenants
- FK Vardar (1947–) (2024–); FK Rabotnički; North Macedonia national football team (1994–present)

National Arena Toše Proeski (Macedonian: Национална арена „Тоше Проески“) is a sports stadium in Skopje, North Macedonia. It is currently used mostly for football matches, but also for concerts or athletics. It is the home stadium of Vardar and Rabotnichki from Skopje, who compete in the Macedonian First League, as well as the home ground of the North Macedonia national football team on almost all occasions (the other venues rarely chosen being the Goce Delčev Stadium in Prilep, or SRC Biljanini Izvori in Ohrid).

The stadium was previously known as the City Park Stadium (Macedonian: Cтадион Градски парк; Stadion Gradski Park) until 2009 and Philip II National Arena (Macedonian: Национална арена "Филип Втори") until 2019. By an executive decision of the government of North Macedonia adopted on 9 April 2019, the National Arena was renamed "National Arena Todor Proeski" in honour of the Macedonian pop icon Todor "Toše" Proeski and as result of the Prespa agreement's obligation to de-antiquization. With the capacity of just over 33,000, the National Arena is the largest stadium in the country and one of the largest in Southeastern Europe.

The stadium hosted the 2017 UEFA Super Cup.

== Reconstruction and expansion ==
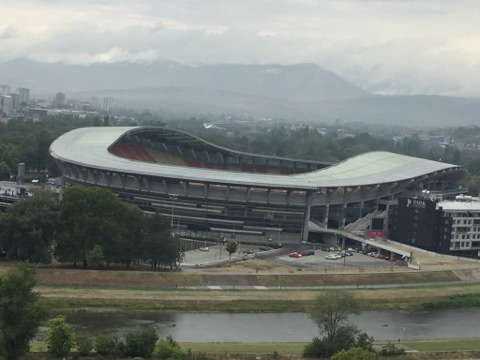
Toše Proeski Arena in 2017

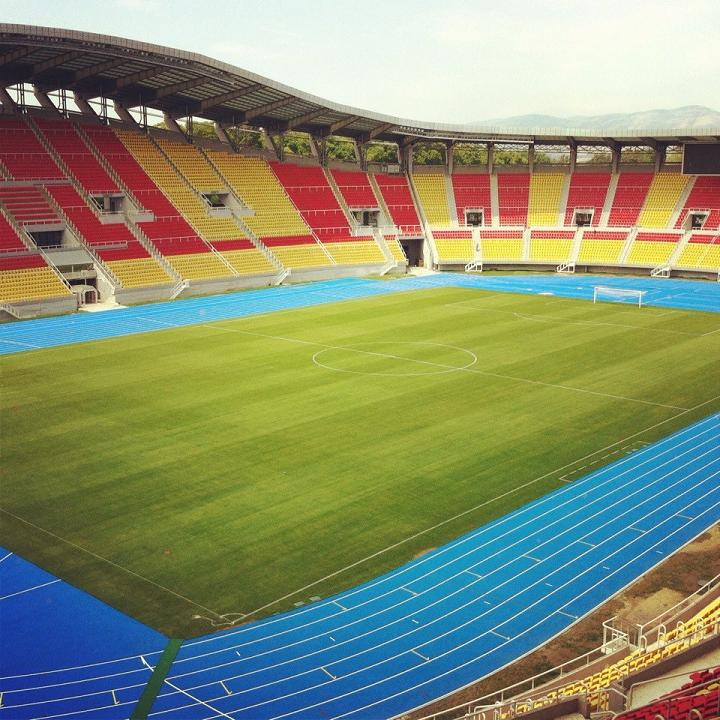
Interior

The project for the City Park stadium was designed in 1975 by architects Dragan Krstev and Todorka Mavkova from BetonConstruction Company. The South Stand started with construction in 1977. Construction of the South stand took 2 years and it was finished in 1978. The whole stadium was supposed to be finished the same year. Somehow the money from the budget were transferred to the federal budget and used for other projects.

The reconstruction and expansion started after a long delay in project implementation in January 2008. The construction of a new north stand was finished in August 2009 and was put in use on 2 August 2009, the Macedonian national holiday "Ilinden". Ten days later, on 12 August, the North Macedonia national football team played a friendly match against then European Champions Spain, as part of the 100-year anniversary of football in the country.

The reconstruction of the southern stand started in 2009, which was put into operation on 30 July of that year for the match between FK Rabotnički and Liverpool FC.

On 8 September 2009, the construction of the new western and eastern stands started. The two new stands were open for the public on 24 April 2011. By mid July 2012, the majority of the stadium was completed with the reconstruction of the new pitch and athletic track. On 25 July 2012, FK Vardar played FC BATE Borisov in the second qualifying round of the UEFA Champions League to re-open the stadium. On 8 September 2012, the Independence Day of Macedonia, a celebration was held when almost 50,000 visitors attended the event (in the stands and on the field). This event set the record of attendance for the stadium.

== Construction cost ==
Since 2008, the stadium has seen investment of about two billion denari, or €32 million. The second phase, which got underway in November 2011, saw the reconstruction of the pitch and athletic track. The athletic track around the pitch, from the original 6 was extended to 8 running tracks and it uses Tartan track surface. Total cost for this phase is €3.5 million. The stadium was finished in 2013 with the completion of a new illuminated outer facade. The total construction cost for all actions related to the stadium in the period 2008–2013 reached over €60 million.

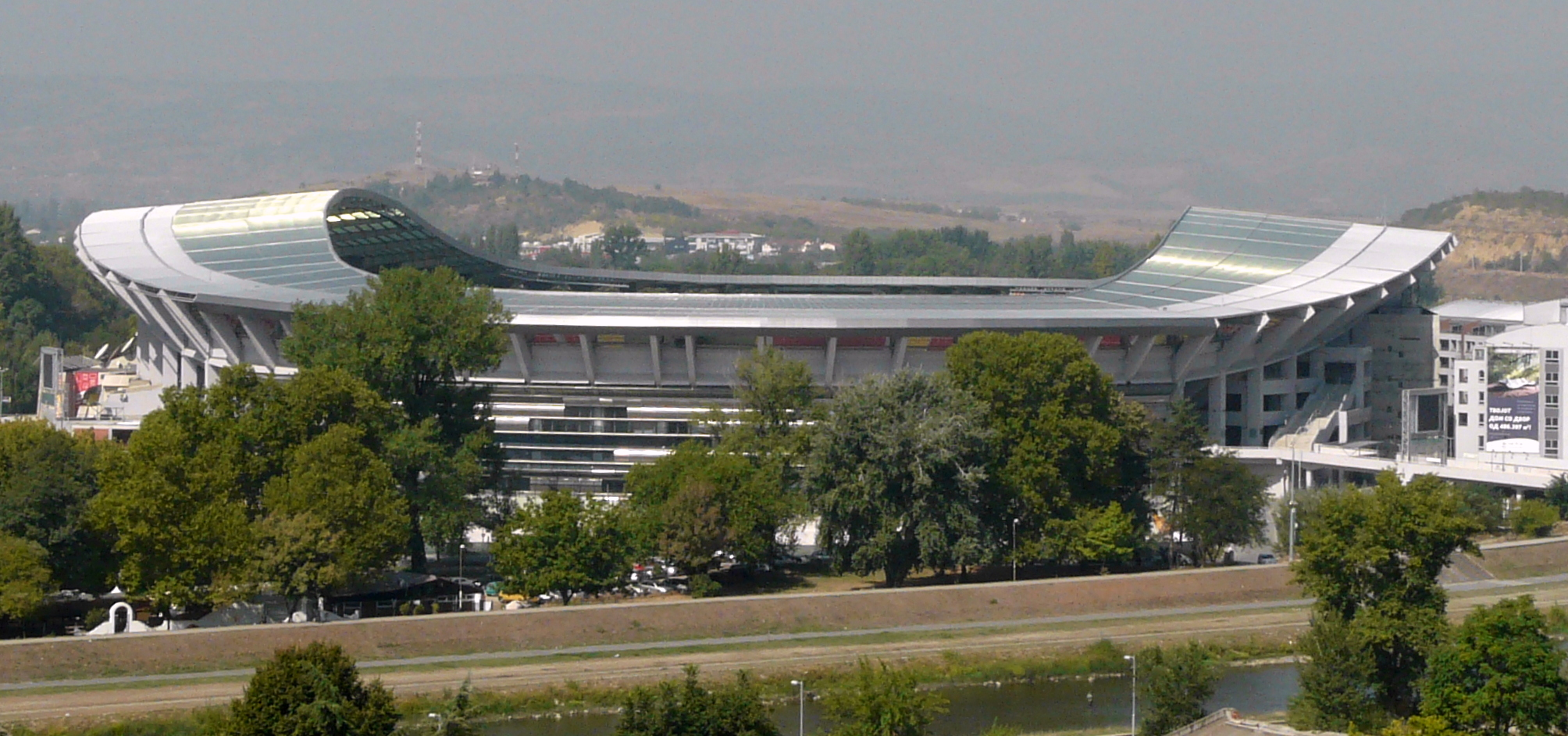

== Notable matches ==
- 1985–86 UEFA Cup First round, Second leg – 2 October 1985 between FK Vardar and FC Dinamo București.
- 1987–88 European Cup First round, Second leg – 30 September 1987 between FK Vardar and FC Porto.
- 1992–93 Macedonian Cup Final – 23 May 1993 between FK Vardar and FK Pelister.
- UEFA Euro 1996 qualifying – 7 September 1994 between Macedonia and Denmark.
- UEFA Euro 1996 qualifying – 12 October 1994 between Macedonia and Spain.
- 2000–01 UEFA Cup First round, First leg – 14 September 2000 between FK Pobeda and AC Parma.
- 2003–04 UEFA Champions League Second qualifying round, Second leg – 6 August 2003 between FK Vardar and CSKA Moscow.
- 2003–04 UEFA Champions League Third qualifying round, First leg – 13 August 2003 between FK Vardar and AC Sparta Prague.
- UEFA Euro 2004 qualifying – 6 September 2003 between Macedonia and England.
- 2003–04 UEFA Cup First round, Second leg – 15 October 2003 between FK Vardar and AS Roma.
- 2006 FIFA World Cup qualification – 9 October 2004 between Macedonia and Netherlands.
- 2005–06 UEFA Champions League Second qualifying round, First leg – 27 July 2005 between FK Rabotnički and Lokomotiv Moscow.
- 2006–07 UEFA Champions League Third qualifying round, Second leg – 23 August 2006 between FK Rabotnički and LOSC Lille.
- 2007–08 UEFA Cup First round, First leg – 20 September 2007 between FK Rabotnički and Bolton Wanderers.
- UEFA Euro 2008 qualifying – 17 November 2007 between Macedonia and Croatia.
- 2010 FIFA World Cup qualification – 6 September 2008 between Macedonia and Scotland.
- 2010–11 UEFA Europa League Third qualifying round, First leg – 29 July 2010 between FK Rabotnički and Liverpool.
- UEFA Euro 2012 qualifying – 4 June 2011 between Macedonia and Republic of Ireland.
- 2011–12 UEFA Europa League Play-offs, Second leg – 25 August 2011 between FK Rabotnički and SS Lazio.
- 2012–13 UEFA Champions League Second qualifying round, Second leg – 25 July 2012 between FK Vardar and BATE Borisov.
- 2015–16 UEFA Champions League Second qualifying round, Second leg – 21 July 2015 between FK Vardar and APOEL.
- 2015–16 UEFA Europa League Play-offs, First leg – 20 August 2015 between FK Rabotnički and Rubin Kazan.
- UEFA Euro 2016 qualifying – 8 September 2015 between Macedonia and Spain.
- 2018 FIFA World Cup qualification – 9 October 2016 between Macedonia and Italy.
- 2017 UEFA European Under-21 Championship qualification – 11 October 2016 between Macedonia and Scotland.
- 2017 UEFA Super Cup – 8 August 2017 between Real Madrid and Manchester United
- 2017–18 UEFA Europa League Play-offs, First leg – 17 August 2017 between FK Vardar and Fenerbahçe.
- 2017–18 UEFA Europa League group stage – 14 September 2017 between FK Vardar and Zenit Saint Petersburg.
- UEFA Euro 2020 qualifying play-offs semi-finals – 8 October 2020 between North Macedonia and Kosovo.
- UEFA Euro 2024 Qualifying - 23 March 2023 between North Macedonia and Malta.
- UEFA Euro 2024 Qualifying - 16 June 2023 between North Macedonia and Ukraine.
- 2026 FIFA World Cup qualification - 25 March 2025 between North Macedonia and Wales.
- 2026 FIFA World Cup qualification - 6 June 2025 between North Macedonia and Belgium.
- 2026 FIFA World Cup qualification - 7 September 2025 between North Macedonia and Liechtenstein.
- 2026 FIFA World Cup qualification - 13 October 2025 between North Macedonia and Kazakhstan.

== Concerts ==
- 1995 – Lepa Brena held a concert in front of 35,000 people.
- 1996 – Dragana Mirković held a concert in front of 15,000 people.
- 2004 – Toše Proeski held a concert in front of 20,000 people.
- 2005 – Svetlana Ražnatović held a concert in front of 30,000 people.
- 2006 – Toše Proeski held a concert in front of 30,000 people.
- 2007 – Toše Proeski held a concert in front of 50,000 people.
- 2007 – Pink held a concert in front of 20,000 people.
- 2007 – Tarkan held a concert in front of 6,000 people.
- 2009 – Carlos Santana held a concert in front of 15,000 people.
- 2012 – Garo & Tavitjan Brothers with the project Macedonian heart beats in 7/8 featuring Nina Badrić, Željko Bebek, Dado Topić, Tereza Kesovija, Josipa Lisac, Kaliopi, Hari Varešanović, Sergej Ćetković, Goran Karan, Jelena Tomašević, Antonija Šola, and Aki Rahimovski, held a concert in front of 61,000 people honoring the 21 years of Macedonian independence.
- 2014 – Željko Joksimović held a concert in front of 50,000 people.
- 2016 – David Guetta held a concert in front of 15,000 people.
- 2019 – Sting held a concert in front of an undisclosed number of people
- 2026 - David Guetta held a concert in front of more than 50,000 people

== Gallery ==
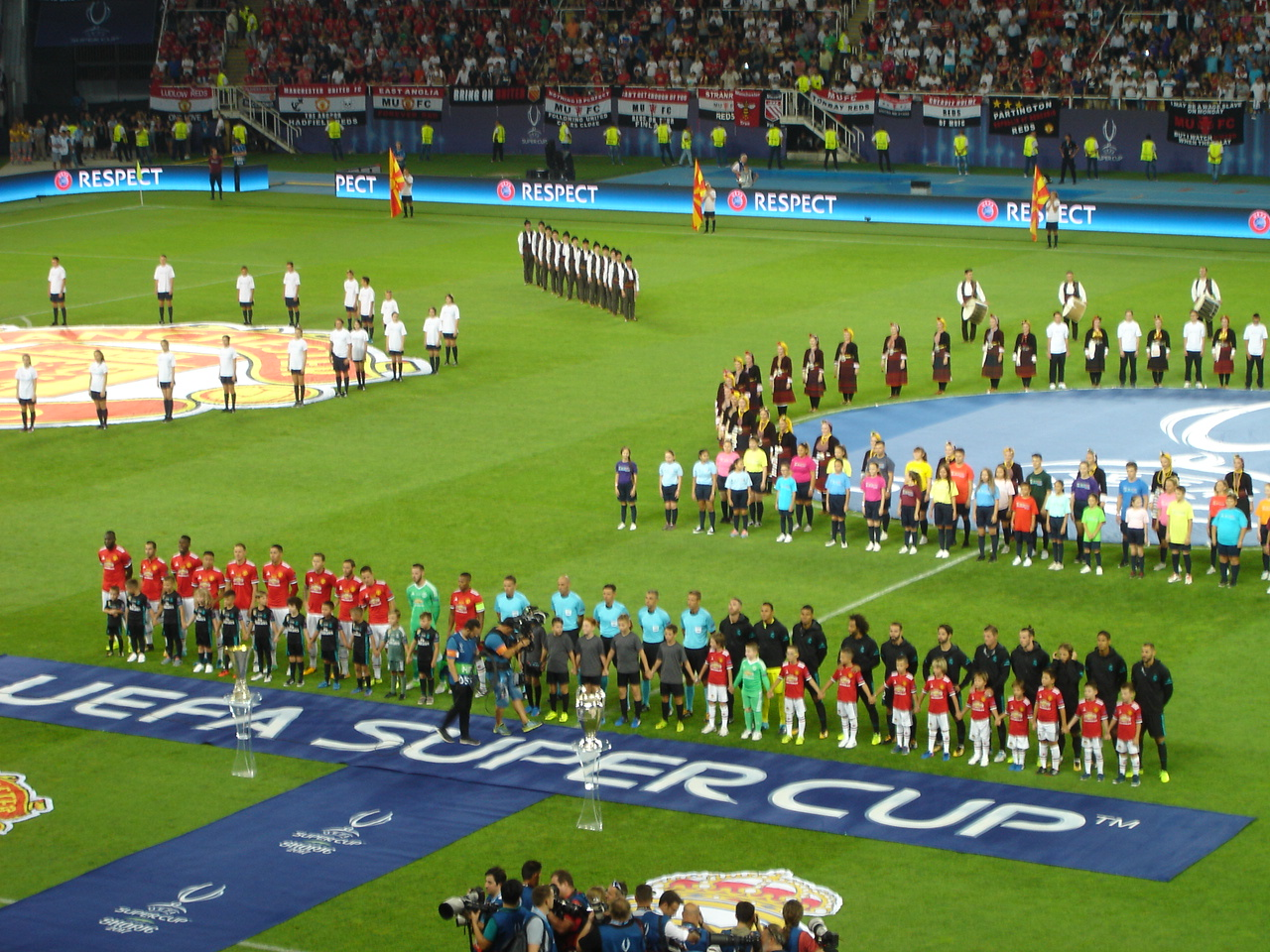
Uefa Super Cup 2017

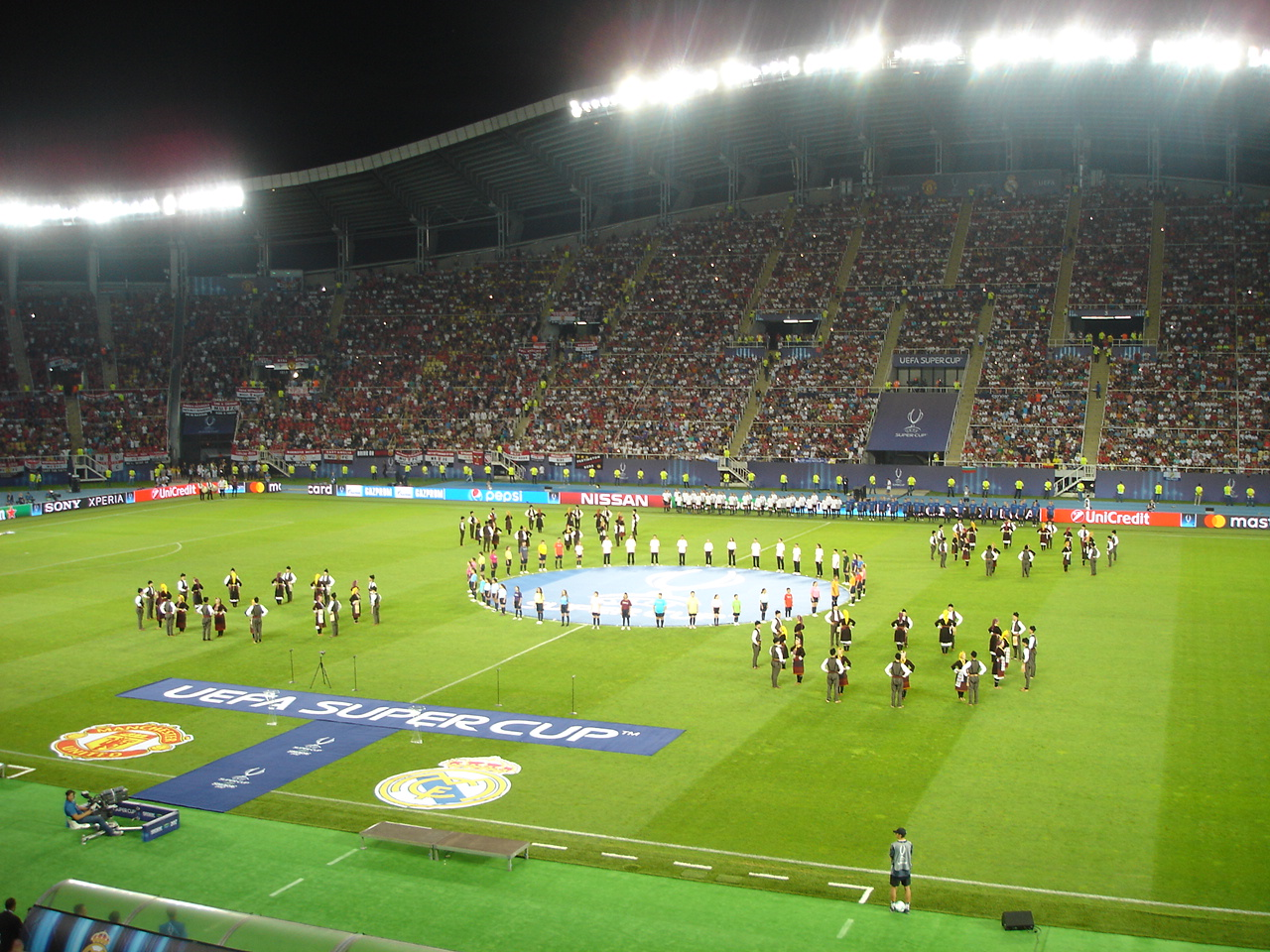
Uefa Super Cup Ceremony

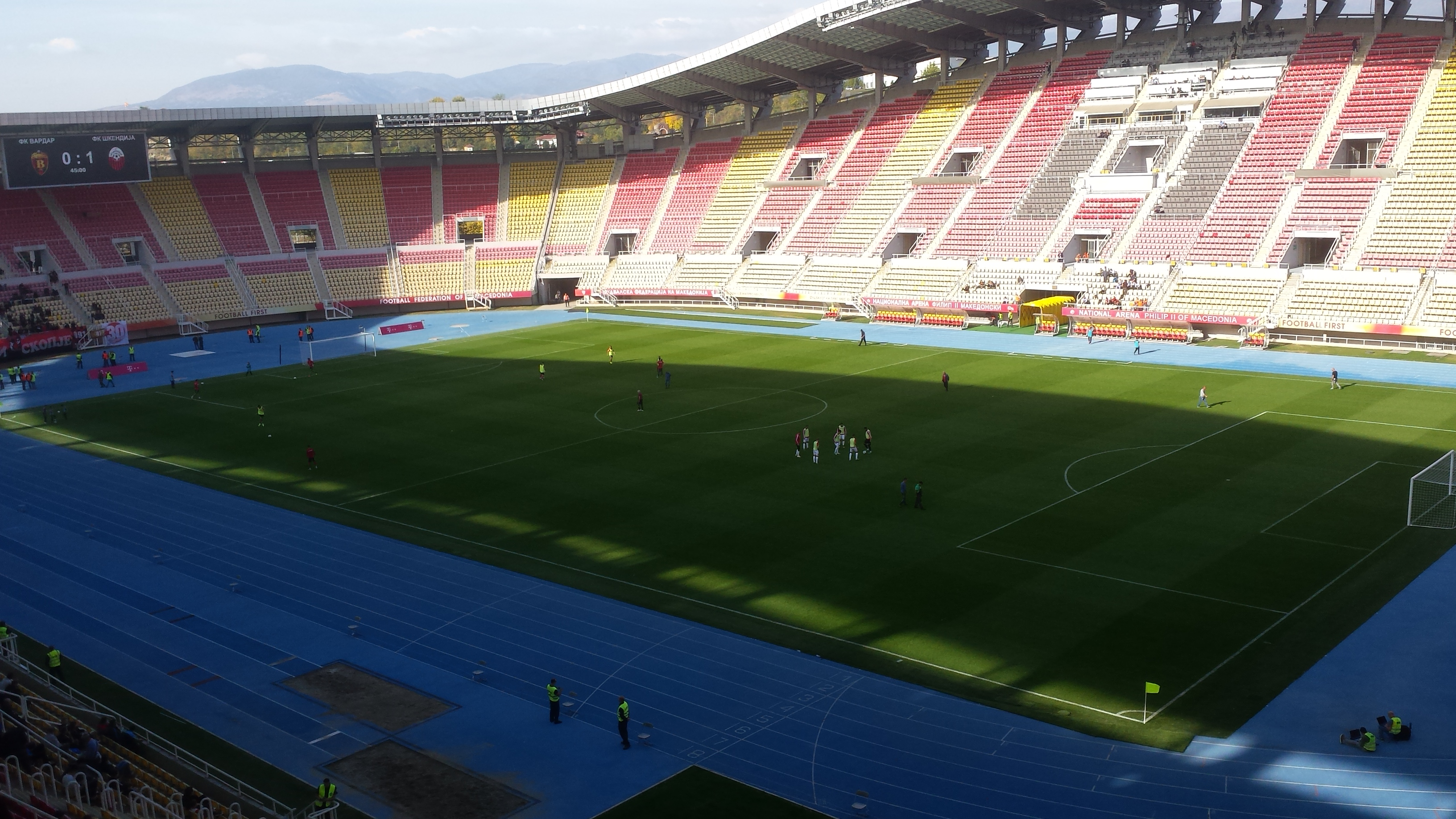

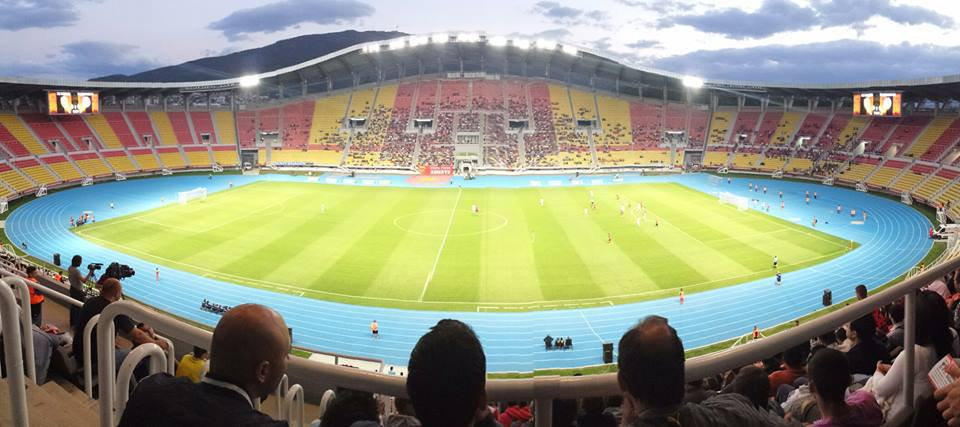
View from the south stand
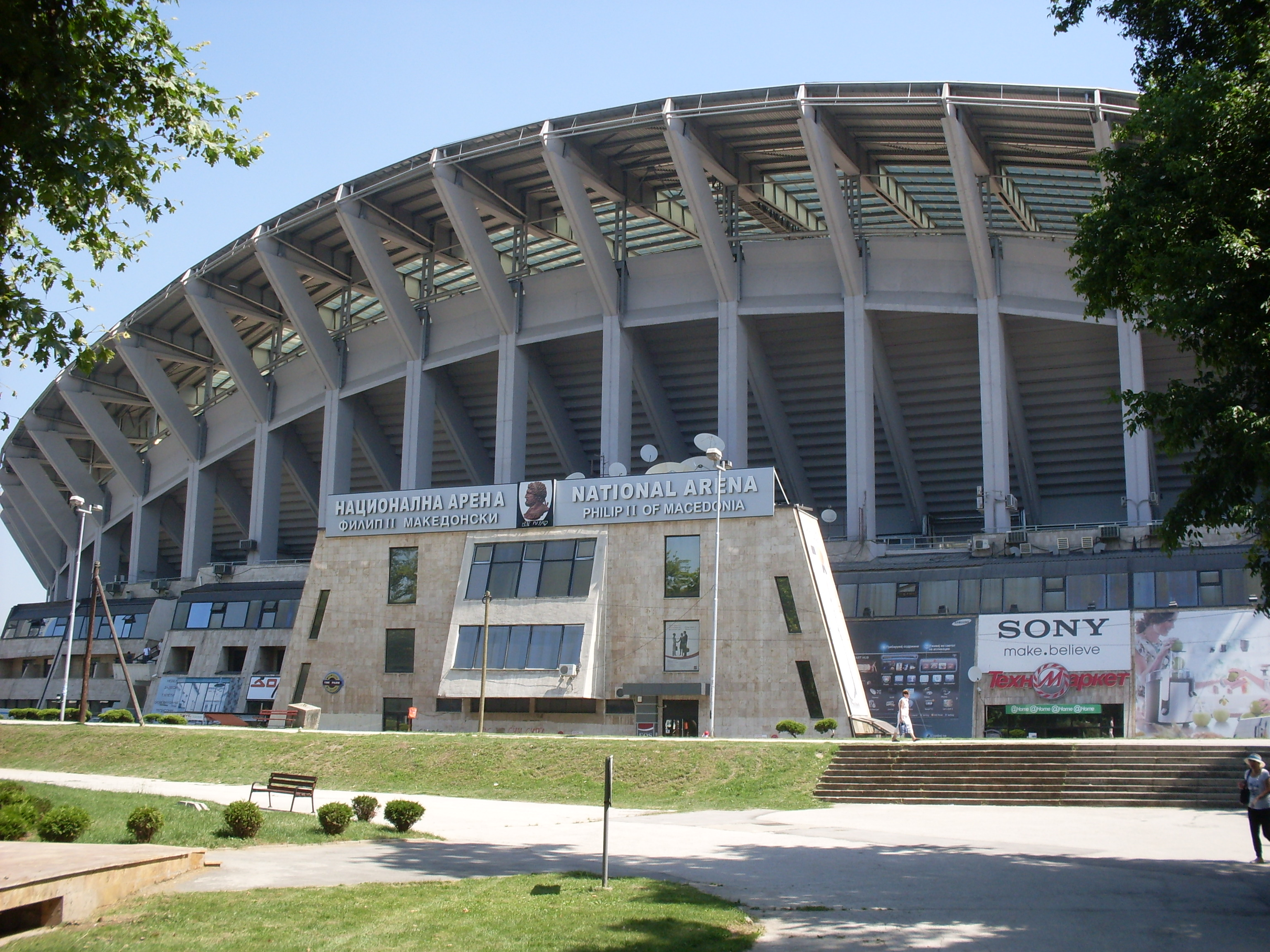
Exterior shot

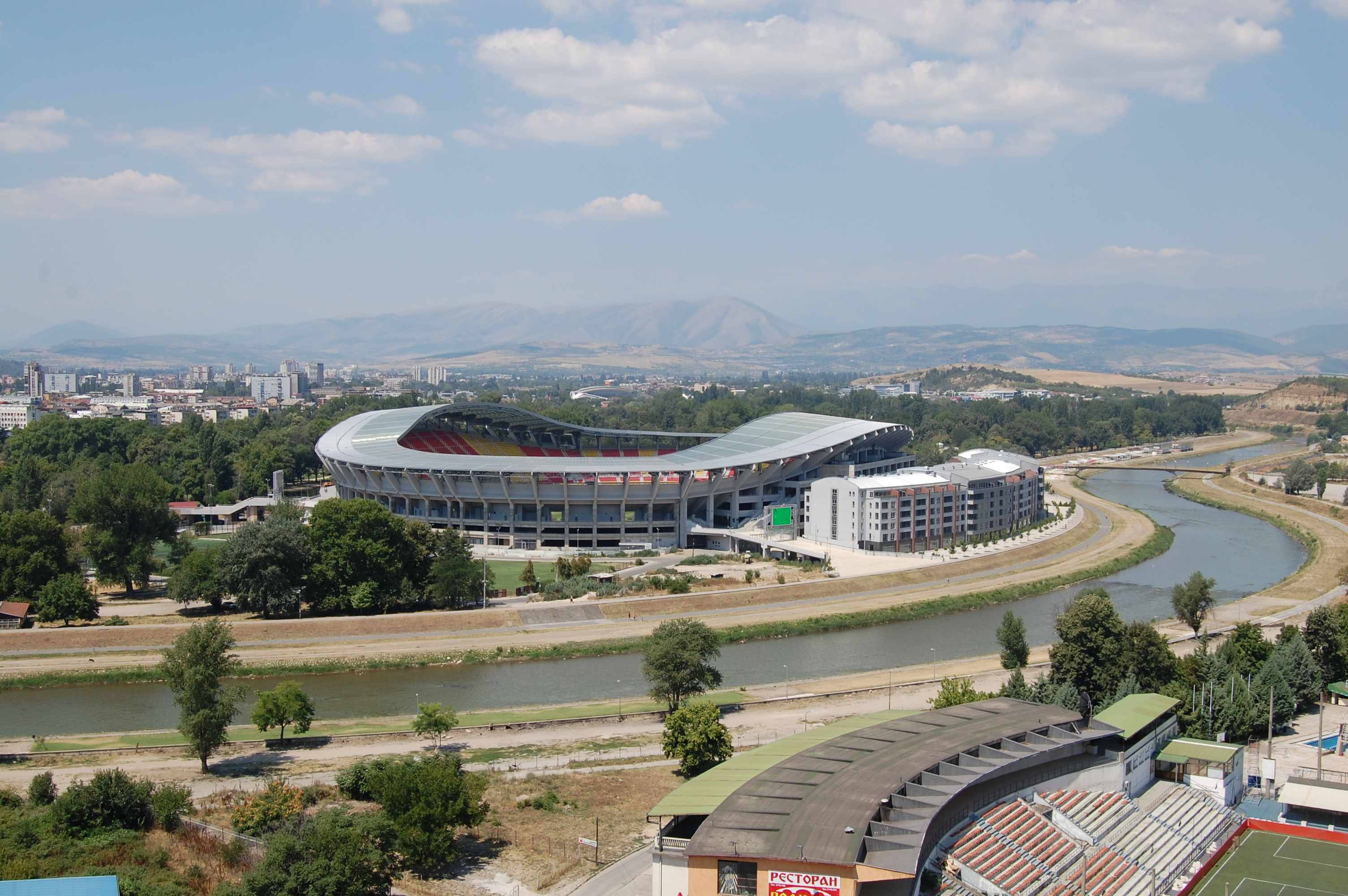
View from Skopje Fortress

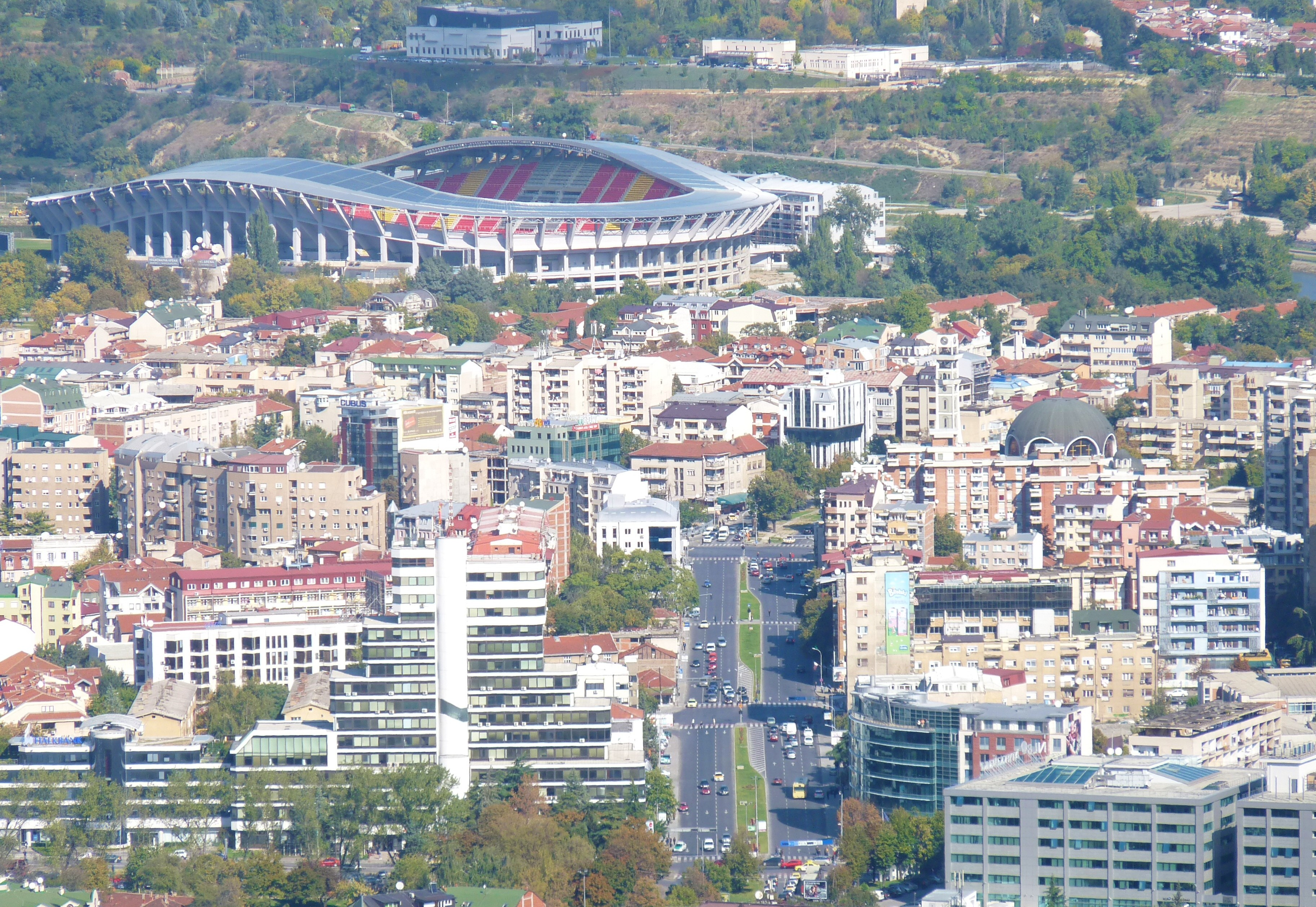
Skopje view of Kliment Ohridski boulevard and Toše Proeski Arena

Preceded by Lerkendal Stadion; Trondheim	UEFA Super Cup; Match venue 2017	Succeeded by A. Le Coq Arena; Tallinn
