= 2006–07 UEFA Cup qualifying rounds =

This article details the 2006–07 UEFA Cup qualifying rounds.

Times are CEST (UTC+2), as listed by UEFA (local times, if different, are in parentheses).

== Round and draw dates ==
All draws held at UEFA headquarters in Nyon, Switzerland.

Round	Draw date and time	First leg	Second leg
First qualifying round	23 June 2006	13 July 2006	27 July 2006
Second qualifying round	28 July 2006	10 August 2006	24 August 2006

Matches may also be played on Tuesdays or Wednesdays instead of the regular Thursdays due to scheduling conflicts.

== Teams ==
Regions used to divide teams in the qualifying rounds of the UEFA Cup: Northern Central–East Southern–Mediterranean

In total, 99 teams entered qualifying stage, which consisted of the following rounds:

- First qualifying round (70 teams): 70 teams which entered in this round.
- Second qualifying round (64 teams): 29 teams which entered in this round, and 35 winners of the first qualifying round.

The 32 winners of the second qualifying round qualified for the first round.

In the qualifying rounds, UEFA divided the participating teams into three geographical regions: Northern, Central–East, and Southern–Mediterranean. Teams were then seeded within their respective regions, rather than being seeded among all participating teams of the round. This meant that a club potentially seeded in an open draw format could be unseeded in the regional system, or vice versa. The regional allocation of countries was generally as follows:

- Northern: Belgium, Denmark, England, Estonia, Faroe Islands, Finland, Iceland, Latvia, Lithuania, Luxembourg, Netherlands, Northern Ireland, Norway, Republic of Ireland, Scotland, Sweden, Wales
- Central–East: Armenia, Austria, Azerbaijan, Belarus, Czech Republic, France, Georgia, Germany, Hungary, Kazakhstan, Liechtenstein, Moldova, Poland, Russia, Slovakia, Switzerland, Ukraine
- Southern–Mediterranean: Albania, Andorra, Bosnia and Herzegovina, Bulgaria, Croatia, Cyprus, Greece, Israel, Italy, Macedonia, Malta, Portugal, Romania, San Marino, Serbia, Slovenia, Spain, Turkey

However, UEFA could make exceptions to these allocations to ensure an even number of teams in each region.

Below are the 99 teams involved in the qualifying rounds, grouped by their starting rounds.

Key to colours
Winners of second qualifying round advanced to first round

Second qualifying round
Team	Region	Coeff.
(England) Newcastle United	NOR	75.950
(France) Auxerre	S–M	53.757
(Belgium) Club Brugge	NOR	49.981
(France) Marseille	C–E	48.757
(Germany) Hertha BSC	C–E	46.960
(Czech Republic) Slavia Prague	C–E	33.769
(Serbia) Partizan	S–M	30.600
(Poland) Wisła Kraków	C–E	29.104
(Israel) Hapoel Tel Aviv	S–M	26.108
(Switzerland) Grasshopper	C–E	23.537
(Netherlands) Twente	NOR	19.640
(Turkey) Trabzonspor	S–M	11.634
(Russia) Rubin Kazan	C–E	10.504
(Scotland) Gretna	NOR	10.023
(Ukraine) Metalurh Zaporizhzhia	C–E	9.777
(Norway) Molde	NOR	8.921
(Ukraine) Chornomorets Odesa	C–E	8.777
(Turkey) Kayserispor	S–M	8.634
(Denmark) Odense	NOR	8.593
(Switzerland) Sion	C–E	8.537
(Israel) Beitar Jerusalem	S–M	7.108
(Israel) Bnei Yehuda	S–M	7.108
(Austria) Ried	C–E	6.723
(Austria) Mattersburg	C–E	6.723
(Serbia) Hajduk Kula	S–M	6.600
(Serbia) OFK Beograd	S–M	6.600
(Poland) Wisła Płock	C–E	6.104
(Slovenia) Maribor	S–M	4.355
(Cyprus) Ethnikos Achna	S–M	3.355

First qualifying round
Team	Region	Coeff.
(Switzerland) Basel	C–E	49.537
(Romania) Rapid București	S–M	30.381
(Bulgaria) Litex Lovech	S–M	24.016
(Denmark) Brøndby	NOR	23.593
(Romania) Dinamo București	S–M	22.381
(Bulgaria) CSKA Sofia	S–M	21.016
(Slovakia) Artmedia Bratislava	C–E	13.070
(Belgium) Roeselare	S–M	9.981
(Croatia) Varteks	S–M	9.647
(Norway) Lyn	NOR	8.921
(Switzerland) Young Boys	C–E	8.537
(Bulgaria) Lokomotiv Sofia	S–M	8.016
(Norway) Brann	NOR	6.921
(Norway) Start	NOR	6.921
(Cyprus) APOEL	S–M	6.355
(Poland) Zagłębie Lubin	C–E	6.104
(Denmark) Randers	NOR	5.593
(Slovenia) Domžale	S–M	5.355
(Hungary) Fehérvár	C–E	4.840
(Hungary) Újpest	C–E	4.840
(Croatia) Rijeka	S–M	4.647
(Sweden) Gefle IF	NOR	4.372
(Sweden) IFK Göteborg	NOR	4.372
(Sweden) Åtvidabergs FF	NOR	4.372
(Slovakia) Spartak Trnava	C–E	4.070
(Bosnia and Herzegovina) Sarajevo	S–M	3.695
(Finland) Haka	NOR	3.433
(Latvia) Ventspils	NOR	3.365
(Slovenia) Koper	S–M	3.355
(Cyprus) Omonia	S–M	3.355
(Moldova) Zimbru Chișinău	C–E	3.255
(North Macedonia) Vardar	S–M	2.760
(Bosnia and Herzegovina) Orašje	S–M	2.695
(Finland) HJK	NOR	2.433
(Latvia) Skonto	NOR	2.365
(Moldova) Nistru Otaci	C–E	2.255
(Georgia (country)) Ameri Tbilisi	C–E	2.090
(Georgia (country)) WIT Georgia	C–E	2.090
(Lithuania) Kaunas	NOR	1.925
(Lithuania) Sūduva	NOR	1.925
(North Macedonia) Makedonija GP	S–M	1.760
(Iceland) Valur	NOR	1.595
(Iceland) ÍA	NOR	1.595
(Liechtenstein) Vaduz	C–E	1.485
(Belarus) BATE Borisov	C–E	1.457
(Belarus) Dinamo Minsk	C–E	1.457
(Republic of Ireland) Drogheda United	NOR	1.430
(Republic of Ireland) Derry City	NOR	1.430
(Albania) Tirana	S–M	1.210
(Albania) Dinamo Tirana	S–M	1.210
(Armenia) Mika	C–E	0.990
(Armenia) Banants	C–E	0.990
(Malta) Hibernians	S–M	0.880
(Malta) Sliema Wanderers	S–M	0.880
(Estonia) Levadia Tallinn	NOR	0.880
(Estonia) Flora	NOR	0.880
(Northern Ireland) Glentoran	NOR	0.770
(Northern Ireland) Portadown	NOR	0.770
(Wales) Rhyl	NOR	0.770
(Wales) Llanelli	NOR	0.770
(Azerbaijan) Qarabağ	C–E	0.660
(Azerbaijan) Karvan	C–E	0.660
(Luxembourg) Jeunesse Esch	NOR	0.605
(Luxembourg) Etzella Ettelbruck	NOR	0.605
(Faroe Islands) GÍ	NOR	0.550
(Faroe Islands) Skála	NOR	0.550
(Kazakhstan) Tobol	C–E	0.550
(Kazakhstan) Kairat	C–E	0.550
(Andorra) Rànger's	S–M	0.000
(San Marino) Murata	S–M	0.000

Notes

1. ^{IC} Teams transferred as winners from the Intertoto Cup third round
2. ^{†} Auxerre of France (usually in Central–East) were moved to the Southern–Mediterranean region.
3. ^{‡} Roeselare of Belgium (usually in Northern) were moved to the Southern–Mediterranean region for both the first and second qualifying rounds.

== First qualifying round ==
=== Seeding ===
Teams were split into regional groups, each with a seeded and unseeded pot, for the draw.

Southern–Mediterranean region		Central–East region		Northern region	
Seeded	Unseeded	Seeded	Unseeded	Seeded	Unseeded
(Romania) Rapid București; (Bulgaria) Litex Lovech; (Romania) Dinamo București; (Bulgaria) CSKA Sofia; (Belgium) Roeselare; (Croatia) Varteks; (Bulgaria) Lokomotiv Sofia; (Cyprus) APOEL; (Slovenia) Domžale; (Croatia) Rijeka; (Bosnia and Herzegovina) Sarajevo	(Cyprus) Omonia; (Slovenia) Koper; (Bosnia and Herzegovina) Orašje; (North Macedonia) Vardar; (North Macedonia) Makedonija GP; (Albania) Tirana; (Albania) Dinamo Tirana; (Malta) Hibernians; (Malta) Sliema Wanderers; (Andorra) Rànger's; (San Marino) Murata	(Switzerland) Basel; (Slovakia) Artmedia Bratislava; (Switzerland) Young Boys; (Poland) Zagłębie Lubin; (Hungary) Fehérvár; (Hungary) Újpest; (Slovakia) Spartak Trnava; (Moldova) Zimbru Chișinău; (Moldova) Nistru Otaci; (Georgia (country)) Ameri Tbilisi	(Georgia (country)) WIT Georgia; (Liechtenstein) Vaduz; (Belarus) BATE Borisov; (Belarus) Dinamo Minsk; (Armenia) Mika; (Armenia) Banants; (Azerbaijan) Qarabağ; (Azerbaijan) Karvan; (Kazakhstan) Tobol; (Kazakhstan) Kairat	(Denmark) Brøndby; (Norway) Lyn; (Norway) Start; (Norway) Brann; (Denmark) Randers; (Sweden) IFK Göteborg; (Sweden) Åtvidabergs FF; (Sweden) Gefle IF; (Finland) Haka; (Latvia) Ventspils; (Finland) HJK; (Latvia) Skonto; (Lithuania) Kaunas; (Lithuania) Sūduva	(Iceland) Valur; (Iceland) ÍA; (Republic of Ireland) Derry City; (Republic of Ireland) Drogheda United; (Estonia) Flora; (Estonia) Levadia Tallinn; (Northern Ireland) Glentoran; (Northern Ireland) Portadown; (Wales) Rhyl; (Wales) Llanelli; (Luxembourg) Jeunesse Esch; (Luxembourg) Etzella Ettelbruck; (Faroe Islands) GÍ; (Faroe Islands) Skála

=== Summary ===
These matches were held on 13 July and 27 July 2006.

Team 1	Agg.	Team 2	1st leg	2nd leg
Southern–Mediterranean region
Varteks (Croatia)	1–3	(Albania) Tirana	1–1	0–2
Dinamo Tirana (Albania)	1–5	(Bulgaria) CSKA Sofia	0–1	1–4
Koper (Slovenia)	0–6	(Bulgaria) Litex Lovech	0–1	0–5
Sarajevo (Bosnia and Herzegovina)	5–0	(Andorra) Rànger's	3–0	2–0
Orašje (Bosnia and Herzegovina)	0–7	(Slovenia) Domžale	0–2	0–5
Hibernians (Malta)	1–9	(Romania) Dinamo București	0–4	1–5
APOEL (Cyprus)	7–1	(San Marino) Murata	3–1	4–0
Rijeka (Croatia)	3–4	(Cyprus) Omonia	2–2	1–2
Lokomotiv Sofia (Bulgaria)	3–1	(North Macedonia) Makedonija GP	2–0	1–1
Vardar (North Macedonia)	2–7	(Belgium) Roeselare	1–2	1–5
Rapid București (Romania)	6–0	(Malta) Sliema Wanderers	5–0	1–0
Central–East region
Újpest (Hungary)	1–4	(Liechtenstein) Vaduz	0–4	1–0
Zimbru Chișinău (Moldova)	3–2	(Azerbaijan) Qarabağ	1–1	2–1 (a.e.t.)
Mika (Armenia)	1–4	(Switzerland) Young Boys	1–3	0–1
Fehérvár (Hungary)	2–2 (a)	(Kazakhstan) Kairat	1–0	1–2
Zagłębie Lubin (Poland)	1–1 (a)	(Belarus) Dinamo Minsk	1–1	0–0
Karvan (Azerbaijan)	2–0	(Slovakia) Spartak Trnava	1–0	1–0
Ameri Tbilisi (Georgia (country))	2–2 (a)	(Armenia) Banants	0–1	2–1
BATE Borisov (Belarus)	3–0	(Moldova) Nistru Otaci	2–0	1–0
Basel (Switzerland)	3–1	(Kazakhstan) Tobol	3–1	0–0
Artmedia Bratislava (Slovakia)	3–2	(Georgia (country)) WIT Georgia	2–0	1–2
Northern region
HJK (Finland)	2–4	(Republic of Ireland) Drogheda United	1–1	1–3 (a.e.t.)
Brøndby (Denmark)	3–1	(Iceland) Valur	3–1	0–0
Gefle IF (Sweden)	1–2	(Wales) Llanelli	1–2	0–0
Jeunesse Esch (Luxembourg)	0–5	(Latvia) Skonto	0–2	0–3
Åtvidabergs FF (Sweden)	7–0	(Luxembourg) Etzella Ettelbruck	4–0	3–0
Ventspils (Latvia)	4–1	(Faroe Islands) GÍ	2–1	2–0
Glentoran (Northern Ireland)	0–2	(Norway) Brann	0–1	0–1
Randers (Denmark)	2–2 (a)	(Iceland) ÍA	1–0	1–2
Portadown (Northern Ireland)	1–4	(Lithuania) Kaunas	1–3	0–1
Rhyl (Wales)	1–2	(Lithuania) Sūduva	0–0	1–2
Levadia Tallinn (Estonia)	2–1	(Finland) Haka	2–0	0–1
Skála (Faroe Islands)	0–4	(Norway) Start	0–1	0–3
Lyn (Norway)	1–1 (a)	(Estonia) Flora	1–1	0–0
IFK Göteborg (Sweden)	0–2	(Republic of Ireland) Derry City	0–1	0–1

=== Southern–Mediterranean region ===
13 July 2006

Varteks (Croatia)	1–1	(Albania) Tirana
Novinić 47'	Report	Muka 21'

Stadion Varteks, Varaždin
Attendance: 1,500
Referee: Björn Kuipers (Netherlands)
27 July 2006

Tirana (Albania)	2–0	(Croatia) Varteks
Salihi 47'; Merkoçi 90'	Report

Selman Stërmasi stadium, Tirana
Attendance: 3,500
Referee: Iraklis Tsikinis (Greece)

Tirana won 3–1 on aggregate.

13 July 2006

Dinamo Tirana (Albania)	0–1	(Bulgaria) CSKA Sofia
	Report	Trica 86'

Selman Stërmasi stadium, Tirana
Attendance: 1,000
Referee: Haim Jakov (Israel)
27 July 2006

CSKA Sofia (Bulgaria)	4–1	(Albania) Dinamo Tirana
Trica 36', 53'; Furtado 49'; Petre 75'	Report	Kastel 12'

Balgarska Armiya Stadium, Sofia
Attendance: 4,321
Referee: János Megyebíró (Hungary)

CSKA Sofia won 5–1 on aggregate.

13 July 2006

Koper (Slovenia)	0–1	(Bulgaria) Litex Lovech
	Report	Kirilov 17'

Sports Park, Domžale
Attendance: 610
Referee: Adrian Casha (Moldova)
27 July 2006

Litex Lovech (Bulgaria)	5–0	(Slovenia) Koper
Sandrinho 20' (pen.); Novaković 62'; Jelenković 85'; Lubenov 90+1'; Genchev 90+3'	Report

Lovech Stadium, Lovech
Attendance: 2,719
Referee: Leontios Trattou (Cyprus)

Litex Lovech won 6–0 on aggregate.

13 July 2006

Sarajevo (Bosnia and Herzegovina)	3–0	(Andorra) Rànger's
Obuća 20', 30'; Duro 45'	Report

Asim Ferhatović Hase Stadium, Sarajevo
Attendance: 2,023
Referee: Richard Havrilla (Slovakia)
27 July 2006

Rànger's (Andorra)	0–2	(Bosnia and Herzegovina) Sarajevo
	Report	Hadžić 10'; Obuća 45'

Estadi Comunal d'Andorra la Vella, Andorra la Vella
Attendance: 200
Referee: Stefano Podeschi (Italy)

Sarajevo won 5–0 on aggregate.

13 July 2006

Orašje (Bosnia and Herzegovina)	0–2	(Slovenia) Domžale
	Report	Juninho 30'; Aljančič 39'

Gradski Stadion Orašje, Orašje
Attendance: 2,200
Referee: Alexandru Deaconu (Romania)
27 July 2006

Domžale (Slovenia)	5–0	(Bosnia and Herzegovina) Orašje
Ljubijankić 13', 75'; Djukić 21', 41'; Rakovič 61'	Report

Sports Park, Domžale
Attendance: 1,100
Referee: Yunus Yıldırım (Turkey)

Domžale won 7–0 on aggregate.

13 July 2006

Hibernians (Malta)	0–4	(Romania) Dinamo București
	Report	Danciulescu 4'; Niculescu 57', 58'; Radu 83'

Ta' Qali National Stadium, Ta' Qali
Attendance: 252
Referee: Igor Zakharov (Russia)
27 July 2006

Dinamo București (Romania)	5–1	(Malta) Hibernians
Cristea 54'; Danciulescu 61', 84'; Munteanu 90+1'; Buzurović 90+3' (o.g.)	Report	Buzurović 86'

Stadionul Dinamo, Bucharest
Attendance: 4,500
Referee: Vlado Svilokos (Croatia)

Dinamo București won 9–1 on aggregate.

13 July 2006

APOEL (Cyprus)	3–1	(San Marino) Murata
Neophytou 34' (pen.); Georgiou 58'; Eleftheriou 82'	Report	Protti 51'

GSP Stadium, Nicosia
Attendance: 6,489
Referee: Sebastian Colţescu (Romania)
27 July 2006

Murata (San Marino)	0–4	(Cyprus) APOEL
	Report	Georgiou 15'; Fernandes 22'; Neophytou 25'; Michael 90+1' (pen.)

Stadio Olimpico, Serravalle
Attendance: 667
Referee: Arman Amirkhanyan (Armenia)

APOEL won 7–1 on aggregate.

13 July 2006

Rijeka (Croatia)	2–2	(Cyprus) Omonia
Bule 9'; Kerkez 50' (pen.)	Report	Vakouftsis 31' (pen.); Grozdanovski 54'

Stadion na Kantridi, Rijeka
Attendance: 4,622
Referee: Marcin Borski (Poland)
27 July 2006

Omonia (Cyprus)	2–1	(Croatia) Rijeka
Mguni 61', 88'	Report	Lukunić 78'

GSP Stadium, Nicosia
Attendance: 14,000
Referee: Mark Clattenburg (England)

Omonia won 4–3 on aggregate.

13 July 2006

Lokomotiv Sofia (Bulgaria)	2–0	(North Macedonia) Makedonija GP
Paskov 60' (pen.); Karadzhinov 86'	Report

Balgarska Armiya Stadium, Sofia
Attendance: 1,800
Referee: Thomas Vejlgaard (Denmark)
27 July 2006

Makedonija GP (North Macedonia)	1–1	(Bulgaria) Lokomotiv Sofia
Ismaili 25'	Report	Genkov 69'

Gradski Stadion Skopje, Skopje
Attendance: 5,000
Referee: Paulo Paraty (Portugal)

Lokomotiv Sofia won 3–1 on aggregate.

13 July 2006

Vardar (North Macedonia)	1–2	(Belgium) Roeselare
Ristovski 1'	Report	Malki 32'; Oyen 39'

Gradski Stadion Skopje, Skopje
Attendance: 2,000
Referee: Ferenc Bede (Hungary)
27 July 2006

Roeselare (Belgium)	5–1	(North Macedonia) Vardar
Malki 13'; Dufoor 20', 30', 74'; Vanderbiest 64' (pen.)	Report	Wandeir 52'

Schiervelde Stadion, Roeselare
Attendance: 3,731
Referee: Babak Guliyev (Azerbaijan)

Roeselare won 7–2 on aggregate.

13 July 2006

Rapid București (Romania)	5–0	(Malta) Sliema Wanderers
Grigore 5'; Carabott 15' (o.g.); N. Constantin 22'; Buga 41'; Said 44' (o.g.)	Report

Stadionul Giulești-Valentin Stănescu, Bucharest
Attendance: 6,000
Referee: Asaf Kenan (Israel)
27 July 2006

Sliema Wanderers (Malta)	0–1	(Romania) Rapid București
	Report	Buga 11'

Ta' Qali National Stadium, Ta' Qali
Attendance: 200
Referee: Milan Karadžić (Serbia)

Rapid București won 6–0 on aggregate.

=== Central–East region ===
13 July 2006

Újpest (Hungary)	0–4	(Liechtenstein) Vaduz
	Report	Faye 14', 63'; Akdemir 31'; Sara 90'

Stadium Puskás Ferenc, Budapest
Attendance: 3,763
Referee: Svein Oddvar Moen (Norway)
27 July 2006

Vaduz (Liechtenstein)	0–1	(Hungary) Újpest
	Report	Tóth 55'

Rheinpark Stadion, Vaduz
Attendance: 1,150
Referee: Cüneyt Çakır (Turkey)

Vaduz won 4–1 on aggregate.

13 July 2006

Zimbru Chișinău (Moldova)	1–1	(Azerbaijan) Qarabağ
Petrosyan 75'	Report	Musayev 68'

Zimbru Stadium, Chișinău
Attendance: 2,000
Referee: Dejan Delević (Serbia)
27 July 2006

Qarabağ (Azerbaijan)	1–2 (a.e.t.)	(Moldova) Zimbru Chișinău
Musayev 23'	Report	Chirilov 52'; Bălașa 100'

Shafa Stadium, Baku
Attendance: 8,000
Referee: Rusmir Mrković (Bosnia and Herzegovina)

Zimbru Chișinău won 3–2 on aggregate.

13 July 2006

Mika (Armenia)	1–3	(Switzerland) Young Boys
Grigoryan 90'	Report	Marcos 22'; Raimondi 50'; Sermeter 86'

Hanrapetakan Stadium, Yerevan
Attendance: 7,500
Referee: Pavel Saliy (Kazakhstan)
27 July 2006

Young Boys (Switzerland)	1–0	(Armenia) Mika
Häberli 85'	Report

Wankdorf, Bern
Attendance: 6,432
Referee: Sokol Jareci (Albania)

Young Boys won 4–1 on aggregate.

13 July 2006

Fehérvár (Hungary)	1–0	(Kazakhstan) Kairat
Dvéri 8'	Report

Stadion Sóstói, Székesfehérvár
Attendance: 2,721
Referee: Emil Laursen (Denmark)
27 July 2006

Kairat (Kazakhstan)	2–1	(Hungary) Fehérvár
Buleshev 75'; Smakov 86' (pen.)	Report	Sitku 34'

Almaty Central Stadium, Almaty
Attendance: 7,500
Referee: Augustus Constantin (Romania)

2–2 on aggregate; Fehérvár won on away goals.

13 July 2006

Zagłębie Lubin (Poland)	1–1	(Belarus) Dinamo Minsk
Łobodziński 67'	Report	Kovel 73'

Stadion Zagłębia Lubin, Lubin
Attendance: 3,526
Referee: Ismet Arzuman (Turkey)
27 July 2006

Dinamo Minsk (Belarus)	0–0	(Poland) Zagłębie Lubin
	Report

Dinamo Stadium, Minsk
Attendance: 3,586
Referee: Vusal Aliyev (Azerbaijan)

1–1 on aggregate; Dinamo Minsk won on away goals.

13 July 2006

Karvan (Azerbaijan)	1–0	(Slovakia) Spartak Trnava
Muradov 82'	Report

Shafa Stadium, Baku
Attendance: 2,000
Referee: Goran Spirkoski (Macedonia)
27 July 2006

Spartak Trnava (Slovakia)	0–1	(Azerbaijan) Karvan
	Report	Camara 12'

National Training Centre, Senec
Attendance: 1,842
Referee: Adrian McCourt (Northern Ireland)

Karvan won 2–0 on aggregate.

13 July 2006

Ameri Tbilisi (Georgia (country))	0–1	(Armenia) Banants
	Report	Tadevosyan 10'

Mikheil Meskhi Stadium, Tbilisi
Attendance: 2,000
Referee: Albert Toussaint (Luxembourg)
27 July 2006

Banants (Armenia)	1–2	(Georgia (country)) Ameri Tbilisi
Tadevosyan 38'	Report	Tsinamdzgvrishvili 60'; Dobrovolski 62'

Hanrapetakan Stadium, Yerevan
Attendance: 4,000
Referee: Hristo Ristoskov (Bulgaria)

2–2 on aggregate; Ameri Tbilisi won on away goals.

13 July 2006

BATE Borisov (Belarus)	2–0	(Moldova) Nistru Otaci
Stasevich 55'; Molosh 76' (pen.)	Report

Haradski Stadium, Barysaw
Attendance: 4,000
Referee: Sten Kaldma (Estonia)
27 July 2006

Nistru Otaci (Moldova)	0–1	(Belarus) BATE Borisov
	Report	Bliznyuk 30'

Stadionul Republican, Chișinău
Attendance: 1,000
Referee: Libor Kovařík (Czech Republic)

BATE Borisov won 3–0 on aggregate.

13 July 2006
20:00

Basel (Switzerland)	3–1	(Kazakhstan) Tobol
Petrić 20', 67' (pen.); Eduardo 69'	Report	Zhumaskaliyev 49'

St. Jakob-Park, Basel
Attendance: 11,643
Referee: Jorge Sousa (Portugal)
27 July 2006
15:00

Tobol (Kazakhstan)	0–0	(Switzerland) Basel
	Report

Kostanay Central Stadium, Kostanay
Attendance: 8,000
Referee: Luc Wilmes (Luxembourg)

Basel won 3–1 on aggregate.

13 July 2006

Artmedia Bratislava (Slovakia)	2–0	(Georgia (country)) WIT Georgia
Hartig 10'; Reiter 51'	Report

Tehelné pole, Bratislava
Attendance: 861
Referee: Robert Krajnc (Slovenia)
27 July 2006

WIT Georgia (Georgia (country))	2–1	(Slovakia) Artmedia Bratislava
Lomaia 44'; Razmadze 88' (pen.)	Report	Halenár 48'

Lokomotivi Stadium, Tbilisi
Attendance: 1,200
Referee: Ioannis Tsaheilids (Greece)

Artmedia Bratislava won 3–2 on aggregate.

=== Northern region ===
13 July 2006

HJK (Finland)	1–1	(Republic of Ireland) Drogheda United
Halsti 83'	Report	Robinson 41'

Finnair Stadium, Helsinki
Attendance: 2,467
Referee: Audrius Zuta (Lithuania)
27 July 2006

Drogheda United (Republic of Ireland)	3–1 (a.e.t.)	(Finland) HJK
Gartland 57'; Lynch 96', 114'	Report	Ghazi 36'

Dalymount Park, Dublin
Attendance: 3,750
Referee: José Prades (Andorra)

Drogheda United won 4–2 on aggregate.

13 July 2006

Brøndby (Denmark)	3–1	(Iceland) Valur
T.Rasmussen 8'; M. Rasmussen 32'; Ericsson 34'	Report	Gunnlaugsson 83'

Brøndby Stadium, Brøndbyvester
Attendance: 6,338
Referee: Draženko Kovačić (Croatia)
27 July 2006

Valur (Iceland)	0–0	(Denmark) Brøndby
	Report

Laugardalsvöllur, Reykjavík
Attendance: 1,627
Referee: Anthony Buttimer (Republic of Ireland)

Brøndby won 3–1 on aggregate.

13 July 2006

Gefle IF (Sweden)	1–2	(Wales) Llanelli
Viikmäe 24'	Report	Griffiths 82'; Mignorance 87'

Råsunda Stadium, Solna
Attendance: 839
Referee: Sergey Tsaregradskiyi (Kazakhstan)
27 July 2006

Llanelli (Wales)	0–0	(Sweden) Gefle IF
	Report

Stradey Park, Llanelli
Attendance: 3,250
Referee: Aleksei Kulbakov (Belarus)

Llanelli won 2–1 on aggregate.

13 July 2006

Jeunesse Esch (Luxembourg)	0–2	(Latvia) Skonto
	Report	Piaček 48'; Štolcers 79'

Stade de la Frontière, Esch-sur-Alzette
Attendance: 850
Referee: Panayiotis Kailis (Cyprus)
27 July 2006

Skonto (Latvia)	3–0	(Luxembourg) Jeunesse Esch
Miholaps 21', 27' (pen.); Štolcers 83'	Report

Skonto Stadium, Riga
Attendance: 2,193
Referee: Aleksandar Stavrev (Macedonia)

Skonto won 5–0 on aggregate.

13 July 2006

Åtvidabergs FF (Sweden)	4–0	(Luxembourg) Etzella Ettelbruck
Johansson 12'; Karlsson 41', 47', 55'	Report

Idrottsparken, Norrköping
Attendance: 1,020
Referee: Vyacheslav Zhukov (Ukraine)
27 July 2006

Etzella Ettelbruck (Luxembourg)	0–3	(Sweden) Åtvidabergs FF
	Report	Jönsson 61'; Johansson 70' (pen.); C. Karlsson 80' (pen.)

Stade Am Deich, Ettelbruck
Attendance: 354
Referee: Gabriele Rossi (San Marino)

Åtvidabergs FF won 7–0 on aggregate.

13 July 2006

Ventspils (Latvia)	2–1	(Faroe Islands) GÍ
Ndeki 23', 65'	Report	S. Jacobsen 29'

Ventspils Olimpiskais Stadions, Ventspils
Attendance: 550
Referee: Lasha Silagava (Georgia)
27 July 2006

GÍ (Faroe Islands)	0–2	(Latvia) Ventspils
	Report	Rimkus 75', 77'

Svangaskarð, Toftir
Attendance: 386
Referee: Hannes Kaasik (Finland)

Ventspils won 4–1 on aggregate.

13 July 2006

Glentoran (Northern Ireland)	0–1	(Norway) Brann
	Report	Memelli 69'

The Oval, Belfast
Attendance: 1,743
Referee: Anders Hermansen (Denmark)
27 July 2006

Brann (Norway)	1–0	(Northern Ireland) Glentoran
Bjarnason 85' (pen.)	Report

Brann Stadion, Bergen
Attendance: 3,584
Referee: Jérôme Laperrière (Switzerland)

Brann won 2–0 on aggregate.

13 July 2006

Randers (Denmark)	1–0	(Iceland) ÍA
Alex 64'	Report

Essex Park Randers, Randers
Attendance: 4,680
Referee: Valery Vyalichka (Belarus)
27 July 2006

ÍA (Iceland)	2–1	(Denmark) Randers
Hjartarson 27'; B. Guðjónsson 90+2' (pen.)	Report	Johansen 29'

Akranesvöllur, Akranes
Attendance: 650
Referee: Dietmar Drabek (Austria)

2–2 on aggregate; Randers won on away goals.

13 July 2006

Portadown (Northern Ireland)	1–3	(Lithuania) Kaunas
McCutcheon 65'	Report	Manchkava 2'; Pehlić 9'; Velička 46'

Shamrock Park, Portadown
Attendance: 548
Referee: Daniel Stålhammar (Sweden)
27 July 2006

Kaunas (Lithuania)	1–0	(Northern Ireland) Portadown
Ivaškevičius 43'	Report

S. Darius and S. Girėnas Stadium, Kaunas
Attendance: 3,060
Referee: Johannes Valgeirsson (Iceland)

Kaunas won 4–1 on aggregate.

13 July 2006

Rhyl (Wales)	0–0	(Lithuania) Sūduva
	Report

Belle Vue, Rhyl
Attendance: 1,475
Referee: Lassin Isaksen (Faroe Islands)
27 July 2006

Sūduva (Lithuania)	2–1	(Wales) Rhyl
Maciulevičius 18' (pen.); Mikuckis 25'	Report	Grigas 80' (o.g.)

Sūduva Stadium, Marijampolė
Attendance: 2,000
Referee: Goran Mihaljevic (Macedonia)

Sūduva won 2–1 on aggregate.

13 July 2006

Levadia Tallinn (Estonia)	2–0	(Finland) Haka
Purje 32', 36'	Report

Kadriorg Stadium, Tallinn
Attendance: 2,150
Referee: Stanislav Todorov (Bulgaria)
27 July 2006

Haka (Finland)	1–0	(Estonia) Levadia Tallinn
Innanen 4'	Report

Tehtaan kenttä, Valkeakoski
Attendance: 1,234
Referee: Andriy Shandor (Ukraine)

Levadia Tallinn won 2–1 on aggregate.

13 July 2006

Skála (Faroe Islands)	0–1	(Norway) Start
	Report	Johnsen 3'

Svangaskarð, Toftir
Attendance: 720
Referee: Brian Lawlor (Wales)
27 July 2006

Start (Norway)	3–0	(Faroe Islands) Skála
Bärlin 42'; Pedersen 51'; Wright 78'	Report

Kristiansand Stadion, Kristiansand
Attendance: 1,470
Referee: Dimitar Dimitrov (Bulgaria)

Start won 4–0 on aggregate.

13 July 2006

Lyn (Norway)	1–1	(Estonia) Flora
Tessem 42' (pen.)	Report	Lindpere 81'

Ullevaal Stadion, Oslo
Attendance: 510
Referee: Calum Murray (Scotland)
27 July 2006

Flora (Estonia)	0–0	(Norway) Lyn
	Report

A. Le Coq Arena, Tallinn
Attendance: 1,500
Referee: Csaba Sápi (Hungary)

1–1 on aggregate; Flora won on away goals.

13 July 2006

IFK Göteborg (Sweden)	0–1	(Republic of Ireland) Derry City
	Report	Hargan 80'

Ullevi, Gothenburg
Attendance: 3,350
Referee: Ghennadi Sidenco (Moldova)
27 July 2006

Derry City (Republic of Ireland)	1–0	(Sweden) IFK Göteborg
O'Flynn 32' (pen.)	Report

Brandywell Stadium, Derry
Attendance: 2,650
Referee: Garðar Örn Hinriksson (Iceland)

Derry City won 2–0 on aggregate.

== Second qualifying round ==
=== Seeding ===
Teams were split into regional groups, each with a seeded and unseeded pot, for the draw.

Southern–Mediterranean Group 1		Southern–Mediterranean Group 2	
Seeded	Unseeded	Seeded	Unseeded
(France) Auxerre; (Israel) Hapoel Tel Aviv; (Bulgaria) CSKA Sofia; (Turkey) Trabzonspor; (Belgium) Roeselare	(Serbia) Hajduk Kula; (Serbia) OFK Beograd; (Cyprus) APOEL; (Slovenia) Domžale; (Cyprus) Ethnikos Achna	(Serbia) Partizan; (Romania) Rapid București; (Bulgaria) Litex Lovech; (Romania) Dinamo București; (Turkey) Kayserispor; (Bulgaria) Lokomotiv Sofia	(Israel) Beitar Jerusalem; (Israel) Bnei Yehuda; (Slovenia) Maribor; (Bosnia and Herzegovina) Sarajevo; (Cyprus) Omonia; (Albania) Tirana
Central–East Group 1		Central–East Group 2	
Seeded	Unseeded	Seeded	Unseeded
(Switzerland) Basel; (Czech Republic) Slavia Prague; (Switzerland) Grasshopper; (Slovakia) Artmedia Bratislava; (Ukraine) Chornomorets Odesa; (Switzerland) Sion	(Austria) Ried; (Poland) Wisła Płock; (Hungary) Fehérvár; (Liechtenstein) Vaduz; (Belarus) Dinamo Minsk; (Azerbaijan) Karvan	(France) Marseille; (Germany) Hertha BSC; (Poland) Wisła Kraków; (Russia) Rubin Kazan; (Ukraine) Metalurh Zaporizhzhia	(Switzerland) Young Boys; (Austria) Mattersburg; (Moldova) Zimbru Chișinău; (Georgia (country)) Ameri Tbilisi; (Belarus) BATE Borisov
Northern Group 1		Northern Group 2	
Seeded	Unseeded	Seeded	Unseeded
(England) Newcastle United; (Netherlands) Twente; (Denmark) Odense; (Norway) Start; (Denmark) Randers	(Latvia) Ventspils; (Lithuania) Kaunas; (Republic of Ireland) Drogheda United; (Estonia) Levadia Tallinn; (Wales) Llanelli	(Belgium) Club Brugge; (Denmark) Brøndby; (Scotland) Gretna; (Norway) Molde; (Norway) Brann	(Sweden) Åtvidabergs FF; (Latvia) Skonto; (Lithuania) Sūduva; (Republic of Ireland) Derry City; (Estonia) Flora

=== Summary ===
These matches were held on 8 and 10 August (first leg) and 24 August (second leg) 2006.

Team 1	Agg.	Team 2	1st leg	2nd leg
Southern–Mediterranean region
APOEL (Cyprus)	1–2	(Turkey) Trabzonspor	1–1	0–1
Hapoel Tel Aviv (Israel)	4–2	(Slovenia) Domžale	1–2	3–0
CSKA Sofia (Bulgaria)	1–1 (a)	(Serbia) Hajduk Kula	0–0	1–1 (a.e.t.)
Roeselare (Belgium)	2–6	(Cyprus) Ethnikos Achna	2–1	0–5
OFK Beograd (Serbia)	2–5	(France) Auxerre	1–0	1–5
Dinamo București (Romania)	2–1	(Israel) Beitar Jerusalem	1–0	1–1
Partizan (Serbia)	3–2	(Slovenia) Maribor	2–1	1–1
Sarajevo (Bosnia and Herzegovina)	1–2	(Romania) Rapid București	1–0	0–2
Bnei Yehuda (Israel)	0–6	(Bulgaria) Lokomotiv Sofia	0–2	0–4
Omonia (Cyprus)	1–2	(Bulgaria) Litex Lovech	0–0	1–2
Tirana (Albania)	1–5	(Turkey) Kayserispor	0–2	1–3
Central–East region
Artmedia Bratislava (Slovakia)	5–3	(Belarus) Dinamo Minsk	2–1	3–2
Ried (Austria)	0–1	(Switzerland) Sion	0–0	0–1
Fehérvár (Hungary)	1–3	(Switzerland) Grasshopper	1–1	0–2
Karvan (Azerbaijan)	0–2	(Czech Republic) Slavia Prague	0–2	0–0
Chornomorets Odesa (Ukraine)	1–1 (a)	(Poland) Wisła Płock	0–0	1–1
Basel (Switzerland)	2–2 (a)	(Liechtenstein) Vaduz	1–0	1–2
Zimbru Chișinău (Moldova)	0–3	(Ukraine) Metalurh Zaporizhzhia	0–0	0–3
Mattersburg (Austria)	1–2	(Poland) Wisła Kraków	1–1	0–1
Hertha BSC (Germany)	3–2	(Georgia (country)) Ameri Tbilisi	1–0	2–2
Rubin Kazan (Russia)	5–0	(Belarus) BATE Borisov	3–0	2–0
Young Boys (Switzerland)	3–3 (a)	(France) Marseille	3–3	0–0
Northern region
Start (Norway)	1–1 (11–10 p)	(Republic of Ireland) Drogheda United	1–0	0–1 (a.e.t.)
Odense (Denmark)	6–1	(Wales) Llanelli	1–0	5–1
Randers (Denmark)	3–2	(Lithuania) Kaunas	3–1	0–1
Twente (Netherlands)	1–2	(Estonia) Levadia Tallinn	1–1	0–1
Ventspils (Latvia)	0–1	(England) Newcastle United	0–1	0–0
Brann (Norway)	4–4 (a)	(Sweden) Åtvidabergs FF	3–3	1–1
Molde (Norway)	2–1	(Latvia) Skonto	0–0	2–1
Flora (Estonia)	0–4	(Denmark) Brøndby	0–0	0–4
Sūduva (Lithuania)	2–7	(Belgium) Club Brugge	0–2	2–5
Gretna (Scotland)	3–7	(Republic of Ireland) Derry City	1–5	2–2

=== Southern–Mediterranean region ===
10 August 2006

APOEL (Cyprus)	1–1	(Turkey) Trabzonspor
Fernandes 2'	Report	Yattara 90'

GSP Stadium, Nicosia
Attendance: 17,048
Referee: Julián Rodríguez Santiago (Spain)
24 August 2006
20:45

Trabzonspor (Turkey)	1–0	(Cyprus) APOEL
Riza 87'	Report

Hüseyin Avni Aker Stadium, Trabzon
Attendance: 13,993
Referee: Michael Weiner (Germany)

Trabzonspor won 2–1 on aggregate.

10 August 2006

Hapoel Tel Aviv (Israel)	1–2	(Slovenia) Domžale
De Bruno 42'	Report	Ljubijankić 65' (pen.), 90+1'

Koning Willem II Stadion, Tilburg, Netherlands (Note: Due to the armed conflict going on in Israel, UEFA decided that no European matches could be staged in the country until further notice. Hapoel Tel Aviv's home match was moved to Tilburg, Netherlands, Beitar Jerusalem's to Sofia, Bulgaria, and Bnei Yehuda Tel Aviv's to Senec, Slovakia.)
Attendance: 180
Referee: Alexander Gonchar (Russia)
24 August 2006
18:30

Domžale (Slovenia)	0–3	(Israel) Hapoel Tel Aviv
	Report	Jolić 70'; Vermouth 90+1'; Ogbonna 90+3'

Sports Park, Domžale
Attendance: 2,300
Referee: Willie Collum (Scotland)

Hapoel Tel Aviv won 4–2 on aggregate.

10 August 2006

CSKA Sofia (Bulgaria)	0–0	(Serbia) Hajduk Kula
	Report

Balgarska Armiya Stadium, Sofia
Attendance: 3,128
Referee: Ian Stokes (Republic of Ireland)
24 August 2006
20:30

Hajduk Kula (Serbia)	1–1 (a.e.t.)	(Bulgaria) CSKA Sofia
Stančić 100'	Report	Tunchev 119'

Stadion FK Crvena Zvezda, Belgrade
Attendance: 584
Referee: Ihor Ishchenko (Ukraine)

1–1 on aggregate; CSKA Sofia won on away goals.

10 August 2006

Roeselare (Belgium)	2–1	(Cyprus) Ethnikos Achna
Dufoor 36'; Oris 80'	Report	Stjepanović 78' (pen.)

Schiervelde Stadion, Roeselare
Attendance: 2,986
Referee: Karen Nalbandyan (Armenia)
24 August 2006
18:00

Ethnikos Achna (Cyprus)	5–0	(Belgium) Roeselare
Poyiatzis 3', 17'; Stjepanović 47' (pen.), 65'; Belić 88'	Report

GSP Stadium, Nicosia
Attendance: 1,300
Referee: Dragomir Tanović (Serbia)

Ethnikos Achna won 6–2 on aggregate.

8 August 2006

OFK Beograd (Serbia)	1–0	(France) Auxerre
Bajalica 31'	Report

Omladinski Stadium, Belgrade
Attendance: 2,000
Referee: Tsvetan Georgiev (Bulgaria)
24 August 2006
20:00

Auxerre (France)	5–1	(Serbia) OFK Beograd
Mignot 23'; Jeleń 44'; Pieroni 82', 86', 89'	Report	Pilipović 31'

Stade de l'Abbé-Deschamps, Auxerre
Attendance: 3,951
Referee: Alfonso Pérez Burrull (Spain)

Auxerre won 5–2 on aggregate.

10 August 2006

Dinamo București (Romania)	1–0	(Israel) Beitar Jerusalem
Munteanu 77'	Report

Stadionul Dinamo, Bucharest
Attendance: 5,300
Referee: Vitaliy Godulyan (Ukraine)
24 August 2006
20:00

Beitar Jerusalem (Israel)	1–1	(Romania) Dinamo București
Yitzhaki 5'	Report	Gershon 23' (o.g.)

Georgi Asparuhov Stadium, Sofia, Bulgaria
Attendance: 500
Referee: Johnny Ver Eecke (Belgium)

Dinamo București won 2–1 on aggregate.

10 August 2006

Partizan (Serbia)	2–1	(Slovenia) Maribor
Odita 28', 30'	Report	Mihelič 64'

Stadion FK Partizan, Belgrade
Attendance: 8,000
Referee: Krzysztof Slupik (Poland)
24 August 2006
21:00

Maribor (Slovenia)	1–1	(Serbia) Partizan
Zajc 63'	Report	Zajić 30'

Ljudski vrt, Maribor
Attendance: 8,600
Referee: Philippe Kalt (France)

Partizan won 3–2 on aggregate.

10 August 2006

Sarajevo (Bosnia and Herzegovina)	1–0	(Romania) Rapid București
Obuća 90+2'	Report

Koševo Stadium, Sarajevo
Attendance: 8,000
Referee: Duarte Gomes (Portugal)
24 August 2006
18:30

Rapid București (Romania)	2–0	(Bosnia and Herzegovina) Sarajevo
Buga 39'; Moldovan 90+1'	Report

Stadionul Giulești-Valentin Stănescu, Bucharest
Attendance: 6,700
Referee: Joeri Van De Velde (Belgium)

Rapid București won 2–1 on aggregate.

10 August 2006

Bnei Yehuda (Israel)	0–2	(Bulgaria) Lokomotiv Sofia
	Report	Dafchev 30'; Genkov 57' (pen.)

NTC Stadion, Senec, Slovakia
Attendance: 500
Referee: Joseph Attard (Malta)
24 August 2006
19:30

Lokomotiv Sofia (Bulgaria)	4–0	(Israel) Bnei Yehuda
Dobrev 21'; Genkov 43'; Karadzhinov 61', 81'	Report

Balgarska Armiya Stadium, Sofia
Attendance: 881
Referee: Daniel Stålhammar (Sweden)

Lokomotiv Sofia won 6–0 on aggregate.

8 August 2006

Omonia (Cyprus)	0–0	(Bulgaria) Litex Lovech
	Report

GSP Stadium, Nicosia
Attendance: 13,447
Referee: João Ferreira (Portugal)
24 August 2006
19:45

Litex Lovech (Bulgaria)	2–1	(Cyprus) Omonia
Zlatinov 42'; Manolev 45'	Report	Berberović 32' (o.g.)

Lovech Stadium, Lovech
Attendance: 3,600
Referee: Romāns Lajuks (Latvia)

Litex Lovech won 2–1 on aggregate.

10 August 2006

Tirana (Albania)	0–2	(Turkey) Kayserispor
	Report	Akagündüz 26', 45'

Selman Stërmasi Stadium, Tirana
Attendance: 3,500
Referee: Ferenc Bede (Hungary)
24 August 2006
18:00

Kayserispor (Turkey)	3–1	(Albania) Tirana
Topuz 5'; Akagündüz 46'; Ünal 48'	Report	Salihi 52'

Kayseri Atatürk Stadium, Kayseri
Attendance: 11,887
Referee: Sten Kaldma (Estonia)

Kayserispor won 5–1 on aggregate.

=== Central–East region ===
10 August 2006

Artmedia Bratislava (Slovakia)	2–1	(Belarus) Dinamo Minsk
Reiter 73'; Čišovský 76'	Report	Edu 22'

Štadión Petržalka, Bratislava
Attendance: 4,500
Referee: Dougie McDonald (Scotland)
24 August 2006
18:00

Dinamo Minsk (Belarus)	2–3	(Slovakia) Artmedia Bratislava
Kovel 76'; Marcio 90+2'	Report	Halenár 31'; Gajdoš 38'; Burák 61'

Dinamo Stadium, Minsk
Attendance: 1,850
Referee: Levan Paniashvili (Georgia)

Artmedia Bratislava won 5–3 on aggregate.

10 August 2006

Ried (Austria)	0–0	(Switzerland) Sion
	Report

Fill Metallbau Stadion, Ried im Innkreis
Attendance: 3,033
Referee: Anthony Zammit (Malta)
24 August 2006
20:00

Sion (Switzerland)	1–0	(Austria) Ried
Kuljić 34' (pen.)	Report

Stade de Genève, Geneva
Attendance: 7,500
Referee: Michael Svendsen (Sweden)

Sion won 1–0 on aggregate.

10 August 2006

Fehérvár (Hungary)	1–1	(Switzerland) Grasshopper
Horváth 90+3'	Report	Pinto 70'

Stadion Sóstói, Székesfehérvár
Attendance: 3,970
Referee: Mike Dean (England)
24 August 2006
19:30

Grasshopper (Switzerland)	2–0	(Hungary) Fehérvár
Sutter 5'; António 24'	Report

Hardturm, Zürich
Attendance: 2,600
Referee: Björn Kuipers (Netherlands)

Grasshopper won 3–1 on aggregate.

10 August 2006

Karvan (Azerbaijan)	0–2	(Czech Republic) Slavia Prague
	Report	Hrdlička 14'; Fořt 90'

Shafa Stadium, Baku
Attendance: 6,700
Referee: Dejan Stanišić (Serbia)
24 August 2006
20:45

Slavia Prague (Czech Republic)	0–0	(Azerbaijan) Karvan
	Report

Stadion Evžena Rošického, Prague
Attendance: 2,512
Referee: Anders Hermansen (Denmark)

Slavia Prague won 2–0 on aggregate.

10 August 2006
17:00

Chornomorets Odesa (Ukraine)	0–0	(Poland) Wisła Płock
	Report

ChMP Central Stadium, Odesa
Attendance: 14,500
Referee: Csaba Sápi (Hungary)
24 August 2006
17:30

Wisła Płock (Poland)	1–1	(Ukraine) Chornomorets Odesa
Gevorgyan 63'	Report	Shyshchenko 30'

Kazimierz Górski Stadium, Płock
Attendance: 4,400
Referee: Fırat Aydınus (Turkey)

1–1 on aggregate; Chornomorets Odesa won on away goals.

10 August 2006
20:00

Basel (Switzerland)	1–0	(Liechtenstein) Vaduz
Majstorović 58'	Report

St. Jakob-Park, Basel
Attendance: 14,296
Referee: Radek Matějek (Czech Republic)
24 August 2006
19:30

Vaduz (Liechtenstein)	2–1	(Switzerland) Basel
Sara 49'; Ritzberger 63'	Report	Kuzmanović 56'

Rheinpark Stadion, Vaduz
Attendance: 3,660
Referee: Mark Clattenburg (England)

2–2 on aggregate; Basel won on away goals.

10 August 2006
19:00

Zimbru Chișinău (Moldova)	0–0	(Ukraine) Metalurh Zaporizhzhia
	Report

Zimbru Stadium, Chișinău
Attendance: 7,800
Referee: Meir Levi (Israel)
24 August 2006
19:00

Metalurh Zaporizhzhia (Ukraine)	3–0	(Moldova) Zimbru Chișinău
Tasevski 16', 54'; Kvirkvelia 70'	Report

Slavutych-Arena, Zaporizhia
Attendance: 5,500
Referee: Petteri Kari (Finland)

Metalurh Zaporizhzhia won 3–0 on aggregate.

10 August 2006

Mattersburg (Austria)	1–1	(Poland) Wisła Kraków
Naumoski 20'	Report	Zieńczuk 14'

Ernst-Happel-Stadion, Vienna
Attendance: 7,200
Referee: Per Ivar Staberg (Norway)
24 August 2006
20:30

Wisła Kraków (Poland)	1–0	(Austria) Mattersburg
Pi. Brożek 23'	Report

Stadion Miejski in Kraków, Kraków
Attendance: 12,817
Referee: Paulius Malžinskas (Lithuania)

Wisła Kraków won 2–1 on aggregate.

10 August 2006

Hertha BSC (Germany)	1–0	(Georgia (country)) Ameri Tbilisi
Okoronkwo 90+2'	Report

Friedrich-Ludwig-Jahn-Sportpark, Berlin
Attendance: 7,377
Referee: Christoforos Zografos (Greece)
24 August 2006
18:00

Ameri Tbilisi (Georgia (country))	2–2	(Germany) Hertha BSC
Davitnidze 17'; Davitashvili 47'	Report	Lakić 35'; Pantelić 85'

Mikheil Meskhi Stadium, Tbilisi
Attendance: 5,800
Referee: Pavel Olsiak (Slovakia)

Hertha BSC won 3–2 on aggregate.

10 August 2006

Rubin Kazan (Russia)	3–0	(Belarus) BATE Borisov
Bazayev 37'; Ashvetia 57', 68'	Report

Central Stadium, Kazan
Attendance: 7,200
Referee: Andrejs Sipailo (Latvia)
24 August 2006
18:30

BATE Borisov (Belarus)	0–2	(Russia) Rubin Kazan
	Report	Domínguez 37', 44'

Haradski Stadium, Barysaw
Attendance: 2,700
Referee: Siniša Zrnić (Bosnia and Herzegovina)

Rubin Kazan won 5–0 on aggregate.

10 August 2006

Young Boys (Switzerland)	3–3	(France) Marseille
Yakin 20'; João Paulo 49'; Marcos 73'	Report	Zubar 18'; Niang 44', 57'

Wankdorf Stadium, Bern
Attendance: 18,274
Referee: Bernhard Brugger (Austria)
24 August 2006
20:45

Marseille (France)	0–0	(Switzerland) Young Boys
	Report

Stade Vélodrome, Marseille
Attendance: 35,764
Referee: Emil Božinovski (Macedonia)

3–3 on aggregate; Marseille won on away goals.

=== Northern region ===
10 August 2006

Start (Norway)	1–0	(Republic of Ireland) Drogheda United
Strømstad 66'	Report

Kristiansand Stadion, Kristiansand
Attendance: 1,433
Referee: Sokol Jareci (Albania)
24 August 2006
20:45

Drogheda United (Republic of Ireland)	1–0 (a.e.t.)	(Norway) Start
Zayed 84'	Report
Penalties
Gartland (penalty missed); Webb (penalty scored); Robinson (penalty scored); Lynch (penalty scored); Keegan (penalty scored); Bradley (penalty scored); Gray (penalty scored); Zayed (penalty scored); Gavin (penalty scored); Connor (penalty scored); Whelan (penalty scored); Gartland (penalty missed)	10–11	(penalty scored) Bärlin; (penalty scored) Hæstad; (penalty scored) Johnsen; (penalty missed) Valencia; (penalty scored) Håland; (penalty scored) Aarsheim; (penalty scored) K. Paulsen; (penalty scored) Strømstad; (penalty scored) Nilssen; (penalty scored) Borgersen; (penalty scored) Garba; (penalty scored) Bärlin

Dalymount Park, Dublin
Attendance: 4,142
Referee: Mechalis Germanakos (Greece)

1–1 on aggregate; Start won 11–10 on penalties.

10 August 2006

Odense (Denmark)	1–0	(Wales) Llanelli
Bechara 29'	Report

Fionia Park, Odense
Attendance: 2,744
Referee: Egill Mar Markusson (Norway)
24 August 2006
20:45

Llanelli (Wales)	1–5	(Denmark) Odense
Corbisiero 10'	Report	Timm 17'; Hansen 33'; Sørensen 58'; Ophaug 65'; Bechara 90+1'

Liberty Stadium, Swansea
Attendance: 2,759
Referee: Dejan Delević (Serbia)

Odense won 6–1 on aggregate.

10 August 2006

Randers (Denmark)	3–1	(Lithuania) Kaunas
Fall 59'; Ahmed 82'; K. Pedersen 90+2' (pen.)	Report	Juška 80'

Randers Stadium, Randers
Attendance: 4,200
Referee: Mark Whitby (Wales)
24 August 2006
18:00

Kaunas (Lithuania)	1–0	(Denmark) Randers
Velička 72' (pen.)	Report

S. Darius and S. Girėnas Stadium, Kaunas
Attendance: 3,000
Referee: Alexandr Gvardis (Russia)

Randers won 3–2 on aggregate.

10 August 2006

Twente (Netherlands)	1–1	(Estonia) Levadia Tallinn
Heubach 53'	Report	Andreev 24'

Arke Stadion, Enschede
Attendance: 8,421
Referee: Thorsten Kinhöfer (Germany)
24 August 2006
20:00

Levadia Tallinn (Estonia)	1–0	(Netherlands) Twente
Nahk 36'	Report

A. Le Coq Arena, Tallinn
Attendance: 3,000
Referee: Marian Mircea Salomir (Romania)

Levadia Tallinn won 2–1 on aggregate.

10 August 2006

Ventspils (Latvia)	0–1	(England) Newcastle United
	Report	Bramble 67'

Skonto Stadium, Riga
Attendance: 6,000
Referee: Stéphane Lannoy (France)
24 August 2006
20:45

Newcastle United (England)	0–0	(Latvia) Ventspils
	Report

St James' Park, Newcastle upon Tyne
Attendance: 30,498
Referee: Thomas Einwaller (Austria)

Newcastle United won 1–0 on aggregate.

10 August 2006

Brann (Norway)	3–3	(Sweden) Åtvidabergs FF
Memelli 4', 26', 59'	Report	Haglund 27'; Bergström 28'; Karlsson 83'

Brann Stadion, Bergen
Attendance: 2,684
Referee: Richard Havrilla (Slovakia)
24 August 2006
19:30

Åtvidabergs FF (Sweden)	1–1	(Norway) Brann
Haglund 35'	Report	Dahl 85'

Värendsvallen, Växjö
Attendance: 786
Referee: Marek Mikołajewski (Poland)

4–4 on aggregate; Åtvidabergs FF won on away goals.

10 August 2006
19:00

Molde (Norway)	0–0	(Latvia) Skonto
	Report

Aker Stadion, Molde
Attendance: 1,495
Referee: Michael Ross (Northern Ireland)
24 August 2006
18:00

Skonto (Latvia)	1–2	(Norway) Molde
Astafjevs 68'	Report	Mavrič 42'; Ohr 61'

Skonto Stadium, Riga
Attendance: 3,500
Referee: Veaceslav Banari (Moldova)

Molde won 2–1 on aggregate.

10 August 2006

Flora (Estonia)	0–0	(Denmark) Brøndby
	Report

A. Le Coq Arena, Tallinn
Attendance: 2,500
Referee: Jouni Hietala (Finland)
24 August 2006
20:45

Brøndby (Denmark)	4–0	(Estonia) Flora
Jensen 49'; Agger 64', 87'; Lorentzen 78'	Report

Brøndby Stadium, Brøndbyvester
Attendance: 8,899
Referee: Claudio Circhetta (Switzerland)

Brøndby won 4–0 on aggregate.

10 August 2006

Sūduva (Lithuania)	0–2	(Belgium) Club Brugge
	Report	Daerden 19'; Roelandts 70'

S. Darius and S. Girėnas Stadium, Kaunas
Attendance: 2,100
Referee: Drago Kos (Slovenia)
24 August 2006
20:30

Club Brugge (Belgium)	5–2	(Lithuania) Sūduva
Roelandts 9'; Balaban 39', 69'; Gvozdenović 58'; Dufer 67'	Report	Otavio 51'; D. Chigladze 57' (pen.)

Jan Breydel Stadium, Bruges
Attendance: 6,800
Referee: Carlo Bertolini (Switzerland)

Club Brugge won 7–2 on aggregate.

10 August 2006

Gretna (Scotland)	1–5	(Republic of Ireland) Derry City
McGuffie 12'	Report	Kelly 23'; Deery 54', 56'; Martyn 63', 75'

Fir Park, Motherwell
Attendance: 6,040
Referee: Marijo Strahonja (Croatia)
24 August 2006
20:30

Derry City (Republic of Ireland)	2–2	(Scotland) Gretna
Farren 37'; Oman 69'	Report	Graham 17'; Baldacchino 77'

Brandywell Stadium, Derry
Referee: Peter Rasmussen (Denmark)

Derry City won 7–3 on aggregate.
