= 2006–07 UEFA Cup first round =

The first round matches of the 2006–07 UEFA Cup were played on 14 and 28 September 2006, which narrowed clubs down to 40 teams in preparation for the group stage.

Times are CEST (UTC+2), as listed by UEFA.

== Teams ==
The following 80 teams participated in the first round.

Key to colours
Winners of first round advanced to group stage

First round participants

Team	Notes	Coeff.
(Spain) Sevilla		61.006
(England) Newcastle United		75.950
(Greece) Panathinaikos		66.587
(Germany) Schalke 04		64.960
(Italy) Parma		63.020
(Netherlands) Ajax		60.640
(Germany) Bayer Leverkusen		57.960
(Netherlands) Feyenoord		54.640
(France) Auxerre		53.757
(Belgium) Club Brugge		49.981
(Switzerland) Basel		49.537
(France) Marseille		48.757
(Netherlands) AZ		48.640
(Germany) Hertha BSC		46.960
(Czech Republic) Sparta Prague		44.769
(Scotland) Rangers		43.023
(Spain) Celta Vigo		43.006
(France) Paris Saint-Germain		41.757
(Russia) Lokomotiv Moscow		41.504
(France) Lens		39.757

Team	Notes	Coeff.
(Turkey) Beşiktaş		38.634
(Italy) Palermo		36.020
(Czech Republic) Slavia Prague		33.769
(Spain) Espanyol		33.006
(Netherlands) Heerenveen		30.640
(Serbia) Partizan		30.600
(Romania) Rapid București		30.381
(Poland) Wisła Kraków		29.104
(Czech Republic) Slovan Liberec		28.769
(Turkey) Fenerbahçe		28.634
Austria Wien		27.723
(Israel) Hapoel Tel Aviv		26.108
(Spain) Osasuna		25.006
(Bulgaria) Litex Lovech		24.016
(England) Blackburn Rovers		23.950
(Denmark) Brøndby		23.593
(Switzerland) Grasshopper		23.537
(Italy) Chievo		23.020
(Romania) Dinamo București		22.381
(Italy) Livorno		22.020

Team	Notes	Coeff.
(Bulgaria) CSKA Sofia		21.016
(England) Tottenham Hotspur		20.950
(England) West Ham United		20.950
(Croatia) Dinamo Zagreb		20.647
(Serbia) Red Star Belgrade		20.600
(Scotland) Heart of Midlothian		20.023
(Israel) Maccabi Haifa		19.108
(Belgium) Standard Liège		17.981
(Portugal) Braga		17.533
(France) Nancy		16.757
(Poland) Legia Warsaw		16.104
(Germany) Eintracht Frankfurt		15.960
(Portugal) Vitória de Setúbal		15.533
(Portugal) Nacional		14.533
(Netherlands) Groningen		13.640
(Slovakia) Artmedia Bratislava		13.070
(Greece) Iraklis		12.587
(Greece) Skoda Xanthi		12.587
(Turkey) Trabzonspor		11.634
(Greece) Atromitos		10.587

Team	Notes	Coeff.
(Russia) Rubin Kazan		10.504
(Belgium) Zulte Waregem		9.981
(Ukraine) Metalurh Zaporizhzhia		9.777
(Norway) Molde		8.921
(Ukraine) Chornomorets Odesa		8.777
(Czech Republic) Mladá Boleslav		8.769
(Austria) Red Bull Salzburg		8.723
(Turkey) Kayserispor		8.634
(Denmark) Odense		8.593
(Switzerland) Sion		8.537
(Bulgaria) Lokomotiv Sofia		8.016
(Norway) Start		6.921
(Austria) Superfund		6.723
(Slovakia) Ružomberok		6.070
(Denmark) Randers		5.593
(Sweden) Åtvidabergs FF		4.372
(Cyprus) Ethnikos Achna		3.355
(North Macedonia) Rabotnicki		1.760
(Republic of Ireland) Derry City		1.430
(Estonia) Levadia Tallinn		0.880

Notes

1. ^{TH} UEFA Cup title holders
2. ^{QR} Winners from the second qualifying round
3. ^{CL} Losers from the Champions League third qualifying round

== Seeding ==
UEFA allocated the teams into eight groups, each with five seeded and five unseeded teams.

Group 1		Group 2		Group 3		Group 4	
Seeded	Unseeded	Seeded	Unseeded	Seeded	Unseeded	Seeded	Unseeded
(England) Newcastle United; (Scotland) Rangers; (Spain) Celta Vigo; (Israel) Hapoel Tel Aviv; (Italy) Chievo	(Belgium) Standard Liège; (Portugal) Braga; (Norway) Molde; (Ukraine) Chornomorets Odesa; (Estonia) Levadia Tallinn	(Greece) Panathinaikos; (Germany) Hertha BSC; (France) Paris Saint-Germain; Austria Wien; (Bulgaria) Litex Lovech	(Israel) Maccabi Haifa; (Poland) Legia Warsaw; (Ukraine) Metalurh Zaporizhzhia; (Denmark) Odense; (Republic of Ireland) Derry City	(Germany) Schalke 04; (Czech Republic) Sparta Prague; (Russia) Lokomotiv Moscow; (Turkey) Fenerbahçe; (England) Blackburn Rovers	(Scotland) Heart of Midlothian; (France) Nancy; (Belgium) Zulte Waregem; (Austria) Red Bull Salzburg; (Denmark) Randers	(Italy) Parma; (Netherlands) AZ; (France) Lens; (Czech Republic) Slovan Liberec; (Denmark) Brøndby	(Serbia) Red Star Belgrade; (Germany) Eintracht Frankfurt; (Russia) Rubin Kazan; (Turkey) Kayserispor; (Cyprus) Ethnikos Achna
Group 5		Group 6		Group 7		Group 8	
Seeded	Unseeded	Seeded	Unseeded	Seeded	Unseeded	Seeded	Unseeded
(Spain) Sevilla; (France) Marseille; (Turkey) Beşiktaş; (Netherlands) Heerenveen; (Switzerland) Grasshopper	(Bulgaria) CSKA Sofia; (Portugal) Vitória de Setúbal; (Greece) Atromitos; (Czech Republic) Mladá Boleslav; (Sweden) Åtvidabergs FF	(Netherlands) Feyenoord; (Switzerland) Basel; (Italy) Palermo; (Romania) Rapid București; (Spain) Osasuna	(England) West Ham United; (Portugal) Nacional; (Turkey) Trabzonspor; (Bulgaria) Lokomotiv Sofia; (North Macedonia) Rabotnicki	(Germany) Bayer Leverkusen; (Belgium) Club Brugge; (Czech Republic) Slavia Prague; (Serbia) Partizan; (Romania) Dinamo București	(England) Tottenham Hotspur; (Netherlands) Groningen; (Greece) Skoda Xanthi; (Switzerland) Sion; (Slovakia) Ružomberok	(Netherlands) Ajax; (France) Auxerre; (Spain) Espanyol; (Poland) Wisła Kraków; (Italy) Livorno	(Croatia) Dinamo Zagreb; (Slovakia) Artmedia Bratislava; (Greece) Iraklis; (Norway) Start; (Austria) Superfund

== Summary ==
The matches were held on 14 September (first leg) and 28 September 2006 (second leg).

Team 1	Agg.	Team 2	1st leg	2nd leg
Chornomorets Odesa (Ukraine)	1–4	(Israel) Hapoel Tel Aviv	0–1	1–3
Braga (Portugal)	3–2	(Italy) Chievo	2–0	1–2 (a.e.t.)
Levadia Tallinn (Estonia)	1–3	(England) Newcastle United	0–1	1–2
Molde (Norway)	0–2	(Scotland) Rangers	0–0	0–2
Standard Liège (Belgium)	0–4	(Spain) Celta Vigo	0–1	0–3
Maccabi Haifa (Israel)	4–2	(Bulgaria) Litex Lovech	1–1	3–1
Derry City (Republic of Ireland)	0–2	(France) Paris Saint-Germain	0–0	0–2
Hertha BSC (Germany)	2–3	(Denmark) Odense	2–2	0–1
Legia Warsaw (Poland)	1–2	Austria Wien	1–1	0–1
Panathinaikos (Greece)	2–1	(Ukraine) Metalurh Zaporizhzhia	1–1	1–0
Lokomotiv Moscow (Russia)	2–3	(Belgium) Zulte Waregem	2–1	0–2
Heart of Midlothian (Scotland)	0–2	(Czech Republic) Sparta Prague	0–2	0–0
Fenerbahçe (Turkey)	5–1	(Denmark) Randers	2–1	3–0
Red Bull Salzburg (Austria)	2–4	(England) Blackburn Rovers	2–2	0–2
Schalke 04 (Germany)	2–3	(France) Nancy	1–0	1–3
Ethnikos Achna (Cyprus)	1–3	(France) Lens	0–0	1–3
Slovan Liberec (Czech Republic)	4–1	(Serbia) Red Star Belgrade	2–0	2–1
AZ (Netherlands)	4–3	(Turkey) Kayserispor	3–2	1–1
Rubin Kazan (Russia)	0–2	(Italy) Parma	0–1	0–1
Atromitos (Greece)	1–6	(Spain) Sevilla	1–2	0–4
Eintracht Frankfurt (Germany)	6–2	(Denmark) Brøndby	4–0	2–2
Beşiktaş (Turkey)	4–2	(Bulgaria) CSKA Sofia	2–0	2–2 (a.e.t.)
Vitória de Setúbal (Portugal)	0–3	(Netherlands) Heerenveen	0–3	0–0
Marseille (France)	3–4	(Czech Republic) Mladá Boleslav	1–0	2–4
Åtvidabergs FF (Sweden)	0–8	(Switzerland) Grasshopper	0–3	0–5
Rapid București (Romania)	3–1	(Portugal) Nacional	1–0	2–1 (a.e.t.)
Trabzonspor (Turkey)	2–2 (a)	(Spain) Osasuna	2–2	0–0
Basel (Switzerland)	7–2	(North Macedonia) Rabotnicki	6–2	1–0
West Ham United (England)	0–4	(Italy) Palermo	0–1	0–3
Lokomotiv Sofia (Bulgaria)	2–2 (a)	(Netherlands) Feyenoord	2–2	0–0
Ružomberok (Slovakia)	1–2	(Belgium) Club Brugge	0–1	1–1
Sion (Switzerland)	1–3	(Germany) Bayer Leverkusen	0–0	1–3
Partizan (Serbia)	4–3	(Netherlands) Groningen	4–2	0–1
Skoda Xanthi (Greece)	4–8	(Romania) Dinamo București	3–4	1–4
Slavia Prague (Czech Republic)	0–2	(England) Tottenham Hotspur	0–1	0–1
Start (Norway)	2–9	(Netherlands) Ajax	2–5	0–4
Artmedia Bratislava (Slovakia)	3–5	(Spain) Espanyol	2–2	1–3
Wisła Kraków (Poland)	2–1	(Greece) Iraklis	0–1	2–0 (a.e.t.)
Livorno (Italy)	3–0	(Austria) Superfund	2–0	1–0
Dinamo Zagreb (Croatia)	2–5	(France) Auxerre	1–2	1–3

== Matches ==
14 September 2006
18:00

Chornomorets Odesa (Ukraine)	0–1	(Israel) Hapoel Tel Aviv
	Report	De Bruno 74'

ChMP Central Stadium, Odesa
Attendance: 18,500
Referee: Sorin Carpodean (Romania)
28 September 2006
18:30

Hapoel Tel Aviv (Israel)	3–1	(Ukraine) Chornomorets Odesa
Toama 24'; Barda 74'; De Bruno 88'	Report	Nizhegorodov 82'

Bloomfield Stadium, Tel Aviv
Attendance: 12,000
Referee: Fritz Stuchlik (Austria)

Hapoel Tel Aviv won 3–1 on aggregate.

14 September 2006
20:00

Braga (Portugal)	2–0	(Italy) Chievo
Paulo Jorge 5'; Wender 90+1'	Report

Estádio Municipal, Braga
Attendance: 9,753
Referee: Johan Verbist (Belgium)
28 September 2006
20:45

Chievo (Italy)	2–1 (a.e.t.)	(Portugal) Braga
Tiribocchi 38'; Godeas 67'	Report	Wender 104'

Stadio Marc'Antonio Bentegodi, Verona
Attendance: 4,722
Referee: Carlos Megía Dávila (Spain)

Braga won 3–2 on aggregate.

14 September 2006
16:55

Levadia Tallinn (Estonia)	0–1	(England) Newcastle United
	Report	Sibierski 10'

Lilleküla Stadium, Tallinn
Attendance: 7,970
Referee: Martin Ingvarsson (Sweden)
28 September 2006
20:30

Newcastle United (England)	2–1	(Estonia) Levadia Tallinn
Martins 47', 50'	Report	Zelinski 65'

St James' Park, Newcastle upon Tyne
Attendance: 27,012
Referee: Kristinn Jakobsson (Iceland)

Newcastle United won 3–1 on aggregate.

14 September 2006
20:05

Molde (Norway)	0–0	(Scotland) Rangers
	Report

Aker Stadion, Molde
Attendance: 6,452
Referee: Jacek Granat (Poland)
28 September 2006
20:45

Rangers (Scotland)	2–0	(Norway) Molde
Buffel 12'; Ferguson 45'	Report

Ibrox Stadium, Glasgow
Attendance: 44,624
Referee: Knut Kircher (Germany)

Rangers won 2–0 on aggregate.

14 September 2006
20:30

Standard Liège (Belgium)	0–1	(Spain) Celta Vigo
	Report	López 38'

Stade Maurice Dufrasne, Liège
Attendance: 10,646
Referee: Gerald Lehner (Austria)
28 September 2006
21:00

Celta Vigo (Spain)	3–0	(Belgium) Standard Liège
Baiano 22', 83'; Canobbio 70'	Report

Balaídos, Vigo
Attendance: 7,751
Referee: Matteo Trefoloni (Italy)

Celta Vigo won 4–0 on aggregate.

14 September 2006
20:30

Maccabi Haifa (Israel)	1–1	(Bulgaria) Litex Lovech
Katan 7'	Report	Zanev 51'

Stadion de Goffert, Nijmegen, Netherlands (Note: Due to the armed conflict in Israel, UEFA had ruled that European tournament matches could not be played in Israel until further notice. Maccabi Haifa's home leg on 14 September was moved to Nijmegen, Netherlands. On 15 September, UEFA lifted the ban, allowing future matches to be played in the Tel Aviv area. Hapoel Tel Aviv were able to play their home leg in Tel Aviv on 28 September.)
Attendance: 390
Referee: Mark Halsey (England)
28 September 2006
20:00

Litex Lovech (Bulgaria)	1–3	(Israel) Maccabi Haifa
Sandrinho 37'	Report	Xavir 19'; Masudi 33'; Colautti 67'

Lovech Stadium, Lovech
Attendance: 3,000
Referee: Alan Kelly (Republic of Ireland)

Maccabi Haifa won 4–2 on aggregate.

14 September 2006
20:00

Derry City (Republic of Ireland)	0–0	(France) Paris Saint-Germain
	Report

Brandywell Stadium, Derry
Attendance: 3,400
Referee: Richard Havrilla (Slovakia)
28 September 2006
21:00

Paris Saint-Germain (France)	2–0	(Republic of Ireland) Derry City
Cissé 7'; Pauleta 42'	Report

Parc des Princes, Paris
Attendance: 22,213
Referee: Oleh Oriekhov (Ukraine)

Paris Saint-Germain won 2–0 on aggregate.

14 September 2006
17:00

Hertha BSC (Germany)	2–2	(Denmark) Odense
Giménez 38'; Boateng 51'	Report	Šimunić 6' (o.g.); Bechara 53'

Olympic Stadium, Berlin
Attendance: 12,814
Referee: Viktor Kassai (Hungary)
28 September 2006
15:30

Odense (Denmark)	1–0	(Germany) Hertha BSC
Timm 62'	Report

Odense Stadion, Odense
Attendance: 11,466
Referee: Iain Brines (Scotland)

Odense won 3–2 on aggregate.

14 September 2006
17:30

Legia Warsaw (Poland)	1–1	Austria Wien
Junior Godoi 45'	Report	Mair 26'

Polish Army Stadium, Warsaw
Attendance: 8,854
Referee: Damir Skomina (Slovenia)
28 September 2006
20:45

Austria Wien	1–0	(Poland) Legia Warsaw
Wallner 65'	Report

Ernst-Happel-Stadion, Vienna
Attendance: 12,300
Referee: Stanislav Sukhina (Russia)

Austria Wien won 2–1 on aggregate.

14 September 2006
20:45

Panathinaikos (Greece)	1–1	(Ukraine) Metalurh Zaporizhzhia
Salpingidis 10'	Report	Hodin 47'

Pampeloponnisiako Stadium, Patras (Note: Panathinaikos played their home match at Pampeloponnisiako Stadium, Patras, instead of their regular stadium Olympic Stadium, Athens, due to 2006 IAAF World Cup being held there.)
Attendance: 15,626
Referee: Paulo Costa (Portugal)
28 September 2006
20:15

Metalurh Zaporizhzhia (Ukraine)	0–1	(Greece) Panathinaikos
	Report	Papadopoulos 14'

Slavutych-Arena, Zaporizhia
Attendance: 11,000
Referee: Krzysztof Slupik (Poland)

Panathinaikos won 2–1 on aggregate.

14 September 2006
18:15

Lokomotiv Moscow (Russia)	2–1	(Belgium) Zulte Waregem
Loskov 35'; Ivanović 73'	Report	Vandermarliere 90+3'

Lokomotiv Stadium, Moscow
Attendance: 11,023
Referee: Dougie McDonald (Scotland)
28 September 2006
19:00

Zulte Waregem (Belgium)	2–0	(Russia) Lokomotiv Moscow
Matthys 57'; Sergeant 82'	Report

Jules Ottenstadion, Ghent
Attendance: 4,800
Referee: Jouni Hyytiä (Finland)

Zulte Waregem won 3–2 on aggregate.

14 September 2006
20:45

Heart of Midlothian (Scotland)	0–2	(Czech Republic) Sparta Prague
	Report	Kolář 34'; Matušovič 71'

Murrayfield Stadium, Edinburgh
Attendance: 27,255
Referee: Paolo Bertini (Italy)
28 September 2006
21:00

Sparta Prague (Czech Republic)	0–0	(Scotland) Heart of Midlothian
	Report

Stadion Letná, Prague
Attendance: 16,505
Referee: Peter Sippel (Germany)

Sparta Prague won 2–0 on aggregate.

14 September 2006
20:45

Fenerbahçe (Turkey)	2–1	(Denmark) Randers
R. Pedersen 24' (o.g.); Kežman 54'	Report	Fall 13'

Şükrü Saracoğlu Stadium, Istanbul
Attendance: 32,893
Referee: Franz-Xaver Wack (Germany)
28 September 2006
20:30

Randers (Denmark)	0–3	(Turkey) Fenerbahçe
	Report	Deivid 61'; Tuncay 64'; Kežman 70'

Aarhus Stadion, Aarhus
Attendance: 14,282
Referee: Pedro Proença (Portugal)

Fenerbahçe won 5–1 on aggregate.

14 September 2006
20:45

Red Bull Salzburg (Austria)	2–2	(England) Blackburn Rovers
Zickler 30'; Janko 90+2'	Report	Savage 32'; McCarthy 39'

Red Bull Arena, Salzburg
Attendance: 16,140
Referee: Tomasz Mikulski (Poland)
28 September 2006
20:45

Blackburn Rovers (England)	2–0	(Austria) Red Bull Salzburg
McCarthy 32'; Bentley 56'	Report

Ewood Park, Blackburn
Attendance: 18,888
Referee: João Ferreira (Portugal)

Blackburn Rovers won 4–2 on aggregate.

14 September 2006
19:00

Schalke 04 (Germany)	1–0	(France) Nancy
Larsen 86'	Report

Arena AufSchalke, Gelsenkirchen
Attendance: 45,878
Referee: Nicolai Vollquartz (Denmark)
28 September 2006
18:00

Nancy (France)	3–1	(Germany) Schalke 04
André Luiz 18'; Curbelo 25'; Dia 70'	Report	Kurányi 22'

Stade Marcel Picot, Tomblaine
Attendance: 18,029
Referee: Eduardo Iturralde González (Spain)

Nancy won 3–2 on aggregate.

14 September 2006
18:00

Ethnikos Achna (Cyprus)	0–0	(France) Lens
	Report

GSP Stadium, Nicosia
Attendance: 1,169
Referee: Domenico Messina (Italy)
28 September 2006
18:00

Lens (France)	3–1	(Cyprus) Ethnikos Achna
Dindane 10'; Jemaa 63'; Cousin 64'	Report	Belić 69'

Stade Félix-Bollaert, Lens
Attendance: 27,171
Referee: Lucílio Batista (Portugal)

Lens won 3–1 on aggregate.

14 September 2006
17:30

Slovan Liberec (Czech Republic)	2–0	(Serbia) Red Star Belgrade
Frejlach 43'; Blažek 90'	Report

Stadion u Nisy, Liberec
Attendance: 7,215
Referee: Craig Thomson (Scotland)
28 September 2006
20:00

Red Star Belgrade (Serbia)	1–2	(Czech Republic) Slovan Liberec
Aílton 43'	Report	Bílek 2'; Holenda 67'

Red Star Stadium, Belgrade
Attendance: 19,000
Referee: Claudio Circhetta (Switzerland)

Slovan Liberec won 4–1 on aggregate.

14 September 2006
20:00

AZ (Netherlands)	3–2	(Turkey) Kayserispor
Kovermans 6' (pen.); Molhoek 32'; Arveladze 64'	Report	Bölükbaşı 25'; Başdağ 67'

DSB Stadion, Alkmaar
Attendance: 12,200
Referee: Julián Rodríguez Santiago (Spain)
28 September 2006
19:00

Kayserispor (Turkey)	1–1	(Netherlands) AZ
Ünal 11'	Report	Dembélé 54'

Kayseri Atatürk Stadium, Kayseri
Attendance: 16,332
Referee: Pavel Královec (Czech Republic)

AZ won 4–3 on aggregate.

14 September 2006
15:30

Rubin Kazan (Russia)	0–1	(Italy) Parma
	Report	Dessena 79'

Central Stadium, Kazan
Attendance: 23,000
Referee: Athanassios Briakos (Greece)
28 September 2006
18:30

Parma (Italy)	1–0	(Russia) Rubin Kazan
Paponi 49'	Report

Stadio Ennio Tardini, Parma
Attendance: 2,501
Referee: Michael Weiner (Germany)

Parma won 2–0 on aggregate.

14 September 2006
21:00

Atromitos (Greece)	1–2	(Spain) Sevilla
Korakakis 64'	Report	Kepa 16'; Duda 43'

Georgios Kamaras Stadium, Athens
Attendance: 3,500
Referee: Stefan Messner (Austria)
28 September 2006
21:30

Sevilla (Spain)	4–0	(Greece) Atromitos
Luís Fabiano 2', 29'; Ioannou 10' (o.g.); Kepa 86'	Report

Ramón Sánchez Pizjuán Stadium, Seville
Attendance: 30,644
Referee: Vladimír Hriňák (Slovakia)

Sevilla won 6–1 on aggregate.

14 September 2006
20:45

Eintracht Frankfurt (Germany)	4–0	(Denmark) Brøndby
Thurk 51' (pen.), 71' (pen.), 78'; Köhler 90'	Report

Waldstadion, Frankfurt
Attendance: 40,000
Referee: Rob Styles (England)
28 September 2006
18:05

Brøndby (Denmark)	2–2	(Germany) Eintracht Frankfurt
Ericsson 20'; T. Rasmussen 65'	Report	Vasoski 6', 52'

Brøndby Stadium, Brøndbyvester
Attendance: 14,067
Referee: Pieter Vink (Netherlands)

Eintracht Frankfurt won 6–2 on aggregate.

14 September 2006
18:45

Beşiktaş (Turkey)	2–0	(Bulgaria) CSKA Sofia
Kléberson 81'; Güleç 90+1'	Report

BJK İnönü Stadium, Istanbul
Attendance: 22,602
Referee: Bruno Paixão (Portugal)
28 September 2006
18:30

CSKA Sofia (Bulgaria)	2–2 (a.e.t.)	(Turkey) Beşiktaş
Iliev 60'; Tunchev 69'	Report	Nobre 95'; Bobô 103'

Balgarska Armia Stadium, Sofia
Attendance: 12,000
Referee: Dick van Egmond (Netherlands)

Beşiktaş won 4–3 on aggregate.

14 September 2006
22:00

Vitória de Setúbal (Portugal)	0–3	(Netherlands) Heerenveen
	Report	Alves 59', 66'; Nilsson 90+2'

Estádio do Bonfim, Setúbal
Attendance: 3,027
Referee: Helmut Fleischer (Germany)
28 September 2006
18:45

Heerenveen (Netherlands)	0–0	(Portugal) Vitória de Setúbal
	Report

Abe Lenstra Stadion, Heerenveen
Attendance: 16,800
Referee: Emil Božinovski (Macedonia)

Heerenveen won 3–0 on aggregate.

14 September 2006
20:45

Marseille (France)	1–0	(Czech Republic) Mladá Boleslav
Bamogo 31'	Report

Stade Vélodrome, Marseille
Attendance: 24,436
Referee: Espen Berntsen (Norway)
28 September 2006
17:30

Mladá Boleslav (Czech Republic)	4–2	(France) Marseille
Pecka 34'; Holub 62' (pen.), 82'; Sedláček 90+2'	Report	Maoulida 19'; Taiwo 56'

Městský stadion, Mladá Boleslav
Attendance: 5,000
Referee: Ruud Bossen (Netherlands)

Mladá Boleslav won 4–3 on aggregate.

14 September 2006
19:30

Åtvidabergs FF (Sweden)	0–3	(Switzerland) Grasshopper
	Report	León 12'; Eduardo 28'; Sutter 57'

Idrottsparken, Norrköping
Attendance: 5,130
Referee: Mark Courtney (Northern Ireland)
28 September 2006
19:30

Grasshopper (Switzerland)	5–0	(Sweden) Åtvidabergs FF
Blumer 29'; Sutter 31'; Schwegler 57'; Eduardo 60'; Renggli 67'	Report

Hardturm, Zürich
Attendance: 4,800
Referee: Levan Paniashvili (Georgia)

Grasshopper won 8–0 on aggregate.

14 September 2006
19:00

Rapid București (Romania)	1–0	(Portugal) Nacional
Moldovan 43'	Report

Stadionul Giulești-Valentin Stănescu, Bucharest
Attendance: 7,050
Referee: Radek Matějek (Czech Republic)
28 September 2006
21:00

Nacional (Portugal)	1–2 (a.e.t.)	(Romania) Rapid București
Spadacio 29'	Report	Rada 91'; Burdujan 101'

Estádio dos Barreiros, Funchal
Attendance: 6,833
Referee: Zsolt Szabó (Hungary)

Rapid București won 3–1 on aggregate.

14 September 2006
19:00

Trabzonspor (Turkey)	2–2	(Spain) Osasuna
Karadeniz 55'; Bulut 89'	Report	Valdo 21'; Juanlu 53'

Hüseyin Avni Aker Stadium, Trabzon
Attendance: 100 (Note: UEFA ordered Trabzonspor's home leg on 14 September to be played behind closed doors after objects were thrown at visiting fans and the fourth official, and a smoke bomb ignited in the stands, during their second qualifying round home leg against Cypriots APOEL. Trabzonspor appealed, and UEFA rejected the appeal on 13 September. Trabzonspor's penalty includes a second closed-doors game, a penalty which has been deferred for two years and will be removed if no further incidents occur.)
Referee: Jaroslav Jára (Czech Republic)
28 September 2006
20:45

Osasuna (Spain)	0–0	(Turkey) Trabzonspor
	Report

El Sadar Stadium, Pamplona
Attendance: 14,918
Referee: Serge Gumienny (Belgium)

2–2 on aggregate; Osasuna won on away goals.

14 September 2006
20:00

Basel (Switzerland)	6–2	(North Macedonia) Rabotnicki
Kuzmanović 2'; Petrić 6', 40'; Majstorović 34' (pen.); Cristiano 71', 73'	Report	Pejčić 89'; Buckley 90+4' (o.g.)

St. Jakob-Park, Basel
Attendance: 11,945
Referee: Alexandru Tudor (Romania)
28 September 2006
19:30

Rabotnicki (North Macedonia)	0–1	(Switzerland) Basel
	Report	Sterjovski 74'

Philip II Arena, Skopje
Attendance: 1,500
Referee: Ceri Richards (Wales)

Basel won 7–2 on aggregate.

14 September 2006
21:00

West Ham United (England)	0–1	(Italy) Palermo
	Report	Caracciolo 45'

Boleyn Ground, London
Attendance: 33,322
Referee: Stefan Johannesson (Sweden)
28 September 2006
20:45

Palermo (Italy)	3–0	(England) West Ham United
Simplício 35', 62'; Di Michele 67'	Report

Stadio Renzo Barbera, Palermo
Attendance: 19,284
Referee: Georgios Kasnaferis (Greece)

Palermo won 4–0 on aggregate.

14 September 2006
20:20

Lokomotiv Sofia (Bulgaria)	2–2	(Netherlands) Feyenoord
Genkov 5'; Dafchev 29'	Report	Lucius 45+4'; Greene 60'

Balgarska Armia Stadium, Sofia
Attendance: 3,000
Referee: Brage Sandmoen (Norway)
28 September 2006
19:45

Feyenoord (Netherlands)	0–0	(Bulgaria) Lokomotiv Sofia
	Report

De Kuip, Rotterdam
Attendance: 22,000
Referee: Ivan Bebek (Croatia)

2–2 on aggregate; Feyenoord won on away goals.

14 September 2006
20:45

Ružomberok (Slovakia)	0–1	(Belgium) Club Brugge
	Report	Balaban 38'

MFK Stadium, Ružomberok
Attendance: 4,200
Referee: Edo Trivković (Croatia)
28 September 2006
20:30

Club Brugge (Belgium)	1–1	(Slovakia) Ružomberok
Balaban 89'	Report	Rák 29'

Jan Breydel Stadium, Bruges
Attendance: 8,425
Referee: Selçuk Dereli (Turkey)

Club Brugge won 2–1 on aggregate.

14 September 2006
20:30

Sion (Switzerland)	0–0	(Germany) Bayer Leverkusen
	Report

Stade de Genève, Geneva
Attendance: 11,000
Referee: Robert Małek (Poland)
28 September 2006
20:30

Bayer Leverkusen (Germany)	3–1	(Switzerland) Sion
Voronin 62'; Ramelow 76'; Schneider 86' (pen.)	Report	Fernandes 75'

BayArena, Leverkusen
Attendance: 22,500
Referee: Jonas Eriksson (Sweden)

Bayer Leverkusen won 3–1 on aggregate.

14 September 2006
19:00

Partizan (Serbia)	4–2	(Netherlands) Groningen
Marinković 4' (pen.), 43'; Zajić 16', 90'	Report	Fledderus 58'; Suárez 90+2'

Partizan Stadium, Belgrade
Attendance: 10,000
Referee: Romāns Lajuks (Latvia)
28 September 2006
20:00

Groningen (Netherlands)	1–0	(Serbia) Partizan
Van de Laak 59' (pen.)	Report

Euroborg, Groningen
Attendance: 19,230
Referee: Cristian Balaj (Romania)

Partizan won 4–3 on aggregate.

14 September 2006
18:00

Skoda Xanthi (Greece)	3–4	(Romania) Dinamo București
Quintana 8', 45'; Kazakis 66'	Report	Niculescu 18', 35'; Dănciulescu 25'; Pulhac 85'

Skoda Xanthi Arena, Xanthi
Attendance: 3,380
Referee: Novo Panić (Bosnia and Herzegovina)
28 September 2006
19:00

Dinamo București (Romania)	4–1	(Greece) Skoda Xanthi
Niculescu 12', 82'; Cristea 47'; Dănciulescu 79'	Report	Paviot 51'

Stadionul Dinamo, Bucharest
Attendance: 5,442
Referee: Igor Egorov (Russia)

Dinamo București won 8–4 on aggregate.

14 September 2006
20:00

Slavia Prague (Czech Republic)	0–1	(England) Tottenham Hotspur
	Report	Jenas 37'

Stadion Evžena Rošického, Prague
Attendance: 14,869
Referee: Hervé Piccirillo (France)
28 September 2006
21:00

Tottenham Hotspur (England)	1–0	(Czech Republic) Slavia Prague
Keane 79'	Report

White Hart Lane, London
Attendance: 35,191
Referee: Tommy Skjerven (Norway)

Tottenham Hotspur won 2–0 on aggregate.

14 September 2006
18:15

Start (Norway)	2–5	(Netherlands) Ajax
Johnsen 27'; Fevang 55'	Report	Huntelaar 17', 87'; Rosenberg 42'; Sneijder 63'; Roger 67'

Åråsen Stadion, Lillestrøm
Attendance: 1,840
Referee: Grzegorz Gilewski (Poland)
28 September 2006
20:45

Ajax (Netherlands)	4–0	(Norway) Start
Rosenberg 6', 26'; Grygera 43'; Babel 68'	Report

Amsterdam Arena, Amsterdam
Attendance: 26,450
Referee: Darko Čeferin (Slovenia)

Ajax won 9–2 on aggregate.

14 September 2006
18:45

Artmedia Bratislava (Slovakia)	2–2	(Spain) Espanyol
Halenár 36'; Tchuř 41'	Report	Riera 31'; Pandiani 53'

Tehelné pole, Bratislava
Attendance: 3,480
Referee: Nikolai Ivanov (Russia)
28 September 2006
21:30

Espanyol (Spain)	3–1	(Slovakia) Artmedia Bratislava
Pandiani 19', 79'; García 67'	Report	Buryán 13'

Olympic Stadium, Barcelona
Attendance: 8,100
Referee: Costas Kapitanis (Cyprus)

Espanyol won 5–3 on aggregate.

14 September 2006
20:30

Wisła Kraków (Poland)	0–1	(Greece) Iraklis
	Report	Prittas 8'

Stadion Miejski, Kraków
Attendance: 13,377
Referee: Tony Asumaa (Finland)
28 September 2006
20:30

Iraklis (Greece)	0–2 (a.e.t.)	(Poland) Wisła Kraków
	Report	Mijailović 90+4'; Cantoro 100'

Kaftanzoglio Stadium, Thessaloniki
Attendance: 6,331
Referee: Tony Asumaa (Finland)

Wisła Kraków won 2–1 on aggregate.

14 September 2006
20:45

Livorno (Italy)	2–0	(Austria) Superfund
Danilevičius 43'; Lucarelli 49'	Report

Stadio Armando Picchi, Livorno
Attendance: 7,671
Referee: Philippe Kalt (France)
28 September 2006
18:30

Superfund (Austria)	0–1	(Italy) Livorno
	Report	Bakayoko 56'

Waldstadion, Pasching
Attendance: 4,100
Referee: Viktor Kassai (Hungary)

Livorno won 3–0 on aggregate.

14 September 2006
20:15

Dinamo Zagreb (Croatia)	1–2	(France) Auxerre
Eduardo 69'	Report	Jeleń 43'; Niculae 72'

Stadion Maksimir, Zagreb
Attendance: 24,200
Referee: Paolo Dondarini (Italy)
28 September 2006
19:30

Auxerre (France)	3–1	(Croatia) Dinamo Zagreb
Jeleń 35', 41'; Mathis 70'	Report	Eduardo 61' (pen.)

Stade de l'Abbé-Deschamps, Auxerre
Attendance: 4,591
Referee: Alon Yefet (Israel)

Auxerre won 5–2 on aggregate.
