= 2005–06 Campionato Sammarinese di Calcio =

Campionato Sammarinese di Calcio
- Season: 2005–06

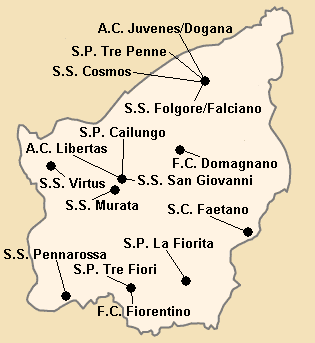
2005–06 Campionato Sammarinese di Calcio team distribution

The 2005–06 Campionato Sammarinese di Calcio season is its twenty-first since its establishment. The top three clubs from each girone will compete in a playoff tournament. The winner will qualify for the first qualifying round of the UEFA Cup next season. This season marks the final season that the winner of the playoffs qualifies for the UEFA Cup. From next season on, the winner of the playoffs will qualify for the first qualifying round of the UEFA Champions League.

== 2005–06 teams ==
=== Girone A (8 teams) ===
- S.S. Cosmos (Serravalle)
- F.C. Domagnano (Domagnano)
- S.C. Faetano (Faetano)
- S.S. Folgore/Falciano (Serravalle)
- S.P. La Fiorita (Montegiardino)
- S.S. San Giovanni (Borgo Maggiore)
- S.P. Tre Fiori (Fiorentino)
- S.P. Tre Penne (Serravalle)

=== Girone B (7 teams) ===
- S.P. Cailungo (Borgo Maggiore)
- F.C. Fiorentino (Fiorentino)
- A.C. Juvenes/Dogana (Serravalle)
- A.C. Libertas (Borgo Maggiore)
- S.S. Murata (San Marino)
- S.S. Pennarossa (Chiesanuova)
- S.S. Virtus (Acquaviva)

== Regular season ==
=== Group A ===
Pos	Team	Pld	W	D	L	GF	GA	GD	Pts	Qualification
1	Tre Fiori	21	14	5	2	37	12	+25	47	Qualification for the championship play–offs
2	Domagnano	21	12	6	3	52	23	+29	42	Qualification for the championship play–offs
3	Tre Penne	21	11	6	4	27	15	+12	39	Qualification for the championship play–offs
4	Folgore/Falciano	21	9	4	8	22	25	−3	31	
5	La Fiorita	21	7	7	7	31	35	−4	28	
6	Faetano	21	6	3	12	32	40	−8	21	
7	Cosmos	21	5	5	11	13	22	−9	20	
8	San Giovanni	21	1	2	18	13	60	−47	5	

Source: rsssf.com

=== Group B ===
Pos	Team	Pld	W	D	L	GF	GA	GD	Pts	Qualification
1	Murata	20	15	4	1	49	20	+29	49	Qualification for the championship play–offs
2	Pennarossa	20	12	6	2	38	19	+19	42	Qualification for the championship play–offs
3	Libertas	20	10	3	7	42	22	+20	33	Qualification for the championship play–offs
4	Virtus	20	7	4	9	23	33	−10	25	
5	Juvenes/Dogana	20	3	8	9	27	44	−17	17	
6	Cailungo	20	4	4	12	11	25	−14	16	
7	Fiorentino	20	3	3	14	30	52	−22	12	

Source: rsssf.com

=== Results ===
All teams play twice against the teams within their own group and once against the teams from the other group.

Home \ Away	CAI	COS	DOM	FAE	FIO	FOL	J/D	LFI	LIB	MUR	PEN	SGI	TFI	TPE	VIR
Cailungo		1–1			0–3	0–1	2–1	1–4	0–1	1–2	0–1		0–0		0–1
Cosmos			0–2	1–2		0–1	1–0	1–0	0–1	0–2		1–0	0–2	0–0	
Domagnano	0–0	2–1		4–1		4–1		4–0	0–0			6–1	1–1	0–1	4–2
Faetano	3–0	2–0	1–3			0–1	1–3	0–1	0–2			1–2	0–1	0–1	1–1
Fiorentino	0–1	0–2	1–4	3–4			2–2		1–3	0–1	0–3 (Note: The match between Fiorentino and Pennarossa in the 1st round (originally finished 0–0) was rated 0–3 for Pennarossa because of the use of an ineligible player.)		1–2		2–0
Folgore		1–0	0–3	3–1	3–3			1–2	0–3	1–2	0–2	3–0	0–1	1–1	0–0
Juvenes/Dogana	1–0		2–4		3–2	0–2			2–2	2–2	1–3	2–2		0–0	2–4
La Fiorita		1–0	2–2	6–2	3–6	0–0	2–2				0–3	3–0	1–3	1–1	
Libertas	0–1				5–1		1–1	4–0		4–5	1–2	5–0	0–1	1–2	5–2
Murata	1–0		2–2	3–4	7–1		4–0	1–1	2–0		2–1			1–0	1–0
Pennarossa	1–1	2–0	2–2	2–2	2–1		2–2		2–1	1–1			2–1		0–0
San Giovanni	0–2	0–2	1–3	0–5	1–1	1–2		0–2		1–5	2–4		2–4	0–5	
Tre Fiori		2–2	1–0	1–1		2–0	6–0	0–0		1–2		2–0		2–0	
Tre Penne	3–1	1–1	3–2	2–1	2–0	0–1		0–0			2–1	1–0	0–1		2–1
Virtus	1–0	0–0			4–2		2–1	4–2	0–3	0–3	0–2	1–0	0–3		

Legend: Blue = home team win; Yellow = draw; Red = away team win.

== Play-off ==
=== First round ===
The second place club will play the third place club from the opposite group.

Team 1	Score	Team 2
Domagnano	1–4	Libertas
Pennarossa	2–3	Tre Penne

=== Second round ===
The first round winners play the first place clubs from each group.

Team 1	Score	Team 2
Tre Fiori	1–0	Tre Penne
Murata	3–1	Libertas

=== Third round ===
The losers from the first and second round play each other. The losers from this round are eliminated.

Team 1	Score	Team 2
Tre Penne	5–3	Domagnano
Libertas	0–2	Pennarossa

=== Fourth round ===
The second round winners play each other. The winner advances to the finals and loser moves to the semifinals.

Team 1	Score	Team 2
Tre Fiori	0–1	Murata

The third round winners play each other and the loser is eliminated.

Team 1	Score	Team 2
Tre Penne	2–3 (a.e.t.)	Pennarossa

=== Semifinal ===
The winner advances to the finals and the loser is eliminated.

Team 1	Score	Team 2
Tre Fiori	1–2	Pennarossa

=== Final ===
11 May 2006

Murata	1–0	Pennarossa
Gasperoni 18'	(Report)

Stadio Olimpico, Serravalle
