= 2006–07 UEFA Cup =

Football tournament

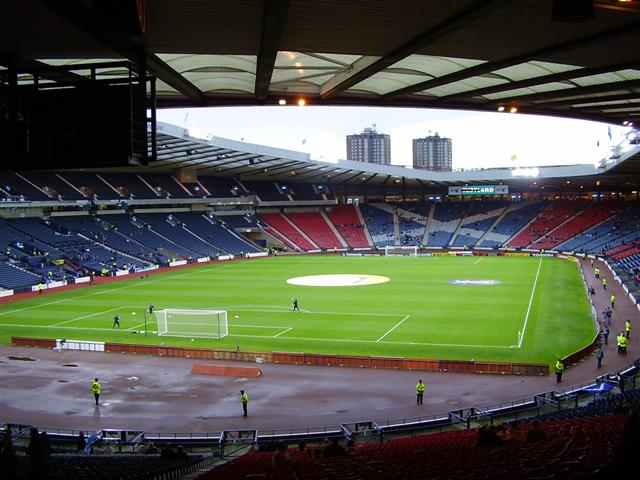
- Hampden Park in Glasgow hosted the final.

Tournament details
- Teams: 80 (competition proper); 131 (qualifying)

Final positions
- Champions: (Spain) Sevilla (2nd title)
- Runners-up: (Spain) Espanyol

Tournament statistics
- Matches played: 219
- Goals scored: 565 (2.58 per match)
- Attendance: 3,905,559 (17,834 per match)
- Top scorer(s): Walter Pandiani (Espanyol); 11 goals
- Best player: Dani Alves (Sevilla)

The 2006–07 UEFA Cup was the 36th edition of the UEFA Cup, Europe's second-tier club football tournament. On 16 May 2007, at Hampden Park, Glasgow, Scotland, Sevilla won their second consecutive UEFA Cup, defeating Espanyol 3–1 on penalties after the match finished 2–2 after extra time. Sevilla became the second side to win the competition for two consecutive seasons, following the hiatus of the original record holder Real Madrid achieved in 1985 and 1986.

Walter Pandiani of Espanyol was the top goals scorer of this UEFA Cup edition with 11 goals.

== Association team allocation ==
A total of 155 teams from 52 UEFA associations competed for the 2006–07 UEFA Cup. Associations were allocated places according to their 2005 UEFA league coefficient, which takes into account their performance in European competitions from 2000–01 to 2004–05.

Below is the qualification scheme for the 2006–07 UEFA Cup:

- Associations 1–6, 16–21 each have three teams qualify
- Associations 7 and 8 each have four teams qualify
- Associations 9–15, 22–39, 41-50 each have two teams qualify
- Associations 40, 51 and 52 each have one team qualify
- The top three associations of the 2005–06 UEFA Fair Play ranking each gain an additional berth
- Eleven winning teams from the 2006 UEFA Intertoto Cup
- 24 teams from the 2006–07 UEFA Champions League (eight third-placed teams from the group stage and the sixteen losers of the third qualifying round)

=== Association ranking ===
Rank	Association	Coeff.	Teams	Notes
1	Spain	73.717	3	+1 (UCL)
2	England	63.224	3	+1 (IC)
3	Italy	61.186	3	+1 (UCL)
4	France	49.469	3	+2 (IC) +1 (UCL)
5	Germany	48.989	3	+1 (IC) +1 (UCL)
6	Portugal	44.666	3	+1 (UCL)
7	Netherlands	39.831	4	+1 (IC) +1 (UCL)
8	Greece	35.498	4	+1 (UCL)
9	Belgium	31.750	2	+1 (FP) +1 (UCL)
10	Scotland	31.750	2	+1 (UCL)
11	Turkey	29.916	2	+1 (IC) +1 (UCL)
12	Czech Republic	27.950	2	+2 (UCL)
13	Russia	25.666	2	+2 (UCL)
14	Austria	24.875	2	+1 (IC) +2 (UCL)
15	Ukraine	24.850	2	+1 (UCL)
16	Israel	21.874	3	+1 (UCL)
17	Serbia and Montenegro	21.249	3	+1 (UCL)
18	Poland	21.000	3	+1 (UCL)

Rank	Association	Coeff.	Teams	Notes
19	Switzerland	20.875	3	+1 (IC)
20	Norway	20.200	3	+1 (FP)
21	Bulgaria	18.540	3	
22	Croatia	18.125	2	+1 (UCL)
23	Denmark	17.200	2	+1 (IC)
24	Hungary	16.331	2	
25	Romania	15.457	2	+1 (UCL)
26	Sweden	15.383	2	+1 (FP)
27	Slovakia	11.665	2	+1 (UCL)
28	Slovenia	9.665	2	+1 (IC)
29	Cyprus	8.165	2	+1 (IC)
30	Bosnia and Herzegovina	7.165	2	
31	Latvia	6.664	2	
32	Finland	6.540	2	
33	Moldova	6.332	2	
34	Georgia	6.165	2	
35	Lithuania	5.332	2	
36	Iceland	4.832	2	

Rank	Association	Coeff.	Teams	Notes
37	Macedonia	4.497	2	+1 (UCL)
38	Republic of Ireland	4.164	2	
39	Belarus	4.082	2	
40	Liechtenstein	4.000	1	
41	Armenia	2.998	2	
42	Malta	2.998	2	
43	Albania	2.665	2	
44	Estonia	2.498	2	
45	Northern Ireland	2.165	2	
46	Wales	1.832	2	
47	Luxembourg	1.665	2	
48	Azerbaijan	1.332	2	
49	Faroe Islands	0.999	2	
50	Kazakhstan	0.666	2	
51	San Marino	0.000	1	
52	Andorra	0.000	1	

Notes

- (FP): Additional berth via UEFA Respect Fair Play ranking (Norway, Belgium, Sweden)
- (IC): Additional berth via 2006 UEFA Intertoto Cup
- (UCL): Additional teams transferred from the 2006–07 UEFA Champions League

=== Distribution ===
The title holder would have been given an additional entry if they did not qualify for the 2006–07 UEFA Champions League or UEFA Cup through domestic performance; however, this additional entry was not necessary as Sevilla, winners of the 2005–06 UEFA Cup, qualified for the UEFA Cup through domestic performance. This means that the following changes to the default allocation system were made to compensate for the vacant title holder spot in the group stage:

- The first UEFA Cup qualifying entrant of association 14 (Austria) gained direct access to the 1st round – Superfund.
- The domestic cup winners of associations 19 and 20 (Switzerland and Norway) are moved from the first qualifying round to the second qualifying round.

	Teams entering in this round	Teams advancing from previous round	Teams transferred from Champions League
First qualifying round (70 teams)	2 domestic league champions from associations 51 and 52; 31 domestic league runners-up from associations 19–50 (except Liechtenstein); 4 domestic league third-placed teams from associations 18–21; 30 domestic cup winning teams from associations 21–50; 3 teams which qualified via Fair Play rankings		
Second qualifying round (64 teams)	6 domestic cup winners from associations 15–20; 3 domestic league runners-up from associations 16–18; 9 domestic league third-placed teams from associations 9–17; 11 Intertoto Cup winners	35 winners from the first qualifying round	
First round (80 teams)	14 domestic cup winners from associations 1–14; 2 domestic league third-placed teams from associations 7 and 8; 5 domestic league fourth-placed teams from associations 4–8; 8 domestic league fifth-placed teams from associations 1–8; 3 domestic league sixth-placed teams from associations 1–3	32 winners from the second qualifying round	16 losers from 2006–07 UEFA Champions League third qualifying round
Group stage (40 teams)		40 winners from the play-off round	
Round 3 (32 teams)		8 group winners from the group stage; 8 group runners-up from the group stage; 8 third-placed teams from the group stage	8 third-placed teams from the 2006–07 UEFA Champions League group stage

=== Teams ===
The labels in the parentheses show how each team qualified for the place of its starting round:

- TH: Title holders
- CW: Cup winners
- CR: Cup runners-up
- LC: League Cup winners
- Nth: League position
- PO: End-of-season European competition play-offs (winners or position)
- IC: Intertoto Cup
- FP: Fair play
- CL: Relegated from the Champions League
  - GS: Third-placed teams from the group stage
  - Q3: Losers from the third qualifying round

Round of 32
(France) Bordeaux (CL GS)	(Portugal) Benfica (CL GS)	(Russia) CSKA Moscow (CL GS)	(Ukraine) Shakhtar Donetsk (CL GS)
(Germany) Werder Bremen (CL GS)	(Greece) AEK Athens (CL GS)	(Russia) Spartak Moscow (CL GS)	(Romania) Steaua București (CL GS)
First round
(Spain) Espanyol (CW)	(Germany) Schalke 04 (4th)	(Greece) Skoda Xanthi (5th)	(Scotland) Heart of Midlothian (CL 3Q)
(Spain) Sevilla^{TH} (5th)	(Germany) Bayer Leverkusen (5th)	(Greece) Atromitos (7th)	(Turkey) Fenerbahçe (CL 3Q)
(Spain) Celta Vigo (6th)	(Germany) Eintracht Frankfurt (CR)	(Belgium) Zulte Waregem (CW)	(Czech Republic) Slovan Liberec (CL 3Q)
(England) Tottenham Hotspur (5th)	(Portugal) Braga (4th)	(Scotland) Rangers (3rd)	(Czech Republic) Mladá Boleslav (CL 3Q)
(England) Blackburn Rovers (6th)	(Portugal) Nacional (5th)	(Turkey) Beşiktaş (CW)	Austria Wien (CL 3Q)
(England) West Ham United (CR)	(Portugal) Vitória de Setúbal (CR)	(Czech Republic) Sparta Prague (CW)	(Austria) Red Bull Salzburg (CL 3Q)
(Italy) Palermo (5th)	(Netherlands) Groningen (PO)	(Russia) Lokomotiv Moscow (3rd)	(Israel) Maccabi Haifa (CL 3Q)
(Italy) Livorno (6th)	(Netherlands) AZ (PO)	(Austria) Superfund (3rd)	(Serbia) Red Star Belgrade (CL 3Q)
(Italy) Parma (7th)	(Netherlands) Feyenoord (PO)	(Spain) Osasuna (CL 3Q)	(Poland) Legia Warsaw (CL 3Q)
(France) Paris Saint-Germain (CW)	(Netherlands) Heerenveen (PO)	(Italy) Chievo (CL 3Q)	(Croatia) Dinamo Zagreb (CL 3Q)
(France) Lens (4th)	(Greece) Panathinaikos (3rd)	(Netherlands) Ajax (CL 3Q)	(Slovakia) Ružomberok (CL 3Q)
(France) Nancy (LC)	(Greece) Iraklis (4th)	(Belgium) Standard Liège (CL 3Q)	(North Macedonia) Rabotnicki (CL 3Q)
Second qualifying round
(Belgium) Club Brugge (3rd)	(Israel) Hapoel Tel Aviv (CW)	(Poland) Wisła Kraków (2nd)	(Netherlands) Twente (IC)
(Scotland) Gretna (CR)	(Israel) Beitar Jerusalem (3rd)	(Switzerland) Sion (CW)	(Turkey) Kayserispor (IC)
(Turkey) Trabzonspor (4th)	(Israel) Bnei Yehuda (4th)	(Norway) Molde (CW)	(Austria) Ried (IC)
(Czech Republic) Slavia Prague (3rd)	(Serbia) Partizan (2nd)	(England) Newcastle United (IC)	(Switzerland) Grasshopper (IC)
(Russia) Rubin Kazan (4th)	(Serbia) Hajduk Kula (4th)	(France) Marseille (IC)	(Denmark) Odense (IC)
(Austria) Mattersburg (CR)	(Serbia) OFK Beograd (CR)	(France) Auxerre (IC)	(Slovenia) Maribor (IC)
(Ukraine) Chornomorets Odesa (3rd)	(Poland) Wisła Płock (CW)	(Germany) Hertha BSC (IC)	(Cyprus) Ethnikos Achna (IC)
(Ukraine) Metalurh Zaporizhzhia (CR)			
First qualifying round
(Poland) Zagłębie Lubin (3rd)	(Slovakia) Artmedia Bratislava (2nd)	(Iceland) Valur (CW)	(Northern Ireland) Glentoran (2nd)
(Switzerland) Basel (2nd)	(Slovakia) Spartak Trnava (3rd)	(Iceland) ÍA (3rd)	(Northern Ireland) Portadown (3rd)
(Switzerland) Young Boys (3rd)	(Slovenia) Koper (CW)	(North Macedonia) Makedonija GP (CW)	(Wales) Rhyl (CW)
(Norway) Start (2nd)	(Slovenia) Domžale (2nd)	(North Macedonia) Vardar (3rd)	(Wales) Llanelli (2nd)
(Norway) Lyn (3rd)	(Cyprus) APOEL (CW)	(Republic of Ireland) Drogheda United (CW)	(Luxembourg) Jeunesse Esch (2nd)
(Bulgaria) CSKA Sofia (CW)	(Cyprus) Omonia (2nd)	(Republic of Ireland) Derry City (2nd)	(Luxembourg) Etzella Ettelbruck (3rd)
(Bulgaria) Litex Lovech (3rd)	(Bosnia and Herzegovina) Orašje (CW)	(Belarus) BATE Borisov (CW)	(Azerbaijan) Qarabağ (CW)
(Bulgaria) Lokomotiv Sofia (4th)	(Bosnia and Herzegovina) Sarajevo (2nd)	(Belarus) Dinamo Minsk (2nd)	(Azerbaijan) Karvan (2nd)
(Croatia) Rijeka (CW)	(Latvia) Ventspils (CW)	(Liechtenstein) Vaduz (CW)	(Faroe Islands) GÍ (CW)
(Croatia) Varteks (3rd)	(Latvia) Skonto (2nd)	(Armenia) Mika (CW)	(Faroe Islands) Skála (2nd)
(Denmark) Randers (CW)	(Finland) Haka (CW)	(Armenia) Banants (3rd)	(Kazakhstan) Tobol (2nd)
(Denmark) Brøndby (2nd)	(Finland) HJK (2nd)	(Malta) Hibernians (CW)	(Kazakhstan) Kairat (CR)
(Hungary) Fehérvár (CW)	(Moldova) Zimbru Chișinău (2nd)	(Malta) Sliema Wanderers (2nd)	(Andorra) Rànger's (1st)
(Hungary) Újpest (2nd)	(Moldova) Nistru Otaci (CR)	(Albania) Tirana (CW)	(San Marino) Murata (1st)
(Romania) Rapid București (CW)	(Georgia (country)) Ameri Tbilisi (CW)	(Albania) Dinamo Tirana (3rd)	(Sweden) Gefle IF (FP)
(Romania) Dinamo București (3rd)	(Georgia (country)) WIT Georgia (2nd)	(Estonia) Levadia Tallinn (2nd)	(Belgium) Roeselare (FP)
(Sweden) IFK Göteborg (2nd)	(Lithuania) Kaunas (CW)	(Estonia) Flora (CR)	(Norway) Brann (FP)
(Sweden) Åtvidabergs FF (CR)	(Lithuania) Sūduva (3rd)		

Notes

1. Italy (ITA): Based on the initial final league positions, Roma, Lazio and Chievo earned direct entries to the UEFA Cup first round. Following 2006 Italian football scandal investigations (resulting in massive points deductions), Lazio lost their European entry entirely while Roma and Chievo were promoted to Champions League. Three Italian UEFA Cup berths were given to Palermo, Livorno, and Parma.
2. Greece (GRE): Greek league 6th-placed team PAOK failed to obtain UEFA licence and were replaced by the 7th-placed team, Atromitos.
3. Serbia (SRB): Serbia and Montenegro 3rd-placed team Voždovac failed to obtain UEFA licence and were replaced by the 4th-placed team, Hajduk Kula. All Serbian club qualified for this season's UEFA competitions though Serbia and Montenegro domestic tournaments, but represented its official successor Serbia.
4. Kazakhstan (KAZ): Kazakhstan Cup winners Astana failed to obtain UEFA licence and were replaced by Cup runners-up, Kairat.

== Round and draw dates ==
The schedule of the competition was as follows (all draws were held at the UEFA headquarters in Nyon, Switzerland, unless stated otherwise).

Schedule for 2006–07 UEFA Cup
Phase	Round	Draw date	First leg	Second leg
Qualifying	First qualifying round	23 June 2006	13 July 2006	27 July 2006
Qualifying	Second qualifying round	28 July 2006	10 August 2006	24 August 2006
First round		25 August 2006 (Monaco)	14 September 2006	28 September 2006
Group stage	Matchday 1	3 October 2006	19 October 2006	
Group stage	Matchday 2	3 October 2006	2 November 2006	
Group stage	Matchday 3	3 October 2006	23 November 2006	
Group stage	Matchday 4	3 October 2006	29–30 November 2006	
Group stage	Matchday 5	3 October 2006	13–14 December 2006	
Knockout stage	Round of 32	15 December 2006	14–15 February 2007	22 February 2007
Knockout stage	Round of 16	15 December 2006	8 March 2007	14–15 March 2007
Knockout stage	Quarter-finals	16 March 2007 (Glasgow)	5 April 2007	12 April 2007
Knockout stage	Semi-finals	16 March 2007 (Glasgow)	26 April 2007	3 May 2007
Knockout stage	Final	16 March 2007 (Glasgow)	16 May 2007 at Hampden Park, Glasgow	

== Early issues ==
=== Italian match-fixing scandal ===
The 2006 Serie A scandal resulted in major changes to the clubs that originally qualified in Italy. Originally, Roma took the cup winners' place as losing finalists in the 2006 Coppa Italia, as the winners, Internazionale finished in the top four in the league and qualified for the Champions League. The other two UEFA Cup places initially went to Lazio and Chievo.

Lazio, however, as well as the remaining three Champions League qualifiers (Juventus, Milan and Fiorentina), were formally indicted on 22 June on charges relating to the scandal.

On 14 July, all four of the indicated clubs were penalised by an Italian court and the Italian Football Federation (FIGC). Results of the FIGC appeal were announced on 25 July. The impact on the UEFA Cup was:

- Lazio were barred from European competition.
- Roma and Chievo were promoted to the Champions League.
- Palermo, Livorno and Parma were granted Italy's places in the UEFA Cup.

=== Greek Football Federation ===
FIFA suspended the Hellenic Football Federation (HFF) from all international competitions on 3 July 2006 because of "political interference in sport" after the Greek government passed a law, giving it control of the sports authorities in Greece. After the law was amended to address FIFA's objections, FIFA reinstated the HFF on 12 July. The Greek government in response, decided to withdraw all of its funding to the Hellenic Football Federation.

== Qualifying rounds ==
=== First qualifying round ===
These matches were held on 13 July and 27 July 2006.

Team 1	Agg.	Team 2	1st leg	2nd leg
Southern–Mediterranean region
Varteks (Croatia)	1–3	(Albania) Tirana	1–1	0–2
Dinamo Tirana (Albania)	1–5	(Bulgaria) CSKA Sofia	0–1	1–4
Koper (Slovenia)	0–6	(Bulgaria) Litex Lovech	0–1	0–5
Sarajevo (Bosnia and Herzegovina)	5–0	(Andorra) Rànger's	3–0	2–0
Orašje (Bosnia and Herzegovina)	0–7	(Slovenia) Domžale	0–2	0–5
Hibernians (Malta)	1–9	(Romania) Dinamo București	0–4	1–5
APOEL (Cyprus)	7–1	(San Marino) Murata	3–1	4–0
Rijeka (Croatia)	3–4	(Cyprus) Omonia	2–2	1–2
Lokomotiv Sofia (Bulgaria)	3–1	(North Macedonia) Makedonija GP	2–0	1–1
Vardar (North Macedonia)	2–7	(Belgium) Roeselare	1–2	1–5
Rapid București (Romania)	6–0	(Malta) Sliema Wanderers	5–0	1–0
Central–East region
Újpest (Hungary)	1–4	(Liechtenstein) Vaduz	0–4	1–0
Zimbru Chișinău (Moldova)	3–2	(Azerbaijan) Qarabağ	1–1	2–1 (a.e.t.)
Mika (Armenia)	1–4	(Switzerland) Young Boys	1–3	0–1
Fehérvár (Hungary)	2–2 (a)	(Kazakhstan) Kairat	1–0	1–2
Zagłębie Lubin (Poland)	1–1 (a)	(Belarus) Dinamo Minsk	1–1	0–0
Karvan (Azerbaijan)	2–0	(Slovakia) Spartak Trnava	1–0	1–0
Ameri Tbilisi (Georgia (country))	2–2 (a)	(Armenia) Banants	0–1	2–1
BATE Borisov (Belarus)	3–0	(Moldova) Nistru Otaci	2–0	1–0
Basel (Switzerland)	3–1	(Kazakhstan) Tobol	3–1	0–0
Artmedia Bratislava (Slovakia)	3–2	(Georgia (country)) WIT Georgia	2–0	1–2
Northern region
HJK (Finland)	2–4	(Republic of Ireland) Drogheda United	1–1	1–3 (a.e.t.)
Brøndby (Denmark)	3–1	(Iceland) Valur	3–1	0–0
Gefle IF (Sweden)	1–2	(Wales) Llanelli	1–2	0–0
Jeunesse Esch (Luxembourg)	0–5	(Latvia) Skonto	0–2	0–3
Åtvidabergs FF (Sweden)	7–0	(Luxembourg) Etzella Ettelbruck	4–0	3–0
Ventspils (Latvia)	4–1	(Faroe Islands) GÍ	2–1	2–0
Glentoran (Northern Ireland)	0–2	(Norway) Brann	0–1	0–1
Randers (Denmark)	2–2 (a)	(Iceland) ÍA	1–0	1–2
Portadown (Northern Ireland)	1–4	(Lithuania) Kaunas	1–3	0–1
Rhyl (Wales)	1–2	(Lithuania) Sūduva	0–0	1–2
Levadia Tallinn (Estonia)	2–1	(Finland) Haka	2–0	0–1
Skála (Faroe Islands)	0–4	(Norway) Start	0–1	0–3
Lyn (Norway)	1–1 (a)	(Estonia) Flora	1–1	0–0
IFK Göteborg (Sweden)	0–2	(Republic of Ireland) Derry City	0–1	0–1

=== Second qualifying round ===
These matches were held on 8 and 10 August (first leg) and 24 August (second leg) 2006.

Team 1	Agg.	Team 2	1st leg	2nd leg
Southern–Mediterranean region
APOEL (Cyprus)	1–2	(Turkey) Trabzonspor	1–1	0–1
Hapoel Tel Aviv (Israel)	4–2	(Slovenia) Domžale	1–2	3–0
CSKA Sofia (Bulgaria)	1–1 (a)	(Serbia) Hajduk Kula	0–0	1–1 (a.e.t.)
Roeselare (Belgium)	2–6	(Cyprus) Ethnikos Achna	2–1	0–5
OFK Beograd (Serbia)	2–5	(France) Auxerre	1–0	1–5
Dinamo București (Romania)	2–1	(Israel) Beitar Jerusalem	1–0	1–1
Partizan (Serbia)	3–2	(Slovenia) Maribor	2–1	1–1
Sarajevo (Bosnia and Herzegovina)	1–2	(Romania) Rapid București	1–0	0–2
Bnei Yehuda (Israel)	0–6	(Bulgaria) Lokomotiv Sofia	0–2	0–4
Omonia (Cyprus)	1–2	(Bulgaria) Litex Lovech	0–0	1–2
Tirana (Albania)	1–5	(Turkey) Kayserispor	0–2	1–3
Central–East region
Artmedia Bratislava (Slovakia)	5–3	(Belarus) Dinamo Minsk	2–1	3–2
Ried (Austria)	0–1	(Switzerland) Sion	0–0	0–1
Fehérvár (Hungary)	1–3	(Switzerland) Grasshopper	1–1	0–2
Karvan (Azerbaijan)	0–2	(Czech Republic) Slavia Prague	0–2	0–0
Chornomorets Odesa (Ukraine)	1–1 (a)	(Poland) Wisła Płock	0–0	1–1
Basel (Switzerland)	2–2 (a)	(Liechtenstein) Vaduz	1–0	1–2
Zimbru Chișinău (Moldova)	0–3	(Ukraine) Metalurh Zaporizhzhia	0–0	0–3
Mattersburg (Austria)	1–2	(Poland) Wisła Kraków	1–1	0–1
Hertha BSC (Germany)	3–2	(Georgia (country)) Ameri Tbilisi	1–0	2–2
Rubin Kazan (Russia)	5–0	(Belarus) BATE Borisov	3–0	2–0
Young Boys (Switzerland)	3–3 (a)	(France) Marseille	3–3	0–0
Northern region
Start (Norway)	1–1 (11–10 p)	(Republic of Ireland) Drogheda United	1–0	0–1 (a.e.t.)
Odense (Denmark)	6–1	(Wales) Llanelli	1–0	5–1
Randers (Denmark)	3–2	(Lithuania) Kaunas	3–1	0–1
Twente (Netherlands)	1–2	(Estonia) Levadia Tallinn	1–1	0–1
Ventspils (Latvia)	0–1	(England) Newcastle United	0–1	0–0
Brann (Norway)	4–4 (a)	(Sweden) Åtvidabergs FF	3–3	1–1
Molde (Norway)	2–1	(Latvia) Skonto	0–0	2–1
Flora (Estonia)	0–4	(Denmark) Brøndby	0–0	0–4
Sūduva (Lithuania)	2–7	(Belgium) Club Brugge	0–2	2–5
Gretna (Scotland)	3–7	(Republic of Ireland) Derry City	1–5	2–2

== First round ==
The matches were held on 14 September (first leg) and 28 September 2006 (second leg).

Team 1	Agg.	Team 2	1st leg	2nd leg
Chornomorets Odesa (Ukraine)	1–4	(Israel) Hapoel Tel Aviv	0–1	1–3
Braga (Portugal)	3–2	(Italy) Chievo	2–0	1–2 (a.e.t.)
Levadia Tallinn (Estonia)	1–3	(England) Newcastle United	0–1	1–2
Molde (Norway)	0–2	(Scotland) Rangers	0–0	0–2
Standard Liège (Belgium)	0–4	(Spain) Celta Vigo	0–1	0–3
Maccabi Haifa (Israel)	4–2	(Bulgaria) Litex Lovech	1–1	3–1
Derry City (Republic of Ireland)	0–2	(France) Paris Saint-Germain	0–0	0–2
Hertha BSC (Germany)	2–3	(Denmark) Odense	2–2	0–1
Legia Warsaw (Poland)	1–2	Austria Wien	1–1	0–1
Panathinaikos (Greece)	2–1	(Ukraine) Metalurh Zaporizhzhia	1–1	1–0
Lokomotiv Moscow (Russia)	2–3	(Belgium) Zulte Waregem	2–1	0–2
Heart of Midlothian (Scotland)	0–2	(Czech Republic) Sparta Prague	0–2	0–0
Fenerbahçe (Turkey)	5–1	(Denmark) Randers	2–1	3–0
Red Bull Salzburg (Austria)	2–4	(England) Blackburn Rovers	2–2	0–2
Schalke 04 (Germany)	2–3	(France) Nancy	1–0	1–3
Ethnikos Achna (Cyprus)	1–3	(France) Lens	0–0	1–3
Slovan Liberec (Czech Republic)	4–1	(Serbia) Red Star Belgrade	2–0	2–1
AZ (Netherlands)	4–3	(Turkey) Kayserispor	3–2	1–1
Rubin Kazan (Russia)	0–2	(Italy) Parma	0–1	0–1
Atromitos (Greece)	1–6	(Spain) Sevilla	1–2	0–4
Eintracht Frankfurt (Germany)	6–2	(Denmark) Brøndby	4–0	2–2
Beşiktaş (Turkey)	4–2	(Bulgaria) CSKA Sofia	2–0	2–2 (a.e.t.)
Vitória de Setúbal (Portugal)	0–3	(Netherlands) Heerenveen	0–3	0–0
Marseille (France)	3–4	(Czech Republic) Mladá Boleslav	1–0	2–4
Åtvidabergs FF (Sweden)	0–8	(Switzerland) Grasshopper	0–3	0–5
Rapid București (Romania)	3–1	(Portugal) Nacional	1–0	2–1 (a.e.t.)
Trabzonspor (Turkey)	2–2 (a)	(Spain) Osasuna	2–2	0–0
Basel (Switzerland)	7–2	(North Macedonia) Rabotnicki	6–2	1–0
West Ham United (England)	0–4	(Italy) Palermo	0–1	0–3
Lokomotiv Sofia (Bulgaria)	2–2 (a)	(Netherlands) Feyenoord	2–2	0–0
Ružomberok (Slovakia)	1–2	(Belgium) Club Brugge	0–1	1–1
Sion (Switzerland)	1–3	(Germany) Bayer Leverkusen	0–0	1–3
Partizan (Serbia)	4–3	(Netherlands) Groningen	4–2	0–1
Skoda Xanthi (Greece)	4–8	(Romania) Dinamo București	3–4	1–4
Slavia Prague (Czech Republic)	0–2	(England) Tottenham Hotspur	0–1	0–1
Start (Norway)	2–9	(Netherlands) Ajax	2–5	0–4
Artmedia Bratislava (Slovakia)	3–5	(Spain) Espanyol	2–2	1–3
Wisła Kraków (Poland)	2–1	(Greece) Iraklis	0–1	2–0 (a.e.t.)
Livorno (Italy)	3–0	(Austria) Superfund	2–0	1–0
Dinamo Zagreb (Croatia)	2–5	(France) Auxerre	1–2	1–3

== Group stage ==
Teams that have qualified for the group stage of the 2006–07 UEFA Cup
Red: Group A; Yellow: Group B; Green: Group C; Black: Group D;
Purple: Group E; Pink: Group F; Blue: Group G; Orange: Group H.

The top three teams (highlighted in green) of each group qualified for the next round. Based on paragraph 4.06 in the UEFA regulations for the current season, if two or more teams are equal on points on completion of all the group matches, the following criteria are applied to determine the rankings:

1. superior goal difference from all group matches played;
2. higher number of goals scored in all group matches played;
3. higher number of goals scored away in all group matches played;
4. higher number of wins;
5. higher number of away wins;
6. higher number of coefficient points accumulated by the club in question, as well as its association, over the previous five seasons (see paragraph 6.03 of the UEFA regulations).

=== Group A ===
Pos	Team	Pld	W	D	L	GF	GA	GD	Pts	Qualification	RAN	MHA	LIV	AUX	PTZ
1	(Scotland) Rangers	4	3	1	0	8	4	+4	10	Advance to knockout stage	—	2–0	—	—	1–0
2	(Israel) Maccabi Haifa	4	2	1	1	5	4	+1	7	Advance to knockout stage	—	—	—	3–1	1–0
3	(Italy) Livorno	4	1	2	1	5	5	0	5	Advance to knockout stage	2–3	1–1	—	—	—
4	(France) Auxerre	4	1	1	2	7	7	0	4		2–2	—	0–1	—	—
5	(Serbia) Partizan	4	0	1	3	2	7	−5	1		—	—	1–1	1–4	—

=== Group B ===
Pos	Team	Pld	W	D	L	GF	GA	GD	Pts	Qualification	TOT	DB	LEV	BJK	BRU
1	(England) Tottenham Hotspur	4	4	0	0	9	2	+7	12	Advance to knockout stage	—	3–1	—	—	3–1
2	(Romania) Dinamo București	4	2	1	1	6	6	0	7	Advance to knockout stage	—	—	2–1	2–1	—
3	(Germany) Bayer Leverkusen	4	1	1	2	4	5	−1	4	Advance to knockout stage	0–1	—	—	2–1	—
4	(Turkey) Beşiktaş	4	1	0	3	4	7	−3	3		0–2	—	—	—	2–1
5	(Belgium) Club Brugge	4	0	2	2	4	7	−3	2		—	1–1	1–1	—	—

=== Group C ===
Pos	Team	Pld	W	D	L	GF	GA	GD	Pts	Qualification	AZ	SEV	BRA	LIB	GRA
1	(Netherlands) AZ	4	3	1	0	12	5	+7	10	Advance to knockout stage	—	—	3–0	2–2	—
2	(Spain) Sevilla	4	2	1	1	7	2	+5	7	Advance to knockout stage	1–2	—	2–0	—	—
3	(Portugal) Braga	4	2	0	2	6	5	+1	6	Advance to knockout stage	—	—	—	4–0	2–0
4	(Czech Republic) Slovan Liberec	4	1	2	1	6	7	−1	5		—	0–0	—	—	4–1
5	(Switzerland) Grasshopper	4	0	0	4	3	15	−12	0		2–5	0–4	—	—	—

=== Group D ===
Pos	Team	Pld	W	D	L	GF	GA	GD	Pts	Qualification	PAR	OSA	LEN	ODE	HVN
1	(Italy) Parma	4	3	0	1	6	6	0	9	Advance to knockout stage	—	0–3	—	—	2–1
2	(Spain) Osasuna	4	2	1	1	7	4	+3	7	Advance to knockout stage	—	—	—	3–1	0–0
3	(France) Lens	4	1	1	2	5	5	0	4	Advance to knockout stage	1–2	3–1	—	—	—
4	(Denmark) Odense	4	1	1	2	5	6	−1	4		1–2	—	1–1	—	—
5	(Netherlands) Heerenveen	4	1	1	2	2	4	−2	4		—	—	1–0	0–2	—

=== Group E ===
Pos	Team	Pld	W	D	L	GF	GA	GD	Pts	Qualification	BLB	NAN	FEY	WIS	BSL
1	(England) Blackburn Rovers	4	3	1	0	6	1	+5	10	Advance to knockout stage	—	1–0	—	—	3–0
2	(France) Nancy	4	2	1	1	7	4	+3	7	Advance to knockout stage	—	—	3–0	2–1	—
3	(Netherlands) Feyenoord	4	1	2	1	4	5	−1	5	Advance to knockout stage	0–0	—	—	3–1	—
4	(Poland) Wisła Kraków	4	1	0	3	6	8	−2	3		1–2	—	—	—	3–1
5	(Switzerland) Basel	4	0	2	2	4	9	−5	2		—	2–2	1–1	—	—

=== Group F ===
Pos	Team	Pld	W	D	L	GF	GA	GD	Pts	Qualification	ESP	AJX	ZWA	PRA	AUS
1	(Spain) Espanyol	4	4	0	0	11	2	+9	12	Advance to knockout stage	—	—	6–2	—	1–0
2	(Netherlands) Ajax	4	2	1	1	6	2	+4	7	Advance to knockout stage	0–2	—	—	—	3–0
3	(Belgium) Zulte Waregem	4	2	0	2	9	11	−2	6	Advance to knockout stage	—	0–3	—	3–1	—
4	(Czech Republic) Sparta Prague	4	1	1	2	2	5	−3	4		0–2	0–0	—	—	—
5	Austria Wien	4	0	0	4	1	9	−8	0		—	—	1–4	0–1	—

=== Group G ===
Pos	Team	Pld	W	D	L	GF	GA	GD	Pts	Qualification	PAN	PSG	HTA	RAP	MLA
1	(Greece) Panathinaikos	4	2	1	1	3	4	−1	7	Advance to knockout stage	—	—	2–0	0–0	—
2	(France) Paris Saint-Germain	4	1	2	1	6	4	+2	5	Advance to knockout stage	4–0	—	2–4	—	—
3	(Israel) Hapoel Tel Aviv	4	1	2	1	7	7	0	5	Advance to knockout stage	—	—	—	2–2	1–1
4	(Romania) Rapid București	4	0	4	0	3	3	0	4		—	0–0	—	—	1–1
5	(Czech Republic) Mladá Boleslav	4	0	3	1	2	3	−1	3		0–1	0–0	—	—	—

=== Group H ===
Pos	Team	Pld	W	D	L	GF	GA	GD	Pts	Qualification	NEW	CEL	FEN	PAL	EIN
1	(England) Newcastle United	4	3	1	0	4	1	+3	10	Advance to knockout stage	—	2–1	1–0	—	—
2	(Spain) Celta Vigo	4	1	2	1	4	4	0	5	Advance to knockout stage	—	—	1–0	—	1–1
3	(Turkey) Fenerbahçe	4	1	1	2	5	4	+1	4	Advance to knockout stage	—	—	—	3–0	2–2
4	(Italy) Palermo	4	1	1	2	3	6	−3	4		0–1	1–1	—	—	—
5	(Germany) Eintracht Frankfurt	4	0	3	1	4	5	−1	3		0–0	—	—	1–2	—

== Knockout stage ==
=== Bracket ===
Round of 32
(Russia) CSKA Moscow	0	0	0
(Israel) Maccabi Haifa	0	1	1
(Italy) Livorno	1	0	1
(Spain) Espanyol	2	2	4
(Greece) AEK Athens	0	0	0
(France) Paris Saint-Germain	2	2	4
(Portugal) Benfica	1	2	3
(Romania) Dinamo București	0	1	1
(Belgium) Zulte Waregem	1	0	1
(England) Newcastle United	3	1	4
(Turkey) Fenerbahçe	3	2	5
(Netherlands) AZ (a)	3	2	5
(Russia) Spartak Moscow	1	1	2
(Spain) Celta Vigo	1	2	3
(Germany) Werder Bremen	3	1	4
(Netherlands) Ajax	0	3	3
(France) Lens	3	0	3
(Greece) Panathinaikos	1	0	1
(Germany) Bayer Leverkusen	3	0	3
(England) Blackburn Rovers	2	0	2
(Israel) Hapoel Tel Aviv	2	0	2
(Scotland) Rangers	1	4	5
(France) Bordeaux	0	0	0
(Spain) Osasuna (a.e.t.)	0	1	1
(Romania) Steaua București	0	0	0
(Spain) Sevilla	2	1	3
(Ukraine) Shakhtar Donetsk	1	1	2
(France) Nancy	1	0	1
(Portugal) Braga	1	1	2
(Italy) Parma	0	0	0
(Netherlands) Feyenoord	—	—	—
(England) Tottenham Hotspur (w/o)	—	—	—

Round of 16
(Israel) Maccabi Haifa	0	0	0
(Spain) Espanyol	0	4	4
(France) Paris Saint-Germain	2	1	3
(Portugal) Benfica	1	3	4
(England) Newcastle United	4	0	4
(Netherlands) AZ (a)	2	2	4
(Spain) Celta Vigo	0	0	0
(Germany) Werder Bremen	1	2	3
(France) Lens	2	0	2
(Germany) Bayer Leverkusen	0	3	3
(Scotland) Rangers	1	0	1
(Spain) Osasuna	1	1	2
(Spain) Sevilla (a.e.t.)	2	3	5
(Ukraine) Shakhtar Donetsk	2	2	4
(Portugal) Braga	2	2	4
(England) Tottenham Hotspur	3	3	6

Quarter-finals
(Spain) Espanyol	3	0	3
(Portugal) Benfica	2	0	2
(Netherlands) AZ	0	1	1
(Germany) Werder Bremen	0	4	4
(Germany) Bayer Leverkusen	0	0	0
(Spain) Osasuna	3	1	4
(Spain) Sevilla	2	2	4
(England) Tottenham Hotspur	1	2	3

Semi-finals
(Spain) Espanyol	3	2	5
(Germany) Werder Bremen	0	1	1
(Spain) Osasuna	1	0	1
(Spain) Sevilla	0	2	2

Final
16 May – Glasgow
(Spain) Espanyol	2 (1)
(Spain) Sevilla (p)	2 (3)

=== Round of 32 ===
The first legs were held on 14 February and 15 February 2007, while the second legs were held on 22 February 2007.

Team 1	Agg.	Team 2	1st leg	2nd leg
Zulte Waregem (Belgium)	1–4	(England) Newcastle United	1–3	0–1
Braga (Portugal)	2–0	(Italy) Parma	1–0	1–0
Lens (France)	3–1	(Greece) Panathinaikos	3–1	0–0
Bayer Leverkusen (Germany)	3–2	(England) Blackburn Rovers	3–2	0–0
Hapoel Tel Aviv (Israel)	2–5	(Scotland) Rangers	2–1	0–4
Livorno (Italy)	1–4	(Spain) Espanyol	1–2	0–2
Feyenoord (Netherlands)	w/o (Note: On 19 January 2007, UEFA declared that Feyenoord had been disqualified after crowd misbehaviour in their final group stage match against Nancy. UEFA announced on 25 January that Tottenham Hotspur had received a bye. This was confirmed after a final appeal.)	(England) Tottenham Hotspur	Canc.	Canc.
Fenerbahçe (Turkey)	5–5 (a)	(Netherlands) AZ	3–3	2–2
Werder Bremen (Germany)	4–3	(Netherlands) Ajax	3–0	1–3
Spartak Moscow (Russia)	2–3	(Spain) Celta Vigo	1–1	1–2
CSKA Moscow (Russia)	0–1	(Israel) Maccabi Haifa	0–0	0–1
AEK Athens (Greece)	0–4	(France) Paris Saint-Germain	0–2	0–2
Benfica (Portugal)	3–1	(Romania) Dinamo București	1–0	2–1
Steaua București (Romania)	0–3	(Spain) Sevilla	0–2	0–1
Shakhtar Donetsk (Ukraine)	2–1	(France) Nancy	1–1	1–0
Bordeaux (France)	0–1	(Spain) Osasuna	0–0	0–1 (a.e.t.)

=== Round of 16 ===
The first legs were held on 8 March 2007, while the second legs were held on 14 and 15 March 2007.

Team 1	Agg.	Team 2	1st leg	2nd leg
Newcastle United (England)	4–4 (a)	(Netherlands) AZ	4–2	0–2
Maccabi Haifa (Israel)	0–4	(Spain) Espanyol	0–0	0–4
Rangers (Scotland)	1–2	(Spain) Osasuna	1–1	0–1
Braga (Portugal)	4–6	(England) Tottenham Hotspur	2–3	2–3
Sevilla (Spain)	5–4	(Ukraine) Shakhtar Donetsk	2–2	3–2 (a.e.t.)
Lens (France)	2–4	(Germany) Bayer Leverkusen	2–1	0–3
Paris Saint-Germain (France)	3–4	(Portugal) Benfica	2–1	1–3
Celta Vigo (Spain)	0–3	(Germany) Werder Bremen	0–1	0–2

=== Quarter-finals ===
The draw for the final stages, included quarter-finals and semi-finals, was held on 16 March 2007 in Glasgow, Scotland. The quarter-final matches were played on 5 April and 12 April 2007.

Team 1	Agg.	Team 2	1st leg	2nd leg
AZ (Netherlands)	1–4	(Germany) Werder Bremen	0–0	1–4
Bayer Leverkusen (Germany)	0–4	(Spain) Osasuna	0–3	0–1
Sevilla (Spain)	4–3	(England) Tottenham Hotspur	2–1	2–2
Espanyol (Spain)	3–2	(Portugal) Benfica	3–2	0–0

=== Semi-finals ===
The semi-final matches were played on 26 April and 3 May 2007.

Team 1	Agg.	Team 2	1st leg	2nd leg
Espanyol (Spain)	5–1	(Germany) Werder Bremen	3–0	2–1
Osasuna (Spain)	1–2	(Spain) Sevilla	1–0	0–2

=== Final ===
The final was played on 16 May 2007 at Hampden Park in Glasgow, Scotland.

16 May 2007
19:45 UTC+1

Espanyol (Spain)	2–2 (a.e.t.)	(Spain) Sevilla
Riera 28'; Jônatas 115'	Report	Adriano 18'; Kanouté 105'
Penalties
L. García (penalty missed); Pandiani (penalty scored); Jônatas (penalty missed); Torrejón (penalty missed)	1–3	(penalty scored) Kanouté; (penalty scored) Dragutinović; (penalty missed) Dani Alves; (penalty scored) Puerta

Hampden Park, Glasgow
Attendance: 47,602
Referee: Massimo Busacca (Switzerland)

== Top goalscorers ==
Rank	Name	Team	Goals	Minutes played
1	(Uruguay) Walter Pandiani	(Spain) Espanyol	11	1118'
2	(Romania) Claudiu Niculescu	(Romania) Dinamo București	8	602'
3	(Netherlands) Klaas-Jan Huntelaar	(Netherlands) Ajax	7	520'
3	(Bulgaria) Dimitar Berbatov	(England) Tottenham Hotspur	7	697'
3	(Georgia (country)) Shota Arveladze	(Netherlands) AZ	7	942'
6	(Portugal) Pauleta	(France) Paris Saint-Germain	6	591'
6	(Nigeria) Obafemi Martins	(England) Newcastle United	6	642'
8	(Italy) Cristiano Lucarelli	(Italy) Livorno	5	616'
8	(Belgium) Tim Matthys	(Belgium) Zulte Waregem	5	642'
8	(Spain) Coro	(Spain) Espanyol	5	662'
8	(Republic of Ireland) Robbie Keane	(England) Tottenham Hotspur	5	708'
8	(Spain) Luis García	(Spain) Espanyol	5	1000'

== See also ==
- 2006–07 UEFA Champions League
- 2006 UEFA Intertoto Cup
- 2007 UEFA Super Cup
