= Sébastien Dufoor =

Belgian former footballer

Personal information
- Date of birth: 7 July 1981 (age 45)
- Place of birth: Ganshoren, Belgium
- Height: 1.89 m (6 ft 2 in)
- Position: Forward

Senior career*
Years	Team	Apps	(Gls)
2000–2002	Verbroedering Denderhoutem		
2002–2005	Red Star Waasland		
2005–2007	Roeselare		
2007–2008	Dender		
2008–2010	Tienen		
2011	White Star Woluwé		
2012	Grimbergen		
- * Club domestic league appearances and goals

Sébastien Dufoor (born 7 July 1981) is a Belgian former footballer who played as a forward.
