= Vahe Tadevosyan =

Armenian footballer

Personal information
- Full name: Vahe Tadevosyan
- Date of birth: 17 October 1983 (age 43)
- Place of birth: Yerevan, Soviet Union
- Height: 1.85 m (6 ft 1 in)
- Position: Forward

Senior career*
Years	Team	Apps	(Gls)
2001–2003	Kotayk Abovian	36	(2)
2004–2005	Ararat Yerevan	23	(6)
2005–2006	Banants Yerevan	36	(15)
2006–2008	FC Aarau	20	(2)
2009–2010	Banants Yerevan	?	(?)
2010–present	Shengavit	0	(0)

International career^{‡}
2004 – 2005	Armenia U-21	3	(0)
- * Club domestic league appearances and goals as of 24 February 2010 ‡ National team caps and goals as of 3 October 2007

Vahe Tadevosyan (Armenian: Վահե Թադեւոսյան; born 17 October 1983, in Yerevan, Soviet Union) is an Armenian football striker. He has made several appearances for the Armenian U-21 side.
