= Marcos (footballer, born 1979) =

Brazilian footballer

Personal information
- Full name: Marcos Roberto Pereira dos Santos
- Date of birth: 29 August 1979 (age 47)
- Place of birth: Salto, São Paulo, Brazil
- Height: 1.82 m (5 ft 11 1/2 in)
- Position: Striker

Senior career*
Years	Team	Apps	(Gls)
1999 – 2002	Guarani		
2002 – 2004	Sertãozinho		
2004 – 2005	CA Bizertin		
2005 – 2006	Espérance		
2006 – 2009	Young Boys	27	(8)
2007 – 2008	→ Ajaccio (loan)	36	(9)
2008 – 2009	→ Strasbourg (loan)	29	(5)
2009 – 2010	Strasbourg	11	(0)
2010 – 2014	Troyes	123	(28)
- * Club domestic league appearances and goals as of 4 September 2017

Marcos Roberto Pereira dos Santos (born 29 August 1979), usually known as Marcos, is a Brazilian former football striker.

He has also played for Club Athletic Bizertin and Espérance.
