= Luciano De Bruno =

Argentine footballer

Personal information
- Full name: Luciano Ángel De Bruno
- Date of birth: 6 August 1978 (age 48)
- Place of birth: Rosario, Argentina
- Height: 1.80 m (5 ft 11 in)
- Position: Midfielder

Senior career*
Years	Team	Apps	(Gls)
1999–2002	Rosario Central	35	(2)
2003	Chiapas	12	(0)
2003–2004	Talleres de Córdoba	36	(9)
2004–2005	Lanús	20	(2)
2005–2006	Tiro Federal	56	(4)
2006–2007	Hapoel Tel Aviv	22	(2)
2007	AEL Limassol	14	(4)
2008–2009	Gimnasia de Jujuy	8	(1)
2009	Correcaminos UAT	6	(0)
2010	Macará	12	(0)
2011	Alumni de Villa María		
2011–2012	Tiro Federal		
2012	Deportivo Maipú		
- * Club domestic league appearances and goals

Luciano Ángel De Bruno (born 6 August 1978) is an Argentine former football offensive midfielder.
