= Antonio Puerta Trophy =

- Organiser(s): Sevilla FC
- Founded: 2008; 18 years ago
- Region: Seville, Spain
- Teams: 2
- Related competitions: Joan Gamper Trophy
- Current champions: (England) Aston Villa (2026)
- Most championships: (Spain) Sevilla (12 titles)
- Broadcaster(s): Canal Sur, SFC Televisión, Arena Sport, TV3 (in 2011 edition)

The Antonio Puerta Trophy is an annual summer tournament hosted by Sevilla FC since 2008. The tournament is dedicated to Antonio Puerta, who died on 28 August 2007 (at the age of 22) after suffering a heart injury during the inaugural match of the 2007–08 La Liga season against Getafe.

== List of champions ==
No.	Year	Winners	Score	Runners-up
1	2008	(Spain) Sevilla	2–0	(Spain) Málaga
2	2009	(Spain) Sevilla	2–1	(Spain) Xerez
3	2010	(Spain) Granada	1–1 (4–2 p)	(Spain) Sevilla
4	2011	(Spain) Sevilla	5–0	(Spain) Espanyol
5	2012	(Spain) Sevilla	2–0	(Spain) Deportivo La Coruña
6	2013	(Spain) Sevilla	1–1 (4–2 p)	(Spain) Almería
7	2014	(Spain) Sevilla	2–0	(Spain) Córdoba
8	2016	(Argentina) Boca Juniors	4–3	(Spain) Sevilla
9	2017	(Spain) Sevilla	2–1	(Italy) Roma
10	2019	(Spain) Sevilla	2–0	(Germany) Schalke 04
11	2022	(Spain) Sevilla	1–0	(Spain) Cádiz
12	2023	(Spain) Sevilla	1–1 (4–1 p)	(Ecuador) Independiente del Valle
13	2024	(Spain) Sevilla	1–0	(Saudi Arabia) Al-Ittihad
14	2025	(Spain) Sevilla	2–2 (4–1 p)	(Saudi Arabia) Al Qadsiah
15	2026	(England) Aston Villa	3–1	(Spain) Sevilla

== Match details ==
=== 2008 ===
The match was played on 23 August 2008 against Málaga, a team promoted to La Liga that year. It served to commemorate Antonio Puerta and all the victims of the Spanair Flight 5022, the aviation accident which occurred three days before.

23 August 2008
22:00 CEST

Sevilla (Spain)	2–0	(Spain) Málaga
Luís Fabiano 29'; Renato 64'	Report

Ramón Sánchez Pizjuán, Seville
Attendance: 25,000
Referee: Domingo Palomino Núñez

=== 2009 ===
Played on 21 August 2009 against Xerez, team also promoted to Liga BBVA that year as occurred in 2008 with Málaga.

21 August 2009
21:30 CEST

Sevilla (Spain)	2–1	(Spain) Xerez
José Carlos 39'; Perotti 50'	Report	Míchel 87'

Ramón Sánchez Pizjuán, Seville
Attendance: 21,000
Referee: Andrés Ceballos Silva

=== 2010 ===
The match was played in November, during a Liga BBVA break because during the UEFA Champions League group stage (matchday 5). The rival this time was Granada, the team promoted that season to Liga Adelante. It was the first time since the tournament's inception that Sevilla lost the final match.

24 November 2010
22:00 CET

Sevilla (Spain)	1–1	(Spain) Granada
José Carlos 58'	Report	Calvo 9'
Penalties
Renato (penalty scored); Campaña (penalty missed); José Carlos (penalty missed); Rodri (penalty scored)	2–4	(penalty scored) Siqueira; (penalty scored) Pérez; (penalty scored) Abel; (penalty scored) Lucena

Ramón Sánchez Pizjuán, Seville
Attendance: 3,000
Referee: Israel Mariscal Sánchez

=== 2011 ===
The fourth edition of the tournament was celebrated in summer again, during the pre-season. The guest for the first time wasn't Andalusian; it was Espanyol, which suffered a similar tragedy to Sevilla with the death of a player (Daniel Jarque in 2009).

4 August 2011
22:00 CEST

Sevilla (Spain)	5–0	(Spain) Espanyol
Rodri 25', 76'; Del Moral 45+1'; Kanouté 73', 90'	Report

Ramón Sánchez Pizjuán, Seville
Attendance: 20,000
Referee: Paradas Romero

=== 2012 ===
The match was played on 8 August due to the early start of the 2012–13 La Liga season, against Deportivo La Coruña, a traditional Sevilla "friend" team.

8 August 2012
22:00 CEST

Sevilla (Spain)	2–0	(Spain) Deportivo La Coruña
Negredo 30'; Trochowski 44'	Report

Ramón Sánchez Pizjuán, Seville
Attendance: 25,000
Referee: Pedro Jesús Pérez Montero

=== 2013 ===
14 November 2013
20:45 CET

Sevilla (Spain)	1–1	(Spain) Almería
Perotti 81' (pen.)	Report	Fernández 90+2'
Penalties
Perotti (penalty missed); Gameiro (penalty scored); Vitolo (penalty scored); Figueiras (penalty scored); Cristóforo (penalty scored)	4–2	(penalty missed) Rafita; (penalty scored) Tébar; (penalty scored) Silva; (penalty missed) Díaz

Ramón Sánchez Pizjuán, Seville
Attendance: 20,000
Referee: Juan Manuel López Amaya

=== 2014 ===
8 August 2014
21:30 CEST

Sevilla (Spain)	2–0	(Spain) Córdoba
Suárez 81'; Bacca 84'	Report

Ramón Sánchez Pizjuán, Seville
Attendance: 20,000
Referee: David Fernández Borbalán

=== 2016 ===
Sevilla's opponents were Boca Juniors, winners of the 2015 Argentine Primera División and the first non-Spanish team to take part. About 2,000 visiting supporters (most of them expatriate Argentines living in European countries) attended the match. Boca Juniors players wore a patch on their jerseys displaying the "16" worn by Puerta as a tribute to him. Carlos Tevez, with two goals scored and two assists, was the man of match.

11 November 2016
20:40 CEST

Sevilla (Spain)	3–4	(Argentina) Boca Juniors
Nzonzi 30'; Kolodziejczak 84'; Vietto 88'	Report	Benedetto 24'; Pavón 38'; Tevez 59', 90+4'

Ramón Sánchez Pizjuán, Seville
Attendance: 19,906
Referee: David Fernández Borbalán

Team details

Sevilla
Boca Juniors

GK	25	(Italy) Salvatore Sirigu
DF	3	(Brazil) Mariano
DF	6	(Portugal) Daniel Carriço
DF	5	(France) Timothée Kolodziejczak
MF	8	(Spain) Vicente Iborra
MF	4	(Argentina) Matías Kranevitter
MF	15	(France) Steven Nzonzi	(substituted off) 67'
MF	19	(Brazil) Ganso
MF	11	(Argentina) Joaquín Correa	(substituted off) 64'
FW	17	(Spain) Pablo Sarabia
FW	12	(France) Wissam Ben Yedder
Substitutes:
MF	22	(Argentina) Franco Vázquez	(substituted on) 67'
FW	9	(Argentina) Luciano Vietto	(substituted on) 64'
Manager:
(Argentina) Jorge Sampaoli

GK	1	(Argentina) Guillermo Sara
DF	29	(Argentina) Leonardo Jara
DF	2	(Argentina) Fernando Tobio
DF	25	(Argentina) Juan Manuel Insaurralde
DF	3	(Argentina) Jonathan Silva
MF	30	(Uruguay) Rodrigo Bentancur	(substituted off) 75'
MF	5	(Argentina) Fernando Gago	(substituted off) 61'
MF	7	(Argentina) Cristian Pavón	(substituted off) 75'
FW	10	(Argentina) Carlos Tevez
FW	26	(Argentina) Ricardo Centurión	(substituted off) 61'
FW	9	(Argentina) Darío Benedetto	(substituted off) 75'
Substitutes:
MF	8	(Argentina) Pablo Pérez	(substituted on) 61'
MF	15	(Argentina) Fernando Zuqui	(substituted on) 61'
FW	19	(Argentina) Walter Bou	(substituted on) 75'
MF	11	(Argentina) Federico Carrizo	(substituted on) 75'
MF	20	(Argentina) Andrés Cubas	(substituted on) 75'
Manager:
(Argentina) Guillermo Barros Schelotto

=== 2017 ===
10 August 2017
22:00 CEST

Sevilla (Spain)	2–1	(Italy) Roma
Escudero 73'; Nolito 90'	Report	Džeko 90+1'

Ramón Sánchez Pizjuán, Seville
Attendance: 29,298
Referee: José Luis Munuera Montero

=== 2019 ===
22 March 2019
20:45 CET

Sevilla (Spain)	2–0	(Germany) Schalke 04
Mesa 35'; Munir 72' (pen.)	Report

Ramón Sánchez Pizjuán, Seville
Attendance: 25,000
Referee: Mario Melero López

=== 2022 ===
6 August 2022
21:00 CEST

Sevilla (Spain)	1–0	(Spain) Cádiz
Delaney 68'	Report

Ramón Sánchez Pizjuán, Seville
Referee: Mario Melero López

=== 2023 ===
The 2023 edition of the Antonio Puerta Trophy also formed the inaugural edition of the UEFA–CONMEBOL Club Challenge, the one-off match between the champions of the UEFA Europa League and Copa Sudamericana.

19 July 2023
22:00 CEST

Sevilla (Spain)	1–1	(Ecuador) Independiente del Valle
Ortiz 90+1'	Report	Díaz 10'
Penalties
Jordán (penalty scored); Romero (penalty scored); Idrissi (penalty scored); Gómez (penalty scored)	4–1	(penalty missed) Faravelli; (penalty scored) Hoyos; (penalty missed) Moreno

Ramón Sánchez Pizjuán, Seville
Attendance: 19,407
Referee: Rade Obrenović (Slovenia)

=== 2024 ===
26 July 2024
22:00 CEST

Sevilla (Spain)	1–0	(Saudi Arabia) Al-Ittihad
Ocampos 42' (pen.)	Report

Ramón Sánchez Pizjuán, Seville
Attendance: 21,475
Referee: Alejandro Quintero González

=== 2025 ===
4 August 2025
22:00 CEST

Sevilla (Spain)	2–2	(Saudi Arabia) Al Qadsiah
Lukébakio 7'; Idumbo 59'	Report	Retegui 29'; Carvalho 90+4'
Penalties
Fernández (penalty scored); Pedrosa (penalty scored); Bueno (penalty scored); Castrín (penalty scored)	4–1	(penalty missed) Nacho; (penalty scored) Quiñones; (penalty missed) al-Qahtani

Ramón Sánchez Pizjuán, Seville

=== 2026 ===
2 October 2026
20:30 CEST

Sevilla (Spain)	1–3	(England) Aston Villa
Romero 53'	Report	Barkley 71'; Garnacho 79'; Jenner 83'

Ramón Sánchez Pizjuán, Seville

== Titles by team ==
Team	Titles	Years won
(Spain) Sevilla	12	2008, 2009, 2011, 2012, 2013, 2014, 2017, 2019, 2022, 2023, 2024, 2025
(Spain) Granada	1	2010
(Argentina) Boca Juniors	1	2016
(England) Aston Villa	1	2026

== Goalscorers ==
Goals	Player	Team	Editions
2	(Spain) José Carlos	(Spain) Sevilla	2009, 2010
2	(Spain) Rodri Ríos	(Spain) Sevilla	2011
2	(Mali) Frédéric Kanouté	(Spain) Sevilla	2011
2	(Argentina) Diego Perotti	(Spain) Sevilla	2009, 2013
2	(Argentina) Carlos Tevez	(Argentina) Boca Juniors	2016
1	(Brazil) Luís Fabiano	(Spain) Sevilla	2008
1	(Brazil) Renato	(Spain) Sevilla	2008
1	(Spain) Míchel	(Spain) Xerez	2009
1	(Spain) Carlos Calvo	(Spain) Granada	2010
1	(Spain) Manu del Moral	(Spain) Sevilla	2011
1	(Spain) Álvaro Negredo	(Spain) Sevilla	2012
1	(Germany) Piotr Trochowski	(Spain) Sevilla	2012
1	(Spain) Christian Fernández	(Spain) Almería	2013
1	(Spain) Denis Suárez	(Spain) Sevilla	2014
1	(Colombia) Carlos Bacca	(Spain) Sevilla	2014
1	(Argentina) Darío Benedetto	(Argentina) Boca Juniors	2016
1	(Argentina) Cristian Pavón	(Argentina) Boca Juniors	2016
1	(France) Steven Nzonzi	(Spain) Sevilla	2016
1	(France) Timothée Kolodziejczak	(Spain) Sevilla	2016
1	(Argentina) Luciano Vietto	(Spain) Sevilla	2016
1	(Bosnia and Herzegovina) Edin Džeko	(Italy) Roma	2017
1	(Spain) Sergio Escudero	(Spain) Sevilla	2017
1	(Spain) Nolito	(Spain) Sevilla	2017
1	(Spain) Roque Mesa	(Spain) Sevilla	2019
1	(Morocco) Munir	(Spain) Sevilla	2019
1	(Denmark) Thomas Delaney	(Spain) Sevilla	2022
1	(Argentina) Lautaro Díaz	(Ecuador) Independiente del Valle	2023
1	(Spain) Pedro Ortiz	(Spain) Sevilla	2023
1	(Argentina) Lucas Ocampos	(Spain) Sevilla	2024
1	(Belgium) Dodi Lukébakio	(Spain) Sevilla	2025
1	(Belgium) Stanis Idumbo	(Spain) Sevilla	2025
1	(Italy) Mateo Retegui	(Saudi Arabia) Al Qadsiah	2025
1	(Brazil) Gabriel Carvalho	(Saudi Arabia) Al Qadsiah	2025
1	(Spain) Isaac Romero	(Spain) Sevilla	2026
1	(England) Ross Barkley	(England) Aston Villa	2026
1	(Argentina) Alejandro Garnacho	(England) Aston Villa	2026
1	(England) Max Jenner	(England) Aston Villa	2026
