= 2024–25 Sevilla FC season =

Sevilla FC
2024–25 season
- President: José María del Nido Carrasco
- Head coach: García Pimienta (until 13 April); Joaquín Caparrós (from 13 April)
- Stadium: Ramón Sánchez Pizjuán
- La Liga: 17th
- Copa del Rey: Round of 32
- Top goalscorer: League: Dodi Lukébakio (11); All: Dodi Lukébakio (11)
- Average home league attendance: 35,574
- Biggest win: Valladolid 0–4 Sevilla
- Biggest defeat: Barcelona 5–1 Sevilla
Home colours	Away colours	Third colours

The 2024–25 season was the 118th season in the history of Sevilla Fútbol Club, and the club's 24th consecutive season in La Liga. In addition to the domestic league, the club participated in the Copa del Rey.

== Summary ==
On 2 June 2024, Sevilla announced the signing of García Pimienta, who left Las Palmas, on a two-season contract. On 12 July, the Andalusian club signed a contract with Arsenal's Belgian player Albert Sambi Lokonga, with the right to purchase included. On 15 July, Sevilla reached an agreement to bring Atletico Madrid midfielder Saúl on loan.

On 31 July, it was announced that Nigerian striker Kelechi Iheanacho had signed on a free transfer. On 2 September, Loïc Badé extended his contract until 2029. On 24 September, Pimienta extended his contract for a third season.

== Players ==
=== First-team squad ===
As of 3 February 2025

Note: Flags indicate national team as defined under FIFA eligibility rules; some limited exceptions apply. Players may hold more than one non-FIFA nationality.

No.	Pos.	Nation	Player
1	GK	ESP	Álvaro Fernández
2	DF	ESP	José Ángel Carmona
3	DF	ESP	Adrià Pedrosa
4	DF	ESP	Kike Salas
5	FW	SUI	Rubén Vargas
6	MF	SRB	Nemanja Gudelj (captain)
7	FW	ESP	Isaac Romero
10	FW	ESP	Suso (vice-captain)
11	FW	BEL	Dodi Lukébakio
12	MF	BEL	Albert Sambi Lokonga (on loan from Arsenal)
13	GK	NOR	Ørjan Nyland
14	FW	ESP	Peque

No.	Pos.	Nation	Player
15	FW	NGR	Akor Adams
17	MF	ESP	Saúl (3rd captain; on loan from Atlético Madrid)
18	MF	FRA	Lucien Agoumé
20	MF	SUI	Djibril Sow
21	FW	NGR	Chidera Ejuke
22	DF	FRA	Loïc Badé
23	DF	BRA	Marcão
24	DF	FRA	Tanguy Nianzou
26	DF	ESP	Juanlu
27	FW	BEL	Stanis Idumbo
31	GK	ESP	Alberto Flores

=== Reserve squad ===
Note: Flags indicate national team as defined under FIFA eligibility rules; some limited exceptions apply. Players may hold more than one non-FIFA nationality.

No.	Pos.	Nation	Player
28	MF	ESP	Manu Bueno
29	DF	ESP	Darío Benavides
30	MF	ESP	Alberto Collado
33	GK	ESP	Matías Árbol
34	FW	COL	Mateo Mejía
35	DF	ESP	Ramón Martínez
37	MF	ESP	Pablo Rivera

No.	Pos.	Nation	Player
38	DF	ESP	Diego Hormigo
40	DF	ESP	Andrés Castrín
41	MF	ESP	Isra Domínguez
42	FW	ESP	Álvaro García Pascual
43	GK	ESP	Rafael Romero
44	FW	PUR	Leandro Antonetti

=== Out on loan ===
Note: Flags indicate national team as defined under FIFA eligibility rules; some limited exceptions apply. Players may hold more than one non-FIFA nationality.

No.	Pos.	Nation	Player
—	DF	ARG	Federico Gattoni (at River Plate until 30 June 2025)
—	MF	ESP	Joan Jordán (at Alavés until 30 June 2025)
—	FW	BEL	Adnan Januzaj (at Las Palmas until 30 June 2025)

No.	Pos.	Nation	Player
—	FW	NGR	Kelechi Iheanacho (at Middlesbrough until 30 June 2025)
—	FW	ESP	Rafa Mir (at Valencia until 30 June 2025)

== Transfers ==
=== In ===
Pos.	Player	Transferred from	Fee	Date	Source
DF	(Argentina) Gonzalo Montiel	(England) Nottingham Forest	Loan return	30 June 2024	
DF	(Spain) José Ángel Carmona	(Spain) Getafe	Loan return	30 June 2024	
DF	(Sweden) Ludwig Augustinsson	(Belgium) Anderlecht	Loan return	30 June 2024	
DF	(Argentina) Federico Gattoni	(Belgium) Anderlecht	Loan return	30 June 2024	
MF	(Denmark) Thomas Delaney	(Belgium) Anderlecht	Loan return	30 June 2024	
MF	(Spain) Óscar Rodríguez	(Spain) Getafe	Loan return	30 June 2024	
MF	(Spain) Luismi Cruz	(Spain) Tenerife	Loan return	30 June 2024	
MF	(Nigeria) Chidera Ejuke	(Russia) CSKA Moscow	Free	1 July 2024	
FW	(Spain) Peque	(Spain) Racing Santander	€4,000,000	11 July 2024	
MF	(Belgium) Albert Sambi Lokonga	(England) Arsenal	Loan	12 July 2024	
MF	(Spain) Saúl	(Spain) Atlético Madrid	Loan	15 July 2024	
FW	(Nigeria) Kelechi Iheanacho	Unattached	Free	31 July 2024	
MF	(France) Lucien Agoumé	(Italy) Inter Milan	€5,000,000	6 August 2024	
GK	(Spain) Álvaro Fernández	Unattached	Free	13 August 2024	
DF	(Argentina) Valentín Barco	(England) Brighton & Hove Albion	Loan	23 August 2024	
FW	(Switzerland) Rubén Vargas	(Germany) FC Augsburg	€2,500,000	9 January 2025	
FW	(Nigeria) Akor Adams	(France) Montpellier	€5,500,000	27 January 2025	

=== Out ===
Pos.	Player	Transferred to	Fee	Date	Source
MF	(France) Lucien Agoumé	(Italy) Inter Milan	End of loan	30 June 2024	
MF	(Tunisia) Hannibal Mejbri	(England) Manchester United	End of loan	30 June 2024	
MF	(France) Boubakary Soumaré	(England) Leicester City	End of loan	30 June 2024	
FW	(Argentina) Alejo Véliz	(England) Tottenham Hotspur	End of loan	30 June 2024	
MF	(Spain) Óliver Torres	(Mexico) Monterrey	End of contract	1 July 2024	
FW	(Argentina) Erik Lamela	(Greece) AEK Athens	End of contract	1 July 2024	
DF	(Spain) Sergio Ramos	Free agent	End of contract	1 July 2024	
FW	(Dominican Republic) Mariano	Free agent	End of contract	1 July 2024	
DF	(Argentina) Federico Gattoni	(Argentina) River Plate	Loan	3 July 2024	
FW	(Spain) Rafa Mir	(Spain) Valencia	Loan	11 July 2024	
MF	(Denmark) Thomas Delaney	(Denmark) Copenhagen	Contract terminated	19 July 2024	
MF	(Belgium) Adnan Januzaj	(Spain) Las Palmas	Loan	24 July 2024	
FW	(Morocco) Youssef En-Nesyri	(Turkey) Fenerbahçe	€19,500,000	24 July 2024	
DF	(Sweden) Ludwig Augustinsson	(Belgium) Anderlecht	Undisclosed	6 August 2024	
MF	(Spain) Óscar Rodríguez	(Spain) Leganés	Free	11 August 2024	
GK	(Serbia) Marko Dmitrović	(Spain) Leganés	Free	11 August 2024	
DF	(Argentina) Marcos Acuña	(Argentina) River Plate	€1,000,000	20 August 2024	
MF	(Spain) Joan Jordán	(Spain) Alavés	Loan	29 August 2024	
FW	(Argentina) Lucas Ocampos	(Mexico) Monterrey	€7,250,000	3 September 2024	
MF	(Spain) Jesús Navas	Retired	End of contract	31 December 2024	
DF	(Argentina) Gonzalo Montiel	(Argentina) River Plate	€4,500,000	13 January 2025	
MF	(Spain) Pedro Ortiz	(Spain) Córdoba	Free	31 January 2025	
DF	(Argentina) Valentín Barco	(England) Brighton & Hove Albion	Loan terminated	2 February 2025	
FW	(Nigeria) Kelechi Iheanacho	(England) Middlesbrough	Loan	3 February 2025	

== Friendlies ==
15 July 2024 Friendly	Sevilla	0–2	Orlando Pirates	Seville
21:00 CEST (UTC+2)	Sow (yellow card) 86'	Report	Timm (yellow card) 19', (goal) 21'; Dlamini 82'	Stadium: Estadio Jesús Navas; Referee: José Antonio Palomares (Spain)

23 July 2024 Friendly	Sporting CP	2–1	Sevilla	Faro/Loulé, Portugal
20:30 WEST (UTC+1)	Ribeiro 14'; Trincão 46'; Diomande (red card) 83'	Report	Sow (yellow card) 5'; Ocampos (yellow card) 33'; Martínez (yellow card) 79', (goal) 85'; Collado (yellow card) 83'	Stadium: Estádio Algarve; Referee: Fábio Veríssimo (Portugal)

26 July 2024 Antonio Puerta Trophy	Sevilla	1–0	Al-Ittihad	Seville
22:00 CEST (UTC+2)	Salas (yellow card) 17'; Ocampos 42' (pen.)	Report	Benzema (penalty missed) 18'; Luiz Felipe (yellow card) 24'; Al-Nashri (yellow card) 34'; Al-Shehri (yellow card) 90+1'; Hawsawi (yellow card) 90+2'; Al-Shamrani (yellow card) 90+6'	Stadium: Ramón Sánchez Pizjuán; Attendance: 21,475; Referee: Alejandro Quintero González

31 July 2024 Friendly	Sevilla	2–0	Granada	Seville
20:30 CEST (UTC+2)	Sow 22'; Saúl 49'	Report		Stadium: Estadio Jesús Navas; Attendance: 0
Note: Behind closed doors

5 August 2024 Friendly	Fulham	1–2	Sevilla	Faro/Loulé, Portugal
20:00 WEST (UTC+1)	Smith Rowe 52'	Report	Romero 2', 45'	Stadium: Estádio Algarve; Referee: Hugo Silva (Portugal)

11 August 2024 Friendly	Liverpool	4–1	Sevilla	Liverpool, England
12:30 BST (UTC+1)	Jota 30'; Díaz 39', 45+1'; Nyoni 67'	Report	Benavides (yellow card) 42'; Peque 66'	Stadium: Anfield; Attendance: 59,122; Referee: Robert Jones (England)

Friendly	Hokkaido Consadole Sapporo	Cancelled	Sevilla	Japan

Friendly	Sagan Tosu	Cancelled	Sevilla	Japan

27 May 2025 Friendly	Wydad AC	0–1	Sevilla	Casablanca, Morocco
20:00 CET (UTC+1)	Malsa (yellow card) 24'	Report	Agoumé (yellow card) 25'; Peque 50'; Pedrosa (yellow card) 90+3'	Stadium: Mohammed V Stadium

== Competitions ==
=== Overall record ===
Competition	First match	Last match	Starting round	Final position	Record							
Competition	First match	Last match	Starting round	Final position	Pld	W	D	L	GF	GA	GD	Win %
La Liga	16 August 2024	25 May 2025	Matchday 1	17th	38	10	11	17	42	55	−13	26.32
Copa del Rey	30 October 2024	4 January 2025	First round	Round of 32	3	2	0	1	7	5	+2	66.67
Total					41	12	11	18	49	60	−11	29.27

Source: Soccerway

=== La Liga ===
==== League table ====
Pos	Team	Pld	W	D	L	GF	GA	GD	Pts	Qualification or relegation
15	Alavés	38	10	12	16	38	48	−10	42 (Note: Head-to-head points: Getafe 9, Espanyol 9, Alavés 0.)	
16	Girona	38	11	8	19	44	60	−16	41 (Note: Girona finished ahead of Sevilla on head-to-head goal difference: Sevilla 0–2 Girona, Girona 1–2 Sevilla.)	
17	Sevilla	38	10	11	17	42	55	−13	41	
18	Leganés (R)	38	9	13	16	39	56	−17	40	Relegation to Segunda División
19	Las Palmas (R)	38	8	8	22	40	61	−21	32	Relegation to Segunda División

Source: LaLiga EA Sports
Rules for classification: 1) Points; 2) Head-to-head points; 3) Head-to-head goal difference; 4) Goal difference; 5) Goals scored; 6) Fair-play points
(Note: Head-to-head record is used only after all the matches between the teams in question have been played)
(R) Relegated

==== Results summary ====
Overall								Home						Away					
Pld	W	D	L	GF	GA	GD	Pts	W	D	L	GF	GA	GD	W	D	L	GF	GA	GD
38	10	11	17	42	55	−13	41	6	6	7	17	23	−6	4	5	10	25	32	−7

Source: La Liga

==== Results by round ====
Round	1	2	3	4	5	6	7	8	9	10	11	12	13	14	15	16	17	18	19	20	21	22	23	24	25	26	27	28	29	30	31	32	33	34	35	36	37	38
Ground	A	H	A	H	H	A	H	A	H	A	A	H	A	H	H	A	H	A	H	A	H	A	H	A	H	A	A	H	A	H	A	H	A	H	A	H	H	A
Result	D	L	D	L	W	L	W	D	W	L	W	L	L	W	D	L	W	L	D	W	D	D	L	W	D	D	W	L	L	L	L	D	L	D	L	W	L	L
Position	6	13	17	19	14	15	13	13	12	13	10	13	13	12	11	13	11	14	13	11	12	12	13	12	11	12	10	10	11	12	14	15	15	16	16	14	16	17

Source: La Liga
A = Away; H = Home; W = Win; D = Draw; L = Loss

==== Matches ====
The league schedule was released on 18 June 2024.

16 August 2024 1	Las Palmas	2–2	Sevilla	Las Palmas
20:30 WEST (UTC+1)	Nianzou 42' (o.g.); Sandro 71'; Viti (yellow card) 81'; Mármol (yellow card) 90+6'	Report	Suárez 25' (o.g.); Juanlu (yellow card) 34', (goal) 61'; Pedrosa (yellow card) 80'	Stadium: Estadio Gran Canaria; Attendance: 24,843; Referee: Francisco José Hernández Maeso

23 August 2024 2	Sevilla	1–2	Villarreal	Seville
21:30 CEST (UTC+2)	Romero (yellow card) 45+2'; Lukébakio 45+6'; Carmona (yellow card) 81'; Marcão (yellow card) 90+6'	Report	Danjuma 2', (yellow card) 63'; Baena (yellow card) 45+1'; Bailly (yellow card) 84'; Parejo (yellow card) 88'; Pérez 90+5', (yellow card) 90+9'	Stadium: Ramón Sánchez Pizjuán; Attendance: 34,004; Referee: Isidro Díaz de Mera Escuderos

27 August 2024 3	Mallorca	0–0	Sevilla	Palma
19:00 CEST (UTC+2)		Report	Sow (yellow card) 88'; Saúl (red card) 89'	Stadium: Estadi Mallorca Son Moix; Attendance: 20,470; Referee: Alejandro Muñiz Ruiz

1 September 2024 4	Sevilla	0–2	Girona	Seville
19:00 CEST (UTC+2)	Sambi Lokonga (yellow card) 47'; Badé (yellow card) 67'; Romero (yellow card) 90+4'	Report	Martín 41'; Asprilla (yellow card) 63'; Ruiz 73' (pen.); Francés (yellow card) 76'	Stadium: Ramón Sánchez Pizjuán; Attendance: 35,735; Referee: José María Sánchez Martínez

14 September 2024 5	Sevilla	1–0	Getafe	Seville
18:30 CEST (UTC+2)	Navas 23'; Romero (yellow card) 56'; Juanlu (yellow card) 83' (yellow-red card) 87'	Report	Yıldırım (yellow card) 45+1'; Djené (yellow card) 63'; Santiago (yellow card) 90'; Sola (yellow card) 90+9'	Stadium: Ramón Sánchez Pizjuán; Attendance: 32,643; Referee: Mateo Busquets Ferrer

20 September 2024 6	Alavés	2–1	Sevilla	Vitoria-Gasteiz
21:00 CEST (UTC+2)	Vicente 17'; Martín 60'; Guridi (yellow card) 87'	Report	Saúl (yellow card) 33'; Pedrosa (yellow card) 45+1'; Badé (yellow card) 75'; Lukébakio 83'; Salas (yellow card) 90+5'	Stadium: Mendizorrotza; Attendance: 16,538; Referee: Javier Alberola Rojas

24 September 2024 7	Sevilla	2–1	Valladolid	Seville
19:00 CEST (UTC+2)	Gudelj (yellow card) 21'; Torres 45' (o.g.); Lukébakio (yellow card) 66'; Marcão (yellow card) 78' (yellow-red card) 90'; Ejuke 85'; Peque (yellow card) 90+1'	Report	Marcos André (yellow card) 33'; Rosa (yellow card) 37'; Pérez 56'; Jurić (yellow card) 82'; Torres (yellow card) 90+5'	Stadium: Ramón Sánchez Pizjuán; Attendance: 35,292; Referee: Juan Luis Pulido Santana

29 September 2024 8	Athletic Bilbao	1–1	Sevilla	Bilbao
16:15 CEST (UTC+2)	Jauregizar 36'; Agirrezabala (red card) 82'	Report	Carmona (yellow card) 55'; Padilla 90+3' (o.g.); Nianzou (yellow card) 90+6'; Pedrosa (yellow card) 90+7'	Stadium: San Mamés; Attendance: 48,288; Referee: César Soto Grado

6 October 2024 9	Sevilla	1–0	Real Betis	Seville
18:30 CEST (UTC+2)	Lukébakio 50' (pen.); Gudelj (yellow card) 54'; Nianzou (yellow card) 76' (yellow-red card) 90'; Nyland (yellow card) 78'; Carmona (yellow card) 81'; Agoumé (yellow card) 84'	Report	Ezzalzouli (yellow card) 20'; Natan (yellow card) 52'; Ávila (yellow card) 83'	Stadium: Ramón Sánchez Pizjuán; Attendance: 42,571; Referee: Juan Martínez Munuera

20 October 2024 10	Barcelona	5–1	Sevilla	Barcelona
21:00 CEST (UTC+2)	Lewandowski 24' (pen.), 39'; Pedri 28'; Fati (yellow card) 74'; Torre 82', 88'	Report	Pedrosa (yellow card) 45+4'; Sow (yellow card) 85'; Idumbo 87'	Stadium: Estadi Olímpic Lluís Companys; Attendance: 47,848; Referee: Ricardo de Burgos Bengoetxea

25 October 2024 11	Espanyol	0–2	Sevilla	Cornellà de Llobregat
21:00 CEST (UTC+2)	Roca (yellow card) 82'; Lozano (yellow card) 90+1'	Report	Lukébakio 20', 45'	Stadium: Stage Front Stadium; Attendance: 23,656; Referee: Miguel Ángel Ortiz Arias

3 November 2024 12	Sevilla	0–2	Real Sociedad	Seville
18:30 CET (UTC+1)	Romero (yellow card) 11'; Marcão (yellow card) 66'	Report	Kubo 34'; Oyarzabal 68' (pen.); Gómez (yellow card) 75'	Stadium: Ramón Sánchez Pizjuán; Attendance: 37,619; Referee: Alejandro Muñiz Ruiz

9 November 2024 13	Leganés	1–0	Sevilla	Leganés
21:00 CET (UTC+1)	González (yellow card) 41'; Cissé (yellow card) 69'; De la Fuente 82' (pen.)	Report	Agoumé (red card) 80'; Gudelj (yellow card) 87'	Stadium: Estadio Municipal de Butarque; Attendance: 11,167; Referee: Juan Luis Pulido Santana

24 November 2024 14	Sevilla	1–0	Rayo Vallecano	Seville
16:15 CET (UTC+1)	Sow 27'; Badé (yellow card) 40'; Salas (yellow card) 46'	Report	De Frutos (yellow card) 9'; Lejeune (yellow card) 20'; Valentín (yellow card) 31'; García (yellow card) 37'; López (red card) 45+1'; Batalla (yellow card) 90+2'	Stadium: Ramón Sánchez Pizjuán; Attendance: 35,125; Referee: Mateo Busquets Ferrer

2 December 2024 15	Sevilla	1–1	Osasuna	Seville
21:00 CET (UTC+1)	Sow (yellow card) 50'; Lukébakio 72'	Report	Budimir 69'; Catena (yellow card) 80'	Stadium: Ramón Sánchez Pizjuán; Attendance: 31,536; Referee: Juan Martínez Munuera

8 December 2024 16	Atlético Madrid	4–3	Sevilla	Madrid
21:00 CET (UTC+1)	De Paul 10'; Barrios (yellow card) 48'; Griezmann 62', 90+4', (yellow card) 90+5'; Alvarez (yellow card) 72'; Lino 79'; Galán (yellow card) 87'	Report	Lukébakio 12'; Romero 32'; Agoumé (yellow card) 49'; Juanlu 57'; Fernández (yellow card) 67'; Saúl (yellow card) 76'	Stadium: Riyadh Air Metropolitano; Attendance: 60,065; Referee: Javier Alberola Rojas

14 December 2024 17	Sevilla	1–0	Celta Vigo	Seville
18:30 CET (UTC+1)	Agoumé (yellow card) 45'; Bueno 65'; Montiel (yellow card) 83'; Badé (yellow card) 90+3'; Fernández (yellow card) 90+3'; Marcão (yellow card) 90+4'; Benavides (yellow card) 90+5'; Pascual (yellow card) 90+6'	Report	Durán (yellow card) 48'; Starfelt (yellow card) 89'; Alonso (yellow card) 90+3'	Stadium: Ramón Sánchez Pizjuán; Attendance: 37,295; Referee: Jesús Gil Manzano

22 December 2024 18	Real Madrid	4–2	Sevilla	Madrid
16:15 CET (UTC+1)	Mbappé 10'; Valverde 20', (yellow card) 78'; Rodrygo 34'; Brahim 53'	Report	Sambi Lokonga (yellow card) 12'; Romero 35'; Salas (yellow card) 76'; Lukébakio 85'	Stadium: Santiago Bernabéu; Attendance: 75,227; Referee: Isidro Díaz de Mera Escuderos

11 January 2025 19	Sevilla	1–1	Valencia	Seville
21:00 CET (UTC+1)	Sow (yellow card) 70'; Pedrosa 90+3'	Report	Foulquier (yellow card) 34'; Rioja 61'; Sadiq (yellow card) 75'	Stadium: Ramón Sánchez Pizjuán; Attendance: 34,297; Referee: Francisco José Hernández Maeso

18 January 2025 20	Girona	1–2	Sevilla	Girona
14:00 CET (UTC+1)	Martínez 36'	Report	Romero (penalty missed) 3', (yellow card) 65'; Pedrosa (yellow card) 55'; Saúl 59', (yellow card) 90+3'; Carmona (yellow card) 76'; Lukébakio 88'	Stadium: Montilivi; Attendance: 12,040; Referee: Juan Martínez Munuera

25 January 2025 21	Sevilla	1–1	Espanyol	Seville
18:30 CET (UTC+1)	Badé 61'; Juanlu (yellow card) 65'	Report	Kumbulla 15'; Fernández (yellow card) 45+5'; Tejero (yellow card) 48'; Lozano (yellow card) 56'; Expósito (yellow card) 79'	Stadium: Ramón Sánchez Pizjuán; Attendance: 33,602; Referee: Adrián Cordero Vega

1 February 2025 22	Getafe	0–0	Sevilla	Getafe
14:00 CET (UTC+1)	Coba (yellow card) 25'; Berrocal (yellow card) 37'; Djené (yellow card) 38'; Iglesias (yellow card) 56'	Report	Romero (yellow card) 19'; Saúl (yellow card) 24'; Lukébakio (yellow card) 50'; Sambi Lokonga (yellow card) 54'; Carmona (yellow card) 90+1'; Gudelj (yellow card) 90+7'	Stadium: Coliseum; Attendance: 11,730; Referee: Ricardo de Burgos Bengoetxea

9 February 2025 23	Sevilla	1–4	Barcelona	Seville
21:00 CET (UTC+1)	Vargas 8'; Saúl (yellow card) 16'; Romero (yellow card) 45+4'; Badé (yellow card) 67'; Marcão (yellow card) 88'; Suso (yellow card) 90+5'	Report	Lewandowski 7'; Gavi (yellow card) 38'; López 46', (red card) 62'; Raphinha 55'; García (yellow card) 80', (goal) 89'	Stadium: Ramón Sánchez Pizjuán; Attendance: 38,592; Referee: Alejandro Hernández Hernández

16 February 2025 24	Valladolid	0–4	Sevilla	Valladolid
16:15 CET (UTC+1)	Nikitscher (yellow card) 51'; Anuar (yellow card) 72'; Amallah (yellow card) 81'; Sylla (yellow card) 90+1'	Report	Juanlu 5', 67'; Romero 45+1', (yellow card) 45+2'; Pedrosa (yellow card) 52'; Lukébakio 84'	Stadium: José Zorrilla; Attendance: 22,123; Referee: Javier Alberola Rojas

24 February 2025 25	Sevilla	1–1	Mallorca	Seville
21:00 CET (UTC+1)	Salas 45+2'; Carmona (yellow card) 90'	Report	Darder (yellow card) 44'; Mojica (yellow card) 60'; Raíllo (yellow card) 71'; Valjent 90+1'	Stadium: Ramón Sánchez Pizjuán; Attendance: 35,424; Referee: Alejandro Muñiz Ruiz

1 March 2025 26	Rayo Vallecano	1–1	Sevilla	Madrid
16:15 CET (UTC+1)	Rațiu 55'; Gumbau (yellow card) 87'	Report	Lukébakio 81'	Stadium: Vallecas; Attendance: 11,947; Referee: Pablo González Fuertes

9 March 2025 27	Real Sociedad	0–1	Sevilla	San Sebastián
20:00 CET (UTC+1)	Marín (yellow card) 80'; Traoré (yellow card) 90+5'	Report	Ejuke 46'; Sambi Lokonga (yellow card) 90+1'	Stadium: Reale Arena; Attendance: 25,478; Referee: Víctor García Verdura

16 March 2025 28	Sevilla	0–1	Athletic Bilbao	Seville
16:15 CET (UTC+1)	Nyland (yellow card) 10'; Sow (yellow card) 19'; Saúl (yellow card) 23'; Agoumé (yellow card) 84'	Report	Vesga (penalty missed) 45+3'; Berenguer (yellow card) 59'; Nuñez (yellow card) 65'; Yeray 84'	Stadium: Ramón Sánchez Pizjuán; Attendance: 37,016; Referee: Juan Luis Pulido Santana

30 March 2025 29	Real Betis	2–1	Sevilla	Seville
21:00 CEST (UTC+2)	Cardoso 25'; Adrián (yellow card) 36'; Hernández 45+3'; Isco (yellow card) 56'; Lo Celso (yellow card) 90+1'	Report	Vargas 17'; Carmona (yellow card) 36'; Badé (yellow card) 86'; Saúl (yellow card) 90+5'	Stadium: Benito Villamarín; Attendance: 58,538; Referee: Mateo Busquets Ferrer

6 April 2025 30	Sevilla	1–2	Atlético Madrid	Seville
16:15 CEST (UTC+2)	Agoumé 7'; Salas (yellow card) 90+6'	Report	Alvarez 25' (pen.); Simeone (yellow card) 51'; Lenglet (yellow card) 57'; Le Normand (yellow card) 85'; Barrios 90+3'; Sørloth (yellow card) 90+6'	Stadium: Ramón Sánchez Pizjuán; Attendance: 34,505; Referee: César Soto Grado

11 April 2025 31	Valencia	1–0	Sevilla	Valencia
21:00 CEST (UTC+2)	Guerra 45+4', (yellow card) 46'; Foulquier (yellow card) 79'; Gayà (yellow card) 81'	Report	Salas (yellow card) 72'; Carmona (yellow card) 73'	Stadium: Mestalla; Attendance: 45,618; Referee: José María Sánchez Martínez

20 April 2025 32	Sevilla	1–1	Alavés	Seville
18:30 CEST (UTC+2)	Gudelj (yellow card) 10'; Peque 12'; Suso (yellow card) 90+4'	Report	Guridi (yellow card) 42'; Kike 45+2'; Diarra (yellow card) 86'	Stadium: Ramón Sánchez Pizjuán; Attendance: 36,436; Referee: Miguel Ángel Ortiz Arias

24 April 2025 33	Osasuna	1–0	Sevilla	Pamplona
19:00 CEST (UTC+2)	Ru. García 25'; Catena (yellow card) 34'; Ibáñez (yellow card) 45+2'; Zaragoza (yellow card) 78'; Areso (yellow card) 90+1'	Report	Lukébakio (red card) 32'; Carmona (yellow card) 64'; Juanlu (yellow card) 87'	Stadium: El Sadar; Attendance: 20,555; Referee: Adrián Cordero Vega
Note: Lukébakio's red card was later rescinded following an appeal by Sevilla.

4 May 2025 34	Sevilla	2–2	Leganés	Seville
16:15 CEST (UTC+2)	Lukébakio (yellow card) 6'; Salas 21'; Carmona (yellow card) 28'; Romero 70', (yellow card) 76'; Pedrosa (yellow card) 89'	Report	Munir 7'; Brašanac (yellow card) 34'; Tapia (yellow card) 62'; Hernández 73', (yellow card) 75'; Diomande (yellow card) 80'; Neyou (yellow card) 83'	Stadium: Ramón Sánchez Pizjuán; Attendance: 35,495; Referee: Alejandro Hernández Hernández

10 May 2025 35	Celta Vigo	3–2	Sevilla	Vigo
16:15 CEST (UTC+2)	Moriba 19'; Alonso (red card) 45+6'; Mingueza 65'; Iglesias 90+1'	Report	Gudelj 45+8' (pen.); Romero (yellow card) 74'; Salas (yellow card) 90+4', (goal) 90+8'	Stadium: Balaídos; Attendance: 20,281; Referee: Pablo González Fuertes

13 May 2025 36	Sevilla	1–0	Las Palmas	Seville
21:30 CEST (UTC+2)	Agoumé (yellow card) 7'; Pascual 52'; Suso (yellow card) 55'; Juanlu (yellow card) 56'; Saúl (yellow card) 76'; Gudelj (yellow card) 90+5'; Badé (yellow card) 90+12'	Report	Mármol (yellow card) 24'; J. Muñoz (yellow card) 83'; Campaña (yellow card) 86'; Cardona (yellow card) 87'; Mata (yellow card) 90+4'; McBurnie (yellow card) 90+5'	Stadium: Ramón Sánchez Pizjuán; Attendance: 37,078; Referee: Juan Martínez Munuera

18 May 2025 37	Sevilla	0–2	Real Madrid	Seville
19:00 CEST (UTC+2)	Badé (red card) 12'; Romero (red card) 48'	Report	Bellingham (yellow card) 66', (goal) 87'; Mbappé 75'	Stadium: Ramón Sánchez Pizjuán; Attendance: 31,633; Referee: Mateo Busquets Ferrer

25 May 2025 38	Villarreal	4–2	Sevilla	Villarreal
16:15 CEST (UTC+2)	Pino 4'; Gueye 8', 53'; Baena 39'	Report	Sow 29'; Carmona (yellow card) 43'; Martínez 85'	Stadium: Estadio de la Cerámica; Attendance: 17,758; Referee: Javier Alberola Rojas

=== Copa del Rey ===
30 October 2024 First round	La Rozas	0–3	Sevilla	Las Rozas
19:00 CET (UTC+1)	Escolano (yellow card) 76'	Report	Méndez 40' (o.g.); Iheanacho 61', 79'; Ortiz (yellow card) 81'	Stadium: Navalcarbón; Attendance: 968; Referee: Pablo González Fuertes

5 December 2024 Second round	Olot	1–3	Sevilla	Olot
21:00 CET (UTC+1)	Moreno (penalty missed) 18'; González (yellow card) 35'; Ayala 90+1'	Report	Montiel 22' (pen.), (yellow card) 45+1'; Marcão (yellow card) 36'; Suso (yellow card) 42'; Juanlu 48'; Barco (yellow card) 53'; Iheanacho 73'	Stadium: Municipal; Attendance: 2,300; Referee: Guillermo Cuadra Fernández

4 January 2025 Round of 32	Almería	4–1	Sevilla	Almería
17:30 CET (UTC+1)	Milovanović (yellow card) 17', (goal) 49'; Melamed (yellow card) 37'; Suárez 54', 78', 90+6' (pen.); Quintanilla (yellow card) 90+2'	Report	Romero 5'; Badé (yellow card) 65'	Stadium: UD Almería Stadium; Attendance: 15,067; Referee: Mateo Busquets Ferrer

== Statistics ==
=== Appearances and goals ===
No.	Pos	Nat	Player	Total		La Liga		Copa del Rey	
No.	Pos	Nat	Player	Apps	Goals	Apps	Goals	Apps	Goals
Goalkeepers
1	GK	(Spain) ESP	Álvaro Fernández	4	0	2+1	0	1	0
13	GK	(Norway) NOR	Ørjan Nyland	11	0	11	0	0	0
31	GK	(Spain) ESP	Alberto Flores	0	0	0	0	0	0
Defenders
3	DF	(Spain) ESP	Adrià Pedrosa	12	0	10+1	0	1	0
4	DF	(Spain) ESP	Kike Salas	9	0	4+4	0	1	0
19	DF	(Argentina) ARG	Valentín Barco	7	0	3+3	0	1	0
22	DF	(France) FRA	Loïc Badé	9	0	8+1	0	0	0
23	DF	(Brazil) BRA	Marcão	8	0	5+2	0	1	0
24	DF	(France) FRA	Tanguy Nianzou	6	0	6	0	0	0
26	DF	(Spain) ESP	Juanlu	10	1	5+4	1	1	0
32	DF	(Spain) ESP	José Ángel Carmona	13	0	13	0	0	0
35	DF	(Spain) ESP	Ramón Martínez	1	0	0+1	0	0	0
Midfielders
6	MF	(Serbia) SRB	Nemanja Gudelj	11	0	10+1	0	0	0
8	MF	(Spain) ESP	Pedro Ortiz	1	0	0	0	0+1	0
12	MF	(Belgium) BEL	Albert Sambi Lokonga	7	0	5+2	0	0	0
17	MF	(Spain) ESP	Saúl	4	0	4	0	0	0
18	MF	(France) FRA	Lucien Agoumé	13	0	8+4	0	1	0
20	MF	(Switzerland) SUI	Djibril Sow	11	0	5+5	0	1	0
27	MF	(Belgium) BEL	Stanis Idumbo	5	1	2+2	1	1	0
30	DF	(Spain) ESP	Alberto Collado	1	0	0+1	0	0	0
Forwards
5	FW	(Argentina) ARG	Lucas Ocampos	2	0	2	0	0	0
7	FW	(Spain) ESP	Isaac Romero	11	0	10+1	0	0	0
9	FW	(Nigeria) NGR	Kelechi Iheanacho	8	2	4+3	0	1	2
10	FW	(Spain) ESP	Suso	4	0	0+4	0	0	0
11	FW	(Belgium) BEL	Dodi Lukébakio	14	5	12+1	5	1	0
14	FW	(Spain) ESP	Peque	10	0	6+4	0	0	0
21	FW	(Nigeria) NGR	Chidera Ejuke	9	1	6+3	1	0	0
34	FW	(Colombia) COL	Mateo Mejía	1	0	0+1	0	0	0
41	FW	(Spain) ESP	Isra Domínguez	2	0	0+1	0	0+1	0
Players who transferred out during the season
15	DF	(Argentina) ARG	Gonzalo Montiel	9	1	1+5	0	3	1
16	DF	(Spain) ESP	Jesús Navas	16	1	3+12	1	1	0

Last updated: 9 November 2024
Source: Competitions
