= 2025–26 Sevilla FC season =

136th season in existence of Sevilla FC

Sevilla FC
2025–26 season
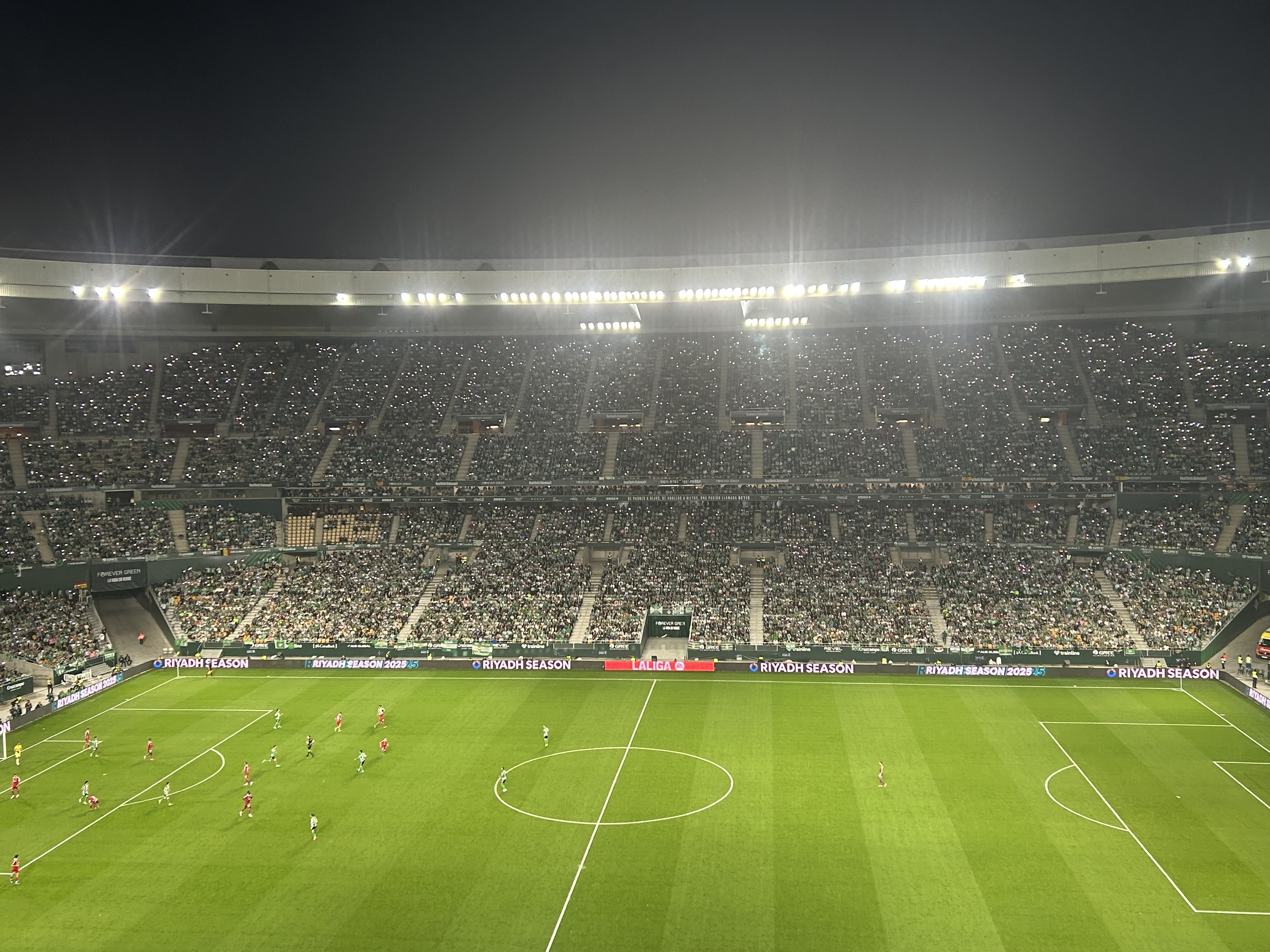
- Real Betis vs Sevilla at La Cartuja, March 2026
- President: José María del Nido Carrasco
- Head coach: Matías Almeyda (until 23 March); Luis García Plaza (from 24 March)
- Stadium: Ramón Sánchez Pizjuán
- La Liga: 13th
- Copa del Rey: Round of 32
- Top goalscorer: League: Akor Adams (10); All: Akor Adams (10)
- Highest home attendance: 42,580 (v. Real Betis, La Liga, 30 November 2025)
- Lowest home attendance: 25,303 (v. Levante, La Liga, 4 January 2026)
- Average home league attendance: 35,688
- Biggest win: 4–0 v. Oviedo (H); La Liga, 14 December 2025
- Biggest defeat: 0–3 v. Atlético Madrid (A); La Liga, 1 November 2025; 0–3 v. Levante (H); La Liga, 4 January 2026; 1–4 v. Mallorca (A); La Liga, 2 February 2026; 2–5 v. Barcelona (A); La Liga, 15 March 2026
Home colours	Away colours	Third colours

The 2025–26 season was the 119th season in the history of Sevilla Fútbol Club, and the club's 25th consecutive season in La Liga. In addition to the domestic league, the club participated in the Copa del Rey.

== Squad ==
As of 17 March 2026

No.	Player	Position	Nationality	Date of birth (age)	Signed from	Since
Goalkeepers
1	Odysseas Vlachodimos	GK	(Greece)	26 April 1994 (age 32)	(England) Newcastle United (on loan)	2025
13	Ørjan Nyland	GK	(Norway)	10 September 1990 (age 35)	(Germany) RB Leipzig	2023
31	Alberto Flores	GK	(Spain)	10 November 2003 (age 22)	(Spain) Sevilla B	2022
Defenders
2	José Ángel Carmona	RB	(Spain)	29 January 2002 (age 24)	(Spain) Sevilla B	2022
3	César Azpilicueta	RB	(Spain)	28 August 1989 (age 36)	(Spain) Atlético Madrid	2025
4	Kike Salas	CB	(Spain)	23 April 2002 (age 24)	(Spain) Sevilla B	2022
5	Tanguy Nianzou	CB	(France)	7 June 2002 (age 24)	(Germany) Bayern Munich	2022
12	Gabriel Suazo	LB	(Chile)	9 August 1997 (age 28)	(France) Toulouse	2025
15	Fábio Cardoso	CB	(Portugal)	19 April 1994 (age 32)	(Portugal) Porto	2025
16	Juanlu Sánchez	RB	(Spain)	15 August 2003 (age 22)	(Spain) Sevilla B	2021
22	Federico Gattoni	CB	(Argentina)	16 February 1999 (age 27)	(Argentina) San Lorenzo	2023
23	Marcão	CB	(Brazil)	5 June 1996 (age 30)	(Turkey) Galatasaray	2022
32	Andrés Castrín	CB	(Spain)	26 May 2003 (age 23)	(Spain) Sevilla B	2025
36	Oso	LB	(Spain)	9 July 2003 (age 22)	(Spain) Sevilla B	2025
Midfielders
6	Nemanja Gudelj (captain)	DM	(Serbia)	16 November 1991 (age 34)	(China) Guangzhou Evergrande	2019
8	Joan Jordán	CM	(Spain)	6 June 1994 (age 32)	(Spain) Eibar	2019
18	Lucien Agoumé	DM	(France)	9 February 2002 (age 24)	(Italy) Inter Milan	2024
19	Batista Mendy	DM	(France)	12 January 2000 (age 26)	(Turkey) Trabzonspor (on loan)	2025
20	Djibril Sow	DM	(Switzerland)	6 February 1997 (age 29)	(Germany) Eintracht Frankfurt	2023
24	Adnan Januzaj	RM	(Belgium)	5 February 1995 (age 31)	(Spain) Real Sociedad	2022
28	Manu Bueno	CM	(Spain)	27 July 2004 (age 21)	(Spain) Sevilla B	2023
Forwards
7	Isaac Romero	CF	(Spain)	18 May 2000 (age 26)	(Spain) Sevilla B	2024
9	Akor Adams	CF	(Nigeria)	29 January 2000 (age 26)	(France) Montpellier	2025
10	Alexis Sánchez	RW	(Chile)	19 December 1988 (age 37)	(Italy) Udinese	2025
11	Rubén Vargas	LW	(Switzerland)	5 August 1998 (age 27)	(Germany) FC Augsburg	2025
14	Peque Fernández	CF	(Spain)	4 October 2002 (age 23)	(Spain) Racing Santander	2024
17	Neal Maupay	ST	(France)	14 August 1996 (age 29)	(France) Marseille (on loan)	2026
21	Chidera Ejuke	LW	(Nigeria)	2 January 1998 (age 28)	(Russia) CSKA Moscow	2024

== Transfers ==
=== In ===
Date	Pos.	No.	Player	From	Fee	Ref.
30 June 2025	CM	8	(Spain) Joan Jordán	(Spain) Alavés	Loan return	
30 June 2025	RM	24	(Belgium) Adnan Januzaj	(Spain) Las Palmas	Loan return	
30 June 2025	CF	–	(Spain) Rafa Mir	(Spain) Valencia	Loan return	
30 June 2025	CF	–	(Nigeria) Kelechi Iheanacho	(England) Middlesbrough	Loan return	
1 July 2025	LW	17	(Spain) Alfon González	(Spain) Celta	Free transfer	
12 July 2025	LB	12	(Chile) Gabriel Suazo	(France) Toulouse	Free transfer	
29 August 2025	RB	3	(Spain) César Azpilicueta	(Spain) Atlético Madrid	Free transfer	
1 September 2025	RW	10	(Chile) Alexis Sánchez	(Italy) Udinese	Free transfer	
1 September 2025	CB	15	(Portugal) Fábio Cardoso	(Portugal) Porto	Free transfer	
31 December 2025	CB	22	(Argentina) Federico Gattoni	(Argentina) River Plate	Loan return	
▼ Spending: €0

=== Out ===
Date	Pos.	No.	Player	To	Fee	Ref.
6 June 2025	AM	10	(Spain) Suso	(Spain) Cádiz	Free transfer	
30 June 2025	CM	12	(Belgium) Albert Sambi Lokonga	(England) Arsenal	Loan return	
30 June 2025	CM	17	(Spain) Saúl	(Spain) Atlético Madrid	Loan return	
21 August 2025	CB	22	(France) Loïc Badé	(Germany) Bayer Leverkusen	€25,000,000	
30 August 2025	AM	27	(Belgium) Stanis Idumbo	(France) Monaco	€10,000,000	
1 September 2025	RW	10	(Belgium) Dodi Lukébakio	(Portugal) Benfica	€20,000,000	
2 September 2025	CF	–	(Nigeria) Kelechi Iheanacho	(Scotland) Celtic	Free transfer	
1 January 2026	GK	25	(Spain) Álvaro Fernández	(Spain) Deportivo La Coruña	Free transfer	
7 January 2026	CB	22	(Spain) Ramón Martínez	(Spain) Real Valladolid	Free transfer	
▲ Income: €55,000,000

=== Loans in ===
Date	Pos.	No.	Player	From	Date until	Ref.
12 August 2025	GK	1	(Greece) Odysseas Vlachodimos	(England) Newcastle United	End of season	
1 September 2025	DM	19	(France) Batista Mendy	(Turkey) Trabzonspor	End of season	
27 January 2026	ST	17	(France) Neal Maupay	(France) Marseille	End of season	

=== Loans out ===
Date	Pos.	No.	Player	To	Date until	Ref.
17 August 2025	CF	–	(Spain) Rafa Mir	(Spain) Elche	End of season	
1 September 2025	LB	3	(Spain) Adrià Pedrosa	(Spain) Elche	End of season	
27 January 2026	LW	17	(Spain) Alfon González	(Spain) Villarreal	End of season	

== Pre-season and friendlies ==
Win Draw Loss Fixtures

12 July 2025 Friendly	Sevilla (Spain)	1–3	(England) Birmingham City	Faro-Loulé, Portugal
20:00 WEST	Guillén 75'	Report	Anderson 10'; Klarer 26'; Leonard 88'	Stadium: Estádio Algarve

19 July 2025 Friendly	Sunderland (England)	1–1	(Spain) Sevilla	Faro-Loulé, Portugal
20:00 WEST	Le Fée 31'	Report	Vargas 90+5'	Stadium: Estádio Algarve

26 July 2025 Friendly	Schalke 04 (Germany)	2–4	(Spain) Sevilla	Gelsenkirchen, Germany
17:00 CEST	Sylla 59' (pen.); Zalazar 84'	Report	Adams 4', 32'; Iheanacho 66'; Marcão 86'	Stadium: Arena AufSchalke; Attendance: 45,774; Referee: Timo Gansloweit

10 August 2025 Friendly	Toulouse (France)	1–1	(Spain) Sevilla	Toulouse, France
18:00 CEST	Hidalgo 86'	Report	Lukébakio 36'	Stadium: Stadium de Toulouse

== Competitions ==
=== Overall record ===
Competition	First match	Last match	Starting round	Final position	Record							
Competition	First match	Last match	Starting round	Final position	Pld	W	D	L	GF	GA	GD	Win %
La Liga	17 August 2025	23 May 2026	Matchday 1	13th	38	12	7	19	46	60	−14	31.58
Copa del Rey	28 October 2025	17 December 2025	First round	Round of 32	3	2	0	1	6	3	+3	66.67
Total					41	14	7	20	52	63	−11	34.15

Source: Soccerway

=== La Liga ===
==== League table ====
Pos	Team	Pld	W	D	L	GF	GA	GD	Pts
11	Espanyol	38	12	10	16	43	55	−12	46 (Note: Tied on head-to-head points and goal difference. Real Sociedad placed ahead of Espanyol on overall goal difference.)
12	Athletic Bilbao	38	13	6	19	43	58	−15	45
13	Sevilla	38	12	7	19	46	60	−14	43 (Note: Head-to-head points: Sevilla 6, Alavés 5, Elche 3.)
14	Alavés	38	11	10	17	44	56	−12	43
15	Elche	38	10	13	15	49	57	−8	43

Source: LaLiga EA Sports
Rules for classification: 1) Points; 2) Head-to-head points; 3) Head-to-head goal difference; 4) Goal difference; 5) Goals scored; 6) Fair-play points
(Note: Head-to-head record is used only after all the matches between the teams in question have been played)

==== Results summary ====
Overall								Home						Away					
Pld	W	D	L	GF	GA	GD	Pts	W	D	L	GF	GA	GD	W	D	L	GF	GA	GD
38	12	7	19	46	60	−14	43	7	4	8	24	25	−1	5	3	11	22	35	−13

Source: Soccerway

==== Results by round ====
Round	1	2	3	4	5	6	7	8	9	10	11	12	13	14	15	16	17	18	19	20	21	22	23	24	25	26	27	28	29	30	31	32	33	34	35	36	37	38
Ground	A	H	A	H	A	H	A	H	H	A	A	H	A	H	A	H	A	H	H	A	H	A	H	H	A	A	H	A	H	A	H	A	A	H	H	A	H	A
Result	L	L	W	D	W	L	W	W	L	L	L	W	L	L	D	W	L	L	L	D	W	L	D	D	W	D	D	L	L	L	W	L	L	W	W	W	L	L
Position	13	17	12	12	9	12	9	6	9	11	13	9	11	13	13	9	10	11	14	14	12	15	13	14	13	13	14	15	15	17	16	18	18	17	13	12	13	13
Points	0	0	3	4	7	7	10	13	13	13	13	16	16	16	17	20	20	20	20	21	24	24	25	26	29	30	31	31	31	31	34	34	34	37	40	43	43	43

Source: La Liga
A = Away; H = Home; W = Win; D = Draw; L = Loss; P = Postponed

==== Matches ====
The league fixtures were released on 1 July 2025.

Win Draw Loss Fixtures

17 August 2025 1	Athletic Bilbao	3–2	Sevilla	Bilbao
19:30 CEST (UTC+2)	N. Williams 36' (pen.); Sannadi 43'; Navarro 81'	Report	Castrín (yellow card) 6'; Lukébakio 60'; Agoumé (yellow card) 37', (goal) 72'	Stadium: San Mamés; Attendance: 49,134; Referee: Francisco José Hernández Maeso

25 August 2025 2	Sevilla	1–2	Getafe	Seville
21:30 CEST (UTC+2)	Iglesias 45' (o.g.); Carmona (yellow card) 57'; Peque (yellow card) 72'	Report	Liso 15', 51'; Arambarri (yellow card) 66'; Martín (yellow card) 74'	Stadium: Ramón Sánchez-Pizjuán; Attendance: 36,697; Referee: Isidro Díaz de Mera Escuderos

30 August 2025 3	Girona	0–2	Sevilla	Girona
19:30 CEST (UTC+2)		Report	Alfon 30'; Romero 55'; Agoumé (yellow card) 78'; Nyland (yellow card) 90+2'	Stadium: Montilivi; Attendance: 11,305; Referee: Miguel Ángel Ortiz Arias

12 September 2025 4	Sevilla	2–2	Elche	Seville
21:00 CEST (UTC+2)	Agoumé (yellow card) 8'; Nianzou (yellow card) 52'; Romero 28', (yellow card) 44'; Peque 85'; Azpilicueta (yellow card) 90+3'	Report	Chust (yellow card) 44'; Silva 54'; Mir 70'; Pedrosa (yellow card) 83'; John (yellow card) 90+4'	Stadium: Ramón Sánchez-Pizjuán; Attendance: 37,331; Referee: Javier Alberola Rojas

20 September 2025 5	Alavés	1–2	Sevilla	Vitoria-Gasteiz
18:30 CEST (UTC+2)	Vicente 17' (pen.); Blanco (yellow card) 89'	Report	Vargas 10', (yellow card) 39'; Nianzou (yellow card) 44'; Sánchez 67'; Mendy (yellow card) 77'; Suazo (yellow card) 84'; Vlachodimos (yellow card) 85'; Peque (yellow card) 90+5'; Azpilicueta (yellow card) 90+7'	Stadium: Mendizorrotza; Attendance: 17,525; Referee: Iosu Galech Apezteguía

23 September 2025 6	Sevilla	1–2	Villarreal	Seville
21:30 CEST (UTC+2)	Sow 51'; Gudelj (yellow card) 70'; Oso (yellow card) 90+3'	Report	Oluwaseyi 17'; Gueye (yellow card) 42'; Pedraza (yellow card) 47'; Marín (yellow card) 85'; Solomon 86'	Stadium: Ramón Sánchez-Pizjuán; Attendance: 38,145; Referee: César Soto Grado

28 September 2025 7	Rayo Vallecano	0–1	Sevilla	Madrid
14:00 CEST (UTC+2)	Lejeune (yellow card) 34'; Trejo (yellow card) 82'; Camello (red card) 90+7'	Report	Carmona (yellow card) 48'; Adams 87'; Peque (yellow card) 90+5'	Stadium: Vallecas; Attendance: 13,080; Referee: Jesús Gil Manzano

5 October 2025 8	Sevilla	4–1	Barcelona	Seville
16:15 CEST (UTC+2)	Sánchez 13' (pen.); Marcão (yellow card) 20'; Romero 37', (yellow card) 50'; Janujaz (yellow card) 74'; Agoumé (yellow card) 81'; Carmona 90'; Peque (yellow card) 90+5'; Adams 90+6', (yellow card) 90+7'; Gudelj (yellow card) 90+8'	Report	Martín (yellow card) 16'; Torres (yellow card) 21'; De Jong (yellow card) 38'; Rashford 45+7', (yellow card) 84'; Lewandowski (penalty missed) 76'; Araújo (yellow card) 90+11'	Stadium: Ramón Sánchez-Pizjuán; Attendance: 41,040; Referee: Alejandro Muñiz Ruiz

18 October 2025 9	Sevilla	1–3	Mallorca	Seville
14:00 CEST (UTC+2)	Vargas 16'; Suazo (yellow card) 59'; Carmona (yellow card) 85'	Report	Raíllo (yellow card) 55'; Muriqi 67'; Joseph 72', 77'	Stadium: Ramón Sánchez-Pizjuán; Attendance: 37,008; Referee: Víctor García Verdura

24 October 2025 10	Real Sociedad	2–1	Sevilla	San Sebastián
21:00 CEST (UTC+2)	Oyarzabal 19' (pen.), 36', (yellow card) 90+3'	Report	Gudelj 30'; Agoumé (yellow card) 34'; Sow (yellow card) 50'; Carmona (yellow card) 57'	Stadium: Anoeta; Attendance: 30,965; Referee: Adrián Cordero Vega

1 November 2025 11	Atlético Madrid	3–0	Sevilla	Madrid
16:15 CET (UTC+1)	Alvarez 64' (pen.); Almada 77'; Griezmann 90'	Report	Romero (yellow card) 54'; Nianzou (yellow card) 63'; Vlachodimos (yellow card) 77'	Stadium: Riyadh Air Metropolitano; Attendance: 66,119; Referee: Francisco José Hernández Maeso

8 November 2025 12	Sevilla	1–0	Osasuna	Seville
16:15 CET (UTC+1)	Carmona (yellow card) 20'; Sow (yellow card) 28'; Nianzou (yellow card) 45+1'; Vargas 51' (pen.); Suazo (yellow card) 83'; Mendy (yellow card) 90+2'	Report	V. Muñoz (yellow card) 21'; Moncayola (yellow card) 61'; I. Muñoz (yellow card) 90+3'	Stadium: Ramón Sánchez-Pizjuán; Attendance: 35,169; Referee: Miguel Ángel Ortiz Arias

24 November 2025 13	Espanyol	2–1	Sevilla	Cornellà de Llobregat
21:00 CET (UTC+1)	Milla 48', (yellow card) 71'; Expósito (yellow card) 50'; Roberto 84', (yellow card) 85'; Lozano (yellow card) 90+7'	Report	Marcão 86'; Castrín (yellow card) 90+4'	Stadium: RCDE Stadium; Attendance: 25,166; Referee: Miguel Sesma Espinosa

30 November 2025 14	Sevilla	0–2	Real Betis	Seville
16:15 CET (UTC+1)	Carmona (yellow card) 75'; Romero (red card) 84'; Marcão (yellow card) 86'	Report	Bartra (yellow card) 42'; Ruibal (yellow card) 52'; Fornals 54'; Altimira 68'; Ávila (yellow card) 90+4'	Stadium: Ramón Sánchez-Pizjuán; Attendance: 42,580; Referee: José Luis Munuera Montero

7 December 2025 15	Valencia	1–1	Sevilla	Valencia
16:15 CET (UTC+1)	Copete (yellow card) 74'; Correia (yellow card) 87'; Duro 90+3'; Tárrega (yellow card) 90+7'	Report	Peque (yellow card) 23'; Tárrega 58' (o.g.); Azpilicueta (yellow card) 75'; Gudelj (yellow card) 76'; Agoumé (yellow card) 82'; Castrín (yellow card) 88'; Carmona (yellow card) 90+5'	Stadium: Mestalla; Attendance: 44,369; Referee: Guillermo Cuadra Fernández

14 December 2025 16	Sevilla	4–0	Oviedo	Seville
14:00 CET (UTC+1)	Adams 4'; Sow 22'; Mendy 51'; Agoumé (yellow card) 59'; Ejuke 89'	Report	Carmo (red card)	Stadium: Ramón Sánchez-Pizjuán; Attendance: 32,885; Referee: Isidro Díaz de Mera Escuderos

20 December 2025 17	Real Madrid	2–0	Sevilla	Madrid
21:00 CET (UTC+1)	Bellingham 38'; Rodrygo (yellow card) 41'; Asencio (yellow card) 60'; Mbappé 86' (pen.)	Report	Carmona (yellow card) 34'; Marcão (yellow card) 37' (yellow-red card) 68'; Agoumé (yellow card) 70'; Sow (yellow card) 90+1'	Stadium: Bernabéu; Attendance: 72,062; Referee: Alejandro Muñiz Ruiz

4 January 2026 18	Sevilla	0–3	Levante	Seville
14:00 CET (UTC+1)	Sánchez (yellow card) 14'; Mendy (yellow card) 37'; Gudelj (yellow card) 84'; Romero (penalty missed) 90+2'	Report	Moreno (yellow card) 28'; Losada 45+2'; Pampín (yellow card) 63'; Ryan (yellow card) 74'; Espí 77'; Toljan (yellow card) 90+1'; Álvarez 90+4'	Stadium: Ramón Sánchez-Pizjuán; Attendance: 25,303; Referee: Iosu Galech Apezteguía

12 January 2026 19	Sevilla	0–1	Celta Vigo	Seville
21:00 CET (UTC+1)	Romero (yellow card) 61'; Juanlu (yellow card) 75'; Mendy (yellow card) 86'	Report	Moriba (yellow card) 34'; Alonso 88' (pen.); Mingueza (yellow card) 89'; Álvarez (yellow card) 90+3'	Stadium: Ramón Sánchez-Pizjuán; Attendance: 31,383; Referee: José María Sánchez Martínez

19 January 2026 20	Elche	2–2	Sevilla	Elche
21:00 CET (UTC+1)	Febas 14'; Chust (yellow card) 21'; Valera 55'; Santiago (yellow card) 80'; Diaby (yellow card) 90+4'	Report	Mendy (yellow card) 59'; Adams 75', 90+2' (pen.)	Stadium: Martínez Valero; Attendance: 22,594; Referee: Ricardo de Burgos Bengoetxea

24 January 2026 21	Sevilla	2–1	Athletic Bilbao	Seville
18:30 CET (UTC+1)	Peque 42'; Adams 56' (pen.); Gudelj (yellow card) 62'; Jordán (yellow card) 86'	Report	Ruiz de Galarreta (yellow card) 21'; Navarro 40'	Stadium: Ramón Sánchez-Pizjuán; Attendance: 34,642; Referee: Francisco José Hernández Maeso

2 February 2026 22	Mallorca	4–1	Sevilla	Palma
21:00 CET (UTC+1)	Muriqi 26' (pen.); Mascarell (yellow card) 44'; Costa 53'; Darder 74'; Torre 90+6'	Report	Maupay 45+1'; Agoumé (yellow card) 90'	Stadium: Son Moix; Attendance: 15,621; Referee: César Soto Grado

8 February 2026 23	Sevilla	1–1	Girona	Seville
16:15 CET (UTC+1)	Carmona (yellow card) 21'; Azpilicueta (yellow card) 51'; Salas 90+2'; Suazo (yellow card) 90+6'	Report	Lemar 2'; Echeverri (yellow card) 53'; Gazzaniga (yellow card) 87'; Martín (yellow card) 90+2'; Stuani (penalty missed) 90+8'	Stadium: Ramón Sánchez-Pizjuán; Attendance: 30,384; Referee: Jesús Gil Manzano

14 February 2026 24	Sevilla	1–1	Alavés	Seville
18:30 CET (UTC+1)	Juanlu (yellow card) 2' (yellow-red card) 16'; Sow 42'; Jordán (red card) 90+1'; Gudelj (yellow card) 90+1'; Peque (yellow card) 90+5'; Mendy (yellow card) 90+11'	Report	Martínez 60'	Stadium: Ramón Sánchez-Pizjuán; Attendance: 32,846; Referee: Iosu Galech Apezteguía

22 February 2026 25	Getafe	0–1	Sevilla	Getafe
14:00 CET (UTC+1)	Djené (red card) 26'; Iglesias (yellow card) 26'	Report	Nianzou (yellow card) 53'; Sow 64'	Stadium: Coliseum; Attendance: 8,814; Referee: Mateo Busquets Ferrer

1 March 2026 26	Real Betis	2–2	Sevilla	Seville
18:30 CET (UTC+1)	Antony 16', (yellow card) 24'; Fidalgo 37'; Llorente (yellow card) 75'; Natan (yellow card) 82'	Report	Suazo (yellow card) 11'; Sánchez 62'; Romero 85', (yellow card) 85'; Juanlu (yellow card) 90'	Stadium: La Cartuja; Attendance: 67,447; Referee: Ricardo de Burgos Bengoetxea

8 March 2026 27	Sevilla	1–1	Rayo Vallecano	Seville
18:30 CET (UTC+1)	Gudelj (yellow card) 2'; Adams 13'	Report	Espino 50'; Pérez (yellow card) 59'; Lejeune (yellow card) 65'; Rațiu (yellow card) 85'	Stadium: Ramón Sánchez-Pizjuán; Attendance: 37,178; Referee: Alejandro Muñiz Ruiz

15 March 2026 28	Barcelona	5–2	Sevilla	Barcelona
16:15 CET (UTC+1)	Raphinha 9' (pen.), 21' (pen.), 51'; Olmo 38'; Cancelo 60'	Report	Suazo (yellow card) 37'; Oso 45+3'; Sow 90+2'	Stadium: Camp Nou; Attendance: 56,483; Referee: Juan Martínez Munuera

21 March 2026 29	Sevilla	0–2	Valencia	Seville
21:00 CET (UTC+1)	Agoumé (yellow card) 28'; Maupay (yellow card) 90+5'	Report	Duro 38'; Ramazani 45+5'; Beltrán (yellow card) 74'	Stadium: Ramón Sánchez-Pizjuán; Attendance: 35,031; Referee: Víctor García Verdura

5 April 2026 30	Oviedo	1–0	Sevilla	Oviedo
18:30 CEST (UTC+2)	Viñas (yellow card) 13', (goal) 32'; López (yellow card) 53'; Fonseca (yellow card) 89'; Bailly (yellow card) 90'; Chaira (yellow card) 90+2'	Report	Nianzou (red card) 38'; Carmona (yellow card) 43'; Salas (yellow card) 54'; Bueno (yellow card) 69'	Stadium: Carlos Tartiere; Attendance: 24,921; Referee: Alejandro Hernández Hernández

11 April 2026 31	Sevilla	2–1	Atlético Madrid	Seville
21:00 CEST (UTC+2)	Adams 10' (pen.); Bueno (yellow card) 36'; Gudelj 45+2', (yellow card) 88'; Juanlu (yellow card) 67'; Peque (yellow card) 90+6'	Report	Boñar 35'; Díaz (yellow card) 44'; Baena (yellow card) 75'; Griezmann (yellow card) 75'; Morcillo (yellow card) 90+5'	Stadium: Ramón Sánchez-Pizjuán; Attendance: 29,723; Referee: Isidro Díaz de Mera Escuderos

23 April 2026 32	Levante	2–0	Sevilla	Valencia
19:00 CEST (UTC+2)	Rey (yellow card) 23'; Romero 38', 90+3', (yellow card) 90+1'; Raghouber (yellow card) 59'	Report	Adams (yellow card) 10'; Agoumé (yellow card) 60'; Sow (yellow card) 77'; Romero (yellow card) 88'	Stadium: Ciutat de València; Attendance: 20,210; Referee: José María Sánchez Martínez

26 April 2026 33	Osasuna	2–1	Sevilla	Pamplona
18:30 CEST (UTC+2)	Budimir (yellow card) 51'; García 80', (yellow card) 90+4'; Catena 90+9'	Report	Suazo (yellow card) 6'; Sow (yellow card) 66'; Maupay 69'	Stadium: El Sadar; Attendance: 20,541; Referee: Miguel Ángel Ortiz Arias

4 May 2026 34	Sevilla	1–0	Real Sociedad	Seville
21:00 CEST (UTC+2)	Sánchez 50', (yellow card) 75'; Carmona (yellow card) 88'	Report	Aramburu (yellow card) 28'	Stadium: Ramón Sánchez-Pizjuán; Attendance: 40,792; Referee: Juan Martínez Munuera

9 May 2026 35	Sevilla	2–1	Espanyol	Seville
16:15 CEST (UTC+2)	Carmona (yellow card) 61'; Vargas (yellow card) 73'; Sow (yellow card) 73'; Castrín 82', (yellow card) 90+9'; Adams 90+1', (yellow card) 90+2'	Report	González de Zárate (yellow card) 26'; Dolan 56', (yellow card) 73'; El Hilali (yellow card) 90+1'; Calero (yellow card) 90+9'; Pickel (yellow card) 90+11'	Stadium: Ramón Sánchez-Pizjuán; Attendance: 39,085; Referee: Javier Alberola Rojas

13 May 2026 36	Villarreal	2–3	Sevilla	Villarreal
19:00 CEST (UTC+2)	Moreno 13'; Mikautadze 20'; Pérez (yellow card) 81'; Veiga (yellow card) 90+2'	Report	Oso 36'; Salas 45+2'; Adams 72'; Carmona (yellow card) 90+3'	Stadium: La Cerámica; Attendance: 17,325; Referee: Mateo Busquets Ferrer

17 May 2026 37	Sevilla	0–1	Real Madrid	Seville
19:00 CEST (UTC+2)	Gudelj (yellow card) 48'; Sánchez (yellow card) 80'; Juanlu (yellow card) 84'; Agoumé (yellow card) 90+4'	Report	Vinícius 15'	Stadium: Ramón Sánchez-Pizjuán; Attendance: 40,844; Referee: José María Sánchez Martínez

23 May 2026 38	Celta Vigo	1–0	Sevilla	Vigo
21:00 CEST (UTC+2)	Moriba (yellow card) 38', (goal) 51'	Report	Maupay (yellow card) 90+6'	Stadium: Abanca-Balaídos; Attendance: 20,901; Referee: Francisco José Hernández Maeso

=== Copa del Rey ===
As a La Liga side not competing in the Supercopa de España, Sevilla entered the Copa del Rey in the first round.

Win Draw Loss Fixtures

28 October 2025 First round	Toledo	1–4	Sevilla	Toledo
21:00 CET (UTC+1)	Rubayo (yellow card) 13'; Brunet 17'; Nanclares (yellow card) 45'; Ghabbour (yellow card) 45+1'	Report	Oso (yellow card) 14'; Peque 23'; Januzaj 40', 48'; Salas 60'; Martínez (yellow card) 75'	Stadium: Salto del Caballo; Attendance: 6,648; Referee: Guillermo Cuadra Fernández

4 December 2025 Second round	Extremadura	1–2	Sevilla	Almendralejo
21:00 CET (UTC+1)	Zarfino 48'; Cano (yellow card) 90+5'	Report	Alfon 31'; Romero 38', (yellow card) 76'; Gudelj (yellow card) 51'	Stadium: Francisco de la Hera; Attendance: 11,264; Referee: Javier Alberola Rojas

17 December 2025 Round of 32	Alavés	1–0	Sevilla	Vitoria-Gasteiz
21:00 CET (UTC+1)	Enríquez (yellow card) 45+1'; Vicente 79' (pen.)	Report	Carmona (yellow card) 29'; Castrín (yellow card) 53'	Stadium: Mendizorrotza; Attendance: 9,766; Referee: Miguel Sesma Espinosa

== Statistics ==
=== Appearances ===
Players with no appearances are not included on the list, italics indicate a loaned in player.

No.	Pos	Nat	Player	Total		La Liga		Copa del Rey	
No.	Pos	Nat	Player	Apps	Goals	Apps	Goals	Apps	Goals
1	GK	(Greece) GRE	Odysseas Vlachodimos	34	0	33	0	1	0
2	DF	(Spain) ESP	José Ángel Carmona	38	1	29+6	1	1+2	0
3	DF	(Spain) ESP	César Azpilicueta	17	0	17	0	0	0
4	DF	(Spain) ESP	Kike Salas	28	3	24+2	2	2	1
5	DF	(France) FRA	Tanguy Nianzou	12	0	8+4	0	0	0
6	MF	(Serbia) SRB	Nemanja Gudelj	37	2	26+8	2	2+1	0
7	FW	(Spain) ESP	Isaac Romero	31	5	18+11	4	2	1
8	MF	(Spain) ESP	Joan Jordán	5	0	0+3	0	2	0
9	FW	(Nigeria) NGR	Akor Adams	33	10	21+11	10	1	0
10	FW	(Chile) CHI	Alexis Sánchez	30	4	11+17	4	1+1	0
11	FW	(Switzerland) SUI	Rubén Vargas	25	3	20+4	3	0+1	0
12	DF	(Chile) CHI	Gabriel Suazo	30	0	25+4	0	0+1	0
13	GK	(Norway) NOR	Ørjan Nyland	7	0	5	0	2	0
14	FW	(Spain) ESP	Peque Fernández	28	3	12+14	2	2	1
15	DF	(Portugal) POR	Fábio Cardoso	5	0	4	0	1	0
16	DF	(Spain) ESP	Juanlu Sánchez	35	0	23+9	0	3	0
17	FW	(France) FRA	Neal Maupay	12	2	10+2	2	0	0
18	MF	(France) FRA	Lucien Agoumé	36	1	31+3	1	1+1	0
19	MF	(France) FRA	Batista Mendy	28	1	19+8	1	0+1	0
20	MF	(Switzerland) SUI	Djibril Sow	35	5	27+6	5	1+1	0
21	FW	(Nigeria) NGR	Chidera Ejuke	29	1	6+21	1	1+1	0
22	DF	(Argentina) ARG	Federico Gattoni	1	0	0+1	0	0	0
23	DF	(Brazil) BRA	Marcão	13	1	11+2	1	0	0
24	MF	(Belgium) BEL	Adnan Januzaj	13	2	2+10	0	1	2
28	MF	(Spain) ESP	Manu Bueno	10	0	2+6	0	2	0
29	MF	(Spain) ESP	Miguel Sierra	5	0	0+4	0	0+1	0
32	DF	(Spain) ESP	Andrés Castrín	21	1	13+6	1	1+1	0
36	DF	(Spain) ESP	Oso	24	2	14+7	2	3	0
Player(s) who featured but departed the club on loan or permanently during the season:
3	DF	(Spain) ESP	Adrià Pedrosa	1	0	0+1	0	0	0
10	FW	(Belgium) BEL	Dodi Lukébakio	2	1	2	1	0	0
17	FW	(Spain) ESP	Alfon González	13	2	4+6	1	2+1	1
22	DF	(Spain) ESP	Ramón Martínez	3	0	0+2	0	1	0
27	FW	(Belgium) BEL	Stanis Idumbo	1	0	1	0	0	0

=== Goals ===
Rank	Pos.	No.	Player	La Liga	Copa del Rey	Total
1	FW	9	(Nigeria) Akor Adams	10	0	10
2	FW	7	(Spain) Isaac Romero	4	1	5
2	MF	20	(Switzerland) Djibril Sow	5	0	5
3	FW	10	(Chile) Alexis Sánchez	4	0	4
4	DF	4	(Spain) Kike Salas	2	1	3
4	FW	11	(Switzerland) Rubén Vargas	3	0	3
4	FW	14	(Spain) Peque Fernández	2	1	3
5	MF	6	(Serbia) Nemanja Gudelj	2	0	2
5	FW	17	(France) Neal Maupay	2	0	2
5	FW	17	(Spain) Alfon González	1	1	2
5	MF	24	(Belgium) Adnan Januzaj	0	2	2
5	DF	36	(Spain) Oso	2	0	2
6	DF	2	(Spain) José Ángel Carmona	1	0	1
6	FW	10	(Belgium) Dodi Lukébakio	1	0	1
6	MF	18	(France) Lucien Agoumé	1	0	1
6	MF	19	(France) Batista Mendy	1	0	1
6	FW	21	(Nigeria) Chidera Ejuke	1	0	1
6	DF	23	(Brazil) Marcão	1	0	1
6	DF	32	(Spain) Andrés Castrín	1	0	1
Total				43	6	49

=== Clean sheets ===
Rank	No.	Player	La Liga	Copa del Rey	Total
1	1	(Greece) Odysseas Vlachodimos	5	0	5
2	13	(Norway) Ørjan Nyland	1	0	1
Total			6	0	6

=== Disciplinary record ===
No.	Pos.	Player	La Liga			Copa del Rey			Total		
No.	Pos.	Player	Yellow card	(yellow card) (yellow-red card)	Red card	Yellow card	(yellow card) (yellow-red card)	Red card	Yellow card	(yellow card) (yellow-red card)	Red card
1	GK	(Greece) Odysseas Vlachodimos	2	0	0	0	0	0	2	0	0
2	DF	(Spain) José Ángel Carmona	13	0	0	1	0	0	14	0	0
3	DF	(Spain) César Azpilicueta	4	0	0	0	0	0	4	0	0
4	DF	(Spain) Kike Salas	1	0	0	0	0	0	1	0	0
5	DF	(France) Tanguy Nianzou	5	0	1	0	0	0	5	0	1
6	MF	(Serbia) Nemanja Gudelj	9	0	0	1	0	0	10	0	0
7	FW	(Spain) Isaac Romero	6	0	1	1	0	0	7	0	1
8	MF	(Spain) Joan Jordán	1	0	1	0	0	0	1	0	1
9	FW	(Nigeria) Akor Adams	3	0	0	0	0	0	3	0	0
10	FW	(Chile) Alexis Sánchez	3	0	0	0	0	0	3	0	0
11	FW	(Switzerland) Rubén Vargas	2	0	0	0	0	0	2	0	0
12	DF	(Chile) Gabriel Suazo	7	0	0	0	0	0	7	0	0
13	GK	(Norway) Ørjan Nyland	1	0	0	0	0	0	1	0	0
14	FW	(Spain) Peque Fernández	7	0	0	0	0	0	7	0	0
16	DF	(Spain) Juanlu Sánchez	4	1	0	0	0	0	4	1	0
17	FW	(France) Neal Maupay	2	0	0	0	0	0	2	0	0
18	MF	(France) Lucien Agoumé	12	0	0	0	0	0	12	0	0
19	MF	(France) Batista Mendy	6	0	0	0	0	0	6	0	0
20	MF	(Switzerland) Djibril Sow	6	0	0	0	0	0	6	0	0
22	DF	(Spain) Ramón Martínez	0	0	0	1	0	0	1	0	0
23	DF	(Brazil) Marcão	2	1	0	0	0	0	2	1	0
24	MF	(Belgium) Adnan Januzaj	1	0	0	0	0	0	1	0	0
28	MF	(Spain) Manu Bueno	2	0	0	0	0	0	2	0	0
32	DF	(Spain) Andrés Castrín	4	0	0	1	0	0	5	0	0
36	DF	(Spain) Oso	1	0	0	1	0	0	2	0	0
Total			104	2	3	6	0	0	110	2	3
