= Oso (footballer) =

Spanish footballer (born 2003)

Personal information
- Full name: Joaquín Martínez Gauna
- Date of birth: 9 July 2003 (age 23)
- Place of birth: Torrevieja, Spain
- Height: 1.83 m (6 ft 0 in)
- Positions: Left-back; left wing-back

Team information
- Current team: Strasbourg
- Number: 36

Youth career
- Algorfa
- Kelme
- Murcia
- 2018–2022: Málaga

Senior career*
Years	Team	Apps	(Gls)
2021–2022	Málaga B	6	(1)
2022–2025	Sevilla B	65	(3)
2023–2026	Sevilla	23	(3)
2026–	Strasbourg	4	(0)
- * Club domestic league appearances and goals as of 17 October 2026

Joaquín Martínez Gauna (born 9 July 2003), commonly known as Oso, is a Spanish professional footballer who as a left-back or left wing-back for Ligue 1 club Strasbourg.

== Personal life ==
Oso's younger brother Gabriel is also a footballer. A forward, both were together for a short period at Murcia and Sevilla.

== Career ==
=== Early career ===
Born in Torrevieja, Alicante, Valencian Community, to Argentine parents, Oso began his career with Algorfa CF, and subsequently represented Kelme CF and Real Murcia CF before joining Málaga CF's youth sides in 2018. He made his senior debut with the latter's reserves on 12 October 2021, playing the last 26 minutes of a 1–1 Tercera División RFEF home draw against CD Alhaurino.

Oso scored his first senior goal on 9 April 2022, netting Atlético Malagueño's winner in a 3–2 home success over UD San Pedro.

=== Sevilla ===
On 13 July 2022, Oso signed a three-year contract with Sevilla FC, being initially a member of the B-team in Segunda Federación. Converted into a left-back at Sevilla Atlético, he made his first team debut with the Andalusians on 6 December 2023, coming on as a late substitute for Manu Bueno in a 2–0 away win over Atlético Astorga FC, for the season's Copa del Rey. The following 23 February, he renewed his link until 2027.

Regularly used in the B-team afterwards, Oso made his professional – and La Liga – debut on 7 December 2025, starting in a 1–1 away draw against Valencia CF. He scored his first goal in the category the following 15 March, but in a 5–2 loss at FC Barcelona.

=== Strasbourg ===
On 30 August 2026, Oso was announced at Ligue 1 side Strasbourg on a five-year contract.

== Club statistics ==
As of match played 17 October 2026

Appearances and goals by club, season and competition
Club	Season	League			National cup (Note: Copa del Rey, Coupe de France)		Europe		Other		Total	
Club	Season	Division	Apps	Goals	Apps	Goals	Apps	Goals	Apps	Goals	Apps	Goals
Sevilla	2023–24	La Liga	0	0	1	0	0	0	0	0	1	0
Sevilla	2024–25	La Liga	0	0	0	0	—		—		0	0
Sevilla	2025–26	La Liga	21	2	3	0	—		—		26	2
Sevilla	2026–27	La Liga	2	1	0	0	—		—		2	1
Sevilla	Total		23	3	4	0	0	0	0	0	28	3
Strasbourg	2026–27	Ligue 1	5	0	0	0	—		—		5	0
Career total			28	3	4	0	0	0	0	0	33	3
