= Isra Domínguez =

Spanish footballer (born 2004)

Personal information
- Full name: Israel Domínguez Velasco
- Date of birth: 7 May 2003 (age 23)
- Place of birth: Antequera, Spain
- Height: 1.75 m (5 ft 9 in)
- Position: Winger

Team information
- Current team: Sevilla B
- Number: 23

Youth career
- 2015–2020: Antequera
- 2021–2022: Antequera

Senior career*
Years	Team	Apps	(Gls)
2020–2021	Casabermeja	21	(3)
2021–2022	Antequera	30	(9)
2023–	Sevilla B	73	(8)
2024–	Sevilla	1	(0)
- * Club domestic league appearances and goals as of 10 June 2026

Israel Domínguez Velasco (born 7 May 2003) is a Spanish professional footballer who plays mainly as a right winger for Sevilla Atlético.

== Career ==
Born in Antequera, Málaga, Andalusia, Domínguez played for hometown side Antequera CF before joining CD Casabermeja in the División de Honor Andaluza in 2020. After making his senior debut with the latter, he returned to the former on 4 August 2021, being now assigned to the main squad in Segunda División RFEF.

On 23 December 2022, Domínguez joined Sevilla FC on a two-and-a-half-year contract, after the club paid his release clause; he was initially assigned to the reserves also in the fourth division. He made his first team debut on 30 October 2024, coming on as a second-half substitute for Stanis Idumbo Muzambo in a 3–0 away win over Las Rozas CF, for the season's Copa del Rey.

Domínguez made his professional – and La Liga – debut on 3 November 2024, replacing fellow youth graduate Juanlu Sánchez in a 2–0 home loss to Real Sociedad.
