= Mateo Mejía =

Colombian footballer

Personal information
- Full name: José Mateo Mejía Piedrahita
- Date of birth: 21 March 2003 (age 23)
- Place of birth: Zaragoza, Spain
- Height: 1.81 m (5 ft 11 in)
- Positions: Winger; forward

Team information
- Current team: Panetolikos (on loan from Burgos)
- Number: 9

Youth career
- 2013–2019: Zaragoza
- 2019–2024: Manchester United

Senior career*
Years	Team	Apps	(Gls)
2024–2025	Sevilla B	47	(11)
2024–2025	Sevilla	1	(0)
2025–	Burgos	24	(3)
2026–	→ Panetolikos (loan)	4	(0)

International career
2022	Colombia U20	2	(0)
- * Club domestic league appearances and goals as of 21:26, 22 September 2026 (UTC)

José Mateo Mejía Piedrahita (born 21 March 2003) is a professional footballer who plays as a winger or forward for Super League Greece club Panetolikos, on loan from Spanish side Burgos. Born in Spain, he represents Colombia at youth level.

== Club career ==
As a youth player, Mejía joined the youth academy of Spanish second-tier side Zaragoza. In 2019, he joined the youth academy of Manchester United in the English Premier League.

On 28 June 2023, Mejía signed a new contract with Manchester United. He made his senior debut with the under-21 team on 22 August, starting in a 1–1 draw (6–4 penalty win) against Stockport County in the EFL Trophy.

On 18 January 2024, Mejía joined Sevilla Atlético, the reserve team of La Liga club Sevilla, competing in the Segunda Federación. He made his first team debut on 29 September, replacing Gerard Fernández late into a 1–1 away draw against Athletic Bilbao.

On 22 July 2025, Mejía joined Segunda División side Burgos on a three-year contract. On 21 August of the following year, he was loaned to Super League Greece side Panetolikos for one year.

== International career ==
Even though he was born in Spain, Mejía is also eligible to represent Colombia internationally through his parents. He made his debut for the Colombia under-20 side in 2-legged friendly match against Peru under-20 on 13 December 2022.

== Career statistics ==
=== Club ===
As of match played 20 September 2026

Appearances and goals by club, season and competition
Club	Season	League			National cup (Note: Includes Copa del Rey)		Other		Total	
Club	Season	Division	Apps	Goals	Apps	Goals	Apps	Goals	Apps	Goals
Manchester United U21	2023–24	—			—		3 (Note: Appearances in EFL Trophy)	0	3	0
Sevilla B	2023–24	Segunda Federación	16	4	—		—		16	4
Sevilla B	2024–25	Primera Federación	31	7	—		—		31	7
Sevilla B	Total		47	11	—		—		37	11
Sevilla	2024–25	La Liga	1	0	0	0	—		1	0
Burgos	2025–26	Segunda División	23	3	3	0	—		26	3
Burgos	2026–27	Segunda División	1	0	0	0	0	0	1	0
Burgos	Total		24	3	3	0	0	0	27	3
Panetolikos (loan)	2026–27	Super League Greece	4	0	—		—		4	0
Career total			76	14	3	0	3	0	82	14
