= Darío Benavides =

Spanish footballer (born 2003)

Personal information
- Full name: Darío Benavides Fuentes
- Date of birth: 12 January 2003 (age 23)
- Place of birth: Balanegra, Spain
- Height: 1.78 m (5 ft 10 in)
- Position: Defender

Team information
- Current team: Dinamo București
- Number: 22

Youth career
- 2010–2012: Poli Ejido
- 2012–2014: Oriente
- 2014–2018: Almería
- 2018–2022: Sevilla

Senior career*
Years	Team	Apps	(Gls)
2021–2025	Sevilla B	67	(1)
2022–2023	Sevilla C	15	(2)
2023–2025	Sevilla	1	(0)
2025–2026	La Louvière	20	(0)
2026–	Dinamo București	8	(0)
- * Club domestic league appearances and goals as of 1 November 2026

Darío Benavides Fuentes (born 12 January 2003) is a Spanish professional footballer who plays as a defender for Liga I club Dinamo București.

== Career ==
Born in Balanegra, Almería, Andalusia, Benavides joined Sevilla FC's youth setup at the age of 15, after representing UD Almería, CD Oriente and Polideportivo Ejido. He made his senior debut with the reserves on 19 December 2021, coming on as a late substitute in a 4–0 Primera División RFEF away loss to Linares Deportivo.

Benavides started the 2022–23 season as a member of the C-team in Tercera Federación, before definitely moving up to the B's now in Segunda Federación afterwards. He made his first team debut on 1 November 2023, replacing Juanlu Sánchez late into a 3–0 away win over CD Quintanar del Rey, for the campaign's Copa del Rey.

Benavides made his professional – and La Liga – debut on 14 December 2024, replacing Gonzalo Montiel late into a 1–0 home win over RC Celta de Vigo.

In June 2025, Benavides signed a three-year contract with La Louvière in Belgium.

== Career statistics ==
As of 1 November 2026

Appearances and goals by club, season and competition
Club	Season	League			National Cup (Note: Includes Copa del Rey, Belgian Cup, Cupa României)		Europe		Other		Total	
Club	Season	Division	Apps	Goals	Apps	Goals	Apps	Goals	Apps	Goals	Apps	Goals
Sevilla B	2021–22	Primera División RFEF	1	0	—		—		—		1	0
Sevilla B	2022–23	Segunda Federación	8	0	—		—		—		8	0
Sevilla B	2023–24	Segunda Federación	24	0	—		—		—		24	0
Sevilla B	2024–25	Primera Federación	34	1	—		—		—		34	1
Sevilla B	Total		67	1	—		—		—		67	1
Sevilla C	2022–23	Tercera Federación	15	2	—		—		—		15	2
Sevilla	2023–24	La Liga	0	0	2	0	0	0	—		2	0
Sevilla	2024–25	La Liga	1	0	0	0	—		—		1	0
Sevilla	Total		1	0	2	0	0	0	—		3	0
La Louvière	2025–26	Belgian Pro League	20	0	3	0	—		—		23	0
Dinamo București	2026–27	Liga I	8	0	1	0	—		—		9	0
Career total			111	3	6	0	0	0	—		117	3

== Honours ==
Sevilla B

- Segunda Federación: 2023–24
