= José Ángel Carmona =

Spanish footballer (born 2002)

Personal information
- Full name: José Ángel Carmona Navarro
- Date of birth: 29 January 2002 (age 24)
- Place of birth: El Viso del Alcor, Spain
- Height: 1.83 m (6 ft 0 in)
- Positions: Right-back; right wing-back; centre-back

Team information
- Current team: Sevilla
- Number: 22

Youth career
- Sevilla

Senior career*
Years	Team	Apps	(Gls)
2020–2022	Sevilla B	36	(0)
2022–	Sevilla	81	(3)
2023	→ Elche (loan)	9	(1)
2023–2024	→ Getafe (loan)	30	(1)

International career^{‡}
2022–2025	Spain U21	3	(0)
- * Club domestic league appearances and goals as of 27 May 2025 ‡ National team caps and goals as of 03:44, 16 October 2024 (UTC)

José Ángel Carmona Navarro (born 29 January 2002) is a Spanish professional footballer for La Liga club Sevilla. Mainly a right-back and right wing-back, he can also play as a centre-back.

== Club career ==
Born in El Viso del Alcor, Seville, Andalusia, Carmona was a Sevilla FC youth graduate. He made his senior debut with the reserves on 21 November 2020, playing the last nine minutes in a 2–1 Segunda División B away win over Córdoba CF.

On 20 July 2021, Carmona renewed his contract until 2025. He made his first team - and La Liga debut - on 13 March of the following year, replacing Marcos Acuña in a 1–1 away draw against Rayo Vallecano.

On 11 January 2023, Carmona joined fellow La Liga club Elche on loan until the end of the season. On 20 July, he moved to fellow league team Getafe also in a temporary deal.

== Career statistics ==
=== Club ===
As of match played 23 May 2026

Appearances and goals by club, season and competition
Club	Season	League			Copa del Rey		Europe		Total	
Club	Season	Division	Apps	Goals	Apps	Goals	Apps	Goals	Apps	Goals
Sevilla	2021–22	La Liga	1	0	0	0	1 (Note: Appearance in UEFA Europa League)	0	2	0
Sevilla	2022–23	La Liga	10	2	0	0	5 (Note: Appearances in UEFA Champions League)	0	15	2
Sevilla	2024–25	La Liga	35	0	1	0	—		36	0
Sevilla	2025–26	La Liga	35	1	3	0	—		38	1
Sevilla	Total		81	3	4	0	6	0	91	3
Elche (loan)	2022–23	La Liga	9	1	—		—		9	1
Getafe (loan)	2023–24	La Liga	30	1	2	0	—		32	1
Career total			120	5	6	0	6	0	132	5
