= Álvaro Fernández (footballer, born 1998) =

Spanish footballer (born 1998)

Personal information
- Full name: Álvaro Fernández Llorente
- Date of birth: 13 April 1998 (age 28)
- Place of birth: Arnedo, Spain
- Height: 1.85 m (6 ft 1 in)
- Position: Goalkeeper

Team information
- Current team: Deportivo A Coruña
- Number: 25

Youth career
- Osasuna

Senior career*
Years	Team	Apps	(Gls)
2015–2017	Osasuna B	47	(0)
2016	Osasuna	1	(0)
2017–2019	Monaco II	11	(0)
2018–2019	→ Extremadura (loan)	17	(0)
2019–2024	Huesca	100	(0)
2021–2022	→ Brentford (loan)	12	(0)
2022–2023	→ Espanyol (loan)	11	(0)
2024–2025	Sevilla	9	(0)
2026–	Deportivo A Coruña	22	(0)

International career^{‡}
2016	Spain U18	2	(0)
2016–2017	Spain U19	4	(0)
2016	Spain U20	5	(0)
2019–2021	Spain U21	10	(0)
2021	Spain U23	1	(0)
2021	Spain	1	(0)
Medal record
Men's football
Representing Spain
Olympic Games
Silver medal – second place	2020 Tokyo	Team
- * Club domestic league appearances and goals as of 20:00, 24 May 2026 (UTC) ‡ National team caps and goals as of 23:17, 24 August 2021 (UTC)

Álvaro Fernández Llorente (born 13 April 1998), sometimes referred to as Álvaro Ferllo, is a Spanish professional footballer who plays as a goalkeeper for La Liga club Deportivo A Coruña.

== Club career ==
Born in Arnedo, La Rioja, Fernández was invited to play for Real Sociedad in several youth tournaments before signing for CA Osasuna aged 15. He made his senior debut with the reserves on 12 April 2015, starting in a 1–1 away draw against CD Izarra in the Tercera División.

On 25 September 2016 Fernández made his La Liga debut, coming on as a second-half substitute for the injured Mario Fernández in a 3–1 loss at Villarreal CF. It was his maiden appearance for the Osasuna first team, which suffered relegation as dead last.

On 11 July 2017, Fernández signed a three-year deal with Ligue 1 side AS Monaco FC. After only appearing with the reserve team, he returned to Spain on 7 August 2018, after agreeing to a one-year loan deal with Extremadura UD.

On 29 June 2019, Fernández left Monaco and agreed to a three-year contract with SD Huesca, newly relegated to the second division. He was a regular starter during the season as the club returned to the top tier at first attempt.

On 17 August 2021, Premier League club Brentford announced the signing of Fernández on a one year loan-deal, with the option to make the move permanent at the end of the 2021–22 season. On 31 August of the following year, he moved to RCD Espanyol in the top tier, also in a temporary deal.

On 13 August 2024, Fernández signed a one-year contract with Sevilla FC in the top tier. A backup option, he renewed his link until 2027 on 30 June 2025, but agreed to leave the club on 29 December, after being demoted to fourth-choice behind Odysseas Vlachodimos, Ørjan Nyland and youth graduate Alberto Flores.

Hours after leaving Sevilla, Fernández joined Segunda División club Deportivo de La Coruña on an 18-month deal.

== International career ==
Fernández represented Spain at several youth levels up to the under-21s, being the starting goalkeeper in the 2021 UEFA European Under-21 Championship (a namesake in the same position, the slightly younger Álvaro Fernández Calvo, was also selected during the same period).

Due to the isolation of some national team players following the positive COVID-19 test of Sergio Busquets, Spain's under-21 squad were called up for the senior team's international friendly against Lithuania on 8 June 2021. Fernández made his senior debut in the match, which ended in a 4–0 win; by doing so, he became the first Huesca player to appear for the Spain national team in the club's entire history.

== Career statistics ==
=== Club ===
As of match played 24 May 2026

Appearances and goals by club, season and competition
Club	Season	League			National Cup		League Cup		Total	
Club	Season	Division	Apps	Goals	Apps	Goals	Apps	Goals	Apps	Goals
Osasuna	2016–17	La Liga	1	0	0	0	―		1	0
Monaco	2017–18	Ligue 1	0	0	0	0	―		0	0
Extremadura (loan)	2018–19	Segunda División	17	0	1	0	―		18	0
Huesca	2019–20	Segunda División	36	0	0	0	―		36	0
Huesca	2020–21	La Liga	22	0	0	0	―		22	0
Huesca	2023–24	Segunda División	42	0	0	0	―		42	0
Huesca	Total		100	0	0	0	―		100	0
Brentford (loan)	2021–22	Premier League	12	0	0	0	4	0	16	0
Espanyol (loan)	2022–23	La Liga	11	0	1	0	―		12	0
Sevilla	2024–25	La Liga	9	0	2	0	―		11	0
Deportivo La Coruña	2025–26	Segunda División	22	0	―		―		22	0
Deportivo La Coruña	2026–27	La Liga	0	0	0	0	―		0	0
Deportivo La Coruña	Total		22	0	0	0	―		22	0
Career total			172	0	4	0	4	0	180	0

=== International ===
As of match played 8 June 2021

Appearances and goals by national team and year
National team	Year	Apps	Goals
Spain	2021	1	0
Total		1	0

== Honours ==
Spain U23

- Summer Olympic silver medal: 2020
