= Dodi Lukébakio =

Belgian footballer (born 1997)

- Lukébakio with Belgium in 2026

Personal information
- Full name: Dodi Lukébakio Ngandoli
- Date of birth: 24 September 1997 (age 29)
- Place of birth: Asse, Belgium
- Height: 1.87 m (6 ft 2 in)
- Positions: Right winger; right midfielder

Team information
- Current team: Benfica
- Number: 11

Youth career
- –2015: Anderlecht

Senior career*
Years	Team	Apps	(Gls)
2015–2018	Anderlecht	17	(1)
2016–2017	→ Toulouse (loan)	5	(0)
2017–2018	→ Charleroi (loan)	19	(3)
2018–2019	Charleroi	0	(0)
2018–2019	Watford	1	(0)
2018–2019	→ Fortuna Düsseldorf (loan)	31	(10)
2019–2023	Hertha BSC	94	(24)
2021–2022	→ VfL Wolfsburg (loan)	19	(1)
2023–2025	Sevilla	63	(17)
2025–	Benfica	23	(0)

International career^{‡}
2016	DR Congo	1	(0)
2017–2019	Belgium U21	17	(4)
2020–	Belgium	39	(8)
- * Club domestic league appearances and goals as of 23:28, 20 September 2026 (UTC) ‡ National team caps and goals as of 22:55, 15 November 2026 (UTC)

Dodi Lukébakio Ngandoli (born 24 September 1997) is a Belgian professional footballer who plays as a right winger or right midfielder for Primeira Liga club Benfica and the Belgium national team.

== Club career ==
=== Anderlecht ===
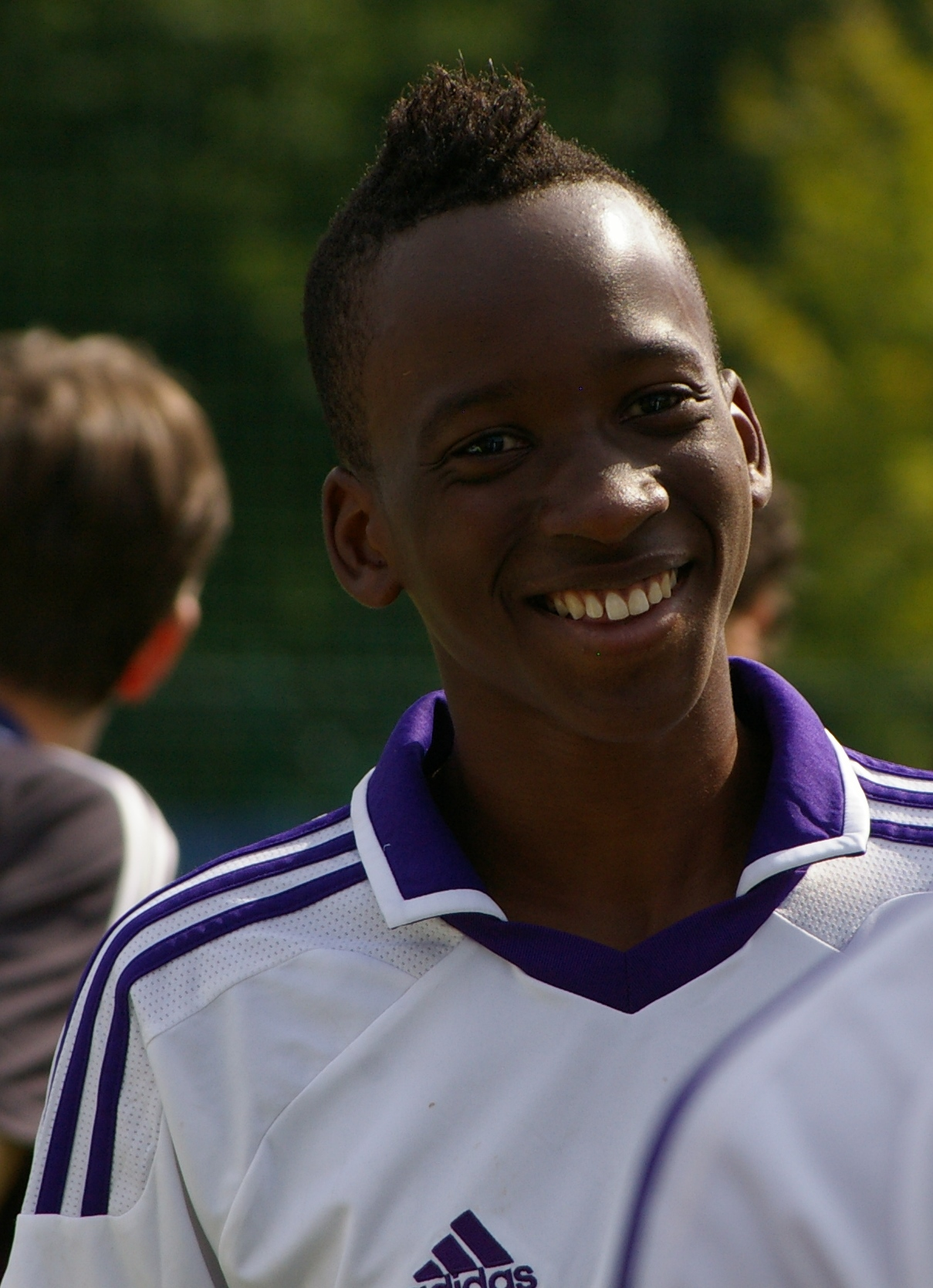
Lukébakio pictured during his time at Anderlecht in 2012.

On 25 October 2015, Lukébakio made his professional debut in the 79th minute as a substitute for Youri Tielemans in a Belgian First Division A match against Club Brugge, which result in a 3–1 victory for Anderlecht. On 7 December 2015, Lukébakio signed a new five-year contract. Three days later, he made his first UEFA Europa League debut as a substitute for Imoh Ezekiel in the 66th minute of a 2–1 win against Qarabağ FK. On 29 January 2016, he played his first full match for Anderlecht, a 2–1 away win over Sint-Truden. On 28 February 2016, after coming on as a substitute for Alexander Büttner, he scored an equaliser in the 74th minute in a 3–3 draw against Standard Liège.

==== 2016–17 season: Loan to Toulouse ====
On 31 August 2016, Lukébakio signed for French club Toulouse FC. On 8 January, he made his debut for Toulouse in the round of 64 of the Coupe de France, as a substitute, replacing Ola Toivonen in the 58th minute of a 2–1 home defeat against Olympique de Marseille. On 14 January, Lukébakio made his Ligue 1 debut as a substitute replacing Issiaga Sylla in the 56th minute of a 1–0 defeat against Nantes. Lukébakio ended his loan to Touluse with 5 appearances, all as a substitute.

==== 2017–18 season: Loan to Sporting Charleroi ====
On 2 July 2017, Lukébakio was signed by Charleroi on a season-long loan deal. On 29 July, he made his debut for Charleroi in a Belgian First Division A match against Kortrijk, which result in a 1–0 home win for Charleroi. On 5 August, he scored two goals in a match against Royal Excel Mouscron, the match finished with a 5–2 away victory for Charleroi. On 5 November, he scored his third goal in the 71st minute of a 3–1 away win over Antwerp.

=== Watford ===
On 30 January 2018, it was announced that Lukébakio would be joining Watford on a four-and-a-half-year deal. On 10 February, he made his Premier League debut during Watford's 2–0 defeat away to West Ham United.

==== Loan to Fortuna Düsseldorf ====
On 23 July 2018, Lukébakio joined Fortuna Düsseldorf on a loan deal for the 2018–19 season. On 24 November 2018, Lukébakio became the first player in Bundesliga history to net three goals against Manuel Neuer in a 3–3 draw against Bayern Munich. The following month, he again found the back of the net in a 2–1 win, as Düsseldorf handed the Bundesliga leaders Borussia Dortmund their first league defeat of the season.

=== Hertha BSC ===
On 1 August 2019, Lukébakio transferred to Hertha BSC. He scored Hertha's first goal of the 2019–20 Bundesliga season in the team's opening match against Bayern Munich; a 2–2 draw.

=== Sevilla ===
On 24 August 2023, Lukébakio signed a five-year contract with La Liga side Sevilla. On 17 September, he scored a goal on his debut in a 1–0 victory over Las Palmas.

=== Benfica ===
On 1 September 2025, Lukébakio joined Primeira Liga club Benfica for a transfer fee of €20 million, plus €4 million in bonuses. He signed a five-year contract with the club, with a release clause of €50 million.

== International career ==
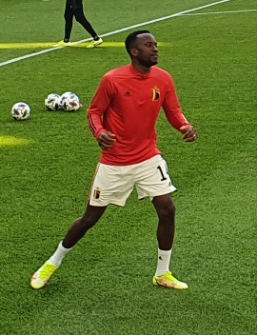
Dodi Lukébakio warming-up in the Nations League in Italy (2021)

Lukébakio was born in Belgium to a Congolese-French father and Belgian mother. Lukébakio holds French citizenship from his father since Congolese citizenship is not compatible with dual citizenship. Lukébakio made his debut for the DR Congo national football team in a friendly 1–0 loss to Kenya on 4 October 2016. He later switched allegiance to represent Belgium at the U21 level. In October 2020 he was called up to the senior Belgium squad for the friendly against Ivory Coast and the UEFA Nations League matches against England and Iceland on 8, 11 and 14 October 2020, respectively.

On 14 October 2023, Lukébakio scored his first two senior international goals in Belgium's 3–2 UEFA Euro 2024 qualifying win over Austria.

On 15 May 2026, he was named in Belgium's squad for the 2026 FIFA World Cup.

== Career statistics ==
=== Club ===
As of match played 20 September 2026

Appearances and goals by club, season and competition
Club	Season	League			National cup (Note: Includes Coupe de France, Belgian Cup, DFB-Pokal, Copa del Rey, Taça de Portugal)		League cup (Note: Includes Taça da Liga)		Continental		Total	
Club	Season	Division	Apps	Goals	Apps	Goals	Apps	Goals	Apps	Goals	Apps	Goals
Anderlecht	2015–16	Belgian Pro League	17	1	0	0	—		1 (Note: Appearance(s) in UEFA Europa League)	0	18	1
Toulouse (loan)	2016–17	Ligue 1	5	0	1	0	—		—		6	0
Toulouse II (loan)	2016–17	CFA 2	6	3	—		—		—		6	3
Sporting Charleroi (loan)	2017–18	Belgian Pro League	19	3	1	0	—		—		20	3
Watford	2017–18	Premier League	1	0	—		0	0	—		1	0
Fortuna Düsseldorf (loan)	2018–19	Bundesliga	31	10	3	4	—		—		34	14
Hertha BSC	2019–20	Bundesliga	30	7	3	1	—		—		33	8
Hertha BSC	2020–21	Bundesliga	29	5	1	2	—		—		30	7
Hertha BSC	2021–22	Bundesliga	3	1	1	0	—		—		4	1
Hertha BSC	2022–23	Bundesliga	32	11	1	1	—		—		33	12
Hertha BSC	Total		94	24	6	4	—		—		100	28
VfL Wolfsburg (loan)	2021–22	Bundesliga	19	1	—		—		6 (Note: Appearances in UEFA Champions League)	0	25	1
Sevilla	2023–24	La Liga	23	5	0	0	—		4	0	27	5
Sevilla	2024–25	La Liga	38	11	1	0	—		—		39	11
Sevilla	2025–26	La Liga	2	1	—		—		—		2	1
Sevilla	Total		63	17	1	0	—		4	0	68	17
Benfica	2025–26	Primeira Liga	17	0	1	0	1	1	4	0	23	1
Benfica	2026–27	Primeira Liga	6	0	0	0	0	0	4	2	10	2
Benfica	Total		23	0	1	0	1	1	8	2	33	3
Career total			278	59	13	8	1	1	19	2	311	70

=== International ===
As of match played 15 November 2026

Appearances and goals by national team and year
National team	Year	Apps	Goals
Belgium	2020	1	0
Belgium	2021	3	0
Belgium	2022	1	0
Belgium	2023	7	2
Belgium	2024	12	0
Belgium	2025	3	0
Belgium	2026	12	6
Total		39	8

Scores and results list Belgium's goal tally first.

List of international goals scored by Dodi Lukébakio
No.	Date	Venue	Opponent	Score	Result	Competition
1.	13 October 2023	Ernst-Happel-Stadion, Vienna, Austria	Austria	1–0	3–2	UEFA Euro 2024 qualifying
2.	13 October 2023	Ernst-Happel-Stadion, Vienna, Austria	Austria	2–0	3–2	UEFA Euro 2024 qualifying
3.	28 March 2026	Mercedes-Benz Stadium, Atlanta, United States	United States	4–1	5–2	Friendly
4.	28 March 2026	Mercedes-Benz Stadium, Atlanta, United States	United States	5–1	5–2	Friendly
5.	31 March 2026	Soldier Field, Chicago, United States	Mexico	1–1	1–1	Friendly
6.	6 June 2026	King Baudouin Stadium, Brussels, Belgium	Tunisia	4–0	5–0	Friendly
7.	25 September 2026	Stadio Olimpico, Rome, Italy	Italy	2–0	2–0	2026–27 UEFA Nations League A
8.	5 October 2026	Stade de France, Saint-Denis, France	France	1–0	1–4	2026–27 UEFA Nations League A

== Honours ==
Individual

- Bundesliga Rookie of the Month: December 2018

== See also ==
- List of association footballers who have been capped for two senior national teams
