= Andrés Castrín =

Spanish footballer

Personal information
- Full name: Andrés López Gallo
- Date of birth: 26 May 2003 (age 23)
- Place of birth: Riotorto, Spain
- Height: 1.88 m (6 ft 2 in)
- Position: Centre-back

Team information
- Current team: Sevilla
- Number: 5

Youth career
- Lourenzá
- 2014–2017: Lugo
- 2017–2018: Racing Villalbés
- 2018–2021: Lugo

Senior career*
Years	Team	Apps	(Gls)
2021–2023	Polvorín	39	(1)
2021–2024	Lugo	25	(1)
2024–2025	Sevilla B	34	(1)
2025–	Sevilla	19	(1)
- * Club domestic league appearances and goals as of 27 May 2026

Andrés López Gallo (born 26 May 2003), known as Andrés Castrín or just Castrín, is a Spanish footballer who plays as a central defender for Sevilla.

== Club career ==
Born in Riotorto, Lugo, Galicia, Castrín played for ED Lourenzá, CD Lugo and Racing Club Villalbés as a youth. In 2021, after finishing his formation, he was assigned to Lugo's farm team Polvorín FC in the Tercera División RFEF.

Castrín made his senior debut on 25 September 2021, starting in a 0–0 away draw against Ourense CF. He scored his first senior goal on 31 October, netting his team's second in a 3–1 away win over UD Somozas.

Castrín made his first-team debut for Lugo on 2 December 2021, starting in a 2–2 away draw (4–3 penalty win) against AD Unión Adarve in the season's Copa del Rey. He made his professional debut fourteen days later, starting in a 1–2 home loss against CD Mirandés, also in the national cup.

On 10 July 2024, Castrín signed a three-year contract with Sevilla FC, being initially assigned to the reserves in Primera Federación. He made his first team debut on 5 December, starting in a 3–1 Copa del Rey away win over UE Olot.

== Club statistics ==
As of match played 23 April 2026

Appearances and goals by club, season and competition
Club	Season	League			Copa del Rey		Europe		Total	
Club	Season	Division	Apps	Goals	Apps	Goals	Apps	Goals	Apps	Goals
Sevilla	2024–25	La Liga	0	0	1	0	—		1	0
Sevilla	2025–26	La Liga	19	1	2	0	—		16	0
Career total			14	0	3	0	0	0	17	0

== Personal life ==
Castrín's older brother Pablo (also known as Castrín) is also a footballer and a centre back. Their father, Juan López, also played amateur football for local side Riotorto CF.
