= Manu Bueno =

Spanish footballer (born 2004)

Personal information
- Full name: Manuel Bueno Sebastián
- Date of birth: 27 July 2004 (age 22)
- Place of birth: Jerez de la Frontera, Spain
- Height: 1.78 m (5 ft 10 in)
- Position: Midfielder

Team information
- Current team: Sevilla
- Number: 14

Youth career
- Marianistas Jerez
- 2014–2022: Sevilla

Senior career*
Years	Team	Apps	(Gls)
2021–2026	Sevilla B	76	(3)
2023–	Sevilla	24	(1)
- * Club domestic league appearances and goals as of 23 April 2026

Manuel Bueno Sebastián (born 27 July 2004) is a Spanish professional footballer who plays as a midfielder for La Liga club Sevilla.

== Club career ==
Born in Jerez de la Frontera, Cádiz, Andalusia, Bueno joined Sevilla FC's youth setup at the age of ten, from hometown side AD Marianistas Jerez. He made his senior debut with the reserves on 10 October 2021, coming on as a second-half substitute for Juanlu Sánchez in a 5–1 Primera División RFEF away loss against Villarreal CF B.

Bueno started the 2022–23 season as a full member of the B-team, now in Segunda Federación, and renewed his contract until 2026 on 15 May 2023. He made his first team – and La Liga – debut twelve days later, starting in a 2–1 home loss against Real Madrid.

== International career ==
On 26 May 2021, Bueno was called up to Spain at under-17 and under-18 levels in 2021 and 2022, respectively.

== Career statistics ==
=== Club ===
As of match played 23 April 2026

Appearances and goals by club, season and competition
Club	Season	League			Copa del Rey		Europe		Other		Total	
Club	Season	Division	Apps	Goals	Apps	Goals	Apps	Goals	Apps	Goals	Apps	Goals
Sevilla	2022–23	La Liga	2	0	0	0	0	0	—		2	0
Sevilla	2023–24	La Liga	4	0	2	0	0	0	0	0	6	0
Sevilla	2024–25	La Liga	9	1	1	0	—		—		10	1
Sevilla	2025–26	La Liga	8	0	2	0	—		—		10	0
Sevilla	2026–27	La Liga	1	0	0	0	—		—		1	0
Career total			24	1	5	0	0	0	0	0	29	1

== Honours ==
Sevilla

- UEFA Europa League: 2022–23
