= Alberto Flores =

Spanish footballer (born 2003)

Personal information
- Full name: Alberto Flores López
- Date of birth: 10 November 2003 (age 23)
- Place of birth: Fuentes de Andalucía, Spain
- Height: 1.86 m (6 ft 1 in)
- Position: Goalkeeper

Team information
- Current team: Granada
- Number: 1

Youth career
- 2013–2021: Sevilla

Senior career*
Years	Team	Apps	(Gls)
2021–2026	Sevilla B	114	(0)
2022–2026	Sevilla	0	(0)
2026–	Granada	0	(0)

International career
2019	Spain U19	1	(0)
- * Club domestic league appearances and goals as of 29 March 2026

Alberto Flores López (born 10 November 2003) is a Spanish professional footballer who plays as a goalkeeper for Segunda División club Granada.

== Career ==
A youth product of Sevilla FC's youth academy, in 2013 Sevilla's then goalkeeper Andrés Palop gave Flores his last ever match shirt before retiring. After working his way up their youth levels, he debuted with the reserves in the 2020–21 season and signed his first professional contract with the club on 6 May 2021 for three seasons.

In the 2022–23 season, Flores joined the preseason for the senior team and was formally promoted as their third goalkeeper. He was on the bench as third goalkeeper for Sevilla during the 2023 UEFA Europa League final on 31 May 2023 He made his senior and professional debut with Sevilla in a 3–1 Copa del Rey win over Getafe CF on 16 January 2024, dedicating his shirt to Andrés Palop in turn.

On 10 August 2026, after being mainly used in the B-team, Sevilla announced Flores' transfer to Segunda División side Granada CF.

== International career ==
In September 2021, Flores debuted for the Spain U19s in a match against the Mexico U19s.

== Career statistics ==
=== Club ===
As of match played 29 March 2026

Appearances and goals by club, season and competition
Club	Season	League			National Cup		Europe		Other		Total	
Club	Season	Division	Apps	Goals	Apps	Goals	Apps	Goals	Apps	Goals	Apps	Goals
Sevilla B	2020–21	Segunda División B	1	0	―		―		―		1	0
Sevilla B	2021–22	Primera División RFEF	0	0	―		―		―		0	0
Sevilla B	2022–23	Segunda Federación	31	0	―		―		―		27	0
Sevilla B	2023–24	Segunda Federación	27	0	―		―		―		27	0
Sevilla B	2024–25	Primera Federación	30	0	―		―		―		30	0
Sevilla B	2025–26	Primera Federación	25	0	―		―		―		25	0
Sevilla B	Total		114	0	―		―		―		114	0
Sevilla	2021–22	La Liga	0	0	0	0	0	0	―		0	0
Sevilla	2022–23	La Liga	0	0	0	0	0	0	―		0	0
Sevilla	2023–24	La Liga	0	0	1	0	0	0	0	0	1	0
Sevilla	2024–25	La Liga	0	0	0	0	―		―		0	0
Sevilla	2025–26	La Liga	0	0	0	0	―		―		0	0
Sevilla	Total		0	0	1	0	0	0	0	0	1	0
Career total			114	0	1	0	0	0	0	0	115	0

== Honours ==
Sevilla

- UEFA Europa League: 2022–23
