= Gerard Fernández =

Spanish footballer (born 2002)

Peque Fernández
Personal information
- Full name: Gerard Fernández Castellano
- Date of birth: 4 October 2002 (age 24)
- Place of birth: L'Hospitalet de Llobregat, Spain
- Height: 1.72 m (5 ft 8 in)
- Position: Forward

Team information
- Current team: Sevilla
- Number: 10

Youth career
- 2011–2014: Cornellà
- 2014–2016: Barcelona
- 2016–2019: Cornellà
- 2019–2020: Barcelona

Senior career*
Years	Team	Apps	(Gls)
2018–2019	Cornellà	2	(0)
2019–2022	Barcelona B	42	(7)
2022–2024	Racing Santander	63	(19)
2024–	Sevilla	57	(4)

International career^{‡}
2020	Spain U18	1	(0)
2024	Spain U21	2	(1)
- * Club domestic league appearances and goals as of 21 November 2026 ‡ National team caps and goals as of 03:50, 16 October 2024 (UTC)

Gerard Fernández Castellano (born 4 October 2002), known as Peque Fernández, is a Spanish professional footballer who plays as a forward for La Liga club Sevilla.

== Club career ==
Born in L'Hospitalet de Llobregat, Barcelona, Catalonia, Fernández joined the youth setup of Cornellà in 2011. in 2014, he departed for Barcelona, however after two years he returned to Cornellà.

Aged 16, Fernández made his senior debut for Cornellà in the Copa Federación de España and later in the Segunda División B. On 5 September 2019, Fernández returned to La Masia, signing a three-year contract, with an option for a further two. On 9 February 2020, Fernández was included in García Pimienta's squad for a match against Villarreal B. He scored on his Barcelona B debut, playing as a starter in the 3–2 loss at home.

On 7 July 2022, Fernández signed with newly promoted Segunda División side Racing Santander on a two-year deal, following the expiration of his Barcelona contract. In the 2023–24 campaign, he was the club's top scorer with 18 goals as they narrowly missed out a play-off spot.

On 10 July 2024, La Liga side Sevilla announced they had reached an agreement with Racing for the signing of Fernández, who agreed to a four-year contract.

== International career ==
In February 2020, Fernández received a call up to Spain's under-18 team from Pablo Amo for a friendly against Denmark. He made his debut on 26 February as a starter in a 2–1 win.

== Career statistics ==
=== Club ===
As of match played 21 November 2026

Club	Season	League			Cup		Other		Total	
Club	Season	Division	Apps	Goals	Apps	Goals	Apps	Goals	Apps	Goals
Barcelona B	2019–20	Segunda División B	4	1	—		2	0	6	1
Barcelona B	2020–21	Segunda División B	19	3	—		1	0	20	3
Barcelona B	2021–22	Primera Federación	19	3	—		—		19	3
Barcelona B	Total		42	7	—		3	0	45	7
Racing Santander	2022–23	Segunda División	23	1	1	0	—		24	1
Racing Santander	2023–24	Segunda División	40	18	1	1	—		41	19
Racing Santander	Total		63	19	2	1	—		65	20
Sevilla	2024–25	La Liga	26	1	3	0	—		29	1
Sevilla	2025–26	La Liga	26	2	2	1	—		28	3
Sevilla	2026–27	La Liga	5	1	1	1	—		6	2
Sevilla	Total		57	4	6	2	—		63	6
Career total			162	30	8	3	3	0	173	33
