= Ramón Martínez (footballer, born 2002) =

Spanish footballer (born 2003)

Personal information
- Full name: Ramón Martínez Gil
- Date of birth: 22 October 2002 (age 24)
- Place of birth: Mula, Spain
- Height: 1.85 m (6 ft 1 in)
- Position: Centre-back

Team information
- Current team: Valladolid
- Number: 5

Youth career
- Muleño
- 2014–2018: Villarreal
- 2018–2020: UCAM Murcia
- 2019–2020: → Levante (loan)

Senior career*
Years	Team	Apps	(Gls)
2019–2022	UCAM Murcia B	54	(3)
2020–2022	UCAM Murcia	3	(0)
2022–2025	Sevilla B	75	(4)
2024–2026	Sevilla	7	(1)
2026–	Valladolid	16	(0)
- * Club domestic league appearances and goals as of 9 June 2026

Ramón Martínez Gil (born 22 October 2002) is a Spanish professional footballer who plays as a centre-back for Real Valladolid.

== Career ==
Born in Mula, Region of Murcia, Martínez began his career with hometown side Muleño CF before moving to Villarreal CF in 2014. He left the club in 2018 and signed for UCAM Murcia CF, and made his first team debut with the latter's reserves on 12 May 2019, starting in a 1–0 Tercera División away loss to Club Olímpico de Totana.

In July 2019, Martínez was loaned to Levante UD and returned to youth football, but moved back to UCAM the following January, becoming a permanent member of the B-team. He made his first team debut on 11 October 2020, in a 2–1 Copa Federación de España away win over Moralo CP.

On 12 July 2022, Martínez signed a two-year contract with Sevilla FC, being initially assigned to the B-side in Segunda Federación. On 4 July 2024, he renewed his link until 2027, and made his debut with the main squad on 30 October, playing the full 90 minutes in a 3–0 away win over Las Rozas CF, for the season's Copa del Rey.

Martínez made his professional – and La Liga – debut on 16 February 2025, coming on as a late substitute for Nemanja Gudelj in a 4–0 away routing of Real Valladolid. He scored his first professional goal on 25 May, but in a 4–2 loss at Villarreal CF, and was definitely promoted to the main squad on 1 September.

On 7 January 2026, after being rarely used afterwards, Martínez signed a three-and-a-half-year contract with Valladolid in Segunda División.
