= Juanlu Sánchez =

Spanish footballer (born 2003)

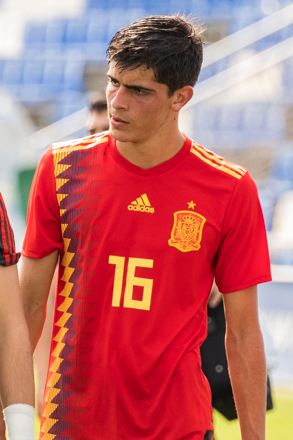
- Juanlu with Spain U18 in 2019

Personal information
- Full name: Juan Luis Sánchez Velasco
- Date of birth: 15 August 2003 (age 23)
- Place of birth: Dos Hermanas, Seville, Spain
- Height: 1.86 m (6 ft 1 in)
- Positions: Right-back; right wing-back

Team information
- Current team: Bournemouth
- Number: 24

Youth career
- 2009–2010: Los Caminantes
- 2010–2015: San Alberto Magno
- 2015–2019: Sevilla

Senior career*
Years	Team	Apps	(Gls)
2019–2022	Sevilla B	68	(7)
2021–2026	Sevilla	91	(4)
2022–2023	→ Mirandés (loan)	37	(2)
2026–	Bournemouth	0	(0)

International career^{‡}
2019	Spain U16	3	(0)
2019–2020	Spain U17	3	(0)
2019	Spain U18	2	(1)
2021–2022	Spain U19	10	(1)
2023–2025	Spain U21	13	(0)
2024	Spain U23	4	(1)
Medal record
Men's football
Representing Spain
Olympic Games
Gold medal – first place	2024 Paris
- * Club domestic league appearances and goals as of 23:34, 17 May 2026 (UTC) ‡ National team caps and goals as of 23:57, 21 June 2025 (UTC)

Juan Luis Sánchez Velasco (born 15 August 2003), commonly known as Juanlu Sánchez or simply Juanlu, is a Spanish professional footballer who plays as a right-back or right wing-back for Premier League club Bournemouth.

== Club career ==
Born in Dos Hermanas, Seville, Andalusia, Juanlu began his career with CD Los Caminantes at the age of six. In the following year, he moved to CD San Alberto Magno, and joined Sevilla's youth setup in 2015, aged 12. On 13 August 2019, after finishing his formation, he signed his first professional contract with the latter club, and was subsequently promoted to the reserves in the Segunda División B.

=== Sevilla ===
Juanlu made his senior debut at the age of 16 on 24 August 2019, starting in a 0–0 home draw against Yeclano Deportivo. He scored his first senior goal on 18 November of the following year, netting the B's second in a 2–2 draw at Granada. Juanlu made his first-team debut on 15 December 2021, starting in a 1–1 away draw (6–5 penalty win) against Andratx in the season's Copa del Rey. His La Liga debut occurred six days later, as he came on as a late substitute for Papu Gómez in a 1–1 home draw against Barcelona.

=== Mirandes (loan) and Return to Sevilla ===
On 8 August 2022, Juanlu joined Segunda División club Mirandés on a season-long loan. He scored his first professional goal on 6 December, netting his team's second in a 2–2 draw at Leganés. After the departure of Raúl Parra to Cádiz, Juanlu established himself as a regular starter for the Jabatos, but as a right back.

On 16 February 2025, Juanlu scored a brace and made an assist to Isaac Romero in an away league match against Real Valladolid at the Estadio José Zorrilla. On 10 April 2025, Juanlu Sánchez signed a contract extension with the Sevilla that will keep him there until at least June 2029.

=== Bournemouth ===
On 6 August 2026, Juanlu signed for Premier League side Bournemouth in a deal worth up to £11.2m.

== International career ==
Juanlu is a Spain youth international, having represented the country at under-16, under-17, under-18 and under-19 levels. He received his first call-up to the Spain U21 in October 2023 for a friendly against Uzbekistan and a 2025 UEFA European Under-21 Championship qualification match against Kazakhstan.

In 2024, Juanlu was called up to the Spain U23 for the 2024 Summer Olympics. He was one of four reserve players not initially included in the main squad but eligible for inclusion in case of injury. He was later added to the starting lineup for the second Group C match against the Dominican Republic, playing the full 90 minutes.

He appeared as a substitute in the 62nd minute of the semi-final match against Morocco, replacing Marc Pubill. Juanlu scored the decisive goal of the match with a right-footed shot from the right side of the box into the bottom left corner, securing Spain’s place in the final. He also came on as a substitute in the final, where Spain defeated France 5–3 after extra time, earning the gold medal.

In 2025, Juanlu was included in the squad for the 2025 UEFA European Under-21 Championship in Slovakia. He started in the opening match against the hosts, Slovakia, and provided an assist for Spain's second goal in a 3–2 victory. He also started in the quarter-final match against England, which ended in a 3–1 defeat, resulting in Spain's elimination.

== Style of play ==
Juanlu is a versatile winger known for his strong offensive abilities and his contribution to both defensive and offensive phases of play. Primarily deployed as a right-winger, Juanlu is also capable of playing as a right midfielder, right-back or even in central midfield when required. He possesses solid dribbling skills and vision, which allow him to create chances for his teammates. In addition to his offensive strengths, he is particularly effective in tackling, blocking, and aerial duels, making him a reliable presence on the right flank.

He has drawn comparisons to club legend Jesús Navas due to their shared background as products of Sevilla's academy and their versatility along the right side of the pitch. Following Navas’ retirement, Juanlu inherited the number 16 shirt.

García Pimienta, Sevilla's head coach, has deployed Juanlu in midfield when the team faced shortages in that area. Commenting on his adaptability, Pimienta stated: "He's a kid who works really hard and is very capable of attacking, and he also has a good goal-scoring ability. He's capable of playing there."

== Career statistics ==
=== Club ===
As of match played 8 September 2026

Appearances and goals by club, season and competition
Club	Season	League			National cup (Note: Includes Copa del Rey)		League cup (Note: Includes EFL Cup)		Europe		Other		Total	
Club	Season	Division	Apps	Goals	Apps	Goals	Apps	Goals	Apps	Goals	Apps	Goals	Apps	Goals
Sevilla	2021–22	La Liga	1	0	1	0	—		0	0	—		2	0
Sevilla	2023–24	La Liga	26	0	4	1	—		6 (Note: Appearances in UEFA Champions League)	0	1 (Note: Appearance in UEFA Super Cup)	0	37	1
Sevilla	2024–25	La Liga	32	4	3	1	—		—		—		35	5
Sevilla	2025–26	La Liga	32	0	3	0	—		—		—		35	0
Sevilla	Total		91	4	11	2	—		6	0	1	0	109	6
Mirandés (loan)	2022–23	Segunda División	37	2	1	0	—		—		—		38	2
Bournemouth	2026–27	Premier League	0	0	0	0	1	0	0	0	—		1	0
Career total			128	6	12	2	1	0	6	0	1	0	148	8

== Honours ==
Spain U23

- Summer Olympics gold medal: 2024
