= Pedro Ortiz (footballer, born 2000) =

Spanish footballer (born 2000)

Personal information
- Full name: Pedro Ortiz Bernat
- Date of birth: 19 August 2000 (age 26)
- Place of birth: Sóller, Spain
- Height: 1.84 m (6 ft 0 in)
- Position: Midfielder

Team information
- Current team: Ibiza

Youth career
- Atlético Baleares

Senior career*
Years	Team	Apps	(Gls)
2018–2019	Atlético Baleares	11	(1)
2019–2023	Sevilla B	59	(4)
2021–2025	Sevilla	2	(0)
2023–2024	→ Vizela (loan)	24	(0)
2025–2026	Córdoba	36	(4)
2026–	Ibiza	0	(0)
- * Club domestic league appearances and goals as of 6 June 2026

Pedro Ortiz Bernat (born 19 August 2000) is a Spanish professional footballer who plays as a midfielder for UD Ibiza.

== Career ==
Born in Sóller, Mallorca, Balearic Islands, Ortiz was a CD Atlético Baleares youth graduate. He made his senior team debut on 2 September 2018, coming on as a second-half substitute for Kike López in a 1–0 Segunda División B home win against CD Alcoyano.

Ortiz scored his first senior goal on 24 March 2019, netting his team's second in a 2–0 away success over RCD Espanyol B. On 5 July, Sevilla FC reached an agreement in principle with Atlético Baleares for the signing of Ortiz, and he signed a four-year deal three days later, being assigned to the reserves also in the third division.

Ortiz made his first team – and La Liga – debut with the Andalusians on 15 August 2021, replacing Joan Jordán late into a 3–0 home defeat of Rayo Vallecano.

On 17 January 2023, Sevilla sent Ortiz on loan to Primeira Liga club Vizela until the end of the 2022–23 season. On 16 August, his loan was renewed for a further year.

Ortiz returned to Sevilla in July 2024, but made no league appearances until moving to Segunda División side Córdoba CF the following 31 January. He left the club in June 2026, and signed for UD Ibiza in Primera Federación on 16 July.
