= Isaac Romero =

Spanish footballer (born 2000)

Personal information
- Full name: Isaac Romero Bernal
- Date of birth: 18 May 2000 (age 26)
- Place of birth: Lebrija, Spain
- Height: 1.83 m (6 ft 0 in)
- Position: Forward

Team information
- Current team: Sevilla
- Number: 16

Youth career
- Sevilla
- Antoniano
- 2016–2017: Balón de Cádiz
- 2017–2018: Antoniano

Senior career*
Years	Team	Apps	(Gls)
2017–2019	Antoniano	35	(11)
2019–2020	Sevilla C	13	(8)
2020–2024	Sevilla B	72	(24)
2024–	Sevilla	74	(12)
- * Club domestic league appearances and goals as of 27 May 2026

Isaac Romero Bernal (born 18 May 2000) is a Spanish professional footballer who plays as a forward for La Liga club Sevilla.

== Career ==
=== Early career ===
Romero was born in Lebrija, Seville, Andalusia, and represented the youth sides of Sevilla FC, CA Antoniano and Cádiz CF's affiliate side Balón de Cádiz CF. He returned to Antoniano in November 2017; initially a member of the Juvenil squad, he made his first team debut on 17 December, coming on as a second-half substitute in a 2–0 División de Honor Andaluza home win over CD Ciudad Jardín.

Romero became a regular starter for Antoniano during the 2018–19 season, scoring 11 goals as the club achieved promotion to Tercera División.

=== Sevilla ===
On 8 July 2019, Romero returned to his first club Sevilla for an undisclosed fee, plus two consecutive friendlies in the summers of 2019 and 2020 and a number of variables. He was initially assigned to the C-team also in the fourth division.

Romero made his first appearance with the reserves on 2 February 2020, replacing José Lara but being sent off in a 2–1 Segunda División B away win over Cádiz CF B. He was definitely promoted to the B's for the 2020–21 campaign, only missing out a few matches due to a shoulder injury.

On 12 August 2021, Romero signed a professional contract with the Nervionenses until 2025. However, he spent the season as a fourth-choice behind Iván Romero, David Santisteban and Carlos Álvarez as the B-team suffered relegation from Primera División RFEF.

Romero became a regular starter for Sevilla Atlético in the 2022–23 season, being their top scorer with eight goals, and featured with the first team in the 2023 pre-season. On 10 September 2023, after scoring a brace in a 4–1 away routing of Orihuela CF in the previous round, he netted a hat-trick for the B's in a 3–0 home win over FC Cartagena B; he later reached 11 goals in only 14 matches during the 2023–24 campaign.

On 11 January 2024, Romero was promoted to the first team of Sevilla, being assigned the number 20 jersey. He made his professional – and La Liga – debut the following day, starting in a 3–2 home loss to Deportivo Alavés.

Romero scored his first professional goals on 16 January 2024, netting a brace in a 3–1 Copa del Rey away win over Getafe CF. He scored his first goal in the main category of Spanish football five days later, netting the opener in a 5–1 away loss to Girona FC.

== Career statistics ==
=== Club ===
As of match played 23 May 2026

Appearances and goals by club, season and competition
Club	Season	League			Copa del Rey		Europe		Other		Total	
Club	Season	Division	Apps	Goals	Apps	Goals	Apps	Goals	Apps	Goals	Apps	Goals
Antoniano	2017–18	División de Honor	9	0	—		—		—		9	0
Antoniano	2018–19	División de Honor	26	11	—		—		—		26	11
Antoniano	Total		35	11	—		—		—		35	11
Sevilla C	2019–20	Tercera División	13	8	—		—		—		13	8
Sevilla Atlético	2019–20	Segunda División B	4	0	—		—		—		4	0
Sevilla Atlético	2020–21	Segunda División B	21	4	—		—		—		21	4
Sevilla Atlético	2021–22	Primera División RFEF	7	1	—		—		—		7	1
Sevilla Atlético	2022–23	Segunda Federación	25	8	—		—		—		25	8
Sevilla Atlético	2023–24	Segunda Federación	15	11	—		—		—		15	11
Sevilla Atlético	Total		72	24	—		—		—		72	24
Sevilla	2023–24	La Liga	14	4	2	2	0	0	—		16	6
Sevilla	2024–25	La Liga	31	4	1	1	—		—		32	5
Sevilla	2025–26	La Liga	29	4	2	1	—		—		31	5
Sevilla	Total		74	12	5	4	0	0	—		79	16
Career total			194	55	5	4	0	0	0	0	199	59
