= Stanis Idumbo =

Belgian footballer (born 2005)

Personal information
- Full name: Stanis Idumbo Muzambo
- Date of birth: 29 June 2005 (age 21)
- Place of birth: Melun, France
- Height: 1.70 m (5 ft 7 in)
- Positions: Attacking midfielder; left midfielder

Team information
- Current team: Monaco
- Number: 17

Youth career
- –2017: Club Brugge
- 2017–2021: Gent
- 2021–2022: Ajax

Senior career*
Years	Team	Apps	(Gls)
2022–2024	Jong Ajax	23	(3)
2024–2025	Sevilla Atlético	12	(3)
2024–2025	Sevilla	15	(1)
2025–	Monaco	13	(2)

International career^{‡}
2020	Belgium U15	3	(0)
2021–2022	Belgium U17	11	(2)
2022–2023	Belgium U18	6	(0)
2023	Belgium U19	5	(0)
2024–2026	Belgium U21	8	(1)
- * Club domestic league appearances and goals as of 22:43, 10 October 2026 (UTC) ‡ National team caps and goals as of 16:12, 30 March 2026 (UTC)

Stanis Idumbo Muzambo (born 29 June 2005) is a professional footballer who plays as an attacking midfielder or left midfielder for Ligue 1 club Monaco. Born in France, he is a youth international for Belgium.

== Early life ==
Stanis Idumbo Muzambo was born in Melun, France, but played his youth football in Belgium, between Club Brugge and KAA Gent, spending 4 years with the latter before moving to the Netherlands aged 16. He is of DR Congolese descent.

== Club career ==
Idumbo Muzambo joined the Ajax Youth Academy on the summer 2021, from Gent.

After a season with Ajax under-17s where he already played its first games with the higher age group, he started to impress with his goals and assists record in 2022–23, in the under-18 Eredivisie and the Youth League.

Idumbo Muzambo made his professional debut for Jong Ajax on 6 January 2023 in an Eerste Divisie game against FC Eindhoven.

In January 2024, he joined Sevilla Atlético on a deal until June 2028. Later that year, he featured for Sevilla, scoring his first goal in a 5–1 away defeat against Barcelona on 20 October.

On 30 August 2025, Idumbo signed a five-year contract with Monaco in Ligue 1. For his first game for his new team, he gave an assist for his teammate George Ilenikhena in a 5–2 victory over Metz. On 31 January 2026, he netted his first goal for the club in a 4–0 win over Rennes.

== International career ==
Stanis Idumbo Muzambo is a youth international with Belgium, having played the 2022 European Championship with Belgium under-17s, scoring two goals during the tournament. By 2022, he was a captain with Belgium under-18s.

He was one of the players who were called up with the DR Congo national team by head coach Sébastien Desabre for the 2027 Africa Cup of Nations qualification matches against Equatorial Guinea (24 September 2026), Zimbabwe (28 September) and the 2 friendlies against Uganda (2 and 5 October).

== Style of play ==
Mainly playing as an attacking midfielder, and sometimes as a winger, he is described as a "creative and spectacular" player.

== Career statistics ==
As of match played 15 October 2026

Appearances and goals by club, season and competition
Club	Season	League			National cup (Note: Includes Copa del Rey, Coupe de France)		Europe		Total	
Club	Season	Division	Apps	Goals	Apps	Goals	Apps	Goals	Apps	Goals
Jong Ajax	2022–23	Eerste Divisie	12	0	—		—		12	0
Jong Ajax	2023–24	Eerste Divisie	11	3	—		—		11	3
Jong Ajax	Total		23	3	0	0	0	0	23	3
Sevilla Atlético	2023–24	Segunda Federación	11	2	—		—		11	2
Sevilla Atlético	2024–25	Primera Federación	1	1	—		—		1	1
Sevilla Atlético	Total		12	3	—		—		12	3
Sevilla	2024–25	La Liga	14	1	3	0	—		17	1
Sevilla	2025–26	La Liga	1	0	—		—		1	0
Sevilla	Total		15	1	3	0	—		18	1
AS Monaco	2025–26	Ligue 1	8	1	3	0	1 (Note: Appearance in UEFA Champions League)	0	12	1
AS Monaco	2026–27	Ligue 1	5	1	0	0	3 (Note: Appearances in UEFA Conference League)	0	8	1
AS Monaco	Total		13	2	3	0	4	0	20	2
Career total			63	9	6	0	4	0	73	9
