= José María del Nido =

José María del Nido may refer to:

- José María del Nido Benavente (born 1957), president of Sevilla FC from 2002 to 2013, father of Del Nido Carrasco
- José María del Nido Carrasco (born 1978), president of Sevilla FC since 2023, son of Del Nido Benavente
