= José Castro Carmona =

Spanish businessman (born 1958)

President of Sevilla FC
- In office 9 December 2013 – 31 December 2023
- Preceded by: José María del Nido Benavente
- Succeeded by: José María del Nido Carrasco

Personal details
- Born: 20 July 1958 (age 68) Utrera, Spain

José Castro Carmona (born 20 July 1958) is a Spanish businessman. He was president of Sevilla FC from 2013 to 2023, a period in which the club won the UEFA Europa League five times.

== Biography ==
Born in Utrera in the Province of Seville, Castro made his fortune in construction. A club member since 1976, he joined the board of Sevilla FC in 1997 and became vice president two years later, under Roberto Alés and later José María del Nido Benavente.

On 9 December 2013, Castro was named as the president of Sevilla after Del Nido Benavente's resignation. Working with sporting director Monchi and manager Unai Emery, Castro's Sevilla won the UEFA Europa League in three consecutive finals of 2014, 2015 and 2016. He criticised King Felipe VI of Spain for attending the UEFA Champions League semifinals of Real Madrid and Atlético Madrid but not Sevilla's final. The club won the trophy again in 2020, and Castro said Sevilla targeted winning the Europa League while other clubs would look to qualify for the Champions League.

In 2022–23, Castro faced fan protests while Del Nido Benavente, the single largest shareholder, attempted to oust him. Despite a relegation fight and going through three managers, Castro sought to concentrate on the Europa League again, and won it for the fifth time of his mandate.

In November 2023, after the dismissal of manager José Luis Mendilibar, Del Nido Benavente tried again to oust Castro. On the last day of the calendar year, the shareholding blocs supporting both men declared in agreement that José María del Nido Carrasco, son of Del Nido Benavente and vice president to Castro, would be the new president; Castro became his vice president. The agreement dated back from 2019, as a way to minimise the influence of American investors 777 Partners.
