= Juan Carlos Álvarez (Spanish footballer) =

Spanish footballer and manager (born 1954)

Personal information
- Full name: Juan Carlos Álvarez Vega
- Date of birth: 2 May 1954 (age 72)
- Place of birth: El Entrego, Spain
- Height: 1.80 m (5 ft 11 in)
- Position: Midfielder

Youth career
- San Esteban
- Langreo

Senior career*
Years	Team	Apps	(Gls)
1971–1974	Langreo	37	(16)
1974–1976	Hércules	62	(11)
1976–1978	Valencia	45	(5)
1978–1985	Sevilla	221	(31)
1985–1987	Hércules	46	(4)
Total		411	(67)

International career
1975–1976	Spain amateur	2	(0)

Managerial career
- 1992–1993: San Roque
- 1994–1995: Sevilla B
- 1995–1996: Sevilla
- 1996: Cádiz
- 1997–1998: Sevilla
- 1998–1999: Sevilla B
- 1999–2000: Sevilla B
- 2000: Sevilla
- 2001: Castellón
- 2002–2003: Linares
- 2004: Tomelloso
- 2004: Jaén
- 2008–2011: Coria
- * Club domestic league appearances and goals

Juan Carlos Álvarez Vega (born 2 May 1954) is a Spanish former professional footballer who played as a midfielder. He was also a manager.
