= Luis Cuervas =

Spanish businessman and sports leader (1932–2002)

President of Sevilla FC
- In office 14 October 1986 – 19 September 1990
- Preceded by: Gabriel Rojas
- Succeeded by: José María Cruz

President of Sevilla FC
- In office 29 October 1990 – 5 August 1995
- Preceded by: José María Cruz
- Succeeded by: José María del Nido Benavente

Personal details
- Born: Luis Cuervas Vilches; 5 May 1932 Seville, Andalusia, Spain
- Died: 4 November 2002 (aged 70) Seville, Andalusia, Spain

Luis Cuervas Vilches (5 May 1932 – 4 November 2002) was a Spanish businessman and sports leader, who served as the president of Sevilla FC for nine years, from 1986 until 1995. The highlight of his presidency was the signing of Argentine footballer Diego Maradona in 1992.

== Sporting career ==
Born on 5 May 1932 in Seville, Andalusia, Cuervas stood out as a skilled businessman, joining Sevilla FC as a director during the presidency of José Ramón Cisneros, where he rose through ranks until becoming the club's vice president under Eugenio Montes.

=== President of Sevilla FC ===
Following Gabriel Rojas' resignation in June 1986, Sevilla FC entered an election period in which Cuervas and Rafael Carrión vied for the presidency, and when the latter pulled out in October, Cuervas was elected as the new president of the club, a position that he held for 9 years, from October 1986 until August 1995, except for a one-month break between September and October 1990, when José María Cruz held the post. His first board, which included some future presidents, such as Cruz and José María del Nido Benavente, ceased to exist four years later, on 19 September 1990, due to the end of its mandate, being replaced by Cruz, but in the following month, in October, Cuervas was re-elected in circumstances similar to the previous elections, which means that he remains one of only three people to have held the club's presidency twice, the other two being Ramón Sánchez-Pizjuán and Nido. He is also the fourth president who has held the position for the longest time in Sevilla's history, after Pizjuán, Montes, and Nido.

Following his first election, the Sevillian journalist José Antonio Blázquez praised him in an ABC column, describing him as "ambitious, whole, a fighter and a potential winner, and likewise, in his first home match, Sevilla defeated Atlético de Madrid 3–0. In August 1992, following a match against Real Betis in a Ramón Sánchez Pizjuán Stadium packed with millions of tourists who were visiting the Seville Expo of 1992, Cuervas made fun of Betis in some statements to a national sports newspaper, to which the Betis president, Manuel Ruiz de Lopera, replied with a negative review of Cuervas' management in his club, and went as far as to state that he might even "file for bankruptcy very soon, and I say this as a financier, who receives information". Coincidentally, Cuervas and Lopera had been raised in the same neighborhood, El Fontanal, and even played with each other as kids.

The key aspects of his tenure were not only the transformation of Sevilla FC into a sports public limited company in 1992, but also to address the club's financial struggles, which had been inherited from the previous administration. In May 1987, he was the author of the famous reclassification of the land surrounding the stadium by the City Council, thus securing revenue of over one billion pesetas, which allowed Sevilla to pay off its debts and attract talented players, such as Davor Šuker, Iván Zamorano, Rinat Dasayev, Diego Simeone, and later Diego Maradona, and the coaching bench was equally impressive, featuring managers such as Vicente Cantatore, the world champion Carlos Bilardo, and even a future European champion Luis Aragonés.

Despite the team consistently performing well in the league, which allowed Sevilla to participate in the UEFA Cup twice, in 1989–90 and 1994–95, the club's fans increasingly demanded further progress and higher ambitions from the club's leadership. The 1995 European campaign coincided with a crisis that saw the team relegated to the Segunda División after failing to submit the required financial guarantees to the Professional Football League on time, a misstep that ultimately forced Cuervas to resign as president, stepping down on 5 August 1995. With a demonstration that brought together 40,000 fans protesting in the streets, the club was reinstated in the top flight.

== Death ==
Cuervas died in Seville on 4 November 2002, at the age of 70, as a result of cancer. Following his death, the then Sevilla president Nido, who had been trained as a director under Cuervas, stated that his tenure was "one of the best spells" in the club's history. The way Nido ran the club was very reminiscent and similar to that of Cuervas, such as the increase of membership through flashy signings of renowned coaches.
