= José María del Nido Benavente =

Spanish lawyer and ex-convict (born 1957)

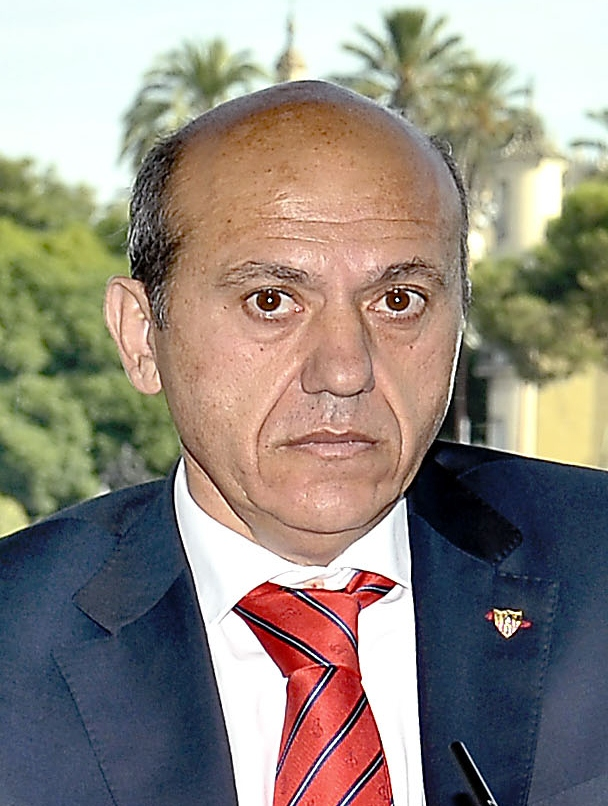

José María del Nido Benavente (born 6 August 1957) is a Spanish lawyer and businessman. He was president of Sevilla FC from 2002 to 2013, the most successful time in the club's history, winning seven trophies. He left his post after being convicted of embezzlement for his time as a lawyer for Marbella mayors Jesús Gil and Julián Muñoz, being sentenced to seven years of which three were spent in prison.

== Early life and Sevilla presidency ==
Born in Seville, Del Nido Benavente was the son of José María del Nido Borrego, who was appointed vice president of Sevilla FC in 1971. Del Nido Benavente joined the board of the club in 1986.

In August 1995, club president Luis Cuervas resigned while Sevilla was embroiled in a controversy that could have seen the club excluded from Spanish football's two professional leagues (Liga Nacional de Fútbol Profesional) for administrative reasons. Del Nido Benavente was interim president until October, and during this time the team was reinstated and the league expanded from 20 to 22 clubs as a result. The rest of the decade saw the club in financial and on-field decline, and on 27 May 2002 he was elected president with the promise to overcome a €40 million debt.

With Monchi as director of football and Joaquín Caparrós as coach, Sevilla built a team of academy players and cheap foreign imports, selling them for much larger sums. The first of these was José Antonio Reyes to Arsenal in January 2004 for €30 million, followed by the likes of Júlio Baptista, Sergio Ramos and Dani Alves. After Caparrós was replaced by Juande Ramos in 2005, the club won a series of trophies, including two consecutive UEFA Cups.

Del Nido Benavente had a highly publicised rivalry with Manuel Ruiz de Lopera, president of Seville derby rivals Real Betis. The two men ended their animosity in August 2007, after the sudden death of Sevilla player Antonio Puerta.

== Legal career and conviction ==
As a youth, Del Nido Benavente was a member of the post-Francoist party New Force, whose regional leader was his father. In 1986, Del Nido Benavente was the lawyer for the defence of Carlos de Meer, a colonel accused of planning a far-right coup with money from Muammar Gaddafi. De Meer was at first acquitted of being absent without leave through lack of evidence, but was sentenced to six months in prison by the military supreme court.

Del Nido Benavente worked as a lawyer for the municipal government of Marbella under mayors Jesús Gil and Julián Muñoz. During the investigation into the latter in the Caso Malaya, the scope widened, and Del Nido Benavente was charged in 2006 in the Caso Minutas for €6.7 million payments he received from the city hall from 1999 to 2003.

In December 2011, he was convicted as an accomplice in embezzlement and bribery committed by the city council, and was sentenced to 7 1/2 years in prison, a €2.8 million fine to be paid back to the city, and fifteen years' disqualification from office. He was acquitted of nine other charges. He appealed the judgement.

The Supreme Court of Spain upheld Del Nido Benavente's conviction in December 2013, dropping the conviction of fraud and shortening his sentence by six months. The following March, he entered the prison in Mairena del Alcor. He was freed from Huelva prison in April 2017.

== Post-conviction activities ==
Del Nido Benavente was succeeded by José Castro Carmona, who did not step down when the former left prison. In 2021, Del Nido Benavente held 24% of the shares, Castro's Sevillistas de Nervión group held 21%, and Rafael Carrión 15%. American investors 777 Partners held 13%, and shifted their support from Castro to Del Nido Benavente. His son José María del Nido Carrasco was Castro's vice president. Per a 2019 pact to limit the influence of 777 Partners, the local blocs elected Del Nido Carrasco as club president on the last day of 2023.
