= Sevilla FC =

Association football club in Spain

Sevilla
- Full name: Sevilla Fútbol Club, S.A.D.
- Nicknames: Los Nervionenses; Los Hispalenses (The Sevillians); Palanganas; Blanquirrojos (White-and-Reds); Rojiblancos (Red-and-Whites); Sevillistas (supporters)
- Founded: 25 January 1890; 136 years ago as Sevilla Foot-ball Club
- Stadium: Estadio Ramón Sánchez-Pizjuán
- Capacity: 42,714
- Owner: Sevillistas de Nervión S. A.
- President: José María del Nido Carrasco
- Head coach: Luis García Plaza
- League: La Liga
- 2025–26: La Liga, 13th of 20
- Website: sevillafc.es
Home colours	Away colours	Third colours

Sevilla Fútbol Club (Spanish pronunciation: [seˈβiʎa ˈfuðβol ˈkluβ]) is a Spanish professional football club based in Seville, Andalusia, that competes in La Liga, the top flight of Spanish football. The club was formed on 25 January 1890, making it Spain's second oldest sporting club solely devoted to football, after Recreativo de Huelva. The Scottish-born Edward Farquharson Johnston was one of Sevilla's founders, also becoming their first president. On 14 October 1905, the club's articles of association were registered in the Civil Government of Seville under the presidency of the Jerez-born José Luis Gallegos Arnosa.

Sevilla are also the most successful football club in Andalusia in terms of titles, with eighteen Andalusian Cups, one La Liga title in 1945–46, five Spanish Cup titles (1935, 1939, 1948, 2007 and 2010), one Spanish Super Cup (2007), a record seven UEFA Cups / UEFA Europa Leagues (2006, 2007, 2014, 2015, 2016, 2020, and 2023) and one UEFA Super Cup (2006). They were also designated by the International Federation of Football History & Statistics as the World's Best Club in 2006 and 2007, thus being the first club to achieve this distinction in two consecutive years.

The reserve team Sevilla Atlético, founded in 1958, currently play in Segunda Federación – Group 4. Other clubs related to Sevilla FC include their women's team. The rowing team that defends its crest in the yearly Sevilla-Betis boat race is not a section of the club but a call-up of registered-as-supporters professional rowers from the various rowing clubs of Seville.

The club's home ground is the 43,883-seat Ramón Sánchez-Pizjuán Stadium. It is located in the neighborhood of Nervión, Seville, and is named after Ramón Sánchez-Pizjuán, who was the president of Sevilla for 17 years. Sevilla has a long-standing rivalry with cross-city rival Real Betis, and matches between the pair are the Seville derby.

== History ==
=== Foundation to Civil War ===
The practice of football was introduced in Seville at the end of the 19th century by the large British expatriate population in the city, composed by owners or managers of manufacturing companies based in the capital of Andalusia. Sevilla Fútbol Club was founded on Burns Night 25 January 1890 as Sevilla Foot-ball Club (in English).

Sevilla FC was duly formed on 25 January 1890 while a group of young British, mainly Scots, along with other young men of Spanish origin, celebrated Burns Night in Seville. The club's founding document, published on the Dundee Courier's edition of 17 March 1890 describes in full detail the formation of the club and how those young founding members decided first to play under Association Rules, secondly to bear the word "football" within its name and thirdly, to elect their "office-bearers". The following paragraph is an extract of that article:

Some six weeks ago a few enthusiastic young residents of British origin met in one of the cafés for the purpose of considering a proposal that we should start an Athletic Association, the want of exercise being greatly felt by the majority of us, who are chiefly engaged in mercantile pursuits. After a deal of talk and limited consumption of small beer, the "Club de Football de Sevilla" was duly formed and office-bearers elected. It was decided we should play Association rules (...) We were about half and half Spanish and British

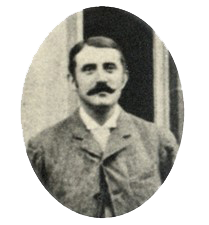
Edward F. Johnston, founder, and the first President

The club's first president was the Scot Mr. Edward Farquharson Johnston (Elgin, 14 October 1854), who was the British vice-consul in Seville and co-proprietor of the firm MacAndrews & Co., ship-owners with commercial lines between Spain and the UK, one of them being the transport of Seville oranges. Hugh MacColl, another Scottish young man (Glasgow, 9 June 1861), a marine engineer who at that time had moved to Seville to work as the technical manager of Portilla White foundry, was their first captain. One of Maccoll's partners in the Portilla White foundry in Seville, Isaias White junior, was the club's first secretary. He was the son of an English entrepreneur who founded the aforesaid company, one of the major foundries in Spain at the end of the 19th century.

To celebrate the foundation of the club, Isaias White sent a letter to Huelva Recreation Club, to invite them to play a football match in Seville. That letter was published by the Spanish newspaper La Provincia. The Huelva club accepted the invitation and the match took place on 8 March 1890, being thus the first official match ever played in Spain. Sevilla FC won that historical match 2–0, with the first goal in an official match in Spanish football history scored by the Seville team player Ritson. Isaias lived at Calle Bailen 41 in Seville (the house still exists but has since been renumbered) making this the first home of Sevilla FC.

In 1907, Sevilla Balompíe was founded, followed by Betis Football Club in 1909, Recreativo de Sevilla and Español de Sevilla. More clubs were formed as the years passed and more competitive matches were organized between the teams, although Sevilla FC, the oldest club of the city, imposed its supremacy over the other clubs in this early period.

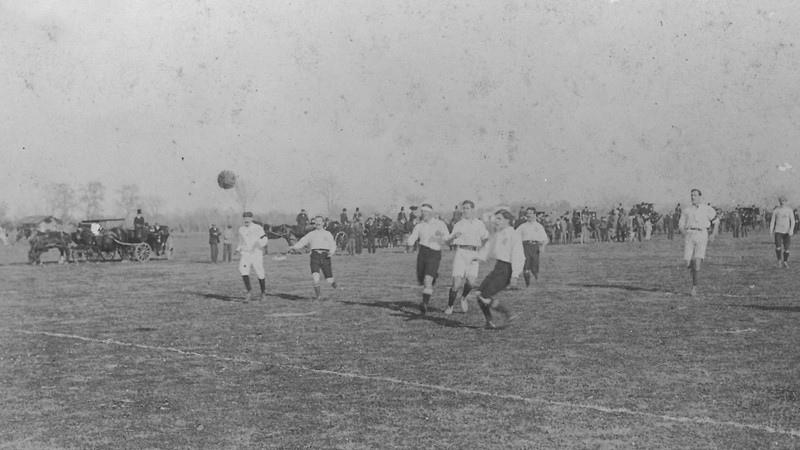
Sevilla Fútbol Club – Real Club Recreativo de Huelva (1909)

In 1912, the first Copa de Sevilla was played and won by Sevilla FC. From 1915 to 1940, the Campeonato Regional Sur (also known as the Copa Andalucía) was organized by the "Federación Sur" (Andalusian FA) and these championships included Sevilla FC, Real Betis Balompié, Recreativo de Huelva, Español de Cádiz and the sporadic participation of other clubs such as Nacional de Sevilla and Córdoba. The domination of Sevilla was so evident that of the 20 championships played, 17 were won by Sevilla FC, (the three remaining being won by Español de de Cádiz, Recreativo de Huelva and Real Betis Balompié).

In 1917, Sevilla FC participated in the "Copa de España" for the first time and became the first Andalusian team to reach the final round of the competition. In 1928, when the "Campeonato Nacional de Liga" (National League Championships) was organized, Sevilla FC was not part of the First Division due to their defeat to Racing de Santander in an elimination game that was set up to decide which of the two teams would compete in the newly formed league.

At the end of the 1933–34 season, Sevilla FC was promoted to the First Division of the "Campeonato Nacional de Liga." In 1935, they were proclaimed "Campeón de Copa" (Cup Champions) for the first time by defeating Sabadell, repeated in 1939 against Racing de Ferrol and again in 1948 against Celta de Vigo. The club participated in two other finals, but conceded defeat to Athletic Bilbao in 1955 and to Real Madrid in 1962. Sevilla FC remained in the First Division from the 1933–34 season until 1968, when they were relegated to the Second Division, a tier from which they have never further been relegated from.

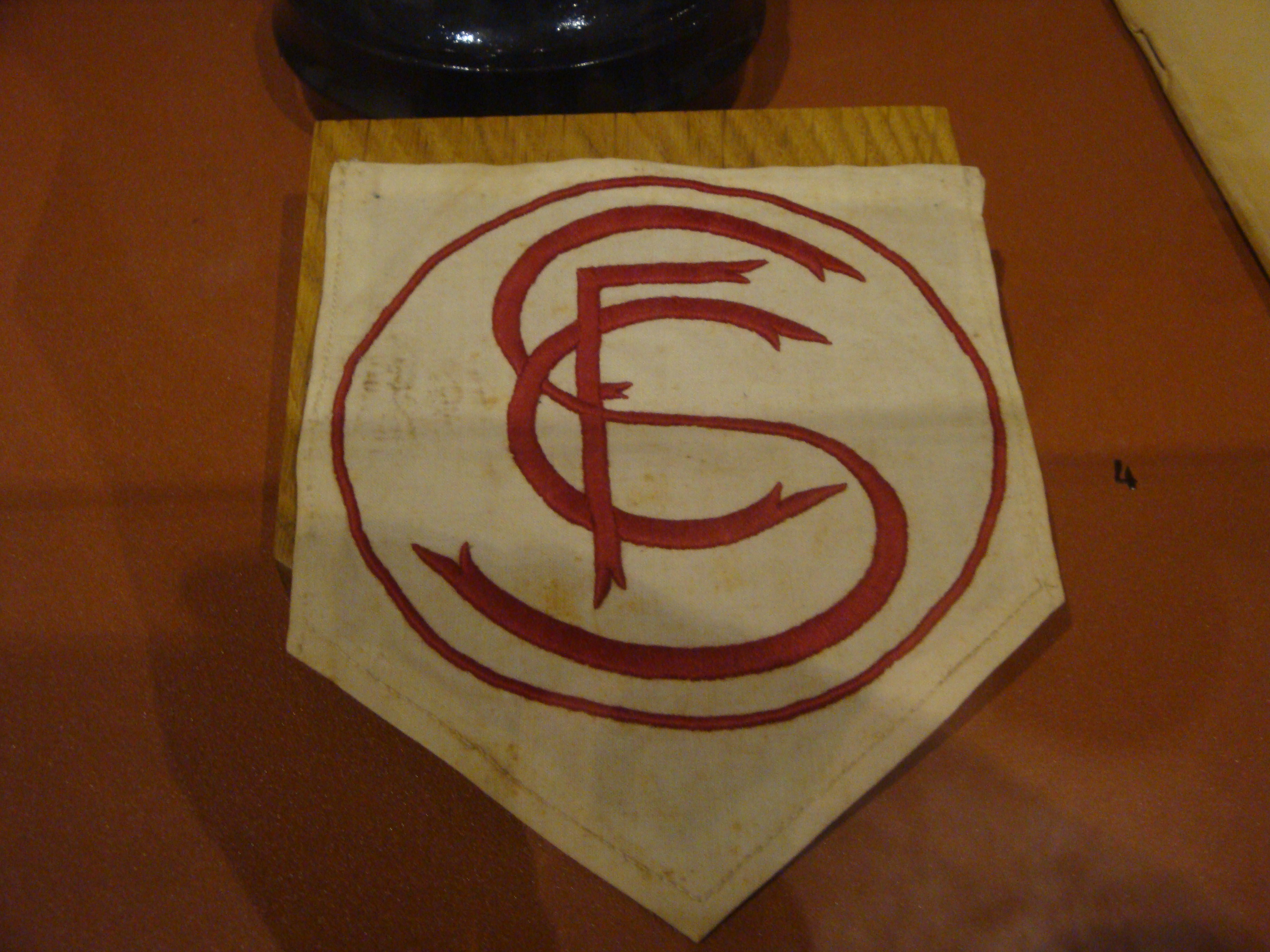
Sevilla's first crest, displayed on a former player's shirt in the club museum

The 1945–46 season was one of high importance in the history of Sevilla, as it marked the first, and to date only, time in which Sevilla FC were League champions. On four other occasions, the club was proclaimed "subcampeón de Liga" (League Runner-up: 1939–40, 1942–43, 1950–51 and 1956–57).

Including the 2021–22 season, Sevilla has participated 78 times in the First Division and 13 in the Second Division, never dropping below the Second Division. Sevilla has also participated in four European tournaments, the "Copa de Europa" (European League Winners Cup) (1957–58); Recopa (Winners Cup) (1962–63) and UEFA Cup on nine occasions (1966–67, 1970–71, 1982–83, 1983–84, 1990–91, 1995–96, 2004–05, 2005–06 and 2006–07). Sevilla also participated in the UEFA Champions League in 2007–08.

There are more than 400 individuals who currently play for the Sevilla FC organization, which includes two semi-professional teams (in Second Division A – second national category) and 12 youth teams.

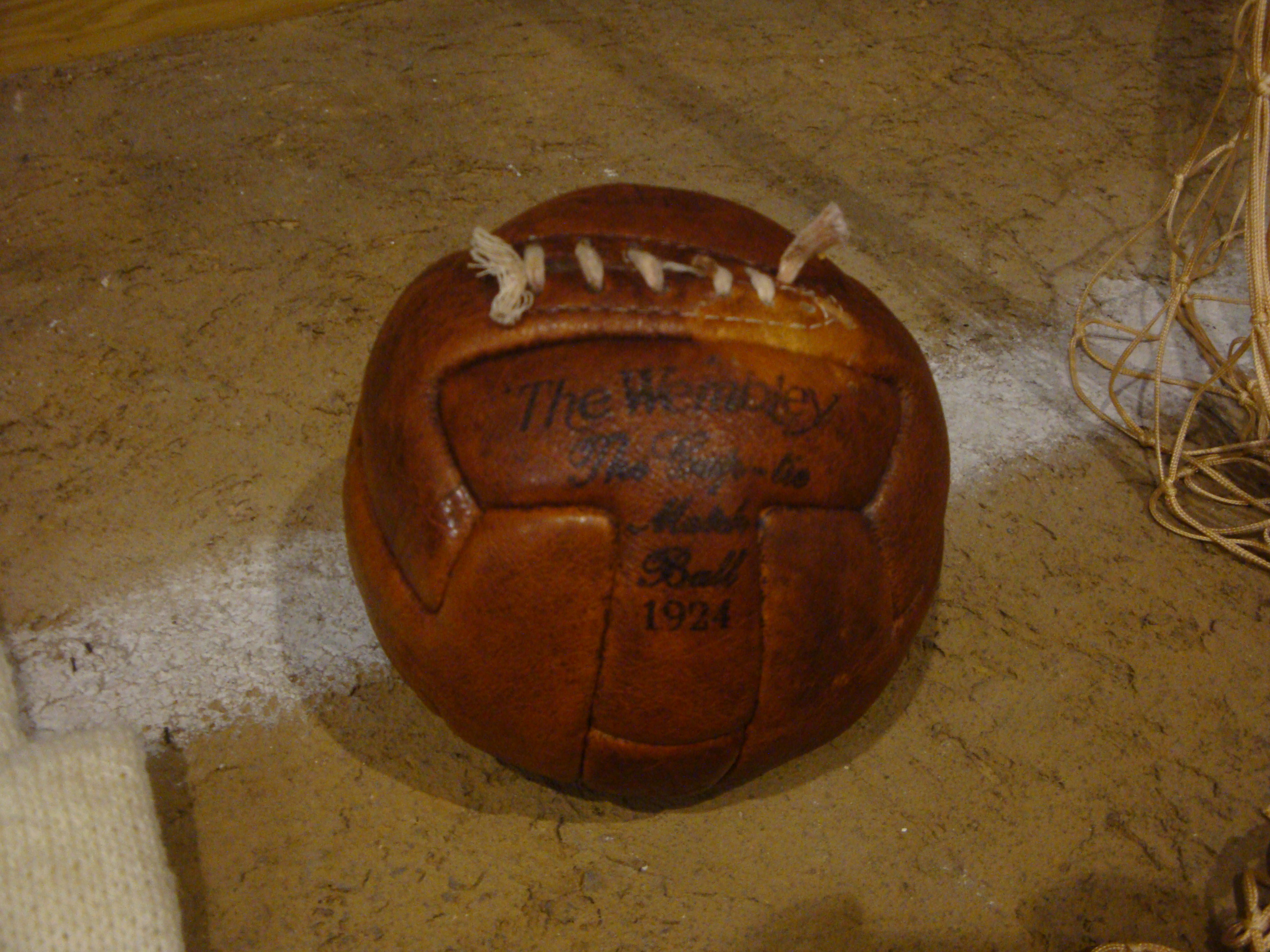
Club ball in the museum

Sevilla has always counted on having international players within its ranks to aid in the pursuit of trophies. The first of these players were Spencer and Herminio in the 1920s. Juan Arza, an international player from the 1940s, was proclaimed top scorer of the Spanish League in the 1954–55 season, with 29 goals. About 30 Sevilla players have been chosen to play for the Spain national football team over the years.

Foreign players have always played an integral part in the success of Sevilla FC with Diego Maradona representing the most well known among them during his spell with the club during the 1992–93 season. During the same season, Sevilla FC was managed by Carlos Salvador Bilardo, a world champion manager.

Historically, Sevilla FC has fielded teams in a variety of other sports including: basketball, rugby, rowing, athletics, and weightlifting or petanca. Presently, Sevilla FC counts twenty-five professional teams on its ledgers (one of these being in the second national category) and a women's football team in the Honor Division.

Sevilla FC's stadium, the Ramón Sánchez Pizjuán, was inaugurated in 1958 and is one of the largest stadiums in Spain, and has the honor of hosting a World Cup semi-final match in 1982. After its final completion, the stadium had a maximum capacity of 75,000 spectators, but since its latest remodelling, the stadium has been converted to an all-seat with a covering added to the main seating area, reducing the capacity to its current count of 45,000 spectators.

=== First successes ===
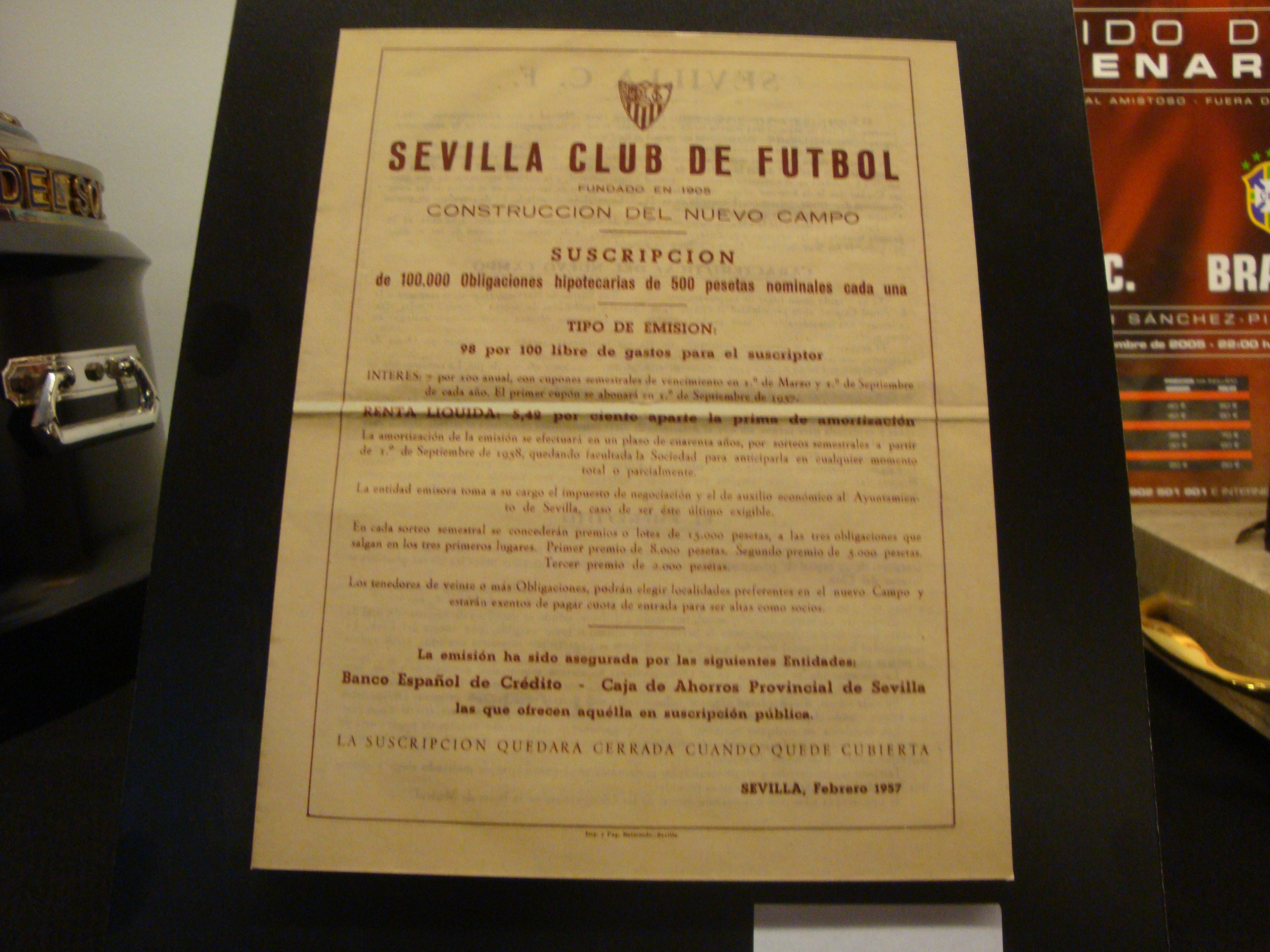
Bond issue to build the new stadium (1957)

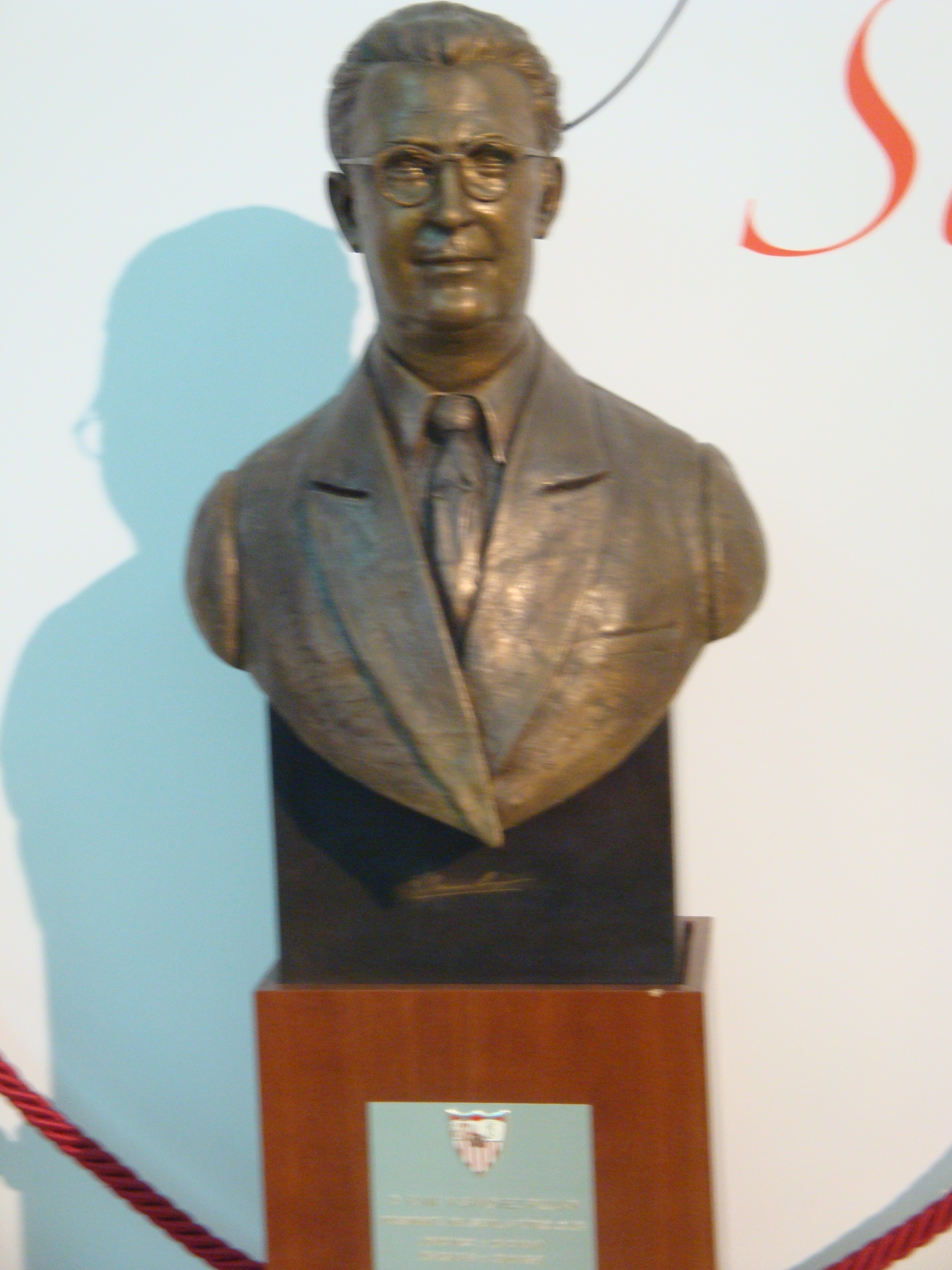
Ramón Sánchez-Pizjuán's bust placed at the stadium

Sevilla had their first spell of national success in the decade following the end of the Civil War, winning the 1945–46 La Liga title and two Copa del Rey titles. In the first season of this (1939–40), Sevilla won the cup on 25 June, beating Racing de Ferrol 6–2 in Barcelona. That same season, the side lost the Liga title on the last day to Atlético Madrid after drawing 3–3 against Hércules. The Sevilla forward line was known as los stukas after the German bomber aircraft, and scored 216 goals over four seasons. It comprised López, Torrontegui, Campanal, Raimundo, Berrocal and Pepillo.

In 1941, President Ramón Sánchez Pizjuán left the club to manage the Spanish Football Federation. After his departure, Antonio Sánchez Ramos occupied temporarily occupied the position until the permanent appointment of Jerónimo Domínguez y Pérez de Vargas, Marquess of Contadero, who was president of the club for six years until the return of Sánchez Pizjuán. Sevilla was runner-up to Athletic Bilbao in the 1942–43 season and came third a season later. Sevilla won its only Liga title in 1945–46, edging FC Barcelona by one point. Two years later, Sevilla won the 1948 Copa del Rey after beating Celta de Vigo 4–1 in Madrid on 4 July.

The most significant signing of those years was the Spanish international striker Juan Arza. There was also the debut of the Campanal's nephew, defender Campanal II, with his uncle as a trainer. During the 1950–51 season, with Campanal acting as the coach, the team finished runner-up in La Liga, two points behind Atlético Madrid. Before the 1953–54 season, Argentinean coach Helenio Herrera was hired. During his time in charge, the club came fifth in the 1953–54 season, fourth in both 1954–55 and 1955–56 and second to Real Madrid in 1956–57.

In 1954, the club put the construction of the new stadium out to tender because Nervión Stadium was becoming too small for the club's fanbase. In the 1954–55 season, Arza won the Pichichi Trophy as La Liga's top scorer, with 28 goals, and the team was runner-up in the Copa del Rey. In 1955, for the club's 50th anniversary, a triangular tournament was organized against the French club Stade de Reims and the Swedish club IFK Norrköping; Sevilla won.

On 28 October 1956, President Sánchez Pizjuán suddenly died. As an appreciation to the deceased leader under whose chairmanship Sevilla had won three Copas del Rey, the fans decided that the club's planned new stadium was to be named in his honour. In the 1956–57 season, the team were Liga runners-up behind Real Madrid, ensuring qualification for the first time to the European Cup. Herrera left the club at the end of the season. The club needed a victory on the final day of the next season to avoid relegation but reached the round of 8 of the European Cup before being knocked out by holders and eventual champions Real Madrid.

After the death of the President, Ramón de Carranza Gómez assumed the position for four years. It is said that he spoke these words at Sánchez Pizjuán's tomb:

"Dear Ramón, now your friends, among who I am honored to be one, is going to give you Christian burial, and on the following day, giving your body to the ground, we will start working and your dream that the Sevilla FC has a grand stadium will become a reality. Ramón, go in peace to heaven because your wishes will be fulfilled."

Being true to his words, Carranza made obligation bonds amounting to 50 million pesetas, and a month and a half after Sánchez Pizjuán's death, the first stone in the stadium's construction was placed. The architect was Manuel Muñoz Monasterio, co-designer of the recently built Santiago Bernabéu Stadium, the home of Real Madrid. The Ramón Sánchez Pizjuán Stadium was ultimately opened on 7 September 1958 as Sevilla played an inaugural friendly against fellow Andalusian club Real Jaén. The stadium's first official match was on the opening day of the 1958–59 season, where Sevilla beat cross-city Real Betis 4–2.

=== Crisis and stability ===
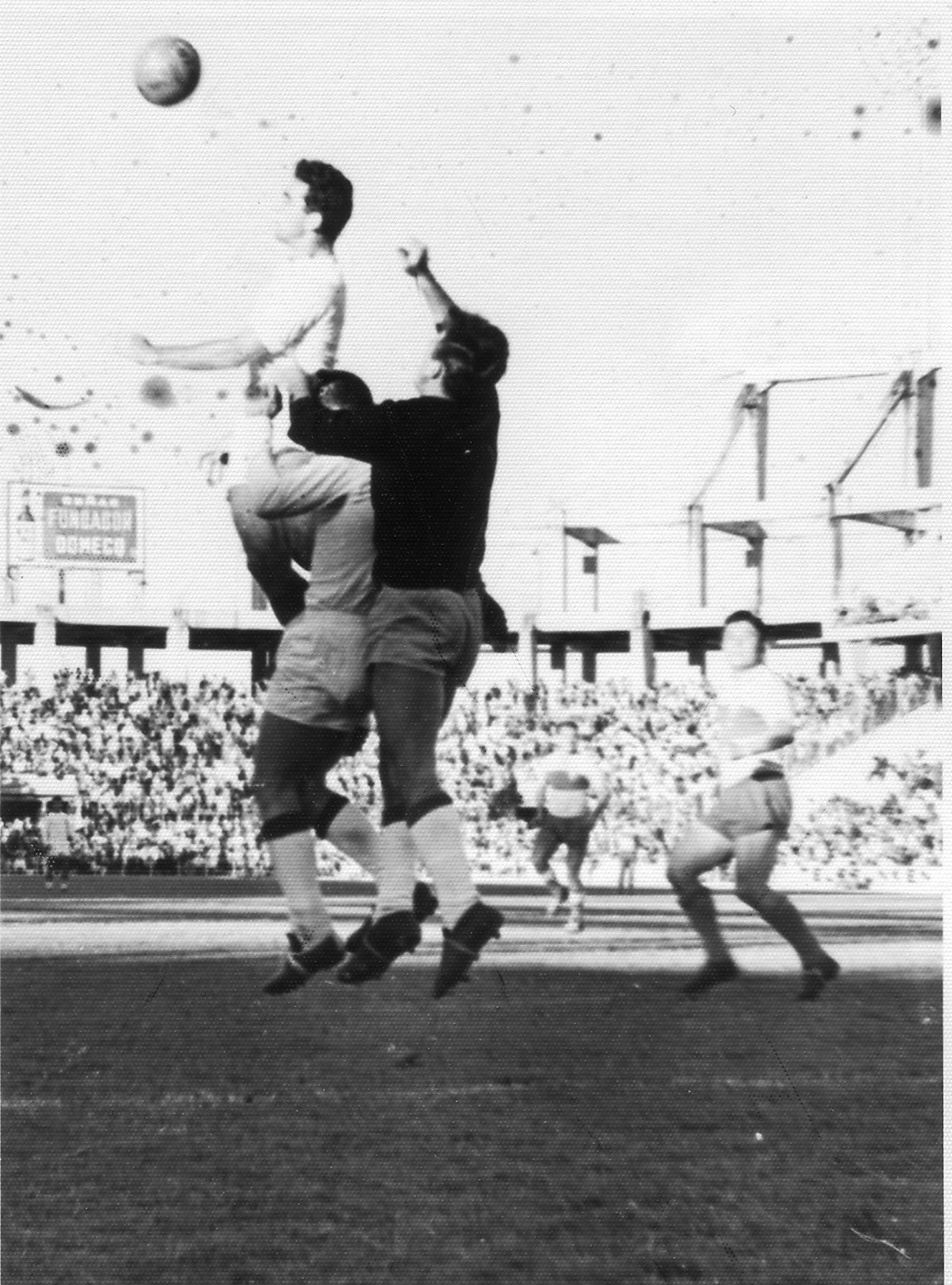
Campanal clearing a ball in the Sánchez Pizjuán Stadium on 15 November 1961

In the 1970s, Sevilla was forced into selling its top players to pay off debts incurred from the construction of its new stadium; Manuel Ruiz Sosa transferred to Atlético Madrid, Gallego to Barcelona and Juan Batista Agüero to Real Madrid. Moreover, part of the adjacent land to the stadium was also sold to a bank. In the 1967–68 season, Sevilla returned to the Second Division for the first time in 31 years but was promoted back after one season. The next season, Austrian coach Max Merkel, nicknamed "Mr. Whip" for his usage of severe and harsh discipline techniques and training, was hired.

That season, the club finished third in the league. However, the club was relegated again at the end of the 1972–73 season. In 1973, Sevilla signed their first-ever black player, Gambian winger Biri Biri, from the Danish club Boldklubben 1901. He remained at the club until 1978 and became a cult figure, with an ultra group named after him surviving to this day. In the 1974–75 season, with the Argentine Roque Olsen in charge, the club returned to the First Division. In the late 1970s, Sevilla signed Argentinians such as Héctor Scotta and Daniel Bertoni.

Directed first by Miguel Muñoz and later by Manolo Cardo, the team participated in two consecutive seasons of the UEFA Cup from 1981 to 1983. The 75th anniversary of the club was celebrated with a variety of social events and a match against the Brazilian side Santos. In 1982, the World Cup was held in Spain and Sevilla's Ramón Sánchez Pizjuán was the venue for the semi-final match between West Germany and France. In 1984, Eugenio Montes Cabeza finished his 11-year presidency and was replaced by the cattle businessman Gabriel Rojas, who as the vice-president had made several advancements to the club's stadium. In the 1985–86 season, Manolo Cardo left his management position after five years in charge, while Francisco played in the 1986 FIFA World Cup for Spain. Vicente Cantatore led the club to UEFA Cup qualification at the end of the 1989–90 season, with Austrian forward Toni Polster scoring a club-record 33 Liga goals.

In the 1992–93 season, after several months of negotiations, world-renowned Argentine Diego Maradona signed from Napoli for a fee of $7.5 million. His time at the club, however, was unsuccessful, and he was released in large part due to his periodic injuries and clashes with coach Bilardo. In the following seasons, Luis Aragonés became manager and finished the 1994–95 season with qualification to next season's UEFA Cup.

At the end of the 1994–95 season, despite the pleas of the club's directors, Sevilla, along with Celta de Vigo, were one of two clubs relegated from the top flight on reasons of administration, provoking action from fans. The action resulted in both Sevilla and Celta being reinstated to La Liga.

These events led to an institutional instability, with the season seeing four presidents and three managers take charge. Sevilla was relegated at the end of the 1996–97 season, after 22 years stayed in top division, but returned in 1999. At the beginning of the 21st century, the presidency of the club was assumed by the popular Roberto Alés. The situation of the club was very delicate at the time; the team had dropped back to the Second Division in 2000 and the squad was weakened by player retirements and the sales of key players. The club opted for a relatively unknown trainer, Joaquín Caparrós, who helped the team win the Second Division with three matches to spare in just his first season at the helm.

=== Successes in the 21st century ===
In May 2002, Roberto Alés resigned as president, and the Sevillian lawyer José María del Nido Benavente assumed the presidency. One of his first decisions was to confirm Caparrós as a coach and Monchi as sporting director.

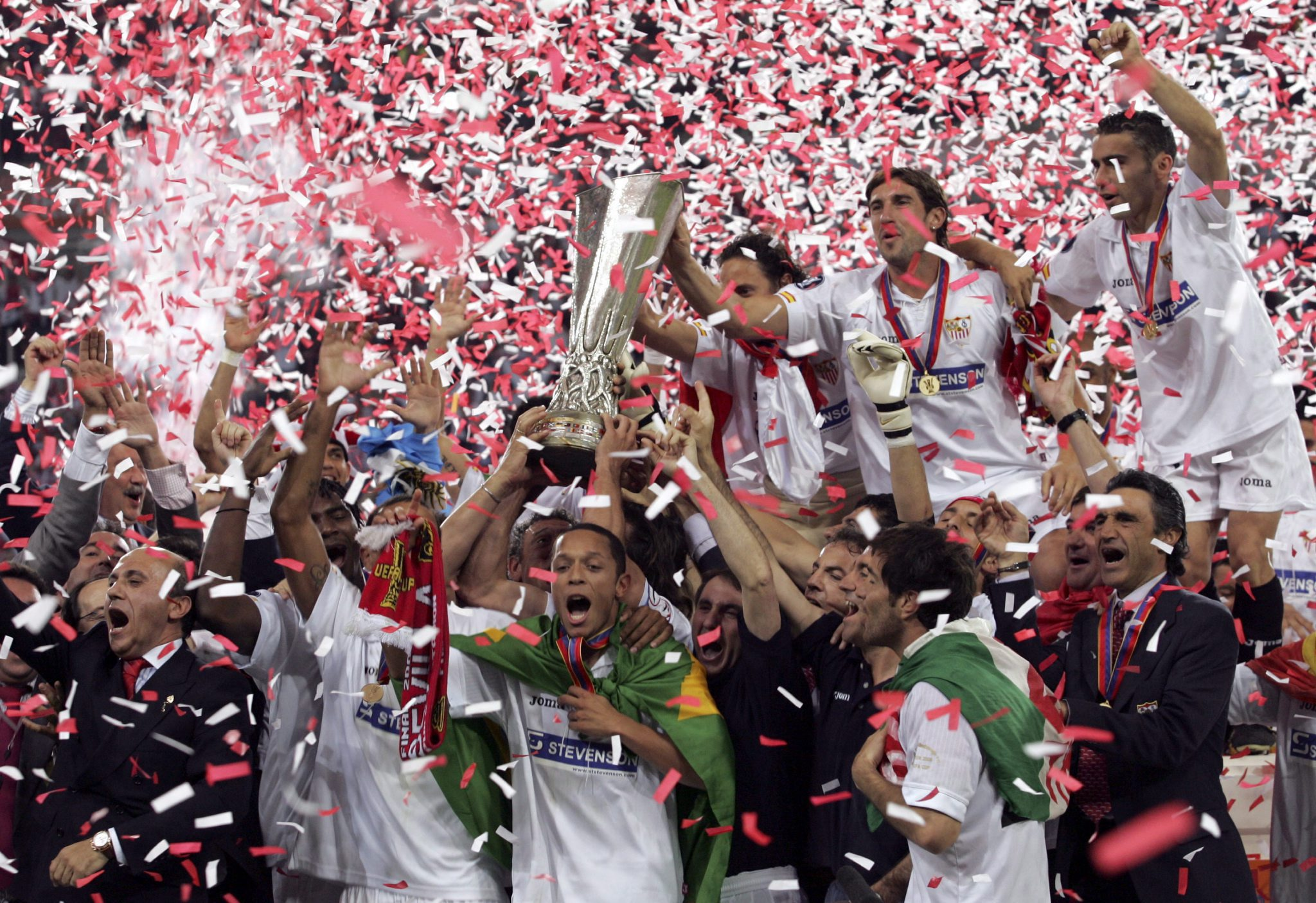
Players and staff of Sevilla celebrating the UEFA Cup victory in 2006

On 6 October 2002, before a Seville derby against Betis at the Sánchez Pizjuán, four Sevilla fans, including a minor, assaulted a security guard. The attack was punished by Sevilla being forced to play their next four home matches behind closed doors, the longest term ever given to a La Liga side. The club finished sixth in the 2003–04 La Liga, giving the club qualification for the 2004–05 UEFA Cup and marking a return to continental competition for the first time since the 1995–96 season. In the 2004–05 league season, Sevilla finished sixth and qualified for the following season's UEFA Cup, entering the competition in the third qualifying round.

This set up Sevilla's first-ever European triumph in the 2006 UEFA Cup Final at the Philips Stadion in Eindhoven on 10 May 2006. The club defeated English club Middlesbrough 4–0 under new manager Juande Ramos, with the scoring opened by Brazilian striker Luís Fabiano. In the second-half, Italian substitute Enzo Maresca scored twice to be named Man of the Match, and Malian striker Frédéric Kanouté finished the scoring, to give the club its first major title in 58 years on the season of its centenary, which was celebrated in October 2005.

Sevilla opened their 2006–07 season by winning the 2006 UEFA Super Cup on 25 August 2006 with a 3–0 victory over Champions League winners and compatriots Barcelona at the Stade Louis II in Monaco. The goals were scored by Renato, Kanouté and a late penalty by Maresca. The season ended with a second consecutive UEFA Cup win, this time against fellow Spanish club Espanyol at Hampden Park, Glasgow. The match went to penalties after finishing 2–2 after extra-time, with Sevilla goalkeeper Andrés Palop saving three of Espanyol's penalties.

Chart of Sevilla FC league performance 1929–present

On 12 November 2006, Sevilla played its 2,000th game in La Liga. Sevilla defeated Getafe in the 2007 Copa del Rey Final, with Kanouté scoring the only goal in the game's 11th minute. Sevilla finished third in that season's La Liga to qualify for the 2007–08 Champions League, returning to the competition for the first time in 50 years. As a result of these successes, Sevilla was voted as the IFFHS Team of the Year for the second consecutive season, becoming the first club to achieve this.

Sevilla won the 2007 Supercopa de España against La Liga champions Real Madrid. The season started to derail, however, after defender Antonio Puerta suffered a heart attack in the first game of the season and died three days later on 28 August. Three days after his death, Sevilla then lost 3–1 to Milan in the 2007 UEFA Super Cup in Monaco. Juande Ramos, the individual largely responsible for Sevilla's recent successes, resigned as manager on 27 October to take the post with Tottenham Hotspur; he was replaced by Sevilla Atlético manager Manolo Jiménez. In spite of the personnel issues, Sevilla advanced in first place in its Champions League group ahead of Arsenal before later being eliminated in the round of 16 via penalties to Fenerbahçe of Turkey. However, they missed out on qualifying for the Champions League after finishing 5th behind Atletico Madrid only by virtue of having a worse head to head record.

In the summer of 2008, before Jiménez's debut season as first-team manager, Dani Alves and Seydou Keita were both sold to Barcelona, while Christian Poulsen left for Juventus. Sevilla finished third in La Liga with a club record-equalling 21 victories and a club record number of away victories.

The 2009–10 season saw a second-consecutive qualification to the Champions League. On 19 May 2010, Sevilla defeated Atlético Madrid 2–0 in the 2010 Copa del Rey Final at Camp Nou, with goals from Diego Capel and Jesús Navas. Before the 2010–11 league season started, Sevilla lost to Barcelona 5–3 on aggregate in the Supercopa and were eliminated in the Champions League playoffs by Portuguese club Braga.

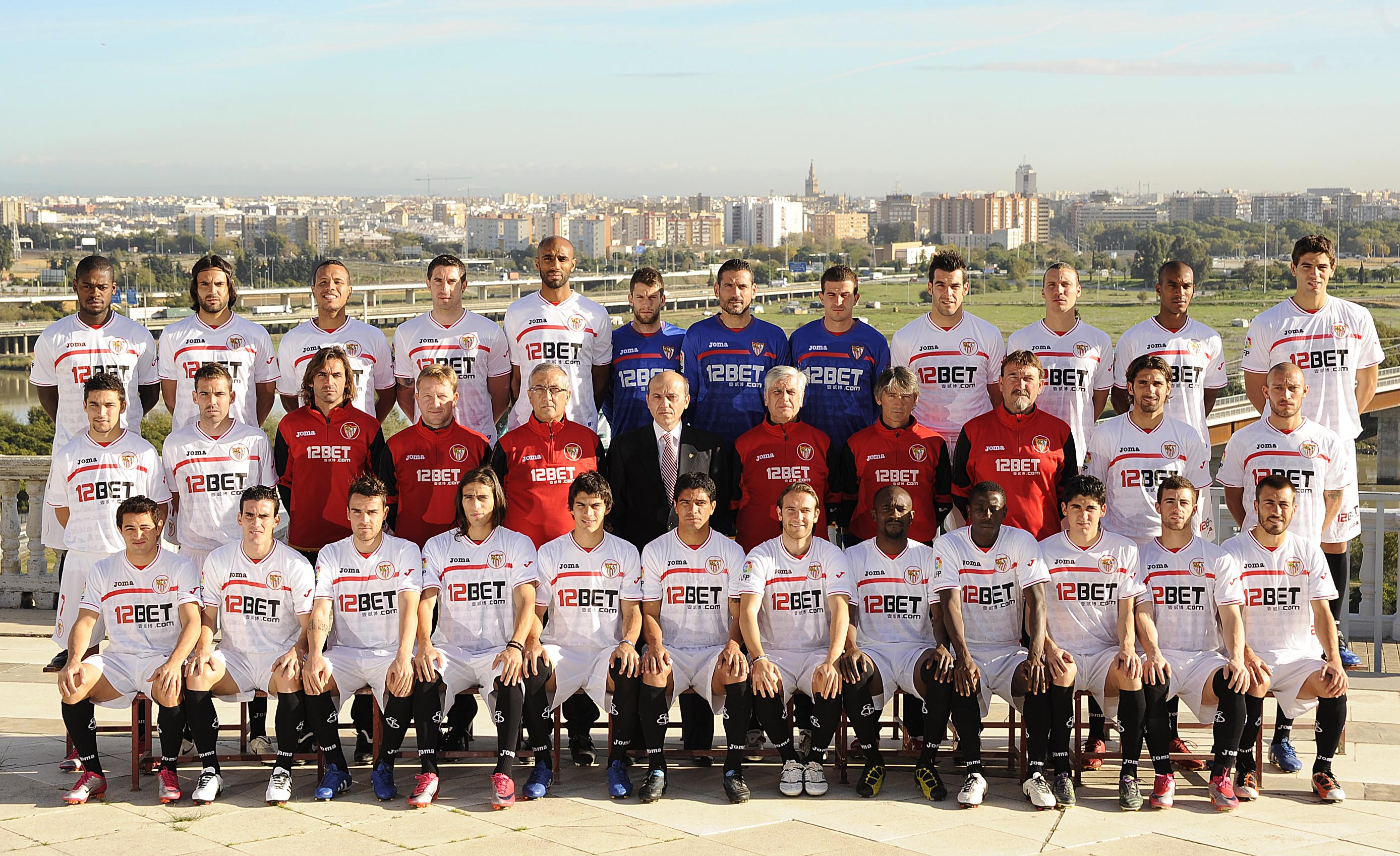
The squad in 2010

=== Unai Emery era ===
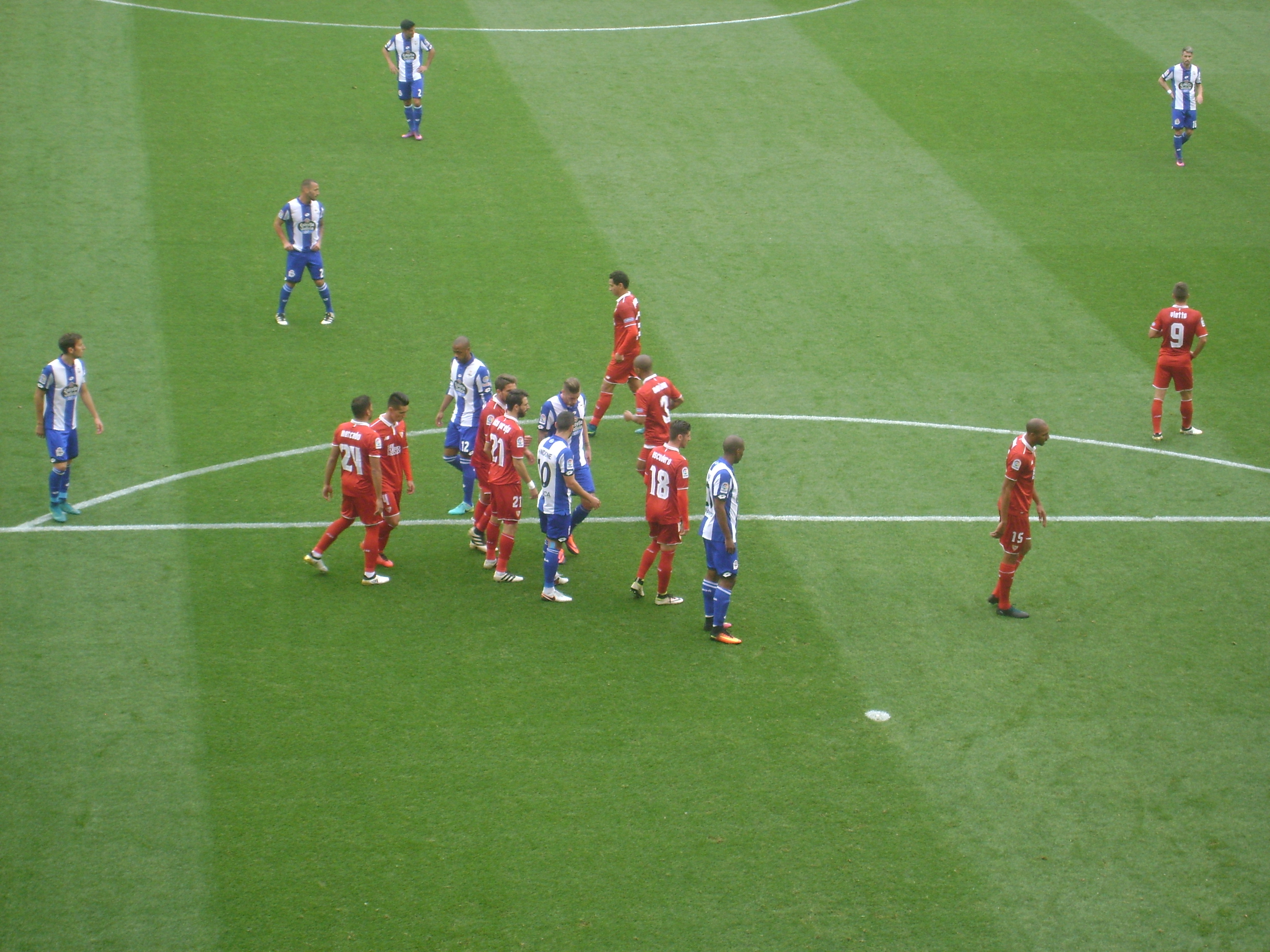
Deportivo de La Coruña vs. Sevilla FC.

On 14 January of the following year, after a 0–2 away loss to Valencia that left the Andalusians in 12th place, Jiménez was relieved of his duties, and was replaced by Spanish manager Unai Emery. The club went through an organizational financial crisis and was forced to sell team stars Álvaro Negredo and Jesús Navas, transactions that gave the club a combined €40 million; the duo was replaced by a contingent of younger players including strikers Carlos Bacca and Kevin Gameiro.

On 14 May 2014, Sevilla defeated Benfica on penalties in the 2014 UEFA Europa League Final to claim their third triumph in the competition. After this season key midfielder Ivan Rakitić was sold to Barcelona for around €16 million (the deal was closed on 16 June 2014). In summer 2015 top scorer Carlos Bacca, who had only joined two years previous, moved to Milan for €30 million. Despite these exits, the club acquired players Grzegorz Krychowiak and Éver Banega to reinforce the squad.

On 27 May 2015, Sevilla were again Europa League champions after defeating Ukrainian club Dnipro Dnipropetrovsk 3–2 in the 2015 Final. The goals for Sevilla were scored by Grzegorz Krychowiak and a brace from Carlos Bacca. By defeating Dnipro, they became the only club to have won the Europa League four times.

The club returned to the Europa League final for a third consecutive time, facing Liverpool in the 2016 Final. After being down 0–1 at half-time, Sevilla bounced back in the second half to eventually win 3–1, with one goal scored from Kevin Gameiro and two from club captain Coke. With its third consecutive Europa League title, Sevilla improved its record of most Europa League titles won, having lifted the trophy five times in the span of ten years.

=== Post-Emery era ===
Despite Sevilla's continued success in the Europa League, the 2015–16 season proved to be another finish outside the top four, the side finishing in seventh. In response, Castro decided to engineer a resurrection of the club. Jorge Sampaoli was hired as manager – replacing Paris Saint-Germain-bound Unai Emery – and the club began to invest heavily that summer. Additions to the side included goalkeeper Salvatore Sirigu on loan, playmaker Ganso, forward Luciano Vietto and Wissam Ben Yedder, attacker Franco Vázquez, wide midfielders Hiroshi Kiyotake and Pablo Sarabia, as well as former Arsenal and Manchester City player Samir Nasri on loan.

In December of the 2017–18 La Liga, Vincenzo Montella was named as the third manager since Emery's departure in 2016 replacing Eduardo Berizzo. In the 2017–18 UEFA Champions League season, Sevilla progressed into the knockout stages of the competition, and defeated Manchester United in the Round of 16, reaching the round of 8 for the first time in 60 years, where they ultimately lost to Bayern Munich 2–1 on aggregate.

On 4 June 2019, Sevilla announced the signing of Julen Lopetegui as manager for the next three seasons. On 16 August 2020, Sevilla won 2–1 over Manchester United in the semi-finals of the 2019–20 UEFA Europa League, en route to lifting the trophy for a record sixth time, beating Inter Milan 3–2 in the final.

On 31 May 2023, Sevilla clinched their record-extending 7th Europa League title with a win over Roma, drawing 1–1 after extra time and beating them 4–1 on penalties.

== Board and finances ==
=== Presidency ===
Sevilla is governed by a presidential management system, but with a board of directors that discusses and approves those important decisions that must be carried out. The president is supported by a general director sometimes and a sports director.

Throughout its history, Sevilla has had 28 presidents, the first being Edward Farquharson Johnston, a Scotsman. Those who have occupied the presidency for the longest periods have been Ramón Sánchez Pizjuán, Eugenio Montes Cabezas, José María del Nido Benavente, Luis Cuervas Vilches and José Castro Carmona.

In 1992, Sevilla FC became a Sporting Limited Association, following the entry into force of the law that regulated this kind of sporting companies, and therefore the system of election of the president was amended from being elected by the members to be elected by the shareholders of the club.

=== Ownership ===
- Sevillistas de Nervion S.A. (José María del Nido Carrasco, Roberto Alés, José Castro Carmona, José Martín Baena, Francisco Guijarro, José Gómez Miñán and Sergio Ramos)
- Rafael Carrión Moreno
- 777 Partners
- Accionistas Unidos (Supporters' Trust / Minor shareholders)

== Symbols ==
=== Anthems ===
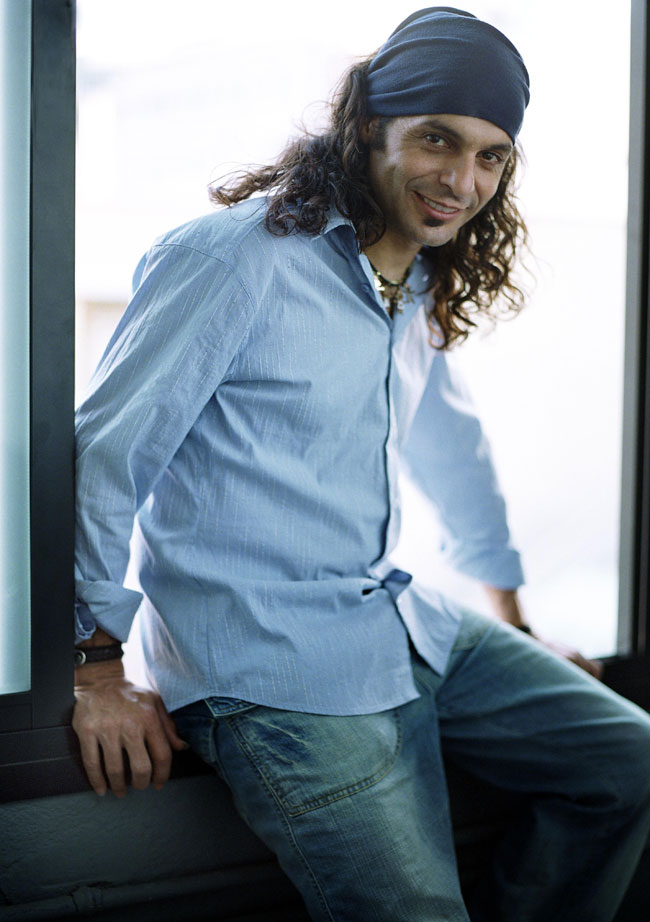
El Arrebato, author and interpreter of the Centennial Anthem

Sevilla has two official anthems:

- Official Anthem of Sevilla FC: This anthem dates back to the year 1983. The lyrics were written by Ángel Luis Osquiguilea de Roncales and the music was composed by Manuel Osquiguilea de Roncales.
- Centennial Anthem of Sevilla FC: Composed in 2005 by singer Javier Labandón 'El Arrebato' to commemorate the centenary of the registration of the club's articles of association, it became Spain's number one single and the best-selling anthem of a football club in the entire history of Spanish football, reaching the 2nd position of the best-selling albums in 2006. On 9 October 2006, in the Estadio Ramón Sánchez-Pizjuán, 'El Arrebato' was awarded the golden record his anthem.

=== Crest ===
From its foundation, the team used a double-circled crest. On the exterior circle, the name of the club and the date of its foundation were written, while in the interior circle on a white background the letters "SFC" were interlaced as they are on the current crest. This first crest was designed by Juan Lafita, who was a close associate of the club and was the son of the Sevillian painter José Lafita y Blanco.

The second crest was designed in 1922 by Pablo Rodríguez Blanco, a draftsman of the Water Company. He divided the shield in three parts and together they formed the silhouette of a heart. The three figures that appear are the Christian saints portrayed on the coat of arms of the city – Isidore of Seville, Ferdinand III of Castile and Leander of Seville. On the right side appear the initials "SFC," which were on the official shield from 1905 to 1922.

Where the three parts meet, a football of the era appears. Regarding the red and white stripes, there are various theories, but it seems that the most coherent is that from the first time, the club wished that the official kit would be red and white. Another version indicates that the lower part is inspired on the flag which King Ferdinand III of Castile carried in the reconquest of Seville in 1248.

=== Flag ===
The definition of Sevilla's flag is in the articles of association of 1982, which is a modification of the old ones which were formed and deposited in the Record of Associations and Sports Federations of the Higher Council of Sports. Its title 1, article 6 states that this is a distinctive emblem of the club:

The flag, which will be rectangular, divided by a diagonal line that goes from the lower left angle to the upper right angle, which divides it into two triangles, the superior is white and the inferior red.

=== Kit ===
Sevilla wore shirts with a sponsor logo for the first time in the 1986–87 season, to promote the Seville Expo '92. Previously, before the 1980–81 season, the club signed its first kit-manufacturer deal with the German firm Adidas. From 2022 to 2025 the kit was manufactured by Castore. In June 2025, Sevilla negotiated a ten-year kit contract with Adidas.

Years	Shirt sponsors
1986–90	Seville Expo '92
1990–94	None
1992–93	Super NES
1994–96	Marbella
1996–98	None
1998–00	SuperCable & Eurotex Pinturas
2000–02	Andalucia
2002–03	OID
2003–04	None
2004–05	La Gitana
2005–06	Stevenson
2006–09	888.com
2009–11	12bet.com
2011–12	None
2012–13	inter wetten.es
2014–15	Visit Malaysia
2016–17	SeePuertoRico.com
2017–19	Playtika
2019–21	Marathonbet
2021–22	NAGA
2022–23	Degiro
2023–24	None
2024–25	Midea

Years	Kit manufacturers
1980–85	Adidas
1985–86	Yama
1986–90	Puma
1990–92	Bukta
1992–93	Front Runner
1993–94	Hotshot
1994–01	Umbro
2001–11	Joma
2011–12	Li-Ning
2012–13	Umbro
2013–15	Warrior
2015–18	New Balance
2018–22	Nike
2022–25	Castore
2025–	Adidas

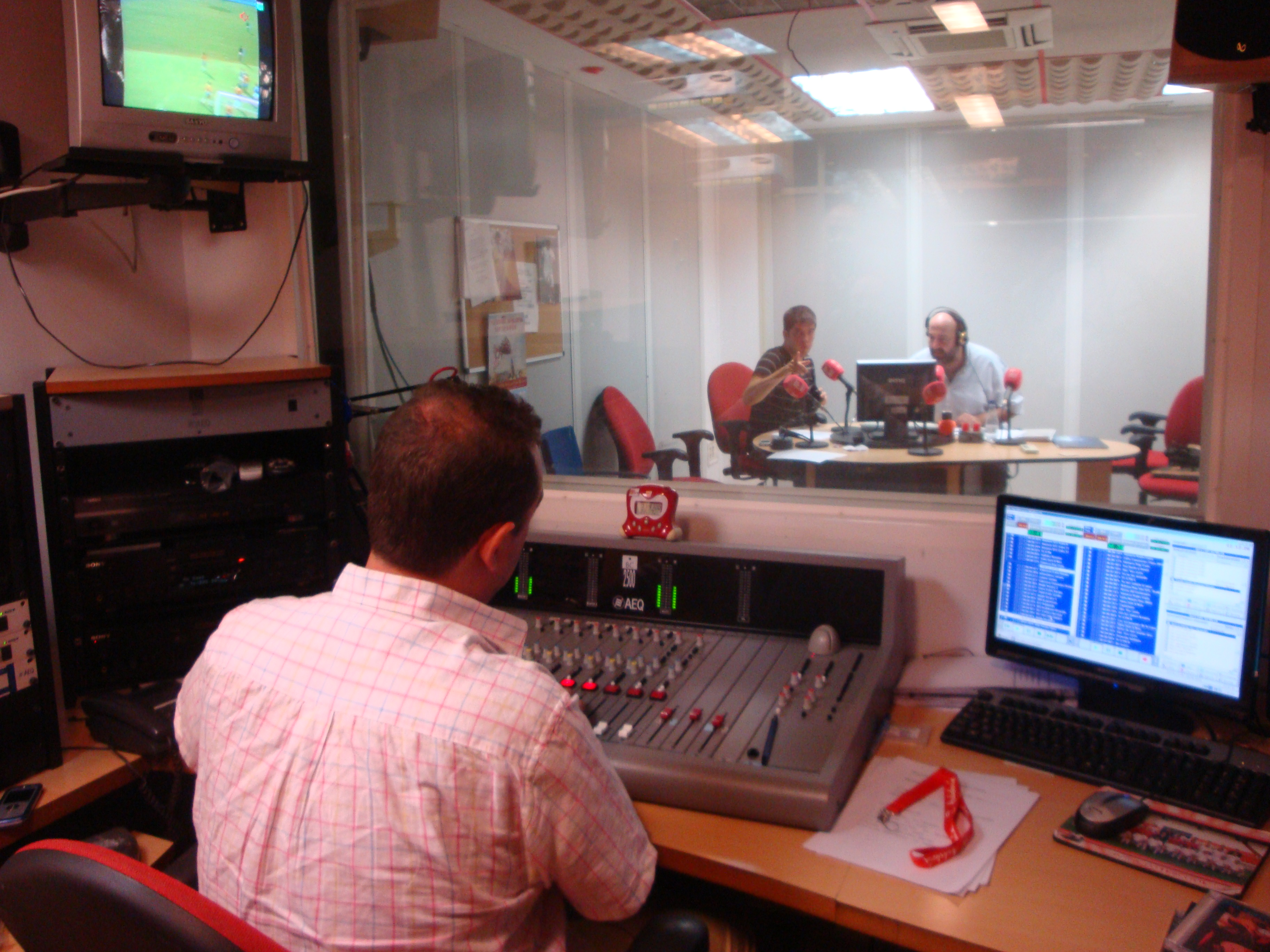
SFC Radio studio in the Sánchez Pizjuán Stadium

=== Media ===
Sevilla have several media outlets. Its radio station, SFC Radio, launched in September 2004, broadcasts all day on FM and online, while its television channel SFC TV aired for the first time in the 2005–06 season with a UEFA Cup match against Zenit Saint Petersburg. Since 8 June 2009, the television coverage has been shown on the club website. Sevilla issue a physical and digital newspaper the day after every match and on the same day as an important one, as well as a magazine before home games. The official magazine of the club is released every two months, the first issue being free and issued at a friendly against the Brazil national team to mark the club's centennial in September 2005.

== Players ==
=== Current squad ===
As of 13 October 2026

Note: Flags indicate national team as defined under FIFA eligibility rules; some limited exceptions apply. Players may hold more than one non-FIFA nationality.

No.	Pos.	Nation	Player
1	GK	GRE	Odysseas Vlachodimos (on loan from Newcastle)
2	DF	ESP	Juan Iglesias
3	DF	ESP	Julio Díaz
4	DF	ESP	Kike Salas (vice-captain)
5	DF	ESP	Andrés Castrín
6	MF	FRA	Lucien Agoumé (3rd captain)
7	FW	ESP	Alfon González
8	MF	GEO	Giorgi Kochorashvili
9	FW	SCO	Robbie Ure
10	MF	ESP	Peque Fernández
11	FW	SUI	Rubén Vargas
12	DF	SEN	Arouna Sangante
13	GK	ESP	Fran González

No.	Pos.	Nation	Player
14	MF	ESP	Manu Bueno
15	DF	POR	Fábio Cardoso
16	FW	ESP	Isaac Romero
17	DF	CHI	Gabriel Suazo (captain)
18	MF	ESP	Jon Guridi
19	FW	BEL	Lucas Stassin (on loan from Saint-Étienne)
20	FW	POR	Félix Correia (on loan from Lille)
21	FW	NGR	Chidera Ejuke
22	DF	ESP	José Ángel Carmona
23	DF	BRA	Marcão (4th captain)
24	MF	FRA	Youssouf Fofana (on loan from Milan)
30	FW	ESP	Miguel Sierra
33	GK	ESP	Rafa Romero

=== Reserve squad ===
Note: Flags indicate national team as defined under FIFA eligibility rules; some limited exceptions apply. Players may hold more than one non-FIFA nationality.

No.	Pos.	Nation	Player
26	FW	ESP	Manuel Ángel
27	MF	ESP	Nico Guillén
29	MF	ESP	Jesús Cruz

No.	Pos.	Nation	Player
34	DF	ESP	Iker Muñoz
37	FW	SEN	Ibra Sow
39	MF	ESP	Edu Altozano

=== Out on loan ===
Note: Flags indicate national team as defined under FIFA eligibility rules; some limited exceptions apply. Players may hold more than one non-FIFA nationality.

No.	Pos.	Nation	Player
—	DF	ESP	Adrià Pedrosa (at Rayo Vallecano until 30 June 2027)
—	FW	ESP	Rafa Mir (at Aris until 30 June 2027)

== Current technical staff ==
As of 24 March 2026

Position	Name
Head coach	(Spain) Luis García Plaza
Assistant head coach	(Spain) Pedro Rostoll
Technical assistant	(Spain) Javi Martínez
Goalkeeping coach	(Spain) Arturo González
Fitness coach	(Spain) Félix Vicente
Physiotherapist	(Argentina) Fabio Álvarez
Analyst	(Argentina) Agustín Zalazar (Spain) Juan Antonio Guzmán (Spain) Adrián García

== Former coaches ==
See also Category:Sevilla FC managers

Dates	Name
1908–10	(Spain) Joaquín Valenzuela
1910–17	(Spain) Eugenio Eizaguirre
1917–21	(Spain) Pepe Brand
1921–23	(Spain) Arturo Ostos
1923–24	(Republic of Ireland) Charles O'Hagan
1924–27	(Spain) Ángel Villagrán
1927–30	(Hungary) Lippo Hertzka
1930–33	(Spain) José Quirante
1933–36	(Spain) Ramón Encinas
1939–41	(Spain) Pepe Brand
1941–42	(Spain) Victoriano Santos
1942	(Spain) Pepe Brand
1942–45	(Republic of Ireland) Patrick O'Connell
1945–47	(Spain) Ramón Encinas
1947–49	(Spain) Patricio Caicedo
1949–53	(Spain) Guillermo Campanal
1953–56	(Argentina) Helenio Herrera
1956–57	(Spain) Satur Grech
1957	(Spain) Guillermo Campanal
1957–58	(Spain) Diego Villalonga
1958	(Hungary) Jenő Kalmár
1958–59	(Spain) José Antonio Ipiña
1959	(Spain) Guillermo Campanal
1959	(Spain) Ramón Encinas
1959–61	(Spain) Luis Miró
1961	(Spain) Diego Villalonga
1961–63	(Spain) Antonio Barrios
1963–64	(Brazil) Otto Bumbel
1964–65	(Czechoslovak Socialist Republic) Ferdinand Daučík
1965–66	(Spain) Ignacio Eizaguirre

Dates	Name
1966	(Spain) Juan Arza
1966	(Spain) Sabino Barinaga
1967	(Spain) Juan Arza
1967–68	(Spain) Antonio Barrios
1968–69	(Spain) Juan Arza
1969–71	(Austria) Max Merkel
1971	(Spain) Diego Villalonga
1971–72	(Greece) Dan Georgiadis
1972	(England) Vic Buckingham
1972	(Spain) Diego Villalonga
1972–73	(Spain) Juan Arza
1973	(Spain) Salvador Artigas
1973	(Austria) Ernst Happel
1974–76	(Argentina) Roque Olsen
1976–79	(Spain) Luis Cid "Carriega"
1979–81	(Spain) Miguel Muñoz
1981–86	(Spain) Manolo Cardo
1986–87	(Scotland) Jock Wallace
1987–88	(Spain) Xabier Azkargorta
1989	(Argentina) Roque Olsen
1989–91	(Argentina) (Chile) Vicente Cantatore
1991–92	(Uruguay) Víctor Espárrago
1992–93	(Argentina) Carlos Bilardo
1993–95	(Spain) Luis Aragonés
1995	(Portugal) Toni
October 1995 – January 1996	(Spain) Juan Carlos Álvarez
January 1996 – June 1996	(Uruguay) Víctor Espárrago
1 July 1996 – 11 February 1997	(Spain) José Antonio Camacho
February 1997	(Argentina) Carlos Bilardo
February 1997 – October 1997	(Spain) Julián Rubio

Dates	Name
October 1997 – December 1997	(Spain) Vicente Miera
January 1998	(Spain) Juan Carlos Álvarez
January 1998 – January 1999	(Spain) Fernando Castro Santos
January 1999 – March 2000	(Spain) Marcos Alonso
March 2000 – May 2000	(Spain) Juan Carlos Álvarez
1 July 2000 – 30 June 2005	(Spain) Joaquín Caparrós
1 July 2005 – 26 October 2007	(Spain) Juande Ramos
27 October 2007 – 23 March 2010	(Spain) Manolo Jiménez
25 March 2010 – 26 September 2010	(Spain) Antonio Álvarez
27 September 2010 – 30 June 2011	(Spain) Gregorio Manzano
1 July 2011 – 6 February 2012	(Spain) Marcelino
7 February 2012 – 14 January 2013	(Spain) Míchel
14 January 2013 – 12 June 2016	(Spain) Unai Emery
27 June 2016 – 20 May 2017	(Argentina) Jorge Sampaoli
27 May 2017 – 22 December 2017	(Argentina) Eduardo Berizzo
30 December 2017 – 28 April 2018	(Italy) Vincenzo Montella
28 April 2018 – 24 May 2018	(Spain) Joaquín Caparrós
28 May 2018 – 15 March 2019	(Spain) Pablo Machín
15 March 2019 – 22 May 2019	(Spain) Joaquín Caparrós
4 June 2019 – 5 October 2022	(Spain) Julen Lopetegui
6 October 2022 – 21 March 2023	(Argentina) Jorge Sampaoli
21 March 2023 – 8 October 2023	(Spain) José Luis Mendilibar
10 October 2023 – 16 December 2023	(Uruguay) Diego Alonso
18 December 2023 – 30 June 2024	(Spain) Quique Sánchez Flores
1 July 2024 – 13 April 2025	(Spain) Xavier García Pimienta
13 April 2025 – 31 May 2025	(Spain) Joaquín Caparrós
16 June 2025 – 23 March 2026	(Argentina) Matías Almeyda
24 March 2026 –	(Spain) Luis García Plaza

== Presidents ==
Dates	Name
25 January 1890 – 14 October 1905	(Scotland) Edward Farquharson Johnston
14 October 1905 – 25 October 1908	(Spain) José Luis Gallegos
25 October 1908 – 18 December 1912	(Spain) Carlos García Martínez
18 December 1912 – 27 June 1914	(Spain) José María Miró
27 June 1914 – 23 June 1920	(Spain) Francisco Javier Alba
23 June 1920 – 15 June 1921	(Spain) Enrique Balbontín
15 June 1921 – 13 May 1922	(Spain) Jordi Graells Miró
13 May 1922 – 16 May 1923	(Spain) Carlos Piñar y Pickman
16 May 1923 – 14 June 1925	(Spain) Manuel Blasco
14 June 1925 – 16 February 1932	(Spain) Juan Domínguez Osborne
16 February 1932 – 5 December 1941	(Spain) Ramón Sánchez-Pizjuán
5 December 1941 – 7 September 1942	(Spain) Antonio Sánchez Ramos
7 September 1942 – 5 May 1948	(Spain) Jerónimo Pérez de Vargas
5 May 1948 – 28 October 1956	(Spain) Ramón Sánchez-Pizjuán
28 October 1956 – 19 July 1957	(Spain) Francisco Graciani
19 July 1957 – 19 August 1961	(Spain) Ramón de Carranza
19 August 1961 – 23 July 1963	(Spain) Guillermo Moreno
23 July 1963 – 4 May 1966	(Spain) Juan López Sánchez
4 May 1966 – 21 June 1966	(Spain) Antonio García Carranza

Dates	Name
21 June 1966 – 22 August 1968	(Spain) Manuel Zafra
22 August 1968 – 11 December 1972	(Spain) José Ramón Cisneros
11 December 1972 – 7 February 1984	(Spain) Eugenio Montes
7 February 1984 – 23 April 1984	(Spain) Rafael Carrión
23 April 1984 – 7 May 1984	(Spain) Juan Silverio
7 May 1984 – 2 June 1984	(Spain) Francisco Ramos Herrero
2 June 1984 – 29 June 1986	(Spain) Gabriel Rojas
29 June 1986 – 19 September 1990	(Spain) Luis Cuervas
19 September 1990 – 29 October 1990	(Spain) José María Cruz
29 October 1990 – 5 August 1995	(Spain) Luis Cuervas
5 August 1995 – 10 October 1995	(Spain) José María del Nido Benavente
10 October 1995 – 14 February 1996	(Spain) Francisco Escobar
14 February 1996 – 15 May 1997	(Spain) José María González
15 May 1997 – 10 February 2000	(Spain) Rafael Carrión
10 February 2000 – 27 May 2003	(Spain) Roberto Alés
27 May 2003 – 9 December 2013	(Spain) José María del Nido Benavente
9 December 2013 – 31 December 2023	(Spain) José Castro Carmona
31 December 2023 – present	(Spain) José María del Nido Carrasco

== Facilities ==
=== Stadium ===
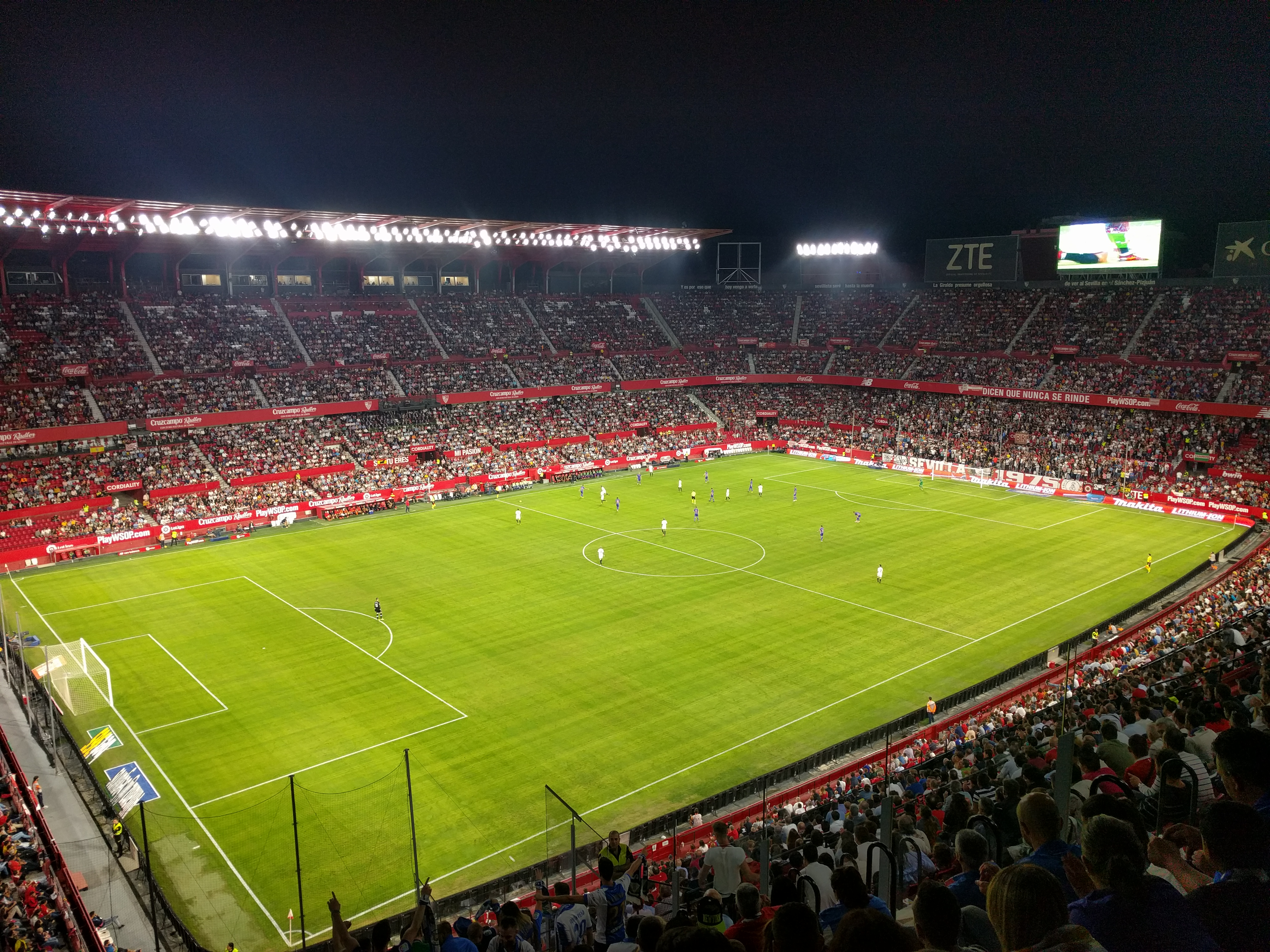
The Ramón Sánchez Pizjuán Stadium seen from inside

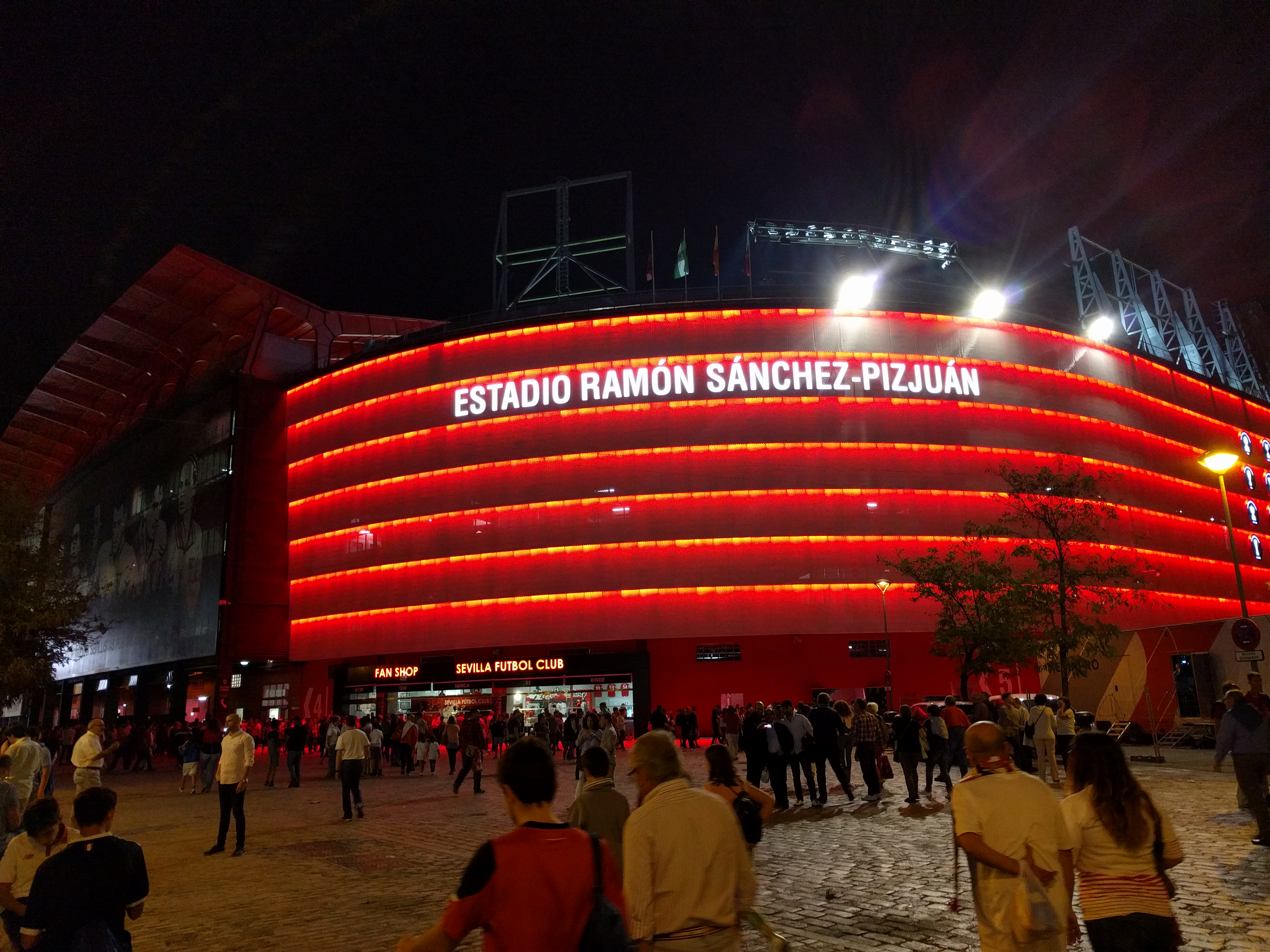
The Ramón Sánchez Pizjuán Stadium seen from outside

In their first fifty years Sevilla played their home matches in various locations around Seville: la Trinidad Field, the Mercantile Field, 'La Victoria' Stadium and the Estadio de Nervión.

The Ramón Sánchez Pizjuán Stadium was first planned in 1937 when the land was bought near to the then-home of Sevilla, in Nervión, and construction began in 1954. A contest was held for its design, won by the architect Manuel Muñoz Monasterio, who had also designed the home of Real Madrid, the Santiago Bernabéu Stadium.

The construction of the stadium was completed in the summer of 1958 and was inaugurated on 7 September of the same year with a friendly match against Real Jaén. The east and west grandstands to the stadium were finished in 1974 under the presidency of Eugenio Montes Cabezas and increased the stadium's capacity to 70,000. For the 1982 World Cup, capacity was reduced from 70,000 to 66,000, and things were added like new lighting, the visor, and the mosaic on the main façade (by Santiago del Campo). The stadium held two World Cup games; a group match between the Soviet Union and Brazil, as well as a semi-final between France and West Germany.

The 1986 European Cup Final was held in the stadium, and won by Steaua București against Barcelona. The capacity of the stadium was reduced to approximately 60,000. The last big modification was made during the mid-1990s, when according to FIFA rules, all standing areas had to be redeveloped into seating, reducing the capacity to the present 42,714.

The Spain national team have played 26 matches in the stadium since 1961, unbeaten with 21 wins and 5 draws. To mark the club's centenary in 2005, an allegorical mosaic designed by Ben Yessef was built above the southern gate, depicting the history of the city of Seville. Above it, the club's badge floated in the wind. The stadium currently houses the headquarters of the club's media, as well as an official store, club museum and trophy cabinet.

=== Training facilities ===
The sporting facilities known as La Ciudad Deportiva (The Sporting City) are used by the first team for training and by the reserve teams and women for matches. These facilities were inaugurated in 1974 and are located on the outskirts of the city on the road to Utrera. It has four natural grass pitches and three artificial pitches, as well as an artificial pitch for the Antonio Puerta Football School, changing rooms, gymnasium, press room, cafeteria, medical center and a recovering room.

== League record ==
=== Season to season ===
Season	Tier	Division	Place	Copa del Rey
1929	2	2ª	1st	Quarter-finals
1929–30	2	2ª	4th	Round of 16
1930–31	2	2ª	2nd	Round of 16
1931–32	2	2ª	8th	Round of 32
1932–33	2	2ª	9th	Round of 16
1933–34	2	2ª	1st	Round of 16
1934–35	1	1ª	5th	Winners
1935–36	1	1ª	10th	Round of 16
1939–40	1	1ª	2nd	Round of 16
1940–41	1	1ª	5th	Quarter-finals
1941–42	1	1ª	6th	Round of 16
1942–43	1	1ª	2nd	First round
1943–44	1	1ª	3rd	Quarter-finals
1944–45	1	1ª	10th	Quarter-finals
1945–46	1	1ª	1st	Semi-finals
1946–47	1	1ª	6th	Round of 16
1947–48	1	1ª	5th	Winners
1948–49	1	1ª	8th	Round of 16
1949–50	1	1ª	10th	Quarter-finals
1950–51	1	1ª	2nd	First round

Season	Tier	Division	Place	Copa del Rey
1951–52	1	1ª	6th	First round
1952–53	1	1ª	5th	Round of 16
1953–54	1	1ª	5th	Semi-finals
1954–55	1	1ª	4th	Runners-up
1955–56	1	1ª	4th	Round of 16
1956–57	1	1ª	2nd	Round of 16
1957–58	1	1ª	10th	Round of 16
1958–59	1	1ª	12th	Round of 32
1959–60	1	1ª	4th	Round of 32
1960–61	1	1ª	11th	Quarter-finals
1961–62	1	1ª	6th	Runners-up
1962–63	1	1ª	11th	Round of 16
1963–64	1	1ª	9th	Round of 16
1964–65	1	1ª	10th	Round of 32
1965–66	1	1ª	8th	Round of 32
1966–67	1	1ª	13th	Round of 16
1967–68	1	1ª	16th	Round of 16
1968–69	2	2ª	1st	
1969–70	1	1ª	3rd	Round of 32
1970–71	1	1ª	7th	Semi-finals

Season	Tier	Division	Place	Copa del Rey
1971–72	1	1ª	16th	Round of 16
1972–73	2	2ª	4th	Quarter-finals
1973–74	2	2ª	9th	Fourth round
1974–75	2	2ª	3rd	Fourth round
1975–76	1	1ª	11th	Round of 32
1976–77	1	1ª	10th	Quarter-finals
1977–78	1	1ª	8th	Round of 16
1978–79	1	1ª	11th	Semi-finals
1979–80	1	1ª	8th	Fourth round
1980–81	1	1ª	8th	Semi-finals
1981–82	1	1ª	7th	First round
1982–83	1	1ª	5th	Quarter-finals
1983–84	1	1ª	8th	Second round
1984–85	1	1ª	12th	Third round
1985–86	1	1ª	9th	Round of 16
1986–87	1	1ª	10th	Third round
1987–88	1	1ª	10th	Round of 16
1988–89	1	1ª	9th	Round of 32
1989–90	1	1ª	6th	Second round
1990–91	1	1ª	8th	Quarter-finals

Season	Tier	Division	Place	Copa del Rey
1991–92	1	1ª	12th	Quarter-finals
1992–93	1	1ª	7th	Round of 16
1993–94	1	1ª	6th	Quarter-finals
1994–95	1	1ª	5th	Fourth round
1995–96	1	1ª	12th	Quarter-finals
1996–97	1	1ª	20th	Third round
1997–98	2	2ª	7th	First round
1998–99	2	2ª	4th	Fourth round
1999–2000	1	1ª	20th	First round
2000–01	2	2ª	1st	Round of 64
2001–02	1	1ª	8th	Round of 64
2002–03	1	1ª	10th	Quarter-finals
2003–04	1	1ª	6th	Semi-finals
2004–05	1	1ª	6th	Quarter-finals
2005–06	1	1ª	5th	Round of 16
2006–07	1	1ª	3rd	Winners
2007–08	1	1ª	5th	Round of 16
2008–09	1	1ª	3rd	Semi-finals
2009–10	1	1ª	4th	Winners
2010–11	1	1ª	5th	Semi-finals

Season	Tier	Division	Place	Copa del Rey
2011–12	1	1ª	9th	Round of 16
2012–13	1	1ª	9th	Semi-finals
2013–14	1	1ª	5th	Round of 32
2014–15	1	1ª	5th	Quarter-finals
2015–16	1	1ª	7th	Runners-up
2016–17	1	1ª	4th	Round of 16
2017–18	1	1ª	7th	Runners-up
2018–19	1	1ª	6th	Quarter-finals
2019–20	1	1ª	4th	Round of 16
2020–21	1	1ª	4th	Semi-finals
2021–22	1	1ª	4th	Round of 16
2022–23	1	1ª	12th	Quarter-finals
2023–24	1	1ª	14th	Quarter-finals
2024–25	1	1ª	17th	Round of 32
2025–26	1	1ª	13th	Round of 32
2026–27	1	1ª		TBD

- 83 seasons in La Liga
- 13 seasons in Segunda División

Since the club was first promoted to La Liga in the 1934–35 season, Sevilla has played all but thirteen seasons in the first division. Sevilla won La Liga in the 1945–46 season, and finished as runners-up four times (1939–40, 1942–43, 1950–51 and 1956–57). While the club has only suffered four short-lived descents to the Segunda División, it won the second division title in 1968–69 and 2000–01.

== European competitions record ==
UEFA Super Cup
Season	Final								
2006	(Spain) Barcelona								
2007	(Italy) Milan								
2014	(Spain) R. Madrid								
2015	(Spain) Barcelona								
2016	(Spain) R. Madrid								
2020	(Germany) Bayern								
2023	(England) Man City								
European Cup / UEFA Champions League
Season	Preliminary stages				Round of 32 / Group stage	Round of 16	Quarter-finals	Semi-finals	Final
1957–58					(Portugal) Benfica	(Denmark) AGF	(Spain) R. Madrid		
2007–08				(Greece) AEK	(Czech Republic) Slavia ^{1}	(Turkey) Fenerbahçe			
2009–10					(Romania) Unirea ^{1}	(Russia) CSKA			
2010–11				(Portugal) Braga					
2015–16					(Italy) Juventus ^{1}				
2016–17					(France) Lyon ^{1}	(England) Leicester			
2017–18				(Turkey) I. Başakşehir	(Russia) Spartak ^{1}	(England) Man. United	(Germany) Bayern		
2020–21					(Russia) Krasnodar ^{1}	(Germany) Dortmund			
2021–22					(Austria) Salzburg ^{1}				
2022–23					(Germany) Dortmund ^{1}				
2023–24					(Netherlands) PSV ^{1}				
UEFA Cup Winners' Cup
Season	Preliminary stages				Round of 32	Round of 16	Quarter-finals	Semi-finals	Final
1962–63					(Scotland) Rangers				
Inter-Cities Fairs Cup / UEFA Cup / UEFA Europa League
Season	Preliminary stages				Round of 32 / Knockout round play-offs	Round of 16	Quarter-finals	Semi-finals	Final
1966–67				(Romania) Argeș					
1970–71				(Turkey) Eskişehirspor					
1982–83				(Bulgaria) Levski	(Greece) PAOK	(West Germany) Kaiserslautern			
1983–84				(Portugal) Sporting					
1990–91				(Greece) PAOK	(Soviet Union) Torpedo				
1995–96				(Bulgaria) Botev	(Greece) Olympiacos	(Spain) Barcelona			
2004–05			(Portugal) Nacional	(Russia) Zenit ^{1}	(Greece) Panathinaikos	(Italy) Parma			
2005–06			(Germany) Mainz	(Turkey) Beşiktaş ^{1}	(Russia) Lokomotiv	(France) Lille	(Russia) Zenit	(Germany) Schalke	(England) Middlesbrough
2006–07			(Greece) Atromitos	(Czech Republic) Slovan ^{1}	(Romania) Steaua	(Ukraine) Shakhtar	(England) Tottenham	(Spain) Osasuna	(Spain) Espanyol
2008–09			(Austria) Salzburg	(Italy) Sampdoria ^{1}					
2010–11				(Germany) Dortmund ^{1}	(Portugal) Porto				
2011–12			(Germany) Hannover						
2013–14		(Montenegro) Mladost	(Poland) Śląsk	(Germany) Freiburg ^{1}	(Slovenia) Maribor	(Spain) Betis	(Portugal) Porto	(Spain) Valencia	(Portugal) Benfica
2014–15				(Croatia) Rijeka ^{1}	(Germany) Mönchengladbach	(Spain) Villarreal	(Russia) Zenit	(Italy) Fiorentina	(Ukraine) Dnipro
2015–16					(Norway) Molde	(Switzerland) Basel	(Spain) Athletic	(Ukraine) Shakhtar	(England) Liverpool
2018–19	(Hungary) Újpest	(Lithuania) Žalgiris	(Czech Republic) Olomouc	(Belgium) Standard ^{1}	(Italy) Lazio	(Czech Republic) Slavia			
2019–20				(Azerbaijan) Qarabağ ^{1}	(Romania) CFR Cluj	(Italy) Roma	(England) Wolverhampton	(England) Man. United	(Italy) Inter
2021–22					(Croatia) D. Zagreb	(England) West Ham			
2022–23					(Netherlands) PSV	(Turkey) Fenerbahçe	(England) Man. United	(Italy) Juventus	(Italy) Roma
Season					Round of 32 / Knockout round play-offs	Round of 16	Quarter-finals	Semi-finals	Final

- ^{1} Group stage. Highest-ranked eliminated team in case of qualification, lowest-ranked qualified team in case of elimination.

=== UEFA club coefficient ranking ===
As of 18 May 2023

Rank	Team	Points
10	(England) Newcastle United	96.000
11	(Italy) Roma	94.000
12	(Netherlands) Ajax	89.000
13	(Spain) Sevilla	87.000
14	(Germany) Borussia Dortmund	86.000
15	(Spain) Atlético Madrid	85.000

== Honours ==
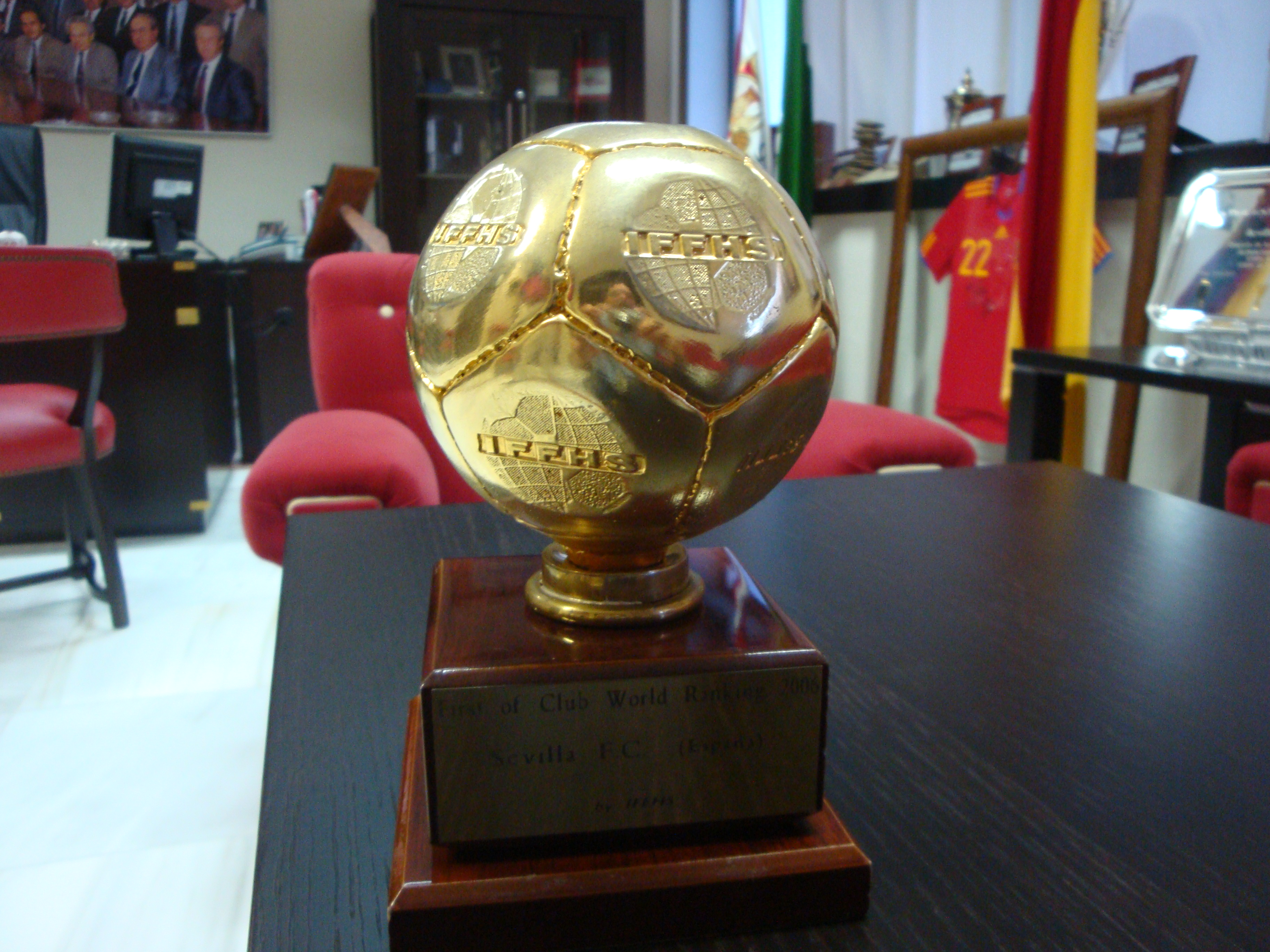
2006 IFFHS trophy as best football team in the world

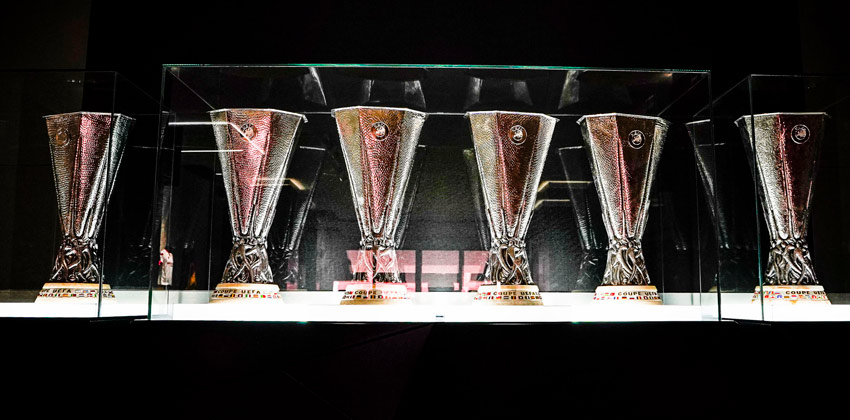
Six UEL trophies displayed at the club museum after they won the 2020 UEL final

Throughout its history, Sevilla has won trophies at the regional, national and European level – including a record seven UEFA Cup / UEFA Europa League – and is the most successful club in Andalusia. In 2010 Sevilla was given permanent possession of the Copa del Rey after their victory in the competition to celebrate Spain winning the 2010 FIFA World Cup.

Type	Competition	Titles	Seasons
Domestic	La Liga	1	1945–46
Domestic	Segunda División	4	1929, 1933–34, 1968–69, 2000–01
Domestic	Copa del Rey	5	1935, 1939, 1947–48, 2006–07, 2009–10
Domestic	Supercopa de España	1	2007
Continental	UEFA Cup/UEFA Europa League	7	2005–06, 2006–07, 2013–14, 2014–15, 2015–16, 2019–20, 2022–23
Continental	UEFA Super Cup	1	2006
Intercontinental
Intercontinental	UEFA-CONMEBOL Club Challenge	1	2023
Regional	Campeonato Regional Sur	17	1916–17, 1918–19, 1919–20, 1920–21, 1921–22, 1922–23, 1923–24, 1924–25, 1925–26, 1926–27, 1928–29, 1929–30, 1930–31, 1931–32, 1935–36, 1938–39, 1939–40

- record
- ^{s} shared record

=== Friendly tournament ===
- Antonio Puerta Trophy
  - Winners (11): 2008, 2009, 2011, 2012, 2013, 2014, 2017, 2019, 2022, 2023, 2024
- Ramón de Carranza Trophy
  - Winners (7): 1955, 1956, 1957, 2004, 2008, 2009, 2013
- Costa del Sol Trophy
  - Winners (2): 1964, 2004
- Achille & Cesare Bortolotti Trophy
  - Winners (1): 2010
- Ciudad de la Línea Trophy
  - Winners (3): 2001, 2002, 2003
- Teresa Herrera Trophy
  - Winners (4): 1946, 1954, 1960, 2011
- Colombino Trophy
  - Winners (4): 1975, 1985, 1996, 2005
- City of Seville Trophy
  - Winners (7): 1972, 1973, 1976, 1978, 1982, 1984, 1994
- Russian Railways Cup
  - Winners (1): 2008
- Trofeo de la Sal
  - Winners (1): 2010
- Antonio Camacho Memorial
  - Winners (1): 2012
- Costa Brava Trophy
  - Winners (1): 2012
- Supercopa Euroamericana
  - Winners (1): 2016

=== Other awards, records, and recognitions ===
- Medal of Andalusia (2005), issued by the Junta de Andalucía.
- Best club team of the world in 2006 and 2007 according to the International Federation of Football History & Statistics (IFFHS).
- In 2006, Best team as voted by the Federation of Sports Journalists of Andalucía.
- Prize for the best team of 2006 according to the Spanish Sports Press Association.
- In January 2007, Sevilla were awarded with the 15th Communication Award granted by the Seville Press Association.
- Royal Order of Sports Merit, granted by the Superior Council of Sports.
- Gold medal of the Royal Chamber of Commerce for economic-administrative management.
- The only team to win the UEFA Europa League three times in a row: 2013–14, 2014–15, 2015–16
Gallery
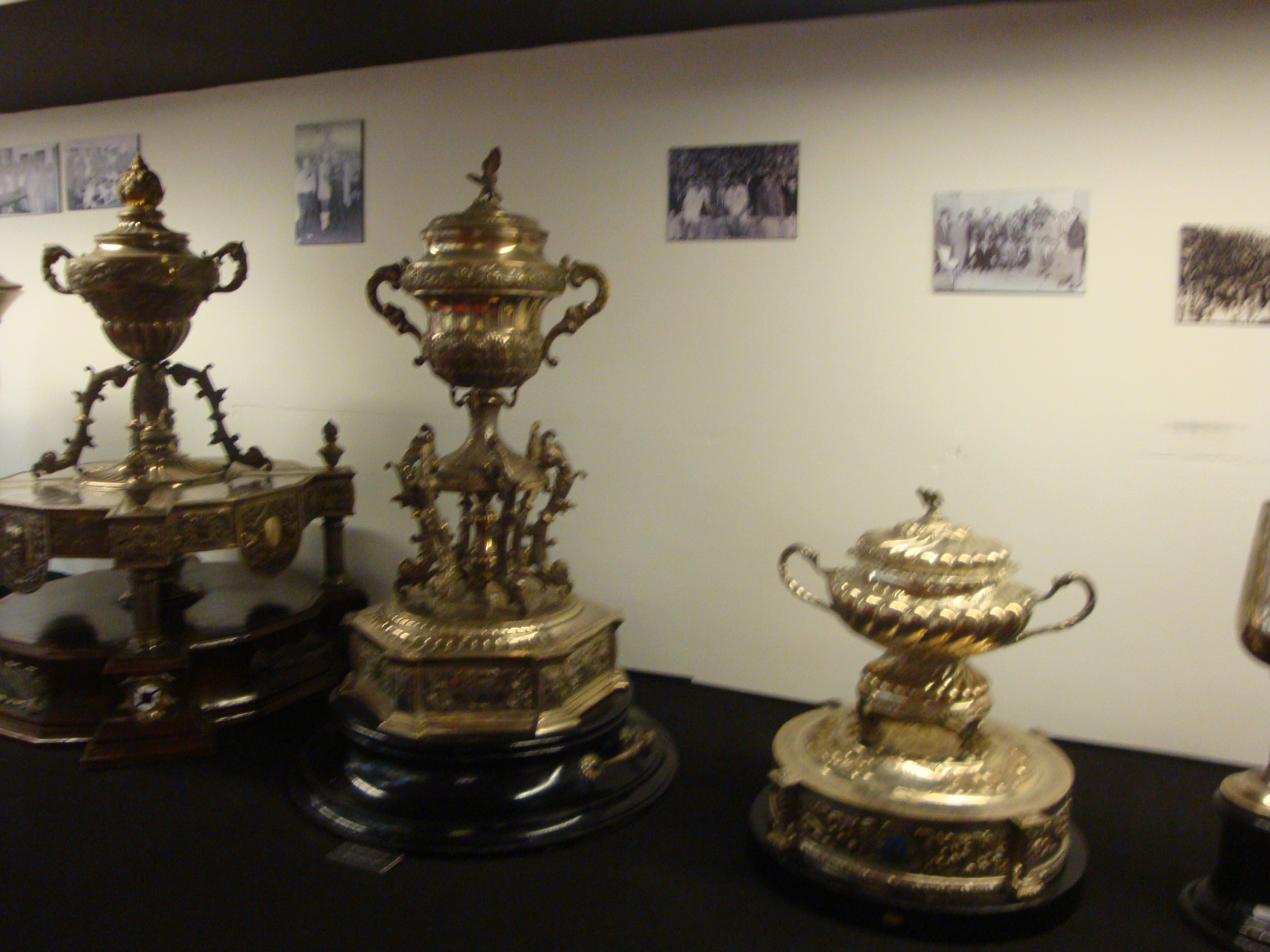
First Ramón de Carranza trophies (6)

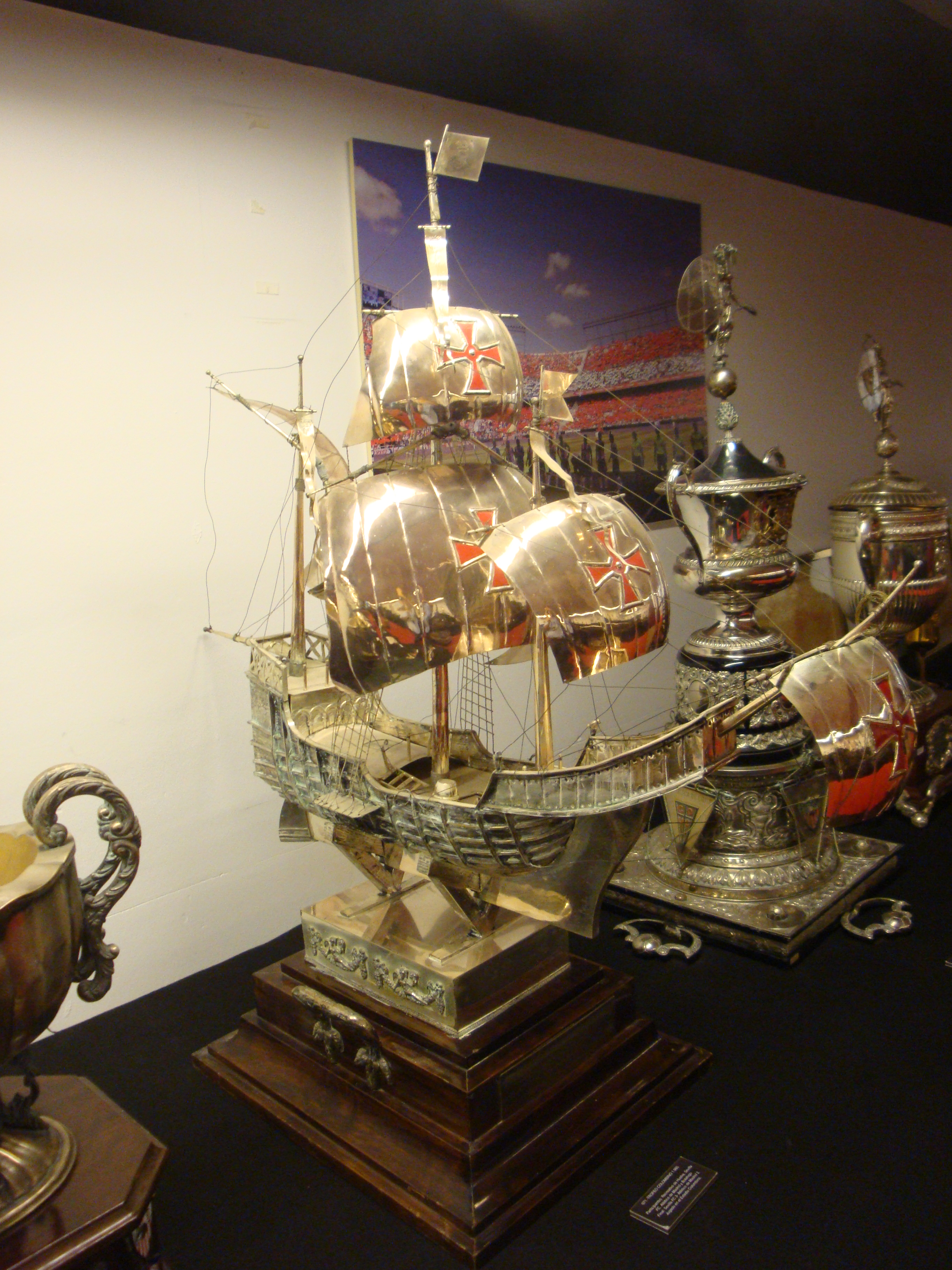
Colombino Trophy (4)

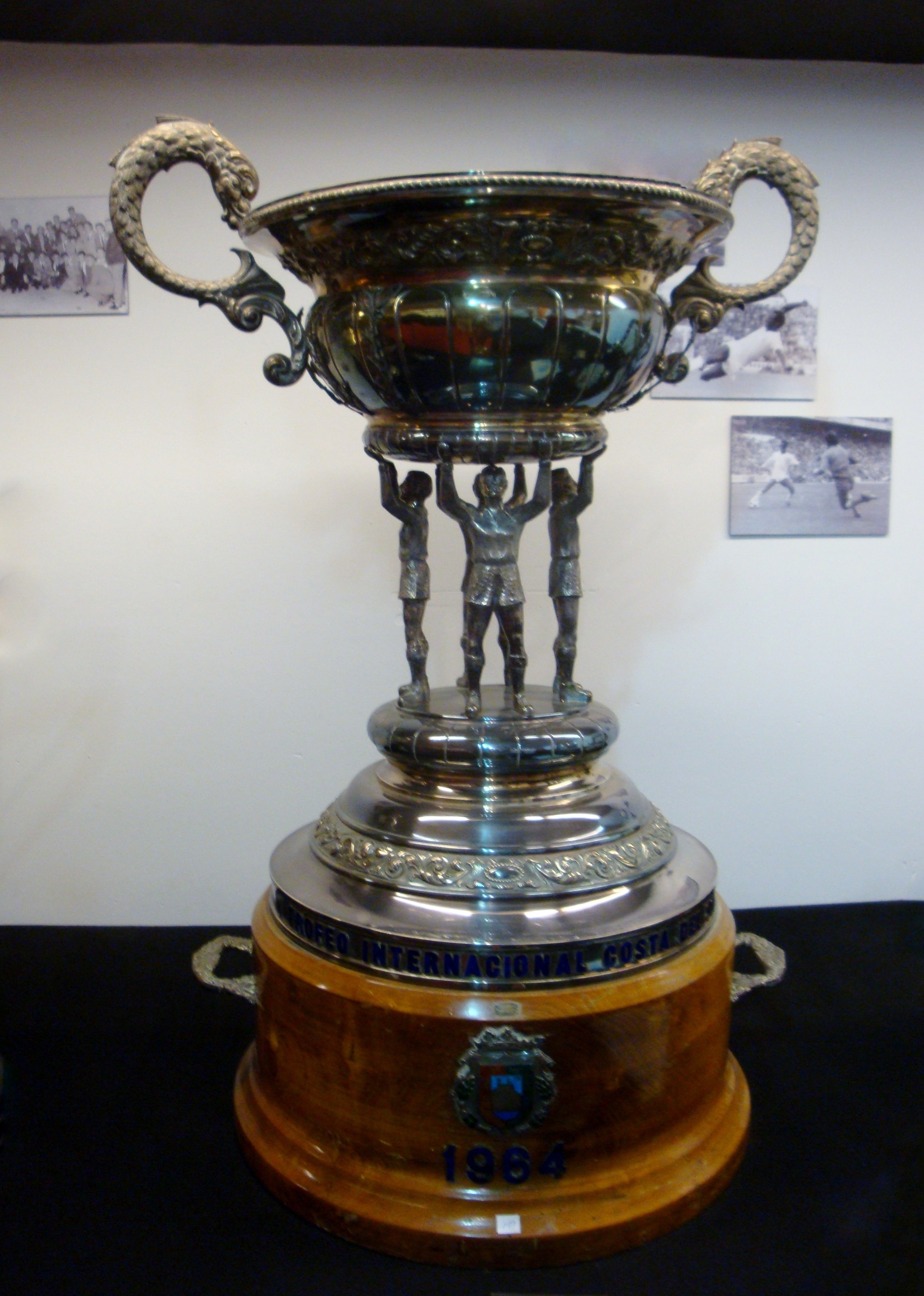
Costa del Sol Trophy (2)

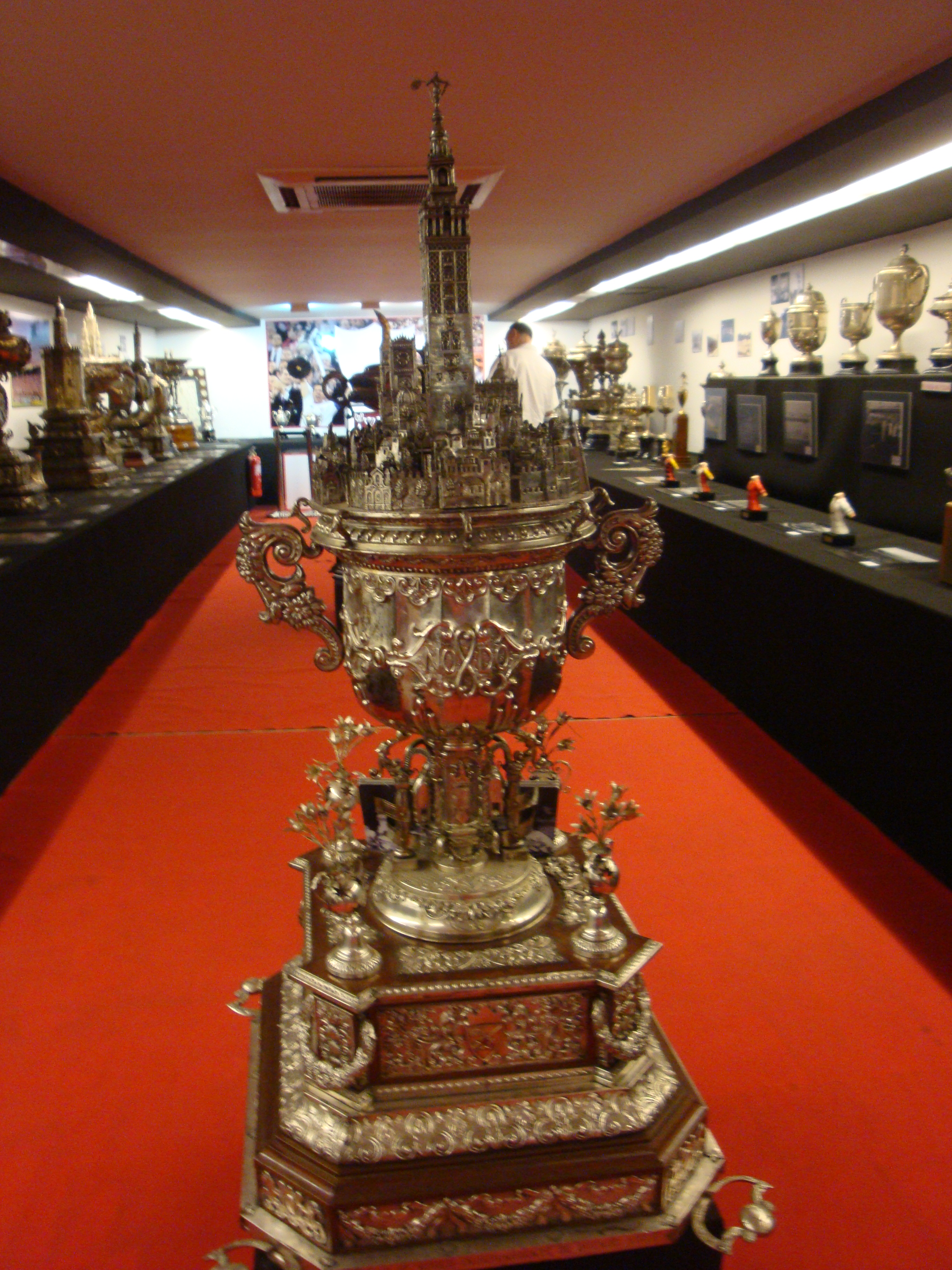
Seville City Trophy (7)

=== Individual trophies ===
- Pichichi Trophy (1):

(Spain) Juan Arza (1955)

- Zarra Trophy (2):

(Spain) Álvaro Negredo (2011), (2013)

- Zamora Trophy (1):

(Morocco) Yassine Bounou (2022)

== Team records ==
- As of 2020–21 season.

=== General information ===
Details
Concept	Times
Seasons in La Liga	77
Seasons in Segunda División	13
Promotions to La Liga	5
Participations in the Copa del Rey	89
Participations in UEFA competitions	24
All-time position in La Liga	6th
Number of international players contributed to the Spain national team	37

Updated 31 March 2020

=== Most goals scored in a league match ===
Most goals scored in a league match
Match	Result	Season
Sevilla – Barcelona	11–1	1940–41
Sevilla – Valencia	10–3	1940–41
Sevilla – Oviedo	10–0	1941–42
Celta Vigo – Sevilla	1–5	1943–44
Las Palmas – Sevilla	2–5	1985–86
Sevilla – Sporting Gijón	5–1	1994–95
Sevilla – Hércules	5–0	1996–97
Sevilla – Racing Santander	5–2	2003–04
Sevilla – Zaragoza	5–0	2007–08
Racing Santander – Sevilla	1–5	2009–10
Sevilla – Rayo Vallecano	5–2	2011–12
Sevilla – Real Betis	5–1	2012–13
Sevilla – Granada	5–1	2014–15
Sevilla – Getafe	5–0	2015–16
Sevilla – Espanyol	6–4	2016–17
Sevilla – Osasuna	5–0	2016–17
Levante – Sevilla	2–6	2018–19
Sevilla – Levante	5–0	2018–19
Sevilla – Real Sociedad	5–2	2018–19
Sevilla – Rayo Vallecano	5–0	2018–19
Sevilla – Levante	5–3	2021–22
Sevilla – Almería	5–1	2023–24

=== Most goals conceded in a league match ===
Most goals conceded in a league match
Match	Result	Season
Sevilla – Oviedo	0–5	1942–43
Sevilla – Real Madrid	0–5	1962–63
Valencia – Sevilla	8–0	1943–44
Real Madrid – Sevilla	8–0	1958–59
Espanyol – Sevilla	5–1	1986–87
Zaragoza – Sevilla	8–1	1987–88
Real Madrid – Sevilla	5–2	1989–90
Real Madrid – Sevilla	7–0	1990–91
Real Madrid – Sevilla	5–0	1992–93
Barcelona – Sevilla	5–2	1993–94
Deportivo La Coruña – Sevilla	5–1	1994–95
Deportivo La Coruña – Sevilla	5–2	1999–2000
Real Madrid – Sevilla	5–1	2003–04
Espanyol – Sevilla	5–0	2005–06
Barcelona – Sevilla	5–0	2010–11
Getafe – Sevilla	5–1	2011–12
Sevilla – Real Madrid	2–6	2010–11
Sevilla – Real Madrid	2–6	2011–12
Real Madrid – Sevilla	7–3	2013–14
Barcelona – Sevilla	5–1	2014–15
Real Madrid – Sevilla	5–0	2017–18
Eibar – Sevilla	5–1	2017–18
Sevilla – Betis	3–5	2017–18
Sevilla – Atlético Madrid	2–5	2017–18
Atlético Madrid – Sevilla	6–1	2022–23
Barcelona – Sevilla	5–1	2024–25

=== Statistics in UEFA competitions ===
The debut of Sevilla in European competitions took place in the 1957–58 season as a participant in that season's European Cup. Despite finishing runner-up in the league to Real Madrid, Sevilla represented Spain in the competition as Real had already qualified by winning the European Cup the season before.

Accurate as of 12 December 2023

Competition	Pld	W	D	L	GF	GA	GD
European Cup / UEFA Champions League	78	30	21	27	117	115	+2
UEFA Cup / UEFA Europa League	158	92	33	33	283	133	+150
UEFA Super Cup	7	1	1	5	12	17	−5
UEFA Cup Winners' Cup	2	1	0	1	2	4	−2
Inter-Cities Fairs Cup	4	1	1	2	4	7	−3
Total	249	125	56	68	418	276	+142

Pld = Matches played; W = Won; D = Drawn; L = Lost; GF = Goals for; GA = Goals against; GD = Goal difference

Most goals scored in a European competition match
Match	Result	Season
Sevilla – AGF	4–0	1957–58
Sevilla – PAOK	4–0	1982–83
Sevilla – Atromitos	4–0	2006–07
Grasshoppers – Sevilla	0–4	2006–07
Middlesbrough – Sevilla	0–4	2005–06
Rangers – Sevilla	1–4	2009–10
Sevilla – Karpaty Lviv	4–0	2010–11
Sevilla – Porto	4–1	2013–14
Sevilla – Dinamo Zagreb	4–0	2016–17
Sevilla – Standard Liège	5–1	2018–19
Sevilla – Akhisarspor	6–0	2018–19
F91 Dudelange – Sevilla	2–5	2019–20

== Player records ==
As of 22 December 2024.

Top scorers in the history of the club

Rank	Player	Goals
1	(Spain) Campanal I	226*
2	(Spain) Juan Arza	206
3	(Spain) Juan Araújo	159
4	(Mali) Frédéric Kanouté	136
5	(Brazil) Luís Fabiano	107
6	(Croatia) Davor Šuker	90
7	(Spain) Álvaro Negredo	85
8	(Paraguay) Bernardo Acosta	83
9	(Spain) Manolo Doménech	77
10	(Morocco) Youssef En-Nesyri	73

(*) 43 goals of the Campeonato Regional Sur are not counted as it is not considered an official tournament.

Most official appearances

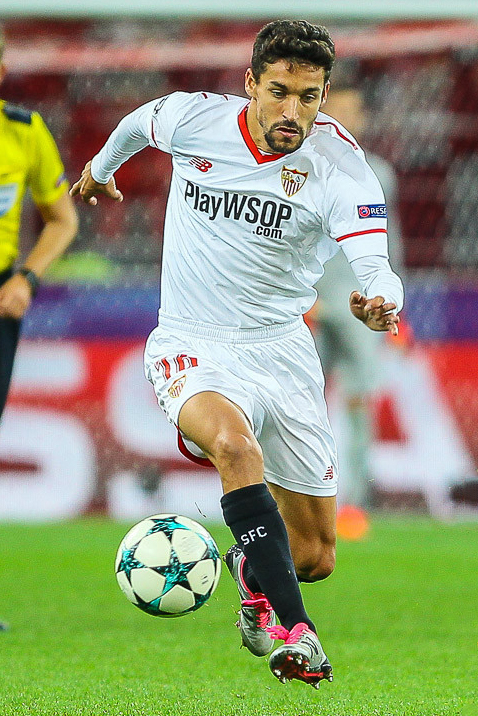
Jesús Navas has played the most matches for Sevilla in all competitions.

Rank	Player	Apps
1	(Spain) Jesús Navas	705
2	(Spain) Pablo Blanco	415
3	(Spain) Juan Arza	414
4	(Spain) Manolo Jiménez	413
5	(Spain) Campanal II	403
6	(Spain) José María Busto	401
7	(Spain) Rafa Paz	386
8	(Spain) Francisco Sanjosé	372
9	(Spain) Antonio Álvarez	370
10	(Spain) Enrique Lora	334

== Affiliated teams ==
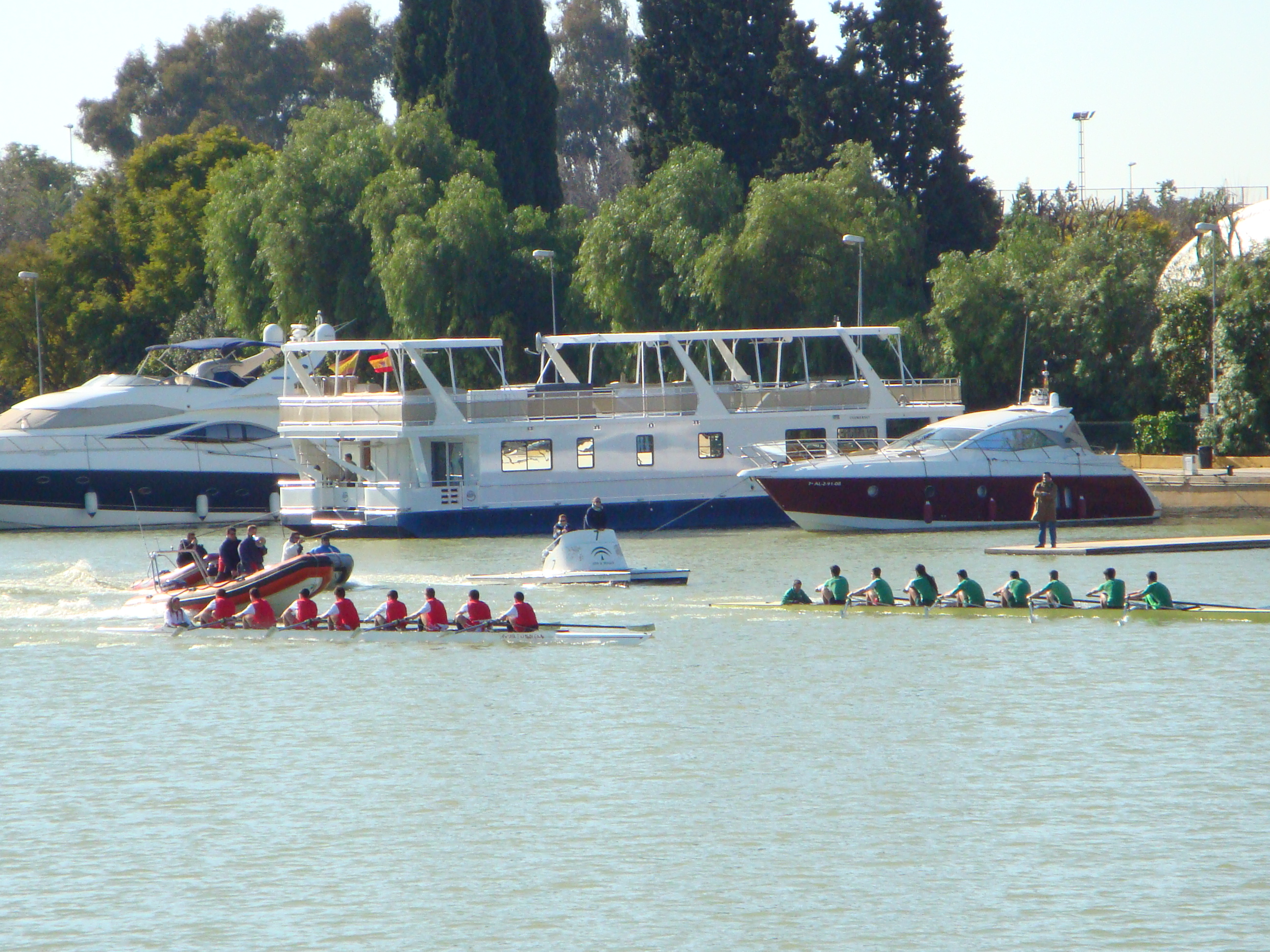
The 2009 rowing regatta between Sevilla and Real Betis in the Guadalquivir

Sevilla's B team, Sevilla Atlético, was founded in 1958 and currently plays in Segunda, the second tier of Spanish football. Graduates from it to Sevilla's first team include Sergio Ramos and Jesús Navas, members of the Spain squad which won the 2010 World Cup and UEFA Euro 2012. Sevilla FC C, founded in 2003, compete in the fourth tier of Spanish football, the Tercera División, having risen with four consecutive promotions from provincial and regional leagues.

Sevilla's women's team play in the top-flight of Spanish women's football, the Super Liga, and currently play their home games at the club's training ground, Ciudad Deportiva José Ramón Cisneros Palacios. Sevilla acquired the women's club from CD Hispalis in 2004, and the club had its greatest success in the 2005–06 season, when it came runner-up in the Super Liga and the national cup.

Since its foundation for the 2007–08 season, the Spanish indoor football league has included a Sevilla veterans' team. Sevilla FC Puerto Rico, of Juncos, is a Puerto Rican football club of the Puerto Rico Soccer League. The side affiliated to Sevilla in 2008, and share a similar badge and kit. Since 2008, Sevilla has been one of two Spanish clubs (the other being Atlético Madrid, to compete in Superleague Formula, in which cars endorsed by professional football clubs compete in races across the world.

The Sevilla-Betis regatta is an annual rowing competition in Seville's Guadalquivir river, held since 1960. Different categories of boats represent Sevilla and its cross-city rival Real Betis. Sevilla have won on 30 of the 47 regattas.

== Support ==
=== Fans ===
Since Sevilla became Sporting Limited Association, the concept of membership disappeared. Only the shareholders can take part in the decisions of the club according to the percentage of the capital they hold. The minority shareholders of the club are organised in a federation that represents them in the General Meeting of Shareholders that the club celebrates every year.

People who are traditionally referred to as members are currently fans who purchase a yearly season ticket which allows them to attend all home matches that season. Sometimes these members enjoy some specific advantages over the rest of the fans.

=== Fan clubs ===
Sevilla's fan clubs are mainly concentrated in the city of Seville, its province and the rest of Andalusia. The presence of fan clubs in other autonomous communities is greater in Catalonia and Extremadura. Most of them are integrated into the "San Fernando Fan Clubs Federation" (Federación de Peñas Sevillistas "San Fernando"), which, according to its statutes, is totally independent from the directive board of the club, having its own board and not being intervened.

=== Ultras ===
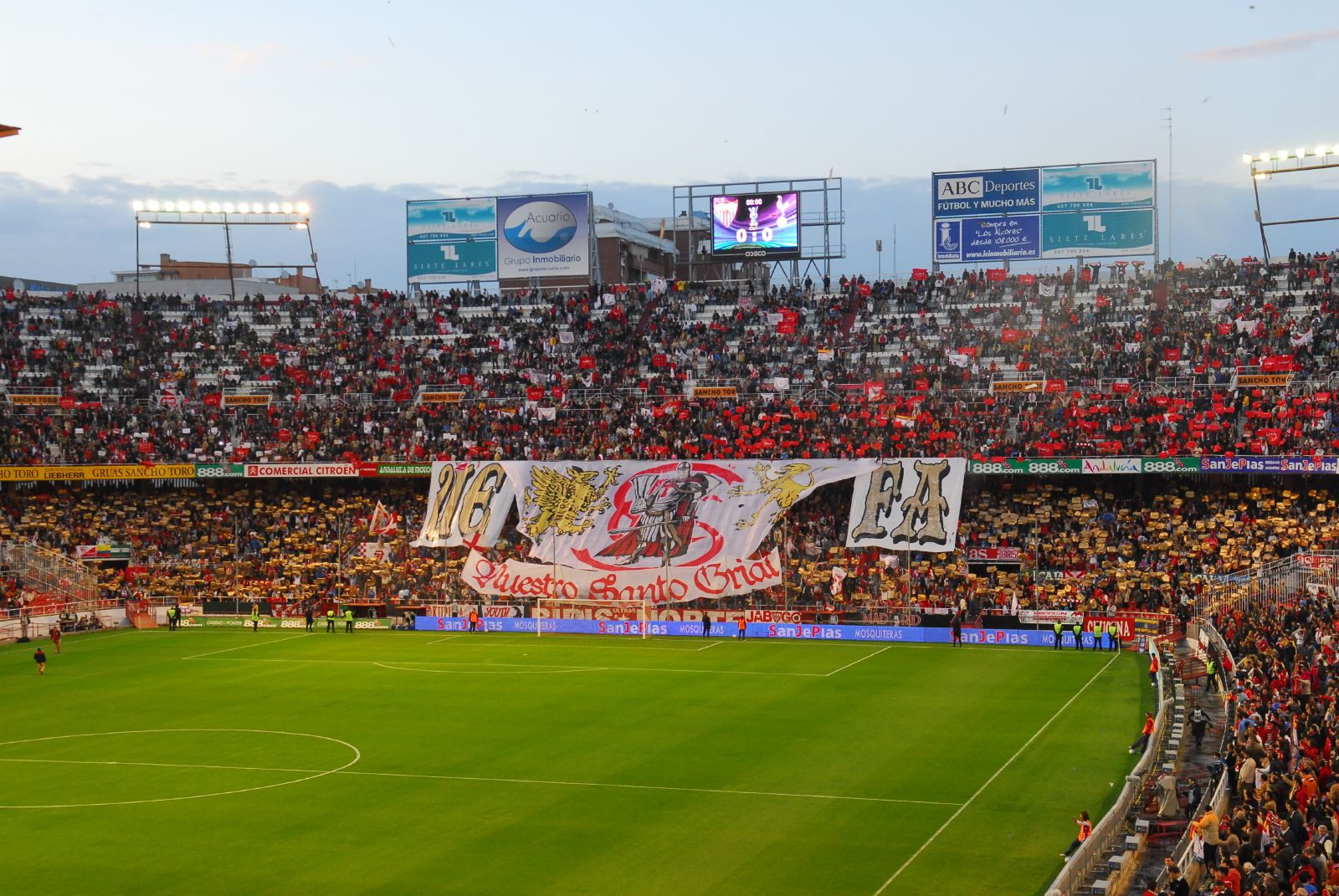
Biris Norte's banner at the Ramón Sánchez Pizjuán Stadium

The Biris Norte is an organized group of ultra supporters located in the North grandstand of the Ramón Sánchez Pizjuán. The group's name comes from the Gambian player Alhaji Momodo Njie, nicknamed Biri Biri, who became very popular among the Sevilla fans in the 1970s. The "Biris Norte" was created in the 1974–75 season and is one of the oldest groups of Ultra fans in Spain.

=== Rivalries ===
Sevilla compete in the Seville derby against their cross-city rivals Real Betis. The two played each other for the first time on 8 October 1915 in a match which was won 4–3 by Sevilla. The game is considered one of the most important derbies in Spanish football. Sevilla also has a significant rivalry with Atlético Madrid and Valencia CF.
