= José María del Nido Carrasco =

Spanish businessman (born 1978)

José María del Nido Carrasco (born 1978) is a Spanish lawyer and businessman. He was elected president of Sevilla FC in 2023.

== Biography ==
Del Nido Carrasco was born in Seville. His father, José María del Nido Benavente (born 1957) was president of Sevilla FC from 2002 to 2013, his grandfather José María del Nido Borrego (died 2014) was vice president of the club in the 1970s, and he was registered as a member as soon as he was born. Del Nido Carrasco graduated with a law degree from the Alfonso X El Sabio University, and entered the club's board in December 2006.

Del Nido Benavente resigned when sentenced to prison and was succeeded as club president by José Castro Carmona, who did not step down when the former was released from prison in 2017. Del Nido Carrasco took the side of Castro rather than his father. He was vice president of the club from 2014 to 2017 when he resigned in protest at Castro's sale of Vitolo to Atlético Madrid, after having announced the renewal of the player. Del Nido Carrasco returned to the same office in December 2019.

As part of a pact between rival groups of shareholders – including the supporters of Castro and Del Nido Benavente – Del Nido Carrasco was elected president of Sevilla FC on 31 December 2023. Castro became his vice president. The pact originated in 2019 as a way to minimise the influence of American investors 777 Partners. Del Nido Carrasco has supported La Liga president Javier Tebas against FC Barcelona and Real Madrid's attempts to form a European Super League, and welcomed the investment in La Liga from CVC Capital Partners.

In June 2026, Del Nido Carrasco said that he had received death threats due to Sevilla's poor performances in the previous season and debts of €88 million. He said that his shareholding in the club was minimal and that he would leave as soon as the board had a vote of no confidence in him.
