= Monchi =

Spanish footballer and club director

Personal information
- Full name: Ramón Rodríguez Verdejo
- Date of birth: 20 September 1968 (age 58)
- Place of birth: San Fernando, Spain
- Height: 1.83 m (6 ft 0 in)
- Position: Goalkeeper

Youth career
- San Fernando

Senior career*
Years	Team	Apps	(Gls)
1988–1990	Sevilla B	41	(0)
1990–1999	Sevilla	85	(0)
Total		126	(0)
- * Club domestic league appearances and goals

Ramón Rodríguez Verdejo (born 20 September 1968), known as Monchi, is a Spanish former professional footballer who played as a goalkeeper. He is the sporting director of La Liga club Espanyol.

He played solely for Sevilla in a nine-year professional career. Later, he worked as director of football at that club (two spells), Roma and Aston Villa.

== Playing career ==
Born in San Fernando, Andalusia, Monchi signed with Sevilla from his local club San Fernando. He made his senior debut with the former's reserves in the 1988–89 season, in the Segunda División B.

In the summer of 1990, Monchi was promoted to the main squad in La Liga. He first appeared in the competition on 13 January 1991, starting in a 1–1 away draw against Real Sociedad.

Monchi spent the vast majority of his career as a backup to Juan Carlos Unzué, only featuring more regularly from 1995 onwards. He played a career-best 26 matches in 1996–97, as the campaign ended in relegation.

Monchi retired in 1999 aged only 30, after contributing 20 games – playoffs included – to his team's promotion.

== Sporting director ==
In 2000, after Sevilla were relegated from the top division, Monchi was appointed their director of football. He was given two objectives by the board: develop the club's youth system and implement a vast scouting policy inside and outside Spain.

Monchi helped discover Diego Capel, Alberto Moreno, Jesús Navas, Antonio Puerta, Sergio Ramos and José Antonio Reyes, and he also created a network of over 700 scouts around the world. Within this setup, he sourced a number of profitable bargains (including Adriano, Dani Alves, Júlio Baptista, Federico Fazio, Seydou Keita and Ivan Rakitić), making a profit of around €200 million in the transfer market, as the club established itself in the top half of the top division in his 16 years there.

Monchi asked to leave Sevilla in the 2016 off-season, but the board did not accept his request unless he paid his €5 million buyout clause. He left in April 2017, having helped win eleven trophies during his tenure. Later that month, he signed a four-year contract in the same role with Roma in Italy's Serie A.

On 17 March 2019, Monchi confirmed that he would be returning to Sevilla as sporting director the following month. He occupied the position until June 2023, when he was announced as president of football operations at Premier League club Aston Villa.

On 23 September 2025, Monchi stepped down from his position to take on an advisory role at parent company V Sports. He returned to sporting director duties in May 2026, being appointed at Espanyol.

== See also ==
- List of one-club men
