= 2023 UEFA Super Cup =

- Match programme cover
Manchester City	Sevilla
(The Football Association)	(Royal Spanish Football Federation)
1	1
- Manchester City won 5–4 on penalties
- Date: 16 August 2023
- Venue: Karaiskakis Stadium, Piraeus
- Man of the Match: Cole Palmer (Manchester City)
- Referee: François Letexier (France)
- Attendance: 29,207
- Weather: Clear night 28 °C (82 °F); 47% humidity

The 2023 UEFA Super Cup was the 48th edition of the UEFA Super Cup, an annual football match organised by UEFA and contested by the reigning champions of the top two European club competitions, the UEFA Champions League and the UEFA Europa League. The match featured English club Manchester City, winners of the 2022–23 UEFA Champions League, and Spanish club Sevilla, winners of the 2022–23 UEFA Europa League. It was played at the Karaiskakis Stadium in Piraeus, Greece, on 16 August 2023.

The match was originally scheduled to be played at the Ak Bars Arena in Kazan, Russia. However, due to the Russian invasion of Ukraine, it was moved on 25 January 2023 to Athens.

Manchester City won the match 5–4 on penalties following a 1–1 draw after 90 minutes for their first UEFA Super Cup title.

== Teams ==
Team	Qualification	Previous participations (bold indicates winners)
(The Football Association) Manchester City	Winners of the 2022–23 UEFA Champions League	None
(Royal Spanish Football Federation) Sevilla	Winners of the 2022–23 UEFA Europa League	6 (**2006**, 2007, 2014, 2015, 2016, 2020)

== Venue ==
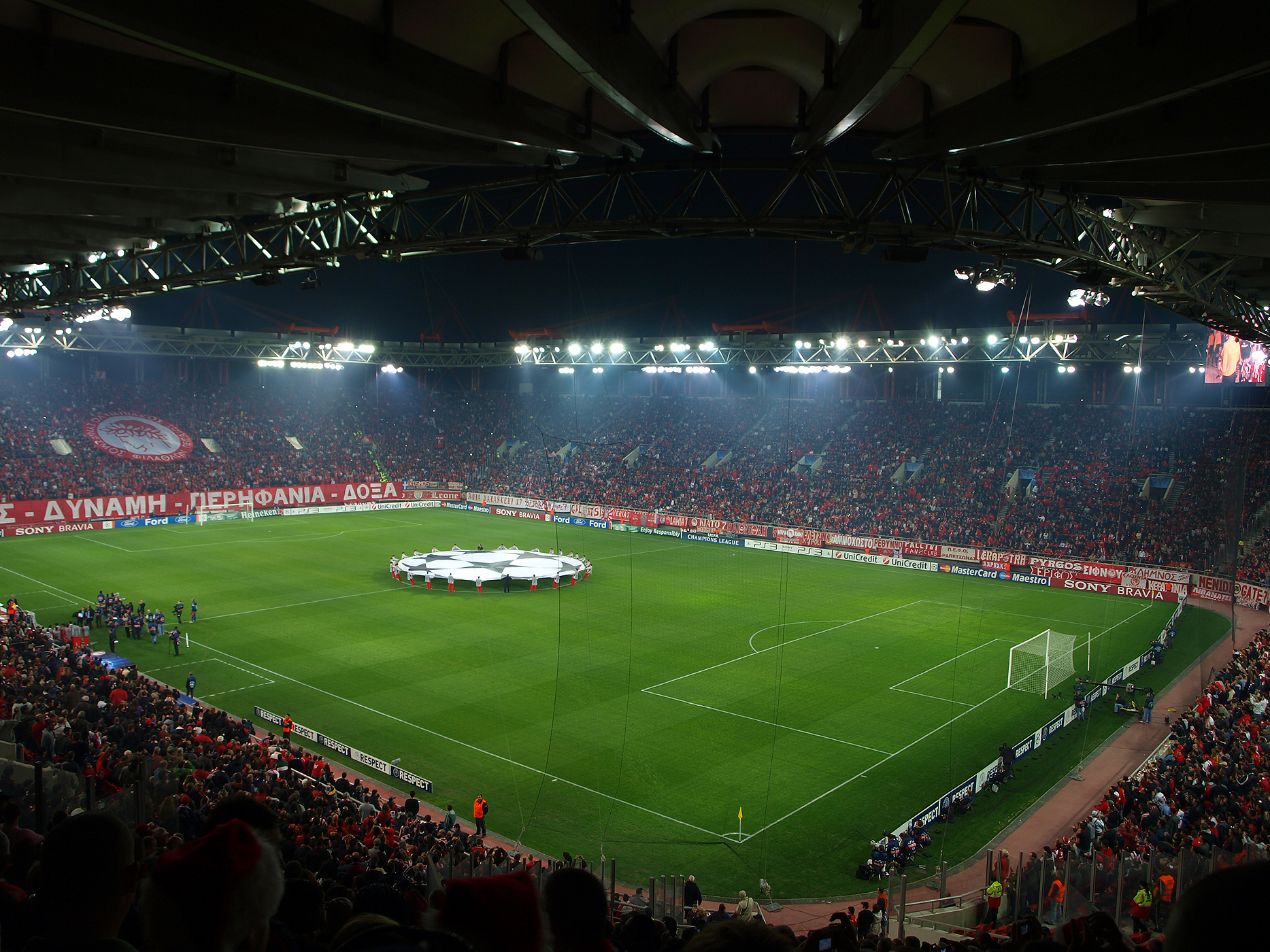
The Karaiskakis Stadium in Piraeus hosted the match.

=== Original host selection ===
The Ak Bars Arena in Kazan, Russia, was originally selected as the final host by the UEFA Executive Committee during their meeting in Amsterdam, Netherlands, on 2 March 2020. The Albanian Football Association also had bid for the match to be hosted in Tirana, but withdrew the candidature prior to the vote.

The match would have been the first UEFA Super Cup to be held in Russia, and the second UEFA club competition final to be held in the city after the 2009 UEFA Women's Cup final. The stadium was previously a venue for the 2017 FIFA Confederations Cup, where it hosted three group stage matches and a semi-final, and the 2018 FIFA World Cup, where it hosted four group stage matches, a round of 16 fixture and a quarter-final.

=== Relocation to Piraeus ===
After the Russian invasion of Ukraine, it was uncertain whether the match would be played in Kazan. Russia was suspended from UEFA and FIFA competitions in February 2022, and the 2022 UEFA Champions League final, scheduled to take place in Saint Petersburg, was also relocated to Paris. Tatarstan officials had called for UEFA to keep the competition in Kazan.

This would be the second time a UEFA club competition final is hosted at the Karaiskakis Stadium in Athens after the 1971 European Cup Winners' Cup final. Prior to the relocation, Athens had been selected as one of the hosts for the 2024 UEFA Europa Conference League final at Agia Sophia Stadium.

On 25 January 2023, the UEFA Executive Committee stripped Kazan of hosting rights and relocated the match to the Karaiskakis Stadium in Piraeus, Greece.

== Pre-match ==
=== Officials ===
On 14 August 2023, UEFA named French official François Letexier as the referee for the match. Letexier had been a FIFA referee since 2017 and previously worked as one of the assistant video assistant referees for the 2019 UEFA Super Cup. He was accompanied by fellow countrymen Cyril Mugnier and Mehdi Rahmouni as assistant referees, while Espen Eskås of Norway served as the fourth official. Compatriot Jérôme Brisard was selected as the video assistant referee (VAR), with fellow countrymen Eric Wattellier and Fedayi San of Switzerland serving as the assistant VAR officials.

== Match ==
=== Summary ===
Manchester City came close to opening the scoring in the 8th minute after a header from Nathan Aké was saved by Yassine Bounou. Jack Grealish also had an effort from outside the penalty area saved by Bounou in the 17th minute. In the 25th minute, Sevilla took the lead after a cross into the penalty area by Marcos Acuña found its way on to the head of Youssef En-Nesyri, who managed to head the ball into the bottom left-hand corner of the net. In the second half, En-Nesyri was put through on goal by Lucas Ocampos before his resulting effort was saved by Ederson. Cole Palmer made it 1–1 in the 63rd minute after heading the ball past Bounou via a cross in by Rodri. In the 64th minute, En-Nesyri was put through on goal again by Ocampos but was again denied by Ederson. Palmer also had a curling effort saved by Bounou in the 69th minute. Constant pressure from City eventually lead to Aké having a header end up being tipped over by Bounou. The match finished 1–1 after 90 minutes and so went to a penalty shoot-out. With both teams scoring their first four penalties, City captain Kyle Walker scored their fifth penalty before Nemanja Gudelj missed the crucial penalty for Sevilla by hitting the crossbar which meant Manchester City won the Super Cup 5–4 on penalties.

=== Details ===
The Champions League winners were designated as the "home" team for administrative purposes.

16 August 2023
22:00 UTC+3

Manchester City (The Football Association)	1–1	(Royal Spanish Football Federation) Sevilla
Palmer 63'	Report	En-Nesyri 25'
Penalties
Haaland (penalty scored); Álvarez (penalty scored); Kovačić (penalty scored); Grealish (penalty scored); Walker (penalty scored)	5–4	(penalty scored) Ocampos; (penalty scored) Mir; (penalty scored) Rakitić; (penalty scored) Montiel; (penalty missed) Gudelj

Karaiskakis Stadium, Piraeus
Attendance: 29,207
Referee: François Letexier (France)

**Manchester City**	**Sevilla**

GK	31	(Brazil) Ederson
RB	2	(England) Kyle Walker (c)
CB	25	(Switzerland) Manuel Akanji
CB	24	(Croatia) Joško Gvardiol
LB	6	(Netherlands) Nathan Aké
CM	8	(Croatia) Mateo Kovačić
CM	16	(Spain) Rodri
RW	80	(England) Cole Palmer	(substituted off) 85'
AM	47	(England) Phil Foden
LW	10	(England) Jack Grealish
CF	9	(Norway) Erling Haaland
Substitutes:
GK	18	(Germany) Stefan Ortega
GK	33	(England) Scott Carson
DF	3	(Portugal) Rúben Dias
DF	5	(England) John Stones
DF	14	(Spain) Aymeric Laporte
DF	21	(Spain) Sergio Gómez
DF	82	(England) Rico Lewis
MF	4	(England) Kalvin Phillips
MF	32	(Argentina) Máximo Perrone
MF	87	(England) James McAtee
FW	19	(Argentina) Julián Álvarez	(substituted on) 85'
FW	52	(Norway) Oscar Bobb
Manager:
(Spain) Pep Guardiola

GK	13	(Morocco) Yassine Bounou
RB	16	(Spain) Jesús Navas (c)		(substituted off) 83'
CB	22	(France) Loïc Badé	(yellow card) 33'
CB	6	(Serbia) Nemanja Gudelj
LB	19	(Argentina) Marcos Acuña
CM	8	(Spain) Joan Jordán
CM	10	(Croatia) Ivan Rakitić
RW	5	(Argentina) Lucas Ocampos
AM	21	(Spain) Óliver Torres		(substituted off) 74'
LW	17	(Argentina) Erik Lamela	(yellow card) 62'	(substituted off) 90+3'
CF	15	(Morocco) Youssef En-Nesyri		(substituted off) 90+3'
Substitutes:
GK	1	(Serbia) Marko Dmitrović
DF	2	(Argentina) Federico Gattoni
DF	3	(Spain) Adrià Pedrosa
DF	4	(Argentina) Gonzalo Montiel		(substituted on) 83'
DF	27	(Spain) Kike Salas
MF	18	(Switzerland) Djibril Sow
MF	24	(Argentina) Alejandro Gómez
MF	26	(Spain) Juanlu	(yellow card) 90'	(substituted on) 74'
MF	28	(Spain) Manu Bueno
FW	7	(Spain) Suso		(substituted on) 90+3'
FW	9	(Spain) Rafa Mir		(substituted on) 90+3'
FW	11	(Mexico) Jesús Corona
Manager:
(Spain) José Luis Mendilibar

Man of the Match:
Cole Palmer (Manchester City)

Assistant referees:
Cyril Mugnier (France)
Mehdi Rahmouni (France)
Fourth official:
Espen Eskås (Norway)
Video assistant referee:
Jérôme Brisard (France)
Assistant video assistant referees:
Eric Wattellier (France)
Fedayi San (Switzerland)

**Match rules**

- 90 minutes, no extra time was played
- Penalty shoot-out if scores level
- Twelve named substitutes
- Maximum of five substitutions (Note: Each team was given only three opportunities to make substitutions, excluding substitutions made at half-time.)

=== Statistics ===
First half
Statistic	Manchester City	Sevilla
Goals scored	0	1
Total shots	9	4
Shots on target	3	1
Saves	0	3
Ball possession	72%	28%
Corner kicks	4	0
Fouls committed	1	9
Offsides	0	3
Yellow cards	0	1
Red cards	0	0

Second half
Statistic	Manchester City	Sevilla
Goals scored	1	0
Total shots	14	4
Shots on target	4	3
Saves	3	3
Ball possession	69%	31%
Corner kicks	4	0
Fouls committed	4	5
Offsides	0	0
Yellow cards	0	2
Red cards	0	0

Overall
Statistic	Manchester City	Sevilla
Goals scored	1	1
Total shots	23	8
Shots on target	7	4
Saves	3	6
Ball possession	71%	29%
Corner kicks	8	0
Fouls committed	5	14
Offsides	0	3
Yellow cards	0	3
Red cards	0	0

== See also ==
- 2023 UEFA Champions League final
- 2023 UEFA Europa League final
- 2023–24 UEFA Champions League
- 2023–24 UEFA Europa League
- 2023–24 Manchester City F.C. season
- 2023–24 Sevilla FC season
- Manchester City F.C. in international football
- Sevilla FC in European football
