= 2023–24 Sevilla FC season =

Sevilla FC
2023–24 season
- President: José Castro Carmona (until 30 December); José María del Nido Carrasco (from 31 December)
- Head coach: José Luis Mendilibar (until 8 October); Diego Alonso (from 10 October to 16 December); Quique Sánchez Flores (from 18 December)
- Stadium: Ramón Sánchez Pizjuán
- La Liga: 14th
- Copa del Rey: Quarter-finals
- UEFA Champions League: Group stage
- UEFA Super Cup: Runners-up
- Top goalscorer: League: Youssef En-Nesyri (16); All: Youssef En-Nesyri (20)
- Highest home attendance: 42,222 vs Real Betis
- Lowest home attendance: 28,366 vs Athletic Bilbao
- Biggest win: Sevilla 5–1 Almería
- Biggest defeat: Girona 5–1 Sevilla
Home colours	Away colours	Third colours

The 2023–24 season was Sevilla Fútbol Club's 117th season in existence and 23rd consecutive season in La Liga. They also competed in the Copa del Rey, the UEFA Champions League and the UEFA Super Cup.

Sevilla suffered a poor first half of the season, being eliminated in the Champions League group stage without a single win and languishing in the lower half of the league table, leading to the sackings of two managers (first José Luis Mendilibar and then Diego Alonso) before the new year. The club would finish the season in 14th, its worst placing since gaining promotion to the top flight in the 2000–01 campaign. Sevilla also failed to qualify for any European competition for the first time since 2002–03.

== Players ==
=== First-team squad ===
As of 2 February 2024.

Note: Flags indicate national team as defined under FIFA eligibility rules; some limited exceptions apply. Players may hold more than one non-FIFA nationality.

No.	Pos.	Nation	Player
1	GK	SRB	Marko Dmitrović
2	DF	ESP	Kike Salas
3	DF	ESP	Adrià Pedrosa
4	DF	ESP	Sergio Ramos (vice-captain)
5	FW	ARG	Lucas Ocampos
6	DF	SRB	Nemanja Gudelj
7	FW	ESP	Suso
8	MF	ESP	Joan Jordán
9	FW	ESP	Rafa Mir
10	FW	ARG	Alejo Véliz (on loan from Tottenham Hotspur)
11	FW	BEL	Dodi Lukebakio
12	FW	DOM	Mariano
13	GK	NOR	Ørjan Nyland
14	DF	FRA	Tanguy Nianzou

No.	Pos.	Nation	Player
15	FW	MAR	Youssef En-Nesyri
16	DF	ESP	Jesús Navas (captain)
17	FW	ARG	Erik Lamela
18	MF	SUI	Djibril Sow
19	DF	ARG	Marcos Acuña
20	FW	ESP	Isaac Romero
21	MF	ESP	Óliver Torres
22	DF	FRA	Loïc Badé
23	DF	BRA	Marcão
24	MF	FRA	Boubakary Soumaré (on loan from Leicester City)
25	FW	BEL	Adnan Januzaj
26	DF	ESP	Juanlu
42	MF	FRA	Lucien Agoumé (on loan from Inter Milan)
46	MF	TUN	Hannibal Mejbri (on loan from Manchester United)

=== Reserve squad ===
Note: Flags indicate national team as defined under FIFA eligibility rules; some limited exceptions apply. Players may hold more than one non-FIFA nationality.

No.	Pos.	Nation	Player
28	MF	ESP	Manu Bueno
29	DF	ESP	Darío Benavides
30	FW	SEN	Ibrahima Sow
31	GK	ESP	Alberto Flores
32	GK	ESP	Rafael Romero
33	GK	ESP	Matías Árbol
34	FW	ESP	Isra Domínguez

No.	Pos.	Nation	Player
35	DF	ESP	Xavi Sintes
36	DF	ESP	Oso
37	MF	ESP	Alberto Collado
38	DF	ESP	Diego Hormigo
39	MF	ESP	Lulo Dasilva
40	MF	ESP	Miguel Capitas
41	MF	BEL	Stanis Idumbo

=== Out on loan ===
Note: Flags indicate national team as defined under FIFA eligibility rules; some limited exceptions apply. Players may hold more than one non-FIFA nationality.

No.	Pos.	Nation	Player
—	DF	ARG	Federico Gattoni (at Anderlecht until 30 June 2024)
—	DF	ARG	Gonzalo Montiel (at Nottingham Forest until 30 June 2024)
—	DF	ESP	José Ángel Carmona (at Getafe until 30 June 2024)
—	DF	SWE	Ludwig Augustinsson (at Anderlecht until 30 June 2024)

No.	Pos.	Nation	Player
—	MF	ESP	Óscar (at Getafe until 30 June 2024)
—	MF	DEN	Thomas Delaney (at Anderlecht until 30 June 2024)
—	FW	ESP	Luismi Cruz (at Tenerife until 30 June 2024)

== Transfers ==
=== In ===
Pos.	Player	Transferred from	Fee	Date	Ref.
DF	(France) Loïc Badé	(France) Rennes	€12,000,000	1 July 2023	
MF	(Spain) Juanlu	(Spain) Mirandés	Loan return	1 July 2023	
DF	(Spain) José Ángel Carmona	(Spain) Elche	Loan return	1 July 2023	
MF	(Denmark) Thomas Delaney	(Germany) 1899 Hoffenheim	Loan return	1 July 2023	
DF	(Argentina) Federico Gattoni	(Argentina) San Lorenzo	€1,200,000	1 July 2023	
MF	(Spain) Óscar	(Spain) Celta Vigo	Loan return	1 July 2023	
DF	(Spain) Adrià Pedrosa	(Spain) Espanyol	Free	1 July 2023	
DF	(Spain) Kike Salas	(Spain) Tenerife	Loan return	1 July 2023	
FW	(Spain) Iván Romero	(Spain) Tenerife	Loan return	1 July 2023	
MF	(Switzerland) Djibril Sow	(Germany) Eintracht Frankfurt	€10,000,000	4 August 2023	
GK	(Norway) Ørjan Nyland	(Germany) RB Leipzig	Free	20 August 2023	
FW	(Belgium) Dodi Lukebakio	(Germany) Hertha BSC	€10,000,000	23 August 2023	
MF	(France) Boubakary Soumaré	(England) Leicester City	Loan	1 September 2023	
FW	(Dominican Republic) Mariano	(Spain) Real Madrid	Free	1 September 2023	
DF	(Spain) Sergio Ramos	(France) Paris Saint-Germain	Free	4 September 2023	
MF	(France) Lucien Agoumé	(Italy) Inter Milan	Loan	10 January 2024	
MF	(Tunisia) Hannibal Mejbri	(England) Manchester United	Loan	15 January 2024	
FW	(Argentina) Alejo Véliz	(England) Tottenham Hotspur	Loan	1 February 2024	

=== Out ===
Pos.	Player	Transferred to	Fee	Date	Ref.
FW	(Spain) Bryan Gil	(England) Tottenham Hotspur	Loan return	1 July 2023	
MF	(Senegal) Pape Gueye	(France) Marseille	Loan return	1 July 2023	
DF	(Brazil) Alex Telles	(England) Manchester United	Loan return	1 July 2023	
DF	(Spain) Luismi Cruz	(Spain) Tenerife	Loan	15 July 2023	
DF	(Spain) José Ángel Carmona	(Spain) Getafe	Loan	20 July 2023	
FW	(Portugal) Rony Lopes	(Portugal) Braga	€500,000	2 August 2023	
FW	(Spain) Iván Romero	(Spain) Levante	Free	12 August 2023	
DF	(Sweden) Ludwig Augustinsson	(Belgium) Anderlecht	Loan	16 August 2023	
GK	(Morocco) Yassine Bounou	(Saudi Arabia) Al-Hilal	€21,000,000	17 August 2023	
MF	(Denmark) Thomas Delaney	(Belgium) Anderlecht	Loan	22 August 2023	
DF	(Argentina) Gonzalo Montiel	(England) Nottingham Forest	Loan	23 August 2023	
MF	(Argentina) Alejandro Gómez	Released		1 September 2023	
MF	(Morocco) Oussama Idrissi	Released		1 September 2023	
MF	(Spain) Óscar Rodríguez	(Spain) Getafe	Loan	1 September 2023	
MF	(Mexico) Jesús Corona	(Mexico) Monterrey	€3,500,000	1 September 2023	
MF	(Brazil) Fernando	Released		1 January 2024	
DF	(Argentina) Federico Gattoni	(Belgium) Anderlecht	Loan	30 January 2024	
MF	(Croatia) Ivan Rakitić	(Saudi Arabia) Al-Shabab	Free	30 January 2024	

Notes
1.The agreement includes the possibility of activating a purchase option for 20 million euros

=== New contracts ===
Position	Player	Until	Ref.
MF	(Serbia) Nemanja Gudelj	June 2026	
MF	(Spain) Jesús Navas	December 2024	
GK	(Norway) Ørjan Nyland	June 2026	

== Pre-season and friendlies ==
Win Draw Loss

14 July 2023 Friendly	Sevilla	2–0	Córdoba	Jerez de la Frontera
19:00 CEST (UTC+2)	Romero 71'; Gattoni (yellow card) 72'; Lamela 90+1' (pen.)	Report	Sala (yellow card) 57'; Simo (yellow card) 84'	Stadium: Campo Hotel Barceló Montecastillo; Attendance: 0 Referee: Javier Sánchez Carreras

18 July 2023 Friendly	Sevilla	5–2	Ceuta	Arcos de la Frontera
19:00 CEST (UTC+2)	Corona 26', 51'; Mir 28'; Óscar 60'; Gómez 86'	Report	García 43'; Hoyos 84'	Stadium: Estadio Antonio Barbadillo; Referee: Gonzalo González Páez

19 July 2023 UEFA–CONMEBOL Club Challenge	Sevilla	1–1 (4–1 p)	Independiente del Valle	Seville
22:00 CEST (UTC+2)	Ortiz 90+1'	Report	Díaz 10'; Sornoza (yellow card) 44'; Ramírez (yellow card) 90'	Stadium: Ramón Sánchez Pizjuán; Attendance: 19,407; Referee: Rade Obrenović (Slovenia)
	Penalties
	Jordán (penalty scored); Romero (penalty scored); Idrissi (penalty scored); Gómez (penalty scored)		(penalty missed) Faravelli; (penalty scored) Hoyos; (penalty missed) Moreno

22 July 2023 Friendly	Hansa Rostock	2–1	Sevilla	Rostock, Germany
14:00 CEST (UTC+2)	Pröger 10'; Schumacher (yellow card) 18'; Bachmann 33'; Roßbach (yellow card) 46'	Report	Mir 63'	Stadium: Ostseestadion; Attendance: 22,000; Referee: Bastian Dankert (Germany)

23 July 2023 Friendly	1. FC Magdeburg	3–1	Sevilla	Magdeburg, Germany
15:00 CEST (UTC+2)	Schuler 14'; Bell Bell 40'; Atik 43'	Report	Schuler 18' (o.g.); Jordán (yellow card) 45'; Nianzou (yellow card) 61'; Ocampos (penalty missed) 76'; Romero (yellow card) 77'	Stadium: MDCC-Arena; Attendance: 14,150; Referee: Daniel Bartnitzki (Germany)

31 July 2023 Friendly	Crystal Palace	1–1 (0–1 p)	Sevilla	Detroit, United States
19:00 EDT (UTC−4)	Andersen (yellow card) 70'; Eze 75'	Report	Gudelj (yellow card) 9' (yellow-red card) 80'; Rakitić 44', (yellow card) 62'	Stadium: Comerica Park; Referee: Natalie Simon (United States)
	Penalties
	Andersen (penalty missed)		(penalty scored) Rakitić
Note: Penalty shoot-out was immediate sudden death.

3 August 2023 La Liga Summer Tour	Sevilla	1–0	Real Betis	Zapopan, Mexico
21:00 CST (UTC−6)	Gómez (yellow card) 27'; Montiel (yellow card) 34'; Fernando (yellow card) 40'; En-Nesyri 90+2'	Report	Pezzella (yellow card) 32'; Bellerín (yellow card) 78'	Stadium: Estadio Akron; Referee: Víctor Alfonso Cáceres Hernández (Mexico)

5 August 2023 La Liga Summer Tour	Atlético Madrid	1–1	Sevilla	San Francisco, United States
19:00 PDT (UTC−7)	Söyüncü (yellow card) 33'; Correa 84'	Report	Jordán (yellow card) 57'; Mir 66'	Stadium: Oracle Park; Referee: Timothy Ford (United States)

== Competitions ==
=== Overall record ===
Competition	First match	Last match	Starting round	Final position	Record							
Competition	First match	Last match	Starting round	Final position	Pld	W	D	L	GF	GA	GD	Win %
La Liga	11 August 2023	26 May 2024	Matchday 1	14th	38	10	11	17	48	54	−6	26.32
Copa del Rey	1 November 2023	25 January 2024	First round	Quarter-finals	5	4	0	1	10	3	+7	80.00
UEFA Champions League	20 September 2023	12 December 2023	Group stage	Group stage	6	0	2	4	7	12	−5	0.00
UEFA Super Cup	16 August 2023		Final	Runners-up	1	0	1	0	1	1	+0	0.00
Total					50	14	14	22	66	70	−4	28.00

Source: Soccerway

=== La Liga ===
==== League table ====
Pos	Team	Pld	W	D	L	GF	GA	GD	Pts
12	Getafe	38	10	13	15	42	54	−12	43
13	Celta Vigo	38	10	11	17	46	57	−11	41 (Note: Celta Vigo finished ahead of Sevilla on head-to-head points: Celta Vigo 1–1 Sevilla, Sevilla 1–2 Celta Vigo.)
14	Sevilla	38	10	11	17	48	54	−6	41
15	Mallorca	38	8	16	14	33	44	−11	40 (Note: Mallorca finished ahead of Las Palmas on head-to-head points: Las Palmas 1–1 Mallorca, Mallorca 1–0 Las Palmas.)
16	Las Palmas	38	10	10	18	33	47	−14	40

Source: LaLiga EA Sports
Rules for classification: 1) Points; 2) Head-to-head points; 3) Head-to-head goal difference; 4) Goal difference; 5) Goals scored; 6) Fair-play points
(Note: Head-to-head record is used only after all the matches between the teams in question have been played)

==== Results summary ====
Overall								Home						Away					
Pld	W	D	L	GF	GA	GD	Pts	W	D	L	GF	GA	GD	W	D	L	GF	GA	GD
38	10	11	17	48	54	−6	41	6	5	8	27	27	0	4	6	9	21	27	−6

Source: La Liga

==== Results by round ====
Round	1	2	3	4	5	6	7	8	9	10	11	12	13	14	15	16	17	18	19	20	21	22	23	24	25	26	27	28	29	30	31	32	33	34	35	36	37	38
Ground	H	A	H	A	H	A	H	A	H	H	A	A	H	A	H	A	H	A	H	H	A	H	A	H	A	A	H	A	H	A	A	H	A	H	A	H	A	H
Result	L	L	L	L	W	D	W	L	D	D	D	D	D	L	D	L	L	W	L	L	L	D	W	W	D	L	W	D	L	W	W	W	D	W	L	L	L	L
Position	15	18	20	20	17	17	12	15	14	13	14	15	13	15	15	16	17	15	16	17	17	16	15	15	15	15	14	14	16	14	13	12	13	12	12	12	13	14

Source: La Liga
A = Away; H = Home; W = Win; D = Draw; L = Loss

==== Matches ====
The league fixtures were unveiled on 22 June 2023.

11 August 2023 1	Sevilla	1–2	Valencia	Seville
22:00 CEST (UTC+2)	Rakitić (yellow card) 15'; Gudelj (yellow card) 15'; En-Nesyri 67'; Badé (red card) 81'; Acuña (yellow card) 90+7'	Report	Diakhaby (yellow card) 10', (goal) 60'; Özkacar (yellow card) 16'; Guerra 88'	Stadium: Ramón Sánchez Pizjuán; Attendance: 34,184; Referee: José María Sánchez Martínez

21 August 2023 2	Alavés	4–3	Sevilla	Vitoria-Gasteiz
19:00 CEST (UTC+2)	Rioja 7'; Duarte 44'; Kike 54', 59'; Gorosabel (yellow card) 90+1'	Report	Abqar 15' (o.g.); Lamela 41'; Gudelj (yellow card) 62'; Mir 90+7'; Torres (yellow card) 90+9'	Stadium: Mendizorrotza; Attendance: 15,308; Referee: Guillermo Cuadra Fernández

26 August 2023 3	Sevilla	1–2	Girona	Seville
21:30 CEST (UTC+2)	Gudelj 45+2'; Ocampos (yellow card) 58'; Salas (yellow card) 75'	Report	Herrera 16'; Martínez (yellow card) 37'; A. García 56'	Stadium: Ramón Sánchez Pizjuán; Attendance: 29,304; Referee: Jesús Gil Manzano

17 September 2023 5	Sevilla	1–0	Las Palmas	Seville
18:30 CEST (UTC+2)	Torres (yellow card) 32'; Mir (yellow card) 38'; Ocampos (yellow card) 69'; Lukebakio 71'	Report	Munir (yellow card) 49'; Araujo (yellow card) 45+5'; Rodríguez (yellow card) 52'; Viera (yellow card) 62'	Stadium: Ramón Sánchez Pizjuán; Attendance: 40,578; Referee: Juan Martínez Munuera

23 September 2023 6	Osasuna	0–0	Sevilla	Pamplona
16:15 CEST (UTC+2)	Budimir (yellow card) 68'; Torró (yellow card) 69'	Report	Salas (yellow card) 57'; Rakitić (yellow card) 64'; Pedrosa (yellow card) 81'	Stadium: El Sadar; Attendance: 19,670; Referee: Javier Iglesias Villanueva

26 September 2023 7	Sevilla	5–1	Almería	Seville
19:00 CEST (UTC+2)	En-Nesyri 7'; Lukebakio 8'; Suso 38', (yellow card) 84'; Lamela 51', (yellow card) 90+1'; Navas (yellow card) 70'; Salas 90+2'	Report	Suárez 71' (pen.); Kaiky (yellow card) 77'; Baba (yellow card) 86'	Stadium: Ramón Sánchez Pizjuán; Attendance: 35,729; Referee: Guillermo Cuadra Fernández

29 September 2023 8	Barcelona	1–0	Sevilla	Barcelona
21:00 CEST (UTC+2)	Cancelo (yellow card) 45'; Ramos 76' (o.g.); Gündoğan (yellow card) 90+3'	Report	Juanlu (yellow card) 50'; Lamela (yellow card) 52'; Badé (yellow card) 89'	Stadium: Estadi Olímpic Lluís Companys; Attendance: 41,116; Referee: Miguel Ángel Ortiz Arias

7 October 2023 9	Sevilla	2–2	Rayo Vallecano	Seville
21:00 CEST (UTC+2)	Gudelj (yellow card) 36'; Sow (yellow card) 45+3', (goal) 50'; Suso (yellow card) 67'; Navas (yellow card) 84'; En-Nesyri 90+6'; Jordán (yellow card) 90+7'	Report	Valentín 21'; García 26'; Hernández (yellow card) 74'; Juanlu (yellow card) 50'; Pérez (yellow card) 84'	Stadium: Ramón Sánchez Pizjuán; Attendance: 35,817; Referee: Isidro Díaz de Mera Escuderos

21 October 2023 10	Sevilla	1–1	Real Madrid	Seville
18:30 CEST (UTC+2)	Alaba 74' (o.g.); Ramos (yellow card) 76'; Ocampos (yellow card) 78'; Sow (yellow card) 87'; Soumaré (yellow card) 87'; Lamela (yellow card) 90+7'	Report	Carvajal 78'; Vinícius (yellow card) 86'; Camavinga (yellow card) 90+4'	Stadium: Ramón Sánchez Pizjuán; Attendance: 41,212; Referee: Ricardo de Burgos Bengoetxea

28 October 2023 11	Cádiz	2–2	Sevilla	Cádiz
21:00 CEST (UTC+2)	Mari (yellow card) 4'; Ramos 8'; Alejo (yellow card) 11'; Fali (yellow card) 14'; Kouamé (yellow card) 24'; Machís 28'; Lucas Pires (yellow card) 45+6'; Sobrino (yellow card) 77'	Report	Ramos (yellow card) 3'; Ocampos 37'; Soumaré (yellow card) 45+1'; Rakitić 60'; Acuña (yellow card) 79'	Stadium: Nuevo Mirandilla; Attendance: 18,886; Referee: César Soto Grado

4 November 2023 12	Celta Vigo	1–1	Sevilla	Vigo
18:30 CET (UTC+1)	Starfelt 22'; Tapia (yellow card) 45' (yellow-red card) 65'	Report	Soumaré (yellow card) 28'; Rakitić (yellow card) 45'; Torres (yellow card) 65'; Gudelj (yellow card) 80'; En-Nesyri 84', (yellow card) 89'	Stadium: Balaídos; Attendance: 19,023; Referee: Alejandro Hernández Hernández

12 November 2023 13	Sevilla	1–1	Real Betis	Seville
18:30 CET (UTC+1)	Gudelj (yellow card) 27'; Rakitić 79'	Report	Miranda (yellow card) 42'; Pérez 72'	Stadium: Ramón Sánchez Pizjuán; Attendance: 42,222; Referee: Jesús Gil Manzano

26 November 2023 14	Real Sociedad	2–1	Sevilla	San Sebastián
16:15 CET (UTC+1)	Dmitrović 3' (o.g.); Sadiq 22'; Merino (yellow card) 33'; Traoré (yellow card) 78'	Report	En-Nesyri 60'; Ramos (yellow card) 82', (red card) 88'; Navas (red card) 88'	Stadium: Reale Arena; Attendance: 33,879; Referee: Miguel Ángel Ortiz Arias

3 December 2023 15	Sevilla	1–1	Villarreal	Seville
18:30 CET (UTC+1)	Sow (yellow card) 45+3'; Juanlu (yellow card) 52'; Salas 75'; Rakitić (yellow card) 90+6'	Report	Pedraza (yellow card) 45'; Altimira (yellow card) 54'; Morales 77'; Reina (yellow card) 90+8'	Stadium: Ramón Sánchez Pizjuán; Attendance: 33,898; Referee: Isidro Díaz de Mera Escuderos

9 December 2023 16	Mallorca	1–0	Sevilla	Palma
21:00 CET (UTC+1)	Larin 11'; J. Costa (yellow card) 68'; Abdón (yellow card) 90+3'	Report	En-Nesyri (yellow card) 45+2'; Soumaré (yellow card) 74'	Stadium: Estadi Mallorca Son Moix; Attendance: 16,041; Referee: Javier Alberola Rojas

16 December 2023 17	Sevilla	0–3	Getafe	Seville
18:30 CET (UTC+1)	Dmitrović (yellow card) 4'; Gudelj (yellow card) 77'; Rakitić (yellow card) 86'	Report	Mayoral 5' (pen.); Milla (yellow card) 12'; Álvarez (yellow card) 24'; Mata 37', (yellow card) 90+4'; Greenwood 80' (pen.)	Stadium: Ramón Sánchez Pizjuán; Attendance: 30,005; Referee: Juan Luis Pulido Santana

19 December 2023 18	Granada	0–3	Sevilla	Granada
21:30 CET (UTC+1)	Gumbau (yellow card) 38'; Torrente (yellow card) 57'	Report	Pedrosa 23'; Ocampos 32'; Ramos 49'; Bueno (yellow card) 74'	Stadium: Nuevo Los Cármenes; Attendance: 16,534; Referee: Mateo Busquets Ferrer

23 December 2023 4	Atlético Madrid	1–0	Sevilla	Madrid
16:15 CET (UTC+1)	Giménez (yellow card) 38'; Llorente 46', (yellow card) 90+4'; Söyüncü (red card) 70'; Correa (yellow card) 77'; Witsel (yellow card) 77'; De Paul (yellow card) 85'; Azpilicueta (yellow card) 90'	Report	Suso (yellow card) 43'; Salas (yellow card) 68'; Ramos (yellow card) 83'	Stadium: Cívitas Metropolitano; Attendance: 64,308; Referee: César Soto Grado
Note: The match was originally scheduled for 3 September 2023, but was postponed due to flash floods.

4 January 2024 19	Sevilla	0–2	Athletic Bilbao	Seville
19:15 CET (UTC+1)	Sow (yellow card) 36'; Rakitić (yellow card) 75'; Marcão (yellow card) 86'	Report	Vesga 30'; Paredes 76'; R. García (yellow card) 90+2'	Stadium: Ramón Sánchez Pizjuán; Attendance: 28,366; Referee: José María Sánchez Martínez

12 January 2024 20	Sevilla	2–3	Alavés	Seville
21:00 CET (UTC+1)	Soumaré (yellow card) 50'; Marcão (yellow card) 58'; Navas (yellow card) 63'; Mir 70'; Mariano (yellow card) 73'; Ocampos 82' (pen.)	Report	Marín (yellow card) 23'; Tenaglia 26'; Kike 40', (yellow card) 90+1'; Benavídez (yellow card) 81'; Duarte 90'	Stadium: Ramón Sánchez Pizjuán; Attendance: 34,225; Referee: Alejandro Hernández Hernández

21 January 2024 21	Girona	5–1	Sevilla	Girona
21:00 CET (UTC+1)	Dovbyk 13', 15', 19'; Tsyhankov 56'; Stuani 89'	Report	Romero 10'; Sow (yellow card) 61'; Mejbri (yellow card) 63'	Stadium: Montilivi; Attendance: 13,092; Referee: Pablo González Fuertes

28 January 2024 22	Sevilla	1–1	Osasuna	Seville
18:30 CET (UTC+1)	Agoumé (yellow card) 6'; Romero 24'; Soumaré (yellow card) 56'; Ramos (yellow card) 84'; Suso (red card) 86'	Report	Budimir 55'	Stadium: Ramón Sánchez Pizjuán; Attendance: 36,640; Referee: Guillermo Cuadra Fernández

5 February 2024 23	Rayo Vallecano	1–2	Sevilla	Madrid
21:00 CET (UTC+1)	Palazón 29'; Crespo (yellow card) 90+2'; Dimitrievski (yellow card) 90+7'	Report	En-Nesyri 19', 45'; Romero (yellow card) 36'; Acuña (yellow card) 45+5'; Mejbri (yellow card) 85'	Stadium: Campo de Fútbol de Vallecas; Attendance: 12,546; Referee: Francisco José Hernández Maeso

11 February 2024 24	Sevilla	1–0	Atlético Madrid	Seville
18:30 CET (UTC+1)	Romero 15'; Suso (yellow card) 70'; En-Nesyri (yellow card) 77'	Report	Witsel (yellow card) 26'	Stadium: Ramón Sánchez Pizjuán; Attendance: 31,528; Referee: Javier Iglesias Villanueva

17 February 2024 25	Valencia	0–0	Sevilla	Valencia
21:00 CET (UTC+1)		Report	Badé (yellow card) 78'	Stadium: Mestalla; Attendance: 44,506; Referee: César Soto Grado

25 February 2024 26	Real Madrid	1–0	Sevilla	Madrid
21:00 CET (UTC+1)	Kroos (yellow card) 35'; Modrić 81'	Report	Ocampos (yellow card) 70'; Nianzou (yellow card) 90+1'; Sow (yellow card) 90+8'	Stadium: Santiago Bernabéu; Attendance: 74,969; Referee: Isidro Díaz de Mera Escuderos

2 March 2024 27	Sevilla	3–2	Real Sociedad	Seville
14:00 CET (UTC+1)	En-Nesyri 11', 13'; Ramos 65'; Nianzou (yellow card) 87'	Report	Silva 45+5' (pen.); Pacheco (yellow card) 67'; Méndez 90+2'; Zubeldia (yellow card) 90+7'	Stadium: Ramón Sánchez Pizjuán; Attendance: 35,884; Referee: Mateo Busquets Ferrer

11 March 2024 28	Almería	2–2	Sevilla	Almería
21:00 CET (UTC+1)	Embarba 38'; Lopy (yellow card) 84'; Milovanović 90+5'; González (yellow card) 90+6'	Report	Badé (yellow card) 43'; Lukebakio 81'; Ocampos 86'	Stadium: Power Horse Stadium; Attendance: 13,095; Referee: Ricardo de Burgos Bengoetxea

17 March 2024 29	Sevilla	1–2	Celta Vigo	Seville
14:00 CET (UTC+1)	En-Nesyri 18'; Ramos (yellow card) 29'; Acuña (yellow card) 29'; Navas (yellow card) 56'; Soumaré (yellow card) 90+3'	Report	Pérez 72'; Larsen 78'	Stadium: Ramón Sánchez Pizjuán; Attendance: 36,544; Referee: Francisco José Hernández Maeso

30 March 2024 30	Getafe	0–1	Sevilla	Getafe
14:00 CET (UTC+1)	Óscar (yellow card) 43'; Rico (yellow card) 90'; Mata (yellow card) 90+4'; Aleñá (yellow card) 90+7'	Report	Ramos 5'; Salas (yellow card) 21'; Soumaré (yellow card) 36'; Gudelj (yellow card) 74'; Romero (yellow card) 88'; Acuña (yellow card) 88'	Stadium: Coliseum; Attendance: 10,139; Referee: Javier Iglesias Villanueva

14 April 2024 31	Las Palmas	0–2	Sevilla	Las Palmas
13:00 WEST (UTC+1)	Coco (red card) 6'; Suárez (yellow card) 7'; Sandro (yellow card) 43'; Marvin (yellow card) 45+4'	Report	En-Nesyri 43'; Badé (yellow card) 61'; Salas (yellow card) 73'; Nyland (yellow card) 90+1'; Lukebakio 90+3'	Stadium: Estadio Gran Canaria; Attendance: 23,698; Referee: Alejandro Muñiz Ruiz

22 April 2024 32	Sevilla	2–1	Mallorca	Seville
21:00 CEST (UTC+2)	En-Nesyri 61'; Romero 75'	Report	S. Costa (yellow card) 21'; Copete (yellow card) 73'; Abdón 90+5'	Stadium: Ramón Sánchez Pizjuán; Attendance: 35,203; Referee: Alejandro Hernández Hernández

28 April 2024 33	Real Betis	1–1	Sevilla	Seville
21:00 CEST (UTC+2)	Fornals (yellow card) 6'; Isco 38' (pen.), (yellow card) 40'; Cardoso (yellow card) 90+4'	Report	En-Nesyri (yellow card) 16'; Salas 56', (yellow card) 90+4'; Soumaré (yellow card) 61'; Suso (yellow card) 74'; Acuña (yellow card) 81'	Stadium: Benito Villamarín; Attendance: 55,770; Referee: José María Sánchez Martínez

5 May 2024 34	Sevilla	3–0	Granada	Seville
21:00 CEST (UTC+2)	Acuña 11'; En-Nesyri 51'; Ocampos (yellow card) 72'; Lukebakio 80'; Badé (yellow card) 90+3'	Report	Ruiz (yellow card) 38'; Miguel Ángel (yellow card) 53'	Stadium: Ramón Sánchez Pizjuán; Attendance: 32,668; Referee: Mateo Busquets Ferrer

11 May 2024 35	Villarreal	3–2	Sevilla	Villarreal
16:15 CEST (UTC+2)	Sørloth 30', 90+7'; Cuenca (yellow card) 63'; Reina (yellow card) 76'; Mosquera 84'; Bailly (yellow card) 88'	Report	Nianzou (yellow card) 17'; En-Nesyri 26' (pen.), 44'; Ocampos (yellow card) 70'; Salas (yellow card) 88'; Agoumé (yellow card) 90+5'; Ramos (yellow card) 90+7'	Stadium: Estadio de la Cerámica; Attendance: 16,862; Referee: Isidro Díaz de Mera Escuderos

15 May 2024 36	Sevilla	0–1	Cádiz	Seville
19:30 CEST (UTC+2)	Ocampos (yellow card) 47'; Acuña (yellow card) 55'; Soumaré (yellow card) 62'; Navas (yellow card) 68'; Agoumé (yellow card) 76'; Salas (yellow card) 90+4'	Report	J. Hernández (yellow card) 50'; Escalante (yellow card) 70'; Guardiola 90+6'	Stadium: Ramón Sánchez Pizjuán; Attendance: 35,805; Referee: Miguel Ángel Ortiz Arias

19 May 2024 37	Athletic Bilbao	2–0	Sevilla	Bilbao
19:00 CEST (UTC+2)	R. García 17'; Munian 19'; Ruiz de Galarreta (yellow card) 37'	Report	Salas (yellow card) 45+2'	Stadium: San Mamés; Attendance: 44,717; Referee: Juan Luis Pulido Santana

26 May 2024 38	Sevilla	1–2	Barcelona	Seville
21:00 CEST (UTC+2)	En-Nesyri 31'; Salas (yellow card) 36'; Ocampos (yellow card) 90+3'	Report	Lewandowski 15'; Cancelo (yellow card) 49'; López 59'	Stadium: Ramón Sánchez Pizjuán; Attendance: 34,888; Referee: Javier Iglesias Villanueva

=== Copa del Rey ===
1 November 2023 First round	Quintanar	0–3	Sevilla	Quintanar de la Orden
15:30 CET (UTC+1)	Nuñez (yellow card) 59'; Jiménez (yellow card) 90+1'	Report	Mir 22'; En-Nesyri 40'; Badé (yellow card) 59'; Pedrosa 90'	Stadium: Alfonso Viller García; Attendance: 4,500; Referee: Juan Martínez Munuera

6 December 2023 Second round	Atlético Astorga	0–2	Sevilla	Astorga
21:00 CET (UTC+1)	Bueno (yellow card) 25'; Amor (yellow card) 40'; Misffut (yellow card) 72'	Report	Ramos 28' (pen.); Gattoni 68'	Stadium: La Eragudina; Attendance: 2,050; Referee: Alejandro Muñiz Ruiz

7 January 2024 Round of 32	Racing Ferrol	1–2	Sevilla	Ferrol
16:00 CET (UTC+1)	Manzanara 50', (yellow card) 66' (yellow-red card) 75'; Giménez (yellow card) 82'; Delgado (yellow card) 90+2'	Report	Marcão 30', (yellow card) 81'; Juanlu 87'	Stadium: Estadio Municipal da Malata; Attendance: 11,011; Referee: Guillermo Cuadra Fernández

16 January 2024 Round of 16	Getafe	1–3	Sevilla	Getafe
20:00 CET (UTC+1)	Mata 23', (yellow card) 80'	Report	Ramos 8'; Romero 48', 55'; Nianzou (yellow card) 74'; Marcão (yellow card) 90+6'	Stadium: Coliseum; Attendance: 12,581; Referee: Alejandro Muñiz Ruiz
Note: Mata was booked after being substituted out of the match.

25 January 2024 Quarter-finals	Atlético Madrid	1–0	Sevilla	Madrid
21:00 CET (UTC+1)	Griezmann (penalty missed) 26'; Giménez (yellow card) 63'; Hermoso (yellow card) 71'; Koke (yellow card) 75'; Depay 79'	Report	Torres (yellow card) 33'; Ramos (yellow card) 39'; Pedrosa (yellow card) 62'; Lamela (yellow card) 73'; Rakitić (yellow card) 82'; Mir (yellow card) 90+8'	Stadium: Cívitas Metropolitano; Attendance: 60,169; Referee: Jesús Gil Manzano

=== UEFA Champions League ===
==== Group stage ====
The draw for the group stage was held on 31 August 2023.

Pos	Team	Pld	W	D	L	GF	GA	GD	Pts	Qualification	ARS	PSV	LEN	SEV
1	(England) Arsenal	6	4	1	1	16	4	+12	13	Advance to knockout phase	—	4–0	6–0	2–0
2	(Netherlands) PSV Eindhoven	6	2	3	1	8	10	−2	9	Advance to knockout phase	1–1	—	1–0	2–2
3	(France) Lens	6	2	2	2	6	11	−5	8	Transfer to Europa League	2–1	1–1	—	2–1
4	(Spain) Sevilla	6	0	2	4	7	12	−5	2		1–2	2–3	1–1	—

Source: UEFA
Rules for classification: Group stage tiebreakers

20 September 2023 1	Sevilla (Spain)	1–1	(France) Lens	Seville
21:00 CEST (UTC+2)	Ocampos 9', (yellow card) 73'; Gudelj (yellow card) 37'; Ramos (yellow card) 70'	Report	Medina (yellow card) 14'; Sotoca (yellow card) 17'; Samba (yellow card) 18'; Fulgini 24', (yellow card) 30'; Haïdara (yellow card) 90'	Stadium: Ramón Sánchez Pizjuán; Attendance: 33,544; Referee: Tobias Stieler (Germany)

3 October 2023 2	PSV Eindhoven (Netherlands)	2–2	(Spain) Sevilla	Eindhoven, Netherlands
21:00 CEST (UTC+2)	Veerman (yellow card) 27'; De Jong 86' (pen.), (yellow card) 90+8'; Lozano (yellow card) 90+1'; Teze 90+5'	Report	Navas (yellow card) 36'; Gudelj 68'; En-Nesyri 87'; Badé (yellow card) 90+7'	Stadium: Philips Stadion; Attendance: 34,206; Referee: Daniele Orsato (Italy)

24 October 2023 3	Sevilla (Spain)	1–2	(England) Arsenal	Seville
21:00 CEST (UTC+2)	Gudelj 58'; Mariano (yellow card) 67'; Lamela (yellow card) 76'	Report	Martinelli 45+4'; Gabriel Jesus 53'; Jorginho (yellow card) 68'	Stadium: Ramón Sánchez Pizjuán; Attendance: 39,595; Referee: Glenn Nyberg (Sweden)

8 November 2023 4	Arsenal (England)	2–0	(Spain) Sevilla	London, England
20:00 GMT (UTC+0)	Trossard 29'; Saka 64'; Zinchenko (yellow card) 82'; Rice (yellow card) 85'	Report	Soumaré (yellow card) 66'; Juanlu (yellow card) 71'; Ocampos (yellow card) 77'	Stadium: Emirates Stadium; Attendance: 60,024; Referee: István Kovács (Romania)

29 November 2023 5	Sevilla (Spain)	2–3	(Netherlands) PSV Eindhoven	Seville
18:45 CET (UTC+1)	Ramos 24'; En-Nesyri 47'; Ocampos (yellow card) 63' (yellow-red card) 66'; Fernando (red card) 90+8'	Report	Lozano (yellow card) 33'; Saibari 68'; Gudelj 81' (o.g.); Pepi 90+2'	Stadium: Ramón Sánchez Pizjuán; Attendance: 29,403; Referee: Davide Massa (Italy)
Note: Fernando was sent off from the bench having already been substituted out of the match.

12 December 2023 6	Lens (France)	2–1	(Spain) Sevilla	Lens, France
18:45 CET (UTC+1)	El Aynaoui (yellow card) 37'; Frankowski 63' (pen.); Medina (yellow card) 75'; Fulgini (yellow card) 85', (goal) 90+6'; Danso (yellow card) 90+9'	Report	Soumaré (yellow card) 61'; Salas (yellow card) 65'; Ramos 79' (pen.), (yellow card) 80'; Mir (yellow card) 90+9'	Stadium: Stade Bollaert-Delelis; Attendance: 37,456; Referee: Felix Zwayer (Germany)

=== UEFA Super Cup ===
16 August 2023 Final	Manchester City (England)	1–1 (5–4 p)	(Spain) Sevilla	Piraeus, Greece
22:00 EEST (UTC+3)	Palmer 63'	Report	En-Nesyri 25'; Badé (yellow card) 33'; Lamela (yellow card) 62'; Juanlu (yellow card) 90'	Stadium: Karaiskakis Stadium; Attendance: 29,207; Referee: François Letexier (France)
	Penalties
	Haaland (penalty scored); Álvarez (penalty scored); Kovačić (penalty scored); Grealish (penalty scored); Walker (penalty scored)		(penalty scored) Ocampos; (penalty scored) Mir; (penalty scored) Rakitić; (penalty scored) Montiel; (penalty missed) Gudelj

== Statistics ==
=== Squad appearances and goals ===
No.	Pos	Nat	Player	Total		La Liga		Copa del Rey		Champions League		UEFA Super Cup	
No.	Pos	Nat	Player	Apps	Goals	Apps	Goals	Apps	Goals	Apps	Goals	Apps	Goals
Goalkeepers
1	GK	(Serbia) SRB	Marko Dmitrović	19	0	13	0	2	0	4	0	0	0
13	GK	(Norway) NOR	Ørjan Nyland	28	0	24	0	2	0	2	0	0	0
31	GK	(Spain) ESP	Alberto Flores	1	0	0	0	1	0	0	0	0	0
Defenders
3	DF	(Spain) ESP	Adrià Pedrosa	40	2	15+16	1	5	1	4	0	0	0
4	DF	(Spain) ESP	Sergio Ramos	37	7	28	3	4	2	5	2	0	0
14	DF	(France) FRA	Tanguy Nianzou	14	0	3+5	0	3+1	0	0+2	0	0	0
16	DF	(Spain) ESP	Jesús Navas	36	0	25+4	0	1+1	0	3+1	0	1	0
19	DF	(Argentina) ARG	Marcos Acuña	26	1	18+3	1	0+1	0	2+1	0	1	0
22	DF	(France) FRA	Loïc Badé	33	0	27+1	0	2	0	1+1	0	1	0
23	DF	(Brazil) BRA	Marcão	10	1	3+4	0	2+1	1	0	0	0	0
26	DF	(Spain) ESP	Juanlu	37	1	11+15	0	3+1	1	3+3	0	0+1	0
27	DF	(Spain) ESP	Kike Salas	28	3	19+4	3	2+1	0	2	0	0	0
29	DF	(Spain) ESP	Darío Benavides	2	0	0	0	1+1	0	0	0	0	0
38	DF	(Spain) ESP	Diego Hormigo	1	0	0+1	0	0	0	0	0	0	0
Midfielders
6	MF	(Serbia) SRB	Nemanja Gudelj	30	3	20+2	1	0+1	0	6	2	1	0
8	MF	(Spain) ESP	Joan Jordán	13	0	4+4	0	2	0	1+1	0	1	0
18	MF	(Switzerland) SUI	Djibril Sow	33	1	18+6	1	3	0	5+1	0	0	0
21	MF	(Spain) ESP	Óliver Torres	35	0	18+9	0	4	0	1+2	0	1	0
24	MF	(France) FRA	Boubakary Soumaré	34	0	26+2	0	2	0	2+2	0	0	0
28	MF	(Spain) ESP	Manu Bueno	6	0	1+3	0	1+1	0	0	0	0	0
42	MF	(France) FRA	Lucien Agoumé	13	0	9+3	0	0+1	0	0	0	0	0
46	MF	(Tunisia) TUN	Hannibal Mejbri	6	0	1+5	0	0	0	0	0	0	0
Forwards
5	FW	(Argentina) ARG	Lucas Ocampos	45	5	34+1	4	3+1	0	4+1	1	1	0
7	FW	(Spain) ESP	Suso	34	1	15+14	1	2	0	1+1	0	0+1	0
9	FW	(Spain) ESP	Rafa Mir	22	3	3+12	2	3+1	1	0+2	0	0+1	0
10	FW	(Argentina) ARG	Alejo Véliz	6	0	0+6	0	0	0	0	0	0	0
11	FW	(Belgium) BEL	Dodi Lukebakio	27	5	12+11	5	0	0	3+1	0	0	0
12	FW	(Dominican Republic) DOM	Mariano	13	0	2+7	0	0+1	0	0+3	0	0	0
15	FW	(Morocco) MAR	Youssef En-Nesyri	41	20	28+5	16	1	1	6	2	1	1
17	FW	(Argentina) ARG	Erik Lamela	19	2	5+8	2	1+1	0	2+1	0	1	0
20	FW	(Spain) ESP	Isaac Romero	16	6	14	4	2	2	0	0	0	0
25	FW	(Belgium) BEL	Adnan Januzaj	11	0	0+8	0	1+2	0	0	0	0	0
36	FW	(Spain) ESP	Oso	1	0	0	0	0+1	0	0	0	0	0
Players transferred out during the season
2	DF	(Argentina) ARG	Federico Gattoni	4	1	0+2	0	1+1	1	0	0	0	0
4	DF	(Argentina) ARG	Gonzalo Montiel	1	0	0	0	0	0	0	0	0+1	0
10	MF	(Croatia) CRO	Ivan Rakitić	27	2	16+2	2	0+2	0	5+1	0	1	0
11	FW	(Mexico) MEX	Jesús Corona	2	0	0+2	0	0	0	0	0	0	0
13	GK	(Morocco) MAR	Yassine Bounou	2	0	1	0	0	0	0	0	1	0
20	MF	(Brazil) BRA	Fernando	13	0	5+3	0	1	0	4	0	0	0
