= Pep Clotet =

Spanish football coach

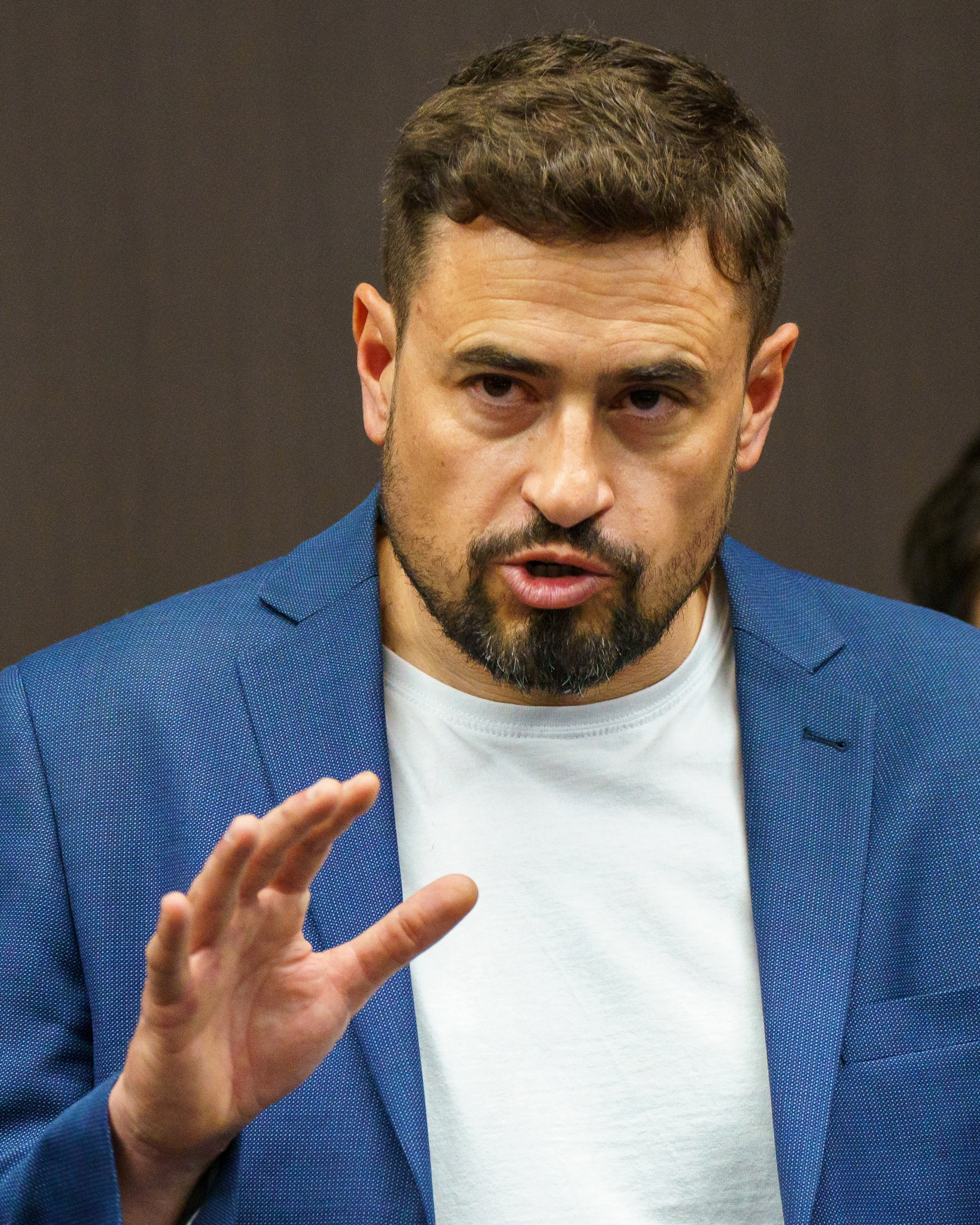
- Clotet with Torpedo Moscow in 2023

Personal information
- Full name: Josep Clotet Ruiz
- Date of birth: 28 April 1977 (age 49)
- Place of birth: Barcelona, Spain

Senior career*
Years	Team	Apps	(Gls)
–1998	Igualada		

Managerial career
- 1998–2001: Igualada (youth)
- 2001–2003: Cornellà
- 2004–2006: Espanyol (youth)
- 2006: Figueres
- 2008–2009: Espanyol (youth)
- 2009: Espanyol B
- 2010: Malmö (assistant)
- 2011: Halmstad
- 2011–2012: Viking (assistant)
- 2012–2013: Atlético Malagueño
- 2014–2015: Swansea City (assistant)
- 2016–2017: Leeds United (assistant)
- 2017–2018: Oxford United
- 2018–2019: Birmingham City (assistant)
- 2019–2020: Birmingham City
- 2021: Brescia
- 2021–2022: SPAL
- 2022: Brescia
- 2023: Brescia
- 2023: Torpedo Moscow
- 2024: Triestina
- * Club domestic league appearances and goals

Josep "Pep" Clotet Ruiz (born 28 April 1977) is a Spanish football coach.

As well as working as assistant at several clubs, he managed Cornellà, Figueres, Espanyol B, Halmstad, Atlético Malagueño, Oxford United, Birmingham City, SPAL and Brescia.

== Career ==
=== Early years ===
Born in Barcelona, Catalonia Clotet only appeared for local amateurs Igualada as a player. He became a coach while still in his 20s, starting with Cornellà then moving to Espanyol's youth teams.

Clotet began the 2006–07 season with another side in his native region, Figueres, being fired after only nine matches as they eventually suffered relegation from Segunda División B. He subsequently returned to his previous club, still in charge of the youths.

Clotet returned to senior football in the 2009–10 Segunda División B campaign with Espanyol's reserves. He met the same fate as in his previous experience: he was sacked following the seventh round, and the team were relegated.

=== Sweden and Norway ===
Clotet worked in Sweden for two years, starting as an assistant to Roland Nilsson at Malmö, who won the 2010 Allsvenskan title. He then joined fellow league club Halmstad as head coach, finishing 16th and last in the 2011 Allsvenskan.

On 20 September 2011, Clotet joined Viking as coach in new manager Åge Hareide's backroom staff for the 2012 Norwegian Premier League season. After Hareide was sacked and Kjell Jonevret was appointed as his replacement, he left to look for a new challenge.

=== Atlético Malagueño ===
On 11 July 2012, Clotet was appointed as manager of Tercera División club Atlético Malagueño – Málaga's reserves – where he helped develop several players who would reach the first team shortly after; their progress was aided by Málaga's unstable economic situation. He left the club after only one season, not being able to attain promotion.

=== Swansea City ===
On 19 November 2013, Clotet was appointed academy consultant at Swansea City as part of Michael Laudrup's coaching staff. In May of the following year, he was promoted to assistant manager under Garry Monk.

In November 2015, Clotet was offered the manager's job at Championship club Brentford, but rejected the offer out of loyalty to Monk. He left his post at the Welsh club on 9 December of that year alongside first-team coaches James Beattie and Kristian O'Leary, following the sacking of Monk.

=== Leeds United ===
On 13 June 2016, Clotet joined Monk's staff at Leeds United as assistant head coach. On 25 May 2017, after the pair led the team to seventh place in the 2016–17 Championship, Monk resigned. A month later, after the appointment as manager of Thomas Christiansen, who was intending to bring in his own backroom staff, director of football Victor Orta confirmed that Clotet wanted to leave to seek a new challenge.

=== Oxford United ===
Clotet was appointed manager of League One club Oxford United on 1 July 2017. He was sacked on 22 January 2018, with a record of 12 wins from 36 matches in charge.

=== Birmingham City ===
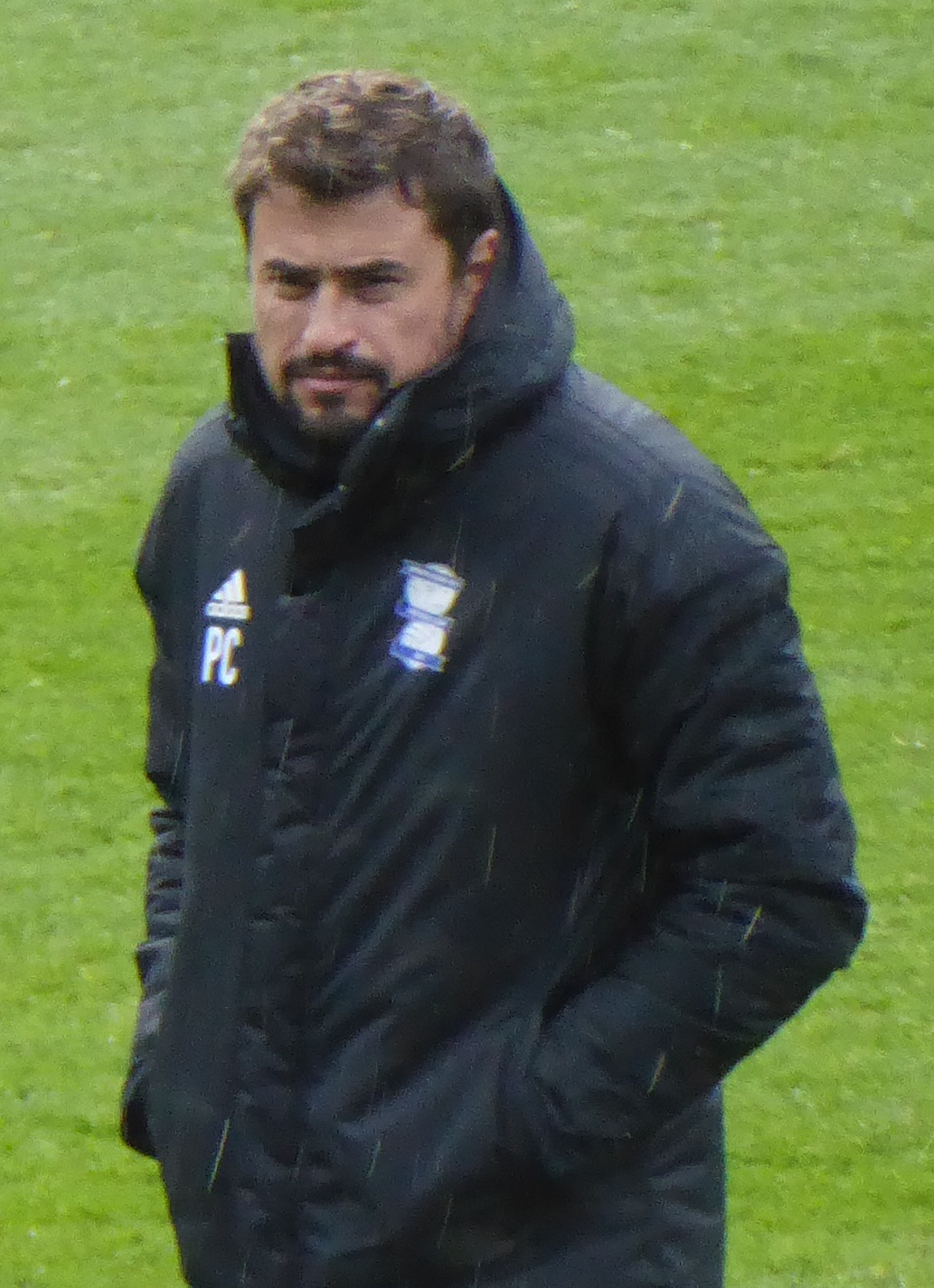
Clotet with Birmingham City in April 2019

When Monk took over as manager of Championship club Birmingham City on 4 March 2018, Clotet was appointed as his assistant. He became caretaker head coach in June 2019 after Monk was sacked; ahead of the November meeting between Birmingham and Monk's new club, Sheffield Wednesday, Monk claimed he had made an "error of judgment" in working with Clotet, suggested he was untrustworthy, and refused to shake his hand. After six months, during which Clotet made a start on implementing the board's footballing philosophy as well as demonstrating "coaching expertise, man-management and leadership skills, allied to exemplary professional conduct", and integrated the 16-year-old Jude Bellingham into a regular role in the first team, he was appointed as head coach on a permanent basis. Two months with only one league win at the end of the year was followed by the arrival of striker Scott Hogan, whose return to form sparked a ten-match unbeaten run in early 2020 which left the team 16th in the table when football was suspended due to the COVID-19 pandemic. On 8 June, Clotet confirmed that he would leave the club at the end of the season to "explore other coaching opportunities", but after a series of poor results, he left by mutual consent on 8 July with four matches of the season remaining.

=== Brescia ===
On 5 February 2021, Clotet was hired as new head coach of Italian Serie B club Brescia, a club owned by Massimo Cellino, his former chairman at Leeds United. He guided Brescia to qualification to the promotion playoffs, where they were eliminated in the first round by Cittadella. Clotet and Brescia subsequently parted ways by the end of the season.

=== SPAL ===
On 2 July 2021, Clotet was officially unveiled as the new head coach of Italian Serie B club SPAL.

He was removed from his managerial duties on 5 January 2022, leaving SPAL three points above the relegation zone.

=== Second stint at Brescia ===
On 18 June 2022, Clotet agreed to return to Cellino's Brescia, signing a two-year deal with the Rondinelle. After a good start of the season, Clotet experienced a negative string of results by December, leaving Brescia out of the relegation zone and leading to him being sacked on 21 December 2022. On 16 January 2023, however, Clotet was reinstated as head coach with immediate effect, only to be dismissed once again less than a month later, on 6 February, after he failed to improve the team results.

=== Torpedo Moscow ===
Clotet was appointed head coach of Russian Premier League club Torpedo Moscow on 28 March 2023. On 16 April 2023, in his third game in charge, against Spartak Moscow, Clotet was sent off after gesturing at the referee following Spartak's third penalty kick in the first half. However, he did not leave for the dressing room as he was supposed to, but instead climbed into the stands and continued to instruct his team from there.

On 13 May 2023, Torpedo lost their fifth league game in a row and lost their chances of avoiding direct relegation. The start of the second-tier 2023–24 Russian First League campaign was below expectations as well, with five wins and five losses in the first 12 games, and in October 2023, Torpedo announced the dismissal of Josep Clotet.

=== Triestina ===
On 21 October 2024, Clotet returned to Italy, accepting the head coaching job at bottom-placed Serie C club Triestina. On 8 November, after Spezia loanee Raimonds Krollis was sent off with a red card in the 34th minute in a match against Giana Erminio, Clotet physically confronted Krollis as he returned to the sidelines by grabbing him by the collar and shoving him. Triestina would go on to lose the match 0–1 and in a press conference after the loss Clotet said that his reaction was justified due to the nature of Krollis' red card and that he had told Krollis that he was done playing for the club as long as he was the coach. Clotet was dismissed on 27 November 2024, after failing to turn the club's fortunes.

== Media ==
Clotet worked as a pundit on Sky Sports' La Liga review, and also wrote a column for daily newspaper Marca.

== Managerial statistics ==
As of match Triestina–Renate played 22 November 2024

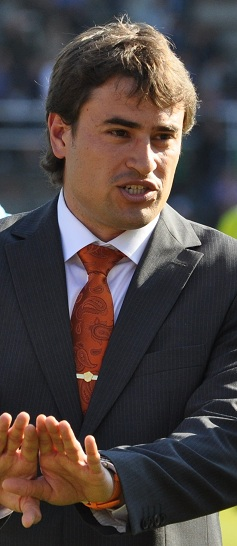
Clotet in 2011

Managerial record by team and tenure
Team	Nat	From	To	Record								
Team	Nat	From	To	P	W	D	L	GF	GA	GD	Win %	Ref
Cornellà	(Spain)	July 2001	June 2003	76	36	18	22	100	82	+18	47.37	
Figueres	(Spain)	July 2006	October 2006	9	1	3	5	5	12	−7	11.11	
Espanyol B	(Spain)	July 2009	October 2009	7	0	4	3	6	11	−5	0.00	
Halmstad	(Sweden)	January 2011	5 July 2011	15	2	4	9	12	24	−12	13.33	
Atlético Malagueño	(Spain)	11 July 2012	11 July 2013	40	20	13	7	74	30	+44	50.00	
Oxford United	(England)	1 July 2017	22 January 2018	36	13	8	15	68	64	+4	36.11	
Birmingham City	(England)	18 June 2019	8 July 2020	47	14	14	19	60	75	−15	29.79	
Brescia	(Italy)	7 February 2021	9 June 2021	19	10	4	5	31	20	+11	52.63	
SPAL	(Italy)	2 July 2021	5 January 2022	19	5	5	9	23	28	−5	26.32	
Brescia	(Italy)	18 June 2022	21 December 2022	20	7	6	7	24	29	−5	35.00	
Brescia	(Italy)	16 January 2023	6 February 2023	3	0	0	3	1	8	−7	0.00	
Torpedo Moscow	(Russia)	28 March 2023	3 October 2023	23	6	2	15	23	42	−19	26.09	
Triestina	(Italy)	21 October 2024	29 November 2024	6	0	2	4	1	6	−5	0.00	
Total				330	114	93	123	428	431	−3	34.55	—
