= Rafa Mir =

Spanish footballer (born 1997)

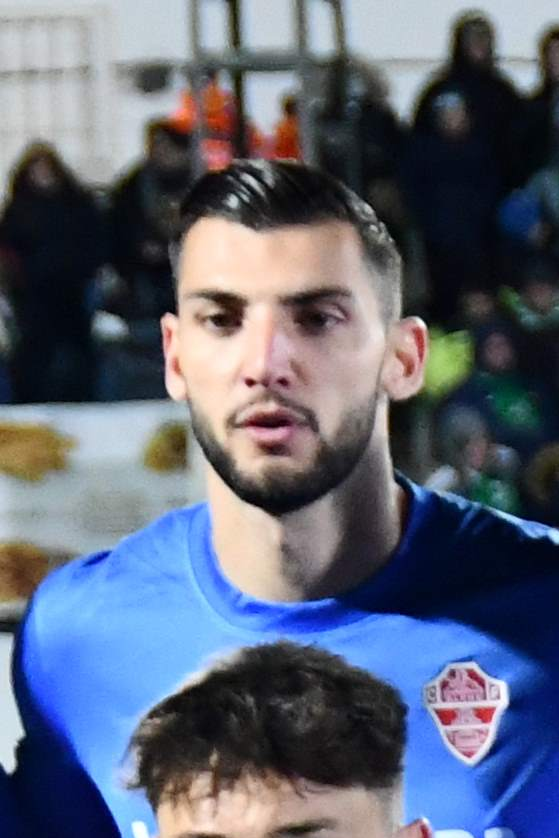
- Mir with Elche in 2025

Personal information
- Full name: Rafael Mir Vicente
- Date of birth: 18 June 1997 (age 29)
- Place of birth: Cartagena, Spain
- Height: 1.92 m (6 ft 4 in)
- Position: Forward

Team information
- Current team: Aris (on loan from Sevilla)
- Number: 17

Youth career
- 2004–2006: Javalí Nuevo
- 2006–2007: ElPozo Murcia
- 2007–2009: Ranero
- 2009–2011: Barcelona
- 2011–2012: Murcia
- 2012–2015: Valencia

Senior career*
Years	Team	Apps	(Gls)
2015–2018	Valencia B	60	(25)
2015–2018	Valencia	2	(0)
2018–2021	Wolverhampton Wanderers	2	(0)
2018–2019	→ Las Palmas (loan)	30	(7)
2019–2020	→ Nottingham Forest (loan)	11	(0)
2020–2021	→ Huesca (loan)	56	(22)
2021–	Sevilla	75	(18)
2024–2025	→ Valencia (loan)	20	(1)
2025–2026	→ Elche (loan)	27	(8)
2026–	→ Aris (loan)	9	(0)

International career
2018–2019	Spain U21	10	(5)
2021	Spain U23	7	(3)
Medal record
Men's football
Representing Spain
UEFA European Under-21 Championship
Winner	2019 Italy	Team
Summer Olympics
Silver medal – second place	2020 Tokyo	Team
- * Club domestic league appearances and goals as of 17:33, 16 November 2026 (UTC)

Rafael "Rafa" Mir Vicente (born 18 June 1997) is a Spanish professional footballer who plays as a forward for Greek Super League club Aris, on loan from La Liga club Sevilla.

Starting his career at Valencia, where he was primarily a reserve, Mir also represented Huesca, Sevilla and Elche in La Liga, recording league totals of 162 games and 40 goals. He won the Segunda División with Huesca in 2019–20, and the UEFA Europa League with Sevilla in 2022–23. Abroad, he played in the EFL Championship for Wolverhampton Wanderers and Nottingham Forest.

Mir won the 2019 European Championship with the Spain national under-21 football team, and a silver medal with the Olympic team at the 2020 tournament.

== Club career ==
=== Early career ===
Mir was born in Cartagena and raised in Javalí Nuevo, a village belonging to Murcia, also in the Region of Murcia. He began his career playing futsal with CD Javalí Nuevo. After a 120-goal spell at ElPozo Murcia FS he began playing full football with Ranero CF, scoring 57 and 84 goals in his respective seasons before joining FC Barcelona.

Mir's 32 goals at La Masia earned him a return to his native region and Real Murcia, where a 45-goal haul led to the attention of Valencia CF.

=== Valencia ===
Mir made his senior debut for Valencia's reserves on 1 March 2015, as an 88th-minute substitute for Wilfried Zahibo in a 2–1 Segunda División B loss at CE L'Hospitalet. Hescored his first senior goal six days later, in a 2–0 win over CF Badalona at the Ciudad Deportiva de Paterna. He finished the campaign with four appearances, as his side narrowly avoided relegation.

The following season, in the UEFA Youth League, Mir scored consecutive braces in victories over Gent. On 14 November 2015, he was given his first start for the B-side, playing the full 90 minutes in a 4–2 loss at another reserve team, Villarreal CF B.

On 20 November 2015, Mir was called up to the main squad by manager Nuno Espírito Santo for a La Liga game against UD Las Palmas; he was an unused substitute in the 1–1 draw at the Mestalla Stadium. He made his professional debut on 25 November, starting in a UEFA Champions League group stage match away to Zenit Saint Petersburg, being substituted by Santi Mina in the 56th minute of an eventual 2–0 defeat.

Mir made his top-flight debut against Las Palmas on 28 August 2016, replacing Enzo Pérez for the final four minutes of a 4–2 home loss. On 24 April 2017, he was hit by a car at a zebra crossing, suffering light injuries to his leg and arm.

Mir again spent the 2017–18 preseason with the first team of Marcelino García Toral, but with only one year left on his contract and not accepting the renewal offer proposed by the club, a way out began to be sought for the player, who had also received important offers. The doors of the first team were completely closed to him. He began the first half of the 2017–18 season for Valencia B in good form, scoring 15 goals in 19 games, attracting interest from Real Madrid and Wolverhampton Wanderers.

=== Wolverhampton Wanderers ===
On 3 January 2018, Mir joined Championship club Wolverhampton Wanderers for an undisclosed fee, signing a four-and-a-half-year contract with the club and taking the number 9 shirt. He linked up with former Valencia boss Nuno Espírito Santo, who gave him his first team debut at the club. He made his debut three days later in the FA Cup third round at home to Swansea City, playing the last 13 minutes of a goalless draw in place of Léo Bonatini.

On 23 July 2018, Mir joined Segunda División side UD Las Palmas on loan for one season. A year later, he returned to the Championship, on loan to Nottingham Forest. After struggling for both minutes and goals with Forest, Mir and Forest agreed for him to return to his parent club on 14 January 2020.

Immediately following his departure from Nottingham, Mir was loaned to Segunda División side SD Huesca for 18 months. He was sent off on 8 February 2020 in a 1–0 loss at Girona FC for elbowing Álex Granell and banned for one match. On 17 July, he scored twice in a 3–0 home win over CD Numancia to win promotion to the top flight with a game remaining.

On 15 December 2020, Mir scored a hat-trick in a 3–2 extra-time win over CD Marchamalo in the first round of the Copa del Rey. The following 29 January, he netted another treble in a 3–1 victory at Real Valladolid. He ended the league season with 13 goals, joint eighth-best.

=== 2021–2024 ===
On 20 August 2021, Mir signed a six-year contract with Sevilla for a fee potentially rising to €16 million. He made his debut three days later, as a substitute away to Getafe, and hit the post with a shot that Erik Lamela converted for the only goal of the game. On 22 September, in his fifth game overall, he made his first start and scored his first Sevilla goal, in a 3–1 home win over Valencia. he scored the first Champions League goal of his career on 23 November, in the seventh minute of added time in a 2–0 victory over VfL Wolfsburg. Mir played 48 games across all competitions in his first season and was the team's top scorer with 13 goals; fellow striker Youssef En-Nesyri had absences through injury and the 2021 Africa Cup of Nations.

In 2022–23, Mir competed with En-Nesyri for time on the pitch. In January, he overtook the Moroccan as top scorer for the season, but En-Nesyri was preferred by manager Jorge Sampaoli. Under new coach José Luis Mendilibar, Mir did not enter the pitch for the 2023 UEFA Europa League final, which his team won on penalties against Roma after a 1–1 draw; he was nonetheless given a yellow card in the first half for protesting against Paulo Dybala's goal for the Italian club.

Mir was approached by Valencia to return on loan for a €5 million fee in July 2023, with the club also taking on his €2 million salary and Sevilla's €3 million conditional payment to Wolverhampton. The move collapsed for financial reasons, and a late approach by A.C. Milan for a loan with obligatory purchase was rejected due to a lack of remaining forwards at Sevilla. On 16 August, in the 2023 UEFA Super Cup in Greece against Manchester City, Mir came on as a substitute for En-Nesyri near the end of a 1–1 draw, and scored his attempt in the penalty shootout, though his team lost. In January 2024, he turned down offers from foreign clubs in the hope of returning to Valencia; the transfer fell through, and manager Quique Sánchez Flores excluded him from the squad at Sevilla for the rest of the season, despite others' injuries and suspensions meaning that the club did not bring the maximum number of players to some matches.

=== Loans ===
On 11 July 2024, Mir returned to boyhood club Valencia on loan, with a buyout clause of €5 million. He publicly criticised Sevilla president José María Del Nido Carrasco and sporting director Victor Orta for their alleged roles in his previous failed transfers. He scored his first goal of the loan in his fifth game, concluding a 3–1 win away to Ejea in the second round of the Copa del Rey. Over 22 games of the season, most as a substitute, he did not score again until the last game of the league campaign, earning a 1–1 draw at Real Betis.

Mir moved on 17 August 2025 to fellow top-tier club Elche also on a temporary deal. After his debut, he scored in three consecutive games, from four shots and 229 minutes of action. The last of these goals was a direct free kick on 12 September in a 2–2 draw on his return to Sevilla, and the crowd at the Ramón Sánchez-Pizjuán Stadium jeered his celebration. On 1 March 2026, Espanyol's Omar El Hilali reported that Mir had allegedly made racial comments towards him. Mir reportedly said "You came in a small boat", a reference to illegal immigrants and asylum seekers. El Hilali triggered La Liga's anti-racism protocol following the alleged racial insult. After recording eight goals from 29 games over all competitions, Mir was absent for the final month of the season; there were reports that despite their relegation fight, Elche were avoiding contractual clauses that would mean his permanent signing.

On 4 August 2026, Mir was loaned for the final year of his Sevilla contract to Aris, on a deal that would then see him join the Greek club until June 2028. Due to his conviction, he required permission from the court to move abroad, and had to register at the Spanish consulate in Thessaloniki. By the middle of November, he had played 13 games in the league and cup without scoring, and was regularly a substitute.

== International career ==
On 29 June 2021, Mir was named in the 22-man squad for the 2020 Summer Olympics by manager Luis de la Fuente. On 31 July, came on in injury time and scored the equaliser against the Ivory Coast to take their quarter-final to extra-time, in which he added two further goals to complete a hat-trick as Spain won 5–2. In the final on 7 August, he came on as a 104th-minute substitute for Mikel Oyarzabal in a 2–1 loss to Brazil.

== Personal life ==
Mir, who idolised German forward Mario Gómez, is the son of former defender Magín Mir, whose clubs included RCD Mallorca and Murcia. He is a cousin of artistic gymnast Nicolau Mir.

After he won his Olympic silver medal in 2021, the football ground in Mir's childhood village of Javalí Nuevo was named after him. Following his conviction, the council in Murcia said the name would be removed if his appeal failed.

On 15 June 2026, Mir was sentenced to 8½ years in prison for sexual assault (seven years) and bodily harm (eighteen months). The offences took place at his home in Bétera, Province of Valencia, on 1 September 2024. The prosecutor said that he would not enter prison until the end of appeals.

== Career statistics ==
As of match played 22 April 2026

Appearances and goals by club, season and competition
Club	Season	League			National cup (Note: Includes Copa del Rey, FA Cup)		League cup (Note: Includes EFL Cup)		Europe		Other		Total	
Club	Season	Division	Apps	Goals	Apps	Goals	Apps	Goals	Apps	Goals	Apps	Goals	Apps	Goals
Valencia B	2014–15	Segunda División B	4	1	—		—		—		—		4	1
Valencia B	2015–16	Segunda División B	2	0	—		—		—		—		2	0
Valencia B	2016–17	Segunda División B	35	9	—		—		—		—		35	9
Valencia B	2017–18	Segunda División B	19	15	—		—		—		—		19	15
Valencia B	Total		60	25	—		—		—		—		60	25
Valencia	2015–16	La Liga	0	0	1	0	—		—		—		1	0
Valencia	2016–17	La Liga	2	0	3	0	—		—		—		5	0
Valencia	Total		2	0	4	0	—		—		—		6	0
Wolverhampton Wanderers	2017–18	Championship	2	0	2	0	—		—		—		4	0
Wolverhampton Wanderers	2018–19	Premier League	0	0	0	0	0	0	—		—		0	0
Wolverhampton Wanderers	Total		2	0	2	0	0	0	—		—		4	0
Las Palmas (loan)	2018–19	Segunda División	30	7	0	0	—		—		—		30	7
Nottingham Forest (loan)	2019–20	Championship	11	0	0	0	2	0	—		—		13	0
Huesca (loan)	2019–20	Segunda División	18	9	0	0	—		—		—		18	9
Huesca (loan)	2020–21	La Liga	38	13	1	3	—		—		—		39	16
Huesca (loan)	Total		56	22	1	3	—		—		—		57	25
Sevilla	2021–22	La Liga	34	10	4	2	—		9 (Note: Six appearances and one goal in UEFA Champions League, three appearances in UEFA Europa League)	1	—		47	13
Sevilla	2022–23	La Liga	26	6	4	1	—		6 (Note: Three appearances and one goal in UEFA Champions League, three appearances in UEFA Europa League)	1	—		36	8
Sevilla	2023–24	La Liga	15	2	4	1	—		2 (Note: Appearances in UEFA Champions League)	0	1 (Note: Appearance in UEFA Super Cup)	0	22	3
Sevilla	Total		75	18	12	4	—		17	2	1	0	105	24
Valencia (loan)	2024–25	La Liga	20	1	2	1	—		—		—		22	2
Elche (loan)	2025–26	La Liga	27	8	2	0	—		—		—		29	8
Career total			283	81	23	8	2	0	17	2	1	0	326	88

== Honours ==
Huesca

- Segunda División: 2019–20

Sevilla

- UEFA Europa League: 2022–23

Spain U21

- UEFA European Under-21 Championship: 2019

Spain U23

- Summer Olympics Silver Medal: 2020
