= Antonio Notario =

Spanish former professional footballer (born 1972)

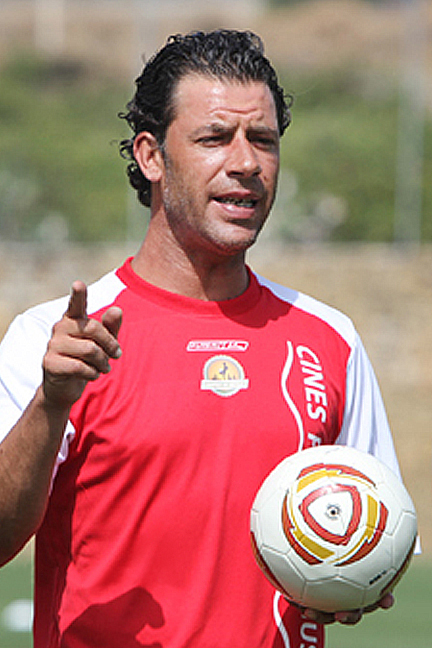
- Notario in June 2013

Personal information
- Full name: Antonio Notario Caro
- Date of birth: 19 November 1972 (age 53)
- Place of birth: Mataró, Spain
- Height: 1.80 m (5 ft 11 in)
- Position: Goalkeeper

Youth career
- Granada

Senior career*
Years	Team	Apps	(Gls)
1990–1993	Granada	75	(0)
1993–1994	Valencia B	17	(0)
1994–1995	Murcia	18	(0)
1995–1996	Poli Almería	2	(0)
1996–1997	Guadix	37	(0)
1997–2000	Granada	108	(0)
2000–2006	Sevilla	124	(0)
2006–2008	Murcia	62	(0)
2008–2009	Celta	30	(0)
2009–2010	Albacete	13	(0)
Total		486	(0)

International career
1991	Spain U19	1	(0)
1991	Spain U23	1	(0)
- * Club domestic league appearances and goals

Antonio Notario Caro (born 19 November 1972) is a Spanish former professional footballer who played as a goalkeeper.

In a 20-year senior career – he did not reach La Liga or Segunda División until the age of 27 – he made 121 top-flight appearances in five seasons, representing mainly Sevilla. He added 108 games in the second tier.

== Club career ==
Notario was born in Mataró, Province of Barcelona, Catalonia. He played mostly with Andalusian clubs during his early career, beginning at Granada CF (two stints) then appearing for Valencia CF's reserves, Real Murcia CF, Polideportivo Almería and Guadix CF, all competing in the Segunda División B.

In summer 2000, Notario signed with Sevilla FC where he had his most successful spell, being promoted to La Liga in his first season and retaining first-choice status until 2005–06, with the arrival of Andrés Palop relegating him to the bench. He would, however, appear in eight matches in the side's victorious run in the UEFA Cup.

Notario achieved another top-flight promotion in 2006–07, having returned to Murcia 12 years after leaving. He also started most of the following campaign until new head coach Javier Clemente inserted Uruguayan Fabián Carini in his place, with the team being nonetheless relegated.

On 16 July 2008, Notario joined Segunda División's RC Celta de Vigo as a free agent. After a sole season – marred by disciplinary and contractual problems– the 36-year-old moved to Albacete Balompié in the same tier, agreeing to a one-year contract.

On 10 October 2009, Notario was involved in a punching session with former team Celta's David Català, at the end of the 1–1 draw at Balaídos. He was subsequently handed a four-match ban and, upon his return, found himself playing second-fiddle to Jesús Cabrero more often than not, being released at the end of the campaign and retiring subsequently.

== Career statistics ==
Appearances and goals by club, season and competition
Club	Season	League			Cup		Europe		Other		Total	
Club	Season	Division	Apps	Goals	Apps	Goals	Apps	Goals	Apps	Goals	Apps	Goals
Granada	1990–91	Segunda División B	13	0	1	0	—		—		14	0
Granada	1991–92	Segunda División B	25	0	—		—		—		25	0
Granada	1992–93	Segunda División B	37	0	6	0	—		4 (Note: Appearances in Segunda División B play-offs)	0	47	0
Granada	Total		75	0	7	0	—		4	0	86	0
Valencia B	1993–94	Segunda División B	17	0	—		—		—		17	0
Murcia	1994–95	Segunda División B	18	0	2	0	—		—		20	0
Poli Almería	1995–96	Segunda División B	2	0	—		—		—		2	0
Guadix	1996–97	Segunda División B	37	0	—		—		—		37	0
Granada	1997–98	Segunda División B	35	0	—		—		5	0	40	0
Granada	1998–99	Segunda División B	36	0	2	0	—		—		38	0
Granada	1999–2000	Segunda División B	37	0	—		—		6	0	43	0
Granada	Total		108	0	2	0	—		11	0	121	0
Sevilla	2000–01	Segunda División	29	0	0	0	—		—		29	0
Sevilla	2001–02	La Liga	37	0	1	0	—		—		38	0
Sevilla	2002–03	La Liga	37	0	6	0	—		—		43	0
Sevilla	2003–04	La Liga	9	0	0	0	—		—		9	0
Sevilla	2004–05	La Liga	10	0	6	0	1 (Note: Appearances in UEFA Cup)	0	—		17	0
Sevilla	2005–06	La Liga	2	0	2	0	8	0	—		12	0
Sevilla	Total		124	0	15	0	9	0	—		148	0
Murcia	2006–07	Segunda División	36	0	0	0	—		—		36	0
Murcia	2007–08	La Liga	26	0	1	0	—		—		27	0
Murcia	Total		62	0	1	0	—		—		63	0
Celta	2008–09	Segunda División	30	0	0	0	—		—		30	0
Albacete	2009–10	Segunda División	13	0	0	0	—		—		13	0
Career total			486	0	27	0	9	0	15	0	537	0

== Honours ==
Sevilla

- UEFA Cup: 2005–06
- Segunda División: 2000–01
