= Víctor Salas (footballer, born 1980) =

Spanish footballer

Personal information
- Full name: Víctor Salas Baños
- Date of birth: 16 June 1980 (age 46)
- Place of birth: Morón de la Frontera, Spain
- Height: 1.80 m (5 ft 11 in)
- Position: Midfielder

Youth career
- Morón
- Sevilla

Senior career*
Years	Team	Apps	(Gls)
1999–2000	Sevilla B	11	(1)
1999–2003	Sevilla	93	(6)
2004	Almería	20	(3)
2004–2007	Poli Ejido	108	(11)
2007–2009	Castellón	46	(1)
2009–2011	Ponferradina	51	(4)
2011–2012	Teruel	29	(3)
2012–2013	Coria	28	(5)
Total		386	(34)
- * Club domestic league appearances and goals

Víctor Salas Baños (born 16 June 1980) is a Spanish former footballer who played as a midfielder.

He amassed Segunda División totals of 208 matches and 17 goals during eight seasons, representing in the competition Sevilla, Almería, Poli Ejido, Castellón and Ponferradina. He appeared in La Liga with the first club.

== Football career ==
Born in Morón de la Frontera, Province of Seville, Salas made his professional debut with hometown club Sevilla FC, playing the full 90 minutes in a 0–2 away loss against Valencia CF on 4 December 1999. He appeared in 19 La Liga games in a relegation-ending season, then contributed with the same figures the following campaign in an immediate promotion.

After two-and-a-half more seasons where he could never impose himself as a starter, Salas moved in January 2004 to Andalusian neighbours UD Almería, in the second division. He then established his career with another side in the region, Polideportivo Ejido, appearing an average of 36 matches (second level also) per season.

Salas moved to CD Castellón in 2007, after his contract with Ejido was not renewed. After two more years in division two, with a poor personal output in his second, he dropped down to the third tier and signed with SD Ponferradina.

== Personal life ==
Salas' nephew Kike is also a footballer. A central defender, he was also part of the youth setup at Sevilla.
