= Hannibal Mejbri =

Tunisia international footballer (born 2003)

- Hannibal with Burnley in 2026

Personal information
- Full name: Hannibal Mejbri
- Date of birth: 21 January 2003 (age 23)
- Place of birth: Ivry-sur-Seine, France
- Height: 1.84 m (6 ft 0 in)
- Position: Midfielder

Team information
- Current team: Burnley
- Number: 28

Youth career
- 2009–2017: Paris FC
- 2017–2018: Boulogne-Billancourt
- 2018–2019: Monaco
- 2019–2021: Manchester United

Senior career*
Years	Team	Apps	(Gls)
2021–2024	Manchester United	8	(1)
2022–2023	→ Birmingham City (loan)	38	(1)
2024	→ Sevilla (loan)	6	(0)
2024–	Burnley	69	(2)

International career^{‡}
2018–2019	France U16	12	(1)
2019	France U17	3	(2)
2021–	Tunisia	48	(1)
Medal record
Men's football
Representing Tunisia
FIFA Arab Cup
Runner-up	2021
- * Club domestic league appearances and goals as of 15:08, 6 September 2026 (UTC) ‡ National team caps and goals as of 21:45, 26 June 2026 (UTC)

Hannibal Mejbri (Arabic: حَنِّبَعْل المجبري; born 21 January 2003), also known mononymously as Hannibal, is a professional footballer who plays as a midfielder for EFL Championship club Burnley. Born in France, he plays for the Tunisia national team.

Mejbri joined the Manchester United youth system in 2019 from Monaco. He had previously spent time at the Clairefontaine academy. He made his senior debut for the club in a Premier League game in May 2021. Mejbri spent the 2022–23 season on loan to Championship club Birmingham City; he was a regular in the side, and scored his first senior goal. Mejbri was sent on loan to La Liga club Sevilla in 2024 before joining Championship club Burnley later that year, which was promoted to the Premier League at the end of the 2024–25 season.

Born in France to Tunisian parents, Mejbri represented France at under-16 and under-17 levels. He made his senior international debut for Tunisia in 2021.

== Early life ==
Mejbri was born in Ivry-sur-Seine (suburban Paris), and grew up in the city's 20th arrondissement. He joined Paris FC in 2009. In 2016, it was reported that he was being scouted by several English clubs, including Manchester United, Manchester City, Liverpool and Arsenal, and spent time on trial with the latter. He also spent time studying at the prestigious INF Clairefontaine academy. His elder brother, Abderrahmen Mejbri, is a sporting coach working for the Vietnam national football team and Pho Hien FC, a Vietnamese youth development club.

== Club career ==
=== Early career ===
Despite interest from English clubs, Mejbri had a short spell with Boulogne-Billancourt, before joining Monaco in 2018 for a fee of €1 million. Although initially impressed by Monaco's youth development, Mejbri became disillusioned by the Monégasque club within a year of signing, with his parents claiming that the Ligue 1 side had breached contract agreements.

In 2019, he was being tracked by clubs across Europe, including the German, French and Spanish champions, Bayern Munich, Paris Saint-Germain and Barcelona respectively. Mejbri said that he was experiencing the "dark side of football" prior to signing with Manchester United and that he had not played football for nearly four months. Before signing, he was back home in Quartier des Amandiers and was training on his own with his sibling.

=== Manchester United ===
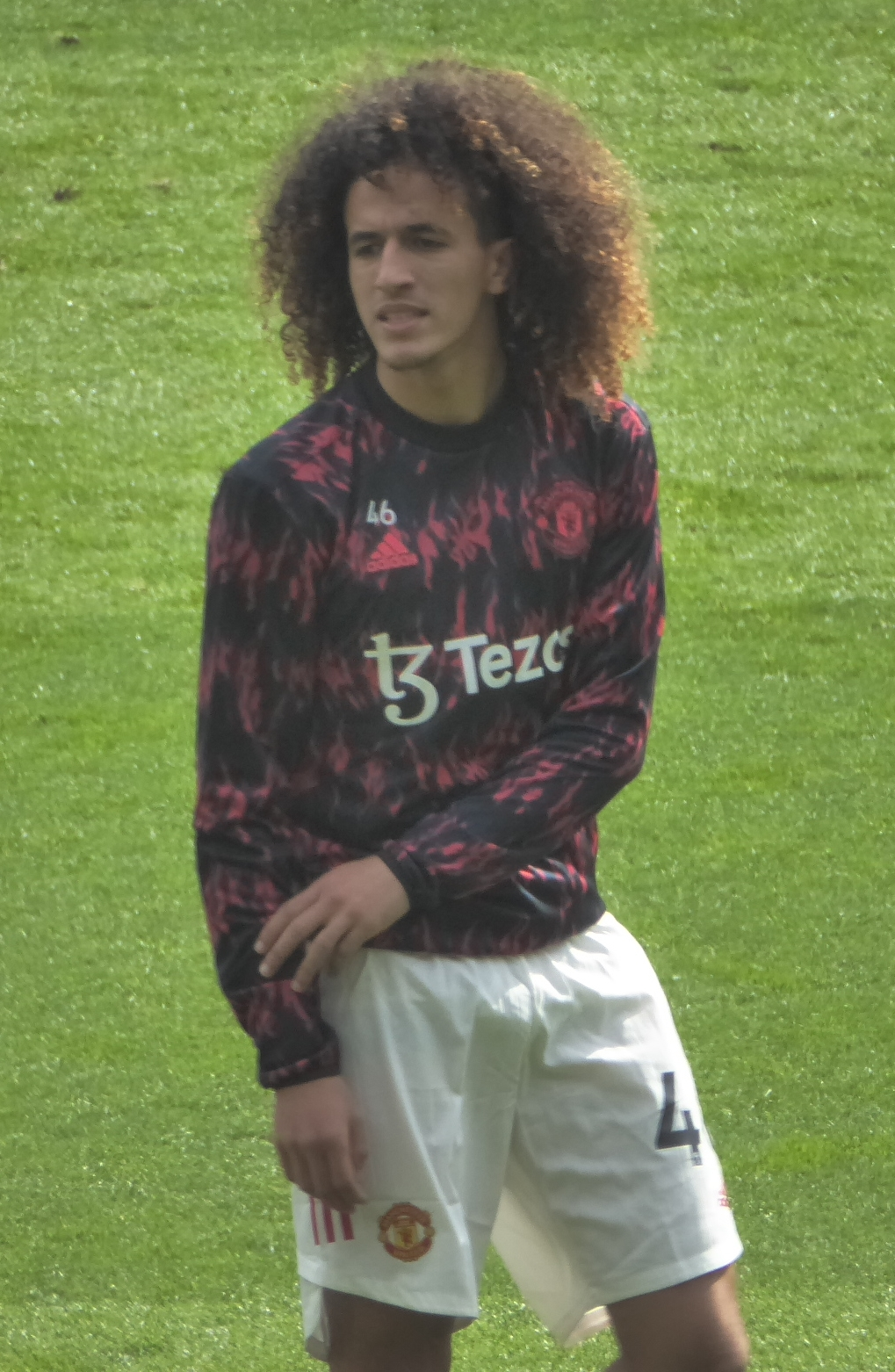
Mejbri warming up for Manchester United in 2022.

On 11 August 2019, Premier League side Manchester United announced on their website that they had reached an agreement with Monaco to sign Mejbri, with the youngster reportedly rejecting moves to other English clubs. The fee paid by the Manchester club was believed to be around €5 million, possibly rising to €10 million in add-ons.

Mejbri settled quickly into Manchester United's youth teams, progressing to the under-23 squad despite still being 17. Mejbri made his debut playing for the Manchester United U21 side against Salford City in the 2020–21 EFL Trophy on 9 September 2020. He signed a new contract with United in March 2021. On 20 May 2021, he won the Denzil Haroun Reserve Player of the Year award. made his senior debut three days later in a 2–1 win over Wolverhampton Wanderers in the final game of the Premier League season; he came on to replace Juan Mata in the 82nd minute.

==== Loan to Birmingham City ====
On 29 August 2022, Mejbri joined Championship club Birmingham City on loan for the 2022–23 season. On 10 February 2023, he scored his first senior goal, against West Bromwich Albion, with a surprise free-kick.

==== Return to Manchester United ====
On 16 September 2023, Mejbri scored his first Premier League goal for Manchester United in a 3–1 home defeat against Brighton.

==== Loan to Sevilla ====
On 15 January 2024, Manchester United sent Mejbri on loan to La Liga club Sevilla until the end of the season, with an optional buy-clause reported to be around €20 million.

=== Burnley ===
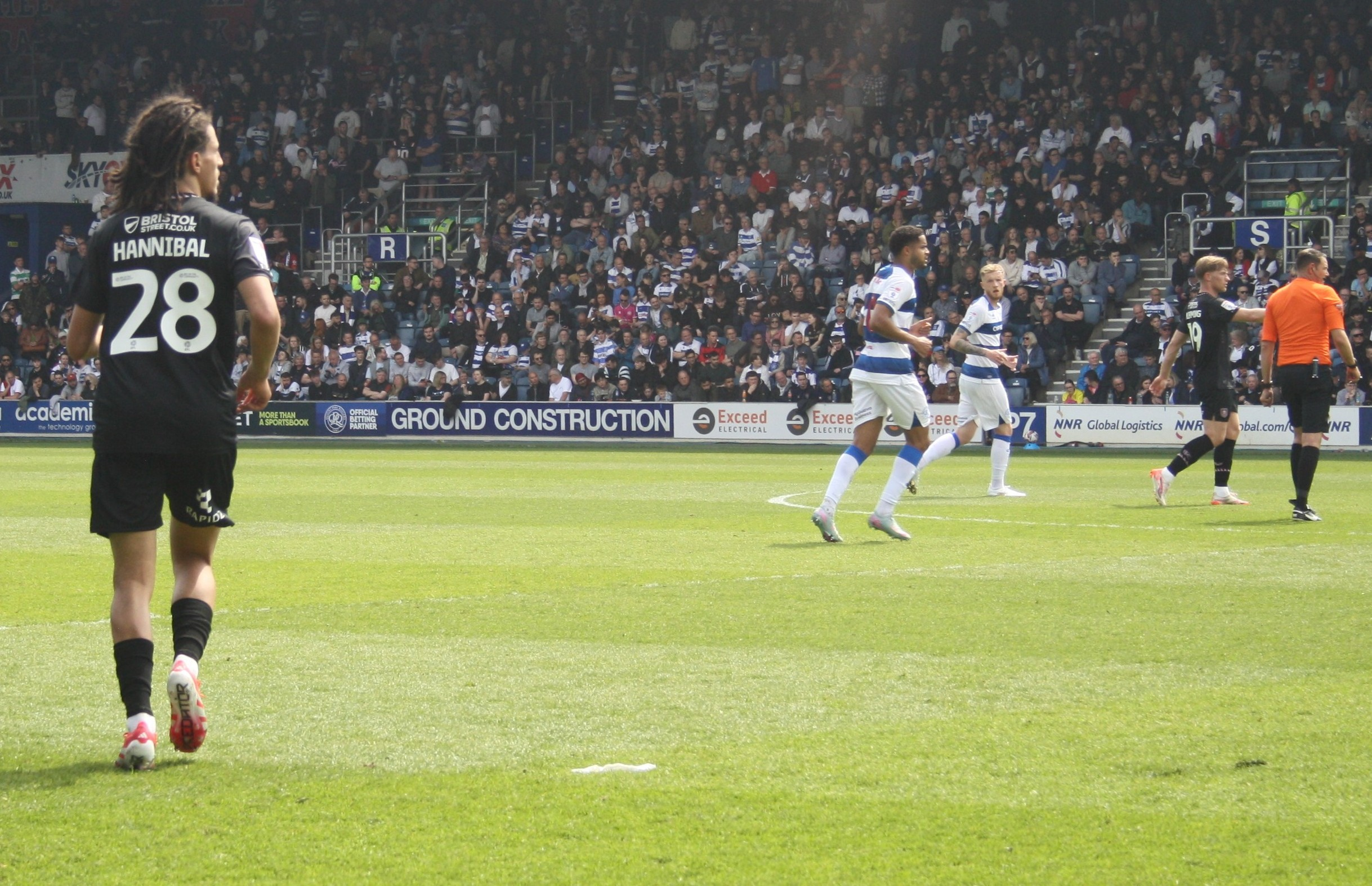
Mejbri playing for EFL Championship club Burnley.

On 28 August 2024, Mejbri joined EFL Championship club Burnley on a four-year contract. On 11 April 2025, he scored his first goal for Burnley during the 42nd match of the 2024–25 EFL Championship in a 2–1 win against Norwich City.

== International career ==
=== France ===
Mejbri made 12 appearances for France at under-16 level and three appearances at under-17 level.

He was first called for France at under-16 level in September 2018. He made his debut on 25 September 2018, in a 3–2 defeat to Denmark. He scored a goal on 22 April 2019, in a 4–0 win against Ivory Coast. In the same year, he was called up for the first time to the under-17 national team. He scored two goals on his debut for the team on 22 October 2019, in an 8–0 win against Gibraltar in 2020 UEFA European Under-17 Championship qualification.

=== Tunisia ===
In May 2021, Mejbri was called up for Tunisia national team for the first time, committing his international future to his parents' homeland. He earned his first cap on 5 June during a friendly game coming on as a second-half substitute against the DR Congo at the Hammadi Agrebi Stadium in Tunis, replacing Youssef Msakni in the 46th minute; the match ended in a 1–0 victory. In November 2021, Mondher Kebaier called him up to participate in the 2021 FIFA Arab Cup in Qatar. He provided his first assist against Mauritania in the first group match and was named man of the match in the third group match after a 1–0 win against the United Arab Emirates. He was again named man of the match in a 1–0 win the semi-final against Egypt. He played almost the entire 88 minutes of regular time in the final, before being replaced by Mohamed Ali Ben Romdhane. He was twice named African revelation of the year at the Africa d'Or awards, in 2021 and 2022.

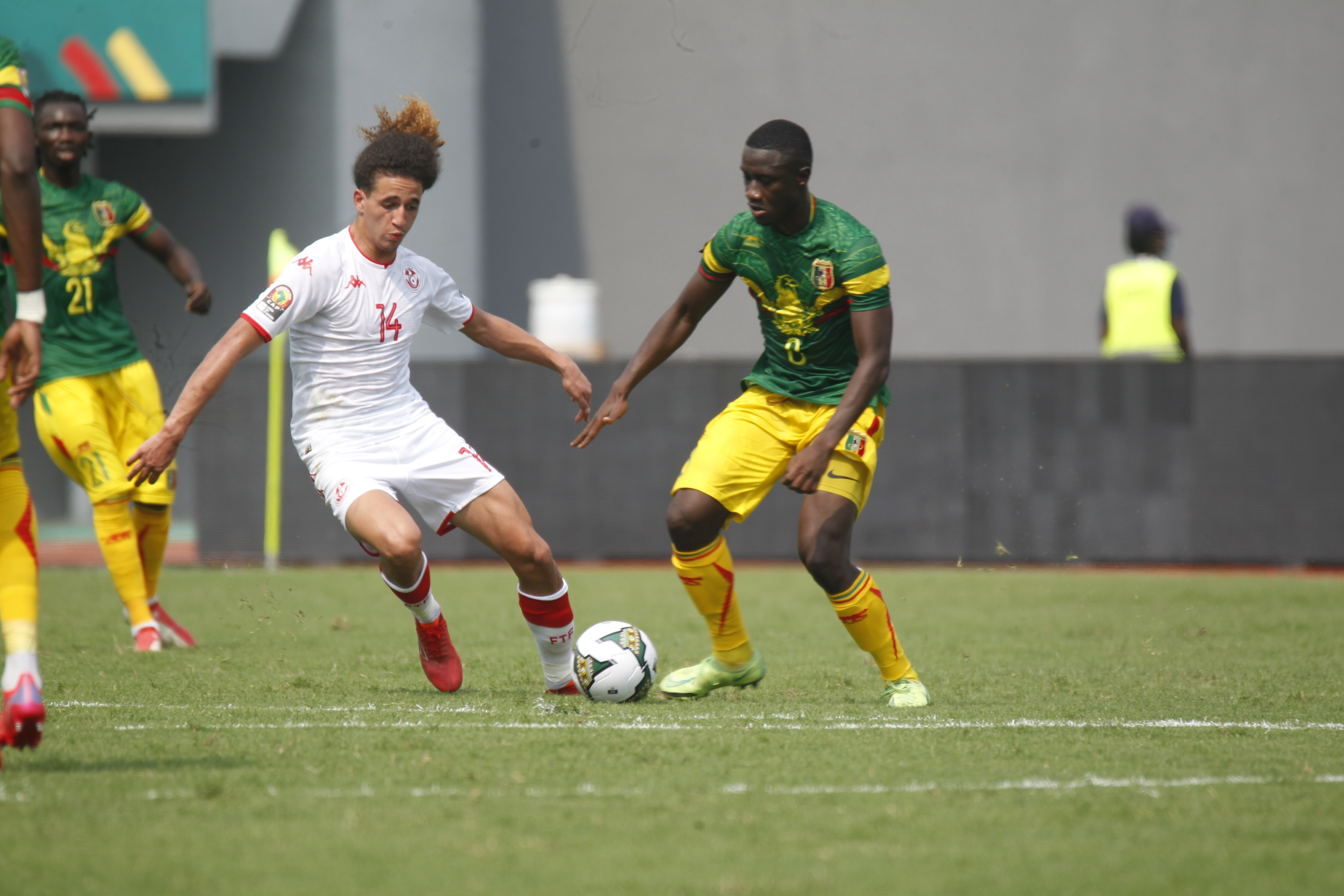
Mejbri playing for Tunisia against Mali at the 2021 Africa Cup of Nations.

In January 2022, Kebaier called him up to participate in the 2021 Africa Cup of Nations in Cameroon. He started the first match against Mali, which ended in a 0–1 defeat, and was substituted in the 46th minute. In the third match against Gambia, he played 22 minutes, replacing Hamza Rafia in the 68th minute. The team was ultimately eliminated in the quarterfinals by Burkina Faso 0–1. On 14 November 2022, he was selected by Jalel Kadri to participate in the 2022 FIFA World Cup in Qatar. On 22 November, he made his debut in a 0–0 draw, replacing Msakni in the 80th minute of Tunisia's Group D match against Denmark. Mejbri was not used in the next two group matches, and Tunisia was eliminated in the group round as third-placed team. Mejbri played in two matches in the 2023 Africa Cup of Nations qualification against Libya and winning both games 3–0 and 1–0.

On 28 December 2023, when Tunisia's squad for the 2023 Africa Cup of Nations was announced, Mejbri was at the center of a controversy when he was omitted from the list. Although Kadri was clear in explaining that Mejbri had expressed his desire not to play in the competition due to his difficult situation at Manchester United, some were not convinced by this argument.

On 15 May 2026, Mejbri was named in the Tunisia squad for the 2026 FIFA World Cup.

== Style of play ==
A composed midfielder on the ball, head of first-team development at Manchester United, Nicky Butt, compared Mejbri to his former teammates David Beckham and Roy Keane for his leadership skills. Coach Neil Ryan has also praised Mejbri, stating he has high hopes for the young playmaker. Mejbri is often described as an energetic, dynamic and determined player on the pitch. He does not hesitate to participate in defensive phases and to press the opponent, endowed with significant aggressiveness.

== Career statistics ==
=== Club ===
As of match played 5 September 2026

Appearances and goals by club, season and competition
Club	Season	League			National cup (Note: Includes FA Cup)		League cup (Note: Includes EFL Cup)		Europe		Other		Total	
Club	Season	Division	Apps	Goals	Apps	Goals	Apps	Goals	Apps	Goals	Apps	Goals	Apps	Goals
Manchester United U21	2019–20	—			—		—		—		0	0	0	0
Manchester United U21	2020–21	—			—		—		—		4 (Note: Appearance(s) in EFL Trophy)	1	4	1
Manchester United U21	2021–22	—			—		—		—		1	0	1	0
Manchester United U21	Total		—		—		—		—		5	1	5	1
Manchester United	2020–21	Premier League	1	0	0	0	0	0	0	0	—		1	0
Manchester United	2021–22	Premier League	2	0	0	0	0	0	0	0	—		2	0
Manchester United	2023–24	Premier League	5	1	1	0	2	0	2 (Note: Appearances in UEFA Champions League)	0	—		10	1
Manchester United	Total		8	1	1	0	2	0	2	0	—		13	1
Birmingham City (loan)	2022–23	Championship	38	1	3	0	—		—		—		41	1
Sevilla (loan)	2023–24	La Liga	6	0	0	0	—		—		—		6	0
Burnley	2024–25	Championship	37	1	1	0	1	0	—		—		39	1
Burnley	2025–26	Premier League	27	1	2	0	1	0	—		—		30	1
Burnley	2026–27	Championship	5	0	0	0	2	0	—		—		7	0
Burnley	Total		69	2	3	0	4	0	—		—		76	2
Career total			121	4	7	0	6	0	2	0	5	1	141	5

=== International ===
As of match played 25 June 2026

Appearances and goals by national team and year
National team	Year	Apps	Goals
Tunisia	2021	9	0
Tunisia	2022	11	0
Tunisia	2023	7	0
Tunisia	2024	3	0
Tunisia	2025	13	1
Tunisia	2026	5	0
Total		48	1

Scores and results list Tunisia's goal tally first.

List of international goals scored by Hannibal Mejbri
No.	Date	Venue	Opponent	Score	Result	Competition
1	13 October 2025	Hammadi Agrebi Stadium, Tunis, Tunisia	Namibia	2–0	3–0	2026 FIFA World Cup qualification

== Honours ==
Burnley

- EFL Championship runner-up: 2024–25

Tunisia

- FIFA Arab Cup runner-up: 2021

Individual

- Denzil Haroun Reserve Player of the Year: 2020–21
- African Revelation of the Year (Africa d'Or): 2021, 2022
- Birmingham City Goal of the Season: 2022–23
