= Federico Gattoni =

Argentine footballer (born 1999)

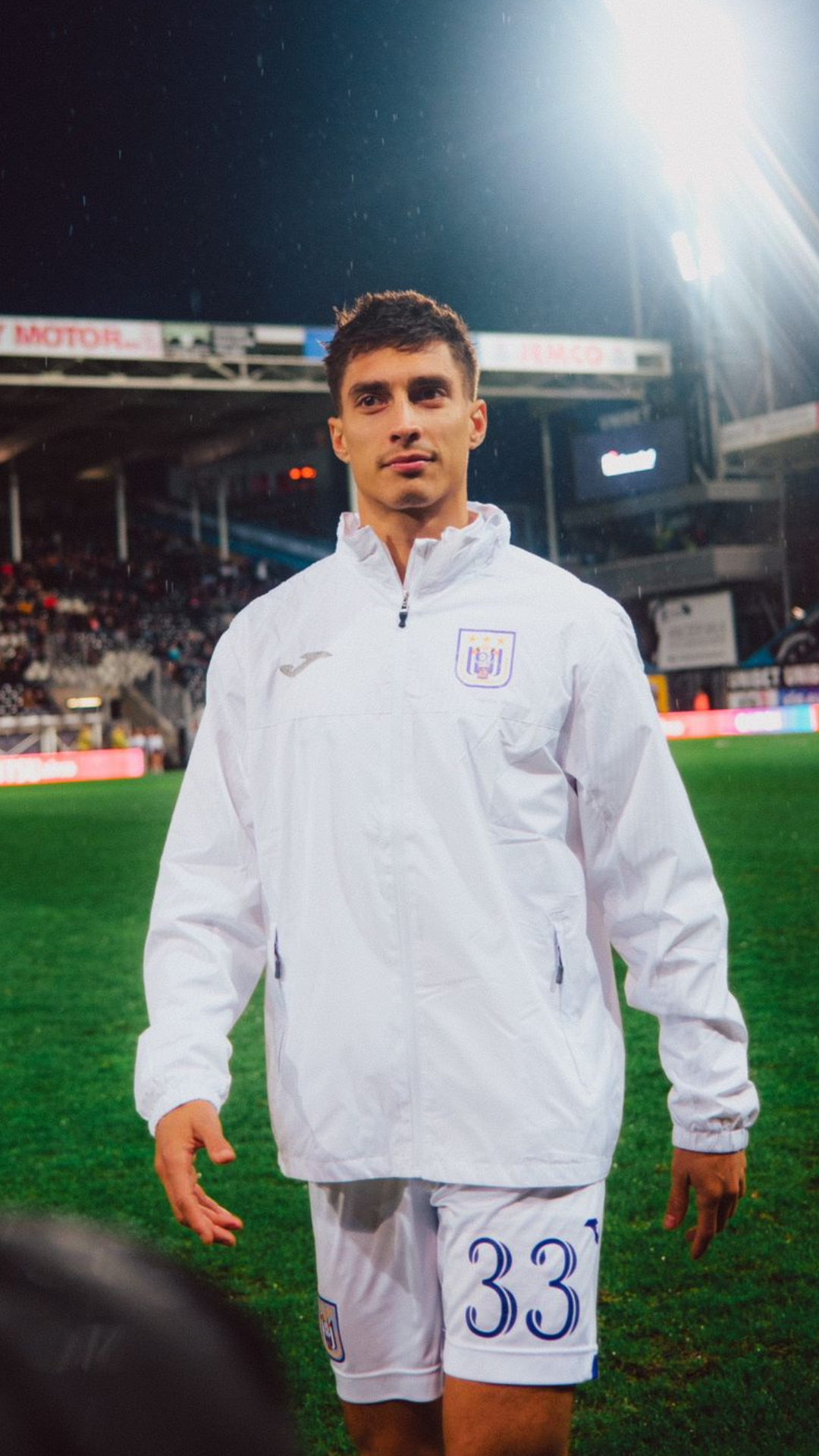
- Gattoni with Anderlecht in 2024

Personal information
- Full name: Federico Agustín Gattoni
- Date of birth: 16 February 1999 (age 27)
- Place of birth: Buenos Aires, Argentina
- Height: 1.83 m (6 ft 0 in)
- Position: Centre-back

Team information
- Current team: Ascoli
- Number: 32

Youth career
- Club Chacabuco
- 2006–2020: San Lorenzo

Senior career*
Years	Team	Apps	(Gls)
2020–2023	San Lorenzo	51	(2)
2023–2026	Sevilla	2	(0)
2024	→ Anderlecht (loan)	10	(0)
2024–2025	→ River Plate (loan)	6	(0)
2026–	Ascoli	2	(0)

International career
2019	Argentina U18		
- * Club domestic league appearances and goals as of 19 September 2026

Federico Agustín Gattoni (born 16 February 1999) is an Argentine professional footballer who plays as a centre-back for Serie B club Ascoli.

== Club career ==
Gattoni spent his early years at local team Club Chacabuco, before signing for San Lorenzo at the age of seven. He made his breakthrough into first-team football in October 2020, appearing for his senior debut in a goalless draw away to Argentinos Juniors in the Copa de la Liga Profesional on 31 October. He had been an unused substitute once in each of the preceding two years; for a 2018 Copa Sudamericana loss to Deportes Temuco and for a 2019 Primera División win over Godoy Cruz, with a debut being further delayed due to serious cruciate injuries suffered in both knees in 2017 and 2018.

Gattoni scored his first senior goal on 14 November 2020 against Aldosivi.

He made his debut for Sevilla in a 1–2 loss against Valencia CF on the opening day of the 2023-24 La Liga season.

In January 2024, Gattoni joined Belgian Pro League club Anderlecht on loan for the remainder of the season.

On 3 July 2024, Gattoni joined River Plate on loan with the option to buy.

== International career ==
Gattoni was called up to train with the Argentine senior squad during a tour of Asia/Oceania in June 2017. Two years later, he represented his nation at the 2018 COTIF Tournament; which they won.

== Career statistics ==
As of match played 6 December 2023

Appearances and goals by club, season and competition
Club	Season	League			National cup		League cup		Continental		Other		Total	
Club	Season	Division	Apps	Goals	Apps	Goals	Apps	Goals	Apps	Goals	Apps	Goals	Apps	Goals
San Lorenzo	2018–19	Argentine Primera División	0	0	0	0	0	0	0	0	—		0	0
San Lorenzo	2019–20	Argentine Primera División	0	0	0	0	10	1	—		—		10	1
San Lorenzo	2021	Argentine Primera División	7	0	0	0	9	1	6 (Note: Three appearances in Copa Libertadores, three appearances in Copa Sudamericana)	0	—		22	1
San Lorenzo	2022	Argentine Primera División	25	1	1	0	11	3	—		—		37	4
San Lorenzo	2023	Argentine Primera División	19	1	1	0	0	0	5 (Note: Appearances in Copa Sudamericana)	1	—		25	2
San Lorenzo	Total		51	2	2	0	30	5	11	1	—		94	8
Sevilla	2023–24	La Liga	2	0	2	1	—		0	0	0	0	4	1
Anderlecht (loan)	2023–24	Belgian Pro League	4	0	0	0	0	0	0	0	6	0	10	0
River Plate	2024	Argentine Primera División	6	0	0	0	0	0	0	0	—		6	0
River Plate	2025	Argentine Primera División	0	0	1	0	0	0	—		—		1	0
River Plate	Total		6	0	1	0	0	0	0	0	—		7	0
Career total			63	2	5	1	30	5	11	1	6	0	115	9

== Honours ==
Argentina U18

- COTIF Tournament: 2018
