= Kike Salas =

Spanish footballer (born 2002)

Personal information
- Full name: Enrique Jesús Salas Valiente
- Date of birth: 23 April 2002 (age 24)
- Place of birth: Morón de la Frontera, Spain
- Height: 1.85 m (6 ft 1 in)
- Position: Centre-back

Team information
- Current team: Sevilla
- Number: 4

Youth career
- 2013–2021: Sevilla

Senior career*
Years	Team	Apps	(Gls)
2021	Sevilla C	1	(0)
2021–2022	Sevilla B	31	(1)
2022–	Sevilla	97	(11)
2023	→ Tenerife (loan)	7	(0)

International career^{‡}
2024–2025	Spain U21	4	(0)
- * Club domestic league appearances and goals as of 21 November 2026 ‡ National team caps and goals as of 19 November 2024

Enrique Jesús "Kike" Salas Valiente (born 23 April 2002) is a Spanish professional footballer who plays as a centre-back for La Liga club Sevilla.

== Club career ==
Born in Morón de la Frontera, Seville, Andalusia, Salas joined Sevilla FC's youth setup in 2013, aged 11. He made his senior debut with the reserves on 10 January 2021, coming on as a half-time substitute for Juan María Alcedo in a 3–1 Segunda División B away loss against Yeclano Deportivo.

On 27 April 2021, while still a youth, Salas renewed his contract until 2024. He subsequently established himself as a regular for the B-side, and scored his first senior goal on 9 January 2022, in a 1–0 Primera División RFEF home win over Real Balompédica Linense.

Salas made his first team – and La Liga – debut on 10 September 2022, starting in a 3–2 away win over RCD Espanyol. The following 31 January, he signed a contract extension with Sevilla through to 2026, and joined Segunda División club CD Tenerife on loan for the remainder of the season.

Upon returning, Salas started to feature regularly in the main squad of the Nervionenses, and was definitely promoted to it on 31 January 2024, being assigned the number 2 jersey.

== Career statistics ==
=== Club ===
As of match played 21 November 2026

Appearances and goals by club, season and competition
Club	Season	League			Copa del Rey		Europe		Total	
Club	Season	Division	Apps	Goals	Apps	Goals	Apps	Goals	Apps	Goals
Sevilla	2022–23	La Liga	6	1	2	0	2 (Note: Appearances in UEFA Champions League)	0	10	1
Sevilla	2023–24	La Liga	23	3	3	0	2	0	28	3
Sevilla	2024–25	La Liga	31	3	2	0	—		33	3
Sevilla	2025–26	La Liga	26	2	2	1	—		28	3
Sevilla	2026–27	La Liga	11	2	0	0	—		11	2
Sevilla	Total		97	11	9	1	4	0	110	12
Tenerife (loan)	2022–23	Segunda División	7	0	—		—		7	0
Career total			104	11	9	1	4	0	117	12

== Personal life ==
Salas' uncle Víctor was also a footballer. A midfielder, he too was groomed at Sevilla. In January 2025, he was arrested for investigation on suspicion of deliberately obtaining yellow cards in order to benefit his friends in sports betting schemes.
