= Loïc Badé =

French footballer (born 2000)

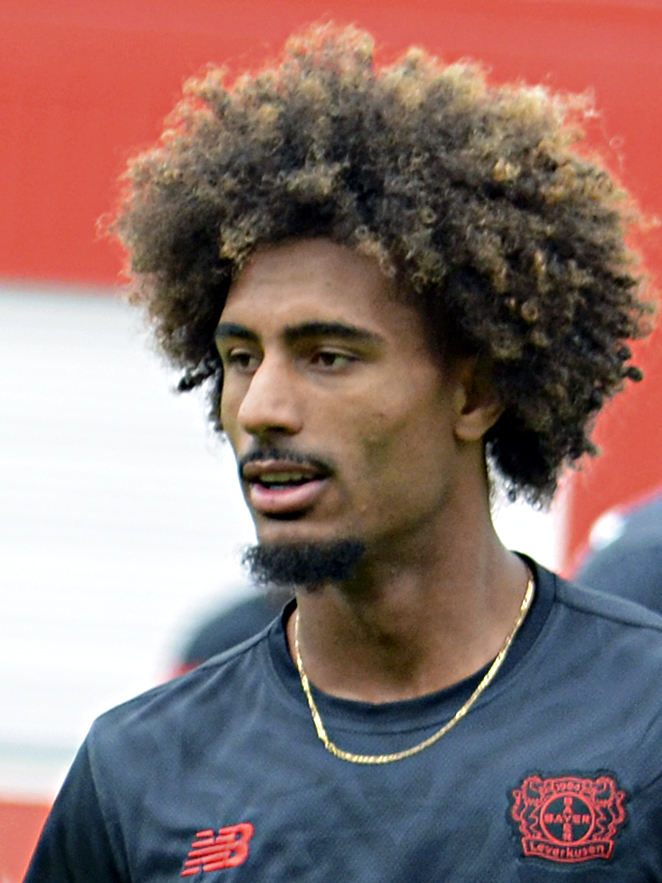
- Badé with Bayer Leverkusen in 2025

Personal information
- Full name: Loïc Séri Badé
- Date of birth: 11 April 2000 (age 26)
- Place of birth: Sèvres, France
- Height: 1.91 m (6 ft 3 in)
- Position: Centre-back

Team information
- Current team: Bayer Leverkusen
- Number: 5

Youth career
- 2007–2014: Antony Sports
- 2014–2015: Boulogne-Billancourt
- 2015–2017: Paris FC
- 2017–2018: Le Havre

Senior career*
Years	Team	Apps	(Gls)
2018–2020	Le Havre II	30	(3)
2020	Le Havre	7	(0)
2020–2021	Lens	31	(0)
2021–2023	Rennes	15	(0)
2022–2023	→ Nottingham Forest (loan)	0	(0)
2023	→ Sevilla (loan)	19	(1)
2023–2025	Sevilla	60	(1)
2025–	Bayer Leverkusen	26	(0)

International career^{‡}
2021–2023	France U21	6	(0)
2024	France Olympic	8	(1)
2025–	France	1	(0)
Medal record
Men's football
Representing France
UEFA Nations League
Third place	2025 Germany
Olympic Games
Silver medal – second place	Paris 2024	Team
- * Club domestic league appearances and goals as of 25 October 2026 ‡ National team caps and goals as of 8 June 2025

Loïc Séri Badé (French pronunciation: [lɔik bade]; born 11 April 2000) is a French professional footballer who plays as a centre-back for Bundesliga club Bayer Leverkusen and the France national team.

== Personal life ==
Badé was born in Sèvres, Hauts-de-Seine, and is of Ivorian descent.

== Club career ==
=== Le Havre ===
On 30 December 2016, Badé joined Le Havre from the youth academy of Paris FC. He made his professional debut with Le Havre in a 1–0 Ligue 2 win over Niort on 10 January 2020. He signed his first professional contract with Lens on 20 June 2020.

=== Rennes ===
On 5 July 2021, Badé joined Rennes on five-year deal. He scored his first career goal on 4 November 2021 against Mura in the UEFA Europa Conference League.

==== Nottingham Forest loan ====
On 1 September 2022, Badé joined Premier League side Nottingham Forest on a season-long loan, with the club holding an option to make the loan permanent. On 3 January 2023, Badé's loan to Nottingham Forest was terminated. He left Forest without making a single appearance for the club.

=== Sevilla ===
On 4 January 2023, Badé joined La Liga side Sevilla until the end of the season with an option-to-buy. He contributed to the team's triumph in the UEFA Europa League, notably scoring in a 3–0 win over Manchester United in the quarter-finals. After making twenty-seven appearances and scoring two goals for the club across six months, Sevilla signed Badé on a permanent deal.

=== Bayer Leverkusen ===
On 21 August 2025, Badé signed for Bundesliga club Bayer Leverkusen on a deal until 2030.

== International career ==
Badé made his debut for the France U21 national team in a 1–1 draw against the Faroe Islands on 6 September 2021.

On 1 September 2024, Badé received his first call-up to the France national team for two UEFA Nations League matches after Wesley Fofana pulled out due to injury.

On 8 June 2025, Badé made his international debut for France in a 2-0 win over Germany after Kylian Mbappe's & Michael Olise's goals in the 2025 UEFA Nations League Finals third-place play-off.

== Career statistics ==
=== Club ===
As of match played 25 October 2026

Appearances and goals by club, season and competition
Club	Season	League			National cup (Note: Includes Coupe de France, Copa del Rey, DFB-Pokal)		Europe		Other		Total	
Club	Season	Division	Apps	Goals	Apps	Goals	Apps	Goals	Apps	Goals	Apps	Goals
Le Havre II	2017–18	CFA	3	0	—		—		—		3	0
Le Havre II	2018–19	CFA	17	0	—		—		—		17	0
Le Havre II	2019–20	CFA	10	3	—		—		—		10	3
Le Havre II	Total		30	3	—		—		—		30	3
Le Havre	2019–20	Ligue 2	7	0	0	0	—		—		7	0
Lens	2020–21	Ligue 1	31	0	2	0	—		—		33	0
Rennes	2021–22	Ligue 1	14	0	2	0	5 (Note: Appearances in UEFA Europa Conference League)	1	—		21	1
Rennes	2022–23	Ligue 1	1	0	0	0	0	0	—		1	0
Rennes	Total		15	0	2	0	5	1	—		22	1
Nottingham Forest (loan)	2022–23	Premier League	0	0	0	0	—		—		0	0
Sevilla (loan)	2022–23	La Liga	19	1	2	0	6 (Note: Appearances in UEFA Europa League)	1	—		27	2
Sevilla	2023–24	La Liga	28	0	2	0	2 (Note: Appearances in UEFA Champions League)	0	1 (Note: Appearance in UEFA Super Cup)	0	33	0
Sevilla	2024–25	La Liga	32	1	1	0	—		—		33	1
Sevilla	Sevilla total		79	2	5	0	8	1	1	0	93	3
Bayer Leverkusen	2025–26	Bundesliga	23	0	3	0	8	0	—		34	0
Bayer Leverkusen	2026–27	Bundesliga	3	0	1	0	3	0	—		7	0
Bayer Leverkusen	Total		26	0	4	0	11	0	—		41	0
Career total			188	5	13	0	23	2	1	0	225	7

=== International ===
As of match played 8 June 2025

Appearances and goals by national team and year
National team	Year	Apps	Goals
France	2025	1	0
Total		1	0

== Honours ==
Sevilla

- UEFA Europa League: 2022–23

France U23

- Summer Olympics silver medal: 2024

France

- UEFA Nations League third place: 2024–25

Orders

- Knight of the National Order of Merit: 2024
