= 2000–01 Sevilla FC season =

Sevilla FC
2000–01 season
- President: Roberto Alés García
- Head coach: Joaquín Caparrós
- Stadium: Ramón Sánchez Pizjuán
- Segunda División: 1st
- Copa del Rey: Round of 64
- Top goalscorer: League: Nicolás Olivera (16); All: Nicolás Olivera (16)
- Biggest win: Sevilla 4–0 Compostela
- Biggest defeat: Sporting Gijón 3–0 Sevilla

The 2000–01 Sevilla Fútbol Club season was the club's 111th season in existence and the club's first season back in the second division of Spanish football. In addition to the domestic league, Sevilla participated in this season's edition of the Copa del Rey.

== Transfers ==
=== In ===
No.	Pos	Player	Transferred from	Fee	Date	Source
	FW	(Spain) Diego Ribera	(Spain) Córdoba	€300k	1 July 2000	
	FW	(Spain) Puli	(Spain) Atlético Ceuta	€36k	1 July 2000	
	DF	(Spain) Loren	(Spain) Salamanca	€30k	1 July 2000	
	DF	(Spain) César Caneda	(Spain) Salamanca	€30k	1 July 2000	
	MF	(Portugal) José Taira	(Spain) Salamanca	€30k	1 July 2000	
	DF	(Spain) David Castedo	(Spain) Mallorca	Free	1 July 2000	
	DF	(Spain) Pablo Alfaro	(Spain) CP Mérida	Free	1 July 2000	
	MF	(Spain) Javier Casquero	(Spain) Atlético Madrid B	Free	1 July 2000	

=== Out ===
No.	Pos	Player	Transferred to	Fee	Date	Source
	DF	(Spain) Carlos Marchena	(Portugal) Benfica	€5.70m	1 July 2000	
	MF	(Spain) Jesuli	(Spain) Celta Vigo	€5.10m	1 July 2000	
	FW	(Spain) Juan Carlos	(Spain) Atlético Madrid	€3.60m	1 July 2000	
	MF	(Greece) Vasilios Tsiartas	(Greece) AEK Athens	€3.50m	1 July 2000	
	DF	(Spain) Héctor Berenguel	(Spain) Deportivo La Coruña	Free	1 July 2000	
	DF	(Bosnia and Herzegovina) Mirsad Hibić	(Spain) Atlético Madrid	Free	1 July 2000	
	MF	(Spain) Patri	(Spain) Poli Ejido	Free	1 July 2000	

== Pre-season and friendlies ==
Win Draw Loss Fixtures

21 July 2000 Friendly	Farense (Portugal)	0–0	(Spain) Sevilla
CEST (UTC+2)

22 July 2000 Friendly	Ayamonte (Spain)	0–3	(Spain) Sevilla
CEST (UTC+2)

28 July 2000 Friendly	Pilas (Spain)	1–2	(Spain) Sevilla
CEST (UTC+2)

2 August 2000 Friendly	San Fernando (Spain)	1–2	(Spain) Sevilla
CEST (UTC+2)

5 August 2000 Friendly	Iliturgi (Spain)	0–3	(Spain) Sevilla
CEST (UTC+2)

9 August 2000 Friendly	Sevilla (Spain)	0–0	(Portugal) Farense	Seville
CEST (UTC+2)				Stadium: Ramón Sánchez Pizjuán; Attendance: 10,000

11 August 2000 Friendly	Constantina (Spain)	1–14	(Spain) Sevilla
CEST (UTC+2)

15 August 2000 Friendly	Jaén (Spain)	1–1	(Spain) Sevilla
CEST (UTC+2)

19 August 2000 Friendly	Rota (Spain)	1–4	(Spain) Sevilla
CEST (UTC+2)

23 August 2000 Friendly	Sevilla (Spain)	2–3	(Spain) Racing Santander	Seville
CEST (UTC+2)				Stadium: Ramón Sánchez Pizjuán; Attendance: 12,000

29 August 2000 Friendly	Utrera (Spain)	2–3	(Spain) Sevilla
CEST (UTC+2)

== Competitions ==
=== Overview ===
Competition	First match	Last match	Starting round	Final position	Record							
Competition	First match	Last match	Starting round	Final position	Pld	W	D	L	GF	GA	GD	Win %
Segunda División	3 September 2000	16 June 2001	Matchday 1	Winners	42	23	11	8	66	39	+27	54.76
Copa del Rey	13 December 2000		Round of 64	Round of 64	1	0	0	1	1	2	−1	0.00
Total					43	23	11	9	67	41	+26	53.49

Source: Competitions

=== Segunda División ===
==== League table ====
Pos	Team	Pld	W	D	L	GF	GA	GD	Pts	Promotion or relegation
1	Sevilla (C, P)	42	23	11	8	66	39	+27	80	Promotion to La Liga
2	Betis (P)	42	21	12	9	49	32	+17	75	Promotion to La Liga
3	Tenerife (P)	42	21	11	10	58	32	+26	74	Promotion to La Liga
4	Atlético Madrid	42	21	11	10	59	39	+20	74	
5	Albacete	42	18	12	12	46	40	+6	66	

Rules for classification: 1st points; 2nd head-to-head points; 3rd head-to-head goal difference; 4th head-to-head goals scored; 5th goal difference; 6th number of goals scored; 7th Fair-play points
(C) Champions; (P) Promoted

==== Results summary ====
Overall								Home						Away					
Pld	W	D	L	GF	GA	GD	Pts	W	D	L	GF	GA	GD	W	D	L	GF	GA	GD
42	23	11	8	66	39	+27	80	14	6	1	43	16	+27	9	5	7	23	23	0

Source: Segunda División

==== Results by round ====
Round	1	2	3	4	5	6	7	8	9	10	11	12	13	14	15	16	17	18	19	20	21	22	23	24	25	26	27	28	29	30	31	32	33	34	35	36	37	38	39	40	41	42
Ground	H	A	A	H	A	H	A	H	A	H	A	H	A	H	A	H	A	H	A	H	A	A	H	H	A	H	A	H	A	H	A	H	A	H	A	H	A	H	A	H	A	H
Result	W	W	W	W	D	W	L	D	L	D	L	W	W	W	L	W	W	D	W	W	L	D	W	D	W	W	L	D	W	W	D	L	W	D	D	W	L	W	W	W	D	W
Position	3	2	1	1	1	1	1	2	3	3	6	2	2	2	2	2	2	2	1	1	1	3	1	3	1	1	1	1	1	1	1	1	1	1	1	1	1	1	1	1	1	1

Source: Segunda División
A = Away; H = Home; W = Win; D = Draw; L = Loss

==== Matches ====
3 September 2000 1	Sevilla	2–1	Murcia	Seville
CEST (UTC+2)				Stadium: Ramón Sánchez Pizjuán

10 September 2000 2	Salamanca	0–1	Sevilla	Salamanca
CEST (UTC+2)

16 September 2000 3	Elche	1–2	Sevilla	Elche
CEST (UTC+2)

24 September 2000 4	Sevilla	2–0	Lleida	Seville
CEST (UTC+2)				Stadium: Ramón Sánchez Pizjuán

30 September 2000 5	Leganés	1–1	Sevilla	Leganés
CEST (UTC+2)

8 October 2000 6	Sevilla	1–0	Albacetee	Seville
CEST (UTC+2)				Stadium: Ramón Sánchez Pizjuán

15 October 2000 7	Sporting Gijón	3–0	Sevilla	Gijón
CEST (UTC+2)

22 October 2000 8	Sevilla	1–1	Getafe	Seville
CEST (UTC+2)				Stadium: Ramón Sánchez Pizjuán

28 October 2000 9	Levante	2–0	Sevilla	Valencia
CEST (UTC+2)

1 November 2000 10	Sevilla	0–0	Recreativo de Huelva	Seville
CET (UTC+1)				Stadium: Ramón Sánchez Pizjuán

4 November 2000 11	Jaén	2–1	Sevilla	Jaén
CET (UTC+1)

12 November 2000 12	Sevilla	4–0	Compostela	Seville
CET (UTC+1)				Stadium: Ramón Sánchez Pizjuán

19 November 2000 13	Real Betis	1–3	Sevilla	Seville
CET (UTC+1)

26 November 2000 14	Sevilla	3–0	Racing Ferrol	Seville
CET (UTC+1)				Stadium: Ramón Sánchez Pizjuán

3 December 2000 15	Badajoz	2–0	Sevilla	Badajoz
CET (UTC+1)

10 December 2000 16	Sevilla	3–1	Atlético Madrid	Seville
CET (UTC+1)				Stadium: Ramón Sánchez Pizjuán

17 December 2000 17	Córdoba	0–1	Sevilla	Córdoba
CET (UTC+1)

20 December 2000 18	Sevilla	2–2	Universidad de Las Palmas	Seville
CET (UTC+1)				Stadium: Ramón Sánchez Pizjuán

7 January 2001 19	Tenerife	1–2	Sevilla	Santa Cruz de Tenerife
CET (UTC+1)

13 January 2001 20	Sevilla	3–0	Extremadura	Seville
CET (UTC+1)				Stadium: Ramón Sánchez Pizjuán

20 January 2001 21	Eibar	1–0	Sevilla	Eibar
CET (UTC+1)

28 January 2001 22	Murcia	1–1	Sevilla	Murcia
CET (UTC+1)

4 February 2001 23	Sevilla	2–0	Salamanca	Seville
CET (UTC+1)				Stadium: Ramón Sánchez Pizjuán

10 February 2001 24	Sevilla	1–1	Elche	Seville
CET (UTC+1)				Stadium: Ramón Sánchez Pizjuán

18 February 2001 25	Lleida	0–1	Sevilla	Lleida
CET (UTC+1)

25 February 2001 26	Sevilla	4–2	Leganés	Seville
CET (UTC+1)				Stadium: Ramón Sánchez Pizjuán

4 March 2001 27	Albacete	2–1	Sevilla	Albacete
CET (UTC+1)

10 March 2001 28	Sevilla	1–1	Sporting Gijón	Seville
CET (UTC+1)				Stadium: Ramón Sánchez Pizjuán

18 March 2001 29	Getafe	0–1	Sevilla	Getafe
CET (UTC+1)

25 March 2001 30	Sevilla	3–2	Levante	Seville
CET (UTC+1)				Stadium: Ramón Sánchez Pizjuán

1 April 2001 31	Recreativo de Huelva	1–1	Sevilla	Huelva
CEST (UTC+2)

7 April 2001 32	Sevilla	0–1	Jaén	Seville
CEST (UTC+2)				Stadium: Ramón Sánchez Pizjuán

14 April 2001 33	Compostela	0–2	Sevilla	Santiago de Compostela
CEST (UTC+2)

22 April 2001 34	Sevilla	1–1	Real Betis	Seville
CEST (UTC+2)				Stadium: Ramón Sánchez Pizjuán

29 April 2001 35	Racing Ferrol	1–1	Sevilla	Ferrol
CEST (UTC+2)

6 May 2001 36	Sevilla	5–2	Badajoz	Seville
CEST (UTC+2)				Stadium: Ramón Sánchez Pizjuán

12 May 2001 37	Atlético Madrid	2–0	Sevilla	Madrid
CEST (UTC+2)

20 May 2001 38	Sevilla	2–0	Córdoba	Seville
CEST (UTC+2)				Stadium: Ramón Sánchez Pizjuán

26 May 2001 39	Universidad de Las Palmas	1–3	Sevilla	Las Palmas
CEST (UTC+2)

3 June 2001 40	Sevilla	1–0	Tenerife	Seville
CEST (UTC+2)				Stadium: Ramón Sánchez Pizjuán

9 June 2001 41	Extremadura	1–1	Sevilla	Almendralejo
CEST (UTC+2)

16 June 2001 42	Sevilla	2–1	Eibar	Seville
CEST (UTC+2)				Stadium: Ramón Sánchez Pizjuán

=== Copa del Rey ===
13 December 2020 Round of 64	Xerez	2–1	Sevilla	Jerez de la Frontera
CET (UTC+1)				Stadium: Estadio Municipal de Chapín
