= Victor Orta =

Spanish football director (born 1978)

Víctor Orta
Personal information
- Date of birth: 28 December 1978 (age 47)
- Place of birth: Madrid, Spain

Managerial career
- Years: Team
- 2005–2006: Real Valladolid (sporting director)
- 2013–2014: Zenit Saint Petersburg (sporting director)
- 2014–2015: Elche (sporting director)
- 2015–2017: Middlesbrough (sporting director)
- 2017–2023: Leeds United (director of football)
- 2023–2025: Sevilla (sporting director)
- 2025–: Real Valladolid (sporting director)

Víctor Orta (born 28 December 1978) is a football executive who is currently sporting director of Spanish second tier club Real Valladolid.

== Early life ==
Orta is a native of Madrid, Spain.

== Career ==
=== Middlesbrough ===
On 19 December 2015, Orta became sporting director of Middlesbrough in the second division. Orta was responsible for developing a transfer policy that brought in key players such as Gastón Ramírez, Víctor Valdés, Patrick Bamford, Adama Traoré, and Alvaro Negredo. Middlesbrough under Orta would gain immediate promotion to the top-flight Premier League, having finished in 2nd place in the EFL Championship.

=== Leeds United ===
On 30 May 2017, Orta was hired by English second division side Leeds United, as Director of Football. Orta would bring in Argentine Marcelo Bielsa who transformed the football club on and off the field. Bielsa would gain promotion with Leeds in 2020 and finish 9th in the Premier League adopting a gung-ho, high-pressing style of play, unusual for a newly promoted side.

The following season would be less successful, as the majority of Orta's signings since promotion failed to live up to expectation. Orta looked to undermine Bielsa to gain greater control over future incomings and identified US coach Jesse Marcsh as a replacement. Bielsa's refusal to accept Harry Winks, Dele Alli and Donny Van de Beek in the January transfer window led to tension between them and he was sacked by Orta in February 2022, despite huge fan protests. Orta signed Max Wober, Georginio and Weston McKennie for Marsch, but all three struggled at PL level. Orta parted ways with Leeds United on 2 May 2023 shortly before relegation was confirmed.

=== Sevilla ===
On 1 July 2023, Orta was appointed as sporting director of Spanish top-flight club Sevilla. In Orta's first season at the club, he replaced existing head coach José Luis Mendilibar with Diego Alonso, a Uruguayan who had previously been in charge of the Uruguay national team, as well as an ill-fated spell as Inter Miami's inaugural head coach. Alonso however would only last two months and 14 games at Sevilla, owing to a record of seven losses, five draws, and just two wins. Orta then opted to replace Alonso with fellow Madrid native Quique Sánchez Flores. After winning his first match in charge of the club 3-0 away to Andalusian rivals Granada, Quique Flores would see out the rest of the season for Sevilla and the club would finish 14th in the league, its worst placing since gaining promotion to the top-flight in the 2000-01 season.

Quique Flores decided to part ways with Sevilla at the end of the 2023-24 season, and Orta would again be tasked with finding a new manager for the club. Orta next turned to Francisco García Pimienta, a Catalan formerly of Las Palmas and Barcelona Atlètic. Orta oversaw an overhaul of the club squad in Summer 2024, with high-profile exits such as Thomas Delaney, Erik Lamela, Sergio Ramos, Adnan Januzaj, Óscar, and Youssef En-Nesyri being replaced by the likes of Chidera Ejuke, Peque, Albert Sambi Lokonga, Saúl, and Kelechi Iheanacho. On June 4, 2025 Sevilla removed Orta from his position as sports director.

== Personal life ==
Orta has a son.
