= 2021–22 Sevilla FC season =

115th season in existence of Sevilla FC

Sevilla FC
2021–22 season
- President: José Castro Carmona
- Head coach: Julen Lopetegui
- Stadium: Ramón Sánchez Pizjuán
- La Liga: 4th
- Copa del Rey: Round of 16
- UEFA Champions League: Group stage
- UEFA Europa League: Round of 16
- Top goalscorer: League: Rafa Mir (10); All: Rafa Mir (13)
- Highest home attendance: 30,601 vs Levante (24 October 2021)
- Lowest home attendance: 13,962 vs Rayo Vallecano (15 August 2021)
- Biggest win: Sevilla 3–0 Rayo Vallecano
- Biggest defeat: West Ham United 2–0 Sevilla
| Home colours | Away colours | Third colours |

The 2021–22 season was the 115th season in the existence of Sevilla and the club's 21st consecutive season in the top flight of Spanish football. In addition to the domestic league, Sevilla also participated in this season's editions of the Copa del Rey, the UEFA Champions League and the UEFA Europa League.

== Players ==
As of 30 August 2021.

| No. | Player | Nat. | Position(s) | Date of birth (age) | Signed in | Contract ends | Signed from | Transfer fees | Apps. | Goals | Notes |
Goalkeepers
| 1 | Marko Dmitrović | (Serbia) | GK | 24 January 1992 (age 34) | 2021 | 2025 | (Spain) Eibar | Free transfer | 1 | 0 | |
| 13 | Yassine Bounou | (Morocco) | GK | 5 April 1991 (age 35) | 2020 | 2024 | (Spain) Girona | €4m | 71 | 1 | |
| 31 | Javi Díaz | (Spain) | GK | 15 May 1997 (age 29) | 2019 | 2022 | (Spain) Sevilla Atlético | Youth system | 1 | 0 | |
Defenders
| 2 | Gonzalo Montiel | (Argentina) | RB | 1 January 1997 (age 29) | 2021 | 2026 | (Argentina) River Plate | €11m | 0 | 0 | |
| 3 | Ludwig Augustinsson | (Sweden) | LB | 21 April 1994 (age 32) | 2021 | 2025 | (Germany) Werder Bremen | €5.5m | 0 | 0 | |
| 4 | Karim Rekik | (Netherlands) | CB | 2 December 1994 (age 31) | 2020 | 2025 | (Germany) Hertha BSC | €2m | 22 | 0 | |
| 16 | Jesús Navas | (Spain) | RB | 21 November 1985 (age 40) | 2017 | 2024 | (England) Manchester City | Free transfer | 563 | 36 | Captain |
| 19 | Marcos Acuña | (Argentina) | LB | 28 October 1991 (age 35) | 2020 | 2025 | (Portugal) Sporting CP | €10.5m | 37 | 1 | |
| 20 | Diego Carlos | (Brazil) | CB | 15 March 1993 (age 33) | 2019 | 2024 | (France) Nantes | €15m | 91 | 3 | |
| 23 | Jules Koundé | (France) | CB | 12 November 1998 (age 27) | 2019 | 2024 | (France) Bordeaux | €25m | 89 | 6 | |
Midfielders
| 6 | Nemanja Gudelj | (Serbia) | DM | 16 November 1991 (age 34) | 2019 | 2023 | (China) Guangzhou Evergrande | Free transfer | 82 | 0 | |
| 8 | Joan Jordán | (Spain) | CM | 6 July 1994 (age 32) | 2019 | 2027 | (Spain) Eibar | €14m | 97 | 4 | |
| 10 | Ivan Rakitić | (Croatia) | CM | 10 March 1988 (age 38) | 2020 | 2024 | (Spain) Barcelona | €1.5m | 199 | 40 | Second nationality: Switzerland |
| 18 | Thomas Delaney | (Denmark) | DM | 3 September 1991 (age 35) | 2021 | 2025 | (Germany) Borussia Dortmund | €6m | 0 | 0 | Second nationality: United States |
| 21 | Óliver Torres | (Spain) | CM | 10 November 1994 (age 32) | 2019 | 2024 | (Portugal) Porto | €11m | 84 | 6 | |
| 24 | Alejandro Gómez | (Argentina) | AM | 15 February 1988 (age 38) | 2021 | 2024 | (Italy) Atalanta | €5.5m | 23 | 3 | Second nationality: Italy |
| 25 | Fernando Reges | (Brazil) | DM | 25 July 1987 (age 39) | 2019 | 2024 | (Turkey) Galatasaray | €4.5m | 86 | 6 | Second nationality: Portugal |
Forwards
| 5 | Lucas Ocampos | (Argentina) | RW | 11 July 1994 (age 32) | 2019 | 2024 | (France) Marseille | €15m | 90 | 25 | |
| 7 | Suso | (Spain) | RW | 19 November 1993 (age 32) | 2020 | 2024 | (Italy) Milan | €21m | 67 | 6 | |
| 9 | Tecatito Corona | (Mexico) | RW | 6 January 1993 (age 33) | 2022 | 2025 | (Portugal) Porto | €3m | 0 | 0 | Second nationality: Portugal |
| 11 | Munir | (Morocco) | RW | 1 September 1995 (age 31) | 2019 | 2023 | (Spain) Barcelona | €1.05m | 88 | 22 | Second nationality: Spain |
| 12 | Rafa Mir | (Spain) | CF | 18 June 1997 (age 29) | 2021 | 2027 | (England) Wolverhampton Wanderers | €16m | 0 | 0 | |
| 15 | Youssef En-Nesyri | (Morocco) | CF | 1 June 1997 (age 29) | 2020 | 2025 | (Spain) Leganés | €20m | 78 | 30 | |
| 17 | Erik Lamela | (Argentina) | RW | 4 March 1992 (age 34) | 2021 | 2024 | (England) Tottenham Hotspur | Free transfer | 0 | 0 | Second nationality: Spain |
| 22 | Anthony Martial | (France) | CF | 5 December 1995 (age 30) | 2022 | 2022 | (England) Manchester United | Free transfer | 0 | 0 | On loan from Manchester United |

== Transfers and loans ==
=== Transfers in ===
| Date | Position | No. | Player | From | Fee | Ref. |
|---|---|---|---|---|---|---|
| 4 July 2021 | GK | 1 | (Serbia) Marko Dmitrović | (Spain) Eibar | Free | |
| 26 July 2021 | RW | 17 | (Argentina) Erik Lamela | (England) Tottenham Hotspur | Free | |
| 13 August 2021 | RB | 2 | (Argentina) Gonzalo Montiel | (Argentina) River Plate | €11,000,000 | |
| 15 August 2021 | LB | 3 | (Sweden) Ludwig Augustinsson | (Germany) Werder Bremen | €5,500,000 | |
| 20 August 2021 | CF | 12 | (Spain) Rafa Mir | (England) Wolverhampton Wanderers | €16,000,000 | |
| 25 August 2021 | DM | 18 | (Denmark) Thomas Delaney | (Germany) Borussia Dortmund | €6,000,000 | |
| 14 January 2022 | RW | 9 | (Mexico) Jesús Corona | (Portugal) Porto | €3,000,000 | |
| Total | | | | | €41,500,000 | |

=== Transfers out ===
| Exit Date | Position | No. | Player | To | Fee | Ref. |
|---|---|---|---|---|---|---|
| 30 June 2021 | GK | 1 | (Czech Republic) Tomáš Vaclík | (Greece) Olympiacos | End of contract | |
| 30 June 2021 | AM | 22 | (Argentina) Franco Vázquez | (Italy) Parma | End of contract | |
| 30 June 2021 | LB | 18 | (Spain) Sergio Escudero | (Spain) Granada | End of contract | |
| 30 June 2021 | GK | — | (Spain) Juan Soriano | (Spain) Tenerife | Released | |
| 30 June 2021 | LB | — | (Brazil) Guilherme Arana | (Brazil) Atlético Mineiro | €2,500,000 (Note: Sevilla will retain 10 percent of Arana's rights.) | |
| 1 July 2021 | RB | 17 | (Spain) Aleix Vidal | (Spain) Espanyol | Released | |
| 26 July 2021 | LW | - | (Spain) Bryan Gil | (England) Tottenham Hotspur | €25,000,000 (Note: Additional incentives of €10,000,000 could raise the fee to €35,000,000 if met.) | |
| 28 July 2021 | CB | 3 | (Spain) Sergi Gómez | (Spain) Espanyol | €1,300,000 | |
| 21 September 2021 | CB | - | (France) Joris Gnagnon | (France) Saint-Étienne | Released | |
| 12 January 2022 | DM | - | (France) Ibrahim Amadou | (France) Metz | Released | |
| Total | | | | | €28,800,000 | |

=== Loans in ===
| Start Date | End Date | Position | No. | Player | From | Fee | Ref. |
|---|---|---|---|---|---|---|---|
| 25 January 2022 | 30 June 2022 | CF | 22 | (France) Anthony Martial | (England) Manchester United | Free | |
| Total | | | | | | €0 | |

=== Loans out ===
| Start Date | End Date | Position | No. | Player | To | Fee | Ref. |
|---|---|---|---|---|---|---|---|
| 22 July 2021 | 30 June 2022 | CB | - | (Spain) Juan Berrocal | (Spain) Sporting Gijón | Undisclosed | |
| 17 August 2021 | 30 June 2022 | RW | - | (Portugal) Rony Lopes | (Greece) Olympiacos | Free (Note: Loan includes purchase option of €12,000,000.) | |
| 31 August 2021 | 30 June 2022 | RB | - | (Spain) Alejandro Pozo | (Spain) Almería | Free (Note: Loan includes purchase option.) | |
| 31 August 2021 | 30 June 2022 | CF | 9 | (Netherlands) Luuk de Jong | (Spain) Barcelona | €1,000,000 (Note: Loan includes purchase option of €3,500,000.) | |
| 17 January 2022 | 30 June 2022 | AM | 14 | (Spain) Óscar Rodríguez | (Spain) Getafe | Free (Note: Loan does not includes purchase option.) | |
| 20 January 2022 | 30 June 2022 | LW | 22 | (Morocco) Oussama Idrissi | (Spain) Cádiz | Free (Note: Loan does not includes purchase option.) | |
| Total | | | | | | €1,000,000 | |

== Pre-season and friendlies ==
Win Draw Loss Fixtures

| 17 July 2021 Friendly | Sevilla | 4–0 | Coventry City | San Pedro del Pinatar, Spain |
| 19:00 CEST (UTC+2) | Pask 5' (o.g.); Idrissi 50'; Romero 67', 75' | Report | | Stadium: Pinatar Arena; Attendance: 0 Referee: José David Martínez Montalbán |

| 22 July 2021 Friendly | Sevilla | 1–0 | Las Palmas | La Línea de la Concepción, Spain |
| 19:00 CEST (UTC+2) | Johansson 58' | Report | | Stadium: Estadio Municipal; Attendance: 0 Referee: Abraham Domínguez Cervantes |

| 27 July 2021 Friendly | Sevilla | 2–2 | Paris Saint-Germain | Algarve, Portugal |
| 20:00 CEST (UTC+2) | Rakitić 40' (pen.); Óscar 62' | Report | Navas (yellow card) 37'; Icardi 48'; Gharbi (yellow card) 43'; Diallo (yellow card) 86'; Nagera 88' | Stadium: Estádio Algarve; Attendance: 0 Referee: João Malheiro Pinto |

| 31 July 2021 Friendly | Sevilla | 0–0 | Roma | Algarve, Portugal |
| 18:30 CEST (UTC+2) | Gudelj (yellow card) 59' (yellow-red card) 66' | Report | Kumbulla (yellow card) 71'; Diawara (yellow card) 82' | Stadium: Estádio Algarve; Referee: Nuno Almeida |

| 7 August 2021 Friendly | Aston Villa | Cancelled | Sevilla | Birmingham, England |
| 15:00 BST (UTC+1) | | | | Stadium: Villa Park |

| 9 September 2021 Friendly | Sevilla | 1–0 | Alavés | Seville, Spain |
| 20:30 CEST (UTC+2) | Óscar 44' | Report | | Stadium: Ramón Sánchez Pizjuán |

== Competitions ==
=== Overall record ===
| Competition | First match | Last match | Starting round | Final position | Record | | | | | | | |
| Competition | First match | Last match | Starting round | Final position | Pld | W | D | L | GF | GA | GD | Win % |
|---|---|---|---|---|---|---|---|---|---|---|---|---|
| La Liga | 15 August 2021 | 22 May 2022 | Matchday 1 | 4th | 38 | 18 | 16 | 4 | 53 | 30 | +23 | 47.37 |
| Copa del Rey | 1 December 2021 | 16 January 2022 | First round | Round of 16 | 4 | 2 | 1 | 1 | 5 | 3 | +2 | 50.00 |
| UEFA Champions League | 14 September 2021 | 8 December 2021 | Group stage | Group stage | 6 | 1 | 3 | 2 | 5 | 5 | +0 | 16.67 |
| UEFA Europa League | 17 February 2022 | 17 March 2022 | Knockout round play-offs | Round of 16 | 4 | 2 | 0 | 2 | 4 | 4 | +0 | 50.00 |
| Total | | | | | 52 | 23 | 20 | 9 | 67 | 42 | +25 | 44.23 |

Source: Soccerway

=== La Liga ===
==== League table ====
| Pos | Team | Pld | W | D | L | GF | GA | GD | Pts | Qualification or relegation |
|---|---|---|---|---|---|---|---|---|---|---|
| 2 | Barcelona | 38 | 21 | 10 | 7 | 68 | 38 | +30 | 73 | Qualification for the Champions League group stage |
| 3 | Atlético Madrid | 38 | 21 | 8 | 9 | 65 | 43 | +22 | 71 | Qualification for the Champions League group stage |
| 4 | Sevilla | 38 | 18 | 16 | 4 | 53 | 30 | +23 | 70 | Qualification for the Champions League group stage |
| 5 | Real Betis | 38 | 19 | 8 | 11 | 62 | 40 | +22 | 65 | Qualification for the Europa League group stage (Note: Since the winners of the 2021–22 Copa del Rey, Real Betis, qualified for European competition based on league position, the Europa League berth awarded to the Copa del Rey winners was passed to the sixth-placed team, and the Europa Conference League berth awarded to the sixth-placed team was passed to the seventh-placed team.) |
| 6 | Real Sociedad | 38 | 17 | 11 | 10 | 40 | 37 | +3 | 62 | Qualification for the Europa League group stage |

Source: LaLiga Santander
Rules for classification: 1) Points; 2) Head-to-head points; 3) Head-to-head goal difference; 4) Goal difference; 5) Goals scored; 6) Fair-play points (Note: Head-to-head record is used only after all the matches between the teams in question have been played)

==== Results summary ====
| Overall | | | | | | | | Home | | | | | | Away | | | | | |
| Pld | W | D | L | GF | GA | GD | Pts | W | D | L | GF | GA | GD | W | D | L | GF | GA | GD |
|---|---|---|---|---|---|---|---|---|---|---|---|---|---|---|---|---|---|---|---|
| 38 | 18 | 16 | 4 | 53 | 30 | +23 | 70 | 12 | 6 | 1 | 36 | 17 | +19 | 6 | 10 | 3 | 17 | 13 | +4 |

Source: La Liga

==== Results by round ====
| Round | 1 | 2 | 3 | 4 | 5 | 6 | 7 | 8 | 9 | 10 | 11 | 12 | 13 | 14 | 15 | 16 | 17 | 18 | 19 | 20 | 21 | 22 | 23 | 24 | 25 | 26 | 27 | 28 | 29 | 30 | 31 | 32 | 33 | 34 | 35 | 36 | 37 | 38 |
|---|---|---|---|---|---|---|---|---|---|---|---|---|---|---|---|---|---|---|---|---|---|---|---|---|---|---|---|---|---|---|---|---|---|---|---|---|---|---|
| Ground | H | A | A | H | A | H | H | A | A | H | A | H | A | H | A | H | A | H | A | H | A | H | A | H | A | H | A | A | H | A | H | H | A | H | A | H | A | H |
| Result | W | W | D | D | D | W | W | L | W | W | D | W | W | D | L | W | W | W | W | W | D | D | D | W | D | W | D | D | D | L | W | L | W | D | D | D | D | W |
| Position | 2 | 1 | 2 | 6 | 6 | 4 | 3 | 4 | 3 | 3 | 3 | 3 | 3 | 3 | 4 | 2 | 2 | 2 | 2 | 2 | 2 | 2 | 2 | 2 | 2 | 2 | 2 | 2 | 2 | 4 | 3 | 3 | 3 | 3 | 3 | 4 | 4 | 4 |

Source: La Liga
A = Away; H = Home; W = Win; D = Draw; L = Loss

==== Matches ====
The league fixtures were announced on 30 June 2021.

| 15 August 2021 1 | Sevilla | 3–0 | Rayo Vallecano | Seville |
| 22:15 CEST (UTC+2) | En-Nesyri 19' (pen.); Idrissi (yellow card) 45+5'; Lamela 55', 79' | Report | Luca (red card) 16' | Stadium: Ramón Sánchez Pizjuán; Attendance: 13,962; Referee: Isidro Díaz de Mera Escuderos |

| 23 August 2021 2 | Getafe | 0–1 | Sevilla | Getafe |
| 20:00 CEST (UTC+2) | Arambarri (yellow card) 16'; Cabaco (yellow card) 44'; Suárez (yellow card) 70' | Report | Gómez (yellow card) 42'; Fernando (yellow card) 86'; Lamela 90+3' | Stadium: Coliseum Alfonso Pérez; Attendance: 4,810; Referee: José María Sánchez Martínez |

| 28 August 2021 3 | Elche | 1–1 | Sevilla | Elche |
| 19:30 CEST (UTC+2) | Roco 11'; Verdú (yellow card) 41'; Fidel (yellow card) 42' | Report | En-Nesyri 40' | Stadium: Estadio Manuel Martínez Valero; Attendance: 10,385; Referee: Valentín Pizarro Gómez |

| 19 September 2021 5 | Real Sociedad | 0–0 | Sevilla | San Sebastián |
| 16:15 CEST (UTC+2) | Oyarzabal (penalty missed) 27'; Muñoz (yellow card) 61'; Januzaj (yellow card) 72' | Report | Rakitić (yellow card) 20'; Lamela (yellow card) 45+2'; Óscar (yellow card) 82' | Stadium: Anoeta; Attendance: 23,757; Referee: Antonio Mateu Lahoz |

| 22 September 2021 6 | Sevilla | 3–1 | Valencia | Seville |
| 19:30 CEST (UTC+2) | Gómez 3'; Montiel 15'; Lamela (yellow card) 17'; Mir 22', (yellow card) 35'; Montiel (yellow card) 30'; Jordán (yellow card) 51'; Gudelj (yellow card) 82' | Report | Lato (yellow card) 17'; Alderete (yellow card) 17'; Duro 31'; Diakhaby (yellow card) 68' | Stadium: Ramón Sánchez Pizjuán; Attendance: 23,654; Referee: José María Sánchez Martínez |

| 25 September 2021 7 | Sevilla | 2–0 | Espanyol | Seville |
| 18:30 CEST (UTC+2) | En-Nesyri 13'; Rakitić (yellow card) 56'; Delaney (yellow card) 65' (yellow-red card) 66'; Lamela (yellow card) 81'; Mir 87' | Report | | Stadium: Ramón Sánchez Pizjuán; Attendance: 23,956; Referee: Pablo González Fuertes |

| 3 October 2021 8 | Granada | 1–0 | Sevilla | Granada |
| 21:00 CEST (UTC+2) | Rochina 25'; Gonalons (yellow card) 28'; Quini (yellow card) 75'; Suárez (yellow card) 90+1' | Report | Diego Carlos (yellow card) 73' (yellow-red card) 90+1'; Acuña (yellow card) 75'; Ocampos (yellow card) 90+2' | Stadium: Nuevo Los Cármenes; Attendance: 12,334; Referee: Javier Alberola Rojas |

| 17 October 2021 9 | Celta Vigo | 0–1 | Sevilla | Vigo |
| 16:15 CEST (UTC+2) | Méndez (yellow card) 2'; Aspas (yellow card) 88' | Report | Rakitić (yellow card) 11'; Navas (yellow card) 38'; Mir 54'; Jordán (yellow card) 62' | Stadium: Balaídos; Attendance: 10,774; Referee: Ricardo de Burgos Bengoetxea |

| 24 October 2021 10 | Sevilla | 5–3 | Levante | Seville |
| 14:00 CEST (UTC+2) | Torres 8'; Mir 24'; Diego Carlos 38'; Munir 50'; Fernando 64', (yellow card) 78' | Report | Morales 33', 55'; Melero 62'; Malsa (yellow card) 66'; Clerc (yellow card) 71' | Stadium: Ramón Sánchez Pizjuán; Attendance: 30,601; Referee: Valentín Pizarro Gómez |

| 27 October 2021 11 | Mallorca | 1–1 | Sevilla | Palma |
| 19:00 CEST (UTC+2) | Sánchez 22', (yellow card) 49'; Oliván (yellow card) 83'; Costa (red card) 90+2'; Reina (yellow card) 90+6'; Russo (yellow card) 90+6' | Report | Acuña (yellow card) 41'; Torres (yellow card) 51'; Lamela 73', (yellow card) 74'; Delaney (yellow card) 90+3' | Stadium: Visit Mallorca Stadium; Attendance: 15,125; Referee: Santiago Jaime Latre |

| 30 October 2021 12 | Sevilla | 2–0 | Osasuna | Seville |
| 16:15 CEST (UTC+2) | Diego Carlos 40'; Ocampos 60'; Jordán (yellow card) 61'; Bounou (yellow card) 89' | Report | Areso (yellow card) 54'; Budimir (yellow card) 70' | Stadium: Ramón Sánchez Pizjuán; Attendance: 20,335; Referee: Carlos del Cerro Grande |

| 7 November 2021 13 | Real Betis | 0–2 | Sevilla | Seville |
| 21:00 CET (UTC+1) | Rodríguez (yellow card) 10' (yellow-red card) 45'; Tello (yellow card) 90+3' | Report | Diego Carlos (yellow card) 31'; Acuña 55'; Bellerín 81' (o.g.) | Stadium: Benito Villamarín; Attendance: 50,534; Referee: Antonio Mateu Lahoz |

| 20 November 2021 14 | Sevilla | 2–2 | Alavés | Seville |
| 16:15 CET (UTC+1) | Ocampos 38', (yellow card) 45+6'; Mir (yellow card) 60'; Rakitić 90+2'; Fernando (yellow card) 90+5'; Acuña (yellow card) 90+5' | Report | Laguardia 5'; Loum (yellow card) 45'; Joselu 45+7' (pen.); Duarte (yellow card) 50'; Méndez (yellow card) 73'; Lejeune (yellow card) 89' | Stadium: Ramón Sánchez Pizjuán; Attendance: 25,208; Referee: Alejandro Muñiz Ruiz |

| 28 November 2021 15 | Real Madrid | 2–1 | Sevilla | Madrid |
| 21:00 CET (UTC+1) | Benzema 32'; Kroos (yellow card) 61'; Carvajal (yellow card) 69'; Vinícius 87'; Casemiro (yellow card) 90+1' | Report | Mir 12'; Acuña (yellow card) 34'; Montiel (yellow card) 55'; Ocampos (yellow card) 84' | Stadium: Santiago Bernabéu; Attendance: 45,281; Referee: José María Sánchez Martínez |

| 4 December 2021 16 | Sevilla | 1–0 | Villarreal | Seville |
| 14:00 CET (UTC+1) | Ocampos 16'; Rakitić (yellow card) 45+3'; Mir (yellow card) 57' | Report | Albiol (yellow card) 61'; Dia (yellow card) 90+2' | Stadium: Ramón Sánchez Pizjuán; Attendance: 30,865; Referee: Carlos del Cerro Grande |

| 11 December 2021 17 | Athletic Bilbao | 0–1 | Sevilla | Bilbao |
| 21:00 CET (UTC+1) | Lekue (yellow card) 52'; D. García (yellow card) 62'; Vencedor (yellow card) 65'; Martínez (yellow card) 90+3' | Report | Delaney 38'; Fernando (yellow card) 73'; Rekik (yellow card) 88'; Koundé (yellow card) 90' | Stadium: San Mamés; Attendance: 36,737; Referee: Alejandro Hernández Hernández |

| 18 December 2021 18 | Sevilla | 2–1 | Atlético Madrid | Seville |
| 21:00 CET (UTC+1) | Rakitić 7'; Rekik (yellow card) 66'; Gómez (yellow card) 68'; Montiel (yellow card) 70'; Ocampos 88' | Report | Felipe 33'; Cunha (yellow card) 90+6' | Stadium: Ramón Sánchez Pizjuán; Attendance: 33,241; Referee: Ricardo de Burgos Bengoetxea |

| 21 December 2021 4 | Sevilla | 1–1 | Barcelona | Seville |
| 21:30 CET (UTC+1) | Gómez 32'; Delaney (yellow card) 35'; Koundé (red card) 64'; Juanlu (yellow card) 88' | Report | Busquets (yellow card) 11'; Araújo 45'; Ezzalzouli (yellow card) 74'; Gavi (yellow card) 77' | Stadium: Ramón Sánchez Pizjuán; Attendance: 31,358; Referee: Carlos del Cerro Grande |
Note: The match was originally scheduled for 11 September 2021, but was postponed due to the late return of several South American players from international duty.

| 3 January 2022 19 | Cádiz | 0–1 | Sevilla | Cádiz |
| 21:15 CET (UTC+1) | | Report | Ocampos 58'; Augustinsson (yellow card) 79' | Stadium: Nuevo Mirandilla; Attendance: 14,342; Referee: Javier Alberola Rojas |

| 9 January 2022 20 | Sevilla | 1–0 | Getafe | Seville |
| 16:15 CET (UTC+1) | Mir 22'; Ocampos (yellow card) 37' | Report | Djené (yellow card) 29'; Silva (yellow card) 65'; Florentino (yellow card) 84' | Stadium: Ramón Sánchez Pizjuán; Attendance: 30,801; Referee: Juan Martínez Munuera |

| 19 January 2022 21 | Valencia | 1–1 | Sevilla | Valencia |
| 21:30 CET (UTC+1) | Guedes 44'; Gayà (yellow card) 45+2' (yellow-red card) 89'; Lato (yellow card) 86' | Report | Diakhaby 7' (o.g.); Acuña (yellow card) 45+2'; Montiel (yellow card) 45+4'; Torres (yellow card) 90+4' | Stadium: Mestalla; Attendance: 26,049; Referee: César Soto Grado |

| 22 January 2022 22 | Sevilla | 2–2 | Celta Vigo | Seville |
| 18:30 CET (UTC+1) | Gómez 71'; Torres 74'; Gudelj (yellow card) 83' | Report | Cervi (yellow card) 23', (goal) 37'; Suárez (yellow card) 31'; Aspas 40'; Tapia (yellow card) 66'; Murillo (yellow card) 76' | Stadium: Ramón Sánchez Pizjuán; Attendance: 30,059; Referee: José María Sánchez Martínez |

| 5 February 2022 23 | Osasuna | 0–0 | Sevilla | Pamplona |
| 16:15 CET (UTC+1) | Sánchez (yellow card) 56' | Report | Gudelj (yellow card) 33'; Rakitić (penalty missed) 90+2' | Stadium: El Sadar; Attendance: 17,635; Referee: Valentín Pizarro Gómez |

| 11 February 2022 24 | Sevilla | 2–0 | Elche | Seville |
| 21:00 CET (UTC+1) | Gómez 70'; Mir 76'; Acuña (yellow card) 90' | Report | Verdú (yellow card) 35'; Gumbau (yellow card) 36'; Badía (yellow card) 70'; Pastore (yellow card) 80'; Roco (yellow card) 90' | Stadium: Ramón Sánchez Pizjuán; Attendance: 33,411; Referee: Miguel Ángel Ortiz Arias |

| 20 February 2022 25 | Espanyol | 1–1 | Sevilla | Cornellà de Llobregat |
| 14:00 CET (UTC+1) | De Tomás (yellow card) 30'; Darder 50'; Puado (yellow card) 76'; Bare (yellow card) 81'; Vidal (yellow card) 90' | Report | Mir 36'; Augustinsson (yellow card) 44'; Corona (yellow card) 47'; Koundé (yellow card) 69' (yellow-red card) 76'; Ocampos (yellow card) 85' | Stadium: RCDE Stadium; Attendance: 24,897; Referee: Pablo González Fuertes |

| 27 February 2022 26 | Sevilla | 2–1 | Real Betis | Seville |
| 16:15 CET (UTC+1) | Jordán (yellow card) 13'; Rakitić 24' (pen.); Acuña (yellow card) 28'; Munir 41', (yellow card) 90+3'; Bono (yellow card) 67'; Augustinsson (yellow card) 87'; Fernando (yellow card) 90+4' | Report | Canales (yellow card) 13', (goal) 90+4'; Rodríguez (yellow card) 75'; Ruibal (yellow card) 77' | Stadium: Ramón Sánchez Pizjuán; Attendance: 37,250; Referee: Carlos del Cerro Grande |

| 4 March 2022 27 | Alavés | 0–0 | Sevilla | Vitoria-Gasteiz |
| 21:00 CET (UTC+1) | Lejeune (yellow card) 34'; Duarte (yellow card) 49'; Pons (yellow card) 62' | Report | Jordán (yellow card) 12' | Stadium: Mendizorrotza; Attendance: 13,121; Referee: Javier Alberola Rojas |

| 13 March 2022 28 | Rayo Vallecano | 1–1 | Sevilla | Madrid |
| 14:00 CET (UTC+1) | Bebé 46' | Report | Ocampos (yellow card) 59'; Delaney 63' | Stadium: Campo de Fútbol de Vallecas; Attendance: 9,073; Referee: Juan Martínez Munuera |

| 20 March 2022 29 | Sevilla | 0–0 | Real Sociedad | Seville |
| 18:30 CET (UTC+1) | | Report | Zaldúa (yellow card) 32'; Januzaj (yellow card) 82'; Gorosabel (yellow card) 89' | Stadium: Ramón Sánchez Pizjuán; Attendance: 24,861; Referee: César Soto Grado |

| 3 April 2022 30 | Barcelona | 1–0 | Sevilla | Barcelona |
| 21:00 CEST (UTC+2) | Busquets (yellow card) 61'; Pedri 72'; Dembélé (yellow card) 82'; Piqué (yellow card) 85' | Report | Montiel (yellow card) 85'; Corona (yellow card) 85'; Ocampos (yellow card) 89' | Stadium: Camp Nou; Attendance: 76,112; Referee: José María Sánchez Martínez |

| 8 April 2022 31 | Sevilla | 4–2 | Granada | Seville |
| 21:00 CEST (UTC+2) | Diego Carlos 32'; Jordán (yellow card) 57'; Ocampos 68'; Mir (yellow card) 78', (goal) 90+3'; Gómez 90+9' | Report | Machís 23'; Eteki (yellow card) 42'; Suárez (yellow card) 76'; Díaz 88' | Stadium: Ramón Sánchez Pizjuán; Attendance: 33,504; Referee: Miguel Ángel Ortiz Arias |

| 17 April 2022 32 | Sevilla | 2–3 | Real Madrid | Seville |
| 21:00 CEST (UTC+2) | Rakitić 21'; Lamela 25'; Martial (yellow card) 39'; Diego Carlos (yellow card) 81'; Torres (yellow card) 84' | Report | Camavinga (yellow card) 31'; Rodrygo 50'; Nacho (yellow card) 78', (goal) 82'; Benzema 90+2'; Kroos (yellow card) 90+6'; Mariano (yellow card) 90+9' | Stadium: Ramón Sánchez Pizjuán; Attendance: 40,629; Referee: Guillermo Cuadra Fernández |

| 21 April 2022 33 | Levante | 2–3 | Sevilla | Valencia |
| 19:00 CEST (UTC+2) | Morales 22' (pen.), (penalty missed) 71'; Pepelu (yellow card) 57'; Soldado 87' | Report | Jordán (yellow card) 4'; Corona 14', 27'; Navas (yellow card) 22'; Montiel (yellow card) 63'; Acuña (yellow card) 69'; Koundé 81'; Mir (yellow card) 90+5' | Stadium: Ciutat de València; Attendance: 18,107; Referee: Isidro Díaz de Mera Escuderos |

| 29 April 2022 34 | Sevilla | 1–1 | Cádiz | Seville |
| 21:00 CEST (UTC+2) | En-Nesyri 7'; Gómez (yellow card) 61'; Navas (yellow card) 78' | Report | Jønsson (yellow card) 17'; Pérez 66'; Espino (yellow card) 90' | Stadium: Ramón Sánchez Pizjuán; Attendance: 27,113; Referee: José María Sánchez Martínez |

| 8 May 2022 35 | Villarreal | 1–1 | Sevilla | Villarreal |
| 16:15 CEST (UTC+2) | Chukwueze (yellow card) 4'; Lo Celso (yellow card) 45', (goal) 86'; Capoue (yellow card) 73' | Report | Koundé 90+5' | Stadium: Estadio de la Cerámica; Attendance: 17,461; Referee: Jesús Gil Manzano |

| 11 May 2022 36 | Sevilla | 0–0 | Mallorca | Seville |
| 20:30 CEST (UTC+2) | Acuña (yellow card) 41'; Jordán (yellow card) 49'; Lamela (yellow card) 60'; Gudelj (yellow card) 75' | Report | Oliván (yellow card) 53'; Raíllo (yellow card) 71'; Sevilla (yellow card) 72'; Sánchez (yellow card) 72'; Kubo (yellow card) 78'; Maffeo (yellow card) 89' | Stadium: Ramón Sánchez Pizjuán; Attendance: 33,242; Referee: Alejandro Hernández Hernández |

| 15 May 2022 37 | Atlético Madrid | 1–1 | Sevilla | Madrid |
| 19:30 CEST (UTC+2) | Giménez 30'; Hermoso (yellow card) 45'; Kondogbia (yellow card) 79'; Koke (yellow card) 89' | Report | Montiel (yellow card) 41'; Gudelj (yellow card) 72'; En-Nesyri 85', (yellow card) 86'; Mir (yellow card) 88'; Acuña (yellow card) 90+5' | Stadium: Wanda Metropolitano; Attendance: 58,138; Referee: José María Sánchez Martínez |

| 22 May 2022 38 | Sevilla | 1–0 | Athletic Bilbao | Seville |
| 22:00 CEST (UTC+2) | Jordán (yellow card) 25'; Mir 68'; Acuña (yellow card) 77'; Gómez (yellow card) 90+5' | Report | R. García (yellow card) 38'; Berchiche (yellow card) 57'; Vivian (yellow card) 65' | Stadium: Ramón Sánchez Pizjuán; Attendance: 31,305; Referee: Carlos del Cerro Grande |

=== Copa del Rey ===
| 1 December 2021 First round | Córdoba | 0–1 (a.e.t.) | Sevilla | Córdoba |
| 19:00 CET (UTC+1) | | Report | Jordán (yellow card) 59'; Diego Carlos (yellow card) 82'; Ocampos 108', (yellow card) 115' | Stadium: Nuevo Arcángel; Referee: Jesús Gil Manzano |

| 15 December 2021 Second round | Andratx | 1–1 (a.e.t.) (5–6 p) | Sevilla | Andratx |
| 19:00 CET (UTC+1) | M. Llabrés 65'; Popar (yellow card) 121' | Report | Mir 57'; Gudelj (yellow card) 116'; Luismi (yellow card) 119' | Stadium: Camp Municipal Sa Plana; Attendance: 2,053; Referee: Juan Martínez Munuera |
| | Penalties |
| | Lorente (penalty missed); Bonet (penalty scored); Pomar (penalty scored); Vidal (penalty scored); Carrasco (penalty scored); Buades (penalty scored); Alorda (penalty missed) | | (penalty scored) Mir; (penalty scored) Gudelj; (penalty missed) Óscar; (penalty scored) Romero; (penalty scored) Luismi; (penalty scored) Gómez; (penalty scored) Delaney |

| 6 January 2022 Round of 32 | Zaragoza | 0–2 | Sevilla | Zaragoza |
| 18:00 CET (UTC+1) | Narváez (yellow card) 54'; Petrović (yellow card) 73' | Report | Koundé 31'; Diego Carlos (yellow card) 52'; Gudelj (yellow card) 60'; Mir 69' | Stadium: La Romareda; Referee: Valentín Pizarro Gómez |

| 16 January 2022 Round of 16 | Real Betis | 2–1 | Sevilla | Seville |
| 16:00 CET (UTC+1) | Fekir (yellow card) 1', (goal) 39'; Carvalho (yellow card) 61'; Canales 73'; Moreno (yellow card) 78' | Report | Ocampos (yellow card) 23'; Gómez 35'; Montiel (yellow card) 64'; Acuña (yellow card) 90+3'; Koundé (yellow card) 90+3' | Stadium: Benito Villamarín; Attendance: 0 Referee: Ricardo de Burgos Bengoetxea |
Note: The match was originally played on 15 January, but was suspended in the 35th minute after Sevilla's Joan Jordán was hit in the head by an object thrown from the crowd. It was resumed the next day at 16:00 behind closed doors.

=== UEFA Champions League ===
==== Group stage ====
The draw for the group stage was held on 26 August 2021.

| Pos | Team | Pld | W | D | L | GF | GA | GD | Pts | Qualification | LIL | SAL | SEV | WOL |
|---|---|---|---|---|---|---|---|---|---|---|---|---|---|---|
| 1 | (France) Lille | 6 | 3 | 2 | 1 | 7 | 4 | +3 | 11 | Advance to knockout phase | — | 1–0 | 0–0 | 0–0 |
| 2 | (Austria) Red Bull Salzburg | 6 | 3 | 1 | 2 | 8 | 6 | +2 | 10 | Advance to knockout phase | 2–1 | — | 1–0 | 3–1 |
| 3 | (Spain) Sevilla | 6 | 1 | 3 | 2 | 5 | 5 | 0 | 6 | Transfer to Europa League | 1–2 | 1–1 | — | 2–0 |
| 4 | (Germany) VfL Wolfsburg | 6 | 1 | 2 | 3 | 5 | 10 | −5 | 5 | | 1–3 | 2–1 | 1–1 | — |

Source: UEFA
Rules for classification: Group stage tiebreakers

| 14 September 2021 1 | Sevilla (Spain) | 1–1 | (Austria) Red Bull Salzburg | Seville, Spain |
| 18:45 CEST (UTC+2) | Diego Carlos (yellow card) 13'; En-Nesyri (yellow card) 26' (yellow-red card) 50'; Rakitić 42' (pen.), (yellow card) 65'; Delaney (yellow card) 82'; Navas (yellow card) 84' | Report | Adeyemi (penalty missed) 13'; Seiwald (yellow card) 15'; Sučić 21' (pen.), (penalty missed) 37'; Capaldo (yellow card) 84'; Camara (yellow card) 90+3'; Okafor (yellow card) 90+4' | Stadium: Ramón Sánchez Pizjuán; Attendance: 18,373; Referee: Aleksei Kulbakov (Belarus) |

| 29 September 2021 2 | VfL Wolfsburg (Germany) | 1–1 | (Spain) Sevilla | Wolfsburg, Germany |
| 21:00 CEST (UTC+2) | Lacroix (yellow card) 1'; Steffen (yellow card) 16', (goal) 49'; Mbabu (yellow card) 50'; Guilavogui (yellow card) 79' (yellow-red card) 85'; Weghorst (yellow card) 86'; Roussillon (yellow card) 90+5' | Report | Suso (yellow card) 24'; Mir (yellow card) 45+3'; Rekik (yellow card) 82'; Rakitić 87' (pen.) | Stadium: Volkswagen Arena; Attendance: 11,733; Referee: Georgi Kabakov (Bulgaria) |

| 20 October 2021 3 | Lille (France) | 0–0 | (Spain) Sevilla | Villeneuve-d'Ascq, France |
| 21:00 CEST (UTC+2) | Çelik (yellow card) 59'; Ikoné (yellow card) 77'; André (yellow card) 88'; Yılmaz (yellow card) 90+2' | Report | Lamela (yellow card) 87' | Stadium: Stade Pierre-Mauroy; Attendance: 34,362; Referee: Michael Oliver (England) |

| 2 November 2021 4 | Sevilla (Spain) | 1–2 | (France) Lille | Seville, Spain |
| 21:00 CET (UTC+1) | Ocampos 15', (yellow card) 90'; Delaney (yellow card) 42'; En-Nesyri (yellow card) 60'; Montiel (yellow card) 90+5'; Diego Carlos (yellow card) 90+6' | Report | David 43' (pen.); Ikoné 51', (yellow card) 79'; Bamba (yellow card) 78'; André (yellow card) 87'; Xeka (yellow card) 90+5'; Grbić (yellow card) 90+6'; Yazıcı (yellow card) 90+7' | Stadium: Ramón Sánchez Pizjuán; Attendance: 29,369; Referee: István Kovács (Romania) |

| 23 November 2021 5 | Sevilla (Spain) | 2–0 | (Germany) VfL Wolfsburg | Seville, Spain |
| 21:00 CEST (UTC+2) | Jordán 13'; Fernando (yellow card) 37'; Mir 90+7' | Report | Guilavogui (yellow card) 52'; Arnold (yellow card) 82'; L. Nmecha (yellow card) 90' | Stadium: Ramón Sánchez Pizjuán; Attendance: 28,663; Referee: Cüneyt Çakır (Turkey) |

| 8 December 2021 6 | Red Bull Salzburg (Austria) | 1–0 | (Spain) Sevilla | Wals-Siezenheim, Austria |
| 21:00 CEST (UTC+2) | Onguéné (yellow card) 37'; Okafor 50'; Ulmer (yellow card) 69' | Report | Augustinsson (yellow card) 18'; Jordán (yellow card) 56' (yellow-red card) 64'; Ocampos (yellow card) 81' | Stadium: Stadion Wals-Siezenheim; Attendance: 0 Referee: Slavko Vinčić (Slovenia) |

=== UEFA Europa League ===
==== Knockout phase ====
===== Knockout round play-offs =====
The knockout round play-offs draw was held on 13 December 2021.

| 17 February 2022 First leg | Sevilla (Spain) | 3–1 | (Croatia) Dinamo Zagreb | Seville, Spain |
| 21:00 CET (UTC+1) | Rakitić 13' (pen.); Ocampos 44'; Martial 45+1'; Acuña (yellow card) 53' | Report | Livaković (yellow card) 12'; Oršić 41'; Petković (yellow card) 53'; Ristovski (yellow card) 76' | Stadium: Ramón Sánchez Pizjuán; Attendance: 28,372; Referee: Marco Guida (Italy) |

| 24 February 2022 Second leg | Dinamo Zagreb (Croatia) | 1–0 (2–3 agg.) | (Spain) Sevilla | Zagreb, Croatia |
| 18:45 CET (UTC+1) | Oršić 65' (pen.) | Report | Acuña (yellow card) 63'; Delaney (yellow card) 66' (yellow-red card) 90+1'; Bounou (yellow card) 88' | Stadium: Stadion Maksimir; Attendance: 9,788; Referee: François Letexier (France) |

===== Round of 16 =====
The draw for the round of 16 was held on 25 February 2022.

| 10 March 2022 First leg | Sevilla (Spain) | 1–0 | (England) West Ham United | Seville, Spain |
| 18:45 CET (UTC+1) | Munir 60'; Ocampos (yellow card) 90' | Report | Zouma (yellow card) 58'; Lanzini (yellow card) 76'; Rice (yellow card) 90' | Stadium: Ramón Sánchez Pizjuán; Attendance: 34,728; Referee: Sandro Schärer (Switzerland) |

| 17 March 2022 Second leg | West Ham United (England) | 2–0 (a.e.t.) (2–1 agg.) | (Spain) Sevilla | London, England |
| 21:00 CET (UTC+1) | Lanzini (yellow card) 34'; Souček 39'; Yarmolenko 112'; Cresswell (yellow card) 117' | Report | Montiel (yellow card) 120+2' | Stadium: London Stadium; Attendance: 59,981; Referee: Clément Turpin (France) |

== Statistics ==
=== Squad appearances and goals ===
As of 22 May 2022

| No. | Pos | Nat | Player | Total | | La Liga | | Copa del Rey | | Champions League | | Europa League | |
| No. | Pos | Nat | Player | Apps | Goals | Apps | Goals | Apps | Goals | Apps | Goals | Apps | Goals |
Goalkeepers
| 1 | GK | (Serbia) SRB | Marko Dmitrović | 9 | 0 | 6 | 0 | 3 | 0 | 0 | 0 | 0 | 0 |
| 13 | GK | (Morocco) MAR | Yassine Bounou | 41 | 0 | 31 | 0 | 0 | 0 | 6 | 0 | 4 | 0 |
| 31 | GK | (Spain) ESP | Javi Díaz | 1 | 0 | 1 | 0 | 0 | 0 | 0 | 0 | 0 | 0 |
| 33 | GK | (Spain) ESP | Alfonso Pastor | 1 | 0 | 0 | 0 | 1 | 0 | 0 | 0 | 0 | 0 |
Defenders
| 2 | DF | (Argentina) ARG | Gonzalo Montiel | 28 | 1 | 15+3 | 1 | 3+1 | 0 | 2+2 | 0 | 1+1 | 0 |
| 3 | DF | (Sweden) SWE | Ludwig Augustinsson | 27 | 0 | 9+10 | 0 | 3 | 0 | 1+2 | 0 | 1+1 | 0 |
| 4 | DF | (Netherlands) NED | Karim Rekik | 26 | 0 | 11+7 | 0 | 3 | 0 | 1+3 | 0 | 1 | 0 |
| 16 | DF | (Spain) ESP | Jesús Navas | 32 | 0 | 19+5 | 0 | 0 | 0 | 4 | 0 | 2+2 | 0 |
| 19 | DF | (Argentina) ARG | Marcos Acuña | 41 | 1 | 26+5 | 1 | 0+2 | 0 | 5 | 0 | 3 | 0 |
| 20 | DF | (Brazil) BRA | Diego Carlos | 45 | 3 | 34 | 3 | 2+1 | 0 | 6 | 0 | 2 | 0 |
| 23 | DF | (France) FRA | Jules Koundé | 44 | 3 | 31+1 | 2 | 1+2 | 1 | 5 | 0 | 4 | 0 |
| 30 | DF | (Spain) ESP | José Ángel Carmona | 2 | 0 | 0+1 | 0 | 0 | 0 | 0 | 0 | 0+1 | 0 |
| 42 | DF | (Argentina) ARG | Valentino Fattore | 1 | 0 | 0+1 | 0 | 0 | 0 | 0 | 0 | 0 | 0 |
Midfielders
| 6 | MF | (Serbia) SRB | Nemanja Gudelj | 28 | 0 | 9+12 | 0 | 4 | 0 | 0 | 0 | 2+1 | 0 |
| 8 | MF | (Spain) ESP | Joan Jordán | 49 | 1 | 31+5 | 0 | 2+2 | 0 | 4+2 | 1 | 2+1 | 0 |
| 10 | MF | (Croatia) CRO | Ivan Rakitić | 46 | 7 | 26+9 | 4 | 3 | 0 | 3+2 | 2 | 3 | 1 |
| 18 | MF | (Denmark) DEN | Thomas Delaney | 35 | 2 | 15+11 | 2 | 1+1 | 0 | 2+2 | 0 | 1+2 | 0 |
| 21 | MF | (Spain) ESP | Óliver Torres | 37 | 2 | 11+15 | 2 | 3+1 | 0 | 2+1 | 0 | 1+3 | 0 |
| 24 | MF | (Argentina) ARG | Alejandro Gómez | 40 | 6 | 19+10 | 5 | 2+2 | 1 | 4+1 | 0 | 2 | 0 |
| 25 | MF | (Brazil) BRA | Fernando | 32 | 1 | 21+3 | 1 | 0 | 0 | 6 | 0 | 2 | 0 |
| 27 | MF | (Spain) ESP | Luismi Cruz | 4 | 0 | 0+2 | 0 | 0+1 | 0 | 0 | 0 | 0+1 | 0 |
| 34 | MF | (Spain) ESP | Pedro Ortiz | 1 | 0 | 0+1 | 0 | 0 | 0 | 0 | 0 | 0 | 0 |
| 43 | MF | (Spain) ESP | Nacho Quintana | 1 | 0 | 0 | 0 | 0+1 | 0 | 0 | 0 | 0 | 0 |
Forwards
| 5 | FW | (Argentina) ARG | Lucas Ocampos | 42 | 9 | 23+7 | 6 | 2+1 | 1 | 5+1 | 1 | 3 | 1 |
| 7 | FW | (Spain) ESP | Suso | 12 | 0 | 6+2 | 0 | 0 | 0 | 4 | 0 | 0 | 0 |
| 9 | FW | (Mexico) MEX | Tecatito Corona | 22 | 2 | 12+6 | 2 | 0+1 | 0 | 0 | 0 | 3 | 0 |
| 11 | FW | (Morocco) MAR | Munir | 25 | 3 | 4+12 | 2 | 2 | 0 | 2+2 | 0 | 2+1 | 1 |
| 12 | FW | (Spain) ESP | Rafa Mir | 47 | 13 | 18+16 | 10 | 2+2 | 2 | 3+3 | 1 | 1+2 | 0 |
| 15 | FW | (Morocco) MAR | Youssef En-Nesyri | 29 | 5 | 15+8 | 5 | 0 | 0 | 1+1 | 0 | 2+2 | 0 |
| 17 | FW | (Argentina) ARG | Erik Lamela | 24 | 5 | 10+10 | 5 | 0 | 0 | 0+4 | 0 | 0 | 0 |
| 22 | FW | (France) FRA | Anthony Martial | 12 | 1 | 7+2 | 0 | 0 | 0 | 0 | 0 | 2+1 | 1 |
| 32 | FW | (Spain) ESP | Juanlu | 2 | 0 | 0+1 | 0 | 1 | 0 | 0 | 0 | 0 | 0 |
| 36 | FW | (Spain) ESP | Iván Romero | 10 | 0 | 2+3 | 0 | 2+2 | 0 | 0+1 | 0 | 0 | 0 |
| 38 | FW | (Spain) ESP | Antonio Zarzana | 1 | 0 | 0 | 0 | 0+1 | 0 | 0 | 0 | 0 | 0 |
Players who have made an appearance this season but have left the club
| 14 | MF | (Spain) ESP | Óscar Rodríguez | 15 | 0 | 4+7 | 0 | 2+1 | 0 | 0+1 | 0 | 0 | 0 |
| 22 | FW | (Morocco) MAR | Oussama Idrissi | 7 | 0 | 2+3 | 0 | 2 | 0 | 0 | 0 | 0 | 0 |

=== Goalscorers ===
As of 27 February 2022

| Rank | No. | Pos. | Nat. | Player | La Liga | Copa del Rey | Champions League | Europa League | Total |
|---|---|---|---|---|---|---|---|---|---|
| 1 | 12 | FW | (Spain) | Rafa Mir | 8 | 2 | 1 | 0 | 11 |
| 2 | 5 | FW | (Argentina) | Lucas Ocampos | 5 | 2 | 1 | 1 | 9 |
| 3 | 10 | MF | (Croatia) | Ivan Rakitić | 3 | 0 | 2 | 1 | 6 |
| 4 | 24 | MF | (Argentina) | Alejandro Gómez | 4 | 1 | 0 | 0 | 5 |
| 5 | 17 | FW | (Argentina) | Erik Lamela | 4 | 0 | 0 | 0 | 4 |
| 6 | 15 | FW | (Morocco) | Youssef En-Nesyri | 3 | 0 | 0 | 0 | 3 |
| 7 | 20 | DF | (Brazil) | Diego Carlos | 2 | 0 | 0 | 0 | 2 |
| 7 | 21 | MF | (Spain) | Óliver Torres | 2 | 0 | 0 | 0 | 2 |
| 7 | 11 | FW | (Morocco) | Munir | 2 | 0 | 0 | 0 | 2 |
| 10 | 2 | DF | (Argentina) | Gonzalo Montiel | 1 | 0 | 0 | 0 | 1 |
| 10 | 19 | DF | (Argentina) | Marcos Acuña | 1 | 0 | 0 | 0 | 1 |
| 10 | 25 | MF | (Brazil) | Fernando | 1 | 0 | 0 | 0 | 1 |
| 10 | 8 | MF | (Spain) | Joan Jordán | 0 | 0 | 1 | 0 | 1 |
| 10 | 18 | MF | (Denmark) | Thomas Delaney | 1 | 0 | 0 | 0 | 1 |
| 10 | 22 | FW | (France) | Anthony Martial | 0 | 0 | 0 | 1 | 1 |
| Own goals | | | | | 2 | 0 | 0 | 0 | 0 |
| Totals | | | | | 39 | 5 | 5 | 3 | 52 |

=== Clean sheets ===
As of 27 February 2022

| Rank | No. | Player | La Liga | Copa del Rey | Champions League | Europa League | Total | Starts |
|---|---|---|---|---|---|---|---|---|
| 1 | 13 | (Morocco) Yassine Bounou | 11 | 0 | 2 | 0 | 13 | 29 |
| 2 | 1 | (Serbia) Marko Dmitrović | 2 | 2 | 0 | 0 | 4 | 7 |
| 3 | 31 | (Spain) Javi Díaz | 0 | 0 | 0 | 0 | 0 | 1 |
| 3 | 33 | (Spain) Alfonso Pastor | 0 | 0 | 0 | 0 | 0 | 1 |
| Totals | | | 13 | 2 | 2 | 0 | 17 | 38 |

=== Disciplinary record ===
Includes all competitive matches.

| N | P | Nat. | Name | La Liga | | | Champions League | | | Copa del Rey | | | Europa League | | | Total | | | Notes |
| N | P | Nat. | Name | Yellow card | Second yellow card | Red card | Yellow card | Second yellow card | Red card | Yellow card | Second yellow card | Red card | Yellow card | Second yellow card | Red card | Yellow card | Second yellow card | Red card | Notes |
| 2 | DF | (Argentina) | Gonzalo Montiel | 4 | | | 1 | | | 1 | | | | | | 6 | | | |
| 3 | DF | (Sweden) | Ludwig Augustinsson | 3 | | | 1 | | | | | | | | | 4 | | | |
| 4 | DF | (Netherlands) | Karim Rekik | 2 | | | 1 | | | | | | | | | 3 | | | |
| 5 | FW | (Argentina) | Lucas Ocampos | 5 | | | 1 | | | 2 | | | | | | 8 | | | |
| 6 | MF | (Serbia) | Nemanja Gudelj | 3 | | | | | | 2 | | | | | | 5 | | | |
| 7 | FW | (Spain) | Suso | | | | 1 | | | | | | | | | 1 | | | |
| 8 | FW | (Spain) | Joan Jordán | 4 | | | | 1 | | 1 | | | | | | 5 | 1 | | |
| 9 | MF | (Mexico) | Tecatito Corona | 1 | | | | | | | | | | | | 1 | | | |
| 10 | MF | (Croatia) | Ivan Rakitić | 4 | | | 1 | | | | | | | | | 5 | | | |
| 11 | FW | (Morocco) | Munir | 2 | | | | | | | | | | | | 2 | | | |
| 12 | FW | (Spain) | Rafa Mir | 3 | | | 1 | | | | | | | | | 4 | | | |
| 13 | GK | (Morocco) | Bono | 2 | | | | | | | | | 1 | | | 3 | | | |
| ~~14~~ | MF | (Spain) | Óscar Rodríguez | 1 | | | | | | | | | | | | 1 | | | |
| 15 | FW | (Morocco) | Youssef En-Nesyri | | | | 1 | 1 | | | | | | | | 1 | 1 | | |
| 16 | DF | (Spain) | Jesús Navas | 2 | | | 1 | | | | | | | | | 3 | | | |
| 17 | FW | (Argentina) | Erik Lamela | 4 | | | 2 | | | | | | | | | 6 | | | |
| 18 | MF | (Denmark) | Thomas Delaney | 2 | 1 | | 2 | | | | | | | 1 | | 4 | 2 | | |
| 19 | DF | (Argentina) | Marcos Acuña | 6 | | | | | | 1 | | | 2 | | | 9 | | | |
| 20 | DF | (Brazil) | Diego Carlos | 1 | | | 2 | 1 | | 2 | | | | | | 5 | 1 | | |
| 21 | MF | (Spain) | Óliver Torres | 1 | | | | | | | | | | | | 1 | | | |
| ~~22~~ | FW | (Morocco) | Oussama Idrissi | 1 | | | | | | | | | | | | 1 | | | |
| 23 | DF | (France) | Jules Koundé | 1 | 1 | 1 | | | | 1 | | | | | | 2 | 1 | 1 | |
| 24 | FW | (Argentina) | Alejandro Gómez | 2 | | | | | | | | | | | | 2 | | | |
| 25 | MF | (Brazil) | Fernando | 6 | | | 1 | | | | | | | | | 7 | | | |
| 27 | MF | (Spain) | Luismi Cruz | | | | | | | 1 | | | | | | 1 | | | |
| 32 | FW | (Spain) | Juanlu | 1 | | | | | | | | | | | | 1 | | | |

Last updated: 27 February 2022
Source: ESPNFC.com
Ordered by (red card) , (second yellow card) and (yellow card)
(yellow card) = Number of bookings; (second yellow card) = Number of sending offs after a second yellow card; (red card) = Number of sending offs by a direct red card.
