= 2020–21 Sevilla FC season =

114th season in existence of Sevilla FC

Sevilla FC
2020–21 season
- President: José Castro Carmona
- Head coach: Julen Lopetegui
- Stadium: Ramón Sánchez Pizjuán
- La Liga: 4th
- Copa del Rey: Semi-finals
- UEFA Champions League: Round of 16
- UEFA Super Cup: Runners-up
- Top goalscorer: League: Youssef En-Nesyri (18); All: Youssef En-Nesyri (24)
- Biggest win: 3–0 vs Ciudad de Lucena; 3–0 vs Cádiz; 3–0 vs Valencia; 3–0 vs Getafe
- Biggest defeat: 0–4 vs Chelsea; 0–4 vs Villarreal
Home colours	Away colours	Third colours

The 2020–21 season was the 114th season in the existence of Sevilla FC and the club's 20th consecutive season in the top flight of Spanish football. In addition to the domestic league, Sevilla participated in this season's editions of the Copa del Rey, the UEFA Champions League and the UEFA Super Cup. The season covered the period from 22 August 2020 to 30 June 2021, with the late start to the season due to the COVID-19 pandemic in Spain.

== Kits ==
On 21 May 2018, Sevilla announced a new three-year kit supply contract with American sportswear giant Nike from 2018 to 2021. On 4 August 2020, Sevilla FC extended its relationship with kit supplier Nike. The current contract, which ends in 2021, will now extend for the 2021–22 season.

Home	Home alt.	Away	Third

== Players ==
As of 23 May 2021.

No.	Name	Nat	Position(s)	Date of birth (age)	Signed in	Contract ends	Signed from	Transfer fees	Apps.	Goals	Notes
Goalkeepers
1	Tomas Vaclik	(Czech Republic)	GK	29 March 1989 (age 37)	2018	2021	(Switzerland) Basel	€6m	94	0	
13	Yassine Bounou	(Morocco)	GK	5 April 1991 (age 35)	2020	2024	(Spain) Girona	€4m	63	1	
31	Javi Díaz	(Spain)	GK	15 May 1997 (age 29)	2019	2022	(Spain) Sevilla Atlético	Youth system	1	0	
Defenders
2	Joris Gnagnon	(France)	CB	13 January 1997 (age 29)	2018	2023	(France) Rennes	€13.5m	17	0	
3	Sergi Gómez	(Spain)	CB	28 March 1992 (age 34)	2018	2022	(Spain) Celta Vigo	€4.5m	85	0	
4	Karim Rekik	(Netherlands)	CB	2 December 1994 (age 31)	2020	2025	(Germany) Hertha BSC	€2m	22	0	
12	Jules Koundé	(France)	CB	12 November 1998 (age 28)	2019	2024	(France) Bordeaux	€25m	89	6	
16	Jesús Navas	(Spain)	RB	21 November 1985 (age 40)	2017	2021	(England) Manchester City	Free transfer	563	36	Captain
17	Aleix Vidal	(Spain)	RB	21 August 1989 (age 37)	2018	2022	(Spain) Barcelona	€9.3m	87	6	
18	Sergio Escudero	(Spain)	LB	29 March 1989 (age 37)	2015	2021	(Spain) Getafe	€3m	176	7	Vice-captain
19	Marcos Acuña	(Argentina)	LB	28 October 1991 (age 35)	2020	2024	(Portugal) Sporting CP	€10.5m	37	1	
20	Diego Carlos	(Brazil)	CB	15 March 1993 (age 33)	2019	2024	(France) Nantes	€15m	91	3	
Midfielders
6	Nemanja Gudelj	(Serbia)	DM	16 November 1991 (age 34)	2019	2023	(China) Guangzhou Evergrande	Free transfer	82	0	
8	Joan Jordán	(Spain)	CM	6 July 1994 (age 32)	2019	2023	(Spain) Eibar	€14m	97	4	
10	Ivan Rakitić	(Croatia)	CM	10 March 1988 (age 38)	2020	2024	(Spain) Barcelona	€1.5m	199	40	Second nationality: Switzerland
14	Óscar Rodríguez	(Spain)	AM	28 June 1998 (age 28)	2020	2025	(Spain) Real Madrid	€13.5m	29	2	-
21	Óliver Torres	(Spain)	CM	10 November 1994 (age 32)	2019	2024	(Portugal) Porto	€11m	84	6	
22	Franco Vázquez	(Argentina)	AM	22 February 1989 (age 37)	2016	2021	(Italy) Palermo	€16.8m	198	26	Second nationality: Italy
25	Fernando Reges	(Brazil)	DM	25 July 1987 (age 39)	2019	2022	(Turkey) Galatasaray	€4.5m	86	6	Second nationality: Portugal
Forwards
5	Lucas Ocampos	(Argentina)	RW	11 July 1994 (age 32)	2019	2024	(France) Marseille	€15m	90	25	
7	Suso	(Spain)	RW	19 November 1993 (age 32)	2020	2024	(Italy) Milan	€21m	67	6	
9	Luuk de Jong	(Netherlands)	CF	27 August 1990 (age 36)	2019	2023	(Netherlands) PSV Eindhoven	€12.5m	94	19	
11	Munir	(Morocco)	RW	1 September 1995 (age 31)	2019	2023	(Spain) Barcelona	€1.05m	88	22	Second nationality: Spain
15	Youssef En-Nesyri	(Morocco)	CF	1 June 1997 (age 29)	2020	2025	(Spain) Leganés	€20m	78	30	
24	Alejandro Gómez	(Argentina)	LW	15 February 1988 (age 38)	2021	2024	(Italy) Atalanta	€5.5m	23	3	Second nationality: Italy

== Transfers and loans ==
=== Transfers in ===
Entry date	Position	No.	Player	From club	Fee	Ref.
21 July 2020	RW	7	(Spain) Suso	(Italy) Milan	€21,000,000 (Note: Purchase option became mandatory based on 2020–21 Champions League qualification.)	
29 August 2020	AM	14	(Spain) Óscar Rodríguez	(Spain) Real Madrid (Note: Real Madrid will retain 25 percent of Óscar's rights.)	€13,500,000 (Note: Performance incentives could raise the fee to €15,000,000.)	
1 September 2020	CM	10	(Croatia) Ivan Rakitić	(Spain) Barcelona	€1,500,000 (Note: Additional incentives of €9,000,000 could raise the fee to €10,500,000 if met.)	
4 September 2020	GK	13	(Morocco) Yassine Bounou	(Spain) Girona	€4,000,000 (Note: Additional incentives could raise the fee to €4,500,000.)	
14 September 2020	LB	19	(Argentina) Marcos Acuña	(Portugal) Sporting CP	€10,500,000 (Note: Additional incentives could raise the fee to €12,500,000.)	
5 October 2020	LW	23	(Morocco) Oussama Idrissi	(Netherlands) AZ	€12,000,000 (Note: Additional incentives could raise the fee to €13,000,000.)	
5 October 2020	CB	4	(Netherlands) Karim Rekik	(Germany) Hertha BSC	€2,000,000 (Note: Additional incentives could raise the fee to €3,000,000.)	
26 January 2021	FW	24	(Argentina) Alejandro Gómez	(Italy) Atalanta	€5,500,000 (Note: Additional incentives could raise the fee to €8,500,000.)	
Total					€70,000,000	

=== Transfers out ===
Exit date	Position	No.	Player	To club	Fee	Ref.
22 August 2020 (Note: Announced agreement with Al-Shabab on January 25, 2020. Received an agreement to extend expiring contract in order finish the 2019-20 regular season with Sevilla FC.)	CM	10	(Argentina) Éver Banega	(Saudi Arabia) Al-Shabab	Free	
1 September 2020 (Note: AC Milan executed the purchase option included in the loan agreement on July 15, 2020.)	CB	24	(Denmark) Simon Kjær	(Italy) Milan	€3,500,000	
1 September 2020	CF	—	(Spain) Marc Gual	(Spain) Alcorcón	Unknown	
5 September 2020	GK	16	(Spain) Sergio Rico	(France) Paris Saint-Germain	€6,000,000	
20 September 2020	MF	—	(Georgia (country)) Giorgi Aburjania	(Spain) Real Oviedo	Free	
3 October 2020	RB	—	(France) Sébastien Corchia	(France) Nantes	Released	
5 October 2020	MF	—	(Spain) Roque Mesa	(Spain) Valladolid	Released	
24 January 2021	FW	24	(Spain) Carlos Fernández	(Spain) Real Sociedad	€10,000,000 (Note: Performance incentives could raise the fee to €12,000,000. Sevilla will receive 20 percent of the capital gain from a future sale.)	
Total					€19,500,000	

=== Loans out ===
Start date	End date	Position	No.	Player	To club	Fee	Ref.
29 January 2020	30 June 2021	LB	—	(Brazil) Guilherme Arana	(Brazil) Atlético Mineiro	€2,500,000 (Note: Purchase option of €2,500,000 due upon loan expiration if playtime conditions met.)	
29 July 2020	30 June 2021	RW	7	(Portugal) Rony Lopes	(France) Nice	€1,000,000	
25 August 2020	30 June 2021	CB	—	(Spain) Juan Berrocal	(Spain) Mirandés	None	
28 September 2020	30 June 2021	GK	28	(Spain) Juan Soriano	(Spain) Málaga	None	
5 October 2020	30 June 2021	RB	17	(Spain) Alejandro Pozo	(Spain) Eibar	Unknown	
5 October 2020	30 June 2021	LW	29	(Spain) Bryan Gil	(Spain) Eibar	Unknown	
5 October 2020	30 June 2021	DM	—	(France) Ibrahim Amadou	(France) Angers	TBD (Note: Loan includes option to buy.)	
1 February 2021	30 June 2021	LW	23	(Morocco) Oussama Idrissi	(Netherlands) Ajax	Free	
Total						€3,500,000	

== Pre-season and friendlies ==
Win Draw Loss Fixtures

15 September 2020 Friendly	Sevilla	3–2	Levante	San Pedro del Pinatar, Spain
18:00 CEST (UTC+2)	Ocampos 59'; En-Nesyri 71'; Rakitić 90+5'	Report	Postigo 14'; Gómez 23'	Stadium: Pinatar Arena; Attendance: 0 Referee: José David Martínez Montalbán

18 September 2020 Friendly	Sevilla	2–1	Athletic Bilbao	San Pedro del Pinatar, Spain
17:30 CEST (UTC+2)	Escudero 28'; En-Nesyri 51'	Report	Muniain 35' (pen.)	Stadium: Pinatar Arena; Attendance: 0 Referee: Juan Francisco Roca Robles

18 September 2020 Friendly	Sevilla	0–1	Athletic Bilbao	San Pedro del Pinatar, Spain
19:30 CEST (UTC+2)		Report	Villalibre 61'	Stadium: Pinatar Arena; Attendance: 0 Referee: Fulgencio Madrid Martínez

== Competitions ==
=== Overview ===
Competition	First match	Last match	Starting round	Final position	Record							
Competition	First match	Last match	Starting round	Final position	Pld	W	D	L	GF	GA	GD	Win %
La Liga	27 September 2020	23 May 2021	Matchday 1	4th	38	24	5	9	53	33	+20	63.16
Copa del Rey	15 December 2020	3 March 2021	First round	Semi-finals	7	6	0	1	12	3	+9	85.71
UEFA Champions League	20 October 2020	9 March 2021	Group stage	Round of 16	8	4	2	2	13	13	+0	50.00
UEFA Super Cup	24 September 2020		Final	Runners-up	1	0	0	1	1	2	−1	0.00
Total					54	34	7	13	79	51	+28	62.96

Source: Soccerway

=== La Liga ===
==== League table ====
Pos	Team	Pld	W	D	L	GF	GA	GD	Pts	Qualification or relegation
2	Real Madrid	38	25	9	4	67	28	+39	84	Qualification for the Champions League group stage
3	Barcelona	38	24	7	7	85	38	+47	79	Qualification for the Champions League group stage
4	Sevilla	38	24	5	9	53	33	+20	77	Qualification for the Champions League group stage
5	Real Sociedad	38	17	11	10	59	38	+21	62	Qualification for the Europa League group stage (Note: Since the winners of the 2020–21 Copa del Rey, Barcelona, qualified for the 2021–22 UEFA Champions League based on league position, the spot awarded to the cup winners (Europa League group stage) was passed to the sixth-placed team, and the spot awarded to the sixth-placed team (2021–22 UEFA Europa Conference League play-off round) was passed to the seventh-placed team, Villarreal.)
6	Real Betis	38	17	10	11	50	50	0	61	Qualification for the Europa League group stage

Source: La Liga
Rules for classification: 1) Points; 2) Head-to-head points; 3) Head-to-head goal difference; 4) Goal difference; 5) Goals scored; 6) Fair-play points (Note: Head-to-head record is used only after all the matches between the teams in question have been played)

==== Results summary ====
Overall								Home						Away					
Pld	W	D	L	GF	GA	GD	Pts	W	D	L	GF	GA	GD	W	D	L	GF	GA	GD
38	24	5	9	53	33	+20	77	14	1	4	27	11	+16	10	4	5	26	22	+4

Source: La Liga

==== Results by round ====
Round	1	2	3	4	5	6	7	8	9	10	11	12	13	14	15	16	17	18	19	20	21	22	23	24	25	26	27	28	29	30	31	32	33	34	35	36	37	38
Ground	A	H	A	H	A	A	H	A	H	H	A	H	A	H	A	H	A	H	A	H	A	H	H	A	H	A	H	A	H	A	A	A	H	H	A	H	A	H
Result	L	W	W	W	D	L	L	L	W	W	W	L	W	D	W	W	D	W	W	W	W	W	W	W	L	L	W	D	W	W	W	W	W	L	D	W	L	W
Position	16	17	11	6	6	10	13	16	12	7	5	6	5	7	6	4	6	6	5	4	4	4	4	3	4	4	4	4	4	4	4	4	4	4	4	4	4	4

Source: La Liga
A = Away; H = Home; W = Win; D = Draw; L = Loss

==== Matches ====
The league fixtures were announced on 31 August 2020.

27 September 2020 3	Cádiz	1–3	Sevilla	Cádiz
18:30 CEST (UTC+2)	Salvi 48'; Cala (yellow card) 78'; Fernández (yellow card) 90+1'; Marcos Mauro (yellow card) 90+2'; Fali (yellow card) 90+6'	Report	Gudelj (yellow card) 58'; De Jong 65'; Suso (yellow card) 67'; Munir 90'; Rakitić 90+4'	Stadium: Estadio Ramón de Carranza; Attendance: 0 (Note: The match was played behind closed doors due to the COVID-19 pandemic in Spain.); Referee: David Medié Jiménez

1 October 2020 4	Sevilla	1–0	Levante	Seville
19:00 CEST (UTC+2)	Navas (yellow card) 51'; Ocampos (yellow card) 78'; Koundé (yellow card) 82'; Fernando (yellow card) 83'; Diego Carlos (yellow card) 90'; En-Nesyri 90+2'	Report	Vezo (yellow card) 38'; Son (yellow card) 76'	Stadium: Ramón Sánchez Pizjuán; Attendance: 0 Referee: Xavier Estrada Fernández

4 October 2020 5	Barcelona	1–1	Sevilla	Barcelona
21:00 CEST (UTC+2)	Coutinho 10'; Pjanić (yellow card) 77'	Report	De Jong 8'; Gudelj (yellow card) 87'	Stadium: Camp Nou; Attendance: 0 Referee: Jesús Gil Manzano

17 October 2020 6	Granada	1–0	Sevilla	Granada
13:00 CEST (UTC+2)	Gonalons (yellow card) 30'; Foulquier (yellow card) 40'; Puertas (yellow card) 71'; Herrera 82'; Vico (yellow card) 85'	Report	Fernando (yellow card) 10'; Jordán (yellow card) 45+3' (yellow-red card) 45+4'; Vázquez (yellow card) 90+1'	Stadium: Nuevo Los Cármenes; Attendance: 0 Referee: Pablo González Fuertes

24 October 2020 7	Sevilla	0–1	Eibar	Seville
18:30 CEST (UTC+2)		Report	Kike 41'; Rodrigues (yellow card) 44'; Expósito (yellow card) 74'; León (yellow card) 87'	Stadium: Ramón Sánchez Pizjuán; Attendance: 0 Referee: Alejandro Hernández Hernández

31 October 2020 8	Athletic Bilbao	2–1	Sevilla	Bilbao
16:15 CET (UTC+1)	R. García (yellow card) 30'; Martínez (yellow card) 54'; I. Williams (yellow card) 62'; Muniain 76'; Sancet 86'; López (yellow card) 90'; Berchiche (yellow card) 90+3'	Report	En-Nesyri 9'; Fernando (yellow card) 26'; Koundé (yellow card) 63'; Acuña (yellow card) 69'; Navas (yellow card) 88'; Diego Carlos (yellow card) 90+1'	Stadium: San Mamés; Attendance: 0 Referee: Carlos del Cerro Grande

7 November 2020 9	Sevilla	1–0	Osasuna	Seville
18:30 CET (UTC+1)	Ocampos 59' (pen.); Rakitić (yellow card) 77'; Fernando (yellow card) 87'	Report	U. García (yellow card) 38'; Oier (yellow card) 80'; D. García (yellow card) 90+1'	Stadium: Ramón Sánchez Pizjuán; Attendance: 0 Referee: Juan Martínez Munuera

21 November 2020 10	Sevilla	4–2	Celta Vigo	Seville
18:30 CET (UTC+1)	Navas (yellow card) 2'; Koundé 5'; En-Nesyri 45+3'; Escudero (yellow card) 73', (goal) 85'; Munir 87'	Report	Aspas 10'; Nolito 36'; Suárez (yellow card) 54'; Mallo (yellow card) 72'	Stadium: Ramón Sánchez Pizjuán; Attendance: 0 Referee: César Soto Grado

28 November 2020 11	Huesca	0–1	Sevilla	Huesca
18:30 CET (UTC+1)	Seoane (yellow card) 53'; Maffeo (yellow card) 60'; Okazaki (yellow card) 85'; Insua (yellow card) 88'	Report	Rekik (yellow card) 23'; Jordán (yellow card) 58'; Torres (yellow card) 70'; En-Nesyri 83'	Stadium: Estadio El Alcoraz; Attendance: 0 Referee: Guillermo Cuadra Fernández

5 December 2020 12	Sevilla	0–1	Real Madrid	Seville
16:15 CET (UTC+1)	Gudelj (yellow card) 76'	Report	Kroos (yellow card) 44'; Bounou 55' (o.g.); Modrić (yellow card) 60'; Vinícius (yellow card) 89'	Stadium: Ramón Sánchez Pizjuán; Attendance: 0 Referee: José María Sánchez Martínez

12 December 2020 13	Getafe	0–1	Sevilla	Getafe
16:15 CET (UTC+1)	Arambarri (yellow card) 36'; Ünal (yellow card) 83'	Report	Rakitić (yellow card) 40'; Diego Carlos (yellow card) 45+1'; Vidal (yellow card) 51'; Etxeita 81' (o.g.)	Stadium: Coliseum Alfonso Pérez; Attendance: 0 Referee: Juan Martínez Munuera

19 December 2020 14	Sevilla	1–1	Valladolid	Seville
21:00 CET (UTC+1)	Ocampos 31' (pen.), (yellow card) 59'; Gudelj (yellow card) 85'; De Jong (yellow card) 88'	Report	Bruno (yellow card) 8'; Fede (yellow card) 30'; Orellana (yellow card) 43'; Marcos André (yellow card) 73'; García 87'	Stadium: Ramón Sánchez Pizjuán; Attendance: 0 Referee: Jesús Gil Manzano

22 December 2020 15	Valencia	0–1	Sevilla	Valencia
17:30 CET (UTC+1)	Wass (yellow card) 45+2'; Soler (yellow card) 71'; Molina (yellow card) 78'	Report	De Jong (yellow card) 55'; Suso 81'; Jordán (yellow card) 83'	Stadium: Mestalla; Attendance: 0 Referee: Valentín Pizarro Gómez

29 December 2020 16	Sevilla	2–0	Villarreal	Seville
17:00 CET (UTC+1)	Ocampos 8' (pen.); Fernando (yellow card) 39'; En-Nesyri 53'	Report	Foyth (yellow card) 7'; Trigueros (yellow card) 76'; Parejo (yellow card) 88'; Bacca (yellow card) 90+1'	Stadium: Ramón Sánchez Pizjuán; Attendance: 0 Referee: César Soto Grado

2 January 2021 17	Real Betis	1–1	Sevilla	Seville
16:15 CET (UTC+1)	Miranda (yellow card) 20'; Ruiz (yellow card) 28'; Rodríguez (yellow card) 45+1'; Canales 51' (pen.); Lainez (yellow card) 58'; Fekir (penalty missed) 75'; Emerson (yellow card) 85'	Report	Torres (yellow card) 42'; Suso 48'; Rakitić (yellow card) 89'	Stadium: Benito Villamarín; Attendance: 0 Referee: Carlos del Cerro Grande

9 January 2021 18	Sevilla	3–2	Real Sociedad	Seville
14:00 CET (UTC+1)	En-Nesyri 4', 7', 46'	Report	Diego Carlos 5' (o.g.); Isak 14'; Muñoz (yellow card) 34'; Sagnan (yellow card) 39'; Guridi (yellow card) 43'	Stadium: Ramón Sánchez Pizjuán; Attendance: 0 Referee: Javier Alberola Rojas

12 January 2021 1	Atlético Madrid	2–0	Sevilla	Madrid
21:30 CET (UTC+1)	Correa 17'; Koke (yellow card) 48'; Savić (yellow card) 57'; Saúl 76'	Report		Stadium: Wanda Metropolitano; Attendance: 0 Referee: Xavier Estrada Fernández
Note: Match originally scheduled for 12 September 2020, but postponed due to the delayed conclusion of last season's UEFA club competitions.

19 January 2021 19	Alavés	1–2	Sevilla	Vitoria-Gasteiz
21:30 CET (UTC+1)	Méndez 12', (yellow card) 56'; Lejeune (yellow card) 48'; Pons (yellow card) 72'; Joselu (penalty missed) 90+1'	Report	En-Nesyri 3', (yellow card) 81'; Suso 30'; Bounou (yellow card) 89'; Navas (yellow card) 90'	Stadium: Mendizorrotza; Attendance: 0 Referee: Isidro Díaz de Mera Escuderos

23 January 2021 20	Sevilla	3–0	Cádiz	Seville
16:15 CET (UTC+1)	En-Nesyri 35', 39', 62'; Gudelj (yellow card) 90+4'	Report	Alcalá (yellow card) 37'; Salvi (yellow card) 45+1'; Cala (yellow card) 81'	Stadium: Ramón Sánchez Pizjuán; Attendance: 0 Referee: Guillermo Cuadra Fernández

30 January 2021 21	Eibar	0–2	Sevilla	Eibar
14:00 CET (UTC+1)	Oliveira (yellow card) 9'; Diop (yellow card) 17'; Arbilla (yellow card) 62'; Correa (yellow card) 78'	Report	S. Gómez (yellow card) 20'; Ocampos 28' (pen.); Jordán 55'; Munir (yellow card) 90+4'; Rakitić (yellow card) 90+4'	Stadium: Ipurua; Attendance: 0 Referee: José María Sánchez Martínez

6 February 2021 22	Sevilla	3–0	Getafe	Seville
21:00 CET (UTC+1)	Gudelj (yellow card) 38'; Munir 67'; A. Gómez 87'; En-Nesyri 89'	Report	Cucurella (yellow card) 9'; Djené (red card) 54'; Mata (yellow card) 69'; Timor (yellow card) 73'; Suárez (yellow card) 90+1'	Stadium: Ramón Sánchez Pizjuán; Attendance: 0 Referee: Juan Martínez Munuera

13 February 2021 23	Sevilla	1–0	Huesca	Seville
16:15 CET (UTC+1)	Munir 57'; De Jong (yellow card) 63'; En-Nesyri (yellow card) 87'; Bounou (yellow card) 90'	Report	Doumbia (yellow card) 40'; Mir (yellow card) 51'; Galán (yellow card) 63'; Insua (yellow card) 80'	Stadium: Ramón Sánchez Pizjuán; Attendance: 0 Referee: David Medié Jiménez

22 February 2021 24	Osasuna	0–2	Sevilla	Pamplona
21:00 CET (UTC+1)	Vidal (yellow card) 76'; Torró (yellow card) 88'	Report	Diego Carlos 19'; De Jong 49'; Munir (yellow card) 67'; Jordán (yellow card) 83'	Stadium: El Sadar; Attendance: 0 Referee: Javier Alberola Rojas

27 February 2021 25	Sevilla	0–2	Barcelona	Seville
16:15 CET (UTC+1)	Fernando (yellow card) 31'; Diego Carlos (yellow card) 38'; Escudero (yellow card) 45'; Rekik (yellow card) 46'; Jordán (yellow card) 88'	Report	Dembélé 29', (yellow card) 82'; Messi (yellow card) 42', (goal) 85'	Stadium: Ramón Sánchez Pizjuán; Attendance: 0 Referee: Alejandro Hernández Hernández

6 March 2021 26	Elche	2–1	Sevilla	Elche
16:15 CET (UTC+1)	Marcone (yellow card) 2'; Boyé (yellow card) 47'; Barragán (yellow card) 64'; Guti 70'; Carrillo 76'; Fidel (yellow card) 90+2'	Report	De Jong 90'	Stadium: Martínez Valero; Attendance: 0 Referee: Valentín Pizarro Gómez

14 March 2021 27	Sevilla	1–0	Real Betis	Seville
21:00 CET (UTC+1)	En-Nesyri 27'; Ocampos (yellow card) 70'; Diego Carlos (yellow card) 72'; Jordán (yellow card) 88'	Report	Canales (yellow card) 38'; Ruibal (yellow card) 47'; Moreno (yellow card) 82'; Joaquín (yellow card) 85'; Carvalho (yellow card) 90'	Stadium: Ramón Sánchez Pizjuán; Attendance: 0 Referee: Antonio Mateu Lahoz

17 March 2021 2	Sevilla	2–0	Elche	Seville
19:00 CET (UTC+1)	S. Gómez (yellow card) 10'; Óscar (yellow card) 39'; En-Nesyri 43'; Vázquez 89'	Report	Mojica (yellow card) 78'	Stadium: Ramón Sánchez Pizjuán; Attendance: 0 Referee: Javier Alberola Rojas
Note: Match originally scheduled for 20 September 2020, but postponed due to the delayed conclusion of last season's UEFA club competitions.

20 March 2021 28	Valladolid	1–1	Sevilla	Valladolid
21:00 CET (UTC+1)	Orellana 44' (pen.), (yellow card) 64'; Mesa (yellow card) 52'; Olaza (yellow card) 52'	Report	Bounou 90+4', (yellow card) 90+5'	Stadium: José Zorrilla; Attendance: 0 Referee: Xavier Estrada Fernández

4 April 2021 29	Sevilla	1–0	Atlético Madrid	Seville
21:00 CEST (UTC+2)	Ocampos (penalty missed) 8'; Diego Carlos (yellow card) 10'; Acuña (yellow card) 56', (goal) 70'	Report	Felipe (yellow card) 5'; Suárez (yellow card) 56'; Llorente (yellow card) 79'; Kondogbia (yellow card) 86'	Stadium: Ramón Sánchez Pizjuán; Attendance: 0 Referee: Jesús Gil Manzano

12 April 2021 30	Celta Vigo	3–4	Sevilla	Vigo
21:00 CEST (UTC+2)	Aspas (yellow card) 10', (goal) 20' (pen.), 23'; Méndez 43', (yellow card) 74'; Mallo (yellow card) 50'	Report	Koundé 7', (yellow card) 19'; Fernando 35'; Diego Carlos (yellow card) 58'; Rakitić 60'; A. Gómez 76'	Stadium: Balaídos; Attendance: 0 Referee: Alejandro Hernández Hernández

18 April 2021 33	Real Sociedad	1–2	Sevilla	San Sebastián
14:00 CEST (UTC+2)	Fernández 5', (yellow card) 59'; Isak (yellow card) 63'; Barrenetxea (yellow card) 74'	Report	Fernando 22'; En-Nesyri 24'; Diego Carlos (yellow card) 51'; Jordán (yellow card) 71'	Stadium: Anoeta; Attendance: 0 Referee: Santiago Jaime Latre
Note: The match was originally scheduled for 28 April 2021, but was brought forward by La Liga.

21 April 2021 31	Levante	0–1	Sevilla	Valencia
19:00 CEST (UTC+2)	Bardhi (yellow card) 31'; Melero (yellow card) 33'; Doukouré (yellow card) 76'; Rochina (yellow card) 88'	Report	Acuña (yellow card) 45'; En-Nesyri 53'	Stadium: Ciutat de València; Attendance: 0 Referee: Valentín Pizarro Gómez

25 April 2021 32	Sevilla	2–1	Granada	Seville
18:30 CEST (UTC+2)	Rakitić 16' (pen.); Ocampos 53'; Acuña (yellow card) 90'; Koundé (yellow card) 90+2'	Report	Kenedy (yellow card) 34'; Puertas (yellow card) 67'; Montoro (yellow card) 87'; Soldado 90' (pen.)	Stadium: Ramón Sánchez Pizjuán; Attendance: 0 Referee: Ricardo de Burgos Bengoetxea

3 May 2021 34	Sevilla	0–1	Athletic Bilbao	Seville
21:00 CEST (UTC+2)	Diego Carlos (yellow card) 35'	Report	I. Williams 90'	Stadium: Ramón Sánchez Pizjuán; Attendance: 0 Referee: Jesús Gil Manzano

9 May 2021 35	Real Madrid	2–2	Sevilla	Madrid
21:00 CEST (UTC+2)	Casemiro (yellow card) 21'; Asensio 67'; Diego Carlos 90+4' (o.g.)	Report	Fernando 22'; Suso (yellow card) 56'; Rakitić 78' (pen.); Gudelj (yellow card) 85'	Stadium: Alfredo Di Stéfano; Attendance: 0 Referee: Juan Martínez Munuera

12 May 2021 36	Sevilla	1–0	Valencia	Seville
19:00 CEST (UTC+2)	Escudero (yellow card) 7'; Gudelj (yellow card) 37'; En-Nesyri 66'	Report	Soler (yellow card) 80'; Gabriel (yellow card) 90+3'	Stadium: Ramón Sánchez Pizjuán; Attendance: 0 Referee: Xavier Estrada Fernández

16 May 2021 37	Villarreal	4–0	Sevilla	Villarreal
18:30 CEST (UTC+2)	Bacca 34', 47', 79'; Gerard 66'	Report	Diego Carlos (yellow card) 29' (yellow-red card) 52'; Acuña (yellow card) 51'	Stadium: Estadio de la Cerámica; Attendance: 0 Referee: Guillermo Cuadra Fernández

23 May 2021 38	Sevilla	1–0	Alavés	Seville
21:00 CEST (UTC+2)	Vidal (yellow card) 29'; Gómez 90+2'	Report		Stadium: Ramón Sánchez Pizjuán; Attendance: 0 Referee: Isidro Díaz De Mera Escuderos

=== Copa del Rey ===
15 December 2020 First round	Ciudad de Lucena	0–3	Sevilla	Lucena
20:00 CET (UTC+1)	Conejero (yellow card) 6'	Report	Óscar 2'; De Jong 14'; Vázquez (yellow card) 25'; Jordán 45' (pen.); S. Gómez (yellow card) 76'	Stadium: Ciudad de Lucena; Referee: Javier Alberola Rojas

5 January 2021 Second round	Linares	0–2	Sevilla	Linares
19:00 CET (UTC+1)	Cruz (yellow card) 45'; Carnicer (yellow card) 45+2'; Lara (yellow card) 73'	Report	Óscar 45+1'; Lara 47' (o.g.)	Stadium: Linarejos; Referee: Isidro Díaz de Mera Escuderos

16 January 2021 Round of 32	Leganés	0–1 (a.e.t.)	Sevilla	Madrid (Note: Given the impossibility of being able to play the match at the Butarque stadium in Leganés due to the consequences of the “Filomena” storm.)
20:00 CET (UTC+1)	Rosales (yellow card) 19'; Pardo (yellow card) 89'; Shibasaki (yellow card) 114'; Bustinza (yellow card) 119'	Report	Vidal (yellow card) 23'; Gudelj (yellow card) 57'; Ocampos 96'	Stadium: Wanda Metropolitano; Referee: Pablo González Fuertes

27 January 2021 Round of 16	Sevilla	3–0	Valencia	Seville
19:00 CET (UTC+1)	De Jong 20', 33'; Rakitić 38'; Acuña (yellow card) 62'; Vidal (yellow card) 80'; Munir (yellow card) 90+2'	Report		Stadium: Ramón Sánchez Pizjuán; Referee: Carlos del Cerro Grande

2 February 2021 Quarter-finals	Almería	0–1	Sevilla	Almería
21:00 CET (UTC+1)	Corpas (yellow card) 69'; Chumi (yellow card) 81'	Report	Ocampos 67'	Stadium: Juegos Mediterráneos; Referee: Xavier Estrada Fernández

10 February 2021 Semi-finals; First leg	Sevilla	2–0	Barcelona	Seville
21:00 CET (UTC+1)	Koundé 25'; Jordán (yellow card) 64'; Escudero (yellow card) 66'; Vidal (yellow card) 84'; Rakitić 85'	Report	Alba (yellow card) 45+2'	Stadium: Ramón Sánchez Pizjuán; Referee: Antonio Mateu Lahoz

3 March 2021 Semi-finals; Second leg	Barcelona	3–0 (a.e.t.) (3–2 agg.)	Sevilla	Barcelona
21:00 CET (UTC+1)	Dembélé 12'; Mingueza (yellow card) 67'; Messi (yellow card) 73'; Piqué 90+4'; Braithwaite 95'; Trincão (yellow card) 119'	Report	Fernando (yellow card) 37' (yellow-red card) 90+2'; Ocampos (penalty missed) 73'; Jordán (yellow card) 100'; Koundé (yellow card) 101'; En-Nesyri (yellow card) 103'; De Jong (red card) 103'	Stadium: Camp Nou; Referee: José María Sánchez Martínez
Note: Luuk de Jong was sent off for dissent after being substituted.

=== UEFA Champions League ===
==== Group stage ====
The group stage draw was held on 1 October 2020.

Pos	Team	Pld	W	D	L	GF	GA	GD	Pts	Qualification	CHE	SEV	KRA	REN
1	(England) Chelsea	6	4	2	0	14	2	+12	14	Advance to knockout phase	—	0–0	1–1	3–0
2	(Spain) Sevilla	6	4	1	1	9	8	+1	13	Advance to knockout phase	0–4	—	3–2	1–0
3	(Russia) Krasnodar	6	1	2	3	6	11	−5	5	Transfer to Europa League	0–4	1–2	—	1–0
4	(France) Rennes	6	0	1	5	3	11	−8	1		1–2	1–3	1–1	—

Source: UEFA
Rules for classification: Group stage tiebreakers

20 October 2020 1	Chelsea (England)	0–0	(Spain) Sevilla	London, England
21:00 CEST (UTC+2)	Jorginho (yellow card) 14'; Mount (yellow card) 36'; Chilwell (yellow card) 64'	Report	Acuña (yellow card) 43'; Jordán (yellow card) 87'	Stadium: Stamford Bridge; Attendance: 0 (Note: Due to the COVID-19 pandemic in Europe, the match was played behind closed doors.); Referee: Davide Massa (Italy)

28 October 2020 2	Sevilla (Spain)	1–0	(France) Rennes	Seville, Spain
21:00 CET (UTC+1)	Torres (yellow card) 31'; Acuña (yellow card) 53'; De Jong 56'	Report	Léa Siliki (yellow card) 58'; Martin (yellow card) 62'; Da Silva (yellow card) 87'	Stadium: Ramón Sánchez Pizjuán; Attendance: 0 Referee: Cüneyt Çakır (Turkey)

4 November 2020 3	Sevilla (Spain)	3–2	(Russia) Krasnodar	Seville, Spain
21:00 CET (UTC+1)	Koundé (yellow card) 16'; Rakitić 42'; Navas (red card) 45+5'; Óscar (yellow card) 49'; En-Nesyri 69', 72'	Report	Suleymanov 17'; Berg 21' (pen.), (yellow card) 90'; Spertsyan (yellow card) 51'; Pantaleão (yellow card) 59'	Stadium: Ramón Sánchez Pizjuán; Attendance: 0 Referee: Felix Brych (Germany)

24 November 2020 4	Krasnodar (Russia)	1–2	(Spain) Sevilla	Krasnodar, Russia
18:55 CET (UTC+1)	Suleymanov (yellow card) 19'; Wanderson 56'	Report	Rakitić 4'; Jordán (yellow card) 58'; Munir 90+5'	Stadium: Krasnodar Stadium; Attendance: 0 Referee: Marco Guida (Italy)

2 December 2020 5	Sevilla (Spain)	0–4	(England) Chelsea	Seville, Spain
21:00 CET (UTC+1)	Gudelj (yellow card) 15'; Idrissi (yellow card) 41'; S. Gómez (yellow card) 82'; Jordán (yellow card) 90+1'	Report	Giroud 8', 54', 74', 83' (pen.); Kovačić (yellow card) 37'; Pulisic (yellow card) 43'; Mount (yellow card) 90+1'; Ziyech (yellow card) 90+1'	Stadium: Ramón Sánchez Pizjuán; Attendance: 0 Referee: Artur Soares Dias (Portugal)

8 December 2020 6	Rennes (France)	1–3	(Spain) Sevilla	Rennes, France
21:00 CET (UTC+1)	Traoré (yellow card) 23'; Grenier (yellow card) 45'; Da Silva (yellow card) 62'; Soppy (yellow card) 72'; Rutter 86' (pen.)	Report	En-Nesyri (yellow card) 23', (goal) 45+2', 81'; Koundé 32'; Rekik (yellow card) 50'	Stadium: Roazhon Park; Attendance: 0 Referee: Bartosz Frankowski (Poland)

==== Knockout phase ====
===== Round of 16 =====
The draw for the round of 16 was held on 14 December 2020.

17 February 2021 First leg	Sevilla (Spain)	2–3	(Germany) Borussia Dortmund	Seville, Spain
21:00 CET (UTC+1)	Suso 7'; De Jong 84'; Óscar (yellow card) 88'	Report	Dahoud 19'; Haaland 27', 43', (yellow card) 90+1'; Hummels (yellow card) 73'	Stadium: Ramón Sánchez Pizjuán; Attendance: 0 Referee: Danny Makkelie (Netherlands)

9 March 2021 Second leg	Borussia Dortmund (Germany)	2–2 (5–4 agg.)	(Spain) Sevilla	Dortmund, Germany
21:00 CET (UTC+1)	Morey (yellow card) 20'; Haaland 35', 54' (pen.), (yellow card) 55'; Can (yellow card) 67'	Report	Acuña (yellow card) 40'; Koundé (yellow card) 51'; Jordán (yellow card) 55'; En-Nesyri 69' (pen.), 90+6'; Óscar (yellow card) 71'; Fernando (yellow card) 76'; Diego Carlos (yellow card) 77'	Stadium: Westfalenstadion; Attendance: 0 Referee: Cüneyt Çakır (Turkey)

=== UEFA Super Cup ===
24 September 2020 Final	Bayern Munich (Germany)	2–1 (a.e.t.)	(Spain) Sevilla	Budapest, Hungary
21:00 CEST (UTC+2)	Alaba (yellow card) 12'; Goretzka 34'; Hernandez (yellow card) 90+1'; Martínez 104'	Report	Ocampos 13' (pen.); Jordán (yellow card) 45+1'; Koundé (yellow card) 55'; Fernando (yellow card) 70'; Escudero (yellow card) 119'	Stadium: Puskás Aréna; Attendance: 15,180; Referee: Anthony Taylor (England)

== Statistics ==
=== Squad appearances and goals ===
Last updated on 23 May 2021.

No.	Pos	Nat	Player	Total		La Liga		Champions League		Copa del Rey		UEFA Super Cup	
No.	Pos	Nat	Player	Apps	Goals	Apps	Goals	Apps	Goals	Apps	Goals	Apps	Goals
Goalkeepers
1	GK	(Czech Republic) CZE	Tomáš Vaclík	8	0	5	0	2	0	1	0	0	0
13	GK	(Morocco) MAR	Yassine Bounou	45	1	33	1	5	0	6	0	1	0
33	GK	(Spain) ESP	Alfonso Pastor	1	0	0	0	1	0	0	0	0	0
Defenders
2	DF	(France) FRA	Joris Gnagnon	1	0	0	0	0	0	0+1	0	0	0
3	DF	(Spain) ESP	Sergi Gómez	16	0	9	0	3	0	4	0	0	0
4	DF	(Netherlands) NED	Karim Rekik	22	0	6+5	0	2+2	0	4+3	0	0	0
12	DF	(France) FRA	Jules Koundé	49	4	33+1	2	6+1	1	5+2	1	1	0
16	DF	(Spain) ESP	Jesús Navas	43	0	34	0	6	0	1+1	0	1	0
17	DF	(Spain) ESP	Aleix Vidal	19	0	5+7	0	0	0	6+1	0	0	0
18	DF	(Spain) ESP	Sergio Escudero	14	1	7+2	1	3	0	1	0	1	0
19	DF	(Argentina) ARG	Marcos Acuña	37	1	26+4	1	3+1	0	2+1	0	0	0
20	DF	(Brazil) BRA	Diego Carlos	46	1	32+1	1	8	0	4	0	1	0
Midfielders
6	MF	(Serbia) SRB	Nemanja Gudelj	44	0	10+20	0	5+2	0	4+2	0	0+1	0
8	MF	(Spain) ESP	Joan Jordán	50	2	28+7	1	4+3	0	5+2	1	1	0
10	MF	(Croatia) CRO	Ivan Rakitić	50	8	25+12	4	6+2	2	3+1	2	1	0
14	MF	(Spain) ESP	Óscar Rodríguez	29	2	4+16	0	3+3	0	2+1	2	0	0
21	MF	(Spain) ESP	Óliver Torres	47	0	15+18	0	2+5	0	4+2	0	0+1	0
22	MF	(Argentina) ARG	Franco Vázquez	22	1	1+14	1	1+3	0	1+1	0	0+1	0
25	MF	(Brazil) BRA	Fernando	44	3	28+3	3	5+2	0	4+1	0	1	0
Forwards
5	FW	(Argentina) ARG	Lucas Ocampos	46	8	30+4	5	5+2	0	1+3	2	1	1
7	FW	(Spain) ESP	Suso	44	4	28+6	3	4	1	3+2	0	1	0
9	FW	(Netherlands) NED	Luuk de Jong	48	9	14+20	4	4+2	2	6+1	3	1	0
11	FW	(Morocco) MAR	Munir	36	5	9+15	4	3+3	1	3+3	0	0	0
15	FW	(Morocco) MAR	Youssef En-Nesyri	52	24	23+15	18	4+4	6	2+3	0	0+1	0
24	FW	(Argentina) ARG	Alejandro Gómez	23	3	11+7	3	1+1	0	2+1	0	0	0
30	FW	(Spain) ESP	Antonio Zarzana	1	0	0	0	0	0	0+1	0	0	0
Players who have made an appearance this season but have left the club
23	FW	(Morocco) MAR	Oussama Idrissi	10	0	0+3	0	2+1	0	3+1	0	0	0
24	FW	(Spain) ESP	Carlos Fernández	7	0	2+3	0	0+1	0	0+1	0	0	0
29	FW	(Spain) ESP	Bryan Gil	1	0	0+1	0	0	0	0	0	0	0

=== Goalscorers ===
As of 23 May 2021

Rank	No.	Pos	Nat	Name	La Liga	Copa del Rey	Champions League	UEFA Super Cup	Total
1	15	FW	(Morocco)	Youssef En-Nesyri	18	0	6	0	24
2	9	FW	(Netherlands)	Luuk de Jong	4	3	2	0	9
3	5	FW	(Argentina)	Lucas Ocampos	5	2	0	1	8
3	10	MF	(Croatia)	Ivan Rakitić	4	2	2	0	8
5	11	FW	(Morocco)	Munir	4	0	1	0	5
6	7	MF	(Spain)	Suso	3	0	1	0	4
6	12	DF	(France)	Jules Koundé	2	1	1	0	4
8	25	MF	(Brazil)	Fernando Reges	3	0	0	0	3
8	24	FW	(Argentina)	Alejandro Gómez	3	0	0	0	3
10	14	MF	(Spain)	Óscar Rodríguez	0	2	0	0	2
10	8	MF	(Spain)	Joan Jordán	1	1	0	0	2
12	13	GK	(Morocco)	Yassine Bounou	1	0	0	0	1
12	18	DF	(Spain)	Sergio Escudero	1	0	0	0	1
12	19	DF	(Argentina)	Marcos Acuña	1	0	0	0	1
12	20	DF	(Brazil)	Diego Carlos	1	0	0	0	1
12	22	MF	(Argentina)	Franco Vázquez	1	0	0	0	1
Own goals					1	1	0	0	2
Totals					53	12	13	1	79

=== Clean sheets ===
Last updated on 23 May 2021

No.	Name	La Liga	Copa del Rey	UEFA Champions League	UEFA Super Cup	Total	Starts
1	(Czech Republic) Tomáš Vaclík	2	0	0	0	1	8
13	(Morocco) Yassine Bounou	15	6	2	0	22	45
33	(Spain) Alfonso Pastor	0	0	0	0	0	1
Totals		17	6	2	0	25	54

=== Disciplinary record ===
Includes all competitive matches.

N	P	Nat.	Name	La Liga			Champions League			Copa del Rey			UEFA Super Cup			Total			Notes
N	P	Nat.	Name	Yellow card	Second yellow card	Red card	Yellow card	Second yellow card	Red card	Yellow card	Second yellow card	Red card	Yellow card	Second yellow card	Red card	Yellow card	Second yellow card	Red card	Notes
3	DF	(Spain)	Sergi Gómez	2			1			1						4			
4	DF	(Netherlands)	Karim Rekik	2			1									3			
5	FW	(Argentina)	Lucas Ocampos	3												3			
6	MF	(Serbia)	Nemanja Gudelj	8			1			1						10			
7	RW	(Spain)	Suso	2												2			
8	MF	(Spain)	Joan Jordán	6	1		4			2			1			13	1		
9	FW	(Netherlands)	Luuk de Jong	3								1				3		1	
10	MF	(Croatia)	Ivan Rakitić	5												5			
11	RW	(Morocco)	Munir	2						1						3			
12	DF	(France)	Jules Koundé	4			2			1			1			8			
13	GK	(Morocco)	Yassine Bounou	3												3			
14	AM	(Spain)	Óscar Rodríguez	1			3									4			
15	FW	(Morocco)	Youssef En-Nesyri	2			1			1						4			
16	RB	(Spain)	Jesús Navas	4					1	1						5		1	
17	RB	(Spain)	Aleix Vidal	2						4						6			
18	LB	(Spain)	Sergio Escudero	3						1			1			5			
19	LB	(Argentina)	Marcos Acuña	5			3			1						9			
20	DF	(Brazil)	Diego Carlos	9	1		1									10	1		
21	MF	(Spain)	Óliver Torres	2			1									3			
22	MF	(Argentina)	Franco Vázquez	1						1						2			
~~23~~	LW	(Morocco)	Oussama Idrissi				1									1			
25	MF	(Brazil)	Fernando	6			1				1		1			8	1		

Last updated: 23 May 2021
Source: ESPNFC.com
Only competitive matches
Ordered by (red card) , (second yellow card) and (yellow card)
(yellow card) = Number of bookings; (second yellow card) = Number of sending offs after a second yellow card; (red card) = Number of sending offs by a direct red card.
