= Youssef En-Nesyri =

Moroccan footballer (born 1997)

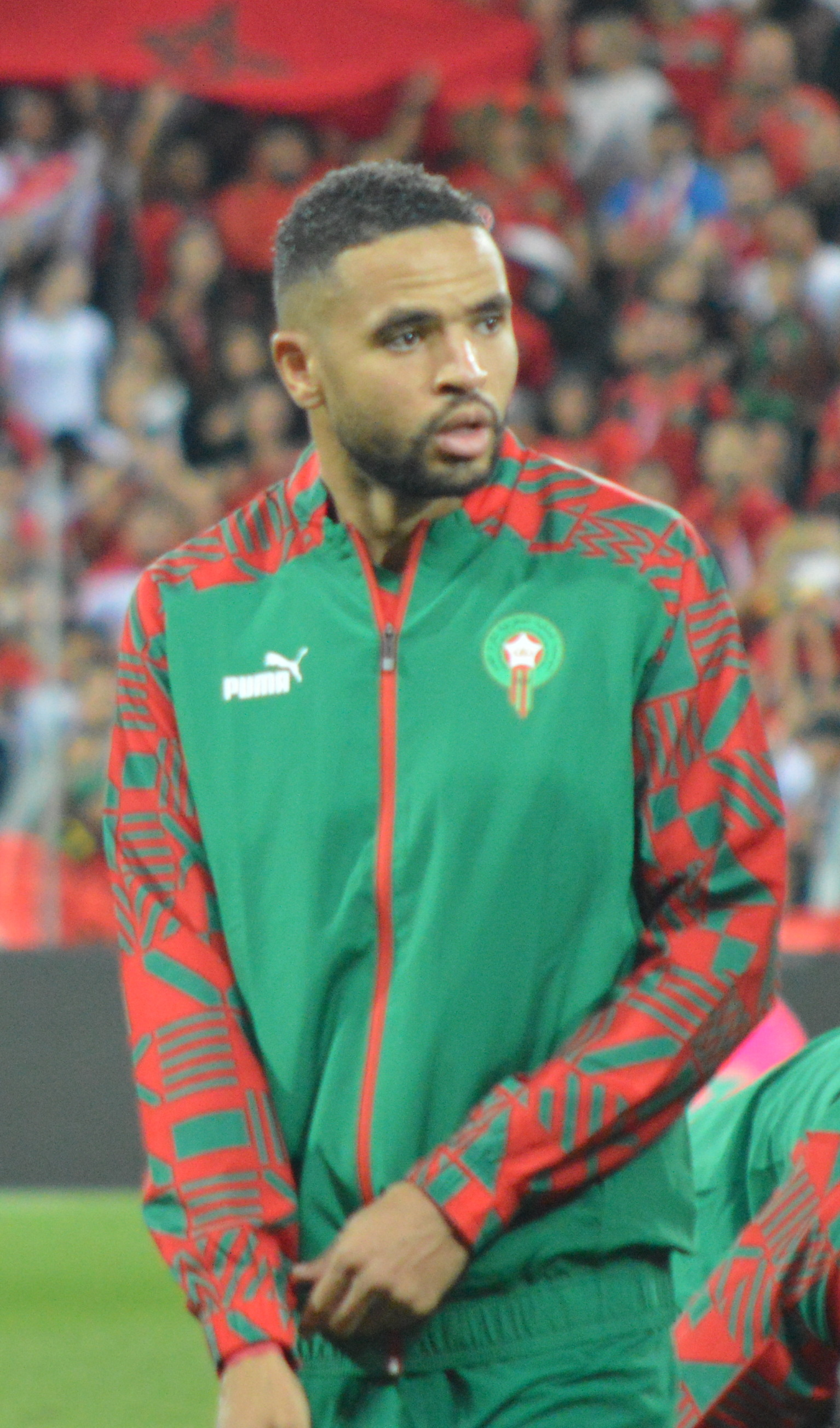
- En-Nesyri with Morocco in 2023

Personal information
- Full name: Youssef En-Nesyri
- Date of birth: 1 June 1997 (age 29)
- Place of birth: Fez, Morocco
- Height: 1.88 m (6 ft 2 in)
- Position: Striker

Team information
- Current team: Al-Ittihad
- Number: 21

Youth career
- 2010–2011: Maghreb de Fès
- 2011–2016: Mohammed VI Academy

Senior career*
| Years | Team | Apps | (Gls) |
| 2016–2017 | Málaga B | 10 | (9) |
| 2016–2018 | Málaga | 38 | (5) |
| 2018–2020 | Leganés | 49 | (13) |
| 2020–2024 | Sevilla | 143 | (51) |
| 2024–2026 | Fenerbahçe | 50 | (27) |
| 2026– | Al-Ittihad | 24 | (13) |

International career^{‡}
| 2015–2016 | Morocco U20 | 7 | (3) |
| 2016– | Morocco | 93 | (26) |
Medal record
Men's football
Representing Morocco
Africa Cup of Nations
| Winner | 2025 Morocco |
- * Club domestic league appearances and goals as of 30 October 2026 ‡ National team caps and goals as of 13 November 2026

Youssef En-Nesyri (Arabic: يوسف النصيري; pronounced [ju:suf ʔan.nasˤi:ri:]; born 1 June 1997) is a Moroccan professional footballer who plays as a striker for Saudi Pro League club Al-Ittihad and the Morocco national team.

After representing local youth teams, especially the King Mohammed VI football academy, En-Nesyri spent the first eight years of his career in Spain, representing Málaga, Leganés and Sevilla. He made over 200 La Liga appearances before his transfer to Fenerbahçe in 2024. On 3 February 2026, he moved to the Saudi Pro League, joining Al-Ittihad.

En-Nesyri made his international debut in 2016 aged 18, after previously being capped by the nation's youth teams at under-20 level. He was chosen in Morocco's squads for the FIFA World Cup in 2018 and 2022. He was also picked for the Africa Cup of Nations in 2017, 2019, 2021, 2023, and 2025.

== Club career ==
=== Málaga ===
After starting his youth career at Maghreb de Fès and Mohammed VI Football Academy, En-Nesyri joined Málaga for a fee of €125,000 in 2015. Initially assigned to the Juvenil squad, he made his senior debut for the reserves on 16 April 2016, scoring the last goal in a 3–1 Tercera División away win against Guadix. He netted back-to-back goals in the following three matches against Huétor Tájar, River Melilla and Vilafranca, and went on to become an integral player for the reserve side which narrowly missed promotion to the Segunda División B. On 8 July 2016, En-Nesyri was included in first team manager Juande Ramos' pre-season squad, and scored a double in a 4–0 friendly win against Algeciras eight days later.

On 23 August 2016, after scoring six goals during the pre-season, Youssef En-Nesyri agreed to a contract extension until 2020. Three days later he made his professional – and La Liga – debut, coming on as a late substitute for Keko in a 2–2 away draw against Espanyol. En-Nesyri scored his first professional goal on 21 September 2016, netting the winner in a 2–1 home victory against Eibar, after coming on as a substitute for Charles. He contributed with four goals in 25 league appearances during the 2017–18 campaign, as his side suffered relegation.

=== Leganés ===
On 17 August 2018, following Málaga's relegation from La Liga, En-Nesyri signed a five-year contract with Leganés to remain in the top flight He scored his first goals in his ninth game, to earn a 2–2 home draw with nearby Rayo Vallecano in the first leg of the last 32 of the Copa del Rey on 30 October, and on 23 November he netted his first league goal, the only one of a victory also at the Estadio Municipal de Butarque against a Alavés team that was challenging for top spot.

In late January to February 2019, En-Nesyri scored six goals in three games as Leganés avoided defeat: a brace in a 2–2 draw with Eibar, the late winner at Rayo and then all three goals against Real Betis; this last result made him the first Pepinero to net a hat-trick in La Liga. Due to his performances, he was awarded the Cinco Estrellas Player of the Month in January 2019 and February 2019.

=== Sevilla ===
On 16 January 2020, Sevilla signed Youssef En-Nesyri from Leganés for a reported €20 million, on a contract lasting to June 2025; the Andalusians had recently sold their strikers Mu'nas Dabbur and Javier Hernández. He debuted two days later in a 2–1 loss at Real Madrid, as a 65th-minute substitute for Munir El Haddadi, and on his first start on 9 February he opened the scoring on a trip to Celta Vigo with the same result.

En-Nesyri made his debut in European competitions on 20 February 2020, in the UEFA Europa League last 32 first leg away to CFR Cluj in Romania. He scored the late equaliser in a 1–1 draw, that put his team through on the away goals rule. On 6 August 2020, he scored a goal in a 2–0 win over Roma in the round of 16. Sevilla went on to win the 2020 UEFA Europa League. On 4 November 2020, En-Nesyri scored a brace in a 3–2 win over Krasnodar in the UEFA Champions League group stage, his first goals in the competition. On 8 December, he scored another brace in a 3–1 away win over Rennes.

In January 2021, En-Nesyri scored hat-tricks in home wins over Real Sociedad (3–2) and Cádiz (3–0). On 9 March 2021, he scored a brace in a 2–2 away draw against Borussia Dortmund in the second leg of the Champions League round of 16; however, Sevilla were eliminated as they lost 4–5 on aggregate. On 14 March, he scored the winning goal in a 1–0 win over Real Betis in the Seville derby. On 4 April 2021, En-Nesyri marked his hundredth match played for the team against Barcelona. On 22 April 2021, he scored the only goal in a 1–0 victory against Levante, thus becoming the highest goal scoring Moroccan in a single La Liga season with 17 goals, surpassing Youssef El-Arabi's 16 goal mark, he ended the season with 18 La Liga goals. In the 2022–23 UEFA Europa League, En-Nesyri scored a brace in a 3–0 victory against Manchester United in the quarter-finals. Three days later, he scored the winning goal in a 2–1 victory against Valencia. On 11 May 2023, En-Nesyri scored Sevilla's first leg goal in a 1–1 draw away at the Juventus Stadium against Juventus in the Europa League semi-finals.

In the 2023 UEFA Super Cup, he scored a goal in a 1–1 tie, before losing on penalties to Manchester City. On 4 October 2023, En-Nesyri scored a goal in a 2–2 draw against PSV in the 2023–24 UEFA Champions League, thus making him the best Moroccan scorer in the history of the UEFA Champions League with 9 goals, surpassing Marouane Chamakh, who scored 8 goals. On 1 November 2023, En-Nesyri was nominated for the 2023 African Footballer of the Year by CAF. On 5 February 2024, he scored a brace in a 2–1 victory against Rayo Vallecano, making him the highest-scoring Moroccan player in La Liga's history, he surpassed the previous record of 58 goals held by the late Atlético de Madrid and Morocco striker Larbi Benbarek.

=== Fenerbahçe ===
On 24 July 2024, En-Nesyri joined Fenerbahçe on a five-year contract for €19.5 million, making him the most expensive player in the club's history and broke the transfer record in Süper Lig. On 6 August 2024, En-Nesyri made his debut for the club in a Champions League third qualifying round match against Lille. On 17 August 2024, he made his first Süper Lig appearance and scored his first goal, a header, in an away match against Göztepe. On 24 October 2024, he scored his first continental goal against Manchester United in a 1–1 tie UEFA Europa League league phase match. On 9 January 2025, he made his Turkish Cup debut in group stage a 3–0 win over Kasımpaşa, he also scored a goal in the match.

=== Al-Ittihad ===
On 3 February 2026, En-Nesyri joined Saudi Pro League club Al-Ittihad. (Note: In early February 2026, En-Nesyri was close to joining Al-Ittihad as part of a high-profile swap deal with Fenerbahçe, which would have seen N'Golo Kanté move in the opposite direction. The transfer collapsed on deadline day due to administrative errors by Al-Ittihad in the FIFA Transfer Matching System (TMS). Fenerbahçe blamed Al-Ittihad for the failure, and unsuccessful appeals meant En-Nesyri remained with the club beyond the transfer window. FIFA later stepped in to resolve the TMS issues, enabling the transfer to proceed.)

== International career ==
After representing Morocco at under-20 level, En-Nesyri was called up to the full squad by manager Hervé Renard on 22 August 2016, for friendlies against Albania and São Tomé and Príncipe. He made his debut against the former nine days later, starting in a 0–0 draw at the Loro Boriçi Stadium in Shkodër. Youssef En-Nesyri was called up for the 2017 Africa Cup of Nations in Gabon, and scored in the second group game in a 3–1 win over Togo. He was a late addition to the squad for the 2018 FIFA World Cup in Russia, at the expense of defender Badr Benoun. In the last group game against Spain at the Kaliningrad Stadium, he gave the team a late lead in a 2–2 draw.

At the 2019 Africa Cup of Nations in Egypt, En-Nesyri scored the only goal of a win over the Ivory Coast to send the Atlas Lions into the last 16. There, he equalised against Benin as the game went to a penalty shoot-out, in which Saturnin Allagbé saved from him to knock the Moroccans out. En-Nesyri was also called up for the 2021 Africa Cup of Nations in Cameroon. In his first game back after a long injury, he came on in the 65th minute for Ayoub El Kaabi and missed a penalty in a 2–0 win over Comoros. He scored the equaliser in a 2–1 win over Malawi in the last 16.

On 10 November 2022, he was named in Morocco's 23-man squad for the 2022 FIFA World Cup in Qatar. On 10 December, in their quarter-final match against Portugal, En-Nesyri jumped 2.78 metres (9.1 ft) to score the lone goal to put Morocco through to the semi-finals, This made Morocco the first African and Arab team to qualify for the World Cup semi-final. On 17 January 2024, En-Nesyri scored a goal in a 3–0 victory against Tanzania in the 2023 Africa Cup of Nations, thus becoming the first Moroccan player to score in four different Africa Cup of Nations editions. On 11 December 2025, En-Nesyri was called up to the Morocco squad for the 2025 Africa Cup of Nations. With the appointment of Mohamed Ouahbi as manager, En-Nesyri was left out of the squad for the 2026 FIFA World Cup, as the coach opted to build a younger team.

== Personal life ==
On 9 September 2023, En-Nesyri along with his national teammates donated their blood for the needy affected by the 2023 Marrakesh-Safi earthquake.

== Career statistics ==
=== Club ===
As of match played 20 October 2026

Appearances and goals by club, season and competition
| Club | Season | League | | | National cup (Note: Includes Copa del Rey, Turkish Cup, King's Cup) | | Continental | | Other | | Total | |
| Club | Season | Division | Apps | Goals | Apps | Goals | Apps | Goals | Apps | Goals | Apps | Goals |
|---|---|---|---|---|---|---|---|---|---|---|---|---|
| Málaga | 2016–17 | La Liga | 13 | 1 | 2 | 0 | — | | — | | 15 | 1 |
| Málaga | 2017–18 | La Liga | 25 | 4 | 1 | 0 | — | | — | | 26 | 4 |
| Málaga | Total | | 38 | 5 | 3 | 0 | — | | — | | 41 | 5 |
| Leganés | 2018–19 | La Liga | 31 | 9 | 3 | 2 | — | | — | | 34 | 11 |
| Leganés | 2019–20 | La Liga | 18 | 4 | 1 | 0 | — | | — | | 19 | 4 |
| Leganés | Total | | 49 | 13 | 4 | 2 | — | | — | | 53 | 15 |
| Sevilla | 2019–20 | La Liga | 18 | 4 | 2 | 0 | 6 (Note: Appearances in UEFA Europa League) | 2 | — | | 26 | 6 |
| Sevilla | 2020–21 | La Liga | 38 | 18 | 5 | 0 | 8 (Note: Appearances in UEFA Champions League) | 6 | 1 (Note: Appearance in UEFA Super Cup) | 0 | 52 | 24 |
| Sevilla | 2021–22 | La Liga | 23 | 5 | 0 | 0 | 6 (Note: Two appearances in UEFA Champions League, four appearances in UEFA Europa League) | 0 | — | | 29 | 5 |
| Sevilla | 2022–23 | La Liga | 31 | 8 | 4 | 4 | 13 (Note: Four appearances and two goals in UEFA Champions League, nine appearances and four goals in UEFA Europa League) | 6 | — | | 48 | 18 |
| Sevilla | 2023–24 | La Liga | 33 | 16 | 1 | 1 | 6 | 2 | 1 | 1 | 41 | 20 |
| Sevilla | Total | | 143 | 51 | 12 | 5 | 39 | 16 | 2 | 1 | 196 | 73 |
| Fenerbahçe | 2024–25 | Süper Lig | 34 | 20 | 4 | 4 | 14 (Note: Two appearances in UEFA Champions League, twelve appearances and six goals in UEFA Europa League) | 6 | — | | 52 | 30 |
| Fenerbahçe | 2025–26 | Süper Lig | 16 | 7 | 0 | 0 | 11 (Note: Four appearances and one goal in UEFA Champions League, seven appearances in UEFA Europa League) | 1 | 0 | 0 | 27 | 8 |
| Fenerbahçe | Total | | 50 | 27 | 4 | 4 | 25 | 7 | 0 | 0 | 79 | 38 |
| Al-Ittihad | 2025–26 | Saudi Pro League | 13 | 6 | 1 | 0 | 4 (Note: Appearances in AFC Champions League Elite) | 2 | — | | 18 | 8 |
| Al-Ittihad | 2026–27 | Saudi Pro League | 9 | 7 | 0 | 0 | 3 | 0 | — | | 12 | 7 |
| Al-Ittihad | Total | | 22 | 13 | 1 | 0 | 7 | 2 | — | | 30 | 15 |
| Career total | | | 302 | 108 | 24 | 11 | 71 | 25 | 2 | 1 | 399 | 146 |

=== International ===
As of match played 13 November 2026

Appearances and goals by national team and year
| National team | Year | Apps | Goals |
|---|---|---|---|
| Morocco | 2016 | 6 | 0 |
| Morocco | 2017 | 9 | 1 |
| Morocco | 2018 | 7 | 5 |
| Morocco | 2019 | 10 | 3 |
| Morocco | 2020 | 3 | 2 |
| Morocco | 2021 | 5 | 0 |
| Morocco | 2022 | 17 | 6 |
| Morocco | 2023 | 8 | 0 |
| Morocco | 2024 | 13 | 6 |
| Morocco | 2025 | 10 | 2 |
| Morocco | 2026 | 5 | 1 |
| Total | | 93 | 26 |

Scores and results list Morocco's goal tally first, score column indicates score after each En-Nesyri goal.

List of international goals scored by Youssef En-Nesyri
| No. | Date | Venue | Opponent | Score | Result | Competition |
|---|---|---|---|---|---|---|
| 1 | 20 January 2017 | Stade d'Oyem, Oyem, Gabon | Togo | 3–1 | 3–1 | 2017 Africa Cup of Nations |
| 2 | 9 June 2018 | A. Le Coq Arena, Tallinn, Estonia | Estonia | 3–0 | 3–1 | Friendly |
| 3 | 25 June 2018 | Kaliningrad Stadium, Kaliningrad, Russia | Spain | 2–1 | 2–2 | 2018 FIFA World Cup |
| 4 | 8 September 2018 | Stade Mohammed V, Casablanca, Morocco | Malawi | 2–0 | 3–0 | 2019 Africa Cup of Nations qualification |
| 5 | 8 September 2018 | Stade Mohammed V, Casablanca, Morocco | Malawi | 3–0 | 3–0 | 2019 Africa Cup of Nations qualification |
| 6 | 20 November 2018 | Radès Olympic Stadium, Rades, Tunisia | Tunisia | 1–0 | 1–0 | Friendly |
| 7 | 28 June 2019 | Al Salam Stadium, Cairo, Egypt | Ivory Coast | 1–0 | 1–0 | 2019 Africa Cup of Nations |
| 8 | 5 July 2019 | Al Salam Stadium, Cairo, Egypt | Benin | 1–1 | 1–1 (1–4 p) | 2019 Africa Cup of Nations |
| 9 | 19 November 2019 | Intwari Stadium, Bujumbura, Burundi | Burundi | 2–0 | 3–0 | 2021 Africa Cup of Nations qualification |
| 10 | 9 October 2020 | Prince Moulay Abdellah Stadium, Rabat, Morocco | Senegal | 2–0 | 3–1 | Friendly |
| 11 | 17 November 2020 | Reunification Stadium, Douala, Cameroon | Central African Republic | 2–0 | 2–0 | 2021 Africa Cup of Nations qualification |
| 12 | 25 January 2022 | Ahmadou Ahidjo Stadium, Yaoundé, Cameroon | Malawi | 1–1 | 2–1 | 2021 Africa Cup of Nations |
| 13 | 9 June 2022 | Prince Moulay Abdellah Stadium, Rabat, Morocco | South Africa | 1–1 | 2–1 | 2023 Africa Cup of Nations qualification |
| 14 | 13 June 2022 | Stade Mohammed V, Casablanca, Morocco | Liberia | 2–0 | 2–0 | 2023 Africa Cup of Nations qualification |
| 15 | 17 November 2022 | Sharjah Stadium, Sharjah, United Arab Emirates | Georgia | 1–0 | 3–0 | Friendly |
| 16 | 1 December 2022 | Al Thumama Stadium, Doha, Qatar | Canada | 2–0 | 2–1 | 2022 FIFA World Cup |
| 17 | 10 December 2022 | Al Thumama Stadium, Doha, Qatar | Portugal | 1–0 | 1–0 | 2022 FIFA World Cup |
| 18 | 11 January 2024 | Laurent Pokou Stadium, San Pédro, Ivory Coast | Sierra Leone | 1–1 | 3–1 | Friendly |
| 19 | 11 January 2024 | Laurent Pokou Stadium, San Pédro, Ivory Coast | Sierra Leone | 3–1 | 3–1 | Friendly |
| 20 | 17 January 2024 | Laurent Pokou Stadium, San Pédro, Ivory Coast | Tanzania | 3–0 | 3–0 | 2023 Africa Cup of Nations |
| 21 | 15 October 2024 | Honor Stadium, Oujda, Morocco | Central African Republic | 3–0 | 4–0 | 2025 Africa Cup of Nations qualification |
| 22 | 15 November 2024 | Stade de Franceville, Franceville, Gabon | Gabon | 4–1 | 5–1 | 2025 Africa Cup of Nations qualification |
| 23 | 18 November 2024 | Honor Stadium, Oujda, Morocco | Lesotho | 6–0 | 7–0 | 2025 Africa Cup of Nations qualification |
| 24 | 8 September 2025 | Levy Mwanawasa Stadium, Ndola, Zambia | Zambia | 1–0 | 2–0 | 2026 FIFA World Cup qualification |
| 25 | 14 October 2025 | Prince Moulay Abdellah Stadium, Rabat, Morocco | Congo | 1–0 | 1–0 | 2026 FIFA World Cup qualification |
| 26 | 13 November 2026 | Stade Mohammed V, Casablanca, Morocco | Niger | 4–1 | 5–1 | 2027 Africa Cup of Nations qualification |

== Style of play ==
En-Nesyri is described as a tall, powerful striker. He is praised for his heading abilities, and his jumping. He is also described as dangerous on the counter attack due to his speed, and a dangerous player in the box thanks to his smart movement and frame.

== Honours ==
Sevilla

- UEFA Europa League: 2019–20, 2022–23
- UEFA Super Cup runner-up: 2020, 2023

Morocco

- Africa Cup of Nations: 2025

Individual

- Leganés Player of the Season: 2018–19
- France Football CAF Men Team of The Year: 2021
- La Liga Player of the Month: January 2021, April 2023
- UMFP Best Moroccan Player abroad: 2022–23

Orders

- Order of the Throne: 2022
