= Joan Jordán =

Spanish footballer (born 1994)

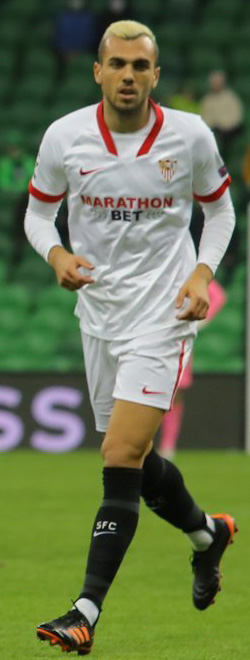
- Jordán with Sevilla in 2020

Personal information
- Full name: Joan Jordán Moreno
- Date of birth: 6 July 1994 (age 32)
- Place of birth: Regencós, Spain
- Height: 1.83 m (6 ft 0 in)
- Position: Central midfielder

Team information
- Current team: Estrela Amadora
- Number: 19

Youth career
- 2002–2005: Palafrugell
- 2005–2008: Bisbalenc
- 2008–2009: Gironès-Sàbat
- 2009–2011: Poblense
- 2011–2013: Espanyol

Senior career*
Years	Team	Apps	(Gls)
2012–2015	Espanyol B	85	(12)
2014–2017	Espanyol	12	(1)
2016–2017	→ Valladolid (loan)	35	(3)
2017–2019	Eibar	71	(10)
2019–2026	Sevilla	139	(3)
2024–2025	→ Alavés (loan)	25	(5)
2026–	Estrela Amadora	6	(0)

International career
2015–2024	Catalonia	3	(0)
- * Club domestic league appearances and goals as of 22:25, 8 November 2026 (UTC)

Joan Jordán Moreno (born 6 July 1994) is a Spanish professional footballer who plays as a central midfielder for Primeira Liga club Estrela da Amadora.

== Club career ==
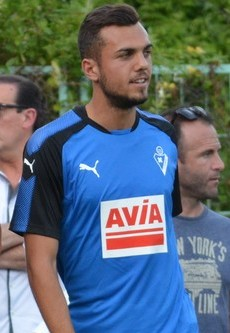
Jordán with Eibar in 2017

=== Espanyol ===
Born in Regencós, Girona, Catalonia, Jordán joined RCD Espanyol's youth system in 2011 at the age of 17, after a stint with lowly UD Poblense. He made his senior debut for the reserves in the 2012–13 season in Segunda División B, becoming a regular starter afterwards.

On 21 August 2014, Jordán signed a new five-year contract with the club, being definitely promoted to the first team. He made his competitive and La Liga debut nine days later, coming on as a substitute for Abraham in the 70th minute of a 1–2 home loss against Sevilla FC.

Jordán scored his first goal in the top flight on 10 January 2016, but in a 2–1 defeat at SD Eibar. On 26 July, he was loaned to Segunda División side Real Valladolid for one year.

=== Eibar ===
On 13 July 2017, Jordán joined Eibar on a three-year deal. In his first season, he contributed six goals and four assists to a final ninth place in the top tier.

=== Sevilla ===
Jordán signed with Sevilla on 27 June 2019, for a reported €14 million. He finished his first year at the Ramón Sánchez-Pizjuán Stadium with 47 competitive games (including ten in their victorious run in the UEFA Europa League), totalling 50 in the 2020–21 campaign.

On 15 January 2022, while he and his teammates celebrated equalising at Real Betis in the round of 16 of the Copa del Rey, Jordán was hit in the head with what appeared to be a metal pole thrown from the stands; the match was abandoned and resumed the following day – without the player, resting at home after being released from hospital– and the home team won 2–1.

On 29 August 2024, Jordán moved to fellow top-tier Deportivo Alavés on a one-year loan. After returning to Sevilla, he was sidelined for several months due to back problems, which required surgery.

Jordán made his 200th competitive appearance for the Andalusians on 7 December 2025, in a 1–1 draw away to Valencia CF.

=== Estrela da Amadora ===
On 10 August 2026, Jordán joined Primeira Liga side Estrela da Amadora on a two-year contract.

== Career statistics ==
As of match played 24 January 2026

Appearances and goals by club, season and competition
Club	Season	League			Copa del Rey		Europe		Other		Total	
Club	Season	Division	Apps	Goals	Apps	Goals	Apps	Goals	Apps	Goals	Apps	Goals
Espanyol	2014–15	La Liga	3	0	2	0	—		—		5	0
Espanyol	2015–16	La Liga	9	1	3	0	—		—		12	1
Espanyol	Total		12	1	5	0	—		—		17	1
Valladolid (loan)	2016–17	Segunda División	35	3	2	0	—		—		37	3
Eibar	2017–18	La Liga	35	6	2	0	—		—		37	6
Eibar	2018–19	La Liga	36	4	2	0	—		—		38	4
Eibar	Total		71	10	4	0	—		—		75	10
Sevilla	2019–20	La Liga	34	2	3	0	10 (Note: Appearances in UEFA Europa League)	0	—		47	2
Sevilla	2020–21	La Liga	35	1	7	1	7 (Note: Appearances in UEFA Champions League)	0	1 (Note: Appearance in UEFA Super Cup)	0	50	2
Sevilla	2021–22	La Liga	36	0	4	0	9 (Note: Six appearances and one goal in UEFA Champions League, three appearances in UEFA Europa League)	1	—		49	1
Sevilla	2022–23	La Liga	23	0	5	1	11 (Note: Six appearances in UEFA Champions League, five appearances and one goal in UEFA Europa League)	1	—		39	2
Sevilla	2023–24	La Liga	8	0	2	0	2	0	1	0	13	0
Sevilla	2025–26	La Liga	3	0	2	0	—		—		5	0
Sevilla	Total		139	3	23	2	39	2	2	0	203	7
Alavés (loan)	2024–25	La Liga	25	5	2	0	—		—		27	5
Career total			282	22	36	2	39	2	2	0	359	26

== Honours ==
Sevilla

- UEFA Europa League: 2019–20, 2022–23
- UEFA Super Cup runner-up: 2020, 2023
