= Gudelj =

Gudelj (Serbian Cyrillic: Гудељ) is a Bosnian, Croatian and Serbian surname.

It may refer to:

- Bruno Gudelj (born 1966), Croatian handball player
- Dragiša Gudelj (born 1997), Serbian footballer
- Gabriela Gudelj (born 1997), Croatian handballer
- Hrvatin Gudelj (born 1978), Croatian footballer
- Ivan Gudelj (born 1960), Croatian footballer
- Nebojša Gudelj (born 1968), Serbian retired footballer
- Nemanja Gudelj (born 1991), Serbian footballer
- Stefan Gudelj (born 2006), Serbian footballer
- Tomislav Gudelj (born 1998), Croatian footballer
- Vladimir Gudelj (born 1966), Bosnian retired footballer
