= Diego Carlos (footballer, born 1993) =

Brazilian footballer (born 1993)

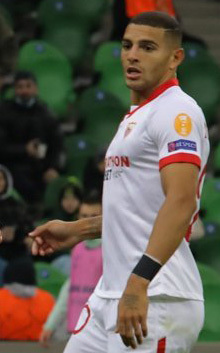
- Diego Carlos with Sevilla in 2020

Personal information
- Full name: Diego Carlos Santos Silva
- Date of birth: 15 March 1993 (age 33)
- Place of birth: Barra Bonita, São Paulo, Brazil
- Height: 1.86 m (6 ft 1 in)
- Position: Centre-back

Team information
- Current team: Parma (on loan from Fenerbahçe)
- Number: 34

Youth career
- 2009–2010: América-SP
- 2010–2012: Desportivo Brasil

Senior career*
Years	Team	Apps	(Gls)
2012–2013	Desportivo Brasil	0	(0)
2013–2014	São Paulo	0	(0)
2013–2014	→ Paulista (loan)	1	(0)
2014	→ Madureira (loan)	2	(0)
2014–2016	Estoril	31	(2)
2014–2015	→ Porto B (loan)	19	(0)
2016–2019	Nantes	97	(4)
2019–2022	Sevilla	102	(6)
2022–2025	Aston Villa	40	(0)
2025–	Fenerbahçe	4	(0)
2025–2026	→ Como (loan)	27	(1)
2026–	→ Parma (loan)	3	(0)

International career
2021	Brazil Olympic (O.P.)	7	(1)
Medal record
Men's football
Representing Brazil
Olympic Games
Gold medal – first place	2020	Team
- * Club domestic league appearances and goals as of 20 September 2026

Diego Carlos Santos Silva (born 15 March 1993), known as Diego Carlos, is a Brazilian professional footballer who plays as a centre-back for Serie A club Parma, on loan from Süper Lig club Fenerbahçe.

Diego Carlos is an Olympic champion, winning gold with the Brazil football team at the 2020 Summer games.

== Club career ==
=== Early career ===
Diego Carlos began his senior career with Desportivo Brasil. In September 2012, Diego Carlos signed for São Paulo, playing for their B-Team.

He went on to sign for Paulista and Madureira for loan spells.

=== Estoril and Porto loan ===
On 2 July 2014, Diego Carlos discovered by Mário Branco and signed for Portuguese club Estoril. He spent one year with their development team before going on loan to Porto B. He went on to make 19 appearances with them in the Liga Portugal 2. After his loan move, Diego Carlos featured for Estoril in the Primeira Liga, scoring his first goal for the club on 25 October 2015. in a 2–2 draw against Rio Ave.

=== Nantes ===
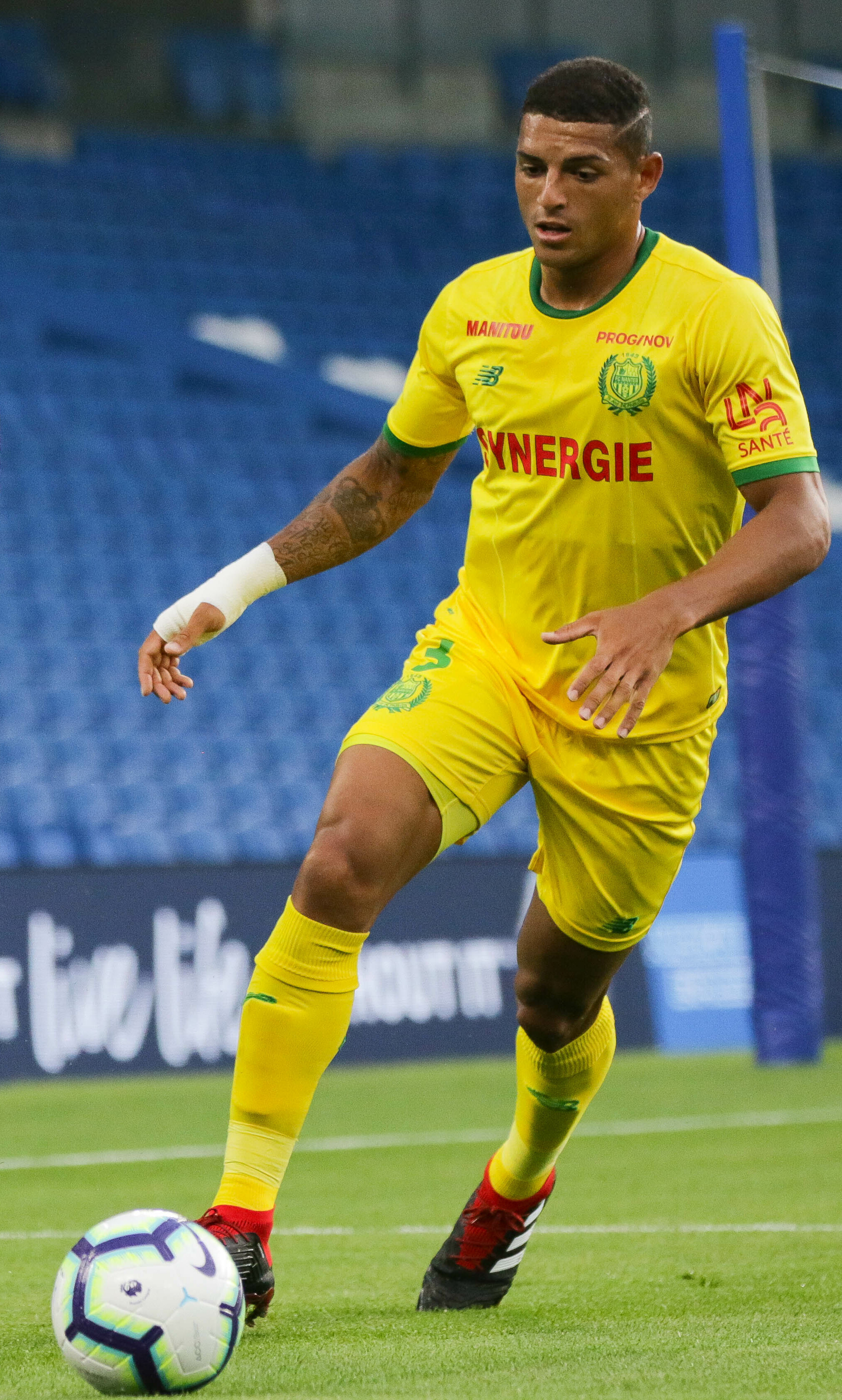
Diego Carlos with Nantes in 2018

In June 2016, it was announced Diego Carlos would join Nantes on a five-year contract. The transfer fee paid to Estoril was an estimated €2 million. He made his debut for Nantes on 25 October 2016, in a 2–1 victory over Angers in the Coupe de la Ligue. His first goal for the club came on 12 February 2017, in a 3–2 Ligue 1 victory over Marseille.

On 14 January 2018, during a Ligue 1 match between Nantes and Paris Saint-Germain, referee Tony Chapron appeared to kick Diego Carlos following a collision before sending him off for a second bookable offence. Chapron, who was suspended by the French Football Federation, admitted his mistake and asked for Diego Carlos' second yellow card to be rescinded. As a result, the French football league withdrew the second yellow card.

=== Sevilla ===
On 31 May 2019, Spanish club Sevilla announced it had reached an agreement with Nantes for the transfer of Diego Carlos. He made his debut in a 2–0 away victory over Espanyol.

Diego Carlos was part of the club's successful 2019–20 UEFA Europa League campaign. In the run-up to the final, he conceded penalties in both of Sevilla's quarter-final and semi-final matches against Wolverhampton Wanderers and Manchester United, respectively and then also gave away a penalty early on in the final itself against Inter Milan on 21 August 2020. He had a hand in the game-winning goal as his overhead kick was turned into the net by Romelu Lukaku.

In the 2021–22 season, Sevilla went on to have one of the strongest defenses in La Liga and across Europe's top leagues, with Diego Carlos' leadership at centre-back being cited as one of the reasons for this. Because of that, Diego Carlos began to attract the interest of several clubs across Europe, with English clubs Newcastle United and West Ham United reportedly attempting to sign him in the January transfer window of 2022.

=== Aston Villa ===
On 26 May 2022, English club Aston Villa announced they had reached an agreement with Sevilla for Diego Carlos' transfer. The fee was undisclosed by the club but was reported to be £26 million. Ahead of his first season with Aston Villa, he was named by manager Steven Gerrard as one of two vice-captains, alongside Emiliano Martínez. On 6 August, he made his debut for the club in the Premier League in 2–0 away loss against Bournemouth.

On 13 August 2022, Diego Carlos made his Villa Park debut in a 2–1 victory over Everton. In the same game, he ruptured his achilles tendon, which saw him requiring surgery. He did not make his return to the field until 24 March 2023, in a behind-closed-doors friendly against Bristol Rovers.

On 9 November 2023, Diego Carlos scored his first goal for Aston Villa, in a 2–1 victory over AZ in the UEFA Europa Conference League.

=== Fenerbahçe ===
On 23 January 2025, Diego Carlos signed a three-and-a-half-year deal with Turkish club Fenerbahçe for an undisclosed fee, reported to be around €10 million. Three days later, he made his Süper Lig debut with the team in a 3–2 win against Göztepe at the Şükrü Saraçoğlu Stadium, he entered the game in the 88th minute of the match.

On 5 February 2025, he suffered medial collateral ligament injury (MCL) in his right knee in the Turkish Cup match against Erzurumspor and will expected to be out for about two months. On 25 March 2025, he started to train after his MCL injury.

==== Loan to Como ====
On 1 September 2025, Diego Carlos joined Serie A club Como on loan for the remainder of the 2025–26 season. He scored his first goal for the club in a 2–1 victory over Roma on 15 March 2026.

==== Loan to Parma ====
On 1 September 2026, he joined Serie A club Parma on loan for the 2026–27 season.

== International career ==
On 3 November 2020, Diego Carlos received a late call-up to the Brazil squad for two 2022 FIFA World Cup qualifying matches against Venezuela and Uruguay.

On 17 June 2021, Diego Carlos was named to the Brazilian squad for the 2020 Summer Olympics.

== Career statistics ==
As of match played 20 September 2026

Appearances and goals by club, season and competition
Club	Season	League			National cup (Note: Includes Copa do Brasil, Taça de Portugal, Coupe de France, Copa del Rey, FA Cup, Turkish Cup, Coppa Italia)		League cup (Note: Includes Coupe de la Ligue and League Cup)		Continental		Other		Total	
Club	Season	Division	Apps	Goals	Apps	Goals	Apps	Goals	Apps	Goals	Apps	Goals	Apps	Goals
São Paulo	2013	Série A	0	0	0	0	—		0	0	0	0	0	0
Paulista (loan)	2014	—			—		—		—		1 (Note: Appearance in Campeonato Paulista)	0	1	0
Madureira (loan)	2014	Série C	2	0	—		—		—		0	0	2	0
Porto B (loan)	2014–15	Segunda Liga	19	0	—		—		—		—		19	0
Estoril	2015–16	Primeira Liga	31	2	2	0	0	0	—		—		33	2
Nantes	2016–17	Ligue 1	34	2	2	0	3	0	—		—		39	2
Nantes	2017–18	Ligue 1	28	1	1	0	0	0	—		—		29	1
Nantes	2018–19	Ligue 1	35	1	3	0	2	0	—		—		40	1
Nantes	Total		97	4	6	0	5	0	0	0	0	0	108	4
Sevilla	2019–20	La Liga	35	2	2	0	—		8 (Note: Appearance(s) in UEFA Europa League)	0	—		45	2
Sevilla	2020–21	La Liga	33	1	4	0	—		8 (Note: Appearance(s) in UEFA Champions League)	0	1 (Note: Appearance in UEFA Super Cup)	0	46	1
Sevilla	2021–22	La Liga	34	3	3	0	—		8 (Note: Six appearances in UEFA Champions League, two appearances in UEFA Europa League)	0	—		45	3
Sevilla	Total		102	6	9	0	0	0	24	0	1	0	136	6
Aston Villa	2022–23	Premier League	3	0	0	0	0	0	—		—		3	0
Aston Villa	2023–24	Premier League	27	0	2	0	0	0	9 (Note: Appearance(s) in UEFA Europa Conference League)	1	—		38	1
Aston Villa	2024–25	Premier League	10	0	0	0	1	0	6	0	—		17	0
Aston Villa	Total		40	0	2	0	1	0	15	1	0	0	58	1
Fenerbahçe	2024–25	Süper Lig	4	0	1	0	—		0	0	—		5	0
Como (loan)	2025–26	Serie A	27	1	4	0	—		—		—		31	1
Parma (loan)	2026–27	Serie A	3	0	0	0	—		—		—		3	0
Career total			325	13	24	0	6	0	39	1	2	0	396	14

== Honours ==
Sevilla

- UEFA Europa League: 2019–20

Brazil Olympic

- Summer Olympics: 2020
