= Hrvatin Gudelj =

Croatian footballer (born 1978)

Personal information
- Date of birth: 21 November 1978 (age 47)
- Place of birth: Imotski, Croatia
- Height: 1.78 m (5 ft 10 in)
- Position: Forward

Senior career*
| Years | Team | Apps | (Gls) |
| –1999 | Imotski | | |
| 1999–2001 | Borussia Dortmund II | 41 | (6) |
| 2001–2003 | Hajduk Split | 12 | (2) |
| 2003–2005 | Zadar | 40 | (14) |
| 2005–2006 | Šibenik | | |
| 2006 | Val Kaštel Stari | | |
| 2007 | Imotski | | |
| 2007–2008 | Atlantas | 19 | (6) |
| 2008–2012 | Imotski | | |
| 2012–2018 | Kamen Ivanbegovina | | |
- * Club domestic league appearances and goals

Hrvatin Gudelj (born 21 November 1978) is a Croatian retired footballer.
