= Antonio Zarzana =

Spanish footballer

Personal information
- Full name: Antonio Zarzana Pérez
- Date of birth: 21 March 2002 (age 24)
- Place of birth: Jerez de la Frontera, Spain
- Height: 1.77 m (5 ft 10 in)
- Position: Winger

Team information
- Current team: Antequera

Youth career
- 2010–2020: Sevilla

Senior career*
Years	Team	Apps	(Gls)
2018–2024	Sevilla B	42	(2)
2020–2024	Sevilla	0	(0)
2022	→ Maritimo (loan)	7	(0)
2023	→ Numancia (loan)	10	(0)
2024–2025	Ibiza	27	(1)
2025–2026	Volos	5	(0)
2026	Olympiacos B	9	(0)
2026–	Antequera	0	(0)

International career^{‡}
2018	Spain U16	3	(1)
2018	Spain U17	3	(0)
2019	Spain U18	3	(1)
- * Club domestic league appearances and goals as of 21 March 2026 ‡ National team caps and goals as of 12 January 2020

Antonio Zarzana Pérez (born 21 March 2002) is a Spanish professional footballer who plays for Primera Federación club Antequera. Mainly a winger, he can also appear as an attacking midfielder.

== Career ==
Born in Jerez de la Frontera, Cádiz, Andalusia, Zarzana joined Sevilla FC aged eight, after being spotted at a tournament in Portugal. On 27 May 2018, at the age of just 16 years and 2 months, he made his professional debut with the reserves by replacing José Lara in the 87th minute of a 2–1 home win against CD Numancia in the Segunda División championship.

Zarzana subsequently returned to the youth squads before being definitely promoted to the B-side by manager Paco Gallardo in 2020. He made his first team debut on 15 December of that year, replacing Oussama Idrissi late into a 3–0 away win over CD Ciudad de Lucena, for the season's Copa del Rey.

On 26 February 2021, Zarzana renewed his contract with the Nervionenses until 2024.

On 10 August 2022, Zarzana signed for Portuguese club Marítimo on loan. On 13 January 2023, he moved on a new loan to Numancia.

On 23 July 2024, Zarzana joined Ibiza.
