= 2006–07 Sevilla FC season =

98th season in existence of Sevilla FC

Sevilla FC
2006–07 season
- Chairman: José María del Nido
- Manager: Juande Ramos
- Primera División: 3rd
- Copa del Rey: Winners (4th title)
- UEFA Cup: Winners (2nd title)
- UEFA Super Cup: Winners (1st title)
- Top goalscorer: League: Frédéric Kanouté (21); All: Frédéric Kanouté (30)
Home colours	Away colours	Third colours

The 2006–07 season was Sevilla Fútbol Club's sixth consecutive season in La Liga. The team manager in the previous season, Juande Ramos, continued with the team. That season, the team won its second consecutive UEFA Cup in a very special final match against another Spanish team (Espanyol) and was the leader of La Liga for first time since the 1945–46 season, when the team won its only league championship. Sevilla also won its fourth Copa del Rey against Getafe.

== Kits ==
The club released a total of 7 kits, on which 3 were used for the domestic competitions, a 4th kit used for the UEFA Cup and 3 kits for specific matches.
Supplier: (Spain) Joma
Sponsor(s): (Gibraltar) 888.com, (Spain) Andalucía (sleeves and back; only for domestic matches)

Home	Away	Third	UEFA Super Cup	UEFA Cup	UEFA Cup Final	Copa del Rey Final

== Trophies balance ==
Category	Trophy	Started round	First match	Result	Last match
Friendly Trophy	2006 Trofeo Colombino	Semifinals	9 August 2006	Third place	10 August 2006
Competitive	UEFA Super Cup	Final	25 August 2006	Winners	25 August 2006
Competitive	Primera División	—	29 August 2006	3rd	17 June 2007
Competitive	Copa del Rey	Round of 32	24 October 2006	Winners	23 June 2007
Competitive	UEFA Cup	Third Qualifying Round	14 September 2006	Winners	16 May 2007

=== Competitive balance ===
Biggest win
	Home				Away			
Primera División	29 August 2006	Matchday 1	v. Levante	4 – 0	10 September 2006	Matchday 2	v. Real Sociedad	1 – 3
Primera División	29 August 2006	Matchday 1	v. Levante	4 – 0	26 November 2006	Matchday 12	v. Athletic Bilbao	1 – 3
Primera División	20 December 2006	Matchday 16	v. Deportivo	4 – 0	17 December 2006	Matchday 15	v. Recreativo Huelva	1 – 3
Primera División	20 December 2006	Matchday 16	v. Deportivo	4 – 0	28 January 2007	Matchday 20	v. Levante	2 – 4
Copa del Rey	8 November 2006	Round of 32, 2nd leg	v. Gimnástica Segoviana	3 – 0	18 April 2007	Semifinals, 1st leg	v. Deportivo	0 – 3
UEFA Cup	28 September 2006	QR 3, 2nd leg	v. (Greece) Atromitos	4 – 0	29 November 2006	GS, Matchday 3	v. (Switzerland) Grasshoppers	0 – 4
Biggest loss
	Home				Away			
Primera División	14 January 2007	Matchday 18	v. Mallorca	1 – 2	15 October 2006	Matchday 6	v. Barcelona	3 – 1
Primera División	17 June 2007	Matchday 38	v. Villarreal	0 – 1	15 April 2007	Matchday 29	v. Valencia	2 – 0
Copa del Rey	None							
UEFA Cup	14 December 2006	GS, Matchday 4	v. (Netherlands) AZ	1 – 2	26 April 2007	Semifinals, 1st leg	v. (Spain) Osasuna	1 – 0

== Summer transfers ==
=== In ===
(substituted on) In (5 players)
Player	From	Fee
(Denmark) Christian Poulsen	(Germany) Schalke 04	Free
(Germany) Andreas Hinkel	(Germany) VfB Stuttgart	€4M
(Spain) David Cobeño	(Spain) Real Madrid Castilla	Free
(Portugal) Duda	(Spain) Málaga	Free
(Uruguay) Javier Chevantón	(France) Monaco	Free

=== Out ===
(substituted off) Out (4 players)
Player	New Team	Fee
(Spain) Jordi López	(Spain) Mallorca	€1.5M
(Spain) Antonio Notario	(Spain) Real Murcia	Free
(Spain) Carlos Aranda	(Spain) Real Murcia	Free
(Spain) Antonio López	(Spain) Castellón	Free

=== Loan out ===
(substituted off) Loan out (5 players)
Player	Team
(Spain) Antoñito Pérez	(Spain) Real Murcia
(Spain) Francisco Gallardo	(Spain) Real Murcia
(Portugal) Ariza Makukula	(Spain) Gimnàstic Tarragona
(Uruguay) Germán Hornos	(Uruguay) Bella Vista
(Spain) Pablo Ruiz	(Spain) Real Murcia

=== Loan return ===
(substituted on) Loan return (0 players)
Italics for players returning to the club but left it during pre-season
Player	From
(Spain) Antonio López	(Spain) Málaga

=== Loan end ===
(substituted off) Loan end (1 players)
Player	Returns to
(Argentina) Javier Saviola	(Spain) Barcelona

== Winter transfers ==
=== In ===
(substituted on) In (1 player)
Player	From	Fee
(Russia) Aleksandr Kerzhakov	(Russia) Zenit Saint Petersburg	€5M

=== Loan out ===
(substituted off) Loan out (2 players)
Player	Team
(Spain) Jesuli	(Spain) Real Sociedad
(Spain) Kepa	(England) West Ham United

== Squad ==
- Updated to 17 June 2007

Note: Flags indicate national team as defined under FIFA eligibility rules; some limited exceptions apply. Players may hold more than one non-FIFA nationality.

No.	Pos.	Nation	Player
1	GK	ESP	Andrés Palop
2	DF	ESP	Javier Navarro (captain)
3	DF	ESP	David Castedo
4	DF	BRA	Dani Alves
5	MF	POR	Duda
6	MF	BRA	Adriano
7	FW	URU	Javier Chevantón
8	MF	DEN	Christian Poulsen
9	FW	RUS	Aleksandr Kerzhakov
10	FW	BRA	Luís Fabiano
11	MF	BRA	Renato

No.	Pos.	Nation	Player
12	FW	MLI	Frédéric Kanouté
13	GK	ESP	David Cobeño
14	DF	FRA	Julien Escudé
15	MF	ESP	Jesús Navas
16	DF	ESP	Antonio Puerta
18	MF	ESP	José Luis Martí
19	DF	SRB	Ivica Dragutinović
20	DF	ESP	Aitor Ocio
22	MF	ESP	Fernando Sales
24	DF	GER	Andreas Hinkel
25	MF	ITA	Enzo Maresca

=== Youth system ===
Note: Flags indicate national team as defined under FIFA eligibility rules; some limited exceptions apply. Players may hold more than one non-FIFA nationality.

No.	Pos.	Nation	Player
26	MF	ESP	Bruno
27	MF	ESP	Alejandro Alfaro
28	DF	ESP	Lolo

No.	Pos.	Nation	Player
29	GK	ESP	Javi Varas
—	DF	ARG	Federico Fazio

== Match results ==
=== Pre-season ===
==== Friendly matches ====
17 July 2006	San Roque Lepe	1–5	Sevilla	Lepe (Huelva)
			Luís Fabiano; Adriano,, Kanouté	Stadium: Municipal de Lepe

21 July 2006	UD Pilas	0–4	Sevilla	Pilas (Sevilla)
21:30 CEST			Kepa; Makukula; Jesuli; Puerta

25 July 2006	Marbella	0–4	Sevilla	Marbella (Málaga)
21:00 CEST			Bruno, Navas; Poulsen	Stadium: Municipal de Marbella

28 July 2006	Chiclana	0–6	Sevilla	Chiclana de la Frontera (Cádiz)
			, Kanouté, Navas; Makukula; Kepa	Stadium: Municipal de Chiclana

30 July 2006	Beitar Jerusalem	Called off	Sevilla	Jerusalem
				Stadium: Teddy

4 August 2006	Albirex Niigata	0–6	Sevilla	Niigata
		Report	5', 27' Kepa; 43' Kanouté; 79' Bruno; 86' Alfaro; 87' Makukula	Stadium: Niigata Stadium Big Swan; Attendance: 12,554

6 August 2006	Júbilo Iwata	2–3	Sevilla	Iwata
		Report	, Makukula; Adriano	Stadium: Yamaha; Attendance: 4,084

12 August 2006	Manchester United	3–0	Sevilla	Manchester
15:00 CEST; 14:00 Local time				Stadium: Old Trafford

15 August 2006	Sevilla	5–1	New Zealand	Sevilla
20:45 CEST	Chevantón,, Luís Fabiano; Alves			Stadium: Ramón Sánchez Pizjuán

18 August 2006	Las Palmas	0–0	Sevilla	Las Palmas de Gran Canaria
				Stadium: Gran Canaria

19 September 2006	Wisła Kraków	1–0	Sevilla	Kraków
				Stadium: Miejski im. Henryka Reymana

==== 2006 Trofeo Colombino ====
Semi-finals
8 August – Huelva
Recreativo Huelva	3
Bolton Wanderers	2
9 August – Huelva
Sevilla	2
Sporting CP	4

Final
10 August – Huelva
Recreativo Huelva	0
Sporting CP	3
Third place
10 August – Huelva
Bolton Wanderers	0
Sevilla	3

9 August 2006 Semifinal	Sevilla	2–4	Sporting CP	Huelva
22:00 CEST	Kanouté,			Stadium: Nuevo Colombino

10 August 2006 3rd / 4th Place Play-off	Bolton Wanderers	0–3	Sevilla	Huelva
19:30 CEST			,, Luís Fabiano	Stadium: Nuevo Colombino

=== UEFA Super Cup ===
==== Final ====
25 August 2006
20:45 CEST

Barcelona (Spain)	0–3	Sevilla
	(Report)	7' Renato; 45' Kanouté; 89' (pen.) Maresca

Stade Louis II, Monaco
Attendance: 17,480
Referee: (Italy) Stefano Farina

Barcelona	Sevilla

BARCELONA
GK	1	(Spain) Víctor Valdés
RB	2	(Brazil) Juliano Belletti
CB	4	(Mexico) Rafael Márquez
CB	5	(Spain) Carles Puyol (c)
LB	16	(Brazil) Sylvinho	(yellow card) 47'	(substituted off) 72'
DM	6	(Spain) Xavi		(substituted off) 57'
CM	3	(Brazil) Thiago Motta		(substituted off) 57'
CM	20	(Portugal) Deco
RW	19	(Argentina) Lionel Messi
LW	10	(Brazil) Ronaldinho
CF	9	(Cameroon) Samuel Eto'o
Substitutes:
GK	25	(Spain) Albert Jorquera
DF	11	(Italy) Gianluca Zambrotta
DF	21	(France) Lilian Thuram
DF	23	(Spain) Oleguer
MF	8	(France) Ludovic Giuly		(substituted on) 72'
MF	24	(Spain) Andrés Iniesta		(substituted on) 57'
FW	7	(Iceland) Eiður Guðjohnsen		(substituted on) 57'
Manager:
(Netherlands) Frank Rijkaard

SEVILLA
GK	1	(Spain) Andrés Palop	(yellow card) 77'
RB	4	(Brazil) Dani Alves	(yellow card) 54'
CB	2	(Spain) Javi Navarro (c)	(yellow card) 60'
CB	14	(France) Julien Escudé	(yellow card) 85'
LB	3	(Spain) David Castedo
RM	15	(Spain) Jesús Navas		(substituted off) 75'
CM	8	(Denmark) Christian Poulsen
CM	11	(Brazil) Renato
LM	6	(Brazil) Adriano		(substituted off) 81'
CF	10	(Brazil) Luís Fabiano		(substituted off) 46'
CF	12	(Mali) Frédéric Kanouté	(yellow card) 49'
Substitutes:
GK	13	(Spain) David Cobeño
DF	19	(Serbia) Ivica Dragutinović
DF	24	(Germany) Andreas Hinkel
MF	16	(Spain) Antonio Puerta		(substituted on) 81'
MF	18	(Spain) José Luis Martí		(substituted on) 46'
MF	25	(Italy) Enzo Maresca	(yellow card) 90'	(substituted on) 75'
FW	7	(Uruguay) Javier Chevantón
Manager:
(Spain) Juande Ramos

Man of the Match:
(Brazil) Dani Alves

Assistant referees:
(Italy) Marco Ivaldi
(Italy) Alessandro Griselli
Fourth official:
(Italy) Matteo Trefoloni

UEFA Super Cup
2006 Winners
Sevilla
1st Title

=== Primera División ===
Matchday	1	2	3	4	5	6	7	8	9	10	11	12	13	14	15	16	17	18	19	20	21	22	23	24	25	26	27	28	29	30	31	32	33	34	35	36	37	38
Result against	LEV	RSO	BET	ATM	GET	FCB	NÀS	CEL	OSA	RAC	VAL	ATH	ESP	RMA	RHU	DEP	ZAR	MLL	VIL	LEV	RSO	BET	ATM	GET	FCB	NÀS	CEL	OSA	RAC	VAL	ATH	ESP	RMA	RHU	DEP	ZAR	MLL	VIL
Venue	H	A	H	A	H	A	H	A	H	A	H	A	A	H	A	H	A	H	A	A	H	A	H	A	H	A	H	A	H	A	H	H	A	H	A	H	A	H
Position	1	1	1	5	3	4	3	2	1	2	2	2	3	2	1	1	1	1	2	2	2	2	2	2	1	2	2	2	2	2	2	2	3	3	3	3	3	3
Goal Average (useful in case of tie)																				Won	Won	Won	Won	Won	Lost	Lost	Won	Won	Drawn	Won	Won	Won	Won	Won	Won	Won	Lost	Lost

Win Draw Lost

		All							Home							Away						
		Pts	W	D	L	F	A	Dif.	Pts	W	D	L	F	A	Dif.	Pts	W	D	L	F	A	Dif.
3	Sevilla	71	21	8	9	64	35	+29	47	15	2	2	41	13	+28	24	6	6	7	23	22	+1

La Liga Winner (also qualified for 2007–08 UEFA Champions League Group Stage)
2007–08 UEFA Champions League Group Stage
2007–08 UEFA Champions League 3rd Qualifying Round
2007–08 UEFA Cup 3rd Qualifying Round
2007 UEFA Intertoto Cup Final
Relegation to Liga BBVA

29 August 2006	Sevilla	4–0	Levante	Seville
21:00 CEST	Kanouté 7'; Kepa 27', 51', 87', (yellow card) 61'; Navarro (yellow card) 47'	(Report)	(yellow card) 3' Gaspar; (yellow card) 32' Camacho; (yellow card) 36' (yellow-red card) 77' Courtois; (yellow card) 81' Ettien	Stadium: Ramón Sánchez Pizjuán; Referee: (Basque Country (autonomous community)) Carlos Delgado Ferreiro

10 September 2006	Real Sociedad	1–3	Sevilla	San Sebastián
19:00 CEST	Juanito (yellow card) 27'; Cifuentes (yellow card) 34'; López Rekarte (yellow card) 54'; Kovačević (yellow card) 82'; Díaz de Cerio 90+'	(Report)	6' Renato; (yellow card) 16' Alves; (yellow card) 43' Castedo; (yellow card) 55' Martí; 74' Kanouté; 90+' Dragutinović	Stadium: Anoeta; Referee: (Cantabria) Fernando Teixeira Vitienes

17 September 2006	Sevilla	3–2	Real Betis	Seville
19:00 CEST	Kanouté 25', 58'; Escudé (yellow card) 43'; Renato 86'; Alves (yellow card) 86'	(Report)	(yellow card) 15' Romero; 41', 53' Sóbis; (yellow card) 72' Nano; (yellow card) 80' Doblas	Stadium: Ramón Sánchez Pizjuán; Referee: (Asturias) Manuel Enrique Mejuto González

24 September 2006	Atlético Madrid	2–1	Sevilla	Madrid
19:00 CEST	Perea (yellow card) 21'; Torres (yellow card) 25'; López (yellow card) 30'; Rodríguez (yellow card) 36', (goal) 84', 87'; Maniche (yellow card) 70'; Franco (yellow card) 88'	(Report)	(yellow card) 25' Poulsen; (yellow card) 27' (yellow-red card) 47' Escudé; 40' Renato; (yellow card) 43' Puerta; (yellow card) 44' (yellow-red card) 65' Navarro; (yellow card) 44' Alves	Stadium: Vicente Calderón; Referee: (Galicia (Spain)) Bernardino González Vázquez

1 October 2006	Sevilla	1–0	Getafe	Seville
18:00 CEST	Dragutinović (yellow card) 27'; Luís Fabiano 30'	(Report)	(yellow card) 21' Licht; (yellow card) 55' Paredes	Stadium: Ramón Sánchez Pizjuán; Referee: (Valencian Community) Miguel Ángel Ayza Gámez

15 October 2006	Barcelona	3–1	Sevilla	Barcelona
19:00 CEST	Ronaldinho 27' (pen.), 38'; Motta (yellow card) 71'; Messi 80'	(Report)	(yellow card) 26' Luís Fabiano; (yellow card) 27' Renato; (yellow card) 30' Puerta; 37', (yellow card) 80' Kanouté; (yellow card) 70' Palop; (yellow card) 89' Alves	Stadium: Camp Nou; Referee: (Asturias) César Muñiz Fernández

22 October 2006	Sevilla	2–1	Gimnàstic Tarragona	Seville
17:00 CEST	Alves (yellow card) 7'; Kanouté 21', 27'; Navarro (yellow card) 64'; Poulsen (yellow card) 68'	(Report)	(yellow card) 8' Pinilla; (yellow card) 44' Gil; (yellow card) 50' Bizzarri; 67' Cuéllar; (yellow card) 77' Llera; (yellow card) 90+1' Morales	Stadium: Ramón Sánchez Pizjuán; Referee: (Castile and León) Javier Turienzo Álvarez

29 October 2006	Celta Vigo	1–2	Sevilla	Vigo
17:00 CET	Nenê 6'; García (yellow card) 71'; Canobbio (yellow card) 78'; Iriney (yellow card) 83'	(Report)	30' Poulsen; (yellow card) 57' Martí; 78' Adriano; (yellow card) 85' Puerta	Stadium: Balaídos; Referee: (Catalonia) Alfonso Javier Álvarez Izquierdo

5 November 2006	Sevilla	2–0	Osasuna	Seville
17:00 CET	Kanouté 50' (pen.), (yellow card) 54'; Poulsen (yellow card) 51'; Navarro (yellow card) 53'	(Report)	(yellow card) 18' Puñal; (yellow card) 25' Corrales; (yellow card) 56' Flaño; (yellow card) 60' Cuéllar; (yellow card) 63' Soldado; (yellow card) 64' Valdo; (yellow card) 73' García; (yellow card) 82' Delporte	Stadium: Ramón Sánchez Pizjuán; Referee: (Community of Madrid) Carlos Velasco Carballo

12 November 2006	Racing Santander	0–0	Sevilla	Santander
17:00 CET	Serrano (yellow card) 38'	(Report)	(yellow card) 44' Martí; (yellow card) 49' Alves; (yellow card) 64' Escudé; (yellow card) 78' Dragutinović	Stadium: El Sardinero; Referee: (Aragon) Arturo Daudén Ibáñez

18 November 2006	Sevilla	3–0	Valencia	Seville
22:00 CET	Ocio 18'; Poulsen (yellow card) 26'; Puerta (yellow card) 44'; Luís Fabiano 55'; Kanouté 70'	(Report)	(yellow card) 4' (red card) 16' Silva; (yellow card) 13' Cerrajería	Stadium: Ramón Sánchez Pizjuán; Referee: (Community of Madrid) Carlos Mejía Dávila

26 November 2006	Athletic Bilbao	1–3	Sevilla	Bilbao
21:00 CET	Amorebieta (yellow card) 13'; Martínez (yellow card) 43'; Aduriz 67'; Yeste (yellow card) 83'	(Report)	4', 89' Luís Fabiano; 10', (yellow card) 15' Martí; (yellow card) 71' Dragutinović; (yellow card) 83' Poulsen	Stadium: San Mamés; Referee: (Valencian Community) Miguel Ángel Ayza Gámez

3 December 2006	Espanyol	2–1	Sevilla	Barcelona
17:00 CET	García (yellow card) 24', (goal) 79'; Tamudo (yellow card) 41', (goal) 68'; Chica (yellow card) 47'; Zabaleta (yellow card) 71'; Riera (red card) 84'	(Report)	25' Kanouté; (yellow card) 33' Navarro; (yellow card) 73' Adriano	Stadium: Lluís Companys; Referee: (Cantabria) Alfonso Pérez Burrull

9 December 2006	Sevilla	2–1	Real Madrid	Seville
22:00 CET	Kanouté 17'; Navarro (yellow card) 33'; Luís Fabiano (yellow card) 40'; Chevantón 76', (yellow card) 76'	(Report)	12', (yellow card) 64' Beckham; (yellow card) 42' Salgado; (yellow card) 89' Cannavaro	Stadium: Ramón Sánchez Pizjuán; Referee: (Asturias) César Muñiz Fernández

17 December 2006	Recreativo Huelva	1–3	Sevilla	Huelva
17:00 CET	Merino (yellow card) 9'; Vázquez 18'; Viqueira (yellow card) 39'	(Report)	10' (pen.), (yellow card) 23' Luís Fabiano; (yellow card) 26' (yellow-red card) 65' Ocio; 35' Kanouté; 53' Navas; (yellow card) 59' Martí; (yellow card) 68' Palop; (yellow card) 90+1' Puerta	Stadium: Nuevo Colombino; Referee: (Asturias) Manuel Enrique Mejuto González

20 December 2006	Sevilla	4–0	Deportivo	Seville
21:00 CET	Kanouté 28', 63' (pen.); Luís Fabiano 66'; Alves 73'; Escudé (yellow card) 89'	(Report)	(yellow card) 32' Sergio; (yellow card) 44' Rodríguez; (yellow card) 54' Capdevila; (yellow card) 63' Andrade	Stadium: Ramón Sánchez Pizjuán; Referee: (Valencian Community) Vicente José Lizondo Cortés

6 January 2007	Real Zaragoza	2–1	Sevilla	Zaragoza
22:00 CET	Diogo 13'; Zapater (yellow card) 44'; Milito 51'; Aimar (yellow card) 66'	(Report)	(yellow card) 14', (goal) 70' Luís Fabiano; (yellow card) 30' Alves; (yellow card) 38' Navas; (yellow card) 84' Chevantón	Stadium: La Romareda; Referee: (Navarre) Alberto Undiano Mallenco

14 January 2007	Sevilla	1–2	Mallorca	Seville
17:00 CET	Kanouté 21'; Martí (yellow card) 71'	(Report)	(yellow card) 23', (goal) 48' Nunes; (yellow card) 30' Héctor; 61' M. López; (yellow card) 85' Ballesteros	Stadium: Ramón Sánchez Pizjuán; Referee: (Castile and León) Julián Rodríguez Santiago

20 January 2007	Villarreal	0–0	Sevilla	Villarreal
22:00 CET	Josemi (yellow card) 25'; Josico (yellow card) 82'; Marquitos (yellow card) 86'; Álvarez (yellow card) 88'	(Report)	(yellow card) 25' Poulsen; (yellow card) 54' Alves; (yellow card) 66' Navarro; (yellow card) 79' Escudé; (yellow card) 85' Maresca	Stadium: El Madrigal; Referee: (Basque Country (autonomous community)) Eduardo Iturralde González

28 January 2007	Levante	2–4	Sevilla	Valencia
17:00 CET	Tommasi (yellow card) 30'; Déhu 68'; Reggi (yellow card) 71', (goal) 73'	(Report)	34' Kanouté; 55' Kerzhakov; 65' (o.g.) Tommasi; (yellow card) 69' Martí; (yellow card) 71' Navarro; 76' Alfaro; (yellow card) 81' Alves	Stadium: Ciutat de València; Referee: (Castilla–La Mancha) Alfonso Pino Zamorano

4 February 2007	Sevilla	0–0	Real Sociedad	Seville
17:00 CET	Escudé (yellow card) 11'; Duda (yellow card) 88' (yellow-red card) 90+1'	(Report)	(yellow card) 14' Rivas; (yellow card) 56' Garrido; (yellow card) 59' Garitano; (yellow card) 65' Gerardo; (yellow card) 72' Uranga; (yellow card) 84' Prieto	Stadium: Ramón Sánchez Pizjuán; Referee: (Aragon) Carlos Clos Gómez

10 February 2007	Real Betis	0–0	Sevilla	Seville
22:00 CET	Robert (yellow card) 38'	(Report)	(yellow card) 10' Alves; (yellow card) 30' Poulsen	Stadium: Manuel Ruiz de Lopera; Referee: (Community of Madrid) Carlos Mejía Dávila

18 February 2007	Sevilla	3–1	Atlético Madrid	Seville
21:00 CET	Kanouté 14', 73'; Alves 21', (yellow card) 88'; Ocio (yellow card) 33'; Martí (red card) 35'; Poulsen (yellow card) 79'	(Report)	(yellow card) 28' Pernía; (yellow card) 39' Luccin; (yellow card) 56' Costinha; 82' Ibáñez; (yellow card) 84' Gabi	Stadium: Ramón Sánchez Pizjuán; Referee: (Cantabria) Fernando Teixeira Vitienes

25 February 2007	Getafe	0–0	Sevilla	Getafe
17:00 CET	Contra (yellow card) 12'; Belenguer (yellow card) 16'; Celestini (yellow card) 34'; Güiza (yellow card) 38'	(Report)	(yellow card) 32' Duda; (yellow card) 39' Luís Fabiano	Stadium: El Coliséum; Referee: (Basque Country (autonomous community)) Miguel Ángel Pérez Lasa

3 March 2007	Sevilla	2–1	Barcelona	Seville
22:00 CET	Ocio (red card) 27'; Kerzhakov 38'; Alves 60', (yellow card) 61'; Alfaro (yellow card) 78'	(Report)	13' Ronaldinho; (yellow card) 42' Márquez; (red card) 61' Giuly; (yellow card) 75' (yellow-red card) 76' Zambrotta; (yellow card) 76' Eto'o	Stadium: Ramón Sánchez Pizjuán; Referee: (Galicia (Spain)) Bernardino González Vázquez

11 March 2007	Gimnàstic Tarragona	1–0	Sevilla	Tarragona
17:00 CET	Morales (yellow card) 36'; Portillo 75'; Bizzarri (yellow card) 88'	(Report)	(yellow card) 59' Puerta; (yellow card) 79' Chevantón; (yellow card) 81' Martí	Stadium: Nou Estadi; Referee: (Community of Madrid) Carlos Velasco Carballo

18 March 2007	Sevilla	2–0	Celta Vigo	Seville
21:00 CET	Kanouté 51'; Kerzhakov 90+1'	(Report)	(yellow card) 64' Gustavo; (yellow card) 69' Aspas; (yellow card) 71' Placente; (red card) 73' Canobbio	Stadium: Ramón Sánchez Pizjuán; Referee: (Community of Madrid) Antonio Rubinos Pérez

1 April 2007	Osasuna	0–0	Sevilla	Pamplona
21:00 CEST	Webó (yellow card) 64'; Flaño (yellow card) 67'; Font (yellow card) 73'; Milošević (yellow card) 87'; Juanfran (yellow card) 88'	(Report)	(yellow card) 44' Maresca; (yellow card) 77' Castedo	Stadium: Reyno de Navarra; Referee: (Basque Country (autonomous community)) Carlos Delgado Ferreiro

8 April 2007	Sevilla	0–0	Racing Santander	Sevilla
17:00 CEST	Chevantón (yellow card) 19'; Alves (yellow card) 89'	(Report)	(yellow card) 57' Oriol	Stadium: Ramón Sánchez Pizjuán; Referee: (Community of Madrid) Carlos Mejía Dávila

15 April 2007	Valencia	2–0	Sevilla	Valencia
21:00 CEST	Villa 26', 49' (pen.); Marchena (yellow card) 61'	(Report)	(yellow card) 44' Navarro; (red card) 49' Hinkel	Stadium: Mestalla; Referee: (Aragon) Carlos Clos Gómez

22 April 2007	Sevilla	4–1	Athletic Bilbao	Seville
19:00 CEST	Kerzhakov 49'; Puerta 54'; Chevantón 66'; Luís Fabiano 79', (yellow card) 79'	(Report)	(yellow card) 41' Sarriegui; (yellow card) 44' Iraola; (yellow card) 51' Amorebieta; 74' Yeste; (yellow card) 90+1' Prieto	Stadium: Ramón Sánchez Pizjuán; Referee: (Valencian Community) Miguel Ángel Ayza Gámez

29 April 2007	Sevilla	3–1	Espanyol	Seville
17:00 CEST	Alves (yellow card) 14'; Puerta 51'; Chevantón 53'; Martí 73'	(Report)	(yellow card) 12' Rufete; (yellow card) 19' Ito; (yellow card) 78' Zabaleta	Stadium: Ramón Sánchez Pizjuán; Referee: (Community of Madrid) Carlos Velasco Carballo

6 May 2007	Real Madrid	3–2	Sevilla	Madrid
21:00 CEST	Torres (yellow card) 39'; Ramos (yellow card) 54'; Van Nistelrooy 62', 85'; Robinho (yellow card) 71' (yellow-red card) 78', (goal) 77'; Beckham (yellow card) 85'; Casillas (yellow card) 86'	(Report)	40' Maresca; (yellow card) 66' Hinkel; (red card) 73' Luís Fabiano; (red card) 82' Ocio; (yellow card) 85', (goal) 88' Chevantón	Stadium: Santiago Bernabéu; Referee: (Cantabria) Alfonso Pérez Burrull

12 May 2007	Sevilla	2–1	Recreativo Huelva	Seville
22:00 CEST	Maresca 12'; Puerta (yellow card) 61'; Kerzhakov (yellow card) 65'; Luís Fabiano 81' (pen.), (yellow card) 90+1'; Dragutinović (yellow card) 82'; Martí (yellow card) 90+2'	(Report)	(yellow card) 29' Amo; (yellow card) 57' Sinama Pongolle; 88' (pen.) Vázquez	Stadium: Ramón Sánchez Pizjuán; Referee: (Catalonia) Alfonso Javier Álvarez Izquierdo

20 May 2007	Deportivo	1–2	Sevilla	A Coruña
17:00 CEST	Andrade (yellow card) 38'; Bodipo 72', (yellow card) 72'; Rodríguez (yellow card) 76'; Coloccini (yellow card) 90+1'	(Report)	(yellow card) 38' Alves; (yellow card) 39' Navarro; 75' Renato; 83' Kanouté; (yellow card) 88' Luís Fabiano	Stadium: Riazor; Referee: (Cantabria) Fernando Teixeira Vitienes

27 May 2007	Sevilla	3–1	Real Zaragoza	Seville
21:00 CEST	Adriano (yellow card) 15'; Luís Fabiano 26'; Poulsen (yellow card) 77'; Kerzhakov 82', (yellow card) 83'; Kanouté 90+1'	(Report)	(yellow card) 44' Milito; (yellow card) 50' Movilla; (yellow card) 70' Sergio; 73' D'Alessandro; (yellow card) 89' (yellow-red card) 90+1' Diogo	Stadium: Ramón Sánchez Pizjuán; Referee: (Asturias) Manuel Enrique Mejuto González

9 June 2007	Mallorca	0–0	Sevilla	Palma
21:00 CEST	Ibagaza (yellow card) 41'; Héctor (yellow card) 51'	(Report)	(yellow card) 23' Navarro; (yellow card) 30' (yellow-red card) 72' Dragutinović; (yellow card) 44' Palop; (yellow card) 56' Alves; (yellow card) 71' Luís Fabiano	Stadium: ONO Estadi; Referee: (Basque Country (autonomous community)) Eduardo Iturralde González

17 June 2007	Sevilla	0–1	Villarreal	Seville
21:00 CEST	Poulsen (yellow card) 72'; Chevantón (yellow card) 76'; Ocio (yellow card) 76'	(Report)	50', (yellow card) 77' Fuentes; (yellow card) 60' Franco; (yellow card) 72' Venta	Stadium: Ramón Sánchez Pizjuán; Referee: (Cantabria) Alfonso Pérez Burrull

=== UEFA Cup ===
==== Third Qualifying Round ====
14 September 2006 First leg	Atromitos (Greece)	1–2	Sevilla	Athens
21:00 CEST	Geladaris (yellow card) 16'; Oliveira (yellow card) 57'; Korakakis 64'; Doe (yellow card) 70'	(Report)	14' Kepa; 42' Duda	Stadium: Georgios Kamaras; Attendance: 2,500; Referee: (Austria) Stefan Messner

28 September 2006 Second leg	Sevilla	4–0	(Greece) Atromitos	Seville
21:30 CEST	Rocha 1' (o.g.); Ioannou 10' (o.g.); Luís Fabiano 29'; Kepa 86'	(Report)	(yellow card) 36' Raguel; (yellow card) 78' Rocha	Stadium: Ramón Sánchez Pizjuán; Attendance: 35,000; Referee: (Slovakia) Vladimír Hriňák

Sevilla won 6–1 on aggregate

==== Group stage ====
Team	Pld	W	D	L	GF	GA	GD	Pts
(Netherlands) AZ	4	3	1	0	11	5	+6	10
(Spain) Sevilla	4	2	1	1	7	1	+6	7
(Portugal) Braga	4	2	0	2	6	5	+1	6
(Czech Republic) Slovan Liberec	4	1	2	1	6	7	−1	5
(Switzerland) Grasshoppers	4	0	0	4	3	15	−12	0

19 October 2006 Matchday 1	Slovan Liberec (Czech Republic)	0–0	Sevilla	Liberec
21:00 CEST	Pospěch (yellow card) 28'; Holenda (yellow card) 53'; Pudil (yellow card) 58'	(Report)	(yellow card) 61' Luís Fabiano	Stadium: U Nisy; Attendance: 7,023; Referee: (Romania) Alexandru Tudor

23 November 2006 Matchday 2	Sevilla	2–0	(Portugal) Braga	Seville
20:45 CET	Luís Fabiano 40'; Chevantón 76'; Palop (yellow card) 87'	(Report)	(yellow card) 71' Luís Filipe; (yellow card) 73' Césinha	Stadium: Ramón Sánchez Pizjuán; Attendance: 37,000; Referee: (Germany) Helmunt Fleischer

29 November 2006 Matchday 3	Grasshoppers (Switzerland)	0–4	Sevilla	Zürich
20:45 CET		(Report)	12', 53' Alves; 62' Chevantón; 84' Kepa; (yellow card) 84' Palop	Stadium: Hardturm; Attendance: 7,300; Referee: (Bulgaria) Anton Genov

14 December 2006 Matchday 4	Sevilla	1–2	(Netherlands) AZ	Seville
20:45 CET	Chevantón 52' (pen.); Martí (yellow card) 83'; Renato (yellow card) 87'	(Report)	(yellow card) 35' De Cler; (yellow card) 54' Opdam; 62', 90+3' Shota	Stadium: Ramón Sánchez Pizjuán; Attendance: 33,500; Referee: (Norway) Tommy Skjerven

==== Round of 32 ====
15 February 2007 First leg	Steaua București (Romania)	0–2	Sevilla	Bucharest
19:30 CET	Ghionea (yellow card) 12'; Marin (yellow card) 72'; Théréau (yellow card) 80'	(Report)	(yellow card) 6' Puerta; 41' Poulsen; 77' (pen.) Kanouté; (yellow card) 81' Ocio	Stadium: Stadionul Steaua; Attendance: 30,000; Referee: (Germany) Florian Meyer

22 February 2007 Second leg	Sevilla	1–0	(Romania) Steaua București	Seville
20:45 CET	Kerzhakov (yellow card) 41', (goal) 45+3'; Dragutinović (yellow card) 77'	(Report)	(yellow card) 23' Nicoliță; (yellow card) 66' Croitoru; (yellow card) 70' Paraschiv; (yellow card) 87' Badea	Stadium: Ramón Sánchez Pizjuán; Attendance: 20,000; Referee: (Scotland) Stuart Dougal

Sevilla won 3–0 on aggregate

==== Round of 16 ====
8 March 2007 First leg	Sevilla	2–2	(Ukraine) Shakhtar Donetsk	Seville
20:45 CET	Martí 8' (pen.), (yellow card) 36'; Navas (yellow card) 17'; Luís Fabiano (yellow card) 69'; Maresca 88' (pen.)	(Report)	19' Hübschman; (yellow card) 21' Duljaj; (yellow card) 40' Brandão; (yellow card) 51', (goal) 60' (pen.) Matuzalém; (yellow card) 51' Elano	Stadium: Ramón Sánchez Pizjuán; Attendance: 35,000; Referee: (Hungary) Viktor Kassai

15 March 2007 Second leg	Shakhtar Donetsk (Ukraine)	2–3 (a.e.t.)	Sevilla	Donetsk
19:30 CET	Byelik (yellow card) 20'; Matuzalém 49'; Elano 83'; Lewandowski (yellow card) 89'	(Report); Live TV:	(yellow card) 36' Navarro; (yellow card) 42' Luís Fabiano; 53' Maresca; (yellow card) 90+2' Dragutinović; 90+5' Palop; (yellow card) 98' Poulsen; 105' Chevantón; (yellow card) 115' Escudé	Stadium: RSK Olympyiskyi; Attendance: 30,000; Referee: (Italy) Gianluca Paparesta

Sevilla FC won 5–4 on aggregate

==== Quarter-finals ====
5 April 2007 First leg	Sevilla	2–1	(England) Tottenham Hotspur	Seville
20:45 CEST	Kanouté 19' (pen.); Castedo (yellow card) 31'; Kerzhakov 36'	(Report)	2' Keane; (yellow card) 19' Robinson; (yellow card) 34' Tainio; (yellow card) 45' Lee; (yellow card) 53' Zokora	Stadium: Ramón Sánchez Pizjuán; Attendance: 32,000; Referee: (Luxembourg) Alain Hamer

12 April 2007 Second leg	Tottenham Hotspur (England)	2–2	Sevilla	London
20:45 CEST; 19:45 Local time	Dawson (yellow card) 32'; Malbranque (yellow card) 35'; Defoe 65', (yellow card) 90'; Lennon 67'; Tainio (red card) 90'	(Report)	3' (o.g.) Malbranque; 8' Kanouté	Stadium: White Hart Lane; Attendance: 27,314; Referee: (Austria) Konrad Plautz

Sevilla won 4–3 on aggregate

==== Semi-finals ====
26 April 2007 First leg	Osasuna (Spain)	1–0	Sevilla	Pamplona
20:45 CEST	Milošević (yellow card) 15'; Soldado (yellow card) 54', (goal) 55'; Cuéllar (yellow card) 58'	(Report)	(yellow card) 38' Poulsen; (yellow card) 41' Kanouté; (yellow card) 58' Luís Fabiano	Stadium: Reyno de Navarra; Attendance: 19,500; Referee: (Netherlands) Eric Braamhaar

3 May 2007 Second leg	Sevilla	2–0	(Spain) Osasuna	Seville
20:45 CEST	Luís Fabiano 37'; Renato 53'; Duda (yellow card) 76'; Escudé (yellow card) 86'	(Report)	(yellow card) 82' Cuéllar; (yellow card) 85' Nekounam; (yellow card) 87' Muñoz	Stadium: Ramón Sánchez Pizjuán; Attendance: 42,000; Referee: (England) Graham Poll

Sevilla won 2–1 on aggregate

==== Final ====
16 May 2007
20:45 CEST

Espanyol (Spain)	2–2 (a.e.t.)	Sevilla
Riera 28'; Jônatas 115'	(Report)	Adriano 18'; Kanouté 105'
Penalties
Luis García (penalty missed); Pandiani (penalty scored); Jônatas (penalty missed); Torrejón (penalty missed)	1–3	(penalty scored) Kanouté; (penalty scored) Dragutinović; (penalty missed) Alves; (penalty scored) Puerta

Hampden Park, Glasgow
Attendance: 47,602
Referee: (Switzerland) Massimo Busacca

Espanyol	Sevilla

ESPANYOL:
GK	1	(Spain) Gorka Iraizoz
RB	8	(Argentina) Pablo Zabaleta
CB	21	(Spain) Daniel Jarque
CB	19	(Spain) Marc Torrejón
LB	3	(Spain) David García
DM	22	(Spain) Moisés Hurtado	(yellow card) 68' (yellow-red card)
RM	18	(Spain) Francisco Rufete	(substituted off) 56'
LM	11	(Spain) Albert Riera
AM	9	(Spain) Iván de la Peña		(substituted off) 87'
CF	10	(Spain) Luis García
CF	23	(Spain) Raúl Tamudo (c)	(substituted off) 73'
Substitutes:
GK	25	(Cameroon) Carlos Kameni
DF	4	(Spain) Jesús María Lacruz	(substituted on) 73'
DF	30	(Spain) Javi Chica
MF	6	(Brazil) Eduardo Costa
MF	16	(Brazil) Jônatas	(substituted on) 87'
FW	7	(Uruguay) Walter Pandiani	(substituted on) 56'
FW	20	(Spain) Ferran Corominas
Manager:
(Spain) Ernesto Valverde

SEVILLA:
GK	1	(Spain) Andrés Palop
RB	4	(Brazil) Dani Alves
CB	2	(Spain) Javi Navarro (c)
CB	19	(Serbia) Ivica Dragutinović
LB	16	(Spain) Antonio Puerta	(yellow card) 115'
RM	18	(Spain) José Luis Martí
CM	8	(Denmark) Christian Poulsen
LM	6	(Brazil) Adriano		(substituted off) 76'
AM	25	(Italy) Enzo Maresca		(substituted off) 46'
CF	12	(Mali) Frédéric Kanouté	(yellow card) 82'
CF	10	(Brazil) Luís Fabiano	(yellow card) 62'	(substituted off) 64'
Substitutes:
GK	13	(Spain) David Cobeño
DF	3	(Spain) David Castedo
DF	20	(Spain) Aitor Ocio
MF	11	(Brazil) Renato		(substituted on) 76'
MF	15	(Spain) Jesús Navas		(substituted on) 46'
FW	7	(Uruguay) Javier Chevantón
FW	9	(Russia) Aleksandr Kerzhakov		(substituted on) 64'
Manager:
(Spain) Juande Ramos

Man of the Match:
(Spain) Andrés Palop (Sevilla)

Assistant referees:
(Switzerland) Matthias Arnet
(Switzerland) Stéphane Cuhat
Fourth official:
(Switzerland) Carlo Bertolini

UEFA Cup
2006–07 Winners
Sevilla FC
2nd Title

=== Copa del Rey ===
==== Round of 32 ====
25 October 2006 First leg	Gimnástica Segoviana	0–1	Sevilla	Segovia
20:30 CEST	Juanmi (red card) 31'; Ramsés (yellow card); Jesús (yellow card)	(Report)	36' Kepa; (yellow card) Ocio	Stadium: La Albuera; Attendance: 4,000; Referee: (Castilla–La Mancha) Alfonso Pino Zamorano

8 November 2006 Second leg	Sevilla	3–0	Gimnástica Segoviana	Seville
21:00 CET	Maresca 19' (pen.); Ocio 42'; Duda 59'	(Report)	(yellow card) 20' Ramsés; (red card) 82' Mariano	Stadium: Ramón Sánchez Pizjuán; Attendance: 25,000; Referee: (Canary Islands) Manuel Angel Pérez Lima

Sevilla FC won 4–0 on aggregate

==== Round of 16 ====
10 January 2007 First leg	Rayo Vallecano	0–0	Sevilla	Madrid
20:00 CET	Mainz (yellow card) 12'	(Report)	(yellow card) 44' Ocio; (yellow card) 58' Maresca	Stadium: Teresa Rivero; Referee: (Basque Country (autonomous community)) Miguel Angel Pérez Lasa

17 January 2007 Second leg	Sevilla	3–1	Rayo Vallecano	Seville
21:00 CET	Alfaro 17', 85'; Alves (yellow card) 64'; Kanouté 70'	(Report)	23', (yellow card) 27' Cubillo; (yellow card) 58' Collantes; (yellow card) 88' Mainz	Stadium: Ramón Sánchez Pizjuán; Referee: (Catalonia) Alfonso Javier Álvarez Izquierdo

Sevilla won 3–1 on aggregate

==== Quarter-finals ====
1 February 2007 First leg	Sevilla	0–0	Real Betis	Seville
21:00 CET		(Report)	(yellow card) 53' Melli; (yellow card) 72' Capi	Stadium: Ramón Sánchez Pizjuán; Referee: (Cantabria) Alfonso Pérez Burrull

28 February 2007 Second leg	Real Betis	0 – 1 Interrupted 59'	Sevilla	Seville
21:00 CET	Nano (yellow card) 45+1'	(Report)	(yellow card) 45+1' Navarro; 56' Kanouté	Stadium: Manuel Ruiz de Lopera; Referee: (Navarre) Alberto Undiano Mallenco

20 March 2007 Second leg	Real Betis	0 – 0 Played from 59'	Sevilla	Getafe (Madrid)
20:00 CET		(Report)	(yellow card) 62' Melli; (yellow card) 74' Rivas; (yellow card) 88' Maldonado	Stadium: El Coliséum; Referee: (Navarre) Alberto Undiano Mallenco

Sevilla won 1–0 on aggregate

==== Semi-finals ====
18 April 2007 First leg	Deportivo	0–3	Sevilla	A Coruña
21:00 CEST	Duscher (yellow card) 44'; Andrade (yellow card) 53'	(Report)	11' Kanouté; 13' Navas; (yellow card) 26' Dragutinović; (yellow card) 63' Alves; (yellow card) 83' Navarro; 89' (pen.) Luís Fabiano	Stadium: Riazor; Referee: (Castile and León) Julián Rodríguez Santiago

9 May 2007 Second leg	Sevilla	2–0	Deportivo	Seville
21:00 CEST	Duda 3'; Chevantón 33'	(Report)	(yellow card) 23' Andrade	Stadium: Ramón Sánchez Pizjuán; Referee: (Community of Madrid) Carlos Megía Dávila

Sevilla FC won 5–0 on aggregate

==== Final ====
23 June 2007
22:00 CEST

Sevilla	1–0	Getafe
Kanouté 10'	(Report)

Santiago Bernabéu, Madrid
Attendance: 80,000
Referee: (Castile and León) Julián Rodríguez Santiago

Sevilla	Getafe

SEVILLA:
GK	1	(Spain) Andrés Palop
RB	4	(Brazil) Dani Alves
CB	2	(Spain) Javi Navarro (c)
CB	14	(France) Julien Escudé
LB	19	(Serbia) Ivica Dragutinović
RM	15	(Spain) Jesús Navas
CM	8	(Denmark) Christian Poulsen
AM	11	(Brazil) Renato	(yellow card) 26'	(substituted off) 80'
LM	16	(Spain) Antonio Puerta		(substituted off) 74'
CF	10	(Brazil) Luís Fabiano		(substituted off) 48'
CF	12	(Mali) Frédéric Kanouté	(red card) 90+2'
Substitutes:
GK	13	(Spain) David Cobeño
DF	20	(Spain) Aitor Ocio
MF	18	(Spain) José Luis Martí		(substituted on) 80'
MF	5	(Portugal) Duda	(yellow card) 90+2'	(substituted on) 74'
MF	25	(Italy) Enzo Maresca
FW	7	(Uruguay) Javier Chevantón
FW	9	(Russia) Aleksandr Kerzhakov		(substituted on) 48'
Manager:
(Spain) Juande Ramos

GETAFE:
GK	1	(Spain) Luis García
RB	2	(Romania) Cosmin Contra	(red card) 90+5'	(substituted off) 84'
CB	4	(Spain) David Belenguer (c)	(yellow card) 49'
CB	5	(Spain) Rubén Pulido	(yellow card) 90+2'
LB	3	(Spain) Javier Paredes	(yellow card) 39'
RM	7	(Spain) Mario Cotelo
CM	6	(Switzerland) Fabio Celestini	(yellow card) 87'
AM	21	(Spain) Javier Casquero
LM	15	(Spain) Nacho	(yellow card) 63'	(substituted off) 70'
CF	19	(Spain) Daniel Güiza	(yellow card) 45'
CF	18	(Spain) Manu		(substituted off) 76'
Substitutes:
GK	32	(Spain) Manuel Arroyo
DF	21	(Spain) David Cortés
DF	20	(Spain) Alexis
MF	24	(Spain) Alberto
MF	8	(Spain) Ángel Vivar Dorado		(substituted on) 70'
FW	17	(Spain) Sergio Pachón		(substituted on) 84'
FW	9	(Latvia) Māris Verpakovskis		(substituted on) 76'
Manager:
(Germany) Bernd Schuster

Man of the Match:
(Mali) Frédéric Kanouté (Sevilla)

Assistant referees:
(Region of Murcia) Pedro Medina Hernández
(Cantabria) Victoriano Díaz Casado
Fourth official:
(Asturias) César Muñiz Fernández

Copa del Rey
2006–07 Winners
Sevilla
4th Title
