= 2005–06 Sevilla FC season =

97th season in existence of Sevilla FC

Sevilla FC
2005–06 season
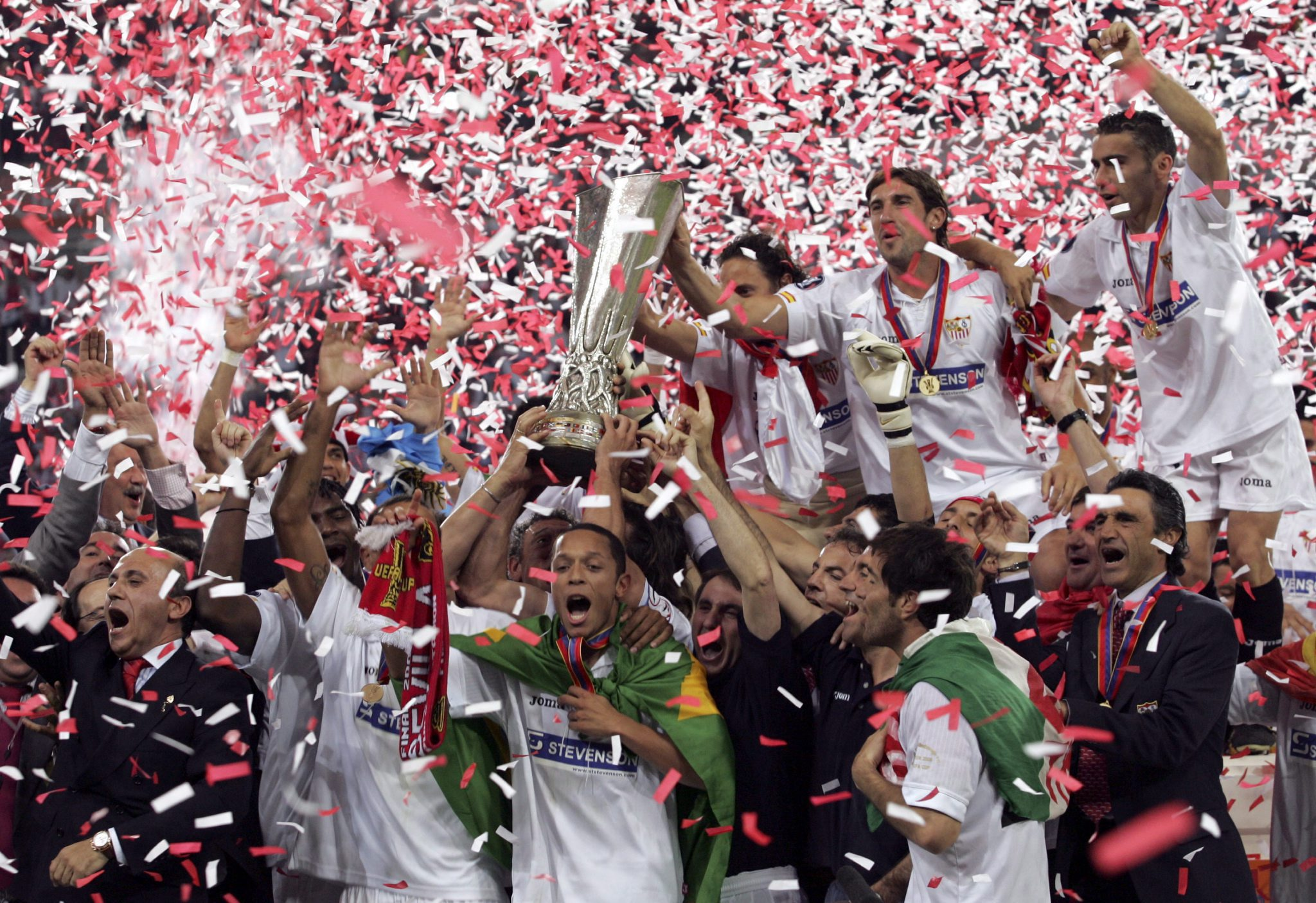
- Sevilla players celebrating their triumph in the 2006 UEFA Cup Final
- Manager: Juande Ramos
- Stadium: Ramón Sánchez Pizjuán
- La Liga: 5th
- Copa del Rey: Round of 16
- UEFA Cup: Winners
- Top goalscorer: League: Javier Saviola (9); All: Frédéric Kanouté (14)

== Season summary ==
Sevilla came on fifth place in the domestic league with 68 points in total. Fourth-placed Osasuna also got 68 points, but won one more game. In the Copa del Rey, the team lost in the round of 16 against Cádiz. In the UEFA Cup, the team won their first ever European tournament by defeating Middlesbrough by 4–0 in the final.

== Summer transfers ==
=== In ===
(substituted on) In (5 players)
Player	From	Fee
(Mali) Frédéric Kanouté	(England) Tottenham	€6.5M
(Serbia and Montenegro) Ivica Dragutinović	(Belgium) Standard Liège	
(Brazil) Luis Fabiano	(Portugal) Porto	
(Italy) Enzo Maresca	(Italy) Fiorentina	€2.5M
(Spain) Andrés Palop	(Spain) Valencia	

== Winter transfers ==
=== In ===
(substituted on) In (1 players)
Player	From	Fee
(France) Julien Escudé	(Netherlands) Ajax	€1.5M

== First-team squad ==
Squad at end of season

Note: Flags indicate national team as defined under FIFA eligibility rules; some limited exceptions apply. Players may hold more than one non-FIFA nationality.

No.	Pos.	Nation	Player
1	GK	ESP	Andrés Palop
2	DF	ESP	Javier Navarro (captain)
3	DF	ESP	David Castedo
4	DF	BRA	Dani Alves
7	FW	ARG	Javier Saviola
8	MF	ESP	Jordi Lopez
9	FW	POR	Ariza Makukula
10	FW	BRA	Luis Fabiano
11	MF	BRA	Renato
12	FW	MLI	Frédéric Kanouté
13	GK	ESP	Antonio Notario
14	DF	FRA	Julien Escudé
15	MF	ESP	Jesús Navas

No.	Pos.	Nation	Player
16	MF	BRA	Adriano Correia
17	MF	ESP	Jesuli
18	MF	ESP	José Luis Martí
19	DF	SCG	Ivica Dragutinović
20	DF	ESP	Aitor Ocio
22	MF	ESP	Fernando Sales
23	DF	ESP	Pablo
25	MF	ITA	Enzo Maresca
27	MF	ESP	Antonio Puerta
28	DF	ESP	David Prieto
30	FW	ESP	Kepa
34	MF	ESP	Diego Capel
35	DF	ESP	José Ángel Crespo

== Competitions ==
=== La Liga ===
==== League table ====
Pos	Team	Pld	W	D	L	GF	GA	GD	Pts	Qualification or relegation
3	Valencia	38	19	12	7	58	33	+25	69	Qualification for the Champions League third qualifying round
4	Osasuna	38	21	5	12	49	43	+6	68	Qualification for the Champions League third qualifying round
5	Sevilla	38	20	8	10	54	39	+15	68	Qualification for the UEFA Cup first round
6	Celta Vigo	38	20	4	14	45	33	+12	64	Qualification for the UEFA Cup first round
7	Villarreal	38	14	15	9	50	39	+11	57	Qualification for the Intertoto Cup third round

Source: LFP
Rules for classification: 1st points; 2nd head-to-head points; 3rd head-to-head goal difference; 4th head-to-head goals scored; 5th goal difference; 6th number of goals scored; 7th Fair-play points

=== Copa del Rey ===
==== Round of 16 ====
4 January 2006	Cádiz	3–2	Sevilla	Estadio Ramón de Carranza
18:00	Mirosavljević 25'; Medina 27'; Martí 59' (o.g.)		Kanouté 70', 88'	Attendance: 12,000; Referee: Bernardino González Vázquez

11 January 2006	Sevilla	0–0 (2–3 agg.)	Cádiz	Ramón Sánchez Pizjuán Stadium, Seville
18:00

=== UEFA Cup ===
==== First round ====
15 September 2005	Sevilla (Spain)	0–0	(Germany) Mainz 05	Ramón Sánchez Pizjuán Stadium, Seville
21:30		Report		Attendance: 34,160; Referee: Rob Styles

29 September 2005	Mainz 05 (Germany)	0–2 (0–2 agg.)	(Spain) Sevilla	Commerzbank-Arena, Frankfurt
20:30		Report	Kanouté 9', 40'	Attendance: 33,400; Referee: Matteo Trefoloni

==== Group stage ====
Pos	Team	Pld	W	D	L	GF	GA	GD	Pts	Qualification	SEV	ZEN	BOL	BJK	VIT
1	(Spain) Sevilla	4	2	1	1	8	4	+4	7	Advance to knockout stage	—	—	—	3–0	3–1
2	(Russia) Zenit Saint Petersburg	4	2	1	1	5	4	+1	7	Advance to knockout stage	2–1	—	—	—	2–1
3	(England) Bolton Wanderers	4	1	3	0	4	3	+1	6	Advance to knockout stage	1–1	1–0	—	—	—
4	(Turkey) Beşiktaş	4	1	2	1	5	6	−1	5		—	1–1	1–1	—	—
5	(Portugal) Vitória de Guimarães	4	0	1	3	4	9	−5	1		—	—	1–1	1–3	—

3 November 2005	Sevilla (Spain)	3–0	(Turkey) Beşiktaş	Ramón Sánchez Pizjuán Stadium, Seville
21:30	Saviola 64'; Kanouté 65', 89'	Report		Attendance: 27,862; Referee: Johan Verbist

24 November 2005	Zenit Saint Petersburg (Russia)	2–1	(Spain) Sevilla	Petrovsky Stadium, Saint Petersburg
18:30	Kerzhakov 11', 88'	Report	Saviola 90+3' (pen.)	Attendance: 12,500; Referee: Philippe Leuba

1 December 2005	Sevilla (Spain)	3–1	(Portugal) Vitória de Guimarães	Ramón Sánchez Pizjuán Stadium, Seville
21:30	Saviola 10', 28'; Adriano 39'	Report	Benachour 44'	Attendance: 30,306; Referee: Paolo Bertini

14 December 2005	Bolton Wanderers (England)	1–1	(Spain) Sevilla	Reebok Stadium, Bolton
20:45	Ngotty 66'	Report	Adriano 74'	Attendance: 15,623; Referee: Michael Weiner

==== Knockout stage ====
===== Round of 32 =====
15 February 2006	Lokomotiv Moscow (Russia)	0–1	(Spain) Sevilla	Lokomotiv Stadium, Moscow
17:30		Report	López 75'	Attendance: 10,223; Referee: Steve Bennett

23 February 2006	Sevilla (Spain)	2–0 (3–0 agg.)	(Russia) Lokomotiv Moscow	Ramón Sánchez Pizjuán Stadium, Seville
21:30	Maresca 34'; Puerta 90'	Report		Attendance: 19,970; Referee: Alain Sars

===== Round of 16 =====
9 March 2006	Lille (France)	1–0	(Spain) Sevilla	Stadium Nord Lille Métropole, Lille
19:00	Dernis 24'	Report		Attendance: 11,009; Referee: Wolfgang Stark

15 March 2006	Sevilla (Spain)	2–0 (2–1 agg.)	(France) Lille	Ramón Sánchez Pizjuán Stadium, Seville
21:00	Kanouté 29'; Luís Fabiano 45+2'	Report		Attendance: 33,660; Referee: Mike Riley

===== Quarter-finals =====
30 March 2006	Sevilla (Spain)	4–1	(Russia) Zenit St Petersburg	Ramón Sánchez Pizjuán Stadium, Seville
21:00	Saviola 14', 80'; Martí 56' (pen.); Adriano 90+3'	Report	Kerzhakov 45'	Attendance: 28,633; Referee: Alain Hamer

6 April 2006	Zenit Saint Petersburg (Russia)	1–1 (2–5 agg.)	(Spain) Sevilla	Petrovsky Stadium, Saint Petersburg
18:00	Hyun 50'	Report	Kepa 66'	Attendance: 17,028; Referee: Stefano Farina

===== Semi-finals =====
20 April 2006	Schalke 04 (Germany)	0–0	(Spain) Sevilla	Veltins-Arena, Gelsenkirchen
20:30		Report		Attendance: 53,551; Referee: Tom Henning Øvrebø

27 April 2006	Sevilla (Spain)	1–0 (a.e.t.) (1–0 agg.)	(Germany) Schalke 04	Ramón Sánchez Pizjuán Stadium, Seville
21:30	Puerta 101'	Report		Attendance: 39,475; Referee: Massimo De Santis

===== Final =====
10 May 2006	Middlesbrough (England)	0–4	(Spain) Sevilla	Philips Stadion, Eindhoven
20:45 UTC+2		Report	Luís Fabiano 27'; Maresca 78', 84'; Kanouté 89'	Attendance: 32,100; Referee: Herbert Fandel
