= 2007 UEFA Cup final =

- Match programme logo
- Event: 2006–07 UEFA Cup
Espanyol	Sevilla
(Spain)	(Spain)
2	2
- After extra time Sevilla won 3–1 on penalties
- Date: 16 May 2007
- Venue: Hampden Park, Glasgow
- Man of the Match: Andrés Palop (Sevilla)
- Referee: Massimo Busacca (Switzerland)
- Attendance: 47,602
- Weather: Rain; 15 °C (59 °F); 69% humidity

The 2007 UEFA Cup final was a football match that took place on 16 May 2007 at Hampden Park in Glasgow, Scotland.

In an all-Spanish final, holders Sevilla defeated Espanyol 3–1 on penalties after drawing 2–2 after extra-time, becoming the first club to win the competition two years in succession since the mid-1980s (Real Madrid won the competition in 1985 and 1986). Frédéric Kanouté was among the scorers for a second successive year.

Sevilla also won the 2006–07 Copa del Rey a month later, having also claimed the 2006 UEFA Super Cup at the start of the season. Both the continental title and domestic cup would have entitled them to defend the UEFA Cup again, but their 3rd-place finish in the 2006–07 La Liga instead placed them into the 2007–08 UEFA Champions League, where their performance (reaching the group stage then winning the group) did not lead to them falling back into the UEFA Cup pathway.

It was a second UEFA Cup final loss for Espanyol in as many appearances; the previous occasion in 1988 also ended in defeat on penalties (following a 3–0 home win and a 3–0 away defeat against Bayer Leverkusen).

Each club endured a tragedy in the period following their 2007 meeting with the sudden death of a much-loved serving and homegrown player who had played the entirety of the Glasgow final, both from heart-related issues and with the partners of both men expecting their child at the time of their death: Antonio Puerta of Sevilla (August 2007, aged 22) and Daniel Jarque of Espanyol (August 2009, aged 26).

== Route to the final ==
(Spain) Espanyol				Round	(Spain) Sevilla			
Opponent	Agg.	1st leg	2nd leg	Initial phase	Opponent	Agg.	1st leg	2nd leg
(Slovakia) Artmedia Bratislava	5–3	2–2 (A)	3–1 (H)	First round	(Greece) Atromitos	6–1	2–1 (A)	4–0 (H)
Opponent	Result			Group stage	Opponent	Result		
(Czech Republic) Sparta Prague	2–0 (A)			Matchday 1	(Czech Republic) Slovan Liberec	0–0 (A)		
Bye				Matchday 2	Bye			
(Belgium) Zulte Waregem	6–2 (H)			Matchday 3	(Portugal) Braga	2–0 (H)		
(Netherlands) Ajax	2–0 (A)			Matchday 4	(Switzerland) Grasshopper	4–0 (A)		
Austria Wien	1–0 (H)			Matchday 5	(Netherlands) AZ	1–2 (H)		
Group F winners: Pos / Team / Pld / Pts; 1 / (Spain) Espanyol / 4 / 12; 2 / (Netherlands) Ajax / 4 / 7; 3 / (Belgium) Zulte Waregem / 4 / 6; 4 / (Czech Republic) Sparta Prague / 4 / 4; 5 / Austria Wien / 4 / 0; Source:				Final standings	Group C runners-up: Pos / Team / Pld / Pts; 1 / (Netherlands) AZ / 4 / 10; 2 / (Spain) Sevilla / 4 / 7; 3 / (Portugal) Braga / 4 / 6; 4 / (Czech Republic) Slovan Liberec / 4 / 5; 5 / (Switzerland) Grasshopper / 4 / 0; Source:			
Opponent	Agg.	1st leg	2nd leg	Knockout stage	Opponent	Agg.	1st leg	2nd leg
(Italy) Livorno	4–1	2–1 (A)	2–0 (H)	Round of 32	(Romania) Steaua București	3–0	2–0 (A)	1–0 (H)
(Israel) Maccabi Haifa	4–0	0–0 (A)	4–0 (H)	Round of 16	(Ukraine) Shakhtar Donetsk	5–4 (a.e.t.)	2–2 (H)	3–2 (a.e.t.) (A)
(Portugal) Benfica	3–2	3–2 (H)	0–0 (A)	Quarter-finals	(England) Tottenham Hotspur	4–3	2–1 (H)	2–2 (A)
(Germany) Werder Bremen	5–1	3–0 (H)	2–1 (A)	Semi-finals	(Spain) Osasuna	2–1	0–1 (A)	2–0 (H)

== Match ==
=== Details ===
16 May 2007
19:45 UTC+1

Espanyol (Spain)	2–2 (a.e.t.)	(Spain) Sevilla
Riera 28'; Jônatas 115'	Report	Adriano 18'; Kanouté 105'
Penalties
L. García (penalty missed); Pandiani (penalty scored); Jônatas (penalty missed); Torrejón (penalty missed)	1–3	(penalty scored) Kanouté; (penalty scored) Dragutinović; (penalty missed) Dani Alves; (penalty scored) Puerta

Hampden Park, Glasgow
Attendance: 47,602
Referee: Massimo Busacca (Switzerland)

Espanyol	Sevilla

GK	1	(Spain) Gorka Iraizoz
RB	8	(Argentina) Pablo Zabaleta
CB	21	(Spain) Daniel Jarque
CB	19	(Spain) Marc Torrejón
LB	3	(Spain) David García
DM	22	(Spain) Moisés Hurtado	(yellow card) 23' (yellow-red card) 68'
RM	18	(Spain) Francisco Rufete		(substituted off) 56'
LM	11	(Spain) Albert Riera
AM	9	(Spain) Iván de la Peña		(substituted off) 87'
CF	10	(Spain) Luis García
CF	23	(Spain) Raúl Tamudo (c)		(substituted off) 73'
Substitutes:
GK	25	(Cameroon) Carlos Kameni
DF	4	(Spain) Jesús María Lacruz		(substituted on) 73'
DF	30	(Spain) Javi Chica
MF	6	(Brazil) Eduardo Costa
MF	16	(Brazil) Jônatas		(substituted on) 87'
FW	7	(Uruguay) Walter Pandiani		(substituted on) 56'
FW	20	(Spain) Coro
Manager:
(Spain) Ernesto Valverde

GK	1	(Spain) Andrés Palop
RB	4	(Brazil) Dani Alves
CB	2	(Spain) Javi Navarro (c)
CB	19	(Serbia) Ivica Dragutinović
LB	16	(Spain) Antonio Puerta	(yellow card) 115'
DM	8	(Denmark) Christian Poulsen
RM	18	(Spain) José Luis Martí
LM	6	(Brazil) Adriano		(substituted off) 76'
AM	25	(Italy) Enzo Maresca		(substituted off) 46'
CF	12	(Mali) Frédéric Kanouté	(yellow card) 82'
CF	10	(Brazil) Luís Fabiano	(yellow card) 62'	(substituted off) 64'
Substitutes:
GK	13	(Spain) David Cobeño
DF	3	(Spain) David Castedo
DF	20	(Spain) Aitor Ocio
MF	11	(Brazil) Renato		(substituted on) 76'
MF	15	(Spain) Jesús Navas		(substituted on) 46'
FW	7	(Uruguay) Javier Chevantón
FW	9	(Russia) Aleksandr Kerzhakov		(substituted on) 64'
Manager:
(Spain) Juande Ramos

Man of the Match:
Andrés Palop (Sevilla)

Assistant referees:
Matthias Arnet (Switzerland)
Stéphane Cuhat (Switzerland)
Fourth official:
Carlo Bertolini (Switzerland)

Match rules

- 90 minutes
- 30 minutes of extra time if necessary
- Penalty shoot-out if scores still level
- Seven named substitutes, of which three may be used

=== Statistics ===
First half
Statistic	Espanyol	Sevilla
Goals scored	1	1
Total shots	9	8
Shots on target	5	1
Saves	0	4
Ball possession	56%	44%
Corner kicks	3	2
Fouls committed	8	6
Offsides	0	2
Yellow cards	1	0
Red cards	0	0

Second half and extra time
Statistic	Espanyol	Sevilla
Goals scored	1	1
Total shots	6	20
Shots on target	4	8
Saves	7	3
Ball possession	35%	65%
Corner kicks	7	12
Fouls committed	15	9
Offsides	0	2
Yellow cards	1	3
Red cards	1	0

Overall
Statistic	Espanyol	Sevilla
Goals scored	2	2
Total shots	15	28
Shots on target	9	9
Saves	7	7
Ball possession	43%	57%
Corner kicks	10	14
Fouls committed	23	15
Offsides	0	4
Yellow cards	2	3
Red cards	1	0

== See also ==
- 2007 UEFA Champions League final
- 2007 UEFA Super Cup
- RCD Espanyol in European football
- Sevilla FC in European football
- Spanish football clubs in international competitions
- 2006–07 RCD Espanyol season
- 2006–07 Sevilla FC season
