= 2006 UEFA Cup final =

- Match programme cover
- Event: 2005–06 UEFA Cup
Middlesbrough	Sevilla
(England)	(Spain)
0	4
- Date: 10 May 2006
- Venue: Philips Stadion, Eindhoven
- Man of the Match: Enzo Maresca (Sevilla)
- Referee: Herbert Fandel (Germany)
- Attendance: 32,100

The 2006 UEFA Cup final was a football match that took place at Philips Stadion in Eindhoven, Netherlands on 10 May 2006 as the culmination of the 2005–06 UEFA Cup. The match was contested by Middlesbrough of England and Sevilla of Spain. Both sides were making their first appearance in a European final; it was Middlesbrough's second season of European competition, while Sevilla had more previous experience in both the UEFA Cup and the European Cup. Both sides had qualified for the competition based on their domestic league positions the previous season, and entered in the first round. To reach the final, they subsequently had to progress through the group stage and knockout rounds to reach the final. Middlesbrough eliminated VfB Stuttgart, Roma, Basel and Steaua București in the knockout stages, while Sevilla beat Lokomotiv Moscow, Lille, Zenit Saint Petersburg and Schalke 04.

In front of a crowd of 36,500, Sevilla dominated the final. They took the lead in the 27th minute, when Luís Fabiano headed in a cross from Dani Alves. Middlesbrough switched to an attacking formation in the 70th minute, but Sevilla were able to counter-attack, and doubled their advantage when Enzo Maresca scored from a rebound. Maresca scored his second six minutes later, and Frédéric Kanouté added another for Sevilla in the final minute, to make them 4–0 winners.

== Background ==
The UEFA Cup was an annual football club competition organised by UEFA since 1971 for eligible European football clubs. Clubs qualified for the competition based on their performance in their national leagues and cup competitions. It was the second-tier competition of European club football, ranking below the UEFA Champions League. In 2009, the UEFA Cup evolved into the Europa League.

Middlesbrough had made their first appearance in European football the previous season, when they were eliminated 4–2 by Sporting CP in the last-16. Sevilla's best European season had also been their first, when they reached the quarter-finals of the 1957–58 European Cup, before suffering a heavy 10–2 aggregate loss to Real Madrid. The two sides had never previously met. Middlesbrough qualified for the tournament due to their seventh-place finish in the 2004–05 FA Premier League, while Sevilla had finished sixth in the 2004–05 La Liga.

== Route to the final ==
(England) Middlesbrough				Round	(Spain) Sevilla			
Opponent	Agg.	1st leg	2nd leg	Initial phase	Opponent	Agg.	1st leg	2nd leg
(Greece) Skoda Xanthi	2–0	2–0 (H)	0–0 (A)	First round	(Germany) Mainz 05	2–0	0–0 (H)	2–0 (A)
Opponent	Result			Group stage	Opponent	Result		
(Switzerland) Grasshopper	1–0 (A)			Matchday 1	Bye			
(Ukraine) Dnipro Dnipropetrovsk	3–0 (H)			Matchday 2	(Turkey) Beşiktaş	3–0 (H)		
(Netherlands) AZ	0–0 (A)			Matchday 3	(Russia) Zenit Saint Petersburg	1–2 (A)		
Bye				Matchday 4	(Portugal) Vitória de Guimarães	3–1 (H)		
(Bulgaria) Litex Lovech	2–0 (H)			Matchday 5	(England) Bolton Wanderers	1–1 (A)		
Group D winners: Pos / Team / Pld / Pts; 1 / (England) Middlesbrough / 4 / 10; 2 / (Netherlands) AZ / 4 / 10; 3 / (Bulgaria) Litex Lovech / 4 / 6; 4 / (Ukraine) Dnipro Dnipropetrovsk / 4 / 3; 5 / (Switzerland) Grasshopper / 4 / 0; Source:				Final standings	Group H winners: Pos / Team / Pld / Pts; 1 / (Spain) Sevilla / 4 / 7; 2 / (Russia) Zenit Saint Petersburg / 4 / 7; 3 / (England) Bolton Wanderers / 4 / 6; 4 / (Turkey) Beşiktaş / 4 / 5; 5 / (Portugal) Vitória de Guimarães / 4 / 1; Source:			
Opponent	Agg.	1st leg	2nd leg	Knockout stage	Opponent	Agg.	1st leg	2nd leg
(Germany) VfB Stuttgart	2–2 (a)	2–1 (A)	0–1 (H)	Round of 32	(Russia) Lokomotiv Moscow	3–0	1–0 (A)	2–0 (H)
(Italy) Roma	2–2 (a)	1–0 (H)	1–2 (A)	Round of 16	(France) Lille	2–1	0–1 (A)	2–0 (H)
(Switzerland) Basel	4–3	0–2 (A)	4–1 (H)	Quarter-finals	(Russia) Zenit Saint Petersburg	5–2	4–1 (H)	1–1 (A)
(Romania) Steaua București	4–3	0–1 (A)	4–2 (H)	Semi-finals	(Germany) Schalke 04	1–0 (a.e.t.)	0–0 (A)	1–0 (a.e.t.) (H)

== Match ==
=== Summary ===
The final was played at Philips Stadion in Eindhoven, Netherlands on 10 May 2006, and kicked off at 20:45 CEST. The match was attended by 36,500 people. Sevilla kicked off the match, and had the first attack in the second minute: Dani Alves shot wide. Two minutes later, the Sevilla defender Javi Navarro fouled Mark Viduka, conceding a free kick which Fábio Rochemback struck straight at the Sevilla goalkeeper, Andrés Palop. Sevilla attacked twice more in the opening ten minutes, but on both occasions, the Middlesbrough defender Chris Riggott was able to put the ball behind for a corner kick. After 20 minutes, Sevilla attacked down their right wing; Alves had the opportunity to shoot, but passed the ball across to Javier Saviola, whose shot was blocked by Gareth Southgate. Six minutes later, Sevilla attacked through Alves again. He crossed the ball to Luís Fabiano who headed the ball in off the post to give Sevilla a 1–0 lead. Three minutes later, Sevilla had another chance at goal, but Adriano shot went over the crossbar. In the 34th minute, Middlesbrough won another corner, but it was easily cleared by the Sevilla defence. In the final five minutes of the first half, Sevilla pressed hard for a second goal, consistently putting crosses in the Middlesbrough penalty area. Their closest effort came when Julien Escudé headed wide from a José Luis Martí free kick, but despite their pressure, it remained 1–0 at half-time.

Both sides made changes at half-time: Middlesbrough replaced James Morrison with Massimo Maccarone, while Frédéric Kanouté replaced Saviola for Sevilla. The Spanish side continued to dominate the attacking play in the second half, and had two attacks in the first five minutes: Luís Fabiano could not connect with a cross from Alves, and shortly after Kanouté curled a shot wide. In the 51st minute, Middlesbrough had a rare attack; a free-kick from Rochemback was headed on by Riggott for Mark Viduka, who fired a shot from close-range, which was saved by Palop. Two minutes later, Alves was booked for foul on Stewart Downing. Middlesbrough had another chance at goal in the 59th minute, when Maccarone mishit a cross, which had to stopped at the near post by Palop. An injury to the defender Queudrue saw him replaced in the 69th minute; the BBC Sport report said that "McClaren went for broke", by replacing him with a striker, Yakubu. Sevilla also made a change, bringing on Renato to replace Fabiano. Alves penetrated the Middlesbrough defence again in the 73rd minute, and forced a save from Middlesbrough's goalkeeper, Mark Schwarzer. Middlesbrough had two attacks in quick succession: Viduka missed the target in the 75th minute, and appealed for a penalty after a strong challenge from Navarro two minutes later; however, the referee, Herbert Fandel, was unmoved. Sevilla went on the counter-attack directly after the appeal; outnumbering Middlesbrough, who had committed too many players to their attack, the ball was played wide to Jesús Navas, who passed it to Kanouté. The Malian striker shot was blocked by Schwarzer, but the rebound fell to Enzo Maresca, who scored to make it 2–0. Maresca scored his second six minutes later, with a low shot from 20 yards, which The Guardian's Mike Adamson suggested Schwarzer should have saved. Both sides each made another substitution: Viduka was replaced by Lee Cattermole, and Antonio Puerta replaced Adriano. In the 89th minute, a shot from Navas was palmed away by Schwarzer, and Kanouté connected with the rebound to put Sevilla 4–0 ahead.

=== Details ===
10 May 2006
20:45 UTC+2

Middlesbrough (England)	0–4	(Spain) Sevilla
	Report	Luís Fabiano 27'; Maresca 78', 84'; Kanouté 89'

Philips Stadion, Eindhoven
Attendance: 32,100
Referee: Herbert Fandel (Germany)

Middlesbrough	Sevilla

GK	1	(Australia) Mark Schwarzer
RB	21	(England) Stuart Parnaby
CB	5	(England) Chris Riggott
CB	6	(England) Gareth Southgate (c)
LB	3	(France) Franck Queudrue		(substituted off) 70'
RM	25	(Scotland) James Morrison		(substituted off) 46'
CM	10	(Brazil) Fábio Rochemback	(yellow card) 83'
CM	7	(Netherlands) George Boateng
LM	19	(England) Stewart Downing
CF	36	(Australia) Mark Viduka		(substituted off) 85'
CF	9	(Netherlands) Jimmy Floyd Hasselbaink
Substitutes:
GK	22	(Australia) Brad Jones
DF	4	(England) Ugo Ehiogu
DF	26	(England) Matthew Bates
MF	15	(England) Ray Parlour
MF	39	(England) Lee Cattermole		(substituted on) 85'
FW	18	(Italy) Massimo Maccarone		(substituted on) 46'
FW	20	(Nigeria) Yakubu		(substituted on) 70'
Manager:
(England) Steve McClaren

GK	1	(Spain) Andrés Palop
RB	4	(Brazil) Dani Alves	(yellow card) 52'
CB	2	(Spain) Javi Navarro (c)
CB	6	(France) Julien Escudé	(yellow card) 81'
LB	3	(Spain) David Castedo
RM	15	(Spain) Jesús Navas
CM	18	(Spain) José Luis Martí
CM	25	(Italy) Enzo Maresca	(yellow card) 85'
LM	16	(Brazil) Adriano		(substituted off) 85'
CF	10	(Brazil) Luís Fabiano		(substituted off) 73'
CF	7	(Argentina) Javier Saviola		(substituted off) 46'
Substitutes:
GK	13	(Spain) Antonio Notario
DF	20	(Spain) Aitor Ocio
MF	11	(Brazil) Renato		(substituted on) 73'
MF	22	(Spain) Fernando Sales
MF	27	(Spain) Antonio Puerta		(substituted on) 85'
FW	31	(Spain) Kepa
FW	12	(Mali) Frédéric Kanouté		(substituted on) 46'
Manager:
(Spain) Juande Ramos

Man of the Match:
Enzo Maresca (Sevilla)

Assistant referee:
Volker Wezel (Germany)
Carsten Kadach (Germany)
Fourth official:
Florian Meyer (Germany)

Match rules

- 90 minutes
- 30 minutes of extra time if necessary
- Penalty shoot-out if scores still level
- Seven named substitutes
- Maximum of three substitutions

=== Statistics ===
First half
Statistic	Middlesbrough	Sevilla
Goals scored	0	1
Total shots	2	7
Shots on target	1	3
Saves	2	1
Ball possession	46%	54%
Corner kicks	3	3
Fouls committed	11	7
Offsides	1	0
Yellow cards	0	0
Red cards	0	0

Second half
Statistic	Middlesbrough	Sevilla
Goals scored	0	3
Total shots	5	12
Shots on target	2	9
Saves	6	2
Ball possession	48%	52%
Corner kicks	2	3
Fouls committed	10	6
Offsides	1	0
Yellow cards	1	3
Red cards	0	0

Overall
Statistic	Middlesbrough	Sevilla
Goals scored	0	4
Total shots	7	19
Shots on target	3	12
Saves	8	3
Ball possession	47%	53%
Corner kicks	5	6
Fouls committed	21	13
Offsides	2	0
Yellow cards	1	3
Red cards	0	0

== See also ==
- 2006 UEFA Champions League final
- 2006 UEFA Super Cup
- Middlesbrough F.C. in European football
- Sevilla FC in European football
- 2005–06 Middlesbrough F.C. season
- 2005–06 Sevilla FC season
