= David Castedo =

Spanish footballer

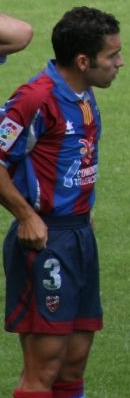
- David in action for Levante

Personal information
- Full name: David Castedo Escudero
- Date of birth: 26 January 1974 (age 52)
- Place of birth: Palma, Spain
- Height: 1.65 m (5 ft 5 in)
- Position: Left-back

Youth career
- Mallorca

Senior career*
Years	Team	Apps	(Gls)
1993–2000	Mallorca	119	(1)
1997–1998	→ Hércules (loan)	23	(1)
1998–1999	→ Extremadura (loan)	32	(0)
2000–2007	Sevilla	235	(0)
2007–2008	Levante	18	(0)
Total		427	(2)
- * Club domestic league appearances and goals

David Castedo Escudero (born 26 January 1974), sometimes known as just David, is a Spanish former professional footballer who played as a left-back. He was known for his tenacity.

He appeared in 255 La Liga games over ten seasons, mostly for Sevilla which he helped to win four major titles, including two UEFA Cups.

== Club career ==
A product of RCD Mallorca's youth academy, Castedo was born in Palma de Mallorca, and first played with the first team in the Segunda División. In the 1996–97 season, he appeared in 33 league matches as the club returned to La Liga.

Following two loan spells, first with Hércules CF then with CF Extremadura (the latter in the top division), David returned to the Balearic Islands, playing only eight games in his second spell but also scoring his first goal as a professional. Subsequently, he signed for Sevilla FC, where he experienced the most successful and steady years of his career: after contributing 39 appearances to help the Andalusians to a 2001 top-flight promotion, he went on to become one of the team's most important players, also being named, after Javi Navarro and José Luis Martí, captain.

Castedo made 33 league appearances in 2005–06, also playing all of that campaign's UEFA Cup matches as Sevilla lifted the trophy against Middlesbrough – 11 of those were complete. In the following year, due to the emergence of youth graduate Antonio Puerta and the consolidation of Ivica Dragutinović, he appeared less, but still managed 26 total appearances, including seven in the UEFA Cup as they renewed their European title.

After seven years at the Ramón Sánchez Pizjuán Stadium, David moved in August 2007 to Levante UD, who went on to be relegated from the main division at the end of the season. He retired aged 34, having played 511 games as a professional.

== Honours ==
Sevilla

- Copa del Rey: 2006–07
- UEFA Cup: 2005–06, 2006–07
- UEFA Super Cup: 2006
- Segunda División: 2000–01
