= Antonio Puerta =

Spanish footballer (1984–2007)

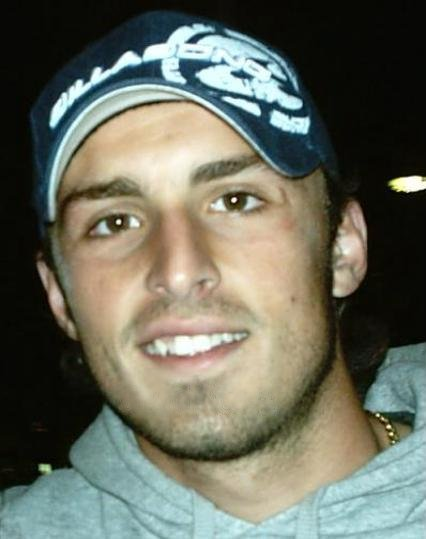
- Puerta in 2007

Personal information
- Full name: Antonio José Puerta Pérez
- Date of birth: 26 November 1984
- Place of birth: Seville, Spain
- Date of death: 28 August 2007 (aged 22)
- Place of death: Seville, Spain
- Height: 1.83 m (6 ft 0 in)
- Position: Wing-back

Youth career
- AD Nervión
- 1993–2002: Sevilla

Senior career*
Years	Team	Apps	(Gls)
2002–2005	Sevilla B	69	(6)
2004–2007	Sevilla	55	(5)
Total		124	(11)

International career
2004–2005	Spain U21	5	(0)
2005	Spain U23	5	(2)
2006	Spain	1	(0)
- * Club domestic league appearances and goals

Antonio José Puerta Pérez (Spanish pronunciation: [anˈtonjo ˈpweɾta]; 26 November 1984 – 28 August 2007) was a Spanish professional footballer who played solely for Sevilla.

Mainly a left midfielder who could also operate as an attacking left-back, he died on 28 August 2007 affected with arrhythmogenic cardiomyopathy, three days after suffering a series of cardiac arrests during a La Liga game against Getafe on the 25th.

Puerta won five trophies with his only club, and appeared once for Spain.

== Club career ==
Born in Seville, Andalusia, Puerta joined Sevilla as a boy and spent a total of 14 years at the club, growing up at its acclaimed youth system alongside other players such as Alejandro Alfaro, Kepa Blanco, Jesús Navas, Sergio Ramos and José Antonio Reyes. His La Liga debut came on 21 March 2004, as he played 71 minutes in a 0–1 home defeat against neighbours Málaga.

Promoted to the first team for the 2005–06 season, Puerta became intimately connected to Sevilla's history on 27 April 2006, when he scored against Schalke 04 in the semi-finals of the UEFA Cup: in the final moments of the match, he received a long ball and struck it with his left foot for the 1–0 final (and aggregate) win; they went on to collect five titles in fifteen months, with Puerta scoring his penalty shootout attempt in the 2007 UEFA Cup final, against compatriots Espanyol. His impressive performances earned him international recognition and reported interest from Arsenal, Manchester United and Real Madrid, but all bids were rejected.

=== Death ===
On 25 August 2007, Puerta collapsed and lost consciousness in the penalty area due to a cardiac arrest during Sevilla's first La Liga fixture of the 2007–08 campaign at the Ramón Sánchez-Pizjuán Stadium against Getafe. He was seen crouching and then subsequently collapsing upon moving back to his team's goal after only 35 minutes of the game had passed, as teammates Ivica Dragutinović and Andrés Palop immediately ran to his side as he lost consciousness; moments later, club medical staff and other players followed suit.

After recovering and being substituted, Puerta was able to walk to the dressing room, where he collapsed once again. He was resuscitated by the doctors and taken, by ambulance, to the intensive care unit of Virgen del Rocío hospital, where he received cardiopulmonary resuscitation.

Puerta died on 28 August 2007, at 14:30. Doctor Francisco Murillo reported that he had suffered multiple organ failure and irreversible brain damage as a result of multiple prolonged cardiac arrests due to an incurable, hereditary heart disease known as arrhythmogenic cardiomyopathy.

Puerta's girlfriend was expecting their first child at the time of his death. As a mark of respect, players from both Sevilla and city rivals Real Betis attended his funeral days after his death and, subsequently, FIFA ordered the installation of resuscitation rooms in every stadium that hosted the World Cup qualifiers.

=== Tributes ===
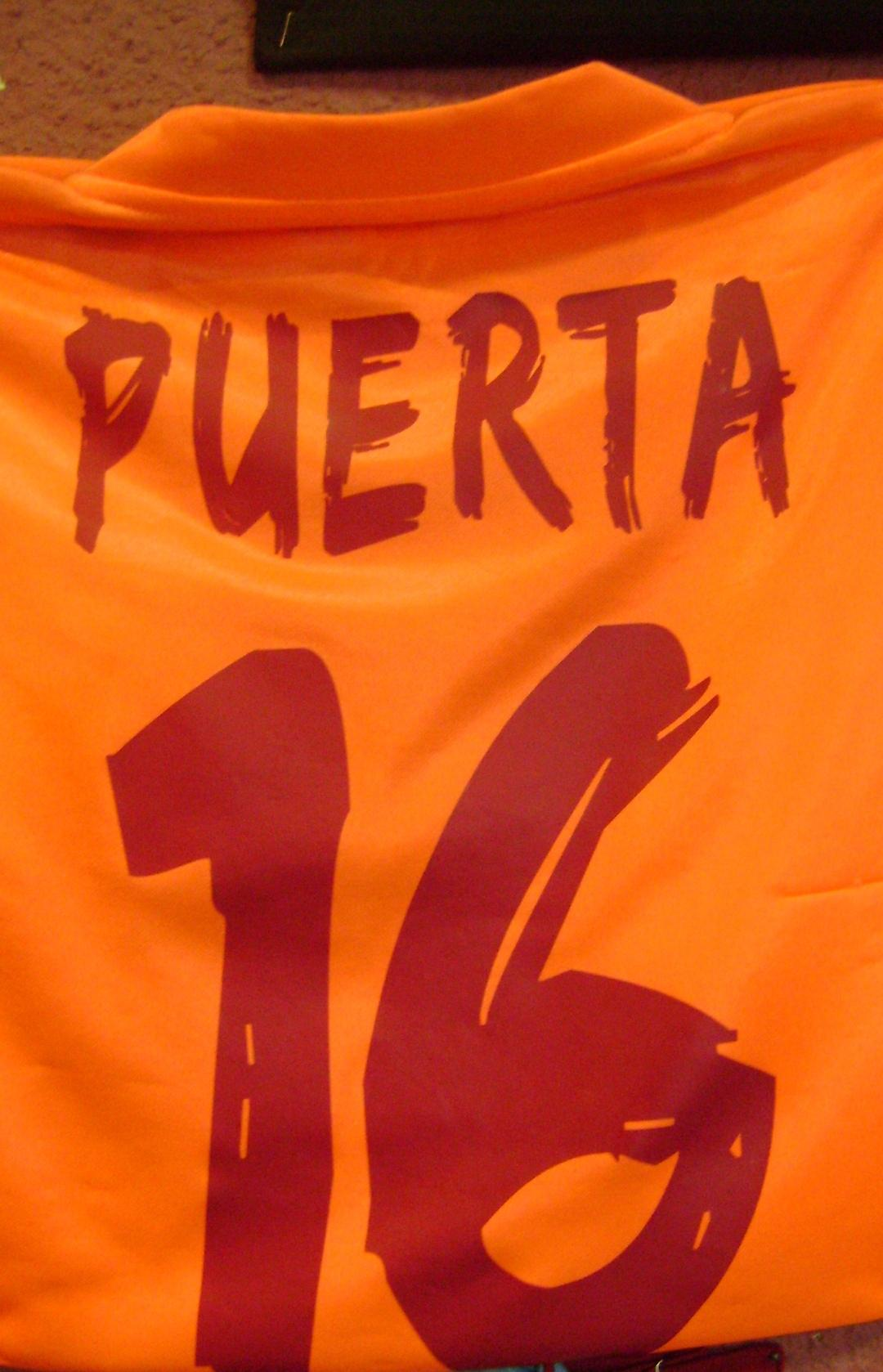
Sevilla retired Puerta's number 16 jersey after his death

As a result of Puerta's death, Sevilla's UEFA Champions League qualifier against AEK Athens was postponed until 3 September; the former eventually won 4–1. It was also announced that a one-minute silence would be held before every Spanish league match that weekend.

Additionally, the team's UEFA Super Cup game with AC Milan on 31 August went ahead, as a tribute to Puerta, with all 22 participants having the name 'PUERTA' printed on the back of their jersey. The players and officials on both sides also wore black armbands.

Sevilla subsequently retired Puerta's number 16 shirt, with the provision that should his son, Aitor Antonio (born 22 October 2007), one day play for the club, he would have the option to bring the number out of retirement. However, Spanish football teams were not allowed to do so, as the Royal Spanish Football Federation stated that clubs should use number 1 to 25 for their regular squad, with no additional room for manoeuvre; as a result, David Prieto wore the shirt in 2007–08 in honour of his friend but it was later decided that only youth products could wear that jersey.

Controversially, the number was given to Argentine Federico Fazio in 2016. One year later, it was awarded to Jesús Navas, a close friend of Puerta, upon his return in 2017.

Ramos wore T-shirts in memory of Puerta after Spain won UEFA Euro 2008 and the 2010 FIFA World Cup, with Navas doing the same on the latter occasion. Earlier in 2010, a statue of him was built in the club's José Ramón Cisneros Palacios sporting facilities.

== International career ==
Puerta was capped once by the Spain national side, playing against Sweden on 7 October 2006. He came on as a substitute for Deportivo de La Coruña's Joan Capdevila in the 52nd minute of a 2–0 away loss for the UEFA Euro 2008 qualifiers.

Additionally, Puerta appeared five times for the under-21s.

== Career statistics ==
Appearances and goals by club, season and competition
Club	Season	League			Copa del Rey		Europe		Other		Total	
Club	Season	Division	Apps	Goals	Apps	Goals	Apps	Goals	Apps	Goals	Apps	Goals
Sevilla	2003–04	La Liga	1	0	0	0	0	0	0	0	1	0
Sevilla	2004–05	La Liga	6	1	3	0	0	0	0	0	9	1
Sevilla	2005–06	La Liga	17	2	0	0	12 (Note: Appearances in UEFA Cup)	3	0	0	29	5
Sevilla	2006–07	La Liga	30	2	6	0	10	0	1 (Note: Appearance in UEFA Super Cup)	0	47	2
Sevilla	2007–08	La Liga	1	0	0	0	0	0	1 (Note: Appearance in Supercopa de España)	0	2	0
Career total			55	5	9	0	22	3	2	0	88	8

== Honours ==
Sevilla

- Copa del Rey: 2006–07
- Supercopa de España: 2007
- UEFA Cup: 2005–06, 2006–07
- UEFA Super Cup: 2006

Spain U23

- Mediterranean Games: 2005

== See also ==
- List of association footballers who died after on-field incidents
