= Julien Escudé =

French footballer (born 1979)

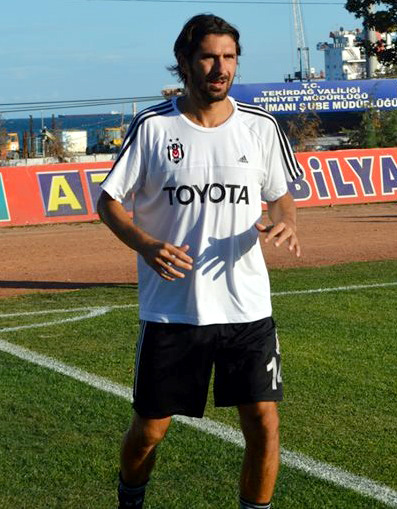
- Escudé training with Beşiktaş in 2013

Personal information
- Full name: Julien Régis Paul Escudé
- Date of birth: 17 August 1979 (age 47)
- Place of birth: Chartres, Eure-et-Loir, France
- Height: 1.84 m (6 ft 0 in)
- Position: Centre-back

Youth career
- 1994–1998: Cannes

Senior career*
| Years | Team | Apps | (Gls) |
| 1998–1999 | Cannes | 21 | (1) |
| 1999–2003 | Rennes | 111 | (0) |
| 2003–2006 | Ajax | 61 | (6) |
| 2006–2012 | Sevilla | 164 | (5) |
| 2012–2014 | Beşiktaş | 25 | (2) |
| Total | | 382 | (14) |

International career
| 1999–2002 | France U21 | 21 | (1) |
| 2006–2010 | France | 13 | (0) |
Medal record
Men's football
Representing France
UEFA European Under-21 Championship
| Runner-up | 2002 |
- * Club domestic league appearances and goals

Julien Régis Paul Escudé (born 17 August 1979) is a French former professional footballer who played mainly as a centre-back but also as a full-back.

After making a name for himself with Rennes, he went on to play abroad with Ajax, Sevilla and Beşiktaş. He was an important part of the Spanish club as it won six major titles, including two UEFA Cups; he appeared in 237 official games for the team.

Escudé earned 13 caps for France, but never went to a major tournament.

== Club career ==
=== France / Ajax ===
Escudé was born in Chartres, Eure-et-Loir. He began his professional career at AS Cannes, playing one season in the second division. On 26 July 1999, after some solid performances, the 20-year-old joined Ligue 1 club Stade Rennais FC, managed by young Paul Le Guen, where he gradually developed into a top flight player, amassing nearly 150 official appearances.

In the summer of 2003, Escudé signed with AFC Ajax, scoring six goals in his first two seasons combined at the Amsterdam Arena and winning the Eredivisie title in his first year. In August 2005, after a defeat against Feyenoord, he fell out of favour with manager Danny Blind, and never played a match for the Dutch side afterwards.

=== Sevilla ===
In January 2006, Escudé signed for Sevilla FC in Spain for €1.5 million, signing for the rest of the season plus three more. His La Liga debut came on 11 February as he featured nine minutes in a 4–0 win at Andalusia neighbours Cádiz CF; in the following round, he played the entire 1–0 home success against Celta de Vigo.

Escudé became an essential defensive unit in the following years for the Spaniards, helping them conquer a total of five titles (he played in the 2005–06 final of the UEFA Cup, a 4–0 win against England's Middlesbrough). His first goal for the team was on 18 November that year, opening a 3–0 home win over Valencia CF. His importance grew after the long injury layoff which bothered the captain of the team Javi Navarro, but he would also be sidelined for a long part of the 2007–08 season with a groin problem– they finished fifth, missing on qualification to the UEFA Champions League.

In June 2007, Escudé extended his contract for four more years, alongside Renato. When there was one year remaining on his deal, he signed again to keep himself at the Ramón Sánchez Pizjuán Stadium until 2013.

=== Beşiktaş ===
On 26 July 2012, Escudé signed for Beşiktaş J.K. of the Turkish Süper Lig after freeing himself from his Sevilla contract. After two years in Istanbul, and despite interest to bring him back to Rennes, he retired at the age of 35.

== International career ==
In March 2005, Escudé was called to the France national team for two qualifiers for the 2006 FIFA World Cup against Switzerland and Israel, but eventually did not make his debut. His first game was on 11 October 2006, playing as left-back against Faroe Islands for the UEFA Euro 2008 qualifying campaign– he was not picked for the final stage after a season of injuries.

On 18 November 2009, in the tenth minute of the second leg of the 2010 World Cup qualification playoffs against the Republic of Ireland, Escudé broke his nose and had to be stretchered off. He was also not selected for the squad of 23 which appeared in South Africa.

== Personal life ==
Escudé's older brother, Nicolas, played tennis professionally, reaching the top 20 in 2000. His father Paul, who died in 1998, was also a footballer, representing mainly Pau FC as a player and manager.

During his spell with Sevilla, Escudé played several matches with "SQD" on the back of his shirt, it being the phonetic spelling of his surname.

== Honours ==
Ajax

- Eredivisie: 2003–04
- Johan Cruyff Shield: 2005

Sevilla

- Copa del Rey: 2006–07, 2009–10
- UEFA Cup: 2005–06, 2006–07
- UEFA Super Cup: 2006
