= Pilas, Spain =

Pilas
- Flag Coat of arms

- Location in Andalusia
- Coordinates: 37°18′06″N 6°17′55″W
- Country: Spain
- Autonomous Community: Andalusia
- Province: Seville
- Comarca: Sevilla

Population (2025-01-01)
  - Total: 14,222
- Time zone: UTC+1 (CET)
  - Summer (DST): UTC+2 (CEST)

Pilas is a municipality in the province of Seville, Spain, in the western area of the Autonomous Community of Andalusia. Its location within the province implies its close proximity to other villages (such as El Rocío) or beaches (such as Matalascañas).

The first known human settlements date back to the Celtiberian period. During the Roman domination it belonged to the jurisdiction of Seville. It was called Pilias at the time of Al-Andalus, which is when it began to grow around a "Qubba", which still exists. In the surroundings it also had small Muslim farms. The tile factories located near the Alcarayón stream would later develop into the present-day village.

Following the Christian reconquest in the second half of the 13th century, Alfonso X decided to call it Torre del Rey. The village acquired prominence in the 15th century. Due to the importance of its livestock, the king Juan II of Castile granted the village grazing fields in the municipality of Aznalcázar. Since it was on the road to Mures (Villamanrique), Omnius (Hinojos) and Aznalcázar, drinking troughs or pilas for livestock were built in the village.

The growth of industrial activity in the first third of the 20th century contributed to the economic prosperity of the municipality.

== Geography ==
The town borders Huévar and Chucena to the north, Villamanrique de la Condesa to the south, Aznalcázar to the east, and Hinojos to the west (located in Huelva province).

=== Orography ===
The municipality is located on generally flat terrain with soft hills. The highest altitudes are found in the northern areas, in both Perú and de la Robaína (137 and 113 meters above sea level, respectively).

The composition of the land is mainly characterized by yellow, muddy, clay-like sands and various types of limestone, as well as the presence of carbonated sandstones with varying levels of hardness. The Alcarayón river alluvial plain is made up of relatively recently formed sediments (gravel, sand, silt, and loam).

The urban center is located on a hillside inclined eastward at a height of approximately 50 to 80 meters above sea level. A small riverbed to the southeast drains towards the Alcarayón river, a natural drainpipe towards the nearby marshland.

In addition to the river, other geographical cuts in the land render certain areas agriculturally unproductive; however, these areas offer considerable diversity in the area's natural flora and fauna. Two especially notable areas, Damiana and la Robaína, stand out for their landscapes and plant biodiversity.

Towards the south appear both marshland and low-sloping hills. In this area, the municipality reaches its lowest heights above sea level (35 meters above sea level).

Other important geographical features include the barreros, quarries of muddy clay that, although currently unused, were previously indispensable in the production of bricks, tiles, and ceramics.

The most commonly grown crop is the olive, manzanilla variety. Although less commonly grown, cereals, fruit trees and grapevines are also commonly grown.

== See also ==
- List of municipalities in Seville
