= Antonio López (footballer, born 1980) =

Spanish footballer

Personal information
- Full name: Antonio López Álvarez
- Date of birth: 12 May 1980 (age 46)
- Place of birth: Madrid, Spain
- Height: 1.73 m (5 ft 8 in)
- Position: Midfielder

Senior career*
Years	Team	Apps	(Gls)
1997–1999	Leganés B	14	(0)
1999–2000	Leganés	22	(2)
2000–2003	Valladolid	33	(3)
2002	→ Numancia (loan)	7	(2)
2003–2006	Sevilla	32	(1)
2006	→ Málaga (loan)	13	(0)
2006–2007	Castellón	19	(5)
2007–2009	Gimnàstic	30	(0)
2009–2011	Albacete	56	(5)
2012	Teruel	10	(0)
2012–2014	Fuenlabrada	57	(5)
Total		293	(23)
- * Club domestic league appearances and goals

Antonio López Álvarez (born 12 May 1980 in Madrid) is a Spanish former professional footballer who played as a left midfielder.
