= 2006 UEFA Super Cup =

- Match programme cover
- Event: 31st UEFA Super Cup
Barcelona	Sevilla
(Spain)	(Spain)
0	3
- Date: 25 August 2006
- Venue: Stade Louis II, Monaco
- Man of the Match: Dani Alves (Sevilla)
- Referee: Stefano Farina (Italy)
- Attendance: 17,480

The 2006 UEFA Super Cup was the 31st edition of the annual UEFA Super Cup, a UEFA-sponsored football club match that pitted the winners of the UEFA Champions League against the winners of the UEFA Cup. It took place at the Stade Louis II in Monaco, on 25 August 2006, and featured two Spanish clubs: Barcelona, who won the 2005–06 UEFA Champions League, against Sevilla, who took the 2005–06 UEFA Cup title. Sevilla beat Barcelona by 3–0 and added its first UEFA Super Cup trophy to its maiden UEFA Cup.

== Background ==
For the third time, two clubs from the same country played each other in the UEFA Super Cup, after the all-Italian 1990 and 1993 editions. Barcelona guaranteed a sixth presence in the UEFA Super Cup match, following their victorious campaign in the 2005–06 UEFA Champions League, where they defeated first-time finalists Arsenal by 2–1, at the Stade de France in Paris. Their first three presences—as 1979, 1982 and 1989 UEFA Cup Winners' Cup winners—resulted in an equal number of defeats. Having won their first European Cup title in 1992, Barcelona finally claimed the Super Cup trophy in their fourth attempt by beating Werder Bremen 3–2 on aggregate. Five years later, as 1997 UEFA Cup Winners' Cup holders they defeated another German club (Borussia Dortmund) to add a second Super Cup to their cabinet.

Spanish side Sevilla made their debut in the UEFA Super Cup by taking the 2005–06 UEFA Cup title with a 4–0 win over Middlesbrough in the final, held at the Philips Stadion in Eindhoven. This triumph was achieved in Sevilla's sixth participation in the UEFA Cup tournament, following participations in the 1982–83, 1983–84, 1990–91, 1995–96 and 2004–05 editions.

Before the 2006 UEFA Super Cup, the two clubs had previously met in European competition only once. It was in the third round of the 1995–96 UEFA Cup edition, and it resulted in a 4–2 aggregate win for Barcelona.

== Match ==
=== Details ===
25 August 2006
20:45 CEST

Barcelona (Spain)	0–3	(Spain) Sevilla
	Report	Renato 7'; Kanouté 45'; Maresca 89' (pen.)

Stade Louis II, Monaco
Attendance: 17,480
Referee: Stefano Farina (Italy)

Barcelona	Sevilla

GK	1	(Spain) Víctor Valdés
RB	2	(Brazil) Juliano Belletti
CB	4	(Mexico) Rafael Márquez
CB	5	(Spain) Carles Puyol (c)
LB	16	(Brazil) Sylvinho	(yellow card) 47'	(substituted off) 72'
CM	20	(Portugal) Deco
CM	6	(Spain) Xavi		(substituted off) 57'
CM	3	(Brazil) Thiago Motta		(substituted off) 57'
RW	19	(Argentina) Lionel Messi
LW	10	(Brazil) Ronaldinho
CF	9	(Cameroon) Samuel Eto'o
Substitutes:
GK	25	(Spain) Albert Jorquera
DF	11	(Italy) Gianluca Zambrotta
DF	21	(France) Lilian Thuram
DF	23	(Spain) Oleguer Presas
MF	8	(France) Ludovic Giuly		(substituted on) 72'
MF	24	(Spain) Andrés Iniesta		(substituted on) 57'
FW	7	(Iceland) Eiður Guðjohnsen		(substituted on) 57'
Manager:
(Netherlands) Frank Rijkaard

GK	1	(Spain) Andrés Palop	(yellow card) 77'
RB	4	(Brazil) Dani Alves	(yellow card) 54'
CB	2	(Spain) Javi Navarro (c)	(yellow card) 60'
CB	14	(France) Julien Escudé	(yellow card) 85'
LB	3	(Spain) David Castedo
RM	15	(Spain) Jesús Navas		(substituted off) 75'
CM	8	(Denmark) Christian Poulsen
CM	11	(Brazil) Renato
LM	6	(Brazil) Adriano		(substituted off) 81'
CF	12	(Mali) Frédéric Kanouté	(yellow card) 49'
CF	10	(Brazil) Luís Fabiano		(substituted off) 46'
Substitutes:
GK	13	(Spain) David Cobeño
DF	19	(Serbia) Ivica Dragutinović
DF	24	(Germany) Andreas Hinkel
MF	16	(Spain) Antonio Puerta		(substituted on) 81'
MF	18	(Spain) José Luis Martí		(substituted on) 46'
MF	25	(Italy) Enzo Maresca	(yellow card) 90'	(substituted on) 75'
FW	7	(Uruguay) Javier Chevantón
Manager:
(Spain) Juande Ramos

Man of the Match:
Dani Alves (Sevilla)

Assistant referees:
Marco Ivaldi (Italy)
Alessandro Griselli (Italy)
Fourth official:
Matteo Trefoloni (Italy)

=== Statistics ===
First half
Statistic	Barcelona	Sevilla
Goals scored	0	2
Total shots	5	7
Shots on target	2	5
Saves	3	2
Ball possession	63%	37%
Corner kicks	2	1
Fouls committed	9	13
Offsides	1	1
Yellow cards	0	0
Red cards	0	0

Second half
Statistic	Barcelona	Sevilla
Goals scored	0	1
Total shots	10	5
Shots on target	2	4
Saves	3	2
Ball possession	57%	43%
Corner kicks	1	3
Fouls committed	15	9
Offsides	1	3
Yellow cards	1	6
Red cards	0	0

Overall
Statistic	Barcelona	Sevilla
Goals scored	0	3
Total shots	15	12
Shots on target	4	9
Saves	6	4
Ball possession	60%	40%
Corner kicks	3	4
Fouls committed	24	22
Offsides	2	4
Yellow cards	1	6
Red cards	0	0

== See also ==
- 2006–07 UEFA Champions League
- 2006–07 UEFA Cup
- 2006–07 FC Barcelona season
- 2006–07 Sevilla FC season
- 2015 UEFA Super Cup – contested between same teams
- FC Barcelona in international football
- Sevilla FC in European football
- Spanish football clubs in international competitions
