= Aitor Ocio =

Spanish retired footballer (born 1976)

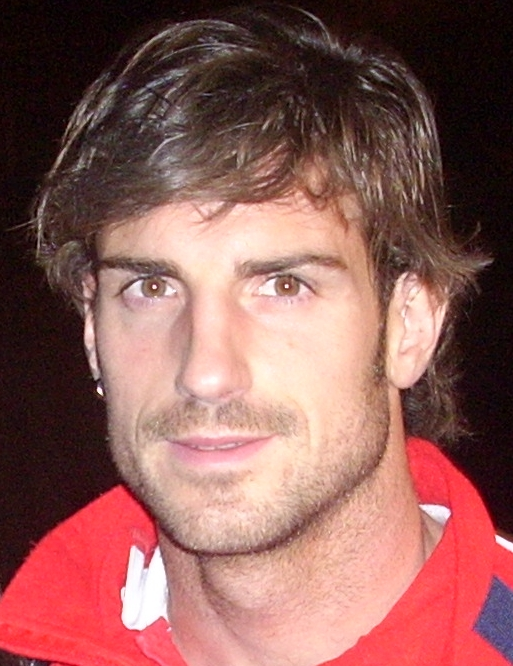
- Ocio as an Athletic Bilbao player (2008)

Personal information
- Full name: Aitor Ocio Carrión
- Date of birth: 28 November 1976 (age 49)
- Place of birth: Vitoria, Spain
- Height: 1.87 m (6 ft 2 in)
- Position: Centre-back

Youth career
- Alavés

Senior career*
Years	Team	Apps	(Gls)
1994–1998	Aurrerá	65	(3)
1998–2003	Athletic Bilbao	33	(1)
1998–1999	→ Eibar (loan)	29	(0)
1999–2000	→ Albacete (loan)	34	(0)
2000–2001	→ Osasuna (loan)	14	(0)
2003–2007	Sevilla	64	(3)
2007–2012	Athletic Bilbao	62	(1)
Total		301	(8)

International career
1992	Spain U16	5	(0)
- * Club domestic league appearances and goals

Aitor Ocio Carrión (born 28 November 1976) is a Spanish former professional footballer who played as a central defender.

In an 18-year senior career, in which he amassed La Liga totals of 173 matches and five goals, he played mainly for Athletic Bilbao (seven years, two spells) and Sevilla (four), winning three major titles with the latter club, including two UEFA Cups.

== Club career ==
Born in Vitoria-Gasteiz, Álava, Ocio made his debut in La Liga with CA Osasuna during the 2000–01 season, after Segunda División spells with SD Eibar and Albacete Balompié. He then came to prominence with Athletic Bilbao, who had loaned him to all three clubs.

Ocio joined Sevilla FC in summer 2003 on a three-year deal, going on to play a somewhat important part on a squad that won four titles (one Copa del Rey, two UEFA Cups and one UEFA Super Cup) in two seasons. During his four-year spell he was the Andalusian's vice-captain behind Javi Navarro, and had a best personal output of 23 games and two goals in the 2005–06 campaign.

In mid-July 2007, Ocio returned to Bilbao, playing 27 matches in his first season as the Basque side finished mid-table. He produced similar numbers in the following, adding a rare goal at former club Osasuna albeit in a 2–1 away defeat in which he was also sent off, one of five ejections he totalled in his first two years.

Ocio also began 2009–10 in the starting XI. However, after an injury suffered in early October 2009, he missed the rest of the season, with Athletic finishing eighth, adding just five competitive appearances the following year also due to persistent physical problems but renewing his contract on 23 May 2011.

35-year-old Ocio was deemed surplus to requirements at Athletic in the 2011–12 season after the appointment of manager Marcelo Bielsa, alongside teammates Koikili and Iban Zubiaurre. He remained with the team, however.

On 14 June 2012, Ocio announced his retirement from football.

== Personal life ==
Ocio had a relationship with model Laura Sánchez, with whom he had a daughter, Naia, born on 1 August 2006.

== Honours ==
Sevilla

- Copa del Rey: 2006–07
- UEFA Cup: 2005–06, 2006–07

Athletic Bilbao

- Copa del Rey runner-up: 2008–09
- Supercopa de España runner-up: 2009
