= Ivica Dragutinović =

Serbian footballer (born 1975)

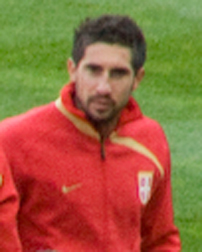
- Dragutinović in 2008

Personal information
- Full name: Ivica Dragutinović
- Date of birth: 13 November 1975 (age 50)
- Place of birth: Prijepolje, SR Serbia, SFR Yugoslavia
- Height: 1.85 m (6 ft 1 in)
- Position: Defender

Senior career*
Years	Team	Apps	(Gls)
1991–1992	Polimlje	17	(1)
1992–1993	Bor	25	(1)
1993–1996	Borac Čačak	56	(3)
1996–2000	AA Gent	84	(11)
2000–2005	Standard Liège	135	(3)
2005–2011	Sevilla	105	(5)
Total		422	(24)

International career
2000–2010	FRY / SCG / Serbia (Note: The Serbia national football team inherited Yugoslavia's spot within FIFA and UEFA and is considered by both organizations as the only successor of Yugoslavia (and of Serbia and Montenegro).)	49	(0)
- * Club domestic league appearances and goals

Ivica Dragutinović (Serbian Cyrillic: Ивица Драгутиновић, pronounced [îʋitsa draɡutǐːnoʋitɕ]; born 13 November 1975) is a Serbian former professional footballer. Mainly a central defender, he could also operate as a defensive left back.

After nearly one decade in Belgium, mainly with Standard Liége, he went on to form part of the Sevilla squads that won six major titles in the 2000s.

The recipient of 49 caps, Dragutinović represented Serbia and Montenegro at the 2006 World Cup.

== Club career ==
=== Early years and Belgium ===
Born in Prijepolje, Dragutinović started playing football with hometown team FK Polimlje. He joined Second League of FR Yugoslavia club FK Bor in the summer of 1992. After one season, Dragutinović moved to fellow Second League club FK Borac Čačak, helping them win the league and promotion to the First League of FR Yugoslavia. He made 56 appearances and scored three goals in the top flight (1994–1996), before heading to Belgium in 1996 and spending the following nine years there with K.A.A. Gent and Standard Liège, appearing in 219 First Division A games in the process.

Dragutinović was an overwhelming success after his arrival in Liège, having played over 200 official matches for the club. He still started 2005–06 with Standard but, on the last day of the August transfer window, signed with Sevilla FC on a 3+1 contract as an immediate replacement for Real Madrid-bound Sergio Ramos.

=== Sevilla ===
Dragutinović saw regular playing time during his first three seasons, appearing in the middle or the left flank of the back four and scoring once in every campaign as the team won, amongst other trophies, back-to-back UEFA Cups (he took part in a combined 18 matches in those conquests, including the 2007 final against RCD Espanyol). He already held a Belgian passport, thus not being included in the three non-EU player quota of La Liga.

On 2 August 2007, Spanish sports paper Marca claimed that Dragutinović had agreed to join Newcastle United of the Premier League. On 5 November, however, he put pen to paper on a new four-year deal. Still in that month, on the 25th, he was first to rush to the aid of collapsed teammate Antonio Puerta during the match against Getafe CF, due to a heart attack, arguably prolonging his life by keeping him from swallowing his tongue; Puerta eventually died in the hospital, three days later.

On 24 November 2009, Dragutinović scored an own goal during Sevilla's 0–1 defeat to FC Unirea Urziceni for the season's UEFA Champions League. It was his second at Stadionul Steaua, as he had already had the dubious honour in a match against ground owners FC Steaua București, in the UEFA Cup.

Dragutinović appeared in 20 matches in the 2009–10 season, as Sevilla finished fourth. On 20 February 2010, he netted through an unstoppable curl in a 3–1 victory at RCD Mallorca, precisely the team they edged for the final Champions League berth.

Following a severe injury, Dragutinović's first appearance in 2010–11 only took place on 11 May 2011: he entered the pitch in the last ten minutes of an away fixture against CA Osasuna, with the Andalusians leading 2–0 only to lose 2–3. On 26 May 2011, the 35-year-old – often referred to as just Drago during his stint – confirmed he was leaving the Ramón Sánchez Pizjuán Stadium.

== International career ==
Dragutinović made his debut for the Yugoslavia national team on 13 December 2000, in a friendly against Greece that ended 1–1. During the country's successful 2006 FIFA World Cup qualifying campaign he, alongside Goran Gavrančić, Nemanja Vidić and Mladen Krstajić, formed the "Famous Four" defence that only allowed one goal (from Spain's Raúl); during the final stages he only appeared in the group stage 0–1 loss to the Netherlands, as the nation conceded ten and lost all matches in Germany.

On 12 September 2007, in the dying minutes of a UEFA Euro 2008 qualifier in Portugal, Dragutinović was involved in an altercation with opposing manager Luiz Felipe Scolari, whom eventually punched the defender. They were handed four and two-match bans, respectively, as Serbia finished third in their group and failed to qualify.

Dragutinović was again called up for the 2010 World Cup qualifying campaign, playing six out of ten matches and helping the newly reformed Serbia to their first FIFA World Cup. After an achilles tendon injury sustained in training for Sevilla, however, he was ruled out of the finals in South Africa.

== Career statistics ==
=== International ===
Appearances and goals by national team and year
National team	Year	Apps	Goals
FR Yugoslavia; Serbia and Montenegro; Serbia	2000	1	0
FR Yugoslavia; Serbia and Montenegro; Serbia	2001	0	0
FR Yugoslavia; Serbia and Montenegro; Serbia	2002	8	0
FR Yugoslavia; Serbia and Montenegro; Serbia	2003	3	0
FR Yugoslavia; Serbia and Montenegro; Serbia	2004	7	0
FR Yugoslavia; Serbia and Montenegro; Serbia	2005	6	0
FR Yugoslavia; Serbia and Montenegro; Serbia	2006	6	0
FR Yugoslavia; Serbia and Montenegro; Serbia	2007	6	0
FR Yugoslavia; Serbia and Montenegro; Serbia	2008	5	0
FR Yugoslavia; Serbia and Montenegro; Serbia	2009	6	0
FR Yugoslavia; Serbia and Montenegro; Serbia	2010	1	0
Total		49	0

== Honours ==
Sevilla

- Copa del Rey: 2006–07, 2009–10
- Supercopa de España: 2007
- UEFA Cup: 2005–06, 2006–07
- UEFA Super Cup: 2006; Runner-up 2007
