= Kepa Blanco =

Spanish footballer

Kepa
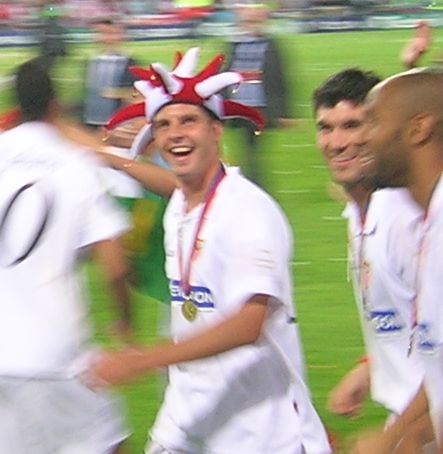
- Kepa after winning the 2006 UEFA Cup with Sevilla

Personal information
- Full name: Kepa Blanco González
- Date of birth: 13 January 1984 (age 42)
- Place of birth: Marbella, Spain
- Height: 1.85 m (6 ft 1 in)
- Position: Striker

Youth career
- 2001–2002: Sevilla

Senior career*
Years	Team	Apps	(Gls)
2002–2005	Sevilla B	88	(36)
2002–2007	Sevilla	37	(9)
2007	→ West Ham United (loan)	8	(1)
2007–2010	Getafe	24	(2)
2010–2012	Recreativo	19	(2)
2012–2013	Guadalajara	18	(4)
Total		194	(54)

International career
2003	Spain U19	3	(1)
2005–2006	Spain U21	8	(2)
2005	Spain U23	4	(2)

Managerial career
- 2014–2015: San Pedro (assistant)
- 2015–2016: San Pedro
- * Club domestic league appearances and goals

Kepa Blanco González (born 13 January 1984), known simply as Kepa, is a Spanish former professional footballer who played as a striker.

He was best known for his spell with Sevilla, for whom he appeared in 58 competitive games and scored 14 goals, winning three major titles including two UEFA Cups. In La Liga he also represented Getafe, achieving totals of 61 matches and 11 goals over six seasons.

== Club career ==
Kepa was born in Marbella, Province of Málaga; his forename was of Basque origin, as his mother hailed from Biscay. Brought up through the ranks of Sevilla FC, he played two La Liga matches with the first team in 2004–05, and established himself as an important attacking player with the Andalusian club in the following two seasons, but almost exclusively as a substitute.

In 2006–07, even after having scored a hat-trick against Levante UD in the league opener, and another three goals in the victorious run in the UEFA Cup, Kepa fell out of favour, and on 22 January 2007 he went on loan to West Ham United in the Premier League until the end of the campaign, with the option of a permanent transfer available. On his debut for the Hammers, eight days later, he netted in the 77th minute after only being on for 70 seconds with his first touch of the game against Liverpool.

Kepa signed a four-year deal with fellow top-flight club Getafe CF in July 2007, with Sevilla retaining the option of repurchasing the next season or the one after that. He appeared sparingly for the UEFA Cup quarter-finalists in his first year, scoring in a 2–0 home win over Real Murcia CF after coming from the bench on 21 October but also being sent off for kicking an opponent; from that moment onwards he was rarely featured, not even in the Copa del Rey (nine league matches over two full seasons).

On 5 August 2010, Kepa was sold to Recreativo de Huelva of the Segunda División as Adrián Colunga moved in the opposite direction. He made only 19 appearances out of a possible 42 in his first year, being released from contract in April 2012 after no competitive minutes during the campaign whatsoever.

In 2014, after one season in the second tier with CD Guadalajara, where he totalled 19 games and also suffered relegation, and one year of inactivity, the 30-year-old Kepa retired from football, being appointed assistant coach at amateurs UD San Pedro in his native region shortly after.

== International career ==
Kepa scored twice for the Spain under-21 team in the 2007 UEFA European Championship qualifiers, in victories over Albania (3–0) and Slovakia (4–2). They eventually lost in the play-offs to Italy 2–1 on aggregate.

== Honours ==
Sevilla

- Copa del Rey: 2006–07
- UEFA Cup: 2005–06, 2006–07

Spain U23

- Mediterranean Games: 2005
