= Andrés Palop =

Spanish footballer and manager (born 1973)

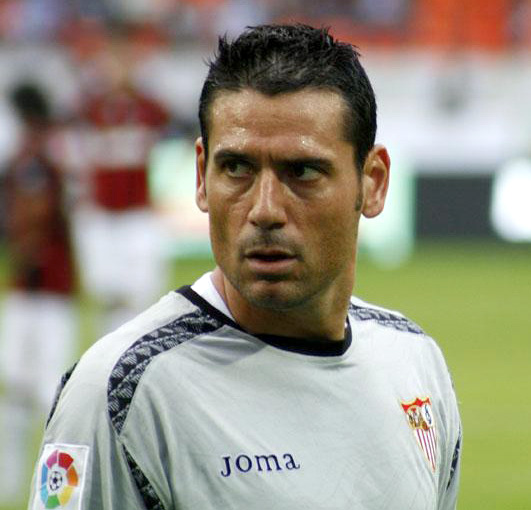
- Palop with Sevilla in 2008

Personal information
- Full name: Andrés Palop Cervera
- Date of birth: 22 October 1973 (age 53)
- Place of birth: L'Alcúdia, Spain
- Height: 1.84 m (6 ft 0 in)
- Position: Goalkeeper

Youth career
- Valencia

Senior career*
Years	Team	Apps	(Gls)
1993–1997	Valencia B	68	(0)
1993–1994	→ Oliva (loan)		
1994–1995	→ Gimnástico (loan)		
1997–2005	Valencia	43	(0)
1997–1999	→ Villarreal (loan)	74	(0)
2005–2013	Sevilla	217	(0)
2013–2014	Bayer Leverkusen	0	(0)
Total		402+	(0)

Managerial career
- 2015–2016: Alcoyano
- 2018–2019: Ibiza
Medal record
Representing Spain
UEFA European Championship
Winner	2008 Austria-Switzerland
- * Club domestic league appearances and goals

Andrés Palop Cervera (Valencian pronunciation: [anˈdɾes paˈlob]; born 22 October 1973) is a Spanish former professional footballer who played as a goalkeeper.

After having languished on the bench of hometown club Valencia for most of his stay, he became a premiere player with Sevilla well into his 30s, helping it consolidate in both the domestic and European fronts. Over 15 seasons, he appeared in 295 matches in La Liga, where he also represented Villarreal in 1998–99.

Palop was selected by Spain for Euro 2008, but never earned an international cap. After retiring, he worked briefly as a manager.

== Club career ==
=== Valencia ===
Born in L'Alcúdia, Valencian Community, Palop was a youth product of local giants Valencia, and his first professional seasons were spent at neighbours Villarreal in a two-year loan spell. He was the undisputed starter in both the side's La Liga promotion in 1998 – a first ever– and relegation the following season, being subsequently recalled.

In his six-year stint, however, Palop was mostly backup to veteran Santiago Cañizares, his most games consisting of 15 in his first year. As the club was crowned league champion in 2002 and 2004, he could only make seven appearances (all in the former campaign), and eventually grew unsettled; he was also part of the squad that won the 2003–04 UEFA Cup in Gothenburg.

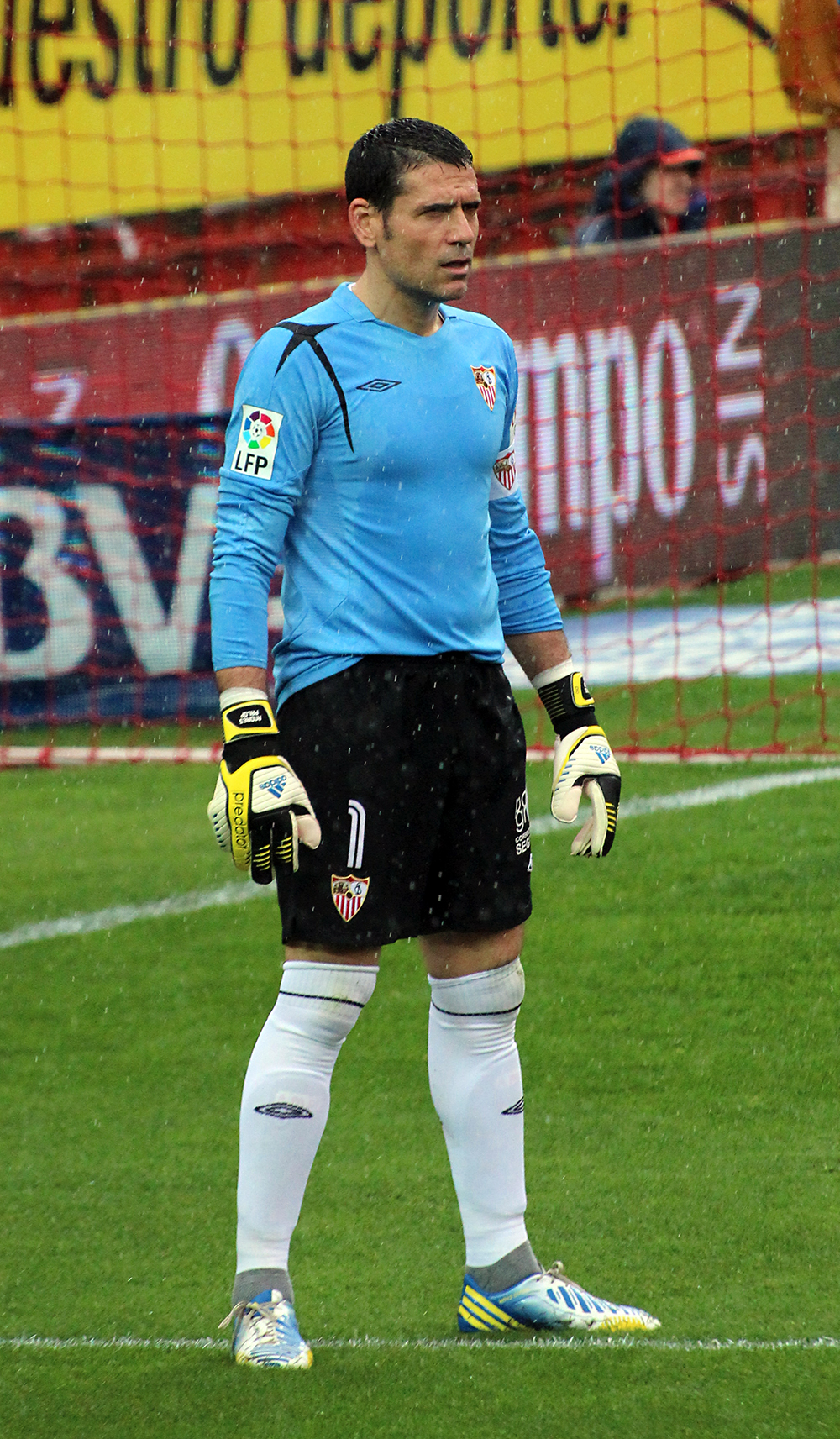
Palop in action for Sevilla in 2013

=== Sevilla ===
Palop signed a four-year contract with Sevilla in June 2005 with a €30 million buyout clause, quickly becoming one of the Andalusians' cornerstones as they claimed five titles in only one year. On 15 March 2007, he made headlines when he scored an injury time-equalising goal in the UEFA Cup round-of-16 tie against Shakhtar Donetsk, forcing extra time as a result; his team, who had drawn 2–2 at home in the first leg, went on to win 3–2 and eventually the competition for the second consecutive time. In the final, he stopped three of four penalty kicks in the shootout, being named Player of the match to defeat fellow Spaniards Espanyol.

In the following campaigns, veteran Palop continued to be first choice, never appearing in fewer than 31 league matches. In 2009–10, he helped to a fourth place in the league, with the subsequent qualification for the UEFA Champions League, and victory in the Copa del Rey.

=== Bayer Leverkusen ===
On 3 June 2013, Palop joined Bayer Leverkusen on a one-year deal, moving abroad for the first time at the age of nearly 40. He remained unused by the German Bundesliga club and, in April 2014, announced his retirement.

== International career ==
Palop was first called up for Spain in August 2007 for a friendly with Greece, after a last-minute injury to Iker Casillas. However, he did not leave the bench.

Uncapped, Palop lost a narrow competition with Pepe Reina of Liverpool for second choice at UEFA Euro 2008, but beat Barcelona's Víctor Valdés for the third spot on the squad. During the ceremony following Spain's victory in the tournament, he wore Luis Arconada's original Euro 1984 final shirt; he received the gold medal from Michel Platini (who had won the 1984 continental competition, opening the score from an Arconada blunder), later president of UEFA.

== Coaching career ==
On 18 February 2015, Palop was named manager at Alcoyano for the remainder of the season in the Segunda División B. In June, after achieving the sufficient qualifications, he took the post on a permanent basis, announcing his exit in May 2016.

Palop was appointed as the new head coach of Ibiza on 27 September 2018, with that club also competing in the third tier. He was dismissed the following 25 February having won ten of his 21 games, leaving the team eight points from a playoff place.

In April 2020, Palop was hospitalised for 12 days during the coronavirus pandemic. Two years later, he was UEFA's ambassador for the Europa League Final at the Ramón Sánchez-Pizjuán Stadium in Seville.

== Style of play ==
Palop was mainly known for his shot-stopping abilities, and also earned a reputation as a penalty-saving specialist throughout his career.

== Career statistics ==
Appearances and goals by club, season and competition
Club	Season	League			National cup (Note: Includes Copa del Rey and DFB-Pokal)		Continental		Other		Total	
Club	Season	Division	Apps	Goals	Apps	Goals	Apps	Goals	Apps	Goals	Apps	Goals
Valencia	1997–98	La Liga	0	0	0	0	—		—		0	0
Valencia	1999–00	La Liga	15	0	0	0	6 (Note: Appearances in UEFA Champions League)	0	—		21	0
Valencia	2000–01	La Liga	1	0	2	0	1	0	—		4	0
Valencia	2001–02	La Liga	7	0	0	0	3 (Note: Appearances in UEFA Europa League)	0	—		10	0
Valencia	2002–03	La Liga	9	0	2	0	3	0	—		14	0
Valencia	2003–04	La Liga	0	0	6	0	6	0	—		12	0
Valencia	2004–05	La Liga	11	0	1	0	2	0	—		14	0
Valencia	Total		43	0	11	0	21	0	—		75	0
Villarreal (loan)	1997–98	Segunda División	39	0	0	0	—		2 (Note: Appearances in promotion play-offs)	0	41	0
Villarreal (loan)	1998–99	La Liga	35	0	5	0	—		2 (Note: Appearances in relegation play-offs)	0	42	0
Villarreal (loan)	Total		74	0	5	0	—		4	0	83	0
Sevilla	2005–06	La Liga	36	0	0	0	7	0	—		43	0
Sevilla	2006–07	La Liga	34	0	4	0	12	1	1 (Note: Appearance in UEFA Super Cup)	0	51	1
Sevilla	2007–08	La Liga	31	0	0	0	9	0	3 (Note: Appearances in Supercopa de España)	0	43	0
Sevilla	2008–09	La Liga	35	0	6	0	6	0	—		47	0
Sevilla	2009–10	La Liga	33	0	6	0	5	0	—		44	0
Sevilla	2010–11	La Liga	19	0	3	0	8	0	2	0	32	0
Sevilla	2011–12	La Liga	13	0	1	0	2	0	—		16	0
Sevilla	2012–13	La Liga	16	0	3	0	—		—		19	0
Sevilla	Total		217	0	23	0	49	1	6	0	295	1
Bayer Leverkusen	2013–14	Bundesliga	0	0	0	0	0	0	—		0	0
Career total			334	0	39	0	70	1	10	0	453	1

== Managerial statistics ==
As of 24 February 2019

Managerial record by team and tenure
Team	Nat	From	To	Record								Ref
Team	Nat	From	To	G	W	D	L	GF	GA	GD	Win %	Ref
Alcoyano	(Spain)	18 February 2015	20 May 2016	52	24	14	14	63	48	+15	46.15	
Ibiza	(Spain)	27 September 2018	25 February 2019	21	10	6	5	24	18	+6	47.62	
Total				73	34	20	19	87	66	+21	46.58	—

== Honours ==
Valencia

- La Liga: 2001–02
- UEFA Cup: 2003–04
- UEFA Super Cup: 2004
- UEFA Champions League runner-up: 2000–01

Sevilla

- Copa del Rey: 2006–07, 2009–10
- Supercopa de España: 2007; runner-up: 2010
- UEFA Cup: 2005–06, 2006–07
- UEFA Super Cup: 2006; runner-up: 2007

Spain

- UEFA European Championship: 2008
