= José Luis Martí =

Spanish footballer and manager

Personal information
- Full name: José Luis Martí Soler
- Date of birth: 28 April 1975 (age 51)
- Place of birth: Palma, Spain
- Height: 1.80 m (5 ft 11 in)
- Position: Midfielder

Youth career
- Mallorca

Senior career*
Years	Team	Apps	(Gls)
1994–1999	Mallorca B	124	(6)
1999–2000	Mallorca	1	(0)
2000–2003	Tenerife	113	(6)
2003–2008	Sevilla	140	(4)
2008	→ Real Sociedad (loan)	22	(2)
2008–2015	Mallorca	191	(5)
Total		591	(17)

Managerial career
- 2015–2018: Tenerife
- 2019: Deportivo La Coruña
- 2019–2020: Girona
- 2020–2021: Leganés
- 2022: Sporting Gijón
- 2024: Ibiza
- * Club domestic league appearances and goals

José Luis Martí Soler (born 28 April 1975) is a Spanish former professional footballer who played as a central midfielder, currently a manager.

Known for his tactical awareness, he amassed La Liga totals of 336 matches and eight goals over 13 seasons, representing Mallorca (two spells), Tenerife and Sevilla. He won five major titles with the latter club, including two UEFA Cups.

Martí started working as a manager in 2015, going on to spend three seasons in Segunda División with Tenerife and one apiece in the same tier with Deportivo, Girona, Leganés and Sporting de Gijón.

== Playing career ==
=== Early years and Tenerife ===
Martí was born in Palma de Mallorca. Having starting playing professionally with hometown's Mallorca, making his first-team debut at the age of already 25 in the 1999–2000 season (one game, one minute against Alavés after coming on as a substitute for Samuel Eto'o), he switched the following campaign to the Canary Islands, joining Tenerife in the Segunda División and being instrumental in the team's promotion to La Liga.

=== Sevilla ===
After Tenerife's top-division relegation, Martí played one more season with the club, then returned to the top flight as he joined Sevilla in July 2003, going on to become a regular in the Andalusia side's exploits in the subsequent years – for instance, as they won back-to-back UEFA Cups, he totalled 24 appearances scoring two goals, both through penalties.

In May 2007, Martí extended his contract with Sevilla until 2010. However, having lost his importance in 2007–08 under Manolo Jiménez, he was loaned to Real Sociedad in January 2008; the Basques ultimately failed to return to the top tier after finishing fourth, with him as first-choice.

=== Mallorca ===
The 33-year-old Martí returned to Mallorca in July 2008, for about €500.000, being an undisputed starter in the first year upon his return and the following, when the Balearic Islands side were edged in the last matchday for the final berth for the UEFA Champions League, precisely by his former club Sevilla. Again from the penalty spot, he netted his only goal of the season at Sporting de Gijón on 4 October 2009 (4–1 defeat).

Martí renewed his contract on 29 June 2011, until the following year. Still first choice, the captain saw the team be relegated to the second division in 2013, the first time in 16 years.

One month after his 40th birthday, Martí announced he would retire from football at the end of the 2014–15 campaign, with Mallorca still in the second tier.

== Coaching career ==
Martí was appointed manager of Tenerife on 4 November 2015, replacing the fired Raül Agné. He was himself relieved of his duties on 4 February 2018 after four league games without a win, totalling 39 wins, 40 draws and 29 defeats during his spell.

On 8 April 2019, after more than a year without a club, Martí signed for Deportivo de La Coruña in place of Natxo González who had been dismissed a day earlier. In late June, after leading the team to the sixth position in the regular season and falling short in the promotion play-offs, he left.

On 28 October 2019, Martí took over from Juan Carlos Unzué at the helm of Girona also in the second division. He was shown the door the following 30 June, with the side fifth and therefore in the playoffs.

Martí remained in the second tier in August 2020, taking the reins of Leganés who had recently been relegated. He was sacked on 26 January 2021, after a five-match winless streak.

On 23 February 2022, Martí replaced David Gallego at the helm of Sporting Gijón, still in the second division. On 3 May, after just one victory in ten games, he was dismissed.

On 27 June 2024, after two years of inactivity, Martí was named manager of Primera Federación club Ibiza. On 11 November, following three consecutive losses, he was relieved of his duties.

== Managerial statistics ==
As of match played 10 November 2024

Managerial record by team and tenure
Team	Nat	From	To	Record								Ref
Team	Nat	From	To	G	W	D	L	GF	GA	GD	Win %	Ref
Tenerife	(Spain)	4 November 2015	4 February 2018	108	39	40	29	126	106	+20	36.11	
Deportivo La Coruña	(Spain)	8 April 2019	27 June 2019	13	7	2	4	16	12	+4	53.85	
Girona	(Spain)	28 October 2019	30 June 2020	26	11	8	7	33	28	+5	42.31	
Leganés	(Spain)	3 August 2020	26 January 2021	24	12	4	8	24	17	+7	50.00	
Sporting Gijón	(Spain)	23 February 2022	3 May 2022	10	1	3	6	9	12	−3	10.00	
Ibiza	(Spain)	27 June 2024	11 November 2024	12	4	4	4	8	9	−1	33.33	
Career total				193	74	61	58	216	184	+32	38.34	—

== Honours ==
Sevilla

- Copa del Rey: 2006–07
- Supercopa de España: 2007
- UEFA Cup: 2005–06, 2006–07
- UEFA Super Cup: 2006; runner-up 2007
