= Javi Navarro (footballer, born 1974) =

Spanish footballer

Personal information
- Full name: Francisco Javier Vicente Navarro
- Date of birth: 6 February 1974 (age 52)
- Place of birth: Valencia, Spain
- Height: 1.82 m (6 ft 0 in)
- Position: Centre-back

Youth career
- Valencia

Senior career*
Years	Team	Apps	(Gls)
1993–2000	Valencia B	53	(0)
1994–2001	Valencia	41	(0)
1994–1995	→ Logroñés (loan)	15	(0)
2000–2001	→ Elche (loan)	34	(0)
2001–2009	Sevilla	168	(3)
Total		311	(3)

International career
1990	Spain U16	5	(0)
1990	Spain U17	7	(0)
1990–1991	Spain U18	9	(0)
1993	Spain U20	3	(0)
1996	Spain U21	2	(0)
1996	Spain U23	3	(0)
2006–2007	Spain	4	(0)

Managerial career
- 2010–2012: Sevilla (assistant)
Medal record
Men's football
Representing Spain
UEFA European Under-21 Championship
Runner-up	1996 Spain
- * Club domestic league appearances and goals

Francisco Javier "Javi" Vicente Navarro (born 6 February 1974) is a Spanish former professional footballer.

During his career, the central defender represented mainly Valencia and Sevilla, achieving great success with the latter club – five major titles, including two UEFA Cups. Over 15 seasons, greatly hindered by injuries, he amassed La Liga totals of 224 matches and three goals.

Navarro played four times for Spain, making his debut in 2006.

== Club career ==
=== Valencia ===
Navarro was born in Valencia. A product of hometown club Valencia CF's youth system, he made his first-team debut during the 1993–94 season – four La Liga appearances – and, after a loan stint with CD Logroñés also in the top flight, returned for 1995–96, playing 19 matches as the side finished runners-up.

Navarro suffered a serious knee injury in late 1996, being out of action almost three years and then loaned to neighbours Elche CF for 2000–01 upon his recovery.

=== Sevilla ===
After that single campaign in the Segunda División, in July 2001 Navarro signed for Sevilla FC, where he proceeded to form a formidable centre-back partnership with Pablo Alfaro the next five years. He scored his first goal in the top flight on 15 June 2003, but in a 3–2 away loss against Málaga CF. On 20 March 2005, he brutally impacted with his elbow on RCD Mallorca's Juan Arango, leaving the Venezuelan unconscious on the pitch.

After being one of Sevilla's most important players throughout the team's conquests from 2005 to 2007 (two UEFA Cups, one UEFA Super Cup and one Copa del Rey), Navarro spent two years on the sidelines with another severe knee injury. He eventually retired from the game at the end of the 2008–09 season, aged 35.

Navarro returned to Sevilla in late June 2010, being named manager Antonio Álvarez's assistant.

== International career ==
At the age of 32 years and nine months, Navarro earned his first cap for Spain in a friendly 0–1 loss against Romania on 15 November 2006 in Cádiz, becoming the third-oldest debutant for the national team after Ferenc Puskás (34) and Vicente Engonga (32 and 11 months).

Previously, he appeared with the nation at the 1996 Summer Olympics, reaching the quarter-finals.

== Honours ==
Sevilla

- Copa del Rey: 2006–07
- UEFA Cup: 2005–06, 2006–07
- UEFA Super Cup: 2006

Spain U21

- UEFA European Under-21 Championship runner-up: 1996
