= 2006–07 Copa del Rey =

105th Copa del Rey

Tournament details
- Country: Spain

Final positions
- Champions: Sevilla (4th title)
- Runners-up: Getafe

Tournament statistics
- Top goal scorer(s): Javier Saviola (7 goals)

The 2006–07 Copa del Rey was the 105th staging of the Copa del Rey.

The competition started on 30 August 2006 and concluded on 23 June 2007 with the Final, held at the Santiago Bernabéu in Madrid, in which Sevilla lifted the trophy for the first time since 1948 with a 1–0 victory over Getafe.

== First round ==
30 August 2006
CD Lugo	2–0	Gimnástica de Torrelavega
Santa Eulàlia	2–1	CD Eldense
Alicante CF	0–1	UE Lleida
Badalona	2–0	Villajoyosa CF
Benidorm CD	1–0	UDA Gramenet
Girona FC	0–4	Orihuela CF
Granada CF	1–2	Racing Club Portuense
Sestao River Club	0–1	Burgos CF
SD Eibar	2–1	Real Oviedo
Rayo Vallecano	4–1	Pontevedra CF
Universidad de Las Palmas	0–0 (4–3 PP)	UD Fuerteventura
UD Puertollano	4–1 (AET)	AD Parla
Gimnástica Segoviana	2–0	Universidad de Oviedo
Real Unión	3–2	AD Fundación Logroñés
Peña Sport FC	2–1	UE Sant Andreu
UD Barbastro	0–0 (5–4 pp)	Terrassa FC
CD Linares	2–1	Córdoba CF
Écija Balompié	2–1	CF Villanovense

== Second round ==
20 September 2006
Eibar	1–0	Águilas
U. de Las Palmas	1–0	Santa Eulàlia
Lugo	0–0 (0–3 PP)	Rayo Vallecano
Alcoyano	2–1	Benidorm
Badalona	3–0	Racing de Ferrol
Badajoz	1–5	Linares
Burgos	3–2	Orihuela
Peña Sport	2–0	Barbastro
Écija	3–0	Real Unión
Puertollano	0–0 (4–3 PP)	Lleida
Segoviana	3–1	Cartagena
Portuense	2–0	Fuenlabrada
Elche	1–0	Ponferradina
Lorca	0–1	Real Valladolid
Xerez	3–0	Albacete
Vecindario	0–1	Hércules
Numancia	1–1 (2–4 PP)	Polideportivo Ejido
Salamanca	0–1	Almería
Real Murcia	0–1	Las Palmas
Cádiz	3–2	Sporting de Gijón
Tenerife	1–2	Alavés
Málaga CF	2–1	Ciudad de Murcia

== Third round ==
4 October 2006
Écija	0–0 (5–4 PP)	Eibar
Badalona	1–1 (7–6 PP)	Universidad de Las Palmas
Rayo Vallecano	0–0 (5–4 PP)	Puertollano
Elche	0–1	Real Valladolid
Burgos	1–1 (2–2 AET, 5–6 PP)	Segoviana
Hércules	2–0	Las Palmas
Almería	0–0 (4–5 PP)	Málaga
Polideportivo Ejido	1–1 (4–5 PP)	Alavés
Castellón	1–0	Cádiz
Peña Sport	2–0	Alcoyano
Portuense	1–0 (AET)	Linares

== Knockout stages ==
- Team listed first were the home team in the first leg

Round of 32
Athletic Bilbao	1	1	2
Mallorca (AET)	1	2	3
Deportivo	1	0	1 (3)
Racing (PSO)	0	1	1 (1)
Real Valladolid	1	3	4
Gimnàstic de Tarragona	0	1	1
Castellón	0	0	0
Villarreal	2	2	4
Espanyol	1	0	1
Rayo Vallecano	1	1	2
Gimnástica Segoviana	0	0	0
Sevilla	1	3	4
Recreativo	0	0	0
Real Betis	0	2	2
Écija Balompié	1	1	2
Real Madrid	1	5	6
Deportivo Alavés	0	1	1
Celta Vigo	0	0	0
Badalona	1	0	1
Barcelona	2	4	6
Málaga	4	1	5
Real Sociedad	1	2	3
Hércules	1	0	1
Real Zaragoza	1	2	3
Xerez	0	2	2
Getafe	2	1	3
Portuense	1	0	1
Valencia	2	2	4
Peña Sport	0	0	0
Osasuna	0	4	4
Atlético Madrid	0	1	1 (4)
Levante (PSO)	1	0	1 (2)

Round of 16
Mallorca	1	1	2
Deportivo	2	1	3
Real Valladolid	2	1	3
Villarreal	1	0	1
Rayo Vallecano	0	1	1
Sevilla	0	3	3
Real Betis (AG)	0	1	1
Real Madrid	0	1	1
Deportivo Alavés	0	2	2
Barcelona	2	3	5
Málaga	0	1	1
Real Zaragoza	3	0	3
Getafe	1	4	5
Valencia	1	2	3
Atlético Madrid	1	0	1
Osasuna	1	2	3

Quarterfinals
Deportivo	4	1	5
Real Valladolid	1	1	2
Sevilla	0	1	1
Real Betis *	0	0	0
Barcelona (AG)	0	2	2
Real Zaragoza	1	1	2
Getafe	3	0	3
Osasuna	0	1	1

Semifinals
Deportivo	0	0	0
Sevilla	2	3	5
Barcelona	5	0	5
Getafe	2	4	6

Final
Sevilla	1
Getafe	0

* Match abandoned after 57 minutes at 0–1 due to injury of Sevilla coach Juande Ramos; remainder of the game played on 18 March at the Coliseum, Getafe.

== Round of 32 ==
Team 1	Agg.	Team 2	1st leg	2nd leg

== Round of 16 ==
Team 1	Agg.	Team 2	1st leg	2nd leg

== Quarter-finals ==
Team 1	Agg.	Team 2	1st leg	2nd leg

== Semi-finals ==
=== First leg ===
All times CEST.

18 April 2007
21:00

Barcelona	5–2	Getafe
Xavi 18'; Messi 29', 45'; Guðjohnsen 63'; Eto'o 74'	(Report)	Güiza 58'; Nacho 60'

Camp Nou, Barcelona

19 April 2007
21:00

Deportivo	0–3	Sevilla
	(Report)	Kanouté 12'; Navas 14'; Luís Fabiano 90+1' (pen.)

Riazor, A Coruña

=== Second leg ===
9 May 2007
21:00

Sevilla	2–0	Deportivo
Duda 3'; Chevantón 33'	(Report)

Estadio Ramón Sánchez Pizjuán, Seville

Sevilla beat 5–0 Deportivo on aggregate

10 May 2007
21:00

Getafe	4–0	Barcelona
Casquero 37'; Güiza 43', 73'; Dorado 70'	(Report)

Coliseum Alfonso Pérez, Madrid

Getafe beat 6–5 Barcelona on aggregate

== Final ==
23 June 2007
22:00 CEST

Sevilla	1–0	Getafe
Kanouté 11'	(Report)

Santiago Bernabéu, Madrid
Attendance: 80,000
Referee: Julián Rodríguez Santiago (Castile and León)

== Top goalscorers ==
Rank	Player	Club	Goals
1	(Argentina) Javier Saviola	Barcelona	7
2	(Spain) Daniel Güiza	Getafe	6
3	(Mali) Frédéric Kanouté	Sevilla	4
4	(Iceland) Eiður Guðjohnsen	Barcelona	3
4	(Spain) Iñigo Díaz de Cerio	Real Sociedad	3
4	(Turkey) Nihat Kahveci	Villarreal	3

== TV rights ==
- Spain – Telecinco
