= 2012–13 Sevilla FC season =

106th season in existence of Sevilla FC

Sevilla
2012–13 season
- President: José María del Nido
- Head coach: Míchel (until 14 January); Unai Emery (from 14 January)
- Stadium: Ramón Sánchez Pizjuán
- La Liga: 9th
- Copa del Rey: Semi-finals
- Top goalscorer: League: Álvaro Negredo (25); All: Álvaro Negredo (31)
| Home colours | Away colours | Third colours |

The 2012–13 season was Sevilla Football Club's 12th consecutive season in La Liga and its first season without participating in European competitions since 2004–05. The team manager in the previous season, Míchel, continued with the team.

== Transfers ==
=== In ===
(substituted on) In (6 players)
| Player | From | Fee |
|---|---|---|
| (Spain) Diego López | (Spain) Villarreal | €3,500,000 |
| (Netherlands) Hedwiges Maduro | (Spain) Valencia | Free |
| (Chile) Bryan Rabello | (Chile) Colo-Colo | Free |
| (France) Geoffrey Kondogbia | (France) Lens | €3,000,000 |
| (Brazil) Cicinho | (Brazil) Palmeiras | €2,000,000 |
| (Spain) Alberto Botía | (Spain) Sporting Gijón | €3,000,000 |

=== Out ===
(substituted off) Out (7 players)
| Player | New Team | Fee |
|---|---|---|
| (Uruguay) Martín Cáceres | (Italy) Juventus | €9,500,000 |
| (Ivory Coast) Arouna Koné | (Spain) Levante | Free |
| (Mali) Frédéric Kanouté | (China) Beijing Guoan | Free |
| (Argentina) Emiliano Armenteros | (Spain) Osasuna | Free |
| (France) Julien Escudé | (Turkey) Beşiktaş | Free |
| (Ivory Coast) Romaric | (Spain) Zaragoza | Free |
| (Belgium) Tom de Mul | Free agent | |

==== Loans out ====
(substituted off) Loan out (6 players)
| Player | Team |
|---|---|
| (Spain) Javi Varas | (Spain) Celta Vigo |
| (Spain) Alexis | (Spain) Getafe |
| (Italy) Tiberio Guarente | (Italy) Bologna |
| (Spain) Luis Alberto | (Spain) Barcelona B |
| (Argentina) Lautaro Acosta | (Argentina) Boca Juniors |
| (Japan) Hiroshi Ibusuki | (Belgium) Eupen |

==== Loan returns ====
(substituted on) Loan return (2 players)
Italics for players returning to the club but left it during pre-season
| Player | From |
| (Colombia) Bernardo | (Spain) Racing Santander |
| (Spain) Javi Hervás | (Spain) Córdoba |
| (Uruguay) Martín Cáceres | (Italy) Juventus |
| (Ivory Coast) Arouna Koné | (Spain) Levante |
| (Argentina) Emiliano Armenteros | (Spain) Rayo Vallecano |
| (Spain) Alexis | (Spain) Getafe |
| (Ivory Coast) Romaric | (Spain) Espanyol |
| (Argentina) Lautaro Acosta | (Spain) Racing Santander |

=== Promotion from youth system ===
(substituted on) Promotion from youth system (1 player)
Italics for players who were promoted from youth system but left the team during pre-season
| Player | Date of birth (Age) |
| (Spain) Álex Rubio | 23 July 1993 (aged 18) |
| (Japan) Hiroshi Ibusuki | 27 February 1991 (aged 21) |

== Winter transfers ==
=== In ===
(substituted on) In (1 player)
| Player | From | Fee |
|---|---|---|
| (Bosnia and Herzegovina) Miroslav Stevanović | (Serbia) Vojvodina | €1,000,000 |

=== Out ===
(substituted off) Out (1 player)
| Player | New Team | Fee |
|---|---|---|
| (Spain) Diego López | (Spain) Real Madrid | €4,000,000 |

=== Loan in ===
(substituted on) Loan in (1 player)
| Player | From |
|---|---|
| (Portugal) Beto | (Portugal) Braga |

=== Loan out ===
(substituted off) Loan out (2 players)
| Player | Team |
|---|---|
| (Colombia) Bernardo | (Spain) Sporting Gijón |
| (Spain) Antonio Luna | (Spain) Mallorca |

=== Promotion from youth system ===
(substituted on) Promotion from youth system (1 player)
Italics for players who were promoted from youth system but left the team during pre-season
| Player | Date of birth (Age) |
| (Spain) Julián Cuesta | 28 March 1991 (aged 21) |

== Players ==
=== Squad information ===
As of 30 January 2013

Note: Flags indicate national team as defined under FIFA eligibility rules; some limited exceptions apply. Players may hold more than one non-FIFA nationality.

| No. | Pos. | Nation | Player |
|---|---|---|---|
| 1 | GK | ESP | Andrés Palop (captain) |
| 2 | DF | ARG | Federico Fazio |
| 3 | DF | ESP | Fernando Navarro |
| 4 | DF | BIH | Emir Spahić |
| 5 | DF | ESP | Cala |
| 6 | MF | ESP | José Campaña |
| 7 | MF | ESP | Jesús Navas |
| 8 | MF | CHI | Gary Medel |
| 9 | FW | ESP | Álvaro Negredo |
| 10 | MF | ARG | Diego Perotti |
| 11 | MF | CRO | Ivan Rakitić |
| 12 | DF | NED | Hedwiges Maduro |
| 13 | GK | POR | Beto (On loan from Braga) |
| 14 | FW | ESP | Manu |

| No. | Pos. | Nation | Player |
|---|---|---|---|
| 15 | MF | GER | Piotr Trochowski |
| 17 | MF | ESP | Javi Hervás |
| 18 | MF | BIH | Miroslav Stevanović |
| 19 | MF | ESP | José Antonio Reyes |
| 20 | FW | SEN | Baba Diawara |
| 21 | DF | BRA | Cicinho |
| 22 | MF | FRA | Geoffrey Kondogbia |
| 23 | DF | ESP | Coke |
| 24 | DF | ESP | Alberto Botía |
| 28 | FW | ESP | Álex Rubio |
| 29 | GK | ESP | Julián Cuesta |
| 30 | MF | CHI | Bryan Rabello |

=== Youth system ===
Note: Flags indicate national team as defined under FIFA eligibility rules; some limited exceptions apply. Players may hold more than one non-FIFA nationality.

| No. | Pos. | Nation | Player |
|---|---|---|---|
| 26 | DF | ESP | Francisco Javier Atienza |
| 27 | MF | ESP | Jozabed |
| 31 | MF | ESP | Joaquín García |
| 32 | FW | ESP | Jonathan Diego Menéndez |
| 33 | MF | ESP | Antonio Jesús Cotán |
| 34 | DF | ESP | Israel Puerto |
| 35 | DF | ESP | Alberto Moreno |
| 36 | GK | ESP | Néstor Díaz |
| 37 | GK | ESP | Sergio Rico |

| No. | Pos. | Nation | Player |
|---|---|---|---|
| 38 | DF | ESP | Samu |
| 39 | MF | ENG | Alban Bunjaku |
| 40 | DF | ESP | Martí Tapia |
| 41 | FW | ESP | Gonzalo |
| – | MF | ESP | Salva Rivas |
| – | DF | ESP | Modesto Acosta |
| – | DF | ESP | Daniel Pérez |
| – | MF | ESP | Jesús Alfaro |

=== Long-term injuries ===
==== Congenital abnormality in Maduro's heart ====
Out between: July 2012 – September 2012

On 28 July, Sevilla announced that Hedwiges Maduro was suffering from a congenital anomaly in his heart. It was detected in a special examination by physicians during the second part of the team's summer concentration in Costa Ballena, near Rota. The club said days after that the player had traveled to Houston, Texas, for an examination and a full diagnosis. Maduro said after the first extensive revisions made in Spain that his life was not in danger. After being investigated in Houston by Dr. Paolo Angelini, Sevilla medical services made public that Maduro's abnormality would not prevent him from playing football professionally, and he could rejoin the squad as normal, in late August.

==== Trochowski's knee injury ====
Out between: September 2012 – May 2013

After scoring the first goal of the match against Barcelona on 29 September, Piotr Trochowski had to leave the match with a knee injury. Sevilla's medical services analyzed his illness during the following days. The treatment he received first failed, and doctors thought it was appropriate to operate him in late October in Denver, Colorado. After the surgery, the club told press that the time without playing would be eight months, figuring that his reappearance could be in May 2013, meaning he would miss the remainder of the season.

=== Called up by their national football team ===
List of players called up by their national team
Updated to 22 January 2013
| 4 | Emir Spahić | Bosnia and Herzegovina | v. Wales (15 August 2012) v. Liechtenstein (7 September 2012) v. Latvia (11 September 2012) v. Greece (12 October 2012) v. Lithuania (16 October 2012) v. Algeria (14 November 2012) |
| 7 | Jesús Navas | Spain | v. Puerto Rico (15 August 2012) v. Saudi Arabia (7 September 2012) v. Georgia (11 September 2012) v. Belarus (12 October 2012) v. France (16 October 2012) v. Panama (14 November 2012) |
| 8 | | Croatia | v. Switzerland (15 August 2012) v. North Macedonia (7 September 2012) v. Belgium (11 September 2012) v. North Macedonia (12 October 2012) v. Wales (16 October 2012) |
| 16 | José Campaña | Spain U19 | v. Greece (3 July 2012) v. Portugal (6 July 2012) v. Estonia (9 July 2012) v. France (12 July 2012) v. Greece (15 July 2012) |
| 22 | Geoffrey Kondogbia | France U20 | v. Ukraine (13 November 2012) |
| 28 | Álex Rubio | Spain U20 | v. Japan (17 August 2012) v. Saudi Arabia (19 August 2012) v. Argentina (21 August 2012) v. South Korea (22 August 2012) v. Argentina (23 August 2012) |
| 30 | Bryan Rabello | Chile U20 | v. France U21 (10 September 2012) v. Argentina (10 January 2013) v. Bolivia (12 January 2013) v. Colombia (13 January 2013) v. Paraguay (16 January 2013) v. Paraguay (20 January 2013) v. Ecuador (23 January 2013) v. Uruguay (27 January 2013) v. Colombia (30 January 2013) v. Peru (3 February 2013) |

== Match statistics ==
Updated to 29 January 2013

| No. | Pos. | Player | Goal | | Booked | | (yellow card) (yellow-red card) | | Sent off (straight red) | |
| No. | Pos. | Player | Liga | Cup | Liga | Cup | Liga | Cup | Liga | Cup |
|---|---|---|---|---|---|---|---|---|---|---|
| 1 | GK | (Spain) Andrés Palop | | | 1 | | | | | |
| 2 | DF | (Argentina) Federico Fazio | 3 | 1 | 2 | 1 | | | 2 | |
| 3 | DF | (Spain) Fernando Navarro | | | 5 | | | | | |
| 4 | DF | (Bosnia and Herzegovina) Emir Spahić | 1 | | 8 | 1 | | | | |
| 5 | DF | (Spain) Cala | | 1 | 2 | 1 | | | | |
| 6 | MF | (Spain) José Campaña | | | 2 | | | | | |
| 7 | MF | (Spain) Jesús Navas | | | 2 | 1 | | | | |
| 8 | MF | (Chile) Gary Medel | 3 | 1 | 6 | | 1 | | 1 | |
| 9 | FW | (Spain) Álvaro Negredo | 9 | 5 | 1 | | | | | |
| 10 | MF | (Argentina) Diego Perotti | | 1 | 1 | | | | | |
| 11 | MF | (Croatia) Ivan Rakitić | 3 | 2 | 7 | | 1 | | | |
| 12 | MF | (Netherlands) Hedwiges Maduro | | | 2 | 1 | | | | |
| 13 | GK | (Spain) Diego López (Out) | | | | | | | 1 | |
| 14 | FW | (Spain) Manu | | 2 | 1 | 1 | | | | |
| 15 | MF | (Germany) Piotr Trochowski (LTI) | 2 | | | | | | | |
| 16 | MF | (Spain) Antonio Luna (Out) | | 1 | 1 | | | | 1 | |
| 19 | MF | (Spain) José Antonio Reyes | 3 | | 2 | | 1 | | | |
| 20 | FW | (Senegal) Baba Diawara | | 1 | | | | | | |
| 21 | DF | (Brazil) Cicinho | 1 | | 4 | 1 | | | | |
| 22 | MF | (France) Geoffrey Kondogbia | 1 | | 1 | | | | | |
| 23 | DF | (Spain) Coke | | | 2 | | 1 | | | |
| 24 | DF | (Spain) Alberto Botía | | 1 | 7 | 1 | | | | |

== Competitions ==
=== Pre-season and friendly tournaments ===
==== Friendly matches ====
| 13 July 2012 | Roteña | 0–6 | Sevilla | Rota |
| 21:00 CEST | | Live TV: SFC Televisión; Deferred at 22:00 in: | 21' Maduro; 56' (pen.), 63' Rubio; 75' Rabello; 82' Trochowski; 90+2' (pen.) Manu | Stadium: Antonio Puntas Velas; Attendance: 2,000; Referee: Benítez Maceas |

| 22 July 2012 | San Fernando | 2–1 | Sevilla | San Fernando |
| 21:30 CEST | Carrión 39' (pen.); Ñoño 53', (yellow card); Verdú (yellow card) | (Report); Live TV: SFC Televisión; Deferred at 22:15 in: | 66' Romaric | Stadium: Iberoamericano 2010; Attendance: 1,000; Referee: Milla Alvéndiz |

| 1 August 2012 | Córdoba | 1–0 | Sevilla | Córdoba |
| 21:30 CEST | Pedro 53' | (Report); Live TV: SFC Televisión | (yellow card) 41' Manu; (yellow card) 80' Spahić | Stadium: Nuevo Arcángel; Attendance: 9,500; Referee: López Amaya |

| 4 August 2012 | Borussia Mönchengladbach | 0–0 | Sevilla | Mönchengladbach |
| 15:30 CEST | | (Report) | (yellow card) 11' Navarro; (yellow card) 47' Cala | Stadium: Borussia-Park; Attendance: 26,039; Referee: Christian Bandurski |

| 11 August 2012 | Mainz 05 | 3–3 | Sevilla | Mainz |
| 17:00 CEST | N. Müller 53'; Bungert 57'; Choupo-Moting 70' | (Report) | 63' Manu; 79', 86' Negredo | Stadium: Coface Arena; Attendance: 17,946; Referee: (Germany) Jochen Drees |

| 30 August 2012 | Los Barrios | 1–6 | Sevilla | Los Barrios |
| 20:30 CEST | Abel 26' | (Report) | 8', 71' Alfaro; 47', 62' Rubio; 78', 90+1' Trochowski | Stadium: San Rafael |

| 6 September 2012 | Mérida | 0–3 | Sevilla | Mérida |
| 21:00 CEST | | (Report) | 16' Campaña; 51' Hervás; 61' Manu | Stadium: Romano; Attendance: 4,000 |

| 9 September 2012 | Flamurtari Vlorë | 1–2 | Sevilla | Tirana |
| 18:30 CEST | Muzaka 8' | Live TV: SFC Televisión | 17' (pen.) Negredo; 50' Manu | Stadium: Qemal Stafa |

| 10 October 2012 | Coria | 1–4 | Sevilla | Coria del Río |
| 21:00 CEST | Curro 36'; Casado (red card) 89' | (Report) | 57' Hervás; 63' Cotán; 69' Botía; 90+1' Manu | Stadium: Guadalquivir |

==== 2nd Antonio Camacho Memorial ====
| 21 July 2012 Final | Arcos | 0–6 | Sevilla | Arcos de la Frontera |
| 21:30 CEST | | (Report); Live TV: SFC Televisión; Deferred at 22:30 in: | 36' Baba; 58' Trochowski; 88' Rakitić; 89' Acosta; 90' Rabello; 90+1' Manu | Stadium: Nuevo Antonio Barbadillo |

==== 36th Costa Brava Trophy ====
| 25 July 2012 Final | Girona | 0–1 | Sevilla | Girona |
| 21:00 CEST | García (yellow card) 84'; Eloi (yellow card) 88' | (Report); Live TV: SFC Televisión / Esport3 | (yellow card) 22' Medel; (yellow card) 31' Spahić; 47' Diawara | Stadium: Montilivi; Attendance: 2,751; Referee: Jaime Latre |

==== 5th Antonio Puerta Trophy ====
| 8 August 2012 Final | Sevilla | 2–0 | Deportivo La Coruña | Seville |
| 22:00 CEST | Negredo 30'; Trochowski 44' | (Report); Live TV: SFC Televisión | | Stadium: Ramón Sánchez Pizjuán; Attendance: 25,000; Referee: (Spain) (Andalusia) Pérez Montero |

=== La Liga ===
==== Matches ====
| 18 August 2012 1 | Sevilla | 2–1 | Getafe | Seville |
| 21:00 CEST | Fazio 33'; Negredo 37' (pen.); Rakitić (yellow card) 45+1'; Medel (yellow card) 53'; Spahić (yellow card) 53'; Manu (yellow card) 77' | (Report); Live TV: GolT / | Valera (yellow card) 35'; Alexis (yellow card) 42', (goal) 50'; Pedro León (yellow card) 48'; M. Torres (yellow card) 55' | Stadium: Ramón Sánchez Pizjuán; Attendance: 36,000; Referee: (Catalonia) Alfonso Álvarez Izquierdo |

| 26 August 2012 2 | Granada | 1–1 | Sevilla | Granada |
| 21:00 CEST | Siqueira (yellow card) 7'; M. Rico 36'; Iriney (yellow card) 69'; López (yellow card) 84' | (Report); Live TV: GolT / | López (red card) 33'; Negredo 44'; Botía (yellow card) 60'; Rakitić (yellow card) 75' | Stadium: Los Cáremenes; Attendance: 21,500; Referee: (Catalonia) Xavier Estrada Fernández |

| 2 September 2012 3 | Rayo Vallecano | 0–0 | Sevilla | Madrid |
| 12:00 CEST | Amat (yellow card) 44'; Fuego (yellow card) 61'; Martínez (red card) 69'; Casado (yellow card) 73'; Gálvez (yellow card) 90+1' | (Report); Live TV: GolT / | Rakitić (yellow card) 27'; Botía (yellow card) 53' | Stadium: Vallecas; Attendance: 14,000; Referee: (Aragon) Carlos Clos Gómez |

| 15 September 2012 4 | Sevilla | 1–0 | Real Madrid | Seville |
| 22:00 CEST | Trochowski 1'; Navarro (yellow card) 4'; Rakitić (yellow card) 43'; Luna (yellow card) 88' | (Report); Live TV: Canal+ 1 | Higuaín (yellow card) 4'; Di María (yellow card) 27'; Pepe (yellow card) 39' | Stadium: Ramón Sánchez Pizjuán; Attendance: 30,500; Referee: (Navarre) Alberto Undiano Mallenco |

| 24 September 2012 5 | Deportivo La Coruña | 0–2 | Sevilla | A Coruña |
| 21:30 CEST | | (Report); Live TV: | Botía (yellow card) 65'; Negredo 74'; Rakitić 83'; Navas (yellow card) 87' | Stadium: Riazor; Attendance: 30,000; Referee: (Castile and León) José González González |

| 29 September 2012 6 | Sevilla | 2–3 | Barcelona | Seville |
| 22:00 CEST | Trochowski 26'; Rakitić (yellow card) 28'; Negredo 48'; Medel (red card) 73'; Botía (yellow card) 90+4' | (Report); Live TV: Canal+ 1 | Fàbregas 53', 89'; Busquets (yellow card) 69'; Pedro (yellow card) 75'; Villa 90+3' | Stadium: Ramón Sánchez Pizjuán; Attendance: 40,000; Referee: (Valencian Community) Antonio Mateu Lahoz |

| 5 October 2012 7 | Celta Vigo | 2–0 | Sevilla | Vigo |
| 21:30 CEST | Krohn-Dehli (yellow card) 35'; Aspas 59' (pen.); López (yellow card) 72'; De Lucas 84' | (Report); Live TV: | Botía (yellow card) 40'; Maduro (yellow card) 59' | Stadium: Balaídos; Attendance: 16,000; Referee: (Extremadura) Jesús Gil Manzano |

| 22 October 2012 8 | Sevilla | 3–2 | Mallorca | Seville |
| 21:30 CEST | Negredo 29', 56'; Campaña (yellow card) 56'; Cicinho 75', (yellow card) 75' | (Report); Live TV: | Pina (yellow card) 17'; Bigas 26'; Hemed 30'; Navarro (yellow card) 84' | Stadium: Ramón Sánchez Pizjuán; Attendance: 35,000; Referee: (Catalonia) Xavier Estrada Fernández |

| 28 October 2012 9 | Zaragoza | 2–1 | Sevilla | Zaragoza |
| 12:00 CET | Postiga 37'; Săpunaru 44', (yellow card) 61'; Rodríguez (yellow card) 78'; Movilla (yellow card) 81' | (Report); Live TV: GolT / | (yellow card) 11' Botía; (yellow card) 62' Spahić; 69', (yellow card) 90+5' Medel; (yellow card) 90+4' Navas; (yellow card) 90+4' Fazio; (yellow card) 90+5' Cicinho | Stadium: La Romareda; Attendance: 23,000; Referee: (Community of Madrid) Carlos del Cerro Grande |

| 4 November 2012 10 | Sevilla | 0–0 | Levante | Seville |
| 21:30 CET | Medel (yellow card) 71' | (Report); Live TV: GolT / | Martins (yellow card) 90+2' | Stadium: Ramón Sánchez Pizjuán; Attendance: 26,000; Referee: (Aragon) Carlos Clos Gómez |

| 11 November 2012 11 | Athletic Bilbao | 2–1 | Sevilla | Bilbao |
| 16:00 CET | Susaeta (yellow card) 24', (goal) 45+1'; De Marcos 26', (yellow card) 53'; Muniain (yellow card) 39'; Herrera (yellow card) 64' (yellow-red card) 75'; Iraola (yellow card) 77'; Iturraspe (yellow card) 90+3' | (Report); Live TV: GolT / | (yellow card) 3' Campaña; (yellow card) 18' Cala; (yellow card) 59' Medel; 78' (pen.) Negredo; (yellow card) 83' Spahić; (yellow card) 83' Fazio | Stadium: San Mamés; Attendance: 36,000; Referee: (Canary Islands) Alejandro Hernández Hernández |

| 18 November 2012 12 | Sevilla | 5–1 | Betis | Seville |
| 21:30 CET | Reyes 1', 32'; Fazio 4', 42'; Spahić (yellow card) 20'; Palop (yellow card) 56'; Medel (yellow card) 63'; Rakitić 90+1' | (Report); Live TV: Canal+ 1 | (yellow card) 35' Paulão; (yellow card) 47' Pozuelo; (yellow card) 56' (yellow-red card) 61' Pérez; 66' Castro | Stadium: Ramón Sánchez Pizjuán; Attendance: 45,000; Referee: (Cantabria) Fernando Teixeira Vitienes |

| 25 November 2012 13 | Atlético Madrid | 4–0 | Sevilla | Madrid |
| 19:00 CET | Falcao 21' (pen.); Spahić 39' (o.g.); Koke 43', (yellow card) 49'; Costa (yellow card) 60'; Miranda 90+2' | (Report); Live TV: GolT / | (red card) 19' Fazio; (yellow card) 23' Spahić; (yellow card) 34' Maduro; (yellow card) 76' (yellow-red card) 82' Rakitić; (red card) 80' Luna | Stadium: Vicente Calderón; Attendance: 46,000; Referee: (Galicia (Spain)) Ignacio Iglesias Villanueva |

| 3 December 2012 14 | Sevilla | 1–2 | Valladolid | Seville |
| 21:30 CET | Navarro (yellow card) 42'; Medel (yellow card) 43' (yellow-red card) 63'; Manucho 49' (o.g.); Cala (yellow card) 53' | (Report); Live TV: | 1', (yellow card) 71' Ebert; (yellow card) 10' Rukavina; 12' Óscar; (yellow card) 79' Hernández; (yellow card) 88' Peña; (yellow card) 90+1' Bueno; (yellow card) 90+4' Pérez | Stadium: Ramón Sánchez Pizjuán; Attendance: 20,000; Referee: (Cantabria) José Teixeira Vitienes |

| 7 December 2012 15 | Espanyol | 2–2 | Sevilla | Cornellà de Llobregat |
| 21:30 CET | Verdú 13' (pen.); Stuani (yellow card) 22'; Colotto (yellow card) 36'; Sánchez (yellow card) 45'; Simão 59'; Mubarak (yellow card) 79'; Moreno (yellow card) 87' | (Report); Live TV: | 23' (pen.) Rakitić; (yellow card) 32' (yellow-red card) 38' Reyes; (yellow card) 38' Perotti; (yellow card) 87' Navarro; (yellow card) 90', (goal) 90+1' Negredo | Stadium: Cornellà-El Prat; Attendance: 16,712; Referee: (Asturias) César Muñiz Fernández |

| 15 December 2012 16 | Sevilla | 0–2 | Málaga | Seville |
| 22:00 CET | Spahić (yellow card) 58'; Fazio (red card) 69' | (Report); Live TV: GolT / | (yellow card) 34' Iturra; (yellow card) 35' Weligton; 49' Demichelis; (yellow card) 62' Camacho; 70' (pen.) Eliseu; (yellow card) 77' Sánchez | Stadium: Ramón Sánchez Pizjuán; Attendance: 22,000; Referee: (Valencian Community) Miguel Ayza Gámez |

| 20 December 2012 17 | Real Sociedad | 2–1 | Sevilla | San Sebastián |
| 22:00 CET | I. Martínez (yellow card) 37'; Vela 18'; De la Bella 69'; Illarramendi (yellow card) 82' | (Report); Live TV: | Spahić (yellow card) 23'; Medel 49'; Coke (yellow card) 71' (yellow-red card) 74'; Botía (yellow card) 76'; Navarro (yellow card) 80' | Stadium: Anoeta; Attendance: 22,000; Referee: (Catalonia) Alfonso Álvarez Izquierdo |

| 5 January 2013 18 | Sevilla | 1–0 | Osasuna | Seville |
| 22:00 CET | Cicinho (yellow card) 49'; Spahić (yellow card) 68', (goal) 83' | (Report); Live TV: GolT / | Bertrán (yellow card) 46' | Stadium: Ramón Sánchez Pizjuán; Attendance: 20,000; Referee: (Community of Madrid) Carlos del Cerro Grande |

| 12 January 2013 19 | Valencia | 2–0 | Sevilla | Valencia |
| 22:00 CET | Parejo (yellow card) 38'; Soldado 50', 87'; Pereira (yellow card) 84'; Ruiz (yellow card) 90+1' | (Report); Live TV: GolT / | Navarro (yellow card) 46'; Rakitić (yellow card) 55' | Stadium: Mestalla; Attendance: 35,000; Referee: (Catalonia) Xavier Estrada Fernández |

| 19 January 2013 20 | Getafe | 1–1 | Sevilla | Getafe |
| 20:00 CET | Colunga 43', (yellow card) 77'; Alexis (yellow card) 51'; Borja (yellow card) 62'; X. Torres (yellow card) 82' | (Report); Live TV: GolT / | Reyes 39'; Coke (yellow card) 71'; Kondogbia (yellow card) 82' | Stadium: Coliseum Alfonso Pérez; Attendance: 7,000; Referee: (Valencian Community) Antonio Mateu Lahoz |

| 28 January 2013 21 | Sevilla | 3–0 | Granada | Seville |
| 21:30 CET | Reyes (yellow card) 19'; Kondogbia 31'; Cicinho (yellow card) 60'; Negredo 70'; Medel 74' | (Report); Live TV: | Orellana (yellow card) 41'; Diakhaté (yellow card) 54'; M. Rico (yellow card) 69'; Ortiz (yellow card) 88' | Stadium: Ramón Sánchez Pizjuán; Attendance: 29,000; Referee: (Extremadura) Jesús Gil Manzano |

| 2 February 2013 22 | Sevilla | 2–1 | Rayo Vallecano | Seville |
| 17:00 CET | Rakitić 45+2', (yellow card) 89' (yellow-red card) 90+1'; Navarro (yellow card) 50'; Negredo 54'; Fazio (yellow card) 76'; Spahić (yellow card) 81' | Live TV: GolT / | José Carlos (yellow card) 26'; Domínguez 51' (pen.); Gálvez (yellow card) 58'; Tito (yellow card) 69'; Bangoura (yellow card) 83' | Stadium: Ramón Sánchez Pizjuán; Attendance: 40,000; Referee: César Muñiz Fernández |

| 9 February 2013 23 | Real Madrid | 4–1 | Sevilla | Madrid |
| 22:00 CET | Benzema 18'; Ronaldo 26', 46', 59'; Higuaín (yellow card) 39' (yellow-red card) 66'; Kaká (yellow card) 58'; Arbeloa (yellow card) 82'; Modrić (yellow card) 86'; Morata (yellow card) 88' | Live TV: Canal+ 1 | Navas (yellow card) 42'; Maduro (yellow card) 64' (yellow-red card) 80'; Manu 87' | Stadium: Santiago Bernabéu; Attendance: 65,000; Referee: Carlos Delgado Ferreiro |

| 17 February 2013 24 | Sevilla | 3–1 | Deportivo La Coruña | Seville |
| 15:30 | Rakitić 6', (yellow card) 74'; Medel 27', 40', (yellow card) 74'; Kondogbia (yellow card) 36'; Coke (yellow card) 36'; Botía (yellow card) 65'; Spahić (yellow card) 90+2' | | Aguilar (yellow card) 14'; Riki 32'; Assunção (yellow card) 44' | Stadium: Ramón Sánchez Pizjuán; Attendance: 32,000; Referee: José Teixeira Vitienes |

| 24 February 2013 25 | Barcelona | 2–1 | Sevilla | Barcelona |
| 16:00 | Villa 52'; Messi 60' | | Navarro (yellow card) 33'; Botía 42', (yellow card) 86' | Stadium: Camp Nou; Attendance: 57629; Referee: Carlos Velasco Carballo |

| 3 March 2013 26 | Sevilla | 4–1 | Celta Vigo | Seville |
| 15:30 | Negredo 12', 29', 68'; Rakitić (yellow card) 54'; Medel 66' | | Fernández 40'; Castro (yellow card) 53' | Stadium: Ramón Sánchez Pizjuán; Attendance: 27,000; Referee: Carlos del Cerro Grande |

| 10 March 2013 27 | Mallorca | 2–1 | Sevilla | Palma |
| 16:00 | Alfaro 16', 66'; Hutton (yellow card) 45'; Martí (yellow card) 71'; Dos Santos (yellow card) 72'; Márquez (yellow card) 76' (yellow-red card) 90+3' | | Negredo 61'; Moreno (yellow card) 77'; Cicinho (yellow card) 88' | Stadium: Iberostar; Attendance: 20,615; Referee: Carlos Clos Gómez |

| 17 March 2013 28 | Sevilla | 4–0 | Zaragoza | Seville |
| | Moreno (yellow card) 21'; Coke 28', 52'; Navas (yellow card) 47'; Reyes 63'; Negredo 68' | | Babović (yellow card) 14' (yellow-red card) 31'; Săpunaru (yellow card) 27'; Loovens (yellow card) 35' | Stadium: Ramón Sánchez Pizjuán; Attendance: 18,000; Referee: Alejandro Hernández Hernández |

| 31 March 2013 29 | Levante | 1–0 | Sevilla | Valencia |
| 17:00 | Vyntra (yellow card) 3'; García 40', (yellow card) 90+2'; D. Navarro (yellow card) 57'; Ríos (yellow card) 75' | | F. Navarro (yellow card) 26'; Navas (yellow card) 70'; Negredo (yellow card) 73' | Stadium: Ciutat de València; Attendance: 12,304; Referee: Fernando Teixeira Vitienes |

| 7 April 2013 30 | Sevilla | 2–1 | Athletic Bilbao | Seville |
| 16:00 | Negredo 5', 87'; Navarro (yellow card) 25' (yellow-red card) 73'; Coke (yellow card) 27'; Fazio (yellow card) 51'; Perotti (yellow card) 90' | | Iraola (yellow card) 5'; Gurpegui (yellow card) 41', (goal) 55'; Herrera (yellow card) 48'; Aduriz (yellow card) 50'; De Marcos (yellow card) 67'; Iturraspe (yellow card) 75'; Laporte (yellow card) 78' (yellow-red card) 80' | Stadium: Ramón Sánchez Pizjuán; Attendance: 29,000; Referee: Antonio Mateu Lahoz |

| 14 April 2013 31 | Betis | 3–3 | Sevilla | Seville |
| 16:00 | Beñat (yellow card) 6'; Amaya (yellow card) 30'; Chica (yellow card) 30'; Pabón 43'; Castro 54' (pen.); Cañas (yellow card) 56'; Campbell (yellow card) 63'; Igiebor 89' | | Rakitić 7', 19'; Negredo 33'; Fazio (yellow card) 53'; Medel (red card) 56'; Cala (yellow card) 89'; Moreno (yellow card) 90+4' | Stadium: Benito Villamarín; Attendance: 43,000; Referee: (Community of Madrid) Carlos del Cerro Grande |

| 21 April 2013 32 | Sevilla | 0–1 | Atlético Madrid | Seville |
| 15:00 | Botía (yellow card) 37' | | Falcao (yellow card) 11', (goal) 76'; Godín (yellow card) 24'; Suárez (yellow card) 57'; Costa (yellow card) 59'; Courtois (yellow card) 90' | Stadium: Ramón Sánchez Pizjuán; Attendance: 35,000; Referee: José González González |

| 28 April 2013 33 | Valladolid | 1–1 | Sevilla | Valladolid |
| 13:00 | Guerra 41'; Valiente (yellow card) 61'; Ebert (yellow card) 67' | | Cala (yellow card) 3'; Hervás (yellow card) 55'; Negredo 62' (pen.) | Stadium: José Zorrilla; Attendance: 16,832; Referee: Alberto Undiano Mallenco |

| 5 May 2013 34 | Sevilla | 3–0 | Espanyol | Seville |
| 13:00 | Capdevila 12' (o.g.); Negredo (yellow card) 16', (goal) 23'; Coke 19' | | López (yellow card) 45'; Wakaso (yellow card) 72' | Stadium: Ramón Sánchez Pizjuán; Attendance: 35,000; Referee: Carlos Delgado Ferreiro |

| 12 May 2013 35 | Málaga | 0–0 | Sevilla | Málaga |
| 15:00 | Isco (yellow card) 36'; Gámez (yellow card) 41'; Baptista (yellow card) 80'; Lugano (yellow card) 86' | | Moreno (yellow card) 50'; Manu (yellow card) 77'; Medel (yellow card) 79' | Stadium: La Rosaleda; Attendance: 26,046; Referee: Miguel Pérez Lasa |

| 19 May 2013 36 | Sevilla | 1–2 | Real Sociedad | Seville |
| 16:00 | Rakitić 10'; Kondogbia (yellow card) 16'; Navarro (yellow card) 42'; Reyes (red card) 58'; Moreno (yellow card) 63'; Diawara (yellow card) 90' | | Rakitić 16' (o.g.); Vela (yellow card) 19'; Agirretxe 24', (yellow card) 55'; Cadamuro-Bentaïba (yellow card) 78' | Stadium: Ramón Sánchez Pizjuán; Attendance: 27,000; Referee: Alfonso Álvarez Izquierdo |

| 29 May 2013 37 | Osasuna | 2–1 | Sevilla | Pamplona |
| 14:00 | Puñal 63'; Cejudo 79'; Riesgo (yellow card) 79'; Bertrán (yellow card) 85'; Damià (yellow card) 86'; Arribas (yellow card) 90+3' | | Negredo 50'; Botía (yellow card) 60'; Kondogbia (yellow card) 62' | Stadium: El Sadar; Attendance: 19,594; Referee: César Muñiz Fernández |

| 1 June 2013 38 | Sevilla | 4–3 | Valencia | Seville |
| 15:00 | Negredo 40', 44' (pen.), 57', 61'; Navarro (yellow card) 41'; Cala (yellow card) 75'; Coke (yellow card) 83' | | Banega 12'; Soldado (yellow card) 35', (goal) 56', 88'; R. Costa (yellow card) 42'; Albelda (yellow card) 45'; Parejo (yellow card) 45'; Jonas (red card) 45'; Pereira (yellow card) 72'; Feghouli (yellow card) 88' | Stadium: Ramón Sánchez Pizjuán; Attendance: 35,000; Referee: Carlos Clos Gómez |

=== Copa del Rey ===
==== Round of 32 ====
| 1 November 2012 First leg | Sevilla | 3–1 | Espanyol | Seville |
| 19:00 CET | Fazio 3'; Cicinho (yellow card) 58'; Cala 82'; Negredo 90+3' (pen.) | (Report); Live TV: GolT / | (yellow card) 39' Baena; 68' Christian; (yellow card) 70' Simão; (yellow card) 81' Capdevila; (yellow card) 84' (yellow-red card) 90+3' Galán; (yellow card) 86' Forlín; (yellow card) 88' Sánchez | Stadium: Ramón Sánchez Pizjuán; Attendance: 25,000; Referee: (Basque Country (autonomous community)) Miguel Pérez Lasa |

| 28 November 2012 Second leg | Espanyol | 0–3 (1–6 agg.) | Sevilla | Cornellà de Llobregat |
| 21:30 CET | Mubarak (yellow card) 8'; López (red card) 25' | (Report); Live TV: GolT / | 26' (pen.) Perotti; (yellow card) 38' Botía; 45' Rakitić; 49' Diawara; (yellow card) 81' Cala | Stadium: Cornellà-El Prat; Referee: (Aragon) Carlos Clos Gómez |

==== Round of 16 ====
| 12 December 2012 First leg | Mallorca | 0–5 | Sevilla | Palma |
| 20:00 CET | Geromel (yellow card) 33'; Kevin (yellow card) 59' | (Report); Live TV: GolT (connections) / | 13', 18' Negredo; (yellow card) 23' Manu; 26' Medel; (yellow card) 44' Fazio; 48' Botía; 85' Luna | Stadium: Iberostar; Attendance: 4,330; Referee: (Aragon) Carlos Clos Gómez |

| 9 January 2013 Second leg | Sevilla | 1–2 (6–2 agg.) | Mallorca | Seville |
| 19:30 CET | Manu 22' | (Report); Live TV: GolT / | 52' Brandon; 56' Alfaro | Stadium: Ramón Sánchez Pizjuán; Attendance: 20,000; Referee: (Castile and León) José González González |

==== Quarter-finals ====
| 16 January 2013 First leg | Zaragoza | 0–0 | Sevilla | Zaragoza |
| 19:30 CET | Álvaro (yellow card) 25'; Paredes (yellow card) 83' | (Report); Live TV: GolT / | (yellow card) 40' Navas; (yellow card) 72' Maduro | Stadium: La Romareda; Attendance: 5,000; Referee: (Cantabria) Fernando Teixeira Vitienes |

| 23 January 2013 Second leg | Sevilla | 4–0 (4–0 agg.) | Zaragoza | Seville |
| 19:30 CET | Spahić (yellow card) 16'; Negredo 36', 66' (pen.); Rakitić 45+3'; Manu 90+2' | (Report); Live TV: GolT / | (yellow card) 10' Wílchez; (red card) 26' Fernández; (yellow card) 48' (yellow-red card) 65' González; (yellow card) 69' Săpunaru | Stadium: Ramón Sánchez Pizjuán; Attendance: 20,000; Referee: (Community of Madrid) Carlos Velasco Carballo |

==== Semi-finals ====
| 31 January 2013 First leg | Atlético Madrid | 2–1 | Sevilla | Madrid |
| 22:00 CET | Costa 50' (pen.), 71' (pen.); Godín (red card) 55'; Suárez (yellow card) 78' | | Spahić (yellow card) 17' (yellow-red card) 48'; Maduro (yellow card) 34'; Negredo 56' (pen.); Medel (yellow card) 69'; Navarro (yellow card) 70' (yellow-red card) 85' | Stadium: Vicente Calderón; Attendance: 45,000; Referee: Miguel Ayza |

| 27 February 2013 Second leg | Sevilla | 2–2 (3–4 agg.) | Atlético Madrid | Seville |
| 16:00 | Navas 39'; Kondogbia (yellow card) 43' (red card) 90+3'; Medel (yellow card) 76' (yellow-red card) 76'; Rakitić (yellow card) 78', (goal) 90+1' | | Costa 6'; Falcao 29'; García (yellow card) 44'; Díaz (yellow card) 48' | Stadium: Ramón Sánchez Pizjuán; Attendance: 45,000; Referee: Fernando Teixeira Vitienes |
