= 2011–12 Sevilla FC season =

105th season in existence of Sevilla FC

Sevilla
2011–12 season
- President: José María del Nido
- Head coach: Marcelino (until 6 February); Míchel (from 7 February)
- La Liga: 9th
- Copa del Rey: Round of 16
- UEFA Europa League: Play-off round
- Top goalscorer: League: Álvaro Negredo (14); All: Álvaro Negredo (14)
Home colours	Away colours	Third colours

The 2011–12 Spanish football season is Sevilla Fútbol Club's 11th consecutive season in La Liga and eighth consecutive playing European competitions since its participation in the 2004–05 UEFA Cup, despite the earlier fall in the Fourth Qualifying Round in August. The team manager in the previous season, Gregorio Manzano, did not continue in the club. During the summer of 2011, Sevilla signed Marcelino as new manager after he unilaterally severed his contract with Racing de Santander. On 6 February, after losing 1–2 at home against Villarreal and after Sevilla earned just two points in its previous seven matches, he was sacked and replaced with Míchel. Finishing in ninth, the team did not qualify for European competition for the first time since 2004.

== Trophies balance ==
Category	Trophy	Started round	First match	Result	Last match
Friendly Trophy	4th Antonio Puerta Trophy	Final	4 August 2011	Winners	4 August 2011
Friendly Trophy	66th Teresa Herrera Trophy	Final	14 August 2011	Winners	14 August 2011
Competitive	Liga BBVA	—	28 August 2011	9th	13 May 2012
Competitive	Copa del Rey	Round of 32	13 December 2011	Round of 16	11 January 2012
Competitive	UEFA Europa League	Fourth Qualifying Round	18 August 2011	Fourth Qualifying Round	25 August 2011

=== Competitive balance ===
Biggest win
	Home				Away			
Liga BBVA	5 December 2011	Matchday 15	v. Getafe	3 – 0	22 March 2012	Matchday 29	v. Racing Santander	0 – 3
Liga BBVA	12 April 2012	Matchday 33	v. Real Zaragoza	3 – 0	22 March 2012	Matchday 29	v. Racing Santander	0 – 3
Liga BBVA	5 May 2012	Matchday 37	v. Rayo Vallecano	5 – 2	26 March 2012	Matchday 30	v. Granada	0 – 3
Copa del Rey	20 December 2011	Round of 32, 2nd leg	v. San Roque Lepe	2 – 1	14 December 2011	Round of 32, 1st leg	v. San Roque Lepe	0 – 1
Copa del Rey	11 January 2012	Round of 16, 2nd leg	v. Valencia	2 – 1	14 December 2011	Round of 32, 1st leg	v. San Roque Lepe	0 – 1
UEFA Europa League	None due to the elimination in the Fourth Qualifying Round							
Biggest loss
	Home				Away			
Liga BBVA	17 December 2011	Matchday 17	v. Real Madrid	2 – 6	16 April 2012	Matchday 34	v. Getafe	5 – 1
Copa del Rey	None registered				5 January 2012	Round of 16, 1st leg	v. Valencia	1 – 0
UEFA Europa League	None due to the elimination in the Fourth Qualifying Round				18 August 2011	Fourth Qualifying Round	v. (Germany) Hannover 96	2 – 1

== Summer transfers ==
=== In ===
(substituted on) In (5 players)
Player	From	Fee
(Uruguay) Martín Cáceres	(Spain) Barcelona	€3M
(Germany) Piotr Trochowski	(Germany) Hamburger SV	Free
(Spain) Manu	(Spain) Getafe	€4.5M
(Spain) Coke	(Spain) Rayo Vallecano	€1.7M
(Bosnia and Herzegovina) Emir Spahić	(France) Montpellier	€2M

=== Out ===
(substituted off) Out (10 players)
Player	New Team	Fee
(Serbia) Ivica Dragutinović	Retired	
(Brazil) Renato	(Brazil) Botafogo	Free
(Ivory Coast) Didier Zokora	(Turkey) Trabzonspor	€6M
(Spain) Sergio Sánchez	(Spain) Málaga	€2.8M
(Spain) José Carlos	(Greece) AEK Athens	Free
(Spain) Diego Capel	(Portugal) Sporting CP	€3.5M
(Spain) David Prieto	(Spain) Córdoba	Free
(Spain) Alejandro Alfaro	(Spain) Mallorca	€0.7M
(Spain) Rodri	(Spain) Barcelona B	€1.5M
(France) Mouhamadou Dabo	(France) Lyon	€1M

=== Loan out ===
(substituted off) Loan out (5 players)
Player	Team
(Spain) Cala	(Greece) AEK Athens
(Argentina) Lautaro Acosta	(Spain) Racing Santander
(Ivory Coast) Arouna Koné	(Spain) Levante
(Ivory Coast) Romaric	(Spain) Espanyol
(Colombia) Bernardo	(Spain) Racing Santander

=== Loan return ===
(substituted on) Loan return (3 players)
Italics for players returning to the club but left it during pre-season
Player	From
(Spain) Antonio Luna	(Spain) Almería
(Belgium) Tom De Mul	(Belgium) Standard Liège
(Argentina) Emiliano Armenteros	(Spain) Rayo Vallecano
(Spain) José Carlos	(Spain) Cartagena
(Spain) Cala	(Spain) Cartagena
(Spain) David Prieto	(Spain) Tenerife

=== Loan end ===
(substituted off) Loan end (1 player)
Player	Returns to
(Italy) Luca Cigarini	(Italy) Napoli
(Uruguay) Martín Cáceres	(Spain) Barcelona

== Winter transfers ==
=== In ===
(substituted on) In (2 players)
Player	From	Fee
(Spain) José Antonio Reyes	(Spain) Atlético Madrid	€3.5M
(Senegal) Baba Diawara	(Portugal) Marítimo	€3M
(Spain) Javi Hervás	(Spain) Córdoba	€1.2M

=== Loan out ===
(substituted off) Loan out (4 players)
Player	Team
(Argentina) Emiliano Armenteros	(Spain) Rayo Vallecano
(Uruguay) Martín Cáceres	(Italy) Juventus
(Spain) Alexis	(Spain) Getafe
(Spain) Javi Hervás	(Spain) Córdoba

=== Loan return ===
(substituted on) Loan return (1 player)
Player	From
(Spain) Cala	(Greece) AEK Athens

== Current squad ==
=== Squad ===
Note: Flags indicate national team as defined under FIFA eligibility rules; some limited exceptions apply. Players may hold more than one non-FIFA nationality.

No.	Pos.	Nation	Player
1	GK	ESP	Andrés Palop (captain)
2	DF	ARG	Federico Fazio
3	DF	ESP	Fernando Navarro
6	DF	BIH	Emir Spahić
7	MF	ESP	Jesús Navas
8	MF	CHI	Gary Medel
9	FW	ESP	Álvaro Negredo
10	MF	ARG	Diego Perotti
11	MF	CRO	Ivan Rakitić
12	FW	MLI	Frédéric Kanouté
13	GK	ESP	Javi Varas
14	DF	FRA	Julien Escudé

No.	Pos.	Nation	Player
15	MF	GER	Piotr Trochowski
16	MF	ESP	José Campaña
17	MF	ITA	Tiberio Guarente
19	DF	ESP	Antonio Luna
20	FW	ESP	Manu
21	MF	ESP	José Antonio Reyes
23	DF	ESP	Coke
24	MF	BEL	Tom De Mul
25	FW	SEN	Baba Diawara
26	FW	ESP	Luis Alberto
31	DF	ESP	Cala

=== Youth system ===
Note: Flags indicate national team as defined under FIFA eligibility rules; some limited exceptions apply. Players may hold more than one non-FIFA nationality.

No.	Pos.	Nation	Player
27	MF	ESP	Salva Rivas
28	FW	JPN	Hiroshi Ibusuki
29	GK	ESP	Dani Jiménez
30	GK	ESP	Sergio Rico
32	MF	ESP	Jozabed Sánchez

No.	Pos.	Nation	Player
33	DF	ESP	Samu de los Reyes
34	MF	ESP	Deivid Rodríguez
—	GK	ESP	Julián Cuesta
—	MF	ESP	Manuel Asencio 'Tano'

=== Long-term injuries ===
==== Tiberio Guarente's injured leg ====
Out between: November 2010 – November 2011

On 6 November 2010, Sevilla's medical services discovered a strange injury in Tiberio Guarente's leg that required treatment. This injury caused that the Italian player was more than 6 months out of the stadiums. He officially played for first time after his injury in San Mamés, against Athletic Bilbao on 8 April 2012, 531 days after his last match.

==== Jesús Navas' left ankle ====
Out between: April 2011 – July 2011

In some training season before the match against Mallorca, Jesús Navas had discomfort in his left ankle, which had been twisted in the beginning of the last session in a Europa League match against PSG. He wasn't called to that match and medical tests were made. It was discovered that he suffered from a relapse of that injury, a stress fracture in his ankle. During the summer holidays Jesus Navas could successfully finish their recovery. He was seen at the usual level in the first pre-season game against UD Roteña.

==== Arouna Koné's problem of spasms and cold ====
Out between: July 2011 – August 2011

After finishing the first pre-season friendly match against UD Roteña the Ivorian player Arouna Koné had to be moved from the emergency to the hospital in Rota Naval Base and then to the Hospital de Jerez de la Frontera for suffering an abrupt spasms box with feeling intense cold and general malaise. According to the club through its website, the player will remain at Jerez de la Frontera to be diagnosed with the disease, evaluating whether or not it is transient and temporary, and replace it. He was discharged two days later but remained under observation at the Hospital in Seville for 48 hours. The player recovered earlier than expected, making it clear that it was a mild condition that could be easily retrieved. Still, the club's medical services recommended a lighter rhythm of training during the preseason to avoid repetition, returning to be one hundred percent in early August.

==== Frédéric Kanouté's injury in his biceps femoris ====
Out between: April 2012 – May 2012

During the second half of the match in San Mamés against Athletic Bilbao on 8 April 2012, Frédéric Kanouté felt some discomfort in the hamstring of his right leg that prevented him from playing. He was replaced by Baba Diawara, and medical tests confirmed days later that he suffered a grade II tear in the biceps femoris of the leg, an injury that kept him away from the fields from that matchday until the end of the season. He returned against Rayo Vallecano on Matchday 37, his last match at the Ramón Sánchez Pizjuán as a Sevilla player, scoring a goal.

=== Called up by their national football team ===
List of players called up by their national team
2	Federico Fazio	Argentina	v. Nigeria (1 June 2011) v. Poland (5 June 2011)
4	Martín Cáceres (Out)	Uruguay	v. Netherlands (8 June 2011) v. Plaza Colonia (11 June 2011) v. Estonia (23 June 2011) v. Uruguay U20 (29 June 2011) v. Peru (4 July 2011) v. Chile (8 July 2011) v. Mexico U22 (12 July 2011) v. Argentina (16 July 2011) v. Peru (19 July 2011) v. Paraguay (24 July 2011) v. Ukraine (2 September 2011) v. Bolivia (7 October 2011) v. Paraguay (11 October 2011) v. Chile (11 November 2011)
6	Emir Spahić	Bosnia and Herzegovina	v. Greece (10 August 2011) v. Belarus (2 September 2011) v. Belarus (6 September 2011) v. Luxembourg (7 October 2011) v. France (11 October 2011) v. Portugal (11 November 2011) v. Portugal (15 November 2011) v. Brazil (28 February 2012) v. Republic of Ireland (26 May 2012) v. Mexico (30 May 2012)
7	Jesús Navas	Spain	v. England (12 November 2011) v. Costa Rica (15 November 2011) v. Venezuela (29 February 2012) v. Serbia (26 May 2012) v. South Korea (30 May 2012) v. China (3 June 2012) v. Italy (10 June 2012) v. Republic of Ireland (14 June 2012) v. Croatia (18 June 2012) v. France (23 June 2012) v. Portugal (27 June 2012) v. Italy (1 July 2012)
8	Gary Medel	Chile	v. Estonia (19 June 2011) v. Paraguay (23 June 2011) v. Mexico U22 (4 July 2011) v. Uruguay (8 July 2011) v. Peru (12 July 2011) v. Venezuela (17 July 2011) v. France (10 August 2011) v. Spain (2 September 2011) v. Mexico (4 September 2011) v. Argentina (7 October 2011) v. Peru (11 October 2011) v. Uruguay (11 November 2011) v. Paraguay (15 November 2011) v. Ghana (29 February 2012)
9	Álvaro Negredo	Spain	v. United States (4 June 2011) v. Venezuela (7 June 2011) v. Italy (10 August 2011) v. Chile (2 September 2011) v. Liechtenstein (5 September 2011) v. Czech Republic (7 October 2011) v. Scotland (11 October 2011) v. Venezuela (29 February 2012) v. Serbia (26 May 2012) v. South Korea (30 May 2012) v. China (3 June 2012) v. Italy (10 June 2012) v. Republic of Ireland (14 June 2012) v. Croatia (18 June 2012) v. France (23 June 2012) v. Portugal (27 June 2012) v. Italy (1 July 2012)
10	Diego Perotti	Argentina	v. Nigeria (1 June 2011) v. Poland (5 June 2011)
11	Ivan Rakitić	Croatia	v. Greece (7 October 2011) v. Latvia (11 October 2011) v. Turkey (11 November 2011) v. Turkey (15 November 2011) v. Sweden (29 February 2012) v. Estonia (25 May 2012) v. Norway (2 June 2012) v. Republic of Ireland (10 June 2012) v. Italy (14 June 2012) v. Spain (18 June 2012)
16	José Campaña	Spain U19	v. Belgium (21 July 2011) v. Serbia (23 July 2011) v. Turkey (26 July 2011) v. Republic of Ireland (29 July 2011) v. Czech Republic (1 August 2011) v. France (29 February 2012) v. Montenegro (27 March 2012) v. Montenegro (29 March 2012) v. Armenia (23 May 2012) v. Italy (25 May 2012) v. Belgium (28 May 2012)
19	Antonio Luna	Spain U20	v. Peru (24 July 2011) v. Costa Rica (31 July 2011) v. Ecuador (3 August 2011) v. Australia (6 August 2011) v. South Korea (10 August 2011) v. Brazil (14 August 2011)
20	Manu	Spain	v. United States (4 June 2011) v. Venezuela (7 June 2011)

== Match stats ==
No.	Pos.	Player	Goal			Booked			(yellow card) (yellow-red card)			Sent off (straight red)		
No.	Pos.	Player	Liga	Cup	UEL	Liga	Cup	UEL	Liga	Cup	UEL	Liga	Cup	UEL
1	GK	(Spain) Andrés Palop				1								
2	DF	(Argentina) Federico Fazio	2			8		1	1					
3	DF	(Spain) Fernando Navarro				12	1	1	1					
4	DF	(Uruguay) Martín Cáceres (Out)	1			3	2							
5	DF	(Spain) Alexis	1			1		1						
6	DF	(Bosnia and Herzegovina) Emir Spahić				12	1							
7	MF	(Spain) Jesús Navas	5			5	1							
8	MF	(Chile) Gary Medel	2			16	2	1	1					1
9	FW	(Spain) Álvaro Negredo	14			5								
10	MF	(Argentina) Diego Perotti				2		1						
11	MF	(Croatia) Ivan Rakitić		1		4	1							
12	FW	(Mali) Frédéric Kanouté	4	3	1	7	2	1				1		
13	GK	(Spain) Javi Varas				1								
14	DF	(France) Julien Escudé	1			9						1		
15	MF	(Germany) Piotr Trochowski	1			7	1		1					
16	MF	(Spain) José Campaña					1							
17	MF	(Italy) Tiberio Guarente				1								
18	MF	(Argentina) Emiliano Armenteros (Out)				1								
19	DF	(Spain) Antonio Luna	1			2	1							
20	FW	(Spain) Manu	10			5		1				1		
21	MF	(Spain) José Antonio Reyes	1			1								
23	DF	(Spain) Coke				7	1		1					
25	FW	(Senegal) Baba Diawara	3											
26	FW	(Spain) Luis Alberto					1							
31	DF	(Spain) Cala	1			2								
34	MF	(Spain) Deivid Rodríguez				2								

== Competitions ==
=== Pre-season and friendly tournaments ===
==== Friendly matches ====
14 July 2011	Alajuelense	Called off	Sevilla	Alajuela, Costa Rica
03:00 CEST; 13 July 19:00 Local time				Stadium: Alejandro Morera Soto

14 July 2011	Roteña	0–9	Sevilla	Rota (Cádiz)
21:30 CEST		(Report); Live TV: SFC Televisión	8' Armenteros; 20' Acosta; 39' Koné; 43' Fazio; 47' (pen.), 70' Negredo; 48', 79' Rodri; 80' Alfaro	Stadium: Antonio Puntas Velas; Attendance: 500; Referee: (Spain) (Andalusia) Sánchez Rincón

17 July 2011	Atlético Sanluqueño	1–3	Sevilla	Sanlúcar de Barrameda (Cádiz)
21:30 CEST	Pedro 65'	(Report); Live TV: SFC Televisión	51', 88' Kanouté; 70' Rodri	Stadium: El Palmar; Referee: (Spain) (Andalusia) González Pérez

17 July 2011	Saprissa	Called off	Sevilla	San José, Costa Rica
22:00 CEST; 14:00 Local time				Stadium: Ricardo Saprissa Aymá

21 July 2011	Pilas	0–4	Sevilla	Pilas (Sevilla)
21:30 CEST		(Report); Live TV: SFC Televisión	6' Navas; 19' (pen.), 25' Negredo; 90' Manu	Stadium: Municipal Los Ventolines; Attendance: 3,200; Referee: (Spain) (Andalusia) Bazo Peña

28 July 2011	Xerez	0–3	Sevilla	Jerez de la Frontera (Cádiz)
21:30 CEST	Cordero (yellow card); Cámara (yellow card) 82'	(Report); Live TV: SFC Televisión / Canal Sur	4', 27', 28' Kanouté; (red card) 53' Escudé; (yellow card) 89' Navas	Stadium: Chapín; Attendance: 4,000; Referee: (Spain) (Andalusia) Melero López

31 July 2011	Córdoba	1–4	Sevilla	Córdoba
21:45 CEST	García 57'; Vico (yellow card); López Silva (yellow card)	(Report); Live TV: SFC Televisión / Canal Sur	6' Negredo; 58', 66' Trochowski; 90+1' Navas; (yellow card) Spahić	Stadium: Nuevo Argángel; Attendance: 7,500; Referee: (Spain) (Community of Madrid) Lesma López

7 August 2011	Napoli	1–2	Sevilla	Naples
20:45 CEST	Mascara (yellow card) 12'; Hamšík 79' (pen.); Inler (yellow card) 82'; Maggio (red card) 84'; Lucarelli (red card) 90+2'	(Report); Live TV: SFC Televisión	(yellow card) 12' Navarro; 18' Coke; (yellow card) 56' Alexis; 65' Kanouté; (red card) 84' Spahić	Stadium: San Paolo; Attendance: 35,000; Referee: (Italy) Russo Di Nola

31 August 2011	Lorca Atlético	1–1	Sevilla	Lorca (Murcia)
21:00 CEST	Dieguito 25'; Lopes (yellow card)	(Report)	87' Alexis	Stadium: Francisco Artés Carrasco; Referee: (Spain) (Region of Murcia) López Martínez

6 October 2011	Coria	0–2	Sevilla	Coria del Río (Sevilla)
22:00 CEST		(Report)	45' Juanfran; 78' Rubio	Stadium: Guadalquivir

9 November 2011	Estepa Industrial	1–2	Sevilla	Estepa (Sevilla)
20:00 CET	Šuker 50'		9' Guarente; 60' Juanfran	Stadium: Era Verde

1 December 2011	Écija Balompié	2–1	Sevilla	Écija (Sevilla)
20:00 CET	Rodríguez 62'; Juan Pablo 82'	(Report)	41' Armenteros	Stadium: San Pablo

22 February 2012	Algeciras	0–4	Sevilla	Algeciras (Cádiz)
20:00 CET		(Report)	12' Campaña; 22' Trochowski; 34' Guarente; 75' Negredo	Stadium: Nuevo Mirador

17 April 2012	Legia Warsaw	0–2	Sevilla	Warsaw
18:00 CEST		(Report); Live TV: SFC Televisión	45', 60' Baba; (yellow card) 52' Cala; (yellow card) 80' Luis Alberto	Stadium: National Stadium

9 May 2012	Lebrija XI	1–3	Sevilla	Lebrija (Sevilla)
20:30 CEST	55'		9' Negredo; 55' Luis Alberto; 80' De Mul	Stadium: Municipal de Lebrija

16 May 2012	Sevilla Atlético	4–2	Sevilla	Seville
11:15 CEST	Tano 24'; Menudo 25+1'; Jony 34'; Jesús Alfaro 46'	Live TV: SFC Televisión	29' Cala; 47' Fazio	Stadium: Ciudad Deportiva José Ramón Cisneros

==== 4th Antonio Puerta Trophy ====
4 August 2011 Final	Sevilla	5–0	Espanyol	Seville
22:00 CEST	Alexis (yellow card) 8'; Trochowski (yellow card) 21'; Rodri 25', 76'; Manu 45+1'; Kanouté 73', 90'	(Report); Live TV: SFC Televisión / TV3	(yellow card) 82' López	Stadium: Ramón Sánchez Pizjuán; Attendance: 20,000; Referee: Paradas Romero

==== 66th Teresa Herrera Trophy ====
14 August 2011 Final	Deportivo La Coruña	1–1 (3–4 p)	Sevilla	A Coruña
20:00 CEST	Riki 5'	(Report); Live TV: SFC Televisión / TVG	84' Coke	Stadium: Riazor; Attendance: 13,000; Referee: Valdés Aller
	Penalties
	Vázquez (penalty scored); Lassad (penalty scored); Álvarez (penalty scored); Colotto (penalty missed); Xisco (penalty missed)		(penalty missed) Manu; (penalty scored) Perotti; (penalty scored) Salva; (penalty scored) Trochowski; (penalty scored) Negredo

=== La Liga ===
Matchday	2	3	4	5	6	7	8	9	10	11	12	13	14	15	16	17	18	19	1	21	22	23	24	25	26	27	28	29	30	31	32	33	34	35	36	20	37	38
Against	MGA	VIL	RSO	OSA	VAL	ATM	SPG	FCB	RAC	GRA	MLL	ATH	ZAR	GET	LEV	RM	RYV	ESP	BET	MGA	VIL	RSO	OSA	VAL	ATM	SPG	FCB	RAC	GRA	MLL	ATH	ZAR	GET	LEV	RM	BET	RYV	ESP
Venue	H	A	H	A	H	A	H	A	H	H	A	H	A	H	A	H	A	H	A	A	H	A	H	A	H	A	H	A	A	H	A	H	A	H	A	H	H	A
Position	5	6	4	5	4	6	4	4	5	5	5	6	6	5	5	6	7	7	9	11	11	13	11	10	10	11	12	11	9	8	8	7	9	9	9	12	10	9
Goal Average (useful in case of tie)																				Drawn	Lost	Lost	Won	Won	Drawn	Drawn	Lost	Won	Won	Won	Lost	Won	Lost	Lost	Lost	Lost	Won	Drawn

Win Draw Lost

		All							Home							Away						
		Pts	W	D	L	F	A	Dif.	Pts	W	D	L	F	A	Dif.	Pts	W	D	L	F	A	Dif.
9	Sevilla	50	13	11	14	48	47	+1	31	9	4	6	32	25	+7	19	4	7	8	16	22	–6

Liga BBVA Winner (also qualified for 2012–13 UEFA Champions League Group Stage)
2012–13 UEFA Champions League Group Stage
2012–13 UEFA Champions League 4th Qualifying Round
2012–13 UEFA Europa League Group Stage
2012–13 UEFA Europa League 4th Qualifying Round
2012–13 UEFA Europa League 3rd Qualifying Round
Relegation to Liga Adelante

- With Marcelino

28 August 2011 2	Sevilla	2–1	Málaga	Seville
22:00 CEST	Negredo 2', 26', (yellow card) 52'; Medel (yellow card) 53'; Cáceres (yellow card) 80'	(Report); Live TV: GolT / C+ Liga 2	(yellow card) 30' Van Nistelrooy; 81' Cazorla	Stadium: Ramón Sánchez Pizjuán; Attendance: 35,000; Referee: (Basque Country (autonomous community)) Delgado Ferreiro

10 September 2011 3	Villarreal	2–2	Sevilla	Vilarreal (Castellón)
18:00 CEST	López (red card) 23'; Rossi 33' (pen.); Ruben 71'; De Guzmán (yellow card) 74'; César (yellow card) 78'	(Report); Live TV: GolT /	23', (yellow card) 27' Negredo; (yellow card) 41' Manu; (yellow card) 60' Kanouté; (yellow card) 75', (goal) 85' Alexis	Stadium: El Madrigal; Referee: (Cantabria) F. Teixeira Vitienes

17 September 2011 4	Sevilla	1–0	Real Sociedad	Seville
22:00 CEST	Coke (yellow card) 30'; Escudé (yellow card) 44'; Kanouté 53'; Spahić (yellow card) 87'	(Report); Live TV: / TV3 / TM / / TPA	(yellow card) 5' Mariga; (yellow card) 65' De la Bella	Stadium: Ramón Sánchez Pizjuán; Referee: (Cantabria) J. A. Teixeira Vitienes

20 September 2011 5	Osasuna	0–0	Sevilla	Pamplona
20:00 CEST	Rovérsio (yellow card) 56'; Nino (yellow card) 71'; Puñal (yellow card) 73'	(Report); Live TV: GolT /	(yellow card) 9' Fazio; (yellow card) 15' Spahić	Stadium: Reyno de Navarra; Referee: (Community of Madrid) Del Cerro Grande

24 September 2011 6	Sevilla	1–0	Valencia	Seville
18:00 CEST	Kanouté 17'; Trochowski (yellow card) 47' (yellow-red card) 56'; Escudé (red card) 68'; Spahić (yellow card) 70'; Rakitić (yellow card) 85'	(Report); Live TV:	(yellow card) 24' T. Costa; (yellow card) 60' (red card) 70' Aduriz; (yellow card) 90+3' Rami	Stadium: Ramón Sánchez Pizjuán; Referee: (Asturias) Muñiz Fernández

2 October 2011 7	Atlético Madrid	0–0	Sevilla	Madrid
18:00 CEST	Turan (yellow card) 16'; Sílvio (yellow card) 31'; Godín (yellow card) 56'; Suárez (yellow card) 69'; Domínguez (yellow card) 87'	(Report); Live TV: GolT /	(yellow card) 7' Kanouté; (yellow card) 24' Coke; (yellow card) 34' Medel; (yellow card) 41' Manu; (yellow card) 42' Spahić; (yellow card) 68' Cáceres	Stadium: Vicente Calderón; Referee: (Navarre) Undiano Mallenco

16 October 2011 8	Sevilla	2–1	Sporting Gijón	Seville
22:00 CEST	Manu 15'; Navas (yellow card) 21'; Spahić (yellow card) 34'; Cáceres 57'; Rakitić (yellow card) 88'; Navarro (yellow card) 89'	(Report); Live TV: GolT /	(yellow card) 26' Botía; (yellow card) 55' Canella; 63' Barral	Stadium: Ramón Sánchez Pizjuán; Referee: (Basque Country (autonomous community)) Pérez Lasa

22 October 2011 9	Barcelona	0–0	Sevilla	Barcelona
22:00 CEST	Mascherano (yellow card) 45'; Iniesta (yellow card) 74'; Fàbregas (yellow card) 90+4'	(Report); Live TV: / TV3 / TM / / TPA	(yellow card) 41' Navas; (yellow card) 53' (yellow-red card) 90+6' Navarro; (yellow card) 56' Varas; (yellow card) 65' Medel; (yellow card) 68' Cáceres; (yellow card) 90+2' Fazio; (yellow card) 90+3' (red card) 90+4' Kanouté; (yellow card) 90+7' Escudé	Stadium: Camp Nou; Referee: (Basque Country (autonomous community)) Iturralde González

25 October 2011 10	Sevilla	2–2	Racing Santander	Seville
22:00 CEST	Manu 37', 90+2'; Negredo (yellow card) 73'	(Report); Live TV: GolT /	(yellow card) 56' Álvaro; (yellow card) 59' Cisma; 63', (yellow card) 73' Nahuelpán; 69' Jairo; (yellow card) 83' Diop	Stadium: Ramón Sánchez Pizjuán; Referee: (Catalonia) Álvarez Izquierdo

31 October 2011 11	Sevilla	1–2	Granada	Seville
21:00 CET	Manu 1'; Medel (yellow card) 28'	(Report); Live TV: GolT / C+ Liga 2	(yellow card) 6' Siqueira; 78' Geijo; 87' M. Rico	Stadium: Ramón Sánchez Pizjuán; Referee: (Valencian Community) Mateu Lahoz

5 November 2011 12	Mallorca	0–0	Sevilla	Palma
18:00 CET	Bigas (yellow card) 27'; Castro (yellow card) 30'; Tejera (yellow card) 78'; Pina (yellow card) 89'; Ramis (yellow card) 90+4'	(Report); Live TV: GolT /	(yellow card) 29' Medel; (yellow card) 57' Spahić	Stadium: Iberostar Estadi; Referee: (Cantabria) J. A. Teixeira Vitienes

20 November 2011 13	Sevilla	1–2	Athletic Bilbao	Seville
18:00 CET	Navas 14'; Navarro (yellow card) 26'; Spahić (yellow card) 87'	(Report); Live TV: GolT /	5' Iraola; (yellow card) 42', (goal) 71' De Marcos; (yellow card) 47' San José	Stadium: Ramón Sánchez Pizjuán; Referee: (Valencian Community) Ayza Gámez

27 November 2011 14	Real Zaragoza	0–1	Sevilla	Zaragoza
21:30 CET	Mateos (yellow card) 21'; Paredes (yellow card) 27'; García (yellow card) 30'; Lanzaro (yellow card) 35'; Juárez (yellow card) 63'; Juan Carlos (red card) 90'	(Report); Live TV: Canal+ 1	21' (pen.) Negredo; (yellow card) 62' Trochowski; (yellow card) 86' Armenteros	Stadium: La Romareda; Referee: (Basque Country (autonomous community)) Pérez Lasa

5 December 2011 15	Sevilla	3–0	Getafe	Seville
21:00 CET	Fazio 32'; Manu 50'; Navarro (yellow card) 69'; Medel (yellow card) 74'; Kanouté 90'	(Report); Live TV: GolT / C+ Liga 2	(yellow card) 24' Rafa; (yellow card) 64' Míchel; (yellow card) 78' Ríos; (yellow card) 88' Torres	Stadium: Ramón Sánchez Pizjuán; Referee: (Galicia (Spain)) Iglesias Villanueva

10 December 2011 16	Levante	1–0	Sevilla	Valencia
18:00 CET	Juanlu (yellow card) 44'; Nano 56'; Ballesteros (yellow card) 61'	(Report); Live TV: GolT /	(yellow card) 39' Trochowski; (yellow card) 44' Navarro; (yellow card) 74' Navas; (yellow card) 90+2' Spahić	Stadium: Ciutat de València; Referee: (Catalonia) Álvarez Izquierdo

17 December 2011 17	Sevilla	2–6	Real Madrid	Seville
22:00 CET	Rakitić (yellow card) 21'; Spahić (yellow card) 52'; Kanouté (yellow card) 64'; Navas 67'; Manu (red card) 74'; Negredo 90+1'	(Report); Live TV: / TV3 / TM / / TPA	10', 40', 83' (pen.) Ronaldo; (yellow card) 30' (yellow-red card) 45' Pepe; (yellow card) 32' Ramos; 36' Callejón; (yellow card) 44' Arbeloa; (yellow card) 53' Diarra; 65' Di María; 88' Altıntop	Stadium: Ramón Sánchez Pizjuán; Referee: (Aragon) Clos Gómez

8 January 2012 18	Rayo Vallecano	2–1	Sevilla	Madrid
12:00 CET	Michu 45+1'; Casado (yellow card) 50'; Tamudo 51'; Piti (yellow card) 69'; Arribas (yellow card) 81'; Dimanka (yellow card) 90+2'	(Report); Live TV: GolT /	(yellow card) 42' Fazio; 61', (yellow card) 70' Escudé; (yellow card) 80' Navarro; (yellow card) 90+2' Medel	Stadium: Nuevo Vallecas; Referee: (Castile and León) González González

14 January 2012 19	Sevilla	0–0	Espanyol	Seville
18:00 CET	Kanouté (yellow card) 75'	(Report); Live TV: GolT /	(yellow card) 22' Vilà; (yellow card) 33' Forlín; (yellow card) 75' Verdú; (yellow card) 77' Vázquez	Stadium: Ramón Sánchez Pizjuán; Referee: (Cantabria) F. Teixeira Vitienes

21 January 2012 1	Real Betis	1–1	Sevilla	Seville
22:00 CET	Iriney (yellow card) 18'; Beñat 25', (yellow card) 71'; Isidoro (yellow card) 59'; Nacho (yellow card) 78'; Castro (yellow card) 90'	(Report); Live TV: / TV3 / TM / TPA	(yellow card) 24' (yellow-red card) 70' Fazio; 40' Negredo	Stadium: Benito Villamarín; Referee: (Community of Madrid) Velasco Carballo

29 January 2012 21	Málaga	2–1	Sevilla	Málaga
21:30 CET	Weligton 7', (yellow card) 68'; Fernández (yellow card) 10', (goal) 19'; Sánchez (yellow card) 23'; Demichelis (yellow card) 34'; Isco (yellow card) 74' (yellow-red card) 79'	(Report); Live TV: Canal+ 1	15', (yellow card) 83' Luna; (yellow card) 20' Negredo; (yellow card) 43' Rakitić; (yellow card) 62' Spahić; (yellow card) 74' Medel; (yellow card) 83' Perotti; (yellow card) 88' Escudé	Stadium: La Rosaleda; Referee: (Asturias) Muñiz Fernández

5 February 2012 22	Sevilla	1–2	Villarreal	Seville
18:00 CET	Coke (yellow card) 27'; Bruno 32' (o.g.); Escudé (yellow card) 51'	(Report); Live TV: GolT /	21' Valero; (yellow card) 53' Soriano; (yellow card) 55' Rodríguez; (yellow card) 65', (goal) 80' Camuñas; (yellow card) 74' Cani; (yellow card) 87' (yellow-red card) 90+2' Oriol	Stadium: Ramón Sánchez Pizjuán; Referee: (Community of Madrid) Del Cerro Grande

- With Míchel

13 February 2012 23	Real Sociedad	2–0	Sevilla	San Sebastián
21:00 CET	I. Martínez (yellow card) 56'; Vela 64'; Pardo 68'	(Report); Live TV: GolT / C+ Liga 2	(yellow card) 57' Manu; (yellow card) 88' Trochowski	Stadium: Anoeta; Referee: (Galicia (Spain)) Iglesias Villanueva

18 February 2012 24	Sevilla	2–0	Osasuna	Seville
22:00 CET	Medel 15'; Fazio (yellow card) 38'; Spahić (yellow card) 59'; Palop (yellow card) 90'; Trochowski 90+3'	(Report); Live TV: / TV3 / TM / TPA	(yellow card) 10' Raitala; (yellow card) 22' Lolo; (yellow card) 32' Nino	Stadium: Ramón Sánchez Pizjuán; Referee: (Community of Madrid) Velasco Carballo

26 February 2012 25	Valencia	1–2	Sevilla	Valencia
18:00 CET	Albelda (yellow card) 5'; T. Costa 25'; Bruno (yellow card) 62'; Aduriz (yellow card) 74'	(Report); Live TV: GolT /	36', (yellow card) 90' Medel; 69' Navas; (yellow card) 81' Navarro	Stadium: Mestalla; Referee: (Cantabria) F. Teixeira Vitienes

3 March 2012 26	Sevilla	1–1	Atlético Madrid	Seville
22:00 CET	Medel (yellow card) 21'; Navarro (yellow card) 44'; Baba 53'	(Report); Live TV: / TV3 / TM / TPA	8', (yellow card) 44' Salvio; (yellow card) 12' Filipe Luís; (yellow card) 33' Tiago; (yellow card) 51' Juanfran; (yellow card) 59' Domínguez	Stadium: Ramón Sánchez Pizjuán; Referee: (Catalonia) Álvarez Izquierdo

10 March 2012 27	Sporting Gijón	1–0	Sevilla	Gijón
20:00 CET	Trejo (yellow card) 4'; Castro 32'; Colunga (yellow card) 60'; Gálvez (yellow card) 87'; Bilić (yellow card) 88'; Juan Pablo (yellow card) 90+5'; Botía (yellow card) 90+5'	(Report); Live TV: GolT / C+ Liga 2	(yellow card) 14' (yellow-red card) 90+5' Coke; (yellow card) 34' Navarro; (yellow card) 70' Escudé; (yellow card) 74' Perotti; (yellow card) 90+5' Fazio	Stadium: El Molinón; Referee: (Catalonia) Estrada Fernández

17 March 2012 28	Sevilla	0–2	Barcelona	Seville
20:00 CET	Spahić (yellow card) 16'; Escudé (yellow card) 49'; Medel (yellow card) 75'	(Report); Live TV: GolT /	17' Xavi; 24' Messi; (yellow card) 31' Piqué; (yellow card) 79' Adriano; (yellow card) 82' Pedro	Stadium: Ramón Sánchez Pizjuán; Referee: (Castile and León) González González

22 March 2012 29	Racing Santander	0–3	Sevilla	Santander
20:00 CET	Álvaro (yellow card) 25'; Christian (yellow card) 69'; Osmar (yellow card) 74'; Diop (red card) 80'; Torrejón (yellow card) 80'	(Report); Live TV: GolT /	34' Navas; (yellow card) 41' Fazio; (yellow card) 43' Navarro; 52', 90+3' Manu; (yellow card) 66' Trochowski	Stadium: El Sardinero; Referee: (Aragon) Clos Gómez

26 March 2012 30	Granada	0–3	Sevilla	Granada
21:00 CEST	Gómez (yellow card) 7'; Benítez (yellow card) 34'; Jara (yellow card) 38'; Nyom (yellow card) 84'	(Report); Live TV: GolT / C+ Liga 2	(yellow card) 15', (goal) 53', 90+3' Manu; 38' Negredo; (yellow card) 66' Navarro; (yellow card) 69' Coke; (yellow card) 85' Medel	Stadium: Nuevo Los Cármenes; Referee: (Asturias) Muñiz Fernández

2 April 2012 31	Sevilla	3–1	Mallorca	Seville
21:00 CEST	Trochowski (yellow card) 25'; Coke (yellow card) 43'; Negredo 50'; Reyes (yellow card) 55'; Manu 61'; Navas 67'; Medel (yellow card) 87'	(Report); Live TV: GolT / C+ Liga 2	(yellow card) 19' Martí; (yellow card) 33' Giménez; 73' Hemed	Stadium: Ramón Sánchez Pizjuán; Referee: (Basque Country (autonomous community)) Pérez Lasa

8 April 2012 32	Athletic Bilbao	1–0	Sevilla	Bilbao
18:00 CEST	Llorente 47'; Iraola (yellow card) 48'; Amorebieta (yellow card) 81'; Muniain (yellow card) 88'; Aurtenetxe (yellow card) 90'	(Report); Live TV: GolT /	(yellow card) 15' Kanouté; (yellow card) 40' Escudé; (yellow card) 40' Medel; (yellow card) 84' Navas	Stadium: San Mamés; Referee: (Catalonia) Álvarez Izquierdo

12 April 2012 33	Sevilla	3–0	Real Zaragoza	Seville
22:00 CEST	Fazio 10'; Navas (yellow card) 27'; Negredo 28', 43'; Luna (yellow card) 73'	(Report); Live TV: GolT / C+ Liga 2	(yellow card) 21' Pintér; (yellow card) 44' Paredes; (yellow card) 73' Mateos	Stadium: Ramón Sánchez Pizjuán; Referee: (Cantabria) F. Teixeira Vitienes

16 April 2012 34	Getafe	5–1	Sevilla	Getafe (Madrid)
21:00 CEST	Torres 35', (yellow card) 35'; Lacen 48'; Miku 63', 70'; Ríos 68'; Casquero (yellow card) 86'	(Report); Live TV: GolT / C+ Liga 2	19' Negredo; (yellow card) 42' Trochowski; (yellow card) 49' Navarro	Stadium: Coliseum Alfonso Pérez; Referee: (Castile and León) Turienzo Álvarez

21 April 2012 35	Sevilla	1–1	Levante	Seville
22:30 CEST	Escudé (yellow card) 19'; Negredo 21'; Medel (yellow card) 40'; Manu (yellow card) 89'	(Report); Live TV: / TV3 / TM / TPA	(yellow card) 18' Iborra; 29', (yellow card) 29' Koné; (yellow card) 85' Venta; (yellow card) 88' Valdo; (yellow card) 90+2' El Zhar	Stadium: Ramón Sánchez Pizjuán; Referee: (Community of Madrid) Velasco Carballo

29 April 2012 36	Real Madrid	3–0	Sevilla	Madrid
12:00 CEST	Ronaldo 19'; Özil (yellow card) 24'; Benzema 48', 51'; Granero (yellow card) 54'; Di María (yellow card) 59'	(Report); Live TV: GolT /	(yellow card) 53' Deivid; (yellow card) 57' Cala	Stadium: Santiago Bernabéu; Referee: (Valencian Community) Mateu Lahoz

2 May 2012 20	Sevilla	1–2	Real Betis	Seville
20:00 CEST	Negredo 18', (yellow card) 38'; Fazio (yellow card) 44'; Trochowski (yellow card) 70'; Medel (yellow card) 81' (yellow-red card) 90+2'	(Report); Live TV: Canal+ 1	(yellow card) 33', (goal) 42', 90+3' Beñat; (yellow card) 72' Dorado; (yellow card) 75' Montero; (yellow card) 90' Cañas	Stadium: Ramón Sánchez Pizjuán; Referee: (Basque Country (autonomous community)) Delgado Ferreiro

5 May 2012 37	Sevilla	5–2	Rayo Vallecano	Seville
21:00 CEST	Baba 30', 46'; Cala 42', (yellow card) 51'; Reyes 65'; Kanouté 81', (yellow card) 81'; Guarente (yellow card) 86'	(Report); Live TV: Abono Fútbol 4 / C+ Liga 2 (connections)	(yellow card) 16' Pulido; (yellow card) 17' Delibašić; (yellow card) 25', (goal) 36' (pen.), 76' Costa; (yellow card) 44' Cobeño; (yellow card) 82' Trashorras	Stadium: Ramón Sánchez Pizjuán; Referee: (Castile and León) Turienzo Álvarez

13 May 2012 38	Espanyol	1–1	Sevilla	Cornellà de Llobregat (Barcelona)
20:00 CEST	Sánchez (yellow card) 14'; Verdú (yellow card) 54'; Coutinho 76'; López (yellow card) 83'; Pandiani (yellow card) 88'	(Report); Live TV: Abono Fútbol 4 / C+ Liga 2 (connections)	(yellow card) 16' Deivid; (yellow card) 23' Coke; 45+2' Negredo	Stadium: Cornellà-El Prat; Referee: (Asturias) Muñiz Fernández

=== UEFA Europa League ===
==== Fourth Qualifying Round ====
18 August 2011 First leg	Hannover 96 (Germany)	2–1	(Spain) Sevilla	Hannover
20:30 CEST	Schlaudraff 6', 45'; Schulz (yellow card) 64'; Stindl (yellow card) 87'	(Report); Live TV: Canal Sur	37' Kanouté; (yellow card) 54' Navarro; (yellow card) 72' Fazio	Stadium: AWD-Arena; Attendance: 49,000; Referee: (Netherlands) Bas Nijhuis

25 August 2011 Second leg	Sevilla (Spain)	1–1	(Germany) Hannover 96	Seville
21:05 CEST	Alexis (yellow card) 7'; Perotti (yellow card) 20'; Pogatetz 36' (o.g.); Kanouté (yellow card) 50'; Medel (yellow card) 65' (red card) 90'; Manu (yellow card) 76'	(Report); Live TV: Canal Sur / SFC Televisión	22' Abdellaoue; (yellow card) 44' Stindl; (yellow card) 49' Cherundolo; (yellow card) 54' Schulz; (yellow card) 56' Schlaudraff; (yellow card) 71' Rausch; (yellow card) 74' Schmiedebach	Stadium: Ramón Sánchez Pizjuán; Attendance: 45,000; Referee: (Belgium) Serge Gumienny

Hannover 96 won 3–2 on aggregate.

=== Copa del Rey ===
==== Round of 32 ====
13 December 2011 First leg	San Roque Lepe	0–1	Sevilla	Lepe (Huelva)
22:00 CET	Arroyo (yellow card) 18'; Rubio (yellow card) 19'; Rojas (yellow card) 66'; Cheikh (yellow card) 87'	(Report); Live TV: GolT /	12', (yellow card) 43' Kanouté; (yellow card) 43' Medel; (yellow card) 78' Coke	Stadium: Ciudad de Lepe; Attendance: 10,000; Referee: (Community of Madrid) Velasco Carballo

20 December 2011 Second leg	Sevilla	2–1	San Roque Lepe	Seville
22:00 CET	Kanouté (yellow card) 51', (goal) 52' (pen.), 60'; Luna (yellow card) 64'; Campaña (yellow card) 65'	(Report); Live TV: GolT /	(yellow card) 50' Albentosa; 78' Adri	Stadium: Ramón Sánchez Pizjuán; Attendance: 2,500; Referee: (Cantabria) F. Teixeira Vitienes

Sevilla FC won 3–1 on aggregate.

==== Round of 16 ====
5 January 2012 First leg	Valencia	1–0	Sevilla	Valencia
22:00 CET	Jonas 32'; Ruiz (yellow card) 37'; Soldado (yellow card) 44'; Albelda (yellow card) 58'; Feghouli (yellow card) 84'	(Report); Live TV: GolT /	(yellow card) 21' Spahić; (yellow card) 26' Trochowski; (yellow card) 34' Medel; (yellow card) 34' Navas; (yellow card) 74' Cáceres; (yellow card) 85' Luis Alberto	Stadium: Mestalla; Attendance: 37,000; Referee: (Castile and León) Turienzo Alvarez

11 January 2012 Second leg	Sevilla	2–1	Valencia	Seville
22:00 CET	Navarro (yellow card) 18'; Cáceres (yellow card) 59'; Rakitić 69', (yellow card) 81'; Ruiz 90+2' (o.g.)	(Report); Live TV: GolT /	(yellow card) 12' Miguel; (yellow card) 21' Albelda; (yellow card) 36' Rami; (yellow card) 53' Mathieu; 66' Soldado; (yellow card) 80' Feghouli; (yellow card) 85' Alba; (yellow card) 90+3' Alves	Stadium: Ramón Sánchez Pizjuán; Referee: (Cantabria) J. A. Teixeira Vitienes

Valencia 2–2 Sevilla on aggregate. Valencia won on away goals.

== Others ==
=== AFE strike for the first two matchdays ===
On 11 August, the Spanish Players' Union, called AFE (Asociación de Futbolistas Españoles, in English, Association of Spanish Footballers) published by a press conference the official announcement of a strike for the first two matchdays of Liga BBVA and Liga Adelante (valid between 11 and 29 August) due to the existence of more than 50 professional footballers who do not charge, a greater number of footballers to whom there's still owed the share of wages in previous months and years and also the existence of discrepancies in the collective agreement. LFP (Liga de Fútbol Profesional), the patronal, grouping the 42 clubs in both categories of Spanish professional football did not understand at first this strike. LFP tried to resolve but it could not help that the opening matchday (to be played the weekend of 20 August) was not played. Seeing that the positions of both parties walked away, LFP began to convene several meetings to negotiate. After 7 meetings, on the morning of 25 August was announced that the strike had been called off thanks to an agreement in principle different AFE requests, among which the extension of a wage guarantee fund that would prevent, or try to avoid a strongest non-payment to the players.
AFE also ceded its claims about the controversial schedules of footballers' holiday, and also said to LFP that they would be able to re-play matchday 1 matches, suspended in the beginning. AFE president, Luis Rubiales, first told to press that these matches wouldn't be played, or in August or ever, talking about a "37-matchdays-Liga BBVA" and a "41-matchdays-Liga Adelante". José Luis Astiazarán, LFP president, announced at the end the calendar reform of both competitions, placing:

- Liga BBVA matchday 1 on the dates assigned for the matchday 20; and matchday 20 between days 1, 2 and 3 May 2012.
- Liga Adelante matchday 1 on 25, 26 and 27 October 2011.

=== 4th Champions for Africa ===
Another year, and for the fourth consecutive time, Frédéric Kanouté and his foundation, along with support from UNICEF and other agencies and corporations, have organized this solidary Christmas friendly match in order to help children in Africa, especially Somalia and surrounding nations, in areas such as health and education. This time, Valencia have loaned its stadium, Mestalla, so as to help in this cause. The game was played by two teams composed by players from Liga BBVA, Liga Adelante and some famous people such as the motorcycle road racer Héctor Faubel. One of them, "Africa United", composed mostly by African players, was led by Juan Ignacio Martínez (Levante coach) and Juan Carlos Garrido (former Villarreal coach), and the other one, called "Selección Champions" (in English, Champions Team) and not "Liga BBVA XI" as on previous editions because of the absence of players from Real Madrid and Barcelona and the inclusion of players from the Liga Adelante, which was led by Unai Emery, Valencia coach.

29 December 2011	Selección Champions	14–14	Africa United	Valencia
20:15 CET	Soldado 11', 22'; Novo 29'; B. García 38'; Faubel 44'; Quini 47', 51', 60'; Míchel 54'; Alcácer 62', 66', 74', 77'; Romero 82'	TV: (deferred at 20:45)	8', 19', 56' Linares; 50', 53', 64', 88', 89' Bodipo; 58' Aníbal; 69', 79' Pato; 72' Mosquera; 85', 86' Juanmi	Stadium: Mestalla; Referee: (Valencian Community) Mateu Lahoz
