= Gonzalo Suárez (disambiguation) =

Gonzalo Suárez may refer to:

- Gonzalo Suárez Rendón (1503–1590), Spanish conquistador
  - Casa del Fundador Gonzalo Suárez Rendón, museum in Colombia named after the conquistador
- Gonzalo Suárez (1934–2026), Spanish filmmaker
- Gonzo Suárez (born 1963), Spanish video game director
- Gonzalo Suárez (footballer) (born 1994), Spanish footballer
