= Gary Medel =

Chilean footballer (born 1987)

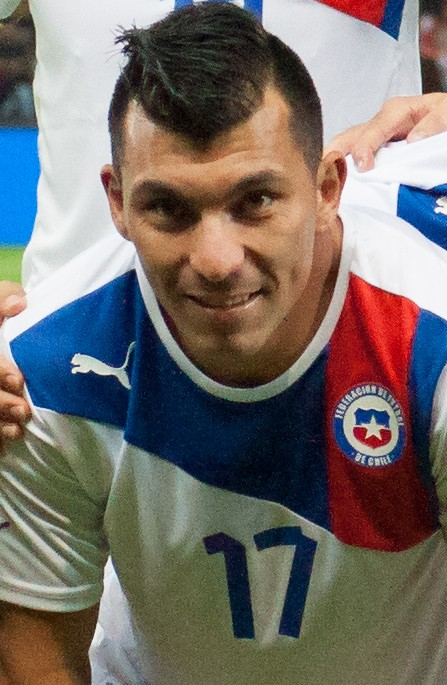
- Medel with Chile in 2013

Personal information
- Full name: Gary Alexis Medel Soto
- Date of birth: 3 August 1987 (age 39)
- Place of birth: Santiago, Chile
- Height: 1.71 m (5 ft 7 in)
- Positions: Defensive midfielder; defender

Team information
- Current team: Universidad Católica
- Number: 17

Youth career
- 1997–2006: Universidad Católica

Senior career*
Years	Team	Apps	(Gls)
2006–2009	Universidad Católica	68	(10)
2009–2011	Boca Juniors	46	(7)
2011–2013	Sevilla	78	(8)
2013–2014	Cardiff City	34	(0)
2014–2017	Inter Milan	91	(1)
2017–2019	Beşiktaş	51	(1)
2019–2023	Bologna	96	(0)
2023–2024	Vasco da Gama	30	(0)
2024–2025	Boca Juniors	9	(0)
2025–	Universidad Católica	32	(0)

International career
2007	Chile U20	15	(0)
2008	Chile U23	8	(0)
2007–2023	Chile	161	(7)
Medal record
Men's football
Representing Chile
Copa América
Winner	2015 Chile
Winner	2016 United States
FIFA Confederations Cup
Runner-up	2017 Russia
FIFA U-20 World Cup
Third place	2007 Canada
- * Club domestic league appearances and goals as of 22:17, 22 October 2026 (UTC)

Gary Alexis Medel Soto (Spanish pronunciation: [ˈɡaɾi meˈðel]; born 3 August 1987) is a Chilean professional footballer who plays for Chilean Primera División club Universidad Católica as a centre-back and a defensive midfielder.

Medel has played club football with several teams in numerous countries, starting out with Chilean side Universidad Católica, and later playing for Argentine side Boca Juniors, Spanish side Sevilla, Premier League side Cardiff City, and Italian side Inter Milan, before moving to Beşiktaş in Turkey in 2017. He then moved back to Italy and joined Bologna in 2019.

A full Chilean international with over 160 caps since 2007, Medel has represented the nation at two FIFA World Cups, five Copa América tournaments, and one edition of the FIFA Confederations Cup. He was part of the squad that won the 2015 Copa América (where he was named in the Team of the tournament) and the Copa América Centenario (2016). He was also included in squads that finished fourth at the 2019 Copa América and as the runners-up at the 2017 Confederations Cup.

== Club career ==
=== Early career in South America ===
Medel joined Universidad Católica at the age of 12. His youth team coach Mario Lepe put his name forward to join the senior ranks.

On 20 July 2009, he joined Boca Juniors on an initial loan for US$300,000 with the option to buy for $2.5 million, with Damián Díaz being sent in the opposite direction. Medel said of the move "This is a dream come true. It is a very important club, and one which has players which I admire a lot, Juan Román Riquelme, Martín Palermo and Sebastián Battaglia. He is my idol and has me very happy to play by his side". Medel scored both goals in a 2–0 win in the Superclásico against River Plate on 25 March 2010.

Before he joined Sevilla, his farewell match with Boca was a friendly against River in Mar del Plata. He came on in the 77th minute of the 2–0 win.

=== Sevilla ===
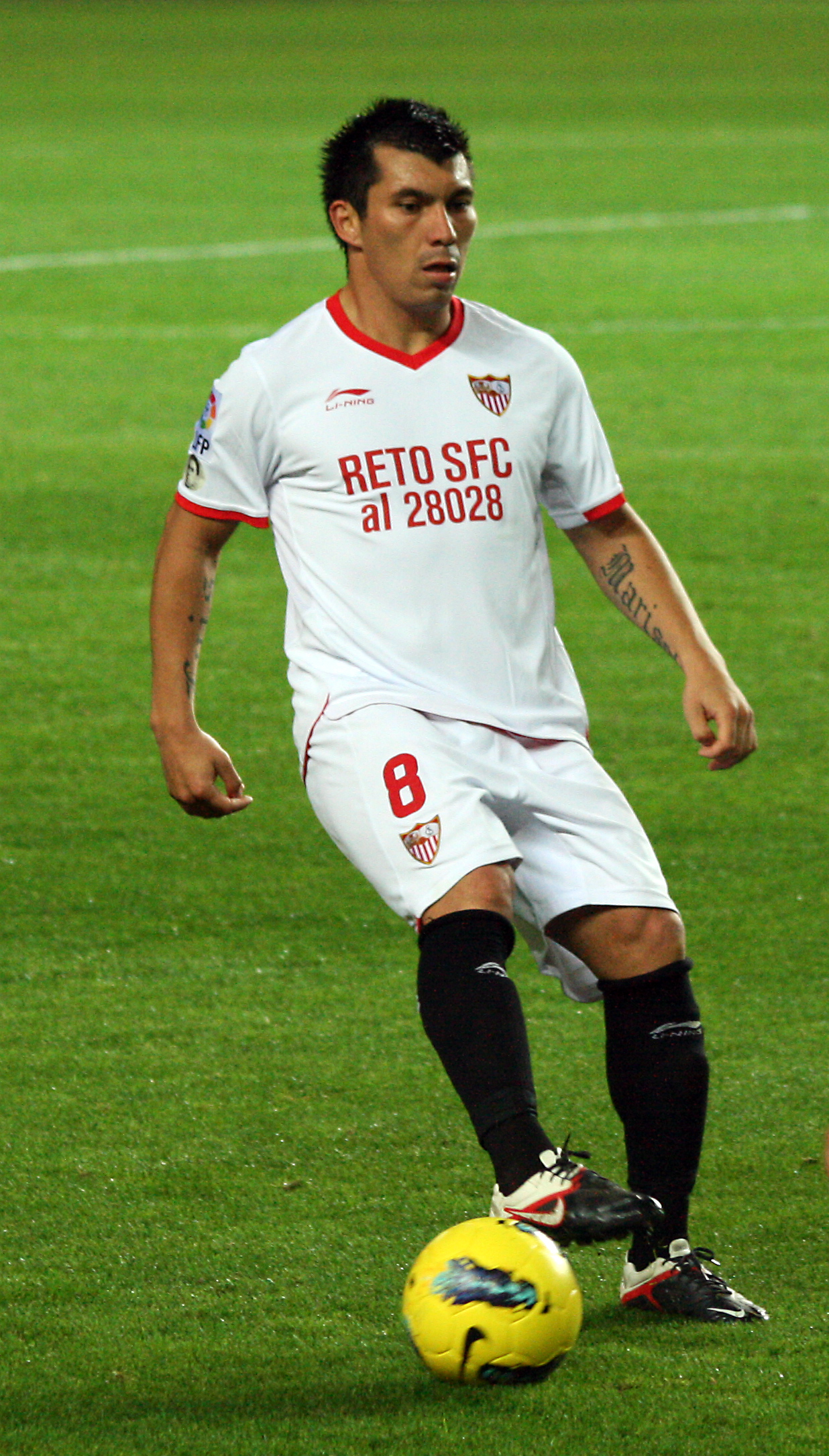
Medel playing for Sevilla in 2011

Medel joined Sevilla for €3 million on 28 January 2011, on a 4 1/2-year contract, on the same day as the club also signed Ivan Rakitić for their central midfield. He said "I am happy to be here, I hope that everything goes well. I'm a player who puts a lot into my heart on the pitch, I hope that with my playing that I can contribute to Sevilla".

On 12 February, he made his La Liga debut, playing all 90 minutes of a 3–2 away defeat at Racing Santander. He helped Sevilla to a 1–1 draw against FC Barcelona at home on 12 March, clearing the ball off the line twice, the second on an attempt by Lionel Messi.

=== Cardiff City ===
On 11 August 2013, Cardiff City confirmed that they had signed Medel from Sevilla for a club record £11 million fee on a four-year deal. He made his debut for the club on 17 August, in a 2–0 defeat against West Ham United. He made his home debut at the Cardiff City Stadium on 25 August, in a 3–2 win against Manchester City. Medel played all 90 minutes and received the fans' man of the match award.

=== Inter Milan ===
After Cardiff's relegation, Medel joined Italian club Inter Milan for a reported £10 million fee on 9 August 2014. The fee, which was £1 million less than what Cardiff had signed Medel for, was criticised by former striker Nathan Blake, but was justified by Cardiff manager Ole Gunnar Solskjær. Medel made his Serie A debut for Inter on 31 August as they began the season with a goalless draw at Torino, playing the full 90 minutes.

On 31 October 2015, Medel scored his first goal for Inter to give the Nerazzurri a 1–0 victory over Scudetto rivals Roma at the Stadio Giuseppe Meazza.

On 23 October 2016, in the 2–1 away defeat at Atalanta, Medel hit Jasmin Kurtić in the face with his left arm, an incident that was not spotted by the referee. A day later, however, he was banned for three league games by Lega Serie A after examining TV images.

On 20 November 2016, in the Derby della Madonnina against cross-town rivals A.C. Milan, Medel played as centre-back for 37 minutes before replaced by Jeison Murillo due to a knee injury. Following the match, which ended in a 2–2 draw, it was confirmed that Medel had damaged his lateral meniscus and would be sidelined until January 2017.

Medel returned to action on 28 January by playing in Inter's 3–0 home defeat of Pescara. Later on 12 March, he made his 100th appearance for Inter as the Nerazzurri beat Atalanta 7–1 at home.

=== Beşiktaş ===
On 11 August 2017, Medel signed for Süper Lig champions Beşiktaş for a reported €3 million. He signed a three-year contract.

=== Bologna ===
On 29 August 2019, Medel signed a three-year contract with Serie A club Bologna for a reported fee of €2.5 million. He debuted for Bologna against rivals SPAL on 30 August 2019.

=== Vasco da Gama ===
In July 2023, he returned to South America and signed with Brazilian Série A side Vasco da Gama.

=== Boca Juniors ===
In June 2024, he returned to Boca Juniors.

Still a player of Boca Juniors, Medel graduated as a football manager at INAF (National Institute of Football, Sports and Physical Activity of Chile) in December 2024.

=== Back to Chile ===
On 9 January 2025, Universidad Católica announced his return on a one-year deal.

== International career ==
=== U20 and early senior career ===
In March 2007, Medel made his international debut for Chile in a friendly against Argentina. Later that year, he played a key role in Chile's third-place finish in the U-20 World Cup held in Canada. He was sent off in the semi-final match against Argentina, when he kicked Gabriel Mercado in the 24th minute and was suspended for the third-place play-off. Medel claimed that he was tasered by police after the match.

He made his competitive debut for Chile in the 2010 FIFA World Cup qualification match against Bolivia in a 2–0 victory at the Estadio Hernando Siles in La Paz, scoring both goals, the first being a bicycle kick. Medel played an important role in Chile's qualification for the 2010 FIFA World Cup, playing as a central defender or right back. He started in the three group-stage matches at the World Cup finals in South Africa, but was suspended for the round of 16 match against Brazil, where la Roja were eliminated.

He was named in Chile's squad for the 2011 Copa América, featuring in all three group matches, the first two as a starter. In the quarter-final match against Venezuela in San Juan, Argentina, he was sent off for handball and Chile lost 2–1.

=== 2014 World Cup ===
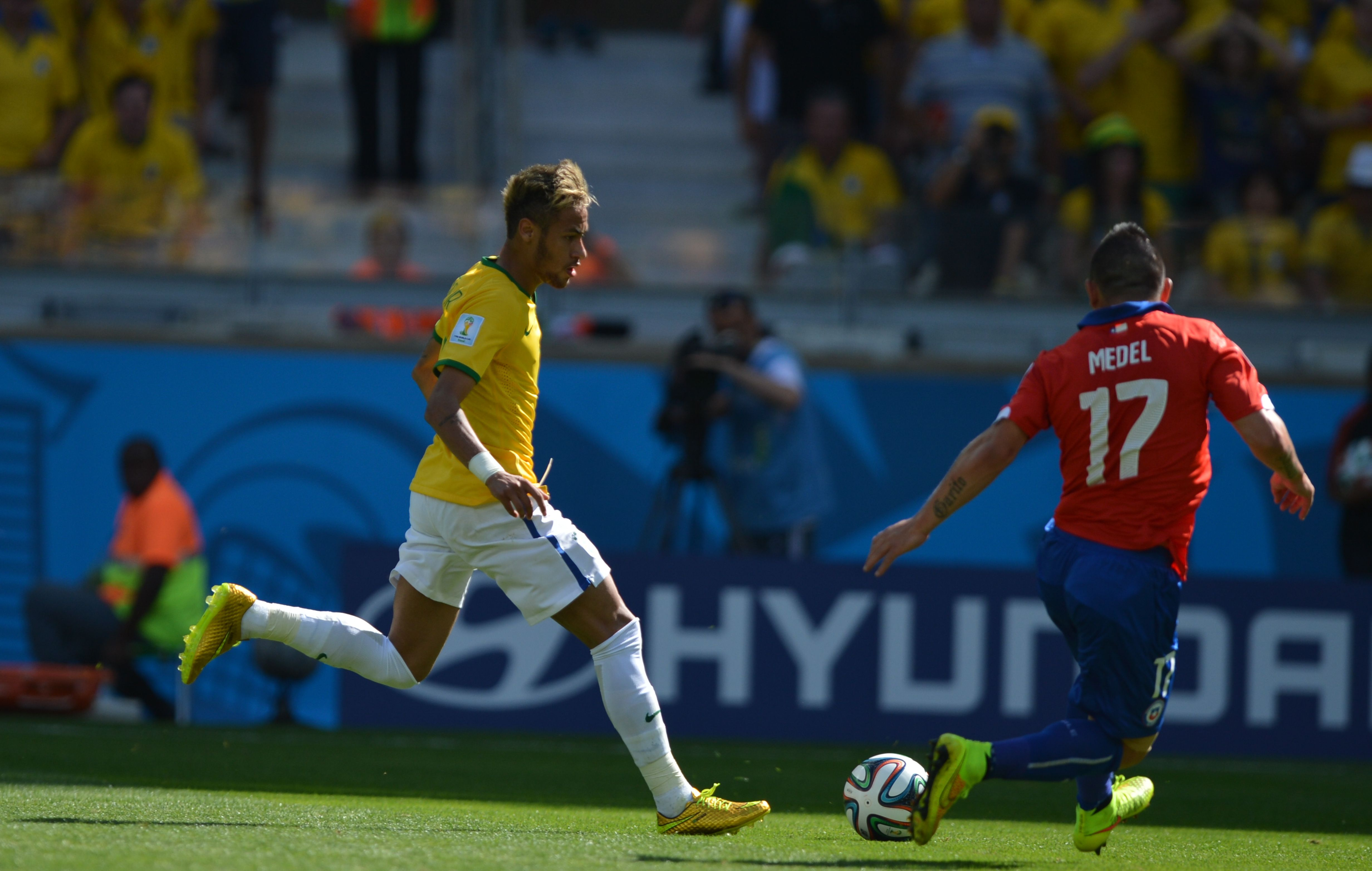
Medel in action against Neymar of Brazil at World Cup 2014

Medel played a key role in 2014 FIFA World Cup qualification, scoring the goal that secured qualification for the 2014 FIFA World Cup, heading a goal against Ecuador. Medel captained Chile in a 1–0 friendly defeat to Germany on 5 March 2014. He was one of 23 players who were called up by coach Jorge Sampaoli to play in 2014 FIFA World Cup in Brazil. Medel played as a starter alongside Gonzalo Jara in the center of defense, for Chile who beat Australia 3–1 in Cuiabá to get their first three points of the World Cup campaign. He also played a full 90 minutes in second match against the reigning world champions Spain, with Chile getting a historic 2–0 win. Spain's loss sealed the qualification of both Chile and the Netherlands to the knockout stage, and eliminated both Spain and Australia. Spain became the fifth defending champion to be knocked out in the group stage. Medel played 90 minutes in the final group match against the Netherlands who won 2–0 and won the group, while Chile finished Group B as runner-up with six points. Chile was eliminated in the round of 16 against the same team that eliminated them in last tournament, Brazil, but this time, Brazil advanced to the quarter-finals by winning on penalty shootout.

=== 2015 Copa América ===
At the 2015 Copa América, held in Chile, Medel scored during a 5–0 win against Bolivia which ensured that La Roja would progress to the knockout stage as Group A winners. In the semi-final against Peru, he scored an own goal from Luis Advíncula's cross to equalise, but Chile advanced to the final winning 2–1. In the final against Argentina, Medel played as a starter and helped the team to win the trophy on penalty kicks, after the regular time ended in a goalless draw. Medel became the fourth most capped player with 80 matches, equaling his defense partner Gonzalo Jara. That was Medel's first major trophy with Chile. For his performances he was named in the Team of the tournament.

=== 2017 FIFA Confederations Cup ===
In June 2017, Medel was named in the 2017 FIFA Confederations Cup squad in Chile's first ever participation. On 13 June, in the friendly against Romania, Medel received a red-card in 33rd minute as Chile slumped into a 3–2 away defeat. It was his fourth red-card with the national team in 99 appearances. He captained Chile in the first two Group B matches against Cameroon and Germany due to Claudio Bravo's injury, also earning his 100th cap in the process, becoming the fourth Chile player to achieve the feat. Then he was rested for the final group match as Chile achieved a second-place which allowed them to go to knockout stage.

=== 2019 Copa América ===
In the third-place match of the 2019 Copa América against Argentina on 6 July, Medel was sent off along with Lionel Messi in the 37th minute of play, after being involved in an altercation with the Argentine; Chile lost the match 2–1.

== Style of play ==
Medel usually plays as a defensive midfielder; however, he is also capable of playing as a defender, and has even been deployed as a centre-back throughout his career, as well as in other midfield roles, or even as a right-back. Due to his work-rate, physicality, tenacity, tactical intelligence, and his aggressive, hard-tackling style of play, as well as his leadership on the pitch, he is nicknamed Pitbull. In 2015, manager Roberto Mancini described Medel as a warrior.

== Career statistics ==
=== Club ===
As of match played 23 August 2026

Appearances and goals by club, season and competition
Club	Season	League			National cup (Note: Includes Copa Chile, Copa del Rey, FA Cup, Coppa Italia, Turkish Cup, Copa do Brasil)		State league (Note: Includes Campeonato Carioca, Copa de la Liga)		Continental		Other		Total	
Club	Season	Division	Apps	Goals	Apps	Goals	Apps	Goals	Apps	Goals	Apps	Goals	Apps	Goals
Universidad Católica	2006	Chilean Primera División	1	0	—		—		—		—		1	0
Universidad Católica	2007	Chilean Primera División	25	4	—		—		—		—		25	4
Universidad Católica	2008	Chilean Primera División	31	5	—		—		12 (Note: Appearances in Copa Sudamericana)	1	—		43	6
Universidad Católica	2009	Chilean Primera División	13	1	—		—		0	0	—		13	1
Universidad Católica	Total		70	10	—		—		12	1	—		82	11
Boca Juniors	2009–10	Argentine Primera División	29	7	—		—		2 (Note: Appearances in Copa Libertadores)	0	—		31	7
Boca Juniors	2010–11	Argentine Primera División	17	0	—		—		0	0	—		17	0
Boca Juniors	Total		46	7	—		—		2	0	—		48	7
Sevilla	2010–11	La Liga	15	0	1	0	—		2 (Note: Appearances in UEFA Champions League)	0	—		18	0
Sevilla	2011–12	La Liga	31	2	4	0	—		2 (Note: Appearances in UEFA Europa League)	0	—		37	2
Sevilla	2012–13	La Liga	32	6	7	1	—		—		—		39	7
Sevilla	Total		78	8	12	1	—		4	0	—		94	9
Cardiff City	2013–14	Premier League	34	0	1	0	—		—		—		35	0
Inter Milan	2014–15	Serie A	35	0	2	0	—		7	0	—		44	0
Inter Milan	2015–16	Serie A	30	1	4	0	—		—		—		34	1
Inter Milan	2016–17	Serie A	26	0	2	0	—		3	0	—		31	0
Inter Milan	Total		91	1	8	0	—		10	0	—		109	1
Beşiktaş	2017–18	Süper Lig	25	1	7	0	—		8	0	—		40	1
Beşiktaş	2018–19	Süper Lig	24	0	0	0	—		11	0	—		35	0
Beşiktaş	2019–20	Süper Lig	2	0	0	0	—		0	0	—		2	0
Beşiktaş	Total		51	1	7	0	—		19	0	—		77	1
Bologna	2019–20	Serie A	23	0	1	0	—		—		—		24	0
Bologna	2020–21	Serie A	11	0	1	0	—		—		—		12	0
Bologna	2021–22	Serie A	33	0	1	0	—		—		—		34	0
Bologna	2022–23	Serie A	29	0	2	0	—		—		—		31	0
Bologna	Total		96	0	5	0	—		—		—		101	0
Vasco da Gama	2023	Série A	20	0	0	0	—		—		—		20	0
Vasco da Gama	2024	Série A	2	0	2	0	8	0	—		—		12	0
Vasco da Gama	Total		22	0	2	0	8	0	—		—		32	0
Boca Juniors	2024	Argentine Primera División	9	0	0	0	—		2	0	—		11	0
Universidad Católica	2025	Chilean Primera División	22	0	5	0	—		—		—		27	0
Universidad Católica	2026	Chilean Primera División	10	0	0	0	3	0	4	0	2 (Note: Appearances in Supercopa de Chile)	0	19	0
Universidad Católica	Total		32	0	5	0	3	0	4	0	2	0	46	0
Career total			529	27	40	1	11	0	53	0	2	0	634	29

=== International ===
Appearances and goals by national team and year
National team	Year	Apps	Goals
Chile	2007	2	0
Chile	2008	10	2
Chile	2009	9	1
Chile	2010	7	0
Chile	2011	13	1
Chile	2012	5	0
Chile	2013	12	1
Chile	2014	13	1
Chile	2015	14	1
Chile	2016	12	0
Chile	2017	12	0
Chile	2018	7	0
Chile	2019	10	0
Chile	2020	0	0
Chile	2021	15	0
Chile	2022	11	0
Chile	2023	9	0
Total		161	7

Scores and results list Chile's goal tally first, score column indicates score after each Medel goal.

List of international goals scored by Gary Medel
No.	Date	Venue	Opponent	Score	Result	Competition
1	15 June 2008	Estadio Hernando Siles, La Paz, Bolivia	Bolivia	1–0	2–0	2010 FIFA World Cup qualification
2	15 June 2008	Estadio Hernando Siles, La Paz, Bolivia	Bolivia	2–0	2–0	2010 FIFA World Cup qualification
3	29 May 2009	Fukuda Denshi Arena, Chiba, Japan	Belgium	1–1	1–1	2009 Kirin Cup
4	11 October 2011	Estadio Monumental, Santiago, Chile	Peru	3–0	4–2	2014 FIFA World Cup qualification
5	15 October 2013	Estadio Nacional de Chile, Santiago, Chile	Ecuador	2–0	2–1	2014 FIFA World Cup qualification
6	10 October 2014	Estadio Elías Figueroa, Valparaíso, Chile	Peru	2–0	3–0	Friendly
7	19 June 2015	Estadio Nacional de Chile, Santiago, Chile	Bolivia	4–0	5–0	2015 Copa América

== Honours ==
Chile

- Copa América: 2015, 2016

Individual

- Chilean Footballer of the Year: 2008
- Universidad Católica Footballer of the year: 2008
- Team of Copa Libertadores : 2008
- Team of year in South America: 2009
- Copa América Team of the Tournament: 2015, 2016

== See also ==
- List of footballers with 100 or more caps
