= Federico Fazio =

Argentine footballer (born 1987)

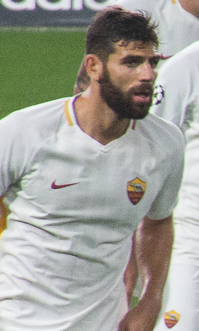
- Fazio playing for Roma in 2017

Personal information
- Full name: Federico Julián Fazio
- Date of birth: 17 March 1987 (age 39)
- Place of birth: Buenos Aires, Argentina
- Height: 1.95 m (6 ft 5 in)
- Position: Centre-back

Youth career
- Ferro Carril Oeste

Senior career*
Years	Team	Apps	(Gls)
2005–2006	Ferro Carril Oeste	48	(3)
2007	Sevilla B	20	(2)
2007–2014	Sevilla	148	(12)
2014–2017	Tottenham Hotspur	20	(0)
2016	→ Sevilla (loan)	4	(0)
2016–2017	→ Roma (loan)	37	(2)
2017–2022	Roma	90	(9)
2022–2024	Salernitana	47	(3)
Total		414	(31)

International career
2006–2007	Argentina U20	13	(1)
2008	Argentina U23	2	(0)
2011–2018	Argentina	10	(1)
Medal record
Men's football
Representing Argentina
FIFA U-20 World Cup
Winner	2007	U-20 Team
Olympic Games
Gold medal – first place	2008	Team
- * Club domestic league appearances and goals

Federico Julián Fazio (born 17 March 1987) is an Argentine former professional footballer who played as a central defender.

He began his career at Ferro Carril Oeste, signing for Sevilla in 2007. He made 204 official appearances for the latter club in nine years and scored 15 goals, joining Tottenham Hotspur in August 2014 and subsequently returning to Sevilla on loan. In August 2016, he was loaned to Italian Serie A side Roma, agreeing to a permanent contract one year later.

Fazio made his debut for Argentina in 2011, and represented the country at the 2018 World Cup.

== Club career ==
=== Sevilla ===
Born in Buenos Aires, Fazio started his career in the Primera Nacional with Ferro Carril Oeste in 2005. He was bought by Spanish club Sevilla FC in late January 2007 and spent the vast majority of the remaining season with the reserves, which he helped to achieve promotion to Segunda División. He made his first-team debut on 9 May 2007, as a substitute for Julien Escudé in a 2–0 home win against Deportivo de La Coruña in the semi-finals of the Copa del Rey.

Fazio started 2007–08 registered with both teams; however, due to the absences of Javi Navarro (knee, entire campaign missed) and Escudé (pubis, less than half of possible games), he ended up playing an important part on a side that finished fifth in La Liga. His first competitive start took place on 15 August 2007 in the 2–0 home victory over AEK Athens F.C. in the third qualifying round of the UEFA Champions League. Four days later, he played the full 90 minutes of a 5–3 defeat of Real Madrid at the Santiago Bernabéu Stadium to win the Supercopa de España. His first league appearance came on 25 August in the season opener, a 4–1 home win over Getafe CF.

On 7 May 2008, Fazio scored his first goal for Sevilla in a 3–0 victory at Racing de Santander. He added another in that match, and a third a week later in a 2–0 home win against Real Betis; in both games, he played as a defensive midfielder.

In his second year, they finished third but Fazio featured slightly less and saw time at both positions. He was mostly injured during the following season, making only ten league appearances (on 13 March 2010, he headed home in a 1–1 home draw against Deportivo). The Andalusians ended the league in fourth place, also winning the domestic cup, but he was not picked for the final of the latter competition itself.

Still bothered with some physical problems in 2010–11, Fazio played the most he had in years, appearing in 19 matches – 17 starts – as Sevilla ranked fifth and qualified for the Europa League.

=== Tottenham Hotspur ===
Fazio signed for Tottenham Hotspur on 26 August 2014 for a fee of £8 million, on a four-year contract. On 18 October he started on his Premier League debut at Manchester City, but was given a straight red card for denying Sergio Agüero a goalscoring opportunity in the penalty area, in an eventual 4–1 defeat. On 6 November he met the same fate, after conceding a penalty with a foul on Jerónimo Barrales in the closing stages of a 2–1 away win over Asteras Tripolis F.C. in the Europa League group stage.

=== Sevilla return ===
On 31 January 2016, after only one competitive game in the first part of the season (a 1–2 home loss to Arsenal in the League Cup) Fazio returned to Sevilla on a five-month loan. He was sent off after just 24 minutes on his debut for two bookable offences, in a 1–1 away draw with RC Celta de Vigo.

The decision to hand Fazio the number 16 shirt was controversial, as convention had previously been for only homegrown players to wear the number that Antonio Puerta wore when he died playing for the team in 2007.

=== Roma ===
On 3 August 2016, Fazio was loaned to AS Roma, with the Italians having the possibility of buying outright at the end of the campaign for €3.2 million. He made his Serie A debut 17 days later, playing ten minutes in a 4–0 home win over Udinese Calcio. A permanent deal was agreed on 15 July 2017.

Fazio tested positive for COVID-19 in November 2020. After the arrival of new manager José Mourinho, he did not receive any playing time and was ultimately made to train on his own; as a result, he took legal action against the club.

=== Salernitana ===
On 29 January 2022, shortly after initially rejecting an offer, Fazio signed a 2.5-year contract with US Salernitana 1919.

== International career ==
Fazio was an integral part of the Argentina under-20 team that won the FIFA World Cup in 2007. The following year, he helped the Olympic team win gold at the Summer Olympics in Beijing: he played twice in the tournament, as backup for Nicolás Pareja and Ezequiel Garay.

On 1 June 2011, Fazio made his debut for the full side, appearing in a 4–1 friendly defeat in Nigeria. He scored his first goal for his country in another exhibition game, opening an eventual 6–0 win in Singapore on 13 June 2017.

Fazio was selected by manager Jorge Sampaoli for his 2018 FIFA World Cup squad. He made his debut in the competition on 30 June, coming on as a 46th-minute substitute for Marcos Rojo in a 4–3 round-of-16 loss against France.

== Career statistics ==
=== Club ===
Appearances and goals by club, season and competition
Club	Season	League			National cup		League cup		Continental		Other		Total	
Club	Season	Division	Apps	Goals	Apps	Goals	Apps	Goals	Apps	Goals	Apps	Goals	Apps	Goals
Ferro Carril Oeste	2006–07	Primera Nacional	17	0	0	0	—		—		—		17	0
Sevilla	2006–07	La Liga	0	0	1	0	–		0	0	0	0	1	0
Sevilla	2007–08	La Liga	22	3	2	1	–		4 (Note: Appearances in UEFA Champions League)	0	1 (Note: Appearance in Supercopa de España)	0	29	4
Sevilla	2008–09	La Liga	16	0	3	0	–		3 (Note: Appearances in UEFA Cup)	0	–		22	0
Sevilla	2009–10	La Liga	10	1	1	0	–		2	0	–		13	1
Sevilla	2010–11	La Liga	19	1	0	0	–		5 (Note: Two appearances in UEFA Champions League, three appearances in UEFA Europa League)	0	1	0	25	1
Sevilla	2011–12	La Liga	28	2	3	0	–		2 (Note: Appearances in UEFA Europa League)	0	–		33	2
Sevilla	2012–13	La Liga	26	3	7	1	–		–		–		33	4
Sevilla	2013–14	La Liga	27	2	1	0	–		13	1	–		41	3
Sevilla	2014–15	La Liga	0	0	0	0	–		1 (Note: Appearance in UEFA Super Cup)	0	–		1	0
Sevilla	Total		148	12	18	2	—		30	1	2	0	198	15
Tottenham Hotspur	2014–15	Premier League	20	0	2	0	3	0	6	0	–		31	0
Tottenham Hotspur	2015–16	Premier League	0	0	0	0	1	0	0	0	–		1	0
Tottenham Hotspur	Total		20	0	2	0	4	0	6	0	–		32	0
Sevilla (loan)	2015–16	La Liga	4	0	0	0	—		2	0	—		6	0
Roma (loan)	2016–17	Serie A	37	2	2	0	—		9 (Note: One appearance in UEFA Champions League, eight appearances in UEFA Europa League)	2	—		48	4
Roma	2017–18	Serie A	34	2	0	0	—		11	0	—		45	2
Roma	2018–19	Serie A	34	5	2	0	—		6	0	—		42	5
Roma	2019–20	Serie A	16	1	0	0	—		7	1	—		23	2
Roma	2020–21	Serie A	6	1	0	0	—		5	0	—		11	1
Roma	Total		127	11	4	0	–		38	3	–		169	14
Salernitana	2021–22	Serie A	16	1	—		—		—		—		16	1
Salernitana	2022–23	Serie A	14	1	1	0	—		—		—		15	1
Salernitana	2023–24	Serie A	17	1	1	0	—		—		—		18	1
Salernitana	Total		47	3	2	0	–		–		–		49	3
Career total			363	26	26	2	4	0	76	4	2	0	471	32

=== International ===
National team	Year	Apps	Goals
Argentina	2011	2	0
Argentina	2014	1	0
Argentina	2017	4	1
Argentina	2018	3	0
Total		10	1

Argentina score listed first, score column indicates score after each Fazio goal.

List of international goals scored by Federico Fazio
No.	Date	Venue	Opponent	Score	Result	Competition
1.	13 June 2017	National Stadium, Kallang, Singapore	Singapore	1–0	6–0	Friendly

== Honours ==
Sevilla B

- Segunda División B: 2006–07

Sevilla

- Copa del Rey: 2009–10
- Supercopa de España: 2007
- UEFA Europa League: 2013–14

Tottenham Hotspur

- Football League Cup runner-up: 2014–15

Argentina U20

- FIFA U-20 World Cup: 2007

Argentina U23

- Summer Olympics: 2008
