= Javier Hervás =

Spanish footballer

Javi Hervás
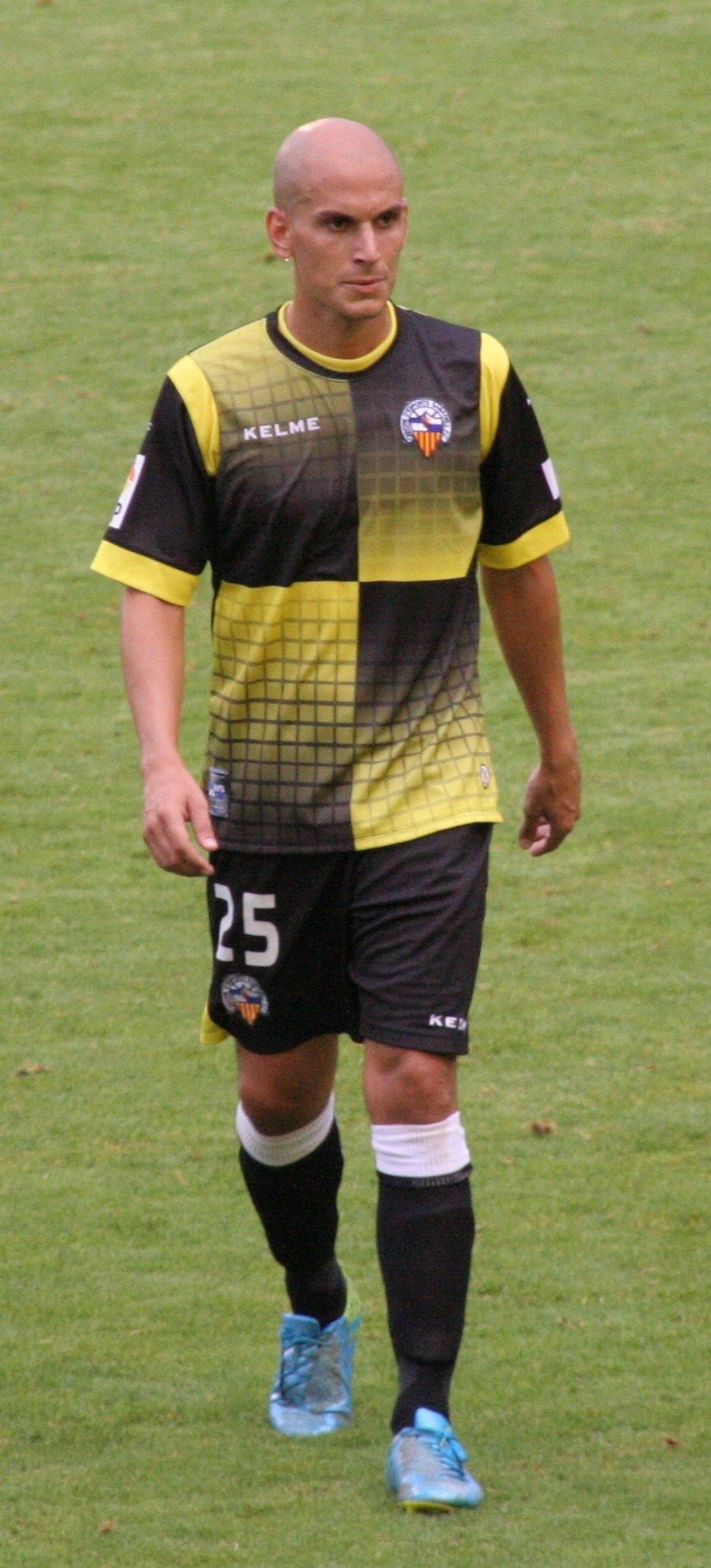
- Hervás playing for Sabadell in 2014

Personal information
- Full name: Javier Hervás Salmoral
- Date of birth: 9 June 1989 (age 37)
- Place of birth: Córdoba, Spain
- Height: 1.76 m (5 ft 9 in)
- Position: Midfielder

Youth career
- 2004–2008: Córdoba

Senior career*
Years	Team	Apps	(Gls)
2008–2011	Córdoba B	61	(5)
2008–2009	→ Montilla (loan)	33	(4)
2011–2012	Córdoba	21	(2)
2012–2015	Sevilla	9	(0)
2012	→ Córdoba (loan)	12	(1)
2013–2014	→ Hércules (loan)	20	(0)
2014–2015	→ Sabadell (loan)	23	(2)
2015–2016	Brisbane Roar	17	(0)
2016	Željezničar	0	(0)
2016–2017	Mirandés	18	(0)
2017	Mérida	11	(0)
2018–2020	Honka	73	(6)
2021	Lahti	17	(1)
2022	Villarrubia	11	(0)
2022–2025	Ciudad Lucena	59	(3)
- * Club domestic league appearances and goals as of 00:29, 16 July 2026 (UTC)

Javier 'Javi' Hervás Salmoral (born 9 June 1989) is a Spanish professional footballer who plays as a midfielder.

== Club career ==
Born in Córdoba, Andalusia, Hervás spent his youth career at local Córdoba CF, making his senior debut with amateurs Montilla CF whilst on loan and also going on to appear for the former's B team. On 4 June 2011, in the last day of the season, he played his first game as a professional, featuring the full 90 minutes of a 2–1 away loss against Girona FC in the Segunda División.

Hervás signed a five-year contract with Sevilla FC on 11 January 2012, but was allowed to stay with Córdoba until the end of the campaign. Returned for 2012–13, he first appeared in La Liga on 18 August 2012, coming on as a late substitute for Piotr Trochowski in the 2–1 home win over Getafe CF.

Deemed surplus to requirements by newly appointed manager Unai Emery, Hervás was successively loaned to second-division clubs Hércules CF and CE Sabadell FC, being relegated with the latter. On 7 October 2015, the free agent moved abroad for the first time in his career, joining compatriot Corona at A-League side Brisbane Roar FC.

At the end of the season, having made only two starting appearances, the Australians decided not to offer Hervás a new contract. On 6 May 2016, he signed with Bosnian club FK Željezničar Sarajevo, but returned to his homeland one month later, agreeing to a two-year deal at second-tier CD Mirandés.

In late January 2018, after a brief spell in the Spanish third division with Mérida AD, Hervás joined Finland's FC Honka. In July, he was named in the Veikkausliiga Team of the Month for the previous month, but left at the end of the year.

On 31 January 2022, Hervás moved to Villarrubia CF of the newly formed Tercera División RFEF.

== Career statistics ==
As of 3 May 2016

Club	Season	League			Cup		Other		Total	
Club	Season	Division	Apps	Goals	Apps	Goals	Apps	Goals	Apps	Goals
Córdoba	2010–11	Segunda División	1	0	0	0	—		1	0
Córdoba	2011–12	Segunda División	32	3	5	0	1 (Note: Appearance in La Liga play-offs)	0	38	3
Córdoba	Total		33	3	5	0	1	0	39	3
Sevilla	2012–13	La Liga	9	0	3	0	—		12	0
Hércules (loan)	2013–14	Segunda División	20	0	1	0	—		21	0
Sabadell (loan)	2014–15	Segunda División	23	2	1	0	—		24	2
Brisbane Roar	2015–16	A-League	17	0	0	0	—		17	0
Željezničar	2016–17	Premier League	0	0	0	0	—		0	0
Career total			102	5	10	0	1	0	113	5
