= Piotr Trochowski =

German footballer (born 1984)

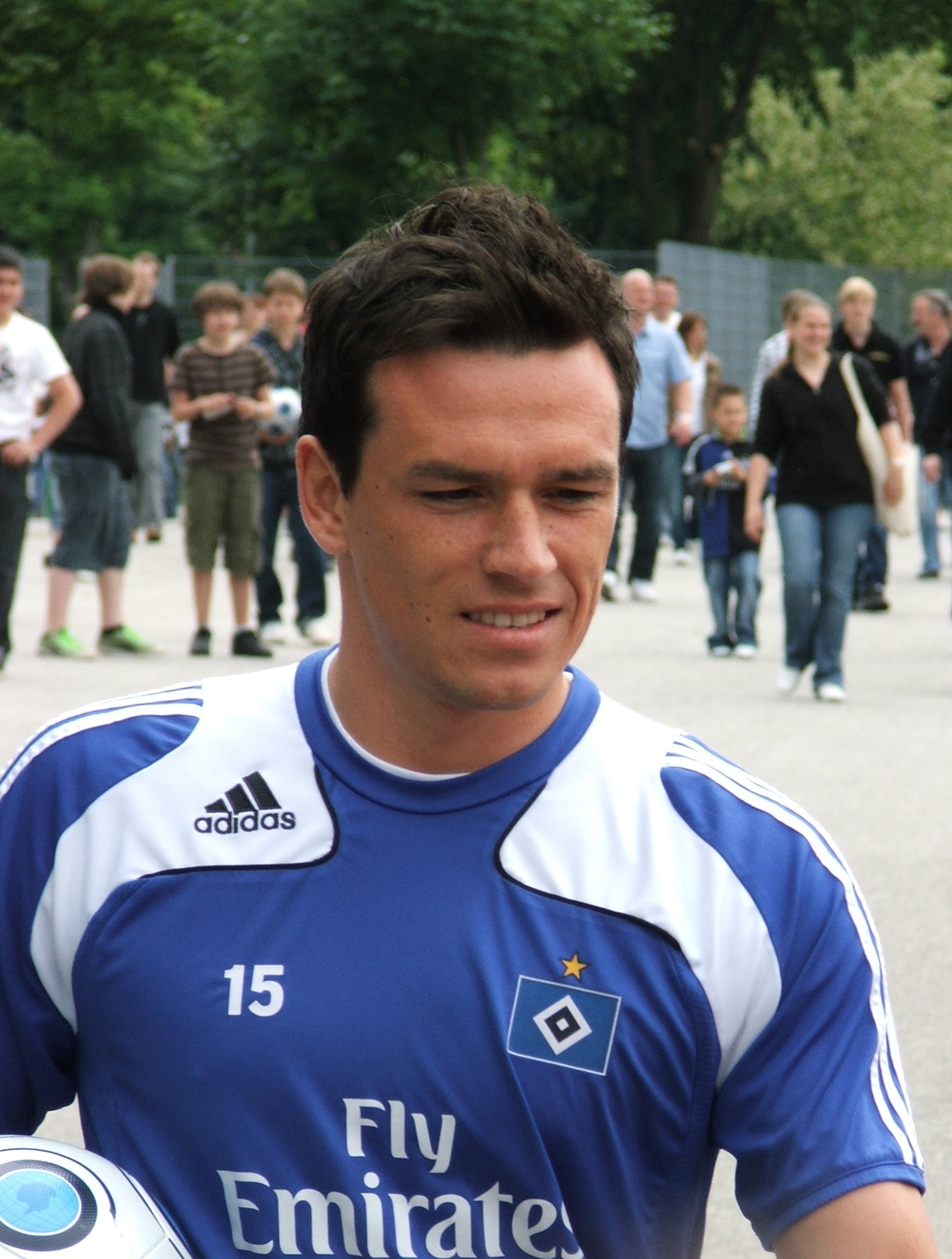
- Trochowski at practice with Hamburg in 2009

Personal information
- Full name: Piotr Artur Trochowski
- Date of birth: 22 March 1984 (age 42)
- Place of birth: Tczew, Poland
- Height: 1.69 m (5 ft 7 in)
- Position: Attacking midfielder

Youth career
- 1993–1995: SpVgg Billstedt Horn
- 1995–1997: Concordia von 1907
- 1997–1999: FC St. Pauli
- 1999–2002: Bayern Munich

Senior career*
Years	Team	Apps	(Gls)
2002–2005	Bayern Munich II	38	(8)
2003–2005	Bayern Munich	13	(1)
2005–2011	Hamburger SV	180	(20)
2011–2015	Sevilla	59	(3)
2015–2016	FC Augsburg	6	(0)
2019–2021	Hamburger SV III	4	(2)
Total		301	(33)

International career
2001	Germany U18	5	(1)
2003	Germany U20	13	(5)
2004–2006	Germany U21	15	(2)
2006–2010	Germany	35	(2)
Medal record
Men's football
Representing Germany
FIFA World Cup
Third place	2010
UEFA European Championship
Runner-up	2008
- * Club domestic league appearances and goals

Piotr Artur Trochowski (Polish pronunciation: [ˈpjɔtr ˈartur trɔˈxɔfskʲi], German: [tʁoˈxɔfski] born 22 March 1984) is a German former professional footballer who played as an attacking midfielder. According to his 2010 FIFA World Cup profile he is a playmaker known for "his speed, agility, tricky dribbling and refined technique."

Formed at Bayern Munich, he spent six-and-a-half seasons at Hamburger SV before transferring to Sevilla in 2011. Sevilla cancelled his contract in September 2014, after which he filed a lawsuit. In 2015, he signed for FC Augsburg on a one-year deal.

Trochowski made his full international debut for Germany in 2006, and earned 35 caps over four years. He was part of their squads which reached the UEFA Euro 2008 Final and the semi-finals of the 2010 FIFA World Cup.

== Early life ==
Trochowski was born in Tczew in Poland. The family, with father Wiesław and mother Alicja, left for Hamburg under the right of return when Piotr was five years old. All of his grandparents held German nationality for some period of time.

== Club career ==
=== Early career ===
As a nine-year-old boy, Trochowski started his career with Billstedt Horn and then played for SC Concordia and FC St. Pauli, in Hamburg. In 1999, he got transferred to FC Bayern Munich, starting with its junior side then progressing to the amateur team. He made it also to Bayern's first team but was never a regular in this side, making only 13 appearances in the Bundesliga.

=== Hamburger SV ===
In January 2005, he moved back to Hamburg to play for Hamburger SV. Team manager Thomas Doll gave him a chance and Trochowski proved his worth. Within two seasons, he played himself into the starting line-up of the team, scoring five goals (including one [and an assist] against former team Bayern Munich, in a 24 September 2005 2–0 home win) in his first full season as Hamburg reached the UEFA Champions League.

=== Sevilla ===
On 5 April 2011, Trochowski's agent Roman Grill confirmed that his client would move to Sevilla when his contract expired at the end of the season. He had been an irregular player for Hamburg during the second half of the season, making just two starts out of 11 possible Bundesliga matches after the winter break. In his first season with the club, he featured in 35 La Liga games, scoring one goal and providing two assists as Sevilla finished in a disappointing ninth place.

On 15 September 2012, he smashed in a half-volley after only 69 seconds, to hand his side a 1–0 victory over reigning La Liga champions Real Madrid.

In September 2014, Sevilla stated that the club and Trochowski terminated the contract by mutual consent, one year prior then contractually agreed. He disagreed, threatening a lawsuit against the club which was decided in his favor. Nevertheless, he was not included in Sevilla‘s squad throughout the season.

=== FC Augsburg ===
On 16 July 2015, Trochowski joined Bundesliga club FC Augsburg for a short trial before signing a full contract with Augsburg until the end of the 2015–16 season five days later. Having made few appearances due to injuries, he was released by Augsburg at the end of the season.

=== Retirement ===
Trochowski later retired. He returned to playing for about a year in 2020, scoring two goals in four appearances in the Oberliga Hamburg for the third team of Hamburger SV. He announced his retirement in July 2021.

== International career ==
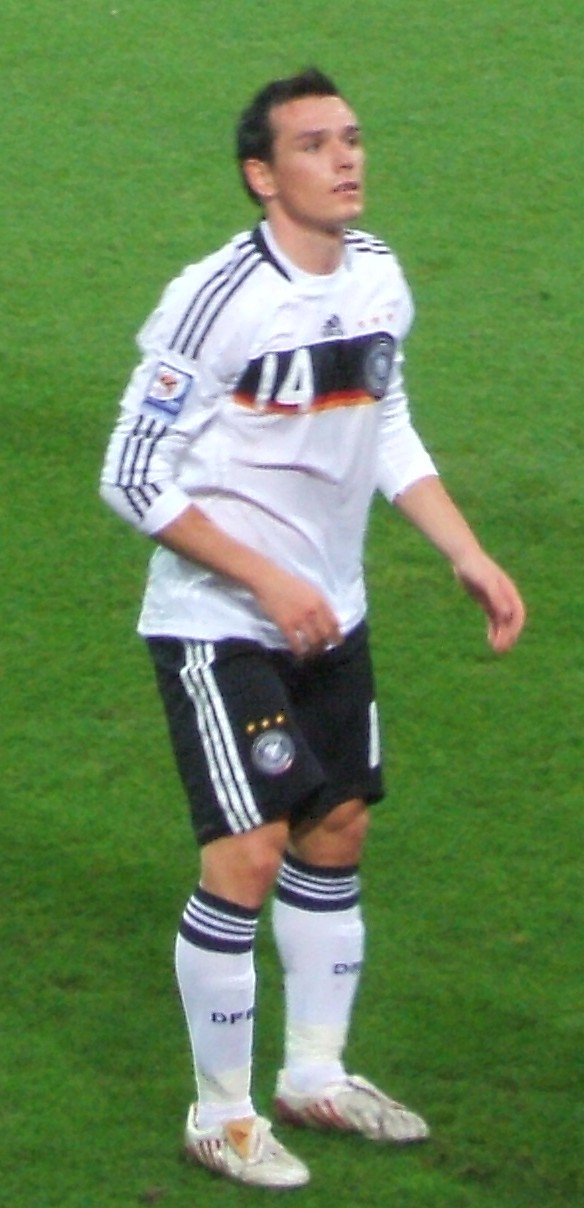
Trochowski with the German national team in 2008

Since Trochowski was born in Poland, he was eligible to play for Poland. His mother sent several letters to the Polish Football Association (PZPN), informing it about her talented son and about his willingness to cap for Poland. The PZPN, however, was not interested, which disappointed both Trochowski and his mother, and he chose to play for Germany. Trochowski said in response, "My heart is closer to Poland, but nobody there was interested in me, so I play for the Germans. There was no reply to my mother's letter, and the Germans were interested in me." He said this in an interview in August 2005. In the German daily Die Welt, however, Trochowski said that, "Even back then, I wanted to play for Germany, because here I enjoyed my schooling and gained my footballing skills."

Trochowski played for the German under-20 team at the 2003 FIFA World Youth Championship. One year after his move to Hamburg, senior national coach Joachim Löw called him for the first time, and he debuted on 7 October 2006 in a friendly against Georgia at the Ostseestadion in Rostock; he started the game and was replaced by Torsten Frings for the final 14 minutes of the 2–0 victory. After having appeared six times during the qualification matches, Trochowski was selected for the final 23-man squad for Euro 2008, but was unused as Germany reached the final. He scored his first international goal on 15 October 2008, the sole goal in a 2010 World Cup Qualifier against Wales in Mönchengladbach. He was part of the German squad for 2010 FIFA World Cup in South Africa where the team became third.

== Personal life ==
Piotr is part of a football family – his three brothers are all semi-professional players: Christoph (plays for SC V/W Billstedt), Sławomir (plays for Hamm United) and Arkadiusz (plays for TuS Hamburg).

His cousin Krystian is a German international rugby union player, playing for the Berliner RC in the Rugby-Bundesliga.

== Career statistics ==
=== Club ===
Appearances and goals by club, season and competition
Club	Season	League			Cup (Note: Includes DFB-Pokal and Copa del Rey.)		Continental (Note: Includes UEFA Champions League, UEFA Cup/Europa League, and UEFA Intertoto Cup.)		Other (Note: Includes DFL-Ligapokal.)		Total		Ref.
Club	Season	League	Apps	Goals	Apps	Goals	Apps	Goals	Apps	Goals	Apps	Goals	Ref.
Bayern Munich II	2001–02	Regionalliga Süd	7	0	—		—		—		7	0	
Bayern Munich II	2002–03	Regionalliga Süd	9	1	1	0	—		—		10	1	
Bayern Munich II	2003–04	Regionalliga Süd	17	5	—		—		—		17	5	
Bayern Munich II	2004–05	Regionalliga Süd	5	1	1	0	—		—		6	1	
Bayern Munich II	Total		38	7	2	0	0	0	0	0	40	2	—
Bayern Munich	2002–03	Bundesliga	3	0	0	0	0	0	0	0	3	0	
Bayern Munich	2003–04	Bundesliga	10	1	1	0	0	0	0	0	11	1	
Bayern Munich	2004–05	Bundesliga	0	0	0	0	0	0	1	0	1	0	
Bayern Munich	Total		13	1	1	0	0	0	1	0	15	1	—
Hamburger SV	2004–05	Bundesliga	3	0	0	0	0	0	—		3	0	
Hamburger SV	2005–06	Bundesliga	32	5	3	0	16	2	—		51	7	
Hamburger SV	2006–07	Bundesliga	26	2	1	0	8	1	2	0	37	3	
Hamburger SV	2007–08	Bundesliga	32	1	4	2	14	3	—		50	6	
Hamburger SV	2008–09	Bundesliga	33	6	4	0	11	3	—		48	9	
Hamburger SV	2009–10	Bundesliga	33	4	2	3	11	1	—		46	8	
Hamburger SV	2010–11	Bundesliga	21	2	1	0	—		—		22	2	
Hamburger SV	Total		180	20	15	5	60	10	2	0	255	35	—
Hamburger SV II	2006–07	Regionalliga Nord	1	0	—		—		—		1	0	
Sevilla	2011–12	La Liga	35	1	3	0	2	0	—		40	1	
Sevilla	2012–13	La Liga	6	2	0	0	0	0	—		6	2	
Sevilla	2013–14	La Liga	18	0	1	0	5	0	—		24	0	
Sevilla	Total		59	3	4	0	7	0	0	0	70	3	—
FC Augsburg	2015–16	Bundesliga	6	0	1	0	5	2	—		12	2	
Hamburger SV III	2019–20	Oberliga Hamburg	2	1	—		—		—		2	1	
Hamburger SV III	2020–21	Oberliga Hamburg	2	1	—		—		—		2	1	
Hamburger SV III	Total		4	2	0	0	0	0	0	0	4	2	
Career total			301	33	23	5	72	12	3	0	399	50	—

=== International ===
Scores and results list Germany's goal tally first, score column indicates score after each Trochowski goal.

List of international goals scored by Piotr Trochowski
No.	Date	Venue	Opponent	Score	Result	Competition	Ref.
1	15 October 2008	Borussia-Park, Mönchengladbach, Germany	Wales	1–0	1–0	2010 World Cup qualifier	
2	2 June 2009	Sheikh Zayed Stadium, Abu Dhabi, United Arab Emirates	United Arab Emirates	3–0	7–2	Friendly	

== Honours ==
Bayern Munich

- Bundesliga: 2002–03
- DFB-Pokal: 2002–03
- DFB-Ligapokal: 2004

Hamburger SV

- UEFA Intertoto Cup: 2005, 2007

Sevilla

- UEFA Europa League: 2013–14

Germany

- FIFA World Cup third place: 2010
- UEFA European Championship runner-up: 2008
