= Tiberio Guarente =

Italian footballer (born 1985)

Personal information
- Full name: Tiberio Guarente
- Date of birth: 1 November 1985 (age 41)
- Place of birth: Pisa, Italy
- Height: 1.80 m (5 ft 11 in)
- Position: Midfielder

Youth career
- 1991–1994: Turris
- 1994–1999: Margine Coperta
- 1999–2004: Atalanta

Senior career*
Years	Team	Apps	(Gls)
2004–2007	Verona	54	(1)
2007–2010	Atalanta	92	(3)
2010–2014	Sevilla	10	(0)
2012–2013	→ Bologna (loan)	20	(2)
2013–2014	→ Catania (loan)	13	(0)
2014	→ Chievo (loan)	10	(0)
2014–2015	Empoli	1	(0)
Total		200	(6)

International career
2003	Italy U18	1	(0)
2003–2004	Italy U19	3	(0)
2004	Italy U20	2	(0)
2008	Italy U21	3	(0)
2008	Italy U23	8	(0)
- * Club domestic league appearances and goals

Tiberio Guarente (born 1 November 1985) is an Italian retired professional footballer who played as a central midfielder.

== Club career ==
=== Early career ===
Born in Pisa, Italy, Guarente began his youth career with Turris in 1991, before moving to Margine Coperta in 1994. After 5 years with the club, he was scouted by Atalanta in 1999. Following his move to Bergamo, Guarente went on to become an integral part of the club's youth academy during the next five years, before being sold to then-Serie B outfit Hellas Verona.

=== Hellas Verona ===
After moving to Verona, Guarente went on to make 17 league appearances and 3 Coppa Italia appearances during the 2004–05 Serie B campaign, his debut season as a professional. The following season, Guarente was hampered with injuries, limiting the midfielder to just 4 Serie B appearances for his club. During the 2006-07 Serie B campaign, Guarente returned to his usual levels, making 37 appearances and scoring 1 league goal in all competitions, though this was not enough to save the gialloblu from relegation to Serie C1 for the 2007-08 statistical season. Following Verona's relegation, Guarente was sold to former club, Atalanta.

=== Atalanta ===
On 1 July 2007, Guarente's transfer back to Atalanta was officially completed. The 2007–08 Serie A campaign was his debut season in the top flight of Italian football. Alongside Fernando Tissone, Guarente formed part of a formidable midfield for the club that season, making 27 league appearances. Following the 2008-09 Serie A season, which included 33 Serie A appearances for the player, Guarente was rewarded with a new and improved contract with the club. He signed a new 5-year contract with an increase in net income in the summer 2009. Atalanta were relegated the following summer, and he was sold to Sevilla of the Spanish La Liga on 17 June 2010.

=== Sevilla, loans and retirement ===
The midfielder signed a five-year deal which included a €30 million buy-out-clause. Guarente began the 2010–11 La Liga campaign as a starter, although his season ended after just four starts, following a knee operation. He continuously suffered relapses of the injury during his two-season spell with Sevilla. He made just 7 appearances the following season as well.

In an attempt to regain fitness, Guarente was sent on loan to Serie A outfit, Bologna for the 2012–13 Serie A season, with an option to purchase outright. Bologna turned down the option to sign Guarente on a permanent basis following his 20 appearances. On 29 August 2013, Guarente was officially sent to Calcio Catania on another season-long loan deal in the Serie A. Catania will also have the option to purchase the player outright following the conclusion of the 2013–14 Serie A campaign. On 31 January 2014, he moved to Chievo Verona.

For the 2014–2015 season, he joined Empoli F.C. on a free transfer. By February 2015, he had made only one appearance struggling with injury problems. On 29 June 2015, he agreed to the resolution of his contract.

== International career ==
Guarente was part of the Italy team which won the 2008 Toulon Tournament.
