= Gonzalo Suárez (footballer) =

Spanish footballer

Personal information
- Full name: Gonzalo Suárez Llano
- Date of birth: 22 April 1994 (age 32)
- Place of birth: Coria del Río, Spain
- Height: 1.84 m (6 ft 0 in)
- Position: Forward

Team information
- Current team: San Roque

Youth career
- Sevilla

Senior career*
Years	Team	Apps	(Gls)
2012–2015	Sevilla B	45	(5)
2013	Sevilla	0	(0)
2015–2016	Mérida	21	(1)
2016–2017	Europa	12	(1)
2017–	San Roque	17	(1)
- * Club domestic league appearances and goals as of 17 December 2017

Gonzalo Suárez Llano (born 22 April 1994), sometimes known simply as Gonzalo, is a Spanish footballer who plays for CD San Roque de Lepe as a forward.

== Football career ==
Suárez was born in Coria del Río, Seville, Andalusia on 29 April 1994, and who played youth football with Sevilla FC. In August 2012, still a junior, he began appearing professionally with the B-team in Segunda División B.

He made his official debut with the main squad on 9 January 2013, playing the last 11 minutes as a substitute for Baba Diawara in a 1–2 home loss against RCD Mallorca for the season's Copa del Rey.
