= 2007 UEFA Super Cup =

- Match programme cover
Milan	Sevilla
(Italy)	(Spain)
3	1
- Date: 31 August 2007
- Venue: Stade Louis II, Monaco
- Man of the Match: Andrea Pirlo (Milan)
- Referee: Konrad Plautz (Austria)
- Attendance: 17,822

The 2007 UEFA Super Cup was the 32nd UEFA Super Cup, an annual football match between the winners of the previous season's UEFA Champions League and UEFA Cup competitions. The match was held at the Stade Louis II in Monaco on 31 August 2007 and contested by Milan, who won the 2006–07 UEFA Champions League, and Sevilla, winners of the 2006–07 UEFA Cup. Sevilla were looking to become only the second team to defend the trophy in its history, the first being Milan, who had previously won the trophy four times. This was Milan's seventh appearance in the Super Cup, putting them one ahead of the previous season's runners-up, Barcelona.

The death of Sevilla midfielder Antonio Puerta three days prior raised a possibility that the match would be cancelled, but the game was still played, and all players wore the name "PUERTA" on their shirt, below their number.

Milan won the match 3–1, with goals from Filippo Inzaghi, Marek Jankulovski and the UEFA Club Footballer of the Year, Kaká. All three of Milan's goals came in the second half after Renato had put Sevilla 1–0 up after only 14 minutes. This was Milan's fifth Super Cup title, a new record.

== Match ==
=== Summary ===
Sevilla had an opportunity to open the scoring early on, when Renato pounced on Massimo Oddo's fluffed clearance, but he sent his shot wide. Two minutes later, Milan had a chance to score after Filippo Inzaghi's shot was deflected onto the post by Kaká. Sevilla went 1–0 up on 14 minutes when Renato headed in from Duda's corner. The Sevilla players celebrated the goal by pointing towards the sky. Sevilla almost scored a second goal on 25 minutes, after Gennaro Gattuso's attempt to intercept a Sevilla counter only resulted in him sliding the ball to Frédéric Kanouté, who rounded Dida but played his pass behind Renato. The Brazilian was able to get the ball under control and get a shot off, but saw his shot blocked by Alessandro Nesta. However, Inzaghi tied the score after the break after scoring a free header from Gennaro Gattuso's cross from the right side. Marek Jankulovski found the winner soon afterwards through a lovely left-footed volley to hit a low diagonal shot to the keeper's left. Kaká capped off the fine overall display when he headed home the rebound after his initial shot from a penalty was saved.

=== Details ===
31 August 2007
20:45 CEST

Milan (Italy)	3–1	(Spain) Sevilla
Inzaghi 55'; Jankulovski 62'; Kaká 87'	Report	Renato 14'

Stade Louis II, Monaco
Attendance: 17,822
Referee: Konrad Plautz (Austria)

Milan	Sevilla

GK	1	(Brazil) Dida
RB	44	(Italy) Massimo Oddo
CB	4	(Georgia (country)) Kakha Kaladze
CB	13	(Italy) Alessandro Nesta
LB	18	(Czech Republic) Marek Jankulovski
RM	23	(Italy) Massimo Ambrosini (c)
CM	21	(Italy) Andrea Pirlo
LM	8	(Italy) Gennaro Gattuso	(yellow card) 7'	(substituted off) 73'
AM	22	(Brazil) Kaká
AM	10	(Netherlands) Clarence Seedorf		(substituted off) 89'
CF	9	(Italy) Filippo Inzaghi		(substituted off) 88'
Substitutes:
GK	16	(Australia) Zeljko Kalac
DF	2	(Brazil) Cafu
DF	19	(Italy) Giuseppe Favalli
DF	25	(Italy) Daniele Bonera
MF	5	(Brazil) Emerson		(substituted on) 73'
MF	32	(Italy) Cristian Brocchi		(substituted on) 89'
FW	11	(Italy) Alberto Gilardino		(substituted on) 88'
Manager:
(Italy) Carlo Ancelotti

GK	1	(Spain) Andrés Palop
RB	4	(Brazil) Dani Alves
CB	14	(France) Julien Escudé		(substituted off) 83'
CB	18	(Spain) José Luis Martí (c)		(substituted off) 65'
LB	3	(Serbia) Ivica Dragutinović
DM	8	(Denmark) Christian Poulsen	(yellow card) 70'
RM	7	(Spain) Jesús Navas
LM	5	(Portugal) Duda	(yellow card) 68'	(substituted off) 74'
AM	11	(Brazil) Renato
CF	21	(Mali) Seydou Keita
CF	12	(Mali) Frédéric Kanouté
Substitutes:
GK	13	(Italy) Morgan De Sanctis
DF	15	(Colombia) Aquivaldo Mosquera
MF	17	(Spain) Diego Capel
MF	25	(Italy) Enzo Maresca		(substituted on) 74'
FW	9	(Russia) Aleksandr Kerzhakov		(substituted on) 65'
FW	10	(Brazil) Luís Fabiano		(substituted on) 83'
FW	20	(Belgium) Tom De Mul
Manager:
(Spain) Juande Ramos

Man of the Match:
Andrea Pirlo (Milan)

Assistant referees:
Egon Bereuter (Austria)
Markus Mayr (Austria)
Fourth official:
Fritz Stuchlik (Austria)

Match rules

- 90 minutes.
- 30 minutes of extra-time if necessary.
- Penalty shoot-out if scores still level.
- Seven named substitutes.
- Maximum of three substitutions.

=== Statistics ===
First half
Statistic	Milan	Sevilla
Goals scored	0	1
Total shots	5	8
Shots on target	2	2
Saves	1	1
Ball possession	58%	42%
Corner kicks	3	3
Fouls committed	10	12
Offsides	3	1
Yellow cards	1	0
Red cards	0	0

Second half
Statistic	Milan	Sevilla
Goals scored	3	0
Total shots	5	5
Shots on target	4	0
Saves	0	0
Ball possession	50%	50%
Corner kicks	1	5
Fouls committed	8	13
Offsides	1	1
Yellow cards	0	2
Red cards	0	0

Overall
Statistic	Milan	Sevilla
Goals scored	3	1
Total shots	10	13
Shots on target	6	2
Saves	1	1
Ball possession	54%	46%
Corner kicks	4	8
Fouls committed	18	25
Offsides	4	2
Yellow cards	1	2
Red cards	0	0

== See also ==
- 2007–08 UEFA Champions League
- 2007–08 UEFA Cup
- 2007–08 AC Milan season
- 2007–08 Sevilla FC season
- AC Milan in international football
- Sevilla FC in European football
