= 2007–08 Sevilla FC season =

98th season in existence of Sevilla FC

Sevilla FC
2007–08 season
- Chairman: José María del Nido
- Manager: Juande Ramos (until 26 October 2007); Manolo Jiménez (from 27 October 2007)
- La Liga: 5th
- Copa del Rey: Round of 16
- Supercopa de España: Winners
- UEFA Champions League: Round of 16
- UEFA Super Cup: Runners-up
- Top goalscorer: League: Luís Fabiano (24); All: Luís Fabiano (33)
Home colours	Away colours

The 2007–08 season was Sevilla Fútbol Club's seventh consecutive season in La Liga. Juande Ramos began the season as the club's manager but left in late October to take over the vacant manager role at Tottenham Hotspur. He was replaced by Manolo Jiménez. Along with the domestic league, Sevilla competed in this season's editions of the Copa del Rey, Supercopa de España, UEFA Champions League, and UEFA Super Cup.

Sevilla won the Supercopa de España for the first time in the club's history with a 6–3 aggregate win over Real Madrid.

== Death of Antonio Puerta ==
On 25 August 2007, Sevilla defender Antonio Puerta collapsed and lost consciousness in the penalty area due to a cardiac arrest during Sevilla's first La Liga fixture of the 2007–08 campaign against Getafe CF at the Sánchez Pizjuán. He was seen crouching and then subsequently collapsing upon moving back to his team's goal after only 35 minutes of the game had passed, as teammates Ivica Dragutinović and Andrés Palop immediately ran to his side as he lost consciousness; moments later, club medical staff and other players followed suit.

After recovering and being substituted, Puerta was able to walk to the dressing room, where he collapsed once again. He was resuscitated by the doctors and taken, by ambulance, to the intensive care unit of Virgen del Rocío hospital, where he received cardiopulmonary resuscitation.

Puerta died on 28 August 2007, at 14:30. Doctor Francisco Murillo reported that he had suffered multiple organ failure and irreversible brain damage as a result of multiple prolonged cardiac arrests due to an incurable, hereditary heart disease known as arrhythmogenic cardiomyopathy.

Puerta's girlfriend was expecting their first child at the time of his death. As a mark of respect, players from both Sevilla and city rivals Real Betis attended his funeral days after his death and, subsequently, FIFA ordered the installation of resuscitation rooms in every stadium that hosted the World Cup qualifiers.

== Players ==
Note: Flags indicate national team as defined under FIFA eligibility rules; some limited exceptions apply. Players may hold more than one non-FIFA nationality.

No.	Pos.	Nation	Player
1	GK	ESP	Andrés Palop
2	DF	ESP	Javi Navarro (captain)
3	DF	SRB	Ivica Dragutinovic
4	DF	BRA	Dani Alves
5	MF	POR	Duda
6	DF	BRA	Adriano
7	MF	ESP	Jesús Navas
8	MF	DEN	Christian Poulsen
10	FW	BRA	Luís Fabiano
11	MF	BRA	Renato
12	FW	MLI	Frédéric Kanouté
13	GK	ITA	Morgan de Sanctis
14	DF	FRA	Julien Escudé
15	DF	COL	Aquivaldo Mosquera
17	MF	ESP	Diego Capel
18	DF	ESP	David Prieto

No.	Pos.	Nation	Player
19	FW	URU	Javier Chevantón
20	MF	BEL	Tom De Mul
21	MF	MLI	Seydou Keita
22	FW	CIV	Arouna Koné
23	DF	NED	Khalid Boulahrouz (on loan from Chelsea)
25	MF	ITA	Enzo Maresca
26	DF	ESP	José Angel Crespo
27	MF	ESP	Alejandro Alfaro
28	DF	ARG	Federico Fazio
29	GK	ESP	Pablo Vargas
31	DF	ESP	Lolo
32	DF	ESP	Casado
33	MF	ESP	Antonio Vera
34	DF	ESP	Manuel Redondo
35	FW	ESP	Juanjo

== Competitions ==
=== La Liga ===
==== League table ====
Pos	Team	Pld	W	D	L	GF	GA	GD	Pts	Qualification or relegation
3	Barcelona	38	19	10	9	76	43	+33	67	Qualification for the Champions League third qualifying round
4	Atlético Madrid	38	19	7	12	66	47	+19	64 (Note: ATM 4–3 SEV; SEV 1–2 ATM)	Qualification for the Champions League third qualifying round
5	Sevilla	38	20	4	14	75	49	+26	64	Qualification for the UEFA Cup first round
6	Racing Santander	38	17	9	12	42	41	+1	60	Qualification for the UEFA Cup first round
7	Mallorca	38	15	14	9	69	54	+15	59	

Source: LFP
Rules for classification: 1st points; 2nd head-to-head points; 3rd head-to-head goal difference; 4th head-to-head goals scored; 5th goal difference; 6th number of goals scored; 7th Fair-play points

=== Supercopa de España ===
11 August 2007 First leg	Sevilla	1–0	Real Madrid	Ramón Sánchez Pizjuán, Seville
22:00 CET	Luís Fabiano 27' (pen.)	Report		Attendance: 45,000; Referee: Alfonso Pérez Burrull

19 August 2007 Second leg	Real Madrid	3–5 (3–6 agg.)	Sevilla	Santiago Bernabéu, Madrid
22:00 CET	Drenthe 23'; Cannavaro 44'; Ramos 78'	Report	Renato 16', 27'; Kanouté 37' (pen.), 80', 89'	Attendance: 69,000; Referee: Alberto Undiano Mallenco

=== UEFA Champions League ===
==== Third qualifying round ====
15 August 2007 First leg	Sevilla (Spain)	2–0	(Greece) AEK Athens	Ramón Sánchez Pizjuán Stadium, Seville
20:45	Luís Fabiano 48'; Kanouté 67'	Report		Attendance: 34,852; Referee: Ľuboš Micheľ (Slovakia)

3 September 2007 (Note: The second leg of Sevilla's game against AEK Athens was postponed until 3 September due to the death of Antonio Puerta.) Second leg	AEK Athens (Greece)	1–4 (1–6 agg.)	(Spain) Sevilla	Olympic Stadium, Athens
20:45	Rivaldo 82' (pen.)	Report	Luís Fabiano 31' (pen.), 45'; Keita 40'; Kerzhakov 53'	Attendance: 37,777; Referee: Paul Allaerts (Belgium)

==== Group stage ====
Pos	Team	Pld	W	D	L	GF	GA	GD	Pts	Qualification
1	(Spain) Sevilla	6	5	0	1	14	7	+7	15	Advance to knockout stage
2	(England) Arsenal	6	4	1	1	14	4	+10	13	Advance to knockout stage
3	(Czech Republic) Slavia Prague	6	1	2	3	5	16	−11	5	Transfer to UEFA Cup
4	(Romania) Steaua București	6	0	1	5	4	10	−6	1	

Source: RSSSF

19 September 2007 1	Arsenal (England)	3–0	(Spain) Sevilla	Emirates Stadium, London
20:45 (19:45 UTC+1)	Fàbregas 28'; Van Persie 59'; Eduardo 90'	Report MatchCentre		Attendance: 59,992; Referee: Peter Fröjdfeldt (Sweden)

2 October 2007 2	Sevilla (Spain)	4–2	(Czech Republic) Slavia Prague	Ramón Sánchez Pizjuán Stadium, Seville
20:45 (20:45 UTC+2)	Kanouté 9'; Luís Fabiano 27'; Escudé 58'; Koné 69'	Report MatchCentre	Pudil 19'; Kalivoda 90'	Attendance: 24,202; Referee: Yuri Baskakov (Russia)

23 October 2007 3	Sevilla (Spain)	2–1	(Romania) Steaua București	Ramón Sánchez Pizjuán Stadium, Seville
20:45 (20:45 UTC+2)	Kanouté 5'; Luís Fabiano 18'	Report MatchCentre	Petre 64'	Attendance: 28,945; Referee: Roberto Rosetti (Italy)

7 November 2007 4	Steaua București (Romania)	0–2	(Spain) Sevilla	Stadionul Steaua, Bucharest
20:45 (21:45 UTC+2)		Report MatchCentre	Renato 25', 65'	Attendance: 7,984; Referee: Herbert Fandel (Germany)

27 November 2007 5	Sevilla (Spain)	3–1	(England) Arsenal	Ramón Sánchez Pizjuán Stadium, Seville
20:45 (20:45 UTC+1)	Keita 24'; Luís Fabiano 34'; Kanouté 89' (pen.)	Report MatchCentre	Eduardo 11'	Attendance: 35,529; Referee: Eric Braamhaar (Netherlands)

12 December 2007 6	Slavia Prague (Czech Republic)	0–3	(Spain) Sevilla	Stadion Evžena Rošického, Prague
20:45 (20:45 UTC+1)		Report MatchCentre	Luís Fabiano 66'; Kanouté 69'; Dani Alves 87'	Attendance: 11,689; Referee: Viktor Kassai (Hungary)

==== Round of 16 ====
20 February 2008 First leg	Fenerbahçe (Turkey)	3–2	(Spain) Sevilla	Şükrü Saracoğlu Stadium, Istanbul
20:45 (21:45 UTC+2)	Kežman 17'; Lugano 57'; Semih 87'	Report	Edu 23' (o.g.); Escudé 66'	Attendance: 46,210; Referee: Florian Meyer (Germany)

4 March 2008 Second leg	Sevilla (Spain)	3–2 (a.e.t.) (5–5 agg.) (2–3 p)	(Turkey) Fenerbahçe	Ramón Sánchez Pizjuán Stadium, Seville
20:45 (20:45 UTC+1)	Dani Alves 6'; Keita 9'; Kanouté 41'	Report	Deivid 21', 80'	Attendance: 38,626; Referee: Massimo Busacca (Switzerland)
	Penalties
	Kanouté (penalty scored); Escudé (penalty missed); Dragutinović (penalty scored); Maresca (penalty missed); Dani Alves (penalty missed)		(penalty scored) Wederson; (penalty missed) Edu; (penalty scored) Aurélio; (penalty scored) Kežman

=== UEFA Super Cup ===
31 August 2007	Milan (Italy)	3–1	(Spain) Sevilla	Stade Louis II, Monaco
20:45 CEST	Inzaghi 55'; Jankulovski 62'; Kaká 87'	Report	Renato 14'	Attendance: 17,822; Referee: Konrad Plautz (Austria)
