= 2012–13 Málaga CF season =

Málaga
2012–13 season
- President: Abdullah Al Thani
- Manager: Manuel Pellegrini
- Stadium: La Rosaleda
- La Liga: 6th
- Copa del Rey: Quarter-finals
- UEFA Champions League: Quarter-finals
- Top goalscorer: League: Isco (9); All: Roque Santa Cruz (13)
- Highest home attendance: 28,000

The 2012–13 season was the 81st season in Málaga CF's history and their 32nd season in La Liga, the top division of Spanish football. It covers a period from 1 July 2012 to 30 June 2013.

During the season, Málaga competed in the UEFA Champions League for the first time in their history.

== Players ==
=== Squad information ===
The numbers are established according to the official website:www.malagacf.es and www.lfp.es

Updated 2 June 2013

N	Pos.	Nat.	Name	Age	EU	Since	App	Goals	Ends	Transfer fee	Notes
1	GK	(Cameroon)	Carlos Kameni	29	EU	2012 (Winter)	12	0	2014	Free	Second nationality: France
2	RB	(Spain)	Jesús Gámez (captain)	28	EU	2005	242	1	2016	Youth system	
3	CB	(Brazil)	Weligton (VC)	33	Non-EU	2007	176	8	2013	Free	
4	CB	(Uruguay)	Diego Lugano	32	EU	2013	11	0	2013	Loan	Second nationality: Italy
5	CB	(Argentina)	Martín Demichelis	32	EU	2011 (Winter)	84	7	2014	€3,000,000	Second nationality: Italy
6	DM	(Spain)	Ignacio Camacho	23	EU	2011 (Winter)	61	3	2014	€1,500,000	
7	RW	(Spain)	Joaquín	31	EU	2011	57	6	2014	€4,200,000	
8	DM	(France)	Jérémy Toulalan	29	EU	2011	44	3	2015	€11,000,000	
9	CF	(Argentina)	Javier Saviola	31	EU	2012	27	8	2013	Free	Second nationality: Spain
10	AM	(Brazil)	Júlio Baptista	31	EU	2011 (Winter)	29	14	2013	€2,500,000	Second nationality: Spain
11	AM	(Uruguay)	Sebastián Fernández	28	EU	2010	79	12	2015	€3,600,000	Second nationality: Spain
12	FW	(Brazil)	Lucas Piazon	19	Non-EU	2013	11	0	2013	Loan	
13	GK	(Argentina)	Willy Caballero	31	EU	2011 (Winter)	79	0	2016	€900,000	Second nationality: Spain
14	AM	(Chile)	Pedro Morales	28	Non-EU	2013	7	3	2013	Loan	
16	DM	(Chile)	Manuel Iturra	29	EU	2012	25	0	2013	Free	Second nationality: Italy
17	LW	(Portugal)	Duda (VC)	33	EU	2008	224	30	2013	Free	
18	LW	(Portugal)	Eliseu	29	EU	2010	161	17	2014	€2,000,000	
19	RM	(Spain)	Francisco Portillo	23	EU	2010	47	2	2015	Youth system	
21	RB	(Spain)	Sergio Sánchez	27	EU	2011	37	0	2015	€2,800,000	
22	AM	(Spain)	Isco	21	EU	2011	69	14	2017	€6,000,000	
23	CB	(United States)	Oguchi Onyewu	31	EU	2012	2	0	2013	Loan	Second nationality: Belgium
24	CF	(Paraguay)	Roque Santa Cruz	31	EU	2012	31	8	2013	Loan (€800,000)	Second nationality: Spain
25	LB	(Portugal)	Vitorino Antunes	26	EU	2013	11	1	2013	Loan	
45	CF	(Cameroon)	Fabrice Olinga	17	Non-EU	2012	2	1	2012	Youth system	

=== Transfers ===
==== In ====
No.	Pos.	Nat.	Name	Age	EU	Moving from	Type	Transfer window	Ends	Transfer fee	Source
	MF	(Spain)	Xavi Torres	25	EU	Levante	Loan return	Summer	2013	N/A	
10	MF	(Spain)	Apoño	28	EU	Zaragoza	Loan return	Summer	2014	N/A	
	ST	(Portugal)	Edinho	29	EU	Académica (Portugal)	Loan return	Summer	2012	N/A	
	DM	(Chile)	Manuel Iturra	28	Non-EU	União de Leiria (Portugal)	Transfer	Summer	2013	Free	Málagacf.com
	CF	(Argentina)	Javier Saviola	30	EU	Benfica (Portugal)	Transfer	Summer	2013	Free	Málagacf.com
	CF	(Paraguay)	Roque Santa Cruz	31	EU	Manchester City (England)	Loan	Summer	2013	€800,000	Málagacf.com
23	CB	(United States)	Oguchi Onyewu	30	EU	Sporting CP (Portugal)	Loan	Summer	2013	Free	Málagacf.com
	FW	(Brazil)	Lucas Piazon	18	Non-EU	Chelsea (England)	Loan	Winter	2013	NA	ChelseaFC.com
4	CB	(Uruguay)	Diego Lugano	32	EU	Paris Saint-Germain (France)	Loan	Winter	2013	N/A	Málagacf.com
	AM	(Chile)	Pedro Morales	27	Non-EU	Dinamo Zagreb (Croatia)	Loan	Winter	2013	N/A	
	LB	(Portugal)	Vitorino Antunes	25	EU	Paços de Ferreira (Portugal)	Loan	Winter	2013	N/A	Málagacf.com

Total expenditure: ▼€800,000

==== Out ====
No.	Pos.	Nat.	Name	Age	EU	Moving to	Type	Transfer window	Transfer fee	Source
	FW	(Netherlands)	Ruud van Nistelrooy	35	EU		Retirement	Summer	Free	
	DF	(Portugal)	Hélder Rosário	32	EU		End of contract	Summer	Free	
	MF	(Spain)	Javi López	24	EU		End of contract	Summer	Free	
	FW	(Portugal)	Edinho	29	EU	Académica (Portugal)	Loan	Summer	N/A	Todomercado.es
	MF	(Brazil)	Sandro Silva	28	Non-EU	Cruzeiro (Brazil)	Loan	Summer	N/A	Málagacf.com
	DF	(Spain)	Iván González	24	EU		Contract cancellation	Summer	Free	Málagacf.com
1	GK	(Spain)	Rubén Martínez	28	EU	Rayo Vallecano	Loan		N/A	
	DM	(Spain)	Xavi Torres	25	EU	Getafe	Transfer	Summer	€400,000	Getafecf.com
	CM	(Spain)	Apoño	28	EU	Zaragoza	Transfer	Summer	€1,000,000	Málagacf.com
23	FW	(Venezuela)	Salomón Rondón	22	EU	Rubin Kazan (Russia)	Transfer	Summer	€10,000,000	Rubin-kazan.ru (in Russian)
12	MF	(Spain)	Santi Cazorla	27	EU	Arsenal (England)	Transfer	Summer	€19,000,000	Arsenal.com
14	CB	(Netherlands)	Joris Mathijsen	32	EU	Feyenoord (Netherlands)	Transfer	Summer	Free	Málagacf.com
24	CB	(Argentina)	Javier Malagueño	29	EU		Contract cancellation			Málagacf.com
16	DM	(Italy)	Enzo Maresca	32	EU	Sampdoria (Italy)	Transfer	Summer	€2,000,000	LigaBBVA.com
	CM	(Spain)	Recio	21	EU	Granada	Loan	Winter	N/A	Málagacf.com
26	CF	(Spain)	Juanmi	19	EU	Racing Santander	Loan	Winter	N/A	
20	AM	(Argentina)	Diego Buonanotte	24	EU	Granada	Transfer	Winter	€2,300,000	Málagacf.com
15	LB	(Spain)	Nacho Monreal	26	EU	Arsenal (England)	Transfer	Winter	€10,000,000	Málagacf.com

Total income: ▲€45,700,000

== Club ==
=== Coaching staff ===
Position	Staff
Head coach	(Chile) Manuel Pellegrini
2nd coach	(Argentina) Rubén Cousillas
Technical assistant	(Spain) Enrique Ruiz
General manager	(Qatar) Moyad Shatat
Sporting director	(Argentina) Armando Husillos
Sporting adviser	(Spain) Antonio Tapia
Physical trainer	(Spain) José Cabello
Goalkeepers coach	(Spain) Xabi Mancisidor
Physical readaptor	(Spain) Fernando Lacomba
Head of medical services	(Spain) Juan Carlos Pérez Frías
Masseuse	(Spain) Marcelino Torrontegui
Physiotherapists	(Spain) Luis Barbado (Spain) Hugo Camarero
Team delegate	(Spain) Vicente Valcarce
Field delegates	(Spain) Giráldez Carrasco (Spain) Miguel Zambrana (Spain) Juan Carlos Salcedo

Source: Malagacf.com

== Competitions ==
=== La Liga ===
==== League table ====
Pos	Team	Pld	W	D	L	GF	GA	GD	Pts	Qualification or relegation
4	Real Sociedad	38	18	12	8	70	49	+21	66	Qualification for the Champions League play-off round
5	Valencia	38	19	8	11	67	54	+13	65	Qualification for the Europa League group stage (Note: Since the 2012–13 Copa del Rey champions Atlético Madrid and runners-up Real Madrid qualified for the 2013–14 UEFA Champions League, the 5th, 6th and 7th placed teams qualified for the group stage, play-off round, and third qualifying round of the 2013–14 UEFA Europa League respectively.)
6	Málaga	38	16	9	13	53	50	+3	57	(Note: Málaga was excluded from participating in any UEFA club competition in 2013–14 season as a punishment for not complying with UEFA Financial Fair Play Regulations. Málaga appealed against this UEFA ban, but the Court of Arbitration for Sport confirmed the decision of the UEFA Club Financial Control Body.)
7	Real Betis	38	16	8	14	57	56	+1	56	Qualification for the Europa League play-off round
8	Rayo Vallecano	38	16	5	17	50	66	−16	53	(Note: Rayo Vallecano was excluded from participating in any UEFA club competition for the next season after RFEF denied them a "UEFA licence" because they didn't meet the requirements as they were immersed in a creditor contest. They appealed to CAS in June 2013 and on 11 July that decision was confirmed. The team placed behind them, Sevilla, took their spot at the Europa League third qualifying round.)

Source: La Liga
Rules for classification: 1st points; 2nd head-to-head points; 3rd head-to-head goal difference; 4th goal difference; 5th number of goals scored; 7th Fair-play points

==== Results summary ====
Overall								Home						Away					
Pld	W	D	L	GF	GA	GD	Pts	W	D	L	GF	GA	GD	W	D	L	GF	GA	GD
38	16	9	13	53	50	+3	57	10	5	4	33	18	+15	6	4	9	20	32	−12

Last updated: 26 May 2013.
Source: Competitive matches

==== Results by round ====
Round	1	2	3	4	5	6	7	8	9	10	11	12	13	14	15	16	17	18	19	20	21	22	23	24	25	26	27	28	29	30	31	32	33	34	35	36	37	38
Ground	A	H	A	H	A	H	A	H	A	H	H	A	H	A	H	A	H	A	H	H	A	H	A	H	A	A	H	A	A	A	H	A	H	A	H	A	H	A
Result	W	D	W	W	D	W	L	W	D	L	L	D	W	L	W	W	W	L	L	D	W	D	W	W	L	D	D	L	W	L	W	L	W	L	L	D	W	L
Position	6	8	4	3	4	3	3	3	3	5	5	5	4	5	4	4	4	4	5	5	4	5	4	4	5	5	5	5	5	5	5	6	5	6	6	6	6	6

Updated to match(es) played on 2 June 2013. Source: La Liga
A = Away; H = Home; W = Win; D = Draw; L = Loss

==== Matches ====
18 August 2012 1	Celta Vigo	0–1	Málaga	Vigo
22:00 CEST	Oubiña (yellow card) 80'; Mallo (yellow card) 82'	Summary	Olinga 84'	Stadium: Balaídos; Attendance: 16,360; Referee: Carlos del Cerro Grande (Community of Madrid)

27 August 2012 2	Málaga	1–1	Mallorca	Málaga
00:00 CEST	Demichelis (yellow card) 74'; Juanmi 76'; Duda (yellow card) 86'; Eliseu (red card) 89'	Summary	Márquez (yellow card) 43'; Víctor (yellow card) 58'; Hemed 67'; Pina (yellow card) 83'; Aouate (yellow card) 85'	Stadium: La Rosaleda; Attendance: 22,542; Referee: Jesús Gil Manzano (Extremadura)

1 September 2012 3	Zaragoza	0–1	Málaga	Zaragoza
18:00 CEST	José Mari (yellow card) 58'	Summary	Weligton (yellow card) 30'; Camacho 56', (yellow card) 74'; Duda (yellow card) 84'; Saviola (yellow card) 90'	Stadium: La Romareda; Attendance: 20,000; Referee: Alberto Undiano Mallenco (Navarre)

16 September 2012 4	Málaga	3–1	Levante	Málaga
00:00 CEST	Saviola 27'; Sánchez (yellow card) 36' (yellow-red card) 87'; Camacho (yellow card) 54'; Joaquín 59'; Caballero (yellow card) 80'; F. Portillo 90+3'		Lell (yellow card) 8'; Ballesteros (yellow card) 25'; Míchel 46', (yellow card) 86'; Diop (yellow card) 69'	Stadium: La Rosaleda; Attendance: 21,000; Referee: Carlos Velasco Carballo (Community of Madrid)

23 September 2012 5	Athletic Bilbao	0–0	Málaga	Bilbao
19:50 CEST	Gurpegui (yellow card) 2'; Aduriz (yellow card) 42'; De Marcos (yellow card) 89'	Report	Demichelis (yellow card) 20'; Weligton (yellow card) 42'; Gámez (yellow card) 59'	Stadium: San Mamés; Attendance: 35,000; Referee: Antonio Mateu Lahoz (Valencian Community)

30 September 2012 6	Málaga	4–0	Real Betis	Málaga
00:00 CEST	Joaquín 13' (pen.); Saviola 28'; Gámez (yellow card) 56'; Amaya 72' (o.g.); Isco 74'; Recio (yellow card) 85'	Report	Casto (red card) 10'	Stadium: La Rosaleda; Attendance: 25,753; Referee: Xavier Estrada Fernández (Catalonia)

7 October 2012 7	Atlético Madrid	2–1	Málaga	Madrid
00:00 CEST	Falcao 6', (yellow card) 77'; Filipe Luís (yellow card) 16'; Turan (yellow card) 38'; Suárez (yellow card) 75'; Weligton 90' (o.g.)		Santa Cruz 36'; Camacho (yellow card) 51'; Iturra (yellow card) 58'; Monreal (yellow card) 88'	Stadium: Vicente Calderón; Attendance: 42,000; Referee: Miguel Pérez Lasa (Basque Country)

21 October 2012 8	Málaga	2–1	Real Valladolid	Málaga
00:00 CEST	Demichelis (yellow card) 20'; Isco 37'; Joaquín 87'	Report	Ramos (yellow card) 34'; Valiente (yellow card) 70'; Sereno (yellow card) 84'; Ebert (yellow card) 89'; Manucho 9', (yellow card) 52' (yellow-red card) 81'	Stadium: La Rosaleda; Attendance: 25,000; Referee: Ignacio Iglesias Villanueva (Galicia)

29 October 2012 9	Espanyol	0–0	Málaga	Cornellà de Llobregat
00:00 CEST	Wakaso (yellow card) 23'; Sánchez (yellow card) 34'; Stuani (yellow card) 48'; Forlín (yellow card) 81'	Report	Fernández (yellow card) 26'; Iturra (yellow card) 32'; Duda (yellow card) 51'; Demichelis (yellow card) 67'; Camacho (yellow card) 83'	Stadium: Cornellà-El Prat; Attendance: 21,267; Referee: Carlos Delgado Ferreiro (Basque Country)

4 November 2012 10	Málaga	1–2	Rayo Vallecano	Málaga
00:00 CEST	Demichelis (yellow card) 17', (goal) 49'; Camacho (yellow card) 75'; Duda (yellow card) 90'	Report	Piti 11', 61', (yellow card) 49'; Cobeño (yellow card) 66'; Labaka (yellow card) 80'; Baptistão (yellow card) 82'; Trashorras (yellow card) 90+3'	Stadium: La Rosaleda; Attendance: 28,000; Referee: José Antonio Teixeira Vitienes (Cantabria)

11 November 2012 11	Málaga	1–2	Real Sociedad	Málaga
00:00 CEST	Gámez (yellow card) 33'; Saviola 37'; Toulalan (yellow card) 48'; Weligton (yellow card) 67'; Iturra (yellow card) 71'	Report	Vela 1', (yellow card) 40'; I. Martínez (yellow card) 25'; Prieto 59'	Stadium: La Rosaleda; Attendance: 15,000; Referee: Alberto Undiano Mallenco (Navarre)

17 November 2012 12	Osasuna	0–0	Málaga	Pamplona
15:00 CEST	Damià (yellow card) 30'; Sisi (yellow card) 85'; Loé (yellow card) 87'; Arribas (yellow card) 88'	Report	Toulalan (yellow card) 90+2'	Stadium: El Sadar; Attendance: 15,956; Referee: Xavier Estrada Fernández (Catalonia)

25 November 2012 13	Málaga	4–0	Valencia	Málaga
00:00 CEST	F. Portillo 8'; Joaquín (yellow card) 59'; Weligton (yellow card) 64'; Saviola 75'; Santa Cruz 81'; Isco 90+2'	Report	Guardado (yellow card) 11'; Banega (yellow card) 29'; Gago (yellow card) 40'; T. Costa (yellow card) 72'; Rami (yellow card) 74' (yellow-red card) 84'	Stadium: La Rosaleda; Attendance: 24,500; Referee: César Muñiz Fernández

2 December 2012 14	Getafe	1–0	Málaga	Getafe
00:00 CEST	Lopo 57'; Castro (yellow card) 80' (yellow-red card) 90+3'; Lafita (yellow card) 85'	Report	Camacho (yellow card) 32'; Eliseu (yellow card) 54'; Demichelis (yellow card) 58'; Toulalan (yellow card) 76'	Stadium: Coliseum Alfonso Pérez; Attendance: 12,000; Referee: José González González

9 December 2012 15	Málaga	4–0	Granada	Málaga
00:00 CEST	Isco (yellow card) 14'; Joaquín 27'; Saviola 33'; Gámez (yellow card) 36'; Monreal (yellow card) 39'; Camacho 75'; Santa Cruz 85'	Report		Stadium: La Rosaleda; Attendance: 24,500; Referee: Carlos Clos Gómez

16 December 2012 16	Sevilla	0–2	Málaga	Seville
00:00 CEST	Spahić (yellow card) 58'; Fazio (red card) 69'	Report	Iturra (yellow card) 35'; Weligton (yellow card) 36'; Demichelis 49'; Camacho (yellow card) 62'; Eliseu 70' (pen.); Sánchez (yellow card) 77'	Stadium: Ramón Sánchez Pizjuán; Attendance: 34,000; Referee: Miguel Ayza Gámez

22 December 2012 17	Málaga	3–2	Real Madrid	Málaga
00:00 CEST	Isco 49'; Santa Cruz 73', 76'; Joaquín (yellow card) 83'	Report	Ramos (yellow card) 29'; Sánchez 66' (o.g.); Ronaldo (yellow card) 70'; Pepe (yellow card) 80'; Benzema 82'; Khedira (yellow card) 90+2'	Stadium: La Rosaleda; Attendance: 28,004; Referee: Alejandro Hernández Hernández

6 January 2013 18	Deportivo La Coruña	1–0	Málaga	A Coruña
00:00 CEST	Aguilar (yellow card) 19'; Santos (yellow card) 45+2'; Pizzi 57'; Gama (yellow card) 60'; Camuñas (yellow card) 88'	Report	Gámez (yellow card) 31'; Weligton (yellow card) 36'; Monreal (yellow card) 48'	Stadium: Riazor; Attendance: 25,000; Referee: Fernando Teixeira Vitienes

13 January 2013 19	Málaga	1–3	Barcelona	Málaga
00:00 CEST	Camacho (yellow card) 54'; Buonanotte 89'	Report	Messi 27'; Fàbregas 50', (yellow card) 64'; Busquets (yellow card) 69'; Thiago 82'	Stadium: La Rosaleda; Attendance: 29,323; Referee: Carlos Delgado Ferreiro (Basque Country)

20 January 2013 20	Málaga	1–1	Celta Vigo	Málaga
00:00 CEST	Demichelis 37', (yellow card) 80'; Buonanotte (yellow card) 61'	Report	Varas (yellow card) 38'; Aspas (yellow card) 42'; Fernández 76'; Lago (yellow card) 80'	Stadium: La Rosaleda; Attendance: 20,304; Referee: Xavier Estrada Fernández

27 January 2013 21	Mallorca	2–3	Málaga	Palma
00:00 CEST	Pina (yellow card) 25'; Víctor 27', (yellow card) 37'; Kevin (yellow card) 36'; Dos Santos 71'	Report	Saviola 10'; Isco 16'; Demichelis (yellow card) 28' (yellow-red card) 71'; Monreal 62'; Caballero (yellow card) 66'; Lugano (yellow card) 69'	Stadium: Iberostar; Attendance: 10,547; Referee: Carlos Velasco Carballo

3 February 2013 22	Málaga	1–1	Zaragoza	Málaga
00:00 CEST	Isco 23' (pen.); F. Portillo (yellow card) 55'; Weligton (yellow card) 68'; Toulalan (yellow card) 80'; Baptista (yellow card) 82'	Report	Postiga 13'; Paredes (yellow card) 21'; Abraham (yellow card) 40'; José Mari (yellow card) 64' (yellow-red card) 90+2'; Rodri (yellow card) 81'	Stadium: La Rosaleda; Attendance: 28,000; Referee: Alfonso Álvarez Izquierdo

9 February 2013 23	Levante	1–2	Málaga	Valencia
00:00 CEST	Barkero 27' (pen.), (yellow card) 62'; Vyntra (yellow card) 51'; Juanfran (yellow card) 52'; Navarro (yellow card) 90'	Report	Isco 37' (pen.), 47'; Baptista (yellow card) 64'	Stadium: Ciutat de València; Attendance: 20,100; Referee: Carlos Clos Gómez

17 February 2013 24	Málaga	1–0	Athletic Bilbao	Málaga
00:00 CEST	Saviola 18'; Camacho (yellow card) 87'; Lugano (yellow card) 89'	Report	Iraola (yellow card) 42'; Laporte (yellow card) 61'	Stadium: La Rosaleda; Attendance: 27,000; Referee: José González González

24 February 2013 25	Real Betis	3–0	Málaga	Seville
00:00 CEST	Molina 1'; Mario 19'; Nacho (yellow card) 21'; Pabón 45'; Juan Carlos (yellow card) 60'	Report	Camacho (yellow card) 34' (yellow-red card) 63'; F. Portillo (yellow card) 49'	Stadium: Benito Villamarín; Attendance: 32,611; Referee: Xavier Estrada Fernández; Man of the Match: Beñat

3 March 2013 26	Málaga	0–0	Atlético Madrid	Málaga
00:00 CEST	Weligton (yellow card) 34'; Toulalan (yellow card) 86'	Report	Juanfran (yellow card) 17'; Suárez (yellow card) 38'; Costa (yellow card) 58'; Koke (yellow card) 81'	Stadium: La Rosaleda; Attendance: 26,817; Referee: Jesús Gil Manzano

9 March 2013 27	Real Valladolid	1–1	Málaga	Valladolid
18:00 CEST	Manucho 41'; Balenziaga (yellow card) 78'	Summary	Demichelis 8'; Iturra (yellow card) 23'	Stadium: José Zorrilla; Attendance: 15,420; Referee: Fernando Teixeira Vitienes

17 March 2013 28	Málaga	0–2	Espanyol	Málaga
12:00 CEST	Duda (yellow card) 75'; Camacho (yellow card) 86'	Summary	Wakaso (yellow card) 43'; Colotto 49'; Forlín (yellow card) 55'; Verdú (yellow card) 60'; García 66'	Stadium: La Rosaleda; Attendance: 27,000; Referee: Carlos del Cerro Grande

30 March 2013 29	Rayo Vallecano	1–3	Málaga	Madrid
16:00 CEST	Piti 31' (pen.); Domínguez (yellow card) 33'; Gálvez (yellow card) 46'	Summary	Weligton 21'; Caballero (yellow card) 29'; Baptista 55'; Morales 86'	Stadium: Campo de Vallecas; Attendance: 9,422; Referee: Ignacio Iglesias Villanueva

6 April 2013 30	Real Sociedad	4–2	Málaga	San Sebastián
16:00 CEST	Vela 21'; De la Bella 24', (yellow card) 56'; Griezmann 30'; I. Martínez 51'; Pardo (yellow card) 60'	Report	Morales 43'; Camacho (yellow card) 47'; Santa Cruz 70'; Fernández (yellow card) 72'	Stadium: Anoeta; Attendance: 25,787; Referee: Alberto Undiano Mallenco

13 April 2013 31	Málaga	1–0	Osasuna	Málaga
22:00 CEST	Iturra (yellow card) 78'; Baptista 90+2'	Report	Sola (yellow card) 43'; Bertrán (yellow card) 69'; Puñal (yellow card) 90+2'; Shojaei (yellow card) 90+4'	Stadium: La Rosaleda; Attendance: 29,000; Referee: Carlos Velasco Carballo

21 April 2013 32	Valencia	5–1	Málaga	Valencia
00:00 CEST	Parejo 25'; Soldado 28', 30' (pen.); Canales 31'; Banega (yellow card) 37', (goal) 56'; Pereira (yellow card) 45'; Albelda (yellow card) 51'	Report	Demichelis (yellow card) 29'; Baptista 45+1'; Isco (yellow card) 46'; Camacho (yellow card) 51'; Weligton (yellow card) 70'; Duda (yellow card) 71'; Gámez (yellow card) 86'	Stadium: Mestalla; Attendance: 40,000; Referee: José Antonio Teixeira Vitienes

28 April 2013 33	Málaga	2–1	Getafe	Málaga
00:00 CEST	Iturra (yellow card) 11'; Santa Cruz 40', (yellow card) 70'; Weligton 47'; Camacho (yellow card) 88'	Report	Castro (yellow card) 31'; Valera 70'; Lopo (yellow card) 74'; Sarabia (yellow card) 90+4'	Stadium: La Rosaleda; Attendance: 27,000; Referee: Carlos Clos Gómez

5 May 2013 34	Granada	1–0	Málaga	Granada
00:00 CEST	Ighalo 28'; Brahimi (yellow card) 41'; El-Arabi (yellow card) 65'; Aranda (yellow card) 86'; Nyom (yellow card) 89'	Report	Isco (yellow card) 77'; Weligton (yellow card) 87'	Stadium: Los Cármenes; Attendance: 19,000; Referee: César Muñiz Fernández

19 May 2013 35	Real Madrid	6–2	Málaga	Madrid
00:00 CEST	Albiol 3'; Ronaldo 26', (yellow card) 80'; Özil 33'; Benzema 45+1'; Modrić 63'; Di María 90+1'	Report	Santa Cruz 15', (yellow card) 25'; Sánchez (red card) 21'; Antunes 36'; Demichelis (yellow card) 45+1' (yellow-red card) 73'; Iturra (yellow card) 80'	Stadium: Santiago Bernabéu; Attendance: 60,000; Referee: Jesús Gil Manzano

12 May 2013 36	Málaga	0–0	Sevilla	Málaga
00:00 CEST	Isco (yellow card) 36'; Gámez (yellow card) 41'; Baptista (yellow card) 80'; Lugano (yellow card) 86'	Report	Moreno (yellow card) 50'; Manu (yellow card) 77'; Medel (yellow card) 79'	Stadium: La Rosaleda; Attendance: 26,046; Referee: Miguel Pérez Lasa

29 May 2013 37	Málaga	3–1	Deportivo La Coruña	Málaga
00:00 CEST	Saviola 45'; Iturra (yellow card) 56'; Baptista 64'; Isco 79'; Gámez (yellow card) 90'	Report	Domínguez (yellow card) 67'; Salomão 75'	Stadium: La Rosaleda; Attendance: 26,000; Referee: es:Carlos Delgado Ferreiro

1 June 2013 38	Barcelona	4–1	Málaga	Barcelona
20:00 CEST	Villa 3'; Fàbregas 14'; Montoya 16'; Iniesta 52'	Report	Morales 56'	Stadium: Camp Nou; Attendance: 65,727; Referee: Miguel Ayza Gámez

=== Copa del Rey ===
==== Round of 32 ====
31 October 2012 First leg	Cacereño	3–4	Málaga	Cáceres
20:00 CEST	Carrizosa (yellow card) 22'; Jaraiz 36'; Chapi 42'; Checa (yellow card) 52'; Vargas (red card) 58'; Esteve 86'	Report	Onyewu 4', (yellow card) 64'; Santa Cruz 20', 71'; Duda 59' (pen.); Á. Portillo (yellow card) 84'; Kameni (yellow card) 87'; Weligton (yellow card) 88'	Stadium: Estadio Príncipe Felipe; Attendance: 7,000; Referee: Antonio Mateu Lahoz (Valencian Community)

28 November 2012 Second leg	Málaga	0–1 (4a−4 agg.)	Cacereño	Málaga
00:00 CEST		Report	Chapi 37'; Palero (yellow card) 70'; Checa (yellow card) 80'; Sánchez (yellow card) 85'; Pérez (yellow card) 89'	Stadium: La Rosaleda; Attendance: 13,392; Referee: Carlos del Cerro Grande

==== Round of 16 ====
18 December 2012 First leg	Eibar	1–1	Málaga	Eibar
00:00 CEST	Navas (yellow card) 26'; Añibarro 74'; Mainz (yellow card) 79'; Jiménez (yellow card) 90'	Report	Onyewu (yellow card) 14', (goal) 90+4'; Fernández (yellow card) 34'; Duda (yellow card) 38'; Weligton (yellow card) 74'	Stadium: Ipurua; Attendance: 4,273; Referee: José Antonio Teixeira Vitienes

8 January 2013 Second leg	Málaga	4–1 (5–2 agg.)	Eibar	Málaga
00:00 CEST	Iturra (yellow card) 28'; Buonanotte (yellow card) 48', (goal) 74', 90+1'; Duda (yellow card) 72'; Fernández 77'; F. Portillo 81'; Sánchez (yellow card) 84'	Report	Arroyo 11'; Arruabarrena (yellow card) 62'; García (yellow card) 64'; Roldán (red card) 86'	Stadium: La Rosaleda; Attendance: 25,000; Referee: Jesús Gil Manzano

==== Quarter-finals ====
16 January 2013 First leg	Barcelona	2–2	Málaga	Barcelona
00:00 CEST	A. Sánchez (yellow card) 11'; Messi 29', (yellow card) 34'; Puyol 30'	Report	Iturra 26'; Eliseu (yellow card) 38'; Monreal (red card) 75'; S. Sánchez (yellow card) 82'; Camacho 89'; Fernández (yellow card) 90+3'	Stadium: Camp Nou; Attendance: 55,151; Referee: José González González

24 January 2013 Second leg	Málaga	2–4 (4–6 agg.)	Barcelona	Málaga
00:00 CEST	Joaquín 12'; Iturra (yellow card) 15'; Eliseu (yellow card) 26'; Weligton (yellow card) 40'; Santa Cruz 68'	Report	Pedro 8'; Busquets (yellow card) 32'; Alba (yellow card) 39'; Fàbregas (yellow card) 45+1'; Piqué 49'; Mascherano (yellow card) 68'; Iniesta 76'; Messi 80'; Dani Alves (yellow card) 82'	Stadium: La Rosaleda; Attendance: 27,099; Referee: Antonio Mateu Lahoz

=== UEFA Champions League ===
==== Play-off round ====
22 August 2012 First leg	Málaga (Spain)	2–0	(Greece) Panathinaikos	Málaga, Spain
20:45 CEST	Gámez (yellow card) 9'; Demichelis 18'; Eliseu 34'; Isco (yellow card) 47'; Duda (yellow card) 90+4'	Report	Zeca (yellow card) 18'; Vyntra (yellow card) 72'	Stadium: La Rosaleda; Attendance: 24,605; Referee: Tony Chapron (France)

28 August 2012 Second leg	Panathinaikos (Greece)	0–0 (0–2 agg.)	(Spain) Málaga	Athens, Greece
20:45 CEST	Katsouranis (yellow card) 10'; Vitolo (yellow card) 63'; Marinos (yellow card) 80'	Report	Weligton (yellow card) 31'; Caballero (yellow card) 66'	Stadium: Olympic Stadium; Attendance: 27,719; Referee: Tom Harald Hagen (Norway)

==== Group stage ====
Pos	Team	Pld	W	D	L	GF	GA	GD	Pts	Qualification	MLG	MIL	ZEN	AND
1	(Spain) Málaga	6	3	3	0	12	5	+7	12	Advance to knockout phase	—	1–0	3–0	2–2
2	(Italy) Milan	6	2	2	2	7	6	+1	8	Advance to knockout phase	1–1	—	0–1	0–0
3	(Russia) Zenit Saint Petersburg	6	2	1	3	6	9	−3	7	Transfer to Europa League	2–2	2–3	—	1–0
4	(Belgium) Anderlecht	6	1	2	3	4	9	−5	5		0–3	1–3	1–0	—

Source: Soccerway

18 September 2012 1	Málaga (Spain)	3–0	(Russia) Zenit Saint Petersburg	Málaga, Spain
20:45 CEST	Isco 3', 76'; Saviola 13', (yellow card) 31'; Demichelis (yellow card) 15'	Report	Hulk (yellow card) 90'	Stadium: La Rosaleda; Attendance: 23,670; Referee: Mark Clattenburg (England)

3 October 2012 2	Anderlecht (Belgium)	0–3	(Spain) Málaga	Anderlecht, Belgium
20:45 CEST	Gillet (yellow card) 16'; Kouyaté (yellow card) 56'; Mbokani (yellow card) 58'; Wasilewski (yellow card) 59'	Report	Eliseu 45+1', 64'; Joaquín 57' (pen.); Demichelis (yellow card) 58'; Sánchez (yellow card) 71'; Iturra (yellow card) 87'	Stadium: Constant Vanden Stock Stadium; Attendance: 15,711; Referee: Viktor Kassai (Hungary)

24 October 2012 3	Málaga (Spain)	1–0	(Italy) Milan	Málaga, Spain
20:45 CEST	Joaquín 64'; Iturra (yellow card) 67'	Report	Montolivo (yellow card) 12'; Constant (yellow card) 43'; Mexès (yellow card) 43'; Bonera (yellow card) 69'	Stadium: La Rosaleda; Attendance: 27,683; Referee: Pedro Proença (Portugal)

6 November 2012 4	Milan (Italy)	1–1	(Spain) Málaga	Milan, Italy
20:45 CET	De Jong (yellow card) 34'; Emanuelson (yellow card) 43'; Montolivo (yellow card) 53'; Pato 73'	Report	Eliseu 40'; Iturra (yellow card) 59'; Weligton (yellow card) 64'; Sánchez (yellow card) 64'	Stadium: San Siro; Attendance: 30,891; Referee: Howard Webb (England)

21 November 2012 5	Zenit Saint Petersburg (Russia)	2–2	(Spain) Málaga	Saint Petersburg, Russia
20:45 CET	Danny (yellow card) 28', (goal) 49'; Anyukov (yellow card) 66'; Alves (yellow card) 70'; Fayzulin 86'	Report	Buonanotte 8', (yellow card) 36'; Fernández 9', (yellow card) 45+1'; Demichelis (yellow card) 14'	Stadium: Petrovsky Stadium; Attendance: 18,347; Referee: Olegário Benquerença (Portugal)

4 December 2012 6	Málaga (Spain)	2–2	(Belgium) Anderlecht	Málaga, Spain
20:45 CET	Duda (yellow card) 8' (goal) 45', 61'	Report	Kljestan (yellow card) 33'; Jovanović 50'; Safari (yellow card) 63'; Mbokani (yellow card) 77', (goal) 89'	Stadium: La Rosaleda; Attendance: 21,796; Referee: Deniz Aytekin (Germany)

==== Knockout phase ====
===== Round of 16 =====
19 February 2013 First leg	Porto (Portugal)	1–0	(Spain) Málaga	Porto, Portugal
20:45 CET	Moutinho 56'	Report	Iturra (yellow card) 75'	Stadium: Estádio do Dragão; Attendance: 42,209; Referee: Mark Clattenburg (England)

14 March 2013 Second leg	Málaga (Spain)	2–0 (2–1 agg.)	(Portugal) Porto	Málaga, Spain
20:45 CET	Demichelis (yellow card) 28'; Gámez (yellow card) 33'; Isco 43'; Toulalan (yellow card) 64'; Santa Cruz 77'	Report	Otamendi (yellow card) 17'; Defour (yellow card) 24' (yellow-red card) 49'; Alex Sandro (yellow card) 30'; Mangala (yellow card) 83'	Stadium: La Rosaleda Stadium; Attendance: 29,000; Referee: Nicola Rizzoli (Italy)

===== Quarter-finals =====
3 April 2013 First leg	Málaga (Spain)	0–0	(Germany) Borussia Dortmund	Málaga, Spain
20:45 CEST	Antunes (yellow card) 19'; Weligton (yellow card) 31'; Iturra (yellow card) 77'	Report	Großkreutz (yellow card) 17'	Stadium: La Rosaleda; Attendance: 28,548; Referee: Jonas Eriksson (Sweden)

9 April 2013 Second leg	Borussia Dortmund (Germany)	3–2 (3–2 agg.)	(Spain) Málaga	Dortmund, Germany
20:45 CEST	Bender (yellow card) 10'; Lewandowski 40'; Schmelzer (yellow card) 60'; Reus 90+1'; Santana 90+3'	Report	Joaquín 25'; Gámez (yellow card) 62'; Eliseu 82'; Toulalan (yellow card) 88'	Stadium: Signal Iduna Park; Attendance: 65,829; Referee: Craig Thomson (Scotland)

== Statistics ==
=== Goals ===
R	Player	Position	League	Copa del Rey	Europe	Total
1	(Paraguay) Roque Santa Cruz	CF	9	3	1	13
1	(Spain) Isco	AM	9	0	3	12
3	(Spain) Joaquín	RW	4	1	4	9
3	(Argentina) Javier Saviola	CF	8	0	1	9
5	(Portugal) Eliseu	LW	1	0	5	6
6	(Argentina) Martín Demichelis	CB	4	0	1	5
7	(Brazil) Júlio Baptista	AM	4	0	0	4
8	(Chile) Pedro Morales	AM	3	0	0	3
8	(Spain) Francisco Portillo	RW	2	1	0	3
8	(Spain) Ignacio Camacho	DM	2	1	0	3
8	(Portugal) Duda	LW	0	1	2	3
8	(Argentina) Diego Buonanotte	LW	1	2	1	4
13	(Brazil) Weligton	CB	2	0	0	2
13	(United States) Oguchi Onyewu	CB	0	2	0	2
13	(Uruguay) Seba Fernández	RW	0	1	1	2
16	(Cameroon) Fabrice Olinga	CF	1	0	0	1
16	(Spain) Juanmi	CF	1	0	0	1
16	(Spain) Nacho Monreal	LB	1	0	0	1
16	(Portugal) Vitorino Antunes	LB	1	0	0	1
16	(Chile) Manuel Iturra	DM	0	1	0	1
Total	N/A	N/A	53	13	19	85

Last updated: 2 June 2013
Source: Match reports in Competitive matches

== Pre-season and friendlies ==
17 July	Horadada	2–4	Málaga	Alicante, Spain
10:30 CEST	Kike 59'; Martín 86'		12' Fernández; 26' Toulalan; 37' Rondón; 42' Duda	Stadium: Pilar de la Horadada

21 July	Xerez	2–0	Málaga	Jerez de la Frontera, Spain
--:-- CEST	47' José Mari; 59' Maldonado			Stadium: Estadio Municipal de Chapín

26 July	Zamora FC (Venezuela)	0–3	Málaga	San Cristóbal, Táchira, Venezuela
−−:−− CEST		Report	48' Maresca; 63' Buonanotte; 72'Juanmi	Stadium: Estadio Polideportivo de Pueblo Nuevo; Attendance: 6800; Referee: Marlon Escalante; Man of the Match: Diego Buonanotte

29 July	Caracas (Venezuela)	2–2	Málaga	Caracas, Venezuela
22:30 CEST	Silva 48' (pen.); Lucas 60'	Report	Rondón 13'; 40' Weligton 40'	Stadium: Estadio Olímpico de la UCV; Attendance: 20,000

4 August	Juventus (Italy)	2–0	Málaga	Salerno, Italy
−−:−− CEST	Matri 5', 48'	Report		Stadium: Stadio Arechi; Attendance: 24,852; Referee: Domenico Celi

7 August	Olympiacos (Greece)	3–3	Málaga	Athens, Greece
−−:−− CEST	Mitroglou 55', 66'; Manolas 78'		Papazoglou 3' (o.g.); Eliseu 80'; Fernández 90'	Stadium: Karaiskakis Stadium; Attendance: 10,000; Referee: Tritsonis

11 August Trofeo Costa del Sol	Málaga	1–0	(England) Everton	Málaga, Spain
−−:−− CEST	Weligton 74'	Report		Stadium: La Rosaleda; Attendance: 6,000; Referee: Pérez Montero

== See also ==
- 2012–13 Copa del Rey
- 2012–13 La Liga
