= 2007 Supercopa de España =

Sevilla	Real Madrid
6	3
- on aggregate

First leg
Sevilla	Real Madrid
1	0
- Date: 11 August 2007
- Venue: Ramón Sánchez Pizjuán, Seville
- Referee: Alfonso Pérez Burrull
- Attendance: 45,000

Second leg
Real Madrid	Sevilla
3	5
- Date: 19 August 2007
- Venue: Santiago Bernabéu, Madrid
- Referee: Alberto Undiano Mallenco
- Attendance: 69,000

The 2007 Supercopa de España was two-leg Spanish football matches played on 11 August and 19 August 2007. It contested by Sevilla, who were Copa del Rey winners in 2006–07, and Real Madrid, who won the 2006–07 La Liga. Sevilla won 6–3 on aggregate.

== Match details ==
=== First leg ===
11 August 2007
22:00 CET

Sevilla	1–0	Real Madrid
Luís Fabiano 27' (pen.)	Report

Ramón Sánchez Pizjuán, Seville
Attendance: 45,000
Referee: Alfonso Pérez Burrull

Sevilla	Real Madrid

GK	1	(Spain) Andrés Palop
RB	4	(Brazil) Dani Alves
CB	23	(Netherlands) Khalid Boulahrouz
CB	3	(Serbia) Ivica Dragutinović
LB	16	(Spain) Antonio Puerta
DM	18	(Spain) José Luis Martí (c)
DM	21	(Mali) Seydou Keita
RW	7	(Spain) Jesús Navas	(substituted off) 73'
AM	11	(Brazil) Renato	(substituted off) 56'
LW	5	(Portugal) Duda	(substituted off) 66'
CF	10	(Brazil) Luís Fabiano
Subs:
GK	29	(Spain) Pablo Vargas
DF	28	(Argentina) Federico Fazio
MF	8	(Denmark) Christian Poulsen
MF	17	(Spain) Diego Capel	(substituted on) 66'
MF	20	(Belgium) Tom De Mul	(substituted on) 56'
MF	25	(Italy) Enzo Maresca	(substituted on) 73'
FW	9	(Russia) Aleksandr Kerzhakov
Manager:
(Spain) Juande Ramos

GK	1	(Spain) Iker Casillas
RB	4	(Spain) Sergio Ramos
CB	3	(Portugal) Pepe
CB	5	(Italy) Fabio Cannavaro
LB	22	(Spain) Miguel Torres
DM	6	(Mali) Mahamadou Diarra
CM	16	(Argentina) Fernando Gago	(substituted off) 46'
CM	14	(Spain) Guti
RW	28	(Equatorial Guinea) Javier Balboa	(substituted off) 62'
LW	10	(Brazil) Robinho
CF	7	(Spain) Raúl (c)
Subs:
GK	13	(Spain) Jordi Codina
DF	2	(Spain) Míchel Salgado
MF	11	(Netherlands) Arjen Robben
MF	26	(Spain) Rubén de la Red
FW	9	(Spain) Roberto Soldado
FW	19	(Brazil) Júlio Baptista	(substituted on) 46'
FW	24	(Argentina) Javier Saviola	(substituted on) 62'
Manager:
(Germany) Bernd Schuster

=== Second leg ===
19 August 2007
22:00 CET

Real Madrid	3–5	Sevilla
Drenthe 23'; Cannavaro 44'; Ramos 78'	Report	Renato 16', 27'; Kanouté 37' (pen.), 80', 89'

Santiago Bernabéu, Madrid
Attendance: 69,000
Referee: Alberto Undiano Mallenco

Real Madrid	Sevilla

GK	1	(Spain) Iker Casillas
RB	4	(Spain) Sergio Ramos	(yellow card) 64'
CB	3	(Portugal) Pepe	(yellow card) 8' (yellow-red card) 90'
CB	5	(Italy) Fabio Cannavaro
LB	22	(Spain) Miguel Torres		(substituted off) 46'
DM	6	(Mali) Mahamadou Diarra
CM	15	(Netherlands) Royston Drenthe
CM	23	(Netherlands) Wesley Sneijder		(substituted off) 82'
RW	10	(Brazil) Robinho
LW	7	(Spain) Raúl (c)		(substituted off) 63'
CF	17	(Netherlands) Ruud van Nistelrooy
Subs:
MF	14	(Spain) Guti	(yellow card) 59'	(substituted on) 46'
FW	24	(Argentina) Javier Saviola		(substituted on) 63'
FW	19	(Brazil) Júlio Baptista		(substituted on) 82'
Manager:
(Germany) Bernd Schuster

GK	1	(Spain) Andrés Palop
RB	4	(Brazil) Dani Alves	(yellow card) 34'
CB	15	(Colombia) Aquivaldo Mosquera		(substituted off) 46'
CB	28	(Argentina) Federico Fazio
LB	3	(Serbia) Ivica Dragutinović
DM	18	(Spain) José Luis Martí (c)
DM	8	(Denmark) Christian Poulsen
RW	7	(Spain) Jesús Navas
AM	11	(Brazil) Renato	(yellow card) 79'	(substituted off) 80'
LW	5	(Portugal) Duda	(yellow card) 69'	(substituted off) 70'
CF	12	(Mali) Frédéric Kanouté
Subs:
MF	21	(Mali) Seydou Keita		(substituted on) 46'
FW	9	(Russia) Aleksandr Kerzhakov		(substituted on) 70'
MF	25	(Italy) Enzo Maresca	(yellow card) 83'	(substituted on) 80'
Manager:
(Spain) Juande Ramos

== See also ==
- 2007–08 La Liga
- 2007–08 Copa del Rey
- 2007–08 Real Madrid CF season
- 2007–08 Sevilla FC season
