= Pablo Blanco =

Spanish footballer

Personal information
- Full name: Pablo José Blanco Blanco
- Date of birth: 15 December 1951 (age 74)
- Place of birth: Seville, Spain
- Height: 1.77 m (5 ft 10 in)
- Position: Centre-back

Youth career
- Círculo Don Bosco
- 1967–1970: Sevilla

Senior career*
Years	Team	Apps	(Gls)
1970–1972	Sevilla B		
1972–1984	Sevilla	342	(9)

International career
1975	Spain U23	1	(0)
- * Club domestic league appearances and goals

Pablo José Blanco Blanco (born 15 December 1951) is a Spanish former footballer who played as a central defender.

== Club career ==
Born in Seville, Andalusia, Blanco spent his entire professional career with Sevilla FC after joining the club's academy at the age of 15. He made his debut in La Liga on 5 March 1972, playing 60 minutes in the 1–0 away loss against Sporting de Gijón. He added a further four appearances during that season, and his team was relegated.

Blanco and Sevilla returned to the top tier after a further three campaigns in the Segunda División. He scored his first goal in the competition on 22 January 1978, but in a 2–1 away defeat to RCD Español. He retired at the end of 1983–84 at 32, having contributed 20 matches to an eight-place finish. Six of his seven UEFA Cup games took place in the 1982–83 edition which ended in the round of 16, his first being on 15 September 1982 in a 3–1 home victory over PFC Levski Sofia where he featured the full 90 minutes.

On 16 December 2017, in a league match against Levante UD where he came off the bench, Jesús Navas – also brought up at the Ramón Sánchez Pizjuán Stadium – surpassed Blanco's record of 415 competitive matches for the same club. The latter continued to work with Sevilla after his retirement, as youth system coordinator.

== See also ==
- List of one-club men
