= Tom De Mul =

Belgian footballer

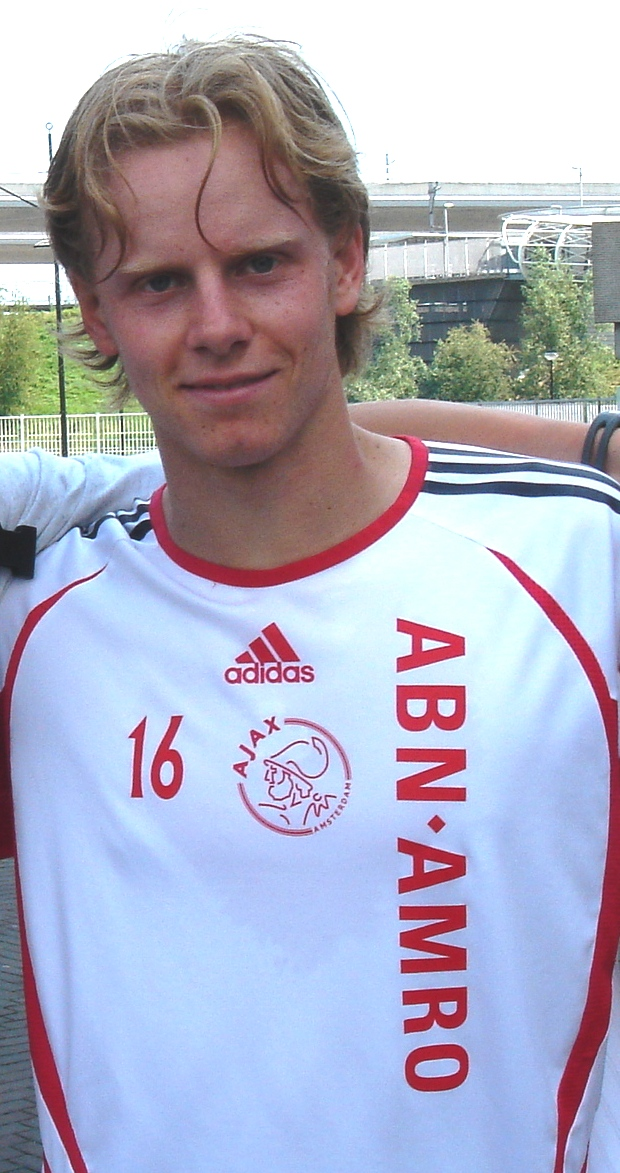
- De Mul training with Ajax in 2007

Personal information
- Date of birth: 4 March 1986 (age 40)
- Place of birth: Kapellen, Belgium
- Height: 1.78 m (5 ft 10 in)
- Position: Winger

Youth career
- 1999–2001: Germinal Beerschot
- 2002–2005: Ajax

Senior career*
Years	Team	Apps	(Gls)
2004–2007	Ajax	36	(5)
2005–2006	→ Vitesse (loan)	27	(2)
2007–2012	Sevilla	9	(1)
2009	→ Genk (loan)	12	(4)
2010–2011	→ Standard Liège (loan)	0	(0)
Total		84	(12)

International career
2001–2002	Belgium U16	13	(2)
2002	Belgium U17	4	(0)
2004–2008	Belgium U21	21	(4)
2007	Belgium	2	(0)
- * Club domestic league appearances and goals

Tom De Mul (Dutch pronunciation: [ˈtɔm də ˈmʏl]; born 4 March 1986) is a Belgian former professional footballer who played as a right winger.

== Club career ==
Born in Kapellen, Antwerp, De Mul began his career in K.F.C. Germinal Beerschot, but joined the AFC Ajax youth academy at age 15 like compatriot Thomas Vermaelen a year before. He made his first-team debut on 25 January 2004 against NEC Nijmegen, but appeared only eight times in the Eredivisie in his first two years combined.

After a solid 2005–06 (spent on loan) at Vitesse Arnhem, De Mul returned to Amsterdam and figured prominently during his first full year, starting in 23 of the 28 matches he appeared in. In the subsequent off-season he signed with Spanish side Sevilla FC for five years, but spent the vast majority of his first seasons barred by Jesús Navas, a club youth product; however, on 16 November 2008, having only played five minutes at Getafe CF, he scored in a 2–0 La Liga away win.

On 15 January 2009, De Mul agreed to be loaned to K.R.C. Genk, thus returning to his country. Seriously injured during the summer, he spent the entire 2009–10 and 2011–12 campaigns on the sidelines, eventually leaving the Andalusians on 30 June 2012 after his contract expired.

On 22 May 2014, almost two years after his contract with Sevilla expired, De Mul announced his retirement from football citing recurrent injuries.

== International career ==
In June 2007, De Mul earned his two caps for the Belgium national team at senior level during UEFA Euro 2008 qualifying, making his debut on the 2nd as a 61st-minute substitute for François Sterchele in a 2–1 loss to Portugal at the Stade Roi Baudouin in Brussels. He started four days later, in a 2–0 defeat in Finland.

De Mul started in all six matches in the 2008 Summer Olympics, as the nation came fourth in China.

== Honours ==
Ajax

- Eredivisie: 2003–04
- KNVB Cup: 2006–07
- Johan Cruyff Shield: 2006

Sevilla

- Supercopa de España: 2007

Genk

- Belgian Cup: 2008–09
