= Enzo Maresca =

Italian football manager and player (born 1980)

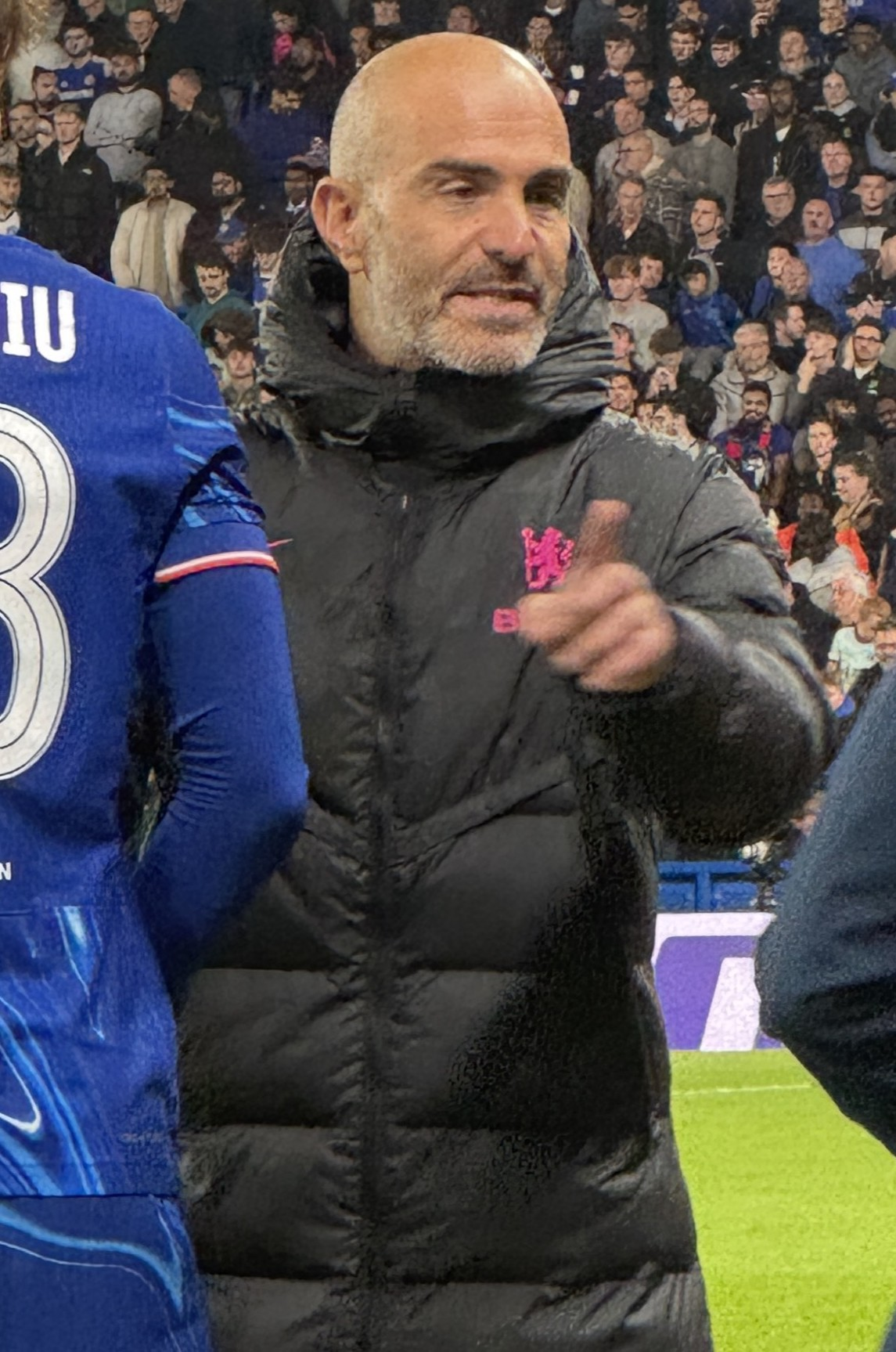
- Maresca with Chelsea in 2024

Personal information
- Full name: Enzo Maresca
- Date of birth: 10 February 1980 (age 46)
- Place of birth: Pontecagnano Faiano, Italy
- Height: 1.77 m (5 ft 10 in)
- Position: Midfielder

Team information
- Current team: Manchester City (manager)

Youth career
- 1991–1994: AC Milan
- 1994–1998: Cagliari

Senior career*
Years	Team	Apps	(Gls)
1998–2000	West Bromwich Albion	47	(5)
2000–2004	Juventus	37	(4)
2000–2001	→ Bologna (loan)	23	(0)
2002–2003	→ Piacenza (loan)	31	(9)
2004–2005	Fiorentina	25	(5)
2005–2009	Sevilla	96	(13)
2009–2010	Olympiacos	24	(5)
2011–2012	Málaga	39	(4)
2012–2014	Sampdoria	17	(3)
2014–2016	Palermo	47	(1)
2016–2017	Hellas Verona	8	(0)
Total		394	(49)

International career
1995	Italy U14	5	(0)
1995	Italy U16	1	(0)
1998	Italy U17	1	(1)
1998–1999	Italy U18	12	(4)
1999–2000	Italy U20	11	(6)
2000–2002	Italy U21	15	(2)

Managerial career
- 2017: Ascoli (assistant)
- 2017–2018: Sevilla (assistant)
- 2018–2019: West Ham United (assistant)
- 2020–2021: Manchester City U23
- 2021: Parma
- 2022–2023: Manchester City (assistant)
- 2023–2024: Leicester City
- 2024–2026: Chelsea
- 2026–: Manchester City
- * Club domestic league appearances and goals

Enzo Maresca (born 10 February 1980) is an Italian professional football manager and former player who is currently the manager of Premier League club Manchester City.

Maresca began his professional career as a midfielder with West Bromwich Albion in 1998. He joined Juventus in 2000 and won Serie A in 2002, and went on loan to Bologna and Piacenza. After a brief stint with Fiorentina, Maresca joined Sevilla in 2005 and won the Copa del Rey, Supercopa de España and UEFA Super Cup once each, and the UEFA Cup twice. Maresca played for Olympiacos, Málaga and Sampdoria between 2009 and 2014 before signing with Palermo, where he won the Serie B title. He joined Hellas Verona in 2016 and retired in 2017. He represented Italy at youth level, including the Italy under-21 team, but was never capcapped at senior level.

Maresca began his coaching career as an assistant with Ascoli in 2017. In 2020, he joined Manchester City EDS, winning Premier League 2 in 2021. He began his senior coaching career with Parma in 2021, but was dismissed that same year and returned to Manchester City as an assistant in 2022. Maresca joined Leicester City as head coach in 2023 and won the EFL Championship in 2024. He signed with Chelsea that same year, where he won the UEFA Conference League and the FIFA Club World Cup in 2025, but departed in 2026. That same year, it was announced that he would be the new manager for Manchester City after the former manager Pep Guardiola left.

== Club career ==
=== Early years ===
Born in Pontecagnano Faiano, Province of Salerno, Maresca started playing football at the age of 11 with AC Milan and joined Cagliari after three years.

Maresca started his professional career with English club West Bromwich Albion, despite having "no grasp of the English language". He made his debut in a 2–0 home defeat against Bradford City on 20 September 1998, and played two incomplete seasons with the English club in the Football League First Division.

=== Juventus ===
In January 2000, Maresca moved back to Italy and joined Juventus in a transfer worth £4.3 million, a club-record sale for Albion at the time. He played in one Serie A game before the end of the season.

For two of the following three seasons, Maresca was loaned to fellow league teams Bologna and Piacenza—a co-ownership deal in the latter case—scoring nine goals in the 2002–03 season but suffering team relegation. During the previous campaign, he notably netted an important equaliser in the Derby della Mole return leg, against neighbouring Torino; he attracted controversy, however, when he celebrated the goal by mimicking an earlier 'bull-horn' goal celebration by Torino's Marco Ferrante (the bull being a club symbol as it is Turin's coat of arms, and the side also being known in its contracted form as "Toro", bull in Italian). Juventus subsequently bought the remaining 50% of his rights for €2.6 million.

=== Fiorentina ===
In the summer of 2004, Fiorentina signed Maresca along with Fabrizio Miccoli and Giorgio Chiellini for €13 million, with Juventus holding half of the players' rights. He made his official debut on 12 September, playing 60 minutes in a 0–1 away defeat to Roma.

At the end of the season, with the Viola narrowly avoiding top-level relegation, Juventus bought back all three for around €6.7 million in a blind auction between the clubs. Maresca's cost was only about €7,000, but an additional €420,000 agent fee in order to keep the player was also involved.

=== Sevilla ===
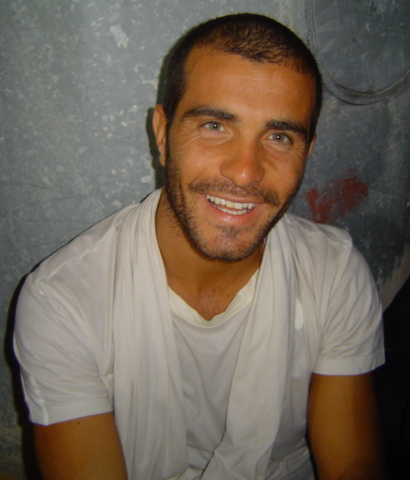
Maresca in 2008

On 16 July 2005, Maresca transferred to Sevilla for a fee of €2.5 million on a four-year contract. In his first season in La Liga, he played 29 games and scored eight goals. He played eleven games and scored three goals in the side's victorious campaign in the UEFA Cup. This included scoring twice in the final against Middlesbrough (4–0), in which he was also named man of the match. Maresca donated €10,000 prize money to the San Juan de Dios hospital in Seville. He scored a late penalty, after coming off the bench, to seal a 3–0 win over Barcelona in 2006 UEFA Super Cup.

Maresca played 45 minutes in the 2007 UEFA Cup final at Hampden Park, as Sevilla successfully defended its European title against Espanyol.

=== Olympiacos ===
On 13 July 2009, Maresca transferred to Greek club Olympiacos in a three-year deal. He scored in his Super League debut, a 2–0 win at AEL, and appeared regularly during the 2009–10 campaign as the Piraeus-based club finished in second position.

=== Málaga ===
After terminating his contract with Olympiacos in August 2010, Maresca trained with former club Fiorentina in order to maintain match fitness. On 7 December, it was announced that he had been in talks with Málaga; after undergoing a medical examination, he signed with the Andalusians until June 2012. Maresca made his league debut for his new team on 8 January 2011, playing 57 minutes in a 1–1 home draw against Athletic Bilbao. On 7 May, he contributed with one goal to the team's 3–0 success at Atlético Madrid.

Maresca appeared in 19 matches in the 2011–12 season (nine starts, two goals) as his team finished in fourth position and qualified for the UEFA Champions League for the first time in its history.

=== Return to Italy ===
On 2 July 2012, as his contract was about to expire, Maresca signed a new one-year contract with Málaga; but then returned to Italy to join Sampdoria for free at the end of August. On 4 November, he scored his second goal of the season via a bicycle kick, in a 2–1 home defeat to Atalanta.

In January 2014, after having featured rarely in the first half of the new campaign, he agreed on a return to the Serie B and joined league leaders Palermo, who were in need of a playmaker. Maresca made 13 league appearances as Palermo finished the season as champions. In September, he underwent an operation due to acute appendicitis, and the following January, he signed a contract extension to keep him at the club until 2016.

On the final day of the 2015–16 Serie A season, Maresca scored in a 3–2 home win over Hellas Verona to help save his team from relegation. Ahead of the following season, now a free agent, he joined the relegated opposition. In January 2017, Maresca terminated his contract with Hellas, and retired from playing the following month, on his 37th birthday.

== International career ==
Maresca was selected by the Italy under-20 team for the 2000 Toulon Tournament, and finished runner-up with the under-18s in the 1999 UEFA European Championship.

He also represented the under-21 side for two years between 2000 and 2002, although he missed the 2002 UEFA European Championship tournament in Switzerland due to injury as the nation went on to reach the semi-finals of the tournament. He was never capped at full level.

== Style of play ==
Maresca was capable of playing anywhere in midfield; while he was often deployed as a deep-lying playmaker, due to his ability to orchestrate his team's offensive moves and create goalscoring opportunities, his preferred position was in a box-to-box role, either as a central or attacking midfielder. He also played as a mezzala. Emiliano Mondonico, Maresca's former manager at Fiorentina, described him as a "complete player".

== Coaching career ==
=== Early career ===
On 1 June 2017, Maresca was unveiled as part of the non-playing staff of Serie B club Ascoli for the upcoming season. As he did not have the required coaching badges by the time of the hiring, he was officially appointed as assistant to new head coach Fulvio Fiorin, formerly a youth manager and scout for Milan.

Maresca joined Sevilla as one of Vincenzo Montella’s assistant managers at the beginning of 2017 and remained in the role until Montella was sacked in April 2018.

Maresca started his career in England at West Ham United as one of Manuel Pellegrini’s assistant managers from July 2018 until December 2019. Maresca signed a three-year contract with the Hammers in June 2018 after arriving from Sevilla at Pellegrini’s request. However, he left West Ham United after Pellegrini was dismissed, despite being offered the opportunity to remain under David Moyes.

In August 2020, Maresca was hired by Manchester City as manager of their Elite Development Squad. He won the Premier League 2 title in his only season in charge of the Elite Development Squad.

On 27 May 2021, Maresca was hired as the new head coach of Parma, who played in Serie B in the 2021–22 season. Maresca failed in leading Parma into the promotion spots, being eventually dismissed on 23 November 2021.

In June 2022, Maresca returned to Manchester City as an assistant manager under Pep Guardiola, replacing Juanma Lillo, who left the club to manage Al-Sadd. Maresca was part of Guardiola's coaching staff during Manchester City's treble-winning 2022–23 season before later managing Leicester City and Chelsea.

=== Leicester City ===
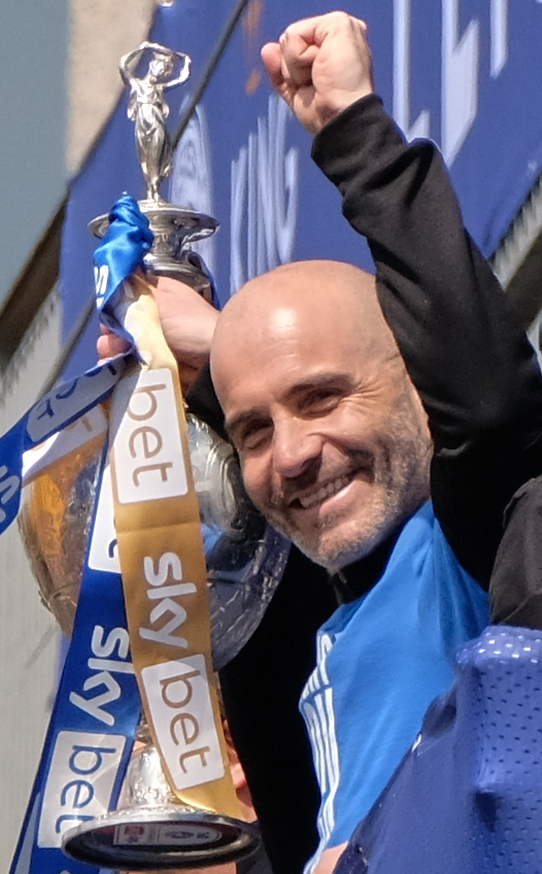
Maresca as manager of Leicester City after winning the 2023–24 EFL Championship

On 16 June 2023, Maresca was appointed manager of Championship club Leicester City, having signed a three-year contract with the newly relegated English club. He spent his first two months living at the club's training base.

His first game in charge was an M69 derby on 6 August against Coventry City, ending with a 2–1 victory for Leicester. After starting the season with a 100% record in their first four matches in the Championship, Maresca was named the EFL Championship Manager of the Month in August. In October, he won the award for a second time, after leading Leicester to another perfect record, getting six wins and 15 goals from six matches. In December, he won the award for the third time, after leading Leicester to end the calendar year at the top of the league, getting six wins and 18 goals from seven matches. His Leicester side secured promotion back to the Premier League on 26 April 2024, becoming Championship champions on 29 April following a 3–0 away victory over Preston North End. He was awarded with another EFL Manager of the Month in April, his fourth in the season, for collecting 15 points in seven games.

=== Chelsea ===
On 3 June 2024, Premier League club Chelsea announced that Maresca would be joining as head coach on 1 July, signing a five-year deal with an option to extend for a further year.

Maresca's first game in charge, on 18 August, ended in a 2–0 home defeat to champions Manchester City. A week later, he achieved his first Premier League win as Chelsea manager by beating Wolverhampton Wanderers 6–2, including a hat-trick from Noni Madueke. Three consecutive wins, over Bournemouth, West Ham United and Brighton & Hove Albion, led to the best start in a Premier League season by the club since 2021 and Maresca was named Premier League Manager of the Month. By December, Chelsea were seen as potential title contenders, which Maresca played down. In the end, Maresca led Chelsea to a fourth place finish, the first time that the club qualified for the UEFA Champions League since the 2021–22 season under Thomas Tuchel.

On 28 May 2025, Maresca won his first trophy as the Chelsea manager by winning the UEFA Conference League after beating Real Betis 4–1 in the final, which meant that Chelsea became the only team to win all three of the current main UEFA competitions. On 13 July, he guided his team to victory in the 2025 FIFA Club World Cup, the first edition of the expanded competition, with a 3–0 win over the recently crowned Champions League winners, Paris Saint-Germain, in the final.

Maresca celebrating after Chelsea defeated PSG to win the 2025 Club World Cup Final

After Estevão Willian scored the winner in the fifth minute of added time in a 2–1 league victory over Liverpool at Stamford Bridge on 4 October 2025, Maresca sprinted down the touchline to celebrate with his players and was dismissed for receiving a second yellow card. The Athletic reported that the wild celebration would "endear him to Chelsea fans" and framed it as a breakthrough moment in strengthening his bond with the home support, with assistant Willy Caballero adding that such occasions help create a more intimidating matchday environment at Stamford Bridge.

On 13 December 2025, after a 2–0 league victory over Everton at Stamford Bridge, Maresca made comments describing his treatment as the "worst 48 hours" as Chelsea head coach. It was announced on 1 January that he was stepping down, following tensions with the club's owners.

=== Manchester City ===
On 29 June 2026, Maresca returned to Manchester City signing a three-year deal, replacing Pep Guardiola as the new manager. In a statement, Chelsea stated they believed that Maresca has had "a strong desire" to succeed Pep Guardiola at Manchester City declaring that they "felt let down as [they] believed that his head and heart were focused on another club and another opportunity". Manchester City and Chelsea have agreed a compensation deal believed to be around £17m with Maresca personally agreeing a compensation deal with Chelsea on top of this. In a statement, released by Manchester City, Maresca said “City is an incredibly well-run football club. Everything they do is innovative, planned and purposeful. For a manager, that is a dream situation. It provides the consistency I need to do my job effectively”. Maresca spent heavily in the 2026 summer transfer window, notably signing Enzo Fernandez and Elliot Anderson.

In October 2026, Maresca became the first manager in Premier League history to win his first seven matches in charge of a new club, following Manchester City's victory over Ipswich Town at the Etihad Stadium. He surpassed the previous record of six consecutive wins, jointly held by Pep Guardiola, Carlo Ancelotti, and Ole Gunnar Solskjær, who achieved the feat with Manchester City, Chelsea, and Manchester United, respectively.

== Manager profile ==
=== Tactics ===
Maresca's tactical approach is influenced by that of his mentor Pep Guardiola, under whom he served as an assistant manager at Manchester City. He also drew from his experiences playing under managers Marcello Lippi, Carlo Ancelotti, and Manuel Pellegrini. Maresca's style – nicknamed Marescaball in the press – is built on balance, and is characterised not only by maintaining ball possession, creating chances, scoring goals, and building plays from deep, with defenders and goalkeepers passing out from the back, but also by remaining defensively solid. Regarding his philosophy and his thesis at the Coverciano coaching course entitled "Football and Chess", Maresca stated in a 2021 interview with La Gazzetta dello Sport: "The most important is positional play and strategy. For a coach, it's important to have the mentality of a chess player: develop a plan, study counter moves, choose the arrangement of the pieces."

His teams normally play a 4–3–3 formation, or occasionally a 4–2–3–1, which becomes a 3–5–2 formation when in possession of the ball, with the right-back inverting into midfield and the central midfielders pushing up the pitch in order to create a numerical advantage across the pitch through the offensive movement of his players. Off the ball, his teams make use of heavy man-to-man counter-pressing, with the aim of winning the ball back further up the field. When pressing is not possible, his teams often drop into a more defensive 4–4–2 block. His contemporary, Mikel Arteta, credited Maresca with building a young Chelsea side into the best attacking team in the league "by a mile".

== Personal life ==
Maresca is married to Maria Jesus Pariente. The couple have four children.

== Career statistics ==
Appearances and goals by club, season and competition
Club	Season	League			National Cup (Note: Includes FA Cup, Coppa Italia, Copa del Rey, Greek Cup)		League Cup (Note: Includes EFL Cup)		Europe		Other		Total	
Club	Season	Division	Apps	Goals	Apps	Goals	Apps	Goals	Apps	Goals	Apps	Goals	Apps	Goals
West Bromwich Albion	1998–99	First Division	22	2	1	0	0	0	—		—		23	2
West Bromwich Albion	1999–2000	First Division	25	3	1	0	3	0	—		—		29	3
West Bromwich Albion	Total		47	5	2	0	3	0	—		—		52	5
Juventus	1999–2000	Serie A	1	0	0	0	—		0	0	—		1	0
Juventus	2000–01	Serie A	0	0	0	0	—		0	0	—		0	0
Juventus	2001–02	Serie A	16	1	4	1	—		8 (Note: Appearances in UEFA Champions League)	0	—		28	2
Juventus	2002–03	Serie A	0	0	0	0	—		0	0	—		0	0
Juventus	2003–04	Serie A	20	3	7	0	—		2	1	0	0	29	4
Juventus	Total		37	4	11	1	—		10	1	0	0	58	6
Bologna (loan)	2000–01	Serie A	23	0	0	0	—		—		—		23	0
Piacenza (loan)	2002–03	Serie A	31	9	0	0	—		—		—		31	9
Fiorentina	2004–05	Serie A	25	4	3	1	—		—		—		28	5
Sevilla	2005–06	La Liga	29	8	2	0	—		11 (Note: Appearances in UEFA Cup)	3	—		42	11
Sevilla	2006–07	La Liga	25	2	7	1	—		7	2	1 (Note: Appearances in UEFA Super Cup)	1	40	6
Sevilla	2007–08	La Liga	21	1	2	0	—		4	0	3 (Note: Two appearances in Supercopa de España, one appearance in UEFA Super Cup)	0	30	1
Sevilla	2008–09	La Liga	21	2	3	1	—		5	0	—		29	3
Sevilla	Total		96	13	14	2	—		27	5	4	1	141	21
Olympiacos	2009–10	Super League Greece	24	5	1	0	—		10	1	—		35	6
Olympiacos	2010–11	Super League Greece	0	0	0	0	—		4 (Note: Appearances in UEFA Europa League)	2	—		4	2
Olympiacos	Total		24	5	1	0	—		14	3	—		39	8
Málaga	2010–11	La Liga	20	2	1	0	—		—		—		21	2
Málaga	2011–12	La Liga	19	2	1	0	—		—		—		20	2
Málaga	2012–13	La Liga	0	0	0	0	—		1	0	—		1	0
Málaga	Total		39	4	2	0	—		1	0	—		42	4
Sampdoria	2012–13	Serie A	16	3	0	0	—		—		—		16	3
Sampdoria	2013–14	Serie A	1	0	2	0	—		—		—		3	0
Sampdoria	Total		17	3	2	0	—		—		—		19	3
Palermo	2013–14	Serie B	13	0	0	0	—		—		—		13	0
Palermo	2014–15	Serie A	19	0	1	0	—		—		—		20	0
Palermo	2015–16	Serie A	15	1	1	0	—		—		—		16	1
Palermo	Total		47	1	2	0	—		—		—		49	1
Hellas Verona	2016–17	Serie A	8	0	1	0	—		—		—		9	0
Career total			394	49	37	4	3	0	52	9	4	1	490	63

== Managerial statistics ==
As of match played 21 November 2026

Managerial record by team and tenure
Team	Nat.	From	To	Record								Ref.
Team	Nat.	From	To	G	W	D	L	GF	GA	GD	Win %	Ref.
Parma	(Italy)	27 May 2021	23 November 2021	14	4	5	5	18	21	−3	28.57	
Leicester City	(England)	16 June 2023	3 June 2024	53	36	4	13	103	50	+53	67.92	
Chelsea	(England)	1 July 2024	1 January 2026	92	55	16	21	191	98	+93	59.78	
Manchester City	(England)	29 June 2026	Present	18	11	2	5	41	26	+15	61.11	
Career Total				177	106	27	44	353	195	+158	59.89	

== Honours ==
=== Player ===
Juventus

- Serie A: 2001–02

Sevilla

- Copa del Rey: 2006–07
- Supercopa de España: 2007
- UEFA Cup: 2005–06, 2006–07
- UEFA Super Cup: 2006

Palermo

- Serie B: 2013–14

=== Manager ===
Manchester City EDS

- Premier League 2: 2020–21

Leicester City

- EFL Championship: 2023–24

Chelsea

- UEFA Conference League: 2024–25
- FIFA Club World Cup: 2025

Individual

- Premier League Manager of the Month: September 2024, November 2025
- EFL Championship Manager of the Month: August 2023, October 2023, December 2023, April 2024
