= Jesús Navas =

Spanish footballer (born 1985)

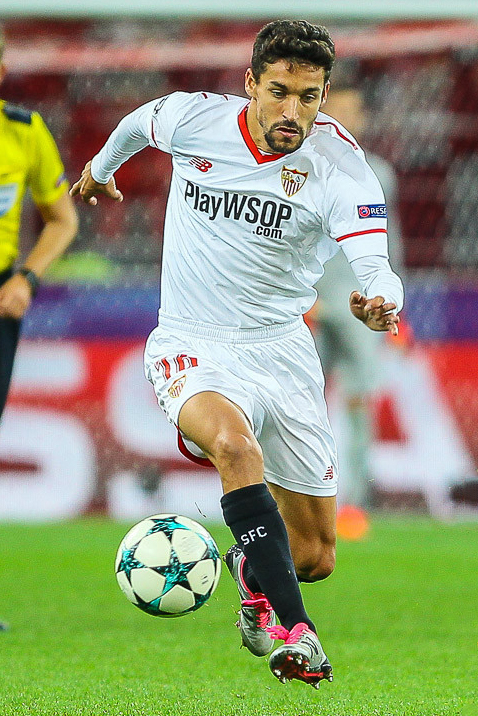
- Navas playing for Sevilla in 2017

Personal information
- Full name: Jesús Navas González
- Date of birth: 21 November 1985 (age 40)
- Place of birth: Los Palacios y Villafranca, Spain
- Height: 1.70 m (5 ft 7 in)
- Positions: Right-back; right winger

Youth career
- 1998–2000: Los Palacios
- 2000–2003: Sevilla

Senior career*
Years	Team	Apps	(Gls)
2003–2004	Sevilla B	33	(3)
2003–2013	Sevilla	285	(23)
2013–2017	Manchester City	123	(4)
2017–2024	Sevilla	231	(3)
Total		672	(33)

International career
2004–2005	Spain U21	5	(0)
2009–2024	Spain	56	(5)
Medal record
Representing Spain
FIFA World Cup
Winner	2010 South Africa	Team
UEFA European Championship
Winner	2012 Poland-Ukraine	Team
Winner	2024 Germany	Team
UEFA Nations League
Winner	2023 Netherlands	Team
FIFA Confederations Cup
Runner-up	2013 Brazil	Team
- * Club domestic league appearances and goals

Jesús Navas González (Spanish pronunciation: [xeˈsus ˈnaβas ɣonˈθaleθ]; (Note: In isolation, González is pronounced [ɡonˈθaleθ].) born 21 November 1985) is a Spanish former professional footballer who played as a right-back or right winger.

He spent the vast majority of his career with Sevilla, winning eight major titles including four UEFA Cups/Europa Leagues and two Copas del Rey. In 2013 he signed for Manchester City, where he won the 2013–14 Premier League. He re-joined Sevilla in 2017, going on to hold the club's record for most competitive appearances at 705.

A Spain international from 2009 to 2024, Navas helped his country to win the 2010 World Cup, two European Championships and the 2022–23 Nations League, earning 56 caps and scoring five goals.

== Club career ==
=== Sevilla ===
Born in Los Palacios y Villafranca, Province of Seville, Navas joined Sevilla's youth system at age 15. In 2003–04, he made his first-team (and La Liga) debut when he played 12 minutes in a 1–0 loss at Espanyol on 23 November 2003. He added four more appearances before the season was over, and in 2004–05 he was permanently promoted to the main squad, scoring two goals from 22 games. On 3 May 2005, his contract was extended until 2010.

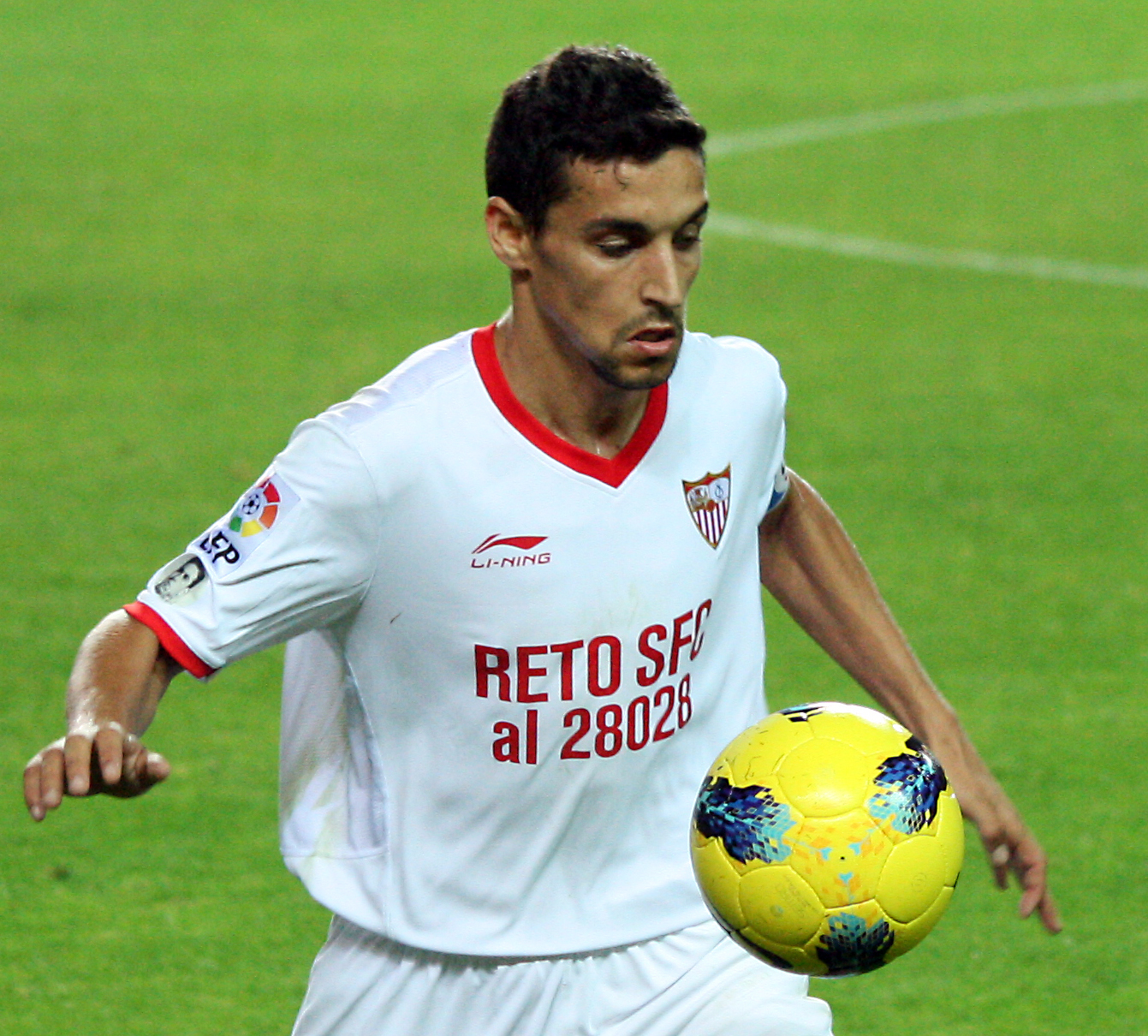
Navas with Sevilla in 2011

In 2005–06, Navas once again impressed, being crucial as the Andalusians claimed victory in that campaign's UEFA Cup; he appeared in all 12 matches in the competition, including the final against Middlesbrough. A deal was arranged for a transfer to Chelsea in August 2006, but the player declined the move citing possible homesickness. He was consistently listed among the best players in the league, appearing in Don Balón magazine's Top 50 each year from 2006 to 2008.

For the next three years, Navas continued to be a regular for Sevilla, always leading the team in assists while adding nine league goals in total. He also helped them to the 2006–07 edition of the Copa del Rey, and to third place in the domestic championship two seasons later.

Navas was ever-present in the 2009–10 campaign, appearing in more than 50 games. He provided nine decisive passes (including two in the last round against Almería as Sevilla edged Mallorca for fourth place with a 3–2 away win). On 19 May 2010, he scored the second goal in a 2–0 victory in the final of the Copa del Rey against Atlético Madrid.

Navas' 2010–11 season was greatly undermined by injury, as he appeared in less than half Sevilla's matches. On 13 March 2011, he scored a rare header in a 1–1 home draw against eventual champions Barcelona, one of only two competitive goals.

=== Manchester City ===
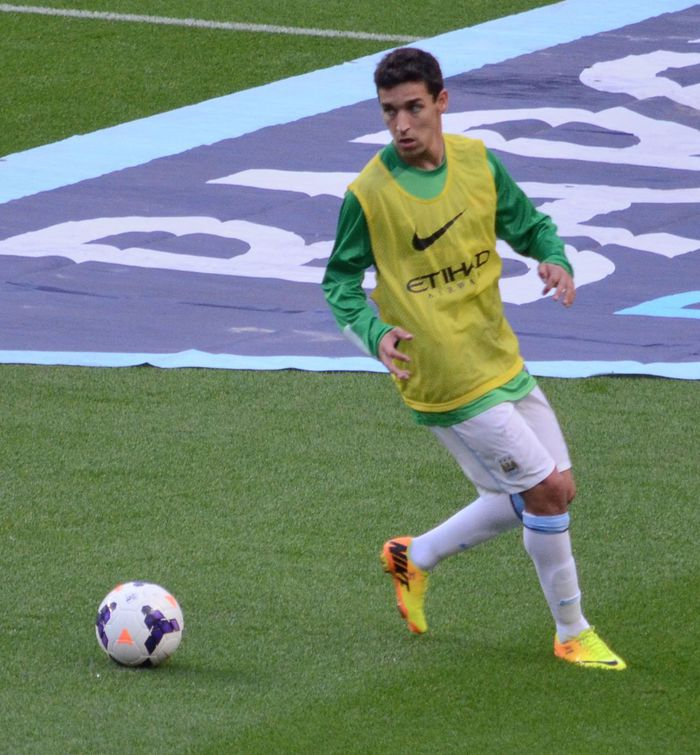
Navas warming up for Manchester City in 2013

On 4 June 2013, after speculation concerning Navas' future, Sevilla confirmed that he was leaving the club with the expectation of joining Premier League side Manchester City. The transfer, reportedly valued at £14.9 million, was completed seven days later; the player said "this is the right moment for me to take this step. I'm very happy with the opportunity and the decision."

Navas made his league debut on 19 August 2013, playing the full 90 minutes in a 4–0 home win against Newcastle United. He scored his first two goals in the competition on 24 November in a 6–0 home rout of Tottenham Hotspur.

On 2 March 2014, Navas scored City's third goal in the League Cup final as they defeated Sunderland 3–1 to win the competition. He appeared in 48 games in all competitions in his first season (scoring six goals), helping the club to win the fourth national championship in its history.

Navas returned to the Ramón Sánchez Pizjuán Stadium on 3 November 2015, playing the full 90 minutes in a 3–1 win in the group stage of the UEFA Champions League and assisting Wilfried Bony for the last goal. In the League Cup final, he came on as a substitute and scored one of the penalties in the shootout in a victory over Liverpool.

Late in the 2016–17 campaign, Navas was reconverted by new manager Pep Guardiola into a right-back, and from that position he contributed two decisive passes in a 3–1 home defeat of Hull City on 8 April 2017. On 25 May, Manchester City announced he would be leaving the club.

=== Return to Sevilla ===
On 1 August 2017, Sevilla announced the return of Navas through a video. He signed a four-year contract and was given the number 16 shirt previously worn by the late Antonio Puerta, who was a close friend.

During his second spell, Navas continued to occasionally appear at right-back. On 20 September 2017, he celebrated his 400th competitive appearance for the club by scoring the only goal of the 1–0 home win over Las Palmas, and he surpassed Pablo Blanco's record of 416 matches when he came off the bench against Levante on 16 December.

Navas was made captain ahead of the 2018–19 season. On 18 October 2018, the board of directors decided to rename the main stadium of the training ground, the Ciudad Deportiva José Ramón Cisneros Palacios, as Estadio Jesús Navas in recognition of his professional career.

On 3 January 2020, Navas became the first player to reach 500 appearances for Sevilla, when he started in a 1–1 draw against Athletic Bilbao. On 21 August, he captained the side to a 3–2 victory over Inter Milan in the Europa League final, his third title in the competition for the club.

Navas agreed to a new three-year deal in June 2021. On 31 May 2023, the 37-year-old started in the Europa League final against José Mourinho's Roma, which ended in a penalty shoot-out victory following a 1–1 draw; he played a pivotal role, as it was his teasing cross in the 55th minute that resulted in Gianluca Mancini's own goal to tie the match. Consequently, he was named Player of the Season by UEFA's technical observer panel.

On 16 May 2024, Navas announced that he would be leaving again on 30 June, later revealing on social media that the club did not attempt to reach out to him regarding a potential contract renewal. Following this revelation, chairman José María del Nido Benavente offered the player a lifetime extension, which he accepted.

Navas scored the only goal in a 1–0 win over Getafe on 14 September 2024, becoming the oldest player to achieve this for Sevilla in La Liga aged 38 years and 298 days, breaking the previous record of Sergio Ramos. On 14 December, he played his final match at the Sánchez Pizjuán, a 1–0 victory against Celta de Vigo; he came off after 70 minutes, to hugs from his teammates and a standing ovation from the crowd. His last overall appearance took place at the Santiago Bernabéu Stadium, a 4–2 loss to Real Madrid where he took the field at the hour mark and was cheered by spectators before and after the game.

== International career ==
After breaking into the Sevilla first team, Navas made his debut for the Spain under-21s, scoring in a 1–1 draw against France on 17 August 2004. He had been remarked as a potential star after good performances for club and country, but his anxiety problems forced him to quit international football. In August 2009, he announced his desire to overcome his condition in order to stake his claim in the squad for the 2010 FIFA World Cup and made himself available for selection, stating: "To play for your country is the greatest thing and I hope to be able to, too. I have to be calm and make my decision. I have to continue taking the right steps."

On 9 November 2009, Navas was called up by coach Vicente del Bosque for friendlies with Argentina and Austria. On 14 November he made his debut against Argentina in a 2–1 win in Madrid, playing the final ten minutes in the place of Andrés Iniesta; four days later, he played the entire second half in a 5–1 win over Austria in Vienna.

Called up for the World Cup in South Africa, Navas scored his first international goal on 3 June 2010 in a warm-up match against South Korea, scoring the game's only goal four minutes from time. He appeared in three matches in the tournament, including the last 30 minutes plus extra time in the final against the Netherlands, when Spain lifted its first World Cup trophy.

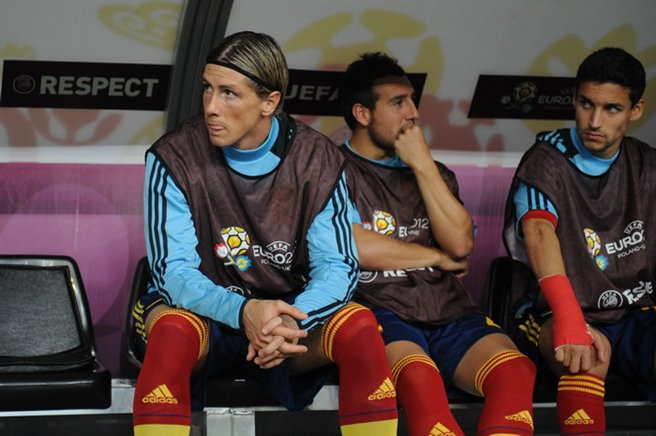
Navas (right) on the bench during Euro 2012

Navas was also selected for UEFA Euro 2012, where he appeared in several games for the eventual champions as a substitute. On 18 June, he scored the game's only goal in the 87th minute of the last group stage fixture against Croatia, handing Spain the first place in Group C: he scored from close range, following an assist by Iniesta.

Picked for the 2013 FIFA Confederations Cup, Navas made three appearances from the bench. On 27 June, in the semi-final against Italy, he scored the decisive penalty in the shootout (0–0 after extra time).

Navas was one of seven players cut from Spain's final squad for the 2014 World Cup, alongside Manchester City teammate Álvaro Negredo. On 15 March 2019, after almost six years of absence from international duty, the 33-year-old returned to the national setup for Euro 2020 qualifying matches against Norway and Malta.

Three years after his last appearance, the 37-year-old Navas was selected for the 2023 UEFA Nations League Finals by new manager Luis de la Fuente. He played the full 90 minutes of a victory over Italy in the semi-finals, and in doing so at the age of 37 years and 206 days became the oldest player to feature for the Spain national team, breaking the previous record set by Luis Suárez in 1971 at 36 years and 346 days. Three days later, he again started at right-back in the final against Croatia, being replaced in the 97th minute of an eventual shootout win; this triumph saw him become the first player in history to win a World Cup, a European Championship and a Nations League title.

On 7 June 2024, Navas was named in the 26-man squad for Euro 2024. Seventeen days later, he captained the side in the group stage 1–0 win over Albania, becoming the oldest Spanish player to feature in a major tournament aged 38 years and 216 days; Spain would go on to win the tournament, beating England 2–1 in the final, after which he immediately announced his international retirement.

== Style of play ==
Navas' main assets were his speed, dribbling skills and ability to run at opposing defenders. Formerly a winger, in his second spell at Sevilla, he was almost exclusively deployed as a right-back, compensating for his physical weaknesses with speed.

== Personal life ==
Navas suffered from chronic homesickness, to the extent he walked out of training camps in Spain because they were too far away from Seville. He also suffered from anxiety attacks and seizures, and initially refused to travel with Sevilla during pre-season to the United States due to his homesickness, later changing his mind in a bid to rid himself of this condition.

Navas' older brother, Marco, was also a footballer and a midfielder. After also graduating from Sevilla's youth academy he made three first-team appearances, and played mainly in the Segunda División. Their family is of Gitano/Romani origin.

Navas' hip problems that forced him to retire affected his capacity of playing most sports. He subsequently took up bicycle touring.

== Career statistics ==
=== Club ===
Appearances and goals by club, season and competition
Club	Season	League			National cup (Note: Includes Copa del Rey, FA Cup)		League cup (Note: Includes Football League/EFL Cup)		Europe		Other		Total	
Club	Season	Division	Apps	Goals	Apps	Goals	Apps	Goals	Apps	Goals	Apps	Goals	Apps	Goals
Sevilla Atlético	2002–03	Segunda División B	6	0	—		—		—		—		6	0
Sevilla Atlético	2003–04	Segunda División B	23	3	—		—		—		6 (Note: Appearances in Segunda División B play-offs)	0	29	3
Sevilla Atlético	2004–05	Segunda División B	4	0	—		—		—		—		4	0
Sevilla Atlético	Total		33	3	—		—		—		6	0	39	3
Sevilla	2003–04	La Liga	5	0	0	0	—		—		—		5	0
Sevilla	2004–05	La Liga	23	2	2	1	—		5 (Note: Appearances in UEFA Europa League)	0	—		30	3
Sevilla	2005–06	La Liga	34	2	2	0	—		12	0	—		48	2
Sevilla	2006–07	La Liga	29	1	5	1	—		7	0	1 (Note: Appearance in UEFA Super Cup)	0	42	2
Sevilla	2007–08	La Liga	36	4	4	0	—		10 (Note: Appearances in UEFA Champions League)	0	3 (Note: Two appearances in Supercopa de España, one appearance in UEFA Super Cup)	0	53	4
Sevilla	2008–09	La Liga	35	4	8	1	—		6	0	—		49	5
Sevilla	2009–10	La Liga	34	4	9	4	—		8	2	—		51	10
Sevilla	2010–11	La Liga	15	1	5	0	—		6 (Note: Two appearances and one goal in UEFA Champions League, four appearances in UEFA Europa League)	1	2 (Note: Appearances in Supercopa de España)	0	28	2
Sevilla	2011–12	La Liga	37	5	4	0	—		2	0	—		43	5
Sevilla	2012–13	La Liga	37	0	7	1	—		—		—		44	1
Sevilla	Total		285	23	46	8	—		56	3	6	0	393	34
Manchester City	2013–14	Premier League	30	4	5	0	5	2	8	0	—		48	6
Manchester City	2014–15	Premier League	35	0	2	0	2	1	7	0	1 (Note: Appearance in FA Community Shield)	0	47	1
Manchester City	2015–16	Premier League	34	0	2	0	6	1	10	0	—		52	1
Manchester City	2016–17	Premier League	24	0	4	0	2	0	6	0	—		36	0
Manchester City	Total		123	4	13	0	15	4	31	0	1	0	183	8
Sevilla	2017–18	La Liga	26	1	8	2	—		10	0	—		44	3
Sevilla	2018–19	La Liga	32	1	1	0	—		10	1	1	0	44	2
Sevilla	2019–20	La Liga	38	0	3	0	—		6	0	—		47	0
Sevilla	2020–21	La Liga	34	0	2	0	—		6	0	1	0	43	0
Sevilla	2021–22	La Liga	25	0	0	0	—		8 (Note: Four appearances in UEFA Champions League, four appearances in UEFA Europa League)	0	—		33	0
Sevilla	2022–23	La Liga	32	0	5	0	—		12 (Note: Three appearances in UEFA Champions League, nine appearances in UEFA Europa League)	0	—		49	0
Sevilla	2023–24	La Liga	29	0	2	0	—		4	0	1	0	36	0
Sevilla	2024–25	La Liga	15	1	1	0	—		—		—		16	1
Sevilla	Total		231	3	22	2	0	0	56	1	3	0	312	6
Career total			672	33	81	10	15	4	143	4	16	0	927	51

=== International ===
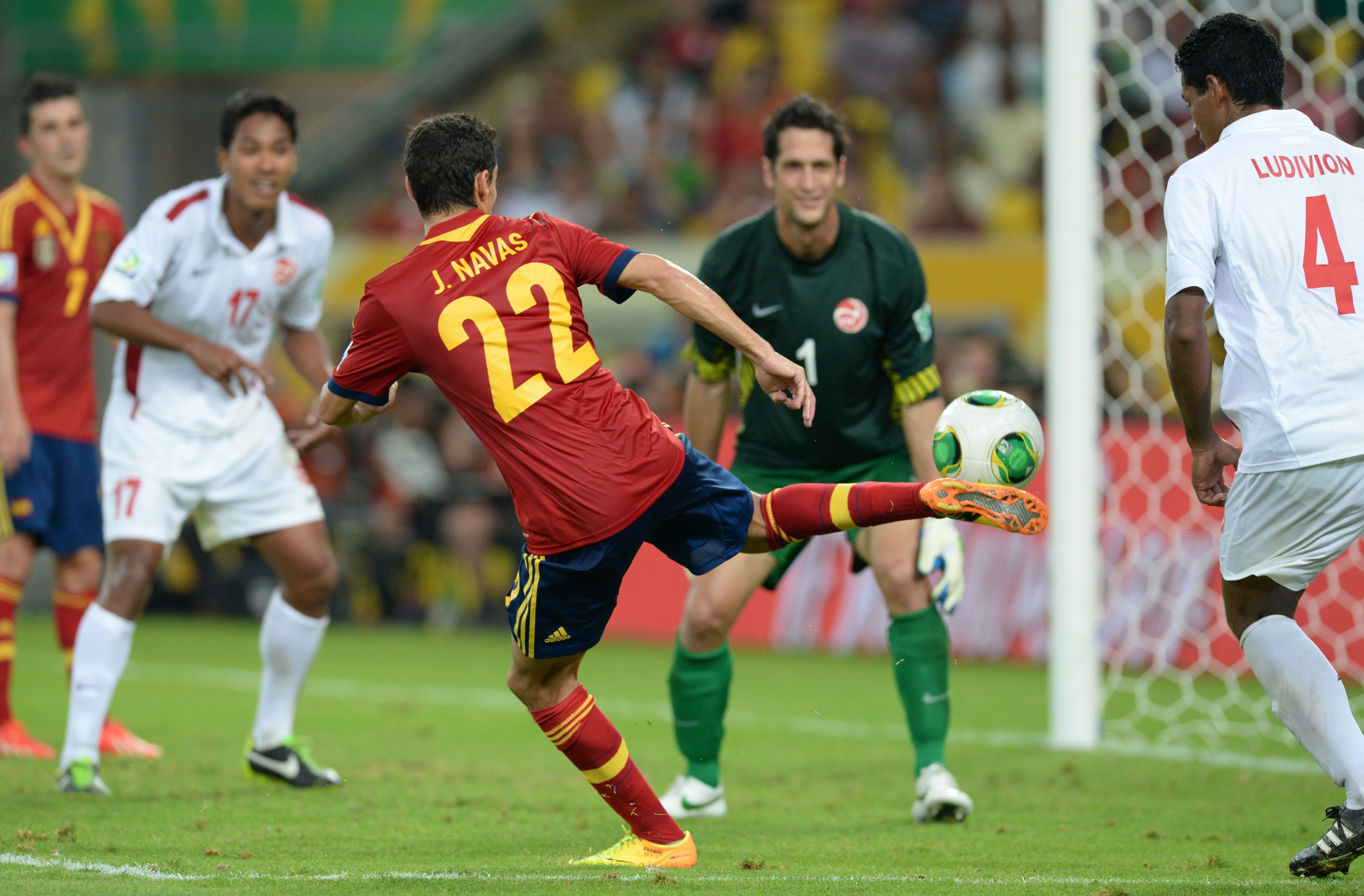
Navas playing for Spain against Tahiti in the 2013 Confederations Cup

Appearances and goals by national team and year
National team	Year	Apps	Goals
Spain	2009	2	0
Spain	2010	9	1
Spain	2011	3	0
Spain	2012	8	1
Spain	2013	12	1
Spain	2014	1	0
Spain	2015	0	0
Spain	2016	0	0
Spain	2017	0	0
Spain	2018	0	0
Spain	2019	7	2
Spain	2020	4	0
Spain	2021	0	0
Spain	2022	0	0
Spain	2023	4	0
Spain	2024	6	0
Total		56	5

Scores and results list Spain's goal tally first, score column indicates score after each Navas goal.

List of international goals scored by Jesús Navas
No.	Date	Venue	Opponent	Score	Result	Competition
1	3 June 2010	Tivoli-Neu, Innsbruck, Austria	South Korea	1–0	1–0	Friendly
2	18 June 2012	PGE Arena, Gdańsk, Poland	Croatia	1–0	1–0	UEFA Euro 2012
3	10 September 2013	Stade de Genève, Geneva, Switzerland	Chile	2–2	2–2	Friendly
4	7 June 2019	Tórsvøllur, Tórshavn, Faroe Islands	Faroe Islands	2–0	4–1	UEFA Euro 2020 qualifying
5	15 November 2019	Ramón de Carranza, Cádiz, Spain	Malta	7–0	7–0	UEFA Euro 2020 qualifying

== Honours ==
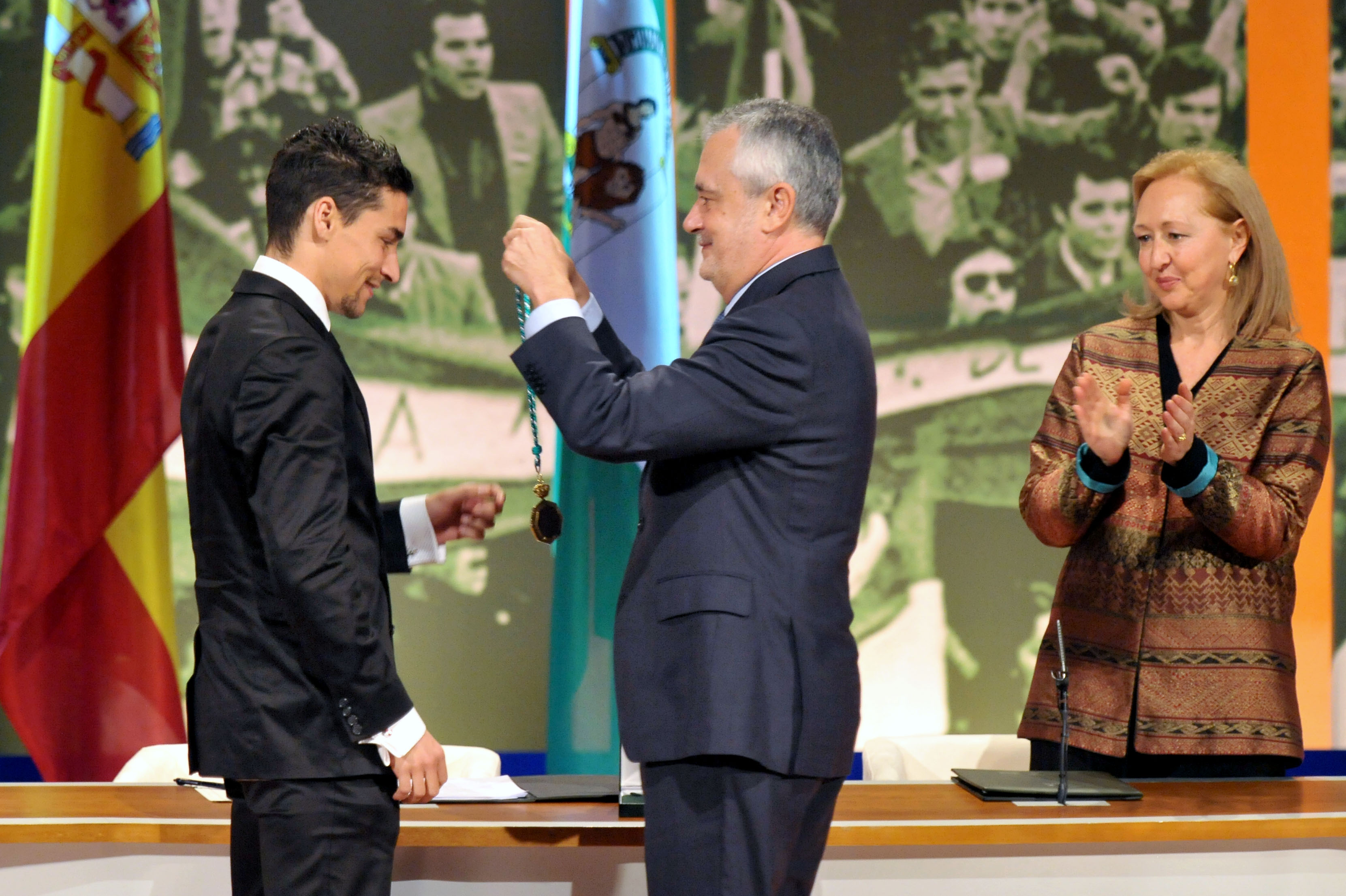
Navas receiving the Medal of Andalusia from regional president José Antonio Griñán in 2011

Sevilla

- Copa del Rey: 2006–07, 2009–10
- Supercopa de España: 2007
- UEFA Cup/UEFA Europa League: 2005–06, 2006–07, 2019–20, 2022–23
- UEFA Super Cup: 2006; runner-up: 2023

Manchester City

- Premier League: 2013–14
- Football League Cup: 2013–14, 2015–16

Spain

- FIFA World Cup: 2010
- UEFA European Championship: 2012, 2024
- UEFA Nations League: 2022–23
- FIFA Confederations Cup runner-up: 2013

Individual

- La Liga Best Attacking Midfielder: 2009–10
- La Liga Team of The Season: 2018–19
- UEFA Europa League Team of the Season: 2019–20, 2022–23
- UEFA Europa League Player of the Season: 2022–23

Orders

- Gold Medal of the Royal Order of Sporting Merit: 2011

== See also ==
- List of footballers with 400 or more La Liga appearances
