= Juande Ramos =

Spanish footballer and manager (born 1954)

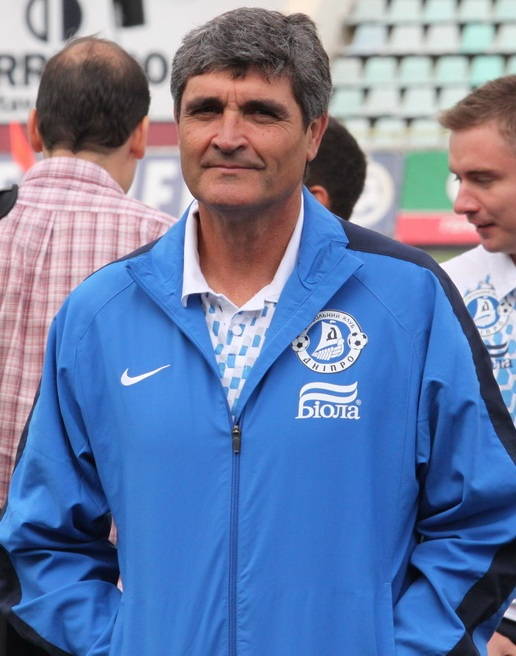
- Ramos with Dnipro Dnipropetrovsk in 2011

Personal information
- Full name: Juan de la Cruz Ramos Cano
- Date of birth: 25 September 1954 (age 72)
- Place of birth: Pedro Muñoz, Spain
- Position: Midfielder

Senior career*
Years	Team	Apps	(Gls)
1973–1977	Elche	3	(0)
1977–1979	Alcoyano	63	(17)
1979–1980	Linares	10	(0)
1980–1981	Eldense	7	(0)
1981–1982	Alicante		
1982	Dénia		
Total		83	(17)

Managerial career
- 1989–1990: Elche (youth)
- 1990–1992: Elche (assistant)
- 1990–1992: Elche B
- 1992–1994: Alcoyano
- 1994–1995: Levante
- 1995–1996: Logroñés
- 1996–1997: Barcelona B
- 1997–1998: Lleida
- 1998–2001: Rayo Vallecano
- 2001–2002: Betis
- 2002: Espanyol
- 2003–2004: Málaga
- 2005–2007: Sevilla
- 2007–2008: Tottenham Hotspur
- 2008–2009: Real Madrid
- 2009: CSKA Moscow
- 2010–2014: Dnipro Dnipropetrovsk
- 2016: Málaga
- * Club domestic league appearances and goals

Juan de la Cruz "Juande" Ramos Cano (born 25 September 1954) is a former Spanish footballer and manager.

After playing and managing at an amateur level, Ramos led Rayo Vallecano to promotion to La Liga, followed by reaching the quarter-finals of the UEFA Cup in 2001. After brief spells in La Liga at Real Betis, Espanyol and Málaga, he took over at Sevilla in 2005. In two years at the club, he won the UEFA Cup on two occasions, as well as the UEFA Super Cup in 2006, and also winning the Copa del Rey and Supercopa de España.

Ramos had a brief spell in England's Premier League, winning the Football League Cup at Tottenham Hotspur in 2008. He then managed Real Madrid, CSKA Moscow, Dnipro and Málaga again.

== Playing career ==
Ramos played for Elche, Alcoyano, Linares, Eldense, Alicante and Dénia as a midfielder, until he retired due to a knee injury at the age of 28.

== Management career ==
=== Early years and Rayo ===
Ramos began his managerial career in 1990 at Elche CF Ilicitano. He went on to manage Alcoyano and Levante in Segunda División B, before joining CD Logroñés in 1995. In his one year in La Rioja, he guided them to promotion from the Segunda División in second place behind Hércules CF. He then moved to FC Barcelona B – where he was relegated from the same division – and then UE Lleida and Rayo Vallecano. In 1999, he won promotion with the team from the outskirts of Madrid with a playoff victory over CF Extremadura, and took 22 points from the first 30 in La Liga, a record for a newly promoted team. They finished 9th, 17 points off winners Deportivo de La Coruña, and qualified for their first European tournament, the UEFA Cup, via the Fair Play rule.

In the 2000–01 UEFA Cup, Ramos' Rayo won 10–0 on their debut in the qualifying round on 20 August, away to Constel·lació Esportiva in Andorra; the final aggregate score was 16–0. They made the quarter-finals before losing 4–2 on aggregate to compatriots Deportivo Alavés.

=== Betis, Espanyol and Málaga ===
In June 2001, Ramos succeeded club icon Luis del Sol at Real Betis. Having come sixth in his one season with the newy promoted Seville-based club, he signed for RCD Espanyol. He was fired on 20 October 2002, having taken one point from five games and been eliminated from the cup by Alicante CF.

Ramos returned to work in June 2003, succeeding Joaquín Peiró for one year at Málaga CF. Due to conflicts with the board, he did not request a new deal after finishing 10th.

=== Sevilla ===
In June 2005, after a year out of work, Ramos signed for Sevilla FC for one season with an automatic second depending on objectives. His first game on 28 August was a 1–0 win over Racing de Santander, the goal being scored by Kepa Blanco. During his first season, he won the UEFA Cup in the final against Middlesbrough, where his side won 4–0, and also winning the UEFA Super Cup, beating European champions and fellow La Liga side FC Barcelona 3–0.

In the 2006–07 season, Ramos won the UEFA Cup for the second consecutive season after a 2–2 draw against RCD Espanyol, which Sevilla won 3–1 on penalties. He also led them to a third-place finish in La Liga, qualifying them for the European Champions League for the 2007–08 season. He also won the Copa del Rey, beating Getafe CF and pipped La Liga title holders Real Madrid to the Supercopa de España.

In the 2006–07 Copa del Rey, Sevilla played city rivals and Ramos' former team Betis in the quarter-finals. After a goalless draw in the first leg at the Ramón Sánchez Pizjuán Stadium, Frédéric Kanouté scored a 55th-minute away goal at Betis in the second leg on 28 February. A Betis fan reacted by throwing a bottle at Ramos's head, knocking him unconscious. The game was abandoned and its remainder was played in March, behind closed doors in Getafe. The fan was fined €2,700 and paid €360 to Ramos, while the next three games at the Estadio Benito Villamarín were ordered to be in an empty stadium.

Ramos claimed he turned down a "dizzying" offer to become Tottenham Hotspur manager in August 2007, but ended speculation on his future at Sevilla, by stating in September that he would stay with the club until the end of the season. However, following Tottenham manager Martin Jol's sacking on 25 October, he was again tipped to become his replacement. Ramos resigned on 26 October and became Tottenham manager the following day on a four-year deal, which was reportedly worth £6 million a year.

=== Tottenham Hotspur ===
Ramos inherited a Tottenham side falling well short of expectations as their poor defending meant they were in the relegation zone when he arrived. His first game in charge was a 2–0 win against Blackpool in the League Cup at White Hart Lane on 31 October, courtesy of goals from Robbie Keane and Pascal Chimbonda. Three days later, his team drew 1–1 at Middlesbrough on his league debut.

On 18 December 2007, Spurs travelled to the City of Manchester Stadium for their League Cup quarter-final against a Manchester City who up until that point had won every home game of the season, but despite playing with 10 men for more than 70 minutes, Ramos still masterminded a 2–0 victory for Tottenham. This set up a semi-final with North London rivals Arsenal. The first leg at the Emirates Stadium ended with a 1–1 draw, but the return leg at White Hart Lane saw Tottenham win 5–1. It was Tottenham's first win in the North London derby since 1999, and the biggest win for either side in the derby since 1983. It also meant Tottenham made their first appearance at the newly rebuilt Wembley Stadium against Chelsea in their first cup final since 2002. Spurs started the game at a high tempo, but fell behind to a free-kick from Didier Drogba. However a second half penalty from Dimitar Berbatov took the game to extra time, where Jonathan Woodgate scored the winner to give Spurs both their first trophy since 1999 and qualification for the 2008–09 UEFA Cup.

After spending over £60 million in the summer on Luka Modrić, David Bentley, Roman Pavlyuchenko and Heurelho Gomes, the 2008–09 season saw Ramos lead Tottenham to their worst ever start to a league campaign, with the team placed bottom of the table after acquiring just two points from their opening eight matches; they had won only three league games since the League Cup win in February. This eventually led to Ramos being sacked on 25 October, along with assistant manager Gus Poyet, first team coach Marcos Álvarez, and club sporting director Damien Comolli, less than 24 hours before the club's next league game with Bolton Wanderers. Harry Redknapp was announced as Ramos's immediate replacement. Tottenham went on to defeat Bolton 2–0 and register their first league win of the season.

During his time at Tottenham, Ramos put his players on strict diets, eliminating sugar, swapping juice for water and serving meat with no sauce. He said that his team were a collective 100 kg overweight on his arrival, which had halved by February. His doctor, Antonio Escribano, likened the players to Formula One cars that could only perform on the right fuel. Striker Darren Bent later said that the team began to turn on the manager due to their drab diet, including captain Ledley King.

=== Real Madrid ===
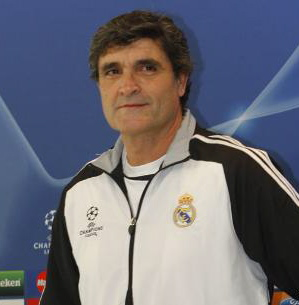
Ramos as manager of Real Madrid

On 9 December 2008, Ramos became manager of Real Madrid. He replaced Bernd Schuster, who left by mutual accord. He took over immediately before their UEFA Champions League match against Zenit St. Petersburg and the El Clásico match against FC Barcelona. He managed to bring the team back to the race for the title after achieving 52 points out of 54 possible in 18 consecutive games. However, after losing to Barcelona 2–6 at the Santiago Bernabéu Stadium, Madrid were defeated in 4 consecutive matches, ending 9 points behind their rivals. His contract ended at the conclusion of the 2008–09 La Liga, and he was replaced by Manuel Pellegrini in June.

=== CSKA Moscow ===
On 10 September 2009, Ramos signed for CSKA Moscow until December 2009, replacing Brazilian manager Zico, who left for Olympiacos. Ramos said of the appointment: "I have come here to help the team in the Champions League. Our target is to advance from the group stage".

On 26 October 2009, after just 47 days in charge, Ramos was relieved of his position by mutual consent after a 3–1 defeat at the Luzhniki Stadium by Russian Premier League rivals FC Moscow a day earlier. The sacking came one year after his departure from White Hart Lane. Krylya Sovetov coach Leonid Slutsky was appointed as Ramos' replacement.

=== Dnipro Dnipropetrovsk ===
On 1 October 2010, Ramos became the manager of Dnipro Dnipropetrovsk, having signed a contract for four years. He left the club after the 2013–14 Ukrainian Premier League season, reportedly because of "the reluctance of his family to stay in Ukraine for a long time".

It was later revealed Ramos left the Ukrainian club due to not receiving his wages under contract. Ramos eventually won a court hearing against Dnipro, for which the club was banned from the 2015–16 UEFA Europa League competition and was deducted 6 points in the domestic league (2016–17 Ukrainian Premier League).

=== Return to Málaga ===
On 27 May 2016, Ramos returned as the manager of Málaga for the second time on his career, signing a three-year contract. Both the club and the coach agreed to part ways on 27 December.

== Managerial statistics ==
As of 29 December 2016

Team	Nat	From	To	Record				
Team	Nat	From	To	P	W	D	L	Win %
Elche B	(Spain)	1 July 1990	27 May 1992	68	28	20	20	41.18
Alcoyano	(Spain)	27 May 1992	14 June 1994	86	28	29	29	32.56
Levante	(Spain)	14 June 1994	26 June 1995	46	24	14	8	52.17
Logroñés	(Spain)	27 June 1995	21 May 1996	42	21	10	11	50.00
Barcelona B	(Spain)	21 May 1996	16 June 1997	38	7	13	18	18.42
Lleida	(Spain)	16 June 1997	18 May 1998	46	20	10	16	43.48
Rayo Vallecano	(Spain)	19 May 1998	17 June 2001	146	59	43	44	40.41
Real Betis	(Spain)	19 June 2001	18 May 2002	39	15	14	10	38.46
Espanyol	(Spain)	19 May 2002	7 October 2002	6	0	1	5	0.00
Málaga	(Spain)	23 June 2003	12 June 2004	42	17	7	18	40.48
Sevilla	(Spain)	3 June 2005	26 October 2007	133	76	27	30	57.14
Tottenham Hotspur	(England)	27 October 2007	25 October 2008	54	21	16	17	38.89
Real Madrid	(Spain)	9 December 2008	1 June 2009	27	18	1	8	66.67
CSKA Moscow	(Russia)	10 September 2009	26 October 2009	9	4	1	4	44.44
Dnipro Dnipropetrovsk	(Ukraine)	3 October 2010	21 May 2014	139	79	29	31	56.83
Málaga	(Spain)	27 May 2016	27 December 2016	18	5	6	7	27.78
Total				940	422	240	278	44.89

== Honours ==
=== Manager ===
==== Club ====
Sevilla

- Copa del Rey: 2006–07
- Supercopa de España: 2007
- UEFA Cup: 2005–06, 2006–07
- UEFA Super Cup: 2006

Tottenham Hotspur

- Football League Cup: 2007–08

==== Individual ====
- Miguel Muñoz Trophy: 2006–07

== See also ==
- List of UEFA Cup and Europa League winning managers
