= Pablo Vargas =

Spanish footballer

Personal information
- Full name: Pablo Alberto Vargas Pérez
- Date of birth: 16 February 1984 (age 42)
- Place of birth: Aznalcázar, Spain
- Height: 1.90 m (6 ft 3 in)
- Position: Goalkeeper

Youth career
- Betis

Senior career*
Years	Team	Apps	(Gls)
2003–2005	Betis B	46	(0)
2005–2009	Sevilla B	59	(0)
2009–2010	Cacereño	37	(0)
2010–2011	Universidad LP	35	(0)
2011–2012	Lucena	24	(0)
2012–2016	Cacereño	95	(0)
2016	Benacazón	5	(0)
2017	Pilas	10	(0)
- * Club domestic league appearances and goals

Pablo Alberto Vargas Pérez (born 16 February 1984) is a Spanish former footballer who played as a goalkeeper.

== Club career ==
Born in Aznalcázar, Province of Seville, Vargas finished his development at local Real Betis, and made his senior debut with the B-side in the 2003–04 season, in the Segunda División B. In summer 2005 he joined another reserve team, signing with fierce rivals Sevilla Atlético.

Vargas made his professional debut on 22 September 2007, starting in a 2–2 home draw against CD Castellón in the Segunda División. He also managed to collect the odd bench appearance with the first team, in La Liga.

In late July 2009, Vargas moved to third level club CP Cacereño. He continued to compete in that tier in the following six years, representing Universidad de Las Palmas CF, Lucena CF and again Cacereño.
