= Duda (footballer, born 1980) =

Portuguese footballer

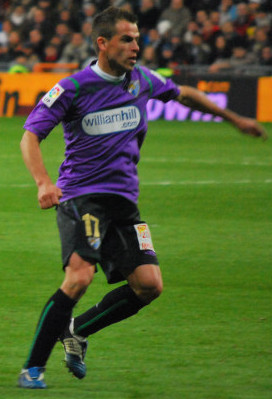
- Duda with Málaga in 2010

Personal information
- Full name: Sérgio Paulo Barbosa Valente
- Date of birth: 27 June 1980 (age 46)
- Place of birth: Porto, Portugal
- Height: 1.75 m (5 ft 9 in)
- Position: Winger

Youth career
- 1990–1991: Bairro do Falcão
- 1991–1992: Boavista
- 1992–1995: Bairro do Falcão
- 1995–1996: CD Portugal
- 1996–1999: Vitória Guimarães

Senior career*
Years	Team	Apps	(Gls)
1999–2001	Cádiz	44	(15)
2001–2006	Málaga	93	(13)
2002–2003	→ Levante (loan)	19	(2)
2006–2009	Sevilla	28	(0)
2008–2009	→ Málaga (loan)	35	(5)
2009–2017	Málaga	187	(17)
Total		406	(52)

International career
2001	Portugal U21	3	(1)
2007–2010	Portugal	18	(1)
- * Club domestic league appearances and goals

Sérgio Paulo Barbosa Valente (born 27 June 1980), known as Duda (Portuguese pronunciation: [ˈduðɐ]), is a Portuguese former professional footballer who played as a left winger.

He was mostly known for his set pieces and crossing ability, and spent his entire career in Spain, making more than 300 official appearances for four clubs. He represented mainly Málaga and Sevilla, amassing La Liga totals of 343 matches and 35 goals.

The recipient of 18 caps, Duda appeared for Portugal at the 2010 World Cup.

== Club career ==
Having grown through the ranks of Vitória de Guimarães, Porto-born Duda had not yet played one single competitive senior game when he was sold to Cádiz CF in the Spanish Segunda División B. For the 2001–02 season he switched to La Liga with Málaga CF and, after a loan move to Segunda División with Levante UD, was everpresent in a team that achieved two consecutive 10th-place finishes, also appearing in the UEFA Cup via the Intertoto.

In 2005–06, involved in a contract dispute, Duda featured scarcely as Málaga were relegated and, during the summer, he joined Andalusia neighbours Sevilla FC. Incidentally, his arrival coincided with the emergence of another left-footed player, Antonio Puerta (whom played as either left-back or midfielder); after Puerta's sudden death the following campaign he also played backup, to Diego Capel.

With Capel firmly established as first-choice, Duda was loaned for 2008–09 to an old acquaintance, Málaga, in August 2008. During the season, he was an instrumental attacking element as the side narrowly missed on Europa League qualification, with compatriot Eliseu often playing in the other wing.

In late August 2009, after intense negotiations, Duda moved permanently to Málaga on a four-year contract, with Sevilla benefitting from a percentage of any future sale. In the first season of his second spell he was heavily played as they narrowly avoided relegation, leading the team in goals; May 2010 was a particular active period for him as he netted in 1–1 draws, at Athletic Bilbao from a direct corner kick and in the season's closer at home against Real Madrid, in which he was also sent off after elbowing Xabi Alonso.

After suffering an injury during the 2010 World Cup, Duda underwent surgery to fix his pubalgia ailment and missed the beginning of the new season. In his return to action, on 21 November 2010, he played the first 60 minutes of a 3–0 away defeat against Deportivo de La Coruña. On 29 January 2011, he celebrated his 200th Spanish top flight match by scoring against Real Zaragoza, but in a 1–2 home defeat.

In 2011–12, following the summer signings of Santi Cazorla and Joaquín and the ostracism to which Manuel Pellegrini voted Apoño after the first matchday, Duda was often used as a central midfielder. His first goal of the campaign came on 22 March 2012 – with his first touch – from a long-range shot in an eventual 4–2 home win over Rayo Vallecano.

Duda made his 200th league appearance for Málaga on 31 March 2012, in a 0–2 home defeat against Real Betis. He started the following season as an habitual substitute but, on 4 December, in a rare start, at home to R.S.C. Anderlecht in the group stage of the UEFA Champions League, he scored both of his team's goals in a 2–2 draw.

On 1 July 2013, the 33-year-old Duda signed a two-year extension to his contract with the option of a third, running until 2015. On 1 February of the following year he scored his first goals of the new campaign, netting a brace to help defeat his former club Sevilla 3–2 at La Rosaleda Stadium.

Duda announced he was leaving Málaga in May 2017. He made 349 competitive appearances during his spell, 315 in the Spanish top flight alone. Shortly after, he returned to the club as director of its youth academy.

== International career ==
Duda made his debut with Portugal in 2007 at the age of already 27, as the winger position in the national side was packed with talent (Nani, Ricardo Quaresma, Cristiano Ronaldo, Simão Sabrosa). On 20 August 2008, in a 5–0 friendly win over Faroe Islands, he scored his first goal after coming on as a second-half replacement.

During the 2010 FIFA World Cup qualifiers, Duda was often used as an emergency left-back by national coach Carlos Queiroz. He was included in the squad-of-23 for the final stages in South Africa, where he appeared twice in the group stage: playing 20 minutes against North Korea, he assisted Liédson who took the score to 5–0 in an eventual 7–0 rout. He then started against Brazil, in a 0–0 draw.

== Career statistics ==
=== Club ===
Club	Season	League			Cup		Europe		Other		Total	
Club	Season	Division	Apps	Goals	Apps	Goals	Apps	Goals	Apps	Goals	Apps	Goals
Cádiz	1999–00	Segunda División B	8	0	0	0	—				8	0
Cádiz	2000–01	Segunda División B	36	15	0	0	—				36	15
Cádiz	Total		44	15	0	0	—				44	15
Málaga	2001–02	La Liga	9	1	2	0	—				11	1
Málaga	2002–03	La Liga	0	0	0	0	2	0	—		2	0
Málaga	2003–04	La Liga	35	4	2	0	—				37	4
Málaga	2004–05	La Liga	35	4	2	0	—				37	4
Málaga	2005–06	La Liga	14	4	0	0	—				14	4
Málaga	Total		93	13	6	0	—				101	13
Levante (loan)	2002–03	Segunda División	19	2	0	0	—				19	2
Levante (loan)	Total		19	2	0	0	—				19	2
Sevilla	2006–07	La Liga	11	0	6	2	7	1	—		24	3
Sevilla	2007–08	La Liga	17	0	1	0	3	0	3	0	24	0
Sevilla	Total		28	0	7	2	10	1	3	0	48	3
Málaga	2008–09	La Liga	35	5	1	0	—				36	5
Málaga	2009–10	La Liga	34	8	2	0	—				36	8
Málaga	2010–11	La Liga	20	3	2	0	—				22	3
Málaga	2011–12	La Liga	25	1	1	0	—				26	1
Málaga	2012–13	La Liga	17	0	6	1	9	2	—		32	3
Málaga	2013–14	La Liga	24	2	2	0	—				26	2
Málaga	2014–15	La Liga	25	1	1	0	—				26	1
Málaga	2015–16	La Liga	26	1	0	0	—				26	1
Málaga	2016–17	La Liga	16	1	2	0	—				18	1
Málaga	Total		222	22	17	1	11	2	—		248	25
Career total			406	52	30	3	21	3	3	0	460	58

=== International goals ===
List of international goals scored by Duda
No.	Date	Venue	Cap	Opponent	Score	Result	Competition	Ref.
1	20 August 2008	Estádio Municipal de Aveiro, Aveiro, Portugal		Faroe Islands	3–0	5–0	Friendly	

== Honours ==
Málaga

- UEFA Intertoto Cup: 2002

Sevilla

- Copa del Rey: 2006–07
- Supercopa de España: 2007
- UEFA Cup: 2006–07

Portugal U18

- UEFA European Under-18 Championship: 1999
