= 2006–07 RCD Espanyol season =

RCD Espanyol
2006–07 season
- President: Daniel Sánchez Llibre
- Head coach: Ernesto Valverde
- Stadium: Estadi Olímpic Lluís Companys
- La Liga: 11th
- Copa del Rey: Round of 16
- Supercopa de España: Runners-up
- UEFA Cup: Runners-up
- Top goalscorer: League: Raúl Tamudo (15); All: Walter Pandiani (18)

The 2006–07 RCD Espanyol season was the club's 13th consecutive season in the top division of the Spanish football league, La Liga, and the 107th in the club's history.

== Competitions ==
=== Overall record ===
Competition	First match	Last match	Starting round	Final position	Record							
Competition	First match	Last match	Starting round	Final position	Pld	W	D	L	GF	GA	GD	Win %
La Liga	27 August 2006	17 June 2007	Matchday 1	12th	38	12	13	13	46	53	−7	31.58
Copa del Rey	25 October 2006	8 November 2006	Round of 32	Round of 32	2	0	1	1	1	2	−1	0.00
Supercopa de España	17 August 2006	20 August 2006	Final	Runners-up	2	0	0	2	0	4	−4	0.00
UEFA Cup	14 September 2006	16 May 2007	First round	Runners-up	15	11	4	0	34	11	+23	73.33
Total					57	23	18	16	81	70	+11	40.35

=== La Liga ===
==== League table ====
Pos	Team	Pld	W	D	L	GF	GA	GD	Pts	Qualification or relegation
9	Getafe	38	14	10	14	39	33	+6	52	Qualification for the UEFA Cup first round (Note: Since Sevilla, winners of 2006–07 Copa del Rey, was qualified for the 2007–08 UEFA Champions League, so losing cup finalists Getafe earned a spot in the first round of the 2007–08 UEFA Cup.)
10	Racing	38	12	14	12	42	48	−6	50	
11	Espanyol	38	12	13	13	46	53	−7	49 (Note: MLL 1–0 ESP; ESP 3–1 MLL)	
12	Mallorca	38	14	7	17	41	47	−6	49	
13	RC Deportivo	38	12	11	15	32	45	−13	47	

Source: LFP
Rules for classification: 1st points; 2nd head-to-head points; 3rd head-to-head goal difference; 4th head-to-head goals scored; 5th goal difference; 6th number of goals scored; 7th Fair-play points

==== Results summary ====
Overall								Home						Away					
Pld	W	D	L	GF	GA	GD	Pts	W	D	L	GF	GA	GD	W	D	L	GF	GA	GD
38	12	13	13	46	53	−7	49	7	6	6	26	27	−1	5	7	7	20	26	−6

==== Matches ====
Date	Venue	Opponent	Score
27 August	H	Gimnàstic de Tarragona	0–1
10 September	A	Real Zaragoza	0–3
17 September	H	Celta de Vigo	2–1
24 September	A	Mallorca	0–1
1 October	H	Osasuna	0–0
15 October	A	Villarreal	0–0
22 October	H	Racing de Santander	2–2
29 October	A	Levante	0–0
5 November	H	Valencia	1–1
12 November	A	Real Sociedad	1–1
19 November	H	Athletic Bilbao	3–2
26 November	A	Real Betis	1–1
3 December	H	Sevilla	2–1
10 December	A	Atlético Madrid	2–1
17 December	H	Real Madrid	0–1
20 December	A	Getafe	1–0
7 January	H	Recreativo de Huelva	0–1
13 January	H	Barcelona	3–1
21 January	A	Deportivo de La Coruña	0–0

Date	Venue	Opponent	Score
28 January	A	Gimnàstic de Tarragona	0–4
3 February	H	Real Zaragoza	1–2
11 February	A	Celta de Vigo	2–0
18 February	H	Mallorca	3–1
25 February	A	Osasuna	2–0
4 March	H	Villarreal	1–1
11 March	A	Racing de Santander	1–1
18 March	H	Levante	1–1
31 March	A	Valencia	2–3
8 April	H	Real Sociedad	1–0
15 April	A	Athletic Bilbao	1–2
22 April	H	Real Betis	2–2
29 April	A	Sevilla	1–3
6 May	H	Atlético Madrid	2–1
12 May	A	Real Madrid	3–4
20 May	H	Getafe	1–5
27 May	A	Recreativo de Huelva	1–0
9 June	A	Barcelona	2–2
17 June	H	Deportivo de La Coruña	1–3

=== Copa del Rey ===
Round	Opponent	Aggregate	First leg			Second leg		
Round	Opponent	Aggregate	Date	Venue	Score	Date	Venue	Score
Round of 32	Rayo Vallecano	1–2	25 October	A	1–1	8 November	H	0–1

=== Supercopa de España ===
17 August 2006 First leg	Espanyol	0–1	Barcelona	Barcelona
21:00		Report	Giuly 43'	Stadium: Estadi Olímpic Lluís Companys; Attendance: 22,560; Referee: Bernardino González Vázquez

20 August 2006 Second leg	Barcelona	3–0	Espanyol	Barcelona
21:00	Xavi 2'; Deco 12', 62'	Report		Stadium: Camp Nou; Attendance: 57,512; Referee: Manuel Mejuto González

Barcelona won 4–0 on aggregate.

=== UEFA Cup ===
==== First round ====
14 September 2006 First leg	Artmedia Petržalka (Slovakia)	2–2	(Spain) Espanyol	Bratislava
18:45 (CET)	Halenár 36'; Tchuř 41'	Report	Riera 31'; Pandiani 53'	Stadium: Tehelné pole Attendance: 3,480; Referee: Nikolai Ivanov (Russia)

28 September 2006 Second leg	Espanyol (Spain)	3–1	(Slovakia) Artmedia Petržalka	Barcelona
21:30 (CET)	Pandiani 19', 79'; L. García 67'	Report	Buryán 13'	Stadium: Estadi Olímpic Lluís Companys; Attendance: 8,100; Referee: Costas Kapitanis (Cyprus)

Espanyol won 5–3 on aggregate.

==== Group stage ====
Pos	Team	Pld	W	D	L	GF	GA	GD	Pts	Qualification	ESP	AJX	ZWA	PRA	AUS
1	(Spain) Espanyol	4	4	0	0	11	2	+9	12	Advance to knockout stage	—	—	6–2	—	1–0
2	(Netherlands) Ajax	4	2	1	1	6	2	+4	7	Advance to knockout stage	0–2	—	—	—	3–0
3	(Belgium) Zulte Waregem	4	2	0	2	9	11	−2	6	Advance to knockout stage	—	0–3	—	3–1	—
4	(Czech Republic) Sparta Prague	4	1	1	2	2	5	−3	4		0–2	0–0	—	—	—
5	Austria Wien	4	0	0	4	1	9	−8	0		—	—	1–4	0–1	—

19 October 2006 1	Sparta Prague (Czech Republic)	0–2	(Spain) Espanyol	Prague
20:15		Report	L. García 17' (pen.); Riera 85'	Stadium: Generali Arena; Attendance: 11,020; Referee: Howard Webb (England)

23 November 2006 2	Espanyol (Spain)	6–2	(Belgium) Zulte Waregem	Barcelona
21:30	Coro 9'; Pandiani 14', 83'; L. García 19', 27' (pen.), 73'	Report	Matthys 17'; D'Haene 62'	Stadium: Estadi Olímpic Lluís Companys; Attendance: 9,250; Referee: Cristian Balaj (Romania)

30 November 2006 3	Ajax (Netherlands)	0–2	(Spain) Espanyol	Amsterdam
20:45		Report	Pandiani 36'; Coro 78'	Stadium: Amsterdam Arena; Attendance: 41,248; Referee: Paolo Bertini (Italy)

13 December 2006 4	Espanyol (Spain)	1–0	Austria Wien	Barcelona
20:45	Pandiani 57'	Report		Stadium: Estadi Olímpic Lluís Companys; Attendance: 5,575; Referee: Krzysztof Slupik (Poland)

==== Knockout stage ====
14 February 2007 Round of 32; First leg	Livorno (Italy)	1–2	(Spain) Espanyol	Livorno
20:45	Galante 82'	Report	Pandiani 28' (pen.); Moha 59'	Stadium: Stadio Armando Picchi; Attendance: 400 (behind closed doors); Referee: Stéphane Lannoy (France)

22 February 2007 Round of 32; Second leg	Espanyol (Spain)	2–0	(Italy) Livorno	Barcelona
21:30	Lacruz 15'; Coro 49'	Report		Stadium: Estadi Olímpic Lluís Companys; Attendance: 12,134; Referee: Paul Allaerts (Belgium)

Espanyol won 4–1 on aggregate.

8 March 2007 Round of 16; First leg	Maccabi Haifa (Israel)	0–0	(Spain) Espanyol	Tel Aviv
18:45		Report		Stadium: Bloomfield Stadium; Attendance: 14,750; Referee: Ivan Bebek (Croatia)

15 March 2007 Round of 16; Second leg	Espanyol (Spain)	4–0	(Israel) Maccabi Haifa	Barcelona
21:30	de la Peña 53'; Tamudo 59'; L. García 61'; Pandiani 90'	Report		Stadium: Estadi Olímpic Lluís Companys; Attendance: 16,150; Referee: Peter Fröjdfeldt (Sweden)

Espanyol won 4–0 on aggregate.

5 April 2007 Quarter-finals; First leg	Espanyol (Spain)	3–2	(Portugal) Benfica	Barcelona
20:45	Tamudo 15'; Riera 33'; Pandiani 59'	Report	Nuno Gomes 64'; Simão 66'	Stadium: Estadi Olímpic Lluís Companys; Attendance: 25,100; Referee: Eric Braamhaar (Netherlands)

12 April 2007 Quarter-finals; Second leg	Benfica (Portugal)	0–0	(Spain) Espanyol	Lisbon
20:45		Report		Stadium: Estádio da Luz; Attendance: 51,102; Referee: Claus Bo Larsen (Denmark)

Espanyol won 3–2 on aggregate.

26 April 2007 Semi-finals; First leg	Espanyol (Spain)	3–0	(Germany) Werder Bremen	Barcelona
20:45	Hurtado 21'; Pandiani 50'; Coro 88'	Report		Stadium: Estadi Olímpic Lluís Companys; Attendance: 40,250; Referee: Tom Henning Øvrebø (Norway)

3 May 2007 Semi-finals; Second leg	Werder Bremen (Germany)	1–2	(Spain) Espanyol	Bremen
20:45	Almeida 4'	Report	Coro 50'; Lacruz 61'	Stadium: Weserstadion; Attendance: 37,000; Referee: Bertrand Layec (France)

Espanyol won 5–1 on aggregate.

==== Final ====
16 May 2007 Final	Espanyol (Spain)	2–2 (a.e.t.) (1–3 p)	(Spain) Sevilla	Glasgow
19:45 (BST)	Riera 28'; Jônatas 115'	Report	Adriano 18'; Kanouté 105'	Stadium: Hampden Park; Attendance: 47,602; Referee: Massimo Busacca (Switzerland)
	Penalties
	L. García (penalty missed); Pandiani (penalty scored); Jônatas (penalty missed); Torrejón (penalty missed)		(penalty scored) Kanouté; (penalty scored) Dragutinović; (penalty missed) Dani Alves; (penalty scored) Puerta

== Squad statistics ==
Last updated on 21 January 2024.

No.	Pos	Nat	Player	Total		La Liga		Copa del Rey		Supercopa		UEFA Cup	
No.	Pos	Nat	Player	Apps	Goals	Apps	Goals	Apps	Goals	Apps	Goals	Apps	Goals
1	GK	(Spain) ESP	Gorka Iraizoz	20	0	2	0	2	0	1	0	15	0
2	DF	(Spain) ESP	Javi Chica	37	0	26	0	0+1	0	0	0	8+2	0
3	DF	(Spain) ESP	David García	18	0	8+2	0	0	0	1	0	7	0
4	DF	(Spain) ESP	Jesús María Lacruz	35	2	20	0	2	0	2	0	8+3	2
6	MF	(Brazil) BRA	Eduardo Costa	25	1	8+8	1	0	0	2	0	4+3	0
7	FW	(Uruguay) URU	Walter Pandiani	52	18	10+24	7	2	0	1+1	0	12+2	11
8	MF	(Argentina) ARG	Pablo Zabaleta	32	0	17+3	0	1	0	2	0	8+1	0
9	MF	(Spain) ESP	Iván de la Peña	38	1	22+4	0	0+1	0	1	0	9+1	1
10	MF	(Spain) ESP	Luis García	53	17	29+7	10	1+1	1	1+1	0	11+2	6
11	MF	(Spain) ESP	Albert Riera	44	7	23+5	4	1	0	0+2	0	9+4	3
12	DF	(Spain) ESP	Juan Velasco	25	0	16+4	0	1	0	0	0	4	0
13	GK	(Cameroon) CMR	Carlos Kameni	37	0	36	0	0	0	1	0	0	0
14	MF	(Spain) ESP	Ito	19	0	3+5	0	1	0	0	0	5+5	0
16	MF	(Brazil) BRA	Jônatas	26	3	16+4	2	1	0	0	0	0+5	1
17	MF	(Morocco) MAR	Moha El Yaagoubi	30	2	13+6	1	2	0	1	0	5+3	1
18	MF	(Spain) ESP	Francisco Rufete	42	1	27+2	1	0	0	2	0	8+3	0
19	DF	(Spain) ESP	Marc Torrejón	41	0	26+3	0	1	0	0+1	0	10	0
20	FW	(Spain) ESP	Coro	45	9	17+13	4	2	0	1+1	0	7+4	5
21	DF	(Spain) ESP	Daniel Jarque	53	0	33+3	0	1	0	2	0	14	0
22	MF	(Spain) ESP	Moisés Hurtado	42	2	28+1	1	1+1	0	0	0	10+1	1
23	FW	(Spain) ESP	Raúl Tamudo	39	17	28+3	15	0	0	1	0	6+1	2
26	GK	(Spain) ESP	Biel Ribas	0	0	0	0	0	0	0	0	0	0
27	MF	(Spain) ESP	Julián López	10	0	1+6	0	0	0	0	0	0+3	0
31	MF	(Spain) ESP	Ángel	9	0	4+3	0	0	0	0	0	0+2	0
32	DF	(Spain) ESP	Albert Serrán	1	0	1	0	0	0	0	0	0	0
33	MF	(Spain) ESP	Miguel Palanca	1	0	0+1	0	0	0	0	0	0	0
	MF	(Spain) ESP	Héctor Simón	0	0	0	0	0	0	0	0	0	0
Players who have left the club after the start of the season:
	DF	(Mozambique) MOZ	Armando Sá	0	0	0	0	0	0	0	0	0	0
	DF	(Spain) ESP	Sergio Sánchez	8	0	2+1	0	1	0	1	0	3	0
	MF	(Brazil) BRA	Fredson	8	0	2	0	2	0	2	0	2	0
	MF	(Spain) ESP	Miki	0	0	0	0	0	0	0	0	0	0
	FW	(Spain) ESP	Jonathan Soriano	2	0	0+1	0	0+1	0	0	0	0	0
