= 2006–07 Tottenham Hotspur F.C. season =

English football club season

Tottenham Hotspur F.C.
2006–07 season
- Chairman: Daniel Levy
- Manager: Martin Jol
- FA Premier League: 5th
- FA Cup: Quarter-finals
- League Cup: Semi-finals
- UEFA Cup: Quarter-finals
- Top goalscorer: League: Dimitar Berbatov (12); All: Dimitar Berbatov (23)
- Highest home attendance: 36,162 (vs. West Ham United, 22 October)
- Lowest home attendance: 34,154 (vs. Middlesbrough, 5 December)
Home colours	Away colours	Third colours

The 2006–07 season was Tottenham Hotspur's 15th season in the Premier League and 29th successive season in the top division of the English football league system. The club also participated in the FA Cup, the Football League Cup, and the UEFA Cup.

== Season summary ==
Expectations were high at the beginning of the season, after only a bout of food poisoning amongst the squad prevented Spurs from pipping arch-rivals Arsenal to fourth place in the Premiership and UEFA Champions League qualification at the end of the previous season. However, the season was marred by injuries, particularly in defense, with Ledley King, Paul Stalteri, Benoît Assou-Ekotto, Lee Young-pyo, Anthony Gardner, Jermaine Jenas, Steed Malbranque and Teemu Tainio all suffering long-term injuries, while Didier Zokora, Dimitar Berbatov, Robbie Keane and Aaron Lennon all suffered short-term injuries during the season, causing Martin Jol to rarely have a settled first XI to pick for extended periods.

Tottenham's Premiership form in the first half of the season was erratic, although there was a famous home win over reigning champions Chelsea in November amongst the mire of mediocre results. Away form was poor during the first half of the season, but a vast improvement in the second half saw just two away losses from January to the end of the season, including one (narrow) defeat in their final six away games, against Chelsea, just 36 hours after playing a UEFA Cup tie in Spain. The improvement in Spurs' away form, good home performances and an excellent end to the season lifted Spurs into fifth position in the final table and UEFA Cup qualification for the second year running. Tottenham played attractive and effective football as Martin Jol made his mark on the squad, reaching the FA Cup quarter-final before losing 1–2 to Chelsea, having drawn 3–3 away, and the League Cup semi-finals, where they were knocked out by Arsenal after drawing 2–2 at home and losing 3–1 away in extra time. In the UEFA Cup Tottenham progressed to the quarter-finals, where they faced holders and eventual winners Sevilla in the quarter-finals, but were eliminated from the competition 4–3 on aggregate.

On 17 March 2007, Paul Robinson became only the third goalkeeper in Premiership history to score a goal, following his 80-yard lob in the 3–1 victory over Watford.

The highly effective Dimitar Berbatov–Robbie Keane strike partnership was rewarded when they were named joint Player of the Month for April.

== Transfers ==
=== In ===
Date	Player	Previous club	Cost
June 2006	(Cameroon) Benoît Assou-Ekotto	(France) Lens	£3,500,000
July 2006	(Ivory Coast) Didier Zokora	(France) Saint-Étienne	£8,600,000
July 2006	(Bulgaria) Dimitar Berbatov	(Germany) Bayer Leverkusen	£10,900,000
July 2006	(Czech Republic) Tomáš Pekhart	(Czech Republic) Slavia Prague	Free
July 2006	(France) Dorian Dervite	(France) Lille	Undisclosed
August 2006	(Egypt) Mido	(Italy) Roma	Undisclosed
August 2006	(France) Steed Malbranque	(England) Fulham	£2,000,000
August 2006	(France) Pascal Chimbonda	(England) Wigan Athletic	£4,500,000
January 2007	(England) Ben Alnwick	(England) Sunderland	Player exchange
January 2007	(France) Adel Taarabt	(France) Lens	Undisclosed
January 2007	(Portugal) Ricardo Rocha	(Portugal) Benfica	£3,200,000
			Total
			£32,700,000+

=== Out ===
Date	Player	New club	Cost
June 2006	(England) Marcel McKie	Released	Contract expiry
June 2006	(Morocco) Noureddine Naybet	Released	Contract expiry
June 2006	(Serbia and Montenegro) Goran Bunjevčević	Released	Contract expiry
June 2006	(Netherlands) Mounir El Hamdaoui	(Netherlands) Willem II	Free
June 2006	(England) Dean Marney	(England) Hull City	Undisclosed
June 2006	(Republic of Ireland) Stephen Kelly	(England) Birmingham City	£750,000
June 2006	(England) Michael Carrick	(England) Manchester United	£18,600,000
August 2006	(Republic of Ireland) Andy Reid	(England) Charlton Athletic	£3,000,000
January 2007	(Netherlands) Edgar Davids	(Netherlands) Ajax	Free
January 2007	(England) Calum Davenport	(England) West Ham United	£3,000,000
January 2007	(Hungary) Márton Fülöp	(England) Sunderland	£500,000
			£25,850,000

=== Loaned out ===
Date	Player	Club	Loan length
August 2006	(England) Wayne Routledge	(England) Fulham	Season
August 2006	(Brazil) Rodrigo Defendi	(Italy) Roma	Season
August 2006	(Republic of Ireland) Mark Yeates	(England) Hull City	Season
November 2006	(England) Charlie Lee	(England) Millwall	Eight months
January 2007	(Switzerland) Reto Ziegler	(Italy) Sampdoria	Six months
January 2007	(England) Robert Burch	(England) Barnet	Six months
March 2007	(England) Charlie Daniels	(England) Chesterfield	One month

== First-team squad ==
Note: Flags indicate national team as defined under FIFA eligibility rules; some limited exceptions apply. Players may hold more than one non-FIFA nationality.

No.	Pos.	Nation	Player
1	GK	ENG	Paul Robinson
2	DF	FRA	Pascal Chimbonda
3	DF	KOR	Lee Young-pyo
4	MF	CIV	Didier Zokora
6	MF	FIN	Teemu Tainio
7	MF	CAN	Paul Stalteri
8	MF	ENG	Jermaine Jenas
9	FW	BUL	Dimitar Berbatov
10	FW	IRL	Robbie Keane
11	FW	EGY	Mido
12	GK	CZE	Radek Černý (on loan from Slavia Prague)
13	MF	ENG	Danny Murphy
14	MF	EGY	Hossam Ghaly
15	MF	FRA	Steed Malbranque
16	DF	SUI	Reto Ziegler
17	GK	ENG	Ben Alnwick
18	FW	ENG	Jermain Defoe

No.	Pos.	Nation	Player
19	MF	FRA	Adel Taarabt
20	DF	ENG	Michael Dawson
22	MF	ENG	Tom Huddlestone
24	MF	ENG	Jamie O'Hara
25	MF	ENG	Aaron Lennon
26	DF	ENG	Ledley King (captain)
28	FW	ENG	Lee Barnard
29	DF	ENG	Philip Ifil
30	DF	ENG	Anthony Gardner
32	DF	FRA	Benoît Assou-Ekotto
33	DF	POR	Ricardo Rocha
35	DF	FRA	Dorian Dervite
38	MF	ENG	Charlie Lee
39	FW	ENG	Andy Barcham
40	GK	ENG	Robert Burch
45	FW	ENG	Simon Dawkins

=== Left club during season ===
Note: Flags indicate national team as defined under FIFA eligibility rules; some limited exceptions apply. Players may hold more than one non-FIFA nationality.

No.	Pos.	Nation	Player
5	MF	NED	Edgar Davids (to Ajax)
17	GK	HUN	Márton Fülöp (to Sunderland)

No.	Pos.	Nation	Player
21	MF	ENG	Wayne Routledge (on loan to Fulham)
27	DF	ENG	Calum Davenport (to West Ham United)

== Competitions Overview ==
Competition	Record						
Competition	P	W	D	L	GF	GA	Win %
Premier League	38	17	9	12	57	54	44.74
FA Cup	6	3	2	1	15	5	50.00
League Cup	5	3	1	1	12	6	60.00
UEFA Cup	10	8	1	1	20	10	80.00
Total	59	31	13	15	104	75	52.54

== Results ==
=== Premier League ===
==== Results by matchday ====
Matchday	1	2	3	4	5	6	7	8	9	10	11	12	13	14	15	16	17	18	19	20	21	22	23	24	25	26	27	28	29	30	31	32	33	34	35	36	37	38
Ground	A	H	H	A	H	A	H	A	H	A	H	A	A	H	A	H	H	A	A	H	H	A	H	A	H	A	A	H	A	H	H	A	A	H	A	A	H	H
Result	L	W	L	L	D	L	W	D	W	D	W	L	D	W	L	W	W	W	L	W	L	D	L	D	L	L	W	W	W	W	W	L	D	D	W	W	D	W
Position	19	9	15	15	16	17	14	14	13	12	10	12	13	10	12	10	8	7	7	7	8	7	8	8	11	11	10	9	8	6	6	7	8	8	8	6	6	5

A = Away; H = Home; W = Win; D = Draw; L = Loss

19 August 2006 1	Bolton Wanderers	2–0	Tottenham Hotspur	Bolton, Greater Manchester
	Davies 9'; Campo 13'	Report		Stadium: Reebok Stadium; Attendance: 22,899; Referee: Phil Dowd

22 August 2006 2	Tottenham Hotspur	2–0	Sheffield United	Haringey, London
	Berbatov 7'; Jenas 17'	Report		Stadium: White Hart Lane; Attendance: 35,287; Referee: Peter Walton

26 August 2006 3	Tottenham Hotspur	0–2	Everton	Haringey, London
		Report	Davenport 53' (o.g.); Johnson 66'	Stadium: White Hart Lane; Attendance: 35,540; Referee: Mark Halsey

9 September 2006 4	Manchester United	1–0	Tottenham Hotspur	Trafford, Greater Manchester
	Giggs 8'	Report		Stadium: Old Trafford; Attendance: 75,453; Referee: Mike Riley

17 September 2006 5	Tottenham Hotspur	0–0	Fulham	Haringey, London
		Report		Stadium: White Hart Lane; Attendance: 36,131; Referee: Mark Clattenburg

23 September 2006 6	Liverpool	3–0	Tottenham Hotspur	Liverpool, Merseyside
	González 63'; Kuyt 73'; Riise 89'	Report		Stadium: Anfield; Attendance: 44,330; Referee: Howard Webb

1 October 2006 7	Tottenham Hotspur	2–1	Portsmouth	Haringey, London
	Murphy 2'; Defoe 35' (pen.)	Report	Kanu 40'	Stadium: White Hart Lane; Attendance: 36,063; Referee: Chris Foy

14 October 2006 8	Aston Villa	1–1	Tottenham Hotspur	Aston, Birmingham
	Barry 81'	Report	Ángel 76' (o.g.)	Stadium: Anfield; Attendance: 42,551; Referee: Martin Atkinson

22 October 2006 9	Tottenham Hotspur	1–0	West Ham United	Haringey, London
	Mido 45'	Report		Stadium: White Hart Lane; Attendance: 36,162; Referee: Steve Bennett

28 October 2006 10	Watford	0–0	Tottenham Hotspur	Watford, Hertfordshire
		Report		Stadium: Vicarage Road; Attendance: 19,660; Referee: Uriah Rennie

5 November 2006 11	Tottenham Hotspur	2–1	Chelsea	Haringey, London
	Dawson 25'; Lennon 52'	Report	Makélélé 15'	Stadium: White Hart Lane; Attendance: 36,070; Referee: Graham Poll

12 November 2006 12	Reading	3–1	Tottenham Hotspur	Reading, Berkshire
	Shorey 38'; Sidwell 45'; Doyle 79'	Report	Keane 24' (pen.)	Stadium: Madejski Stadium; Attendance: 24,110; Referee: Rob Styles

19 November 2006 13	Blackburn Rovers	1–1	Tottenham Hotspur	Blackburn, Lancashire
	Kerimoğlu 23'	Report	Defoe 62' (pen.)	Stadium: Ewood Park; Attendance: 18,083; Referee: Phil Dowd

26 November 2006 14	Tottenham Hotspur	3–1	Wigan Athletic	Haringey, London
	Defoe 43'; Berbatov 44'; Lennon 90'	Report	Camara 25'	Stadium: White Hart Lane; Attendance: 35,205; Referee: Mark Clattenburg

2 December 2006 15	Arsenal	3–0	Tottenham Hotspur	Holloway, London
	Adebayor 20'; Silva 42' (pen.), 72' (pen.)	Report		Stadium: Emirates Stadium; Attendance: 60,115; Referee: Graham Poll

5 December 2006 16	Tottenham Hotspur	2–1	Middlesbrough	Haringey, London
	Berbatov 48'; Keane 84'	Report	Huth 80'	Stadium: White Hart Lane; Attendance: 34,154; Referee: Mark Halsey

9 December 2006 17	Tottenham Hotspur	5–1	Charlton Athletic	Haringey, London
	Berbatov 31', 66'; Tainio 33'; Malbranque 55'; Defoe 63'	Report	Dawson 43' (o.g.)	Stadium: White Hart Lane; Attendance: 35,565; Referee: Mike Dean

17 December 2006 18	Manchester City	1–2	Tottenham Hotspur	Manchester
	Barton 64'	Report	Davenport 16'; Huddlestone 24'	Stadium: City of Manchester Stadium; Attendance: 39,825; Referee: Rob Styles

23 December 2006 19	Newcastle United	3–1	Tottenham Hotspur	Newcastle upon Tyne
	Dyer 2'; Martins 7'; Parker 34'	Report	Murphy 15'	Stadium: St James' Park; Attendance: 52,079; Referee: Alan Wiley

26 December 2006 20	Tottenham Hotspur	2–1	Aston Villa	Haringey, London
	Defoe 58', 77'	Report	Barry 81'	Stadium: White Hart Lane; Attendance: 35,293; Referee: Uriah Rennie

30 December 2006 21	Tottenham Hotspur	0–1	Liverpool	Haringey, London
		Report	García 45'	Stadium: White Hart Lane; Attendance: 36,170; Referee: Mark Halsey

1 January 2007 22	Portsmouth	1–1	Tottenham Hotspur	Portsmouth
	Benjani 29'	Report	Malbranque 50'	Stadium: Fratton Park; Attendance: 20,194; Referee: Andre Marriner

14 January 2007 23	Tottenham Hotspur	2–3	Newcastle United	Haringey, London
	Defoe 14'; Berbatov 54'	Report	Huntington 16'; Martins 72'; Butt 73'	Stadium: White Hart Lane; Attendance: 35,942; Referee: Steve Bennett

20 January 2007 24	Fulham	1–1	Tottenham Hotspur	Fulham, London
	Montella 84' (pen.)	Report	Chimbonda 88'	Stadium: Craven Cottage; Attendance: 23,580; Referee: Mike Dean

4 February 2007 25	Tottenham Hotspur	0–4	Manchester United	Haringey, London
		Report	Ronaldo 45' (pen.); Vidić 48'; Scholes 54'; Giggs 77'	Stadium: White Hart Lane; Attendance: 36,146; Referee: Mark Clattenburg

10 February 2007 26	Sheffield United	2–1	Tottenham Hotspur	Sheffield, South Yorkshire
	Hulse 27'; Jagielka 62' (pen.)	Report	Jenas 2'	Stadium: Bramall Lane; Attendance: 32,144; Referee: Martin Atkinson

21 February 2007 27	Everton	1–2	Tottenham Hotspur	Walton, Merseyside
	Arteta 42'	Report	Berbatov 35'; Jenas 89'	Stadium: Goodison Park; Attendance: 34,121; Referee: Uriah Rennie

25 February 2007 28	Tottenham Hotspur	4–1	Bolton Wanderers	Haringey, London
	Keane 11', 22'; Jenas 19'; Lennon 90'	Report	Speed 37' (pen.)	Stadium: White Hart Lane; Attendance: 35,747; Referee: Graham Poll

4 March 2007 29	West Ham United	3–4	Tottenham Hotspur	Upton Park, London
	Noble 16'; Tevez 41'; Zamora 85'	Report	Defoe 51' (pen.); Tainio 63'; Berbatov 89'; Stalteri 90'	Stadium: Boleyn Ground; Attendance: 34,966; Referee: Mike Dean

17 March 2007 30	Tottenham Hotspur	3–1	Watford	Haringey, London
	Jenas 41'; Robinson 63'; Ghaly 85'	Report	Henderson 89'	Stadium: White Hart Lane; Attendance: 36,051; Referee: Mark Halsey

1 April 2007 31	Tottenham Hotspur	1–0	Reading	Haringey, London
	Keane 41' (pen.)	Report		Stadium: White Hart Lane; Attendance: 36,067; Referee: Alan Wiley

7 April 2007 32	Chelsea	1–0	Tottenham Hotspur	Fulham, London
	Carvalho 41'	Report		Stadium: Stamford Bridge; Attendance: 41,864; Referee: Rob Styles

15 April 2007 33	Wigan Athletic	3–3	Tottenham Hotspur	Wigan, Greater Manchester
	Heskey 2'; Baines 30'; Kilbane 60'	Report	Berbatov 4'; Keane 35', 68'	Stadium: JJB Stadium; Attendance: 16,506; Referee: Graham Poll

21 April 2007 34	Tottenham Hotspur	2–2	Arsenal	Haringey, London
	Keane 30'; Jenas 90'	Report	Touré 64'; Adebayor 78'	Stadium: White Hart Lane; Attendance: 36,050; Referee: Mike Dean

28 April 2007 35	Middlesbrough	2–3	Tottenham Hotspur	Middlesbrough, North Yorkshire
	Viduka 66'; Pogatetz 89'	Report	Keane 12', 83'; Berbatov 47'	Stadium: Riverside Stadium; Attendance: 27,861; Referee: Lee Mason

7 May 2007 36	Charlton Athletic	0–2	Tottenham Hotspur	Charlton, London
		Report	Berbatov 7'; Defoe 90'	Stadium: The Valley; Attendance: 26,339; Referee: Mark Halsey

10 May 2007 37	Tottenham Hotspur	1–1	Blackburn Rovers	Haringey, London
	Defoe 67'	Report	McCarthy 32'	Stadium: White Hart Lane; Attendance: 35,974; Referee: Rob Styles

13 May 2007 38	Tottenham Hotspur	2–1	Manchester City	Haringey, London
	Keane 10'; Berbatov 32'	Report	Mpenza 40'	Stadium: White Hart Lane; Attendance: 35,426; Referee: Steve Bennett

=== FA Cup ===
7 January 2007 Third round	Cardiff City	0–0	Tottenham Hotspur	Leckwith, Cardiff
		Report		Stadium: Ninian Park; Attendance: 20,376; Referee: Howard Webb

17 January 2007 Third round replay	Tottenham Hotspur	4–0	Cardiff City	Haringey, London
	Lennon 27'; Keane 30'; Malbranque 41'; Defoe 81'	Report		Stadium: White Hart Lane; Attendance: 27,641; Referee: Mike Riley

27 January 2007 Fourth round	Tottenham Hotspur	3–1	Southend United	Haringey, London
	Keane 12'; Jenas 50'; Mido 76'	Report	Eastwood 69' (pen.)	Stadium: White Hart Lane; Attendance: 33,406; Referee: Rob Styles

18 February 2007 Fifth round	Fulham	0–4	Tottenham Hotspur	Fulham, London
		Report	Keane 6', 68'; Berbatov 77', 90'	Stadium: Craven Cottage; Attendance: 18,655; Referee: Mark Halsey

11 March 2007 Sixth round	Chelsea	3–3	Tottenham Hotspur	Fulham, London
	Lampard 22', 71'; Kalou 86'	Report	Berbatov 5'; Essien 28' (o.g.); Ghaly 36'	Stadium: Stamford Bridge; Attendance: 41,517; Referee: Mike Riley

19 March 2007 Sixth round replay	Tottenham Hotspur	1–2	Chelsea	Haringey, London
	Keane 79' (pen.)	Report	Shevchenko 55'; Wright-Phillips 61'	Stadium: White Hart Lane; Attendance: 35,519; Referee: Martin Atkinson

=== League Cup ===
25 October 2006 Third round	MK Dons	0–5	Tottenham Hotspur	Milton Keynes, Buckinghamshire
		Report	Mido 36', 60'; Defoe 44', 51'; Keane 90'	Stadium: Stadium mk Attendance: 8,306; Referee: Keith Stroud

8 November 2006 Fourth round	Tottenham Hotspur	3–1 (a.e.t.)	Port Vale	Haringey, London
	Huddlestone 80', 99'; Defoe 107'	Report	Constantine 64'	Stadium: White Hart Lane; Attendance: 34,560; Referee: Steve Bennett

20 December 2006 Fifth round	Tottenham Hotspur	1–0 (a.e.t.)	Southend United	Haringey, London
	Defoe 115'	Report		Stadium: White Hart Lane; Attendance: 35,811; Referee: Phil Dowd

24 January 2007 Semi-finals first Leg	Tottenham Hotspur	2–2	Arsenal	Haringey, London
	Berbatov 12'; Baptista 21' (o.g.)	Report	Baptista 64', 77'	Stadium: White Hart Lane; Attendance: 35,485; Referee: Graham Poll

31 January 2007 Semi-finals second Leg	Arsenal	3–1 (a.e.t.)	Tottenham Hotspur	Holloway, London
	Adebayor 77'; Aliadière 105'; Chimbonda 113' (o.g.)	Report	Mido 85'	Stadium: Emirates Stadium; Attendance: 59,872; Referee: Alan Wiley

=== UEFA Cup ===
==== First round ====
14 September 2006 First round first leg	Slavia Prague	0–1	Tottenham Hotspur	Vršovice, Prague
		Report	Jenas 37'	Stadium: Stadion Evžena Rošického; Attendance: 14,869; Referee: Herve Piccirillo

28 September 2006 First round second leg	Tottenham Hotspur	1–0	Slavia Prague	Haringey, London
	Keane 80'	Report		Stadium: White Hart Lane; Attendance: 35,191; Referee: Tommy Skjerven

==== Group stage ====
19 October 2006 Group B	Beşiktaş	0–2	Tottenham Hotspur	Beşiktaş, Istanbul
		Report	Ghaly 32'; Berbatov 63'	Stadium: BJK İnönü Stadium; Attendance: 26,800; Referee: Nicolai Vollquartz

2 November 2006 Group B	Tottenham Hotspur	3–1	Club Brugge	Haringey, London
	Berbatov 17', 73'; Keane 63'	Report	Salou 14'	Stadium: White Hart Lane; Attendance: 35,716; Referee: Alberto Undiano Mallenco

23 November 2006 Group B	Bayer Leverkusen	0–1	Tottenham Hotspur	Leverkusen, North Rhine-Westphalia
		Report	Berbatov 36'	Stadium: BayArena; Attendance: 22,500; Referee: Martin Hansson

14 December 2006 Group B	Tottenham Hotspur	3–1	Dinamo București	Haringey, London
	Berbatov 17'; Defoe 39', 50'	Report	Mendy 90'	Stadium: White Hart Lane; Attendance: 34,004; Referee: Bernhard Brugger

Pos	Team	Pld	W	D	L	GF	GA	GD	Pts	Qualification	TOT	DB	LEV	BJK	BRU
1	(England) Tottenham Hotspur	4	4	0	0	9	2	+7	12	Advance to knockout stage	—	3–1	—	—	3–1
2	(Romania) Dinamo București	4	2	1	1	6	6	0	7	Advance to knockout stage	—	—	2–1	2–1	—
3	(Germany) Bayer Leverkusen	4	1	1	2	4	5	−1	4	Advance to knockout stage	0–1	—	—	2–1	—
4	(Turkey) Beşiktaş	4	1	0	3	4	7	−3	3		0–2	—	—	—	2–1
5	(Belgium) Club Brugge	4	0	2	2	4	7	−3	2		—	1–1	1–1	—	—

==== Knock-out rounds ====
Round of 32 first leg	Feyenoord	(w/o)	Tottenham Hotspur

Round of 32 second leg	Tottenham Hotspur	(w/o)	Feyenoord

8 March 2007 Round of 16 first leg	Braga	2–3	Tottenham Hotspur	Real, Dume e Semelhe, Braga
	Paulo Jorge 76'; Zé Carlos 81'	Report	Keane 59'; Malbranque 72'; Keane 90'	Stadium: Estádio Municipal de Braga; Attendance: 15,000; Referee: Yuri Baskakov

14 March 2007 Round of 16 second leg	Tottenham Hotspur	3–2	Braga	Haringey, London
	Berbatov 28', 42'; Huddlestone 76'	Report	Huddlestone 24' (o.g.); Andrade 61'	Stadium: White Hart Lane; Attendance: 33,761; Referee: Laurent Duhamel

5 April 2007 Quarter-finals first leg	Sevilla	2–1	Tottenham Hotspur	Seville, Andalusia
	Kanouté 19' (pen.); Kerzhakov 35'	Report	Keane 2'	Stadium: Ramón Sánchez Pizjuán Stadium; Attendance: 32,000; Referee: Alain Hamer

12 April 2007 Quarter-finals second leg	Tottenham Hotspur	2–2	Sevilla	Haringey, London
	Defoe 65'; Lennon 67'	Report	Malbranque 3' (o.g.); Kanouté 8'	Stadium: White Hart Lane; Attendance: 35,284; Referee: Konrad Plautz

== Final Premier League table ==
Pos	Team	Pld	W	D	L	GF	GA	GD	Pts	Qualification or relegation
3	Liverpool	38	20	8	10	57	27	+30	68	Qualification for the Champions League third qualifying round
4	Arsenal	38	19	11	8	63	35	+28	68	Qualification for the Champions League third qualifying round
5	Tottenham Hotspur	38	17	9	12	57	54	+3	60	Qualification for the UEFA Cup first round (Note: Since both finalists of the FA Cup (Manchester United and Chelsea) and the League Cup winners (Chelsea) were qualified for the Champions League, their UEFA Cup spots were given to the 6th- and 7th-placed Premier League teams.)
6	Everton	38	15	13	10	52	36	+16	58	Qualification for the UEFA Cup first round
7	Bolton Wanderers	38	16	8	14	47	52	−5	56	Qualification for the UEFA Cup first round

Source: Barclays Premier League
Rules for classification: 1) points; 2) goal difference; 3) number of goals scored.

== Statistics ==
=== Appearances ===
Last updated: 26 May 2007.
Source: premierleague.com

No.	Pos.	Name	Premier League		FA Cup		League Cup		UEFA Cup		Total	
No.	Pos.	Name	Apps	Goals	Apps	Goals	Apps	Goals	Apps	Goals	Apps	Goals
Goalkeepers
1	GK	(England) Paul Robinson	38	1	4	0	3	0	9	0	54	1
12	GK	(Czech Republic) Radek Černý	0	0	2	0	2	0	1	0	5	0
Defenders
2	DF	(France) Pascal Chimbonda	33	1	4	0	2	0	10	0	49	1
3	DF	(South Korea) Lee Young-Pyo	20+1	0	5	0	1	0	4	0	30+1	0
7	DF	(Canada) Paul Stalteri	1+5	1	2+1	0	2	0	2+1	0	7+7	1
16	DF	(Switzerland) Reto Ziegler	0+1	0	0	0	1	0	1+1	0	2+2	0
20	DF	(England) Michael Dawson	37	1	6	0	4+1	0	10	0	57+1	1
26	DF	(England) Ledley King	21	0	0	0	0	0	6	0	27	0
29	DF	(England) Phil Ifil	1	0	0	0	1	0	0	0	2	0
30	DF	(England) Anthony Gardner	6+2	0	2+2	0	3	0	1	0	12+4	0
32	DF	(Cameroon) Benoît Assou-Ekotto	16	0	1	0	3	0	5	0	25	0
33	DF	(Portugal) Ricardo Rocha	9	0	3	0	0+1	0	0	0	12+1	0
35	DF	(France) Dorian Dervite	0	0	0	0	1	0	0	0	1	0
Midfielders
4	MF	(Ivory Coast) Didier Zokora	26+5	0	5	0	2	0	9	0	42+5	0
6	MF	(Finland) Teemu Tainio	20+1	2	3+1	0	1	0	5+1	0	29+3	2
8	MF	(England) Jermaine Jenas	24+1	6	2	1	1	0	6	1	33+1	8
13	MF	(England) Danny Murphy	5+7	2	1	0	3	0	2+1	0	11+8	2
14	MF	(Egypt) Hossam Ghaly	17+4	1	2+2	1	2+1	0	3+3	1	24+10	3
15	MF	(France) Steed Malbranque	18+7	2	4+2	1	4	0	4+2	2	30+11	5
19	MF	(Morocco) Adel Taarabt	0+2	0	0	0	0	0	0	0	0+2	0
22	MF	(England) Tom Huddlestone	15+6	1	2+1	0	4+1	2	4+2	0	25+10	3
25	MF	(England) Aaron Lennon	22+4	3	5+1	1	1+2	0	7+1	1	35+8	5
Forwards
9	FW	(Bulgaria) Dimitar Berbatov	30+3	12	4+1	3	1+2	1	8	7	43+6	23
10	FW	(Republic of Ireland) Robbie Keane	18+9	11	4+1	5	1+2	1	8+1	5	31+13	22
11	FW	(Egypt) Mido	7+5	1	2+1	1	2+2	3	2+2	0	13+10	5
18	FW	(England) Jermain Defoe	20+14	10	2+3	1	5	4	2+3	3	29+20	18
39	FW	(England) Andy Barcham	0	0	0	0	1	0	0	0	1	0
Players transferred out during the season
5	MF	(Netherlands) Edgar Davids	6+3	0	0	0	2+1	0	0+1	0	8+5	0
27	MF	(England) Calum Davenport	8+2	1	1	0	2	0	1+1	0	12+3	1

=== Goal scorers ===
Last updated: 26 July 2020.
Source: premierleague.com

The list is sorted by shirt number when total goals are equal.

Rnk	Pos	No.	Player	Premier League	FA Cup	League Cup	UEFA Cup	Total
1	FW	9	(Bulgaria) Dimitar Berbatov	12	3	1	7	23
2	FW	10	(Republic of Ireland) Robbie Keane	11	5	1	5	22
3	FW	18	(England) Jermain Defoe	10	1	4	3	18
4	MF	8	(England) Jermaine Jenas	6	1	0	1	8
5	FW	11	(Egypt) Mido	1	1	3	0	5
5	MF	15	(France) Steed Malbranque	2	1	0	2	5
5	MF	25	(England) Aaron Lennon	3	1	0	1	5
8	MF	14	(Egypt) Hossam Ghaly	1	1	0	1	3
8	MF	22	(England) Tom Huddlestone	1	0	2	0	3
10	MF	6	(Finland) Teemu Tainio	2	0	0	0	2
10	MF	13	(England) Danny Murphy	2	0	0	0	2
12	GK	1	(England) Paul Robinson	1	0	0	0	1
12	DF	2	(France) Pascal Chimbonda	1	0	0	0	1
12	DF	7	(Canada) Paul Stalteri	1	0	0	0	1
12	DF	20	(England) Michael Dawson	1	0	0	0	1
12	DF	27	(England) Calum Davenport	1	0	0	0	1
TOTALS				56	14	11	20	101

=== Clean sheets ===
Last updated: 26 July 2020.
Source: premierleague.com

The list is sorted by shirt number when total clean sheets are equal.

Rnk	No.	Player	Premier League	FA Cup	League Cup	UEFA Cup	Total
1	1	(England) Paul Robinson	6	3	1	4	14
2	12	(Czech Republic) Radek Černý	0	0	1	0	1
TOTALS			6	3	2	4	15
