= 2006–07 UEFA Cup knockout stage =

International football competition

The knockout stage of the 2006–07 UEFA Cup began on 14 February 2007, culminating with the final at Hampden Park, Glasgow, on 16 May 2007. The knockout stage included the top three teams from each group in the previous stage and the third-placed teams from the 2006–07 UEFA Champions League group stage.

Each knockout round tie consisted of two-legged matches, home and away, in which the team with the higher aggregate score progressed to the next round, with the exception of the final, which was played over just one match at a neutral venue. In the event that the two teams' aggregate scores were tied, the team that scored more goals in their away leg would progress to the next round.

Times are CET/CEST, (Note: CET (UTC+1) for dates up to 24 March 2007 (round of 32 and round of 16), and CEST (UTC+2) for dates thereafter (quarter-finals, semi-finals and final).) as listed by UEFA.

== Qualified teams ==
The knockout stage involved 32 teams: the 24 teams which qualified as the winners, runners-up and third-placed teams of each of the eight groups in the group stage, and the eight third-placed teams from the Champions League group stage.

=== UEFA Cup group stage top-three teams ===
Group	Winners	Runners-up	Third-placed teams
A	(Scotland) Rangers	(Israel) Maccabi Haifa	(Italy) Livorno
B	(England) Tottenham Hotspur	(Romania) Dinamo București	(Germany) Bayer Leverkusen
C	(Netherlands) AZ	(Spain) Sevilla	(Portugal) Braga
D	(Italy) Parma	(Spain) Osasuna	(France) Lens
E	(England) Blackburn Rovers	(France) Nancy	(Netherlands) Feyenoord
F	(Spain) Espanyol	(Netherlands) Ajax	(Belgium) Zulte Waregem
G	(Greece) Panathinaikos	(France) Paris Saint-Germain	(Israel) Hapoel Tel Aviv
H	(England) Newcastle United	(Spain) Celta Vigo	(Turkey) Fenerbahçe

=== Champions League group stage third-placed teams ===
Group	Third-placed teams
A	(Germany) Werder Bremen
B	(Russia) Spartak Moscow
C	(France) Bordeaux
D	(Ukraine) Shakhtar Donetsk
E	(Romania) Steaua București
F	(Portugal) Benfica
G	(Russia) CSKA Moscow
H	(Greece) AEK Athens

== Bracket ==
Round of 32
(Russia) CSKA Moscow	0	0	0
(Israel) Maccabi Haifa	0	1	1
(Italy) Livorno	1	0	1
(Spain) Espanyol	2	2	4
(Greece) AEK Athens	0	0	0
(France) Paris Saint-Germain	2	2	4
(Portugal) Benfica	1	2	3
(Romania) Dinamo București	0	1	1
(Belgium) Zulte Waregem	1	0	1
(England) Newcastle United	3	1	4
(Turkey) Fenerbahçe	3	2	5
(Netherlands) AZ (a)	3	2	5
(Russia) Spartak Moscow	1	1	2
(Spain) Celta Vigo	1	2	3
(Germany) Werder Bremen	3	1	4
(Netherlands) Ajax	0	3	3
(France) Lens	3	0	3
(Greece) Panathinaikos	1	0	1
(Germany) Bayer Leverkusen	3	0	3
(England) Blackburn Rovers	2	0	2
(Israel) Hapoel Tel Aviv	2	0	2
(Scotland) Rangers	1	4	5
(France) Bordeaux	0	0	0
(Spain) Osasuna (a.e.t.)	0	1	1
(Romania) Steaua București	0	0	0
(Spain) Sevilla	2	1	3
(Ukraine) Shakhtar Donetsk	1	1	2
(France) Nancy	1	0	1
(Portugal) Braga	1	1	2
(Italy) Parma	0	0	0
(Netherlands) Feyenoord	—	—	—
(England) Tottenham Hotspur (w/o)	—	—	—

Round of 16
(Israel) Maccabi Haifa	0	0	0
(Spain) Espanyol	0	4	4
(France) Paris Saint-Germain	2	1	3
(Portugal) Benfica	1	3	4
(England) Newcastle United	4	0	4
(Netherlands) AZ (a)	2	2	4
(Spain) Celta Vigo	0	0	0
(Germany) Werder Bremen	1	2	3
(France) Lens	2	0	2
(Germany) Bayer Leverkusen	0	3	3
(Scotland) Rangers	1	0	1
(Spain) Osasuna	1	1	2
(Spain) Sevilla (a.e.t.)	2	3	5
(Ukraine) Shakhtar Donetsk	2	2	4
(Portugal) Braga	2	2	4
(England) Tottenham Hotspur	3	3	6

Quarter-finals
(Spain) Espanyol	3	0	3
(Portugal) Benfica	2	0	2
(Netherlands) AZ	0	1	1
(Germany) Werder Bremen	0	4	4
(Germany) Bayer Leverkusen	0	0	0
(Spain) Osasuna	3	1	4
(Spain) Sevilla	2	2	4
(England) Tottenham Hotspur	1	2	3

Semi-finals
(Spain) Espanyol	3	2	5
(Germany) Werder Bremen	0	1	1
(Spain) Osasuna	1	0	1
(Spain) Sevilla	0	2	2

Final
16 May – Glasgow
(Spain) Espanyol	2 (1)
(Spain) Sevilla (p)	2 (3)

== Round of 32 ==
=== Summary ===
The first legs were held on 14 February and 15 February 2007, while the second legs were held on 22 February 2007.

Team 1	Agg.	Team 2	1st leg	2nd leg
Zulte Waregem (Belgium)	1–4	(England) Newcastle United	1–3	0–1
Braga (Portugal)	2–0	(Italy) Parma	1–0	1–0
Lens (France)	3–1	(Greece) Panathinaikos	3–1	0–0
Bayer Leverkusen (Germany)	3–2	(England) Blackburn Rovers	3–2	0–0
Hapoel Tel Aviv (Israel)	2–5	(Scotland) Rangers	2–1	0–4
Livorno (Italy)	1–4	(Spain) Espanyol	1–2	0–2
Feyenoord (Netherlands)	w/o (Note: On 19 January 2007, UEFA declared that Feyenoord had been disqualified after crowd misbehaviour in their final group stage match against Nancy. UEFA announced on 25 January that Tottenham Hotspur had received a bye. This was confirmed after a final appeal.)	(England) Tottenham Hotspur	Canc.	Canc.
Fenerbahçe (Turkey)	5–5 (a)	(Netherlands) AZ	3–3	2–2
Werder Bremen (Germany)	4–3	(Netherlands) Ajax	3–0	1–3
Spartak Moscow (Russia)	2–3	(Spain) Celta Vigo	1–1	1–2
CSKA Moscow (Russia)	0–1	(Israel) Maccabi Haifa	0–0	0–1
AEK Athens (Greece)	0–4	(France) Paris Saint-Germain	0–2	0–2
Benfica (Portugal)	3–1	(Romania) Dinamo București	1–0	2–1
Steaua București (Romania)	0–3	(Spain) Sevilla	0–2	0–1
Shakhtar Donetsk (Ukraine)	2–1	(France) Nancy	1–1	1–0
Bordeaux (France)	0–1	(Spain) Osasuna	0–0	0–1 (a.e.t.)

=== Matches ===
15 February 2007
20:45

Zulte Waregem (Belgium)	1–3	(England) Newcastle United
D'Haene 69'	Report	Dindeleux 47' (o.g.); Martins 59' (pen.); Sibierski 76'

Jules Otten, Gent
Attendance: 8,015
Referee: Anton Genov (Bulgaria)
22 February 2007
20:45

Newcastle United (England)	1–0	(Belgium) Zulte Waregem
Martins 68'	Report

St James' Park, Newcastle
Attendance: 30,083
Referee: Nikolai Ivanov (Russia)

Newcastle United won 4–1 on aggregate.

15 February 2007
20:00

Braga (Portugal)	1–0	(Italy) Parma
Zé Carlos 81'	Report

Estádio Municipal de Braga, Braga
Attendance: 6,046
Referee: Damir Skomina (Slovenia)
22 February 2007
20:45

Parma (Italy)	0–1	(Portugal) Braga
	Report	Costa 90'

Stadio Ennio Tardini, Parma
Attendance: 3,861
Referee: Vladimír Hriňák (Slovakia)

Braga won 2–0 on aggregate.

15 February 2007
20:45

Lens (France)	3–1	(Greece) Panathinaikos
Jemâa 50', 70'; Dindane 90' (pen.)	Report	Salpingidis 65'

Stade Félix-Bollaert, Lens
Attendance: 29,944
Referee: Jonas Eriksson (Sweden)
22 February 2007
20:45

Panathinaikos (Greece)	0–0	(France) Lens
	Report

Olympic Stadium, Athens
Attendance: 40,914
Referee: Jaroslav Jára (Czech Republic)

Lens won 3–1 on aggregate.

14 February 2007
18:15

Bayer Leverkusen (Germany)	3–2	(England) Blackburn Rovers
Callsen-Bracker 18'; Ramelow 43'; Schneider 56'	Report	Bentley 38'; Nonda 87'

BayArena, Leverkusen
Attendance: 17,906
Referee: Pieter Vink (Netherlands)
22 February 2007
19:00

Blackburn Rovers (England)	0–0	(Germany) Bayer Leverkusen
	Report

Ewood Park, Blackburn
Attendance: 25,124
Referee: Alberto Undiano Mallenco (Spain)

Bayer Leverkusen won 3–2 on aggregate.

14 February 2007
20:05

Hapoel Tel Aviv (Israel)	2–1	(Scotland) Rangers
Toema 43'; Dego 76'	Report	Novo 53'

Bloomfield Stadium, Tel Aviv
Attendance: 13,000
Referee: Pedro Proença (Portugal)
22 February 2007
21:05

Rangers (Scotland)	4–0	(Israel) Hapoel Tel Aviv
Ferguson 24', 73'; Boyd 35'; Adam 90+5'	Report

Ibrox, Glasgow
Attendance: 46,213
Referee: Matteo Trefoloni (Italy)

Rangers won 5–2 on aggregate.

14 February 2007
20:45

Livorno (Italy)	1–2	(Spain) Espanyol
Galante 82'	Report	Pandiani 28' (pen.); Moha 59'

Stadio Armando Picchi, Livorno
Attendance: 400 (Note: On 7 February, the Italian government ruled that Livorno's stadium did not meet safety requirements following riots that occurred after a Serie A match in Sicily. Both sides played their home legs behind closed doors.)
Referee: Stéphane Lannoy (France)
22 February 2007
21:30

Espanyol (Spain)	2–0	(Italy) Livorno
Lacruz 15'; Coro 49'	Report

Estadi Olímpic Lluís Companys, Barcelona
Attendance: 12,134
Referee: Paul Allaerts (Belgium)

Espanyol won 4–1 on aggregate.

15 February 2007

Feyenoord (Netherlands)	Cancelled (Note: On 19 January, UEFA declared that Feyenoord had been disqualified after crowd misbehaviour in their final group stage match against Nancy. UEFA announced on 25 January that Tottenham Hotspur had received a bye. This was confirmed after a final appeal.)	(England) Tottenham Hotspur
	Report

De Kuip, Rotterdam
22 February 2007

Tottenham Hotspur (England)	Cancelled	(Netherlands) Feyenoord
	Report

White Hart Lane, London

Tottenham Hotspur won on walkover as Feyenoord were disqualified.

14 February 2007
19:00

Fenerbahçe (Turkey)	3–3	(Netherlands) AZ
Metin 27', 73'; Tuncay 65'	Report	De Zeeuw 15'; Boukhari 62'; Jenner 63'

Şükrü Saracoğlu, Istanbul
Attendance: 38,711
Referee: Eduardo Iturralde González (Spain)
22 February 2007
18:45

AZ (Netherlands)	2–2	(Turkey) Fenerbahçe
Martens 63'; Opdam 86'	Report	Metin 21'; Alex 34'

DSB Stadion, Alkmaar
Attendance: 16,191
Referee: Knut Kircher (Germany)

5–5 on aggregate; AZ won on away goals.

14 February 2007
20:30

Werder Bremen (Germany)	3–0	(Netherlands) Ajax
Mertesacker 48'; Naldo 54'; Frings 71'	Report

Weserstadion, Bremen
Attendance: 37,500
Referee: Lucílio Batista (Portugal)
22 February 2007
21:00

Ajax (Netherlands)	3–1	(Germany) Werder Bremen
Leonardo 4'; Huntelaar 60'; Babel 74'	Report	Almeida 14'

Amsterdam Arena, Amsterdam
Attendance: 35,225
Referee: Howard Webb (England)

Werder Bremen won 4–3 on aggregate.

15 February 2007
16:00

Spartak Moscow (Russia)	1–1	(Spain) Celta Vigo
Kalynychenko 65'	Report	Núñez 41'

Luzhniki Stadium, Moscow
Attendance: 30,000
Referee: Costas Kapitanis (Cyprus)
22 February 2007
20:45

Celta Vigo (Spain)	2–1	(Russia) Spartak Moscow
Nenê 19'; Aspas 78'	Report	Titov 88'

Balaídos, Vigo
Attendance: 8,000
Referee: Laurent Duhamel (France)

Celta Vigo won 3–2 on aggregate.

14 February 2007
17:00

CSKA Moscow (Russia)	0–0	(Israel) Maccabi Haifa
	Report

Republican Spartak Stadium, Vladikavkaz
Attendance: 18,100
Referee: Darko Ceferin (Slovenia)
22 February 2007
18:45

Maccabi Haifa (Israel)	1–0	(Russia) CSKA Moscow
Colautti 13'	Report

Bloomfield Stadium, Tel Aviv (Note: Maccabi Haifa played their home matches at Bloomfield Stadium in Tel Aviv instead of their regular stadium, Kiryat Eliezer Stadium, Haifa.)
Attendance: 13,500
Referee: Gerald Lehner (Austria)

Maccabi Haifa won 1–0 on aggregate.

14 February 2007
20:45

AEK Athens (Greece)	0–2	(France) Paris Saint-Germain
	Report	Traoré 45+1'; Mendy 88'

OACA Spyro Louis, Athens
Attendance: 26,120
Referee: Craig Thomson (Scotland)
22 February 2007
20:45

Paris Saint-Germain (France)	2–0	(Greece) AEK Athens
Frau 42'; Mendy 90+1'	Report

Parc des Princes, Paris
Attendance: 22,670
Referee: Gianluca Paparesta (Italy)

Paris Saint-Germain won 4–0 on aggregate.

14 February 2007
21:00

Benfica (Portugal)	1–0	(Romania) Dinamo București
Miccoli 90'	Report

Estádio do Sport Lisboa e Benfica, Lisbon
Attendance: 35,197
Referee: Ivan Bebek (Croatia)
22 February 2007
19:45

Dinamo București (Romania)	1–2	(Portugal) Benfica
Munteanu 24'	Report	Anderson 50'; Katsouranis 64'

Dinamo Stadium, Bucharest
Attendance: 12,480
Referee: Nicolai Vollquartz (Denmark)

Benfica won 3–1 on aggregate.

15 February 2007
19:30

Steaua București (Romania)	0–2	(Spain) Sevilla
	Report	Poulsen 41'; Kanouté 77' (pen.)

Steaua Stadium, Bucharest
Attendance: 23,927
Referee: Florian Meyer (Germany)
22 February 2007
20:45

Sevilla (Spain)	1–0	(Romania) Steaua București
Kerzhakov 45+3'	Report

Ramón Sánchez Pizjuán Stadium, Seville
Attendance: 20,000
Referee: Stuart Dougal (Scotland)

Sevilla won 3–0 on aggregate.

14 February 2007
18:00

Shakhtar Donetsk (Ukraine)	1–1	(France) Nancy
Srna 84'	Report	Fortuné 81'

RSC Olimpiyskiy, Donetsk
Attendance: 24,800
Referee: Athanassios Briakos (Greece)
22 February 2007
19:00

Nancy (France)	0–1	(Ukraine) Shakhtar Donetsk
	Report	Fernandinho 71'

Stade Marcel Picot, Tomblaine
Attendance: 16,564
Referee: Grzegorz Gilewski (Poland)

Shakhtar Donetsk won 2–1 on aggregate.

14 February 2007
18:00

Bordeaux (France)	0–0	(Spain) Osasuna
	Report

Stade Chaban Delmas, Bordeaux
Attendance: 17,676
Referee: Alon Yefet (Israel)
22 February 2007
20:45

Osasuna (Spain)	1–0 (a.e.t.)	(France) Bordeaux
Nekounam 120'	Report

Estadio Reyno de Navarra, Pamplona
Attendance: 17,542
Referee: Domenico Messina (Italy)

Osasuna won 1–0 on aggregate.

== Round of 16 ==
=== Summary ===
The first legs were held on 8 March 2007, while the second legs were held on 14 and 15 March 2007.

Team 1	Agg.	Team 2	1st leg	2nd leg
Newcastle United (England)	4–4 (a)	(Netherlands) AZ	4–2	0–2
Maccabi Haifa (Israel)	0–4	(Spain) Espanyol	0–0	0–4
Rangers (Scotland)	1–2	(Spain) Osasuna	1–1	0–1
Braga (Portugal)	4–6	(England) Tottenham Hotspur	2–3	2–3
Sevilla (Spain)	5–4	(Ukraine) Shakhtar Donetsk	2–2	3–2 (a.e.t.)
Lens (France)	2–4	(Germany) Bayer Leverkusen	2–1	0–3
Paris Saint-Germain (France)	3–4	(Portugal) Benfica	2–1	1–3
Celta Vigo (Spain)	0–3	(Germany) Werder Bremen	0–1	0–2

=== Matches ===
8 March 2007
20:30

Newcastle United (England)	4–2	(Netherlands) AZ
Steinsson 7' (o.g.); Dyer 22'; Martins 23', 37'	Report	Arveladze 31'; Koevermans 73'

St James' Park, Newcastle-upon-Tyne
Attendance: 28,452
Referee: Massimo Busacca (Switzerland)
15 March 2007
20:35

AZ (Netherlands)	2–0	(England) Newcastle United
Arveladze 14'; Koevermans 56'	Report

DSB Stadion, Alkmaar
Attendance: 16,401
Referee: Bertrand Layec (France)

4–4 on aggregate; AZ won on away goals.

8 March 2007
18:45

Maccabi Haifa (Israel)	0–0	(Spain) Espanyol
	Report

Bloomfield Stadium, Tel Aviv
Attendance: 14,750
Referee: Ivan Bebek (Croatia)
15 March 2007
21:30

Espanyol (Spain)	4–0	(Israel) Maccabi Haifa
De la Peña 53'; Tamudo 59'; L. García 61'; Pandiani 90'	Report

Estadi Olímpic Lluís Companys, Barcelona
Attendance: 16,150
Referee: Peter Fröjdfeldt (Sweden)

Espanyol won 4–0 on aggregate.

8 March 2007
21:05

Rangers (Scotland)	1–1	(Spain) Osasuna
Hemdani 90'	Report	García 17'

Ibrox Stadium, Glasgow
Attendance: 50,290
Referee: Jan Wegereef (Netherlands)
14 March 2007
20:45

Osasuna (Spain)	1–0	(Scotland) Rangers
Webó 71'	Report

Estadio Reyno de Navarra, Pamplona
Attendance: 19,126
Referee: Claus Bo Larsen (Denmark)

Osasuna won 2–1 on aggregate.

8 March 2007
22:35

Braga (Portugal)	2–3	(England) Tottenham Hotspur
Paulo Jorge 76'; Zé Carlos 81'	Report	Keane 57', 90'; Malbranque 72'

Estádio Municipal, Braga
Attendance: 15,000
Referee: Yuri Baskakov (Russia)
14 March 2007
21:15

Tottenham Hotspur (England)	3–2	(Portugal) Braga
Berbatov 28', 42'; Malbranque 76'	Report	Huddlestone 24' (o.g.); Andrade 61'

White Hart Lane, London
Attendance: 33,761
Referee: Laurent Duhamel (France)

Tottenham Hotspur won 6–4 on aggregate.

8 March 2007
20:45

Sevilla (Spain)	2–2	(Ukraine) Shakhtar Donetsk
Martí 8' (pen.); Maresca 88' (pen.)	Report	Hübschman 19'; Matuzalém 60' (pen.)

Ramón Sánchez Pizjuán Stadium, Seville
Attendance: 34,500
Referee: Viktor Kassai (Hungary)
15 March 2007
19:30

Shakhtar Donetsk (Ukraine)	2–3 (a.e.t.)	(Spain) Sevilla
Matuzalém 49'; Elano 83'	Report	Maresca 53'; Palop 90+4'; Chevantón 105'

RSC Olimpiyskiy, Donetsk
Attendance: 25,500
Referee: Gianluca Paparesta (Italy)

Sevilla won 5–4 on aggregate.

8 March 2007
19:00

Lens (France)	2–1	(Germany) Bayer Leverkusen
Monterrubio 17'; Cousin 70' (pen.)	Report	Haggui 51'

Stade Félix Bollaert, Lens
Attendance: 29,200
Referee: Howard Webb (England)
14 March 2007
18:15

Bayer Leverkusen (Germany)	3–0	(France) Lens
Voronin 36'; Barbarez 56'; Juan 70'	Report

BayArena, Leverkusen
Attendance: 22,000
Referee: Olegário Benquerença (Portugal)

Bayer Leverkusen won 4–2 on aggregate.

8 March 2007
20:45

Paris Saint-Germain (France)	2–1	(Portugal) Benfica
Pauleta 36'; Frau 41'	Report	Simão 9'

Parc des Princes, Paris
Attendance: 33,962
Referee: Graham Poll (England)
15 March 2007
22:00

Benfica (Portugal)	3–1	(France) Paris Saint-Germain
Simão 12', 88' (pen.); Petit 27'	Report	Pauleta 32'

Estádio da Luz, Lisbon
Attendance: 58,800
Referee: Florian Meyer (Germany)

Benfica won 4–3 on aggregate.

8 March 2007
20:45

Celta Vigo (Spain)	0–1	(Germany) Werder Bremen
	Report	Almeida 84'

Balaídos, Vigo
Attendance: 9,236
Referee: Robert Małek (Poland)
14 March 2007
20:45

Werder Bremen (Germany)	2–0	(Spain) Celta Vigo
Almeida 48'; Fritz 61'	Report

Weserstadion, Bremen
Attendance: 35,278
Referee: Stefano Farina (Italy)

Werder Bremen won 3–0 on aggregate.

== Quarter-finals ==
=== Summary ===
The draw for the final stages, included quarter-finals and semi-finals, was held on 16 March 2007 in Glasgow, Scotland. The quarter-final matches were played on 5 April and 12 April 2007.

Team 1	Agg.	Team 2	1st leg	2nd leg
AZ (Netherlands)	1–4	(Germany) Werder Bremen	0–0	1–4
Bayer Leverkusen (Germany)	0–4	(Spain) Osasuna	0–3	0–1
Sevilla (Spain)	4–3	(England) Tottenham Hotspur	2–1	2–2
Espanyol (Spain)	3–2	(Portugal) Benfica	3–2	0–0

=== Matches ===
5 April 2007
20:45

AZ (Netherlands)	0–0	(Germany) Werder Bremen
	Report

DSB Stadion, Alkmaar
Attendance: 16,800
Referee: Olegário Benquerença (Portugal)
12 April 2007
20:45

Werder Bremen (Germany)	4–1	(Netherlands) AZ
Borowski 16'; Klose 36', 62'; Diego 82'	Report	Dembélé 32'

Weserstadion, Bremen
Attendance: 35,000
Referee: Mike Riley (England)

Werder Bremen won 4–1 on aggregate.

5 April 2007
19:00

Bayer Leverkusen (Germany)	0–3	(Spain) Osasuna
	Report	Cuéllar 1'; López 71'; Webó 73'

BayArena, Leverkusen
Attendance: 22,500
Referee: Terje Hauge (Norway)
12 April 2007
20:45

Osasuna (Spain)	1–0	(Germany) Bayer Leverkusen
Juanlu 62'	Report

Estadio Reyno de Navarra, Pamplona
Attendance: 17,450
Referee: Peter Fröjdfeldt (Sweden)

Osasuna won 4–0 on aggregate.

5 April 2007
20:45

Sevilla (Spain)	2–1	(England) Tottenham Hotspur
Kanouté 19' (pen.); Kerzhakov 36'	Report	Keane 2'

Ramón Sánchez Pizjuán Stadium, Seville
Attendance: 32,738
Referee: Alain Hamer (Luxembourg)
12 April 2007
20:45

Tottenham Hotspur (England)	2–2	(Spain) Sevilla
Defoe 65'; Lennon 67'	Report	Malbranque 3' (o.g.); Kanouté 8'

White Hart Lane, London
Attendance: 35,284
Referee: Konrad Plautz (Austria)

Sevilla won 4–3 on aggregate.

5 April 2007
20:45

Espanyol (Spain)	3–2	(Portugal) Benfica
Tamudo 15'; Riera 33'; Pandiani 59'	Report	Nuno Gomes 64'; Simão 66'

Estadi Olímpic Lluís Companys, Barcelona
Attendance: 25,100
Referee: Eric Braamhaar (Netherlands)
12 April 2007
20:45

Benfica (Portugal)	0–0	(Spain) Espanyol
	Report

Estádio da Luz, Lisbon
Attendance: 51,102
Referee: Claus Bo Larsen (Denmark)

Espanyol won 3–2 on aggregate.

== Semi-finals ==
=== Summary ===
The semi-final matches were played on 26 April and 3 May 2007.

Team 1	Agg.	Team 2	1st leg	2nd leg
Espanyol (Spain)	5–1	(Germany) Werder Bremen	3–0	2–1
Osasuna (Spain)	1–2	(Spain) Sevilla	1–0	0–2

=== Matches ===
26 April 2007
20:45

Espanyol (Spain)	3–0	(Germany) Werder Bremen
Hurtado 21'; Pandiani 50'; Coro 88'	Report

Estadi Olímpic Lluís Companys, Barcelona
Attendance: 40,250
Referee: Tom Henning Øvrebø (Norway)
3 May 2007
20:45

Werder Bremen (Germany)	1–2	(Spain) Espanyol
Almeida 4'	Report	Coro 50'; Lacruz 61'

Weserstadion, Bremen
Attendance: 37,000
Referee: Bertrand Layec (France)

Espanyol won 5–1 on aggregate.

26 April 2007
20:45

Osasuna (Spain)	1–0	(Spain) Sevilla
Soldado 55'	Report

Estadio Reyno de Navarra, Pamplona
Attendance: 18,134
Referee: Eric Braamhaar (Netherlands)
3 May 2007
20:45

Sevilla (Spain)	2–0	(Spain) Osasuna
Luís Fabiano 37'; Renato 53'	Report

Ramón Sánchez Pizjuán Stadium, Seville
Attendance: 38,497
Referee: Graham Poll (England)

Sevilla won 2–1 on aggregate.

== Final ==
The final was played on 16 May 2007 at Hampden Park in Glasgow, Scotland.

16 May 2007
20:45 (19:45 UTC+1)

Espanyol (Spain)	2–2 (a.e.t.)	(Spain) Sevilla
Riera 28'; Jônatas 115'	Report	Adriano 18'; Kanouté 105'
Penalties
L. García (penalty missed); Pandiani (penalty scored); Jônatas (penalty missed); Torrejón (penalty missed)	1–3	(penalty scored) Kanouté; (penalty scored) Dragutinović; (penalty missed) Dani Alves; (penalty scored) Puerta

Hampden Park, Glasgow
Attendance: 47,602
Referee: Massimo Busacca (Switzerland)
