= 2006–07 in Portuguese football =

The 2006–07 season marked a pivotal moment in the history of Portuguese football. The national team experienced a transition, marking the departure of the so-called 'golden generation' that was spearheaded by Luis Figo. This shift in personnel coincided with the emergence of a new era, centred around the core of the Cristiano Ronaldo. Concurrently, several prominent domestic clubs were grappling with financial constraints and the outflow of talent, leading to a decline in the overall influence of the Primeira Liga. However, the fundamental structure of the Big Three remained largely intact. This period laid the foundation for the revival of Portuguese football in the 2010s.

== Events ==
- August 9, 2006 - Co Adriaanse resigns as manager of Porto
- August 16, 2006 - Jesualdo Ferreira is announced as the new manager of the champions Porto
- August 19, 2006 - Porto defeats Vitória de Setúbal 3–0 in Leiria to win the SuperCup Cândido de Oliveira with Rui Barros commanding the team
- August 23, 2006 - Courts confirm that Belenenses will play in the Primeira Liga instead of Gil Vicente due to the Mateus affair. The following days witnessed much controversy: the day the league started, it was still not known which teams would play in the major league.
- August 25-August 28, 2006 - The Primeira Liga and Liga de Honra seasons begin.
- September 1, 2006 - The Portugal national team plays its first game since the 2006 FIFA World Cup, against Denmark
- September 3, 2006 - The Taça de Portugal and the Second Division seasons begin.
- September 10, 2006 - The Terceira Divisão season begins
- September 17, 2006 - The Serie Azores of the Third Division begins in the archipelago of the Azores

== Transfer deals ==
=== Major summer transfers ===
The summer transfer window runs from the end of the previous season until 31 August.

May 13, 2006

- Adriano from Cruzeiro to Porto, €1.2M fee

May 17, 2006

- Hilário from Nacional to Chelsea, free transfer

May 21, 2006

- Diego from Porto to Werder Bremen, €6M

May 25, 2006

- Rui Costa from Milan to Benfica, free transfer

May 27, 2006

- Zé Castro from Académica to Atlético Madrid, undisclosed fee

June 2, 2006

- João Pinto from Boavista to Braga, free transfer

June 6, 2006

- Geovanni from Benfica to Cruzeiro, €1.5M

June 7, 2006

- Przemysław Kaźmierczak from Pogoń Szczecin to Boavista, on loan

June 13, 2006

- Roland Linz from Austria Wien to Boavista, undisclosed fee

June 22, 2006

- Pontus Farnerud from Strasbourg to Sporting CP, free transfer
- Kostas Katsouranis from AEK Athens to Benfica, €2M

July 4, 2006

- Carlos Paredes from Reggina to Sporting CP

July 9, 2006

- Mário Jardel from Goiás to Beira-Mar

July 11, 2006

- Laurent Robert from Benfica to Levante
- Tarik Sektioui from AZ to Porto
- Hugo Almeida from Porto to Werder Bremen

== UEFA competitions ==
=== UEFA Champions League ===
==== Porto ====
Group G
Pos	Team	Pld	W	D	L	GF	GA	GD	Pts	Qualification	ARS	POR	CSKA	HAM
1	(England) Arsenal	6	3	2	1	7	3	+4	11	Advance to knockout stage	—	2–0	0–0	3–1
2	(Portugal) Porto	6	3	2	1	9	4	+5	11	Advance to knockout stage	0–0	—	0–0	4–1
3	(Russia) CSKA Moscow	6	2	2	2	4	5	−1	8	Transfer to UEFA Cup	1–0	0–2	—	1–0
4	(Germany) Hamburger SV	6	1	0	5	7	15	−8	3		1–2	1–3	3–2	—

Source: RSSSF

All times CET

13 September 2006
20:45

Porto (Portugal)	0–0	(Russia) CSKA Moscow
	Report

Estádio do Dragão, Porto
Referee: Øvrebø (NOR)

September 26, 2006
20:45

Arsenal (England)	2–0	(Portugal) Porto
Henry 38'; Hleb 48'	Report

Emirates Stadium, London
Referee: Farina (ITA)

October 17, 2006
20:45

Porto (Portugal)	4–1	(Germany) Hamburg
Lisandro 14' 81'; Lucho 48' (pen.); Postiga 69'	Report	89' Trochowski

Estádio do Dragão, Porto
Attendance: 37,500
Referee: Hamer (LUX)

November 1, 2006
20:45

Hamburg (Germany)	1–3	(Portugal) Porto
van der Vaart 62'	Report	44' Lucho; 61' Lisandro; 87' Moraes

AOL Arena, Hamburg
Referee: Duhamel (FRA)

November 21, 2006
18:30

CSKA Moscow (Russia)	0–2	(Portugal) Porto
	Report	2' Quaresma; 61' Lucho

Lokomotiv Stadium, Moscow
Referee: Vassaras (GRE)

December 6, 2006
20:45

Porto (Portugal)	0–0	(England) Arsenal
	Report

Estádio do Dragão, Porto
Referee: Merk (GER)

===== Round of 16 =====
Team 1	Agg.	Team 2	1st leg	2nd leg
Porto (Portugal)	2–3	(England) Chelsea	1–1	1–2

February 21, 2007
20:45

Porto (Portugal)	1–1	(England) Chelsea
Meireles 12'	(Report)	16' Shevchenko

Estádio do Dragão, Porto
Referee: Busacca (SUI)

March 6, 2007
20:45

Chelsea (England)	2–1	(Portugal) Porto
Robben 48'; Ballack 78'	(Report)	15' Quaresma

Stamford Bridge, London
Attendance: 39,041
Referee: Rosetti (ITA)

==== Sporting CP ====
Group B
Pos	Team	Pld	W	D	L	GF	GA	GD	Pts	Qualification	BAY	INT	SPM	SPO
1	(Germany) Bayern Munich	6	3	3	0	10	3	+7	12	Advance to knockout stage	—	1–1	4–0	0–0
2	(Italy) Internazionale	6	3	1	2	5	5	0	10	Advance to knockout stage	0–2	—	2–1	1–0
3	(Russia) Spartak Moscow	6	1	2	3	7	11	−4	5	Transfer to UEFA Cup	2–2	0–1	—	1–1
4	(Portugal) Sporting CP	6	1	2	3	3	6	−3	5		0–1	1–0	1–3	—

Source: RSSSF

All times CET

September 12, 2006
20:45

Sporting CP (Portugal)	1–0	(Italy) Internazionale
Caneira 64'	Report

Estádio José Alvalade, Lisbon
Attendance: 30,222
Referee: Hamer (LUX)

September 27, 2006
20:45

Spartak Moscow (Russia)	1–1	(Portugal) Sporting CP
Boyarintsev 5'	Report	59' Nani

Luzhniki Stadium, Moscow
Referee: Hansson (SWE)

October 18, 2006
20:45

Sporting CP (Portugal)	0–1	(Germany) Bayern Munich
	Report	19' Schweinsteiger

Estádio José Alvalade, Lisbon
Referee: Hauge (NOR)

October 31, 2006
20:45

Bayern Munich (Germany)	0–0	(Portugal) Sporting CP
	Report

Allianz Arena, Munich
Referee: Busacca (SUI)

November 22, 2006
20:45

Internazionale (Italy)	1–0	(Portugal) Sporting CP
Crespo 36'	Report

San Siro, Milan
Referee: De Bleeckere (BEL)

December 5, 2006
20:45

Sporting CP (Portugal)	1–3	(Russia) Spartak Moscow
Bueno 31'	Report	7' Pavlyuchenko; 16' Kalynychenko; 89' Boyarinstev

Estádio José Alvalade, Lisbon
Referee: Vollquartz (DEN)

==== Benfica ====
===== 3rd Qualifying Round =====
Benfica played the 3rd qualifying round on 8 August (first leg) and 22 August (second leg), 2006, against Austria Wien and qualified to the group stage of the Champions League.

Team 1	Agg.	Team 2	1st leg	2nd leg
Austria Wien	1–4	(Portugal) Benfica	1–1	0–3

===== Group stage =====
Group F
Pos	Team	Pld	W	D	L	GF	GA	GD	Pts	Qualification	MUN	CEL	BEN	CPH
1	(England) Manchester United	6	4	0	2	10	5	+5	12	Advance to knockout stage	—	3–2	3–1	3–0
2	(Scotland) Celtic	6	3	0	3	8	9	−1	9	Advance to knockout stage	1–0	—	3–0	1–0
3	(Portugal) Benfica	6	2	1	3	7	8	−1	7	Transfer to UEFA Cup	0–1	3–0	—	3–1
4	(Denmark) Copenhagen	6	2	1	3	5	8	−3	7		1–0	3–1	0–0	—

Source: RSSSF

All times CET

September 13, 2006
20:45

Copenhagen (Denmark)	0–0	(Portugal) Benfica
	Report

Parken Stadium, Copenhagen
Attendance: 40,085
Referee: Baskakov (RUS)

September 26, 2006
20:45

Benfica (Portugal)	0–1	(England) Manchester United
	Report	60' Saha

Estádio da Luz, Lisbon
Referee: De Bleeckere (BEL)

October 17, 2006
20:45

Celtic (Scotland)	3–0	(Portugal) Benfica
Miller 56', 66'; Pearson 90'	Report

Celtic Park, Glasgow
Attendance: 58,313
Referee: Braamhaar (NED)

November 1, 2006
20:45

Benfica (Portugal)	3–0	(Scotland) Celtic
Caldwell 10' (o.g.); Nuno Gomes 22'; Karyaka 76'	Report

Estádio da Luz, Lisbon
Referee: Vassaras (GRE)

November 21, 2006
20:45

Benfica (Portugal)	3–1	(Denmark) Copenhagen
Léo 14'; Miccoli 16', 37'	Report	89' Allbäck

Estádio da Luz, Lisbon

December 6, 2006
20:45

Manchester United (England)	3–1	(Portugal) Benfica
Vidić 45+1'; Giggs 61'; Saha 75'	Report	27' Nélson

Old Trafford, Manchester

== UEFA Cup ==
Portuguese teams entered the UEFA Cup in the 1st round immediately after the two qualifying rounds. That year's teams in the UEFA Cup were Sporting de Braga, Nacional, and Vitória de Setúbal. Benfica eventually entered into the Round of 32 after achieving a 3rd-placed finish in its UEFA Champions League group.

=== First round ===
The 1st leg was played on 14 September 2006. The 2nd leg was played on 28 September 2006.

Team 1	Agg.	Team 2	1st leg	2nd leg
Sporting de Braga (Portugal)	3–2	(Italy) Chievo	2–0	1–2(aet)
Vitória de Setúbal (Portugal)	0–3	(Netherlands) Heerenveen	0–3	0–0
Rapid București (Romania)	3–1	(Portugal) Nacional	1–0	2–1(aet)

=== Group stage ===
Pos	Team	Pld	W	D	L	GF	GA	GD	Pts	Qualification	AZ	SEV	BRA	LIB	GRA
1	(Netherlands) AZ	4	3	1	0	12	5	+7	10	Advance to knockout stage	—	—	3–0	2–2	—
2	(Spain) Sevilla	4	2	1	1	7	2	+5	7	Advance to knockout stage	1–2	—	2–0	—	—
3	(Portugal) Braga	4	2	0	2	6	5	+1	6	Advance to knockout stage	—	—	—	4–0	2–0
4	(Czech Republic) Slovan Liberec	4	1	2	1	6	7	−1	5		—	0–0	—	—	4–1
5	(Switzerland) Grasshopper	4	0	0	4	3	15	−12	0		2–5	0–4	—	—	—

19 October 2006
AZ	3–0	Braga
2 November 2006
Braga	4–0	Slovan Liberec
23 November 2006
Sevilla	2–0	Braga
14 December 2006
Braga	2–0	Grasshopper

=== Round of 32 ===
The first leg was held on 14th or 15 February 2007, while the second leg was held on 22 February 2007.

Team 1	Agg.	Team 2	1st leg	2nd leg
Braga (Portugal)	2–0	(Italy) Parma^{1}	1–0	1–0
Benfica^{2} (Portugal)	3–1	(Romania) Dinamo București	1–0	2–1

^{1} On 7 February, the Italian Government ruled that Parma and Livorno's home fields did not meet requirements following riots held after an Italian Serie A match in Sicily. Livorno played its home leg behind closed doors on 14 February. Parma played its home leg behind closed doors on 22 February. ^{2} Transferred from UEFA Champions League group stage as third-place finishers in their groups.

=== Round of 16 ===
The first leg will be held on 8 March 2007, while the second leg will be held on 14 or 15 March 2007.

Team 1	Agg.	Team 2	1st leg	2nd leg
Braga (Portugal)	4–6	(England) Tottenham Hotspur	2–3	2–3
Paris Saint-Germain (France)	3–4	(Portugal) Benfica	2–1	1–3

== Honours ==
Competition	Winner
Primeira Liga	Porto
Taça de Portugal	Sporting CP
SuperCup Cândido de Oliveira	Porto
Liga de Honra	Leixões
Segunda Divisão	Freamunde
Terceira Divisão	

== National team ==
The Selecção played its first game against Denmark in September, losing to the Northern European side. After that friendly, the national team started its qualification for UEFA Euro 2008 with a draw against Finland.

Date	Venue	Opponents	Score	Competition	Scorers	Match Report
September 1, 2006	Brøndby Stadion, Brøndby (A)	Denmark	2–4	Friendly	Carvalho, Nani	UEFA.com
September 6, 2006	Olympiastadion, Helsinki (A)	Finland	1–1	ECQ	Nuno Gomes	UEFA.com
October 10, 2006	Estádio do Bessa, Porto (H)	Azerbaijan	3–0	ECQ	Ronaldo (2), Carvalho	UEFA.com
October 11, 2006	Stadion Śląski, Chorzów (A)	Poland	1–2	ECQ	Nuno Gomes	UEFA.com
November 15, 2006	Estádio Cidade de Coimbra, Coimbra (H)	Kazakhstan	3–0	ECQ	Simão (2), Ronaldo	UEFA.com
February 6, 2007	Emirates Stadium, London (N)	Brazil	2–0	Friendly	Simão, Carvalho	UEFA.com
March 24, 2007	Estádio José Alvalade, Lisbon (H)	Belgium	4–0	ECQ	Nuno Gomes, Ronaldo (2), Quaresma	UEFA.com
March 28, 2007	Stadion Crvena Zvezda, Belgrade (A)	Serbia	1–1	ECQ	Tiago	UEFA.com
June 2, 2007	King Boudouin Stadium (A)	Belgium	1–2	ECQ		

Key

- H = Home match
- A = Away match
- N = Neutral field
- F = Friendly
- ECQ = European Championship Qualifier
