= 2006–07 UEFA Cup group stage =

International football competition

The 2006–07 UEFA Cup group stage began on 19 October and ended on 14 December 2006. Forty teams were divided into eight groups, with the top three teams of each group advancing to the knockout stage.

== Teams ==
The group stage draw took place on 3 October 2006 at the UEFA headquarters in Nyon, Switzerland. The forty teams were divided into five pots of eight teams based on the UEFA club coefficient rankings.

Key to colours
Group winners, runners-up and third-placed teams advanced to round of 32

Pot 1
Team	Coeff.
(Spain) Sevilla	61.006
(England) Newcastle United	75.950
(Greece) Panathinaikos	66.587
(Italy) Parma	63.020
(Netherlands) Ajax	60.640
(Germany) Bayer Leverkusen	57.960
(Netherlands) Feyenoord	54.640
(France) Auxerre	53.757

Pot 2
Team	Coeff.
(Belgium) Club Brugge	49.981
(Switzerland) Basel	49.537
(Netherlands) AZ	48.640
(Czech Republic) Sparta Prague	44.769
(Scotland) Rangers	43.023
(Spain) Celta Vigo	43.006
(France) Paris Saint-Germain	41.757
(France) Lens	39.757

Pot 3
Team	Coeff.
(Turkey) Beşiktaş	38.634
(Italy) Palermo	36.020
(Spain) Espanyol	33.006
(Netherlands) Heerenveen	30.640
(Serbia) Partizan	30.600
(Romania) Rapid București	30.381
(Poland) Wisła Kraków	29.104
(Czech Republic) Slovan Liberec	28.769

Pot 4
Team	Coeff.
(Turkey) Fenerbahçe	28.634
Austria Wien	27.723
(Israel) Hapoel Tel Aviv	26.108
(Spain) Osasuna	25.006
(England) Blackburn Rovers	23.950
(Switzerland) Grasshopper	23.537
(Romania) Dinamo București	22.381
(Italy) Livorno	22.020

Pot 5
Team	Coeff.
(England) Tottenham Hotspur	20.950
(Israel) Maccabi Haifa	19.108
(Portugal) Braga	17.533
(France) Nancy	16.757
(Germany) Eintracht Frankfurt	15.960
(Belgium) Zulte Waregem	9.981
(Czech Republic) Mladá Boleslav	8.769
(Denmark) Odense	8.593

Notes

1. ^{TH} Title holders

== Tie-breaking criteria ==
Based on paragraph 6.06 in the UEFA regulations for the current season, if two or more teams are equal on points on completion of the group matches, the following criteria are applied to determine the rankings:

1. superior goal difference from all group matches played;
2. higher number of goals scored;
3. higher number of goals scored away;
4. higher number of wins;
5. higher number of away wins;
6. higher number of coefficient points accumulated by the club in question, as well as its association, over the previous five seasons.

== Groups ==
All times are CET, as listed by UEFA.

=== Group A ===
Pos	Team	Pld	W	D	L	GF	GA	GD	Pts	Qualification	RAN	MHA	LIV	AUX	PTZ
1	(Scotland) Rangers	4	3	1	0	8	4	+4	10	Advance to knockout stage	—	2–0	—	—	1–0
2	(Israel) Maccabi Haifa	4	2	1	1	5	4	+1	7	Advance to knockout stage	—	—	—	3–1	1–0
3	(Italy) Livorno	4	1	2	1	5	5	0	5	Advance to knockout stage	2–3	1–1	—	—	—
4	(France) Auxerre	4	1	1	2	7	7	0	4		2–2	—	0–1	—	—
5	(Serbia) Partizan	4	0	1	3	2	7	−5	1		—	—	1–1	1–4	—

19 October 2006
20:45

Livorno (Italy)	2–3	(Scotland) Rangers
Lucarelli 34' (pen.), 90'	Report	Adam 27'; Boyd 30' (pen.); Novo 35'

Stadio Armando Picchi, Livorno
Attendance: 13,199
Referee: Julián Rodríguez Santiago (Spain)
19 October 2006
18:45

Maccabi Haifa (Israel)	3–1	(France) Auxerre
Masudi 13'; Boccoli 56'; Colautti 58'	Report	Niculae 29'

Bloomfield Stadium, Tel Aviv (Note: Maccabi Haifa played their home matches at Bloomfield Stadium in Tel Aviv instead of their regular stadium, Kiryat Eliezer Stadium, Haifa.)
Attendance: 14,300
Referee: Lucílio Batista (Portugal)

2 November 2006
19:00

Partizan (Serbia)	1–1	(Italy) Livorno
Mirosavljević 70'	Report	Amelia 88'

Stadion FK Partizan, Belgrade
Attendance: 12,746
Referee: Peter Sippel (Germany)
2 November 2006
20:45

Rangers (Scotland)	2–0	(Israel) Maccabi Haifa
Novo 5'; Adam 89' (pen.)	Report

Ibrox Stadium, Glasgow
Attendance: 43,062
Referee: Costas Kapitanis (Cyprus)

23 November 2006
19:30

Auxerre (France)	2–2	(Scotland) Rangers
Jeleń 31'; Niculae 75'	Report	Novo 62'; Boyd 84'

Stade de l'Abbé-Deschamps, Auxerre
Attendance: 8,305
Referee: Jonas Eriksson (Sweden)
23 November 2006
18:45

Maccabi Haifa (Israel)	1–0	(Serbia) Partizan
Xavier 21'	Report

Bloomfield Stadium, Tel Aviv
Attendance: 13,500
Referee: Jacek Granat (Poland)

29 November 2006
20:45

Livorno (Italy)	1–1	(Israel) Maccabi Haifa
Lucarelli 20'	Report	Colautti 90+3'

Stadio Armando Picchi, Livorno
Attendance: 7,874
Referee: Pieter Vink (Netherlands)
29 November 2006
20:45

Partizan (Serbia)	1–4	(France) Auxerre
Marinković 5'	Report	Cheyrou 18'; Niculae 24'; Akalé 36'; Pieroni 82'

Stadion FK Partizan, Belgrade
Attendance: 4,121
Referee: Brage Sandmoen (Norway)

14 December 2006
20:45

Rangers (Scotland)	1–0	(Serbia) Partizan
Hutton 55'	Report

Ibrox Stadium, Glasgow
Attendance: 45,129
Referee: Ruud Bossen (Netherlands)
14 December 2006
20:45

Auxerre (France)	0–1	(Italy) Livorno
	Report	Lucarelli 59'

Stade de l'Abbé-Deschamps, Auxerre
Attendance: 4,330
Referee: Ivan Bebek (Croatia)

=== Group B ===
Pos	Team	Pld	W	D	L	GF	GA	GD	Pts	Qualification	TOT	DB	LEV	BJK	BRU
1	(England) Tottenham Hotspur	4	4	0	0	9	2	+7	12	Advance to knockout stage	—	3–1	—	—	3–1
2	(Romania) Dinamo București	4	2	1	1	6	6	0	7	Advance to knockout stage	—	—	2–1	2–1	—
3	(Germany) Bayer Leverkusen	4	1	1	2	4	5	−1	4	Advance to knockout stage	0–1	—	—	2–1	—
4	(Turkey) Beşiktaş	4	1	0	3	4	7	−3	3		0–2	—	—	—	2–1
5	(Belgium) Club Brugge	4	0	2	2	4	7	−3	2		—	1–1	1–1	—	—

19 October 2006
19:00

Beşiktaş (Turkey)	0–2	(England) Tottenham Hotspur
	Report	Ghaly 32'; Berbatov 63'

BJK İnönü Stadium, Istanbul
Attendance: 26,800
Referee: Nicolai Vollquartz (Denmark)
19 October 2006
20:45

Club Brugge (Belgium)	1–1	(Germany) Bayer Leverkusen
Clement 47'	Report	Schneider 35'

Jan Breydel Stadium, Bruges
Attendance: 17,789
Referee: Georgios Kasnaferis (Greece)

2 November 2006
21:00

Tottenham Hotspur (England)	3–1	(Belgium) Club Brugge
Berbatov 17', 73'; Keane 63'	Report	Ibrahim 14'

White Hart Lane, London
Attendance: 35,716
Referee: Alberto Undiano Mallenco (Spain)
2 November 2006
19:30

Dinamo București (Romania)	2–1	(Turkey) Beşiktaş
Cristea 21'; Niculescu 87' (pen.)	Report	Bobô 58'

Stadionul Dinamo, Bucharest
Attendance: 7,419
Referee: Darko Ceferin (Slovenia)

23 November 2006
20:30

Bayer Leverkusen (Germany)	0–1	(England) Tottenham Hotspur
	Report	Berbatov 36'

BayArena, Leverkusen
Attendance: 22,500
Referee: Martin Hansson (Sweden)
23 November 2006
20:30

Club Brugge (Belgium)	1–1	(Romania) Dinamo București
Vermant 62' (pen.)	Report	Niculescu 33'

Jan Breydel Stadium, Bruges
Attendance: 18,713
Referee: Martin Ingvarsson (Sweden)

29 November 2006
20:45

Dinamo București (Romania)	2–1	(Germany) Bayer Leverkusen
Niculescu 37', 74'	Report	Barbarez 22'

Stadionul Dinamo, Bucharest
Attendance: 8,223
Referee: João Ferreira (Portugal)
29 November 2006
20:45

Beşiktaş (Turkey)	2–1	(Belgium) Club Brugge
Akın 32'; Ricardinho 70' (pen.)	Report	Balaban 14' (pen.)

BJK İnönü Stadium, Istanbul
Attendance: 19,668
Referee: Zsolt Szabó (Hungary)

14 December 2006
20:45

Tottenham Hotspur (England)	3–1	(Romania) Dinamo București
Berbatov 16'; Defoe 39', 50'	Report	Mendy 90+1'

White Hart Lane, London
Attendance: 34,004
Referee: Bernhard Brugger (Austria)
14 December 2006
20:45

Bayer Leverkusen (Germany)	2–1	(Turkey) Beşiktaş
Schneider 78'; Barbarez 87'	Report	Ricardinho 90+1' (pen.)

BayArena, Leverkusen
Attendance: 19,500
Referee: Gianluca Paparesta (Italy)

=== Group C ===
Pos	Team	Pld	W	D	L	GF	GA	GD	Pts	Qualification	AZ	SEV	BRA	LIB	GRA
1	(Netherlands) AZ	4	3	1	0	12	5	+7	10	Advance to knockout stage	—	—	3–0	2–2	—
2	(Spain) Sevilla	4	2	1	1	7	2	+5	7	Advance to knockout stage	1–2	—	2–0	—	—
3	(Portugal) Braga	4	2	0	2	6	5	+1	6	Advance to knockout stage	—	—	—	4–0	2–0
4	(Czech Republic) Slovan Liberec	4	1	2	1	6	7	−1	5		—	0–0	—	—	4–1
5	(Switzerland) Grasshopper	4	0	0	4	3	15	−12	0		2–5	0–4	—	—	—

19 October 2006
20:15

AZ (Netherlands)	3–0	(Portugal) Braga
Arveladze 37'; Koevermans 75'; Schaars 82'	Report

DSB Stadion, Alkmaar
Attendance: 13,893
Referee: Fritz Stuchlik (Austria)
19 October 2006
21:00

Slovan Liberec (Czech Republic)	0–0	(Spain) Sevilla
	Report

Stadion u Nisy, Liberec
Attendance: 7,023
Referee: Alexandru Tudor (Romania)

2 November 2006
19:00

Grasshopper (Switzerland)	2–5	(Netherlands) AZ
Mbala Mbuta 29'; Eduardo 62'	Report	Arveladze 48'; De Zeeuw 56'; Dembélé 78', 90+5'; Martens 90+3'

Hardturm, Zürich
Attendance: 5,500
Referee: Athanassios Briakos (Greece)
2 November 2006
21:30

Braga (Portugal)	4–0	(Czech Republic) Slovan Liberec
Chaves 30'; Marcel 33'; Césinha 54' (pen.); Gama 90+1'	Report

Estádio Municipal de Braga, Braga
Attendance: 8,859
Referee: Rob Styles (England)

23 November 2006
18:15

Slovan Liberec (Czech Republic)	4–1	(Switzerland) Grasshopper
Blažek 7'; Zápotočný 21'; Papoušek 68'; Frejlach 90+1'	Report	Schwegler 9'

Stadion u Nisy, Liberec
Attendance: 6,875
Referee: Johan Verbist (Belgium)
23 November 2006
20:45

Sevilla (Spain)	2–0	(Portugal) Braga
Luís Fabiano 40'; Chevantón 76'	Report

Ramón Sánchez Pizjuán Stadium, Seville
Attendance: 28,225
Referee: Helmut Fleischer (Germany)

29 November 2006
20:45

Grasshopper (Switzerland)	0–4	(Spain) Sevilla
	Report	Dani Alves 12', 53'; Chevantón 62'; Kepa 84'

Hardturm, Zürich
Attendance: 7,300
Referee: Anton Genov (Bulgaria)
29 November 2006
20:45

AZ (Netherlands)	2–2	(Czech Republic) Slovan Liberec
Steinsson 69'; Jenner 89'	Report	Zápotočný 26'; Papoušek 85'

DSB Stadion, Alkmaar
Attendance: 15,745
Referee: Iain Brines (Scotland)

14 December 2006
20:45

Braga (Portugal)	2–0	(Switzerland) Grasshopper
Pinto 61'; Castanheira 90+1'	Report

Estádio Municipal de Braga, Braga
Attendance: 11,048
Referee: Nikolai Ivanov (Russia)
14 December 2006
20:45

Sevilla (Spain)	1–2	(Netherlands) AZ
Chevantón 52' (pen.)	Report	Arveladze 62', 90+3'

Ramón Sánchez Pizjuán Stadium, Seville
Attendance: 29,373
Referee: Tommy Skjerven (Norway)

=== Group D ===
Pos	Team	Pld	W	D	L	GF	GA	GD	Pts	Qualification	PAR	OSA	LEN	ODE	HVN
1	(Italy) Parma	4	3	0	1	6	6	0	9	Advance to knockout stage	—	0–3	—	—	2–1
2	(Spain) Osasuna	4	2	1	1	7	4	+3	7	Advance to knockout stage	—	—	—	3–1	0–0
3	(France) Lens	4	1	1	2	5	5	0	4	Advance to knockout stage	1–2	3–1	—	—	—
4	(Denmark) Odense	4	1	1	2	5	6	−1	4		1–2	—	1–1	—	—
5	(Netherlands) Heerenveen	4	1	1	2	2	4	−2	4		—	—	1–0	0–2	—

19 October 2006
20:45

Osasuna (Spain)	0–0	(Netherlands) Heerenveen
	Report

Estadio Reyno de Navarra, Pamplona
Attendance: 13,420
Referee: Damir Skomina (Slovenia)
19 October 2006
20:45

Odense (Denmark)	1–2	(Italy) Parma
Hansen 7'	Report	Dessena 41'; Budan 51'

Fionia Park, Odense
Attendance: 12,559
Referee: Serge Gumienny (Belgium)

2 November 2006
18:45

Heerenveen (Netherlands)	0–2	(Denmark) Odense
	Report	Lekić 45', 60'

Abe Lenstra Stadion, Heerenveen
Attendance: 17,500
Referee: Tony Asumaa (Finland)
2 November 2006
20:00

Lens (France)	3–1	(Spain) Osasuna
Dindane 15'; Cousin 69' (pen.); Boukari 82'	Report	Valdo 46'

Stade Félix-Bollaert, Lens
Attendance: 33,954
Referee: Gerald Lehner (Austria)

23 November 2006
20:45

Parma (Italy)	2–1	(Netherlands) Heerenveen
Budan 24', 73'	Report	Pranjić 21'

Stadio Ennio Tardini, Parma
Attendance: 3,632
Referee: Mark Halsey (England)
23 November 2006
20:45

Odense (Denmark)	1–1	(France) Lens
Grahn 58'	Report	Jemaa 87'

Fionia Park, Odense
Attendance: 7,707
Referee: Alon Yefet (Israel)

29 November 2006
20:45

Lens (France)	1–2	(Italy) Parma
Cousin 19'	Report	Dedič 77'; Paponi 90+2'

Stade Félix-Bollaert, Lens
Attendance: 32,341
Referee: Stuart Dougal (Scotland)
29 November 2006
20:45

Osasuna (Spain)	3–1	(Denmark) Odense
Puñal 29', 67'; Romeo 87'	Report	Puñal 75' (o.g.)

Estadio Reyno de Navarra, Pamplona
Attendance: 13,115
Referee: Peter Sippel (Germany)

14 December 2006
20:45

Parma (Italy)	0–3	(Spain) Osasuna
	Report	López 33', 44'; Juanfran 82'

Stadio Ennio Tardini, Parma
Attendance: 1,972
Referee: Selçuk Dereli (Turkey)
14 December 2006
20:45

Heerenveen (Netherlands)	1–0	(France) Lens
Alves 90+3'	Report

Abe Lenstra Stadion, Heerenveen
Attendance: 17,000
Referee: Costas Kapitanis (Cyprus)

=== Group E ===
Pos	Team	Pld	W	D	L	GF	GA	GD	Pts	Qualification	BLB	NAN	FEY	WIS	BSL
1	(England) Blackburn Rovers	4	3	1	0	6	1	+5	10	Advance to knockout stage	—	1–0	—	—	3–0
2	(France) Nancy	4	2	1	1	7	4	+3	7	Advance to knockout stage	—	—	3–0	2–1	—
3	(Netherlands) Feyenoord	4	1	2	1	4	5	−1	5	Advance to knockout stage	0–0	—	—	3–1	—
4	(Poland) Wisła Kraków	4	1	0	3	6	8	−2	3		1–2	—	—	—	3–1
5	(Switzerland) Basel	4	0	2	2	4	9	−5	2		—	2–2	1–1	—	—

19 October 2006
16:45

Wisła Kraków (Poland)	1–2	(England) Blackburn Rovers
Cantoro 28'	Report	Savage 56'; Bentley 90'

Stadion Wisly Krakow, Kraków
Attendance: 10,500
Referee: Stefan Johannesson (Sweden)
19 October 2006
20:15

Basel (Switzerland)	1–1	(Netherlands) Feyenoord
Eduardo 60'	Report	Huysegems 76'

St. Jakob-Park, Basel
Attendance: 15,428
Referee: Dougie McDonald (Scotland)

2 November 2006
21:00

Blackburn Rovers (England)	3–0	(Switzerland) Basel
Kerimoğlu 75'; Jeffers 89' (pen.); McCarthy 90+2'	Report

Ewood Park, Blackburn
Attendance: 13,789
Referee: Oleh Oriekhov (Ukraine)
2 November 2006
20:00

Nancy (France)	2–1	(Poland) Wisła Kraków
Kim 10'; Berenguer 55'	Report	Brożek 32'

Stade Marcel Picot, Tomblaine
Attendance: 17,509
Referee: Pavel Královec (Czech Republic)

23 November 2006
20:15

Basel (Switzerland)	2–2	(France) Nancy
Chipperfield 32'; Sterjovski 56'	Report	Kim 31'; Berenguer 34'

St. Jakob-Park, Basel
Attendance: 14,497
Referee: Bruno Paixão (Portugal)
23 November 2006
20:45

Feyenoord (Netherlands)	0–0	(England) Blackburn Rovers
	Report

De Kuip, Rotterdam
Attendance: 28,000
Referee: Knut Kircher (Germany)

30 November 2006
20:45

Nancy (France)	3–0	(Netherlands) Feyenoord
Puygrenier 22'; Kim 42'; Zerka 66' (pen.)	Report

Stade Marcel Picot, Tomblaine
Attendance: 19,048
Referee: Espen Berntsen (Norway)
30 November 2006
20:45

Wisła Kraków (Poland)	3–1	(Switzerland) Basel
Brożek 11', 83'; Jean Paulista 71'	Report	Petrić 8'

Stadion Wisly Krakow, Kraków
Attendance: 5,580
Referee: Viktor Kassai (Hungary)

13 December 2006
20:45

Blackburn Rovers (England)	1–0	(France) Nancy
Neill 90+3'	Report

Ewood Park, Blackburn
Attendance: 12,568
Referee: Gerald Lehner (Austria)
13 December 2006
20:45

Feyenoord (Netherlands)	3–1	(Poland) Wisła Kraków
Hofs 16'; De Guzmán 41'; Charisteas 67'	Report	Brożek 23'

De Kuip, Rotterdam
Attendance: 20,459
Referee: Paolo Dondarini (Italy)

=== Group F ===
Pos	Team	Pld	W	D	L	GF	GA	GD	Pts	Qualification	ESP	AJX	ZWA	PRA	AUS
1	(Spain) Espanyol	4	4	0	0	11	2	+9	12	Advance to knockout stage	—	—	6–2	—	1–0
2	(Netherlands) Ajax	4	2	1	1	6	2	+4	7	Advance to knockout stage	0–2	—	—	—	3–0
3	(Belgium) Zulte Waregem	4	2	0	2	9	11	−2	6	Advance to knockout stage	—	0–3	—	3–1	—
4	(Czech Republic) Sparta Prague	4	1	1	2	2	5	−3	4		0–2	0–0	—	—	—
5	Austria Wien	4	0	0	4	1	9	−8	0		—	—	1–4	0–1	—

19 October 2006
19:30

Austria Wien	1–4	(Belgium) Zulte Waregem
Lasnik 22'	Report	Matthys 33', 56', 69'; Vandendriessche 90'

Ernst-Happel-Stadion, Vienna
Attendance: 11,100
Referee: Kristinn Jakobsson (Iceland)
19 October 2006
20:15

Sparta Prague (Czech Republic)	0–2	(Spain) Espanyol
	Report	L. García 17' (pen.); Riera 85'

Generali Arena, Prague
Attendance: 11,020
Referee: Howard Webb (England)

2 November 2006
20:30

Zulte Waregem (Belgium)	3–1	(Czech Republic) Sparta Prague
Roussel 4'; Meert 17'; Řepka 72' (o.g.)	Report	Lustrinelli 85'

Jules Ottenstadion, Ghent
Attendance: 7,542
Referee: Zsolt Szabó (Hungary)
2 November 2006
20:45

Ajax (Netherlands)	3–0	Austria Wien
Huntelaar 35', 68'; Manucharyan 65'	Report

Amsterdam Arena, Amsterdam
Attendance: 32,285
Referee: Sorin Corpodean (Romania)

23 November 2006
18:30

Sparta Prague (Czech Republic)	0–0	(Netherlands) Ajax
	Report

Generali Arena, Prague
Attendance: 12,225
Referee: Hervé Piccirillo (France)
23 November 2006
21:30

Espanyol (Spain)	6–2	(Belgium) Zulte Waregem
Coro 9'; Pandiani 14', 83'; L. García 19', 27' (pen.), 73'	Report	Matthys 17'; D'Haene 62'

Estadi Olímpic Lluís Companys, Barcelona
Attendance: 9,250
Referee: Cristian Balaj (Romania)

30 November 2006
20:45

Ajax (Netherlands)	0–2	(Spain) Espanyol
	Report	Pandiani 36'; Coro 78'

Amsterdam Arena, Amsterdam
Attendance: 41,248
Referee: Paolo Bertini (Italy)
30 November 2006
20:45

Austria Wien	0–1	(Czech Republic) Sparta Prague
	Report	Řepka 11'

Ernst-Happel-Stadion, Vienna
Attendance: 8,600
Referee: Romans Lajuks (Latvia)

13 December 2006
20:45

Espanyol (Spain)	1–0	Austria Wien
Pandiani 57'	Report

Estadi Olímpic Lluís Companys, Barcelona
Attendance: 5,575
Referee: Krzysztof Slupik (Poland)
13 December 2006
20:45

Zulte Waregem (Belgium)	0–3	(Netherlands) Ajax
	Report	Huntelaar 4', 57'; Heitinga 83'

Jules Ottenstadion, Ghent
Attendance: 11,603
Referee: Edo Trivković (Croatia)

=== Group G ===
Pos	Team	Pld	W	D	L	GF	GA	GD	Pts	Qualification	PAN	PSG	HTA	RAP	MLA
1	(Greece) Panathinaikos	4	2	1	1	3	4	−1	7	Advance to knockout stage	—	—	2–0	0–0	—
2	(France) Paris Saint-Germain	4	1	2	1	6	4	+2	5	Advance to knockout stage	4–0	—	2–4	—	—
3	(Israel) Hapoel Tel Aviv	4	1	2	1	7	7	0	5	Advance to knockout stage	—	—	—	2–2	1–1
4	(Romania) Rapid București	4	0	4	0	3	3	0	4		—	0–0	—	—	1–1
5	(Czech Republic) Mladá Boleslav	4	0	3	1	2	3	−1	3		0–1	0–0	—	—	—

19 October 2006
18:00

Panathinaikos (Greece)	2–0	(Israel) Hapoel Tel Aviv
Hen 47' (o.g.); Romero 64'	Report

Olympic Stadium, Athens
Attendance: 0 (Note: Spectrators not allowed because of riots on previous Panathinaikos home game.)
Referee: Eduardo Iturralde González (Spain)
19 October 2006
20:00

Rapid București (Romania)	0–0	(France) Paris Saint-Germain
	Report

Stadionul Giulești-Valentin Stănescu, Bucharest
Attendance: 10,900
Referee: Nikolai Ivanov (Russia)

2 November 2006
16:30

Hapoel Tel Aviv (Israel)	2–2	(Romania) Rapid București
Ogbonna 10'; Badir 33'	Report	Moldovan 14'; Buga 53'

Bloomfield Stadium, Tel Aviv
Attendance: 6,106
Referee: Vladimír Hrinák (Slovakia)
2 November 2006
20:15

Mladá Boleslav (Czech Republic)	0–1	(Greece) Panathinaikos
	Report	Salpingidis 64'

Městský stadion, Mladá Boleslav
Attendance: 4,280
Referee: Alan Kelly (Republic of Ireland)

23 November 2006
19:15

Rapid București (Romania)	1–1	(Czech Republic) Mladá Boleslav
Constantin 52'	Report	Rajnoch 42'

Stadionul Giulești-Valentin Stănescu, Bucharest
Attendance: 6,600
Referee: Stefan Messner (Austria)
23 November 2006
20:45

Paris Saint-Germain (France)	2–4	(Israel) Hapoel Tel Aviv
Frau 14'; Pauleta 25'	Report	Tuama 2', 6'; Badir 44'; Barda 57'

Parc des Princes, Paris
Attendance: 22,836
Referee: Michael Weiner (Germany)

30 November 2006
20:45

Mladá Boleslav (Czech Republic)	0–0	(France) Paris Saint-Germain
	Report

Městský stadion, Mladá Boleslav
Attendance: 4,840
Referee: Novo Panić (Bosnia and Herzegovina)
30 November 2006
20:45

Panathinaikos (Greece)	0–0	(Romania) Rapid București
	Report

Olympic Stadium, Athens
Attendance: 18,043
Referee: Matteo Trefoloni (Italy)

13 December 2006
20:45

Paris Saint-Germain (France)	4–0	(Greece) Panathinaikos
Pauleta 29', 47'; Kalou 52', 54'	Report

Parc des Princes, Paris
Attendance: 25,160
Referee: Carlos Megía Dávila (Spain)
13 December 2006
20:45

Hapoel Tel Aviv (Israel)	1–1	(Czech Republic) Mladá Boleslav
Barda 27'	Report	Kysela 39'

Bloomfield Stadium, Tel Aviv
Attendance: 7,889
Referee: Florian Meyer (Germany)

=== Group H ===
Pos	Team	Pld	W	D	L	GF	GA	GD	Pts	Qualification	NEW	CEL	FEN	PAL	EIN
1	(England) Newcastle United	4	3	1	0	4	1	+3	10	Advance to knockout stage	—	2–1	1–0	—	—
2	(Spain) Celta Vigo	4	1	2	1	4	4	0	5	Advance to knockout stage	—	—	1–0	—	1–1
3	(Turkey) Fenerbahçe	4	1	1	2	5	4	+1	4	Advance to knockout stage	—	—	—	3–0	2–2
4	(Italy) Palermo	4	1	1	2	3	6	−3	4		0–1	1–1	—	—	—
5	(Germany) Eintracht Frankfurt	4	0	3	1	4	5	−1	3		0–0	—	—	1–2	—

19 October 2006
18:15

Eintracht Frankfurt (Germany)	1–2	(Italy) Palermo
Streit 45+1'	Report	Brienza 50'; Zaccardo 88'

Commerzbank-Arena, Frankfurt
Attendance: 45,000
Referee: Alon Yefet (Israel)
19 October 2006
21:00

Newcastle United (England)	1–0	(Turkey) Fenerbahçe
Sibierski 79'	Report

St James' Park, Newcastle
Attendance: 30,035
Referee: Grzegorz Gilewski (Poland)

2 November 2006
20:45

Palermo (Italy)	0–1	(England) Newcastle United
	Report	Luque 37'

Stadio Renzo Barbera, Palermo
Attendance: 16,904
Referee: Jaroslav Jára (Czech Republic)
2 November 2006
21:00

Celta Vigo (Spain)	1–1	(Germany) Eintracht Frankfurt
Perera 11'	Report	Huber 17'

Balaídos, Vigo
Attendance: 9,372
Referee: Stuart Dougal (Scotland)

23 November 2006
20:45

Newcastle United (England)	2–1	(Spain) Celta Vigo
Sibierski 37'; Taylor 86'	Report	Canobbio 9'

St James' Park, Newcastle
Attendance: 25,079
Referee: Dick van Egmond (Netherlands)
23 November 2006
19:00

Fenerbahçe (Turkey)	3–0	(Italy) Palermo
Appiah 20'; Lugano 62'; Tuncay 83'	Report

Şükrü Saracoğlu Stadium, Istanbul
Attendance: 39,071
Referee: Lucílio Batista (Portugal)

30 November 2006
20:45

Celta Vigo (Spain)	1–0	(Turkey) Fenerbahçe
Canobbio 77'	Report

Balaídos, Vigo
Attendance: 7,666
Referee: Paul Allaerts (Belgium)
30 November 2006
20:45

Eintracht Frankfurt (Germany)	0–0	(England) Newcastle United
	Report

Commerzbank-Arena, Frankfurt
Attendance: 47,000
Referee: Pedro Proença (Portugal)

13 December 2006
20:45

Palermo (Italy)	1–1	(Spain) Celta Vigo
Tedesco 70'	Report	Baiano 59'

Stadio Renzo Barbera, Palermo
Attendance: 10,222
Referee: Craig Thomson (Scotland)
13 December 2006
20:45

Fenerbahçe (Turkey)	2–2	(Germany) Eintracht Frankfurt
Tuncay 64'; Şentürk 83'	Report	Takahara 7', 52'

Şükrü Saracoğlu Stadium, Istanbul
Attendance: 44,123
Referee: Jan Wegereef (Netherlands)
