= Calum Davenport =

English footballer

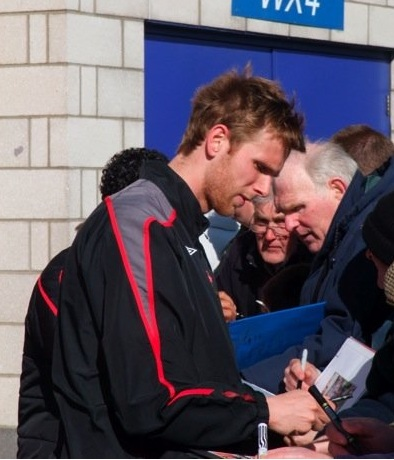
- Davenport signing autographs while on loan to Sunderland in 2009

Personal information
- Full name: Calum Ray Paul Davenport
- Date of birth: 1 January 1983 (age 43)
- Place of birth: Bedford, England
- Height: 6 ft 4 in (1.93 m)
- Position: Centre back

Youth career
- 2000–2001: Coventry City

Senior career*
Years	Team	Apps	(Gls)
2001–2004	Coventry City	75	(3)
2004–2007	Tottenham Hotspur	15	(1)
2004	→ West Ham United (loan)	10	(0)
2005	→ Southampton (loan)	7	(0)
2005	→ Norwich City (loan)	15	(1)
2007–2010	West Ham United	13	(1)
2008	→ Watford (loan)	1	(0)
2009	→ Sunderland (loan)	8	(0)
2010–2012	Wootton Blue Cross		
2014–2015	Elstow Abbey		
2021	Tavistock	5	(0)

International career
2001	England U19	1	(0)
2002	England U20	1	(0)
2004–2005	England U21	8	(0)
- * Club domestic league appearances and goals

Calum Ray Paul Davenport (born 1 January 1983) is an English former professional footballer who last played for Tavistock. During his career he has played for Coventry City, Tottenham Hotspur, West Ham United, Southampton, Norwich City, Watford, Sunderland, Wootton Blue Cross and Elstow Abbey. He played as a defender.

== Club career ==
=== Coventry City ===
Davenport joined Coventry City as a trainee in August 2000. He made his debut, in the final game of the 2000–01, a 0–0 draw against Bradford City, the season which saw the club relegated from the Premier League. It was not until the 2002–03 season that he became a regular first team player, earning the accolade of Young Player of the Year. During the 2003–04 season he gained another accolade, winning the Player of the Year award. He made 84 appearances for Coventry City in all competitions, scoring three goals.

=== Tottenham Hotspur ===
Davenport moved to Tottenham in August 2004 for a fee of £1.3 million. While at Spurs, Davenport had short loan spells at West Ham, Southampton and Norwich City. After returning to Tottenham in January 2006, he made his Premier League debut in the 2–1 home defeat to Manchester United in April 2006. He was the subject of transfer talk during the 2006 close season but remained at Spurs following a series of injuries to other defenders in pre-season. Davenport scored his first league goal for Tottenham on 17 December 2006, being the first goal in a 2–1 victory away to Manchester City, scored from a Tom Huddlestone free-kick. However, since joining Tottenham in 2004, he had struggled to establish himself in the first team and in January 2007, transferred to West Ham.

Davenport made twenty appearances for Tottenham in all competitions, scoring one goal. While on loan, he made ten appearances for West Ham, twelve appearances for Southampton and 16 appearances for Norwich.

=== West Ham United ===
Davenport joined West Ham United for an undisclosed fee, reported to be £3 million, on 18 January 2007. He signed a three-and-a-half-year contract. He made his first start in his second spell for the club two days later in a 2–2 draw against Newcastle United. He had a goal disallowed during this match by referee Uriah Rennie.

On 18 January 2008, he joined Championship side Watford on a month's loan, with a view to a permanent deal. Watford manager Aidy Boothroyd had previously been interested in signing Davenport when he was at Tottenham, and he was to provide cover for Danny Shittu whilst he was at the African Cup of Nations. Davenport made his debut against Charlton Athletic on 19 January 2008, but had to be substituted before half-time after a collision with teammate Darius Henderson. He was stretchered off and taken to hospital, where he spent a number of days and was diagnosed with a fracture to a bone in his neck. His injury meant the loan deal was cancelled.

After a lengthy spell on the sidelines Davenport returned to competitive action for the start of the 2008-09 campaign. Injuries meant he found himself in the starting eleven against Wigan Athletic on the opening day. Davenport took his chance in the first team, impressing many critics with both his defending and goal threat from set pieces. He scored his first goal for The Hammers against Blackburn Rovers on 30 August 2008 when he headed in Julien Faubert's corner. On 2 February 2009 he joined Premier League club Sunderland on loan until the end of the 2008–09 season. He made eight appearances for Sunderland. Davenport returned to West Ham for the start of the 2009–10 season but in August was involved in a stabbing incident. He did not play again for West Ham and in March 2010 his contract was terminated by mutual consent. He played fourteen games in all competitions for West Ham scoring one goal. After being released by West Ham, Davenport joined Nottingham Forest on trial during the club's 2010 pre-season.

=== Leeds United ===
In August 2010, Davenport started training with Leeds United. He started a trial period which was later confirmed by manager Simon Grayson. In September 2010 Davenport returned home to think over his options. On 8 September 2010, Grayson revealed that Leeds were still interested in the player and were awaiting Davenport to think over his future.

=== Wootton Blue Cross ===
In September 2010 Davenport signed for United Counties team Wootton Blue Cross in order to gain some match fitness before returning to the professional ranks and made his debut in a 4–0 defeat to Bourne Town.

=== Tavistock AFC ===
On 21 July 2021 it was announced that Davenport had signed for Tavistock who play in the Western League Premier Division. On joining the Lambs, Davenport said: "My only focus at the minute is to get fit again and see where that leads. I thank Stuart [Stuart Henderson, Tavistock AFC's manager] and everyone at Tavistock for the opportunity and I hope I can help the club achieve its goal of promotion from the Western League." He made five league appearances during the 2021-22 season, in which Tavistock were promoted to the Southern League as league champions.

== International career ==
Davenport played for the England national team at under-17, under-19 and under-21 levels.

== Stabbing ==
In the early hours of 22 August 2009, Davenport and his mother were stabbed at her home in Kempston, Bedfordshire. Davenport was stabbed in the legs, lost 50% of the blood from his body and underwent emergency surgery for injuries described as serious. Two men were arrested the same day in connection with the stabbings. At Bedford Magistrates Court, on 24 August 25-year-old Worrell Whitehurst, the boyfriend of Davenport's sister, was remanded in custody charged with grievous bodily harm with intent in connection with the attack on Davenport, and with assault occasioning actual bodily harm to his mother; the second man was released on bail pending further inquiries. On 12 July 2010, Whitehurst was jailed for six years, for the attack on Davenport, after he had admitted causing grievous bodily harm with intent. He also admitted a charge of unlawfully wounding Davenport's mother.

=== Threat to career ===
Due to the nature of the injury, his career was believed to be under threat. On 16 October, Gianfranco Zola reported that Davenport had returned to Chadwell Heath for light training with the team following his release from the hospital. His contract was terminated by mutual consent in March 2010.

=== Charges and court hearings ===
On 28 October 2009, Davenport was charged with assault on his sister, Cara Davenport, in an incident prior to that in which he was stabbed. On 10 November 2009, Davenport appeared before Bedford magistrates court charged with assault occasioning actual bodily harm. He pleaded not guilty and was bailed on the condition that he has no contact with his sister. During a hearing in December 2009, the case was committed to Luton Crown Court with the plea and directions hearing due on 25 January 2010. The magistrates court was told that he would plead not guilty. On 25 January, Davenport pleaded not guilty to the charge at Luton Crown Court and the case was adjourned. On 1 July, Davenport was cleared of all charges in regard to the alleged assault on his sister.

On 18 March 2015, Davenport was arrested by Bedfordshire Police on suspicion of assault after playing in a local league match while playing for Elstow Abbey Football Club against Cranfield United. On 22 March, Davenport was expelled from the club following the incident which had occurred in the changing room.

== Later career ==
In 2019, Davenport was running football coaching for children in Plymouth.
