= Gerald Lehner (referee) =

Austrian football referee (1968–2016)

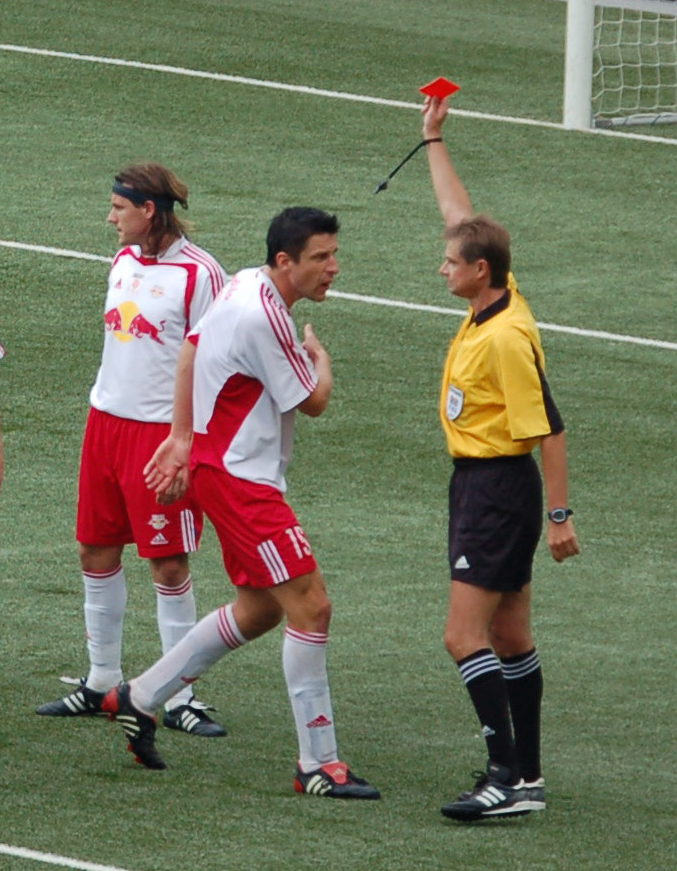
- Lehner showing Thomas Linke of FC Red Bull Salzburg a red card in a 2005 match against FK Austria Wien
- Full name: Gerald Lehner
- Born: 12 March 1968
- Died: 2 September 2016 (aged 48)
- Other occupation: Plant Technician

Domestic
Years	League	Role
1995–2008	Bundesliga	Referee
2007	Russian Premier League	Referee
2008	First League	Referee

International
Years	League	Role
2002–2008	FIFA listed	Referee

Gerald Lehner (12 March 1968 – 2 September 2016) was an Austrian football referee. Normally he worked as a plant technician.

Lehner was an Austrian Football Association (Österreichische Fußball-Bundesliga) referee from 1 July 1995 and a FIFA referee from 1 January 2002. Lehner retired from referring in 2008 for health reasons, before dying at the age of 48 on 2 September 2016.

== Career ==
=== Other countries ===
On 17 June 2007, Lehner refereed the match between FC Moscow and Spartak Moscow in the Russian Premier League. On 15 March 2008, he refereed the match between Litex Lovech and Levski Sofia.

=== International ===
Lehner officiated two matches in the 2006 UEFA European Under-21 Football Championship in Portugal.
