= Jônatas (footballer, born 1982) =

Brazilian footballer

Personal information
- Full name: Jônatas Domingos
- Date of birth: July 29, 1982 (age 44)
- Place of birth: Fortaleza, Brazil
- Height: 1.81 m (5 ft 11 in)
- Position: Midfielder

Youth career
- 2001–2003: Flamengo

Senior career*
Years	Team	Apps	(Gls)
2002–2009	Flamengo	115	(7)
2006–2008	→ Espanyol (loan)	29	(2)
2009	Botafogo	18	(0)
2011	Figueirense	11	(0)
2013	Boavista	0	(0)
2014	Icasa	2	(0)

International career
2006	Brazil	0	(0)
- * Club domestic league appearances and goals

Jônatas Domingos (born July 29, 1982), or simply Jônatas, is a Brazilian former professional footballer who played as a midfielder.

== Career ==
Jônatas was born in Fortaleza, Ceará. He came from Flamengo's youth team and played professionally for the club from 2002 until 2006.

Flamengo predicted a successful future for Jônatas if he was able to stop committing foolish fouls and complaining about referees' decisions. This was the case and the player was awarded with both his first Brazil call up (for a friendly against Norway in August 2006 which also happened to be coach Dunga's debut with the squad) and a move to European club Espanyol with whom he signed a three-year contract as of August 2006. In May 2007, he scored an equalizer while his team was playing with ten men against Sevilla deep into extra time to take the UEFA Cup final to penalties, but subsequently missed his kick as Sevilla went on to become only the second team after Real Madrid to retain the trophy.

In December 2006, Jônatas's father José Lourenço de Souza was kidnapped, after Robinho's family.

== Career statistics ==
As of December 5, 2011

Appearances and goals by club, season and competition
Club	Season	Campeonato Carioca		Série A		Copa do Brasil		Copa Libertadores		Copa Sudamericana		Total	
Club	Season	Apps	Goals	Apps	Goals	Apps	Goals	Apps	Goals	Apps	Goals	Apps	Goals
Flamengo	2002	1	0	0	0							1	0
Flamengo	2003			35	3	5	0			2	0	42	3
Flamengo	2004	11	2	24	1	7	0					42	3
Flamengo	2005	12	1	33	2	5	0					50	3
Flamengo	2006	7	1	10	1	11	1					28	3
Flamengo	2008	10	0	13	0			2	0			25	0
Flamengo	2009	9	1									9	1
Flamengo	Total	50	5	115	7	28	1	2	0	2	0	197	13
Botafogo	2009			18	0					4	0	22	0

== Honours ==
Flamengo

- Taça Guanabara: 2004, 2008
- Taça Rio: 2009
- Rio de Janeiro State League: 2004, 2008, 2009
- Copa do Brasil: 2006
