= Costas Kapitanis =

Cypriot football referee (born 1964)

- Born: 21 May 1964 (age 62); Larnaca, Cyprus

Domestic
Years	League	Role

International
Years	League	Role
1996–	FIFA listed	Referee

Costas Kapitanis (born 21 May 1964 in Larnaca, Cyprus) is a former Cypriot professional football referee. He was a full international for FIFA since 1996. He was appointed on the 1999 FIFA U-17 World Championship and refereed some UEFA Champions League matches.
