= Karel D'Haene =

Belgian footballer

Personal information
- Full name: Karel D'Haene
- Date of birth: 5 September 1980 (age 46)
- Place of birth: Kortrijk, Belgium
- Height: 1.81 m (5 ft 11 in)
- Position: Defender

Youth career
- KSV Waregem

Senior career*
Years	Team	Apps	(Gls)
1997–2000	KSV Waregem		
2000–2003	Antwerp	59	(1)
2003–2005	Trabzonspor	44	(1)
2005–2006	Manisaspor	26	(2)
2006–2016	Zulte Waregem	271	(15)
- * Club domestic league appearances and goals

Karel D'Haene (born September 5, 1980) is a Belgian retired professional football player who last played for S.V. Zulte Waregem as a defender. He helped Trabzonspor win the 2003–04 Turkish Cup.
