= Luis García (footballer, born 1981) =

Spanish footballer and manager

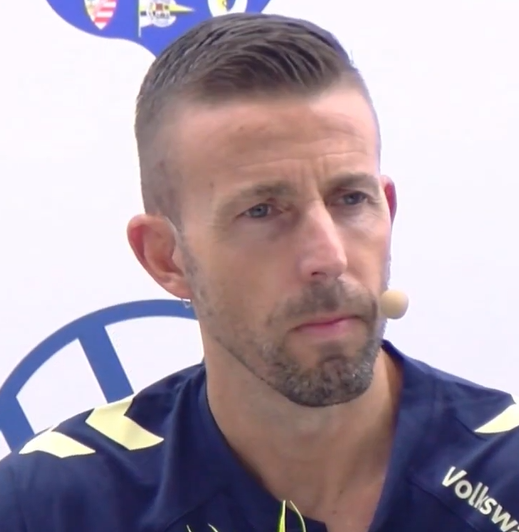
- García in 2025

Personal information
- Full name: Luis García Fernández
- Date of birth: 6 February 1981 (age 45)
- Place of birth: Oviedo, Spain
- Height: 1.80 m (5 ft 11 in)
- Positions: Striker; winger

Team information
- Current team: Mallorca (manager)

Youth career
- 1991–1996: Oviedo
- 1996: La Braña
- 1996–2000: Real Madrid

Senior career*
Years	Team	Apps	(Gls)
2000–2001	Real Madrid C	24	(14)
2001–2003	Real Madrid B	67	(32)
2003–2004	Murcia	38	(11)
2004–2005	Mallorca	37	(11)
2005–2011	Espanyol	220	(47)
2011–2014	Zaragoza	60	(8)
2012–2013	→ UANL (loan)	28	(5)
2014–2019	Eupen	151	(27)
Total		625	(155)

International career
2007–2008	Spain	7	(0)

Managerial career
- 2019–2022: Damm (youth)
- 2022–2023: Internacional
- 2023: Espanyol
- 2023–2024: Qatar (assistant)
- 2024–2025: Qatar
- 2025–2026: Las Palmas
- 2026–: Mallorca
- * Club domestic league appearances and goals

Luis García Fernández (Spanish pronunciation: [ˈlwis ɣaɾˈθi.a feɾˈnandeθ]; born 6 February 1981) is a Spanish former professional footballer, currently manager of Segunda División club Mallorca. Mainly a striker, he could also operate as a winger.

Over nine seasons, he amassed La Liga totals of 329 matches and 73 goals, mainly with Espanyol with whom he won one Copa del Rey and reached the 2007 UEFA Cup final. He also spent five in years in Belgium at the service of Eupen.

García earned seven caps for Spain in the late 2000s. He worked as a manager after retiring, notably being in charge of Espanyol and the Qatar national team.

== Club career ==
=== Real Madrid ===
García was born in Oviedo, Asturias. After representing three clubs as a youth he began his senior career with his last one, Real Madrid, first appearing with its C team then progressing in 2001 to Castilla in the Segunda División B.

On 8 January 2003, García played his only official game for the main squad, as a late substitute for Esteban Cambiasso in the 3–3 draw away to Terrassa in the round of 16 of the Copa del Rey.

=== Murcia ===
Released by Madrid in 2003, García joined Real Murcia, making his La Liga debut on 31 August and scoring a penalty in a 1–1 away draw against Celta de Vigo. He finished his first season with 11 goals and appeared in all the matches, although the side would be relegated; on 16 May 2004, he netted twice in a 2–1 fruitless home win over his former employers.

=== Espanyol ===
The following season, García produced similar numbers at Mallorca, who barely avoided relegation after ranking 17th and, in summer 2005, signed a five-year contract with Espanyol, playing competitive 48 games in his debut campaign and adding 15 goals, including a brace in the 2006 Spanish Cup final, a 4–1 defeat of Real Zaragoza. In the ensuing summer, he extended his link until 2012.

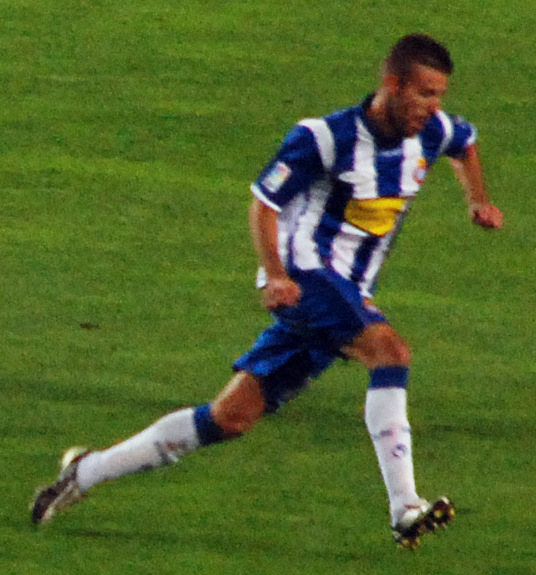
García playing for Espanyol in October 2008

García, forming a formidable attacking partnership at the Catalans with youth graduate Raúl Tamudo (the pair combined for 68 league goals from 2005 to 2008), contributed five goals during their 2006–07 runner-up run in the UEFA Cup, including a hat-trick in a 23 November 2006 group stage 6–2 home win against Zulte Waregem. However, in the May final, he missed his penalty shootout attempt in a final loss to fellow Spaniards Sevilla.

García was an everpresent figure for Espanyol until the end of his tenure, never making less than 36 appearances and scoring an average of seven goals, 13 alone in 2007–08. After the arrival in January 2010 of Argentine Dani Osvaldo, he operated almost exclusively as a winger.

=== Zaragoza ===
On 31 August 2011 – the last day of the summer transfer window – the 30-year-old García moved to Zaragoza on a three-year deal. On 18 September, he scored twice against his former team and also missed a penalty kick in a 2–1 home victory. He would, however, only manage two in the other 33 fixtures of the season he appeared in (2,297 minutes of action), with the Aragonese again narrowly avoiding top-flight relegation.

García arrived to Monterrey on 5 July 2012 accompanied by his agent, to kickstart negotiations with Liga MX side Tigres UANL. On 15 September, he scored twice against Cruz Azul for a 2–0 win at the Estadio Universitario and, in two games in March of the following year, contributed one goal each in 2–1 wins over San Luis and Puebla.

=== Eupen ===
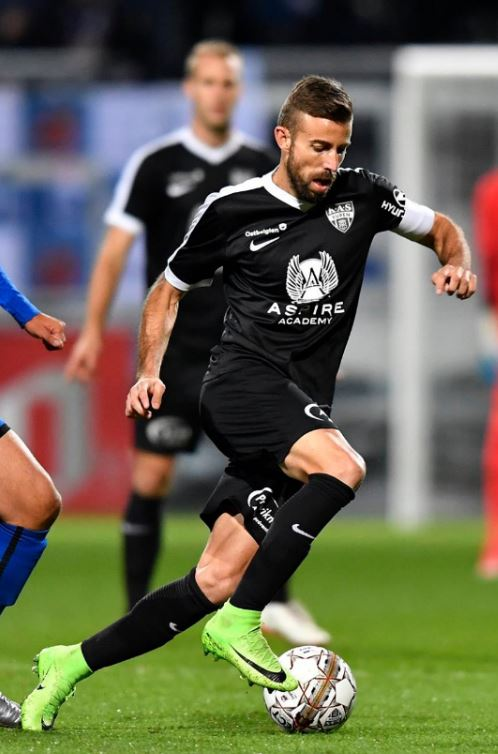
García in action for Eupen in 2017

In July 2014, García signed a two-year contract with Belgian Second Division team Eupen, joining a host of compatriots including manager Tintín Márquez. He became captain of the Kehrwegstadion club, and signed for two more years after their promotion in June 2016.

García was a key player over three Pro League seasons until his retirement in April 2019. The previous 28 October, he scored to open a 2–1 home win over Anderlecht.

== International career ==
After a remarkable 2006–07 with Espanyol, García got his first callup for Spain, under manager Luis Aragonés, appearing in an UEFA Euro 2008 qualifier against Latvia in Riga on 2 June 2007.

== Coaching career ==
Immediately after retiring, García began working as a coach, being in charge of Damm's youths. In August 2022, after Real Madrid acquired RSC Internacional who became their third team, he was appointed manager.

García moved straight to the top tier on 3 April 2023, taking over another club he represented as a player, Espanyol. On his debut five days later, the team lost 2–1 at home to Athletic Bilbao. They were relegated as 19th, thus returning to Segunda División after two years. They started the following season strongly, winning four of their first five matches; however, after just three wins in the following nine fixtures, he was dismissed.

In December 2023, García joined the Qatar national side as Márquez's assistant. One year later, after a series of poor performances during the 2026 FIFA World Cup qualifying campaign, mainly a 5–0 away loss against the United Arab Emirates, he took over from the latter.

García himself was sacked on 30 April 2025, following a disappointing campaign in the 26th Arabian Gulf Cup and the World Cup qualifiers, finishing bottom of the group in the former tournament. He was replaced by another Spaniard, Julen Lopetegui.

On 7 June 2025, García agreed to a one-year contract at Las Palmas. He left in June 2026 after missing out on promotion in the play-offs, and took over at fellow second-tier Mallorca on the same day.

== Career statistics ==
=== Club ===
Appearances and goals by club, season and competition
Club	Season	League			National cup		Continental		Other		Total	
Club	Season	Division	Apps	Goals	Apps	Goals	Apps	Goals	Apps	Goals	Apps	Goals
Real Madrid C	2001–02	Tercera División	24	14	–		–		–		24	14
Real Madrid B	2001–02	Segunda División B	34	15	–		–		6 (Note: Appearances in Segunda División B play-offs)	5	40	20
Real Madrid B	2002–03	Segunda División B	33	17	–		–		–		33	17
Real Madrid B	Total		67	32	0	0	0	0	6	5	73	37
Murcia	2003–04	La Liga	38	11	1	0	–		–		39	11
Mallorca	2004–05	La Liga	37	11	2	0	–		–		39	11
Espanyol	2005–06	La Liga	36	10	4	3	8	2	–		48	15
Espanyol	2006–07	La Liga	36	10	2	1	13	5	2	0	53	16
Espanyol	2007–08	La Liga	37	13	4	2	–		–		41	15
Espanyol	2008–09	La Liga	37	5	4	0	–		–		41	5
Espanyol	2009–10	La Liga	36	3	2	0	–		–		38	3
Espanyol	2010–11	La Liga	37	6	3	1	–		–		40	7
Espanyol	2011–12	La Liga	1	0	0	0	–		–		1	0
Espanyol	Total		220	47	19	7	21	7	2	0	262	61
Zaragoza	2011–12	La Liga	34	4	2	0	–		–		36	4
Zaragoza	2012–13	La Liga	–		–		–		–		–	
Zaragoza	2013–14	Segunda División	26	4	0	0	–		–		26	4
Zaragoza	Total		60	8	2	0	0	0	0	0	62	8
Tigres (loan)	2012–13	Liga MX	28	5	0	0	2 (Note: Appearances in North American Champions League)	0	–		30	5
Eupen	2014–15	Belgian Second Division	34	4	2	0	–		6 (Note: Appearances in Belgian Second Division promotion play-offs)	2	42	6
Eupen	2015–16	Belgian Second Division	30	6	2	0	–		–		32	6
Eupen	2016–17	Belgian Pro League	28	3	4	2	–		9 (Note: Appearances in Belgian Pro League Europa League play-offs)	4	41	9
Eupen	2017–18	Belgian Pro League	29	6	2	0	–		3	1	34	7
Eupen	2018–19	Belgian Pro League	30	8	0	0	–		5	0	35	8
Eupen	Total		151	27	10	2	0	0	23	7	184	36
Career total			625	155	34	9	23	7	31	7	713	183

=== International ===
Appearances and goals by national team and year
National team	Year	Apps	Goals
Spain	2007	6	0
Spain	2008	1	0
Total		7	0

== Managerial statistics ==
As of 21 November 2026

Managerial record by team and tenure
Team	Nat	From	To	Record								Ref
Team	Nat	From	To	G	W	D	L	GF	GA	GD	Win %	Ref
Internacional	(Spain)	15 July 2022	4 April 2023	27	19	4	4	68	25	+43	70.37	
Espanyol	(Spain)	4 April 2023	5 November 2023	26	10	7	9	45	41	+4	38.46	
Qatar	(Qatar)	11 December 2024	30 April 2025	5	1	2	2	9	8	+1	20.00	
Las Palmas	(Spain)	7 June 2025	22 June 2026	45	20	14	11	59	45	+14	44.44	
Mallorca	(Spain)	22 June 2026	Present	15	7	6	2	21	11	+10	46.67	
Total				118	57	33	28	202	130	+72	48.31	—

== Honours ==
Espanyol

- Copa del Rey: 2005–06
- UEFA Cup runner-up: 2006–07
