= 2010–11 Sevilla FC season =

104th season in existence of Sevilla FC

Sevilla
2010–11 season
- President: José María del Nido
- Head coach: Antonio Álvarez (until 27 September); Gregorio Manzano (from 27 September)
- La Liga: 5th
- Copa del Rey: Semi-finals
- Supercopa de España: Runners-up
- UEFA Champions League: Play-off round
- UEFA Europa League: Round of 32
- Top goalscorer: League: Álvaro Negredo (20); All: Álvaro Negredo (26)
Home colours	Away colours	Third colours

The 2010–11 Spanish football season is Sevilla Fútbol Club's tenth consecutive season in La Liga. The team manager for the previous season, Antonio Álvarez, continued on the role until the 2–0 defeat against Hércules on 26 September 2010. After the match, Gregorio Manzano was appointed manager, assisted by former player Javier Navarro.

== Trophies balance ==
Category	Trophy	Started round	First match	Result	Last match
Friendly Trophy	16th Trofeo de la Sal	Final	23 July 2010	Winner	23 July 2010
Friendly Trophy	Achille & Cesare Bortolotti Trophy	Final	30 July 2010	Winner	30 July 2010
Friendly Trophy	56th Ramón de Carranza Trophy	Semi-finals	7 August 2010	Third Place	8 August 2010
Friendly Trophy	3rd Antonio Puerta Trophy	Final	24 November 2010	Runners-up	24 November 2010
Competitive	Liga BBVA	—	28 August 2010	5th	21 May 2011
Competitive	Copa del Rey	Round of 32	27 October 2010	Third Place	2 February 2011
Competitive	Supercopa de España	Final	14 August 2010	Runners-up	21 August 2010
Competitive	UEFA Champions League	Fourth Qualifying Round	18 August 2010	Fourth Qualifying Round	24 August 2010
Competitive	UEFA Europa League	Group Stage	16 September 2010	Round of 32	23 February 2011

=== Competitive balance ===
Biggest win
	Home				Away			
Liga BBVA	22 January 2011	Matchday 20	v. Levante	4–1	28 August 2010	Matchday 1	v. Levante	1–4
Liga BBVA	1 March 2011	Matchday 26	v. Sporting de Gijón	3–0	28 August 2010	Matchday 1	v. Levante	1–4
Copa del Rey	10 November 2010	Round of 32, 2nd leg	v. Real Unión	6–1	27 October 2010	Round of 32, 1st leg	v. Real Unión	0–4
Champions League	None due to the elimination in the fourth qualifying round							
Europa League	4 November 2010	GS, Matchday 4	v. (Ukraine) Karpaty Lviv	4–0	30 September 2010	GS, Matchday 2	v. (Germany) Borussia Dortmund	0–1
Europa League	4 November 2010	GS, Matchday 4	v. (Ukraine) Karpaty Lviv	4–0	21 October 2010	GS, Matchday 3	v. (Ukraine) Karpaty Lviv	0–1
Europa League	4 November 2010	GS, Matchday 4	v. (Ukraine) Karpaty Lviv	4–0	23 February 2011	Round of 32, 2nd leg	v. (Portugal) Porto	0–1
Biggest loss
	Home				Away			
Liga BBVA	21 November 2010	Matchday 35	v. Real Madrid	2–6	31 October 2010	Matchday 9	v. Barcelona	5–0
Copa del Rey	26 January 2011	Semifinals, 1st leg	v. Real Madrid	0–1	2 February 2011	Semifinals, 2nd leg	v. Real Madrid	2–0
Champions League	24 August 2010	QR 4, 2nd leg	v. (Portugal) Braga	3–4	18 August 2010	QR 4, 1st leg	v. (Portugal) Braga	1–0
Europa League	16 September 2010	GS, Matchday 1	v. (France) Paris-Saint Germain	0–1	2 December 2010	GS, Matchday 5	v. (France) Paris Saint-Germain	4–2
Europa League	17 February 2011	Round of 32, 1st leg	v. (Portugal) Porto	1–2	2 December 2010	GS, Matchday 5	v. (France) Paris Saint-Germain	4–2

== Summer transfers ==
=== In ===
(substituted on) In (5 players)
Player	From	Fee
(France) Mouhamadou Dabo	(France) Saint-Étienne	Free
(Italy) Tiberio Guarente	(Italy) Atalanta	€5,500,000
(Spain) Luis Alberto	(Spain) Sevilla Atlético	Free
(Spain) Dani Jiménez	(Spain) Sevilla C	Free
(Spain) Alexis	(Spain) Valencia	€5,000,000
(Spain) Cala	(Spain) Sevilla Atlético	Free

=== Out ===
(substituted off) Out (7 players)
Player	New Team	Fee
(Brazil) Adriano	(Spain) Barcelona	€9,500,000
(Spain) José Ángel Crespo	(Italy) Padova	Free
(Spain) José Manuel Casado	(Spain) Rayo Vallecano	Free
(Uruguay) Javier Chevantón	(Italy) Lecce	Free
(France) Sébastien Squillaci	(England) Arsenal	€6,500,000
(Spain) Lolo	(Spain) Osasuna	Free
(Argentina) Aldo Duscher	(Spain) Espanyol	Free

=== Loan in ===
(substituted on) Loan in (2 players)
Player	From
(Italy) Luca Cigarini	(Italy) Napoli
(Uruguay) Martín Cáceres	(Spain) Barcelona

=== Loan out ===
(substituted off) Loan out (4 players)
Player	Team
(Argentina) Emiliano Armenteros	(Spain) Rayo Vallecano
(Spain) David Prieto	(Spain) Tenerife
(Belgium) Tom De Mul	(Belgium) Standard Liège
(Spain) Cala	(Spain) Cartagena

=== Loan return ===
(substituted on) Loan return (2 players)
Italics for players returning to the club but left it during pre-season
Player	From
(Spain) Alejandro Alfaro	(Spain) Tenerife
(Ivory Coast) Arouna Koné	(Germany) Hannover 96
(Spain) José Ángel Crespo	(Spain) Racing Santander
(Argentina) Emiliano Armenteros	(Spain) Xerez
(Spain) José Manuel Casado	(Spain) Xerez
(Spain) David Prieto	(Spain) Xerez
(Uruguay) Javier Chevantón	(Italy) Atalanta

=== Loan end ===
(substituted off) Loan end (1 players)
Player	Returns to
(Lithuania) Marius Stankevičius	(Italy) Sampdoria; After the return to Genoa, Sampdoria loan him again, this time to (Spain) Valencia

== Winter transfers ==
=== In ===
(substituted on) In (2 players)
Player	From	Fee
(Chile) Gary Medel	(Chile) Universidad Católica; He was playing on loan at (Argentina) Boca Juniors	€3,000,000
(Croatia) Ivan Rakitić	(Germany) Schalke 04	€1,500,000

=== Out ===
(substituted off) Out (2 players)
Player	New Team	Fee
(France) Abdoulay Konko	(Italy) Genoa	€6,000,000
(Brazil) Luís Fabiano	(Brazil) São Paulo	€7,600,000

=== Loan out ===
(substituted off) Loan out (2 players)
Player	Team
(Spain) Antonio Luna	(Spain) Almería
(Spain) José Carlos	(Spain) Cartagena

== Current squad ==
=== Squad ===
Note: Flags indicate national team as defined under FIFA eligibility rules; some limited exceptions apply. Players may hold more than one non-FIFA nationality.

No.	Pos.	Nation	Player
1	GK	ESP	Andrés Palop (captain)
2	DF	ARG	Federico Fazio
3	DF	SRB	Ivica Dragutinović
4	DF	URU	Martín Cáceres (On loan from Barcelona)
5	DF	ESP	Fernando Navarro
6	MF	CIV	Romaric
7	MF	ESP	Jesús Navas (Long-term injured)
8	MF	CIV	Didier Zokora
9	MF	ARG	Diego Perotti
11	MF	BRA	Renato
12	FW	MLI	Frédéric Kanouté
13	GK	ESP	Javi Varas
14	DF	FRA	Julien Escudé
15	MF	ESP	Alejandro Alfaro

No.	Pos.	Nation	Player
16	MF	ESP	Diego Capel
17	DF	ESP	Sergio Sánchez
18	FW	ESP	Álvaro Negredo
19	MF	ITA	Luca Cigarini (On loan from Napoli)
20	DF	FRA	Mouhamadou Dabo
21	MF	ARG	Lautaro Acosta
22	FW	CIV	Arouna Koné
23	DF	ESP	Alexis
24	MF	CHI	Gary Medel (No. 41 in UEL)
25	MF	CRO	Ivan Rakitić (No. 40 in UEL)
26	FW	ESP	Luis Alberto
29	GK	ESP	Dani Jiménez
31	FW	ESP	Rodri
–	MF	ITA	Tiberio Guarente (Long-term injured)

=== Youth system ===
Note: Flags indicate national team as defined under FIFA eligibility rules; some limited exceptions apply. Players may hold more than one non-FIFA nationality.

No.	Pos.	Nation	Player
33	GK	ESP	Julián Cuesta
34	DF	COL	Bernardo Espinosa

No.	Pos.	Nation	Player
—	MF	ESP	José Campaña
—	DF	ESP	Deivid

=== Long-term injuries ===
==== Sergio Sánchez's cardiac pathology ====
Out between: January–December 2010

On 1 January 2010, Sevilla's medical services detected some cardiac pathology in Sergio Sánchez's heart and they recommended to him to stop his activity with the team. In May 2010, he was surgical operated in Hamburg, Germany, and received orders of resting during six or seven months, when there will be valued (beginning of 2011) the possibility of returning to play football. On 27 December 2010, doctors at Vall d'Hebrón Hospital in Barcelona had officially told Sevilla that Sánchez has passed the latest tests about his recovery because of the surgical operation, so he can play football again from 2011.

==== Jesús Navas' left ankle (I) ====
Out between: 16–30 September 2010; October 2010 – January 2011

On 16 September 2010, in the Europa League match against Paris Saint-Germain, Jesús Navas twisted his left ankle. He had to be replaced during that match because he couldn't walk as usual. His injury didn't appear serious, and he was considered recovered and fit to play in the pre-game Europa League against Borussia Dortmund at the Westfalenstadion. He had to be replaced on 76' because of a strong relapse. He was replaced by Julien Escudé. During October, it was thought that he needed surgery. He submitted it on 1 November in Vitoria-Gasteiz. He was operated by Dr. Mikel Sánchez and could return to play after Christmas, on 2 January against Osasuna.

==== Tiberio Guarente's injured leg ====
Out between: November 2010 – Following season

On 6 November 2010, Sevilla's medical services discovered a strange injury in Tiberio Guarente's leg that required treatment, ultimately sidelining him for six months.

==== Jesús Navas' left ankle (II) ====
Out between: April 2011 – Following season

In a training session prior to a match against Mallorca, Jesús Navas had discomfort in his left ankle, which had been twisted in the beginning of the session in a Europa League match against Paris Saint-Germain. He was not called to that match and medical tests were made. It was discovered that he suffered from a relapse of that injury, a stress fracture in his ankle that will keep him out of play for six weeks. It is believed he will not play more in the remainder of the season.

=== Nominated by their national football team ===
List of players nominated by their national team
2	Federico Fazio	Argentina	v. United States (26 March 2011) v. Costa Rica (29 March 2011)
4	Martín Cáceres	Uruguay	v. Indonesia (8 October 2010) v. China (12 October 2010) v. Chile (17 November 2010) v. Estonia (25 March 2011) v. Republic of Ireland (29 March 2011) v. Germany (29 May 2011)
6	Romaric	Ivory Coast	v. Italy (10 August 2010) v. Rwanda (4 September 2010) v. Burundi (8 October 2010) v. Poland (17 November 2010) v. Mali (8 February 2011) v. Benin (25 March 2011)
7	Jesús Navas	Spain	v. Mexico (11 August 2010) v. Liechtenstein (3 September 2010) v. Argentina (7 September 2010) v. Colombia (9 February 2011) v. Czech Republic (25 March 2011) v. Lithuania (29 March 2011)
8	Didier Zokora	Ivory Coast	v. Italy (10 August 2010) v. Rwanda (4 September 2010) v. Burundi (8 October 2010) v. Poland (17 November 2010) v. Mali (8 February 2011) v. Benin (25 March 2011)
16	Diego Capel	Spain U21	v. Finland (11 August 2010) v. Netherlands (3 September 2010) v. Poland (7 September 2010) v. Croatia (9 October 2010) v. Croatia (12 October 2010) v. Denmark (8 February 2011) v. Belarus (28 March 2011)
19	Luca Cigarini	Italy	v. Estonia (3 September 2010) v. Faroe Islands (7 September 2010)
24	Gary Medel	Chile	v. Portugal (26 March 2011) v. Colombia (29 March 2011)
25	Ivan Rakitić	Croatia	v. Czech Republic (9 February 2011) v. Georgia (26 March 2011) v. France (29 March 2011)
26	Luis Alberto	Spain U19	v. Portugal (19 April 2011) v. France (20 April 2011) v. Russia (2broadcast 2011)
31	Rodri	Spain U21	v. France (24 March 2011)

== Match stats ==
No.	Pos.	Player	Goal					Booked					(yellow card) (yellow-red card)					Sent off (straight red)				
No.	Pos.	Player	Liga	Cup	SCE	UCL	UEL	Liga	Cup	SCE	UCL	UEL	Liga	Cup	SCE	UCL	UEL	Liga	Cup	SCE	UCL	UEL
1	GK	(Spain) Andrés Palop						2				1						1				
2	DF	(Argentina) Federico Fazio	1					3														
4	DF	(Uruguay) Martín Cáceres	1					6	1			1										
5	DF	(Spain) Fernando Navarro						8	4		1	4	1					1				
6	MF	(Ivory Coast) Romaric	1	3			1	5	1	1		1										
7	MF	(Spain) Jesús Navas (LTI)	1			1		3														
8	MF	(Ivory Coast) Didier Zokora						10	3	1	1	2										
9	MF	(Argentina) Diego Perotti	3	1				5			1	2										
10	FW	(Brazil) Luís Fabiano (Out)	10	1	1	1	1	2	1			1										
11	MF	(Brazil) Renato	2	1				1														
12	FW	(Mali) Frédéric Kanouté	12	1	2	1	5	6	1			1										
13	GK	(Spain) Javi Varas						3														
14	DF	(France) Julien Escudé	2					6			2	1										
15	MF	(Spain) Alejandro Alfaro	2	3			2	1														
16	MF	(Spain) Diego Capel		1				2	1		1											
17	DF	(Spain) Sergio Sánchez						3	1					1								
18	FW	(Spain) Álvaro Negredo	20	5			1	4														
19	MF	(Italy) Luca Cigarini		1			2	2		2												
20	DF	(France) Mouhamadou Dabo						6	1	1								1				
21	MF	(Argentina) Lautaro Acosta		1				3														
23	DF	(Spain) Alexis		2				8	3			2	1				1					
24	DF	(France) Abdoulay Konko (Out)	2					3					1									
24	MF	(Chile) Gary Medel				No. 40		7			No. 40		1			No. 40					No. 40	
25	MF	(Italy) Tiberio Guarente (LTI)						1				2										
25	MF	(Croatia) Ivan Rakitić	5			No. 41		1			No. 41					No. 41					No. 41	
27	DF	(Spain) Antonio Luna (Out)						1	1													
30	FW	(Spain) José Carlos (Out)		2																		
31	FW	(Spain) Rodri		1				2														
34	DF	(Colombia) Bernardo		1																		

== Match results ==
=== Pre-season ===
==== Friendly matches ====
16 July 2010	Chiclana	1–5	Sevilla	Chiclana de la Frontera (Cádiz)
21:30 CEST	Romero 88'	(Report); Live TV: SFC Televisión	14' Rodri; 32' Perotti; 45' Kanouté; 69' Escudé; 84' Negredo	Stadium: Municipal de Chiclana

17 July 2010	Rota XI	0–6	Sevilla	Rota (Cádiz)
21:30 CEST		(Report); Live TV: SFC Televisión	12' Rodri; 23' Perotti; 51' Negredo; 75' Kanouté; 76', 89' Alfaro	Stadium: Alcalde Navarro Flores

8 September 2010	Conil	1–4	Sevilla	Conil de la Frontera (Cádiz)
19:00 CEST	Moncho 66'	(Report); Live TV: SFC Televisión; Note:	4' Perotti; 51' Acosta; 65' Negredo; 77' Rodri	Stadium: Municipal José Antonio Pérez Ureba

==== 16th Trofeo de la Sal ====
23 July 2010 Final	San Fernando	1–4	Sevilla	San Fernando (Cádiz)
21:30 CEST	Prince 89'	(Report); Live TV: SFC Televisión	13' Alfaro; 35', 43' Negredo; 69' Capel	Stadium: Bahía Sur; Attendance: 600; Referee: (Spain) (Andalusia) Fernández Cano

==== Achille & Cesare Bortolotti Trophy ====
31 July 2010 Final	Atalanta	1–2	Sevilla	Bergamo
19:00 CEST	Tiribocchi 16'	Live TV: SFC Televisión	26' (pen.) Luís Fabiano; 69' Kanouté	Stadium: Atleti Azzurri d'Italia

==== 56th Ramón de Carranza Trophy ====
Semi-finals
6 August – Cádiz
Cádiz	1 (5)
Atlético Madrid (p)	1 (6)
7 August – Cádiz
Sevilla	1 (1)
Espanyol (p)	1 (4)

Final
8 August – Cádiz
Atlético Madrid	1 (3)
Espanyol (p)	1 (4)
Third place
8 August – Cádiz
Cádiz	2
Sevilla	3

7 August 2010 Semifinal	Sevilla	1–1 (1–4 p)	Espanyol	Cádiz
22:00 CEST	Kanouté 45' (pen.); Zokora (yellow card)	(Report); Live TV: SFC Televisión	41' López; (yellow card) Galán	Stadium: Ramón de Carranza; Referee: (Spain) (Valencian Community) Ayza Gámez
	Penalties
	Kanouté (penalty scored); Romaric (penalty missed); Perotti (penalty missed)		(penalty scored) Coro; (penalty scored) Amat; (penalty scored) Fonte; (penalty scored) Vázquez

8 August 2010 3rd Place Play-off	Cádiz	2–3	Sevilla	Cádiz
18:30 CEST	Caballero 1'; Bueno 65' (pen.); Pecci (yellow card); Moke (yellow card); Germán (yellow card); Cifuentes (yellow card) (yellow-red card) 90'	(Report); Live TV: SFC Televisión	9' Fazio; 63', 75' Negredo; (yellow card) Romaric; (yellow card) Guarente; (yellow card) Navas	Stadium: Ramón de Carranza; Attendance: 5,000; Referee: (Spain) (Andalusia) Figueroa Vázquez

==== 3rd Antonio Puerta Trophy ====
24 November 2010 Final	Sevilla	1–1 (2–4 p)	Granada	Sevilla
22:00 CET	José Carlos 58'; Cigarini (yellow card) 79'	(Report); Live TV: SFC Televisión; Note:	9' Calvo	Stadium: Ramón Sánchez Pizjuán; Attendance: 3,000; Referee: (Spain) (Andalusia) Mariscal Sánchez
	Penalties
	Renato (penalty scored); Campaña (penalty missed); José Carlos (penalty missed); Rodri (penalty scored)		(penalty scored) Siqueira; (penalty scored) Pérez; (penalty scored) Abel; (penalty scored) Lucena

=== Supercopa de España ===
==== Final ====
Team 1	Agg.	Team 2	1st leg	2nd leg
Sevilla	3–5	Barcelona	3–1	0–4

===== First leg =====
14 August 2010
21:30 CEST

Sevilla	3–1	Barcelona
Luís Fabiano 62'; Kanouté 73', 83'	(Report); Live TV:	21' Ibrahimović

Ramón Sánchez Pizjuán, Seville
Attendance: 38,000
Referee: (Spain) (Asturias) César Muñiz Fernández

Sevilla	Barcelona

SEVILLA
GK	1	(Spain) Andrés Palop (c)
DF	24	(France) Abdoulay Konko
DF	14	(France) Julien Escudé
DF	2	(Argentina) Federico Fazio
DF	20	(France) Mouhamadou Dabo	(yellow card) 70'
MF	6	(Ivory Coast) Romaric		(substituted off) 45'
MF	8	(Ivory Coast) Didier Zokora	(yellow card) 58'
MF	11	(Brazil) Renato		(substituted off) 64'
FW	7	(Spain) Jesús Navas
FW	10	(Brazil) Luís Fabiano	62'	(substituted off) 73'
FW	9	(Argentina) Diego Perotti
Substitutes:
GK	13	(Spain) Javi Varas
DF	4	(France) Sébastien Squillaci
MF	19	(Italy) Luca Cigarini	(yellow card) 72'	(substituted on) 45'
MF	15	(Spain) Alejandro Alfaro
MF	16	(Spain) Diego Capel
FW	18	(Spain) Álvaro Negredo		(substituted on) 73'
FW	12	(Mali) Frédéric Kanouté	73', 83'	(substituted on) 64'
Manager:
(Spain) Antonio Álvarez Giráldez

BARCELONA
GK	31	(Spain) Rubén Miño
DF	2	(Brazil) Dani Alves	(yellow card) 90+1'
DF	18	(Argentina) Gabriel Milito (c)		(substituted off) 82'
DF	22	(France) Eric Abidal
DF	19	(Brazil) Maxwell
DF	33	(Spain) Sergi Gómez
MF	15	(Mali) Seydou Keita
MF	37	(Spain) Oriol Romeu
MF	34	(Mexico) Jonathan dos Santos		(substituted off) 66'
FW	9	(Sweden) Zlatan Ibrahimović	21'	(substituted off) 53'
FW	11	(Spain) Bojan
Substitutes:
GK	38	(Spain) Oier
DF	35	(Spain) Marc Muniesa
DF	21	(Brazil) Adriano		(substituted on) 82'
DF	30	(Spain) Thiago		(substituted on) 66'
MF	28	(Spain) Sergi Roberto
MF	20	(Spain) Jeffrén
FW	10	(Argentina) Lionel Messi		(substituted on) 53'
Manager:
(Spain) Pep Guardiola

Man of the Match:
Frédéric Kanouté (Sevilla)

Assistant referees:
(Asturias) José Manuel Fernández Miranda
(Asturias) Javier Hugo Novoa Robles
Fourth official:
(Asturias) Pablo Fernández Pérez

===== Second leg =====
21 August 2010
20:30 CEST

Barcelona	4–0	Sevilla
Konko 14' (o.g.); Messi 24', 44', 90+1'	(Report); Live TV:

Camp Nou, Barcelona
Attendance: 67,414
Referee: (Spain) (Cantabria) Fernando Teixeira Vitienes

FC Barcelona	Sevilla FC

FC BARCELONA
GK	1	(Spain) Víctor Valdés
DF	2	(Brazil) Dani Alves
DF	3	(Spain) Gerard Piqué	(yellow card) 79'
DF	22	(France) Eric Abidal
DF	19	(Brazil) Maxwell
MF	16	(Spain) Sergio Busquets
MF	6	(Spain) Xavi (c)		(substituted off) 88'
MF	15	(Mali) Seydou Keita
FW	10	(Argentina) Lionel Messi	24', 44', 90+1'
FW	11	(Spain) Bojan		(substituted off) 57'
FW	17	(Spain) Pedro		(substituted off) 57'
Substitutes:
GK	13	(Spain) José Manuel Pinto
DF	5	(Spain) Carles Puyol
DF	18	(Argentina) Gabriel Milito
MF	8	(Spain) Andrés Iniesta		(substituted on) 57'
MF	21	(Brazil) Adriano		(substituted on) 88'
FW	9	(Sweden) Zlatan Ibrahimović
FW	7	(Spain) David Villa		(substituted on) 57'
Manager:
(Spain) Pep Guardiola

SEVILLA FC
GK	1	(Spain) Andrés Palop (c)
DF	5	(Spain) Fernando Navarro
DF	14	(France) Julien Escudé
DF	24	(France) Abdoulay Konko	14' (o.g.)
DF	20	(France) Mouhamadou Dabo
MF	6	(Ivory Coast) Romaric	(yellow card) 33'	(substituted off) 61'
MF	7	(Spain) Jesús Navas
MF	8	(Ivory Coast) Didier Zokora
MF	15	(Spain) Alejandro Alfaro		(substituted off) 61'
MF	16	(Spain) Diego Capel		(substituted off) 61'
FW	18	(Spain) Álvaro Negredo
Substitutes:
GK	13	(Spain) Javi Varas
DF	2	(Argentina) Federico Fazio
MF	9	(Argentina) Diego Perotti		(substituted on) 61'
FW	10	(Brazil) Luís Fabiano		(substituted on) 61'
MF	11	(Brazil) Renato
MF	19	(Italy) Luca Cigarini	(yellow card) 89'	(substituted on) 61'
FW	31	(Spain) Rodri
Manager:
(Spain) Antonio Álvarez Giráldez

Man of the Match:
Lionel Messi (Barcelona)

Assistant referees:
(Cantabria) Victoriano Díaz Casado
(Cantabria) Manuel Ángel Torre Cimiano
Fourth official:
(Cantabria) Alberto Díaz Arias

=== La Liga ===
Matchday	1	2	3	4	5	6	7	8	9	10	11	12	13	14	15	16	17	18	19	20	21	22	23	24	25	26	27	28	29	30	31	32	33	34	35	36	37	38
Against	LEV	DEP	MGA	RAC	HÉR	ATM	SPG	ATH	FCB	VAL	ZAR	MLL	GET	VIL	ALM	RMA	OSA	RSO	ESP	LEV	DEP	MGA	RAC	HÉR	ATM	SPG	ATH	FCB	VAL	ZAR	MLL	GET	VIL	ALM	RMA	OSA	RSO	ESP
Venue	A	H	A	H	A	H	A	H	A	H	A	H	H	A	H	A	H	A	H	H	A	H	A	H	A	H	A	H	A	H	A	A	H	A	H	A	H	A
Position	2	3	2	5	7	5	7	6	8	6	5	7	8	10	11	11	10	10	10	8	8	7	8	7	7	7	7	7	7	6	5	6	6	5	6	6	5	5
Goal Average (useful in case of tie)																				Won	Won	Won	Lost	Lost	Won	Won	Lost	Lost	Won	Won	Lost	Lost	Lost	Lost	Lost	Won	Won	Won

Win Draw Lost

		All							Home							Away						
		Pts	W	D	L	F	A	Dif.	Pts	W	D	L	F	A	Dif.	Pts	W	D	L	F	A	Dif.
5	Sevilla FC	58	17	7	14	62	61	+1	34	10	4	5	35	27	+8	24	7	3	9	27	34	−7

Liga BBVA Winner (also qualified for 2011–12 UEFA Champions League Group Stage)
2011–12 UEFA Champions League Group Stage
2011–12 UEFA Champions League 4th Qualifying Round
2011–12 UEFA Europa League Group Stage
2011–12 UEFA Europa League 4th Qualifying Round (From 3 February: 5th and 6th Liga BBVA qualified teams because of the 2011 Copa del Rey Final)
2011–12 UEFA Europa League 3rd Qualifying Round (From 3 February: 7th Liga BBVA qualified team because of the 2011 Copa del Rey Final)
Relegation to Liga Adelante

- With Antonio Álvarez

28 August 2010 1	Levante	1–4	Sevilla	Valencia
22:00 CEST	Rubén 9' (pen.); Cerrajería (yellow card) 27'; Rodas (yellow card) 56'; Ballesteros (yellow card) 87'; Jordà (yellow card) 89'	(Report); Live TV: GolT &	(yellow card) 9' Cigarini; 12', 62' Konko; 27' (pen.) Negredo; (yellow card) 59' Perotti; (yellow card) 70' Navas; (yellow card) 73' Dabo; 87' Renato	Stadium: Ciutat de València; Attendance: 20,000; Referee: (Basque Country (autonomous community)) Miguel Pérez Lasa

12 September 2010 2	Sevilla	0–0	Deportivo La Coruña	Seville
21:00 CEST	Zokora (yellow card) 16'; Escudé (yellow card) 66'; Cáceres (yellow card) 73'	(Report); Live TV:	(yellow card) 25' Tomás; (yellow card) 78' Guardado; (yellow card) 86' Lopo	Stadium: Ramón Sánchez Pizjuán; Referee: (Castile and León) Turienzo Alvarez

19 September 2010 3	Málaga	1–2	Sevilla	Málaga
21:00 CEST	Rondón 13'; Gámez (yellow card) 50'; Eliseu (yellow card) 75'	(Report); Live TV:	19' Alfaro; (yellow card) 30' Cigarini; 45+1' Cáceres; (yellow card) 47' Escudé; (yellow card) 58' Dabo; (yellow card) 69' Perotti; (yellow card) 76' Acosta; (yellow card) 85' Romaric	Stadium: La Rosaleda; Referee: (Basque Country (autonomous community)) Carlos Delgado Ferreiro

23 September 2010 4	Sevilla	1–1	Racing Santander	Seville
22:00 CEST	Negredo 13' (pen.)	(Report); Live TV: GolT & C+ Liga	(yellow card) 11' Toño; (yellow card) 22' Tziolis; 54' Pinillos	Stadium: Ramón Sánchez Pizjuán; Referee: (Valencian Community) Miguel Ayza Gámez

26 September 2010 5	Hércules	2–0	Sevilla	Alicante
19:00 CEST	Trezeguet 20' (pen.), 37', (yellow card) 27'; Aguilar (yellow card) 86'	(Report); Live TV: GolT & C+ Liga	(yellow card) 64' Dabo	Stadium: Rico Pérez; Referee: (Cantabria) Fernando Teixeira Vitienes

- With Gregorio Manzano

3 October 2010 6	Sevilla	3–1	Atlético Madrid	Seville
17:00 CEST	Capel (yellow card) 23'; Negredo 28', (yellow card) 37'; Perotti 35', (yellow card) 45'; Kanouté 51'; Konko (yellow card) 81'	(Report); Live TV:	(yellow card) 16' Tiago; (yellow card) 17' López; (yellow card) 26' Simão; 58' Costa	Stadium: Ramón Sánchez Pizjuán; Referee: (Catalonia) Xavier Estrada Fernández

17 October 2010 7	Sporting de Gijón	2–0	Sevilla	Gijón
21:00 CEST	Sangoy 5', (yellow card) 12'; Hernández (yellow card) 36'; Castro 50', (yellow card) 82'; Rivera (yellow card) 61'; José Ángel (yellow card) 74'; Novo (yellow card) 84'	(Report); Live TV:	(yellow card) 36' Alexis; (yellow card) 61' Guarente	Stadium: El Molinón; Referee: (Castile and León) José González González

24 October 2010 8	Sevilla	4–3	Athletic Bilbao	Seville
19:00 CEST	Navarro (yellow card) 5' (yellow-red card) 63'; Luís Fabiano (yellow card) 27', (goal) 35', 62'; Alexis (yellow card) 36'; Kanouté 44' (pen.), 79' (pen.); Konko (yellow card) 76'; Palop (yellow card) 82'	(Report); Live TV: GolT & C+ Liga	(yellow card) 33' Gurpegui; (yellow card) 39', (goal) 73', 76' Llorente; (yellow card) 79' Iraizoz; (yellow card) 80' Ustaritz; (yellow card) 89' Koikili; 90+3' Gabilondo	Stadium: Ramón Sánchez Pizjuán; Referee: (Aragon) Clos Gómez

31 October 2010 9	Barcelona	5–0	Sevilla	Barcelona
22:00 CEST	Messi 3', 63'; Villa 23', 89'; Puyol (yellow card) 28'; Alves 52'	(Report); Live TV: laSexta, Canal Nou Telemadrid; TV3, IB3; TPA7	(yellow card) 21' Kanouté; (yellow card) 28' Alexis; (yellow card) 40' (yellow-red card) 45' Konko	Stadium: Camp Nou; Referee: (Castile and León) Javier Turienzo Álvarez

8 November 2010 10	Sevilla	2–0	Valencia	Seville
21:30 CET	Dabo (yellow card) 44'; Negredo 53'; Alfaro 76'	(Report); Live TV: laSexta, Canal Nou Telemadrid; TV3, IB3; TPA7	(red card) 26' Topal	Stadium: Ramón Sánchez Pizjuán; Referee: (Basque Country (autonomous community)) Eduardo Iturralde González

14 November 2010 11	Real Zaragoza	1–2	Sevilla	Zaragoza
17:00 CET	Contini (yellow card) 12'; Bertolo 53'; Braulio (yellow card) 58'; Diogo (yellow card) 61'; Obradović (yellow card) 69'	(Report); Live TV:	28', (yellow card) 68' Luís Fabiano; (yellow card) 41' Alexis; (yellow card) 65' Kanouté; (red card) 70' Navarro; 90+2' Negredo; (yellow card) 90+4' Varas	Stadium: La Romareda; Referee: (Asturias) César Muñiz Fernández

21 November 2010 12	Sevilla	1–2	Mallorca	Seville
19:00 CET	Alfaro (yellow card) 28'; Luna (yellow card) 79'; Luís Fabiano 87'	(Report); Live TV: GolT & C+ Liga	(yellow card) 26' Nunes; 35' Pereira; 88' Webó	Stadium: Ramón Sánchez Pizjuán; Referee: (Valencian Community) Antonio Mateu Lahoz

27 November 2010 13	Sevilla	1–3	Getafe	Seville
20:00 CET	Kanouté 29', (yellow card) 78'; Alexis (yellow card) 73'; Rodri (yellow card) 90'	(Report); Live TV: GolT & C+ Liga	(yellow card) 11' Marcano; 56' (pen.) Manu; 58' Miku; 77' Ríos; (yellow card) 85' Codina	Stadium: Ramón Sánchez Pizjuán; Referee: (Castile and León) José González González

5 December 2010 14	Villarreal	1–0	Sevilla	Villarreal
19:00 CET	Nilmar 29'; Musacchio (yellow card) 40'; Rossi (yellow card) 63'; Bruno (yellow card) 82'	(Report); Live TV: GolT & C+ Liga	(yellow card) 22' Zokora; (yellow card) 41' Kanouté; (yellow card) 75' Cáceres	Stadium: El Madrigal; Attendance: 24,000; Referee: (Navarre) Alberto Undiano Mallenco

11 December 2010 15	Sevilla	1–3	Almería	Seville
20:00 CET	Zokora (yellow card) 7'; Palop (yellow card) 30'; Alexis (yellow card) 41' (yellow-red card) 88'; Kanouté 82'	(Report); Live TV: GolT & C+ Liga	(yellow card) 19', (goal) 47' Vargas; (yellow card) 62' Ortiz; (yellow card) 73' Jakobsen; 80', 90+1' Piatti	Stadium: Ramón Sánchez Pizjuán; Referee: (Cantabria) José Antonio Teixeira Vitienes

19 December 2010 16	Real Madrid	1–0	Sevilla	Madrid
21:00 CET	Carvalho (yellow card) 45' (yellow-red card) 63'; Di María (yellow card) 60', (goal) 78'; Casillas (yellow card) 63'; L. Diarra (yellow card) 70'; Pepe (yellow card) 70'; Özil (yellow card) 78'; Pedro León (yellow card) 87'; Ramos (yellow card) 89'	(Report); Live TV:	(yellow card) 80' Zokora; (yellow card) 86' Cáceres; (yellow card) 89' Acosta; (red card) 90+1' Dabo	Stadium: Santiago Bernabéu; Referee: (Aragon) Carlos Clos Gómez

2 January 2011 17	Sevilla	1–0	Osasuna	Seville
20:00 CET	Zokora (yellow card) 33'; Kanouté 35'	(Report); Live TV: GolT &	(yellow card) 33' Soriano; (yellow card) 58' Oier; (yellow card) 60' Vadócz; (yellow card) 65' Puñal; (yellow card) 84' Nélson	Stadium: Ramón Sánchez Pizjuán; Referee: (Catalonia) Alfonso Álvarez Izquierdo

8 January 2011 18	Real Sociedad	2–3	Sevilla	San Sebastián
20:00 CET	Rivas 22', (yellow card) 46'; Llorente 43'; González (yellow card) 56'	(Report); Live TV: GolT & C+ Liga	25', 65' Kanouté; 63' Luís Fabiano; (yellow card) 69' Navarro; (yellow card) 90+1' Varas	Stadium: Anoeta; Referee: (Catalonia) Xavier Estrada Fernández

15 January 2011 19	Sevilla	1–2	Espanyol	Seville
22:00 CET	Alexis (yellow card) 87'; Negredo 90+2'	(Report); Live TV: laSexta; Telemadrid; TV3, IB3; TPA7	(yellow card) 32' Forlín; 41', 78' Callejón; (yellow card) 77' García	Stadium: Ramón Sánchez Pizjuán; Referee: (Community of Madrid) Carlos Velasco Carballo

22 January 2011 20	Sevilla	4–1	Levante	Seville
18:00 CET	Luís Fabiano 27', 42' (pen.), 67'; Zokora (yellow card) 32'; Escudé 38'; Kanouté (yellow card) 84'	(Report); Live TV: GolT & C+ Liga	(yellow card) 35' Rodas; 57' Xisco; (yellow card) 88' Del Horno	Stadium: Ramón Sánchez Pizjuán; Referee: (Cantabria) Fernando Teixeira Vitienes

29 January 2011 21	Deportivo La Coruña	3–3	Sevilla FC	A Coruña
22:00 CET	Lassad 15', 61'; Castro (yellow card) 65'; Laure 84'	(Report); Live TV: laSexta; Telemadrid; TV3, IB3; TPA7	(red card) 57' Palop; 63', 79' Negredo; (yellow card) 65' Cáceres; (yellow card) 71' Dabo; 74' Escudé; (yellow card) 85' Varas	Stadium: Riazor; Referee: (Valencian Community) Miguel Ayza Gámez

6 February 2011 22	Sevilla	0–0	Málaga	Seville
17:00 CET	Zokora (yellow card) 18'; Sánchez (yellow card) 37'; Romaric (yellow card) 44'; Navarro (yellow card) 90+1'	(Report); Live TV: GolT & C+ Liga	(yellow card) 40' Gaspar; (yellow card) 84' Silva; (yellow card) 88' Arnau; (yellow card) 90+2' Eliseu	Stadium: Ramón Sánchez Pizjuán; Referee: (Asturias) César Muñiz Fernández

12 February 2011 23	Racing Santander	3–2	Sevilla	Santander
22:00 CET	Christian 12', (red card) 38'; Rakitić 19' (o.g.); Munitis (yellow card) 23'; Nahuelpán (yellow card) 45+1'; Bakircioglu (yellow card) 77'; Pinillos (yellow card) 84'; Arana 90+2'	(Report); Live TV: laSexta; Telemadrid; TV3, IB3; TPA7	39', (yellow card) 90+1' Fazio; (yellow card) 66' Negredo; 83' (pen.) Luís Fabiano; (yellow card) 84' Acosta	Stadium: El Sardinero; Referee: (Basque Country (autonomous community)) Eduardo Iturralde González

20 February 2011 24	Sevilla	1–0	Hércules	Seville
19:00 CET	Rakitić 21'; Navas (yellow card) 71'; Escudé (yellow card) 86'	(Report); Live TV: GolT & C+ Liga	(yellow card) 25' Aguilar; (yellow card) 36' Rodri; (yellow card) 42' Cortés	Stadium: Ramón Sánchez Pizjuán; Referee: (Castile and León) Javier Turienzo Álvarez

26 February 2011 25	Atlético Madrid	2–2	Sevilla	Madrid
18:00 CET	Agüero (yellow card) 44'; Koke 47'; Ujfaluši (yellow card) 52'; Reyes 76'	(Report); Live TV: GolT & C+ Liga	(yellow card) 39' Medel; 41' Negredo; (yellow card) 60' Navarro; 65' Rakitić	Stadium: Vicente Calderón; Referee: (Valencian Community) Antonio Mateu Lahoz

1 March 2011 26	Sevilla	3–0	Sporting de Gijón	Seville
22:00 CET	Luís Fabiano 28' (pen.); Perotti 35'; Negredo 65', (yellow card) 90'; Escudé (yellow card) 80'	(Report); Live TV: GolT & C+ Liga	(yellow card) 24' Sastre; (red card) 26' Eguren	Stadium: Ramón Sánchez Pizjuán; Referee: (Community of Madrid) Antonio Rubinos Pérez

6 March 2011 27	Athletic Bilbao	2–0	Sevilla	Bilbao
19:00 CET	Gurpegui (yellow card) 44'; Fazio 66' (o.g.); Iraola 87' (pen.)	(Report); Live TV: GolT & C+ Liga	(yellow card) 25' Navarro; (yellow card) 57' Escudé; (yellow card) 66' Medel; (yellow card) 74' Perotti	Stadium: San Mamés; Referee: (Catalonia) Alfonso Álvarez Izquierdo

13 March 2011 28	Sevilla	1–1	Barcelona	Seville
21:00 CET	Cáceres (yellow card) 23'; Zokora (yellow card) 27'; Navas 48'; Medel (yellow card) 61'; Navarro (yellow card) 62'; Capel (yellow card) 69'	(Report); Live TV:	30' Bojan; (yellow card) 40' Adriano; (yellow card) 61' Xavi	Stadium: Ramón Sánchez Pizjuán; Referee: (Basque Country (autonomous community)) Miguel Pérez Lasa

20 March 2011 29	Valencia	0–1	Sevilla	Valencia
21:00 CET	Bruno (yellow card) 48'; Joaquín (yellow card) 89'	(Report); Live TV:	(yellow card) 20' Alexis; 70' Rakitić	Stadium: Mestalla; Attendance: 39,500; Referee: (Community of Madrid) Carlos Velasco Carballo

3 April 2011 30	Sevilla	3–1	Real Zaragoza	Sevilla
19:00 CEST	Perotti 42'; Kanouté 55' (pen.); Navas (yellow card) 86'; Negredo 90+2' (pen.)	(Report); Live TV: GolT & C+ Liga	46', (yellow card) 80' Jarošík; (yellow card) 54' Ponzio; (yellow card) 82' Paredes; (yellow card) 90+1' Da Silva	Stadium: Ramón Sánchez Pizjuán; Attendance: 35,000; Referee: (Galicia (Spain)) Iglesias Villanueva

9 April 2011 31	Mallorca	2–2	Sevilla	Palma
22:00 CEST	Castro (yellow card) 8'; Akihiro 15'; De Guzmán (yellow card) 35', (goal) 42'; Nunes (yellow card) 75'	(Report); Live TV: laSexta; Telemadrid; TV3, IB3; TPA7	30' (pen.) Negredo; (yellow card) 36' Medel; (yellow card) 42' Perotti; 67' Rakitić; (yellow card) 76' Fazio; (yellow card) 78' Navarro	Stadium: Iberostar; Referee: (Castile and León) Javier Turienzo Álvarez

16 April 2011 32	Getafe	1–0	Sevilla	Getafe
18:00 CEST	Parejo (yellow card) 39'; Miku 75'; Mané (yellow card) 78'; Sánchez (yellow card) 90+1'	(Report); Live TV: GolT & C+ Liga	(yellow card) 17' Medel; (yellow card) 19' Rodri; (yellow card) 32' Fazio; (yellow card) 85' Navarro	Stadium: Coliseum Alfonso Pérez; Referee: (Cantabria) José Antonio Teixeira Vitienes

24 April 2011 33	Sevilla	3–2	Villarreal	Seville
21:00 CEST	Rakitić 8', (yellow card) 65'; Negredo 14'; Zokora (yellow card) 15'; Romaric 62', (yellow card) 75'	(Report); Live TV:	(yellow card) 7' Musacchio; (yellow card) 18' Mario; 56', (yellow card) 75' (yellow-red card) 85' Marchena; 73' Rossi; (yellow card) 86' Wakaso	Stadium: Ramón Sánchez Pizjuán; Referee: (Navarre) Alberto Undiano Mallenco

1 May 2011 34	Almería	0–1	Sevilla	Almería
17:00 CEST	Bernardello (yellow card) 27'; Jakobsen (red card) 51'; Piatti (yellow card) 75'	(Report); Live TV:	(yellow card) 11' Romaric; (yellow card) 42', (goal) 58' Renato; (yellow card) 75' Medel	Stadium: Juegos del Mediterráneo; Referee: (Community of Madrid) Antonio Rubinos Pérez

7 May 2011 35	Sevilla	2–6	Real Madrid	Seville
22:00 CEST	Sánchez (yellow card) 43'; Negredo 61', 84'; Romaric (yellow card) 81'	(Report); Live TV: laSexta; Telemadrid; TV3, IB3; TPA7	21', (yellow card) 41' Ramos; 31', 65', 70', 75' Ronaldo; 42' Kaká; (yellow card) 88' L. Diarra	Stadium: Ramón Sánchez Pizjuán; Referee: (Valencian Community) Antonio Mateu Lahoz

11 May 2011 36	Osasuna	3–2	Sevilla	Pamplona
22:00 CEST	Sola 65', 86'; Cejudo (yellow card) 85'; Lekić 90'; Pandiani (yellow card) 90+1'	(Report); Live TV: laSexta; Telemadrid; TV3, IB3; TPA7	(yellow card) 24' Dabo; 25', 27' Negredo; (yellow card) 37' Sánchez; (yellow card) 81' (yellow-red card) 86' Medel; (yellow card) 89' Zokora	Stadium: Reyno de Navarra; Attendance: 17,921; Referee: (Asturias) César Muñiz Fernández

15 May 2011 37	Sevilla	3–1	Real Sociedad	Seville
21:00 CEST	Escudé (yellow card) 44'; Kanouté (yellow card) 51', (goal) 53', 58'; Negredo (yellow card) 81', (goal) 85'	(Report); Live TV:	(yellow card) 12' Elustondo; (yellow card) 70' Bergara; 71' Agirretxe; (yellow card) 80' Labaka	Stadium: Ramón Sánchez Pizjuán; Referee: (Castile and León) Javier Turienzo Álvarez

21 May 2011 38	Espanyol	2–3	Sevilla	Cornellà de Llobregat
22:00 CEST	Osvaldo 54'; Verdú 73'	(Report); Live TV:	2', 61' Negredo; 44' Kanouté; (yellow card) 46' Cáceres	Stadium: Cornellà-El Prat; Referee: (Navarre) Alberto Undiano Mallenco

=== UEFA Champions League ===
==== Play-off round ====
18 August 2010 First leg	Braga (Portugal)	1–0	(Spain) Sevilla	Braga, Portugal
20:45 CEST; 19:45 Local time	Garcia (yellow card) 24'; Paulo César (yellow card) 54'; Matheus 62'	Report; Live TV: Canal Nou, TV3, IB3; Aragón Televisión; Telemadrid; Canal Sur, TVG; TV Canaria, CLMTV; TPA7, 7RM; Extremadura, CyL7	(yellow card) 60' Capel; (yellow card) 64' Escudé; (yellow card) 67' Navarro	Stadium: Estádio Municipal de Braga; Attendance: 16,646; Referee: Wolfgang Stark (Germany)

24 August 2010 Second leg	Sevilla (Spain)	3–4 (3–5 agg.)	(Portugal) Braga	Seville, Spain
20:45 CEST	Zokora (yellow card) 43'; Luís Fabiano 60'; Navas 84'; Escudé (yellow card) 86'; Perotti (yellow card) 87'; Kanouté 90+1'	Report; Live TV:	(yellow card) 15' Echiéjilé; (yellow card) 18' Salino; 31' Matheus; (yellow card) 43' Aguiar; 58', 85', 90' Lima	Stadium: Ramón Sánchez Pizjuán; Attendance: 31,350; Referee: Nicola Rizzoli (Italy)

=== UEFA Europa League ===
==== Group stage ====
Group J
	Pld	W	D	L	GF	GA	GD	Pts
(France) Paris Saint-Germain	6	3	3	0	9	4	+5	12
(Spain) Sevilla	6	3	1	2	10	7	+3	10
(Germany) Borussia Dortmund	6	2	3	1	10	7	+3	9
(Ukraine) Karpaty Lviv	6	0	1	5	4	15	−11	1

16 September 2010 1	Sevilla (Spain)	0–1	(France) Paris Saint-Germain	Seville, Spain
21:05 CEST		(Report); Live TV:	(yellow card) 47' Tiéné; 75' Nenê	Stadium: Ramón Sánchez Pizjuán; Attendance: 45,000; Referee: Robert Schörgenhofer (Austria)

30 September 2010 2	Borussia Dortmund (Germany)	0–1	(Spain) Sevilla	Dortmund, Germany
19:00 CEST	Schmelzer (yellow card) 45+1' (yellow-red card) 49'; Großkreutz (yellow card) 52'; Hummels (yellow card) 70'	(Report); Live TV:	45+1' Cigarini; (yellow card) 52' Guarente; (yellow card) 58' Kanouté; (yellow card) 66' Navarro	Stadium: Signal Iduna Park; Attendance: 49,100; Referee: Mike Dean (England)

21 October 2010 3	Karpaty Lviv (Ukraine)	0–1	(Spain) Sevilla	Lviv, Ukraine
19:00 CEST; 20:00 Local time	Checher (yellow card) 71' (yellow-red card) 88'; Holodyuk (yellow card) 79'	(Report); Live TV: Telecinco	(yellow card) 9' Guarente; 34' Kanouté; (yellow card) 61' Navarro; (yellow card) 90' Escudé	Stadium: Ukraina Stadium; Attendance: 27,925; Referee: Bas Nijhuis (Netherlands)

4 November 2010 4	Sevilla (Spain)	4–0	(Ukraine) Karpaty Lviv	Seville, Spain
21:05 CET	Alfaro 9', 42'; Cigarini 31'; Negredo 51'	(Report); Live TV:	(yellow card) 26' Fedetskiy	Stadium: Ramón Sánchez Pizjuán; Attendance: 25,000; Referee: (Turkey) Bülent Yıldırım

2 December 2010 5	Paris Saint-Germain (France)	4–2	(Spain) Sevilla	Paris, France
19:00 CET	Bodmer 17'; Hoarau 20', 47'; Nenê 45'; Chantôme (yellow card) 48'; Jallet (yellow card) 90+1'	(Report); Live TV: & C+ Liga	(yellow card) 11' Zokora; 32', 36' Kanouté; (yellow card) 33' Navarro; (yellow card) 70' Negredo; (yellow card) 90+1' Perotti	Stadium: Parc des Princes; Attendance: 18,783; Referee: (Italy) Luca Banti

15 December 2010 6	Sevilla (Spain)	2–2	(Germany) Borussia Dortmund	Seville, Spain
21:05 CET	Romaric (yellow card) 24', (goal) 31'; Kanouté 35'; Alexis (yellow card) 36'; Zokora (yellow card) 83'; Palop (yellow card) 90+4'	(Report); Live TV: Telecinco	4' Kagawa; (yellow card) 36' Schmelzer; 49', (yellow card) 89' Subotić; (yellow card) 90' Weidenfeller	Stadium: Ramón Sánchez Pizjuán; Referee: (Russia) Aleksei Nikolaev

==== Round of 32 ====
17 February 2011 First leg	Sevilla (Spain)	1–2	(Portugal) Porto	Seville, Spain
21:05 CET	Perotti (yellow card) 53'; Cáceres (yellow card) 53'; Kanouté 65'	(Report); Live TV: Cuatro	(yellow card) 25' J. Rodríguez; (yellow card) 53' Moutinho; 58' Rolando; 85', (yellow card) 88' Guarín	Stadium: Ramón Sánchez Pizjuán; Referee: (Scotland) Craig Thomson

23 February 2011 Second leg	Porto (Portugal)	0–1	(Spain) Sevilla	Porto, Portugal
18:00 CET; 17:00 Local time	Belluschi (yellow card) 50'; Pereira (red card) 72'	(Report); Live TV:	(yellow card) 14' Navarro; (yellow card) 21' (yellow-red card) 77' Alexis; 71', (yellow card) 86' Luís Fabiano	Stadium: Estádio do Dragão; Referee: (England) Howard Webb

Sevilla 2–2 Porto on aggregate. Porto won on away goals.

=== Copa del Rey ===
==== Round of 32 ====
27 October 2010 First leg	Real Unión	0–4	Sevilla	Irún
20:00 CEST	Quero (yellow card) 21'; Berchiche (red card) 50'; García (yellow card) 54'; Iglesias (yellow card) 67'; Descarga (yellow card) 73'	(Report); Live TV:	45', 68' Negredo; 87' Alfaro; 90+2' José Carlos	Stadium: Stadium Gal; Attendance: 4,500; Referee: (Catalonia) Alfonso Álvarez Izquierdo

10 November 2010 Second leg	Sevilla	6–1	Real Unión	Seville
21:00 CET	Alfaro 15' (pen.); Rodri 27'; Bernardo 41'; Cigarini 57'; José Carlos 73'; Zokora (yellow card) 76'; Acosta 85'	(Report); Live TV: SFC Televisión	Romo 12', (yellow card) 28'; Subiza (yellow card) 15'	Stadium: Ramón Sánchez Pizjuán; Attendance: 10,000; Referee: (Valencian Community) Miguel Ayza Gámez

Sevilla won 10–1 on aggregate.

==== Round of 16 ====
22 December 2010 First leg	Sevilla	5–3	Málaga	Seville
20:00 CET	Alfaro 11'; Luna (yellow card) 24'; Negredo 32'; Alexis (yellow card) 49'; Romaric 66', 80', (yellow card) 80'; Capel 82'	(Report); Live TV:	(yellow card) 12' Gaspar; 19', 26' Rondón; 41' Owusu-Abeyie; (yellow card) 60' Malagueño; (yellow card) 74' Weligton	Stadium: Ramón Sánchez Pizjuán; Referee: (Basque Country (autonomous community)) Eduardo Iturralde González

5 January 2011 Second leg	Málaga	0–3	Sevilla	Málaga
18:00 CET	Weligton (yellow card) 50' (yellow-red card) 71'; Demichelis (yellow card) 55'; Gaspar (yellow card) 70'; Eliseu (yellow card) 85'	(Report); Live TV: GolT & C+ Liga	51' Romaric; 64' Perotti; (yellow card) 81' Navarro; 89' Luís Fabiano	Stadium: La Rosaleda; Attendance: 12,000; Referee: (Galicia (Spain)) Ignacio Iglesias Villanueva

Sevilla won 8–3 on aggregate.

==== Quarter-finals ====
12 January 2011 First leg	Villarreal	3–3	Sevilla	Villarreal
20:00 CET	Cani 23'; Rossi 28'; Ruben 55', (yellow card) 82'; Capdevila (yellow card) 77'; Musacchio (yellow card) 87'	(Report); Live TV: GolT & C+ Liga	38', 59' Negredo; (yellow card) 51' Dabo; (yellow card) 70' Capel; (yellow card) 79' Kanouté; (yellow card) 80', (goal) 88' Alexis	Stadium: El Madrigal; Referee: (Navarre) Alberto Undiano Mallenco

18 January 2011 Second leg	Sevilla	3–0	Villarreal	Seville
22:00 CET	Renato 6'; Navarro (yellow card) 24'; Kanouté 46'; Alexis 49'	(Report); Live TV: GolT & C+ Liga	(yellow card) 66' Musacchio; (yellow card) 83' Rossi	Stadium: Ramón Sánchez Pizjuán; Referee: (Basque Country (autonomous community)) Miguel Pérez Lasa

Sevilla won 6–3 on aggregate.

==== Semifinals ====
26 January 2011 First leg	Sevilla	0–1	Real Madrid	Seville
20:00 CET	Luís Fabiano (yellow card) 20'; Zokora (yellow card) 46'; Alexis (yellow card) 48'; Navarro (yellow card) 83'	(Report); Live TV:	(yellow card) 8' L. Diarra; 17' Benzema; (yellow card) 32' Arbeloa; (yellow card) 58' Khedira; (yellow card) 58' Ronaldo; (yellow card) 90' Ramos	Stadium: Ramón Sánchez Pizjuán; Referee: (Navarre) Alberto Undiano Mallenco

2 February 2011 Second leg	Real Madrid	2–0	Sevilla	Madrid
22:00 CET	Alonso (yellow card) 63'; Özil 81'; Ramos (yellow card) 88'; Adebayor 90+4'	(Report); Live TV:	(yellow card) 37' Navarro; (yellow card) 40' Cáceres; (yellow card) 48' Zokora; (yellow card) 65' (yellow-red card) 84' Sánchez	Stadium: Santiago Bernabéu; Referee: (Cantabria) Fernando Teixeira Vitienes

Real Madrid won 3–0 on aggregate.

== Others ==
=== Antonio Álvarez sacked during the season ===
After the successful end of the 2009–10 season, during which the team could qualify for the qualifying round 4 of the UEFA Champions League thanks to a goal from Rodri in Almería in the 95th minute, and the achievement of the 2009–10 Copa del Rey, won the fifth time in club's history, Antonio Álvarez was renowned as the team coach. After an uncertain pre-season with signings that did not seem to provide a good performance, as well as a hesitant start in Champions League and disastrous at Europe League, the directive issued an ultimatum to Álvarez: His team could not lose in Alicante against Hércules. Sevilla, however, fell precipitously; Trezeguet scored twice on 26 September at the Estadio José Rico Perez. After an impromptu meeting of the directive in Seville, on the morning from 26 to 27 September, Álvarez was sacked, with Gregorio Manzano announced as his replacement for the remainder of the season.

Álvarez's matches balance:

Álvarez matches balance
Match against	Result	Category	Notes
v. (Spain) Chiclana	1–5	Preseason	
v. (Spain) Rota XI	0–6	Preseason	
v. (Spain) San Fernando	1–4	Preseason	
v. (Italy) Atalanta	1–2	Preseason	
v. RCD Espanyol	1–1	Preseason	1–4 (p)
v. (Spain) Cádiz	2–3	Preseason	
v. Barcelona	3–1	Supercopa de España	
v. (Portugal) Braga	1–0	Champions League, QR4	
v. Barcelona	4–0	Supercopa de España	3–5 (on aggregate)
v. (Portugal) Braga	3–4	Champions League, QR4	3–5 (on aggregate)
v. Levante	1–4	Liga BBVA	
v. (Spain) Conil	1–4	Friendly	
v. Deportivo La Coruña	0–0	Liga BBVA	
v. (France) Paris Saint-Germain	0–1	Europe League, GS M1	
v. Málaga	1–2	Liga BBVA	
v. Racing Santander	1–1	Liga BBVA	
v. Hércules	2–0	Liga BBVA	

=== 3rd Champions for Africa ===
Three years ago, on 2008 Christmas, Frédéric Kanouté and his own foundation organized a special Christmas match with Unicef trying to help African kids about their education with the ticket's prices and the anonymous donations. The first edition was held in Seville at the Ramón Sánchez Pizjuán, with a smaller support than in 2009 when the match was organized in Madrid at the Santiago Bernabéu, with three-quarters of the stadium full of fans. Both matches have been broadcast in some foreign countries, like United Kingdom and Mali. This year, with more help for the Fundación Kanouté, the match will be held at the Vicente Calderón, the home of Atlético Madrid, on 29 December. Africa United coach José Mourinho starred the funniest anecdotes of the match, taking with him his sons, who threw the ball to one of the goalkeepers of his father's team at half-time, Andrés Palop. In addition, Mourinho plated the linesman in the second-half due to the many marked offsides against his team and took with him to an amateur teen who jumped into the Vicente Calderón to greet a player of the Liga BBVA XI.

29 December 2010	Liga BBVA XI	2–3	Africa United	Madrid
20:15 CET	Ramos 15' (pen.); Uche 38'	Live TV: laSexta	58' Wakaso; 71' Quini; 86' Bodipo	Stadium: Vicente Calderón; Attendance: 30,000; Referee: (Community of Madrid) Antonio Rubinos Pérez

=== Vamos Deixar-te Sem o Título ===
After completing the game between Sevilla and Levante (4–1 home win), the stadium lights went out suddenly after the referees and Levante players retired from the pitch. In the video scoreboard it was shown a video with Andrés Palop's voice background encouraging Sevilla fans to go to the stadium on 26 January to watch the first leg of Copa del Rey Semifinals against Real Madrid CF. The video ended with an image of the Copa del Rey and the phrases "¿Quieres otra Copa?" [Do you want another Cup?] and "Que ningún madridista te quite el asiento" ("Try to avoid that any Real Madrid fan steals your seat") and "Vamos Deixar-te Sem o Título" (in Portuguese) ("We will leave you without the title"). The press in Madrid, akin to Real Madrid, slammed this initiative, considering it disrespectful.

They identified the "We will leave you without the title" as an offensive reference to Real Madrid's José Mourinho. Sevilla also distributed leaflets with the same image and the same phrases. Sevilla coach Gregorio Manzano said at the news conference that he had not seen them. When a reporter gave him one, he just said that "it was an original initiative".

=== LFP failed strike ===
On 11 February 2011, the Liga de Fútbol Profesional (LFP) officially announced a planned strike for La Liga matchday 30 (1, 2 and 3 April 2011) if the Spanish government did not forbid a new TV law regarding La Liga broadcasting. and if it does not give the league a sufficient part of the earnings from La Quiniela, a football pool run by the state lottery. Following Spanish law, at least one match of each La Liga matchday must be broadcast by common TV (laSexta, on the Spanish TDT). The LFP wanted to force pay TV channels and radio stations to broadcast entire matches or summaries too. On 22 March, the LFP announced that nothing had changed to that moment and the strike was official. Seven La Liga teams (Villarreal, Real Sociedad, Athletic Bilbao, Espanyol, Zaragoza, Sevilla and Málaga) had made official their decision about playing that matchday as usual, presenting an interim measure before a court of Madrid. LFP Vice-president (and Sevilla FC vice-president) stepped down, citing disagreement with the decision taken by the LFP in February, calling it coercion.

After weeks of discussions without reaching any conclusion, the judge presiding over the case, Ms. Purificación Pujol, announced on 30 March that the seven La Liga clubs, along with Real Madrid and Barcelona, which joined days after, were right. Therefore, the same morning, the LFP had to organize on the fly the schedule of matchdays 30 in La Liga and 32 in the Liga Adelante.
