= 2010 Supercopa de España =

Sevilla	Barcelona
3	5
- on aggregate

First leg
Sevilla	Barcelona
3	1
- Date: 14 August 2010
- Venue: Ramón Sánchez Pizjuán, Seville
- Referee: César Muñiz Fernández
- Attendance: 38,000
- Weather: Clear; 28 °C (82 °F)

Second leg
Barcelona	Sevilla
4	0
- Date: 21 August 2010
- Venue: Camp Nou, Barcelona
- Referee: Fernando Teixeira Vitienes
- Attendance: 67,414
- Weather: Clear; 26 °C (79 °F)

The 2010 Supercopa de España was a two-legged Spanish football match-up played on 14 August and 21 August 2010. It was contested by Sevilla, the 2009–10 Copa del Rey winners, and Barcelona, the 2009–10 La Liga winners.

Barcelona won 5–3 on aggregate for their record-breaking ninth Supercopa de España title.

== Match details ==
=== First leg ===
14 August 2010
21:30 CET

Sevilla	3–1	Barcelona
Luís Fabiano 62'; Kanouté 73', 83'	Report	Ibrahimović 21'

Estadio Ramón Sánchez Pizjuán, Seville
Attendance: 38,000
Referee: César Muñiz Fernández

Sevilla	Barcelona

Sevilla:
GK	1	(Spain) Andrés Palop (c)
RB	24	(France) Abdoulay Konko
CB	2	(Argentina) Federico Fazio
CB	14	(France) Julien Escudé
LB	20	(France) Mouhamadou Dabo	(yellow card) 70'
DM	8	(Ivory Coast) Didier Zokora	(yellow card) 58'
RW	7	(Spain) Jesús Navas
CM	11	(Brazil) Renato		(substituted off) 64'
CM	6	(Ivory Coast) Romaric		(substituted off) 46'
LW	9	(Argentina) Diego Perotti
FW	10	(Brazil) Luís Fabiano		(substituted off) 70'
Substitutes:
GK	13	(Spain) Javi Varas
DF	4	(France) Sébastien Squillaci
MF	19	(Italy) Luca Cigarini	(yellow card) 72'	(substituted on) 46'
MF	15	(Spain) Alejandro Alfaro
MF	16	(Spain) Diego Capel
FW	12	(Mali) Frédéric Kanouté		(substituted on) 64'
FW	18	(Spain) Álvaro Negredo		(substituted on) 70'
Manager:
(Spain) Antonio Álvarez

Barcelona:
GK	31	(Spain) Rubén Miño
RB	2	(Brazil) Dani Alves	(yellow card) 90+1'
CB	33	(Spain) Sergi Gómez
CB	18	(Argentina) Gabriel Milito (c)		(substituted off) 81'
LB	22	(France) Eric Abidal
DM	37	(Spain) Oriol Romeu
CM	34	(Mexico) Jonathan dos Santos		(substituted off) 66'
CM	15	(Mali) Seydou Keita
RW	11	(Spain) Bojan
CF	9	(Sweden) Zlatan Ibrahimović		(substituted off) 53'
LW	19	(Brazil) Maxwell
Substitutes:
GK	38	(Spain) Oier
DF	35	(Spain) Marc Muniesa
DF	21	(Brazil) Adriano		(substituted on) 81'
MF	28	(Spain) Sergi Roberto
MF	30	(Spain) Thiago		(substituted on) 66'
FW	20	(Spain) Jeffrén
FW	10	(Argentina) Lionel Messi		(substituted on) 53'
Manager:
(Spain) Pep Guardiola

Assistant referees:

- José Manuel Fernández Miranda
- Javier Hugo Novoa Robles

Fourth official:

- Pablo Fernández Pérez

=== Second leg ===
21 August 2010
20:30 CET

Barcelona	4–0	Sevilla
Konko 14' (o.g.); Messi 25', 44', 90+1'	Report

Camp Nou, Barcelona
Attendance: 67,414
Referee: Fernando Teixeira Vitienes

Barcelona	Sevilla

Barcelona:
GK	1	(Spain) Víctor Valdés
DF	2	(Brazil) Dani Alves
DF	3	(Spain) Gerard Piqué	(yellow card) 79'
DF	22	(France) Eric Abidal
DF	19	(Brazil) Maxwell
MF	16	(Spain) Sergio Busquets
MF	6	(Spain) Xavi (c)		(substituted off) 87'
MF	15	(Mali) Seydou Keita
FW	10	(Argentina) Lionel Messi
FW	11	(Spain) Bojan		(substituted off) 56'
FW	17	(Spain) Pedro		(substituted off) 56'
Substitutes:
GK	13	(Spain) José Manuel Pinto
DF	5	(Spain) Carles Puyol
DF	18	(Argentina) Gabriel Milito
MF	8	(Spain) Andrés Iniesta		(substituted on) 56'
MF	21	(Brazil) Adriano		(substituted on) 87'
FW	9	(Sweden) Zlatan Ibrahimović
FW	7	(Spain) David Villa		(substituted on) 56'
Manager:
(Spain) Pep Guardiola

Sevilla:
GK	1	(Spain) Andrés Palop (c)
DF	5	(Spain) Fernando Navarro
DF	14	(France) Julien Escudé
DF	24	(France) Abdoulay Konko
DF	20	(France) Mouhamadou Dabo
MF	6	(Ivory Coast) Romaric	(yellow card) 33'	(substituted off) 61'
MF	7	(Spain) Jesús Navas
MF	8	(Ivory Coast) Didier Zokora
MF	15	(Spain) Alejandro Alfaro		(substituted off) 61'
FW	16	(Spain) Diego Capel		(substituted off) 61'
FW	18	(Spain) Álvaro Negredo
Substitutes:
GK	13	(Spain) Javi Varas
DF	2	(Argentina) Federico Fazio
MF	9	(Argentina) Diego Perotti		(substituted on) 61'
FW	10	(Brazil) Luís Fabiano		(substituted on) 61'
MF	11	(Brazil) Renato
DF	19	(Italy) Luca Cigarini	(yellow card) 89'	(substituted on) 61'
FW	31	(Spain) Rodri
Manager:
(Spain) Antonio Álvarez

Assistant referees:

- Victoriano Díaz Casado
- Manuel Ángel Torre Cimiano

Fourth official:

- Alberto Díaz Arias

== See also ==
- 2010–11 La Liga
- 2010–11 Copa del Rey
- 2010–11 FC Barcelona season
- 2010–11 Sevilla FC season
