= Diego Perotti =

Argentine footballer (born 1988)

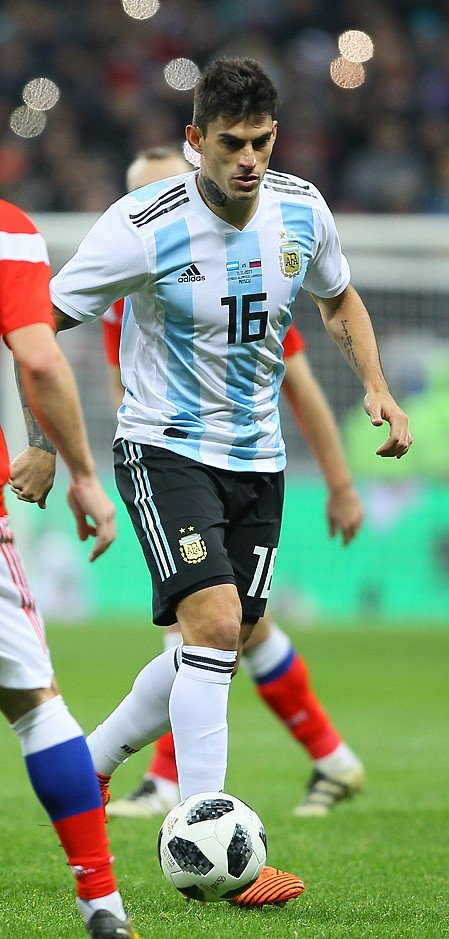
- Perotti in action for Argentina in 2017

Personal information
- Full name: Diego Perotti Almeira
- Date of birth: 26 July 1988 (age 38)
- Place of birth: Moreno, Argentina
- Height: 1.79 m (5 ft 10 in)
- Position: Winger

Youth career
- 2000–2002: Boca Juniors
- 2002–2006: Deportivo Morón

Senior career*
Years	Team	Apps	(Gls)
2006–2007	Deportivo Morón	34	(5)
2007–2009	Sevilla B	52	(3)
2009–2014	Sevilla	117	(9)
2014	→ Boca Juniors (loan)	2	(0)
2014–2016	Genoa	43	(5)
2016	→ Roma (loan)	15	(3)
2016–2020	Roma	91	(23)
2020–2021	Fenerbahçe	4	(3)
2022	Salernitana	11	(0)
Total		369	(51)

International career
2009–2018	Argentina	5	(0)
- * Club domestic league appearances and goals

Diego Perotti Almeira (born 26 July 1988) is an Argentine former professional footballer. Mainly a winger who could play with both feet, he also appeared as an attacking midfielder.

He spent the better part of his career with Sevilla, appearing in 159 competitive games over six La Liga seasons (16 goals) and winning two major titles. In February 2016 he signed with Roma in the Italian Serie A, leaving four years later.

Perotti earned five caps for Argentina.

== Club career ==
=== Sevilla ===
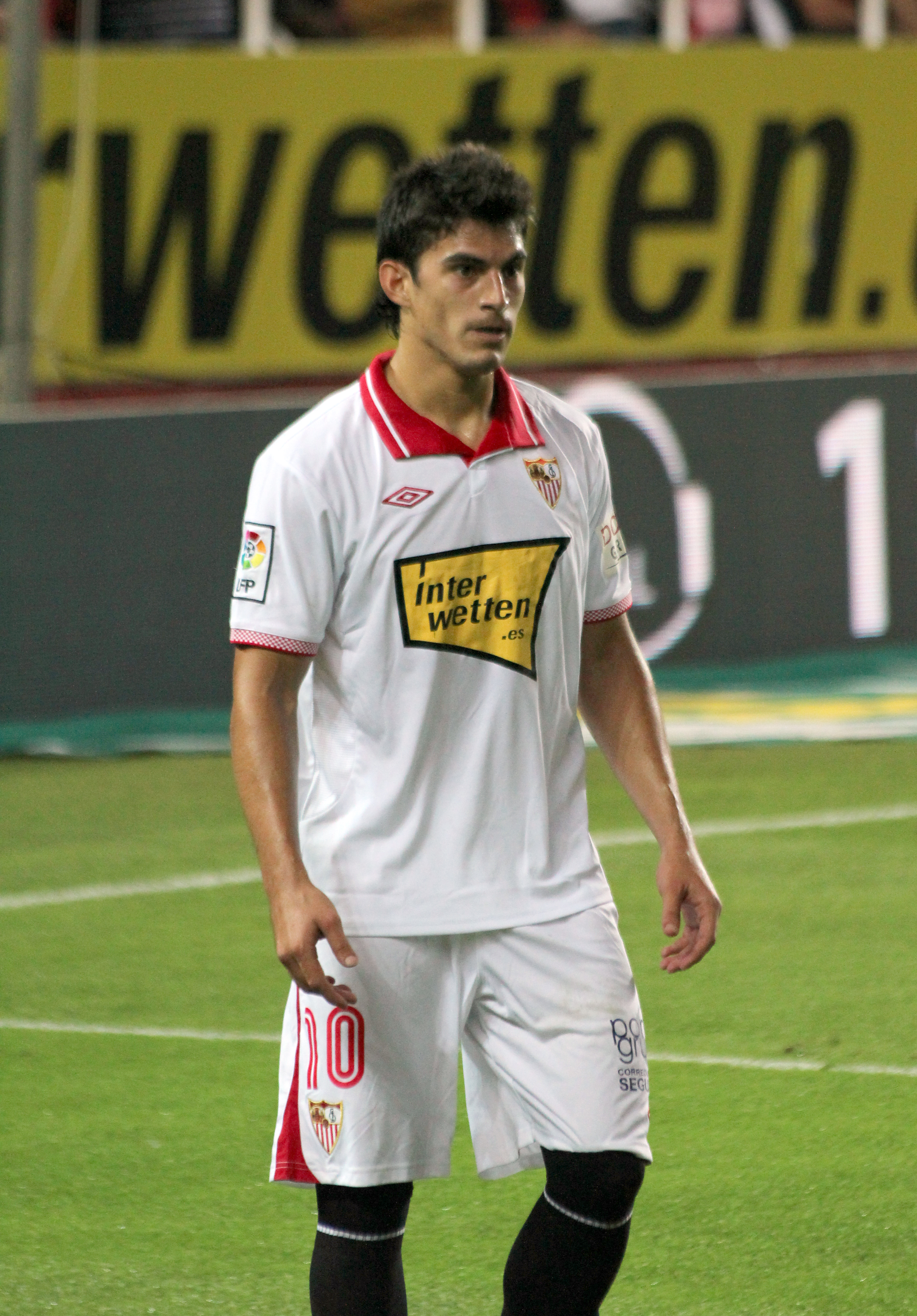
Perotti with Sevilla in 2012

Born in Moreno, Buenos Aires of Italian ancestry on his father's side, Perotti joined Spain's Sevilla FC in the summer of 2007, from Club Deportivo Morón. At first he was assigned to the Andalusians' B team which had just won promotion to Segunda División, and proved instrumental as the side retained their league status.

Perotti also started with the reserves in the 2008–09 season, receiving his first-team debut on 15 February 2009 as he appeared 15 minutes in a 2–0 win at RCD Espanyol. Often competing for a berth with another graduate, Diego Capel, his first goal for the club came against Deportivo de La Coruña on 23 May, as he scored in the 90th minute of the game to guarantee a third-place La Liga finish in the league, with the subsequent return to the UEFA Champions League.

During 2009–10, Perotti won the battle with Capel and became Sevilla's first-choice in his position, starting the campaign on a high note. On 16 March 2010, he netted against PFC CSKA Moscow in the Champions League round of 16, but the Russian team won 2–1 away and 3–2 on aggregate.

Perotti appeared in only 58 matches in all competitions from 2011 to 2014, mainly due to injuries. In February 2014, he was loaned to Boca Juniors in his homeland for six months.

=== Genoa ===
On 2 July 2014, Perotti signed for Italian club Genoa CFC after agreeing to a four-year contract. He made his competitive debut on 31 August, playing 69 minutes in a 1–2 home loss to SSC Napoli.

=== Roma ===
On 1 February 2016, Perotti joined fellow Serie A side AS Roma on loan for €1 million, with an option to buy for another €9 million. He scored his first goal six days later, the winner in a 2–1 home win over UC Sampdoria. Later that month, he signed a permanent deal until June 2019.

Perotti scored ten competitive goals in his first full season for the runners-up, adding eight in his second. In 2018–19, however, he was often sidelined with injury problems.

=== Fenerbahçe ===
Perotti moved to Turkish club Fenerbahçe S.K. on 5 October 2020 on a two-year contract, with an option to extend for another year. On 1 September 2021, however, after having contracted a rare and serious knee injury, he left by mutual consent.

=== Salernitana ===
On 2 February 2022, Perotti returned to Italy and its top tier after signing a short-term contract with newly promoted US Salernitana 1919. In September 2024, two years after his last match, the 36-year-old announced his retirement.

== International career ==
On 9 November 2009, Perotti received his maiden call-up for the Argentina national team. He made his debut five days later, playing the last ten minutes of the 2–1 friendly loss against Spain in Madrid after having come on as a substitute for FC Barcelona's Lionel Messi.

Perotti was named in a preliminary 35-man squad for the 2018 FIFA World Cup in Russia but he did not make the final cut.

== Personal life ==
Perotti's father, Hugo, was also a footballer.

== Career statistics ==
=== Club ===
Club	Season	League			Cup		International		Total	
Club	Season	Division	Apps	Goals	Apps	Goals	Apps	Goals	Apps	Goals
Deportivo Morón	2006–07	Primera B Metropolitana	34	5	—		—		34	5
Sevilla Atlético	2007–08	Segunda División	32	1	—		—		32	1
Sevilla Atlético	2008–09	Segunda División	20	2	—		—		20	2
Sevilla Atlético	Total		52	3	0	0	0	0	52	3
Sevilla	2008–09	La Liga	14	1	—		—		14	1
Sevilla	2009–10	La Liga	28	4	7	0	6	1	41	5
Sevilla	2010–11	La Liga	31	3	5	1	10	0	46	4
Sevilla	2011–12	La Liga	16	0	1	0	2	0	19	0
Sevilla	2012–13	La Liga	18	0	2	1	—		20	1
Sevilla	2013–14	La Liga	10	1	1	0	8	4	19	5
Sevilla	Total		117	9	16	2	26	5	159	16
Boca Juniors (loan)	2013–14	Argentine Primera División	2	0	—		—		2	0
Genoa	2014–15	Serie A	27	4	1	0	—		28	4
Genoa	2015–16	Serie A	16	1	1	0	—		17	1
Genoa	Total		43	5	2	0	0	0	45	5
Roma (loan)	2015–16	Serie A	15	3	—		2	0	17	3
Roma	2016–17	Serie A	32	8	4	0	9	2	45	10
Roma	2017–18	Serie A	25	5	1	0	9	3	35	8
Roma	2018–19	Serie A	13	5	0	0	2	0	15	5
Roma	2019–20	Serie A	21	5	1	0	4	1	26	6
Roma	Total		106	26	6	0	26	6	138	32
Fenerbahçe	2020–21	Süper Lig	4	3	0	0	0	0	4	3
Salernitana	2021–22	Serie A	11	0	—		—		11	0
Career total			369	51	24	2	52	11	445	64

=== International ===
Argentina
Year	Apps	Goals
2009	1	0
2011	1	0
2017	2	0
2018	1	0
Total	5	0

== Honours ==
Sevilla

- Copa del Rey: 2009–10
- UEFA Europa League: 2013–14
- Supercopa de España runner-up: 2010
