= Gregorio Manzano =

Spanish football manager

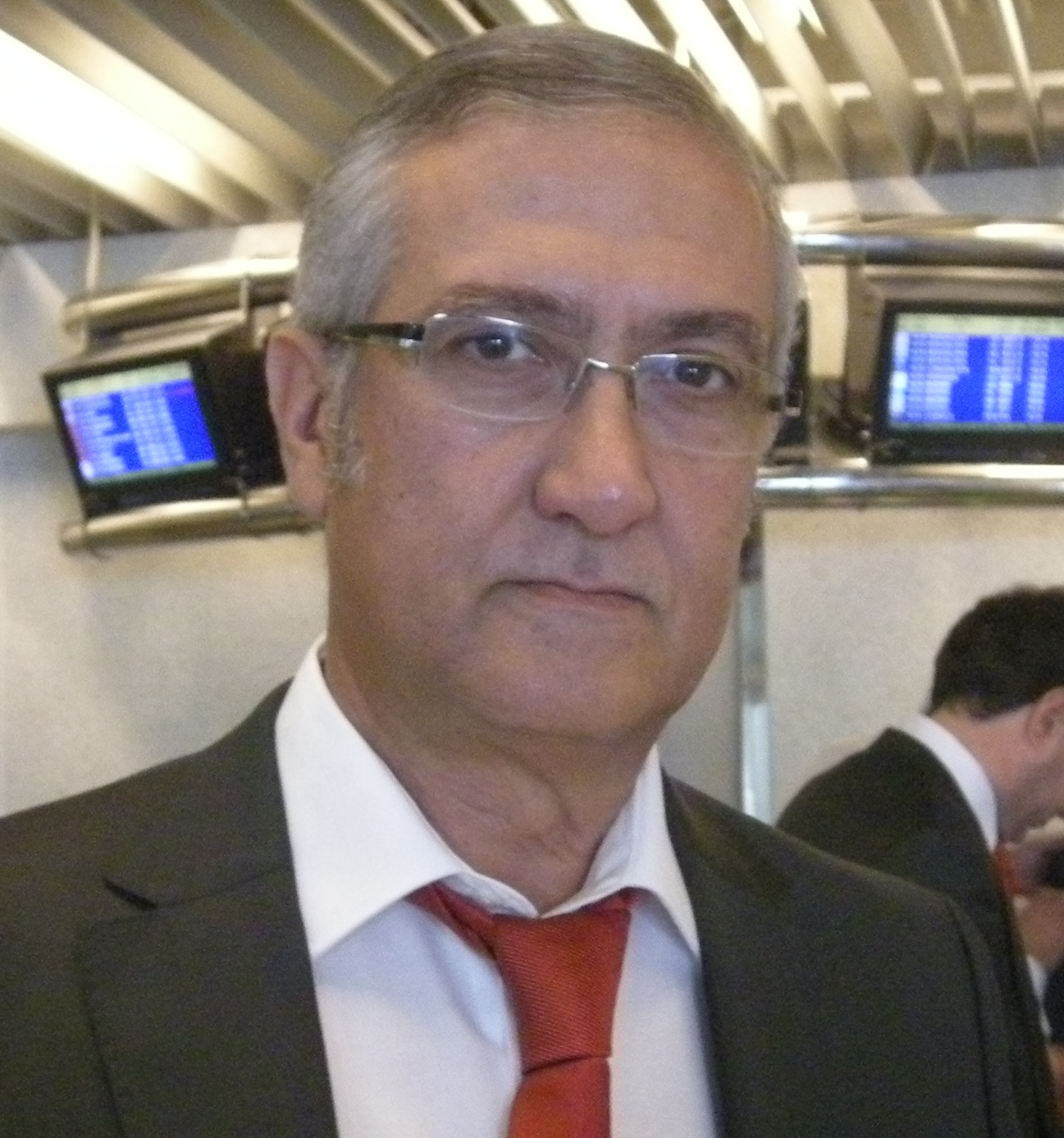
- Manzano as manager of Mallorca in 2009

Personal information
- Full name: Gregorio Manzano Ballesteros
- Date of birth: 11 March 1956 (age 70)
- Place of birth: Bailén, Spain

Managerial career
- Years: Team
- 1983–1985: Santisteban
- 1985–1986: Villacarrillo
- 1986–1988: Iliturgi
- 1988–1989: Villanueva
- 1989–1990: Úbeda
- 1990–1991: Jaén
- 1991–1993: Martos
- 1996–1998: Talavera
- 1998–1999: Toledo
- 1999–2000: Valladolid
- 2000–2001: Racing Santander
- 2001–2002: Rayo Vallecano
- 2002–2003: Mallorca
- 2003–2004: Atlético Madrid
- 2004–2005: Málaga
- 2006–2010: Mallorca
- 2010–2011: Sevilla
- 2011: Atlético Madrid
- 2013: Mallorca
- 2014–2015: Beijing Guoan
- 2015–2016: Shanghai Shenhua
- 2017–2018: Guizhou Hengfeng

Gregorio "Goyo" Manzano Ballesteros (Spanish pronunciation: [ɡɾeˈɣoɾjo manˈθano]; born 11 March 1956) is a Spanish football manager.

In a career of 35 years, he managed for 14 consecutive seasons in La Liga with seven clubs, including three spells at Mallorca and two at Atlético Madrid, winning the Copa del Rey with the former in 2003. In the 2010s, he led three teams in the Chinese Super League.

== Football career ==
=== Early career (1983–1999) ===
Born in Bailén, Jaén, Andalusia, Manzano's training career started in 1983 at the age of 27. He took charge of several teams in his native region, including Real Jaén in the Tercera División.

In 1996, Manzano signed with Talavera from Segunda División B. During his two-season spell he led the Castilla–La Mancha team to a second-place finish in their group (1996–97), and a narrow miss on promotion (1997–98). His good work there prompted the interest – and signing – from Segunda División club Toledo, which he helped retain their league status with a seventh place.

=== Six clubs in six years (1999–2005) ===
Manzano had his first La Liga experience with Real Valladolid, in 1999–2000. His new side finished eighth, and the season included a 1–0 win against Real Madrid at the Santiago Bernabéu Stadium. For the following campaign, he stayed in the top flight with Racing de Santander; in spite of a 4–0 home victory over Barcelona, the Cantabrians were relegated and the coach was fired.

After helping Rayo Vallecano finish 11th in 2001–02's top division, Manzano signed for Mallorca. Season highlights were another win at Real Madrid (5–1) and the conquest of the Copa del Rey after beating Recreativo de Huelva.

Subsequently, Manzano joined Atlético Madrid, nearly qualifying the side for the UEFA Cup after finishing seventh. After the sacking of Iñaki Sáez as Spain national team coach, he was rumoured to be one of his possible successors, but nothing came of it, and he took charge of Málaga instead.

=== Mallorca and Atlético returns and Sevilla (2005–2013) ===
On 15 February 2006, Manzano returned to Mallorca after Héctor Cúper's dismissal, and continued to work with the Balearic Islands club the following seasons. In 2009–10 they won their first ten home fixtures, eventually only losing three of 19 in the league (Sevilla, Barcelona and Real Madrid) and qualifying for the Europa League as fifth.

On 19 May 2010, it was announced Mallorca would not renew Manzano's contract despite his achievements, due to financial difficulties. He returned to football on 26 September, being appointed at Sevilla as a replacement for the fired Antonio Álvarez. His debut four days later was the first European game of his career, a 1–0 win at Borussia Dortmund in the Europa League group stage.

On 8 June 2011, after leading Sevilla to fifth place, with the subsequent Europa League qualification, Manzano returned to Atlético Madrid to replace Quique Sánchez Flores. Early into 2011–12, he and José Antonio Reyes had a serious altercation, which resulted in the player being relegated to the bench and sometimes not even selected for matchday squads.

Manzano was relieved of his duties on 22 December 2011, following a 1–0 home and 3–1 aggregate loss against Albacete in the domestic cup, with the team ranking tenth in the domestic league. On 5 February 2013, he returned to Mallorca for a third spell after Joaquín Caparrós was dismissed, as the campaign went on to end in top-tier relegation.

=== Chinese Super League (2014–2018) ===
On 11 February 2014, Manzano was appointed at Beijing Guoan of the Chinese Super League. His two years in the capital city resulted in second and fourth-place finishes, respectively.

Manzano remained working in the same competition in the ensuing years, taking Shanghai Shenhua to fourth place in his only season (2016). He arrived at Guizhou Hengfeng Zhicheng a year later, replacing Li Bing and leading the team to eighth, before being dismissed for a poor start in June 2018.

== Managerial statistics ==
As of 20 May 2018

Managerial record by team and tenure
Team	Nat	From	To	Record					Ref
Team	Nat	From	To	G	W	D	L	Win %	Ref
Santisteban	(Spain)	1 July 1983	30 June 1985	64	26	19	19	40.63	
Villacarrillo	(Spain)	1 July 1985	30 June 1986	38	16	9	13	42.11	
Iliturgi	(Spain)	1 July 1986	30 June 1988	70	31	12	27	44.29	
Villanueva	(Spain)	1 July 1988	30 June 1989	40	10	12	18	25.00	
Úbeda	(Spain)	1 July 1989	26 February 1990	25	9	9	7	36.00	
Jaén	(Spain)	26 February 1990	30 June 1991	58	28	15	15	48.28	
Martos	(Spain)	1 July 1991	30 June 1993	74	29	19	26	39.19	
Talavera	(Spain)	1 July 1996	2 July 1998	94	45	25	24	47.87	
Toledo	(Spain)	2 July 1998	24 June 1999	44	18	12	14	40.91	
Valladolid	(Spain)	24 June 1999	30 June 2000	40	14	12	14	35.00	
Racing Santander	(Spain)	5 December 2000	19 March 2001	20	7	3	10	35.00	
Rayo Vallecano	(Spain)	1 October 2001	30 June 2002	39	17	10	12	43.59	
Mallorca	(Spain)	1 July 2002	30 June 2003	47	19	14	14	40.43	
Atlético Madrid	(Spain)	23 July 2003	25 May 2004	44	17	12	15	38.64	
Málaga	(Spain)	13 June 2004	11 January 2005	20	5	3	12	25.00	
Mallorca	(Spain)	15 February 2006	19 May 2010	191	78	50	63	40.84	
Sevilla	(Spain)	27 September 2010	8 June 2011	48	24	7	17	50.00	
Atlético Madrid	(Spain)	8 June 2011	22 December 2011	28	13	5	10	46.43	
Mallorca	(Spain)	5 February 2013	5 June 2013	16	5	4	7	31.25	
Beijing Guoan	(China)	11 February 2014	26 November 2015	81	46	19	16	56.79	
Shanghai Shenhua	(China)	18 December 2015	9 November 2016	36	16	12	8	44.44	
Guizhou Hengfeng Zhicheng	(China)	30 April 2017	7 June 2018	37	13	5	19	35.14	
Total				1,154	486	288	380	42.11	—

== Honours ==
Mallorca

- Copa del Rey: 2002–03

Individual

- Don Balón Award – Coach of the Year: 2008
- Chinese Football Association Coach of the Year: 2014

== See also ==
- List of football managers with the most matches
