= Diego Capel =

Spanish footballer (born 1988)

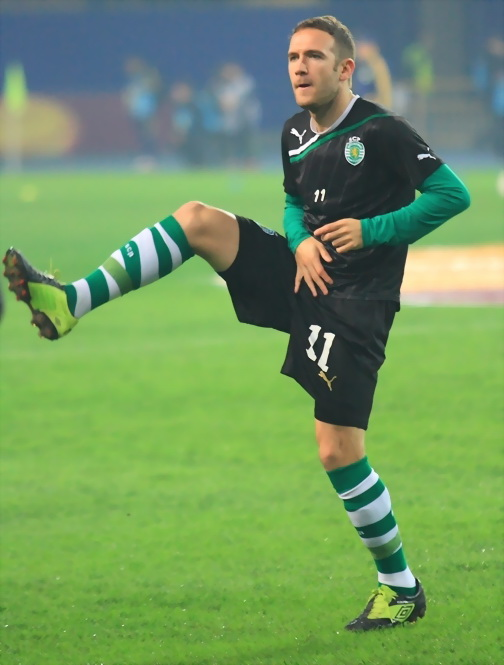
- Capel with Sporting CP in 2012

Personal information
- Full name: Diego Ángel Capel Trinidad
- Date of birth: 16 February 1988 (age 38)
- Place of birth: Albox, Spain
- Height: 1.73 m (5 ft 8 in)
- Position: Winger

Youth career
- 1998–2000: Olula
- 2000: Barcelona
- 2001–2002: Olula
- 2002–2003: Oriente
- 2003–2004: Sevilla

Senior career*
Years	Team	Apps	(Gls)
2004–2007	Sevilla B	84	(7)
2004–2011	Sevilla	126	(6)
2011–2015	Sporting CP	99	(10)
2015–2016	Genoa	21	(0)
2016–2017	Anderlecht	15	(1)
2018–2019	Extremadura	14	(0)
2020	Birkirkara	2	(1)
2022	Irodotos	11	(0)
Total		372	(25)

International career
2004	Spain U16	3	(0)
2004–2005	Spain U17	14	(2)
2006–2007	Spain U19	12	(0)
2007	Spain U20	6	(2)
2007–2011	Spain U21	25	(5)
2012	Spain U23	1	(0)
2008	Spain	2	(0)
Medal record
Men's football
Representing Spain
UEFA European Under-17 Championship
Runner-up	2004 France
- * Club domestic league appearances and goals

Diego Ángel Capel Trinidad (Spanish pronunciation: [ˈdjeɣo kaˈpel]; born 16 February 1988) is a Spanish former professional footballer who played as a left winger.

He made his senior debut with Sevilla at 16, going on to appear in 173 competitive matches for the club over seven La Liga seasons (12 goals) and win four major trophies, including two UEFA Cups. In 2011, he signed for Sporting CP, totalling 142 games and winning the 2014–15 Taça de Portugal; subsequently, he had a nomadic career.

Capel earned 60 caps for Spain across all age groups, representing the under-21s in two European Championships. He made his full debut in 2008.

== Club career ==
=== Sevilla ===
Groomed in Sevilla's youth system (after a brief spell at Barcelona), Capel was born in Albox, Province of Almería, and he made his first professional appearance aged only 16, playing three minutes in a 2–1 home win against Atlético Madrid on 24 October 2004. In the following seasons, he would alternate between the A and B teams, playing four further games in 2005–06 with the main squad; on 1 December 2005, he appeared 18 minutes in the Andalusians' 3–1 victory over Vitória de Guimarães also at the Ramón Sánchez Pizjuán Stadium, in an eventual victorious campaign in the UEFA Cup.

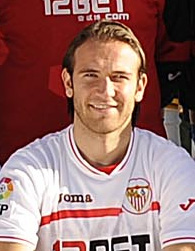
Capel with Sevilla in 2010

Capel became first-choice in the 2007–08 season due to the death of another left-footed winger, Antonio Puerta, in late August. He scored his first goal in La Liga on 9 February 2008, in a 1–1 home draw with Barcelona. The previous month, he had netted in a Copa del Rey tie against the same opponent (also 1–1 and in Seville).

In June 2008, Premier League's Tottenham Hotspur were linked with a £12.5 million bid for Capel. He admitted he would consider leaving Sevilla to "grow as a footballer", if the clubs could agree on a signing fee, but nothing came of it. Also at the end of the league campaign, Barcelona-based daily Sport further speculated that Real Madrid were considering Capel as a potential replacement for the recently departed Robinho, but no move ever materialised.

In the 2009–10 campaign, Capel lost his position to Argentine Diego Perotti, but still managed to feature in 29 matches – one goal in a 5–1 win at Racing de Santander– as Sevilla edged Mallorca for the fourth position, with the subsequent qualification for the UEFA Champions League. Additionally, on 19 May 2010, he opened the score at the Camp Nou in a 2–0 defeat of Atlético in the final of the domestic cup.

Capel appeared again regularly in 2010–11, playing 27 league games and starting in 17 as the team finished in fifth position.

=== Sporting CP ===
On 18 July 2011, Capel's uncle Carioca acknowledged negotiations between Sevilla and Sporting CP for the transfer of the player for €6 million and a five-year contract, although the fee agreed was eventually €3.5 million with a €30 million buyout clause. He made his debut for his new club on the 30th, playing the second half of a 3–0 friendly home loss to Valencia.

Capel scored his first goal for Sporting on 2 October 2011, in a 1–0 Primeira Liga away win over Vitória de Guimarães. On the 24th, in the same competition, he netted twice in a 6–1 home rout of Gil Vicente in what was the Lions' ninth straight official win.

On 19 April 2012, Capel scored his seventh competitive goal of the season, helping the hosts come from behind to win 2–1 against Athletic Bilbao in the Europa League semi-finals first leg. He was part of the squad that won the Taça de Portugal in 2015, but his input consisted of the 5–0 victory at Espinho in the fourth round.

=== Genoa and Anderlecht ===
On 18 August 2015, as his minutes at Sporting were dwindling dramatically, Capel signed for Genoa in Italy for a reported fee of €1.3 million, as the former retained 50% of his rights regarding any future transfer fee the latter received. The following 4 August 2016, he switched countries again, signing a two-year deal with the option for a third at Anderlecht in the Belgian Pro League; in the winter transfer window the former were looking to sell him and he was eventually released in August 2017, having made 25 competitive appearances and scored two goals.

In March 2018, Capel turned down an approach from EFL League Two club Notts County.

=== Later career ===
On 4 August 2018, after more than a year without a club, Capel moved to Segunda División side Extremadura on a two-year contract. He was joined there by his former Sevilla teammate José Antonio Reyes, who died in a car crash in June 2019; the following month, he left the team from Almendralejo having played just 382 minutes.

Capel moved abroad again in January 2020, to Birkirkara of the Maltese Premier League. He signed until the end of the season with the option of one more, but left in March as the COVID-19 pandemic erupted.

In February 2022, after nearly two years of inactivity, the 34-year-old Capel joined Super League Greece 2 club Irodotos. On 24 October 2023, exactly 19 years after his professional debut, he announced his retirement.

== International career ==
After having helped Spain win the 2006 UEFA European Under-19 Championship, Capel played in the 2007 FIFA World Cup with the under-20 team, scoring in injury time in the first game against Uruguay for the final 2–2. He helped the country progress to the quarter-finals where they were knocked out by the Czech Republic, and subsequently moved to the under-21s.

Capel made his debut for the senior side on 20 August 2008, playing the second half of a friendly with Denmark and setting up two goals in the 3–0 away win.

== Career statistics ==
Club	Season	League			National cup (Note: Includes Copa del Rey, Taça de Portugal, Belgian Cup, Maltese FA Trophy)		League cup (Note: Includes Taça da Liga)		Europe		Other		Total	
Club	Season	Division	Apps	Goals	Apps	Goals	Apps	Goals	Apps	Goals	Apps	Goals	Apps	Goals
Sevilla Atlético	2004–05	Segunda División B	19	1	—		—		—		2 (Note: Appearances in Segunda División B play-offs)	0	21	1
Sevilla Atlético	2005–06	Segunda División B	30	0	—		—		—		4	0	34	0
Sevilla Atlético	2006–07	Segunda División B	35	6	—		—		—		3	1	38	7
Sevilla Atlético	Total		84	7	—		—		—		9	1	93	8
Sevilla	2004–05	La Liga	3	0	0	0	—		—		—		3	0
Sevilla	2005–06	La Liga	4	0	0	0	—		1 (Note: Appearances in UEFA Cup)	0	—		5	0
Sevilla	2006–07	La Liga	0	0	0	0	—		1	0	—		1	0
Sevilla	2007–08	La Liga	31	3	3	1	—		8 (Note: Appearances in UEFA Champions League)	0	1 (Note: Appearance in UEFA Super Cup)	0	43	4
Sevilla	2008–09	La Liga	32	2	6	0	—		3	1	—		41	3
Sevilla	2009–10	La Liga	29	1	7	3	—		6	0	—		42	4
Sevilla	2010–11	La Liga	27	0	4	1	—		6 (Note: One appearance in UEFA Champions League, five appearances in UEFA Europa League)	0	1 (Note: Appearance in Supercopa de España)	0	38	1
Sevilla	Total		126	6	20	5	—		25	1	2	0	173	12
Sporting CP	2011–12	Primeira Liga	26	4	7	1	3	1	13 (Note: Appearances in UEFA Europa League)	1	—		49	7
Sporting CP	2012–13	Primeira Liga	26	5	1	0	2	0	7	0	—		36	5
Sporting CP	2013–14	Primeira Liga	26	1	2	2	3	0	—		—		31	3
Sporting CP	2014–15	Primeira Liga	21	0	1	1	0	0	4	0	—		26	1
Sporting CP	Total		99	10	11	4	8	1	24	1	—		142	16
Genoa	2015–16	Serie A	21	0	0	0	—		—		—		21	0
Anderlecht	2016–17	Belgian Pro League	15	1	2	0	—		8	1	—		25	2
Extremadura	2018–19	Segunda División	14	0	1	0	—		—		—		15	0
Birkirkara	2019–20	Maltese Premier League	2	1	1	0	—		—		—		3	1
Irodotos	2021–22	Super League Greece 2	11	0	0	0	—		—		—		11	0
Career total			372	25	35	9	8	1	57	3	11	1	483	39

== Honours ==
Sevilla

- Copa del Rey: 2009–10
- Supercopa de España: 2007; runner-up 2010
- UEFA Cup: 2005–06, 2006–07
- UEFA Super Cup runner-up: 2007

Sporting CP

- Taça de Portugal: 2014–15; runner-up: 2011–12

Anderlecht

- Belgian Pro League: 2016–17

Spain U19

- UEFA European Under-19 Championship: 2006

Spain U21

- UEFA European Under-21 Championship: 2011

Individual

- SJPF Player of the Month: October 2011
