= Manolo Gaspar =

Spanish footballer

Personal information
- Full name: Manuel Gaspar Haro
- Date of birth: 3 February 1981 (age 45)
- Place of birth: Málaga, Spain
- Height: 1.76 m (5 ft 9 in)
- Position: Right-back

Youth career
- Málaga

Senior career*
Years	Team	Apps	(Gls)
2001–2004	Málaga B	109	(1)
2004–2006	Almería	65	(0)
2006–2008	Levante	28	(0)
2008–2011	Málaga	40	(0)
2011–2012	Cartagena	20	(0)
2013	Olympiakos Nicosia	10	(1)
2013–2015	El Palo	54	(0)
Total		326	(2)
- * Club domestic league appearances and goals

Manuel 'Manolo' Gaspar Haro (born 3 February 1981) is a Spanish former footballer who played as a right-back.

== Club career ==
Born in Málaga, Andalusia, Gaspar started playing professionally with hometown Málaga CF's reserves, then spent two Segunda División seasons with another team in the region, UD Almería, being named 2005–06's best right-back whilst at the service of the latter.

For 2006–07, upon Levante UD's return to La Liga, Gaspar signed for the Valencian Community side. He appeared scarcely over two seasons, facing relegation in his second with the club immersed in a precarious financial situation.

Gaspar returned to Málaga in July 2008, being pretty much absent of the lineups for most part of the campaign but being heavily used in the final months. He again featured regularly in 2009–10, mainly due to injuries to teammates; however, on 3 April 2010, it was announced that he would miss the rest of the season because of an inflamed appendix, which was successfully operated and removed.

Gaspar continued to be used exclusively as a backup in 2010–11, by both Jesualdo Ferreira and his successor Manuel Pellegrini. On 4 July 2011, aged 30, he left Málaga and returned to the second tier, joining FC Cartagena.

Following an unassuming spell in the Cypriot First Division, Gaspar signed with CD El Palo from Segunda División B. In 2014, still as an active player, he returned to Málaga in directorial capacities.
