= IB3 (TV channel) =

- Country: Spain
- Broadcast area: Balearic Islands
- Headquarters: C / Madalena, 21 – Polígon Son Bugadelles; 07180 Santa Ponça – Calvià

Programming
- Language: Catalan
- Picture format: 1080i HDTV

Ownership
- Owner: Ens Públic de Radiotelevisió de les Illes Balears
- Sister channels: IB3 Global

History
- Launched: 5 September 2005

Links
- Website: www.ib3tv.com

Availability

Streaming media
- IB3.org: Watch live

IB3 (Balearic Catalan: [ˈi ˈbe ˈtɾəs], also [ˈi ˈbe ˈtɾɛs]) is a publicly funded Balearic television station.

IB3 began test transmissions on 1 March 2005—the holiday known as "Balearic Islands Day"—with the first regular broadcast beginning on 5 September 2005.

It is owned by the Ens Públic de Radiotelevisió de les Illes Balears and Federación de Organismos de Radio y Televisión Autonómicos (FORTA). The studios are located in Calvià, a municipality of the island of Mallorca, near Palma.

Initially, the channel's transmissions were in Catalan (informative and children's programming) and Castilian (films, series and documentaries). Currently, the channel airs all its programming in Catalan only.
