= Romaric (footballer) =

Ivorian footballer (born 1983)

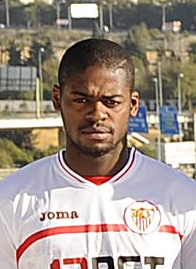
- Romaric with Sevilla in 2010

Personal information
- Full name: Koffi Christian Romaric N'Dri
- Date of birth: 4 June 1983 (age 43)
- Place of birth: Abidjan, Ivory Coast
- Height: 1.87 m (6 ft 2 in)
- Position: Midfielder

Team information
- Current team: AFAD Djékanou (manager)

Youth career
- ASEC Mimosas

Senior career*
Years	Team	Apps	(Gls)
2001–2003	ASEC Mimosas		
2003–2005	Beveren	44	(18)
2005–2008	Le Mans	89	(7)
2008–2012	Sevilla	81	(3)
2011–2012	→ Espanyol (loan)	28	(3)
2012–2013	Zaragoza	12	(0)
2013–2015	Bastia	60	(4)
2015–2016	Omonia	30	(0)
2016	NorthEast United	12	(2)
Total		356	(37)

International career
2005–2013	Ivory Coast	44	(4)

Managerial career
- 2022–: AFAD Djékanou
- * Club domestic league appearances and goals

Koffi Christian Romaric N'Dri (born 4 June 1983), commonly known as Romaric, is an Ivorian former professional footballer and current manager of Ligue 1 club AFAD Djékanou. A versatile midfielder, he could play as either a defensive or central midfielder.

He played in six countries, mainly France and Spain. He made 149 Ligue 1 appearances in the former for Le Mans and Bastia, and played 121 La Liga games in the latter for Sevilla, Espanyol and Zaragoza.

In an eight-year international career for the Ivory Coast, Romaric went to two World Cups and three Africa Cup of Nations tournaments, finishing as runners-up in the 2008 edition of the latter.

== Club career ==
=== Early years ===
Born in Abidjan, Romaric started his career at the famed youth academy of hometown club ASEC Mimosas, moving to K.S.K. Beveren in 2003.

In his second season in Belgium, he scored a career-best 13 goals in 32 games, but his team narrowly avoided relegation from the Pro League.

=== Le Mans ===
In May 2005, Romaric joined French club Le Mans UC72. In late August, however, he was involved in a serious car accident, fracturing his collarbone and taking a blow to the head close to Liège, in Belgium.

Romaric quickly recovered from his injuries and established himself in the team's starting eleven. In 2006–07, he scored five goals in 35 matches, as Le Mans easily retained its Ligue 1 status (12th position), and was also linked with a move to Paris Saint-Germain as a replacement for departing Vikash Dhorasoo in the January transfer window – nothing came of it eventually; in his last season, he reunited at the Stade Léon-Bollée with compatriot Gervinho, a former teammate at Beveren.

=== Sevilla ===
On 21 May 2008, Romaric signed for Sevilla FC in Spain, penning a four-year contract for a fee believed to be around €8 and 10 million, and linking up with countryman Arouna Koné. He scored his first La Liga goal on 7 December, in a 4–3 away win against Real Madrid, and finished his first season with 36 matches (30 starts), as the Andalusians were ranked in third position.

Following the arrival of another Ivorian midfielder, Didier Zokora, Romaric saw his minutes significantly decreased. On 9 January 2010, he netted in a 1–2 home loss against Racing de Santander.

Romaric joined fellow league team RCD Espanyol on a season-long loan at the end of the 2011 summer transfer window. Included in the agreement was an option to make the transfer permanent at the end of the campaign, with the player signing a three-year contract.

=== Later career ===
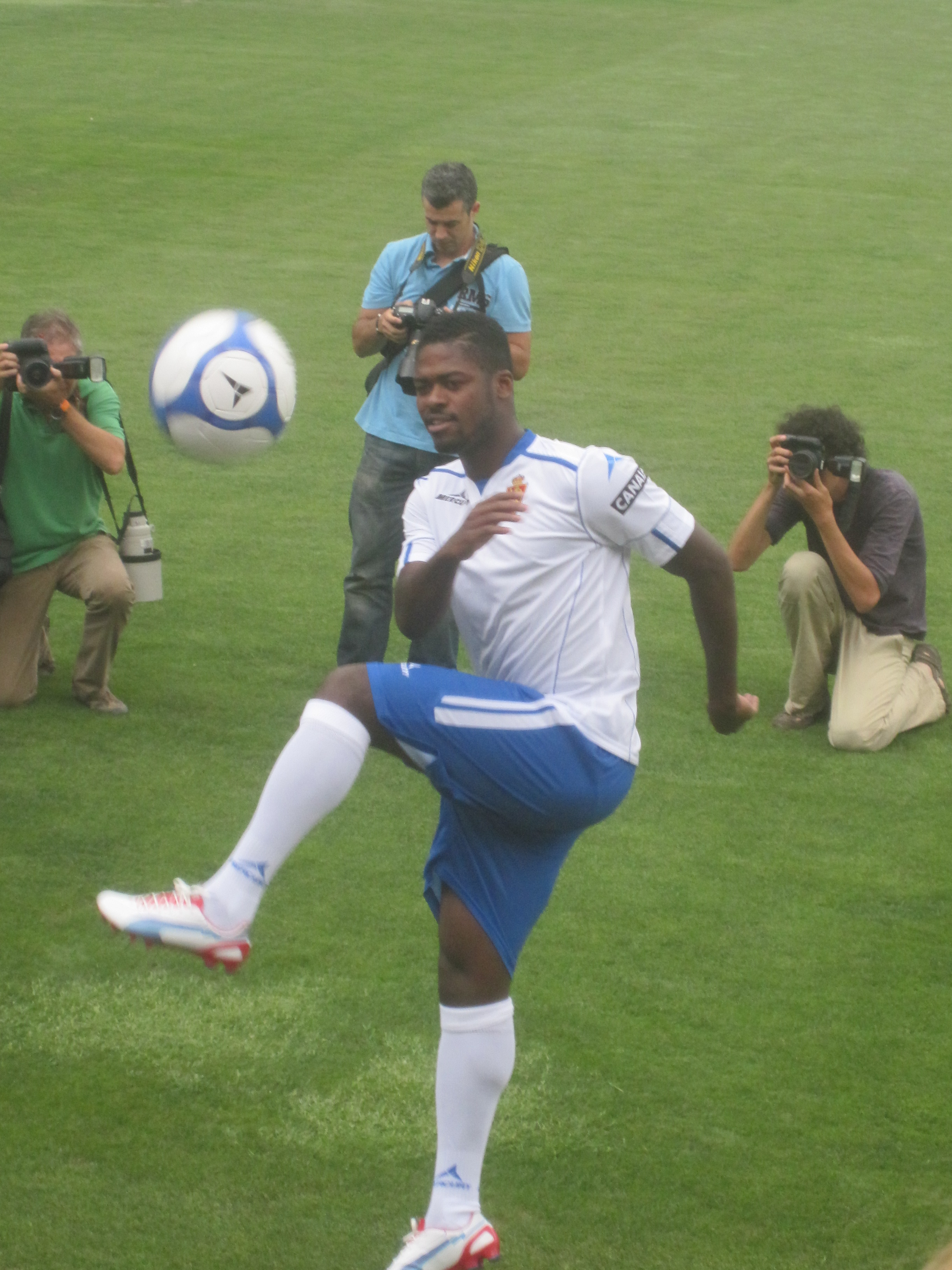
Romaric being presented at Zaragoza

On 26 July 2012, Romaric negotiated a release from Sevilla, and signed a two-year deal with fellow league team Real Zaragoza under his former manager Manolo Jiménez. He played only 14 total matches, as the Aragonese ended the season with relegation, and was sent off in the ninth minute of a 1–0 home loss to Getafe CF on 6 October for a foul on Mehdi Lacen.

Romaric returned to France and its top flight on 1 August 2013, joining SC Bastia for two years with the option of a third and reuniting with his Le Mans boss Frédéric Hantz. He played the first four matches in the Corsicans' 2014–15 Coupe de la Ligue campaign, but was an unused substitute for the final, a 4–0 loss to Paris Saint-Germain at the Stade de France.

After being released by the side, he remained a free agent through the summer, before moving on 10 September 2015 to AC Omonia of the Cypriot First Division for the rest of the season. The Nicosia-based club reached the final of the domestic cup, losing 2–1 to Apollon Limassol.

On 14 August 2016, Romaric moved countries again, joining NorthEast United FC for the upcoming edition of the Indian Super League.

== International career ==
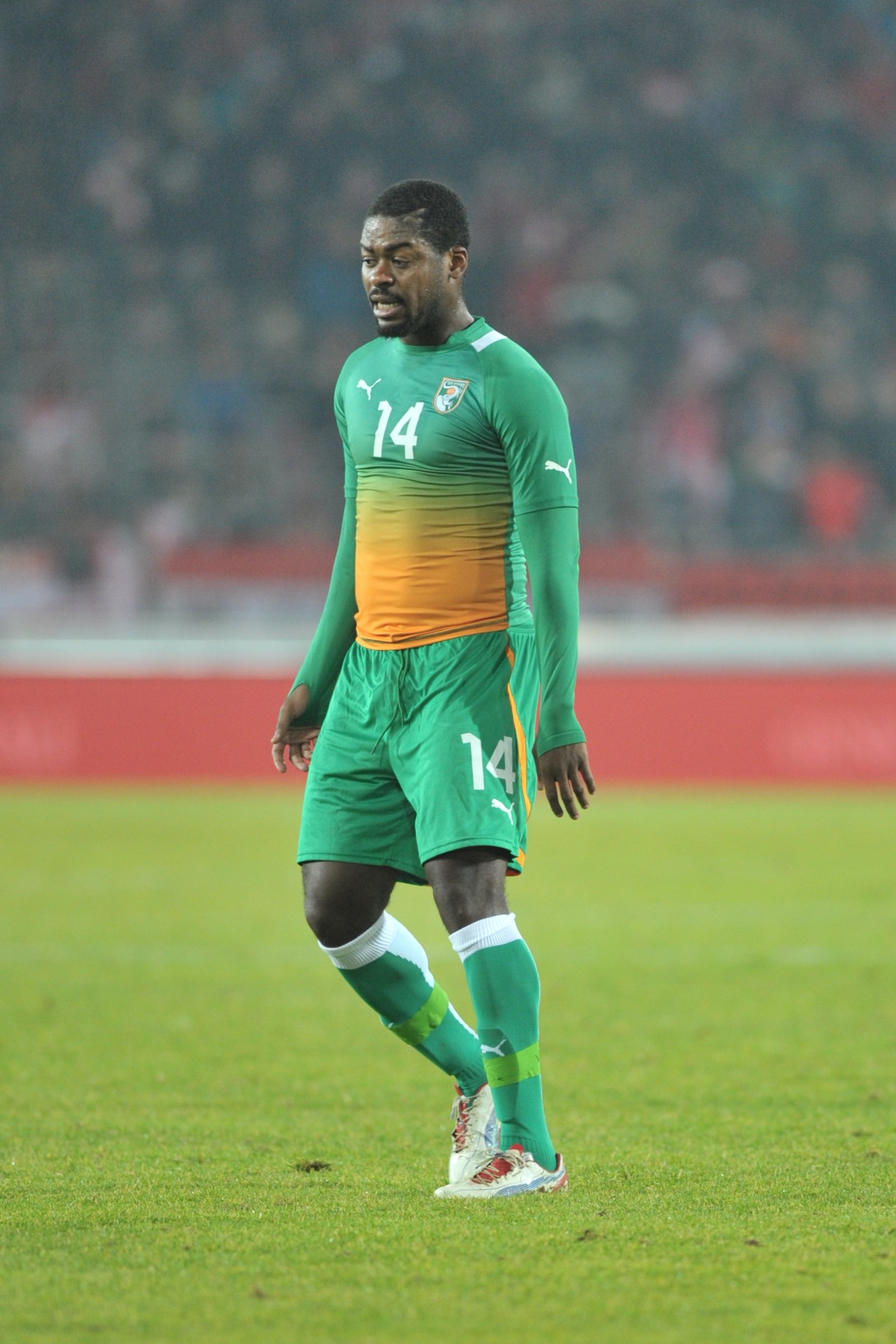
Romaric playing for Ivory Coast in 2012

Romaric's debut for the Ivory Coast came on 17 August 2005, in a 0–3 friendly loss with France in Montpellier. He was called up for the following year's FIFA World Cup squad, where he appeared in the 1–2 group stage defeat against the Netherlands.

Romaric played for the Elephants in the 2006 Africa Cup of Nations, with the tournament ending with a runner-up position after a final loss to hosts Egypt. He scored his first international goal on 29 March 2009, opening 5–0 home win after just 28 seconds against Malawi for the 2010 World Cup qualifiers; the result was overshadowed by a crush that killed 19 spectators.

Romaric was selected for the final stages in South Africa, where he played in all the games in another group stage exit, netting against North Korea at Mbombela Stadium (3–0). However, he was not included in the squad for the 2012 Africa Cup of Nations, in which the Ivory Coast finished as runners-up.

=== International goals ===
List of international goals scored by Romaric
#	Date	Venue	Opponent	Score	Result	Competition
1.	29 March 2009	Ouagadougou, Burkina Faso	Malawi	1–0	5–0	2010 World Cup qualification
2.	7 June 2009	Conakry, Guinea	Guinea	2–1	2–1	2010 World Cup qualification
3.	25 June 2010	Nelspruit, South Africa	North Korea	2–0	3–0	2010 FIFA World Cup
4.	9 October 2010	Bujumbura, Burundi	Burundi	1–0	1–0	2012 Africa Cup of Nations qualification

== Coaching career ==
In November 2017, Romaric was named an assistant coach at ASEC Mimosas. He was in charge of the reserve team until ASEC Mimosas dissolved their reserve squad in September 2020.

In 2021, Romaric was named manager for Ivorian third division side Zoman FC. He earned them promotion to the second division in his first season in charge.

In March 2022, Romaric was appointed manager for AFAD Djekanou, in the Ivorian Ligue 1.

== Managerial statistics ==
As of 16 March 2024

Managerial record by team and tenure
Team	Nat	From	To	Record							
Team	Nat	From	To	G	W	D	L	GF	GA	GD	Win %
AFAD Djékanou	(Ivory Coast)	11 March 2022	Present	73	31	27	15	73	54	+19	42.47
Total				73	31	27	15	73	54	+19	42.47

== Honours ==
Sevilla

- Copa del Rey: 2009–10
- Supercopa de España runner-up: 2010

Ivory Coast

- Africa Cup of Nations runner-up: 2006
