= Abdoulay Konko =

French footballer (born 1984)

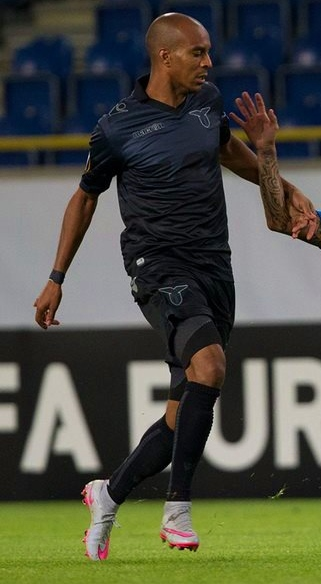
- Konko playing for Lazio in 2015

Personal information
- Date of birth: 9 March 1984 (age 42)
- Place of birth: Marseille, Bouches-du-Rhône, France
- Height: 1.84 m (6 ft 0 in)
- Position: Right-back

Team information
- Current team: Genoa (youth coach)

Youth career
- Martigues
- 2001–2002: Genoa

Senior career*
Years	Team	Apps	(Gls)
2002–2006	Juventus	0	(0)
2004–2006	→ Crotone (loan)	74	(7)
2006–2007	Siena	14	(1)
2007–2008	Genoa	37	(2)
2008–2010	Sevilla	44	(3)
2011	Genoa	13	(0)
2011–2016	Lazio	92	(1)
2016–2017	Atalanta	10	(0)
Total		284	(14)

Managerial career
- 2022: Genoa (caretaker)
- * Club domestic league appearances and goals

Abdoulay Konko (born 9 March 1984) is a French football coach and former player who played as a right-back. He is a youth coach at Genoa.

== Playing career ==
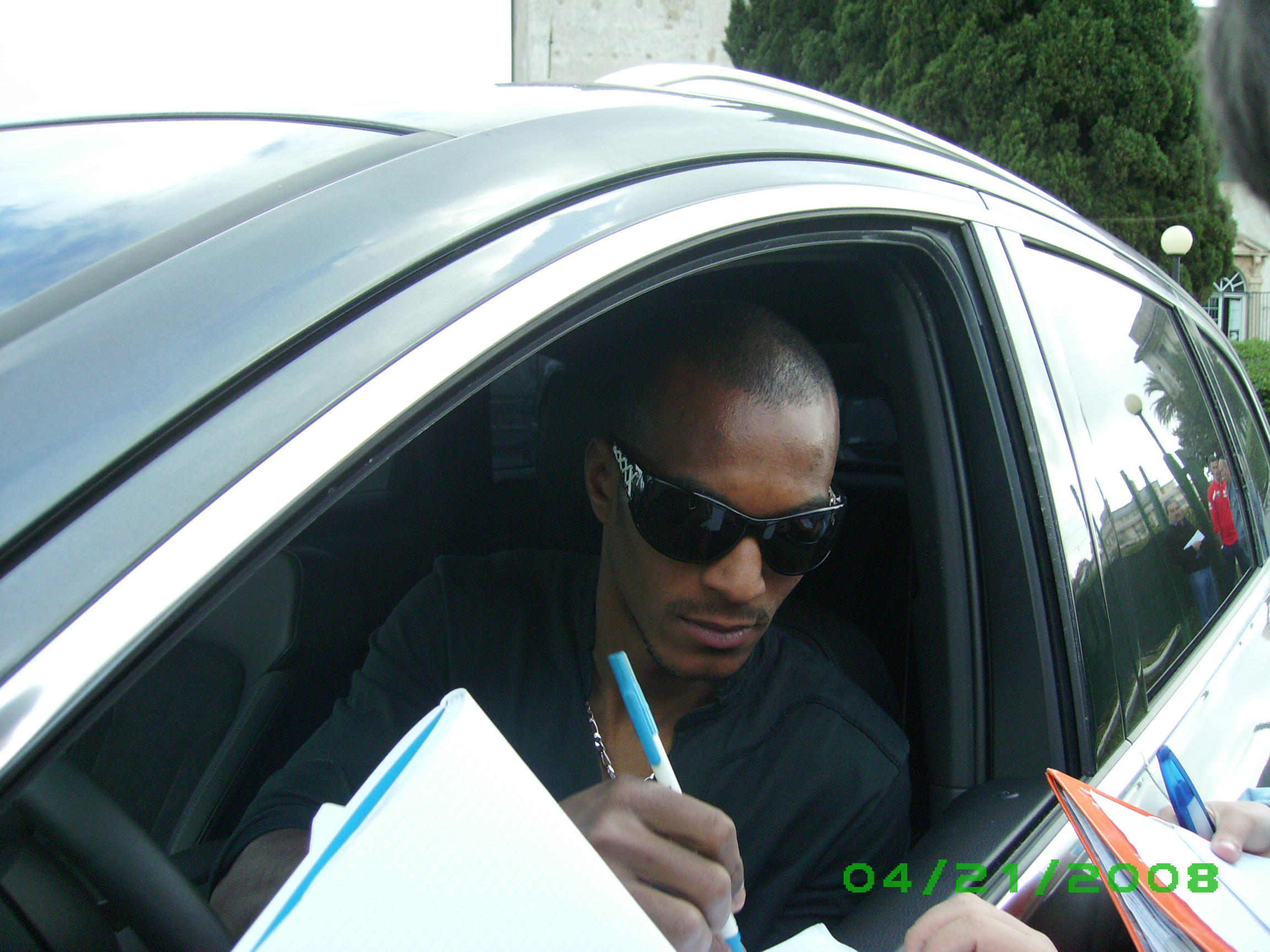
Konko signing an autograph.

=== Juventus ===
A youth product of Juventus, Konko was loaned to Crotone with Giovanni Bartolucci, Tomas Guzman, Antonio Mirante, Matteo Paro and Daniele Gastaldello in 2004 and with Guzman in 2005.

He was sold in co-ownership deal to Siena in 2006, valued €500,000, and moved along with Bartolucci for €500 and Andrea Masiello for €350,000, as well as Douglas Packer on loan. On the opening game of the season, Konko made his debut for the club, coming on for Luca Antonini, in a 2–1 win over ChievoVerona; then scored his first goal in a 3–1 win over Messina on 14 October 2006. On 10 December 2006, Konko received a red card, after a second bookable offence, in a 0–0 draw against Sampdoria.

=== Genoa ===
On 25 January 2007, Konko was sold by Juventus to Genoa for €1 million as part of the deal for Domenico Criscito. Konko became owned by Genoa and Siena. In June 2007 Genoa acquired Masiello but forced to sell Konko after failing to bid him from a closed tender for €823,787. (Note: Both clubs did not made a direct disclosure of the fee: Genoa disclosed the discount: €176,213 (€1 million minus €823,787); while Siena disclosed the fee to acquire Konko outright was €1,408,787 (€500,000 + €823,787 + €85,000 other fee).) In July 2007 Genoa re-acquired Konko for €1.2 million (thus cost Genoa €376,213 in net by deducting June revenue). As part of the deal, Fernando Forestieri became co-owned by Siena and Genoa for €1.7 million. On the opening game of the season, on 26 August 2007, Konko made his debut in a 3–0 defeat to AC Milan; two months on, Konko scored his first goal for the club in a 4–1 loss against Inter Milan. His second goal was followed up on 22 March 2008, in 3–2 win over Palermo six-month later, since scoring his first. Five weeks later, his third came in a 1–0 win against his former club, Siena. At the end of the season, Russian clubs CSKA Moscow and Lokomotiv Moscow confirmed their interests to sign Konko.

=== Sevilla ===
In the summer of 2008, Konko was transferred to Sevilla for €9 million and was a replacement for Daniel Alves, who joined Barcelona. Konko signed a five-year contract with Sevilla and had a €60 million release clause written into his contract. On the opening game of the season, Konko made his league debut in a 1–1 draw against Racing Santander. In the first round of UEFA Cup, Konko made his European debut in a 2–0 win over Red Bull Salzburg. On 5 October 2008, Konko provided assist for Javier Chevantón, with a cross, in a 4–0 win over Athletic Bilbao. In the first half of the season, Konko was often used in and out been used in the first team, having competed against Aquivaldo Mosquera. However, in January, Konko injured his adductor thigh, having recently recovered from an injury, similar to his thigh In late February, Konko was able to make his return in a 2–1 win over Athletic Bilbao on 28 February 2009. Three months later, towards the end of the season, Konko received a red, after a second bookable offence, in a 2–0 win over Villarreal on 3 May 2009.

The next season, with the departure of Mosquera, Konko scored his first goal for the club, in a 4–1 win over Real Zaragoza on 12 September 2009. Several weeks later, in the Champions League, Konko scored his first goal in a 4–1 win over Rangers. However, during the match, Konko made controversy when he fouled Steven Naismith in the penalty box but wasn't given. A penalty denial was criticised by Rangers manager Walter Smith. Like last season, Konko injuries was back after suffering a recurrent hip adductor injury, playing less often in the season. On 8 May 2010, Konko received a red, after a second bookable offence, in a 3–2 defeat to La Liga Champion Barcelona and miss the last game of the season.

The next season, Konko scored an own goal in a Supercopa de España second leg, in a 4–0 loss against Barcelona. Konko scored a brace in a 4–0 win over Levante on the opening game of the season. Soon after, Konko injuries happened again. On 30 October 2010, like last season, Konko received a red again, in a match against Barcelona, after a second bookable offence, in a 5–0 defeat.

=== Return to Genoa ===
On 19 January 2011, Konko returned to Genoa for €5.25 million. Konko played 13 matches in Serie A for the rossoblu, before again leaving the club.

=== Lazio ===
At the end of the season, he moved to Lazio, for €4 million, signing a five-year contract and was a replacement for Stephan Lichtsteiner, who joined Konko's former club, Juventus. On the opening game of the season, on 9 September 2011, Konko made his debut in a 2–2 draw against A.C. Milan. Five month later, Konko received a straight red card after a professional foul, in a 3–2 win over Cesena on 9 February 2012. In his first season, Konko made twenty six appearances for the club and had become a regular in the first team. The next season, Konko provided an assist for Miroslav Klose, in Europa League Qualification Round first leg, in a 2–0 win over Mura 05. Eventually, Lazio went through to the group stage. In mid November, Konko suffered an injury. On 5 January 2013, Konko scored his first goal for Lazio in a 2–1 win over Cagliari.

=== Atalanta ===
Konko signed for Atalanta as a free agent on 19 August 2016.

== Coaching career ==
In January 2021, he was hired by Genoa as the new coach of the Under-17 team.

On 15 January 2022 he was named caretaker manager in charge of the first team, following the dismissal of Andriy Shevchenko. He guided Genoa for a single Serie A game to Fiorentina; his caretaker spell ended four days later, following the appointment of Alexander Blessin as the club's new permanent head coach.

== Honours ==
Sevilla

- Copa del Rey: 2009–10

Lazio

- Coppa Italia: 2012–13
