= Antonio Álvarez (footballer, born 1955) =

Spanish footballer and manager

Personal information
- Full name: Antonio Álvarez Giráldez
- Date of birth: 10 April 1955 (age 71)
- Place of birth: Marchena, Spain
- Height: 1.86 m (6 ft 1 in)
- Position: Centre-back

Youth career
- Sevilla

Senior career*
Years	Team	Apps	(Gls)
1973–1978	Sevilla B		
1975–1988	Sevilla	297	(6)
1988–1991	Málaga	98	(4)
1991–1995	Granada	130	(6)
1992	→ Málaga (loan)	7	(0)
Total		532	(16)

International career
1983	Spain amateur	3	(0)
1981	Spain B	2	(0)

Managerial career
- 2000–2008: Sevilla (assistant)
- 2010: Sevilla
- * Club domestic league appearances and goals

Antonio Álvarez Giráldez (born 10 April 1955) is a Spanish former football central defender and manager.

== Playing career ==
Born in Marchena, Seville, and a product of hometown Sevilla FC's youth system, Álvarez made his La Liga debut during the 1975–76 season, scoring once in eight games as the team finished in 11th position. In the following decade he would be more often than not an undisputed starter for the Andalusians, eventually playing 370 matches all competitions comprised.

At the end of the 1987–88 campaign, still with Sevilla in the top division, the 33-year-old Álvarez – having made just 17 league appearances – opted to move on, and signed with neighbouring CD Málaga. In summer 1991 he joined another club in the region, Segunda División B's Granada CF, eventually retiring at the age of 40.

== Coaching career ==
After retiring, Álvarez eventually worked again with main club Sevilla, serving as assistant under several coaches, the first Joaquín Caparrós in 2000. He was part of Juande Ramos' staff as they won two consecutive UEFA Cups and one Copa del Rey, amongst other accolades.

In March 2010, after roughly two years as Sevilla's director of football, Álvarez replaced former teammate Manolo Jiménez as first-team manager following his dismissal, after Luis Aragonés, recently departed from Beşiktaş JK, declined an offer to coach the side. He led the team throughout the last ten fixtures of the season, winning six, losing four and robbing RCD Mallorca of the fourth place which qualified for the UEFA Champions League in the last minute of the last matchday, a 3–2 away win against neighbours UD Almería.

On 19 May 2010, Álvarez was also on the bench as Sevilla won the Spanish Cup, with goals from youth graduates Diego Capel and Jesús Navas (2–0). Four months later, following two losses and one draw in three games (two in the league and one in the UEFA Europa League), he was sacked.

== Managerial statistics ==
As of 26 September 2010

Team	Nation	From	To	Record				
Team	Nation	From	To	Played	W	D	L	Win %
Sevilla	(Spain)	26 March 2010	27 September 2010	21	10	2	9	47.6

== Honours ==
=== Manager ===
- Copa del Rey: 2009–10
- Supercopa de España runner-up: 2010
