= Mouhamadou Dabo =

Senegalese footballer (born 1986)

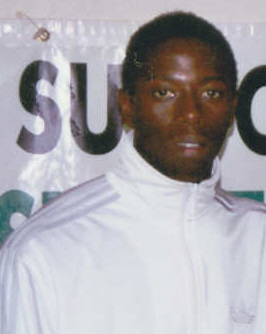
- Dabo in 2006

Personal information
- Date of birth: 28 November 1986 (age 39)
- Place of birth: Dakar, Senegal
- Height: 1.76 m (5 ft 9 in)
- Position: Full-back

Youth career
- Yeggo
- Saint-Étienne

Senior career*
Years	Team	Apps	(Gls)
2005–2010	Saint-Étienne	117	(1)
2010–2011	Sevilla	24	(0)
2011–2015	Lyon	67	(0)
2011–2014	Lyon B	4	(0)
2015–2016	Troyes	11	(0)
2016–2019	Caen	2	(0)
2016–2019	Caen B	23	(0)
Total		239	(1)

International career^{‡}
2007–2008	France U21	17	(0)
- * Club domestic league appearances and goals as of 09:22, 6 August 2019 (UTC) ‡ National team caps and goals as of 16 May 2008 (UTC)

Mouhamadou Dabo (born 28 November 1986) is a professional footballer who plays as a right-back, but has played left-back. He most recently played for Caen in Ligue 1. Born in Senegal, he has represented France at youth level.

== Club career ==
=== Saint-Étienne ===
Born in Dakar, Dabo began his career with ASC Yeggo and he then joined French club Saint-Étienne's youth academy when he was 14 years old. In the summer of 2004 he was promoted to the club's senior team by manager Élie Baup. On 7 May 2005, Dabo made his debut for Saint-Étienne in a 2–0 win over Toulouse and made three appearances in total in his first season. Baup's successor Ivan Hašek put Dabo in the right-back position before newly manager Laurent Roussey switched him into the left-back role.

Dabo's second season proved to be the breakout year for the player as he received more playing time. On 21 September 2008, Dabo scored his first goal for Saint-Étienne against Paris Saint-Germain. The result was 1–0 in favor of Saint-Étienne. On 7 February 2009, Dabo scored an own goal against Caen. However, Saint-Étienne won the match 3–2 with goals from Bafétimbi Gomis and Ilan, who scored twice. In January 2009, club manager Alain Perrin told Le Progrès that Dabo, who had one year left on his contract at the time, refused all proposals on an extension.

=== Sevilla ===
Following his contract expiration, Dabo signed a four-year contract with Spanish club Sevilla on a free transfer, making him the first signing for the club. He made his debut for Sevilla in the first leg of the team's Supercopa de España tie against Barcelona on 14 August 2010. Two weeks later, Dabo made his league debut for Sevilla in a 4–1 win over Levante. On 19 December 2010, he received his first red card of his career after he kicked goal-scorer Ángel Di María in a 1–0 loss against Real Madrid.

=== Lyon ===
After just one season in Spain, in August 2011, Dabo returned to France signing a four-year contract with Lyon. The transfer fee was priced at €1 million plus a possible €800k in incentives. On 18 September 2011, Dabo made his debut for Lyon in a 2–0 win over Marseille after coming on a substitute for Anthony Réveillère. On 29 October 2011, he played his first match against his former club Saint-Étienne in a 2–0 win, but received a straight red card in the second half after foul on Bănel Nicoliță. In the Coupe de la Ligue, Dabo received his second red card of the season 2–1 win over Lille on 11 January 2012.

=== Troyes ===
Following his release by Lyon, Dabo completed a move to newly promoted Ligue 1 club Troyes on 14 October 2015. He made his Troyes debut on 25 October in an away match against Bordeaux in Ligue 1.

== International career ==
Dabo earned 17 caps for the France national under-21 football team. He got his first call-up for France against Argentina on 11 February 2009.

== Career statistics ==
As of match played 6 August 2019.

Appearances and goals by club, season and competition
Club	Season	League			National Cup (Note: Includes the Coupe de France and Copa del Rey)		League Cup (Note: Includes the Coupe de la Ligue)		Europe (Note: Includes the UEFA Champions League and UEFA Europa League)		Other (Note: Includes the Supercopa de España and Trophée des Champions)		Total	
Club	Season	Division	Apps	Goals	Apps	Goals	Apps	Goals	Apps	Goals	Apps	Goals	Apps	Goals
Saint-Étienne	2004–05	Ligue 1	3	0	0	0	0	0	—		—		3	0
Saint-Étienne	2005–06	Ligue 1	19	0	0	0	0	0	—		—		19	0
Saint-Étienne	2006–07	Ligue 1	14	0	0	0	0	0	—		—		14	0
Saint-Étienne	2007–08	Ligue 1	32	0	0	0	0	0	—		—		32	0
Saint-Étienne	2008–09	Ligue 1	24	1	0	0	0	0	5 (Note: Five appearances in UEFA Europa League)	0	—		29	1
Saint-Étienne	2009–10	Ligue 1	25	0	1	0	0	0	—		—		26	0
Saint-Étienne	Total		117	1	1	0	0	0	5	0	—		123	1
Sevilla	2010–11	La Liga	24	0	3	0	—		8 (Note: Two appearances in UEFA Champions League, six in UEFA Europa League)	0	2 (Note: Two appearances in Supercopa de España)	0	37	0
Sevilla	2011–12	La Liga	0	0	0	0	—		—		—		0	0
Sevilla	Total		24	0	3	0	—		10	0	2	0	39	0
Lyon	2011–12	Ligue 1	15	0	5	0	3	0	3 (Note: Five appearances in UEFA Champions League)	0	—		26	0
Lyon	2012–13	Ligue 1	30	0	1	0	1	0	1 (Note: One appearance in UEFA Europa League)	0	1 (Note: One appearance in Trophée des Champions)	0	34	0
Lyon	2013–14	Ligue 1	10	0	0	0	1	0	5 (Note: One appearance in UEFA Champions League, four in UEFA Europa League)	0	—		16	0
Lyon	2014–15	Ligue 1	13	0	2	1	0	0	—		—		15	1
Lyon	Total		68	0	8	1	5	0	9	0	1	0	91	1
Lyon B	2011–12	CFA	1	0	0	0	—		—		—		1	0
Lyon B	2013–14	CFA	2	0	0	0	—		—		—		2	0
Lyon B	2014–15	CFA	1	0	0	0	—		—		—		1	0
Lyon B	Total		4	0	0	0	—		—		—		4	0
Troyes	2015–16	Ligue 1	1	0	0	0	0	0	—		—		1	0
Troyes	Total		1	0	0	0	0	0	—		—		1	0
Caen	2016–17	Ligue 1	2	0	1	0	0	0	—		—		3	0
Caen	2017–18	Ligue 1	0	0	0	0	0	0	—		—		0	0
Caen	2018–19	Ligue 1	0	0	0	0	0	0	—		—		0	0
Caen	Total		2	0	1	0	0	0	—		—		3	0
Caen B	2016–17	CFA 2 / National 3	7	0	0	0	0	0	—		—		7	0
Caen B	2017–18	CFA 2 / National 3	14	0	0	0	0	0	—		—		14	0
Caen B	2018–19	CFA 2 / National 3	2	0	0	0	0	0	—		—		2	0
Caen B	Total		23	0	0	0	0	0	—		—		23	0
Career total			239	1	13	1	5	0	24	0	3	0	284	2

== Honours ==
Dabo has won two trophies in his career, firstly the 2011–12 Coupe de France and most recently the 2012 Trophée des Champions.

Lyon

- Coupe de France: 2011–12
- Trophée des Champions: 2012
