= Alejandro Alfaro =

Spanish professional footballer

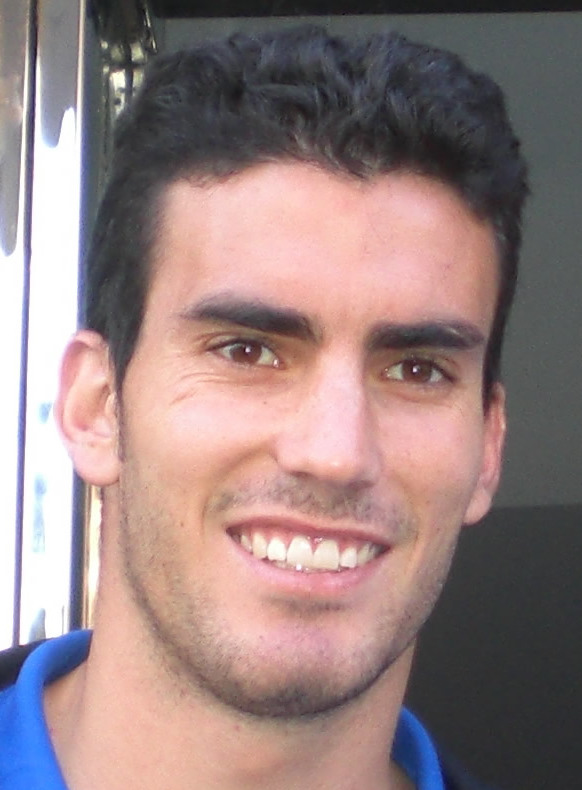
- Alfaro with Tenerife in 2010

Personal information
- Full name: Alejandro Alfaro Ligero
- Date of birth: 23 November 1986 (age 39)
- Place of birth: La Palma del Condado, Spain
- Height: 1.75 m (5 ft 9 in)
- Position: Winger

Youth career
- Siempre Alegres
- Sevilla

Senior career*
Years	Team	Apps	(Gls)
2005–2008	Sevilla B	100	(25)
2006–2011	Sevilla	33	(3)
2008–2010	→ Tenerife (loan)	78	(27)
2011–2014	Mallorca	94	(17)
2014–2016	Valladolid	18	(0)
2016–2019	Córdoba	79	(13)
2019	Hércules	13	(0)
2020	Intercity	8	(3)
Total		423	(88)

International career
2007	Spain U21	4	(0)
- * Club domestic league appearances and goals

Alejandro Alfaro Ligero (born 23 November 1986) is a Spanish former professional footballer. Mainly a right winger, he could also play as a second striker.

Over seven seasons, he appeared in 125 matches in La Liga, totalling 18 goals for Sevilla, Tenerife and Mallorca. In a 15-year senior career, he added 212 games and 49 goals in the Segunda División.

== Club career ==
=== Sevilla ===
Alfaro was born in La Palma del Condado, Province of Huelva. A product of Sevilla's youth system, he was one of Sevilla Atlético's most important players from 2005 onwards, helping them achieve promotion to Segunda División in the 2006–07 season. He had previously made his first-team debut on 30 April 2006, playing eight minutes in a 2–1 away win against Real Sociedad.

Alfaro scored his first La Liga goal on 28 January 2007, staring the 4–2 away victory over Levante, also appearing in four UEFA Cup games in the club's victorious campaign. However, he was nothing more than a fringe player with the main squad in his first three seasons, barred mainly by Jesús Navas (he did net seven times in 34 matches to help the reserves retain their second-division status), and would leave the Andalusians for 2008–09, joining Tenerife on loan. During this stint, he was instrumental as the Canary Islands side returned to the top flight after a seven-year-absence by scoring a career-best 20 goals, fourth-best in the competition.

After completing the 2009 preseason with Sevilla, Alfaro was again loaned for a season to Tenerife. Like Nino, he again was the most important attacking member of the team, who were eventually relegated again while the player contributed seven goals.

Returned to the Ramón Sánchez-Pizjuán Stadium for 2010–11, Alfaro benefitted from Navas' absence due to injury and featured in some games early into the season, scoring in a 2–1 defeat of Málaga on 19 September 2010. On 4 November, he scored twice against Karpaty Lviv (4–0 home win) in the Europa League group stage. The following week, he also found the net in two home fixtures, against Valencia (2–0, appearing as a second-half substitute) and Real Unión (6–1, in the round of 32 of the Copa del Rey).

=== Mallorca ===
On 8 August 2011, Mallorca reached an agreement with Sevilla to buy Alfaro for five years and €700,000. He started in his first official match, a 1–0 win over Espanyol.

Alfaro scored nine goals from 38 appearances in the 2013–14 season, with the team back in the second division.

=== Later career ===
Alfaro terminated his contract on 18 August 2014, and joined Super League Greece side Panathinaikos. The deal collapsed two days later, however, and he signed a two-year deal with Real Valladolid late in the month.

On 1 July 2016, having been sparingly used during his two-year tenure due to an ankle injury, Alfaro moved to Córdoba also of the second tier. On 23 July 2019, after suffering relegation, he agreed to a two-year contract at Segunda División B club Hércules.

Alfaro retired at the age of 33. In September 2020, he signed with Osasuna as a scout on the recommendation of Braulio Vázquez and "Cata" Prieto, who worked as sporting directors and knew Alfaro from their time at Valladolid.

== Personal life ==
Alfaro's two brothers were also footballers: Juan José (1981), a midfielder, graduated from FC Barcelona's La Masia, but spent his entire career in the Segunda División B or lower. Jesús, a forward, played several seasons with Sevilla B after emerging through the club's youth ranks.

== Honours ==
Sevilla

- Copa del Rey: 2006–07
- UEFA Cup: 2006–07
