= Fernando Navarro (Spanish footballer) =

Spanish footballer

Personal information
- Full name: Fernando Navarro Corbacho
- Date of birth: 25 June 1982 (age 44)
- Place of birth: Barcelona, Spain
- Height: 1.76 m (5 ft 9 in)
- Position: Left-back

Youth career
- 1993–2000: Barcelona

Senior career*
| Years | Team | Apps | (Gls) |
| 1999 | Barcelona C | 1 | (0) |
| 2000–2004 | Barcelona B | 65 | (0) |
| 2001–2006 | Barcelona | 21 | (1) |
| 2004 | → Albacete (loan) | 7 | (0) |
| 2005–2006 | → Mallorca (loan) | 33 | (1) |
| 2006–2008 | Mallorca | 73 | (1) |
| 2008–2015 | Sevilla | 203 | (0) |
| 2015–2018 | Deportivo La Coruña | 75 | (0) |
| Total | | 478 | (3) |

International career
| 1999 | Spain U17 | 1 | (0) |
| 2000–2001 | Spain U18 | 8 | (0) |
| 2002 | Spain U21 | 3 | (0) |
| 2008 | Spain | 2 | (0) |
| 2006–2009 | Catalonia | 3 | (0) |
Medal record
Representing Spain
UEFA European Championship
| Winner | 2008 Austria-Switzerland |
- * Club domestic league appearances and goals

Fernando Navarro Corbacho (Spanish pronunciation: [feɾˈnando naˈβaro]; born 25 June 1982) is a Spanish former professional footballer. Mainly a left-back, he could also play as a central defender.

He spent most of his career with Barcelona and Sevilla, winning three major titles with the latter club and appearing in 412 La Liga matches in 17 seasons, also representing in the competition Albacete, Mallorca and Deportivo.

Navarro was part of Spain's squad at Euro 2008, winning the tournament.

== Club career ==
=== Barcelona and Mallorca ===
Born in Barcelona, Catalonia, Navarro came through the ranks of giants FC Barcelona. He was on the verge of replacing longtime left-back Sergi Barjuán who had left for Atlético Madrid in 2002, but a serious knee injury finished off his chances with his hometown club. On 3 November 2002, he scored his only goal for Barça and his first as a professional, in a 1–1 away draw against Racing de Santander.

After an uneventful six-month loan at Albacete Balompié in 2004, also in La Liga, Navarro was loaned again, this time to RCD Mallorca (still in the top flight) for the 2005–06 season. After a successful campaign the Balearic Islands side decided to buy him outright, and he was an undisputed starter during his tenure.

=== Sevilla ===
Navarro joined Sevilla FC on 18 June 2008, for a reported €5 million. He was first-choice in his first two seasons as the Andalusians ranked respectively third and fourth, totalling 27 yellow cards in the process.

In the following campaigns, with no real competitor in his position, Navarro continued to start for Sevilla. On 26 October 2011, he renewed his contract, due to expire in June 2013, for a further three years. The previous month, he was involved in an incident in a home fixture against Valencia CF: after opponent Aritz Aduriz stepped on Emir Spahić in the 70th minute, the latter's reaction was apparently exaggerated, but Navarro vehemently asked for a red card to Aduriz, which was conceded by the referee.

From the year 2013 onwards, after the emergence of youth graduate Alberto Moreno, Navarro appeared in several games as a central defender. He won the UEFA Europa League in 2013–14 and in 2014–15, leaving the Ramón Sánchez Pizjuán Stadium with 282 competitive appearances to his credit.

=== Deportivo ===
On 19 June 2015, aged 32, Navarro signed a two-year deal with fellow top-tier team Deportivo de La Coruña, with an option for a third. Three years later, shortly after having been relegated, he announced his retirement.

== International career ==
Spain national team coach Luis Aragonés called Navarro for an exhibition game with France on 6 February 2008. He did not enter the pitch, however, going on to make his debut against the United States on 4 June in a 1–0 friendly win.

Selected for UEFA Euro 2008, Navarro appeared in the 2–1 group-stage victory over Greece, as Spain emerged victorious in the tournament. Previously, he participated in the 1999 FIFA World Championship in New Zealand with the under-17s.

== Career statistics ==
Appearances and goals by club, season and competition
| Club | Season | League | | | Copa del Rey | | Continental | | Other | | Total | |
| Club | Season | Division | Apps | Goals | Apps | Goals | Apps | Goals | Apps | Goals | Apps | Goals |
|---|---|---|---|---|---|---|---|---|---|---|---|---|
| Barcelona B | 2000–01 | Segunda División B | 25 | 0 | — | | — | | — | | 25 | 0 |
| Barcelona B | 2001–02 | Segunda División B | 32 | 0 | — | | — | | 6 (Note: Appearances in Segunda División B play-offs) | 0 | 38 | 0 |
| Barcelona B | 2003–04 | Segunda División B | 8 | 0 | — | | — | | — | | 8 | 0 |
| Barcelona B | Total | | 65 | 0 | — | | — | | 6 | 0 | 71 | 0 |
| Barcelona | 2000–01 | La Liga | 0 | 0 | 0 | 0 | 0 | 0 | — | | 0 | 0 |
| Barcelona | 2001–02 | La Liga | 3 | 0 | 1 | 0 | 0 | 0 | — | | 4 | 0 |
| Barcelona | 2002–03 | La Liga | 13 | 1 | 1 | 0 | 9 (Note: Appearances in UEFA Champions League) | 0 | — | | 23 | 1 |
| Barcelona | 2003–04 | La Liga | 0 | 0 | 0 | 0 | 0 | 0 | — | | 0 | 0 |
| Barcelona | 2004–05 | La Liga | 5 | 0 | 1 | 0 | 2 | 0 | — | | 8 | 0 |
| Barcelona | Total | | 21 | 1 | 3 | 0 | 11 | 0 | — | | 35 | 1 |
| Albacete (loan) | 2003–04 | La Liga | 7 | 0 | 0 | 0 | — | | — | | 7 | 0 |
| Mallorca (loan) | 2005–06 | La Liga | 33 | 1 | 1 | 0 | — | | — | | 34 | 1 |
| Mallorca | 2006–07 | La Liga | 37 | 1 | 2 | 0 | — | | — | | 39 | 1 |
| Mallorca | 2007–08 | La Liga | 36 | 0 | 6 | 0 | — | | — | | 42 | 0 |
| Mallorca | Total | | 106 | 2 | 9 | 0 | — | | — | | 115 | 2 |
| Sevilla | 2008–09 | La Liga | 31 | 0 | 8 | 0 | 5 (Note: Appearances in UEFA Europa League/UEFA Cup) | 0 | — | | 44 | 0 |
| Sevilla | 2009–10 | La Liga | 29 | 0 | 6 | 0 | 8 | 0 | — | | 43 | 0 |
| Sevilla | 2010–11 | La Liga | 30 | 0 | 6 | 0 | 7 (Note: Appearances in UEFA Champions League and UEFA Europa League) | 0 | 1 (Note: Appearance in Supercopa de España) | 0 | 44 | 0 |
| Sevilla | 2011–12 | La Liga | 35 | 0 | 2 | 0 | 2 | 0 | — | | 39 | 0 |
| Sevilla | 2012–13 | La Liga | 35 | 0 | 6 | 0 | — | | — | | 41 | 0 |
| Sevilla | 2013–14 | La Liga | 24 | 0 | 2 | 0 | 13 | 0 | — | | 39 | 0 |
| Sevilla | 2014–15 | La Liga | 19 | 0 | 6 | 0 | 6 | 0 | 1 (Note: Appearance in UEFA Super Cup) | 0 | 32 | 0 |
| Sevilla | Total | | 203 | 0 | 36 | 0 | 41 | 0 | 2 | 0 | 282 | 0 |
| Deportivo | 2015–16 | La Liga | 35 | 0 | 0 | 0 | — | | — | | 35 | 0 |
| Deportivo | 2016–17 | La Liga | 25 | 0 | 1 | 0 | — | | — | | 26 | 0 |
| Deportivo | 2017–18 | La Liga | 15 | 0 | 1 | 0 | — | | — | | 16 | 0 |
| Deportivo | Total | | 75 | 0 | 2 | 0 | — | | — | | 77 | 0 |
| Career total | | | 477 | 3 | 50 | 0 | 52 | 0 | 8 | 0 | 587 | 3 |

== Honours ==
Barcelona

- La Liga: 2004–05

Sevilla

- Copa del Rey: 2009–10
- UEFA Europa League: 2013–14, 2014–15

Spain

- UEFA European Championship: 2008

== See also ==
- List of footballers with 400 or more La Liga appearances
