= 2009–10 Xerez CD season =

Xerez
2009–10 season
- Chairman: Carlos de Osma (until 3 December); Joaquín Morales (between 3 December and 18 January); Federico Souza
- Manager: Cuco Ziganda (until 12 January); Antonio Poyatos (between 12 January and 18 January); Néstor Gorosito
- La Liga: 20th (relegated)
- Copa del Rey: Round of 32
- Top goalscorer: League: Mario Bermejo (10); All: Mario Bermejo (10)
Home colours	Away colours	Third colours

The 2009–10 Spanish football season is Xerez's first season ever in Liga BBVA.

== Trophies balance ==
Category	Trophy	Started round	First match	Result	Last match
Friendly Trophy	Puerto Real Trophy	Final	August 5, 2009	Winner	August 5, 2009
Friendly Trophy	Trofeo de la Vendimia	Final	August 18, 2009	Winner	August 18, 2009
Friendly Trophy	2nd Antonio Puerta Trophy	Final	August 21, 2009	Runner-up	August 21, 2009
Competitive	Liga BBVA	—	August 30, 2009	20th	May 16, 2010
Competitive	Copa del Rey	Round of 32	October 28, 2009	Round of 32	November 10, 2009

== Summer transfers ==
=== In ===
Player	From	Fee
(Iran) Mehrdad Oladi^{1}	(United Arab Emirates) Al-Shabab	Free

=== Out ===
Player	New Team	Fee
(Spain) Jorge Luque	(Spain) Córdoba	Free
(Spain) Pedro Ríos	(Spain) Getafe	Free
(France) Stéphane Porato	Unattached	–
(Iran) Mehrdad Oladi^{1}	(Iran) Malavan	Free

=== Loan in ===
Player	From
(Brazil) Renan	(Spain) Valencia
(Chile) Fabián Orellana	(Italy) Udinese
(Spain) David Prieto	(Spain) Sevilla
(Argentina) Emiliano Armenteros	(Spain) Sevilla
(Spain) José Manuel Casado	(Spain) Sevilla
(Mali) Sidi Keita	(France) Lens
(Spain) Víctor Sánchez	(Spain) Barcelona B
(Argentina) Leandro Gioda	(Argentina) Independiente
(Venezuela) Giancarlo Maldonado	(Mexico) Atlante
(Spain) Aythami	(Spain) Deportivo La Coruña
(Spain) Álex Bergantiños	(Spain) Deportivo La Coruña

=== Loan return ===
Player	From
(Cameroon) Lionnel Franck^{5}	(Spain) San Fernando

=== Loan end ===
Player	Returns to
(United States) Jozy Altidore	(Spain) Villarreal
(Spain) Asier Arranz	(Spain) Real Valladolid
(Spain) Martí Crespí	(Spain) Mallorca
(Argentina) Brian Sarmiento	(Spain) Racing Santander
(Spain) Álvaro Silva	(Spain) Málaga B
(Spain) Antonio Calle	(Spain) Gimnàstic de Tarragona
(Ghana) Mohammed Rabiu	(Ghana) Liberty Professionals

== Winter transfers ==
=== Loan in ===
Player	From
(Argentina) Matías Alustiza	(Argentina) Argentinos Juniors
(Uruguay) Nicolás Vigneri	(Mexico) Puebla

=== Loan end ===
Player	Team
(Venezuela) Giancarlo Maldonado	(Mexico) Atlante

== Current squad ==
Note: Flags indicate national team as defined under FIFA eligibility rules; some limited exceptions apply. Players may hold more than one non-FIFA nationality.

No.	Pos.	Nation	Player
1	GK	ESP	Chema
2	DF	ESP	Juan Redondo
3	DF	ESP	Jesús Mendoza (captain)
4	MF	ESP	Álex Bergantiños (on loan from Deportivo La Coruña)
5	DF	ARG	Leandro Gioda (on loan from Independiente)
6	MF	ESP	Vicente Moreno
7	DF	ESP	Francis
8	FW	ESP	Antoñito
9	FW	ESP	Mario Bermejo
10	MF	ESP	Emilio Viqueira
11	MF	ESP	Momo
12	FW	URU	Nicolás Vigneri (on loan from Puebla)

No.	Pos.	Nation	Player
13	GK	BRA	Renan (on loan from Valencia)
14	MF	ESP	Víctor Sánchez (on loan from Barcelona B)
15	FW	CHI	Fabián Orellana (on loan from Udinese)
16	MF	ARG	Emiliano Armenteros (on loan from Sevilla)
17	FW	ESP	Míchel
18	DF	ESP	David Prieto (on loan from Sevilla)
19	MF	ESP	Carlos Calvo
20	MF	ESP	Abel Gómez
21	FW	ARG	Matías Alustiza (on loan from Argentinos Juniors)
22	DF	ESP	José Manuel Casado (on loan from Sevilla)
23	DF	ESP	Aythami (on loan from Deportivo La Coruña)
24	MF	MLI	Sidi Keita (on loan from Lens)

== Match results ==
All times are in CET

=== Pre-season ===
==== Friendly matches ====
1 August 2009	Arcos de la Frontera (Spain)	2–3	Xerez	Arcos de la Frontera (Cádiz)
	Álvaro 30'; Archi 80'	(Report)	32' (pen.) Momo; 40' Míchel; 51' Bermejo	Stadium: A. B. Stadium

12 August 2009	Xerez	1–1	Córdoba	Puerto Real (Cádiz)^{2}
22:00	Gioda 26'; Redondo (yellow card); Joaqui (yellow card); Mendoza (red card)	(Report)	12' Díaz; (red card) Richi

23 August 2009	Xerez	4–0	Recreativo	Arcos de la Frontera (Cádiz)^{2}
22:00	Abel 1'; Oladi^{1} 42'; Armenteros 45+1', 53'	(Report)	(yellow card) Fuego	Stadium: A. B. Stadium; Attendance: 1,800; Referee: (Spain) José María Olivares Magaña

==== Puerto Real Trophy ====
5 August 2009 Final	Puerto Real CF (Spain)	0–1	Xerez	Puerto Real (Cádiz)
		(Report)	67' Gioda

==== Trofeo de la Vendimia ====
18 August 2009 Final	Xerez	2–0	(Belgium) Mouscron	Jerez de la Frontera (Cádiz)
	Antoñito 60'; Rosillo 73', (yellow card); Gioda (yellow card)	(Report)	(yellow card) El Araichi; (yellow card) Assou-Ekotto; (yellow card) Teklak	Stadium: Chapín; Attendance: 9,243; Referee: (Spain) Antonio Pérez Riverol

==== 2nd Antonio Puerta Trophy ====
21 August 2009 Final	Sevilla	2–1	Xerez	Sevilla
21:30	José Carlos 39'; Perotti 50'; Dragutinović (yellow card)	(Report)	87' Míchel; (yellow card) Francis	Stadium: Estadio Ramón Sánchez Pizjuán; Attendance: 21,000; Referee: (Spain) Andrés Ceballos Silva

=== La Liga ===
Matchday	1	2	3	4	5	6	7	8	9	10	11	12	13	14	15^{4}	16	17	18	19	20	21	22	23	24	25	26	27	28	29	30	31	32	33	34	35	36	37	38
Result against	MLL	ATH	RMA	DEP	ESP	MGA	VIL	TEN	SEV	VAD	SPG	GET	ATM	RAC	FCB	ALM	VAL	ZAR	OSA	MLL	ATH	RMA	DEP	ESP	MGA	VIL	TEN	SEV	VAD	SPG	GET	ATM	RAC	FCB	ALM	VAL	ZAR	OSA
Venue	A	H	A	H	A	H	H	A	H	A	H	A	H	A	H	A	H	A	H	H	A	H	A	H	A	A	H	A	H	A	H	A	H	A	H	A	H	A
Position	17	19	20	20	20	20	18	19	19	19	19	20	20	20	20	20	20	20	20	20	20	20	20	20	20	20	20	20	20	20	20	20	20	20	20	20	20	20
Goal Average (useful in case of tie)^{3}																				Lost	Lost	Lost	Lost	Lost	Won	Lost	Lost	Lost	Won	Won	Lost	Lost	Lost	Lost	Lost	Lost	Won	Lost

		All							Home					Away				
		Pts	W	D	L	F	A	Dif.	W	D	L	F	A	W	D	L	F	A
20	Xerez (R)	34	8	10	20	38	66	−28	6	4	9	20	29	2	6	11	18	37

Liga del Juego Limpio (Sponsored by Radio Marca, Marca, Veo 7 and Mahou)
Position	Team	Supporters' Behavior Overall Between 0 and 5 stars
1	Xerez	(3.66)

Biggest win
Home				Away			
March 28, 2010	Matchday 28	v. Real Valladolid	3 – 0	March 7, 2010	Matchday 25	v. Málaga	2 – 4
Biggest loss
Home				Away			
September 23, 2009	Matchday 4	v. Deportivo La Coruña	0 – 3	September 20, 2009	Matchday 3	v. Real Madrid	5 – 0
February 13, 2010	Matchday 22	v. Real Madrid	0 – 3	September 20, 2009	Matchday 3	v. Real Madrid	5 – 0

- With Cuco Ziganda

30 August 2009 1	Mallorca	2–0	Xerez	Palma de Mallorca
17:00	Ayoze (yellow card) 18'; Martí (yellow card) 37'; Aduriz 56'; Tuni 60', (yellow card) 68'	(Report)	(yellow card) 15' (yellow-red card) 39' Gioda; (yellow card) 35' (yellow-red card) 89' Calvo; (yellow card) 80' Sánchez	Stadium: ONO Estadi; Referee: Xavier Estrada Fernández

13 September 2009 2	Xerez	0–1	Athletic Bilbao	Jerez de la Frontera (Cádiz)
21:00	Abel (yellow card) 13'; Sánchez (yellow card) 25'; Mendoza (red card) 84'; Maldonado (yellow card) 88'; Prieto (yellow card) 89'	(Report)	32' (o.g.) Prieto; (yellow card) 59' Yeste; (yellow card) 63' Toquero; (yellow card) 83' Ocio	Stadium: Chapín; Referee: Miguel Ángel Ayza Gámez

20 September 2009 3	Real Madrid	5–0	Xerez	Madrid
19:00	Ronaldo 1', 74'; Guti 78'; Benzema 81'; Van Nistelrooy 88'	(Report)	(yellow card) 78' Francis	Stadium: Santiago Bernabéu; Referee: Carlos Delgado Ferreiro

23 September 2009 4	Xerez	0–3	Deportivo La Coruña	Jerez de la Frontera (Cádiz)
20:00	Moreno (yellow card) 41'	(Report)	26', (yellow card) 27' Juca; 71' (o.g.) Gioda; 78' Riki	Stadium: Chapín; Referee: Alfonso Pérez Burrull

27 September 2009 5	Espanyol	0–0	Xerez	Cornellà de Llobregat (Barcelona)
17:00	Roncaglia (yellow card) 39'	(Report)	(yellow card) 76' Renan	Stadium: Nou Estadi Cornellà-El Prat; Referee: José Luis González González

4 October 2009 6	Xerez	1–1	Málaga	Jerez de la Frontera (Cádiz)
17:00	Keita (yellow card) 31'; Bermejo (yellow card) 41'; Armenteros 45+1', (yellow card) 85'	(Report)	(yellow card) 63' Cuadrado; (yellow card) 83' (yellow-red card) 88', (goal) 84' Obinna; (yellow card) 83' Edinho	Stadium: Chapín; Referee: Alfonso J. Álvarez Izquierdo

18 October 2009 7	Xerez	2–1	Villarreal	Jerez de la Frontera (Cádiz)
17:00	Bermejo 42'; Francis (yellow card) 70'; Antoñito 79'; Renan (yellow card) 89'	(Report)	18' Pires; (yellow card) 74' Godín; (yellow card) 80' (yellow-red card) 87' Rodríguez; (yellow card) 80' D. López; (yellow card) 80' Senna	Stadium: Chapín; Referee: Antonio Rubinos Pérez

25 October 2009 8	Tenerife	1–0	Xerez	Tenerife
17:00	Román (yellow card) 24'; Alfaro 73'	(Report)	(yellow card) 75' Armenteros	Stadium: Heliodoro Rodríguez López; Referee: Carlos Clos Gómez

31 October 2009 9	Xerez	0–2	Sevilla	Jerez de la Frontera (Cádiz)
20:00	Gioda (yellow card) 14'; Calvo (yellow card) 26'; Casado (yellow card) 44'; Keita (yellow card) 50'	(Report)	(yellow card) 22' Navarro; (yellow card) 25' Dragutinović; 42' Negredo; (yellow card) 70' Duscher; 89' Luís Fabiano	Stadium: Chapín; Referee: Bernardino González Vázquez

8 November 2009 10	Real Valladolid	0–0	Xerez	Valladolid
17:00		(Report)	(yellow card) 53' (yellow-red card) 90+2' Prieto; (yellow card) 76' Aythami; (yellow card) 86' Renan; (yellow card) 88' Keita	Stadium: Nuevo José Zorrilla; Attendance: 16,231; Referee: Carlos Velasco Carballo

22 November 2009 11	Xerez	0–0	Sporting de Gijón	Jerez de la Frontera (Cádiz)
17:00	Prieto (yellow card) 18'; Aythami (yellow card) 34'	(Report)	(yellow card) 15' Matabuena; (yellow card) 77' Grégory	Stadium: Chapín; Referee: Antonio Miguel Mateu Lahoz

29 November 2009 12	Getafe	5–1	Xerez	Getafe (Madrid)
17:00	Soldado 43', 44', 57'; Parejo 56'; Casquero 59'	(Report)	(yellow card) 4' Francis; 32' Aythami; (red card) 44' Prieto; (yellow card) 54' Bergantiños; (yellow card) 79' Casado	Stadium: El Coliséum; Referee: César Muñiz Fernández

2 December 2009^{4} 13	Xerez	0–2	Barcelona	Jerez de la Frontera (Cádiz)
22:00	Aythami (yellow card) 79'	(Report)	46' Henry; 89' Ibrahimović	Stadium: Chapín; Referee: Carlos Velasco Carballo

5 December 2009 14	Xerez	0–2	Atlético Madrid	Jerez de la Frontera (Cádiz)
18:00	Casado (yellow card) 57'; Keita (yellow card) 64' (yellow-red card) 70'	(Report)	28', (yellow card) 87' Forlán; 65' Agüero; (yellow card) 75' (yellow-red card) 84' Domínguez	Stadium: Chapín; Referee: Miguel Ángel Pérez Lasa

13 December 2009 15	Racing Santander	3–2	Xerez	Santander
17:00	Lacen 26'; Morris (yellow card) 27'; Xisco (yellow card) 42', (goal) 82'; Arana 49'; Henrique (yellow card) 84'	(Report)	3' Bermejo; (yellow card) 30' Moreno; 69' Antoñito; (yellow card) 78' Abel; (yellow card) 88' Aythami	Stadium: El Sardinero; Referee: Alberto Undiano Mallenco

3 January 2010 16	Almería	1–0	Xerez	Almería
17:00	Crusat (yellow card) 21'; Flores (yellow card) 34'; M'Bami (yellow card) 44'; Ortiz 88'	(Report)	(yellow card) 27' Abel; (yellow card) 58' Casado; (yellow card) 68' Bermejo; (yellow card) 80' Momo; (yellow card) 89' Gioda	Stadium: Juegos del Mediterráneo; Referee: Javier Turienzo Álvarez

10 January 2010 17	Xerez	1–3	Valencia	Jerez de la Frontera (Cádiz)
17:00	Calvo 25'; Francis (yellow card) 37'; Casado (yellow card) 39'; Aythami (yellow card) 52'	(Report)	11' Mata; (yellow card) 31', (goal) 33' Silva; (yellow card) 44' Bruno; (yellow card) 49', (goal) 69' Marchena	Stadium: Chapín; Referee: Carlos Clos Gómez

- With Antonio Poyatos

17 January 2010 18	Real Zaragoza	0–0	Xerez	Zaragoza
17:00	Herrera (yellow card) 82'	(Report)	(yellow card) 27' Bergantiños; (yellow card) 41' Redondo; (red card) 55' Sánchez; (yellow card) 78' Armenteros	Stadium: La Romareda; Referee: Antonio Miguel Mateu Lahoz

- With Néstor Gorosito

24 January 2010 19	Xerez	1–2	Osasuna	Jerez de la Frontera (Cádiz)
17:00	Bermejo 22'; Viqueira (yellow card) 84'	(Report)	9' Monreal; (yellow card) 65' Puñal; 82' Camuñas	Stadium: Chapín; Referee: José Luis González González

31 January 2010 20	Xerez	2–1	Mallorca	Jerez de la Frontera (Cádiz)
17:00	Aythami (yellow card) 37'; Redondo (yellow card) 42'; Calvo 52', 79'	(Report)	23' Webó; (yellow card) 62' Bruno China; (yellow card) 66' Corrales	Stadium: Chapín; Referee: Alberto Undiano Mallenco

7 February 2010 21	Athletic Bilbao	3–2	Xerez	Bilbao
17:00	Muniain 2', (yellow card) 44'; San José (yellow card) 60'; Llorente 64', 85'	(Report)	10', (yellow card) 17' Moreno; (yellow card) 24' Redondo; (yellow card) 27' Calvo; 40', (yellow card) 69' Bermejo; (yellow card) 43' Sánchez	Stadium: San Mamés; Referee: Alfonso J. Álvarez Izquierdo

13 February 2010 22	Xerez	0–3	Real Madrid	Jerez de la Frontera (Cádiz)
20:00	Keita (yellow card) 49'; Casado (yellow card) 60'	(Report)	(yellow card) 8' Ramos; (yellow card) 39', (goal) 64' Arbeloa; (yellow card) 52' L. Diarra; 69', 71' Ronaldo	Stadium: Chapín; Referee: Javier Turienzo Álvarez

20 February 2010 23	Deportivo La Coruña	2–1	Xerez	A Coruña
18:00	Guardado 2' (pen.); Riki 6', (yellow card) 8'; Laure (yellow card) 57'; Lopo (yellow card) 84'	(Report)	(yellow card) 2' Moreno; 38', (yellow card) 86' Bermejo; (yellow card) 42' Francis; (yellow card) 55' Keita; (yellow card) 73' Antoñito	Stadium: Riazor; Referee: Miguel Ángel Pérez Lasa

28 February 2010 24	Xerez	1–1	Espanyol	Jerez de la Frontera (Cádiz)
17:00	Bermejo (yellow card) 44', (goal) 75'; Alustiza (yellow card) 74'	(Report)	17' Osvaldo; (yellow card) 71' Forlín	Stadium: Chapín; Referee: Manuel Enrique Mejuto González

7 March 2010 25	Málaga	2–4	Xerez	Málaga
17:00	Iván (yellow card) 4'; Gámez (yellow card) 4'; Duda 40', (red card) 70'; Valdo 55'	(Report)	5' (pen.), 71' Momo; (yellow card) 21' Calvo; (yellow card) 32' Chema; (yellow card) 35' Mendoza; (yellow card) 38' Aythami; (yellow card) 52' Antoñito; (red card) 59' Armenteros; 76' Gioda; (yellow card) 89' Míchel; 90+2', (yellow card) 90+3' Orellana	Stadium: La Rosaleda; Referee: Carlos Velasco Carballo

14 March 2010 26	Villarreal	2–0	Xerez	Villarreal (Castellón)
17:00	Llorente 32'; Escudero 90'	(Report)	(yellow card) 29' Keita; (yellow card) 39' Aythami; (yellow card) 90+2' Momo; (yellow card) 90+3' Bermejo	Stadium: El Madrigal; Referee: Antonio Rubinos Pérez

20 March 2010 27	Xerez	2–1	Tenerife	Jerez de la Frontera (Cádiz)
18:00	Bermejo 6'; Aythami 15'; Casado (yellow card) 32'; Redondo (yellow card) 33' (yellow-red card) 90'	(Report)	(yellow card) 29' Bertrán; 48' Nino; (yellow card) 50' Culebras; (yellow card) 67' Juanlu; (yellow card) 74' Manolo	Stadium: Chapín; Referee: Xavier Estrada Fernández

23 March 2010 28	Sevilla	1–1	Xerez	Sevilla
22:00	Kanouté 63' (pen.)	(Report)	(yellow card) 43', (goal) 90+1' Gioda; (yellow card) 69' Casado	Stadium: Estadio Ramón Sánchez Pizjuán; Referee: Miguel Ángel Ayza Gámez

28 March 2010 29	Xerez	3–0	Real Valladolid	Jerez de la Frontera (Cádiz)
17:00	Sánchez 1'; Míchel 36'; Bermejo (yellow card) 38', (goal) 72' (pen.); Redondo (yellow card) 43'	(Report)	(yellow card) 29' Pelé; (yellow card) 32' Sereno; (yellow card) 60' Arzo; (yellow card) 61' Nauzet; (red card) 71' Villar	Stadium: Chapín; Referee: Alfonso Pérez Burrull

4 April 2010 30	Sporting de Gijón	2–2	Xerez	Gijón
17:00	Rivera 13'; De las Cuevas 56'; Camacho (yellow card) 74'	(Report)	51' Bermejo; 79' Alustiza	Stadium: El Molinón; Referee: José Luis González González

10 April 2010 31	Xerez	0–1	Getafe	Jerez de la Frontera (Cádiz)
20:00	Redondo (yellow card) 29'; Sánchez (yellow card) 55'; Casado (yellow card) 57'	(Report)	(yellow card) 48' Celestini; 60' Rafa; (yellow card) 64' Adrián; (red card) 86' Pedro León	Stadium: Chapín; Referee: Eduardo Iturralde González

14 April 2010 32	Atlético Madrid	1–2	Xerez	Madrid
20:00	Simão (yellow card) 5'; Forlán 11'; Tiago (yellow card) 57'; Reyes (yellow card) 90+1'	(Report)	8' Bermejo; (yellow card) 12' Keita; (yellow card) 39' Francis; 71' Armenteros; (yellow card) 80' Moreno; (yellow card) 85' Gioda	Stadium: Vicente Calderón; Referee: Fernando Teixeira Vitienes

18 April 2010 33	Xerez	2–2	Racing Santander	Jerez de la Frontera (Cádiz)
17:00	Orellana 6'; Sánchez 72'; Redondo (yellow card) 87'	(Report)	43', 56' (pen.) Tchité; (yellow card) 60' Colsa; (yellow card) 71' Crespo	Stadium: Chapín; Referee: Alfonso J. Álvarez Izquierdo

24 April 2010 34	Barcelona	3–1	Xerez	Barcelona
18:00	Jeffrén 13'; Henry 23'; Ibrahimović 55'; Bojan (yellow card) 78'	(Report)	(yellow card) 15' Aythami; 24', (yellow card) 82' Bermejo; (yellow card) 27' Sánchez; (yellow card) 64' Casado; (yellow card) 71' (red card) 90+1' Orellana; (yellow card) 81' Renan; (yellow card) 86' Moreno; (yellow card) 87' Gioda; (red card) 89' Alustiza; (yellow card) 90+1' Calvo	Stadium: Camp Nou; Referee: César Muñiz Fernández

1 May 2010 35	Xerez	2–1	Almería	Jerez de la Frontera (Cádiz)
18:00	Armenteros 26'; Sánchez (yellow card) 32'; Calvo (yellow card) 36'; Keita (yellow card) 38' (yellow-red card) 40'; Bermejo 90+3'	(Report)	33' Soriano; (yellow card) 53' Acasiete; (yellow card) 54' Bernardello; (yellow card) 55' (yellow-red card) 81' Guilherme; (yellow card) 65', (red card) 90+4' Ortiz; (yellow card) 85' Goitom	Stadium: Chapín; Referee: Miguel Ángel Ayza Gámez

4 May 2010 36	Valencia	3–1	Xerez	Valencia
22:00	Mata 44', 57'; Silva 67', (yellow card) 81'; Banega (yellow card) 72'; Albelda (yellow card) 76'	(Report)	36' Armenteros; (yellow card) 81' (yellow-red card) 90+1' Redondo	Stadium: Mestalla; Referee: Xavier Estrada Fernández

8 May 2010 37	Xerez	3–2	Real Zaragoza	Jerez de la Frontera (Cádiz)
21:00	Francis 21'; Orellana (yellow card) 29'; Bergantiños (yellow card) 63'; Míchel 68'; Calvo 73', (yellow card) 73'	(Report)	(yellow card) 9' Jarošík; (yellow card) 36' Aguilar; (yellow card) 46' (yellow-red card) 90+1' Contini; (yellow card) 47' Obradović; 66' Herrera; (yellow card) 71' Ponzio; 74' Gabi	Stadium: Chapín; Referee: Carlos Delgado Ferreiro

16 May 2010 38	Osasuna	1–1	Xerez	Pamplona
19:00	Dady 55'	(Report)	60' Antoñito; (red card) 90+3' Orellana	Stadium: Reyno de Navarra; Referee: Alfonso J. Álvarez Izquierdo

=== Copa del Rey ===
==== Round of 32 ====
28 October 2009 First leg	Xerez	1–2	Osasuna	Jerez de la Frontera (Cádiz)
20:00	Redondo (yellow card) 57'; Maldonado 67'	(Report)	17', (yellow card) 69' Sergio; 21' Dady; (yellow card) 25' Monreal	Stadium: Chapín; Referee: Antonio Miguel Mateu Lahoz

10 November 2009 Second leg	CA Osasuna	1–0	Xerez	Pamplona
20:00	Vadócz (yellow card) 51'; Dady 79'	(Report)	(yellow card) 22' Redondo; (yellow card) 49' Sánchez	Stadium: Reyno de Navarra; Referee: Alfonso J. Álvarez Izquierdo

Osasuna won 3–1 on aggregate.
