= 2009–10 Sevilla FC season =

103rd season in existence of Sevilla FC

Sevilla
2009–10 season
- President: José María del Nido
- Head coach: Manolo Jiménez (until 24 Mar); Antonio Álvarez (from 24 Mar)
- La Liga: 4th
- Copa del Rey: Winners
- UEFA Champions League: Round of 16
- Top goalscorer: League: Luís Fabiano (15); All: Luís Fabiano (21)
Home colours	Away colours	Third colours

The 2009–10 Sevilla FC season is the club's ninth consecutive season in La Liga. Manolo Jiménez was the team coach until 24 March 2010. On 19 May 2010, Sevilla won the Copa del Rey for the fifth time.

== Trophies balance ==
Category	Trophy	Started round	First match	Result	Last match
Friendly Trophy	2009 Peace Cup	Group Stage	24 July 2009	Group Stage	26 July 2009
Friendly Trophy	55th Ramón de Carranza Trophy	Semi-final	14 August 2009	Winner	15 August 2009
Friendly Trophy	2nd Antonio Puerta Trophy	Final	21 August 2009	Winner	21 August 2009
Competitive	Liga BBVA	—	30 August 2009	4th	15 May 2010
Competitive	Copa del Rey	Round of 32	27 October 2009	Winner	19 May 2010
Competitive	UEFA Champions League	Group Stage	16 September 2009	Round of 16	16 March 2010

=== Competitive balance ===
Biggest win
	Home				Away			
La Liga	12 September 2009	Matchday 2	v. Real Zaragoza	4–1	26 September 2009	Matchday 5	v. Athletic Bilbao	0–4
La Liga	3 April 2010	Matchday 30	v. Tenerife	3–0	5 May 2010	Matchday 36	v. Racing Santander	1–5
La Liga	17 April 2010	Matchday 33	v. Sporting Gijón	3–0	5 May 2010	Matchday 36	v. Racing Santander	1–5
Copa del Rey	10 November 2009	Round of 32, 2nd leg	v. Atlético Ciudad	5–1	20 January 2010	Quarter-finals, 1st leg	v. Deportivo	0–3
Champions League	16 September 2009	Group Stage, Matchday 1	v. Unirea Urziceni	2–0	29 September 2009	Group Stage, Matchday 2	v. Rangers	1–4
Biggest loss
	Home				Away			
Liga BBVA	19 December 2009	Matchday 15	v. Getafe	1–2	16 January 2010	Matchday 18	v. Barcelona	4–0
Liga BBVA	9 January 2010	Matchday 17	v. Racing Santander	1–2	16 January 2010	Matchday 18	v. Barcelona	4–0
Liga BBVA	8 May 2010	Matchday 37	v. Barcelona	2–3	16 January 2010	Matchday 18	v. Barcelona	4–0
Copa del Rey	13 January 2010	Round of 16, 2nd leg	v. Barcelona	0–1	10 February 2010	Semifinals, 2nd leg	v. Getafe	1–0
Copa del Rey	27 January 2010	Quarterfinals, 2nd leg	v. Deportivo	0–1	10 February 2010	Semifinals, 2nd leg	v. Getafe	1–0
Champions League	16 March 2010	Round of 16, 2nd leg	v. CSKA Moscow	1–2	24 November 2009	Group Stage, Matchday 5	v. Unirea Urziceni	1–0

== Summer transfers ==
=== In ===
Player	From	Fee
(Spain) Sergio Sánchez	(Spain) Espanyol	€3,000,000
(Spain) Álvaro Negredo	(Spain) Real Madrid (was on loan at (Spain) Almería)	€14,000,000
(Ivory Coast) Didier Zokora	(England) Tottenham Hotspur	€10,000,000

=== Out ===
Player	New Team	Fee
(Colombia) Aquivaldo Mosquera	(Mexico) América	€4,200,000
(Spain) Pablo Ruiz	(Spain) Cartagena (he was playing on loan in (Spain) Córdoba)	Free
(Portugal) Duda	(Spain) Málaga	€400,000
(Italy) Enzo Maresca	(Greece) Olympiacos	€1,200,000
(Italy) Morgan De Sanctis	(Italy) Napoli (he was playing on loan in (Turkey) Galatasaray)	€1,700,000

=== Loan return ===
Player	From
(Belgium) Tom De Mul	(Belgium) Genk
(Spain) Lolo	(Spain) Málaga

=== Loan out ===
Player	Team
(Spain) José Ángel Crespo	(Spain) Racing Santander
(Spain) Alejandro Alfaro	(Spain) Tenerife
(Argentina) Emiliano Armenteros	(Spain) Xerez
(Spain) José Manuel Casado	(Spain) Xerez
(Spain) David Prieto	(Spain) Xerez

== Winter transfers ==
=== Loan in ===
Player	From
(Lithuania) Marius Stankevičius	(Italy) Sampdoria

=== Loan out ===
Player	Team
(Uruguay) Javier Chevantón	(Italy) Atalanta
(Ivory Coast) Arouna Koné	(Germany) Hannover 96

== Youth system ==
Players called during season from Sevilla Atlético and Sevilla C.

No	Player	Position	Called For First Time
30	(Spain) José Carlos	MF	v Athletic Bilbao (26 September 2009)
34	(Spain) Marc Valiente	DF	v Atlético Ciudad (10 November 2009)
33	(Spain) Manuel Redondo	DF	v Tenerife (21 November 2009)
28	(Spain) Cala	DF	v Sporting Gijón (13 December 2009)
26	(Spain) Dani Jiménez	GK	v Atlético Madrid (2 January 2010)
27	(Spain) Enrique Carreño	FW	v Racing Santander (9 January 2010)
31	(Spain) Rodri	FW	v CSKA Moscow (24 February 2010)
42	(Spain) Luis Alberto	FW	v Xerez (23 March 2010)
37	(Spain) Antonio Luna	DF	v Almería (15 May 2010)

== Squad ==
Note: Flags indicate national team as defined under FIFA eligibility rules; some limited exceptions apply. Players may hold more than one non-FIFA nationality.

No.	Pos.	Nation	Player
1	GK	ESP	Andrés Palop (captain)
2	DF	ARG	Federico Fazio
3	DF	SRB	Ivica Dragutinović
4	DF	FRA	Sébastien Squillaci
5	MF	ARG	Aldo Duscher
6	MF	BRA	Adriano
7	MF	ESP	Jesús Navas
8	MF	CIV	Didier Zokora
10	FW	BRA	Luís Fabiano
11	MF	BRA	Renato
12	FW	MLI	Frédéric Kanouté
13	GK	ESP	Javi Varas
14	DF	FRA	Julien Escudé
15	DF	LTU	Marius Stankevičius (On loan from Sampdoria; No. 35 in UCL)
16	MF	ESP	Diego Capel
18	DF	ESP	Fernando Navarro

No.	Pos.	Nation	Player
19	FW	ESP	Álvaro Negredo
20	MF	BEL	Tom De Mul
21	MF	ARG	Lautaro Acosta
22	MF	CIV	Romaric
23	DF	ESP	Lolo
24	DF	FRA	Abdoulay Konko
25	MF	ARG	Diego Perotti
26	GK	ESP	Dani Jiménez
27	FW	ESP	Enrique Carreño
28	DF	ESP	Cala
30	MF	ESP	José Carlos
31	FW	ESP	Rodri
33	DF	ESP	Manuel Redondo
34	DF	ESP	Marc Valiente
37	DF	ESP	Antonio Luna
42	FW	ESP	Luis Alberto

=== Long-term injuries ===
On 1 January 2010, Sevilla's medical services detected some cardiac pathology in Sergio Sánchez's heart and they recommended to him to stop his activity with the team.

Note: Flags indicate national team as defined under FIFA eligibility rules; some limited exceptions apply. Players may hold more than one non-FIFA nationality.

No.	Pos.	Nation	Player
17	DF	ESP	Sergio Sánchez

=== CAN 2010 called players ===
Note: Flags indicate national team as defined under FIFA eligibility rules; some limited exceptions apply. Players may hold more than one non-FIFA nationality.

No.	Pos.	Nation	Player
12	FW	MLI	Frédéric Kanouté (Out between 11 Jan and 20 Jan)
8	MF	CIV	Didier Zokora (Out between 11 Jan and 24 Jan)

== Players' statistics ==
=== Liga BBVA ===
Updated to 4 April 2010

No.	Player	Pos.	Status	Played	Goal	Booked	Sent off (straight red)	Minutes	Sanctioned against	
1	(Spain) Andrés Palop	GK		25	−31	1	0	2378	None yet	
2	(Argentina) Federico Fazio	DF		7	1	0	0	630	None yet	
3	(Serbia) Ivica Dragutinović	DF		17	2	6	0	1604	x5 (yellow card)	v. Valencia (31 Jan)
4	(France) Sébastien Squillaci	DF		13	1	4	0	1031	None yet	
5	(Argentina) Aldo Duscher	MF		10	0	5	1	636	Booked Sent off (straight red)	v. Racing Santander (9 Jan)
6	(Brazil) Gatão	MF		21	0	5	0	1681	x5 (yellow card)	v. Málaga (10 Apr)
7	(Spain) Jesús Navas	MF		26	3	4	0	2109	None yet	
8	(Ivory Coast) Didier Zokora	MF		20	0	8	1	1729	x5 (yellow card)	v. Real Valladolid (5 Dec)
8	(Ivory Coast) Didier Zokora	MF		20	0	8	1	1729	Sent off (straight red)	v. Athletic Bilbao (28 Feb)
9	(Ivory Coast) Arouna Koné	FW	Out	12	0	1	0	371	None yet	
10	(Brazil) Luís Fabiano	FW		17	10	7	0	1246	x5 (yellow card)	v. Sporting Gijón (13 Dec)
11	(Brazil) Renato	MF		26	4	2	0	2120	None yet	
12	(Mali) Frédéric Kanouté	FW		20	7	5	1	1312	Booked Sent off (straight red)	v. Real Zaragoza (12 Sep)
13	(Spain) Javi Varas	GK		5	–4	0	0	477	None yet	
14	(France) Julien Escudé	DF		17	0	4	0	1599	None yet	
15	(Lithuania) Marius Stankevičius	DF		12	0	3	1	1101	Sent off (straight red)	v. Osasuna (14 Feb)
15	(Uruguay) Javier Chevantón	FW	Out	1	0	0	0	12	None yet	
16	(Spain) Diego Capel	MF		23	0	3	0	1027	None yet	
17	(Spain) Sergio Sánchez	DF		7	0	3	0	559	None yet	
18	(Spain) Fernando Navarro	DF		24	0	8	0	2078	x5 (yellow card)	v. Real Zaragoza (7 Feb)
19	(Spain) Álvaro Negredo	FW		28	7	0	2	1772	Sent off (straight red)	v. Osasuna (14 Feb)
19	(Spain) Álvaro Negredo	FW		28	7	0	2	1772	Sent off (straight red)	v. Athletic Bilbao (28 Feb)
20	(Belgium) Tom De Mul	MF		0	0	0	0	0	None yet	
21	(Argentina) Lautaro Acosta	MF		5	0	0	0	163	None yet	
22	(Ivory Coast) Romaric	MF		15	1	3	1	785	Sent off (straight red)	v. Real Madrid (6 Mar)
23	(Spain) Lolo	DF		15	0	2	0	711	None yet	
24	(France) Abdoulay Konko	DF		15	1	1	0	1175	None yet	
25	(Argentina) Diego Perotti	MF		26	4	4	0	1742	None yet	
26	(Spain) Dani Jiménez	GK		0	0	0	0	0	None yet	
27	(Spain) Enrique Carreño	FW		1	0	0	0	46	None yet	
28	(Spain) Cala	DF		1	0	0	0	96	None yet	
30	(Spain) José Carlos	MF		7	1	0	0	235	None yet	
31	(Spain) Rodri	FW		1	0	0	0	4	None yet	
33	(Spain) Manuel Redondo	DF		0	0	0	0	0	None yet	
34	(Spain) Marc Valiente	DF		3	0	2	0	183	None yet	
36	(Spain) Luis Alberto	FW		0	0	0	0	0	None yet	

Booked	Yellow cards
Sent off (straight red)	Red cards
Goal	Goals scored Received, if the number is negative (only for GK)
x5 (yellow card)	Sanctioned by the accumulation of 5 yellow cards Every 5 yellow cards, the player misses next match
Booked Sent off (straight red)	Sanctioned by double yellow card
Sent off (straight red)	Sanctioned by sent off
	Ready to play
	Injured
Out	Out on loan From winter transfers to the end of the season
€	Sold during winter transfers
	Leader in this statistic

== Match results ==
- All times are in GMT

=== Pre-season ===
==== Friendly matches ====
18 July 2009	UD Roteña	0–7	Sevilla	Antonio Puntas Velas Stadium, Rota (Cádiz)
		(Report)	12' Carreño; 26', 37' Koné; 32' Navas; 78', 83' Alfaro; 88' José Carlos	Attendance: 4,000

19 July 2009	Conil	0–1	Sevilla	J. A. Pérez Stadium, Conil de la Frontera (Cádiz)
		(Report)	26' Chevantón	Attendance: 2,500

30 July 2009	Sevilla	1–0	Olympique Lyon	Guadalquivir Stadium, Coria del Río
21:00	Chevantón 85'; Lolo (yellow card); Casado (yellow card)	(Report)	(red card) 53' Makoun; (red card) 60' Clerc; (yellow card) Grosso; (yellow card) Bodmer	Attendance: 1,000; Referee: (Spain) Antonio Santos Pargaña

5 August 2009	Chiclana	0–7	Sevilla	Municipal Ground, Chiclana de la Frontera (Cádiz)
		(Report)	2', 16' Alfaro; 18' Chevantón; 49', 86', 89' Romaric; 90' Koné

8 August 2009	Sevilla	0–1	Mallorca	Stadio Renzo Barbera, Palermo
			18' (o.g.) Squillaci

8 August 2009	Palermo	1–0	Sevilla	Stadio Renzo Barbera, Palermo
	Miccoli 35'

==== 2009 Peace Cup ====
GROUP A	Pld	W	D	L	GF	GA	GD	Pts
Juventus	2	2	0	0	5	1	+4	6
Sevilla	2	0	1	1	1	2	-1	1
Seongnam Ilhwa	2	0	1	1	0	3	-3	1

24 July 2009 Group stage	Sevilla	1–2	Juventus	Estadio Olímpico de La Cartuja, Seville
21:30	Squillaci 80'	(Report)	26' Amauri; (yellow card) 34' Cannavaro; (yellow card) 39' Zebina; (yellow card) 57' Marchisio; 65' Iaquinta; (yellow card) 78' Zanetti	Attendance: 15,000; Referee: Stephan Johannensson

26 July 2009 Group stage	Sevilla	0–0	Seongnam Ilhwa	Estadio Ramón Sánchez Pizjuán, Seville
19:30		(Report)		Attendance: 2,000; Referee: Alon Yefet

==== 55th Ramón de Carranza Trophy ====
Semi-finals
13 August – Cádiz
Cádiz	1
Deportivo	3
14 August – Cádiz
Sevilla	2
Valencia	0

Final
15 August – Cádiz
Deportivo	0
Sevilla FC	1
Third place
15 August – Cádiz
Cádiz	2
Valencia	1

14 August 2009 Semifinal	Sevilla	2–0	Valencia	Estadio Ramón de Carranza, Cádiz
21:00	Adriano 49', (yellow card); Koné 90+2'; Palop (yellow card); Zokora (yellow card)	(Report)	(yellow card) Bruno	Attendance: 8,000; Referee: (Spain) José Luis Paradas Romero

15 August 2009 Final	Deportivo La Coruña	0–1	Sevilla	Estadio Ramón de Carranza, Cádiz
21:00	Lopo (yellow card); Adrián (yellow card)	(Report)	81' Escudé	Attendance: 6,000; Referee: (Spain) Javier Turienzo Álvarez

==== 2nd Antonio Puerta Trophy ====
21 August 2009 Final	Sevilla	2–1	Xerez	Estadio Ramón Sánchez Pizjuán, Seville
20:30	José Carlos 39'; Perotti 50'; Dragutinović (yellow card)	(Report)	87' Míchel; (yellow card) Francis	Attendance: 21,000; Referee: (Spain) Andrés Ceballos Silva

=== La Liga ===
Matchday	1	2	3	4	5	6	7	8	9	10	11	12	13	14	15	16	17	18	19	20	21	22	23	24	25	26	27	28	29	30	31	32	33	34	35	36	37	38
Result against	VAL	ZAR	OSA	MLL	ATH	RMA	DEP	ESP	XER	VIL	TEN	MGA	VAD	SPG	GET	ATM	RAC	FCB	ALM	VAL	ZAR	OSA	MLL	ATH	RMA	DEP	ESP	XER	VIL	TEN	MGA	VAD	SPG	GET	ATM	RAC	FCB	ALM
Venue	A	H	A	H	A	H	A	H	A	H	A	H	H	A	H	A	H	A	H	H	A	H	A	H	A	H	A	H	A	H	A	A	H	A	H	A	H	A
Position	16	8	6	3	3	3	3	3	3	3	3	3	4	3	3	5	5	6	6	4	5	4	4	4	4	4	5	5	5	4	4	5	5	5	5	4	4	4
Goal Average (useful in case of tie)^{3}																				Lost	Won	Won	Won	Won	Won	Lost	Lost	Won	Lost	Won	Won	Lost	Won	Lost	Won	Won	Lost	Won

		All							Home					Away				
		Pts	W	D	L	F	A	Dif.	W	D	L	F	A	W	D	L	F	A
4	Sevilla	63	19	6	13	65	49	16	10	6	3	33	18	9	0	10	32	31

30 August 2009 1	Valencia	2–0	Sevilla	Mestalla, Valencia
18:00	Miguel (yellow card) 18'; Mata 47'; Hernández 80'	(Report)	(yellow card) 6' Navarro; (yellow card) 22' (yellow-red card) 45' Kanouté; (yellow card) 85' Squillaci	Referee: Antonio Rubinos Pérez

12 September 2009 2	Sevilla	4–1	Zaragoza	Ramón Sánchez Pizjuán, Seville
21:00	Konko 8'; Zokora (yellow card) 28'; Luís Fabiano 45', 85'; Perotti 57'; Escudé (yellow card) 83'; Palop (yellow card) 89'	(Report)	33' Arizmendi; (yellow card) 71' Laguardia; (yellow card) 72' Obradović; (yellow card) 89' Ayala	Referee: Bernardino González Vázquez

19 September 2009 3	Osasuna	0–2	Sevilla	Reyno de Navarra, Pamplona
19:00	Masoud (yellow card) 17'; Calleja (yellow card) 67'; Puñal (yellow card) 70'; Aranda (yellow card) 79'; Sergio (red card) 82'	(Report)	37' Negredo; (yellow card) 44' Zokora; 70' Kanouté; (yellow card) 88' Sánchez; (yellow card) 89' Lolo	Referee: Carlos Clos Gómez

22 September 2009 4	Sevilla	2–0	Mallorca	Ramón Sánchez Pizjuán, Seville
19:00	Squillaci 17' (yellow card) 89'; Perotti 25'	(Report)	(yellow card) 49' Varela	Referee: Carlos Velasco Carballo

26 September 2009 5	Athletic Bilbao	0–4	Sevilla	San Mamés, Bilbao
17:00	Martínaz (yellow card) 14'; Amorebieta (yellow card) 44' (yellow-red card) 54'; Bóveda (yellow card) 60'	(Report)	19' (yellow card) 65' Renato; 20' Negredo; (yellow card) 23' Dragutinović; 44' Kanouté; 74' Navas	Referee: Fernando Teixeira Vitienes

4 October 2009 6	Sevilla	2–1	Real Madrid	Ramón Sánchez Pizjuán, Seville
20:00	Luís Fabiano (yellow card) 20'; Navas 33'; Zokora (yellow card) 35'; Perotti (yellow card) 35'; Adriano (yellow card) 60'; Renato 66'	(Report)	(yellow card) 18' Ramos; (yellow card) 35' Guti; 48' Pepe; (yellow card) 70' Kaká	Attendance: 43,225; Referee: Eduardo Iturralde González

17 October 2009 7	Deportivo La Coruña	1–0	Sevilla	Riazor, A Coruña
17:00	Rodríguez 37'	(Report)	(yellow card) 78' Sánchez	Referee: Antonio Miguel Mateu Lahoz

24 October 2009 8	Sevilla	0–0	Espanyol	Ramón Sánchez Pizjuán, Seville
21:00	Escudé (yellow card) 74'; Squillaci (yellow card) 76'	(Report)	(yellow card) 18' (yellow-red card) 59' Pareja; (yellow card) 51' D. García; (yellow card) 76' Alonso; (yellow card) 80' Pillud; (yellow card) 88' L. García; (yellow card) 89' Kameni	Referee: Javier Turienzo Álvarez

31 October 2009 9	Xerez	0–2	Sevilla	Chapín, Jerez de la Frontera (Cádiz)
19:00	Leandro (yellow card) 14'; Calvo (yellow card) 26'; Casado (yellow card) 44'; Keita (yellow card) 50'	(Report)	(yellow card) 22' Navarro; (yellow card) 25' Dragutinović; 42' Negredo; (yellow card) 70' Duscher; 89' Luís Fabiano	Referee: Bernardino González Vázquez

8 November 2009 10	Sevilla	3–2	Villarreal	Ramón Sánchez Pizjuán, Seville
20:00	Luís Fabiano 9', 61', (yellow card) 25'; Zokora (yellow card) 41'; Kanouté 65'	(Report)	28' Pires; (yellow card) 47' Venta; 59' Fuster; (yellow card) 62' Godín	Referee: Carlos Delgado Ferreiro

21 November 2009 11	Tenerife	1–2	Sevilla	Heliodoro Rodríguez López, Tenerife
17:00	Omar (yellow card) 14'; Bellvís (yellow card) 50'; Nino 75', (yellow card) 81'; Luna (yellow card) 87'	(Report)	31', (yellow card) 40' Perotti; (yellow card) 38' Luís Fabiano; 47' Renato; (yellow card) 89' Navas	Referee: Xavier Estrada Fernández

28 November 2009 12	Sevilla	2–2	Málaga	Ramón Sánchez Pizjuán, Seville
21:00	Luís Fabiano (yellow card) 27', (goal) 57', 72'; Navas (yellow card) 45'; Zokora (yellow card) 51'; Capel (yellow card) 82'	(Report)	(red card) 10' Luque; 22' Fernando; (yellow card) 36' Baha; (yellow card) 42' Mtiliga; 44' Duda; (yellow card) 77' Obinna; (yellow card) 77' Forestieri	Referee: Fernando Teixeira Vitienes

5 December 2009	Sevilla	1–1	Real Valladolid	Ramón Sánchez Pizjuán, Seville
17:00	Fabiano 44', (yellow card) 86'; Navas (yellow card) 50'; Dragutinović (yellow card) 55'; Romaric (yellow card) 86'	(Report)	(yellow card) 7' Costa; (yellow card) 20' Nivaldo; 33' Manucho; (red card) 38' Borja; (yellow card) 42' Pelé; (yellow card) 81' Villar	Referee: Alfonso Pérez Burrull

13 December 2009	Sporting de Gijón	0–1	Sevilla	El Molinón, Gijón
20:00	Míchel (yellow card) 23'; Pedro (yellow card) 62'; Grégory (yellow card) 70'; José Ángel (yellow card) 72'; Lora (yellow card) 89'	(Report)	12' Kanouté; (yellow card) 34' Valiente; (yellow card) 83' Navarro; (yellow card) 89' Konko	Referee: Miguel Ángel Pérez Lasa

19 December 2009	Sevilla	1–2	Getafe	Ramón Sánchez Pizjuán, Seville
19:00	Negredo 51'; Sánchez (yellow card) 74'	(Report)	11', 33' (yellow card) 90' Soldado; (yellow card) 43' Albín; (yellow card) 49' Parejo; (yellow card) 76' Mané; (yellow card) 82' Pedro León	Referee: José Luis González González

2 January 2010	Atlético de Madrid	2–1	Sevilla	Vicente Calderón, Madrid
21:00	Perea (yellow card) 3'; Simão (yellow card) 30'; Dragutinović 48' (o.g.); López (yellow card) 88' (goal) 90+4'	(Report)	(yellow card) 39' Navas; 44' Renato; (yellow card) 57' Dragutinović; (yellow card) 65' (yellow-red card) 73' Duscher; (yellow card) 90' Koné	Referee: Alberto Undiano Mallenco

9 January 2010	Sevilla	1–2	Racing Santander	Ramón Sánchez Pizjuán, Seville
19:00	Adriano (yellow card) 37'; Romaric 62', (yellow card) 88'	(Report)	26', 38' Canales; (yellow card) 33' Colsa; (yellow card) 88' Henrique; (yellow card) 89' Munitis	Referee: Manuel Enrique Mejuto González

16 January 2010	Barcelona	4–0	Sevilla	Camp Nou, Barcelona
21:00	Escudé 48' (o.g.); Abidal (yellow card) 63'; Busquets (yellow card) 64'; Pedro 69'; Messi 84', 90+1'	(Report)	(yellow card) 36' Valiente; (yellow card) 47' Lolo; (yellow card) 54' Navarro; (yellow card) 75' Duscher	Attendance: 63,274; Referee: Carlos Delgado Ferreiro

23 January 2010	Sevilla	1–0	Almería	Ramón Sánchez Pizjuán, Seville
17:00	Negredo 9'; Dragutinović (yellow card) 14'; Escudé (yellow card) 76'	(Report)	(yellow card) 28' Ortiz; (yellow card) 61' Corona; (yellow card) 90' Acasiete; (yellow card) 90' Soriano	Referee: Antonio Miguel Mateu Lahoz

31 January 2010	Sevilla	2–1	Valencia	Ramón Sánchez Pizjuán, Seville
20:00	Zokora (yellow card) 16'; Negredo 20', 68'; Stankevičius (yellow card) 30'; Escudé (yellow card) 51'; Perotti (yellow card) 70'	(Report)	(yellow card) 23' Albelda; (yellow card) 26', (goal) 88' Navarro; (yellow card) 82' Bruno; (yellow card) 89' Žigić	Referee: Miguel Ángel Pérez Lasa

7 February 2010	Real Zaragoza	2–1	Sevilla	La Romareda, Zaragoza
18:00	Herrera (yellow card) 18'; Contini 31'; Carrizo (yellow card) 34'; Negredo 42' (o.g.); Arizmendi (yellow card) 45'; Colunga (yellow card) 47' (yellow-red card) 90+2'; Jarošík (yellow card) 66'; Pennant (yellow card) 71'	(Report)	34' Kanouté; (yellow card) 42' Duscher; (red card) 81' Negredo; (red card) 89' Stankevičius	Referee: César Muñiz Fernández

14 February 2010	Sevilla	1–0	Osasuna	Ramón Sánchez Pizjuán, Seville
18:00	Luís Fabiano 35'; Renato (yellow card) 61'	(Report)	(yellow card) 43' Echaide; (yellow card) 53' Monreal; (yellow card) 63' Calleja	Referee: Xavier Estrada Fernández

20 February 2010	Mallorca	1–3	Sevilla	ONO Estadi, Mallorca
21:00	Suárez 5'; Martí (yellow card) 37'; Ramis (red card) 45'; Rubén (yellow card) 54'; Nunes (yellow card) 90'	(Report)	(yellow card) 17' (red card) 90+1' Zokora; 23' Navas; (red card) 25' Negredo; (yellow card) 41' Luís Fabiano; 57' Dragutinović; 62' Perotti	Referee: Fernando Teixeira Vitienes

28 February 2010	Sevilla	0–0	Athletic Bilbao	Ramón Sánchez Pizjuán, Seville
18:00	Romaric (red card) 53'; Kanouté (yellow card) 63'	(Report)	(yellow card) 15' Iraola; (yellow card) 29' Castillo; (yellow card) 54' Gabilondo; (yellow card) 62' Iturraspe; (yellow card) 80' Iraizoz; (yellow card) 89' Susaeta	Referee: César Muñiz Fernández

6 March 2010	Real Madrid	3–2	Sevilla	Santiago Bernabéu, Madrid
21:00	Arbeloa (yellow card) 30'; Ronaldo 59'; Ramos 63'; Marcelo (yellow card) 88'; Van der Vaart 90+2', (yellow card) 90+3'	(Report)	9' (o.g.) Alonso; (yellow card) 13' (goal) 51' Dragutinović; (yellow card) 25' Stankevičius; (yellow card) 43' Capel; (yellow card) 57' Navarro; (yellow card) 62' Kanouté	Referee: Eduardo Iturralde González

13 March 2010	Sevilla	1–1	Deportivo La Coruña	Ramón Sánchez Pizjuán, Seville
21:00	Fazio 19'; Perotti (yellow card) 43'; Kanouté (yellow card) 69'	(Report)	(yellow card) 19' Colotto; 24' Adrián; (yellow card) 50' Domínguez; (yellow card) 69' Tomás; (yellow card) 75' Laure	Referee: Alfonso J. Álvarez Izquierdo

20 March 2010	Espanyol	2–0	Sevilla	Cornellà-El Prat, Cornellà de Llobregat
21:00	Osvaldo 8', 60', (yellow card) 23'; Callejón (yellow card) 36'; Márquez (yellow card) 50'	(Report)	(yellow card) 40' Adriano; (yellow card) 49' Squillaci	Referee: Antonio Miguel Mateu Lahoz

23 March 2010	Sevilla	1–1	Xerez	Ramón Sánchez Pizjuán, Seville
21:00	Kanouté 63' (pen.)	(Report)	(yellow card) 43', (goal) 90+1' Gioda; (yellow card) 69' Casado	Referee: Miguel Ángel Ayza Gámez

- With Antonio Álvarez

28 March 2010	Villarreal	3–0	Sevilla	El Madrigal, Villarreal (Castellón)
18:00	Rossi 5'; Llorente 17', (yellow card) 48'; Bruno (yellow card) 90'; Pires 90+1'	(Report)	(yellow card) 48' Romaric; (yellow card) 58' Adriano; (yellow card) 75' Navarro	Referee: Javier Turienzo Álvarez

3 April 2010	Sevilla	3–0	Tenerife	Ramón Sánchez Pizjuán, Sevilla
21:00	Kanouté 21'; Stankevičius (yellow card) 29'; Luís Fabiano 43', (yellow card) 65'; Adriano (yellow card) 69'; Navarro (yellow card) 75'; Capel (yellow card) 78'; José Carlos 87'	(Report)	(yellow card) 13' Luna; (yellow card) 56' Bertrán; (yellow card) 67' Richi; (yellow card) 82' Ángel	Referee: Eduardo Iturralde González

10 April 2010	Málaga	1–2	Sevilla	La Rosaleda, Málaga
17:00	Caicedo 16'; Juanito (yellow card) 38'; Orozco (yellow card) 51'; Toribio (yellow card) 65'; Gámez (yellow card) 66'	(Report)	(yellow card) 27' Dragutinović; (yellow card) 56', (goal) 66' Cala; (yellow card) 62' Escudé; (yellow card) 81' Navarro; 85' Lolo; (yellow card) 90+1' Romaric	Referee: Xavier Estrada Fernández

13 April 2010	Real Valladolid	2–1	Sevilla	Nuevo José Zorrilla, Valladolid
19:00	Sereno (yellow card) 4'; Barragán (yellow card) 14'; Costa 41'; Del Horno (yellow card) 49'; Manucho 53'; Nauzet (yellow card) 58'; Baraja (yellow card) 88'	(Report)	(yellow card) 39' Palop; 82' Cala	Attendance: 18,961; Referee: Alfonso J. Álvarez Izquierdo

17 April 2010	Sevilla	3–0	Sporting Gijón	Ramón Sánchez Pizjuán, Sevilla
17:00	Kanouté 8'; Navarro (yellow card) 18'; Fabiano (yellow card) 45+1', (goal) 53'; Adriano (yellow card) 71'; Cala 80'	(Report)	(yellow card) 6' Smiljanić; (yellow card) 16' (yellow-red card) 79' José Ángel; (yellow card) 22' (yellow-red card) 32' Bilić; (yellow card) 32' Sastre; (yellow card) 45+1' Grégory; (yellow card) 59' Lora	Referee: Carlos Velasco Carballo

25 April 2010	Getafe	4–3	Sevilla	El Coliséum, Getafe (Madrid)
20:00	Adrián 16'; Mané (yellow card) 44'; Miku (yellow card) 56'; Pedro León 58', (yellow card) 63'; Del Moral 75'; Casquero (yellow card) 86'; Díaz (yellow card) 90+1'; Parejo 90+4' (pen.)	(Report)	(yellow card) 19' Stankevičius; (yellow card) 21' (yellow-red card) 84' (goal) 38' Kanouté; 33', 60' Luís Fabiano; (yellow card) 45' Escudé; (yellow card) 90+3' Lolo	Referee: Carlos Clos Gómez

2 May 2010	Sevilla	3–1	Atlético Madrid	Ramón Sánchez Pizjuán, Sevilla
16:00	Luís Fabiano 5'; Negredo 12' (pen.), 39' (pen.); Navarro (yellow card) 32'; Konko (yellow card) 81'	(Report)	7' Tiago; (yellow card) 11' Agüero; (yellow card) 38' Perea; (yellow card) 58' Salvio; (yellow card) 88' Cabrera	Referee: Alfonso Pérez Burrull

5 May 2010	Racing Santander	1–5	Sevilla	El Sardinero, Santander
19:00	Morris (yellow card) 19' (yellow-red card) 77'; Diop (yellow card) 21'; Tchité 60', (yellow card) 72'	(Report)	2', 90+1' Negredo; 21' Kanouté; (yellow card) 36' Zokora; 46' Navas; 47' Capel	Referee: Miguel Ángel Pérez Lasa

8 May 2010	Sevilla	2–3	Barcelona	Ramón Sánchez Pizjuán, Sevilla
20:00	Konko (yellow card) 11' (yellow-red card) 53'; Luís Fabiano (yellow card) 29', (goal) 70'; Zokora (yellow card) 41'; Kanouté 68'; Lolo (yellow card) 73'; Capel (yellow card) 77'	(Report)	5' Messi; (yellow card) 22' Busquets; 27', (yellow card) 87' Bojan; (yellow card) 43', (goal) 62' Pedro; (yellow card) 53' Maxwell; (yellow card) 70' Xavi; (yellow card) 90' Valdés	Referee: Alberto Undiano Mallenco

15 May 2010	Almería	2–3	Sevilla	Juegos del Mediterráneo, Almería
21:00	Soriano (yellow card) 4', (goal) 44'; Crusat (yellow card) 13'; Ortiz (yellow card) 50', (goal) 79'	(Report)	(yellow card) 10' Zokora; 16' Kanouté; (yellow card) 24' Stankevičius; (yellow card) 52' Squillaci; 53', (red card) 65' Negredo; 90+3', (yellow card) 90+5' Rodri	Referee: Antonio Rubinos Pérez

=== UEFA Champions League ===
==== Group stage ====
Group G
	Pld	W	D	L	GF	GA	GD	Pts
(Spain) Sevilla	6	4	1	1	11	4	+7	13
(Germany) VfB Stuttgart	6	2	3	1	9	7	+2	9
(Romania) Unirea Urziceni	6	2	2	2	8	8	0	8
(Scotland) Rangers	6	0	2	4	4	13	−9	2

16 September 2009 1	Sevilla (Spain)	2–0	(Romania) Unirea Urziceni	Seville, Spain
19:45	Luís Fabiano 45+1'; Renato 70'; Zokora (yellow card) 72'	(Report)	(yellow card) 10' Mehmedović; (yellow card) 26' Frunză; (yellow card) 31' Maftei; (yellow card) 54' Galamaz	Stadium: Ramón Sánchez Pizjuán; Attendance: 37,500; Referee: Matteo Trefoloni (Italy)

29 September 2009 2	Rangers (Scotland)	1–4	(Spain) Sevilla	Glasgow, Scotland
19:45	Naismith (yellow card) 58'; Novo 88'	(Report)	50' Konko; 64' Adriano; 72' Luís Fabiano; 74' Kanouté; (yellow card) 77' Capel; (yellow card) 90+3' Navarro	Stadium: Ibrox Stadium; Attendance: 40,572; Referee: Jonas Eriksson (Sweden)

20 October 2009 3	Stuttgart (Germany)	1–3	(Spain) Sevilla	Stuttgart^{1}, Germany
19:45	Tasci (yellow card) 71'; Élson 74'	(Report)	23', 72' Squillaci; 55' Navas; (yellow card) 57' Navarro; (yellow card) 73' Dragutinović; (yellow card) 79' Duscher	Stadium: Mercedes-Benz Arena; Attendance: 37,000; Referee: Pieter Vink (Netherlands)

4 November 2009 4	Sevilla (Spain)	1–1	(Germany) Stuttgart	Seville, Spain
19:45	Navas 14'; Escudé (yellow card) 54'	(Report)	(yellow card) 12' Élson; (yellow card) 45+1' Hilbert; (yellow card) 49' Boka; 79' Kuzmanović	Stadium: Ramón Sánchez Pizjuán; Attendance: 32,669; Referee: Martin Atkinson (England)

24 November 2009 5	Unirea Urziceni (Romania)	1–0	(Spain) Sevilla	Bucharest^{2}, Romania
19:45	Vilana (yellow card) 23'; Dragutinović 45' (o.g.); Apostol (yellow card) 49'; Galamaz (yellow card) 75'; Maftei (yellow card) 83'	(Report)	(yellow card) 52' Navas	Stadium: Stadionul Steaua; Attendance: 10,007; Referee: Tom Henning Øvrebø (Norway)

9 December 2009 6	Sevilla (Spain)	1–0	(Scotland) Rangers	Seville, Spain
19:45	Kanouté 8' (pen.)	(Report)	(yellow card) 35' Papac; (yellow card) 74' Lafferty; (yellow card) 84' Bougherra	Stadium: Ramón Sánchez Pizjuán; Attendance: 31,560; Referee: Bertrand Layec (France)

==== Knockout phase ====
===== Round of 16 =====
24 February 2010 First leg	CSKA Moscow (Russia)	1–1	(Spain) Sevilla	Moscow, Russia
17:30	González 66', (yellow card) 80'; Aldonin (yellow card) 78'; Honda (yellow card) 82'	(Report)	25' Negredo	Stadium: Luzhniki Stadium; Attendance: 28,600; Referee: Felix Brych (Germany)

16 March 2010 Second leg	Sevilla (Spain)	1–2 (2–3 agg.)	(Russia) CSKA Moscow	Seville, Spain
19:45	Perotti 41'; Luís Fabiano (yellow card) 52'	(Report)	(yellow card) 20' Berezutski; 39' Necid; 55' Honda; (yellow card) 61' Schennikov; (yellow card) 70' González; (yellow card) 71' Šemberas	Stadium: Ramón Sánchez Pizjuán; Attendance: 40,000; Referee: Viktor Kassai (Hungary)

=== Copa del Rey ===
==== Matches ====
===== Round of 32 =====
27 October 2009 Round of 32 (1st leg)	Atlético Ciudad	2–4	Sevilla	Cartagonova, Cartagena (Murcia)^{2}
19:00	Roldán 9', 21'; Cruz (yellow card) 58'; Poveda (yellow card) 73'; Francisco (yellow card) 75'; Valero (yellow card) 78'	(Report)	18', 19' Fabiano; (yellow card) 24' Dragutinović; 27' Navas; 35' (yellow card) 84' Capel; (yellow card) 39' Lolo; (yellow card) 49' Sánchez	Referee: Alfonso J. Álvarez Izquierdo

10 November 2009 Round of 32 (2nd leg)	Sevilla	5–1	Atlético Ciudad	Ramón Sánchez Pizjuán, Sevilla
19:00	Navas 51'; Kanouté 58'; Luís Fabiano 63'; José Carlos 65', 87'	(Report)	46' Josu; (yellow card) 54' José; (yellow card) 62' Raúl; (yellow card) 70' Valero; (yellow card) 86' Alberto	Referee: José Luis González González

- Sevilla won 9–3 on aggregate.

===== Round of 16 =====
5 January 2010 Round of 16 (1st leg)	Barcelona	1–2	Sevilla	Camp Nou, Barcelona
21:00	Thiago (yellow card) 40'; Márquez (yellow card) 44'; Milito (yellow card) 52'; Ibrahimović 73'; Chyhrynskyi (yellow card) 74'; Bojan (yellow card) 79'; Maxwell (yellow card) 82'	(Report)	(yellow card) 42' Escudé; (yellow card) 53' Navarro; 60' Capel; (yellow card) 65' Lolo; 74' (pen.) Negredo; (yellow card) 76' Palop	Attendance: 48,167; Referee: Alfonso Pérez Burrull

13 January 2010 Round of 16 (2nd leg)	Sevilla	0–1	Barcelona	Ramón Sánchez Pizjuán, Sevilla
21:00	Duscher (yellow card) 51'; Lolo (yellow card) 60'; Navas (yellow card) 69'; Navarro (yellow card) 82'; Romaric (yellow card) 89'	(Report)	63' Xavi; (yellow card) 75' Messi; (yellow card) 88' Henry; (yellow card) 89' Piqué	Referee: Carlos Clos Gómez

- Sevilla 2–2 Barcelona on aggregate. Sevilla won on away goals.

===== Quarter-finals =====
20 January 2010 Quarterfinals (1st leg)	Deportivo	0–3	Sevilla	Riazor, A Coruña
21:00		(Report)	26' Negredo; 67' Renato; 69' Navas	Referee: Eduardo Iturralde González

27 January 2010 Quarterfinals (2nd leg)	Sevilla	0–1	Deportivo	Ramón Sánchez Pizjuán, Sevilla
21:00	Navarro (yellow card) 88'	(Report)	43' Bodipo; (yellow card) 75' Piscu; (yellow card) 81' Rodríguez; (yellow card) 90+1' Rochela	Referee: Fernando Teixeira Vitienes

- Sevilla won 3–1 on aggregate.

===== Semi-finals =====
3 February 2010 Semifinals (1st leg)	Sevilla	2–0	Getafe	Ramón Sánchez Pizjuán, Sevilla
21:00	Zokora (yellow card) 34'; Luís Fabiano 45+1'; Romaric (yellow card) 69'; Adriano (yellow card) 73'; Mario 79' (o.g.); Stankevičius (yellow card) 84'; Duscher (yellow card) 88'	(Report)	(yellow card) 30' Soldado	Referee: Bernardino González Vázquez

10 February 2010 Semifinals (2nd leg)	Getafe	1–0	Sevilla	El Coliséum, Getafe (Madrid)
21:00	Boateng (yellow card) 24'; Soldado 51', (yellow card) 64'; Mané (yellow card) 66'	(Report)	(yellow card) 19' Palop; (yellow card) 32' Cala; (yellow card) 37' Navarro; (yellow card) 57' Romaric; (yellow card) 77' Luís Fabiano	Referee: Eduardo Iturralde González

- Sevilla won 2–1 on aggregate.

===== Final =====
19 May 2010
20:30

Sevilla	2–0	Atlético Madrid
Capel 5'; Navas 90+1'	(Report)

Camp Nou, Barcelona^{2}
Attendance: 93,000
Referee: Manuel Enrique Mejuto González

SEVILLA FC
GK	1	(Spain) Andrés Palop	(yellow card) 86'
DF	24	(France) Abdoulay Konko
DF	4	(France) Sébastien Squillaci	(yellow card) 62'
DF	14	(France) Julien Escudé
DF	37	(Spain) Antonio Luna	(yellow card) 36'
MF	7	(Spain) Jesús Navas	90+1'
MF	8	(Ivory Coast) Didier Zokora
MF	11	(Brazil) Renato	(yellow card) 7'	(substituted off) 90+2'
MF	16	(Spain) Diego Capel	5'	(substituted off) 88'
FW	12	(Mali) Frédéric Kanouté	(yellow card) 84'
FW	19	(Spain) Álvaro Negredo		(substituted off) 68'
Substitutes:
MF	22	(Ivory Coast) Romaric	(substituted on) 68'
MF	25	(Argentina) Diego Perotti	(substituted on) 88'
DF	23	(Spain) Lolo	(substituted on) 90+2'
GK	13	(Spain) Javi Varas
DF	18	(Spain) Fernando Navarro
DF	15	(Lithuania) Marius Stankevičius
FW	35	(Spain) Rodri
Manager:
(Spain) Antonio Álvarez

ATLÉTICO DE MADRID
GK	13	(Spain) David de Gea
DF	17	(Czech Republic) Tomáš Ujfaluši	(yellow card) 70'
DF	21	(Colombia) Luis Perea
DF	18	(Spain) Álvaro Domínguez
DF	3	(Spain) Antonio López
MF	19	(Spain) José Antonio Reyes
MF	12	(Brazil) Paulo Assunção		(substituted off) 61'
MF	5	(Portugal) Tiago
MF	20	(Portugal) Simão		(substituted off) 61'
FW	7	(Uruguay) Diego Forlán
FW	10	(Argentina) Sergio Agüero
Substitutes:
MF	8	(Spain) Raúl García	(substituted on) 61'
MF	9	(Spain) José Manuel Jurado	(substituted on) 61'
GK	42	(Spain) Joel Robles
DF	16	(Spain) Juanito
DF	2	(Spain) Juan Valera
MF	6	(Spain) Ignacio Camacho
FW	14	(Argentina) Eduardo Salvio
(Spain) Quique Sánchez Flores

Man of the Match:
(Spain) Jesús Navas (Sevilla)

Assistant referees:
(Spain) José Manuel Fernández Miranda
(Spain) Raúl Cabañero Martínez
Fourth official:
(Spain) Carlos Clos Gómez
Fifth official:
(Spain) Xavier Aguilar Rodríguez

== Others ==
=== Jiménez, sacked during the season ===
During 23 March's midnight, Sevilla's directive accorded to sack Manolo Jiménez after the draw obtained against Xerez, as Ramón Rodríguez Verdejo (also known as Monchi) assured to press.
Among the most significant causes include:

- The aggregate defeat playing in Round of 16 in Champions League against CSKA Moscow.
- The number of 3 points out of 15 between matchdays 24 and 28.
- The image given by the players from the 12th matchday against Málaga (on 28 November 2009).
- The loss of a style of play that took the team under the leadership of another managers (mainly between 2005–2007).
- The constants injuries suffered by important players such as Luís Fabiano, Jesús Navas or Diego Capel.
- The dialectical clash between Jiménez and Ramón Orellana (Sevilla FC's physical preparer) during a training season in January.

The directive was searching a new team manager for the last part of the season in foreign countries, but Antonio Álvarez will lead the team from 24 March to the end of the season. On the directive's search, Luis Aragonés and Laurent Blanc had many chances to become the new manager of Sevilla, but for the disagreement with the contract offered by José María del Nido, none of them had taken the job except Álvarez.
