= 2004–05 Sevilla FC season =

Sevilla
2004–05 season
- Head coach: Joaquín Caparrós
- Stadium: Estadio Ramón Sánchez Pizjuán
- La Liga: 6th
- Copa del Rey: Round of 32
- UEFA Cup: Round of 16
- Top goalscorer: League: Júlio Baptista (18); All: Júlio Baptista (25)

The 2004–05 season was the 116th season in the history of Sevilla FC and their fourth consecutive season in the top flight. The club participated in La Liga, the Copa del Rey, and the UEFA Cup.

== Pre-season and friendlies ==
Win Draw Loss

15 August 2004 Ramón de Carranza Trophy	Sevilla	2–1	Valencia	Cádiz
				Stadium: Ramón de Carranza

== Competitions ==
=== Overall record ===
Competition	First match	Last match	Starting round	Final position	Record							
Competition	First match	Last match	Starting round	Final position	Pld	W	D	L	GF	GA	GD	Win %
La Liga	29 August 2004	29 May 2005	Matchday 1		38	17	9	12	44	41	+3	44.74
Copa del Rey	27 October 2004	2 February 2005	Round of 64	Quarter-finals	6	5	0	1	10	6	+4	83.33
UEFA Cup	16 September 2004	17 March 2005	First round	Round of 16	10	5	2	3	12	7	+5	50.00
Total					54	27	11	16	66	54	+12	50.00

Source: BDFutbol

=== La Liga ===
==== League table ====
Pos	Team	Pld	W	D	L	GF	GA	GD	Pts	Qualification or relegation
4	Real Betis	38	16	14	8	62	50	+12	62	Qualification for the Champions League third qualifying round
5	Espanyol	38	17	10	11	54	46	+8	61	Qualification for the UEFA Cup first round
6	Sevilla	38	17	9	12	44	41	+3	60	Qualification for the UEFA Cup first round
7	Valencia	38	14	16	8	54	39	+15	58	Qualification for the Intertoto Cup third round
8	Deportivo La Coruña	38	12	15	11	46	50	−4	51 (Note: DEP: 8 pts; ATH: 4 pts → ATH 1–0 MLG; MLG: 4 pts → MLG 1–0 ATH)	Qualification for the Intertoto Cup second round

Source: LFP
Rules for classification: 1st points; 2nd head-to-head points; 3rd head-to-head goal difference; 4th head-to-head goals scored; 5th goal difference; 6th number of goals scored; 7th Fair-play points

==== Results summary ====
Overall								Home						Away					
Pld	W	D	L	GF	GA	GD	Pts	W	D	L	GF	GA	GD	W	D	L	GF	GA	GD
38	17	9	12	44	41	+3	60	10	5	4	25	19	+6	7	4	8	19	22	−3

Source: La Liga

==== Results by round ====
Round	1	2	3	4	5	6	7	8	9	10	11	12	13	14	15	16	17	18	19	20	21	22	23	24	25	26	27	28	29	30	31	32	33	34	35	36	37	38
Ground	H	A	H	A	H	A	A	H	A	H	A	H	A	H	A	H	A	H	A	A	H	A	H	A	H	H	A	H	A	H	A	H	A	H	A	H	A	H
Result	W	L	W	D	W	D	W	W	L	D	L	W	L	W	D	W	W	D	L	W	L	W	W	L	D	D	L	L	W	W	W	L	W	W	L	D	D	L
Position																																						

Source: La Liga
A = Away; H = Home; W = Win; D = Draw; L = Loss

=== Copa del Rey ===
27 October 2004 Second Round	Algeciras CF	–		Nuevo Mirador
			Carlos Aranda 46'

CAP Ciudad de Murcia	1–2	Sevilla	Murcia
Carlitos		Juan Pablo Úbeda Pesce 1'; Antoñito 82'	Stadium: Estadio de La Condomina; Attendance: 6,000; Referee: Carlos Megía Dávila

Recreativo de Huelva	-0–2	Sevilla	Nuevo Colombino
		Baptista (69 p)	Attendance: 11.056; Referee: Fernando Carmona Méndez

	2–1	Recreativo de Huelva	Sevilla
Ruiz; Aranda 73'		Jiménez 31'; Rodríguez (yellow card) 46'; Tornavaca (yellow card) 55'	Stadium: Ramón Sánchez Pizjuán; Attendance: 14,000; Referee: Julián Rodríguez Santiago

Sevilla	2–1	Osasuna	Sevilla
Antoñito 20'; Navas 78'		Izquierdo (yellow card) 17'; García (yellow card) 34'; John Aloisi (37 p); Cuéllar (yellow card) 46'; Valdo (yellow card) 48'; Clavero (yellow card) 86'	Stadium: Ramón Sánchez Pizjuán; Attendance: 30,000; Referee: César Muñiz Fernández

Osasuna	3–1	Sevilla	Pamplona
Valdo 34' (yellow card) 90'; García (yellow card) 41'; Carlos Cuéllar 71'; Muñoz 89'		Alfaro (yellow card) 33'; Redondo (yellow card) 39'; Alves (yellow card) 39'; Martí (yellow card) 69'Makukula 90'	Stadium: El Sadar; Attendance: 12,578; Referee: Miguel Pérez Lasa

=== UEFA Cup ===
==== First round ====
16 September 2004 First leg	Sevilla (Spain)	2–0	(Portugal) Nacional	Seville
21:00	Baptista 43'; Ramos 79'	https://www.uefa.com/uefaeuropaleague/match/79594--sevilla-vs-nacional/ Report]		Stadium: Ramón Sánchez Pizjuán Stadium; Referee: Grzegorz Gilewski (Poland)

30 September 2004 Second leg	Nacional (Portugal)	1–2 (1–4 agg.)	(Spain) Sevilla	Funchal, Portugal
21:00	Adriano 75'	https://www.uefa.com/uefaeuropaleague/match/79595--nacional-vs-sevilla/ Report]	Darío Silva 35'; Antoñito 82'	Stadium: Estádio dos Barreiros; Referee: Gianluca Paparesta (Italy)

==== Group stage ====
The group stage draw was held on 5 October 2004.

Pos	Team	Pld	W	D	L	GF	GA	GD	Pts	Qualification	LIL	SEV	AAC	ZEN	AEK
1	(France) Lille	4	3	0	1	5	3	+2	9	Advance to knockout stage	—	1–0	—	2–1	—
2	(Spain) Sevilla	4	2	1	1	6	4	+2	7	Advance to knockout stage	—	—	2–0	—	3–2
3	(Germany) Alemannia Aachen	4	2	1	1	5	4	+1	7	Advance to knockout stage	1–0	—	—	2–2	—
4	(Russia) Zenit Saint Petersburg	4	1	2	1	9	6	+3	5		—	1–1	—	—	5–1
5	(Greece) AEK Athens	4	0	0	4	4	12	−8	0		1–2	—	0–2	—	—

Source: RSSSF

==== Knockout phase ====
===== Round of 32 =====
16 February 2005	Panathinaikos (Greece)	1–0	(Spain) Sevilla	Leoforos Alexandras Stadium, Athens
19:00 (CET)	Vyntra 75'	Report		Attendance: 7,145; Referee: Claude Colombo (France)

24 February 2005	Sevilla (Spain)	2–0	(Greece) Panathinaikos	Ramón Sánchez Pizjuán Stadium, Seville
21:30 (CET)	Makukula 83'; Adriano 90+2'	Report		Attendance: 32,449; Referee: Tom Henning Øvrebø (Norway)

===== Round of 16 =====
10 March 2005	Sevilla (Spain)	0–0	(Italy) Parma	Ramón Sánchez Pizjuán Stadium, Seville
21:30 (CET)		Report		Attendance: 27,816; Referee: René Temmink (Netherlands)

17 March 2005	Parma (Italy)	1–0	(Spain) Sevilla	Stadio Ennio Tardini, Parma
20:45 (CET)	Cardone 19'	Report		Attendance: 7,650; Referee: Claus Bo Larsen (Denmark)
