= Mario Bermejo =

Spanish retired professional footballer

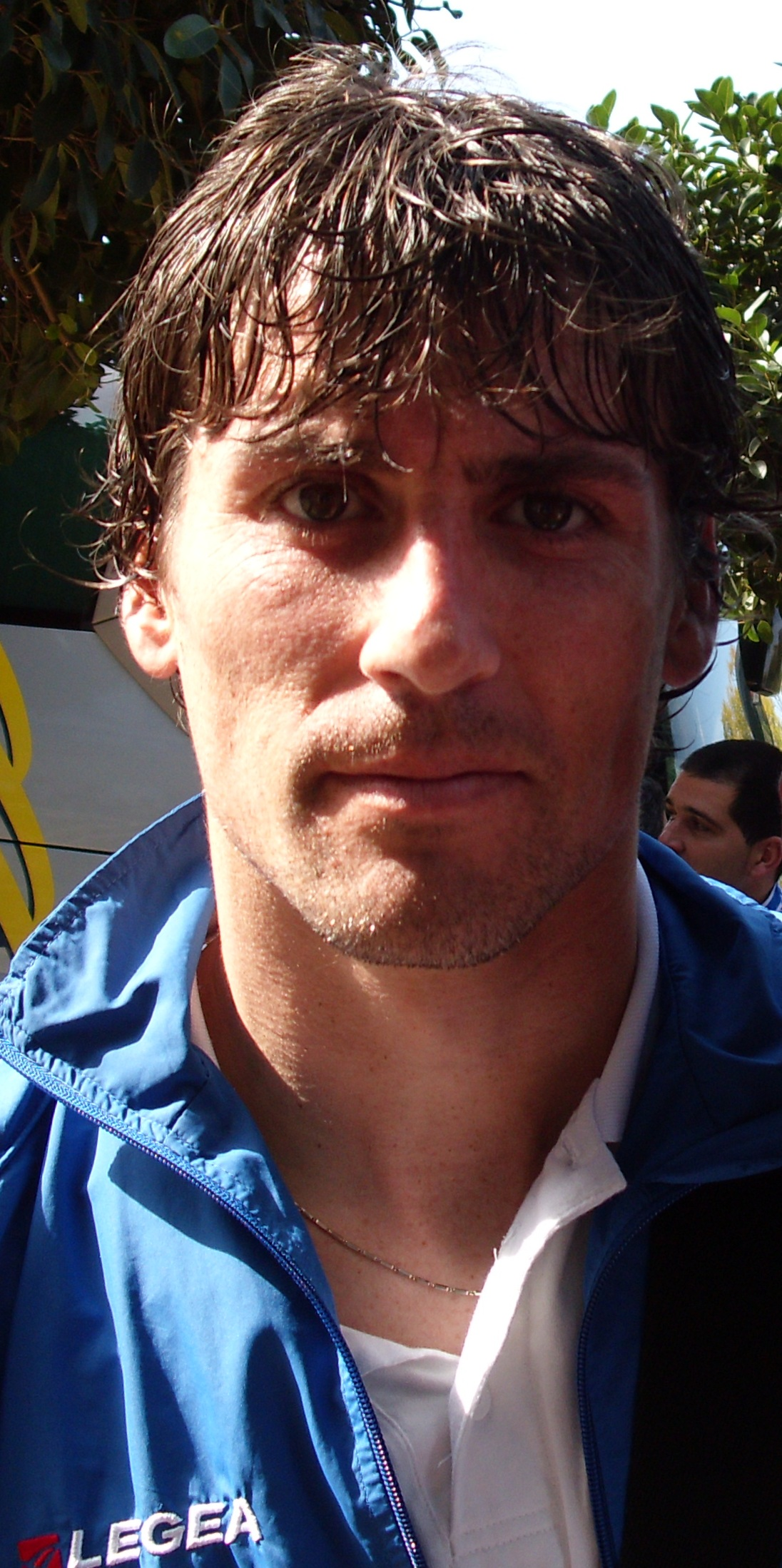
- Bermejo in 2009

Personal information
- Full name: Mario Bermejo Castanedo
- Date of birth: 7 October 1978 (age 48)
- Place of birth: Santander, Spain
- Height: 1.80 m (5 ft 11 in)
- Position: Striker

Youth career
- Perines
- Racing Santander

Senior career*
Years	Team	Apps	(Gls)
1995–1997	Racing B		
1995	Racing Santander	1	(0)
1997–2000	Bilbao Athletic	61	(16)
1998–2002	Athletic Bilbao	1	(0)
1998–1999	→ Cultural Leonesa (loan)	28	(3)
2000	→ Eibar (loan)	15	(1)
2000–2001	→ Gimnástica (loan)	31	(7)
2001–2002	→ Hospitalet (loan)	33	(8)
2002–2003	Recreativo	39	(0)
2004–2005	Racing Ferrol	55	(32)
2005–2006	Albacete	32	(9)
2006–2008	Almería	33	(5)
2007–2008	→ Poli Ejido (loan)	35	(5)
2008–2011	Xerez	101	(32)
2011–2014	Celta	81	(13)
Total		546	(131)

International career
1995	Spain U16	7	(2)
1996	Spain U18	3	(1)
- * Club domestic league appearances and goals

Mario Bermejo Castanedo (born 7 October 1978) is a Spanish former professional footballer who played as a striker.

A veteran in the Segunda División, he amassed totals of 267 games and 73 goals for eight clubs over nine seasons. In La Liga, he played for Racing de Santander, Athletic Bilbao, Recreativo, Xerez and Celta, scoring 12 goals for Xerez and 17 in total.

== Club career ==
Bermejo was born in Santander, Cantabria. In his early years he played one game each in La Liga with Racing de Santander and Athletic Bilbao, and then went on to represent teams in the lower leagues on loan. His official debut with Athletic came in a 1997–98 UEFA Cup match at UC Sampdoria, playing the final 32 minutes in the place of Ismael Urzaiz in an eventual 2–1 win; he was deemed eligible to play for the team because of his father's Basque roots and an uncle's connections to the club hierarchy.

For the 2002–03 season, Bermejo was released by Athletic and returned to the top flight with Recreativo de Huelva. In 2004–05, he was instrumental in helping Racing de Ferrol to retain their status, ending the campaign as top scorer with 25 goals – this included four past UD Almería in a 6–1 away victory, Ferrol's biggest ever in that league.

The following campaigns were also spent in the second division, with Albacete Balompié and Almería. He scored five league goals for the Andalusians in 2006–07, helping them to reach the top tier for the first time ever.

After a season-long loan at Polideportivo Ejido, Bermejo was released and joined another side in the region, Xerez CD. 2008–09 was highly productive both collectively (promotion, also a first-ever) and individually (12 league goals, third-best in the squad, to Momo's 17 and Antoñito's 13), and the player, aged 30, agreed to a new two-year contract. They were immediately relegated the following campaign, but the player ranked amongst the league's top scorers at 12, also netting in the last minute of a 2–1 home win against Almería on 1 May 2010.

Bermejo signed with division two's RC Celta de Vigo in late June 2011. He contributed eight goals from 35 appearances – 30 starts – in his first season as the Galicians returned to the top flight after five years, his third promotion. In July 2014 the 35-year-old retired from the game, and was immediately appointed director of football at his last club.

== Honours ==
Xerez

- Segunda División: 2008–09

Individual

- Segunda División top scorer: 2004–05
