= Júlio Baptista =

Brazilian footballer

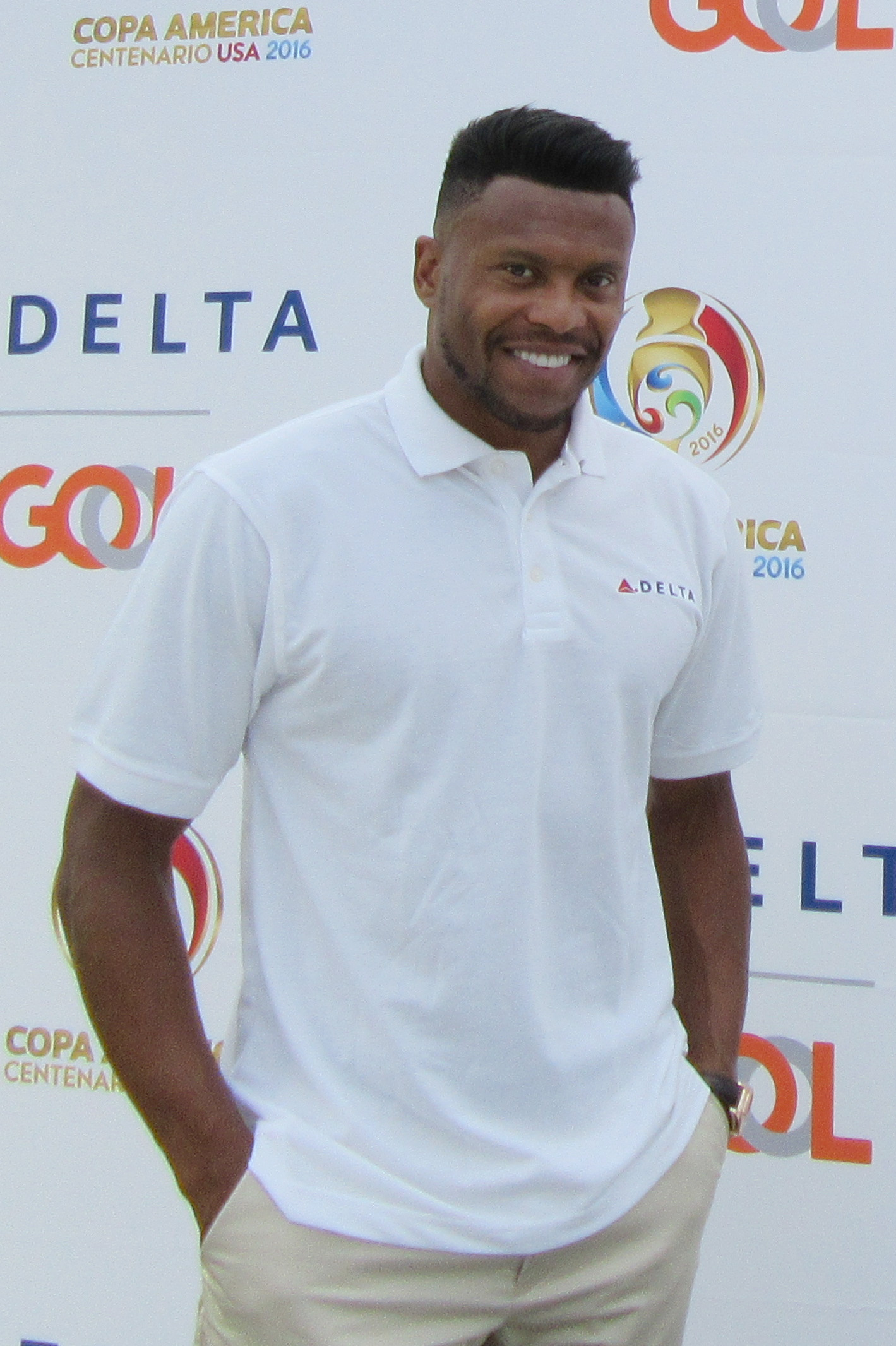
- Baptista in 2016

Personal information
- Full name: Júlio César Clemente Pereira Baptista
- Date of birth: 1 October 1981 (age 45)
- Place of birth: São Paulo, Brazil
- Height: 1.86 m (6 ft 1 in)
- Positions: Attacking midfielder; forward

Team information
- Current team: São Paulo U20 (head coach)

Youth career
- São Paulo

Senior career*
Years	Team	Apps	(Gls)
2000–2003	São Paulo	75	(10)
2003–2005	Sevilla	63	(38)
2005–2008	Real Madrid	59	(11)
2006–2007	→ Arsenal (loan)	24	(3)
2008–2011	Roma	57	(12)
2011–2013	Málaga	29	(14)
2013–2015	Cruzeiro	36	(12)
2016	Orlando City	23	(6)
2018–2019	CFR Cluj	2	(0)
Total		368	(106)

International career
2003	Brazil U23	5	(3)
2001–2010	Brazil	47	(5)

Managerial career
- 2019–2021: Valladolid (youth)
- 2021–2023: Valladolid B
- 2026–: São Paulo U20
Medal record
Representing Brazil
FIFA Confederations Cup
Winner	2005 Germany
Winner	2009 South Africa
Copa América
Winner	2004 Peru
Winner	2007 Venezuela
- * Club domestic league appearances and goals

Júlio César Clemente Pereira Baptista (born 1 October 1981) is a Brazilian football manager and former player who played as an attacking midfielder or a forward. He is nicknamed "The Beast" due to his size and physical presence on the football field.

Baptista began his career as a defensive midfielder, and after a series of impressive performances for his hometown squad São Paulo, Baptista signed for Sevilla in 2003. Upon signing for Sevilla, he was converted into a forward, and in his two seasons, he scored 50 goals, leading to his 2005 transfer to Spanish giants Real Madrid. After two unsuccessful seasons at Real Madrid with a loan spell at Arsenal sandwiched in between, Baptista transferred to Roma in Italy. In January 2011 he returned to Spain by signing for Málaga, and two years later went back to Brazil with Cruzeiro.

== Club career ==
=== Sevilla ===
On 3 August 2003, Sevilla FC unveiled Baptista as their newest signing. He cost the Spanish club £1.75 million (US$3.75 million). Baptista made it clear he was confident that he would succeed in Spain. He donned the No.19 jersey and began playing as an attacking midfielder. Baptista settled in quickly, scoring a double in Sevilla's 4–0 victory over Racing de Santander. As the season progressed, his good form continued, including a double against Levante UD and once more hitting the back of the net against Racing de Santander, this time with four goals as Sevilla picked up a 5–2 victory at home.

His form attracted the attention of several big clubs, but despite interest from English club Arsenal, Baptista remained at Sevilla for the following season, in which he once more showed his worth registering 25 goals in all competitions.

Between 2003 and 2005, Baptista made 81 appearances in all competitions for Sevilla and scored 50 goals in total. With this goal tally came a summer of transfer rumours in which Real Madrid battled it out with Arsenal for his signature.

=== Real Madrid ===
On 25 July 2005, Real Madrid confirmed the signing of the long-time Arsenal target for a fee of £13.8 million (€20 million), rising to £16.9 million (€24.5 million); Baptista signed a five-year deal. Baptista said he had chosen to remain in Spain at least one more year, as transferring to Real Madrid would allow him to gain dual citizenship (in Spain as well as Brazil), which would enable him to travel across Europe freely. He also explained he did not want to move to England at this time. Upon his arrival at Real Madrid, Baptista was awarded the No.8 jersey.

The season looked very promising for Real Madrid; the big-money signings of Robinho from Santos FC, Baptista, and Sergio Ramos from Sevilla meant that Real Madrid were tipped to end their trophy drought. It was not to be, however. At Real, Baptista was often played out of position as a left-winger to accommodate the likes of Zinedine Zidane and Guti in the Spanish side's attacking line-up. For this reason, he was unable to find the form that led many of Europe's top clubs to want to sign him. He managed to score just eight league goals throughout the 2006 league campaign. The season ended in disappointment as Real Madrid yet again ended the season without a trophy.

Baptista insisted that Arsenal were still in pursuit of him, but he made it clear he wanted to fulfill his contract with Real Madrid.

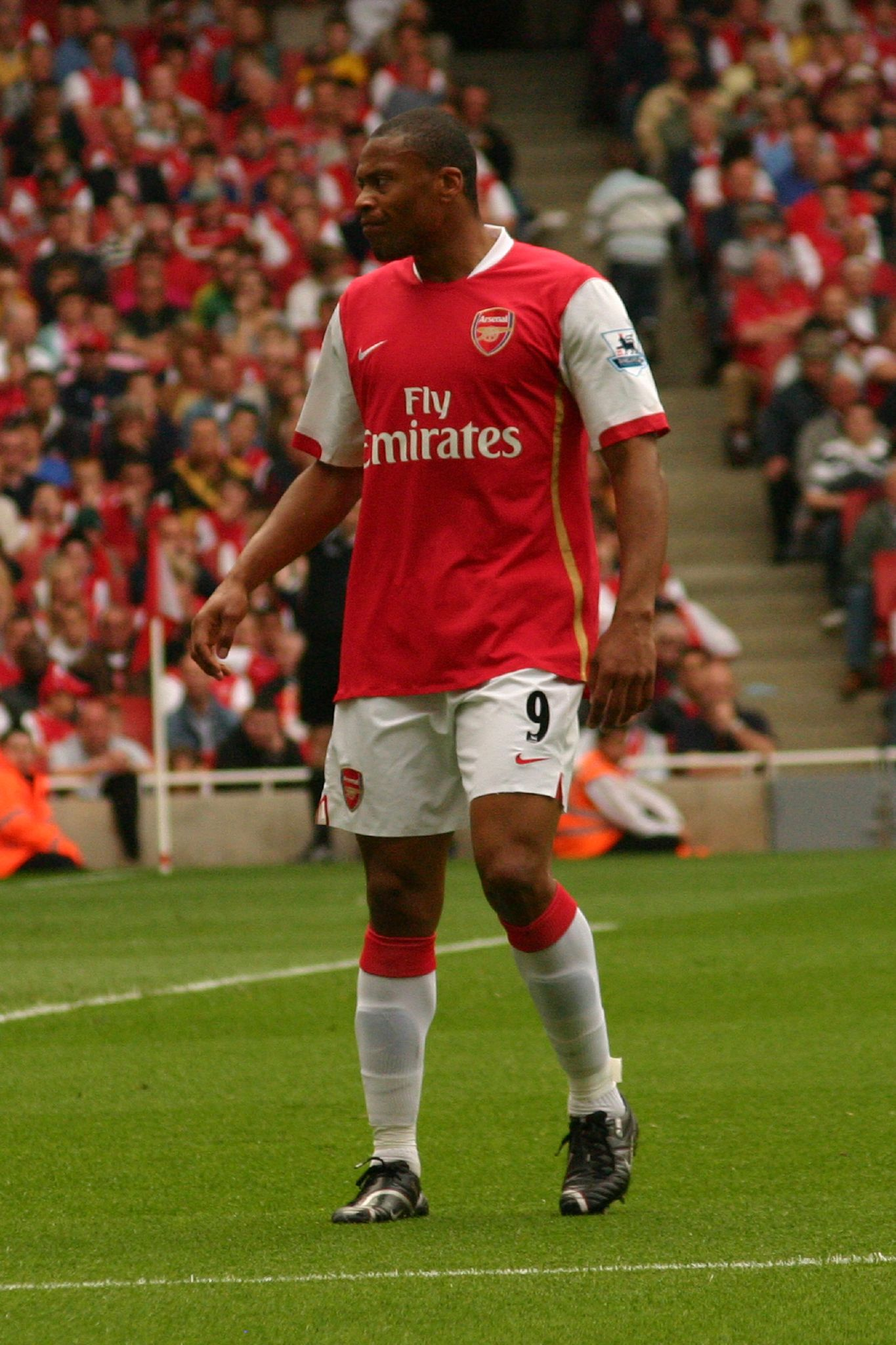
Baptista during his loan to Arsenal in 2007

At the end of August 2006, with the transfer window about to close, press reports linked him with a move to either Tottenham Hotspur or Arsenal. The latter was part of a possible swap deal that included José Antonio Reyes. Baptista went on to strenuously claim that he was not interested in a move away from Real Madrid. However, on 31 August 2006, the day of the transfer deadline, Baptista moved to Arsenal in exchange for Reyes. The deal saw both players signing on to 12-month loans at their new clubs. He scored his first goal for Arsenal against Hamburg in the Champions League on 21 November 2006.

Baptista struggled to score in the Premier League, managing just three goals in 24 league matches. Baptista, however, found scoring form in the League Cup, with six goals in the competition, including a club record four goals in Arsenal's quarter-final victory against Liverpool on 9 January 2007, in a 6–3 win for Arsenal; beside his 4 goals, he also missed a penalty kick in that game, and missed two other penalties that season against Bolton Wanderers and Portsmouth. Baptista also scored twice in Arsenal's semi-final against Tottenham Hotspur (having also scored an own goal at the other end), but they lost 2–1 to Chelsea in the final.

In total, Baptista scored 10 goals in 35 appearances for Arsenal.

At the end of the 2006–07 season, he was no longer required by Arsenal and returned to Real Madrid, as the loan deal finished. After the appointment of Bernd Schuster as head coach of Madrid, Baptista played far more often and in his preferred central position.

Baptista went on to score first in a 3–0 victory that knocked Lazio out of the Champions League. He then netted a magnificent first half goal from a one-two pass from Ruud van Nistelrooy against rivals Barcelona in the El Clásico. Baptista's goal proved to be vital in a game that eventually finished 1–0 to the visitors. This was only the second time Real Madrid had beaten rivals Barcelona in the league at the Camp Nou in 24 years.

During the season, Baptista continued his good form. This led to many praising his good performances as he continued to keep Guti on the bench. Real eventually won that season's La Liga title with Baptista thus earning a winner's medal.

=== Roma ===
Roma ended their search for another forward on 14 August, when they signed Baptista from Real Madrid. The Serie A club said in a statement that the 26-year-old had cost an initial €9 million plus bonuses and had penned a four-year deal worth €4.5million before tax and excluding bonuses.

Baptista made his debut for Roma in the Supercoppa Italiana on 24 August 2008, but the team lost to Inter Milan on penalties. Baptista converted his penalty kick. On 1 October 2008, he scored his first Champions League goals for the club, scoring a double against Bordeaux to give his side a 3–1 victory. Baptista scored Roma's winning goal in his first Rome derby against Lazio.

In the Champions League, Roma drew Baptista's former club, Arsenal. He played in both games, the first at the Emirates Stadium, a ground he used to call home, and the return leg at the Stadio Olimpico. In the return leg, Baptista came on as an early substitute, following the early injury to Roma's goalscorer Juan. Baptista had a couple of chances to give Roma the two goal advantage that would have sent them through to the quarter-final stage of the Champions League, most notably a chance in the 79th minute, where he missed from 10 yards out with just Manuel Almunia to beat. Roma lost 7–6 in the ensuing penalty shootout.

=== Málaga ===
On 3 January 2011, Málaga CF announced the signing of Júlio Baptista. He signed a two-and-a-half-year contract. On 14 January 2011, Roma announced that the transfer fee was €2.5 million. He made his debut for Málaga on 16 January 2011 in a 4–1 defeat at Barcelona, and six days later he scored his first goal in a 4–3 defeat at Valencia CF.

Baptista, however, was injured during the match between Málaga and Getafe CF (and scoring from penalty in a 2–2 draw) and was operated in Brazil couple of days later. He returned to action on 16 April 2011 by scoring twice in a 3–0 home win over RCD Mallorca, taking the team out of the relegation zone.

On 1 October 2011, Baptista scored a dramatic late winner in a 3–2 win over Getafe with an overhead kick, on his 30th birthday. However, he injured his right leg during the match, and though it was at first thought to be a minor injury he ultimately needed an operation that would keep him out of action for the rest of the year. On 6 March 2012 it was announced that Baptista might miss the rest of the season and would travel to Brazil to recover from his injury. He made his comeback on 3 February 2013, coming on as a substitute in a 1–1 draw against Real Zaragoza. Baptista scored his first goal since his return from injury on 30 March, netting the winner in Malaga's 3–1 defeat of Rayo Vallecano, a result that pushed the side into fourth place in La Liga.

On 24 July 2013, Málaga CF terminated his contract with the La Liga club.

=== Cruzeiro ===
On 24 July 2013, Júlio Baptista signed with the Brazilian first division club Cruzeiro Esporte Clube, where he was teamed up with well-known names such as Dedé, Dagoberto, and Fábio. He was reported to be on a two-year contract, with a reportedly €170,000 per month salary.

On 28 July 2013, Baptista went to the Mineirão Stadium in an armored car, and was presented to Celeste fans in the club's 4–1 victory against rivals Atlético Mineiro. After his presentation, Baptista did not confirm when he could debut for his new club. According to La Bestia, it depended on "documentation and of Marcelo Oliveira (Cruzeiro's coach)".

Manager Marcelo Oliveira praised Baptista for working to return to his best shape. Asked in which position Oliveira would play Baptista, he affirmed that Baptista would play as a playmaker, because he played in this position for Sevilla, in his best days. Oliveira also said he wanted Ricardo Goulart instead of Baptista to mark players.

=== Orlando City ===
On 23 March 2016, Orlando City SC announced that they had signed Baptista. He made his Major League Soccer debut on 8 April as a sub against Philadelphia Union, and scored his first goal in the league on 29 May against New York City FC. His contract option was declined by the club on 23 November 2016, making him a free agent.

=== CFR Cluj ===
On 18 August 2018, Baptista penned a deal for an undisclosed period with Romanian defending champions CFR Cluj. Eight days later, he made his debut in a goalless Liga I draw at Gaz Metan Mediaș, replacing Alexandru Ioniță in the 70th minute.

Baptista became subject of controversy in Romania, having played only 43 minutes for CFR in 2018, which made him one of the best paid football players per minute played.

He announced his retirement on 23 May 2019.

== International career ==
Baptista has 47 caps with Brazil and has netted five goals. His first cap came on 4 June 2001 in the 2001 FIFA Confederations Cup, a 0–0 draw against Japan. He also played a limited part in the 2005 edition of the competition.

As Baptista often played out of position at Real Madrid, his form dipped, and he was not included on the 2006 World Cup roster. However, Baptista was re-called to the Brazil squad for the 2007 Copa América and scored the opening goal in Brazil's 3–0 victory over Argentina in the final on 15 July 2007. Baptista ended the competition with three goals. He went on to play the 2010 World Cup for Brazil under coach Dunga.

== Coaching career ==
On 27 June 2019, Baptista was named manager of the Juvenil squad of Real Valladolid, owned by former Real Madrid teammate Ronaldo. On 8 July 2021, he took over the club's reserve team after Javier Baraja left.

== Career statistics ==
=== Club ===
As of 16 July 2013

Appearances and goals by club, season and competition
Club	Season	League			Cup (Note: Includes Copa do Brasil, Copa del Rey, FA Cup and Coppa Italia)		League Cup (Note: Includes Copa de la Liga and Football League Cup)		Continental		Total	
Club	Season	Division	Apps	Goals	Apps	Goals	Apps	Goals	Apps	Goals	Apps	Goals
São Paulo	2000	Série A	14	0	-		—		5	1	19	1
São Paulo	2001	Série A	25	4	5	4	—		6	1	36	9
São Paulo	2002	Série A	21	3	5	0	—		-		26	3
São Paulo	2003	Série A	15	3	7	2	—		-		22	5
São Paulo	Total		75	10	17	6	0	0	11	2	103	18
Sevilla	2003–04	La Liga	30	20	6	4	—		-		36	24
Sevilla	2004–05	La Liga	33	18	2	0	—		8	5	43	23
Sevilla	Total		63	38	8	4	0	0	8	5	79	47
Real Madrid	2005–06	La Liga	32	8	6	1	—		7	0	45	9
Real Madrid	2006–07	La Liga	0	0	0	0	—		0	0	0	0
Real Madrid	2007–08	La Liga	27	3	1	0	—		3	1	31	4
Real Madrid	Total		59	11	7	1	0	0	10	1	76	13
Arsenal (loan)	2006–07	Premier League	24	3	4	0	3	6	4	1	35	10
Roma	2008–09	Serie A	27	9	2	0	—		7	2	36	11
Roma	2009–10	Serie A	23	3	2	1	—		0	0	25	4
Roma	2010–11	Serie A	7	0	0	0	—		1	0	8	0
Roma	Total		57	12	4	1	0	0	8	2	69	15
Málaga	2010–11	La Liga	11	9	0	0	—		0	0	11	9
Málaga	2011–12	La Liga	4	1	0	0	0	0	0	0	4	1
Málaga	2012–13	La Liga	14	4	0	0	0	0	4	0	18	4
Málaga	Total		29	14	0	0	0	0	4	0	33	14
Career total			307	88	40	12	3	6	45	11	395	117

=== International ===
Updated 2 July 2010.

National team	Season	Apps	Goals
Brazil	2001	2	0
Brazil	2002	0	0
Brazil	2003	5	0
Brazil	2003–2004	6	0
Brazil	2004–2005	4	0
Brazil	2005–2006	2	0
Brazil	2006–2007	8	3
Brazil	2007–2008	9	0
Brazil	2008–2009	5	1
Brazil	2009–2010	6	1
Total		47	5

International goals

Scores and results table. Brazil's goal tally first:

#	Date	Venue	Opponent	Score	Result	Competition
1	7 July 2007	Estadio Olímpico Luis Ramos, Puerto la Cruz, Venezuela	Chile	2–0	6–1	2007 Copa América
2	10 July 2007	Estadio José Pachencho Romero, Maracaibo, Venezuela	Uruguay	2–1	2–2 (aet), 5–4 (pen.)	2007 Copa América
3	15 July 2007	Estadio José Pachencho Romero, Maracaibo, Venezuela	Argentina	1–0	3–0	2007 Copa América
4	28 March 2009	Estadio Olímpico Atahualpa, Quito, Ecuador	Ecuador	1–0	1–1	2010 FIFA World Cup qualification
5	9 September 2009	Estádio de Pituaçu, Salvador, Brazil	Chile	2–0	4–2	2010 FIFA World Cup qualification

== Honours ==
São Paulo

- Campeonato Paulista: 2000
- Torneio Rio – São Paulo: 2001

Arsenal

- Football League Cup runner-up: 2006–07

Real Madrid

- La Liga: 2007–08

Cruzeiro

- Campeonato Brasileiro Série A: 2013, 2014
- Campeonato Mineiro: 2014

CFR Cluj

- Liga I: 2018–19

Brazil Youth

- South American U-20 Championship: 2001

Brazil

- Copa América: 2004, 2007
- FIFA Confederations Cup: 2005, 2009

Individual

- La Liga Breakthrough Player of the Year: 2004
- Copa América Team of the Tournament: 2007
