= Jorge Luque =

Spanish footballer

Personal information
- Full name: Jorge Luque García
- Date of birth: 8 March 1981 (age 45)
- Place of birth: Córdoba, Spain
- Height: 1.75 m (5 ft 9 in)
- Position: Midfielder

Youth career
- Séneca
- 1996–2000: Sevilla

Senior career*
| Years | Team | Apps | (Gls) |
| 2000–2002 | Sevilla B | 18 | (0) |
| 2002–2003 | Mérida | 33 | (2) |
| 2003–2006 | Alicante | 101 | (6) |
| 2006–2009 | Xerez | 65 | (5) |
| 2009–2011 | Córdoba | 65 | (4) |
| 2011–2012 | Elche | 23 | (0) |
| 2013–2014 | Cádiz | 47 | (2) |
| 2014–2016 | Cartagena | 62 | (2) |
| Total | | 414 | (21) |
- * Club domestic league appearances and goals

Jorge Luque García (born 8 March 1981) is a Spanish former footballer who played as a midfielder.

== Club career ==
Luque was born in Córdoba, Andalusia. During his career, spent in Segunda División or lower, he played for Sevilla Atlético, Mérida UD, Alicante CF, Xerez CD, Córdoba CF, Elche CF, Cádiz CF and FC Cartagena; he appeared in 153 matches over six seasons in that level, scoring nine goals.

With Andalusia's Xerez, Luque appeared in 13 games (five starts, one goal) as the club achieved a first-ever promotion to La Liga in 2009, but never competed in that tier.
