= Ramón Sánchez-Pizjuán =

Spanish lawyer

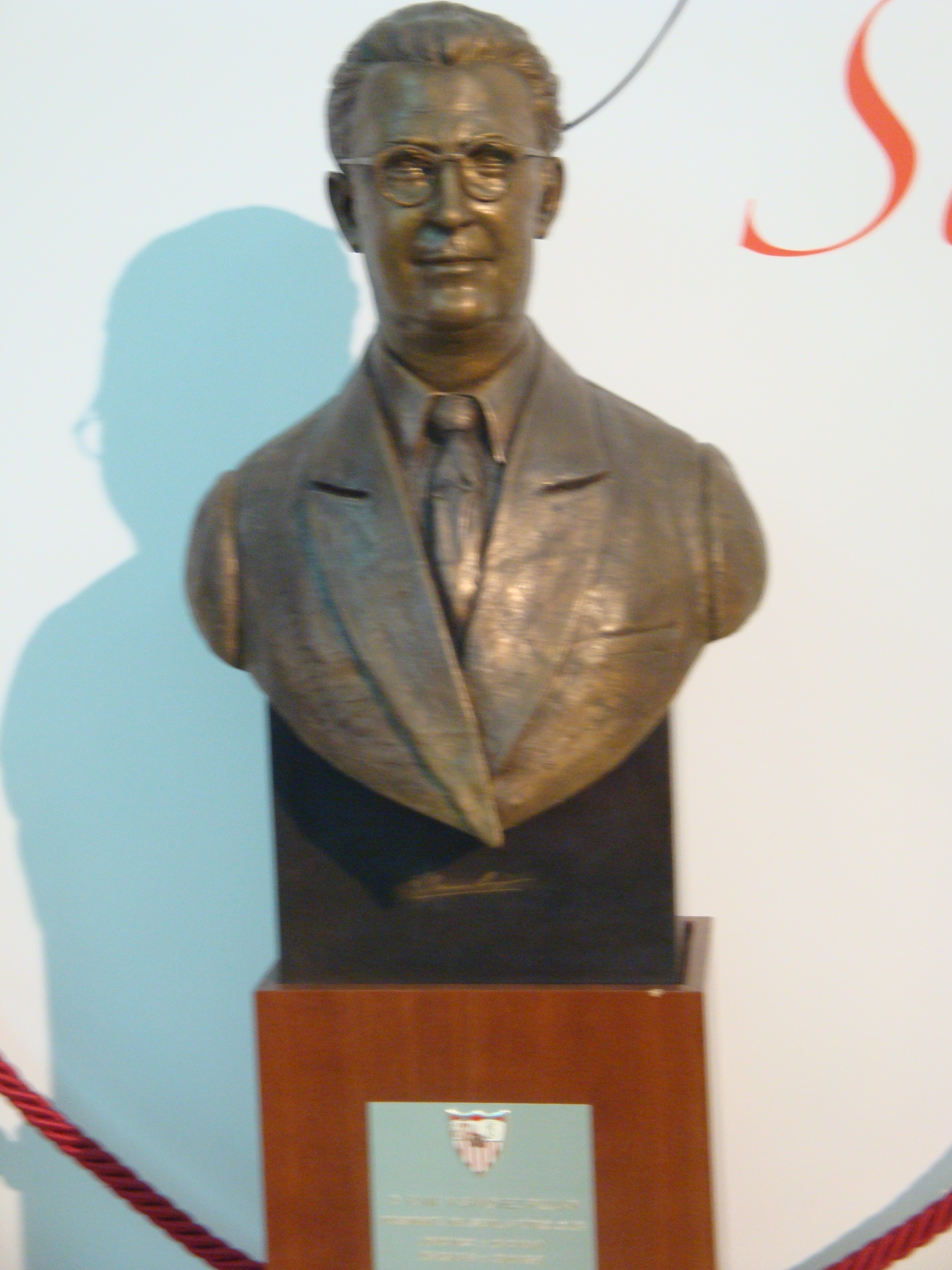

Ramón Sánchez–Pizjuán Muñoz (21 December 1900 – 28 October 1956) was a Spanish lawyer. He was the president of Sevilla FC from 1932 to 1941, and again from 1948 to 1956. Under his presidency, the club reached La Liga and won the national cup twice, while the land was bought for the Ramón Sánchez-Pizjuán Stadium.

== Biography ==
Born in Seville, he played football as a goalkeeper for Sevilla FC, rising no higher than the club's second team in 1917–18. He then pursued his legal career, before becoming the club's secretary in 1923 and president nine years later.

In 1933–34, Sevilla won the Segunda División to enter La Liga for the first time, before winning the Copa del Rey in 1935 and 1939. Due to the political upheaval at the time, the tournaments were titled the Copa del Presidente de la República and Copa del Generalísimo, respectively. In 1937, he purchased land by the club's Estadio de Nervión to build a larger stadium; around the same time, he negotiated for his players to not be conscripted to the Nationalists of the Spanish Civil War, who were then occupying the city. Players of his club and Seville derby rivals Real Betis were placed in an anti-aircraft unit far from action.

In 1941, the totalitarian new regime ousted him from his Sevilla presidency to bring in an ideological ally, while giving him a new job as vice president of the Royal Spanish Football Federation. Seven years later, he was voted back in by club members. Following his sudden death in 1956, his successor Ramón de Carranza pledged to complete Sánchez-Pizjuán's planned stadium, which was finished in 1958 and has borne his name ever since.

He has since been honoured by the club on anniversaries of his death, as the "Eternal President".
