= Francis (footballer, born 1981) =

Spanish footballer

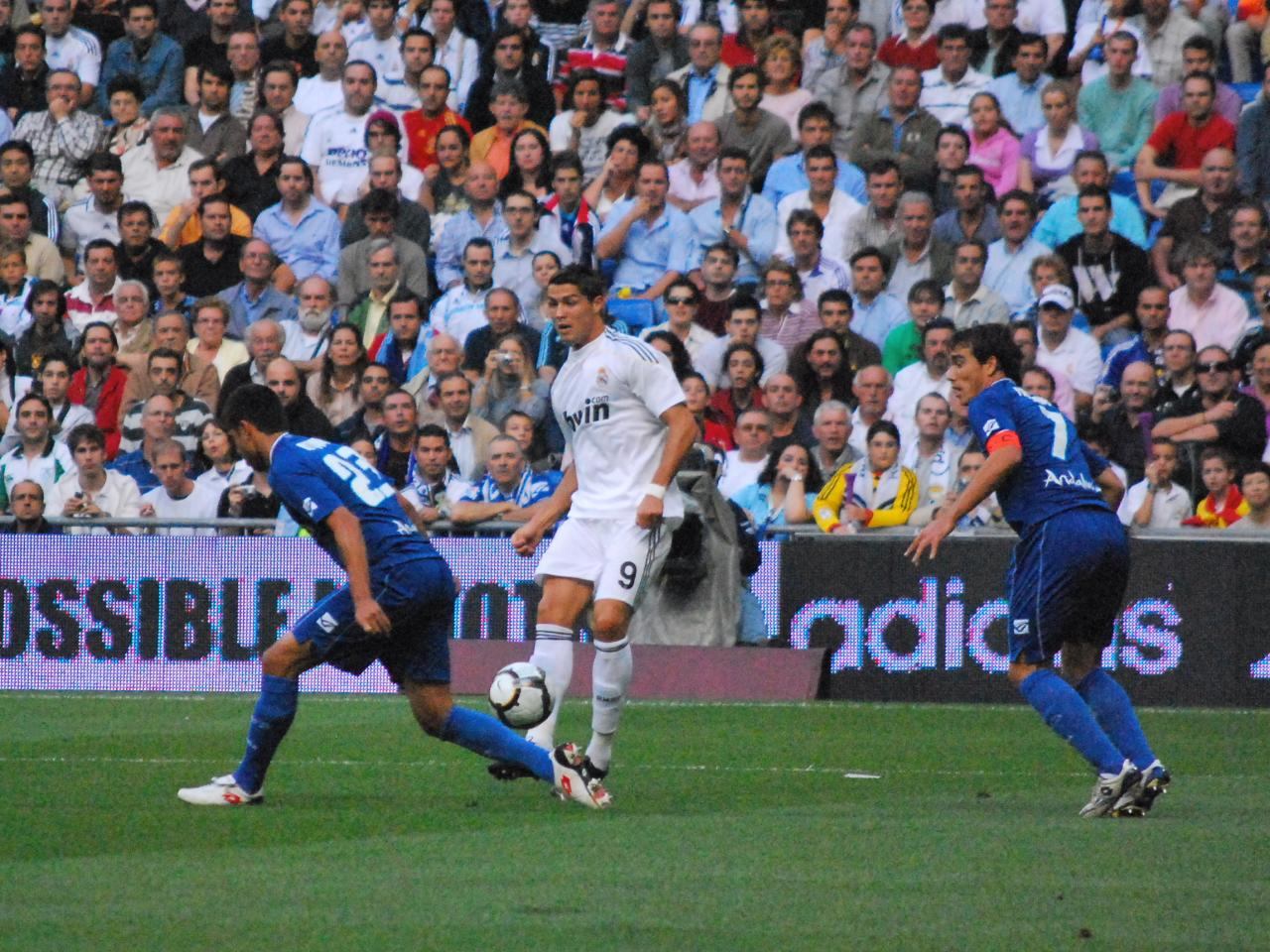
- Francis (right) with Xerez in 2009

Personal information
- Full name: Francisco Jesús Pérez Malia
- Date of birth: 17 December 1981 (age 44)
- Place of birth: Barbate, Spain
- Height: 1.80 m (5 ft 11 in)
- Positions: Right-back; midfielder

Youth career
- Barbate
- Xerez

Senior career*
| Years | Team | Apps | (Gls) |
| 1999–2010 | Xerez | 212 | (2) |
| 2000 | → Getafe (loan) | 2 | (0) |
| 2001–2002 | → San Fernando (loan) | 36 | (3) |
| 2002–2003 | → Écija (loan) | 31 | (4) |
| 2010–2016 | Racing Santander | 144 | (0) |
| Total | | 425 | (9) |

Managerial career
- 2019–2022: Xerez Deportivo B
- 2022–2023: Xerez Deportivo
- * Club domestic league appearances and goals

Francisco Jesús Pérez Malia (born 17 December 1981), commonly known as Francis, is a Spanish former professional footballer who played mainly as a right-back, currently a manager.

During his 17-year senior career, he played mainly with Xerez and Racing de Santander, appearing in 222 competitive games with the former. He amassed Segunda División totals of 219 matches and one goal over nine seasons, and competed in La Liga with both clubs.

== Club career ==
Born in Barbate, Province of Cádiz, Francis began his senior career with local Xerez CD. After two consecutive loans with Segunda División B clubs, including Getafe CF, he returned to his alma mater and made his professional debut in 2003–04's Segunda División, scoring once in 26 games. He went on to become an important first-team member, with the Andalusians achieving a first-ever La Liga promotion in the 2008–09 season.

Francis spent most of the short-lived top-flight campaign as a right-back. On 8 May 2010, as Xerez still harboured chances of staying up, he netted his only goal of the season, in a 3–2 home win against Real Zaragoza. Later that month, his contract expired and he signed a four-year deal with Racing de Santander.
