= Sidi Yaya Keita =

Malian footballer

Sidi Keita
Personal information
- Full name: Sidi Yaya Keita
- Date of birth: 20 March 1985 (age 41)
- Place of birth: Bamako, Mali
- Height: 1.77 m (5 ft 10 in)
- Position: Defensive midfielder

Youth career
- Djoliba

Senior career*
Years	Team	Apps	(Gls)
2003–2006	Strasbourg	27	(0)
2006–2011	Lens	63	(1)
2009–2010	→ Xerez (loan)	24	(0)
2012–2013	Xerez	23	(0)
Total		137	(1)

International career
2005–2010	Mali	9	(2)
- * Club domestic league appearances and goals

Sidi Yaya Keita (born 20 March 1985) is a Malian former professional footballer who played as a defensive midfielder.

== Club career ==
Born in Bamako, Keita moved to France at 18, signing for RC Strasbourg and spending his first year with the reserves, proceeding to be relatively used by the first team in the following two Ligue 1 seasons. He made his debut in the competition on 16 October 2004, playing 90 minutes in a 2–2 away draw against AC Ajaccio. While at Strasbourg Keita played as they won the 2005 Coupe de la Ligue Final.

Keita joined fellow league side RC Lens in the 2006–07 season, for €4.5m, as a replacement for Alou Diarra who joined Olympique Lyonnais. On 25 August 2007, he scored his first goal as a professional, in a 2–1 loss at former club Strasbourg, but the campaign eventually ended in relegation.

On 31 August 2009, Keita was loaned to Xerez CD in Spain, as the Andalusians were having their first La Liga experience. He made his first appearance on 27 September in a 0–0 away draw against RCD Espanyol, and quickly won the battle for first-choice holding midfielder over legendary club player Vicente Moreno, but they eventually dropped down a division.

After only eight league matches with Lens in 2010–11, with the club again being relegated, Keita was released by Les Sang et Or.

== International career ==
Keita made his debut for the Mali national team on 3 September 2005, against the Democratic Republic of Congo. On 11 October 2008, he scored twice in a 2–1 home win against Chad for the 2010 FIFA World Cup qualifiers.

== Personal life ==
Keita's cousin, Seydou Keita, was also a footballer and a midfielder. He too represented Lens and, with great individual and team success, also played for FC Barcelona.

He was the nephew of Salif Keita, who played for, amongst others, AS Saint-Étienne and Valencia CF.

== Honours ==
Strasbourg

- Coupe de la Ligue: 2004–05

Lens

- Ligue 2: 2008–09
- Coupe de la Ligue: runner-up 2007–08
