= David Prieto =

Spanish professional footballer (born 1983)

Personal information
- Full name: David Prieto Gálvez
- Date of birth: 2 January 1983 (age 43)
- Place of birth: Seville, Spain
- Height: 1.85 m (6 ft 1 in)
- Position: Centre-back

Youth career
- Sevilla

Senior career*
Years	Team	Apps	(Gls)
2002–2008	Sevilla B	121	(5)
2002–2003	→ Jerez (loan)	28	(1)
2005–2011	Sevilla	30	(0)
2006–2007	→ Xerez (loan)	39	(1)
2009–2010	→ Xerez (loan)	21	(0)
2010–2011	→ Tenerife (loan)	20	(0)
2011–2012	Córdoba	22	(1)
2012–2013	Xerez	26	(3)
2014	Lugo	4	(0)
2014–2015	Murcia	31	(1)
2015–2017	Atlético Baleares	55	(1)
2017–2019	Mirandés	35	(2)
2019–2020	Fuenlabrada	34	(1)
Total		466	(16)
- * Club domestic league appearances and goals

David Prieto Gálvez (born 2 January 1983) is a Spanish former professional footballer who played as a central defender.

Brought up at Sevilla, he also represented Xerez in La Liga, totalling 51 top-flight appearances. He played 163 Segunda División matches for seven clubs, as well as 252 games in the Segunda División B at both ends of his career.

== Club career ==
=== Sevilla ===
Born in Seville, Andalusia, Prieto was a product of Sevilla FC's youth system, and made his first-team debut on 6 February 2005, playing the full 90 minutes in a 3–0 away win against Levante UD. Appearing in four La Liga games that season and adding another four the following, he would alternate between the first and the second teams in the next years.

In the 2006–07 campaign, as Sevilla Atlético reached Segunda División for the first time ever, Prieto served a loan in another team from Andalusia and that level, Xerez CD. The following season, he appeared in eight league matches with the main squad and started in seven of those, due to the absences of Javi Navarro (knee, entire season missed) and Julien Escudé (pubis, less than half of possible games), as the team finished fifth and qualified for the UEFA Cup.

After the death of Antonio Puerta in the fall of 2007, Sevilla wanted to retire the player's number 16 shirt. Due to the Spanish League's strict rules on squad registration a retirement was impossible, and Puerta's shirt number was handed to Prieto, something he took great pride in.

On 18 August 2009, after having made 13 appearances in 2008–09, Prieto was once again loaned to recently promoted Xerez in a season-long move, without any buying option at the end. He contributed relatively as the club was immediately relegated, and moved in August 2010 to CD Tenerife – also dropped from the top flight – in the same situation.

=== Later career ===
In July 2011, Prieto left Sevilla, signing for one year at neighbours Córdoba CF in division two. He was sent off twice during the season, including a sixth-minute red card on 14 January in a 2–1 loss at Real Murcia CF for fouling Cristian García in the penalty box.

At the end of his contract in Córdoba, Prieto returned to Xerez on a two-year deal with the option of a third in July 2012. The following 14 April, he received his marching orders late on in a 2–1 away defeat to Elche CF and kicked a dugout, breaking it; the campaign ended with relegation again.

In February 2014, Prieto joined CD Lugo on a free transfer to replace the late departure of Miguel Ángel Tena to Cádiz CF. Seven months later, he dropped back to the third tier for the first time since his Sevilla reserve days, at Murcia.

Having reached the play-offs in his one season at the Estadio Nueva Condomina, Prieto joined Atlético Baleares in July 2015. He signed a one-year deal with the club from Palma de Mallorca but stayed for two, qualifying for the post-season again in 2017 and scoring a late own goal in the second round against Albacete Balompié 11 June which qualified the opposition 3–2 on aggregate.

Remaining in the third division, Prieto signed to CD Mirandés for one year in July 2017. The team won their group before losing in the play-off semi-finals to Extremadura UD, and in February 2019 he moved to CF Fuenlabrada a month after severing his link.

After playing 12 games to help the Madrid outskirts side gain their first ever promotion to the second division, 36-year-old Prieto was given a new one-year contract in July. Three months later, he suffered a fractured jaw in a collision with the elbow of Sporting de Gijón's Nacho Méndez, sidelining him for at least a month.
