= Leandro Gioda =

Argentine footballer (born 1984)

Personal information
- Full name: Leandro Andrés Gioda
- Date of birth: 1 October 1984 (age 42)
- Place of birth: Pérez, Argentina
- Height: 1.92 m (6 ft 4 in)
- Position: Centre back

Senior career*
| Years | Team | Apps | (Gls) |
| 2004–2006 | Lanús | 91 | (12) |
| 2006–2012 | Independiente | 75 | (3) |
| 2009–2010 | → Xerez CD (loan) | 29 | (2) |
| 2010 | → Quilmes (loan) | 9 | (0) |
| 2011 | → Xerez (loan) | 20 | (1) |
| 2012–2017 | Douglas Haig | 188 | (18) |
| 2017–2018 | Nueva Chicago | 4 | (0) |
- * Club domestic league appearances and goals as of 6 February 2018

Leandro Andrés Gioda (born 1 October 1984) is a retired Argentine footballer, he last played for Nueva Chicago. His position is centre back.

== Career ==
Gioda started his career in 2004 at Lanús and was signed by Independiente in 2006. Gioda had unfortunate luck with injuries while at Independiente suffering two serious knee injuries. On 2 August 2009 Xerez CD signed the Argentine defender on loan from Independiente for a season.

Gioda returned to Argentina joining newly promoted first division side Quilmes on loan for the 2010–11 season. He then returned to Spanish side Xerez for the second half of the 2010-2011 season.

He was signed in the 2012–13 season to Primera B Nacional side Douglas Haig.

After that he went to Argentinian team named Nueva Chicago in 2017–2018
