= Juan Redondo =

Spanish footballer

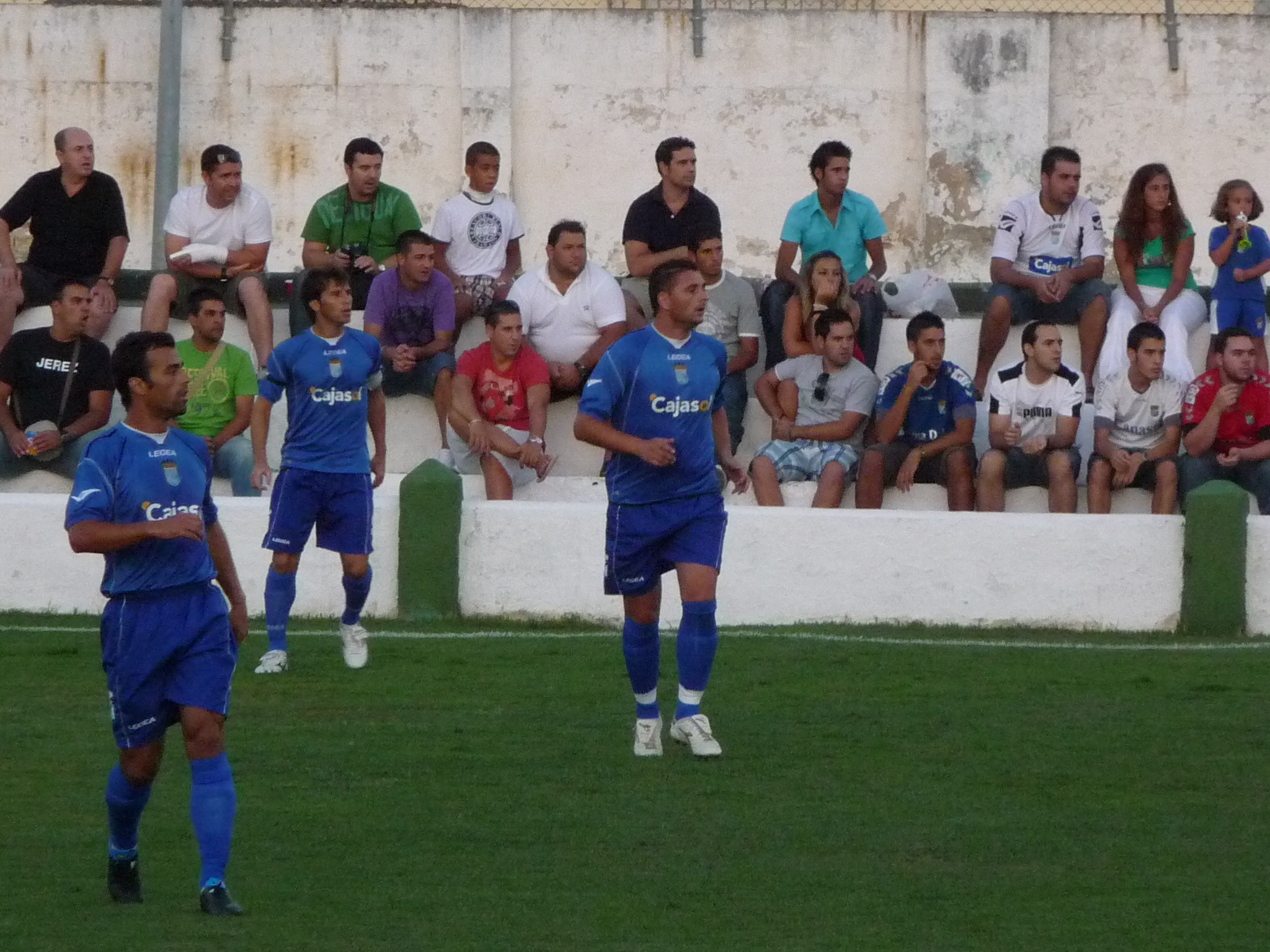
- Redondo (left) with Xerez in 2009

Personal information
- Full name: Juan Luis Fernández Redondo
- Date of birth: 17 January 1977 (age 49)
- Place of birth: Camas, Spain
- Height: 1.77 m (5 ft 9 1/2 in)
- Position: Right-back

Senior career*
Years	Team	Apps	(Gls)
1994–1997	Betis B	94	(12)
1997	Betis	2	(0)
1997–1998	Hércules	34	(1)
1998–1999	Logroñés	24	(2)
1999–2002	Elche	107	(3)
2002–2005	Sevilla	59	(0)
2005–2007	Hércules	51	(0)
2008–2011	Xerez	72	(0)
Total		443	(18)

International career
1992–1993	Spain U16	16	(0)
1993–1995	Spain U18	15	(0)
1995	Spain U19	2	(0)
1997	Spain U20	6	(0)
- * Club domestic league appearances and goals

Juan Luis Fernández Redondo (born 17 January 1977) is a Spanish former professional footballer who played as a right-back.

He amassed Segunda División totals of 275 matches and six goals over ten seasons, in representation of four clubs. In La Liga, he appeared for Betis, Sevilla and Xerez.

== Club career ==
Redondo was born in Camas, Seville, Andalusia. During his professional career, spent mainly in the Segunda División, he also had La Liga spells with both main clubs from Seville: he appeared in only three games late into the 1996–97 season with Real Betis, being regularly played by Sevilla FC in two of his three years but being released prior to their consecutive UEFA Cup exploits.

In January 2008, after a couple of second-tier campaigns with Hércules CF, the 31-year-old Redondo joined Xerez CD in the same league, where he would be used almost exclusively as a backup, only totalling 39 matches over three seasons, the last spent in the top flight with relegation. Subsequently, he renewed his contract for a further year.

In June 2011, after making 33 appearances – 31 starts – to help to an eighth-place finish, Redondo left Xerez and retired from football the following year, after not being able to find a team.

== Honours ==
Xerez

- Segunda División: 2008–09

Spain U18

- UEFA European Under-18 Championship: 1995
