= José Manuel Casado =

Spanish footballer (born 1986)

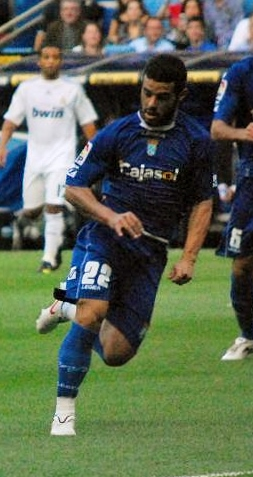
- Casado playing for Xerez

Personal information
- Full name: José Manuel Casado Bizcocho
- Date of birth: 9 August 1986 (age 40)
- Place of birth: Coria del Río, Spain
- Height: 1.73 m (5 ft 8 in)
- Position: Left-back

Youth career
- 1996–1998: Coria
- 1998–2001: Sevilla
- 2001–2004: Barcelona

Senior career*
Years	Team	Apps	(Gls)
2004–2006	Barcelona C	59	(0)
2006–2008	Sevilla B	68	(2)
2007–2010	Sevilla	2	(0)
2008–2009	→ Recreativo (loan)	19	(0)
2009–2010	→ Xerez (loan)	27	(0)
2010–2013	Rayo Vallecano	96	(1)
2013–2015	Málaga	2	(0)
2015	Almería	8	(0)
2015–2016	Bolton Wanderers	9	(0)
2017	Numancia	7	(0)
2017–2018	Recreativo	22	(0)
2019–2020	Coria	12	(1)
Total		331	(4)
- * Club domestic league appearances and goals

José Manuel Casado Bizcocho (born 9 August 1986) is a Spanish former professional footballer who played as a left-back.

== Club career ==
Casado was born in Coria del Río, Province of Seville. He started his youth career at Sevilla FC and finished it at FC Barcelona, only representing the Catalans' C team (soon to be extinct) and subsequently returning to his previous club, spending two seasons with reserves Sevilla Atlético in the Segunda División.

A defensive stalwart for the B's, Casado also appeared twice for the main squad during 2007–08, the first being on 11 November 2007 in a 3–2 away loss against Villarreal CF. In the following years, after the latter's relegation, two consecutive La Liga loans ensued, both in Andalusia: first with Recreativo de Huelva, where he played half of the season's matches, and newly promoted Xerez CD, where he was featured more but ultimately met the same fate, relegation.

Casado was definitely released by Sevilla in July 2010, signing a two-year deal with Rayo Vallecano. He was first choice in his debut campaign as the club returned to the top flight after an absence of eight years; he continued to start for the Madrilenians, collecting 29 yellow cards and two red over two seasons in the process.

On 29 September 2013, still recovering from a severe knee injury which prevented a move to Levante UD, Casado signed a 2+3 contract with fellow top-tier side Málaga CF. He made his competitive debut on 8 February of the following year, playing the second half of the 4–1 away defeat to former club Rayo.

Casado was transferred to UD Almería on 30 January 2015 after agreeing to an 18-month deal. On 8 June, after their relegation from the main division, he was released.

On 27 August 2015, Casado joined Championship side Bolton Wanderers on a free transfer, signing a one-year contract. In January 2016, he left by mutual agreement.

In late January 2017, after almost a year without a club, Casado moved to CD Numancia following a successful trial.
