= Antoñito =

Spanish footballer

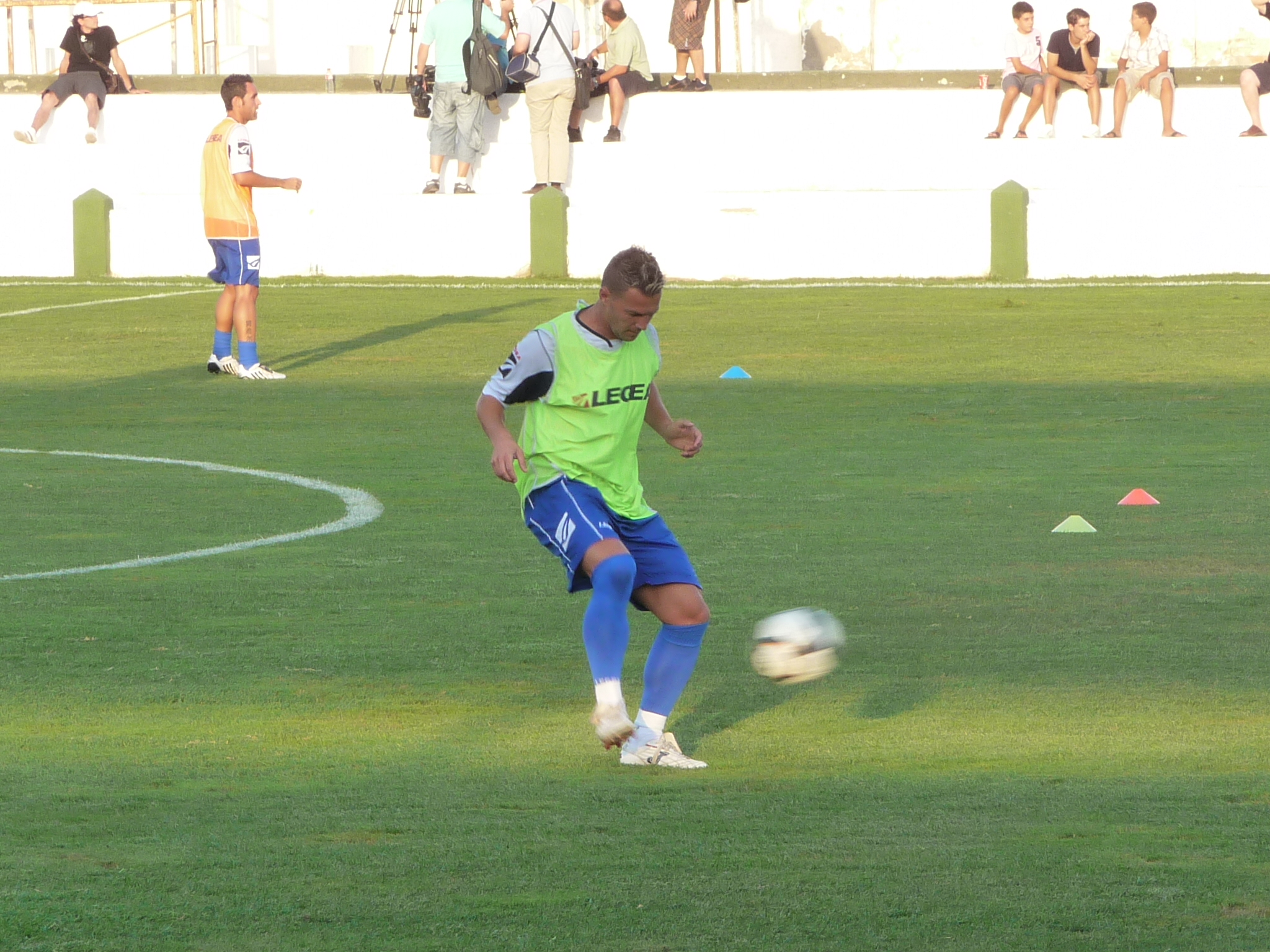
- Antoñito with Xerez in 2009

Personal information
- Full name: Antonio Ramiro Pérez
- Date of birth: 2 February 1978 (age 48)
- Place of birth: Seville, Spain
- Height: 1.78 m (5 ft 10 in)
- Position: Striker

Youth career
- 1995–1996: Alcosa
- 1996: Betis
- 1997: Cantillana

Senior career*
Years	Team	Apps	(Gls)
1997	San Pablo		
1998	Ibarburu		
1998–1999	Marchena		
1999–2000	Los Palacios		
2000–2002	Sevilla B	42	(35)
2001–2007	Sevilla	95	(14)
2002	→ Recreativo (loan)	18	(7)
2005–2006	→ Racing Santander (loan)	32	(9)
2006–2007	→ Murcia (loan)	34	(6)
2007–2011	Xerez	118	(25)
2011–2012	Atlético Baleares	33	(10)
2012–2013	San Fernando	25	(0)
Total		397+	(106+)
- * Club domestic league appearances and goals

Antonio Ramiro Pérez (born 2 February 1978), known as Antoñito, is a Spanish former professional footballer who played as a striker.

He played mainly for Sevilla and Xerez in a 16-year career, amassing La Liga totals of 147 matches and 26 goals over six seasons and adding 150 games and 35 goals in the Segunda División.

== Club career ==
Antoñito was born in the Seville neighborhood of El Polígono de San Pablo, where he was known as "El Romario del Polígono", and played only amateur football until the age of 22, signing for Sevilla FC in summer 2000 – after turning down an offer from Real Betis – and being assigned to the reserve team, scoring 40 goals in his first season to help them to promote to Segunda División B. He made his debut with the main squad also during 2000–01, in the Segunda División; after a loan to Andalusia neighbours Recreativo de Huelva in the same league, he returned to play an important attacking role (mainly as a substitute) on a side that achieved two consecutive sixth places in La Liga.

Antoñito made eight appearances for Sevilla in the 2004–05 UEFA Cup. He scored his only goal on 2 December 2004, in a 3–2 home win over AEK Athens F.C. in the group stage.

For 2005–06, Antoñito was again loaned, being instrumental in Racing de Santander's narrow escape from top-flight relegation. He totalled nine goals for the campaign, notably an 88th-minute winner against CA Osasuna on 7 May 2006.

Antoñito joined division two club Real Murcia CF on 7 July 2006 in another loan, helping it to achieve promotion. The following season he moved to Xerez CD in his native region, and extended his contract one more year late into 2008–09, being a very important unit in their first-ever promotion to the top tier.

In July 2011, after only six goals for Xerez over two seasons, including three in the 2009–10 campaign in an immediate relegation from the main division, the 33-year-old Antoñito signed for CD Atlético Baleares two leagues below.

== Honours ==
Sevilla B

- Tercera División: 2000–01

Sevilla

- Segunda División: 2000–01

Xerez

- Segunda División: 2008–09
