= 2009–10 Real Madrid CF season =

Real Madrid
2009–10 season
- President: Florentino Pérez
- Head coach: Manuel Pellegrini
- Stadium: Santiago Bernabéu
- La Liga: 2nd
- Copa del Rey: Round of 32
- UEFA Champions League: Round of 16
- Top goalscorer: League: Gonzalo Higuaín (27); All: Cristiano Ronaldo (33)
- Biggest win: Real Madrid 6–0 Real Zaragoza
- Biggest defeat: AD Alcorcón 4–0 Real Madrid
Home colours	Away colours	Third colours

The 2009–10 season was Real Madrid Club de Fútbol's 79th season in La Liga. This article shows player statistics and all matches (official and friendly) that the club played during the 2009–10 season.

The newly constructed Second Galácticos of President Pérez looked to reverse the misfortunes of past years. The 2009-10 season, however, despite it being the debut season of Cristiano Ronaldo, Karim Benzema, and Kaká was a transitional one as Madrid again finished second in the league, although this time amassing 96 points, the club's record at the time, and went out of the Champions League at the hands of Lyon. The season was marred by Ronaldo's injury, that sidelined him for seven weeks, although he still topped the goalscoring charts with 33 goals, and Madrid became the highest scoring team in La Liga, with 102 goals. Real Madrid also had the misfortune to become the runners-up with the highest points total in the history of Europe's top five leagues, until surpassed by Liverpool's 97 points in the 2018–19 Premier League.

== Club ==
=== Coaching staff ===
Position	Staff
Head coach	(Chile) Manuel Pellegrini
Assistant coach	(Argentina) Rubén Cousillas
Fitness coach	(Spain) José Cabello
Goalkeepers coach	(Spain) Pedro Luis Jaro

Source: Realmadrid.com and realmadridfans

=== Kit ===
Supplier: Adidas
Sponsor(s): bwin

Home	Domestic away	European away

Source: "The new shirt of Real Madrid 2009/10 unveiled". Real Madrid C.F. Archived from the original on 21 June 2009.
"Real Madrid's current kit". Adidas.com. Archived from the original on 18 June 2009.

=== Other information ===
President	(Spain) Florentino Pérez
Honorary Life President	(Argentina) (Spain) Alfredo Di Stéfano
1st Vice-president	(Spain) Fernando Fernández Tapias
2nd Vice-president	(Spain) Eduardo Fernández de Blas
Secretary of the Board	(Spain) Enrique Sánchez González
Director General	(Argentina) Jorge Valdano
Director General of the President's Office	(Spain) Manuel Redondo
Director of Institutional Relations	(Spain) Emilio Butragueño
Advisor to the President	(France) Zinedine Zidane
Sporting Director	(Spain) Miguel Pardeza
Director of the Social Area	(Spain) José Luis Sánchez
Director of the Legal Advisory Board	(Spain) Javier López Farre
Ground (capacity and dimensions)	Santiago Bernabéu (80,354 / 105x68m)
Training ground	Ciudad Real Madrid

Source: Board of Directors (Realmadrid), El club más laureado del mundo

== Players ==
=== Squad information ===
N	Pos.	Nat.	Name	Age	EU	Since	App	Goals	Ends	Transfer fee	Notes
1	GK	(Spain)	Iker Casillas (VC)	29	EU	1999	518	0	2017	Youth system	
2	RB	(Spain)	Álvaro Arbeloa	27	EU	2009	38	2	2014	€4.5M	
3	CB	(Portugal)	Pepe	27	EU	2007	68	1	2012	€30M	Second nationality: Brazil
4	RB	(Spain)	Sergio Ramos (VC)	24	EU	2005	211	28	2013	€28M	
5	DM	(Argentina)	Fernando Gago	24	EU	2007 (Winter)	114	1	2013	€20M	Second nationality: Italy
6	DM	(Mali)	Mahamadou Diarra	29	EU	2006	77	3	2011	€26M	
7	SS	(Spain)	Raúl (captain)	32	EU	1994	744	323	2011	Youth system	
8	AM	(Brazil)	Kaká	28	EU	2009	33	9	2015	€65M	Second nationality: Italy
9	RW	(Portugal)	Cristiano Ronaldo	25	EU	2009	35	33	2015	€94M	
10	DM	(France)	Lassana Diarra	25	EU	2009 (Winter)	63	1	2013	€20M	Second nationality: Mali
11	ST	(France)	Karim Benzema	21	EU	2009	33	9	2015	€35M	Second nationality: Algeria
12	LB	(Brazil)	Marcelo	22	EU	2007 (Winter)	113	8	2015	€6.5M	Second nationality: Spain
13	GK	(Poland)	Jerzy Dudek	37	EU	2007	10	0	2010	Free	
14	AM	(Spain)	Guti (VC)	33	EU	1995	535	77	2011	Youth system	
15	LW	(Netherlands)	Royston Drenthe	23	EU	2007	61	3	2012	€13M	
18	CB	(Spain)	Raúl Albiol	24	EU	2009	43	1	2014	€15M	
19	CB	(Argentina)	Ezequiel Garay	23	EU	2008	23	1	2014	€10M	Second nationality: Spain
20	ST	(Argentina)	Gonzalo Higuaín	22	EU	2007 (Winter)	139	64	2013	€13M	Second nationality: France
21	CB	(Germany)	Christoph Metzelder	29	EU	2007	31	1	2010	Free	
22	DM	(Spain)	Xabi Alonso	28	EU	2009	41	3	2014	€30M	
23	AM	(Netherlands)	Rafael van der Vaart	27	EU	2008	71	12	2013	€13M	
24	CM	(Spain)	Esteban Granero	22	EU	2009	36	3	2013	€4.5M	
26	GK	(Spain)	Antonio Adán	23	EU	2009	0	0	2014	Youth system	
28	LB	(Spain)	Marcos Alonso	19	EU	2010	1	0		Youth system	
30	MF	(Spain)	Pedro Mosquera	22	EU	2010	1	0		Youth system	
36	FW	(Spain)	Juanfran	21	EU	2010	1	0		Youth system	

- Last updated: 16 May 2010
- Source: Wikipedia players' articles, ESPN (for appearances and goals), realmadrid.com (for players' numbers) and soccer-spain.com, sportec.es (for EU passport)
- Ordered by position on pitch.

=== Players in / out ===
==== In ====
No.	Pos.	Nat.	Name	Age	EU	Moving from	Type	Transfer window	Ends	Transfer fee	Source
19	DF	(Argentina)	Ezequiel Garay	21	EU	Racing Santander	Loan Return	Summer	2013	Free	Realmadrid, realracingclub
2	DF	(Spain)	Álvaro Arbeloa	26	EU	Liverpool (England)	Transfer	Summer	2014	€4.5M	Realmadrid, liverpoolfc
8	MF	(Brazil)	Kaká	27	EU	Milan (Italy)	Transfer	Summer	2015	€67M	Realmadrid, AC Milan
9	FW	(Portugal)	Cristiano Ronaldo	24	EU	Manchester United (England)	Transfer	Summer	2015	€94M	Realmadrid, manutd
22	MF	(Spain)	Xabi Alonso	27	EU	Liverpool (England)	Transfer	Summer	2014	€35M + €5M in variables	Realmadrid, liverpoolfc, TheGuardian
17	FW	(Spain)	Álvaro Negredo	23	EU	Almería	Transfer	Summer	2013	€5M	Realmadrid
18	DF	(Spain)	Raúl Albiol	23	EU	Valencia	Transfer	Summer	2014	€15M	Realmadrid, valenciacf
11	FW	(France)	Karim Benzema	21	EU	Lyon (France)	Transfer	Summer	2015	€35M	Realmadrid, olweb.fr
24	MF	(Spain)	Esteban Granero	21	EU	Getafe	Transfer	Summer	2013	€4.5M	Realmadrid, LFP
26	GK	(Spain)	Antonio Adán	22	EU	Youth system	Promoted	Summer	2012	Youth system	Realmadrid

Total spending: ▼€261 million

==== Out ====
No.	Pos.	Nat.	Name	Age	EU	Moving to	Type	Transfer window	Transfer fee	Source
18	MF	(France)	Julien Faubert	25	EU	West Ham United (England)	Loan Return	Summer	n/a	Realmadrid, West Ham
5	DF	(Italy)	Fabio Cannavaro	35	EU	Juventus (Italy)	End of contract	Summer	Free	Realmadrid, Juventus
9	FW	(Argentina)	Javier Saviola	27	EU	Benfica (Portugal)	Transfer	Summer	€5M	Realmadrid, Benfica
18	MF	(Spain)	Rubén de la Red	24	EU		Retirement	Summer	n/a	Realmadrid
13	GK	(Spain)	Jordi Codina	27	EU	Getafe	Transfer	Summer	Free	Getafecf
24	DM	(Spain)	Javi García	22	EU	Benfica (Portugal)	Transfer	Summer	€7M	Realmadrid, Benfica
17	DM	(Spain)	Dani Parejo	20	EU	Getafe	Transfer	Summer	€3M	Realmadrid, Getafecf
16	LB	(Argentina)	Gabriel Heinze	31	EU	Marseille (France)	Transfer	Summer	€1.5M	Realmadrid, Marseille
2	RB	(Spain)	Míchel Salgado	33	EU	Blackburn Rovers (England)	Contract cancellation	Summer	Free	Realmadrid, Blackburn
19	FW	(Netherlands)	Klaas-Jan Huntelaar	25	EU	Milan (Italy)	Transfer	Summer	€15M	Realmadrid, AC Milan
17	FW	(Spain)	Álvaro Negredo	23	EU	Sevilla	Transfer	Summer	€15M	Realmadrid, Sevilla
10	MF	(Netherlands)	Wesley Sneijder	25	EU	Internazionale (Italy)	Transfer	Summer	€15M	Realmadrid, Inter
11	MF	(Netherlands)	Arjen Robben	25	EU	Bayern Munich (Germany)	Transfer	Summer	€25M	Realmadrid, FCBayern
22	LB	(Spain)	Miguel Torres	23	EU	Getafe	Transfer	Summer	€2M	Realmadrid, Getafecf
17	FW	(Netherlands)	Ruud van Nistelrooy	33	EU	Hamburger SV (Germany)	Transfer	Winter	Free	Realmadrid, Hamburger

Total income: ▲€88.5 million
Last updated: 23 January 2010

=== Squad stats ===
				Total				La Liga		UEFA Champions League		Copa del Rey		
N	Pos.	Name	Nat.	GS	App	Gls	Min	App	Gls	App	Gls	App	Gls	Notes
1	GK	Iker Casillas	(Spain)	46	46		4326	38		8				
2	RB	Álvaro Arbeloa	(Spain)	38	38	2	3473	30	2	6		2		
18	CB	Raúl Albiol	(Spain)	42	43	1	3914	33		8	1	2		
4	CB	Sergio Ramos	(Spain)	40	40	4	3661	33	4	7				
12	LB	Marcelo	(Brazil)	40	43	4	3690	35	4	6		2		
22	CM	Xabi Alonso	(Spain)	41	41	3	3638	34	3	7				
24	CM	Esteban Granero	(Spain)	25	35	3	2228	30	3	4		1		
8	AM	Kaká	(Brazil)	29	33	9	2588	25	8	7	1	1		
9	LW	Cristiano Ronaldo	(Portugal)	33	35	33	3040	29	26	6	7			
20	FW	Gonzalo Higuaín	(Argentina)	35	40	29	3046	32	27	7	2	1		
11	FW	Karim Benzema	(France)	18	33	9	1785	27	8	5	1	1		
13	GK	Jerzy Dudek	(Poland)	2	2		189					2		
26	GK	Antonio Adán	(Spain)											
15	LB	Royston Drenthe	(Netherlands)	5	11	1	523	8		2	1	1		
3	CB	Pepe	(Portugal)	17	17	1	1556	10	1	6		1		
19	CB	Ezequiel Garay	(Argentina)	20	23	1	1922	20	1	3				
21	CB	Christoph Metzelder	(Germany)	3	3		279	2				1		
6	DM	Mahamadou Diarra	(Mali)	7	20		767	15		3		2		
10	DM	Lassana Diarra	(France)	26	30	1	2378	23	1	6		1		
5	DM	Fernando Gago	(Argentina)	16	22		1493	18		2		2		
7	SS	Raúl	(Spain)	13	39	7	1623	30	5	7	2	2		
14	AM	Guti	(Spain)	13	30	3	1572	26	2	3	1	1		
23	AM	Rafael van der Vaart	(Netherlands)	18	31	7	1536	26	6	3		2	1	
28	LB	Marcos Alonso	(Spain)		1		2	1						
30	LM	Pedro Mosquera	(Spain)		1		5	1						
36	FW	Juanfran	(Spain)		1		9	1						

Last updated: 16 May 2010
Source: Match reports in competitive matches, LFP.com Soccernet.espn, sportec.es
Ordered by start team, game starts and position on pitch (from back right to front left)
0 shown as blank

=== Goals ===
R	Player	Position	League	Champions League	Copa del Rey	Total
1	(Portugal) Cristiano Ronaldo	WF	26	7	0	33
2	(Argentina) Gonzalo Higuaín	ST	27	2	0	29
3	(Brazil) Kaká	AM	8	1	0	9
3	(France) Karim Benzema	ST	8	1	0	9
5	(Netherlands) Rafael van der Vaart	AM	6	0	1	7
5	(Spain) Raúl	SS	5	2	0	7
7	(Brazil) Marcelo	LB	4	0	0	4
7	(Spain) Sergio Ramos	RB	4	0	0	4
9	(Spain) Guti	AM	2	1	0	3
9	(Spain) Esteban Granero	CM	3	0	0	3
9	(Spain) Xabi Alonso	CM	3	0	0	3
12	(Spain) Álvaro Arbeloa	RB	2	0	0	2
13	(Spain) Raúl Albiol	CB	0	1	0	1
13	(Argentina) Ezequiel Garay	CB	1	0	0	1
13	(France) Lassana Diarra	DM	1	0	0	1
13	(Portugal) Pepe	CB	1	0	0	1
13	(Netherlands) Ruud van Nistelrooy	ST	1	0	0	1
13	(Netherlands) Royston Drenthe	LB	0	1	0	1

=== Disciplinary record ===
N	Pos.	Nat.	Name	Yellow card	Second yellow card	Red card	Notes
9	FW	(Portugal)	Cristiano Ronaldo	5	1	1	
4	DF	(Spain)	Sergio Ramos	11	0	1	
18	CB	(Spain)	Raúl Albiol	8	0	1	
10	DM	(France)	Lassana Diarra	11	1	0	
22	CM	(Spain)	Xabi Alonso	15	0	0	
2	RB	(Spain)	Álvaro Arbeloa	12	0	0	
12	LB	(Brazil)	Marcelo	8	0	0	
14	AM	(Spain)	Guti	7	0	0	
19	CB	(Argentina)	Ezequiel Garay	6	0	0	
5	CM	(Argentina)	Fernando Gago	5	0	0	
8	AM	(Brazil)	Kaká	5	0	0	
20	ST	(Argentina)	Gonzalo Higuaín	4	0	0	
24	CM	(Spain)	Esteban Granero	4	0	0	
15	LB	(Netherlands)	Royston Drenthe	3	0	0	
23	AM	(Netherlands)	Rafael van der Vaart	3	0	0	
6	DM	(Mali)	Mahamadou Diarra	3	0	0	
3	CB	(Portugal)	Pepe	2	0	0	
7	SS	(Spain)	Raúl	2	0	0	
1	GK	(Spain)	Iker Casillas	2	0	0	

Last updated: 16 May 2010
Source: Competitive matches and LFP.com, sportec.es
Only competitive matches
(yellow card) = Number of bookings; (second yellow card) = Number of sending offs after a second yellow card; (red card) = Number of sending offs by a direct red card..

=== Overall ===
	Total	Home	Away
Games played	48	24	24
Games won	36	21	15
Games drawn	5	1	4
Games lost	7	2	5
Biggest win	6–0 vs Zaragoza	6–0 vs Zaragoza	5–1 vs Tenerife
Biggest loss	0–4 vs Alcorcón	0–2 vs Barcelona	0–4 vs Alcorcón
Biggest win (League)	6–0 vs Zaragoza	6–0 vs Zaragoza	5–1 vs Tenerife
Biggest win (Cup)	1–0 vs Alcorcón	1–0 vs Alcorcón	–
Biggest win (Europe)	5–2 vs Zürich	3–0 vs Marseille	5–2 vs Zürich
Biggest loss (League)	0–2 vs Barcelona	0–2 vs Barcelona	1–2 vs Sevilla
Biggest loss (Cup)	0–4 vs Alcorcón	–	0–4 vs Alcorcón
Biggest loss (Europe)	2–3 vs Milan	2–3 vs Milan	0–1 vs Lyon
Clean sheets	18	12	6
Goals scored	119	68	51
Goals conceded	48	22	26
Goal difference	+71	+46	+25
Average GF per game	2.48	2.83	2.13
Average GA per game	1	0.92	1.08
Yellow cards	118	46	72
Red cards	3	2	1
Most appearances	(Spain) Iker Casillas (46)	–	
Most minutes played	(Spain) Iker Casillas (4326)	–	
Top scorer	(Portugal) Cristiano Ronaldo (33)	–	
Top assistor	(Spain) Guti (10)	–	
Points	113/144 (78.47%)	64/72 (88.89%)	49/72 (68.06%)
Winning rate	75%	87.5%	62.5%

Last updated: 16 May 2010
Source: Competitive matches

== Competitions ==
=== La Liga ===
==== League table ====
Pos	Team	Pld	W	D	L	GF	GA	GD	Pts	Qualification or relegation
1	Barcelona (C)	38	31	6	1	98	24	+74	99	Qualification for the Champions League group stage
2	Real Madrid	38	31	3	4	102	35	+67	96	Qualification for the Champions League group stage
3	Valencia	38	21	8	9	59	40	+19	71	Qualification for the Champions League group stage
4	Sevilla	38	19	6	13	65	49	+16	63	Qualification for the Champions League play-off round
5	Mallorca	38	18	8	12	59	44	+15	62 (Note: Mallorca could not qualify for the 2010–11 UEFA Europa League due to being immersed in a creditor contest, a situation against UEFA criteria. Then, Villarreal was invited to replace this spot.)	

Source: LFP and Yahoo! Sport
Rules for classification: 1) points; 2) head-to-head points; 3) head-to-head goal difference; 4) head-to-head goals scored; 5) goal difference; 6) number of goals scored.
(C) Champions

==== Results by round ====
Round	1	2	3	4	5	6	7	8	9	10	11	12	13	14	15	16	17	18	19	20	21	22	23	24	25	26	27	28	29	30	31	32	33	34	35	36	37	38
Ground	H	A	H	A	H	A	H	A	H	A	H	A	H	A	H	A	H	A	H	A	H	A	H	A	H	A	H	A	H	A	H	A	H	A	H	A	H	A
Result	W	W	W	W	W	L	W	D	W	W	W	L	W	W	W	D	W	L	W	W	W	W	W	W	W	W	W	W	W	W	L	W	W	W	W	W	W	D
Position	6	2	1	2	1	2	2	2	2	2	1	2	2	2	2	2	2	2	2	2	2	2	2	2	1	1	1	1	1	1	2	2	2	2	2	2	2	2

Updated to match(es) played on 16 May 2010. Source: Competitive matches
A = Away; H = Home; W = Win; D = Draw; L = Loss

==== Matches ====
Win Draw Loss

29 August 2009 1	Real Madrid	3–2	Deportivo La Coruña	Madrid
20:00 CEST (UTC+02:00)	Raúl 24'; Ronaldo 34' (pen.); L. Diarra (yellow card) 54', (goal) 59'; Albiol (yellow card) 71'	Report	Riki 29'; Aranzubia (yellow card) 34'; Valerón 47'; Lafita (yellow card) 80'	Stadium: Estadio Santiago Bernabéu; Attendance: 80,000; Referee: David Fernández Borbalán (Andalusia); Man of the Match: Raúl, L. Diarra

12 September 2009 2	Espanyol	0–3	Real Madrid	Cornellà de Llobregat
20:00 CEST (UTC+02:00)	Verdú (yellow card) 51'; Chica (yellow card) 55'	Report	Granero 39', (yellow card) 68'; Alonso (yellow card) 76'; Guti 77'; Ronaldo 90'	Stadium: Estadi Cornellà-El Prat; Attendance: 39,170; Referee: Alfonso Pérez Burrull (Cantabria); Man of the Match: Kaká

20 September 2009 3	Real Madrid	5–0	Xerez	Madrid
19:00 CEST (UTC+02:00)	Ronaldo 1', 75'; Guti 78'; Benzema 81'; Van Nistelrooy 88'	Report	Francis (yellow card) 78'	Stadium: Estadio Santiago Bernabéu; Attendance: 72,000; Referee: Carlos Delgado Ferreiro (Basque Country); Man of the Match: Ronaldo

23 September 2009 4	Villarreal	0–2	Real Madrid	Villarreal
20:00 CEST (UTC+02:00)	Gonzalo (yellow card) 12' (yellow-red card) 34'; Bruno (yellow card) 69'; López (yellow card) 71'	Report	Ronaldo 2'; Guti (yellow card) 51'; Gago (yellow card) 60'; Kaká 72' (pen.); L. Diarra (yellow card) 80'	Stadium: Estadio El Madrigal; Attendance: 20,615; Referee: Manuel Mejuto González (Asturias); Man of the Match: Ronaldo

26 September 2009 5	Real Madrid	3–0	Tenerife	Madrid
18:00 CEST (UTC+02:00)	Drenthe (yellow card) 24'; Benzema 48', 57'; Kaká 77'	Report	Martínez (yellow card) 5'; Nino (yellow card) 37'; Mikel (yellow card) 51'; Kome (yellow card) 51'; Luna (yellow card) 62'	Stadium: Estadio Santiago Bernabéu; Attendance: 75,200; Referee: César Muñiz Fernández (Asturias); Man of the Match: Kaká, Benzema

4 October 2009 6	Sevilla	2–1	Real Madrid	Seville
21:00 CEST (UTC+02:00)	Luís Fabiano (yellow card) 21'; Navas 32'; Zokora (yellow card) 35'; Perotti (yellow card) 35'; Adriano (yellow card) 60'; Renato 66'	Report	Ramos (yellow card) 19'; Guti (yellow card) 35'; Pepe 48'; Kaká (yellow card) 71'	Stadium: Estadio Ramón Sánchez Pizjuán; Attendance: 43,225; Referee: Eduardo Iturralde González (Basque Country); Man of the Match: Casillas

17 October 2009 7	Real Madrid	4–2	Valladolid	Madrid
20:00 CEST (UTC+02:00)	Raúl 13', 18'; Ramos (yellow card) 43'; Marcelo 45+1'; Alonso (yellow card) 53'; Higuaín 79'	Report	Arzo (yellow card) 19'; Nauzet 29'; Marquitos 52'; Pelé (yellow card) 90+1'	Stadium: Estadio Santiago Bernabéu; Attendance: 72,000; Referee: Miguel Ángel Ayza Gámez (Valencian Community); Man of the Match: Raúl

24 October 2009 8	Sporting Gijón	0–0	Real Madrid	Gijón
20:00 CEST (UTC+02:00)	Botía (yellow card) 49'; Rivera (yellow card) 83'	Report	Ramos (yellow card) 38'; Raúl (yellow card) 40'; Drenthe (yellow card) 55'; M. Diarra (yellow card) 83'	Stadium: El Molinón; Attendance: 25,284; Referee: Fernando Teixeira Vitienes (Cantabria)

31 October 2009 9	Real Madrid	2–0	Getafe	Madrid
20:00 CEST (UTC+02:00)	Albiol (red card) 27'; Alonso (yellow card) 32'; Marcelo (yellow card) 32'; Higuaín 52', 55'	Report	Mario (yellow card) 69'	Stadium: Estadio Santiago Bernabéu; Attendance: 72,000; Referee: Antonio Mateu Lahoz (Valencian Community); Man of the Match: Higuaín, Kaká

7 November 2009 10	Atlético Madrid	2–3	Real Madrid	Madrid
22:00 CET (UTC+01:00)	Pablo (yellow card) 27'; García (yellow card) 43'; Simão (yellow card) 61'; Forlán 80'; Agüero 82'	Report	Kaká 5', (yellow card) 7'; Marcelo 24'; L. Diarra (yellow card) 34'; Higuaín 64'; Ramos (red card) 66'; Arbeloa (yellow card) 70'; Garay (yellow card) 72'	Stadium: Estadio Vicente Calderón; Attendance: 54,800; Referee: Carlos Clos Gómez (Aragon); Man of the Match: Casillas

21 November 2009 11	Real Madrid	1–0	Racing Santander	Madrid
20:00 CET (UTC+01:00)	Higuaín 22'; Alonso (yellow card) 74'; Garay (yellow card) 77'	Report	Morris (yellow card) 52'; Munitis (yellow card) 72'; Lacen (yellow card) 89'	Stadium: Estadio Santiago Bernabéu; Attendance: 80,000; Referee: Rafael Ramírez Domínguez (Andalusia); Man of the Match: Higuaín

29 November 2009 12	Barcelona	1–0	Real Madrid	Barcelona
19:00 CET (UTC+01:00)	Busquets (yellow card) 50' (yellow-red card) 63'; Ibrahimović 56'; Puyol (yellow card) 66'	Report	Arbeloa (yellow card) 34'; Albiol (yellow card) 41'; L. Diarra (yellow card) 48' (yellow-red card) 90'; Pepe (yellow card) 69'; Marcelo (yellow card) 79'	Stadium: Camp Nou; Attendance: 97,138; Referee: Alberto Undiano Mallenco (Navarre); Man of the Match: Ronaldo, Pepe

5 December 2009 13	Real Madrid	4–2	Almería	Madrid
20:00 CET (UTC+01:00)	Ramos 30'; Higuaín 73'; Benzema 83'; Ronaldo 84', (yellow card) 84' (yellow-red card) 87'	Report	M'bami (yellow card) 45'; Soriano 58'; Uche 62'; Michel (yellow card) 79'; Alves (yellow card) 82'	Stadium: Estadio Santiago Bernabéu; Attendance: 77,600; Referee: Javier Estrada Fernández (Catalonia); Man of the Match: Higuaín, Ronaldo

13 December 2009 14	Valencia	2–3	Real Madrid	Valencia
22:00 CET (UTC+01:00)	Villa 59'; Navarro (yellow card) 73'; Joaquín 79'; Bruno (yellow card) 90+2'	Report	Alonso (yellow card) 6'; Higuaín 53', 65'; Ramos (yellow card) 62'; Garay 83'	Stadium: Estadio Mestalla; Attendance: 53,900; Referee: Fernando Teixeira Vitienes (Cantabria); Man of the Match: Higuaín, Van der Vaart

20 December 2009 15	Real Madrid	6–0	Zaragoza	Madrid
22:00 CET (UTC+01:00)	Higuaín 3', 34'; L. Diarra (yellow card) 20'; Van der Vaart 26', 29'; Ronaldo 50'; Benzema 71'; Ramos (yellow card) 80'	Report	Paredes (yellow card) 23'; Herrera (yellow card) 42'; Diogo (yellow card) 52'	Stadium: Estadio Santiago Bernabéu; Attendance: 60,000; Referee: Manuel Mejuto González (Asturias); Man of the Match: Higuaín, Van der Vaart

3 January 2010 16	Osasuna	0–0	Real Madrid	Pamplona
21:00 CET (UTC+01:00)	Nekounam (yellow card) 32'; Pandiani (yellow card) 42'; Masoud (yellow card) 73'	Report	Arbeloa (yellow card) 35'; Ramos (yellow card) 70'; L. Diarra (yellow card) 75'	Stadium: Estadio El Sadar; Attendance: 18,810; Referee: Antonio Mateu Lahoz (Valencian Community); Man of the Match: Garay, Arbeloa

10 January 2010 17	Real Madrid	2–0	Mallorca	Madrid
19:00 CET (UTC+01:00)	Higuaín 8'; Granero 50'	Report	Keita (yellow card) 65'; Valero (yellow card) 72'; Martí (yellow card) 78'	Stadium: Estadio Santiago Bernabéu; Attendance: 40,000; Referee: David Fernández Borbalán (Andalusia); Man of the Match: Higuaín, Garay

17 January 2010 18	Athletic Bilbao	1–0	Real Madrid	Bilbao
20:00 CET (UTC+01:00)	Llorente 3'; Gurpegui (yellow card) 8' (yellow-red card) 90+5'; Martínez (yellow card) 18'; Koikili (yellow card) 55'	Report	L. Diarra (yellow card) 21'; Ramos (yellow card) 26'; Alonso (yellow card) 52'; Ronaldo (yellow card) 90+3'	Stadium: Estadio San Mamés; Attendance: 39,200; Referee: Bernardino González Vázquez (Galicia); Man of the Match: Ronaldo, Alonso, Casillas

24 January 2010 19	Real Madrid	2–0	Málaga	Madrid
21:00 CET (UTC+01:00)	Ronaldo 35', 38', (red card) 70'	Report	Caicedo (yellow card) 42'; Gámez (yellow card) 56'; Toribio (yellow card) 88'	Stadium: Estadio Santiago Bernabéu; Attendance: 74,400; Referee: Miguel Ángel Pérez Lasa (Basque Country); Man of the Match: Guti, Ronaldo

30 January 2010 20	Deportivo La Coruña	1–3	Real Madrid	A Coruña
22:00 CET (UTC+01:00)	Juca (yellow card) 64'; Pablo (yellow card) 82'; Riki 87'; Rodríguez (yellow card) 90+3'	Report	Granero 12'; Benzema 39', 90+1'	Stadium: Estadio Riazor; Attendance: 34,600; Referee: Miguel Ángel Ayza Gámez (Valencian Community); Man of the Match: Benzema, Guti

7 February 2010 21	Real Madrid	3–0	Espanyol	Madrid
22:00 CET (UTC+01:00)	Ramos 5', (yellow card) 60'; Kaká 30'; Alonso (yellow card) 82'; Higuaín 90'	Report	Osvaldo (yellow card) 38'; Roncaglia (yellow card) 70'; Alonso (yellow card) 90+2'	Stadium: Estadio Santiago Bernabéu; Attendance: 72,000; Referee: Alfonso Pérez Burrull (Cantabria); Man of the Match: Granero

13 February 2010 22	Xerez	0–3	Real Madrid	Jerez
20:00 CET (UTC+01:00)	Keita (yellow card) 50'; Casado (yellow card) 61'	Report	Ramos (yellow card) 7'; Arbeloa (yellow card) 39', (goal) 64'; L. Diarra (yellow card) 53'; Ronaldo 69', 71'	Stadium: Estadio Municipal de Chapín; Attendance: 20,425; Referee: Javier Turienzo Álvarez (Castile and León); Man of the Match: Arbeloa, Ronaldo

21 February 2010 23	Real Madrid	6–2	Villarreal	Madrid
21:00 CET (UTC+01:00)	Ronaldo 17'; Kaká 20' (pen.), 79'; L. Diarra (yellow card) 48'; Higuaín 54', 71', (yellow card) 60'; Arbeloa (yellow card) 80'; Alonso 87' (pen.)	Report	Marcano (yellow card) 19'; Senna 30'; Venta (yellow card) 63'; Nilmar 66'; Pires (yellow card) 85'	Stadium: Estadio Santiago Bernabéu; Attendance: 72,000; Referee: César Muñiz Fernández (Asturias); Man of the Match: Ronaldo, Marcelo

27 February 2010 24	Tenerife	1–5	Real Madrid	Tenerife
19:00 WET (UTC+00:00)	Aragoneses (yellow card) 24'; Ayoze 47'; Luna (yellow card) 69'	Report	Alonso (yellow card) 22'; Higuaín 28', 40'; Kaká 48'; Ronaldo 80' (pen.); Raúl 90+1'	Stadium: Estadio Heliodoro Rodríguez López; Attendance: 21,120; Referee: Rafael Ramírez Domínguez (Andalusia); Man of the Match: Higuaín, Ronaldo

6 March 2010 25	Real Madrid	3–2	Sevilla	Madrid
22:00 CET (UTC+01:00)	Garay (yellow card) 26'; Arbeloa (yellow card) 31'; Ronaldo 60'; Ramos 64'; Marcelo (yellow card) 87'; Van der Vaart 90+2', (yellow card) 90+3'	Report	Alonso 10' (o.g.); Dragutinović (yellow card) 13', (goal) 52'; Capel (yellow card) 44'; Navarro (yellow card) 58'; Kanouté (yellow card) 61'	Stadium: Estadio Santiago Bernabéu; Attendance: 75,000; Referee: Eduardo Iturralde González (Basque Country)

14 March 2010 26	Valladolid	1–4	Real Madrid	Valladolid
21:00 CET (UTC+01:00)	Del Horno (yellow card) 12'; Lázaro (yellow card) 23'; Medunjanin (yellow card) 28'; Nauzet (yellow card) 53'; Albiol 57' (o.g.); Pelé (yellow card) 89'	Report	Ramos (yellow card) 20'; Ronaldo 27'; Alonso (yellow card) 30'; Granero (yellow card) 36'; Higuaín 44', 52', 65'	Stadium: Estadio José Zorrilla; Attendance: 20,000; Referee: Manuel Mejuto González (Asturias); Man of the Match: Higuaín, Ronaldo

20 March 2010 27	Real Madrid	3–1	Sporting Gijón	Madrid
20:00 CET (UTC+01:00)	Van der Vaart 55'; Alonso 57'; Higuaín 68', (yellow card) 78'; Garay (yellow card) 90'	Report	Barral 53'; Juan Pablo (yellow card) 56'	Stadium: Estadio Santiago Bernabéu; Attendance: 78,000; Referee: José Luis Paradas Romero (Andalusia); Man of the Match: Higuaín, Van der Vaart

25 March 2010 28	Getafe	2–4	Real Madrid	Getafe
20:00 CET (UTC+01:00)	Rafa (yellow card) 12'; Parejo 37'; Mario (yellow card) 50'; Pedro León 80'; Miku (yellow card) 89'	Report	Ronaldo 12', 36'; Higuaín 19', 22'; Gago (yellow card) 51'; Garay (yellow card) 87'	Stadium: Coliseum Alfonso Pérez; Attendance: 15,000; Referee: David Fernández Borbalán (Andalusia); Man of the Match: Higuaín, Ronaldo, Alonso

28 March 2010 29	Real Madrid	3–2	Atlético Madrid	Madrid
21:00 CEST (UTC+02:00)	Arbeloa (yellow card) 40', (goal) 54'; Alonso 48', (yellow card) 85'; Higuaín 63'; Ramos (yellow card) 83'	Report	Reyes 10'; Perea (yellow card) 45'; Forlán 67' (pen.)	Stadium: Estadio Santiago Bernabéu; Attendance: 83,000; Referee: Alberto Undiano Mallenco (Navarre); Man of the Match: Alonso, Higuaín, Ronaldo

4 April 2010 30	Racing Santander	0–2	Real Madrid	Santander
19:00 CEST (UTC+02:00)	Moratón (yellow card) 21'; Diop (yellow card) 43'; Torrejón (yellow card) 57'; Serrano (yellow card) 83'	Report	Albiol (yellow card) 9'; Ronaldo 22' (pen.); Higuaín 75'	Stadium: Campos de Sport de El Sardinero; Attendance: 22,271; Referee: Carlos Delgado Ferreiro (Basque Country); Man of the Match: Ronaldo, Guti

10 April 2010 31	Real Madrid	0–2	Barcelona	Madrid
22:00 CEST (UTC+02:00)	Alonso (yellow card) 13'; Albiol (yellow card) 30'; Ramos (yellow card) 61'; Garay (yellow card) 84'	Report	Messi (yellow card) 20', (goal) 33'; Xavi (yellow card) 31'; Alves (yellow card) 39'; Maxwell (yellow card) 52'; Pedro 56'	Stadium: Estadio Santiago Bernabéu; Attendance: 80,435; Referee: Manuel Mejuto González (Andalusia)

15 April 2010 32	Almería	1–2	Real Madrid	Almería
20:00 CEST (UTC+02:00)	Crusat 13'; Bernardello (yellow card) 37'; Cisma (yellow card) 41'; Pellerano (yellow card) 89'	Report	Gago (yellow card) 15'; Ronaldo 26'; M. Diarra (yellow card) 63'; Van der Vaart 69'; Guti (yellow card) 82'	Stadium: Estadio de los Juegos Mediterráneos; Attendance: 17,000; Referee: Miguel Ángel Pérez Lasa (Basque Country); Man of the Match: Ronaldo, Guti

18 April 2010 33	Real Madrid	2–0	Valencia	Madrid
21:00 CEST (UTC+02:00)	Higuaín 24'; Ronaldo (yellow card) 67', (goal) 78'; Albiol (yellow card) 90'	Report	Alexis (yellow card) 29'; Maduro (yellow card) 39'; Bruno (yellow card) 52'	Stadium: Estadio Santiago Bernabéu; Attendance: 70,000; Referee: Fernando Teixeira Vitienes (Cantabria); Man of the Match: Ronaldo, Guti

24 April 2010 34	Zaragoza	1–2	Real Madrid	Zaragoza
20:00 CEST (UTC+02:00)	Ponzio (yellow card) 10'; Eliseu (yellow card) 28'; Gabi (yellow card) 45+1'; Contini (red card) 52'; Colunga 61'	Report	Arbeloa (yellow card) 24'; Raúl 50'; Marcelo (yellow card) 56'; Kaká 82', (yellow card) 84'; Alonso (yellow card) 90+1'	Stadium: La Romareda; Attendance: 33,000; Referee: Alberto Undiano Mallenco (Navarre); Man of the Match: Raúl, Kaká

2 May 2010 35	Real Madrid	3–2	Osasuna	Madrid
19:00 CEST (UTC+02:00)	Ronaldo 25', 89'; Marcelo 44', (yellow card) 72'	Report	Aranda 7'; Vadócz 41'; Monreal (yellow card) 73'	Stadium: Estadio Santiago Bernabéu; Attendance: 80,000; Referee: Antonio Mateu Lahoz (Valencian Community); Man of the Match: Ronaldo, Marcelo

5 May 2010 36	Mallorca	1–4	Real Madrid	Palma
22:00 CEST (UTC+02:00)	Aduriz 16', (yellow card) 29'; Josemi (yellow card) 58'; Valero (yellow card) 65'; Nunes (yellow card) 89'	Report	Arbeloa (yellow card) 23'; Ronaldo 26', 56', 72'; Granero (yellow card) 63'; Higuaín 81'	Stadium: Iberostar Estadio; Attendance: 10,000; Referee: Carlos Clos Gómez (Aragon); Man of the Match: Ronaldo, Ramos

8 May 2010 37	Real Madrid	5–1	Athletic Bilbao	Madrid
21:00 CEST (UTC+02:00)	Ronaldo 22' (pen.); Gago (yellow card) 24'; Arbeloa (yellow card) 57'; Guti (yellow card) 63'; Higuaín 74'; Ramos 81'; Benzema 82'; Marcelo 90'	Report	Amorebieta (red card) 20'; Iraola (yellow card) 23'; Yeste 41'; Iraizoz (yellow card) 68'	Stadium: Estadio Santiago Bernabéu; Attendance: 80,000; Referee: César Muñiz Fernández (Asturias); Man of the Match: Benzema, Higuaín

16 May 2010 38	Málaga	1–1	Real Madrid	Málaga
19:00 CEST (UTC+02:00)	Duda 8', (red card) 90+1'; Gámez (yellow card) 10'; Rosário (yellow card) 38'; Obinna (yellow card) 84'; Luque (yellow card) 88'	Report	Van der Vaart (yellow card) 25', (goal) 48'; Higuaín (yellow card) 27'; Guti (yellow card) 28'; Ronaldo (yellow card) 87'	Stadium: Estadio La Rosaleda; Attendance: 27,000; Referee: Alberto Undiano Mallenco (Navarre); Man of the Match: Van der Vaart, Marcelo

=== Copa del Rey ===
==== Round of 32 ====
27 October 2009 First leg	Alcorcón	4–0	Real Madrid	Alcorcón
22:00 CET (UTC+01:00)	Nagore (yellow card) 7'; Borja 16', 53'; Arbeloa 22' (o.g.); Ernesto 39'; López (yellow card) 52'; Juanma (yellow card) 90+1'	Report	Guti (yellow card) 43'; Albiol (yellow card) 61'; M. Diarra (yellow card) 77'	Stadium: Estadio Municipal de Santo Domingo; Attendance: 2,997; Referee: Javier Turienzo Álvarez (Castile and León)

10 November 2009 Second leg	Real Madrid	1–0 (1–4 agg.)	Alcorcón	Madrid
20:00 CET (UTC+01:00)	Albiol (yellow card) 34'; Kaká (yellow card) 77'; Van der Vaart 81'	Report	Nagore (yellow card) 40'; Sanz (yellow card) 65'	Stadium: Estadio Santiago Bernabéu; Attendance: 76,500; Referee: David Fernández Borbalán (Andalusia)

=== UEFA Champions League ===
==== Group stage ====
Pos	Team	Pld	W	D	L	GF	GA	GD	Pts	Qualification
1	(Spain) Real Madrid	6	4	1	1	15	7	+8	13	Advance to knockout phase
2	(Italy) Milan	6	2	3	1	8	7	+1	9	Advance to knockout phase
3	(France) Marseille	6	2	1	3	10	10	0	7	Transfer to Europa League
4	(Switzerland) Zürich	6	1	1	4	5	14	−9	4	

Source: RSSSF

15 September 2009 1	Zürich (Switzerland)	2–5	(Spain) Real Madrid	Zürich, Switzerland
20:45 CEST (UTC+02:00)	Stahel (yellow card) 24'; Tico (yellow card) 49'; Margairaz 64' (pen.); Aegerter 65'	Report	Kaká (yellow card) 16'; Drenthe (yellow card) 24'; Ronaldo 27', 89'; Raúl 34'; Higuaín 45+1'; Casillas (yellow card) 63'; Gago (yellow card) 68'; Guti (yellow card) 74', (goal) 90+4'; L. Diarra (yellow card) 81'	Stadium: Letzigrund; Attendance: 24,424; Referee: Martin Atkinson (England); Man of the Match: Ronaldo

30 September 2009 2	Real Madrid (Spain)	3–0	(France) Marseille	Madrid, Spain
20:45 CEST (UTC+02:00)	Ronaldo 58', 64'; Kaká 61' (pen.)	Report	Diawara (yellow card) 47' (yellow-red card) 60'; Mbia (yellow card) 54'; Heinze (yellow card) 62'; Rodriguez (yellow card) 67'	Stadium: Estadio Santiago Bernabéu; Attendance: 67,244; Referee: Martin Hansson (Sweden); Man of the Match: Ronaldo

21 October 2009 3	Real Madrid (Spain)	2–3	(Italy) Milan	Madrid, Spain
20:45 CEST (UTC+02:00)	Raúl 19', (yellow card) 86'; Albiol (yellow card) 53'; Drenthe 76'; Marcelo (yellow card) 90+3'	Report	Pirlo 62'; Pato 66', 88'; Zambrotta (yellow card) 71'; Ronaldinho (yellow card) 86'; Nesta (yellow card) 86'	Stadium: Estadio Santiago Bernabéu; Attendance: 71,569; Referee: Frank De Bleeckere (Belgium); Man of the Match: Pato

3 November 2009 4	Milan (Italy)	1–1	(Spain) Real Madrid	Milan, Italy
20:45 CET (UTC+01:00)	Ronaldinho 35' (pen.); Pato (yellow card) 55'	Report	Benzema 29'; Marcelo (yellow card) 58'; Arbeloa (yellow card) 76'; Pepe (yellow card) 90'	Stadium: San Siro; Attendance: 75,092; Referee: Felix Brych (Germany)

25 November 2009 5	Real Madrid (Spain)	1–0	(Switzerland) Zürich	Madrid, Spain
20:45 CET (UTC+01:00)	Higuaín 21'; L. Diarra (yellow card) 61'; Alonso (yellow card) 83'	Report	Barmettler (yellow card) 56'; Djurić (yellow card) 63'; Stahel (yellow card) 65'	Stadium: Estadio Santiago Bernabéu; Attendance: 67,867; Referee: Alain Hamer (Luxembourg)

8 December 2009 6	Marseille (France)	1–3	(Spain) Real Madrid	Marseille, France
20:45 CET (UTC+01:00)	Brandão (yellow card) 9'; González 11'; Heinze (yellow card) 63'	Report	Ronaldo 5', 80'; Higuaín (yellow card) 29'; Alonso (yellow card) 37'; Albiol 60'; Casillas (yellow card) 66'	Stadium: Stade Vélodrome; Attendance: 55,722; Referee: Wolfgang Stark (Germany); Man of the Match: Ronaldo

==== Knockout phase ====
===== Round of 16 =====
16 February 2010 First leg	Lyon (France)	1–0	(Spain) Real Madrid	Lyon, France
20:45 CET (UTC+01:00)	Govou (yellow card) 29'; Makoun 47'	Report	Arbeloa (yellow card) 33'; Marcelo (yellow card) 35'; Alonso (yellow card) 45+1'	Stadium: Stade de Gerland; Attendance: 40,327; Referee: Martin Atkinson (England)

10 March 2010 Second leg	Real Madrid (Spain)	1–1 (1–2 agg.)	(France) Lyon	Madrid, Spain
20:45 CET (UTC+01:00)	Ronaldo 6'; Granero (yellow card) 38'	Report	Cris (yellow card) 26'; Delgado (yellow card) 67'; Pjanić 75'	Stadium: Estadio Santiago Bernabéu; Attendance: 71,569; Referee: Nicola Rizzoli (Italy)

== Pre-season and friendlies ==
20 July 2009 Friendly	Shamrock Rovers	0–1	Real Madrid	Dublin, Republic of Ireland
21:00 CET	Craig Sives (yellow card) 18'	Report	Salgado (yellow card) 74'; Benzema 87'	Stadium: Tallaght Stadium; Attendance: 10,000; Referee: Alan Kelly; Man of the Match: Benzema, Marcelo

26 July 2009 Peace Cup – Group stage	Real Madrid	1–1	Al-Ittihad	Madrid, Spain
22:30 CET	Raúl 56'	Report	Aboucherouane 64'	Stadium: Estadio Santiago Bernabéu; Attendance: 20,000; Referee: Koukoulakis; Man of the Match: Raúl, Metzelder

28 July 2009 Peace Cup – Group stage	Real Madrid	4–2	LDU Quito	Madrid, Spain
22:30 CET	Marcelo (yellow card) 43'; Ronaldo 48' (pen.); Granero 53'; Metzelder (yellow card) 65'; Metzelder 72'; Negredo 92'	Report	Bieler (yellow card) 46'; Araújo (yellow card) 48', (goal) 68', 84'	Stadium: Estadio Santiago Bernabéu; Attendance: 45,000; Referee: Kevin Blom; Man of the Match: Ronaldo, Granero

31 July 2009 Peace Cup – Semi-final	Real Madrid	1–2	Juventus	Seville, Spain
22:30 CET	Granero (yellow card) 25'; Drenthe (yellow card) 34'; Ronaldo 40' (pen.)	Report	Cannavaro 3'; Melo (yellow card) 13'; Salihamidžić 49'; Salihamidžić (yellow card) 62'; Camoranesi (yellow card) 74'; Grygera (yellow card) 89'; Amauri (yellow card) 93'	Stadium: Estadio Ramón Sánchez Pizjuán; Attendance: 23,000; Referee: Johannesson, Yefet; Man of the Match: Ronaldo, Granero

7 August 2009 Friendly	Toronto FC	1–5	Real Madrid	Toronto, Canada
01:30 CET	Gala 75'	Report	Raúl 13', 26'; Ronaldo 19'; Benzema 65'; Robben 86'	Stadium: BMO Field; Attendance: 22,089; Referee: Paul Ward; Man of the Match: Raúl, Ronaldo

9 August 2009 Friendly	D.C. United	0–3	Real Madrid	Maryland, United States
21:00 CET		Report	Higuaín 57', 59'; Robben 69'	Stadium: FedExField; Attendance: 72,368; Referee: Baldomero Toledo; Man of the Match: Granero, Higuaín

15 August 2009 Real Sociedad Centenary	Real Sociedad	0–2	Real Madrid	San Sebastián, Spain
22:00 CET		Report	Benzema 49'; Sneijder 90+2'	Stadium: Anoeta Stadium; Attendance: 26,000; Referee: Pérez Lasa; Man of the Match: Kaká

19 August 2009 Borussia Dortmund Centenary	Borussia Dortmund	0–5	Real Madrid	Dortmund, Germany
20:15 CET		Report	Granero 2'; Robben 47'; Marcelo (yellow card) 66'; Higuaín 72'; Kaká 75' (pen.); Raúl 89'	Stadium: Westfalenstadion; Attendance: 75,000; Referee: Thorsten Kinhöfer; Man of the Match: Kaká, Robben

24 August 2009 Trofeo Santiago Bernabéu	Real Madrid	4–0	Rosenborg	Madrid, Spain
22:00 CET	Benzema 11', 54'; L. Diarra 25'; Raúl 54'	Report		Stadium: Santiago Bernabéu Stadium; Attendance: 79,500; Referee: Rubinos Pérez; Man of the Match: Benzema

20 January 2010 Taçi Oil Cup	Gramozi Ersekë	1–2	Real Madrid	Tirana, Albania
18:00 CET		Report	(yellow card) 24' Guti; 36' Kaká; 81' Benzema	Stadium: Qemal Stafa Stadium; Attendance: 75,000; Referee: Thorsten Kinhöfer; Man of the Match: Guti

Last updated: 20 January 2010.
Source: Pre-season 2009/10, Pre-season Schedule and Peace Cup

== See also ==
- 2009–10 UEFA Champions League
- 2009–10 La Liga
- 2009–10 Copa del Rey
