= Manuel Pellegrini =

Chilean football manager (born 1953)

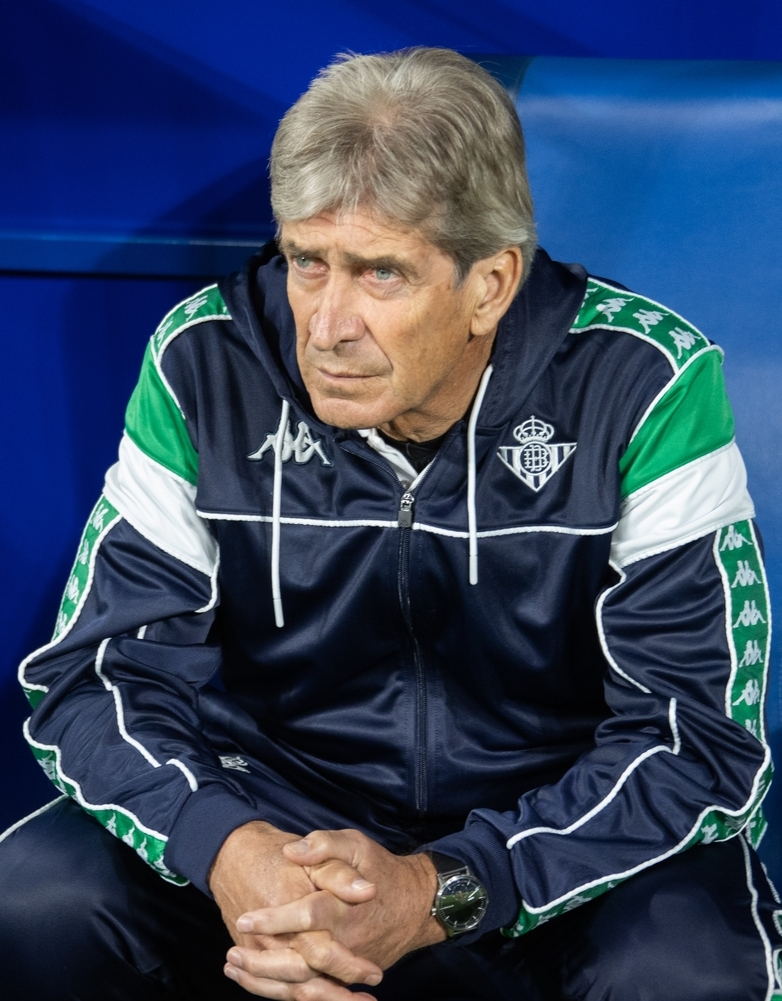
- Pellegrini as manager of Real Betis in 2022

Personal information
- Full name: Manuel Luis Pellegrini Ripamonti
- Date of birth: 16 September 1953 (age 73)
- Place of birth: Santiago, Chile
- Height: 1.84 m (6 ft 0 in)
- Position: Centre-back

Team information
- Current team: Real Betis (head coach)

Youth career
- Audax Italiano
- Universidad de Chile

Senior career*
Years	Team	Apps	(Gls)
1973–1986	Universidad de Chile	315	(7)
Total		315	(7)

International career
1986	Chile	1	(0)

Managerial career
- 1988–1989: Universidad de Chile
- 1990–1991: Palestino
- 1991: Chile U20
- 1992–1993: O'Higgins
- 1994–1996: Universidad Católica
- 1998: Palestino
- 1999–2000: LDU Quito
- 2001–2002: San Lorenzo
- 2002–2003: River Plate
- 2004–2009: Villarreal
- 2009–2010: Real Madrid
- 2010–2013: Málaga
- 2013–2016: Manchester City
- 2016–2018: Hebei China Fortune
- 2018–2019: West Ham United
- 2020–: Real Betis
- * Club domestic league appearances and goals

Manuel Luis Pellegrini Ripamonti (Spanish pronunciation: [maˈnwel peleˈɣɾini]; Italian: [pelleˈɡriːni]; born 16 September 1953) is a Chilean professional football manager and former player who is the head coach of La Liga club Real Betis. He has managed clubs in Spain, England, Argentina, Chile, China, and Ecuador, winning league titles in four different countries.

Pellegrini first moved to Europe in 2004 to take the manager's post at Spanish side Villarreal. Under Pellegrini, Villarreal achieved a third-place finish in La Liga in 2004–05, a Champions League semi-final in 2005–06, and a historic second-place finish in La Liga in 2007–08.

Pellegrini's consistent record at Villarreal attracted the attention of Real Madrid, who appointed him as manager for the 2009–10 season. He amassed a total of 96 points, a club record until it was surpassed by José Mourinho in the 2011–12 season, but lost the title to Barcelona by three points. He was dismissed after one season and later lamented the Galácticos policy employed by Madrid, which prevented him from building a balanced team.

Pellegrini took up the manager's role at Málaga in November 2010. He led Málaga to a fourth-place finish in La Liga in his first full season and to qualification for the UEFA Champions League. He made it to the quarter-finals of the 2012–13 Champions League, becoming the only coach to take two different teams to the quarter-finals in their debut seasons in the competition. On 22 May 2013, Pellegrini confirmed he would leave Málaga at the end of the 2012–13 season.

On 14 June 2013, he was appointed manager of Manchester City, and won the Football League Cup and Premier League in his first season, becoming the first manager from outside Europe to manage a team to the Premier League title. The title winning season was also noted for goal scoring prowess, with City scoring 151 goals in all competitions – an English football record. Pellegrini also managed to take Manchester City to their first ever Champions League semi-final in 2015–16, which was his last season, after finishing in fourth-place the league, and winning another Football League Cup.

He was appointed as manager of West Ham United in May 2018 and lasted 18 months in charge, before he was sacked in December 2019 after a poor run of results. On 9 July 2020, Spanish club Real Betis announced that he would manage the side for the 2020–21 season.

== Playing career ==
Born in Santiago, to Italian parents, Pellegrini attended the Pontifical Catholic University of Chile in Santiago, where he graduated in civil engineering in 1979. He started his formative years as a footballer in the youth divisions of Audax Italiano. Then he went to Club Universidad de Chile where he would play professionally for them as a defender. He spent his entire playing career with the club, making a total of 451 appearances and scoring seven goals in the Chilean Division 1, including one goal against Colo-Colo, Universidad de Chile's biggest rival.

In the 1970s, Club Universidad de Chile was going through one of the most unsuccessful periods in its history, having not won the national Copa Chile championship since 1969. That changed in 1979, when the club managed to win the championship and secure a spot for the 1980 Copa Libertadores, defeating its arch-rival Colo-Colo in both tournaments.

Pellegrini was capped once by the Chile national team, starting in a 1–1 friendly draw away to Brazil on 7 May 1986. He retired as a player a year later, in February 1987, after a match against Trasandino, with his reason for retiring being the following: "We were playing in the Copa Chile against Trasandino. Our goalkeeper parried the shot of a rival player, I jumped to clear the ball, and behind me came a 17-year-old boy who jumped half a metre above me, and scored. That day I decided I couldn't keep going". That boy was Iván Zamorano, on loan from Cobresal, who would eventually become Pichichi of La Liga in 1995 with Real Madrid. Pellegrini confessed: "If I had known where that boy would get, I would not have retired. I would have kept playing two more years."

Pellegrini wanted to help reconstruction projects in the Chilean central zone after the 1985 Algarrobo earthquake knowing that his experience as a qualified civil engineer would be ideal.

== Managerial career ==
=== Early years ===
As a coach, Pellegrini has primarily managed teams in Spain, Argentina and Chile. As in his career as a professional player, he also started off coaching Universidad de Chile during the 1988 season, but left the team at the middle of the season to take football coaching courses in Europe.

The team's poor performance that year led to a relegation to the Division 2 for the first time in its history, though in 1989 they won the Division 2 championship, bringing them back to Division 1, where they have remained ever since.

In 1990, Arturo Salah was appointed as the manager of the Chile national team, and he hired Pellegrini as his assistant coach and manager of the under-20 team. In 1990, Pellegrini was appointed manager of Palestino, where he stayed until 1992. Then, in 1992, he took on managership of O'Higgins for a year, before moving in 1993 to become coach of Universidad Católica, one of the most popular clubs in Chile. There he managed well-known players such as Alberto Acosta and Nestor Gorosito and took the team to victory in the prestigious Copa Interamericana in 1994 and the 1995 Copa Chile, though he could only finish as runner-up in 1994 and 1995 of the local Campeonato Nacional championship, a competition organized by the Chilean Football Federation in parallel to the Primera Division.

In 1998, Pellegrini had a brief spell back at Palestino before he was bought by Ecuadorian club LDU Quito. He managed the club to a national title in 1999, starting a tradition of coaches that followed him to the Ecuadorian team. Pellegrini also gave the club a good run in the Copa Libertadores, catching the eye of other South American managers.

=== San Lorenzo ===
Pellegrini joined Argentine club San Lorenzo in 2001 and led them to their first international title in the Copa Mercosur. He was recommended to the club by San Lorenzo icon Nestor Gorosito, who had worked with Pellegrini at Universidad Católica. The recommendation paid dividends, as Pellegrini led San Lorenzo to victory in the Argentine Clausura and the Copa Mercosur, South America's UEFA Cup equivalent.

=== River Plate ===
Pellegrini managed Argentine club River Plate from 2002 to 2003 and secured the Clausura championships in 2003. He resigned his post at the end of the campaign.

=== Villarreal ===
Pellegrini took over the managerial duties of Villarreal on 1 July 2004. In his first season in charge of the club, Villarreal qualified for the UEFA Champions League after finishing third in the league and reached the quarter-finals of the UEFA Cup. The following season, Villarreal reached the semi-finals of the 2005–06 UEFA Champions League, losing to Arsenal. Villarreal eventually finished seventh in La Liga that year. The following two seasons featured Villarreal finishing in both fifth and second place in the league, the latter being historic for the club. Pellegrini led El Submarino Amarillo to the Champions League knockout stages, where they drew Arsenal once again in the quarter-finals, losing 4–1 on aggregate.

At the end of 2007, Villarreal offered Pellegrini an extended contract until 2011. On 31 May 2009, after the last La Liga match for Villarreal, Pellegrini said: "Nobody from Real Madrid has spoken with me. I have a contract with Villarreal, we finished the league today, and tomorrow we go on holiday", after being questioned by the press on rumours that he was in talks with Madrid. On 1 June 2009, a Villarreal executive announced that Pellegrini would no longer continue at the club. The Valencian club executive specified that if Real Madrid wanted to sign the Chilean coach, they would have to pay Pellegrini's €4 million termination clause.

=== Real Madrid ===
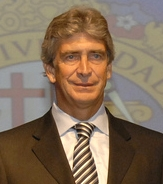
Pellegrini as manager of Real Madrid in 2009

On 1 June 2009, Pellegrini was appointed as manager of Real Madrid, signing a two-year contract. On being presented at the presidential balcony of the Santiago Bernabéu, he said: "Hard to say in a few words the excitement and pride that one feels for having been chosen to direct perhaps the most important club in the world." He joined Real Madrid as the first manager in Florentino Pérez's second stint as Real Madrid president. After a few days, Pellegrini bought Kaká from Milan, saying, "If we want to win the Champions League and be the best team in the world, we need the best players in the world." They later bought Cristiano Ronaldo for £80 million from Manchester United, Karim Benzema from Lyon for £30 million and Xabi Alonso for £30 million from Liverpool.

On 27 October 2009 the club was eliminated from the Copa del Rey during the Round of 16 by the modest Segunda División B club Alcorcón with a 4–1 aggregate loss. The Spanish daily Marca named this match "Alcorconazo" and went on to make many teasing references to Pellegrini. On 10 March 2010, Madrid were eliminated from the Champions League by Lyon in the round-of-16 with a 2–1 aggregate loss. Florentino Pérez issued an ultimatum to Pellegrini after this defeat, warning him that he would be dismissed if he did not win the La Liga title.

Pellegrini's Real Madrid team achieved 96 points in La Liga, the highest points total that Real Madrid had ever achieved in a La Liga season up to that point (since surpassed by the 2011–12 team under José Mourinho), but still came in runner-up, finishing behind their arch rival Barcelona, who had 99 points. On 26 May 2010, Real Madrid's directors announced that Pellegrini was being dismissed, to be replaced by Mourinho, but that they would have kept him if the opportunity to hire Mourinho had not arisen.

Pellegrini later reflected on his frustration at not being able to build a team at Real Madrid due to the club's controversial Galácticos policy: "I didn't have a voice or a vote at Madrid. They sign the best players, but not the best players needed in a certain position. It's no good having an orchestra with the 10 best guitarists if I don't have a pianist. Real Madrid have the best guitarists, but if I ask them to play the piano they won't be able to do it so well. He [Pérez] sold players that I considered important. We didn't win the Champions League because we didn't have a squad properly structured to be able to win it."

=== Málaga ===
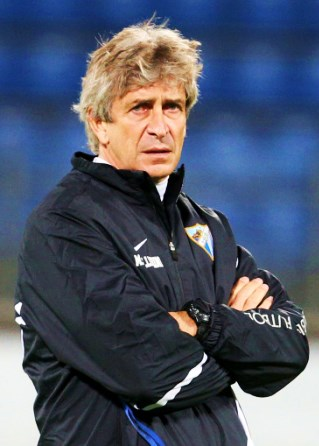
Pellegrini as manager of Málaga in 2012

After being released by Real Madrid, on 22 July 2010, Pellegrini received an offer from the Mexico national team; Javier Aguirre resigned following the 2010 World Cup loss in round 16 in South Africa. Pellegrini, however, eventually signed for La Liga club Málaga on a three-year contract, their coach Jesualdo Ferreira having been dismissed. On 5 November, he was officially presented as the new coach of Málaga during a press conference with the club's owner Abdullah bin Nasser Al Thani, and watched from the stands as they lost 1–0 to Espanyol the following day. On 11 November 2010, he made his Málaga debut as coach against Hércules in a 3–2 victory in the Copa del Rey at the La Rosaleda, which led them to the round of 16 after the teams had drawn 0–0 in the first leg at the Estadio José Rico Pérez two weeks previously, and continued his winning start as new coach of Malaga by beating Levante 1–0 in his league debut four days later. That season Malaga only managed to finish 11th.

After his first full season with the team, he led them to fourth in the league with a club record-breaking 58 points. With his guidance, Málaga entered the Champions League qualifiers for the first time in the club's history. On 10 August 2012, Pellegrini publicly stated his desire to stay at the club, despite its ongoing financial problems and the loss of key players such as Santi Cazorla and Salomón Rondón.

Málaga progressed to latter stages of the Champions League, where they were drawn against Milan, Zenit Saint Petersburg and Anderlecht. The club progressed to the knockout stage unbeaten, winning three and drawing three in the group stage. Málaga then beat Porto 2–1 on aggregate in the round-of-16. They were eliminated by Borussia Dortmund after conceding two stoppage time goals which cost them a semi-final place.

On 22 May 2013, at Málaga's end-of-season award ceremony, Pellegrini announced he would leave the club at the end of the season, with Málaga finishing sixth and excluded from Europe due to Financial Fair Play. In October 2018, a roundabout in Malaga was named in his honour.

=== Manchester City ===
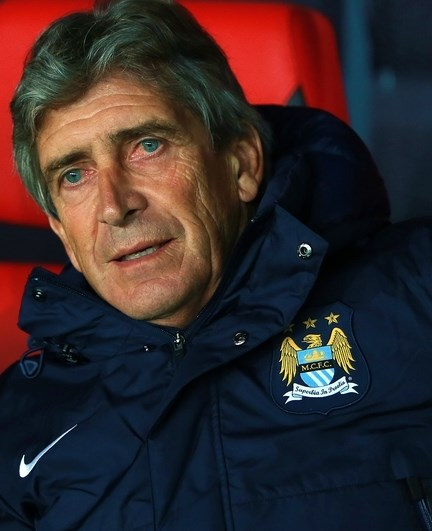
Pellegrini as manager of Manchester City in 2013

On 30 May 2013, Pellegrini stated he had a verbal agreement to become the new manager of Premier League club Manchester City. On 14 June 2013, Manchester City confirmed Pellegrini's appointment as their new first-team manager on a three-year contract. Pellegrini was quoted saying he was "delighted to accept this hugely exciting opportunity." Upon joining Manchester City, Pellegrini became only the fifth coach from outside of Europe to manage in the Premier League, and the first Chilean.

Pellegrini initially made a shaky start, with four league losses by the end of November, but big wins against Newcastle United, Manchester United and Norwich City showed the team's potential. After their fourth league loss against Sunderland on 10 November 2013, City went on a 20-match unbeaten streak (in all competitions), which included a 6–0 win over Tottenham Hotspur, a 3–2 away win at European champions Bayern Munich, and a 6–3 win over league leaders Arsenal.

After a hectic Christmas period, City's form showed no signs of abating. A 9–0 aggregate win over West Ham United in the Football League Cup semi-final (a competition record) and a 5–1 humbling of Tottenham Hotspur at White Hart Lane maintained City's average of more than three goals a game. Of the 20 matches, only two were draws, against Southampton and Blackburn Rovers, in the FA Cup – both of which ended 1–1. Some opponents openly described City as the best team in the world, and talk about an unprecedented quadruple soon arose in the media.

Pellegrini won the Premier League Manager of the Month award for December 2013 and on 18 January 2014, City surpassed 100 goals for the season, in all competitions, in just 34 games – the quickest century in the Premier League era, beating Chelsea's 2012–13 record by eight matches. By the end of January 2014, they had scored 115 goals in all competitions – the most goals scored by any club in Europe. Maintaining such a scoring rate would see them surpass the 143 scored by Manchester United's Busby Babes in the 1957–58 season.

On 2 March 2014, Pellegrini's Manchester City defeated Sunderland 3–1 at Wembley in the 2014 Football League Cup Final, giving him his first major trophy in European football. On 11 May, Manchester City became Premier League champions, after beating West Ham United 2–0, with goals from Samir Nasri and Vincent Kompany at the City of Manchester Stadium, making Pellegrini the first coach from outside of Europe to win the English league title.

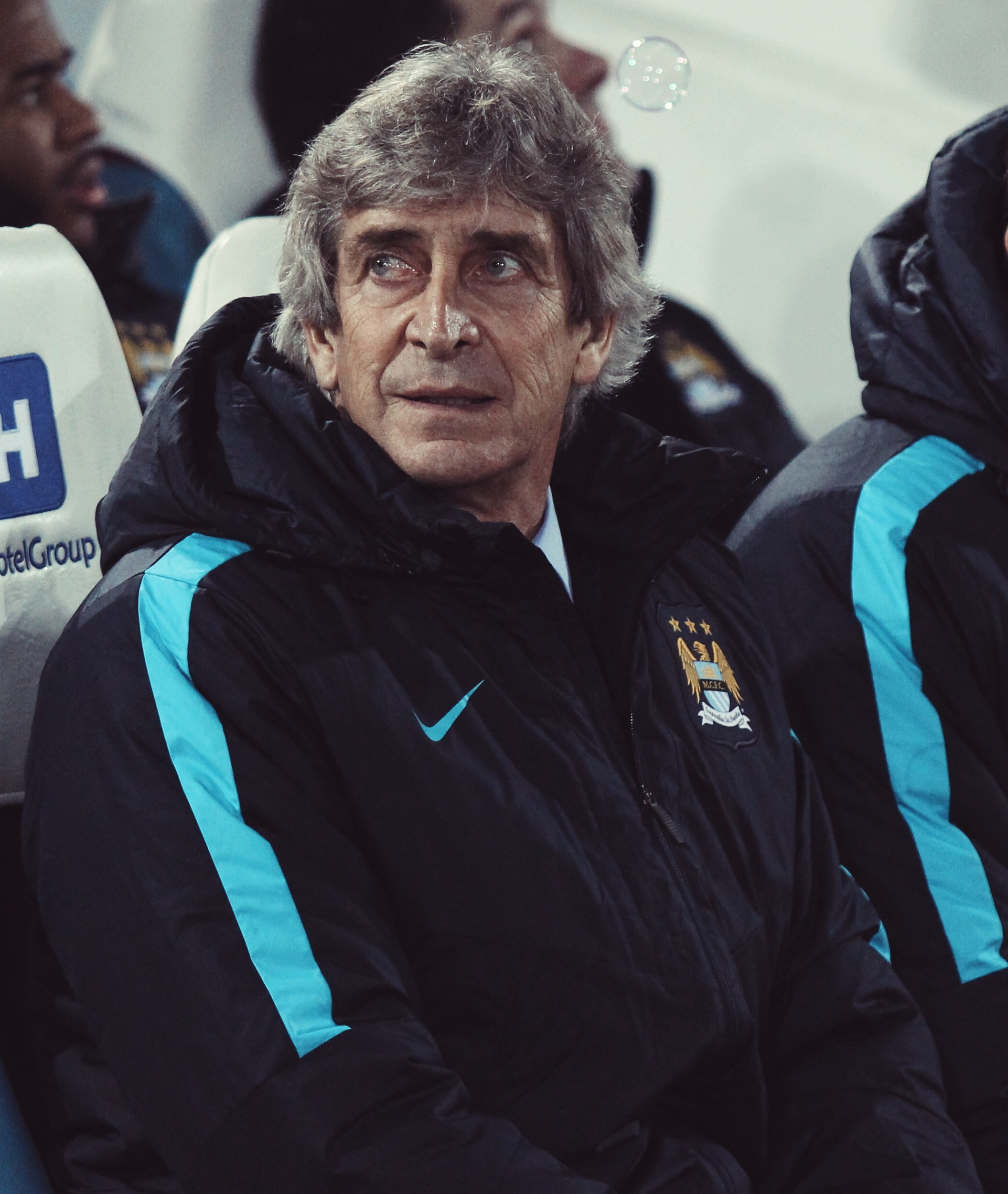
Pellegrini with Manchester City in 2016

On 29 October 2014, City were defeated 2–0 by Newcastle United in the League Cup, thus failing to defend their title. On 24 January 2015, Pellegrini's men were knocked out of the FA Cup, after a 2–0 loss to Championship team Middlesbrough.

Despite sharing the top spot in the Premier League on New Year's Day, Manchester City suffered a dip in form in the second half of the season and claimed just 18 points from a possible 36. City were also knocked out of the Champions League in the round of the last 16 for a successive season, following a 3–1 aggregate defeat to Barcelona.

On 7 August 2015, Manchester City announced that Pellegrini had signed a one-year contract extension, which would keep him with the club until June 2017. Pellegrini commented: "I am proud to manage Manchester City and am therefore very pleased to have agreed to this contract.

On 1 February 2016, Manchester City confirmed Pellegrini would be leaving in June, at the end of his original contract, and that Pep Guardiola would be taking over for the 2016–17 season. Pellegrini left Manchester City with the fifth-highest win percentage in Premier League history.

=== Hebei China Fortune ===
On 27 August 2016, Pellegrini was named manager of Chinese Super League club Hebei China Fortune, replacing Li Tie. He took charge of his first match on 10 September 2016 in a home game against Guangzhou Evergrande, which Hebei lost 3–0.

On 19 May 2018, Hebei China Fortune confirmed Pellegrini had left the club. Pellegrini's last match in charge of Hebei was a 2–1 win over Chongqing Dangdai Lifan.

=== West Ham United ===
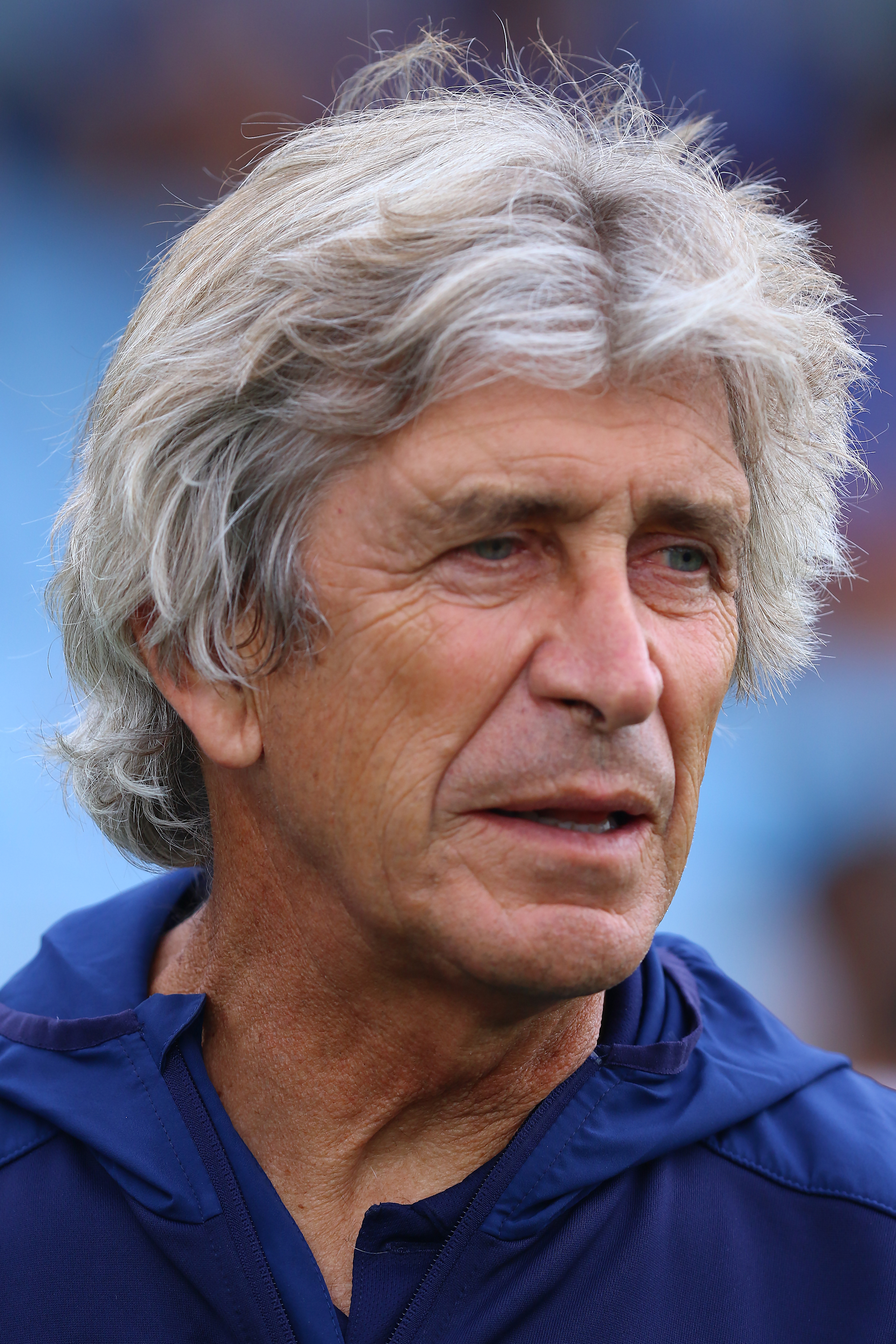
Pellegrini as manager of West Ham United in 2019

On 22 May 2018, Premier League club West Ham United appointed Pellegrini as their new manager on a three-year contract. In his first game as West Ham manager, on 12 August, the team lost 4–0 away to Liverpool. His first win with the club came in an EFL Cup match against AFC Wimbledon on 28 August. In the Premier League, having presided over four defeats at the start of the 2018–19 season, Pellegrini oversaw his first win on 16 September with a 3–1 win over Everton. In January 2019, West Ham were knocked out of the FA Cup in the fourth round by Wimbledon, losing 4–2. At the time Wimbledon were five points adrift at the bottom of League One and playing in the fourth round for the first time in the club’s history. West Ham finished in 10th position in the Premier League in Pellegrini's first season in charge; their first top-ten finish since 2016.

West Ham broke their transfer record twice under Pellegrini, paying £36 million for Felipe Anderson in 2018 and £45 million for striker Sebastien Haller in 2019. They spent £155 million in transfer fees while he was in charge, including £71 million in the summer before the 2019-20 season. However, in the first Premier League game of the season, Pellegrini suffered a heavy 5–0 defeat against his former club, Manchester City. In September 2019, they were knocked out from the EFL Cup, losing 4–0 to Oxford United of League One. He was sacked by the club on 28 December 2019 after a 2–1 home loss to Leicester City, their fourth-straight home defeat, with the club in 17th place and having won only five league games all season. His time at West Ham saw a win rate of 38.98% of all games played.

=== Real Betis ===
On 9 July 2020, it was announced that Pellegrini would become the manager of Real Betis in La Liga ahead of the 2020–21 season, replacing Alexis Trujillo who had served as an interim coach following the dismissal of Rubi the previous month.

Under Pellegrini, Real Betis has achieved historic records for the club. They have qualified for European competition five seasons in a row, four for the UEFA Europa League and one for the UEFA Conference League, in which they reached a European final for the first time in Betis history in 2025. Betis secured their first trophy in 17 years after beating Valencia on penalties in the 2022 Copa del Rey final, this was also Pellegrini's first major trophy in Spain after 13 years of managing in the country.

On 27 November 2025, Pellegrini extended his contract with Real Betis until 2028, with an exit clause allowing him to leave to manage the Chilean national team. In the 2025–26 season, he guided the club to a fifth-place finish in La Liga, securing qualification for the Champions League for only the second time in their history, following the 2005–06 season.

== Style of management ==
Pellegrini has been roundly praised throughout his career for his attacking managerial style, calm demeanor and excellent man management. Such was Manchester City's ruthlessness in front of goal from all angles – intricate passing moves, crosses, solo-runs and set pieces – The Daily Telegraph likened City's style to "death by beautiful geometry".

== Personal life ==
His son, Manuel Pellegrini Pucci, is a traumatologist who works in the medical staff of Audax Italiano since 2022. As of 26 September 2022, he was under investigation by HMRC for tax evasion. The amount claimed by HMRC is £816,579.80.

== Managerial statistics ==
As of match played 21 November 2026

Managerial record by team and tenure
Team	From	To	Record					Ref.
Team	From	To	P	W	D	L	Win %	Ref.
Universidad de Chile	1 January 1988	31 January 1989	38	11	13	14	28.95	
Palestino	1 January 1990	31 December 1991	90	31	31	28	34.44	
O'Higgins	1 January 1992	31 December 1993	76	30	22	24	39.47	
Universidad Católica	1 January 1994	30 June 1996	124	72	29	23	58.06	
Palestino	1 January 1998	31 December 1998	21	4	7	10	19.05	
L.D.U. Quito	1 January 1999	30 June 2000	76	35	16	25	46.05	
San Lorenzo	15 February 2001	30 June 2002	78	38	20	20	48.72	
River Plate	1 July 2002	31 December 2003	77	42	14	21	54.55	
Villarreal	1 July 2004	1 June 2009	259	123	72	64	47.49	
Real Madrid	1 June 2009	26 May 2010	48	36	5	7	75.00	
Málaga	5 November 2010	14 June 2013	129	53	30	46	41.09	
Manchester City	14 June 2013	30 June 2016	167	100	28	39	59.88	
Hebei China Fortune	27 August 2016	19 May 2018	52	21	12	19	40.38	
West Ham United	22 May 2018	28 December 2019	64	24	11	29	37.50	
Real Betis	9 July 2020	Present	329	157	89	83	47.72	
Total			1,628	778	399	451	47.79	

== Honours ==
=== Player ===
Universidad de Chile

- Copa Chile: 1979

=== Manager ===
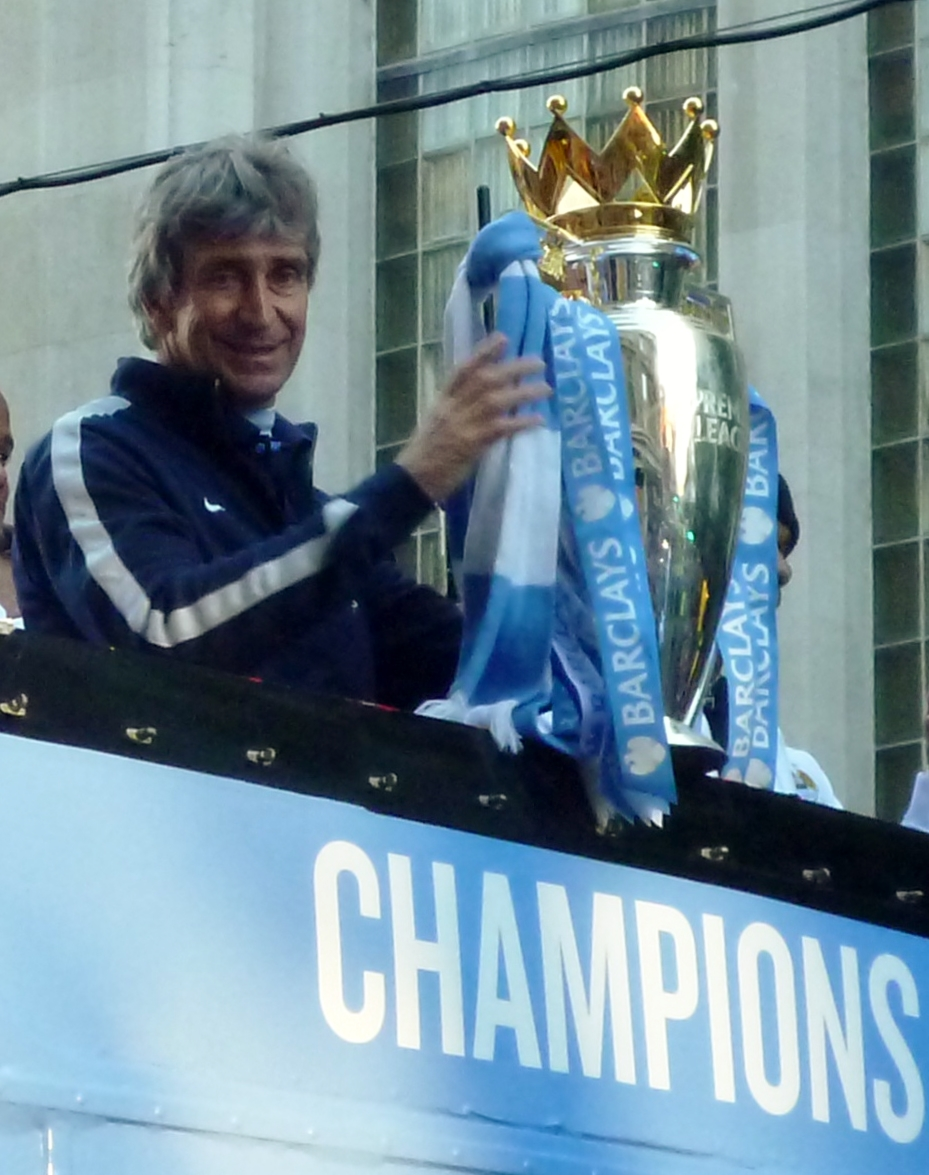
Pellegrini with the Premier League trophy on Manchester City's victory parade, May 2014

Universidad Católica

- Copa Chile: 1995
- Copa Interamericana: 1993

LDU Quito

- Serie A: 1999

San Lorenzo

- Primera División: 2000–01
- Copa Mercosur: 2001

River Plate

- Primera División: 2002–03

Villarreal

- UEFA Intertoto Cup: 2004

Manchester City

- Premier League: 2013–14
- Football League Cup: 2013–14, 2015–16

Real Betis

- Copa del Rey: 2021–22
- UEFA Conference League runner-up: 2024–25

Individual

- Miguel Muñoz Trophy: 2007–08, 2021–22
- Premier League Manager of the Month: December 2013, January 2014, December 2014, August 2015
- La Liga Manager of the Month: March 2025, February 2026
- Málaga Provincial Council: Gold Shield

== See also ==
- List of English football championship winning managers
- List of football managers with the most matches
- List of one-club men
