= Alcorconazo =

Alcorcón vs Real Madrid
- Event: 2009–10 Copa del Rey; Round of 32; First leg
| Alcorcón | Real Madrid |
| 4 | 0 |
- Date: 27 October 2009
- Venue: Estadio Santo Domingo, Alcorcón, Madrid, Spain
- Man of the Match: Borja Pérez (Alcorcón)
- Referee: Javier Turienzo Álvarez
- Attendance: 2,997

Alcorconazo is the name given by fans and by the Spanish sports press to the first leg of the 2009–10 Copa del Rey two-legged matchup between AD Alcorcón and Real Madrid in the round of 32, a 4–0 win by Alcorcón.

== Origin ==
The first leg received this name because of the defeat of Real Madrid, one of the largest clubs in Spanish football and in the world, by a modest Alcorcón team which then played in the third-tier Segunda División B.

=== Contrast between Real Madrid and Alcorcón ===
The two competing sides had significantly differing financial support.

The annual salaries of Alcorcón's matchday squad added up to less than €1 million, compared to the €110 million salary of Real Madrid's squad.

Real Madrid had spent €254 million on new signings the previous summer, out of a €420 million annual budget at the time.

On the day before the first leg of the cup-tie versus Alcorcón, one of Real Madrid's corporate sponsors gave the entire senior squad new cars worth a total of €2 million.

The average annual salary of an Alcorcón player at the time, €36,000, was less than Cristiano Ronaldo made in a day that season.

At the time of the match, Real Madrid's reserve side played in Segunda B alongside Alcorcón – and had lost only once in seven previous meetings between the two.

However, Ronaldo was not included in the squad for the match, along with several other stars who were rested. Adding insult to injury, the two Alcorcón goalscorers (Borja Pérez and Ernesto Gómez) were alumni of Real Madrid's youth academy.

== Match details ==
27 October 2009
22:00 CET

| Alcorcón | 4–0 | Real Madrid |
|---|---|---|
| Borja 16', 53'; Arbeloa 22' (o.g.); Ernesto 39' | Report |

Estadio Santo Domingo, Alcorcón
Attendance: 2,997
Referee: Javier Turienzo Álvarez (Castile and León)

Alcorcón
Real Madrid

| GK | 1 | (Spain) Juanma | (yellow card) 90+1' |
| RB | 24 | (Spain) Nagore | (yellow card) 7' |
| CB | 18 | (Spain) Íñigo López | (yellow card) 52' |
| CB | 20 | (Spain) Borja Gómez |
| LB | 16 | (Spain) Fernando Béjar | | (substituted off) 75' |
| RM | 17 | (Spain) Rubén Anuarbe |
| CM | 10 | (Spain) Sergio Mora |
| CM | 8 | (Spain) Rubén Sanz (c) |
| LM | 11 | (Spain) Ernesto Gómez | | (substituted off) 63' |
| SS | 14 | (Spain) Diego Cascón |
| CF | 22 | (Spain) Borja Pérez | | (substituted off) 81' |
Substitutions:
| GK | 13 | (Spain) Eladio |
| DF | 4 | (Spain) Mario Sánchez |
| FW | 9 | (Spain) Sergio Bravo | | (substituted on) 81' |
| FW | 19 | (Spain) Carmelo Yuste | | (substituted on) 73' |
| FW | 21 | (France) Jérémy Lempereur | | (substituted on) 63' |
Manager:
(Spain) Juan Antonio Anquela

| GK | 13 | (Poland) Jerzy Dudek |
| RB | 2 | (Spain) Álvaro Arbeloa |
| CB | 21 | (Germany) Christoph Metzelder |
| CB | 18 | (Spain) Raúl Albiol | (yellow card) 61' |
| LB | 15 | (Netherlands) Royston Drenthe |
| DM | 6 | (Mali) Mahamadou Diarra | (yellow card) 77' |
| RM | 24 | (Spain) Esteban Granero | | (substituted off) 61' |
| LM | 14 | (Spain) Guti | (yellow card) 43' | (substituted off) 45' |
| AM | 23 | (Netherlands) Rafael van der Vaart |
| CF | 11 | (France) Karim Benzema |
| CF | 7 | (Spain) Raúl (c) | | (substituted off) 71' |
Substitutions:
| GK | 26 | (Spain) Antonio Adán |
| DF | 12 | (Brazil) Marcelo | | (substituted on) 61' |
| DF | 19 | (Argentina) Ezequiel Garay |
| MF | 5 | (Argentina) Fernando Gago | | (substituted on) 45' |
| FW | 17 | (Netherlands) Ruud van Nistelrooy | | (substituted on) 71' |
Manager:
(Chile) Manuel Pellegrini

Man of the Match:
Borja Pérez (Alcorcón)

Assistant referees:
Luis Cote Sáez (Aragon)
Aurelio Asensio Rodríguez (Asturias)
Fourth official:
Rubén Gómez González (Castile and León)

== Overall score ==
| Team 1 | Agg. | Team 2 | 1st leg | 2nd leg |
|---|---|---|---|---|
| Alcorcón | 4–1 | Real Madrid | 4–0 | 0–1 |

== Legacy ==
This defeat was a lead sports story throughout Europe, being the title page in British, French and Italian publications.

It also marked a rise to relative prominence for the suburban Madrid club; in what may or may not have been a coincidence, Alcorcón began a major stadium renovation project the following month.

The half-time substitution of Guti when the score was 3–0 and when he was booked before was another topic in the Spanish press because of words exchanged between the player and his coach, Manuel Pellegrini.

It generated superstition and the number of the 4–0 day, 27 October 2009, (27,109) was one of the best-selling lottery tickets on Christmas 2009.

== Aftermath ==
While Real Madrid won the second leg at the Santiago Bernabeu, Alcorcón advanced victorious 4-1 on aggregate to the next round.

== See also ==
- 2009–10 Real Madrid CF season
