= 2009–10 in Spanish football =

The 2009–10 season was the 107th season of competitive football in Spain.

== Promotion and relegation (pre-season) ==
Teams promoted to 2009–10 La Liga

- Xerez CD
- Real Zaragoza
- CD Tenerife

Teams relegated from 2008–09 La Liga

- Real Betis
- CD Numancia
- Recreativo Huelva

Teams promoted to 2009–10 Segunda División

- Cádiz CF
- FC Cartagena
- Villarreal B
- Real Unión

Teams relegated from 2008–09 Segunda División

- CD Alavés
- Alicante CF
- SD Eibar
- Sevilla Atlético

Teams promoted to 2009–10 Segunda División B

- Gimnástica de Torrelavega
- Unión Estepona CF
- Villajoyosa CF
- CD Varea
- RCD Espanyol B
- Real Oviedo
- CD Toledo
- CF Palencia
- SD Compostela
- CD Izarra
- CD San Roque de Lepe
- RSD Alcalá
- AD Cerro Reyes
- CF Sporting Mahonés
- CP Cacereño
- Caravaca CF
- RCD Mallorca B
- CD Mirandés

Teams relegated from 2008–09 Segunda División B

- SD Ciudad de Santiago
- Deportivo B
- Real Sociedad B
- Real Valladolid B
- Marino de Luanco
- Lorca Deportiva CF
- Mérida UD
- UD Fuerteventura
- Las Palmas Atlético
- CDA Navalcarnero
- Pájara Playas
- CD Alfaro
- Villa Santa Brígida
- UD Alzira
- UD Ibiza-Eivissa
- Santa Eulàlia
- CD Atlético Baleares
- Antequera CF
- Real Balompédica Linense
- Racing Club Portuense

== National team ==
The home team is on the left column; the away team is on the right column.

=== World Cup qualifiers ===
Spain was in Group 5 of the 2010 FIFA World Cup qualification process.

6 September 2008
22:00 UTC+2

Spain	1 – 0	Bosnia and Herzegovina
Villa 58'	Report

Estadio Nueva Condomina, Murcia
Attendance: 29,152
Referee: Craig Thomson (Scotland)

10 September 2008
22:00 UTC+2

Spain	4 – 0	Armenia
Capdevila 7'; Villa 16', 79'; Senna 83'	Report

Estadio Carlos Belmonte, Albacete
Attendance: 16,996
Referee: Tony Asumaa (Finland)

11 October 2008
21:45 UTC+3

Estonia	0 – 3	Spain
	Report	Juanito 34'; Villa 38' (pen.); Puyol 69'

A. Le Coq Arena, Tallinn
Attendance: 9,200
Referee: Jonas Eriksson (Sweden)

15 October 2008
20:45 UTC+2

Belgium	1 – 2	Spain
Sonck 7'	Report	Iniesta 36'; Villa 88'

King Baudouin Stadium, Brussels
Attendance: 45,888
Referee: Tom Henning Øvrebø (Norway)

28 March 2009
22:00 UTC+1

Spain	1 – 0	Turkey
Piqué 60'	Report

Estadio Santiago Bernabéu, Madrid
Attendance: 73,820
Referee: Massimo Busacca (Switzerland)

1 April 2009
21:00 UTC+3

Turkey	1 – 2	Spain
Semih 26'	Report	Alonso 63' (pen.); Riera 90+2'

Ali Sami Yen Stadium, Istanbul
Attendance: 19,617
Referee: Mike Riley (England)

5 September 2009
22:00 UTC+2

Spain	5 – 0	Belgium
Silva 41', 67'; Villa 49', 85'; Piqué 50'	Report

Estadio Riazor, A Coruña
Attendance: 30,441
Referee: Bertrand Layec (France)

9 September 2009
22:00 UTC+2

Spain	3 – 0	Estonia
Fàbregas 33'; Cazorla 82'; Mata 90+2'	Report

Estadio Romano, Mérida
Attendance: 14,362
Referee: Oleh Oriekhov (Ukraine)

10 October 2009
21:00 UTC+5

Armenia	1 – 2	Spain
Arzumanyan 58'	Report	Fàbregas 33'; Mata 64' (pen.)

Hanrapetakan Stadium, Yerevan
Attendance: 10,500
Referee: Jiří Jech (Czech Republic)

14 October 2009
20:00 UTC+2

Bosnia and Herzegovina	2 – 5	Spain
Džeko 90'; Misimović 90+2'	Report	Piqué 13'; Silva 14'; Negredo 50', 55'; Mata 81'

Bilino Polje, Zenica
Attendance: 13,500
Referee: Konrad Plautz (Austria)

=== Friendly matches ===
12 August 2009

Macedonia	2 – 3	Spain
Pandev 9', 34'		52' Torres; 55' Piqué; 56' Riera

(North Macedonia) Philip II Arena, Skopje

14 November 2009

Spain	2 – 1	Argentina
Alonso 16', 86' (pen.)		61' (pen.) Messi

(Spain) Vicente Calderón, Madrid

18 November 2009

Austria	1 – 5	Spain
Jantscher 8'		10' Fàbregas; 20', 45' Villa; 56' Güiza; 57' Hernández

(Austria) Ernst-Happel, Vienna

3 March 2010
21:00 CET

France	0 – 2	Spain
		21' Villa; 46' Ramos

Stade de France, Saint-Denis, Paris

29 May 2010
18:00 CEST

Spain	3 – 2	Saudi Arabia
Villa 30'; Alonso 58'; Llorente 90+2'		16' Hawsawi; 74' Al-Sahlawi

(Austria) Tivoli Neu, Innsbruck

3 June 2010
18:00 CEST

Spain	1 – 0	South Korea
Navas 87'

(Austria) Tivoli Neu, Innsbruck
Referee: (Austria) Robert Schörgenhofer

8 June 2010
22:00 CEST

Spain	6 – 0	Poland
Villa 12'; Silva 14'; Alonso 51'; Fàbregas 57'; Torres 75'; Pedro 80'

(Spain) Nueva Condomina, Murcia
Referee: (Greece) Michail Koukoulakis

11 August 2010

Mexico	1 – 1	Spain
Hernández 12'		91' Silva

Estadio Azteca, Mexico City

== Honors ==
=== Trophy and League Champions ===
Competition	Winner	Details	At
La Liga	FC Barcelona	2009–10 La Liga. Beat Real Valladolid 4-0.	Camp Nou
Copa del Rey	Sevilla FC	2009–10 Copa del Rey. Beat Atlético Madrid 2-0.	Camp Nou
Copa Federación	CD San Roque de Lepe	2009–10 Copa Federación; Beat Lorca 1-0 and 2-0 agg.	Estadio Municipal de Lepe
Segunda División	Real Sociedad	2009–10 Segunda División. Beat Celta Vigo 2-0.	Estadio Anoeta
Segunda División B	Granada CF	Segunda División B	Los Cármenes
Supercopa de España	FC Barcelona	2009 Supercopa de España; Beat Athletic Bilbao 5–1 on agg. (2-1 away and 3-0 home)	Camp Nou

== League tables ==
=== La Liga ===
Pos	Team	Pld	W	D	L	GF	GA	GD	Pts	Qualification or relegation
1	Barcelona (C)	38	31	6	1	98	24	+74	99	Qualification for the Champions League group stage
2	Real Madrid	38	31	3	4	102	35	+67	96	Qualification for the Champions League group stage
3	Valencia	38	21	8	9	59	40	+19	71	Qualification for the Champions League group stage
4	Sevilla	38	19	6	13	65	49	+16	63	Qualification for the Champions League play-off round
5	Mallorca	38	18	8	12	59	44	+15	62 (Note: Mallorca could not qualify for the 2010–11 UEFA Europa League due to being immersed in a creditor contest, a situation against UEFA criteria. Then, Villarreal was invited to replace this spot.)	
6	Getafe	38	17	7	14	58	48	+10	58	Qualification for the Europa League play-off round
7	Villarreal	38	16	8	14	58	57	+1	56	Qualification for the Europa League play-off round
8	Athletic Bilbao	38	15	9	14	50	53	−3	54	
9	Atlético Madrid	38	13	8	17	57	61	−4	47 (Note: DEP 2–1 ATM; ATM 3–0 DEP)	Qualification for the Europa League group stage (Note: Since Atlético Madrid won the 2009–10 UEFA Europa League they earned a spot in the group stage of the 2010–11 UEFA Europa League.)
10	Deportivo La Coruña	38	13	8	17	35	49	−14	47	
11	Espanyol	38	11	11	16	29	46	−17	44	
12	Osasuna	38	11	10	17	37	46	−9	43	
13	Almería	38	10	12	16	43	55	−12	42	
14	Zaragoza	38	10	11	17	46	64	−18	41	
15	Sporting Gijón	38	9	13	16	36	51	−15	40	
16	Racing Santander	38	9	12	17	42	59	−17	39	
17	Málaga	38	7	16	15	42	48	−6	37	
18	Valladolid (R)	38	7	15	16	37	62	−25	36 (Note: VLD 3–3 TEN; TEN 0–0 VLD. As the aggregate score is a draw (3–3), the team with the higher goal difference between these two teams qualifies first and over the other one (Valladolid 18th, with −25; Tenerife 19th with −34))	Relegation to the Segunda División
19	Tenerife (R)	38	9	9	20	40	74	−34	36	Relegation to the Segunda División
20	Xerez (R)	38	8	10	20	38	66	−28	34	Relegation to the Segunda División

Source: LFP and Yahoo! Sport
Rules for classification: 1) points; 2) head-to-head points; 3) head-to-head goal difference; 4) head-to-head goals scored; 5) goal difference; 6) number of goals scored.
(C) Champions; (R) Relegated

=== Segunda División ===
Pos	Team	Pld	W	D	L	GF	GA	GD	Pts	Promotion or relegation
1	Real Sociedad (C, P)	42	20	14	8	53	37	+16	74	Promotion to La Liga
2	Hércules (P)	42	19	14	9	61	34	+27	71 (Note: HÉR: 7 pts; LEV: 6 pts; BET: 4 pts)	Promotion to La Liga
3	Levante (P)	42	19	14	9	63	45	+18	71	Promotion to La Liga
4	Betis	42	19	14	9	61	38	+23	71	
5	Cartagena	42	18	11	13	58	49	+9	65	
6	Elche	42	18	9	15	67	57	+10	63	
7	Villarreal B	42	16	13	13	60	56	+4	61	
8	Numancia	42	16	11	15	55	53	+2	59	
9	Recreativo	42	14	15	13	40	42	−2	57	
10	Córdoba	42	14	13	15	40	46	−6	55	
11	Rayo Vallecano	42	13	14	15	67	58	+9	53	
12	Celta de Vigo	42	13	13	16	38	44	−6	52 (Note: CEL: 13 pts; HUE: 12 pts; GIR: 11 pts; ALB: 9 pts; SAL: 8 pts)	
13	Huesca	42	12	16	14	36	40	−4	52	
14	Girona	42	13	13	16	45	59	−14	52	
15	Albacete	42	12	16	14	60	62	−2	52	
16	Salamanca	42	13	13	16	44	54	−10	52	
17	Las Palmas	42	12	15	15	49	49	0	51 (Note: GIM 2–1 LPA; LPA 1–0 GIM)	
18	Gimnàstic	42	14	9	19	42	55	−13	51	
19	Cádiz (R)	42	12	14	16	49	64	−15	50 (Note: MUR 2–2 CAD; CAD 1–0 MUR)	Relegation to Segunda División B
20	Murcia (R)	42	11	17	14	49	51	−2	50	Relegation to Segunda División B
21	Real Unión (R)	42	12	10	20	40	59	−19	46	Relegation to Segunda División B
22	Castellón (R)	42	7	12	23	37	62	−25	33	Relegation to Segunda División B

Source: LFP – Liga Adelante
Rules for classification: 1st points; 2nd head-to-head points; 3rd head-to-head goal difference; 4th head-to-head goals scored; 5th goal difference; 6th number of goals scored; 7th Fair-play points
(C) Champions; (P) Promoted; (R) Relegated
