= CD Bezana =

Association football club in Spain

Coordinates: 43.440257°N 3.903481°W

Bezana
- Full name: Centro Deportivo Bezana
- Founded: 1970
- Ground: Campo Municipal, Bezana, Cantabria, Spain
- Capacity: 3,500
- Chairman: Agustín Palomera
- Manager: José Moratón
- League: Tercera Federación – Group 3
- 2025–26: Tercera Federación – Group 3, 10th of 18
Home colours	Away colours

Centro Deportivo Bezana is a Spanish football team based in Santa Cruz de Bezana, in the autonomous community of Cantabria. Founded in 1970 it plays in Tercera Federación – Group 3, holding home games at Campo de Fútbol Municipal de Bezana, which has a capacity of 3,500 spectators.

== History ==
In the 2018-19 season the club finished close to the top of the Tercera División, Group 3, in the 6th position among 20 teams.

== Season to season ==
Season	Tier	Division	Place	Copa del Rey
1972–73	6	2ª Reg.	6th	
1973–74	6	2ª Reg.	5th	
1974–75	5	1ª Reg.	17th	
1975–76	6	2ª Reg.	6th	
1976–77	5	1ª Reg.	17th	
1977–78	7	2ª Reg.	4th	
1978–79	6	1ª Reg.	11th	
1979–80	6	1ª Reg.	15th	
1980–81	6	1ª Reg.	20th	
1981–82	7	2ª Reg.	10th	
1982–83	7	2ª Reg.	6th	
1983–84	6	1ª Reg.	19th	
1984–85	7	2ª Reg.	4th	
1985–86	6	1ª Reg.	15th	
1986–87	6	1ª Reg.	11th	
1987–88	6	1ª Reg.	3rd	
1988–89	5	Reg. Pref.	17th	
1989–90	5	Reg. Pref.	17th	
1990–91	5	Reg. Pref.	14th	
1991–92	5	Reg. Pref.	1st	

Season	Tier	Division	Place	Copa del Rey
1992–93	5	Reg. Pref.	3rd	
1993–94	4	3ª	16th	
1994–95	4	3ª	2nd	
1995–96	4	3ª	11th	
1996–97	4	3ª	3rd	
1997–98	4	3ª	10th	
1998–99	4	3ª	4th	
1999–2000	4	3ª	9th	
2000–01	4	3ª	4th	
2001–02	4	3ª	4th	
2002–03	4	3ª	5th	
2003–04	4	3ª	3rd	
2004–05	4	3ª	6th	
2005–06	4	3ª	3rd	
2006–07	4	3ª	4th	
2007–08	4	3ª	7th	
2008–09	4	3ª	5th	
2009–10	4	3ª	4th	
2010–11	4	3ª	5th	
2011–12	4	3ª	15th	

Season	Tier	Division	Place	Copa del Rey
2012–13	4	3ª	13th	
2013–14	4	3ª	12th	
2014–15	4	3ª	15th	
2015–16	4	3ª	15th	
2016–17	4	3ª	12th	
2017–18	4	3ª	16th	
2018–19	4	3ª	6th	
2019–20	4	3ª	7th	
2020–21	4	3ª	9th / 7th	
2021–22	6	Reg. Pref.	5th	
2022–23	6	Reg. Pref.	3rd	
2023–24	5	3ª Fed.	7th	
2024–25	5	3ª Fed.	7th	
2025–26	5	3ª Fed.	10th	
2026–27	5	3ª Fed.		

- 28 seasons in Tercera División
- 4 seasons in Tercera Federación
