= Borja Pérez =

Spanish footballer (born 1982)

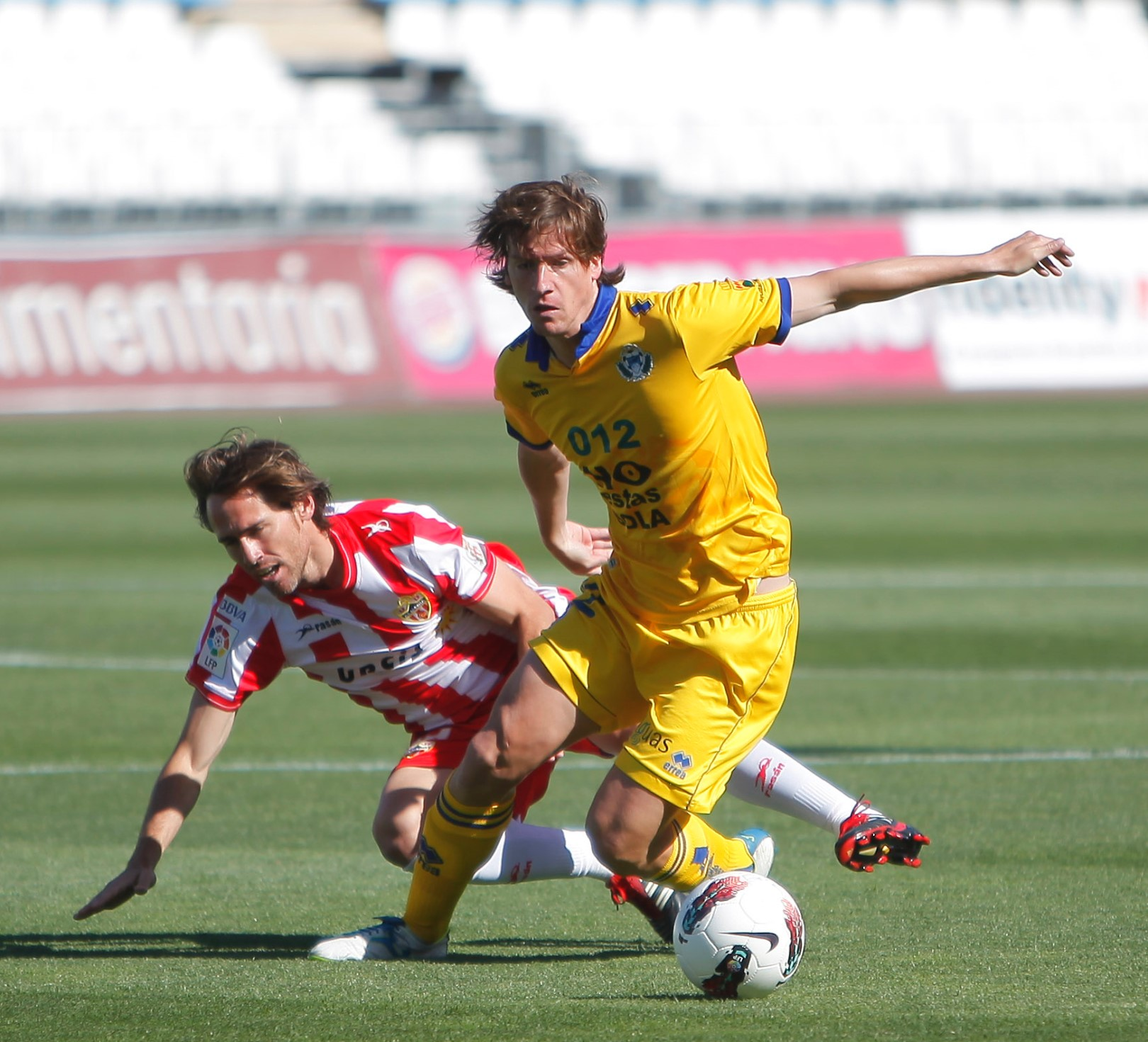
- Borja (right) on the ball for Alcorcón in 2012

Personal information
- Full name: Francisco de Borja Pérez-Peñas Díaz-Mauriño
- Date of birth: 1 April 1982 (age 44)
- Place of birth: Madrid, Spain
- Height: 1.83 m (6 ft 0 in)
- Position: Forward

Youth career
- Real Madrid
- Santa María Pilar
- Leganés

Senior career*
Years	Team	Apps	(Gls)
2001–2003	Leganés B		
2003–2005	Leganés	71	(18)
2005–2007	Valladolid B	35	(12)
2006–2007	→ Alicante (loan)	28	(12)
2007–2009	Alicante	50	(9)
2009–2012	Alcorcón	100	(18)
2012–2013	Kilmarnock	28	(4)
2013–2014	Tenerife	11	(0)
2014–2015	Fuenlabrada	34	(6)
2015–2016	SS Reyes	31	(2)
Total		388	(81)
- * Club domestic league appearances and goals

Francisco de Borja Pérez-Peñas Díaz-Mauriño (born 1 April 1982), known as Borja, is a Spanish former professional footballer who played as a forward.

He made 129 Segunda División appearances and scored 14 goals, for Leganés, Alicante, Alcorcón and Tenerife. He added 185 games and 60 goals in the Segunda División B for five teams, and played one season for Kilmarnock in the Scottish Premier League.

== Club career ==
=== Early years and Alcorcón ===
Borja was born in Madrid. After a brief passage at Real Madrid's academy, he made his senior debut with neighbours CD Leganés, scoring five goals in 37 games in an eventual 2004 relegation from Segunda División; his first was on 30 November 2003, when he opened an eventual 1–3 home loss against Sporting de Gijón.

Borja moved to Real Valladolid in summer 2005, but could only appear for its reserves during his spell, being loaned to Alicante CF in his second year and being subsequently released. He joined the same team permanently – still in the Segunda División B – helping to promotion in his third season.

In the 2009 off-season, following Alicante's relegation, Borja stayed in the third division, joining AD Alcorcón. On 27 October, he scored twice against Real Madrid in the Copa del Rey in a final 4–0 home win, taking his tally against this club to six (he had netted already four times in different editions of the tournament); Alcorcón won 4–1 on aggregate.

=== Kilmarnock ===
On 16 August 2012, it was announced that Borja had signed for Scottish Premier League side Kilmarnock on a one-year deal, after spending some weeks on trial. He made his debut two days later, coming on as a substitute in a 1–2 home loss to Motherwell.

Borja's first goal came from a penalty to give his team a 2–0 lead in an eventual 3–1 victory over Dundee United, also at Rugby Park.

=== Later career ===
In May 2013, Borja extended his contract with the East Ayrshire club until 2015. Kilmarnock changed manager the following month however, and, in August, he returned to his country after transferring to CD Tenerife.

Having gone scoreless in his season in the Canary Islands, Borja played out the last two years of his career with smaller teams in his native region, CF Fuenlabrada (third tier) and UD San Sebastián de los Reyes (Tercera División).

== Personal life ==
In a 2012 interview, Borja revealed he had a law degree and a Master's degree in order to become a lawyer.
