= Íñigo López (footballer) =

Spanish footballer (born 1982)

Personal information
- Full name: Íñigo López Montaña
- Date of birth: 23 July 1982 (age 44)
- Place of birth: Logroño, Spain
- Height: 1.85 m (6 ft 1 in)
- Position: Centre-back

Youth career
- Las Rozas

Senior career*
| Years | Team | Apps | (Gls) |
| 2002–2004 | Las Rozas | | |
| 2004–2006 | Atlético Madrid B | 34 | (4) |
| 2006–2007 | S.S. Reyes | 27 | (1) |
| 2007–2010 | Alcorcón | 85 | (17) |
| 2010–2013 | Granada | 91 | (8) |
| 2013–2014 | PAOK | 3 | (0) |
| 2014 | → Celta (loan) | 9 | (1) |
| 2014–2015 | Córdoba | 21 | (0) |
| 2015–2018 | Huesca | 63 | (3) |
| 2018–2019 | Extremadura | 7 | (0) |
| 2019 | Deportivo La Coruña | 1 | (0) |
| 2019–2020 | S.S. Reyes | 7 | (0) |
| Total | | 348 | (34) |
- * Club domestic league appearances and goals

Íñigo López Montaña (born 23 July 1982) is a Spanish former professional footballer who played as a central defender.

== Club career ==
Born in Logroño, La Rioja, López began his career with Atlético Madrid B in the Segunda División B in 2004, going on to spend six seasons in that tier, his next club being Madrid neighbours UD San Sebastián de los Reyes. In 2007, he signed for AD Alcorcón also in the community, appearing in 35 league games in his first year (five goals) but only five in the following.

López was again a regular starter for Alcorcón in 2009–10, and scored a career-best seven goals as the team promoted to Segunda División for the first time ever. He also took part in the memorable Alcorconazo in the round of 32 of the Copa del Rey, in which the club secured the most famous victory in its history after defeating Real Madrid 4–0 at home and 4–1 on aggregate.

In the summer of 2010, López joined Granada CF in the second division, and achieved a second consecutive promotion, also the second in a row for the Andalusians, while contributing four goals. He made his La Liga debut on 1 October 2011 in a 1–0 away loss against Valencia CF, and netted four times during the season – two of those in narrow wins over Athletic Bilbao (1–0, away) and Málaga CF (2–1, at home)– to help the side to retain their league status.

López moved abroad for the first time on 19 June 2013, with the 30-year-old signing a two-year contract with PAOK FC from the Super League Greece. He returned to Spain on 23 January of the following year, after being loaned to RC Celta de Vigo for five months.

On 1 August 2014, López agreed to a one-year deal at Córdoba CF, recently promoted to the top flight. He played 21 matches as his team were immediately relegated, and signed for SD Huesca in the second tier on 14 July 2015.

López helped to achieve promotion to the top division in the 2017–18 campaign, but contributed just four appearances to this feat. He subsequently terminated his contract, and signed a one-year deal with Extremadura UD in the same league after having trained with them since August.

On 31 January 2019, free agent López moved to division two side Deportivo de La Coruña on a six-month deal.

== Personal life ==
López's older brother, Jorge, was also a footballer.
