= José Moratón =

Spanish footballer

Personal information
- Full name: José Moratón Taeño
- Date of birth: 14 July 1979 (age 47)
- Place of birth: Santander, Spain
- Height: 1.86 m (6 ft 1 in)
- Position: Centre-back

Team information
- Current team: Racing Santander (assistant)

Youth career
- 1993–1997: Racing Santander

Senior career*
Years	Team	Apps	(Gls)
1997–2001	Racing B		
1998–2010	Racing Santander	187	(4)
2010–2011	Salamanca	33	(5)
Total		220+	(9+)

Managerial career
- 2011–2012: Racing Santander (youth)
- 2016–2018: Racing B
- 2018–2020: Bezana
- 2020–2021: Escobedo
- 2022–2023: Laredo (assistant)
- 2025–: Racing Santander (assistant)
- * Club domestic league appearances and goals

José Moratón Taeño (born 14 July 1979) is a Spanish former professional footballer who played as a central defender. He is currently assistant manager of La Liga club Racing de Santander.

He represented mainly Racing de Santander in a 14-year senior career, appearing in 155 La Liga matches over nine seasons for the club and scoring three goals.

== Playing career ==
=== Racing Santander ===
Moratón was born in Santander, Cantabria. Since first appearing for his hometown club Racing de Santander on 13 December 1998, in a 0–0 La Liga home draw against Tenerife, he all but stayed connected to it during his career. During 2001–02's Segunda División, at the Campos de Sport de El Sardinero, he scored a decisive goal against Atlético Madrid as his team returned to the top flight after just one year out.

Already established as one of the squad's captains, Moratón suffered a severe injury which made him miss most of 2006–07. He played 18 games the following season, as the side achieved a first-ever qualification for the UEFA Europa League.

In the following two top-division campaigns, Moratón was used exclusively as a backup, but still totalled 23 matches as Racing managed to retain their league status. He also helped them to reach the semi-finals of the Copa del Rey, notably netting in a 3–2 win at Alcorcón (whom had previously ousted Real Madrid), also the final aggregate score– precisely in the last-four stage, he scored in his own net against Atlético Madrid in an insufficient 3–2 home victory and 6–3 overall loss.

Moratón was released by the club in June 2010, ending a relationship spanning nearly two decades.

=== Salamanca ===
Moratón played in 2010–11 with Salamanca in the second tier, starting all the matches he appeared in and scoring a career-best five goals. In early June 2011, however, following his team's relegation, the 32-year-old chose to retire from professional football.

== Coaching career ==
Moratón began his managerial career with Racing Santander, firstly being in charge of their youth team and later of the senior reserve one. From 2018 to 2021, he served as head coach at Bezana and Escobedo, both clubs from his region of birth and competing in the Tercera División.

On 24 May 2022, Moratón was appointed assistant manager at fellow Cantabrians Laredo. He returned to Racing subsequently, initially working as youth system coordinator alongside his former teammate Gonzalo Colsa and being promoted to assistant coach in the first team under José Alberto in summer 2025.

== Managerial statistics ==
As of 15 May 2021

Managerial record by team and tenure
Team	Nat	From	To	Record								Ref
Team	Nat	From	To	G	W	D	L	GF	GA	GD	Win %	Ref
Racing B	(Spain)	17 June 2016	30 May 2018	76	42	16	18	127	74	+53	55.26	
Bezana	(Spain)	30 May 2018	23 May 2020	66	33	13	20	103	77	+26	50.00	
Escobedo	(Spain)	23 May 2020	27 May 2021	26	13	5	8	34	25	+9	50.00	
Total				168	88	34	46	264	176	+88	52.38	—
