= 2009–10 Copa del Rey =

108th Copa del Rey

Tournament details
- Country: Spain
- Teams: 83

Final positions
- Champions: Sevilla (5th title)
- Runners-up: Atlético Madrid

Tournament statistics
- Matches played: 112
- Goals scored: 286 (2.55 per match)
- Top goal scorer(s): Maxi Rodríguez (5 goals)

The 2009–10 Copa del Rey was the 108th staging of the Copa del Rey (including two seasons where two rival editions were played). The competition began on 22 August 2009 and concluded on 19 May 2010 with the final held at the Camp Nou in Barcelona, in which Sevilla lifted the trophy for the fifth time in their history with a 2–0 victory over Atlético Madrid. The defending cup holders were Barcelona, but they were eliminated by Sevilla in the round of 16.

This tournament had quite a number of notable upsets, including Barcelona's early exit in the round of 16, and Real Madrid's shocking 4–0 loss to Alcorcón, which was subsequently nicknamed the "Alcorconazo" and contributed to Real Madrid's early exit in the round of 32.

== Qualified teams ==
The following teams competed in the Copa del Rey 2009–10:

20 teams of 2008–09 La Liga:

- Almería
- Athletic Bilbao
- Atlético Madrid
- Barcelona
- Betis
- Deportivo
- Espanyol
- Getafe
- Málaga
- Mallorca
- Numancia
- Osasuna
- Racing Santander
- Real Madrid
- Recreativo
- Sevilla
- Sporting Gijón
- Valencia
- Valladolid
- Villarreal

21 teams of 2008–09 Segunda División (Sevilla Atlético were excluded for being a reserve team of Sevilla):

- Alavés
- Albacete
- Alicante
- Castellón
- Celta
- Córdoba
- Eibar
- Elche
- Gimnàstic
- Girona
- Hércules
- Huesca
- Las Palmas
- Levante
- Murcia
- Rayo Vallecano
- Real Sociedad
- Salamanca
- Tenerife
- Xerez
- Zaragoza

24 teams of 2008–09 Segunda División B. Teams that qualified were the top five teams of each of the 4 groups (excluding reserve teams) and the four with the highest number of points out of the remaining non-reserve teams (*):

- Real Unión
- Cultural Leonesa
- Ponferradina
- Zamora
- Lemona
- Cartagena
- Lorca Deportiva
- Alcorcón
- Leganés
- Mérida
- Alcoyano
- Sant Andreu
- Sabadell
- Ontinyent
- Gramenet
- Cádiz
- Real Jaén
- Poli Ejido
- Marbella
- Puertollano
- Atlético Ciudad*
- Conquense*
- Ceuta*
- Melilla*

18 teams of 2008–09 Tercera División. Teams that qualified were the champions of each of the 18 groups (or at least the ones with the highest number of points within their group since reserve teams were excluded):

- Compostela
- Real Oviedo
- Gimnástica
- Lagun Onak
- Reus Deportiu
- Villajoyosa
- Alcalá
- Palencia
- Unión Estepona
- San Roque
- Sporting Mahonés
- Tenisca
- Caravaca
- Cerro Reyes
- Izarra
- Logroñés
- Monzón
- Toledo

== First round ==
The matches were played on 22, 25, 26 and 27 August 2009.

| Team 1 | Score | Team 2 |
|---|---|---|
| San Roque | 1–2 | Melilla |
| Villajoyosa | 2–0 | Logroñés |
| Lagun Onak | 2–1 | Izarra |
| Alcalá | 0–1 | Real Oviedo |
| Compostela | 1–2 | Zamora |
| Lemona | 2–2 (2–4 p) | Cultural Leonesa |
| Gramenet | 0–3 | Sant Andreu |
| Sabadell | 2–0 | Monzón |
| Real Jaén | 0–1 | Unión Estepona |
| Marbella | 1–0 | Caravaca |
| Alavés | 1–1 (1–4 p) | Palencia |
| Ponferradina | 1–1 (5–4 p) | Eibar |
| Leganés | 1–3 | Reus |
| Puertollano | 3–1 (aet) | Gimnástica |
| Tenisca | 2–4 | Cerro Reyes |
| Alicante | 1–1 (5–4 p) | Sporting Mahonés |
| Conquense | 1–0 (aet) | Toledo |
| Lorca Deportiva | 1–2 (aet) | Ceuta |

Alcorcón, Alcoyano, Atlético Ciudad, Mérida, Ontinyent and Poli Ejido received a bye.

== Second round ==
The matches were played on 1, 2, 3, 9 and 16 September 2009.

| Team 1 | Score | Team 2 |
|---|---|---|
| Celta | 2–1 | Real Unión |
| Lagun Onak | 2–1 | Cerro Reyes |
| Sant Andreu | 3–1 | Melilla |
| Cultural Leonesa | 4–0 | Unión Estepona |
| Girona | 1–0 | Gimnàstic |
| Real Sociedad | 0–2 | Rayo Vallecano |
| Betis | 1–2 | Córdoba |
| Ontinyent | 2–1 | Conquense |
| Alcorcón | 2–0 | Palencia |
| Atlético Ciudad | 3–2 | Real Oviedo |
| Alcoyano | 2–0 | Villajoyosa |
| Puertollano | 3–0 | Zamora |
| Albacete | 0–1 | Hércules |
| Sabadell | 0–0 (1–3 p) | Marbella |
| Salamanca | 1–1 (4–3 p) | Castellón |
| Levante | 0–0 (3–4 p) | Huesca |
| Las Palmas | 2–1 | Cádiz |
| Poli Ejido | 0–0 (8–7 p) | Ponferradina |
| Cartagena | 3–2 (aet) | Elche |
| Numancia | 2–3 | Murcia |
| Ceuta | 2–2 (4–5 p) | Alicante |
| Mérida | 1–1 (5–4 p) | Reus |

Recreativo received a bye.

== Third round ==
The matches were played on 7 October 2009.

| Team 1 | Score | Team 2 |
|---|---|---|
| Lagun Onak | 1–2 | Alcorcón |
| Puertollano | 2–1 | Sant Andreu |
| Salamanca | 2–0 | Cartagena |
| Girona | 1–3 | Celta |
| Hércules | 2–0 | Huesca |
| Mérida | 1–3 | Alcoyano |
| Recreativo | 2–1 | Las Palmas |
| Marbella | 2–1 | Alicante |
| Córdoba | 0–1 | Rayo Vallecano |
| Atlético Ciudad | 0–0 (5–4 p) | Poli Ejido |
| Ontinyent | 0–0 (3–5 p) | Cultural Leonesa |

Real Murcia received a bye.

== Final phase bracket ==
Teams that are listed first play at home in the first leg.

Round of 32; 27/28/29 October 2009; 10/11/12 November 2009
Alcoyano | 0 | 2 | 2
Valencia | 1 | 2 | 3
Real Murcia | 0 | 0 | 0
Deportivo | 1 | 0 | 1
Cultural Leonesa | 0 | 0 | 0
Barcelona | 2 | 5 | 7
Atlético Ciudad | 2 | 1 | 3
Sevilla | 4 | 5 | 9
Rayo Vallecano | 2 | 2 | 4
Athletic Bilbao | 0 | 2 | 2
Valladolid | 2 | 0 | 2
Mallorca (a) | 1 | 1 | 2
Zaragoza | 1 | 0 | 1
Málaga (a) | 1 | 0 | 1
Getafe | 2 | 1 | 3
Espanyol | 0 | 1 | 1
Recreativo (p) | 1 | 1 | 2
Sporting de Gijón | 1 | 1 | 2
Marbella | 0 | 0 | 0
Atlético Madrid | 2 | 6 | 8
Celta | 2 | 1 | 3
Tenerife | 1 | 0 | 1
Puertollano | 1 | 0 | 1
Villarreal | 1 | 1 | 2
Alcorcón | 4 | 0 | 4
Real Madrid | 0 | 1 | 1
Salamanca | 1 | 1 | 2
Racing Santander | 0 | 4 | 4
Hércules | 2 | 1 | 3
Almería | 1 | 0 | 1
Xerez | 1 | 0 | 1
Osasuna | 2 | 1 | 3

Round of 16; 5/6/7 January 2010; 12/13/14 January 2010
Valencia | 1 | 2 | 3
Deportivo | 2 | 2 | 4
Barcelona | 1 | 1 | 2
Sevilla (a) | 2 | 0 | 2
Rayo Vallecano | 2 | 1 | 3
Mallorca | 1 | 3 | 4
Málaga | 2 | 1 | 3
Getafe | 1 | 5 | 6
Recreativo | 3 | 1 | 4
Atlético Madrid | 0 | 5 | 5
Celta | 1 | 1 | 2
Villarreal | 1 | 0 | 1
Alcorcón | 2 | 0 | 2
Racing Santander | 3 | 0 | 3
Hércules | 2 | 0 | 2
Osasuna (a) | 1 | 1 | 2

Quarterfinals; 20/21 January 2010; 27/28 January 2010
Deportivo | 0 | 1 | 1
Sevilla | 3 | 0 | 3
Mallorca | 1 | 1 | 2
Getafe (a) | 2 | 0 | 2
Atlético Madrid | 1 | 1 | 2
Celta | 1 | 0 | 1
Racing Santander | 2 | 3 | 5
Osasuna | 1 | 0 | 1

Semifinals; 3/4 February 2010; 10/11 February 2010
Sevilla | 2 | 0 | 2
Getafe | 0 | 1 | 1
Atlético Madrid | 4 | 2 | 6
Racing Santander | 0 | 3 | 3

Final; 19 May 2010
Sevilla | 2
Atlético Madrid | 0

== Round of 32 ==
The first leg matches were played on 27, 28 and 29 October while the second legs were played on 10, 11 and 12 November 2009.

| Team 1 | Agg. | Team 2 | 1st leg | 2nd leg |
|---|---|---|---|---|
| Marbella | 0–8 | Atlético Madrid | 0–2 | 0–6 |
| Alcoyano | 2–3 | Valencia | 0–1 | 2–2 |
| Puertollano | 1–2 | Villarreal | 1–1 | 0–1 |
| Atlético Ciudad | 3–9 | Sevilla | 2–4 | 1–5 |
| Alcorcón | 4–1 | Real Madrid | 4–0 | 0–1 |
| Celta Vigo | 3–1 | Tenerife | 2–1 | 1–0 |
| Real Murcia | 0–1 | Deportivo La Coruña | 0–1 | 0–0 |
| Xerez | 1–3 | Osasuna | 1–2 | 0–1 |
| Zaragoza | 1–1 (a) | Málaga | 1–1 | 0–0 |
| Recreativo | 2–2 (4–2 p) | Sporting de Gijón | 1–1 | 1–1 |
| Cultural Leonesa | 0–7 | Barcelona | 0–2 | 0–5 |
| Getafe | 3–1 | Espanyol | 2–0 | 1–1 |
| Valladolid | 2–2 (a) | Mallorca | 2–1 | 0–1 |
| Rayo Vallecano | 4–2 | Athletic Bilbao | 2–0 | 2–2 |
| Salamanca | 2–4 | Racing Santander | 1–0 | 1–4 |
| Hércules | 3–1 | Almería | 2–1 | 1–0 |

== Round of 16 ==
The first leg matches were played on 5, 6 and 7 January while the second legs were played on 12, 13 and 14 January 2010.

| Team 1 | Agg. | Team 2 | 1st leg | 2nd leg |
|---|---|---|---|---|
| Celta | 2–1 | Villarreal | 1–1 | 1–0 |
| Alcorcón | 2–3 | Racing Santander | 2–3 | 0–0 |
| Hércules | 2–2 (a) | Osasuna | 2–1 | 0–1 |
| Valencia | 3–4 | Deportivo | 1–2 | 2–2 |
| Málaga | 3–6 | Getafe | 2–1 | 1–5 |
| Barcelona | 2–2 (a) | Sevilla | 1–2 | 1–0 |
| Rayo Vallecano | 3–4 | Mallorca | 2–1 | 1–3 |
| Recreativo | 4–5 | Atlético Madrid | 3–0 | 1–5 |

=== First legs ===
| 5 January 2010 | Barcelona | 1–2 | Sevilla | Barcelona |
| 22:00 CET | Ibrahimović 74' | Report | Capel 60'; Negredo 75' (pen.) | Stadium: Camp Nou; Attendance: 20,000; Referee: Bernardino González Vázquez |

| 6 January 2010 | Celta | 1–1 | Villarreal | Vigo |
| 18:00 CET | Arthuro 44' | Report | Rossi 12' | Stadium: Balaídos; Attendance: 9,500; Referee: Javier Turienzo Álvarez |

| 6 January 2010 | Alcorcón | 2–3 | Racing Santander | Alcorcón |
| 20:00 CET | I. López 57'; B. Gómez 87' | Report | Christian 31'; Geijo 47'; Moratón 62' | Stadium: Santo Domingo; Attendance: 3,000; Referee: Rafael Ramírez Domínguez |

| 6 January 2010 | Recreativo | 3–0 | Atlético Madrid | Huelva |
| 22:00 CET | Fornaroli 14'; Barrales 25' (pen.); Candeias 88' | Report | | Stadium: Nuevo Colombino; Attendance: 2,500; Referee: José González González |

| 6 January 2010 | Valencia | 1–2 | Deportivo | Valencia |
| 20:00 CET | Silva 72' | Report | Guardado 47'; Álvarez 57' | Stadium: Mestalla; Attendance: 25,000; Referee: Carlos Velasco Carballo |

| 7 January 2010 | Málaga | 2–1 | Getafe | Málaga |
| 22:00 CET | Apoño 10'; Edinho 44' | Report | Stepanov 67' (o.g.) | Stadium: La Rosaleda; Attendance: 8,000; Referee: César Muñiz Fernández |

| 7 January 2010 | Rayo Vallecano | 2–1 | Mallorca | Madrid |
| 20:00 CET | Michel 16'; Collantes 43' | Report | Álvarez 21' | Stadium: Teresa Rivero; Attendance: 6,000; Referee: Miguel Ángel Pérez Lasa |

| 7 January 2010 | Hércules | 2–1 | Osasuna | Alicante |
| 20:00 CET | Cristian 17'; Del Olmo 67' | Report | Galán 51' | Stadium: Rico Pérez; Attendance: 5,000; Referee: José Paradas Romero |

=== Second legs ===
| 12 January 2010 | Villarreal | 0–1 (1–2 agg.) | Celta | Villarreal |
| 21:00 CET | | Report | Trashorras 90' (pen.) | Stadium: El Madrigal; Attendance: 7,000; Referee: David Fernández Borbalán |

| 13 January 2010 | Sevilla | 0–1 (2–2 agg.) | Barcelona | Seville |
| 22:00 CET | | Report | Xavi 64' | Stadium: Ramón Sánchez Pizjuán; Attendance: 45,000; Referee: Carlos Clos Gómez |

| 13 January 2010 | Racing Santander | 0–0 (3–2 agg.) | Alcorcón | Santander |
| 20:00 CET | | Report | | Stadium: El Sardinero; Attendance: 12,000; Referee: Bernardino González Vázquez |

| 13 January 2010 | Deportivo | 2–2 (4–3 agg.) | Valencia | A Coruña |
| 20:00 CET | Filipe Luís 50'; J. Rodríguez 72' | Report | Žigić 11', 29' | Stadium: Riazor; Attendance: 20,000; Referee: Manuel Mejuto González |

| 13 January 2010 | Osasuna | 1–0 (2–2 agg.) | Hércules | Pamplona |
| 20:00 CET | Masoud 48' | Report | | Stadium: El Sadar; Attendance: 4,000; Referee: Fernando Teixeira Vitienes |

| 13 January 2010 | Getafe | 5–1 (6–3 agg.) | Málaga | Getafe |
| 22:00 CET | Soldado 14', 49'; Rafa 30'; Pedro León 54' | Report | Juanmi 62' | Stadium: Coliseum Alfonso Pérez; Attendance: 2,000; Referee: Antonio Mateu Lahoz |

| 14 January 2010 | Atlético Madrid | 5–1 (5–4 agg.) | Recreativo | Madrid |
| 22:00 CET | Simão 22', 83'; Agüero 24', 63'; Ujfaluši 40' | Report | Carmona 71' | Stadium: Vicente Calderón Stadium; Attendance: 28,000; Referee: Carlos Delgado Ferreiro |

| 14 January 2010 | Mallorca | 3–1 (4–3 agg.) | Rayo Vallecano | Palma |
| 20:00 CET | Víctor 51', 61'; Suárez 90' | Report | Piti 45' | Stadium: ONO Estadi; Attendance: 5,000; Referee: Javier Estrada Fernández |

== Quarter-finals ==
| Team 1 | Agg. | Team 2 | 1st leg | 2nd leg |
|---|---|---|---|---|
| Mallorca | 2–2 (a) | Getafe | 1–2 | 1–0 |
| Deportivo La Coruña | 1–3 | Sevilla | 0–3 | 1–0 |
| Racing Santander | 5–1 | Osasuna | 2–1 | 3–0 |
| Atlético Madrid | 2–1 | Celta Vigo | 1–1 | 1–0 |

=== First legs ===
| 20 January 2010 | Mallorca | 1–2 | Getafe | Palma |
| 20:00 CET | Castro 90+2' | Report | Manu 50'; Miku 68' | Stadium: ONO Estadi; Attendance: 11,000; Referee: Alfonso Pérez Burrull |

| 20 January 2010 | Deportivo La Coruña | 0–3 | Sevilla | A Coruña |
| 22:00 CET | | Report | Negredo 26'; Renato 67'; Navas 69' | Stadium: Riazor; Attendance: 14,000; Referee: Eduardo Iturralde González |

| 21 January 2010 | Racing Santander | 2–1 | Osasuna | Santander |
| 20:00 CET | Colsa 63'; Diop 84' | Report | Pandiani 88' | Stadium: El Sardinero; Attendance: 12,600; Referee: César Muñiz Fernández |

| 21 January 2010 | Atlético Madrid | 1–1 | Celta Vigo | Madrid |
| 22:00 CET | Tiago 11' | Report | Trashorras 3' | Stadium: Vicente Calderón; Attendance: 48,000; Referee: Alberto Undiano Mallenco |

=== Second legs ===
| 27 January 2010 | Osasuna | 0–3 (1–5 agg.) | Racing Santander | Pamplona |
| 20:00 CET | | Report | Xisco 6'; Henrique 23'; Canales 78' | Stadium: Reyno de Navarra; Attendance: 16,000; Referee: Javier Turienzo Álvarez |

| 27 January 2010 | Sevilla | 0–1 (1–3 agg.) | Deportivo La Coruña | Seville |
| 22:00 CET | | Report | Bodipo 44' | Stadium: Ramón Sánchez Pizjuán; Attendance: 15,000; Referee: Fernando Teixeira Vitienes |

| 28 January 2010 | Getafe | 0–1 (2–2 agg.) | Mallorca | Getafe |
| 20:00 CET | | Report | Aduriz 45' | Stadium: Coliseum Alfonso Pérez; Attendance: 3,000; Referee: Manuel Mejuto González |

| 28 January 2010 | Celta Vigo | 0–1 (1–2 agg.) | Atlético Madrid | Vigo |
| 22:00 CET | | Report | Forlán 26' | Stadium: Balaídos; Attendance: 30,000; Referee: Miguel Ángel Pérez Lasa |

== Semi-finals ==
| Team 1 | Agg. | Team 2 | 1st leg | 2nd leg |
|---|---|---|---|---|
| Sevilla | 2–1 | Getafe | 2–0 | 0–1 |
| Atlético Madrid | 6–3 | Racing Santander | 4–0 | 2–3 |

=== First legs ===
| 3 February 2010 | Sevilla | 2–0 | Getafe | Seville |
| 22:00 CET | Luís Fabiano 45+1'; Mario 80' (o.g.) | Report | | Stadium: Ramón Sánchez Pizjuán; Attendance: 28,000; Referee: Bernardino González Vázquez |

| 4 February 2010 | Atlético Madrid | 4–0 | Racing Santander | Madrid |
| 22:00 CET | Simão 9'; Reyes 40'; Forlán 62' (pen.), 71' (pen.) | Report | | Stadium: Vicente Calderón; Attendance: 30,000; Referee: Antonio Mateu Lahoz |

=== Second legs ===
| 10 February 2010 | Getafe | 1–0 (1–2 agg.) | Sevilla | Getafe |
| 22:00 CET | Soldado 52' | Report | | Stadium: Coliseum Alfonso Pérez; Attendance: 16,000; Referee: Eduardo Iturralde González |

| 11 February 2010 | Racing Santander | 3–2 (3–6 agg.) | Atlético Madrid | Santander |
| 22:00 CET | Valera 2' (o.g.); Xisco 88'; Tchité 90' | Report | Moratón 8' (o.g.); Jurado 51' | Stadium: El Sardinero; Attendance: 18,000; Referee: Alberto Undiano Mallenco |

== Final ==
19 May 2010
21:30 CEST

| Sevilla | 2–0 | Atlético Madrid |
|---|---|---|
| Capel 5'; Navas 90+1' | Report |

Camp Nou, Barcelona
Attendance: 93,000
Referee: Manuel Mejuto González

== Top goalscorers ==
| Rank | Player | Club | Goals |
|---|---|---|---|
| 1 | (Argentina) Maxi Rodríguez | Atlético Madrid | 5 |
| 2 | (Spain) Jesús Navas | Sevilla | 4 |
| 2 | (Brazil) Luís Fabiano | Sevilla | 4 |
| 2 | (Spain) Roberto Soldado | Getafe | 4 |
| 5 | (Spain) Diego Capel | Sevilla | 3 |
| 5 | (Uruguay) Diego Forlán | Atlético Madrid | 3 |
| 5 | (Spain) Pedro | Barcelona | 3 |
| 5 | (Portugal) Simão | Atlético Madrid | 3 |
| 5 | (Burundi) Mohammed Tchité | Racing Santander | 3 |
| 5 | (Spain) Xisco | Racing Santander | 3 |
| 5 | (Serbia) Nikola Žigić | Valencia | 3 |
