= 2009–10 FC Barcelona season =

111th season in existence of FC Barcelona

Barcelona
2009–10 season
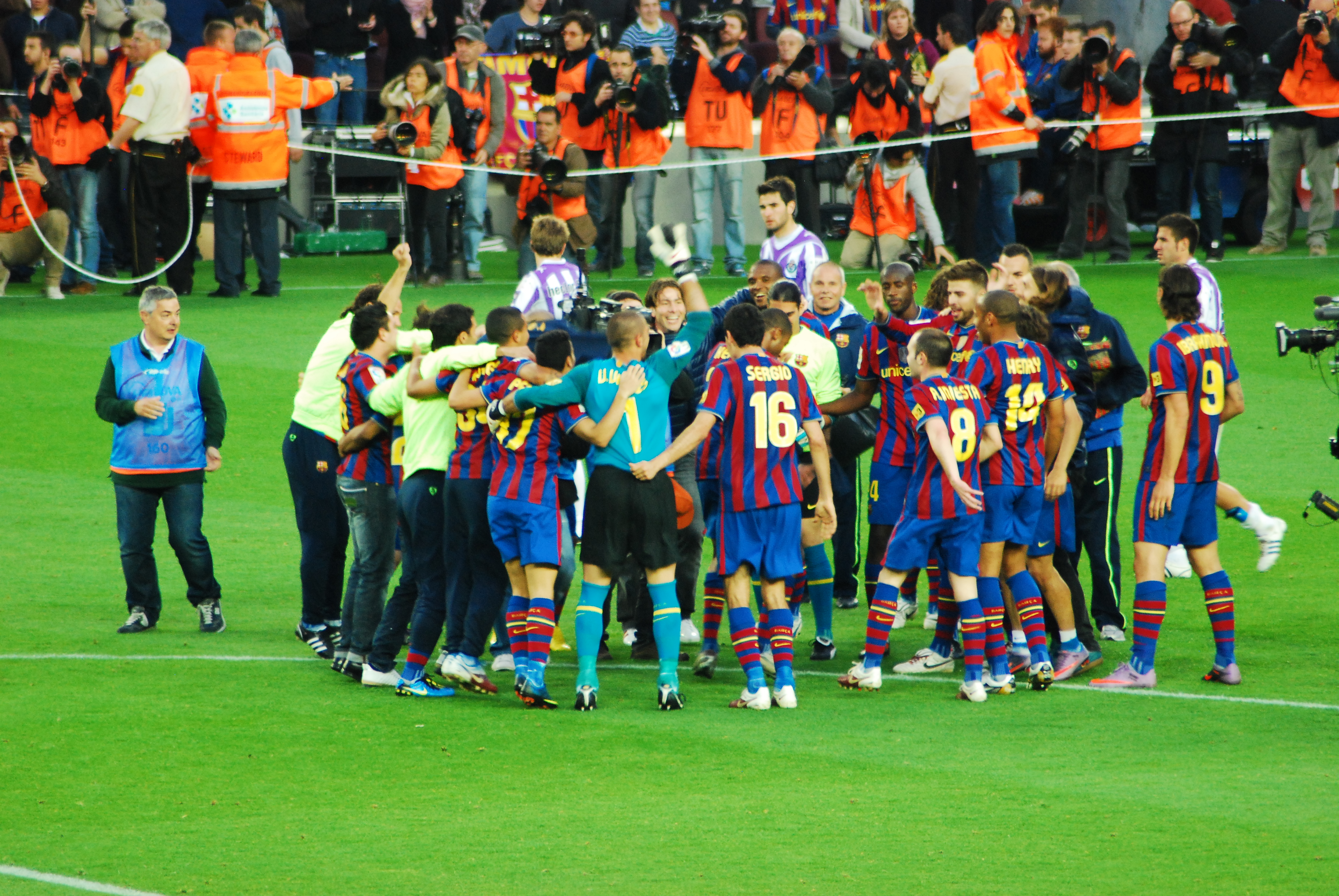
- FC Barcelona players celebrating their 2009–10 La Liga title win
- President: Joan Laporta
- Head coach: Pep Guardiola
- Stadium: Camp Nou
- La Liga: 1st
- Copa del Rey: Round of 16
- Supercopa de España: Winners
- UEFA Champions League: Semi-finals
- UEFA Super Cup: Winners
- FIFA Club World Cup: Winners
- Top goalscorer: League: Lionel Messi (34); All: Lionel Messi (47)
| Home colours | Away colours | Third colours |

In 2009–10, FC Barcelona started the new season with the prospect of winning six major competitions in the 2008–2009 season. They contested for the Supercopa de España, UEFA Super Cup, FIFA Club World Cup, Copa del Rey, La Liga, and the UEFA Champions League. During the summer transfer window, the club swapped their top league goal scorer during the treble season, Samuel Eto'o to Italy's Inter Milan in exchange for Zlatan Ibrahimović, along with €48 million, bringing the total to €69 million. On 16 May, Barcelona claimed its 20th league title with a then-record 99 points via a 4–0 victory over relegated side Valladolid to finish their 2009–10 season with four titles.

== Overview ==
Over the summer of 2009, along with Ibrahimović, Barcelona reinforced their squad with the signings of Inter Milan defender Maxwell, Brazilian club Palmeiras forward Keirrison (sent on loan with Portuguese club Benfica, then loaned out during the winter transfer window to Italian side Fiorentina), and Ukrainian team Shakhtar Donetsk defender Dmytro Chyhrynskyi. Continuing its tradition of using canteranos on the first team, Barcelona manager Pep Guardiola also promoted four players from the youth reserves, Jonathan dos Santos, Jeffrén, Andreu Fontàs and Marc Muniesa. Barcelona player Henrique, previously on loan with Bayer Leverkusen, briefly rejoined the squad for the pre-season but was again loaned out, this time to Racing de Santander.

== Off the field events ==
On 23 September, it was discovered by Catalan newspaper El Periódico of an investigation into the daily lives of four possible candidates for the Barcelona presidential election in 2010. The investigation was authorized by FC Barcelona director general, Joan Oliver, who hired investigating company Metodo 3 to gather daily information on vice president of institution and assets administration Joan Franquesa, vice president for marketing and media Jaume Ferrer, vice president for finance and treasurer Joan Boix, and vice president for sport Rafael Yuste between late March and early April 2009. Oliver stated in a press conference the next day at the Camp Nou that "Barça did no spying but were just protecting the entity of the club".

President Joan Laporta stated that "this happened five months ago. Certain events happened and when I found out about them, the corresponding explanations were given. These explanations were understood and accepted since no law was broken." He added that "it was understood that the reports that were asked for were within the limits of legality and were to protect the affected parties and the club. Therefore, the page was turned and the case was closed." Laporta also said that "we are better than we have ever been in our entire history in our methods of operation, and now, because they want to destabilise us, people drag up issues like these. We will continue the same way, because everyone does it as well. We are used to living under pressure and people trying to destabilise us... Barça is united and united we are unbeatable."

Barcelona manager Pep Guardiola stated that "he has shielded the squad from the scandal of the investigation" and that "the subject has not been spoken of in the locker room and even the captains have not mentioned it, there's total concentration."

On 11 November, vice-president Joan Franquesa handed in his resignation for "personal reasons". Continuing the turmoil in the Barcelona Board-Room. President Joan Laporta took action by restructuring the board of directors and making Albert Perrín, the new vice-president. Laporta stated "He was making changes for these individuals to get to know the best club better."

=== Ballon d'Or & FIFA World Player of the Year ===
On 1 December, France Football magazine announced Lionel Messi was the winner of the 2009 Ballon d'Or, thus making him the ninth player while playing at Barcelona and the first Argentine and canterano from La Masia to win the coveted footballer prize. Messi dedicated his triumph at the Ciutat Esportiva Joan Gamper to "my family, who have always been by my side and my teammates at Barça who've done everything to ensure I could win the award". He also addressed his teammates Xavi and Andrés Iniesta, who finished third and fourth respectively: "They've given everything for Barça and they deserve their recognition. If I'd had a vote I would have voted for any of the Barça players."

On 21 December, Messi was named 2009 FIFA World Player of the Year at the Kongresshaus Zürich in Zürich. Messi claimed the prize by a record vote with a considerable wide margin, receiving 1,073 votes to Real Madrid forward Cristiano Ronaldo's 352 votes, who finished second after winning the year before. Teammates Xavi and Iniesta finished in third and fifth respectively, closing out 2009 as one of the most memorable years in Barcelona history.

On 16 January, Messi became the youngest player to score 100 official goals for the Catalan club. He achieved the feat by scoring a brace in a league match vs Sevilla at the Camp Nou. He stated, "It was a relief to get the goal" and "the truth is that with all the big things that have happened to me, well I'm not giving them too much importance. I just try and live quietly and normally and keep my eye on achieving more."

On 16 May, Messi completed the 2009–10 as the Pichichi Trophy and the European Golden Shoe winner with 34 league goals. Víctor Valdés won the Zamora Trophy for the best La Liga goalkeeper of the season.

=== IFFHS Awards ===
On 13 January, the International Federation of Football History & Statistic named Xavi the 2009 World's Best Playmaker and both teammates Lionel Messi and Andrés Iniesta received second and fourth place respectively. Lastly, manager Pep Guardiola was named 2009 World Club Coach.

== FIFA Club World Cup & season friendly ==
On 6 November, director general Joan Oliver confirmed that Barcelona would play a friendly in Kuwait on 21 December against Kuwaiti club Kazma Sporting Club at Al-Sadaqua Walsalam Stadium. It took place after the FIFA Club World Cup which was being hosted in the same region by the United Arab Emirates. The match finished 1–1 with both goals coming in the last 10 minutes of the match in front of a sold-out crowd that gathered 45 minutes ahead of the kick-off time. Barcelona received €1.7 million to participate in the match.

On 16 December, Pedro became the first player in history to score in six different club competitions during a single season. He scored in La Liga, Copa del Rey, UEFA Champions League, UEFA Super Cup, Supercopa de España and the FIFA Club World Cup.

On 19 December, Barcelona was crowned FIFA Club World Cup champion with a 1–2 win over Argentine club Estudiantes in the final, making it the sixth title they've won in 2009 and the first club to accomplish that feat within one calendar year known as The Sextuple.

== Squad ==
| N | Pos. | Nat. | Name | Age | EU | Since | App | Goals | Ends | Transfer fee | Notes |
|---|---|---|---|---|---|---|---|---|---|---|---|
| 1 | GK | (Spain) | Víctor Valdés (VC) | 28 | EU | 2002 | 362 | 0 | 2014 | Youth system | |
| 2 | DF | (Brazil) | Dani Alves | 27 | EU | 2008 | 102 | 8 | 2012 | €29M | Second nationality: Spain |
| 3 | DF | (Spain) | Gerard Piqué | 23 | EU | 2008 | 94 | 7 | 2012 | Youth system | |
| 4 | DF | (Mexico) | Rafael Márquez | 31 | EU | 2003 | 242 | 13 | 2012 | €5M | |
| 5 | DF | (Spain) | Carles Puyol (captain) | 32 | EU | 1999 | 488 | 8 | 2013 | Youth system | |
| 6 | MF | (Spain) | Xavi (VC) | 30 | EU | 1998 | 527 | 53 | 2014 | Youth system | |
| 8 | MF | (Spain) | Andrés Iniesta (VC) | 26 | EU | 2002 | 310 | 24 | 2014 | Youth system | |
| 9 | FW | (Sweden) | Zlatan Ibrahimović | 28 | EU | 2009 | 45 | 21 | 2014 | €46M | |
| 10 | FW | (Argentina) | Lionel Messi | 22 | EU | 2004 | 213 | 126 | 2014 | Youth system | Second nationality: Spain |
| 11 | FW | (Spain) | Bojan | 19 | EU | 2007 | 124 | 33 | 2013 | Youth system | |
| 13 | GK | (Spain) | José Manuel Pinto | 34 | EU | 2008 | 16 | 0 | 2010 | €0.5M | |
| 14 | FW | (France) | Thierry Henry | 32 | EU | 2007 | 121 | 49 | 2011 | €24M | |
| 15 | MF | (Mali) | Seydou Keita | 30 | EU | 2008 | 86 | 12 | 2012 | €14M | Second nationality: France |
| 16 | MF | (Spain) | Sergio Busquets | 21 | EU | 2008 | 93 | 4 | 2013 | Youth system | |
| 17 | FW | (Spain) | Pedro | 22 | EU | 2008 | 68 | 23 | 2014 | Youth system | |
| 18 | DF | (Argentina) | Gabriel Milito | 29 | EU | 2007 | 59 | 1 | 2011 | €17M | Second nationality: Italy |
| 19 | LB | (Brazil) | Maxwell | 28 | Non-EU | 2009 | 77 | 1 | 2014 | €4.5M | |
| 20 | FW | (Venezuela) | Jeffrén | 22 | EU | 2009 | 21 | 2 | 2014 | Youth system | |
| 21 | DF | (Ukraine) | Dmytro Chyhrynskyi | 23 | Non-EU | 2009 | 14 | 0 | 2014 | €25M | |
| 22 | DF | (France) | Eric Abidal | 30 | EU | 2007 | 109 | 0 | 2011 | €15M | |
| 24 | MF | (Ivory Coast) | Touré Yaya | 27 | Non-EU | 2007 | 118 | 6 | 2012 | €9M | Under Bosman ruling |

- Last updated: 4 May 2021
- Source: FCBarcelona.cat, Players in / out, Wikipedia players' articles, ESPN (for appearances and goals) and footballdatabase.com (for EU passport)

Total squad cost: €200 million

=== From youth system ===
Note: Flags indicate national team as defined under FIFA eligibility rules; some limited exceptions apply. Players may hold more than one non-FIFA nationality.

| No. | Pos. | Nation | Player |
|---|---|---|---|
| 26 | DF | ESP | Marc Bartra |
| 28 | MF | MEX | Jonathan dos Santos |
| 29 | MF | ESP | Víctor Vázquez |
| 30 | GK | ESP | Rubén Miño |
| 31 | FW | ISR | Gai Assulin |
| 32 | DF | ESP | Andreu Fontàs |

| No. | Pos. | Nation | Player |
|---|---|---|---|
| 33 | DF | ESP | Marc Muniesa |
| 34 | MF | ESP | Thiago |
| 36 | FW | ESP | Jonathan Soriano |

=== Transfers ===
==== In ====
| No. | Pos. | Nat. | Name | Age | EU | Moving from | Type | Transfer window | Ends | Transfer fee | Source |
|---|---|---|---|---|---|---|---|---|---|---|---|
| 9 | FW | (Sweden) | Ibrahimović | 27 | EU | Internazionale (Italy) | Transfer | Summer | 2014 | €46M + Samuel Eto'o | FCBarcelona.cat |
| 19 | LB | (Brazil) | Maxwell | 27 | Non-EU | Internazionale (Italy) | Transfer | Summer | 2014 | €4.5M + €0.5M in variables | FCBarcelona.cat |
| — | FW | (Brazil) | Keirrison | 20 | Non-EU | Palmeiras (Brazil) | Transfer | Summer | 2014 | €14M + €2M in variables | FCBarcelona.cat |
| 21 | DF | (Ukraine) | Chyhrynskyi | 22 | Non-EU | Shakhtar Donetsk (Ukraine) | Transfer | Summer | 2014 | €25M | FCBarcelona.cat |
| 17 | FW | (Spain) | Pedro | 22 | EU | Barcelona B | Promoted | Summer | 2014 | Free | |
| 20 | FW | (Spain) | Jeffrén | 21 | EU | Barcelona B | Promoted | Summer | 2014 | Free | |

Total spending: ▼€85.5 million + Samuel Eto'o

==== Out ====
| No. | Pos. | Nat. | Name | Age | EU | Moving to | Type | Transfer window | Transfer fee | Source |
|---|---|---|---|---|---|---|---|---|---|---|
| — | DF | (Spain) | Botía | 20 | EU | Sporting Gijón | Loan | Summer | N/A | |
| 16 | LB | (Brazil) | Sylvinho | 35 | EU | Manchester City (England) | Contract Termination | Summer | Free | FCBarcelona.cat |
| 9 | FW | (Cameroon) | Eto'o | 28 | EU | Internazionale (Italy) | Swap | Summer | Free | FCBarcelona.cat |
| 21 | MF | (Belarus) | Hleb | 28 | Non-EU | VfB Stuttgart (Germany) | Loan | Summer | N/A | FCBarcelona.cat |
| 2 | DF | (Uruguay) | Cáceres | 22 | Non-EU | Juventus (Italy) | Loan | Summer | N/A | FCBarcelona.cat |
| — | FW | (Brazil) | Keirrison | 20 | Non-EU | Fiorentina (Italy) | Loan | Summer | N/A | FCBarcelona.cat |
| — | DF | (Spain) | V. Sánchez | 22 | EU | Xerez | Loan | Summer | N/A | FCBarcelona.cat |
| 25 | GK | (Spain) | Jorquera | 30 | EU | Girona | Contract Termination | Summer | Free | FCBarcelona.cat |
| 23 | DF | (Brazil) | Henrique | 22 | Non-EU | Racing Santander (Spain) | Loan | Summer | N/A | realracingclub.com |
| 7 | AM | (Iceland) | Guðjohnsen | 30 | EU | Monaco (France) | Transfer | Summer | €2M | asm-fc.com |

Total income: ▲€2 million.

Expenditure: ▼€83.5 million + Eto'o.

== Player statistics ==
=== Squad stats ===
| | | | | Total | | | | UEFA Champions League | | La Liga | | Copa del Rey | | Others^{1} | | |
| N | Pos. | Name | Nat. | GS | App | Gls | Min | App | Gls | App | Gls | App | Gls | App | Gls | Notes |
|---|---|---|---|---|---|---|---|---|---|---|---|---|---|---|---|---|
| 1 | GK | V. Valdés | (Spain) | 55 | 55 | | 4200 | 12 | | 38 | | | | 5 | | |
| 13 | GK | Pinto | (Spain) | 4 | 4 | | 360 | | | | | 4 | | | | |
| 2 | DF | Dani Alves | (Brazil) | 47 | 48 | 3 | 3767 | 11 | | 29 | 3 | 3 | | 5 | | |
| 3 | DF | Piqué | (Spain) | 43 | 49 | 4 | 3198 | 11 | 2 | 32 | 2 | 1 | | 5 | | |
| 4 | DF | Márquez | (Mexico) | 14 | 23 | 1 | 1179 | 4 | | 15 | 1 | 3 | | 1 | | |
| 5 | DF | Puyol | (Spain) | 47 | 48 | 1 | 3556 | 9 | | 32 | 1 | 2 | | 5 | | |
| 18 | DF | Milito | (Argentina) | 12 | 16 | | 931 | 5 | | 10 | | 1 | | | | |
| 19 | DF | Maxwell | (Brazil) | 32 | 36 | | 2229 | 7 | | 25 | | 3 | | 1 | | |
| 21 | DF | Chyhrynskyi | (Ukraine) | 12 | 14 | | 942 | | | 12 | | 2 | | | | |
| 22 | DF | Abidal | (France) | 27 | 31 | | 2337 | 8 | | 17 | | 2 | | 4 | | |
| 32 | DF | Fontàs | (Spain) | | 2 | | 38 | | | 1 | | 1 | | | | |
| 40 | DF | Bartra | (Spain) | | 1 | | 29 | | | 1 | | | | | | |
| 6 | MF | Xavi | (Spain) | 47 | 53 | 7 | 3814 | 11 | 1 | 34 | 3 | 3 | 2 | 5 | 1 | |
| 8 | MF | A. Iniesta | (Spain) | 31 | 43 | 1 | 2838 | 9 | | 30 | 1 | 3 | | 1 | | |
| 15 | MF | Keita | (Mali) | 36 | 44 | 6 | 2539 | 10 | | 29 | 6 | 1 | | 4 | | |
| 16 | MF | Busquets | (Spain) | 36 | 51 | 1 | 2941 | 10 | | 33 | | 3 | | 5 | 1 | |
| 24 | MF | Touré Yaya | (Ivory Coast) | 30 | 36 | 1 | 2041 | 8 | | 22 | 1 | 1 | | 5 | | |
| 28 | MF | Jonathan | (Mexico) | 2 | 6 | | 186 | 1 | | 3 | | 2 | | | | |
| 34 | MF | Thiago | (Spain) | 1 | 2 | 1 | 83 | | | 1 | 1 | 1 | | | | |
| 9 | FW | Ibrahimović | (Sweden) | 35 | 45 | 21 | 2980 | 10 | 4 | 29 | 16 | 2 | 1 | 4 | | |
| 10 | FW | Messi | (Argentina) | 43 | 53 | 47 | 3636 | 11 | 8 | 35 | 34 | 3 | 1 | 4 | 4 | |
| 11 | FW | Bojan | (Spain) | 16 | 36 | 12 | 1080 | 5 | 1 | 23 | 8 | 4 | 2 | 4 | 1 | |
| 14 | FW | Henry | (France) | 22 | 32 | 4 | 1805 | 6 | | 21 | 4 | 1 | | 4 | | |
| 17 | FW | Pedro | (Spain) | 31 | 50 | 23 | 2638 | 8 | 4 | 33 | 12 | 4 | 3 | 5 | 4 | |
| 20 | FW | Jeffrén | (Venezuela) | 8 | 18 | 2 | 498 | 2 | | 12 | 2 | 2 | | 2 | | |
| 31 | FW | Assulin | (Israel) | 1 | 1 | | 57 | | | | | 1 | | | | |
| 36 | FW | Soriano | (Spain) | | 1 | | 6 | | | | | 1 | | | | |

Last updated: 18 May
Source: FCBarcelona.cat
Ordered by position
0 shown as blank
^{1} Other Competitions: Supercopa de España, UEFA Super Cup, FIFA Club World Cup

=== Disciplinary records ===
| N | Pos. | Nat. | Name | Yellow card | Second yellow card | Red card | Notes |
|---|---|---|---|---|---|---|---|
| 1 | GK | (Spain) | V. Valdés | 2 | | | |
| 13 | GK | (Spain) | Pinto | | | | |
| 2 | DF | (Brazil) | Dani Alves | 11 | 1 | | |
| 3 | DF | (Spain) | Piqué | 11 | | 1 | |
| 4 | DF | (Mexico) | Márquez | 4 | | 1 | |
| 5 | DF | (Spain) | Puyol | 11 | | 1 | |
| 18 | DF | (Argentina) | Milito | 3 | | | |
| 19 | DF | (Brazil) | Maxwell | 6 | | | |
| 21 | DF | (Ukraine) | Chyhrynskyi | 3 | | | |
| 22 | DF | (France) | Abidal | 2 | | | |
| 6 | MF | (Spain) | Xavi | 4 | | | |
| 8 | MF | (Spain) | A. Iniesta | 3 | | | |
| 15 | MF | (Mali) | Keita | 9 | | | |
| 16 | MF | (Spain) | Sergio | 8 | 1 | | |
| 24 | MF | (Ivory Coast) | Touré Yaya | 6 | | | |
| 34 | MF | (Spain) | Thiago | 1 | | | |
| 9 | FW | (Sweden) | Ibrahimović | 8 | | 1 | |
| 10 | FW | (Argentina) | Messi | 6 | | | |
| 11 | FW | (Spain) | Bojan | 3 | | | |
| 14 | FW | (France) | Henry | 4 | | | |
| 17 | FW | (Spain) | Pedro | 5 | | | |
| 20 | FW | (Venezuela) | Jeffrén | 2 | | | |

Last updated: 16 May
Source: Competitive matches
Only competitive matches
(yellow card) = Number of bookings; (second yellow card) = Number of sending offs after a second yellow card; (red card) = Number of sending offs by a direct red card.

== Club ==
=== Coaching staff ===
| Position | Staff |
|---|---|
| Head coach | (Spain) Pep Guardiola |
| Assistant coach | (Spain) Tito Vilanova |
| Goalkeeping coach | (Spain) Juan Carlos Unzué |

Last updated: 2 December
Source: http://www.fcbarcelona.com/web/english/futbol/temporada_08-

== Pre-season and friendlies ==
Special kit worn during Joan Gamper Trophy match vs. Manchester City

| Game | Date | Tournament | Round | Ground | Opponent | Score^{1} | Report |
|---|---|---|---|---|---|---|---|
| 1 | 24 July | Wembley Cup | 1 day | N | Tottenham Hotspur | 1–1 | Report / Report link; Kick off / 21:00 CEST; Attendance / 57,932; Referee / Mark Halsey (England); Barcelona / Tottenham Hotspur; Bojan 32' / 83' Livermore |
| 2 | 26 July | Wembley Cup | 2 day | N | Al Ahly | 4–1 | Report / Report link; Kick off / 14:15 CEST; Attendance / 64,562; Referee / Chris Foy (England); Barcelona / Al Ahly; Bojan 15'; Rueda 40'; Jeffrén 55'; Pedro 66' / 30' El-Agazy |
| 3 | 1 August | USA Tour | — | N | LA Galaxy | 2–1 | Report / Report link; Kick off / 20:00 PST; Attendance / 93,137; Referee / Baldomero Toledo (United States); Barcelona / LA Galaxy; Pedro 11'; Touré (yellow card) 43'; Jeffrén 66' / 44' Beckham; (yellow card) 53' Gordon |
| 4 | 5 August | USA Tour | — | A | Seattle Sounders FC | 4–0 | Report / Report link; Kick off / 19:30 PST; Attendance / 66,848; Referee / Mark Geiger (United States); Barcelona / Seattle Sounders FC; Messi 21', 40'; Busquets (yellow card) 31'; Jeffrén 74'; Pedro 89' / (yellow card) 81' Fucito |
| 5 | 9 August | USA Tour | — | N | Guadalajara | 1–1 | Report / Report link; Kick off / 20:00 PST; Attendance / 61,572; Referee / Ricardo Salazar (Mexico); Barcelona / Guadalajara; Bojan 63' / (yellow card) 19' Araujo; 49' Morales; (yellow card) 58' Pineda |
| 6 | 19 August | Joan Gamper Trophy | — | H | Manchester City | 0–1 | Report / Report link; Kick off / 22:15 CEST; Attendance / 94,123; Referee / David Miranda Torres (Spain); Barcelona / Manchester City; / 28' Petrov |

Last updated: 26 November
Source: FC Barcelona
^{1}Barcelona goals come first.
National flags for Ground and Opponent columns are only shown when different from that of Barcelona.
M = Match; Ground: H = Home, A = Away, N = Neutral, HR = Home replacement, AR = Away replacement.

| 21 December 2009 Friendly | Kazma | 1–1 | Barcelona | Kuwait City, [[]] |
| 17:15 CET | Abdullah 90+3' | (Report) | Bojan 80' | Stadium: Al-Sadaqua Walsalam; Attendance: 21,500; Referee: Abdul Salow (Kuwait) |

== Competitions ==
=== Overall ===
As in nine out of the last ten seasons, Barcelona is going to be present in all major competitions: La Liga, the UEFA Champions League and the Copa del Rey. The previous season's treble success means that Barcelona will also contest the FIFA Club World Cup, the UEFA Super Cup and the Supercopa de España. The side will also be present in the Copa Catalunya.

| Competition | Started round | Final position / round | First match | Last match |
|---|---|---|---|---|
| La Liga | — | Winner | 30 August 2009 | 16 May 2010 |
| UEFA Super Cup | Final | Winner | 28 August 2009 | |
| FIFA Club World Cup | Semi-final | Winner | 16 December 2009 | 19 December 2009 |
| Supercopa de España | Final | Winner | 16 August 2009 | 23 August 2009 |
| Copa del Rey | Round of 32 | Round of 16 | 28 October 2009 | 13 January 2010 |
| UEFA Champions League | Group stage | Semi-final | 16 September 2009 | 28 April 2010 |

Updated to match played 16 May
Source: Competitions

=== Supercopa de España ===
| 16 August 2009 First leg | Athletic Bilbao | 1–2 | Barcelona | Bilbao |
| 22:00 CEST (UTC+02:00) | De Marcos 44'; Gurpegui (yellow card) 69'; Koikili (yellow card) 78' | Report | Piqué (yellow card) 52'; Xavi 58'; Pedro 68'; Alves (yellow card) 89' | Stadium: San Mamés; Attendance: 40,000; Referee: Antonio Rubinos Pérez (Community of Madrid) |

| 23 August 2009 Second leg | Barcelona | 3–0 (5–1 agg.) | Athletic Bilbao | Barcelona |
| 22:00 CEST | Puyol (yellow card) 20'; Touré (yellow card) 33'; Messi 49', 67' (pen.); Bojan 72'; Xavi (yellow card) 77' | (Report) | Etxebarria (yellow card) 15'; López (yellow card) 43'; Toquero (yellow card) 63'; Ustaritz (yellow card) 66' | Stadium: Camp Nou; Attendance: 61,803; Referee: Carlos Velasco Carballo (Community of Madrid) |

=== UEFA Super Cup ===
| 28 August 2009 Final | Barcelona (Spain) | 1–0 (a.e.t.) | (Ukraine) Shakhtar Donetsk | Monaco |
| 20:45 CEST | Messi (yellow card) 89'; Pedro (yellow card) 108', (goal) 115' | (Report) | Ilsinho (yellow card) 54'; Srna (yellow card) 64'; Kucher (yellow card) 89' | Stadium: Stade Louis II; Attendance: 18,000; Referee: Frank De Bleeckere (Belgium) |

=== FIFA Club World Cup ===
| 16 December 2009 Semi-finals | Atlante (Mexico) | 1–3 | (Spain) Barcelona | Abu Dhabi, United Arab Emirates |
| 17:00 CET (UTC+01:00) | Rojas 5'; Solari (yellow card) 8'; Chepe (yellow card) 40'; Velázquez (yellow card) 61' | Report | Busquets 35'; Messi 55'; Ibrahimović (yellow card) 65'; Pedro 67'; Piqué (yellow card) 90+2' | Stadium: Sheikh Zayed; Attendance: 40,955; Referee: Carlos Eugênio Simon (Brazil) |

| 19 December 2009 Final | Estudiantes (Argentina) | 1–2 (a.e.t.) | (Spain) Barcelona | Abu Dhabi, United Arab Emirates |
| 17:00 CET (UTC+01:00) | Boselli 37'; Díaz (yellow card) 45+2'; Rodríguez (yellow card) 58'; Pérez (yellow card) 65'; Sánchez (yellow card) 94'; Rojo (yellow card) 112'; Braña (yellow card) 119'; Desábato (yellow card) 119' | Report | Messi (yellow card) 23', (goal) 110'; Henry (yellow card) 82'; Pedro 89'; Valdés (yellow card) 118' | Stadium: Sheikh Zayed; Attendance: 43,050; Referee: Benito Archundia (Mexico) |

=== La Liga ===
==== League table ====
| Pos | Team | Pld | W | D | L | GF | GA | GD | Pts | Qualification or relegation |
|---|---|---|---|---|---|---|---|---|---|---|
| 1 | Barcelona (C) | 38 | 31 | 6 | 1 | 98 | 24 | +74 | 99 | Qualification for the Champions League group stage |
| 2 | Real Madrid | 38 | 31 | 3 | 4 | 102 | 35 | +67 | 96 | Qualification for the Champions League group stage |
| 3 | Valencia | 38 | 21 | 8 | 9 | 59 | 40 | +19 | 71 | Qualification for the Champions League group stage |
| 4 | Sevilla | 38 | 19 | 6 | 13 | 65 | 49 | +16 | 63 | Qualification for the Champions League play-off round |
| 5 | Mallorca | 38 | 18 | 8 | 12 | 59 | 44 | +15 | 62 (Note: Mallorca could not qualify for the 2010–11 UEFA Europa League due to being immersed in a creditor contest, a situation against UEFA criteria. Then, Villarreal was invited to replace this spot.) | |

Source: LFP and Yahoo! Sport
Rules for classification: 1) points; 2) head-to-head points; 3) head-to-head goal difference; 4) head-to-head goals scored; 5) goal difference; 6) number of goals scored.
(C) Champions

==== Results summary ====
| Overall | | | | | | | | Home | | | | | | Away | | | | | |
| Pld | W | D | L | GF | GA | GD | Pts | W | D | L | GF | GA | GD | W | D | L | GF | GA | GD |
|---|---|---|---|---|---|---|---|---|---|---|---|---|---|---|---|---|---|---|---|
| 38 | 31 | 6 | 1 | 98 | 24 | +74 | 99 | 18 | 1 | 0 | 57 | 11 | +46 | 13 | 5 | 1 | 41 | 13 | +28 |

Last updated: 8 May.
Source: Competitive Matches

==== Results by round ====
| Round | 1 | 2 | 3 | 4 | 5 | 6 | 7 | 8 | 9 | 10 | 11 | 12 | 13 | 14 | 15 | 16 | 17 | 18 | 19 | 20 | 21 | 22 | 23 | 24 | 25 | 26 | 27 | 28 | 29 | 30 | 31 | 32 | 33 | 34 | 35 | 36 | 37 | 38 |
|---|---|---|---|---|---|---|---|---|---|---|---|---|---|---|---|---|---|---|---|---|---|---|---|---|---|---|---|---|---|---|---|---|---|---|---|---|---|---|
| Ground | H | A | H | A | A | H | A | H | A | H | A | H | A | H | A | H | A | H | A | A | H | A | H | H | A | H | A | H | A | H | A | H | A | H | A | H | A | H |
| Result | W | W | W | W | W | W | D | W | D | W | D | W | W | W | W | D | W | W | W | W | W | L | W | W | D | W | W | W | W | W | W | W | D | W | W | W | W | W |
| Position | 2 | 1 | 2 | 1 | 2 | 1 | 1 | 1 | 1 | 1 | 2 | 1 | 1 | 1 | 1 | 1 | 1 | 1 | 1 | 1 | 1 | 1 | 1 | 1 | 2 | 2 | 2 | 2 | 2 | 2 | 1 | 1 | 1 | 1 | 1 | 1 | 1 | 1 |

Updated to match(es) played on 4 May. Source: Competitive Matches
A = Away; H = Home; W = Win; D = Draw; L = Loss

==== Matches ====
| 31 August 2009 1 | Barcelona | 3–0 | Sporting Gijón | Barcelona |
| 22:00 CEST (UTC+02:00) | Bojan 18'; Keita 42'; Ibrahimović 82' | Report | Barral (yellow card) 27'; Rivera (yellow card) 71' | Stadium: Camp Nou; Attendance: 71,993; Referee: Rafael Ramírez Domínguez (Andalusia) |

| 12 September 2009 2 | Getafe | 0–2 | Barcelona | Getafe |
| 18:00 CEST (UTC+02:00) | Mané (yellow card) 70'; Soldado (yellow card) 77'; Rafa (yellow card) 85' | Report | Keita (yellow card) 51'; Ibrahimović 66'; Messi 80' | Stadium: Coliseum Alfonso Pérez; Attendance: 17,000; Referee: Eduardo Iturralde González (Basque Country) |

| 19 September 2009 3 | Barcelona | 5–2 | Atlético Madrid | Barcelona |
| 22:00 CEST (UTC+02:00) | Ibrahimović 2'; Messi 16', 90+4'; Alves 30'; Keita 41'; Chyhrynskyi (yellow card) 68' | (Report) | Assunção (yellow card) 33'; Ujfaluši (yellow card) 38'; Agüero 45'; Forlán 84'; Pablo (yellow card) 90+3' | Stadium: Camp Nou; Attendance: 72,928; Referee: Manuel Mejuto González (Asturias) |

| 22 September 2009 4 | Racing Santander | 1–4 | Barcelona | Santander |
| 22:00 CEST (UTC+02:00) | Diop (yellow card) 19'; Lacen (yellow card) 55'; Serrano 73'; Xisco (yellow card) 77'; Pinillos (yellow card) 90' | (Report) | Ibrahimović 21', (yellow card) 45'; Messi 24', 63'; Piqué 27' | Stadium: El Sardinero; Attendance: 22,251; Referee: Antonio Mateu Lahoz (Valencian Community) |

| 26 September 2009 5 | Málaga | 0–2 | Barcelona | Málaga |
| 20:00 CEST (UTC+02:00) | Baha (yellow card) 16'; Duda (yellow card) 67'; Weligton (yellow card) 69'; Luque (red card) 85' | Report | Touré (yellow card) 31'; Ibrahimović 38', (yellow card) 69'; Piqué 58', (yellow card) 69' | Stadium: La Rosaleda; Attendance: 22,800; Referee: Carlos Delgado Ferreiro (Basque Country) |

| 3 October 2009 6 | Barcelona | 1–0 | Almería | Barcelona |
| 20:00 CEST (UTC+02:00) | Xavi (yellow card) 20'; Pedro 31'; Iniesta (yellow card) 78'; Puyol (yellow card) 79' | Report | Ortiz (yellow card) 39'; Bernardello (yellow card) 45+1'; Crusat (yellow card) 45+1' | Stadium: Camp Nou; Attendance: 74,177; Referee: Carlos Velasco Carballo (Community of Madrid) |

| 17 October 2009 7 | Valencia | 0–0 | Barcelona | Valencia |
| 22:00 CEST (UTC+02:00) | Silva (yellow card) 52'; Banega (yellow card) 62'; Albelda (yellow card) 68'; Navarro (yellow card) 72'; Miguel (yellow card) 86' | Report | Piqué (yellow card) 79'; Alves (yellow card) 90+4' | Stadium: Mestalla; Attendance: 50,000; Referee: Alfonso Pérez Burrull (Cantabria) |

| 25 October 2009 8 | Barcelona | 6–1 | Zaragoza | Barcelona |
| 21:00 CEST (UTC+02:00) | Keita 25', 41', 86'; Ibrahimović 29', 56'; Messi 80' | Report | Gabi (yellow card) 28'; Aguilar (yellow card) 39'; López 78' | Stadium: Camp Nou; Attendance: 75,653; Referee: José Luis Paradas Romero (Andalusia) |

| 31 October 2009 9 | Osasuna | 1–1 | Barcelona | Pamplona |
| 20:00 CET (UTC+01:00) | Aranda (yellow card) 18'; Piqué 90+2' (o.g.) | Report | Chyhrynskyi (yellow card) 51'; Keita (yellow card) 55', (goal) 73'; Ibrahmović (yellow card) 63' | Stadium: El Sadar; Attendance: 19,800; Referee: Antonio Rubinos Pérez (Community of Madrid) |

| 7 November 2009 10 | Barcelona | 4–2 | Mallorca | Barcelona |
| 20:00 CET (UTC+01:00) | Pedro 11', 40'; Henry 44'; S. Keita (yellow card) 66'; Messi 87' (pen.) | Report | Nunes 20'; Valero (yellow card) 33'; Varela (yellow card) 43'; A. Keita 90' | Stadium: Camp Nou; Attendance: 77,491; Referee: Javier Turienzo Álvarez (Castile and León) |

| 21 November 2009 11 | Athletic Bilbao | 1–1 | Barcelona | Bilbao |
| 22:00 CET (UTC+01:00) | Toquero 63'; Martínez (yellow card) 81' | Report | Alves 54'; Keita (yellow card) 65' | Stadium: San Mamés; Attendance: 40,000; Referee: Fernando Teixeira Vitienes (Cantabria) |

| 29 November 2009 12 | Barcelona | 1–0 | Real Madrid | Barcelona |
| 19:00 CET (UTC+01:00) | Busquets (yellow card) 50' (yellow-red card) 63'; Ibrahimović 56'; Puyol (yellow card) 66' | Report | Arbeloa (yellow card) 34'; Albiol (yellow card) 41'; L. Diarra (yellow card) 48' (yellow-red card) 90'; Pepe (yellow card) 69'; Marcelo (yellow card) 79' | Stadium: Camp Nou; Attendance: 97,138; Referee: Alberto Undiano Mallenco (Navarre) |

| 2 December 2009 13 | Xerez | 0–2 | Barcelona | Jerez |
| 22:00 CET (UTC+01:00) | Aythami (yellow card) 79' | Report | Henry 47'; Ibrahimović 90+3' | Stadium: Municipal de Chapín; Attendance: 17,584; Referee: Carlos Velasco Carballo (Community of Madrid) |

| 5 December 2009 14 | Deportivo La Coruña | 1–3 | Barcelona | A Coruña |
| 22:00 CET (UTC+01:00) | Adrián 39'; Mista (yellow card) 58' | Report | Messi 27', 80'; Alves (yellow card) 48'; Abidal (yellow card) 77'; Ibrahimović 88' | Stadium: Riazor; Attendance: 34,600; Referee: David Fernández Borbalán (Andalusia) |

| 12 December 2009 15 | Barcelona | 1–0 | Espanyol | Barcelona |
| 20:00 CET (UTC+01:00) | Ibrahimović (yellow card) 31', (goal) 39' (pen.); Piqué (yellow card) 84'; Puyol (yellow card) 86' | Report | Forlín (yellow card) 18'; Chica (yellow card) 30'; Baena (yellow card) 38'; García (yellow card) 40' | Stadium: Camp Nou; Attendance: 84,599; Referee: Eduardo Iturralde González (Basque Country) |

| 2 January 2010 16 | Barcelona | 1–1 | Villarreal | Barcelona |
| 20:00 CET (UTC+01:00) | Pedro 7'; Puyol (yellow card) 36'; Ibrahimović (yellow card) 88' | Report | Venta (yellow card) 32'; Fuster (yellow card) 43', (goal) 51'; Bruno (yellow card) 53'; Marcano (yellow card) 78' | Stadium: Camp Nou; Attendance: 77,622; Referee: Bernardino González Vázquez (Galicia) |

| 10 January 2010 17 | Tenerife | 0–5 | Barcelona | Tenerife |
| 20:00 CET (UTC+01:00) | Luna (yellow card) 30'; Ayoze (yellow card) 41'; Kome (yellow card) 43' | Report | Márquez (yellow card) 21'; Messi 36', 45+1', 75'; Puyol (yellow card) 42', (goal) 44'; Luna 86' (o.g.) | Stadium: Heliodoro Rodríguez López; Attendance: 22,510; Referee: Miguel Ángel Pérez Lasa (Basque Country) |

| 16 January 2010 18 | Barcelona | 4–0 | Sevilla | Barcelona |
| 22:00 CET (UTC+01:00) | Escudé 49' (o.g.); Abidal (yellow card) 64'; Busquets (yellow card) 65'; Pedro 70'; Messi 85', 90+2' | Report | Valiente (yellow card) 36'; Lolo (yellow card) 48'; Navarro (yellow card) 55'; Duscher (yellow card) 75' | Stadium: Camp Nou; Attendance: 63,274; Referee: Carlos Delgado Ferreiro (Basque Country) |

| 23 January 2010 19 | Real Valladolid | 0–3 | Barcelona | Valladolid |
| 20:00 CET (UTC+01:00) | Marcos (yellow card) 81'; Borja (yellow card) 85' | Report | Xavi 21'; Alves 22'; Piqué (yellow card) 43'; Keita (yellow card) 51'; Messi 55' | Stadium: José Zorrilla; Attendance: 24,213; Referee: Rafael Ramírez Domínguez (Andalusia) |

| 30 January 2010 20 | Sporting Gijón | 0–1 | Barcelona | Gijón |
| 20:00 CET (UTC+01:00) | Carmelo (yellow card) 11'; Lora (yellow card) 48'; Portilla (yellow card) 62'; Botía (yellow card) 72'; Barral (yellow card) 76'; Rivera (yellow card) 85' | Report | Pedro 30', (yellow card) 59'; Messi (yellow card) 81'; Puyol (yellow card) 90+3' | Stadium: El Molinón; Attendance: 24,500; Referee: José Luis Paradas Romero (Andalusia) |

| 6 February 2010 21 | Barcelona | 2–1 | Getafe | Barcelona |
| 20:00 CET (UTC+01:00) | Messi 7'; Maxwell (yellow card) 24'; Piqué (red card) 25'; Xavi (yellow card) 27', (goal) 67'; Busquets (yellow card) 82'; Márquez (red card) 90+2' | Report | Mané (yellow card) 17'; Boateng (yellow card) 53'; Casquero (yellow card) 81'; Soldado 90+4' (pen.) | Stadium: Camp Nou; Attendance: 74,859; Referee: Fernando Teixeira Vitienes (Cantabria) |

| 14 February 2010 22 | Atlético Madrid | 2–1 | Barcelona | Madrid |
| 21:00 CET (UTC+01:00) | Forlán 9'; Simão 22', (yellow card) 60'; Tiago (yellow card) 68' | Report | Ibrahimović 27', (yellow card) 88'; Jeffrén (yellow card) 28'; Maxwell (yellow card) 67'; Busquets (yellow card) 75'; Puyol (yellow card) 80' | Stadium: Vicente Calderón; Attendance: 53,000; Referee: Eduardo Iturralde González (Basque Country) |

| 20 February 2010 23 | Barcelona | 4–0 | Racing Santander | Barcelona |
| 20:00 CET (UTC+01:00) | Iniesta 7'; Henry 29', (yellow card) 54'; Márquez 34', (yellow card) 38'; Touré (yellow card) 43'; Thiago 84' | Report | Moral (yellow card) 33'; Oriol (yellow card) 54'; Serrano (yellow card) 82'; Henrique (yellow card) 89' | Stadium: Camp Nou; Attendance: 75,935; Referee: David Fernández Borbalán (Andalusia) |

| 27 February 2010 24 | Barcelona | 2–1 | Málaga | Barcelona |
| 22:00 CET (UTC+01:00) | Piqué (yellow card) 42'; Pedro 69'; Messi 84' | Report | Torres (yellow card) 37'; Valdo 81' | Stadium: Camp Nou; Attendance: 64,837; Referee: Antonio Rubinos Pérez (Community of Madrid) |

| 7 March 2010 25 | Almería | 2–2 | Barcelona | Almería |
| 20:00 CET (UTC+01:00) | Cisma 12'; Puyol 57' (o.g.) | (Report) | Messi 42', 66'; Ibrahimović (red card) 60' | Stadium: Juegos Mediterráneos; Attendance: 10,000; Referee: Carlos Clos Gómez (Aragon) |

| 14 March 2010 26 | Barcelona | 3–0 | Valencia | Barcelona |
| 19:00 CET (UTC+01:00) | Messi 56', 81', 83'; Piqué (yellow card) 90' | Report | Banega (yellow card) 47'; Maduro (yellow card) 54' (yellow-red card) 69'; Dealbert (yellow card) 62'; Bruno (yellow card) 71'; Žigić (yellow card) 90' | Stadium: Camp Nou; Attendance: 87,600; Referee: César Muñiz Fernández (Asturias) |

| 21 March 2010 27 | Zaragoza | 2–4 | Barcelona | Zaragoza |
| 21:00 CET (UTC+01:00) | Jarošík (yellow card) 43'; Diogo (yellow card) 74'; Colunga 85', 89'; Contini (yellow card) 90' | Report | Messi 5', 66', 78'; Touré (yellow card) 39'; Maxwell (yellow card) 76'; Alves (yellow card) 84'; Ibrahimović 90+1' (pen.) | Stadium: La Romareda; Attendance: 30,000; Referee: Carlos Delgado Ferreiro (Basque Country) |

| 24 March 2010 28 | Barcelona | 2–0 | Osasuna | Barcelona |
| 20:00 CET (UTC+01:00) | Busquets (yellow card) 39'; Iniesta (yellow card) 51'; Alves (yellow card) 70'; Ibrahimović 73'; Messi (yellow card) 85'; Bojan 89' | Report | Puñal (yellow card) 46'; Josetxo (yellow card) 76' | Stadium: Camp Nou; Attendance: 70,645; Referee: Carlos Velasco Carballo (Community of Madrid) |

| 27 March 2010 29 | Mallorca | 0–1 | Barcelona | Palma |
| 20:00 CET (UTC+01:00) | Ramis (yellow card) 44'; Suárez (yellow card) 55'; Aduriz (yellow card) 60'; Castro (yellow card) 79' | Report | Milito (yellow card) 34'; Ibrahimović 63'; Keita (yellow card) 84'; Alves (yellow card) 90' | Stadium: Iberostar; Attendance: 23,000; Referee: David Fernández Borbalán (Andalusia) |

| 3 April 2010 30 | Barcelona | 4–1 | Athletic Bilbao | Barcelona |
| 20:00 CEST (UTC+02:00) | Jeffrén 27'; Bojan 40', 59'; Touré (yellow card) 61'; Messi 67' | Report | Martínez (yellow card) 61'; Susaeta 77' | Stadium: Camp Nou; Attendance: 77,630; Referee: Antonio Mateu Lahoz (Valencian Community) |

| 10 April 2010 31 | Real Madrid | 0–2 | Barcelona | Madrid |
| 22:00 CEST (UTC+02:00) | Alonso (yellow card) 13'; Albiol (yellow card) 30'; Ramos (yellow card) 61'; Garay (yellow card) 84' | Report | Messi (yellow card) 20', (goal) 33'; Xavi (yellow card) 31'; Alves (yellow card) 39'; Maxwell (yellow card) 52'; Pedro 56' | Stadium: Santiago Bernabéu; Attendance: 80,000; Referee: Manuel Mejuto González (Asturias) |

| 14 April 2010 32 | Barcelona | 3–0 | Deportivo La Coruña | Barcelona |
| 22:00 CEST (UTC+02:00) | Bojan 16'; Pedro 69'; Touré 72' | Report | Lopo (yellow card) 13'; Álvarez (yellow card) 30'; Manuel Pablo (yellow card) 79' | Stadium: Camp Nou; Attendance: 75,897; Referee: José Luis Paradas Romero (Andalusia) |

| 17 April 2010 33 | Espanyol | 0–0 | Barcelona | Cornellà de Llobregat |
| 20:00 CEST (UTC+02:00) | Osvaldo (yellow card) 6'; García (yellow card) 22'; Baena (yellow card) 63' | Report | Alves (yellow card) 25' (yellow-red card) 62'; Milito (yellow card) 32'; Keita (yellow card) 81' | Stadium: Cornellà-El Prat; Attendance: 39,263; Referee: Alberto Undiano Mallenco (Navarre) |

| 24 April 2010 34 | Barcelona | 3–1 | Xerez | Barcelona |
| 18:00 CEST (UTC+02:00) | Jeffrén 14'; Henry 24'; Ibrahimović 56'; Bojan (yellow card) 78' | Report | Aythami (yellow card) 16'; Bermejo 25', (yellow card) 83'; Sánchez (yellow card) 27'; Casado (yellow card) 67'; Orellana (yellow card) 72' (red card) 90+3'; Renan (yellow card) 82'; Moreno (yellow card) 88'; Alustiza (red card) 90'; Gioda (yellow card) 90+1'; Calvo (yellow card) 90+1' | Stadium: Camp Nou; Attendance: 82,456; Referee: César Muñiz Fernández (Asturias) |

| 1 May 2010 35 | Villarreal | 1–4 | Barcelona | Villarreal |
| 22:00 CEST (UTC+02:00) | Gonzalo (yellow card) 32'; Capdevila (yellow card) 40'; Godín (yellow card) 55'; Llorente 67' | Report | Messi 19', 88'; Xavi 34'; Bojan 42'; Keita (yellow card) 52'; Busquets (yellow card) 62'; Puyol (yellow card) 72' | Stadium: El Madrigal; Attendance: 20,000; Referee: Fernando Teixeira Vitienes (Cantabria) |

| 4 May 2010 36 | Barcelona | 4–1 | Tenerife | Barcelona |
| 20:00 CEST (UTC+02:00) | Messi 17', 90+3'; Bojan 63'; Pedro 77' | Report | Sicilia (yellow card) 25'; Martínez 39'; Alfaro (yellow card) 68'; Héctor (yellow card) 71' | Stadium: Camp Nou; Attendance: 57,401; Referee: Carlos Delgado Ferreiro (Basque Country) |

| 8 May 2010 37 | Sevilla | 2–3 | Barcelona | Seville |
| 21:00 CEST (UTC+02:00) | Konko (yellow card) 11' (yellow-red card) 56'; Luís Fabiano (yellow card) 30', (goal) 71'; Zokora (yellow card) 42'; Kanouté 69'; Lolo (yellow card) 74'; Capel (yellow card) 78' | Report | Messi 5'; Busquets (yellow card) 22'; Bojan 28', (yellow card) 86'; Pedro (yellow card) 44', (goal) 62'; Maxwell (yellow card) 54'; Xavi (yellow card) 72'; Valdés (yellow card) 90+2' | Stadium: Ramón Sánchez Pizjuán; Attendance: 45,000; Referee: Alberto Undiano Mallenco (Navarre) |

| 16 May 2010 38 | Barcelona | 4–0 | Real Valladolid | Barcelona |
| 19:00 CEST (UTC+02:00) | Prieto 27' (o.g.); Pedro 31'; Messi 62', 76'; Alves (yellow card) 68' | Report | Barragán (yellow card) 44'; Manucho (yellow card) 48'; Baraja (yellow card) 54' | Stadium: Camp Nou; Attendance: 98,083; Referee: Miguel Ángel Pérez Lasa (Basque Country) |

=== Copa del Rey ===
==== Round of 32 ====
| 28 October 2009 First leg | Cultural Leonesa | 0–2 | Barcelona | León |
| 20:00 CET (UTC+01:00) | Gorka (yellow card) 86'; Segovia (yellow card) 90' | (Report) | Jeffrén (yellow card) 31'; Pedro 41', 63' | Stadium: Estadio Reino de León; Attendance: 13,451; Referee: Bernardino González Vázquez (Galicia) |

| 10 November 2009 Second leg | Barcelona | 5–0 (7–0 agg.) | Cultural Leonesa | Barcelona |
| 22:00 CET (UTC+01:00) | Bojan 52', 54'; Pedro 63'; Messi 64'; Xavi 75' | (Report) | Cerveró (yellow card) 40' | Stadium: Camp Nou; Attendance: 26,322; Referee: Miguel Ángel Ayza Gámez (Valencian Community) |

==== Round of 16 ====
| 5 January 2010 First leg | Barcelona | 1–2 | Sevilla | Barcelona |
| 22:00 CET (UTC+01:00) | Thiago (yellow card) 40'; Márquez (yellow card) 42'; Milito (yellow card) 52'; Ibrahimović 74'; Chyhrynskyi (yellow card) 75' | Report | Escudé (yellow card) 42'; Navarro (yellow card) 53'; Capel 60'; Lolo (yellow card) 66'; Negredo 76' (pen.) | Stadium: Camp Nou; Attendance: 48,167; Referee: Alfonso Pérez Burrull (Cantabria) |

| 13 January 2010 Second leg | Sevilla | 0–1 (2a–2 agg.) | Barcelona | Seville |
| 22:00 CET (UTC+01:00) | Duscher (yellow card) 51'; Lolo (yellow card) 63'; Navas (yellow card) 68'; Navarro (yellow card) 84'; Romaric (yellow card) 90+1' | Report | Xavi 64'; Messi (yellow card) 71'; Henry (yellow card) 90+3'; Piqué (yellow card) 90+3' | Stadium: Ramón Sánchez Pizjuán; Attendance: 35,000; Referee: Carlos Clos Gómez (Aragon) |

=== UEFA Champions League ===
==== Group stage ====
| Pos | Team | Pld | W | D | L | GF | GA | GD | Pts | Qualification |
|---|---|---|---|---|---|---|---|---|---|---|
| 1 | (Spain) Barcelona | 6 | 3 | 2 | 1 | 7 | 3 | +4 | 11 | Advance to knockout phase |
| 2 | (Italy) Inter Milan | 6 | 2 | 3 | 1 | 7 | 6 | +1 | 9 | Advance to knockout phase |
| 3 | (Russia) Rubin Kazan | 6 | 1 | 3 | 2 | 4 | 7 | −3 | 6 | Transfer to Europa League |
| 4 | (Ukraine) Dynamo Kyiv | 6 | 1 | 2 | 3 | 7 | 9 | −2 | 5 | |

Source: RSSSF

| 16 September 2009 1 | Inter Milan (Italy) | 0–0 | (Spain) Barcelona | Milan, Italy |
| 20:45 CEST (UTC+02:00) | Chivu (yellow card) 90' | Report | Henry (yellow card) 54'; Touré (yellow card) 83' | Stadium: San Siro; Attendance: 85,700; Referee: Wolfgang Stark (Germany) |

| 29 September 2009 2 | Barcelona (Spain) | 2–0 | (Ukraine) Dynamo Kyiv | Barcelona, Spain |
| 20:45 CEST (UTC+02:00) | Messi 26'; Pedro 76' | Report | Magrão (yellow card) 37'; Almeida (yellow card) 55' | Stadium: Camp Nou; Attendance: 68,221; Referee: Björn Kuipers (Netherlands) |

| 20 October 2009 3 | Barcelona (Spain) | 1–2 | (Russia) Rubin Kazan | Barcelona, Spain |
| 20:45 CEST (UTC+02:00) | Iniesta (yellow card) 43'; Ibrahimović 48'; Alves (yellow card) 88' | Report | Ryazantsev 2'; Karadeniz 73'; Murawski (yellow card) 78'; Ansaldi (yellow card) 90' | Stadium: Camp Nou; Attendance: 55,930; Referee: Laurent Duhamel (France) |

| 4 November 2009 4 | Rubin Kazan (Russia) | 0–0 | (Spain) Barcelona | Kazan, Russia |
| 20:45 CET (UTC+01:00) | Semak (yellow card) 73'; Ryzhikov (yellow card) 90+1' | Report | Puyol (yellow card) 75' | Stadium: Central Stadium; Attendance: 30,133; Referee: Konrad Plautz (Austria) |

| 24 November 2009 5 | Barcelona (Spain) | 2–0 | (Italy) Inter Milan | Barcelona, Spain |
| 20:45 CET (UTC+01:00) | Piqué 10'; Pedro 26', (yellow card) 50'; Puyol (yellow card) 34' | Report | Motta (yellow card) 18'; Chivu (yellow card) 80'; Zanetti (yellow card) 89' | Stadium: Camp Nou; Attendance: 93,524; Referee: Massimo Busacca (Switzerland) |

| 9 December 2009 6 | Dynamo Kyiv (Ukraine) | 1–2 | (Spain) Barcelona | Kyiv, Ukraine |
| 20:45 CET (UTC+01:00) | Milevskyi 2'; Almeida (yellow card) 52'; Vukojević (yellow card) 55'; Mykhalyk (yellow card) 78'; Shevchenko (yellow card) 88' | Report | Xavi 33', (yellow card) 81'; Piqué (yellow card) 45'; Ibrahimović (yellow card) 77'; Messi 86' | Stadium: Lobanovsky Dynamo Stadium; Attendance: 16,900; Referee: Howard Webb (England) |

==== Knockout phase ====
===== Round of 16 =====
| 23 February 2010 First leg | VfB Stuttgart (Germany) | 1–1 | (Spain) Barcelona | Stuttgart, Germany |
| 20:45 CET (UTC+01:00) | Cacau 25'; Genhart (yellow card) 51'; Molinaro (yellow card) 84' | Report | Márquez (yellow card) 22'; Ibrahimović 52'; Piqué (yellow card) 90+1' | Stadium: Mercedes-Benz Arena; Attendance: 40,000; Referee: Björn Kuipers (Netherlands) |

| 17 March 2010 Second leg | Barcelona (Spain) | 4–0 (5–1 agg.) | (Germany) VfB Stuttgart | Barcelona, Spain |
| 20:45 CET (UTC+01:00) | Messi 13', 60'; Pedro 22'; Bojan 89' | Report | Lehmann (yellow card) 43'; Pogrebnyak (yellow card) 45'; Kuzmanović (yellow card) 54' | Stadium: Camp Nou; Attendance: 88,543; Referee: Alain Hamer (Luxembourg) |

===== Quarter-finals =====
| 31 March 2010 First leg | Arsenal (England) | 2–2 | (Spain) Barcelona | London, England |
| 20:45 CEST (UTC+02:00) | Arshavin (yellow card) 21'; Song (yellow card) 40'; Fàbregas (yellow card) 44', (goal) 85' (pen.); Walcott 69'; Eboué (yellow card) 74'; Diaby (yellow card) 79' | Report | Ibrahimović 46', 59'; Piqué (yellow card) 72'; Puyol (red card) 84' | Stadium: Emirates Stadium; Attendance: 59,572; Referee: Massimo Busacca (Switzerland) |

| 6 April 2010 Second leg | Barcelona (Spain) | 4–1 (6–3 agg.) | (England) Arsenal | Barcelona, Spain |
| 20:45 CEST (UTC+02:00) | Messi 21', 37', 42', 88' | Report | Bendtner 18'; Denílson (yellow card) 31'; Rosický (yellow card) 44'; Eboué (yellow card) 67' | Stadium: Camp Nou; Attendance: 93,330; Referee: Wolfgang Stark (Germany) |

===== Semi-finals =====
| 20 April 2010 First leg | Inter Milan (Italy) | 3–1 | (Spain) Barcelona | Milan, Italy |
| 20:45 CEST (UTC+02:00) | Eto'o (yellow card) 12'; Sneijder 30'; Maicon 48'; Milito 61'; Stanković (yellow card) 82' | Report | Pedro 19'; Busquets (yellow card) 45+1'; Puyol (yellow card) 51'; Piqué (yellow card) 60'; Keita (yellow card) 68'; Alves (yellow card) 84' | Stadium: San Siro; Attendance: 83,000; Referee: Olegário Benquerença (Portugal) |

| 28 April 2010 Second leg | Barcelona (Spain) | 1–0 (2–3 agg.) | (Italy) Inter Milan | Barcelona, Spain |
| 20:45 CEST (UTC+02:00) | Pedro (yellow card) 27'; Piqué 84' | Report | Motta (yellow card) 10' (red card) 28'; Júlio César (yellow card) 35'; Chivu (yellow card) 43'; Lúcio (yellow card) 82'; Muntari (yellow card) 83' | Stadium: Camp Nou; Attendance: 96,214; Referee: Frank De Bleeckere (Belgium) |
