= Luis Candendo Pérez =

Spanish politician (1936 – 1978)

Luis Candendo Pérez (Las Cortes, 1936 – Anzuola, 1978) was a Spanish politician victim of ETA's terrorism.

== Biography ==
Luis Candendo Pérez was a member of the political party UCD, born in Orense in 1935 and resident in Vergara, Guipuzcoa. ETA killed him on November 9, 1978, in the town of Anzuola. He was married, and he had three children.

=== Murder ===
Luis Candendo was killed on his way home. His spouse used to give him his lunch outside of their home. The murder occurred while she was delivering the food. A terrorist started to shoot from the right side of the windshield. At that moment, Luis Candendo tried to escape while his spouse took refuge inside the home's doorway. When he tried to open the door of the vehicle, a second guy shot against him. Both individuals immediately run away. Eight of the shoots reached the body of Luis Candendo. The investigators found out that the vehicle used to commit the attack was an orange-pink Simca 120. The car was stolen at gunpoint near the football ground of the same locality that had placed the attack, and it was later found in Vergara. The owner of the car was told to not advise the police until 22:00 p.m.

Luis Candendo was the first attack against UCD's militant. Subsequently, other militants of the same formation would be murdered, abducted or would be wounded by ETA's attack.

ETA's military claimed this murder two days later through a release. In this statement, the terrorist group accused Luis of being a confident and collaborator of the repressive forces of Basque Country.

There is no evidence of the existence of any condemnation for this attack. According to the Ministry of Peace and Coexistence of the Basque Government, the procedural status of the offence is in provisional dismissal.

== Bibliography ==
- ANGULO ALTUBE, GORKA., La persecución de ETA a la derecha vasca. pp. 233–238. Editorial Almuzara (2018). ISBN 978-84-17418-25-0
