= Take the Ball Pass the Ball =

- Release poster
- Toca y pasa el balón
- Directed by: Duncan McMath
- Produced by: Graham Hunter; Duncan McMath; Marc Guillén
- Starring: Lionel Messi; Xavi; Andrés Iniesta; Gerard Piqué; Carles Puyol; Victor Valdés; Sergio Busquets; Javier Mascherano; Dani Alves; Eric Abidal; Samuel Eto’o; Jordi Cruyff; Michael Carrick; Fabio Capello; Eiður Guðjohnsen; Thierry Henry
- Edited by: Victor Gros
- Production company: Zoom Sport International
- Release date: 9 November 2018
- Running time: 109 minutes
- Country: Spain

Take The Ball Pass The Ball is a 2018 Spanish documentary film, released on 9 November 2018 and directed by Duncan McMath. The film mainly focuses on FC Barcelona's success under manager Pep Guardiola from 2008 to 2012 where the team won a total of 14 trophies. The film is based on the book Barça: The Making of the Greatest Team in the World by football journalist Graham Hunter.

== Synopsis ==
The documentary features interviews and analysis from players, coaches, staff and journalists along with match footages.

The film documents Barcelona's 2010–11 UEFA Champions League triumph, the intense rivalry with Real Madrid and then coach José Mourinho, Eric Abidal's comeback from cancer to play football again, the influence of Johan Cryuff on Barcelona and its style of play where the club won its first European trophy, the making of Lionel Messi, the days under manager Frank Rijkaard and appointment of Pep Guardiola as manager and the final season under Guardiola when he announced his departure from the club. The documentary ends with an interview with Guardiola who gives his views on his four years at Barcelona.

== Release ==
The film was first released in selected cinemas in United Kingdom and Spain on 9 November 2018 and was later available on DVD and digital download on 12 November 2018.
