= Gai Assulin =

Israeli professional footballer

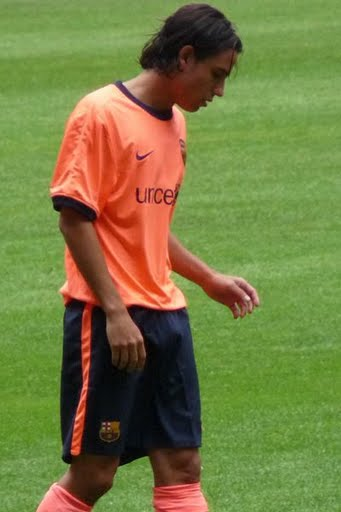
- Assulin with Barcelona in 2009

Personal information
- Full name: Gai Yigaal Assulin
- Date of birth: 9 April 1991 (age 35)
- Place of birth: Nahariya, Israel
- Height: 1.77 m (5 ft 10 in)
- Positions: Winger; attacking midfielder

Youth career
- 1997–1999: Hapoel Haifa
- 1999–2003: Beitar Nes Tubruk
- 2003–2007: Barcelona

Senior career*
Years	Team	Apps	(Gls)
2007–2010	Barcelona B	67	(13)
2009–2010	Barcelona	0	(0)
2010–2012	Manchester City	0	(0)
2012	→ Brighton & Hove Albion (loan)	7	(0)
2012–2013	Racing Santander	25	(3)
2013–2014	Granada	0	(0)
2013–2014	Mallorca	32	(3)
2014–2015	Hapoel Tel Aviv	6	(0)
2015–2016	Sabadell		(0)
2018	Kairat	6	(0)
2019–2021	Politehnica Iași	14	(2)
2021	Crema		

International career
2008–2013	Israel U21	22	(0)
2008	Israel	1	(0)
- * Club domestic league appearances and goals as of 17 February 2021

Gai Yigaal Assulin (Hebrew: גיא יגאל אסולין; born 9 April 1991) is an Israeli professional footballer who plays as a winger or an attacking midfielder. He last played for Serie D club Crema.

As a teenager, he was registered at Barcelona and Manchester City, but did not make a league appearance for either team. He subsequently became a journeyman, spending short spells at a variety of teams mostly in Spain.

Assulin was capped 22 times by the Israel national under-21 team and once in 2008 by the senior team, becoming their youngest player of all time.

== Early life ==
Assulin was born in Nahariya, Israel. He started his career in the football school of Hapoel Haifa. In 1999, at age seven, he moved to the Beitar Tubruk youth ranks. In 2003, when he was just 12, Shlomo Scharf, his team coach, proposed to Assulin's parents to consider taking their young prospect to try out for FC Barcelona, where he was accepted into the youth ranks.

== Club career ==
=== Barcelona ===
In August 2007, Assulin graduated to the FC Barcelona B team, and was offered a new contract, a senior contract (a contract granted only after the player turns 16) for another three years and a €20 million buy-out clause. At the end of the 2007–08 season, Barcelona B won the league title with 83 points, and the manager, Pep Guardiola, was promoted to the job of senior team manager. Assulin was rumored to be one of the players that Guardiola would promote to the first team.

After missing most of the 2008–09 season due to injury, Assulin received an invitation to participate in pre-season matches with the Barcelona first team. He made his debut first-team start in a competitive match of the Copa del Rey against Cultural Leonesa on 28 October 2009, before being replaced by Eric Abidal after 56 minutes. Due to the lengthy 2009–10 season, many Barcelona players were given breaks towards the end of the year, so on 29 December 2009 Guardiola brought in Assulin and his teammates Víctor Vázquez, Thiago Alcântara and Jonathan dos Santos.

On 1 July 2010, Assulin and Barcelona parted ways by mutual consent. They offered him a three-year contract but as they could not offer him a guaranteed first-team squad position and instead sought to develop him at Barcelona B, he refused the offer. Assulin also had a complicated relationship with the manager of Barcelona B, Luis Enrique.

=== Manchester City ===
On 14 December 2010, Assulin joined Premier League club Manchester City on a two-and-a-half-year deal. He spoke of his wishes to partner his former Barcelona teammate Yaya Touré at the club.

The early part of 2011 saw Assulin make his City Reserve squad debut against Newcastle United, coming on as a second-half substitute in a 5–1 win.

On 17 November 2011, Assulin declared that he was prepared to be loaned out from Manchester City in order to receive first-team action. He had so far failed to receive a call-up from first-team manager Roberto Mancini but was too old to play in the inaugural under-19 NextGen series with the City Elite Development Squad, restricting him to playing occasionally for the Reserves. Assulin said: "I need confidence and I can only get that by playing regularly. City and I both feel that I should go out on loan so I can play every week. I could stay in England or maybe join a team in the Spanish second division". Six days later, Championship side Barnsley announced that they had agreed a loan deal until 3 January 2012, with their manager Keith Hill saying that he was impressed by his performance for Israel under-21 against England at the club's Oakwell ground that September. After fitness issues came up, the deal collapsed.

On 9 February 2012, Assulin scored for the Manchester City Elite Development Squad in their 4–2 derby win over rivals Manchester United. He entered the Manchester Senior Cup tie at half-time as a substitute for Denis Suárez, and scored their 2–2 equaliser in the 65th minute and he also assisted for the fourth goal in stoppage time.

Eight days later, Assulin, along with fellow City youngster Abdul Razak, joined Championship side Brighton & Hove Albion on an initial one-month loan until 19 March, but with the option to extend this by two months. Manager Gustavo Poyet described the loan move for Assulin as a "no-brainer" and a "unique opportunity." Assulin made his Brighton debut on 22 February against Hull City, coming on as a substitute for Razak in the 77th minute of their 0–0 draw. He made his first start against Cardiff City on 7 March and was substituted after 59 minutes of a 2–2 home draw. On 19 March, after one start and three substitute appearances, Brighton exercised their option to extend Assulin's loan deal until the end of the season.

Assulin was released from Manchester City on 22 May 2012, alongside Owen Hargreaves.

=== Later career ===
On 11 July 2012, Assulin signed a one-year deal with recently relegated Racing de Santander. Six days later, he was introduced as a player in a press conference. On the opening game of the season on 19 August, he made his debut in a 1–0 loss against Las Palmas; he soon scored his first goal, on 15 September, in a 3–0 win over Recreativo de Huelva, giving the club their first win of the campaign.

On 5 July 2013, Assulin signed a three-year deal with Granada CF, being immediately loaned to Segunda División's Hércules CF in a season-long deal. He appeared regularly for the Valencian outfit, which were relegated after finishing dead last. In his second game, a goalless draw at CD Tenerife on 25 August, he was sent off for kicking out at Carlos Ruiz.

On 15 August 2014, Assulin signed a two-year deal with RCD Mallorca, also in the second level.

In October 2015, free agent Assulin trialled with Rangers of the Scottish Championship; Manager Mark Warburton was not sufficiently impressed to offer him a contract. After a brief spell at Hapoel Tel Aviv – his first experience of the Israeli Premier League – he went back to Spain to sign for CE Sabadell FC in the third tier on 10 August 2016. He departed the Catalan club in January 2018 after his contract was terminated by mutual consent.

On 13 February 2018, Kazakhstan Premier League side FC Kairat announced the signing of Assulin on a two-year contract. On 30 March, it was cancelled by mutual consent.

On 26 September 2019, Assulin signed a two-year contract with Liga I club Politehnica Iași.

On 13 February 2021, he was announced as a new player for Italy's Serie D club Crema. He left the club by the end of the season.

== International career ==
Assulin was called up by the Israel national team for their friendly match against Chile on March 26, 2008. He debuted for Israel as a substitute in the 78th minute of the friendly, 14 days before his 17th birthday. By playing in this match, he broke Ben Sahar's record for youngest national team debut by 195 days. He went on to represent the Israeli under-21 national team in preparation at the 2013 UEFA European Under-21 Football Championship, hosted in the country.

== Career statistics ==
=== Club ===
As of match played 11 March 2018

Appearances and goals by club, season and competition
Club	Season	League			National Cup		League Cup		Continental		Other		Total	
Club	Season	Division	Apps	Goals	Apps	Goals	Apps	Goals	Apps	Goals	Apps	Goals	Apps	Goals
Barcelona B	2007–08	Tercera División	22	10	–		–		–		–		0	0
Barcelona B	2008–09	Segunda División B	20	1	–		–		–		–		0	0
Barcelona B	2009–10	Segunda División B	25	2	–		–		–		–		0	0
Barcelona B	Total		67	13	0	0	0	0	0	0	0	0	67	13
Barcelona	2009–10	La Liga	0	0	1	0	–		0	0	0	0	1	0
Brighton & Hove Albion (loan)	2011–12	Championship	7	0	0	0	0	0	–		–		7	0
Racing de Santander	2012–13	Segunda División	26	3	0	0	–		–		–		26	3
Hércules (loan)	2013–14	Segunda División	32	3	2	0	–		–		–		34	3
Mallorca	2013–14	Segunda División	6	0	1	0	–		–		–		7	0
Hapoel Tel Aviv	2015–16	Israeli Premier League	7	0	1	0	0	0	–		–		8	0
Sabadell	2016–17	Segunda División	18	2	0	0	–		–		–		18	2
Sabadell	2017–18	Segunda División	8	1	0	0	–		–		–		8	1
Sabadell	Total		26	3	0	0	0	0	0	0	0	0	26	3
Kairat	2018	Kazakhstan Premier League	1	0	0	0	–		0	0	1	0	2	0
Career total			172	22	5	0	0	0	0	0	1	0	177	22

== See also ==
- List of select Jewish football (association; soccer) players
- List of Jewish footballers
