= Wembley Cup =

Invitational football tournament

- Founded: 2009
- Region: Europe
- Current champions: (Scotland) Celtic (1st title)
- Most championships: (Scotland) Celtic (1 title)

The Wembley Cup was an invitational football tournament. The only edition for professional teams was the first edition of the tournament which took place between 24 and 26 July 2009 at Wembley Stadium, Wembley Park, London, United Kingdom. The winning team was Celtic, ahead of Barcelona, Tottenham Hotspur, and Al Ahly. Each team played two matches, with three points awarded for a win and one point for a draw. Each goal was rewarded with a point and each one conceded saw a point deducted.

== Wembley Cup 2009 ==
24 July 2009
17:15 BST

| Celtic (Scotland) | 5–0 | (Egypt) Al Ahly |
|---|---|---|
| Donati 31'; McDonald 39' (pen.), 58'; Maloney 49'; Killen 83' | Report |

Wembley Stadium, London
Attendance: 57,932
Referee: Lee Probert
24 July 2009
20:00 BST

| Barcelona (Spain) | 1–1 | (England) Tottenham Hotspur |
|---|---|---|
| Bojan 32' | Report | Livermore 83' |

Wembley Stadium, London
Attendance: 57,932
Referee: Mark Halsey

26 July 2009
13:15 BST

| Al Ahly (Egypt) | 1–4 | (Spain) Barcelona |
|---|---|---|
| El-Agazy 31' | Report | Bojan 16'; Rueda 41'; Jeffrén 56'; Pedro 67' |

Wembley Stadium, London
Attendance: 64,562
Referee: Chris Foy
26 July 2009
16:00 BST

| Tottenham Hotspur (England) | 0–2 | (Scotland) Celtic |
|---|---|---|
| | Report | Killen 9'; Samaras 40' |

Wembley Stadium, London
Attendance: 64,562
Referee: Alan Wiley

=== Standings ===
| P | Team | Games | W | D | L | GF | GA | GD | Pts |
|---|---|---|---|---|---|---|---|---|---|
| 1 | (Scotland) Celtic | 2 | 2 | 0 | 0 | 7 | 0 | +7 | 6 |
| 2 | (Spain) Barcelona | 2 | 1 | 1 | 0 | 5 | 2 | +3 | 4 |
| 3 | (England) Tottenham Hotspur | 2 | 0 | 1 | 1 | 1 | 3 | −2 | 4 |
| 4 | (Egypt) Al Ahly | 2 | 0 | 0 | 2 | 1 | 9 | −8 | 0 |

=== Goalscorers ===
| Goals | Player | Team |
|---|---|---|
| 2 | (Australia) Scott McDonald | (Scotland) Celtic |
| 2 | (Spain) Bojan Krkić | (Spain) Barcelona |
| 2 | (New Zealand) Chris Killen | (Scotland) Celtic |
| 1 | (Italy) Massimo Donati | (Scotland) Celtic |
| 1 | (Egypt) Hany El-Agazy | (Egypt) Al Ahly |
| 1 | (Scotland) Shaun Maloney | (Scotland) Celtic |
| 1 | (England) Jake Livermore | (England) Tottenham Hotspur |
| 1 | (Spain) Pedro | (Spain) Barcelona |
| 1 | (Spain) José Manuel Rueda | (Spain) Barcelona |
| 1 | (Spain) Jeffrén Suárez | (Spain) Barcelona |
| 1 | (Greece) Georgios Samaras | (Scotland) Celtic |

== Subsequent tournaments ==
In the last match of the inaugural Wembley Cup (2009) it was announced that the success of the tournament had encouraged organisers to confirm a second edition of the competition in the summer of 2010. However the 2010 tournament did not take place and the Wembley Cup has not been staged again for professional teams.
