= Gorka García =

Spanish footballer

Personal information
- Full name: Gorka García Zubikarai
- Date of birth: 8 February 1975 (age 51)
- Place of birth: Antzuola, Spain
- Height: 1.77 m (5 ft 10 in)
- Position: Wingback

Senior career*
Years	Team	Apps	(Gls)
1996–1997	Laudio		
1997–1999	Amurrio	65	(2)
1999–2000	Eibar	41	(2)
2000–2002	Levante	63	(0)
2002–2003	Córdoba	37	(3)
2003–2004	Osasuna	10	(0)
2004–2005	Córdoba	9	(0)
2005–2007	Lorca Deportiva	24	(1)
2007–2010	Cultural Leonesa	95	(0)
Total		344	(8)
- * Club domestic league appearances and goals

Gorka García Zubikarai (born 8 February 1975) is a Spanish retired footballer. On the left side of the pitch, he could operate as both a defender or a midfielder.

== Football career ==
García was born in Antzuola, Gipuzkoa. In the 2003–04 season, he played ten matches in La Liga for CA Osasuna – four as a starter – as the Navarrese finished 13th, but spent the bulk of his professional career in the second division, appearing in 175 games in representation of four clubs and retiring well into his 30s.

García made his debut in the Spanish top level on 20 September 2003, coming on as a second-half substitute in a 1–1 away draw against FC Barcelona.
