= Jeffrén Suárez =

Venezuelan footballer (born 1988)

Jeffrén
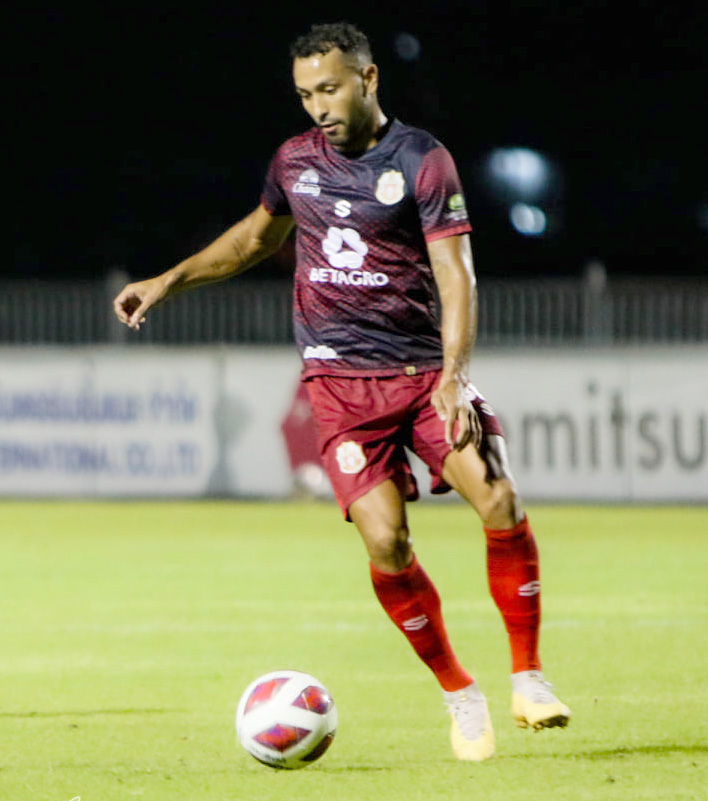
- Jeffrén with Lamphun Warriors in 2021

Personal information
- Full name: Jeffrén Isaac Suárez Bermúdez
- Date of birth: 20 January 1988 (age 38)
- Place of birth: Ciudad Bolívar, Venezuela
- Height: 1.75 m (5 ft 9 in)
- Positions: Forward; winger

Youth career
- 2003–2004: Tenerife
- 2004–2007: Barcelona

Senior career*
| Years | Team | Apps | (Gls) |
| 2006–2007 | Barcelona C | 7 | (1) |
| 2006–2009 | Barcelona B | 82 | (14) |
| 2008–2011 | Barcelona | 22 | (3) |
| 2011–2014 | Sporting CP | 24 | (5) |
| 2014–2015 | Valladolid | 46 | (3) |
| 2015–2017 | Eupen | 36 | (3) |
| 2017–2019 | Grasshoppers | 42 | (5) |
| 2019 | AEK Larnaca | 14 | (0) |
| 2020–2021 | Slaven Belupo | 19 | (1) |
| 2021 | Al Dhaid | 4 | (5) |
| 2021–2023 | Lamphun Warriors | 44 | (14) |
| 2023–2024 | Chiangmai United | 28 | (5) |
| Total | | 368 | (59) |

International career
| 2004 | Spain U16 | 3 | (0) |
| 2004–2005 | Spain U17 | 3 | (0) |
| 2006–2007 | Spain U19 | 11 | (5) |
| 2007 | Spain U20 | 1 | (0) |
| 2009–2011 | Spain U21 | 12 | (2) |
| 2015–2016 | Venezuela | 4 | (0) |

Managerial career
- 2024: Chiangmai United
Medal record
Men's football
Representing Spain
UEFA European Under-19 Championship
| Winner | 2006 Poland |
UEFA European Under-21 Championship
| Winner | 2011 Denmark |
- * Club domestic league appearances and goals

Jeffrén Isaac Suárez Bermúdez (born 20 January 1988), known simply as Jeffrén, is a Venezuelan former professional footballer who played as a forward or a winger.

He started his career with Barcelona, appearing rarely and signing for Sporting CP in 2011. Other than in Spain, he also played in Portugal, Belgium, Switzerland, Cyprus, Croatia, the United Arab Emirates and Thailand.

Jeffrén won 30 caps for Spain at youth level, winning the European Championships with the under-19 and the under-21 teams. In 2015, he made his senior debut for Venezuela.

== Early life ==
Born in Ciudad Bolívar, Venezuela, Jeffrén was just one year old when his family left the country for the Spanish island of Tenerife.

FC Barcelona talent scouts spotted him and, in 2004, he was signed for its youth teams from CD Tenerife, first being coached by Guillermo Hoyos, who played him as a midfielder.

== Club career ==
=== Barcelona ===
Jeffrén played three full seasons with FC Barcelona B, suffering Segunda División B relegation in 2006–07 and scoring six goals in 30 games the following season in an immediate promotion. On 8 November 2006, at the age of 18, he made his debut with the first team, against CF Badalona in a Copa del Rey round-of-32 match, coming on as a substitute for Javier Saviola in the 83rd minute of a 4–0 home win (6–1 on aggregate).

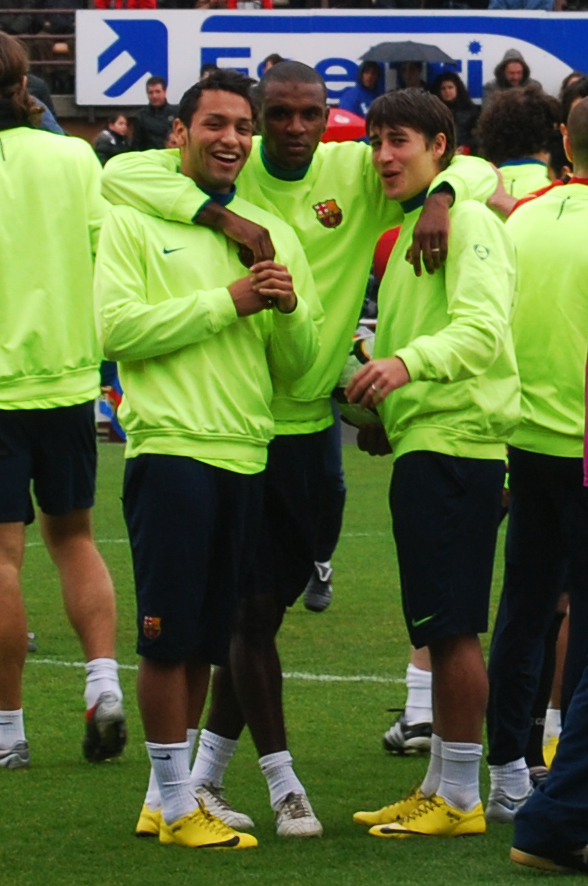
Jeffrén during a Barcelona training session, alongside teammates Eric Abidal and Bojan.

Impressed at the player's performance for the reserves, first-team manager Pep Guardiola called Jeffrén for the 2008–09 pre-season, where he played all seven matches scoring twice, including once on 30 July against ACF Fiorentina in the 47th minute of a 3–1 victory. On 17 May 2009, he made his first La Liga appearance (of two in the season), as already crowned champions Barcelona lost 1–2 at RCD Mallorca.

On 19 December 2009, Jeffrén replaced Thierry Henry late into the FIFA Club World Cup final against Estudiantes de La Plata. Two days later, he picked up a leg muscle injury that left him out for 4–5 weeks in a 1–1 friendly draw with Kazma SC in Kuwait, in commemoration of the Asian side's 45th anniversary.

On 10 February 2010, Barcelona announced Jeffrén had signed a contract extension with the club, keeping him at the Camp Nou until 30 June 2012 with a buyout clause set at €10 million. On the 14th, he started as right-back in a 2–1 loss at Atlético Madrid.

On 3 April 2010, Jeffrén scored his first top-division goal after a low cross from Eric Abidal, in a 4–1 home defeat of Athletic Bilbao. On the 24th he added another in spectacular fashion, in a 3–1 home win over Xerez CD and, as the Catalans renewed their domestic supremacy, finished the campaign with 18 official appearances.

Jeffrén appeared less for Barça's first team in 2010–11. On 29 November 2010, he came from the bench to close the scoring in El Clásico against Real Madrid, in a 5–0 home victory.

=== Sporting CP ===
On 4 August 2011, Sporting CP signed Jeffrén for €3.75 million, plus €200,000 in bonus. He penned a five-year contract with a buy-out clause of €30 million. In addition, if the Lisbon club sold the player for a fee higher than €3.75M, Barcelona would receive 20% of the added value/differential value; the Catalans also retained an exclusive buy-back option for €8 million and €12 million, in 2012 and 2013 respectively.

Jeffrén played his first competitive match with Sporting on 13 August 2011, in a 1–1 home draw against S.C. Olhanense. He spent the vast majority of the first half of his first season sidelined with physical problems.

Jeffrén returned to action on 11 March 2012, and only needed 12 minutes on the pitch to score two goals in a 5–0 home victory over Vitória de Guimarães. He contributed only 13 league games in his second year, and was deemed surplus to requirements subsequently.

=== Valladolid ===
On 1 February 2014, Jeffrén returned to the Spanish top flight when he joined Real Valladolid on a two-and-a-half-year deal. He made his debut on 9 February at home against Elche CF, coming on at half time for Víctor Pérez: he crossed the ball for Humberto Osorio's 2–2 equaliser, but only a minute later left the pitch with a muscular injury after his team had already used all three substitutes.

Jeffrén scored his first goal for Valladolid on 2 November 2014, coming off the bench to score an 81st-minute winner in a 2–1 win against Girona FC at the Estadio Nuevo José Zorrilla that put his team on top of the second division table. He finished the campaign with three goals from 35 appearances, the other two coming in each fixture against former side Barcelona B – the first being a 7–0 thrashing on 21 December.

On 29 August 2015, Jeffrén terminated his contract with the Castile and León club.

=== Eupen ===
On the same day as leaving Valladolid, Jeffrén signed a three-year deal at K.A.S. Eupen from the Belgian Second Division. He made his debut on 13 September, replacing Guy Dufour in the 57th minute of a 1–4 home loss to K. Lierse SK. He scored his first goal for his new team thirteen days later, an added-time strike to seal a 3–1 win over R. White Star Bruxelles at the Kehrwegstadion.

On 3 October 2015, Jeffrén netted twice in a 5–1 rout at K.S.K. Heist. He finished the season with three goals in 17 matches, as the side came third and were promoted to the Belgian First Division A for administrative reasons.

=== Later career ===
Jeffren signed for Grasshopper Club Zürich of the Swiss Super League on a two-year deal on 9 July 2017. He left in late January 2019 for AEK Larnaca FC in the Cypriot First Division and, one year later, switched to the Croatian First Football League with NK Slaven Belupo.

After a brief spell with Al Dhaid SC in the United Arab Emirates, Jeffrén signed with Lamphun Warriors F.C. of the Thai League 2 in June 2021.

== International career ==
=== Spain ===
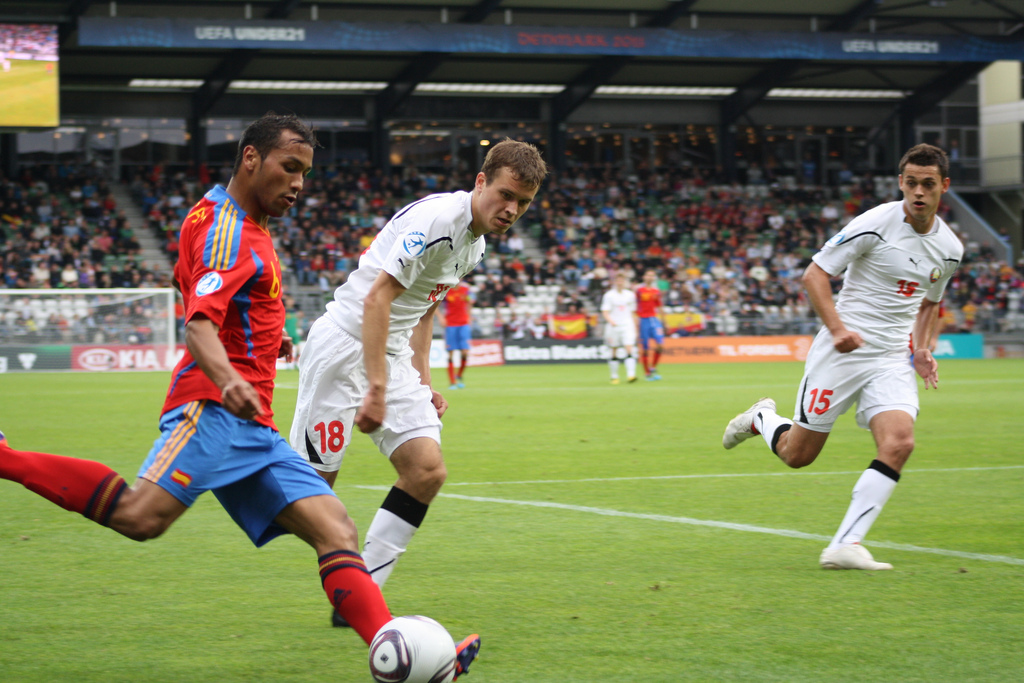
Jeffrén playing for Spain under-21s in 2011.

Jeffrén was part of the Spain under-19 squad that won the 2006 UEFA European Championship, playing eight matches and scoring three goals. Shortly after, he was called by Venezuela national team coach Richard Páez for the 2007 Copa América, but eventually did not switch allegiance due to injury.

On 6 February 2009, Jeffrén received his first under-21 callup. In 2011 he was selected by manager Luis Milla for the European Championships in Denmark, appearing in three games and scoring in the semi-final against Belarus (3–1 win) as the national team won their third trophy in the category.

=== Venezuela ===
Following his Spanish international youth spell, Jeffrén showed openness to represent Venezuela at senior level, an option he himself had discarded in 2010 when he was consulted by a journalist of his native country. On 19 March 2015, however, he acquired the necessary paperwork, being called up for the first time on 18 August and winning his first cap on 8 September by playing 31 minutes in a 1–1 friendly with Panama.

== Career statistics ==
As of match played on 12 May 2023

Appearances and goals by club, season and competition
| Club | Season | League | | | Cup | | Continental | | Other | | Total | |
| Club | Season | Division | Apps | Goals | Apps | Goals | Apps | Goals | Apps | Goals | Apps | Goals |
|---|---|---|---|---|---|---|---|---|---|---|---|---|
| Barcelona C | 2005–06 | Tercera División | 5 | 0 | – | | – | | – | | 5 | 0 |
| Barcelona C | 2006–07 | Tercera División | 2 | 1 | – | | – | | – | | 2 | 1 |
| Barcelona C | Total | | 7 | 1 | 0 | 0 | 0 | 0 | 0 | 0 | 7 | 1 |
| Barcelona B | 2006–07 | Segunda División B | 32 | 3 | – | | – | | – | | 32 | 3 |
| Barcelona B | 2007–08 | Tercera División | 30 | 6 | – | | – | | – | | 30 | 6 |
| Barcelona B | 2008–09 | Segunda División B | 20 | 5 | – | | – | | – | | 20 | 5 |
| Barcelona B | Total | | 82 | 14 | 0 | 0 | 0 | 0 | 0 | 0 | 82 | 14 |
| Barcelona | 2006–07 | La Liga | 0 | 0 | 1 | 0 | 0 | 0 | – | | 1 | 0 |
| Barcelona | 2007–08 | La Liga | 0 | 0 | 0 | 0 | 0 | 0 | – | | 0 | 0 |
| Barcelona | 2008–09 | La Liga | 2 | 0 | 0 | 0 | 0 | 0 | – | | 2 | 0 |
| Barcelona | 2009–10 | La Liga | 12 | 2 | 2 | 0 | 2 | 0 | 2 | 0 | 18 | 2 |
| Barcelona | 2010–11 | La Liga | 8 | 1 | 3 | 0 | 2 | 0 | 0 | 0 | 13 | 1 |
| Barcelona | Total | | 22 | 3 | 6 | 0 | 4 | 0 | 2 | 0 | 34 | 3 |
| Sporting CP | 2011–12 | Primeira Liga | 11 | 3 | 1 | 0 | 1 | 0 | 1 | 0 | 14 | 3 |
| Sporting CP | 2012–13 | Primeira Liga | 13 | 2 | 1 | 0 | 3 | 0 | 4 | 0 | 21 | 2 |
| Sporting CP | Total | | 24 | 5 | 2 | 0 | 4 | 0 | 5 | 0 | 35 | 5 |
| Valladolid | 2013–14 | La Liga | 11 | 0 | 0 | 0 | – | | – | | 11 | 0 |
| Valladolid | 2014–15 | Segunda División | 35 | 3 | 1 | 0 | – | | – | | 36 | 3 |
| Valladolid | Total | | 46 | 3 | 1 | 0 | 0 | 0 | 0 | 0 | 47 | 3 |
| Eupen | 2015–16 | Belgian Second Division | 17 | 3 | 1 | 0 | 0 | 0 | 0 | 0 | 18 | 3 |
| Eupen | 2016–17 | Belgian First Division A | 19 | 0 | 5 | 0 | 0 | 0 | 7 | 2 | 31 | 2 |
| Eupen | Total | | 36 | 3 | 6 | 0 | 0 | 0 | 7 | 2 | 49 | 5 |
| Grasshoppers | 2017–18 | Swiss Super League | 32 | 5 | 3 | 1 | 0 | 0 | – | | 35 | 6 |
| Grasshoppers | 2018–19 | Swiss Super League | 10 | 0 | 1 | 0 | 0 | 0 | – | | 11 | 0 |
| Grasshoppers | Total | | 42 | 5 | 4 | 1 | 0 | 0 | 0 | 0 | 46 | 6 |
| AEK Larnaca | 2018–19 | Cypriot First Division | 14 | 0 | 2 | 0 | 0 | 0 | – | | 16 | 0 |
| Slaven Belupo | 2019–20 | Croatian First Football League | 11 | 1 | 1 | 0 | 0 | 0 | – | | 12 | 1 |
| Slaven Belupo | 2020–21 | Croatian First Football League | 8 | 0 | 1 | 0 | 0 | 0 | – | | 9 | 0 |
| Slaven Belupo | Total | | 19 | 1 | 2 | 0 | 0 | 0 | 0 | 0 | 21 | 1 |
| Al Dhaid | 2020–21 | UAE Second Division League | 4 | 5 | 0 | 0 | – | | – | | 4 | 5 |
| Lamphun Warriors | 2021–22 | Thai League 2 | 27 | 12 | 1 | 0 | 0 | 0 | – | | 28 | 12 |
| Lamphun Warriors | 2022–23 | Thai League 1 | 17 | 2 | 1 | 0 | 0 | 0 | – | | 18 | 2 |
| Lamphun Warriors | Total | | 44 | 14 | 2 | 0 | 0 | 0 | 0 | 0 | 46 | 14 |
| Career total | | | 340 | 54 | 25 | 1 | 8 | 0 | 14 | 2 | 387 | 57 |

== Honours ==
Barcelona B

- Tercera División: 2007–08

Barcelona

- La Liga: 2008–09, 2009–10, 2010–11
- Supercopa de España: 2009, 2010
- UEFA Champions League: 2010–11
- FIFA Club World Cup: 2009
- Copa del Rey runner-up: 2010–11

Sporting CP

- Taça de Portugal runner-up: 2011–12

Lamphun Warrior

- Thai League 2: 2021–22

Spain U21

- UEFA European Under-21 Championship: 2011

Spain U19

- UEFA European Under-19 Championship: 2006
