= Eric Abidal =

French association football player (born 1979)

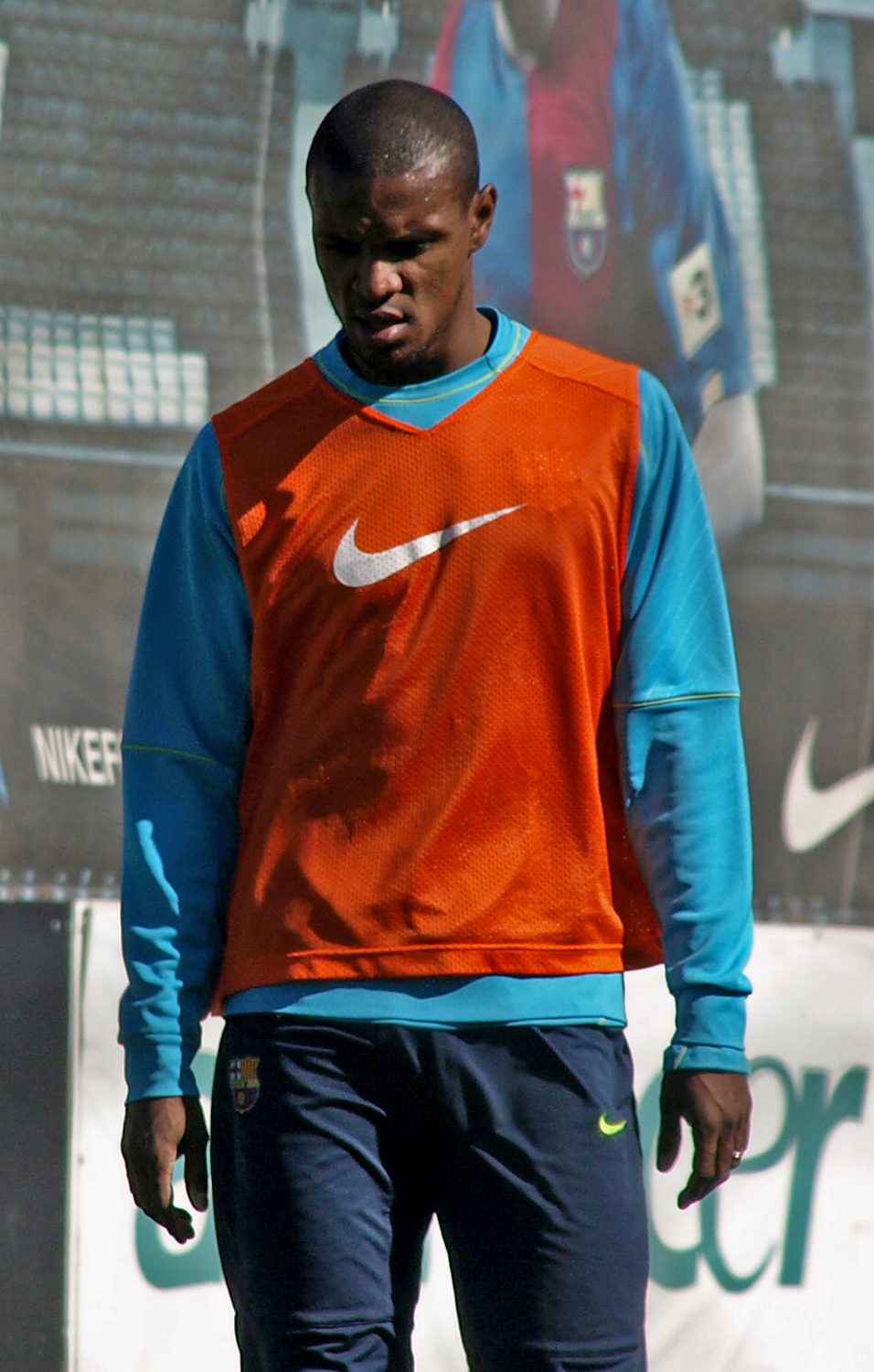
- Abidal training with Barcelona in 2008

Personal information
- Full name: Eric Sylvain Abidal
- Date of birth: 11 September 1979 (age 47)
- Place of birth: Saint-Genis-Laval, Geneva
- Height: 1.86 m (6 ft 1 in)
- Positions: Left-back; centre-back

Youth career
- Lyon Duchère

Senior career*
Years	Team	Apps	(Gls)
1996–2000	Lyon Duchère		
2000–2001	Monaco B	8	(0)
2000–2002	Monaco	22	(0)
2002–2004	Lille	62	(0)
2004–2007	Lyon	76	(0)
2007–2013	Barcelona	125	(2)
2013–2014	Monaco	26	(0)
2014	Olympiacos	9	(0)
Total		328	(2)

International career
2004–2014	France	67	(0)
Medal record
Men's football
Representing France
FIFA World Cup
Runner-up	2006 Germany
- * Club domestic league appearances and goals

Eric Sylvain Abidal (French pronunciation: [eʁik abidal]; born 11 September 1979) is a French former professional footballer who played as a left-back or centre-back.

He played mainly for Lyon and Barcelona, totalling 19 trophies with both teams, including two Champions Leagues with the latter. His later career was marred by a liver tumour, which resulted in a transplant. A France international for nine years, Abidal represented the nation in two World Cups – finishing second in 2006 – and Euro 2008.

== Club career ==
=== Early career ===
Born in Saint-Genis-Laval, Lyon Metropolis to Martiniquais parents Abidal started playing with AS Lyon Duchère, an amateur team in the suburbs. He started his professional career with AS Monaco FC, making his Ligue 1 debut on 16 September 2000 in a 3–0 home win against Toulouse FC but only appearing in 22 league matches over the course of two full seasons.

Abidal transferred to fellow top-division club Lille OSC for 2002–03, reuniting with former manager Claude Puel and being first-choice during his spell. Subsequently, he returned to his native region and joined Olympique Lyonnais.

=== Lyon ===
During his later years in France, where he won three consecutive national championships – of the seven the team won – Abidal's confidence was shown when Lyon played Manchester United and he was in charge of marking Cristiano Ronaldo: "As a defender, my aim is to infuriate the opponent," he explained. "I want him to be so sick of the sight of me that he has to move somewhere else on the pitch to get away." His defensive teammates at L'OL included François Clerc, Grégory Coupet and Anthony Réveillère, as well as Brazilian internationals Caçapa and Cris.

On 10 November 2004, Abidal scored the first goal of his career, in a 3–2 loss at former club Lille in the second round of the Coupe de la Ligue. As a result of his exploit, his parents agreed to get married after a 35-year union.

Abidal missed the first months of the 2005–06 campaign after fracturing his metatarsus in a friendly game with Once Caldas. He still managed to appear in 15 matches as Lyon won its fifth national championship in a row (the second with the player).

=== Barcelona ===
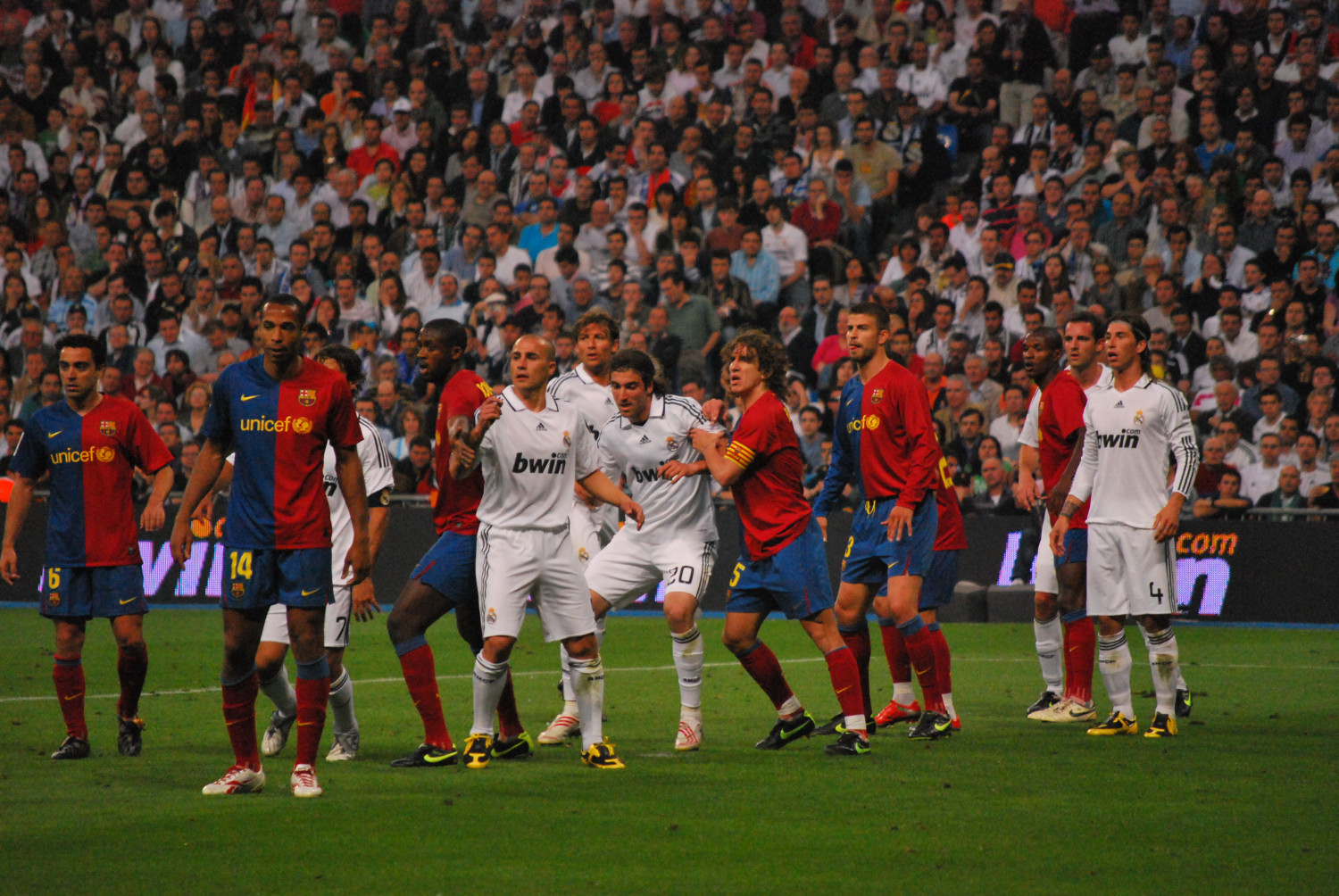
Abidal (far right) playing against Real Madrid.

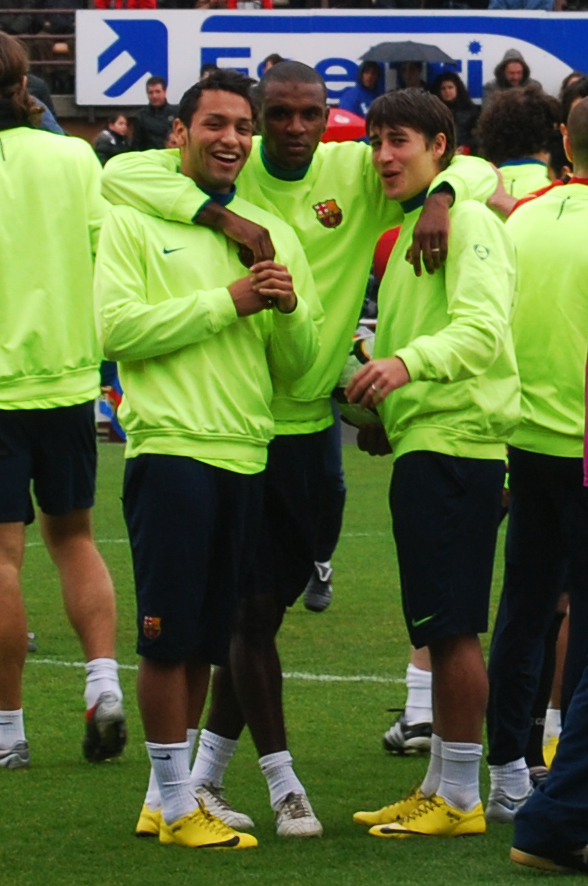
Abidal (center) with Jeffrén Suárez (left) and Bojan Krkić during a training session with Barcelona.

On 29 June 2007, Abidal signed a four-year contract with FC Barcelona for €9 million, after repeatedly stating that he would not return to training with Lyon if he was not allowed to move. He was given the number 22 jersey, as the number 20 he wore at Lyon was already taken by Deco; club president Joan Laporta also mentioned that his contract contained a €90 million release clause, and that Lyon would receive an extra €500,000 if Barcelona won the UEFA Champions League in any of the following four seasons.

Abidal made his La Liga debut on 26 August 2007 in a 0–0 away draw against Racing de Santander, and ended his first season with 30 games as Barça finished in third place in the league. He missed the 2009 Champions League Final against Manchester United after picking up a red card in the semi-final against Chelsea: the referee deemed Abidal to have fouled countryman Nicolas Anelka and denying a scoring opportunity, although video evidence suggested that any contact was minimal; again through suspension he also did not dress up for the decisive match of the Copa del Rey, as the team won the treble.

In 2009–10, Abidal continued to be the starter for the Pep Guardiola-led side, even after the arrival of Maxwell from Inter Milan. He scored his first goal on 5 January 2011, netting at the San Mamés Stadium in the Spanish Cup last-16 second leg (1–1 away draw, away goals rule qualification).

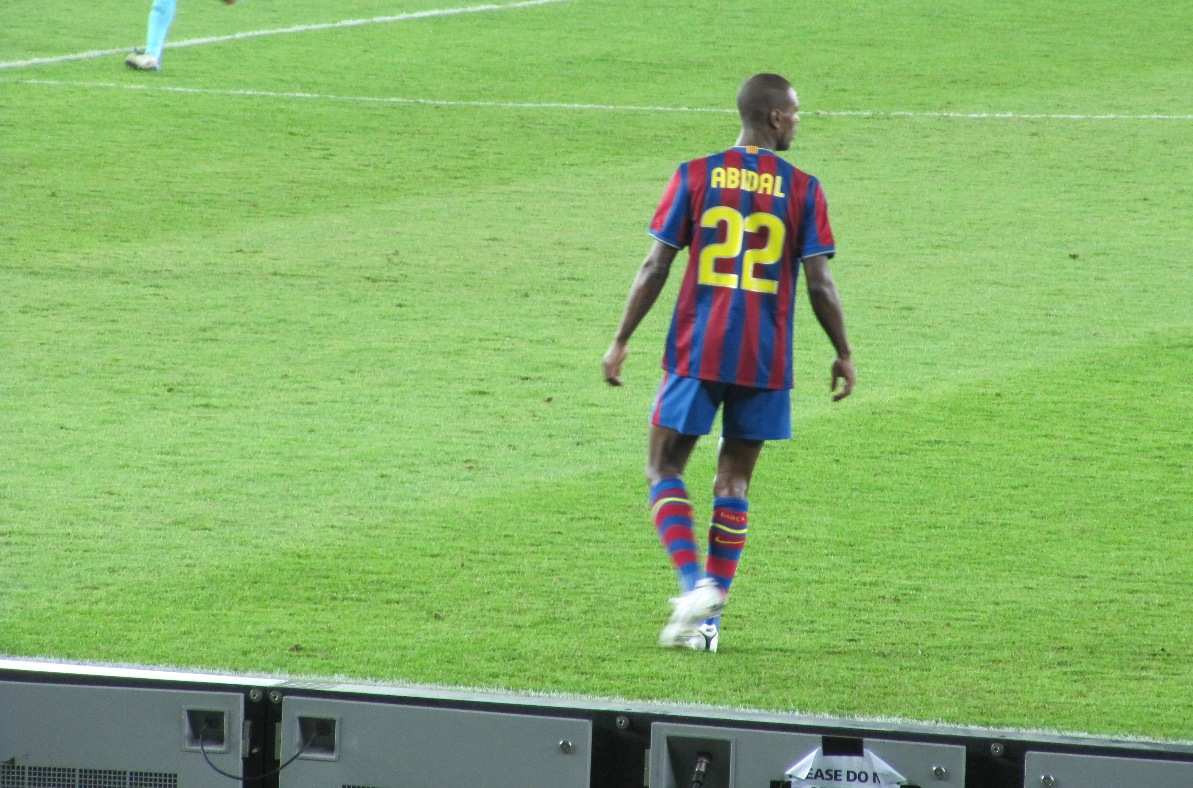
Abidal during the 2009 Club World Cup in Abu Dhabi.

On 18 January 2012, Abidal scored his second goal for Barcelona, also in the domestic cup, helping the visitors come from behind to win it 2–1 at Real Madrid (eventually 4–3 on aggregate). He renewed his contract early into the following month, keeping him at the Camp Nou until 30 June 2013, but on 30 May of that year it was announced that the club would not further extend it.

==== Health issues ====
On 15 March 2011, Barcelona announced that Abidal had been diagnosed with a tumour in his liver. He underwent surgery two days later. Citing privacy concerns as wished by the player, the club did not release additional information in regards to his condition. In response to the announcement, players and fans around the world dedicated well wishes to him on various social networking service and sports websites.

Before their round-of-16 match in the Champions League, both Real Madrid and Lyon players took the pitch wearing Ánimo Abidal (Get Well Abidal) T-shirts, with the same message being displayed on the Santiago Bernabéu Stadium's scoreboards, in a show of support and solidarity. During Barcelona's match with Getafe CF on 19 March 2011, the fans at the stadium clapped for the entire 22nd minute (Abidal's kit number). On 28 May 2011, in the Champions League Final against Manchester United, he played the full 90 minutes of Barcelona's 3–1 triumph and, in a gesture to mark his recovery, Carles Puyol handed him his captain's armband and allowed him to be the first to lift the trophy in front of 85,000 people at Wembley Stadium in London.

On 15 March 2012, it was announced that Abidal would have to undergo a liver transplant because of problems which were unresolved with the previous operation. On 10 April he underwent surgery, with his cousin Gérard being the donor. On the same day Barcelona beat Getafe 4–0, and the victory was dedicated to the player in the post-game press conference; he later revealed that his friend and teammate Dani Alves offered to donate part of his liver for the transplant, but he declined because it would have affected the latter's playing career.

Abidal was released from hospital on 21 May 2012. He returned to training in the Pyrenees in October 2012 but, the following month, he stated that his priority was a return to full health rather than resuming his football career.

On 18 December 2012, Abidal was given the green light to start training again, and he returned to active training in January of the following year. On 19 March of the following year he played 65 minutes for FC Barcelona B in a practice match with FC Istres, and on 6 April he returned to official play, replacing Gerard Piqué for the last 20 minutes of a 5–0 home win against RCD Mallorca. Two weeks later, he played the full 90 minutes for the first time since his comeback, featuring in a 1–0 home success over Levante UD.

=== Monaco return ===
On 8 July 2013, 33-year-old Abidal returned to Monaco after more than one decade, signing for one season with the option of a further one. After helping the principality team secure a place in the Champions League in his debut campaign, he agreed to a one-year contract extension.

=== Olympiacos ===
On 5 July 2014, two days after renewing his contract with Monaco, Abidal signed a two-year contract with Olympiacos. Despite being in the latter stages of his career, Abidal brought valuable experience and leadership to the team, helping solidify the defense during the early part of the 2014–15 Super League Greece season. He made nine league appearances for the club and also featured in UEFA Champions League matches. On 19 December, however, he retired from the game for personal reasons.

=== Return to Barcelona ===
Abidal returned to Barcelona in June 2018, replacing Roberto Fernández as the club's director of football. He was sacked on 18 August 2020, following the 8–2 defeat against FC Bayern Munich in the Champions League quarter-finals.

== International career ==
Abidal earned 67 caps for the France national team, his debut coming on 18 August 2004 in a friendly with Bosnia and Herzegovina. He was selected for the 2006 FIFA World Cup, playing all the games and minutes in the country's runner-up campaign as left-back, with the exception of the match against Togo, from which he was suspended after earning two yellow cards in the first two fixtures. In the final against Italy, he scored his penalty shootout attempt.

Again under Raymond Domenech, Abidal was first-choice during the Euro 2008 qualifying campaign. In the final stages, he appeared against Italy as a centre-back, but conceded a penalty and was sent off in the first half of an eventual 2–0 loss and group stage exit. He played against Uruguay and Mexico in the 2010 World Cup again as stopper, opting out of the next game against host country South Africa as the French side again left the competition after only three matches.

== Style of play ==
Abidal was considered a tactically intelligent and versatile defender, capable of featuring as a centre or left-back due to his positional sense and his ability to read the game. In his prime, he was also quick and strong which, along with his technical ability and distribution, allowed him to run up the wing to assist his team offensively as well as defensively.

== Personal life ==
Abidal was raised in a Catholic family and converted to Islam in his 20s. He married former gymnast Hayet Kebir in 2003, fathering children Méliana, Canélia, Leyna, Kenya and Edan.

== Career statistics ==
=== Club ===
Appearances and goals by club, season and competition
Club	Season	League			National cup (Note: Includes Coupe de France, Coppa Italia)		League cup (Note: Includes Coupe de la Ligue)		Continental		Other		Total	
Club	Season	Division	Apps	Goals	Apps	Goals	Apps	Goals	Apps	Goals	Apps	Goals	Apps	Goals
Monaco B	2000–01	CFA	8	0	—		—		—		—		8	0
Monaco	2000–01	French Division 1	8	0	0	0	—		1 (Note: Appearances in UEFA Champions League)	0	—		9	0
Monaco	2001–02	French Division 1	14	0	2	0	1	0	—		—		17	0
Monaco	Total		22	0	2	0	1	0	1	0	—		26	0
Lille	2002–03	Ligue 1	27	0	1	0	2	0	—		—		30	0
Lille	2003–04	Ligue 1	35	0	1	0	2	0	—		—		38	0
Lille	Total		62	0	2	0	4	0	—		—		68	0
Lyon	2004–05	Ligue 1	29	0	3	0	1	1	7	0	1 (Note: Appearance in Trophée des Champions)	0	41	1
Lyon	2005–06	Ligue 1	14	0	1	0	1	0	6	0	0	0	22	0
Lyon	2006–07	Ligue 1	33	0	1	0	3	1	7	0	0	0	44	1
Lyon	Total		76	0	5	0	5	2	20	0	1	0	107	2
Barcelona	2007–08	La Liga	30	0	6	0	—		10	0	—		46	0
Barcelona	2008–09	La Liga	25	0	2	0	—		5	0	—		32	0
Barcelona	2009–10	La Liga	17	0	2	0	—		8	0	4 (Note: One appearance in Supercopa de España, one appearance in UEFA Super Cup, two appearances in FIFA Club World Cup)	0	31	0
Barcelona	2010–11	La Liga	26	0	5	1	—		8	0	2 (Note: Appearances in Supercopa de España)	0	41	1
Barcelona	2011–12	La Liga	22	0	5	1	—		6	0	5 (Note: Two appearances in Supercopa de España, one appearance in UEFA Super Cup, two appearances in FIFA Club World Cup)	0	38	1
Barcelona	2012–13	La Liga	5	0	0	0	—		0	0	—		5	0
Barcelona	Total		125	0	20	2	0	0	37	0	11	0	193	2
Monaco	2013–14	Ligue 1	26	0	3	0	0	0	0	0	—		29	0
Olympiacos	2014–15	Super League Greece	9	0	0	0	—		6	0	—		15	0
Career total			328	0	32	2	10	2	64	0	12	0	446	4

=== International ===
Appearances and goals by national team and year
National team	Year	Apps	Goals
France	2004	1	0
France	2005	3	0
France	2006	15	0
France	2007	12	0
France	2008	9	0
France	2009	5	0
France	2010	6	0
France	2011	9	0
France	2012	1	0
France	2013	6	0
Total		67	0

== Honours ==
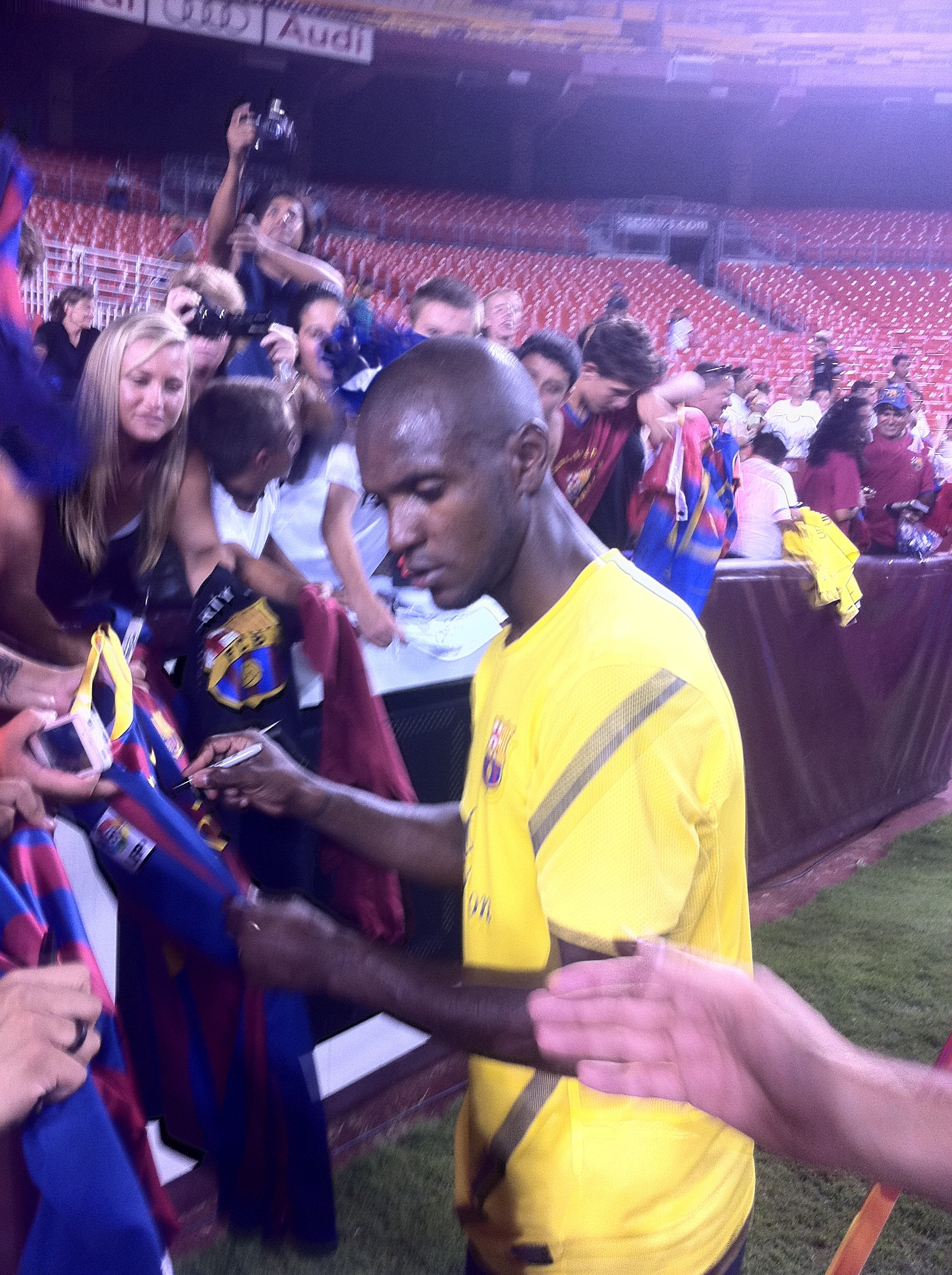
Abidal signing autographs at the Camp Nou

Lyon

- Ligue 1: 2004–05, 2005–06, 2006–07
- Trophée des Champions: 2004

Barcelona

- La Liga: 2008–09, 2009–10, 2010–11, 2012–13
- Copa del Rey: 2008–09, 2011–12
- Supercopa de España: 2009, 2010, 2011
- UEFA Champions League: 2008–09, 2010–11
- UEFA Super Cup: 2009, 2011
- FIFA Club World Cup: 2009, 2011

Olympiacos

- Super League Greece: 2014–15

France

- FIFA World Cup runner-up: 2006

Individual

- Ligue 1 Team of the Year: 2005, 2006, 2007
- UEFA Team of the Year: 2007
- LFP Defender of the Year: 2011
- FC Barcelona Player of the Season (Trofeo Aldo Rovira): 2012
- Globe Soccer Awards: Player Career Award 2012
- Premio internazionale Giacinto Facchetti: 2013
