= Antzuola =

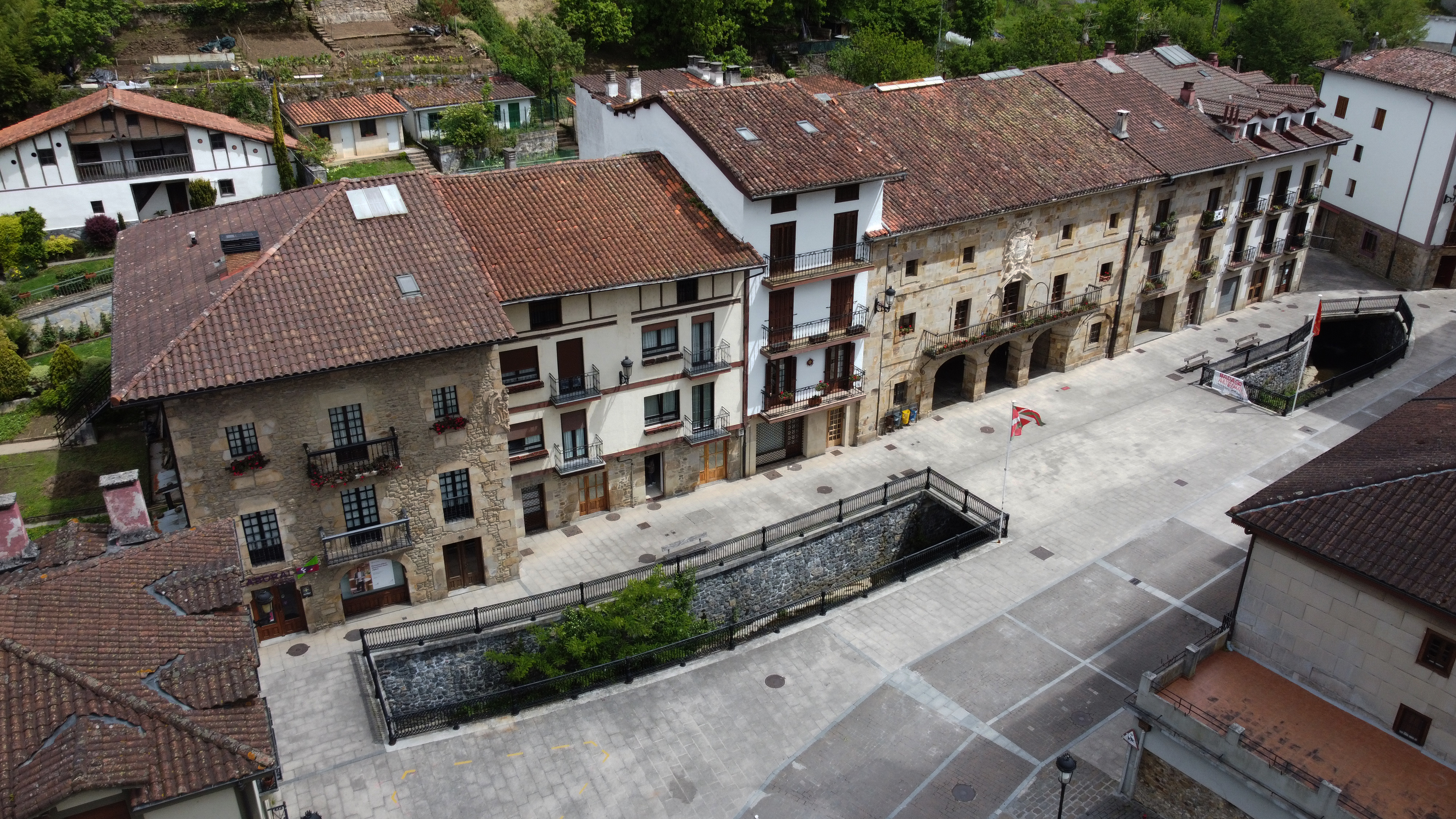
- Main square of the village

- Coat of arms

- Location of Antzuola within the Basque Country
- Coordinates: 43°5′57″N 2°22′50″W
- Country: Spain
- Autonomous community: Gipuzkoa

Government
  - Mayor: Olatz Lezeta Urzelai

Area
  - Total: 27.72 km^{2} (10.70 sq mi)

Population (2025-01-01)
  - Total: 2,045
  - Density: 73.77/km^{2} (191.1/sq mi)
- Time zone: UTC+1 (CET)
  - Summer (DST): UTC+2 (CEST)
- Website: www.antzuola.eus

Antzuola is a town located in the province of Gipuzkoa, in the autonomous community of Basque Country, in the North of Spain.
