= Super Coppa Sammarinese =

- Founded: 2012
- Region: San Marino
- Teams: 2
- Current champions: Tre Fiori (3rd title)
- Most championships: La Fiorita; Tre Penne; Tre Fiori; Virtus (3 titles each)

The Super Coppa Sammarinese (English: San Marino Super Cup) is an annual association football match in San Marino between the winners of the Campionato Sammarinese di Calcio and the Coppa Titano. The fixture is recognised as a super cup.

The competition was first contested in the 2012–13 season after the tournament replaced the Trofeo Federale as the super cup of San Marino.

== Matches ==
Season	Winners	Score	Runners-up	Venue
2012; Details	La Fiorita; Winner of 2011–12 Coppa Titano	1–0	Tre Penne; Winner of 2011–12 Campionato Sammarinese di Calcio	Campo di Fiorentino
2013; Details	Tre Penne; Winner of 2012–13 Campionato Sammarinese di Calcio	2–1	La Fiorita; Winner of 2012–13 Coppa Titano	Campo di Fiorentino
2014; Details	Libertas; Winner of 2013–14 Coppa Titano	3–3 (5–4 (p))	La Fiorita; Winner of 2013–14 Campionato Sammarinese di Calcio	Campo di Fiorentino
2015; Details	Folgore Falciano; Winner of 2014–15 Campionato Sammarinese di Calcio & 2014–15 Coppa Titano	2–0	Murata; Runners-up of 2014–15 Coppa Titano	Campo di Fiorentino
2016; Details	Tre Penne; Winner of 2015–16 Campionato Sammarinese di Calcio	2–1	La Fiorita; Winner of 2015–16 Coppa Titano	Campo di Fiorentino
2017; Details	Tre Penne; Winner of 2016–17 Coppa Titano	4–0	La Fiorita; Winner of 2016–17 Campionato Sammarinese di Calcio	Campo di Fiorentino
2018; Details	La Fiorita; Winner of 2017–18 Campionato Sammarinese di Calcio	1–0	Tre Penne; Runners-up of 2017–18 Coppa Titano	Campo di Fiorentino
2019; Details	Tre Fiori; Winner of 2018–19 Coppa Titano	2–1	Tre Penne; Winner of 2018–19 Campionato Sammarinese di Calcio	Campo di Acquaviva
2020	Not held			
2021; Details	La Fiorita; Winner of 2020–21 Coppa Titano	3–2	Folgore; Winner of 2020–21 Campionato Sammarinese di Calcio	Campo di Acquaviva
2022; Details	Tre Fiori; Winner of 2021–22 Coppa Titano	2–1 (a.e.t.)	La Fiorita; Winner of 2021–22 Campionato Sammarinese di Calcio	Campo di Acquaviva
2023; Details	Virtus; Winner of 2022–23 Coppa Titano	2–0	Tre Penne; Winner of 2022–23 Campionato Sammarinese di Calcio	San Marino Stadium
2024; Details	Virtus; Winner of 2023–24 Campionato Sammarinese di Calcio	1–0	La Fiorita; Winner of 2023–24 Coppa Titano	San Marino Stadium
2025; Details	Virtus; Winner of 2024–25 Campionato Sammarinese di Calcio & 2024–25 Coppa Titano	1–0	Tre Fiori; Runner-up of 2024–25 Coppa Titano	Campo di Acquaviva
2026; Details	Tre Fiori; Winner of 2025–26 Campionato Sammarinese di Calcio	2–2 (4–3 (p))	La Fiorita; Winner of 2025–26 Coppa Titano	Campo di Acquaviva

== Performance by club ==
Team	Winners	Runners-up	Winning years	Runners-up years
La Fiorita	3	7	2012, 2018, 2021	2013, 2014, 2016, 2017, 2022, 2024, 2026
Tre Penne	3	4	2013, 2016, 2017	2012, 2018, 2019, 2023
Tre Fiori	3	1	2019, 2022, 2026	2025
Virtus	3	—	2023, 2024, 2025	—
Folgore Falciano	1	1	2015	2021
Libertas	1	—	2014	—
Murata	—	1	—	2015
