= Nicola Chiaruzzi =

Sammarinese footballer

Personal information
- Date of birth: December 25, 1987 (age 38)
- Place of birth: Borgo Maggiore
- Height: 1.87 m (6 ft 2 in)
- Position: Defensive midfielder

Senior career*
Years	Team	Apps	(Gls)
2006–2007	FC Fiorentino		
2007–2009	La Fiorita	28	(2)
2009–2021	Tre Penne	144	(8)

International career^{‡}
2010–2016	San Marino	9	(0)
- * Club domestic league appearances and goals as of 25 June 2022 ‡ National team caps and goals as of 18 July 2020

Nicola Chiaruzzi (born 25 December 1987) is a Sammarinese footballer who last played for Tre Penne.

He has been capped by the San Marino national football team making his international debut in 2010.

== Honours ==
SP Tre Penne

- Campionato Sammarinese: 2011–12, 2012–13, 2015–16, 2018–19
- Coppa Titano: 2016–17
- San Marino Super Cup: 2013, 2016

Individual

- Pallone di Cristallo: 2008
