= 2007–08 Campionato Sammarinese di Calcio =

Campionato Sammarinese di Calcio
- Season: 2007–08

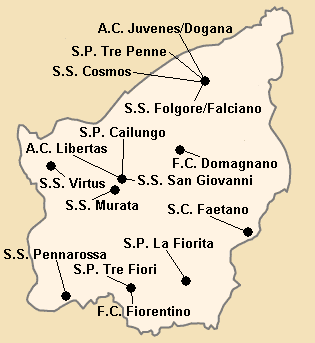
2007–08 Campionato Sammarinese di Calcio team distribution

The 2007–08 Campionato Sammarinese di Calcio season was the twenty-third since its establishment. The regular season started on September 21, 2007, and ended on April 20, 2008. The playoff competition, in which the top three clubs from each girone competed for the national title and qualification for the first qualifying round of the UEFA Champions League next season, started on May 7, 2008, and ended with the final on June 3, 2008. S.S. Murata successfully defended their title for the second time, winning their third straight national title, and winning qualification, beating out Juvenes/Dogana in the final.

== 2007–08 teams ==
=== Girone A (8 teams) ===
- S.P. Cailungo (Borgo Maggiore)
- F.C. Domagnano (Domagnano)
- S.S. Folgore/Falciano (Serravalle)
- F.C. Fiorentino (Fiorentino)
- A.C. Juvenes/Dogana (Serravalle)
- S.S. Pennarossa (Chiesanuova)
- S.P. Tre Fiori (Fiorentino)
- S.P. Tre Penne (Serravalle)

=== Girone B (7 teams) ===
- S.S. Cosmos (Serravalle)
- S.C. Faetano (Faetano)
- S.P. La Fiorita (Montegiardino)
- A.C. Libertas (Borgo Maggiore)
- S.S. Murata (San Marino)
- S.S. San Giovanni (Borgo Maggiore)
- S.S. Virtus (Acquaviva)

== Regular season ==
=== Group A ===
Pos	Team	Pld	W	D	L	GF	GA	GD	Pts	Qualification
1	Tre Penne	21	13	5	3	51	22	+29	44	Qualification for the championship play–offs
2	Tre Fiori	21	10	6	5	35	26	+9	36	Qualification for the championship play–offs
3	Juvenes/Dogana	21	10	6	5	31	18	+13	36	Qualification for the championship play–offs (Note: Juvenes/Dogana qualifies for the UEFA Cup as runners-up of the Coppa Titano due to the Coppa winners, Murata, qualifying for the Champions League as a result of winning the play-offs.)
4	Cailungo	21	10	6	5	37	24	+13	36	
5	Pennarossa	21	7	4	10	33	42	−9	25	
6	Folgore/Falciano	21	6	4	11	21	37	−16	22	
7	Domagnano	21	4	5	12	36	54	−18	17	
8	Fiorentino	21	1	1	19	17	60	−43	4	

=== Group B ===
Pos	Team	Pld	W	D	L	GF	GA	GD	Pts	Qualification
1	Murata	20	12	7	1	46	15	+31	43	Qualification for the championship play–offs
2	La Fiorita	20	12	6	2	39	24	+15	42	Qualification for the championship play–offs
3	Faetano	20	11	4	5	45	18	+27	37	Qualification for the championship play–offs
4	Virtus	20	9	7	4	34	23	+11	34	
5	Cosmos	20	6	5	9	21	33	−12	23	
6	Libertas	20	5	6	9	27	36	−9	21	
7	San Giovanni	17	1	2	14	15	56	−41	5	

=== Results ===
All teams play twice against the teams within their own group and once against the teams from the other group.

Home \ Away	CAI	COS	DOM	FAE	FIO	FOL	J/D	LFI	LIB	MUR	PEN	SGI	TFI	TPE	VIR
Virtus			0–0		3–0	2–0	1–1		2–1	1–1	0–3		2–1	2–1	2–1
Juvenes/Dogana	2–2		1–1	0–6	2–1		1–1	1–4	1–0	0–2		1–0			0–3
Cailungo	1–1				3–3	4–1	0–2	1–2			4–4	4–3	1–4	1–5	2–3
Folgore	1–0	1–0	3–0		3–0			0–2	4–1	1–1		4–0		1–1	1–2
Libertas	1–3		0–7			2–3	0–2	1–3	1–2		0–1	1–0	0–3	2–6	
Cosmos	0–4	0–0	4–0	1–2	2–0		1–1			0–5	0–0	1–0	2–1	1–2	
Pennarossa	1–0		3–1	0–2	2–1	0–0				1–2	3–1	4–0	0–1	0–0	
Murata	5–2	4–4		2–0		2–0	2–0		1–1	0–0		1–0		1–3	1–0
San Giovanni		0–3	1–4	1–4		4–1	0–4	1–1		1–0		4–0	0–1		2–2
Domagnano		1–0	8–1	1–0	3–1			5–1	3–1		4–1	2–1	0–0		1–1
Tre Penne	1–6	3–0	1–0	1–1	3–1	1–3	0–1	1–2	0–3				1–1	0–3	
Fiorentino	0–2	0–1		1–8				0–1	2–2	2–5	2–4		1–1	1–7	0–3
La Fiorita	2–1	0–3	2–1	3–3	5–1	2–1	2–1	2–2			3–2			0–1	0–0
Tre Fiori	1–1	2–0	3–0		3–1	2–0	1–2		0–0	1–1	4–3		3–1		2–4
Faetano		2–1		1–0	1–0	3–0	2–2	2–2	2–2	1–1	1–2	0–2			

Legend: Blue = home team win; Yellow = draw; Red = away team win.

== Play-off ==
=== First round ===
The second place club will play the third place club from the opposite girone.

Team 1	Score	Team 2
La Fiorita	3–4	Juvenes/Dogana
Tre Fiori	1–0	Faetano

=== Second round ===
The first round winners play the first place clubs from each girone.

Team 1	Score	Team 2
Tre Penne	1–5	Juvenes/Dogana
Murata	2–2 (a.e.t.) (6–3 p)	Tre Fiori

=== Third round ===
The losers from the first and second round play each other. The losers from this round are eliminated.

Team 1	Score	Team 2
Tre Penne	1–2	Faetano
Tre Fiori	1–0	La Fiorita

=== Fourth round ===
The second round winners play each other. The winner advances to the finals and loser moves to the semifinals.

Team 1	Score	Team 2
Juvenes/Dogana	0–2	Murata

The third round winners play each other and the loser is eliminated.

Team 1	Score	Team 2
Faetano	2–1	Tre Fiori

=== Semifinal ===
The winner advances to the finals and the loser is eliminated.

Team 1	Score	Team 2
Faetano	0–1 (a.e.t.)	Juvenes/Dogana

=== Final ===
3 June 2008

Murata	1–0	Juvenes/Dogana
C. Valentini 83'	Report

Stadio Olimpico, Serravalle

== Top goalscorers ==
Updated to games played April 20, 2008.

=== Girone A ===
16 goals

- (San Marino) Marco Fantini (Juvenes/Dogana)

14 goals

- (San Marino) Stefano Bullini (Tre Penne)

13 goals

- (San Marino) Alessandro Giunta (Tre Fiori)

11 goals

- (San Marino) Marco Casadei (Tre Penne)
- (San Marino) Alberto Celli (Domagnano)

10 goals

- (San Marino) Simone Amadori (Tre Penne)
- (San Marino) Alessandro Pancotti (Pennarossa)

9 goals

- (San Marino) Francesco Rossi (Cailungo)

8 goals

- (San Marino) Fabio Felici (Domagnano)
- (San Marino) Steven Venerucci (Fiorentino)
- (San Marino) Giacomo Gamberini (Juvenes/Dogana)
- (San Marino) Lorenzo Boschi (Cailungo)

=== Girone B ===
21 goals

- (Morocco) Mohammed Zaboul (Murata)

17 goals

- (San Marino) Alex Olivieri (Faetano)

16 goals

- (Italy) Simon Parma (La Fiorita)

12 goals

- (San Marino) Fabio Algeri (Libertas)

10 goals

- (San Marino) Filippi Fabbri (Virtus)

9 goals

- (San Marino) Domenico Di Paolo (San Giovanni)

8 goals

- (San Marino) Andrea Bartoli (Virtus)
- (San Marino) Ridvan Frani (Virtus)
- (San Marino) Roberto Gatti (La Fiorita)
- (San Marino) Paolo Montagna (Cosmos)

7 goals

- (San Marino) Octavio Folli (Faetano)
- (San Marino) Maurizio Di Giulu (Murata)
