= 2017 Super Coppa Sammarinese =

Tre Penne	La Fiorita
4	0
- Date: 20 September 2017
- Venue: Campo di Fiorentino, Fiorentino, San Marino
- Referee: Antonio Ucini

The 2017 Super Coppa Sammarinese was played on 20 September 2017, at Campo di Fiorentino in Fiorentino, San Marino. This was the 6th Super Coppa Sammarinese and was played by Tre Penne, winners of the 2016–17 Coppa Titano, and La Fiorita, winners of the 2016–17 Campionato Sammarinese di Calcio. Tre Penne won 4–0 to win their third Super Coppa Sammarinese.

== Route to the final ==
Tre Penne qualified by winning the 2016–17 Coppa Titano and La Fiorita qualified by winning the 2016–17 Campionato Sammarinese di Calcio.

== Match ==
20 September 2017
19:45 CEST

La Fiorita	0–4	Tre Penne
	Report	Patregnani 14'; Paganelli 56' 67'; Martini 87'

Campo di Fiorentino, Fiorentino
Attendance: 250
Referee: Antonio Ucini

GK	(Italy)	Gianluca Vivan
DF	(San Marino)	Matteo Colonna
DF	(Italy)	Andrea Martini
DF	(Italy)	Marco Gasperoni
MF	(Italy)	Simone Loiodice
MF	(Senegal)	Andy Djeng
MF	(Italy)	Armando Amati	(substituted off) 80'
MF	(San Marino)	Samuel Pancotti	(substituted off) 57'
FW	(Italy)	Adrian Ricchiuti
FW	(San Marino)	Alessandro Guidi
FW	(San Marino)	Adolfo Hirsch	(substituted off) 60'
Substitutes:
MF	(San Marino)	Tiziano Mottola	(substituted on) 57'
DF	(Italy)	Alberto Mazzola	(substituted on) 60'
MF	(San Marino)	Nicola Cavalli	(substituted on) 80'
FW	(San Marino)	Andy Selva
MF	(San Marino)	Franceso Beinat
DF	(Italy)	Samuele Olivi
GK	(Italy)	Alex Stimac
Manager:
(San Marino) Nicola Berardi

GK	(Italy)	Mattia Migani
DF	(San Marino)	Davide Cesarini
DF	(San Marino)	Andrea Rossi
DF	(Italy)	Dario Merendino
MF	(San Marino)	Alex Gasperoni
MF	(Italy)	Luca Patregnani	(substituted off) 74'
MF	(Italy)	Stefano Fraternali
FW	(Italy)	Marco Martini
MF	(San Marino)	Mirko Palazzi	(substituted off) 79'
FW	(Italy)	Riccardo Paganelli
FW	(Italy)	Michele Simoncelli	(substituted off) 69'
Substitutes:
MF	(Italy)	Riccardo Santini	(substituted on) 69'
DF	(San Marino)	Kevin Marigliano	(substituted on) 74'
MF	(San Marino)	Pietro Calzolari	(substituted on) 79'
DF	(Italy)	Davide Succi
GK	(San Marino)	Fabio Macaluso
DF	(San Marino)	Lorenzo Capicchioni
DF	(Italy)	Andrea Lazzarini
Manager:
(Italy) Luigi Bizzotto

Assistant referees:
Dario Sammaritani
Francesco Mineo
Fourth official:
Emiliano Albani

Match rules

- 90 minutes.
- 30 minutes of extra-time if necessary.
- Penalty shoot-out if scores still level.
- Maximum of seven named substitutes.
- Maximum of three substitutions.
