= 2012 Super Coppa Sammarinese =

Tre Penne	La Fiorita
0	1
- Date: 3 October 2012
- Venue: Campo di Fiorentino, Fiorentino
- Referee: Marco Avoni

The 2012 Super Coppa Sammarinese was the first Super Coppa Sammarinese football match. It was contested by Tre Penne, the winner of the 2011–12 Campionato Sammarinese di Calcio, and La Fiorita the winner of the 2011–12 Coppa Titano. The match was held on 3 October 2012 at the Campo di Fiorentino.

La Fiorita defeated Tre Penne 0-1, to win their first ever Super Coppa.

== Match details ==
3 October 2012
20:00

Tre Penne	0–1	La Fiorita
Mikhaylovskiy (yellow card); Tamburini (yellow card); Valli (yellow card)	Report	Parma (yellow card); Mottola 86' (pen.)

Campo di Fiorentino, Fiorentino, San Marino
