= Pallone di Cristallo =

- Description: Best player of the season in Sanmarinese football
- Country: San Marino
- Presented by: San Marino RTV (Calcio Estate)
- Website: www.sanmarinortv.sm

Television/radio coverage
- Directed by: Giorgio Betti

Pallone di Cristallo (Italian for Crystal Ball) is an annual award given to the player who is adjudged to have been the best of the season in Sanmarinese football.

The winner is chosen by a technical commission, directed by Italian journalist Giorgio Betti.

The award has been assigned since 1997/98 season and is usually presented during a SM TV summer special, Calcio Estate.

== Winners ==
The full list of past winners:

Year	Player	Nationality	Club
1998	Simone Bianchi	San Marino	Folgore Falciano
1999	Enea Zucchi	San Marino	Domagnano
2000	Evert Zavoli	San Marino	Virtus
2001	Alex Giaquinto	Italy	Tre Penne
2002	Nicola Bacciocchi	San Marino	Domagnano
2003	Giacomo Fambri	Italy	Domagnano
2004	Federico Gasperoni	San Marino	Urbino
2005	Marco Casadei	San Marino	Domagnano
2006	Damiano Vannucci	San Marino	Libertas
2007	Massimo Agostini	Italy	Murata
2008	Nicola Chiaruzzi	San Marino	La Fiorita
2009	Simone Montanari	Italy	Juvenes Dogana
2010	Mirko Palazzi	San Marino	Tre Penne
2011	Paolo Montagna	San Marino	Cosmos
2012	Enrico Cibelli	San Marino	Tre Penne
2013	Aldo Simoncini	San Marino	Libertas
2014	Francesco Perrotta	Italy	Folgore Falciano
2015	Adolfo Hirsch	San Marino	Folgore Falciano
2016	Nicola Gai	Italy	Tre Penne
2017	Danilo Rinaldi	San Marino	La Fiorita
2018	Nicolò Angelini	San Marino	Domagnano
2019	Luca Ceccaroli	San Marino	Tre Penne
2020	not assigned		
2021	Gianluca Vivan	Italy	La Fiorita
2022	Roberto Di Maio	San Marino	La Fiorita
2023	Luca Ceccaroli	San Marino	Tre Penne
2024	Alessandro Golinucci	San Marino	Virtus
2025	Samuel Pancotti	San Marino	Folgore Falciano
