= 2015–16 Coppa Titano =

Tournament details
- Country: San Marino
- Teams: 15

Final positions
- Champions: La Fiorita
- Runners-up: Pennarossa

The 2015–16 Coppa Titano were the 58th season in the cup's history. The tournament began on 15 September 2015 and ended on 1 May 2016.

La Fiorita won the tournament and qualified for the Europa League.

== Format ==
The format of the cup changed from previous years. The fifteen teams from San Marino were drawn into four groups. The winners and runners-up in each group advance to the knockout stage.

== Group stage ==
Each team played a total of six matches against the teams in their group. In groups A, B, and C teams played each other twice. In group D teams played each other three times. The top two from each group advance to the Knockout stage.

=== Group A ===
Pos	Team	Pld	W	D	L	GF	GA	GD	Pts	Qualification
1	Domagnano	6	3	1	2	8	9	−1	10	Knockout stage
2	Tre Penne	6	2	3	1	12	9	+3	9	Knockout stage
3	Murata	6	3	0	3	16	12	+4	9	
4	Faetano	6	1	2	3	3	9	−6	5	

Source: soccerway.com
Rules for classification: 1) Points; 2) Goal difference; 3) Goals scored; 4) Head-to-head points; 5) Head-to-head goal difference; 6) Head-to-head goals scored; 7) Draw.

Home \ Away	DOM	FAE	MUR	TPE
Domagnano		0–1	2–1	2–1
Faetano	0–1		1–5	0–0
Murata	4–1	2–0		1–4
Tre Penne	2–2	1–1	4–3	

Updated to match(es) played on 30 March 2016. Source:
Legend: Blue = home team win; Yellow = draw; Red = away team win.

=== Group B ===
Pos	Team	Pld	W	D	L	GF	GA	GD	Pts	Qualification
1	Libertas	6	3	1	2	5	5	0	10	Knockout stage
2	Pennarossa	6	2	3	1	7	4	+3	9	Knockout stage
3	Virtus	6	2	2	2	10	8	+2	8	
4	Cosmos	6	1	2	3	5	10	−5	5	

Source: soccerway.com
Rules for classification: 1) Points; 2) Goal difference; 3) Goals scored; 4) Head-to-head points; 5) Head-to-head goal difference; 6) Head-to-head goals scored; 7) Draw.

Home \ Away	COS	LIB	PEN	VIR
Cosmos		0–1	1–1	1–6
Libertas	0–2		0–1	1–0
Pennarossa	0–0	1–2		0–0
Virtus	2–1	1–1	1–4	

Updated to match(es) played on 30 March 2016. Source:
Legend: Blue = home team win; Yellow = draw; Red = away team win.

=== Group C ===
Pos	Team	Pld	W	D	L	GF	GA	GD	Pts	Qualification
1	La Fiorita	6	4	0	2	11	5	+6	12	Knockout stage
2	Fiorentino	6	3	1	2	9	4	+5	10	Knockout stage
3	Juvenes/Dogana	6	2	1	3	8	9	−1	7	
4	Cailungo	6	2	0	4	4	14	−10	6	

Source: soccerway.com
Rules for classification: 1) Points; 2) Goal difference; 3) Goals scored; 4) Head-to-head points; 5) Head-to-head goal difference; 6) Head-to-head goals scored; 7) Draw.

Home \ Away	CAI	FIO	J/D	LFI
Cailungo		0–1	0–4	0–5
Fiorentino	2–0		4–0	1–2
Juvenes/Dogana	1–2	1–1		2–0
La Fiorita	1–2	1–0	2–0	

Updated to match(es) played on 30 March 2016. Source:
Legend: Blue = home team win; Yellow = draw; Red = away team win.

=== Group D ===
Pos	Team	Pld	W	D	L	GF	GA	GD	Pts	Qualification
1	Folgore	6	4	1	1	16	10	+6	13	Knockout stage
2	Tre Fiori	6	3	1	2	18	10	+8	10	Knockout stage
3	San Giovanni	6	1	0	5	6	20	−14	3	

Source: soccerway.com
Rules for classification: 1) Points; 2) Goal difference; 3) Goals scored; 4) Head-to-head points; 5) Head-to-head goal difference; 6) Head-to-head goals scored; 7) Draw.

==== Matches 1–4 ====
Home \ Away	FOL	SGI	TFI
Folgore		4–0	3–3
San Giovanni	0–2		0–4
Tre Fiori	1–2	5–1	

Updated to match(es) played on 31 January 2016. Source:
Legend: Blue = home team win; Yellow = draw; Red = away team win.

==== Matches 5–6 ====
Home \ Away	FOL	SGI	TFI
Folgore		2–4	
San Giovanni			1–3
Tre Fiori	2–3		

Updated to match(es) played on 30 March 2016. Source:
Legend: Blue = home team win; Yellow = draw; Red = away team win.

== Knockout stage ==
The knockout stage involved the eight teams that qualified as winners and runners-up of each of the four groups in the group stage.

All matches were decided over one leg with extra time and then penalties used to break ties.

In the quarter-finals, teams from the same group could not be drawn against each other. In the draws for the semi-finals all teams could be drawn against each other. In all rounds, home team was decided in the draw.

The draw was announced on 8 April 2016, with the entire knockout stage being known.

=== Qualified teams ===
Group	Winners	Runners-up
A	Domagnano	Tre Penne
B	Libertas	Pennarossa
C	La Fiorita	Fiorentino
D	Folgore	Tre Fiori

=== Bracket ===
Quarter-finals
21 April – Dogana
La Fiorita (aet)	3
Tre Fiori	1
21 April – Fiorentino
Folgore	1 (4)
Tre Penne (aet; p)	1 (5)
21 April – San Marino
Libertas	1 (5)
Fiorentino (aet; p)	1 (6)
21 April – Domagnano
Domagnano	0 (3)
Pennarossa (aet; p)	0 (4)

Semi-finals
26 April – San Marino
La Fiorita	1
Tre Penne	0
26 April – Fiorentino
Fiorentino	1
Pennarossa	3

Final
1 May – Serravalle
La Fiorita	2
Pennarossa	0

=== Quarter-finals ===
This round involved all eight teams that qualified for the knockout stage.

21 April 2016
21:00

La Fiorita	3–1 (a.e.t.)	Tre Fiori
Selva 42'; M. Martini 98'; T. Zafferani 108'	FSGC; Soccerway	Lolli 24' (pen.)

Stadio di Dogana Ezio Conti, Dogana
Referee: Marco Avoni

21 April 2016
21:00

Folgore	1–1 (a.e.t.)	Tre Penne
Hirsch 33'	FSGC; Soccerway	Rispoli 33'
Penalties
Muccini (penalty scored); Rossi (penalty scored); Casadei (penalty scored); Valeriani (penalty missed)	3–5	(penalty scored) Valli; (penalty scored) Gai; (penalty scored) Friguglietti; (penalty scored) Gasperoni; (penalty scored) Rispoli

Campo sportivo di Fiorentino, Fiorentino
Referee: Michele Cruciani

21 April 2016
21:00

Libertas	1–1 (a.e.t.)	Fiorentino
Camillini 54'	FSGC; Soccerway	Pratelli 37'
Penalties
Parma (penalty missed); Nanni (penalty scored); Rocchi (penalty scored); Valle (penalty scored); A. Zavoli (penalty scored); Camillini (penalty scored); Rossi (penalty missed)	5–6	(penalty scored) Molinari; (penalty scored) Scarponi; (penalty scored) Ceccoli; (penalty scored) Pratelli; (penalty missed) Biordi; (penalty scored) Bernardi; (penalty scored) Jaupi

Campo sportivo di Fonte dell'Ovo, San Marino
Referee: Luca Barbeno

21 April 2016
21:00

Domagnano	0–0 (a.e.t.)	Pennarossa
	FSGC; Soccerway
Penalties
Rossi (penalty scored); Mami (penalty scored); Narducci (penalty missed); Chiarabini (penalty scored); Venerucci (penalty missed)	3–4	(penalty scored) N. Ciacci; (penalty scored) Agostinelli; (penalty scored) Del Pivo; (penalty missed) Stradaioli; (penalty scored) Farabegoli

Stadio di Domagnano, Domagnano
Referee: Michele Scarpino

=== Semi-finals ===
This round involved the four teams that advance from the quarter-finals.

26 April 2016
21:00

La Fiorita	1–0	Tre Penne
Gasperoni 84'	FSGC; Soccerway

Campo sportivo di Fonte dell'Ovo, San Marino
Referee: Daniele D’Adamo

26 April 2016
21:00

Fiorentino	1–3	Pennarossa
Jaupi 40'	FSGC; Soccerway	Fariselli 3'; Agostinelli 43'; N. Ciacci 64'

Campo sportivo di Fiorentino, Fiorentino
Referee: Marco Avoni

=== Final ===
The semi-final winners competed in one match to be the cup winner.

Winners, La Fiorita, earned a spot in the 2016–17 Europa League first qualifying round.

1 May 2016
21:00

La Fiorita	2–0	Pennarossa

San Marino Stadium, Serravalle
