= 2025–26 Campionato Sammarinese di Calcio =

San Marino football competition

Campionato Sammarinese di Calcio
- Season: 2025–26
- Dates: 29 August 2025 – May 2026
- Champions: Tre Fiori
- Champions League: Tre Fiori
- Matches: 112
- Goals: 297 (2.65 per match)
- Top goalscorer: Matthias Bonetti (28 goals)
- Biggest home win: Virtus 6–0 Cailungo (20 December 2025)
- Biggest away win: Faetano 0–6 Tre Penne (18 January 2026); Tre Penne 0–6 Domagnano (17 January 2026)
- Highest scoring: Folgore 6–1 Libertas (7 goals)
- All statistics correct as of 18 January 2026.

The 2025–26 Campionato Sammarinese di Calcio is the 41st season of league competition in San Marino, in which the country's 15 amateur football teams and the San Marino Academy U22 compete. The season began on 29 August 2025.

The winners (Tre Fiori) qualify for the 2026–27 UEFA Champions League first qualifying round. The Conference League play-off and 2025–26 Coppa Titano winners qualify for the 2026–27 UEFA Conference League first qualifying round.

== Participating teams ==
Locations of the Campionato Sammarinese di Calcio teams

Club	Location	Venue	Capacity
Cailungo	Cailungo	Campo Sportivo di Fonte dell'Ovo	500
Cosmos	Serravalle	San Marino Stadium	6,664
Domagnano	Domagnano	Campo Sportivo di Domagnano	1,000
Faetano	Faetano	Campo Sportivo di Faetano	500
Fiorentino	Fiorentino	Campo Sportivo di Fiorentino	700
Folgore	Falciano	Campo Sportivo di Serravalle B	1,200
Juvenes/Dogana	Dogana	Campo Sportivo di Dogana	500
La Fiorita	Montegiardino	Campo Sportivo di Montegiardino	500
Libertas	Borgo Maggiore	Campo Sportivo di Borgo Maggiore	1,000
Murata	Murata	Campo Sportivo di Montecchio	600
Pennarossa	Chiesanuova	Campo Sportivo di Chiesanuova	300
San Marino Academy U22	San Marino	Campo Sportivo di Acquaviva	2,000
San Giovanni	San Giovanni sotto le Penne	Campo Sportivo di San Giovanni	300
Tre Fiori	Fiorentino	Campo Sportivo di Fiorentino	700
Tre Penne	San Marino	Campo Sportivo di Fonte dell'Ovo	500
Virtus	Acquaviva	Campo Sportivo di Acquaviva	2,000

== First phase ==
=== League table ===
Pos	Team	Pld	W	D	L	GF	GA	GD	Pts	Qualification
1	Tre Fiori (C)	30	22	7	1	63	13	+50	73	Qualification for the Champions League first qualifying round
2	Virtus (O)	30	22	6	2	76	20	+56	72	Qualification for the Conference League play-off quarter-finals
3	Tre Penne	30	21	7	2	71	18	+53	70	Qualification for the Conference League play-off quarter-finals
4	La Fiorita (Note: La Florita were deducted 5 points due to administrative irregularities.)	30	17	11	2	64	25	+39	57	Qualification for the Conference League play-off quarter-finals and Conference League first qualifying round (Note: La Fiorita qualified as 2025–26 Coppa Titano winners.)
5	Folgore	30	16	9	5	67	33	+34	57	Qualification for the Conference League play-off quarter-finals
6	Domagnano	30	14	7	9	59	36	+23	49	Qualification for the Conference League play-off quarter-finals
7	Fiorentino	30	14	4	12	37	42	−5	46	Qualification for the Conference League play-off quarter-finals
8	Cosmos	30	11	9	10	30	23	+7	42	Qualification for the Conference League play-off first round
9	Juvenes/Dogana	30	9	10	11	36	38	−2	37	Qualification for the Conference League play-off first round
10	Libertas	30	9	8	13	32	63	−31	35	Qualification for the Conference League play-off first round
11	Pennarossa	30	8	8	14	29	53	−24	32	Qualification for the Conference League play-off first round
12	San Giovanni	30	7	10	13	24	43	−19	31	
13	Faetano	30	6	4	20	22	55	−33	22	
14	San Marino Academy U22	30	3	7	20	23	60	−37	16	
15	Cailungo	30	2	5	23	23	71	−48	11	
16	Murata (Note: Murata were deducted 9 points due to administrative irregularities.)	30	1	4	25	20	83	−63	−2	

Source: Flashscore
Rules for classification: 1) Points; 2) Head-to-head points; 3) head-to-head goal difference; 4) Head-to-head goals scored; 5)Goal difference; 6) Goals scored.
(C) Champions; (O) Play-off winners

=== Results ===
Home \ Away	CAI	COS	DOM	FAE	FTO	FOL	JUV	LFI	LIB	MUR	PEN	SGI	SMA	TFI	TPE	VIR
Cailungo		2–2	1–2	0–1	1–3	0–1	0–2	0–3	1–2	1–1	1–2	1–3	1–1	1–4	0–2	1–6
Cosmos	2–1		0–0	2–0	0–1	1–0	0–1	0–1	1–1	1–1	0–1	1–0	1–0	0–1	3–0	0–0
Domagnano	3–0	0–3		4–1	2–3	3–7	3–1	1–1	5–2	5–0	1–1	1–1	3–0	0–1	1–2	1–0
Faetano	3–2	0–0	0–1		0–3	0–2	0–1	1–2	1–1	2–0	1–2	1–0	2–4	0–1	0–6	0–2
Fiorentino	1–0	0–1	0–0	1–2		0–4	2–1	1–2	1–1	3–0	2–0	0–1	1–0	0–2	0–6	0–4
Folgore	3–0	0–0	2–1	2–0	3–0		1–1	1–1	6–1	3–2	3–0	2–2	3–0	2–2	1–3	1–2
Juvenes/Dogana	1–1	1–0	1–4	3–1	1–1	2–2		2–2	0–1	5–2	2–1	1–1	0–0	0–2	1–1	0–3
La Fiorita	3–0	3–1	1–1	3–1	0–1	2–2	2–1		2–2	3–1	5–0	3–0	2–0	2–2	1–1	1–1
Libertas	0–1	1–0	2–1	2–1	0–1	2–4	1–0	1–3		3–1	2–2	1–0	1–1	0–4	1–3	0–9
Murata	0–2	0–3	0–6	0–2	1–4	0–2	1–5	0–2	1–1		1–2	0–0	1–4	0–3	0–4	0–2
Pennarossa	2–0	1–1	0–4	0–0	2–4	2–3	0–0	0–5	0–1	2–0		2–1	3–1	0–0	1–2	0–3
San Giovanni	2–1	0–3	0–2	2–0	1–1	1–1	0–0	0–2	1–1	2–1	3–0		1–0	0–4	0–2	1–1
San Marino Academy U22	1–1	1–3	1–2	1–1	0–3	0–3	0–2	0–5	2–0	1–5	1–1	1–1		1–3	2–3	0–2
Tre Fiori	3–2	3–0	2–0	3–0	2–0	2–1	1–0	0–0	3–0	4–0	1–1	4–0	2–0		0–2	4–1
Tre Penne	6–1	1–1	0–0	3–0	2–0	1–1	3–1	2–0	5–0	2–0	2–0	4–0	1–0	0–0		1–1
Virtus	6–0	2–0	3–2	2–1	3–0	2–1	2–0	2–2	3–1	4–1	3–1	2–0	3–0	0–0	2–1	

Source: Flashscore
Legend: Blue = home team win; Yellow = draw; Red = away team win.

== Conference League play-off ==
Teams placed 2nd-11th qualified for the Conference League play-off, with the winners earning the second and final place in the Conference League first qualifying round.

=== Bracket ===
First round
9	Juvenes/Dogana	1
10	Libertas	1
8	Cosmos	3
11	Pennarossa	0

Quarter-finals
2	Virtus	0	2	2
9	Juvenes/Dogana	0	0	0
5	Folgore	1	1	2
6	Domagnano	0	3	3
3	Tre Penne	0	0	0
8	Cosmos	0	0	0
4	La Fiorita	1	2	3
7	Fiorentino	0	3	3

Semi-finals
2	Virtus	2	1	3
6	Domagnano	1	2	3
3	Tre Penne	1	0	1
4	La Fiorita	1	1	2

Final
2	Virtus	2
4	La Fiorita	1
Fourth place play-off
3	Tre Penne	3
6	Domagnano	1

Advanced due to the better position in the regular season.

==== First round ====
29 April 2026
18:45

Juvenes/Dogana	1–1	Libertas
Borghini 58'		Fabbri 65'

Juvenes/Dogana advanced due to higher league position in the regular season.

29 April 2026
18:45

Cosmos	3–0	Pennarossa
Islamaj 8'; Gjurchinoski 57'; Hamati 71'

==== Quarterfinals ====
3 May 2026
15:00

Virtus	0–0	Juvenes/Dogana

6 May 2026
20:45

Juvenes/Dogana	0–2	Virtus

Virtus won 2–0 on aggregate.

2 May 2026
15:00

Domagnano	0–1	Folgore
		Pancotti 75' (pen.)

5 May 2026
20:45

Folgore	1–3	Domagnano

Domagnano won 3–2 on aggregate.

3 May 2026
18:00

Tre Penne	0–0	Cosmos

6 May 2026
20:45

Cosmos	0–0	Tre Penne

0–0 on aggregate. Tre Penne advanced due to higher league position in the regular season.

2 May 2026
18:00

La Fiorita	1–0	Fiorentino
Barretta 84'

5 May 2026
20:45

Fiorentino	3–2	La Fiorita

3–3 on aggregate. La Fiorita advanced due to higher league position in the regular season.

==== Semifinals ====
9 May 2026
15:00

Virtus	2–1	Domagnano

12 May 2026
20:45

Domagnano	2–1	Virtus

3–3 on aggregate. Virtus advanced due to higher league position in the regular season.

9 May 2026
18:00

La Fiorita	1–1	Tre Penne

12 May 2026
20:45

Tre Penne	0–1	La Fiorita

La Fiorita won 2–1 on aggregate.

==== Fourth place play-off ====
16 May 2026
15:00

Tre Penne	3–1	Domagnano

==== Final ====
16 May 2026
17:00

Virtus	2–1	La Fiorita

== Season statistics ==
As of 19 April 2026

=== Top scorers ===
Rank	Player	Club	Goals
1	(Italy) Matthias Bonetti	Domagnano	28
3	(Italy) Matteo Prandelli	Tre Fiori	23
2	(Italy) Augusto Garcia Rufer	Folgore	25
4	(Italy) Imre Badalassi	Tre Penne	15
5	(Italy) Stefano Scappini	Virtus	15
6	(San Marino) Filippo Berardi	Tre Penne	13
7	(Italy) Antonio Bua	Cailungo	13
8	(Italy) Tommaso Leon Bernardi	Tre Fiori	13
9	(Italy) Matteo Zenoni	Virtus	12
10	(San Marino) Mattia Zanni	San Giovanni	10
