= 2014–15 Coppa Titano =

Tournament details
- Country: San Marino
- Teams: 15

The 2014−15 Coppa Titano is the cup's 57th season. It began on 27 August 2013. Libertas are the defending champion.

The winner of the 2014–15 Coppa Titano qualifies for the 2015–16 Europa League first qualifying round.

== Group stage ==
Teams play each other home and away. The top two from each group advance to the Knockout stage. The third placed teams play each other to determine two more teams to join them.

=== Group A ===
Pos	Team	Pld	W	D	L	GF	GA	GD	Pts	Qualification
1	Libertas	8	4	3	1	12	10	+2	15	Knockout stage
2	La Fiorita	8	4	2	2	14	6	+8	14	Knockout stage
3	Tre Penne	8	4	1	3	15	13	+2	13	Third place play–off
4	Cosmos	8	2	4	2	6	7	−1	10	
5	Domagnano	8	0	2	6	4	15	−11	2	

Source: soccerway.com
Rules for classification: 1) points; 2) goal difference; 3) number of goals scored; 4) head-to-head points; 5) head-to-head goal difference; 6) goals scored in head-to-head

Home \ Away	COS	DOM	LFI	LIB	TPE
Cosmos		1–1	0–0	0–1	1–1
Domagnano	1–2		1–2	0–0	0–3
La Fiorita	1–2	4–0		4–0	0–1
Libertas	0–0	1–0	1–1		3–1
Tre Penne	2–0	2–1	1–2	4–6	

Updated to match(es) played on 18 March 2015. Source: soccerway.com
Legend: Blue = home team win; Yellow = draw; Red = away team win.

=== Group B ===
Pos	Team	Pld	W	D	L	GF	GA	GD	Pts	Qualification
1	Folgore	8	6	1	1	17	4	+13	19	Knockout stage
2	Juvenes/Dogana	8	5	2	1	14	6	+8	17	Knockout stage
3	Pennarossa	8	4	1	3	15	7	+8	13	Third place play–off
4	Cailungo	8	1	1	6	4	24	−20	4	
5	Virtus	8	0	3	5	6	15	−9	3	

Source: soccerway.com
Rules for classification: 1) points; 2) goal difference; 3) number of goals scored; 4) head-to-head points; 5) head-to-head goal difference; 6) goals scored in head-to-head

Home \ Away	CAI	FOL	J/D	PEN	VIR
Cailungo		0–3	1–5	0–2	2–2
Folgore	5–0		1–2	2–0	2–0
Juvenes/Dogana	2–0	0–1		0–0	2–2
Pennarossa	5–0	1–2	1–2		2–1
Virtus	0–1	1–1	0–1	0–4	

Updated to match(es) played on 11 March 2015. Source: soccerway.com
Legend: Blue = home team win; Yellow = draw; Red = away team win.

=== Group C ===
Pos	Team	Pld	W	D	L	GF	GA	GD	Pts	Qualification
1	Murata	8	5	1	2	17	15	+2	16	Knockout stage
2	San Giovanni	8	5	0	3	17	11	+6	15	Knockout stage
3	Fiorentino	8	5	0	3	17	14	+3	15	Third place play–off
4	Faetano	8	3	1	4	9	12	−3	10	
5	Tre Fiori	8	1	0	7	8	16	−8	3	

Source: soccerway.com
Rules for classification: 1) points; 2) goal difference; 3) number of goals scored; 4) head-to-head points; 5) head-to-head goal difference; 6) goals scored in head-to-head

Home \ Away	FAE	FIO	MUR	SGI	TFI
Faetano		1–0	3–0	1–3	0–2
Fiorentino	3–2		4–1	1–4	3–2
Murata	1–1	3–2		4–1	2–1
San Giovanni	3–0	0–1	2–3		1–0
Tre Fiori	0–1	1–3	1–3	1–3	

Updated to match(es) played on 11 March 2015. Source: soccerway.com
Legend: Blue = home team win; Yellow = draw; Red = away team win.

== Third place play–off ==
The three third-place teams will play each other to determine which two teams will advance to the Elimination rounds.

Pos	Team	Pld	W	D	L	GF	GA	GD	Pts	Qualification
1	Pennarossa	2	1	1	0	2	1	+1	4	Knockout stage
2	Tre Penne	2	0	2	0	2	2	0	2	Knockout stage
3	Fiorentino	2	0	1	1	1	2	−1	1	

Updated to match(es) played on 18 March 2015. Source: soccerway.com
Rules for classification: 1) points; 2) goal difference; 3) number of goals scored; 4) head-to-head points; 5) head-to-head goal difference; 6) goals scored in head-to-head

Home \ Away	FIO	PEN	TPE
Fiorentino			1–1
Pennarossa	1–0		
Tre Penne		1–1	

Updated to match(es) played on 8 April 2015. Source: soccerway.com
Legend: Blue = home team win; Yellow = draw; Red = away team win.

== Knockout phase ==
=== Quarterfinals ===
The matches were played on 22 April 2015.

Team 1	Score	Team 2
Libertas	2-1	Pennarossa
Folgore Falciano Calcio	4-1	La Fiorita
Murata	3-1	Tre Penne
San Giovanni	1-1 (4-5 p)	Juvenes/Dogana

22 April	Libertas	2–1	Pennarossa	Dogana
17:00	Gianluca Morelli 28'; Alessandro Giunta 56'		Armando Aruci 6'	Stadium: Stadio di Dogana Ezio Conti; Referee: Krisztina Széles

22 April	Folgore Falciano Calcio	4–1	La Fiorita	Fiorentino
19:00	Fabio Ceschi 26'; Adolfo Hirsch 42', 50'; Luca Rossi 68'		Gianluca Bollini 10'	Stadium: Campo sportivo di Fiorentino; Referee: Luca Tura

22 April	Murata	3–1	Tre Penne	San Marino
19:00	Alessandro Mattia Cuttone 72'; Francesco Sternini 77'; Michael Angelini 90+3'		Mario Fucili 5'	Stadium: Campo sportivo di Fonte dell'Ovo; Referee: Daniele D’Adamo

22 April	San Giovanni	1–1 (4–5 p)	Juvenes/Dogana	Domagnano
19:00	Luca Mosconi 18'		Daniele Villa 90+2'	Stadium: Stadio di Domagnano; Referee: Pietro Magliano

=== Semifinals ===
The matches were played on 27 April 2015.

Team 1	Score	Team 2
Libertas	0-1 (a.e.t.)	Folgore Falciano Calcio
Murata	2-1 (a.e.t.)	Juvenes/Dogana

=== Final ===
The match was played on 30 April 2015.

Team 1	Score	Team 2
Folgore Falciano Calcio	5–0	Murata
