= 2022–23 Campionato Sammarinese di Calcio =

San Marino football competition

Campionato Sammarinese di Calcio
- Season: 2022–23
- Dates: 2 September 2022 – 20 May 2023
- Champions: Tre Penne
- Champions League: Tre Penne
- Conference League: Cosmos; La Fiorita
- Matches: 210
- Goals: 629 (3 per match)
- Top goalscorer: Matteo Prandelli (21 goals)
- Biggest home win: Fiorentino 6–0 Cailungo (16 April 2023)
- Biggest away win: Pennarossa 0–7 Libertas (11 April 2023)
- Highest scoring: Fiorentino 2–5 Faetano (9 October 2022); San Giovanni 4–3 Fiorentino (14 October 2022); Virtus 5–2 Domagnano (21 January 2023); Faetano 2–5 Murata (4 March 2023); Cailungo 5–2 Faetano (6 April 2023); Fiorentino 2–5 Pennarossa (6 April 2023); Pennarossa 0–7 Libertas (11 April 2023); Cailungo 1–6 Juvenes/Dogana (23 April 2023)
- Longest winning run: 7 matches Tre Penne; Tre Fiori
- Longest unbeaten run: 24 matches Cosmos
- Longest winless run: 11 matches Murata
- Longest losing run: 9 matches Murata
- All statistics correct as of 23 April 2023.

The 2022–23 Campionato Sammarinese di Calcio is the 38th season of league competition in San Marino, in which the country's top 15 amateur football teams competed. The season began on 2 September 2022 and ended in May 2023.

== Participating teams ==
Locations of the 2022–23 Campionato Sammarinese di Calcio teams

Club	Location
Cailungo	Cailungo
Cosmos	Serravalle
Domagnano	Domagnano
Faetano	Faetano
Fiorentino	Fiorentino
Folgore	Falciano
Juvenes/Dogana	Dogana
La Fiorita	Montegiardino
Libertas	Borgo Maggiore
Murata	Murata
Pennarossa	Chiesanuova
San Giovanni	San Giovanni sotto le Penne
Tre Fiori	Fiorentino
Tre Penne	San Marino
Virtus	Acquaviva

== First phase ==
The regular season is being contested by fifteen teams who played each other twice. The top team will be crowned champion and will qualify to the Champions League preliminary round. The teams in rank 2 through 11 qualify to the play-offs, in which the teams ranked 2 through 7 will receive a bye to the first round. The winners of the play-offs will advance to the Europa Conference League first qualifying round.

=== League table ===
Pos	Team	Pld	W	D	L	GF	GA	GD	Pts	Qualification
1	Tre Penne (C)	28	21	5	2	60	19	+41	68	Qualification for the Champions League preliminary round
2	Cosmos (O)	28	20	7	1	64	13	+51	67	Qualification for the Play-offs quarterfinals to Europa Conference League
3	La Fiorita	28	18	6	4	41	17	+24	60	Qualification for the Play-offs quarterfinals to Europa Conference League
4	Virtus	28	16	9	3	53	25	+28	57	Qualification for the Play-offs quarterfinals to Europa Conference League
5	Tre Fiori	28	17	5	6	45	21	+24	56	Qualification for the Play-offs quarterfinals to Europa Conference League
6	Libertas	28	12	11	5	49	33	+16	47	Qualification for the Play-offs quarterfinals to Europa Conference League
7	Folgore	28	9	4	15	32	49	−17	31	Qualification for the Play-offs quarterfinals to Europa Conference League
8	Murata	28	9	3	16	41	57	−16	30	Qualification for the Play-offs first round to Europa Conference League
9	Juvenes/Dogana	28	8	5	15	40	46	−6	29	Qualification for the Play-offs first round to Europa Conference League
10	Domagnano	28	6	8	14	36	48	−12	26	Qualification for the Play-offs first round to Europa Conference League
11	Faetano	28	7	4	17	35	63	−28	25	Qualification for the Play-offs first round to Europa Conference League
12	Pennarossa	28	7	4	17	39	57	−18	25	
13	San Giovanni	28	6	5	17	28	54	−26	23	
14	Fiorentino	28	5	8	15	37	58	−21	23	
15	Cailungo	28	4	6	18	29	69	−40	18	

Source: Flashscore
Rules for classification: 1) Points; 2) Goal difference; 3) Goals scored; 4) Head-to-head points; 5) head-to-head goal difference; 6) Head-to-head goals scored.
(C) Champions; (O) Play-off winners

=== Results ===
Home \ Away	CAI	COS	DOM	FAE	FTO	FOL	JUV	LFI	LIB	MUR	PEN	SGI	TFI	TPE	VIR
Cailungo		0–0	0–0	5–2	2–2	2–4	1–6	0–1	1–2	4–1	2–1	0–3	0–3	0–2	1–3
Cosmos	5–1		2–0	4–0	4–0	5–0	4–0	1–1	1–0	4–1	1–0	4–0	1–1	1–0	1–1
Domagnano	3–0	1–2		2–3	1–1	2–1	1–3	0–1	1–1	2–2	0–1	3–0	1–3	1–2	1–2
Faetano	3–0	0–2	1–4		0–2	0–3	3–3	0–3	1–3	2–5	2–1	0–1	1–2	0–2	2–2
Fiorentino	6–0	0–1	0–0	2–5		1–1	0–4	0–1	3–2	1–0	2–5	1–3	0–3	1–5	1–2
Folgore	4–1	0–4	0–2	0–0	1–0		1–2	0–1	2–3	4–1	2–1	1–2	0–2	0–4	1–1
Juvenes/Dogana	0–2	0–2	1–1	2–2	1–2	2–0		0–1	0–3	0–2	3–1	1–2	0–1	0–1	1–3
La Fiorita	2–0	2–0	2–3	4–0	3–1	2–0	1–0		1–0	2–0	2–0	2–2	1–0	0–1	0–1
Libertas	1–1	1–1	3–0	2–1	3–3	0–0	2–1	1–1		0–0	3–3	1–0	0–0	0–1	2–2
Murata	2–1	2–3	5–1	0–2	2–1	0–2	2–2	1–2	2–3		2–4	3–1	0–1	1–4	1–2
Pennarossa	3–0	0–4	2–2	0–2	1–1	4–0	1–4	1–2	0–7	2–3		4–0	0–1	1–4	1–3
San Giovanni	1–1	0–3	1–1	0–2	4–3	2–3	0–1	1–1	1–3	0–2	1–1		0–2	2–3	0–2
Tre Fiori	2–2	0–2	2–1	4–0	2–1	2–0	4–1	1–1	1–2	0–1	2–0	1–0		1–2	1–1
Tre Penne	3–0	2–2	2–0	2–0	1–1	1–2	2–2	1–1	4–0	2–0	2–0	3–1	2–1		2–1
Virtus	4–2	0–0	5–2	3–1	1–1	2–0	1–0	2–0	1–1	5–0	0–1	2–0	1–2	0–0	

Source: Flashscore
Legend: Blue = home team win; Yellow = draw; Red = away team win.

== Play-offs ==
=== Bracket ===
First round
8	Murata	0
11	Faetano	1
9	Juvenes/Dogana	3
10	Domagnano	2

Quarterfinals
2	Cosmos	4	3	7
11	Faetano	1	0	1
5	Tre Fiori	1	1	2
6	Libertas	2	1	3
3	La Fiorita	2	3	5
9	Juvenes/Dogana	0	0	0
4	Virtus	1	1	2
7	Folgore	1	1	2

Semifinals
2	Cosmos	2	1	3
6	Libertas	0	0	0
3	La Fiorita	0	2	2
4	Virtus	0	1	1

Final
2	Cosmos	2
3	La Fiorita	1

=== First round ===
26 April 2023
20:45

Murata	0–1	Faetano

26 April 2023
20:45

Juvenes/Dogana	3–2	Domagnano

=== Quarterfinals ===
29 April 2023
15:00

Libertas	2–1	Tre Fiori

3 May 2023
20:45

Tre Fiori	1–1	Libertas

Libertas won 3–2 on aggregate.

29 April 2023
15:00

Virtus	1–1	Folgore

3 May 2023
20:45

Folgore	1–1	Virtus

2–2 on aggregate. Virtus won on away goals.

30 April 2023
15:00

Cosmos	4–1	Faetano

3 May 2023
20:45

Faetano	0–3	Cosmos

Cosmos won 7–1 on aggregate.

30 April 2023
15:00

La Fiorita	2–0	Juvenes/Dogana

3 May 2023
20:45

Juvenes/Dogana	0–3	La Fiorita

La Fiorita won 5–0 on aggregate.

=== Semifinals ===
6 May 2023
15:00

Cosmos	2–0	Libertas

14 May 2023
15:00

Libertas	0–1	Cosmos

Cosmos won 3–0 on aggregate.

7 May 2023
15:00

Virtus	0–0	La Fiorita

13 May 2023
15:00

La Fiorita	2–1	Virtus

La Fiorita won 2–1 on aggregate.

=== Final ===
20 May 2023
20:45

Cosmos	2–1	La Fiorita

== Top scorers ==
As of 23 April 2023

Rank	Player	Club	Goals
1	(Italy) Matteo Prandelli	Cosmos	21
2	(San Marino) Mattia Stefanelli	Pennarossa	17
3	(Italy) Imre Badalassi	Tre Penne	15
3	(Argentina) Emiliano Olcese	Libertas	15
3	(Italy) Raul Ura	Murata	15
6	(Albania) Marseljan Mema	Faetano	14
7	(Italy) Alessandro Torsani	Fiorentino	13
8	(Italy) Nicola Angeli	Virtus	11
8	(Morocco) Mohamed Ben Kacem	Libertas	11
8	(Italy) Davide Merli	Juvenes/Dogana	11
