= 2025–26 Coppa Titano =

Tournament details
- Country: San Marino
- Teams: 15

Final positions
- Champions: La Fiorita (8th title)
- Runners-up: Tre Fiori

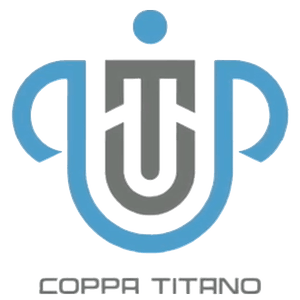

The 2025–26 Coppa Titano was the sixty-eight edition of the football competition in San Marino. 15 of the 16 2025–26 Campionato Sammarinese di Calcio clubs participated. The winners qualified for the first qualifying round of the 2026–27 UEFA Conference League.

Virtus are the defending champions. They got knocked out in semifinals by Tre Fiori

== First round ==
14 clubs entered the first round; defending champions Virtus received a bye. The first legs were held on 23 and 24 September 2025, followed by the second legs on 20 and 21 October 2025.

Team 1	Agg.	Team 2	1st leg	2nd leg
Tre Penne	5–2	Domagnano	3–0	2–2
Cailungo	2–2 (3–4 p)	Libertas	1–1	1–1
San Giovanni	3-3 (2–4 p)	Cosmos	0–2	3–1
Fiorentino	2–5	Juvenes/Dogana	2–2	0–3
Pennarossa	1–4	Tre Fiori	1–1	0–3
Murata	3–1	Faetano	2–0	1–1
Folgore	0–1	La Fiorita	0–0	0–1

== Quarter-finals ==
The seven first round winners and Virtus entered the quarter-finals. The first legs were held on 26 November 2025, followed by the second legs, which were played on 10 December 2025.

Team 1	Agg.	Team 2	1st leg	2nd leg
Virtus	6–1	Libertas	3–0	3–1
Cosmos	1–7	Tre Fiori	0–4	1–3
Tre Penne	1–2	Juvenes/Dogana	1–1	0–1
Murata	2–4	La Fiorita	0–3	2–1

== Semi-finals ==
The four quarter-final winners entered the semi-finals. The first legs were held on 4 March 2026, followed by the second legs on 18 March 2026.

Team 1	Agg.	Team 2	1st leg	2nd leg
Virtus	0–1	Tre Fiori	0–0	0–1
Juvenes/Dogana	1–2	La Fiorita	0–0	1–2

== Final ==
23 May 2026
20:00

Tre Fiori	1–3	La Fiorita
Benedettini 4'	Report	Olcese 41', 52'; Barretta 64'

San Marino Stadium, Serravalle
Attendance: 545
Referee: William Villa

== Bracket ==
First round
Cailungo	1	1	2 (3)
Libertas	1	1	2 (4)
San Giovanni	0	3	3 (2)
Cosmos	2	1	3 (4)
Pennarossa	1	0	1
Tre Fiori	1	3	4
Tre Penne	3	2	5
Domagnano	0	2	2
Fiorentino	2	0	2
Juvenes/Dogana	2	3	5
Murata	2	1	3
Faetano	0	1	1
Folgore	0	0	0
La Fiorita	0	1	1

Quarterfinals
Virtus	3	3	6
Libertas	0	1	1
Cosmos	0	1	1
Tre Fiori	4	3	7
Tre Penne	1	0	1
Juvenes/Dogana	1	1	2
Murata	0	2	2
La Fiorita	3	1	4

Semifinals
Virtus	0	0	0
Tre Fiori	0	1	1
Juvenes/Dogana	0	1	1
La Fiorita	0	2	2

Final
Tre Fiori	1
La Fiorita	3
