= 2011–12 Campionato Sammarinese di Calcio =

Campionato Sammarinese di Calcio
- Season: 2011–12
- Champions: Tre Penne
- Champions League: Tre Penne
- Europa League: Libertas; La Fiorita
- Matches played: 118
- Goals scored: 350 (2.97 per match)
- Top goalscorer: Cristian Rubén Menin (12)
- Biggest home win: Fiorentino 7–0 Faetano
- Biggest away win: Fiorentino 0–7 La Fiorita
- Highest scoring: Tre Penne 6–2 Fiorentino

The 2011–12 Campionato Sammarinese di Calcio season was the twenty-seventh since its establishment. The season began with the first regular season games on 17 September 2011 and ended with the play-off final in May 2012. Tre Fiori are the defending league champions, having won their seventh Sammarinese championship and third-in-a-row last season. The title was won by S.P. Tre Penne.

== Participating teams ==
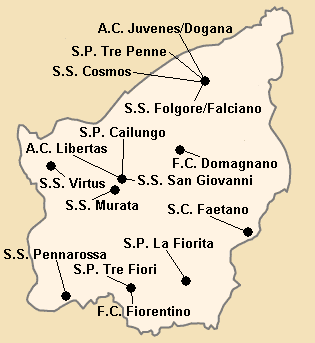
2011–12 Campionato Sammarinese di Calcio team distribution

Because there is no promotion or relegation in the league, the same 15 teams who competed in the league last season competed in the league this season.

- S.P. Cailungo (Borgo Maggiore)
- S.S. Cosmos (Serravalle)
- F.C. Domagnano (Domagnano)
- S.C. Faetano (Faetano)
- S.S. Folgore/Falciano (Serravalle)
- F.C. Fiorentino (Fiorentino)
- A.C. Juvenes/Dogana (Serravalle)
- S.S. Pennarossa (Chiesanuova)
- S.P. La Fiorita (Montegiardino)
- A.C. Libertas (Borgo Maggiore)
- S.S. Murata (San Marino)
- S.S. San Giovanni (Borgo Maggiore)
- S.P. Tre Fiori (Fiorentino)
- S.P. Tre Penne (Serravalle)
- S.S. Virtus (Acquaviva)

== Venues ==
The teams do not have grounds of their own due to restricted space in San Marino. Each match was randomly assigned to one of the following grounds:

- Stadio Olimpico (Serravalle)
- Campo di Fiorentino (Fiorentino)
- Campo di Acquaviva (Chiesanuova)
- Campo di Dogana (Serravalle)
- Campo Fonte dell'Ovo (Domagnano)
- Campo di Serravalle "B" (Serravalle)

== Regular season ==
The 15 clubs are split into two groups; one with eight clubs and another with seven clubs.

=== Group A ===
Pos	Team	Pld	W	D	L	GF	GA	GD	Pts	Qualification
1	Libertas	21	10	9	2	37	24	+13	39	Qualification for the championship play–offs
2	Cosmos	21	10	5	6	29	23	+6	35	Qualification for the championship play–offs
3	Faetano	21	10	3	8	32	34	−2	33	Qualification for the championship play–offs
4	Pennarossa	21	9	3	9	25	28	−3	30 (Note: PEN 1–0 MUR; MUR 0–1 PEN)	
5	Murata	21	9	3	9	30	32	−2	30	
6	San Giovanni	21	5	7	9	32	29	+3	22	
7	Cailungo	21	4	7	10	21	29	−8	19	
8	Domagnano	21	2	3	16	11	45	−34	9	

Source: fsgc.sm (in Italian), UEFA.com
Rules for classification: 1) points; 2) head-to-head points; 3) head-to-head goal difference; 4) head-to-head goals scored; 5) goal difference; 6) number of goals scored.

=== Group B ===
Pos	Team	Pld	W	D	L	GF	GA	GD	Pts	Qualification
1	Tre Fiori	20	15	4	1	44	14	+30	49	Qualification for the championship play–offs
2	La Fiorita	20	12	5	3	42	20	+22	41	Qualification for the championship play–offs
3	Tre Penne	20	11	3	6	37	24	+13	36	Qualification for the championship play–offs
4	Virtus	20	9	3	8	25	25	0	30	
5	Fiorentino	20	8	3	9	30	33	−3	27	
6	Juvenes/Dogana	20	3	9	8	23	31	−8	18	
7	Folgore	20	2	3	15	14	41	−27	9	

Source: fsgc.sm (in Italian), UEFA.com
Rules for classification: 1) points; 2) head-to-head points; 3) head-to-head goal difference; 4) head-to-head goals scored; 5) goal difference; 6) number of goals scored.

=== Results ===
All teams will play twice against the teams within their own group and once against the teams from the other group. This means that the clubs in the eight-club group will play 21 matches each while the clubs in the seven-club group will play 20 matches each during the regular season.

Home \ Away	CAI	COS	DOM	FAE	FIO	FOL	J/D	LFI	LIB	MUR	PEN	SGI	TFI	TPE	VIR
Cailungo		1–2	1–1	2–2		3–2			0–1	0–1	1–2	1–1	0–2	0–1	2–1
Cosmos	1–0		2–2	1–0	3–0		2–4	1–2	1–1	1–3	2–1	1–0	1–1	1–2	1–0
Domagnano	2–0	0–1		0–5	0–1	1–2	1–1	0–2	0–3	0–5	2–1	0–3			
Faetano	0–2	0–4	2–0				1–2	2–0	2–1	1–2	2–0	2–1			
Fiorentino	1–1			7–0		1–0	1–0	0–7	0–3	4–0			0–2	2–3	0–0
Folgore		0–0		0–2	0–4		0–2	0–1	3–3		1–3		0–3	1–4	0–1
Juvenes/Dogana	0–0				0–1	1–1		1–2			1–1	2–2	0–1	0–4	2–2
La Fiorita	1–1				1–1	3–1	2–2		0–0	3–0	4–0	2–2	1–2	1–0	2–1
Libertas	2–1	1–1	2–0	2–2			2–2			3–1	1–0	2–1	2–2	0–3	1–0
Murata	1–2	3–1	1–0	1–1		1–0	3–2		2–2		0–1	1–2	0–4		1–2
Pennarossa	4–2	1–0	1–0	2–3	1–2				1–3	1–0		1–1		0–1	
San Giovanni	1–1	1–2	6–0	1–2	2–1	2–3			2–2	1–3	1–2			2–0	0–1
Tre Fiori			3–1	4–1	2–1	2–0	3–1	3–0 (Note: This match originally ended 0-0, but was awarded to Tre Fiori 3-0 afterwards.)			1–1	0–0		3–1	2–3
Tre Penne			2–1	2–0	6–2	2–0	0–0	1–3		1–1			1–2		2–2
Virtus			1–0	0–2	2–1	2–0	2–0	2–5			0–1		0–2	3–1	

Source: UEFA.com
Legend: Blue = home team win; Yellow = draw; Red = away team win.

== Play-off ==
The playoff was held in a double-eliminination format. Both group winners earned byes in the first and second round.

=== First round ===
5 May 2012
21:15 CET

Cosmos	1–4	Tre Penne
Pagnoni 22'		Di Giuli 10' (pen.); Cardini 60'; Luconi 62'; Valli 77'

Stadio Olimpico, Serravalle
Referee: Gabriele Ricucci

5 May 2012
21:15 CET

La Fiorita	1–1 (a.e.t.)	Faetano
Mottola 39' (pen.)		Franklin 45+2' (pen.)
Penalties
	2–4

Stadio Olimpico, Serravalle
Referee: Paolo Cappetta

=== Second round ===
10 May 2012
21:15 CET

Tre Penne	2–1 (a.e.t.)	Faetano
Pignieri 23'; Luconi 120'		Valentini 36'

Stadio Olimpico, Serravalle
Referee: Fabrizio Perotto

9 May 2012
21:15 CET

Cosmos	1–0	La Fiorita
Menin 48'

Stadio Olimpico, Serravalle
Referee: Gabriele Rossi

La Fiorita were eliminated. They have qualified for the first qualifying round of the 2012–13 UEFA Europa League by winning the 2011–12 Coppa Titano.

=== Third round ===
11 May 2012
21:15 CET

Libertas	1–1 (a.e.t.)	Tre Fiori
De Luigi 33'		Giunta 87'
Penalties
	5–3

Stadio Olimpico, Serravalle

14 May 2012
21:15 CET

Cosmos	2–1	Faetano
Bugli 34'; Lazzarini 55'		Viroli 5'

Stadio Olimpico, Serravalle

Faetano were eliminated.

=== Fourth round ===
16 May 2012
21:15 CET

Libertas	1–1 (a.e.t.)	Tre Penne
Rocchi 65'		Cibelli 29'
Penalties
	3–2

Stadio Olimpico, Serravalle

18 May 2012
21:15 CET

Cosmos	0–0 (a.e.t.)	Tre Fiori
Penalties
	5–6

Stadio Olimpico, Serravalle

Cosmos were eliminated.

=== Semifinal ===
23 May 2012
21:00 CET

Tre Penne	2–1	Tre Fiori
Cibelli 45', 73'		Baizan 30'

Stadio Olimpico, Serravalle

=== Final ===
The winner of the final will qualify for the first qualifying round of the 2012–13 UEFA Champions League, while the runner-up will qualify for the first qualifying round of the 2012–13 UEFA Europa League.

29 May 2012
21:00 CET

Libertas	0–1	Tre Penne
		Valli 75'

Stadio Olimpico, Serravalle
