= 2013 Super Coppa Sammarinese =

Tre Penne	La Fiorita
2	1
- Date: 31 August 2013
- Venue: Campo di Fiorentino, Fiorentino
- Referee: (Italy) Luca Barbeno

The 2013 Super Coppa Sammarinese was the second Super Coppa Sammarinese football match. It was contested by Tre Penne, the winner of the 2012–13 Campionato Sammarinese di Calcio, and La Fiorita the winner of the 2012–13 Coppa Titano. The match was held on 31 August 2013 at the Campo di Fiorentino.

Tre Penne defeated La Fiorita, 2–1, to win their first Super Coppa.

== Match details ==
31 August 2013
20:00

Tre Penne	2–1	La Fiorita
Cibelli 26', 78'	Report	Selva 82'

Campo di Fiorentino, Fiorentino, San Marino
