= Prandelli =

Prandelli is an Italian surname. Notable people with the surname include:

- Cesare Prandelli (born 1957), Italian footballer and manager
- Giacinto Prandelli (1914–2010), Italian opera singer
- Matteo Prandelli (born 1988), Italian footballer
