= Gialloblu =

Gialloblu means "the yellow and blue ones" in Italian ("giallo" means yellow and "blu" means blue). It is the nickname and the colours worn by some Italian football clubs such as:

- Hellas Verona F.C.
- Parma F.C.
- SP La Fiorita (San Marino)
