= Grandoni =

Grandoni is an Italian surname. Notable people with the surname include:

- Alessandro Grandoni (born 1977), Italian football coach and former player
- Andrea Grandoni (born 1997), Sanmarinese football player
