= Ventoso (surname) =

Ventoso; is a surname of Spanish origin. Notable people with that name include:

- Francisco Ventoso (born 1982), Spanish cyclist
- José Armando Ufarte Ventoso (born 1941), Spanish football player and manager

== See also ==
- Ventoso, a curazia of San Marino
