= 1986–87 Campionato Sammarinese di Calcio =

Campionato Sammarinese di Calcio
- Season: 1986–87
- Champions: S.P. La Fiorita

The 1986–87 Campionato Sammarinese di Calcio season was the 2nd season since its establishment. It was contested by 9 teams, and S.P. La Fiorita won the championship.

== Regular season ==
Pos	Team	Pld	W	D	L	GF	GA	GD	Pts	Qualification or relegation
1	S.C. Faetano	16	9	6	1	33	12	+21	24	Qualification for the championship play–offs
2	S.S. Montevito	16	8	5	3	35	19	+16	21	Qualification for the championship play–offs
3	S.P. La Fiorita	16	7	6	3	21	12	+9	20	Qualification for the championship play–offs
4	G.S. Dogana	16	6	7	3	27	19	+8	19	Qualification for the championship play–offs
5	S.S. Murata	16	5	6	5	23	24	−1	16	
6	A.C. Libertas	16	3	8	5	20	24	−4	14	
7	S.P. Cailungo	16	3	5	8	17	28	−11	11	
8	S.S. San Giovanni	16	3	5	8	16	24	−8	11	Relegation to the Serie A2
9	S.P. Tre Penne (Note: 1 point deducted.)	16	2	4	10	19	47	−28	7	Relegation to the Serie A2

Source: rsssf.com

=== Results ===
Home \ Away	CAI	DOG	FAE	LFI	LIB	MON	MUR	SGI	TPE
Cailungo		1–0	2–2	0–0	0–0	0–2	1–3	1–1	1–3
Dogana	4–2		0–0	2–1	4–2	1–3	1–1	0–0	2–1
Faetano	4–1	2–0		1–0	2–2	4–0	6–0	2–0	3–1
La Fiorita	2–0	1–1	1–1		2–0	1–1	0–0	2–1	2–0
Libertas	1–1	0–0	1–0	0–2		1–1	2–1	2–3	3–3
Montevito	2–0	1–1	2–1	2–2	0–0		3–1	2–1	12–2
Murata	2–1	1–2	1–1	1–1	1–0	1–1		0–0	7–3
San Giovanni	2–3	2–2	0–2	1–0	2–3	1–0	0–2		0–0
Tre Penne	0–2	0–7	1–2	1–3	2–2	1–2	1–1	2–1	

Legend: Blue = home team win; Yellow = draw; Red = away team win.

== Championship playoff ==
=== Semifinals ===
- S.C. Faetano 2-0 G.S. Dogana
- S.P. La Fiorita 0-0 (pen 5-4) S.S. Montevito

=== Final ===
- S.P. La Fiorita 2-0 S.C. Faetano
