= Paolo Montagna =

Sammarinese footballer

Personal information
- Date of birth: May 28, 1976 (age 50)
- Position: Forward

Senior career*
Years	Team	Apps	(Gls)
1994–2000	Juvenes		
2000–2002	Cosmos		
2002–2006	Juvenes/Dogana		
2006–2012	Cosmos	95	(46)

International career^{‡}
1995–2011	San Marino	47	(0)
- * Club domestic league appearances and goals as of 15 April 2022 ‡ National team caps and goals as of 15 April 2022

Paolo Montagna (born 28 May 1976) is a retired Sammarinese footballer who last played for Cosmos.

He was capped by the San Marino national football team over forty times after making his international debut in 1995.

== Honours ==
=== Club ===
SS Cosmos

- Campionato Sammarinese: 2000–01

=== Individual ===
- Pallone di Cristallo: 2011
