= Federico Nanni =

Sammarinese footballer

Personal information
- Full name: Federico Nanni
- Date of birth: 22 September 1981 (age 45)
- Place of birth: San Marino
- Height: 1.80 m (5 ft 11 in)
- Position: Attacking midfielder

Senior career*
Years	Team	Apps	(Gls)
2002–2005	Juvenes/Dogana		
2005–2006	Tre Penne		
2006–2007	Libertas		
2007–2008	Sant'Ermete		
2008–2010	Juvenes/Dogana	20	(1)
2010–2013	Tre Penne	44	(2)
2013–2014	Pennarossa	18	(1)
2014–2015	San Giovanni	9	(0)
2015–2016	Libertas	23	(2)

International career
2005–2011	San Marino	7	(0)
- * Club domestic league appearances and goals

Federico Nanni (born 22 September 1981) is a Sammarinese former footballer who played as an attacking midfielder. He made seven appearances for the San Marino national team.
