= Federico Valentini =

Sammarinese footballer

Personal information
- Date of birth: January 22, 1982 (age 44)
- Place of birth: San Marino
- Height: 6 ft 4 in (1.93 m)
- Position: Goalkeeper

Team information
- Current team: Cosmos

Senior career*
Years	Team	Apps	(Gls)
2001–2002	Valleverde Riccione F.C.	3	(0)
2003–2006	Murata	0	(0)
2006–2007	Sporting Novafeltria	0	(0)
2007–2008	Tre Fiori	10	(0)
2008–2009	PD Fontanelle	0	(0)
2009–2010	AS Real Misano	0	(0)
2010–2015	Tre Penne	83	(0)
2016–2017	Virtus	21	(0)
2017–2018	Libertas	0	(0)
2020	Tre Penne	0	(0)
2020–2021	Pennarossa	3	(0)
2023	S.S. Cosmos	0	(0)

International career^{‡}
2006–2013	San Marino	13	(0)
- * Club domestic league appearances and goals as of 17 June 2023 ‡ National team caps and goals as of 18 July 2020

Federico Valentini (born 22 January 1982) is a retired San Marinese footballer who last played for Cosmos and for many other amateur Sammarinese and Italian sides as well as for the San Marino national football team.

== Club career ==
He was part of Tre Penne's team for their 1–0 win over Shirak F.C. of Armenia in the first qualifying round of the 2013–14 UEFA Champions League. It was the first win by a Sammarinese club in European competition.

== Personal life ==
He works as a bank clerk.
