= Simone Loiodice =

Italian footballer

Personal information
- Date of birth: March 16, 1989 (age 37)
- Place of birth: Rome, Italy
- Height: 1.78 m (5 ft 10 in)
- Position: Midfielder

Team information
- Current team: SP Tre Penne
- Number: 8

Youth career
- 2005–2008: Roma
- 2008–2009: Rimini

Senior career*
| Years | Team | Apps | (Gls) |
| 2009–2010 | Rimini | 0 | (0) |
| 2009–2010 | → San Marino (loan) | 4 | (0) |
| 2010–2012 | San Marino | 53 | (0) |
| 2012–2013 | Mezzocorona | 34 | (1) |
| 2013 | Deruta | 13 | (0) |
| 2014 | Formigine | 10 | (0) |
| 2014 | SS Folgore/Falciano | 2 | (0) |
| 2014–2015 | Ribelle | 35 | (2) |
| 2015-2016 | San Marino Calcio | 31 | (0) |
| 2016-2016 | Rimini | ? | (?) |
| 2017-2017 | Recanatese | 11 | (0) |
| 2017-2022 | La Fiorita | 85 | (2) |
| 2022-2025 | S.S. Cosmos | 91 | (5) |
| 2025- | SP Tre Penne | 26 | (0) |

International career
| 2004–2005 | Italy U-16 | 5 | (0) |
| 2005 | Italy U-17 | 7 | (0) |
| 2006 | Italy U-19 | 2 | (0) |
| 2006 | Italy U-18 | 1 | (0) |
- * Club domestic league appearances and goals as of 1 July 2025

Simone Loiodice (Italian pronunciation: [loˈjɔːditʃe]; born March 16, 1989, in Rome) is an Italian professional football player who currently plays for SP Tre Penne.
