= Luca Ceccaroli =

Sammarinese footballer (born 1995)

Personal information
- Full name: Luca Ceccaroli
- Date of birth: 5 July 1995 (age 31)
- Place of birth: San Marino
- Position: Midfielder

Team information
- Current team: Cosmos
- Number: 10

Senior career*
Years	Team	Apps	(Gls)
2011–2012	San Marino Calcio		
2012–2013	Cattolica		
2013–2014	Real Misano		
2014–2019	Domagnano	76	(13)
2019	→ Tre Penne (loan)	12	(7)
2019–2025	Tre Penne	129	(40)
2025–	Cosmos	22	(3)

International career^{‡}
2011	San Marino U17	3	(0)
2012–2013	San Marino U19	6	(0)
2013–2016	San Marino U21	9	(0)
2019–2023	San Marino	19	(0)
- * Club domestic league appearances and goals as of 5 June 2026 ‡ National team caps and goals as of 14 October 2023

Luca Ceccaroli (born 5 July 1995) is a Sammarinese footballer who plays as a midfielder for Tre Penne and the San Marino national team.

== Career ==
Ceccaroli made his international debut for San Marino on 13 October 2019 in a UEFA Euro 2020 qualifying match against Scotland, which finished as a 0–6 away loss.

== Career statistics ==
=== International ===
As of 14 October 2023

San Marino
Year	Apps	Goals
2019	2	0
2020	4	0
2021	4	0
2022	6	0
2023	3	0
Total	19	0

== Personal life ==
Ceccaroli works at a jewellery factory.
