= Monte San Cristoforo =

Mountain in San Marino

Coordinates: 43°54′25″N 12°27′53″E

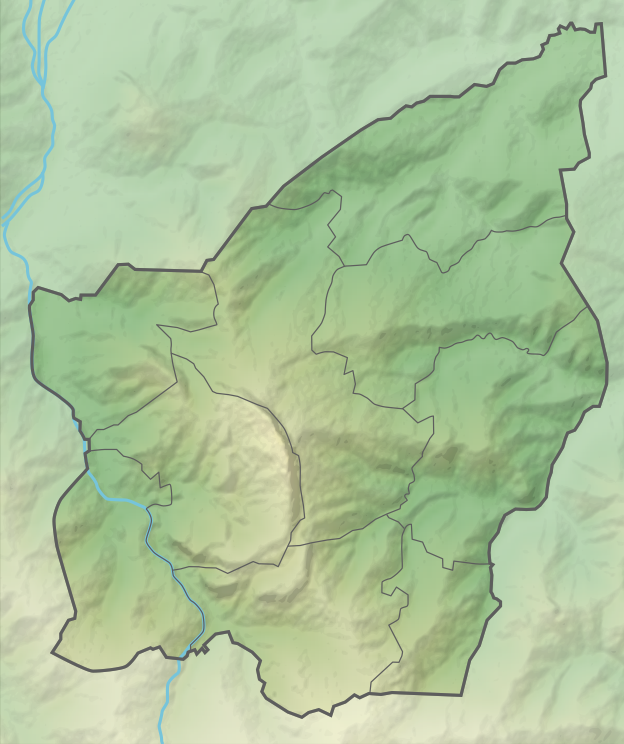
Map

Monte San Cristoforo is a mountain of southern San Marino. It is located between the towns of Fiorentino and Montegiardino, and rises to a height of 534 metres.
