= Ventoso =

Curazia of Borgo Maggiore, San Marino

- Curazia
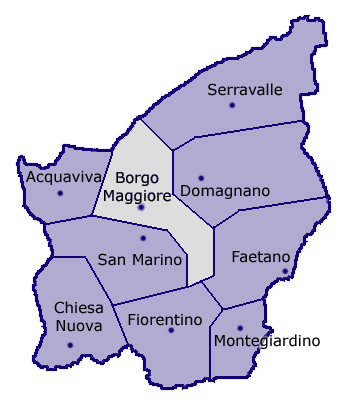
- Location of Borgo Maggiore within San Marino

- Location within San Marino
- Coordinates: 43°57′16.74″N 12°26′24.65″E
- Country: San Marino
- Castello: Borgo Maggiore
- Elevation: 360 m (1,180 ft)

Population (2006)
  - Total: 200
- Demonym: ventosani
- Time zone: UTC+1 (CET)
  - Summer (DST): UTC+2 (CEST)
- Postal code: 47893
- Area code: +378 (0549)

Ventoso (lit. 'windy') is a curazia of San Marino, in the castello of Borgo Maggiore.

== History ==
The village was an Ancient Roman castrum, known as Castrum Ventosi. It knew a rapid growing in the last decade of the 20th century.

== Geography ==
Ventoso is located in north of its municipality, very close to the borders to Acquaviva and to the Italian municipality of Verucchio. The village is linked with the Italian town by a road from Borgo Maggiore. Its main street is named Decima Gualdaria.
