= Antonio Bua =

Italian footballer (born 1990)

Personal information
- Full name: Antonio Bua
- Date of birth: August 23, 1990 (age 36)
- Place of birth: Palermo, Italy
- Height: 6 ft 0 in (1.83 m)
- Position: Attacking midfielder

Youth career
- 2009–2012: York College

Senior career*
Years	Team	Apps	(Gls)
2013–	Harrisburg City Islanders	4	(0)
- * Club domestic league appearances and goals as of 6 August 2013 ‡ National team caps and goals as of 6 August 2013

Antonia Bua (born 23 August 1990) is an Italian footballer who played for the Harrisburg City Islanders in USL Pro.

== Career ==
=== High school and college ===
Bua attended Lampeter-Strasburg High School. In 2008, he was named an all-state selection along with Andrew Wenger and Zarek Valentin, both of whom were drafted into Major League Soccer.

Bua played college soccer for York College of Pennsylvania. Over his college career, Bua registered 66 total points on 28 goals and ten assists in 87 games. Included in his 28 career goals were nine game-winning goals. Bua was a 3-time All-CAC selection with the Spartans and was part of the team that won four straight conference championships.

=== Professional ===
After trialing with the Harrisburg City Islanders for several weeks, Bua was signed by the club on 3 July 2013. The trial included an impressive performance against the Philadelphia Union of Major League Soccer in which Bua played 26 minutes as a substitute. Bua made his professional league debut on 14 July 2013 in a 0–1 loss to the Richmond Kickers.
