= Andrea Grandoni =

Sammarinese footballer

Personal information
- Full name: Andrea Grandoni
- Date of birth: 23 March 1997 (age 29)
- Place of birth: San Marino
- Position: Defender

Team information
- Current team: La Fiorita
- Number: 32

Youth career
- San Marino Calcio

Senior career*
Years	Team	Apps	(Gls)
2015–2016	Savignanese	29	(0)
2016–2017	Ravenna	1	(0)
2017–2018	Juvenes/Dogana		
2018	San Marino Calcio	0	(0)
2018–2020	Marignanese		
2020–2024	La Fiorita	81	(5)
2024–2025	Cosmos	31	(5)
2025–	La Fiorita	31	(1)

International career^{‡}
2012	San Marino U-17	1	(0)
2014	San Marino U-19	3	(0)
2014–	San Marino U-21	11	(0)
2017–	San Marino	37	(0)
- * Club domestic league appearances and goals as of 5 June 2026 ‡ National team caps and goals as of 20 March 2024

Andrea Grandoni (born 23 March 1997) is a Sammarinese football player who plays as a defender for La Fiorita.

== Career ==
Grandoni debuted with the senior national team on 1 September 2017 in a 2018 FIFA World Cup qualification against Northern Ireland.

== Personal life ==
Grandoni is attaining a master's degree in motor sciences while also playing football.
