= Tommaso Zafferani =

Sammarinese footballer

Personal information
- Full name: Tommaso Zafferani
- Date of birth: February 19, 1996 (age 30)
- Position: Right winger

Team information
- Current team: S.P. La Fiorita
- Number: 33

Senior career*
Years	Team	Apps	(Gls)
2015–	S.P. La Fiorita	189	(13)

International career^{‡}
2012	San Marino U17	3	(0)
2013–2014	San Marino U19	6	(0)
2014–2018	San Marino U21	15	(0)
2016–	San Marino	20	(0)
- * Club domestic league appearances and goals as of 5 June 2026 ‡ National team caps and goals as of 20 November 2023

Tommaso Zafferani (born 19 February 1996) is a Sammarinese footballer who currently plays for La Fiorita. He has been capped by the San Marino national football team, making his debut in 2016.
