= Marco de Luigi =

Sammarinese footballer

Personal information
- Full name: Marco de Luigi
- Date of birth: March 21, 1978 (age 48)
- Place of birth: San Marino
- Height: 1.73 m (5 ft 8 in)
- Position: Forward

Senior career*
Years	Team	Apps	(Gls)
2000–2001	S.S. Murata	5	(1)
2001–2002	S.P. Caliugno		(9)
2002–2003	A.C. Juvenes/Dogana		(7)
2003–2006	S.S. Murata	7	(7)
2006–2007	Saludecio Calcio		
2007–2008	SS Virtus	13	(1)
2008–2009	AC Juvenes/Dogana	10	(2)
2009–2013	A.C. Libertas	71	(15)
2013–2015	S.S. Cosmos	24	(0)

International career^{‡}
1999–2007	San Marino	18	(0)
- * Club domestic league appearances and goals as of 18 July 2020 ‡ National team caps and goals as of 18 July 2020

Marco de Luigi (born 21 March 1978) is a retired Sammarinese footballer who last played for Cosmos.
