= Vladimir Mikhaylovskiy =

Russian footballer

Personal information
- Full name: Vladimir Yevgenyevich Mikhaylovskiy
- Date of birth: 22 June 1989 (age 37)
- Place of birth: Tolyatti, Russian SFSR
- Height: 1.85 m (6 ft 1 in)
- Position: Defender

Team information
- Current team: Valmontone
- Number: 5

Youth career
- Konoplyov football academy

Senior career*
Years	Team	Apps	(Gls)
2006	Akademiya Tolyatti	9	(0)
2007	Krylia Sovetov Samara	0	(0)
2008	Akademiya Tolyatti	20	(4)
2009–2014	Tre Penne	107+	(8+)
2014–2018	Gozzano	75+	(7)
2018	Avellino	10	(0)
2018–2019	Fenegrò Calcio	14	(1)
2019–2020	Polisportiva Vastogirardi	23	(3)
2020–2023	Sanremese	109	(5)
2023–2024	Vado	29	(2)
2024–2025	Città di Varese	33	(0)
2025	Valmontone		
- * Club domestic league appearances and goals as of 7 agoust 2025

Vladimir Yevgenyevich Mikhaylovskiy (Russian: Владимир Евгеньевич Михайловский; born 22 June 1989) is a Russian footballer who plays for Italian Serie D club Valmontone calcio. Besides Russia, he has played in San Marino and Italy.

== Career ==
In 2009, he signed for Tre Penne. In 2020, he signed for Sanremese.

In July 2023, Mikhaylovskiy moved to Vado, still in Serie D.
