= Gianluca Vivan =

Italian footballer

Personal information
- Date of birth: 27 December 1983 (age 42)
- Place of birth: Rome, Italy
- Position: Goalkeeper

Team information
- Current team: La Fiorita
- Number: 27

Senior career*
Years	Team	Apps	(Gls)
2001–2002	Benevento	0	(0)
2002–2003	Comprensorio Stabia	27	(0)
2003–2004	Tivoli	0	(0)
2004	Castel di Sangro	0	(0)
2004–2005	Benevento	0	(0)
2005–2007	Sangiovannese	2	(0)
2006	→ Lecco (loan)	2	(0)
2007–2008	Cisco Roma	0	(0)
2008	Viterbese	3	(0)
2008–2009	Rovigo	31	(0)
2009–2010	Colligiana	32	(0)
2010–2015	San Marino	80	(0)
2015–	La Fiorita	207	(0)
- * Club domestic league appearances and goals as of 25 June 2026

Gianluca Vivan (born 27 December 1983) is an Italian footballer. He plays as a goalkeeper for La Fiorita.
