= 2016–17 Coppa Titano =

Tournament details
- Country: San Marino
- Teams: 15

Final positions
- Champions: S. P. Tre Penne
- Runners-up: S.P. La Fiorita

The 2016–17 Coppa Titano was the 59th season of the competition. The tournament began on 13 September 2016 and ended on 26 April 2017.

The winner of the cup (S. P. Tre Penne) qualified for the Europa League.

== Format ==
The fifteen clubs from San Marino were drawn into four groups. The winners and runners-up from each group advanced to the knockout stage.

== Group stage ==
The clubs played six matches against the other clubs in their group. In groups A, B, and C the clubs played each other twice. In group D the clubs played each other three times.

=== Group A ===
Pos	Team	Pld	W	D	L	GF	GA	GD	Pts	Qualification
1	Libertas	6	4	2	0	12	2	+10	14	Knockout stage
2	Pennarossa	6	3	1	2	11	10	+1	10	Knockout stage
3	Cailungo	6	3	1	2	6	6	0	10	
4	Cosmos	6	0	0	6	3	14	−11	0	

Source: soccerway.com
Rules for classification: 1) Points; 2) Goal difference; 3) Goals scored; 4) Head-to-head points; 5) Head-to-head goal difference; 6) Head-to-head goals scored; 7) Draw.

Home \ Away	CAI	COS	LIB	PEN
Cailungo		2–1	0–2	1–0
Cosmos	0–2		0–1	0–3
Libertas	0–0	2–1		6–0
Pennarossa	3–1	4–1	1–1	

Legend: Blue = home team win; Yellow = draw; Red = away team win.

=== Group B ===
Pos	Team	Pld	W	D	L	GF	GA	GD	Pts	Qualification
1	Folgore	6	5	0	1	16	5	+11	15	Knockout stage
2	Fiorentino	6	3	1	2	9	7	+2	10	Knockout stage
3	Domagnano	6	2	1	3	8	15	−7	7	
4	Juvenes/Dogana	6	1	0	5	5	11	−6	3	

Source: soccerway.com
Rules for classification: 1) Points; 2) Goal difference; 3) Goals scored; 4) Head-to-head points; 5) Head-to-head goal difference; 6) Head-to-head goals scored; 7) Draw.

Home \ Away	DOM	FIO	FOL	J/D
Domagnano		1–3	2–1	1–3
Fiorentino	1–1		1–4	2–0
Folgore	6–1	1–0		2–0
Juvenes/Dogana	1–2	0–2	1–2	

Legend: Blue = home team win; Yellow = draw; Red = away team win.

=== Group C ===
Pos	Team	Pld	W	D	L	GF	GA	GD	Pts	Qualification
1	Tre Penne	6	6	0	0	22	1	+21	18	Knockout stage
2	Faetano	6	3	0	3	11	12	−1	9	Knockout stage
3	Virtus	6	2	0	4	6	12	−6	6	
4	San Giovanni	6	1	0	5	2	16	−14	3	

Source: soccerway.com
Rules for classification: 1) Points; 2) Goal difference; 3) Goals scored; 4) Head-to-head points; 5) Head-to-head goal difference; 6) Head-to-head goals scored; 7) Draw.

Home \ Away	FAE	SGI	TPE	VIR
Faetano		4–1	1–5	2–3
San Giovanni	0–2		0–4	1–0
Tre Penne	3–0	3–0		1–0
Virtus	0–2	3–0	0–6	

Legend: Blue = home team win; Yellow = draw; Red = away team win.

=== Group D ===
Pos	Team	Pld	W	D	L	GF	GA	GD	Pts	Qualification
1	Tre Fiori	6	3	2	1	13	10	+3	11	Knockout stage
2	La Fiorita	6	3	1	2	16	11	+5	10	Knockout stage
3	Murata	6	1	1	4	9	17	−8	4	

Source: soccerway.com
Rules for classification: 1) Points; 2) Goal difference; 3) Goals scored; 4) Head-to-head points; 5) Head-to-head goal difference; 6) Head-to-head goals scored; 7) Draw.

==== Matches 1–4 ====
Home \ Away	LFI	MUR	TFI
La Fiorita		4–1	2–2
Murata	3–2		1–1
Tre Fiori	1–2	4–2	

Legend: Blue = home team win; Yellow = draw; Red = away team win.

==== Matches 5–6 ====
Home \ Away	LFI	MUR	TFI
La Fiorita		4–1	
Murata			1–2
Tre Fiori	3–2		

Legend: Blue = home team win; Yellow = draw; Red = away team win.

== Knockout stage ==
The draw for the knockout stage was held 21 March 2017.

=== Quarter-final ===
19 April 2017
20:45

Tre Fiori	3–1	Pennarossa

19 April 2017
20:45

La Fiorita	3–1	Libertas

20 April 2017
20:45

Tre Penne	2–1	Fiorentino

20 April 2017
20:45

Faetano	2–1	Folgore

=== Semi-final ===
22 April 2017
15:00

Tre Fiori	0–3	La Fiorita

23 April 2017
15:00

Tre Penne	2–1	Faetano

=== Final ===
26 April 2017
20:45

La Fiorita	0–2	Tre Penne

San Marino Stadium, Serravalle
Referee: Marco Avoni
