= Matteo Prandelli =

Italian footballer (born 1988)

Personal information
- Date of birth: 18 November 1988 (age 37)
- Place of birth: Brescia, Italy
- Height: 1.84 m (6 ft 0 in)
- Position: Forward

Team information
- Current team: Tre Fiori FC
- Number: 9

Youth career
- 2005–2007: Montichiari
- 2007: → Siena (loan)
- 2007–2008: Siena

Senior career*
Years	Team	Apps	(Gls)
2005–2007	Montichiari	7	(0)
2007	→ Siena (loan)	0	(0)
2007–2010	Siena	0	(0)
2008–2009	→ Val.d. Giovenco (loan)	9	(1)
2009–2010	→ Colligiana (loan)	7	(1)
2010–2011	Como	3	(0)
2011	Messina	1	(0)
2011–2012	Visé	27	(7)
2013	Kukësi	2	(0)
2013–2014	Sansepolcro	4	(0)
2014	Castellana	13	(5)
2014–2015	Colligiana	27	(12)
2015	Sambenedettese	5	(0)
2015–2016	Flaminia Civita Castellana	27	(9)
2016–2017	US San Teodoro	14	(1)
2017–2018	Lupa Roma	30	(8)
2018	Picerno	0	(0)
2018–2019	Anzio Calcio	34	(6)
2019	Vis Artena	12	(2)
2019–2020	Tivoli		
2020–2021	Boreale		
2021–2021	FC Rieti	17	(2)
2021–2021	Victor San Marino		
2021–2022	Gabicce Gradara		
2022–2024	S.S. Cosmos	60	(41)
2024–	Tre Fiori FC	61	(44)

International career
2010	Padania	19	(14)
- * Club domestic league appearances and goals as of 25 June 2026

Matteo Prandelli (born 18 November 1988) is an Italian footballer who plays as a forward for Tre Fiori FC as Captain.

Prandelli represents Padania and has competed in the CONIFA World Football Cup.

== Career ==
=== Montichiari ===
Prandelli started his professional career with A.C. Montichiari. He played for its reserve team since 2004–05 season. From 2005–06 Serie C2 to mid of 2006–07 Serie C2, Prandelli played 7 games for the first team.

=== Siena ===
In January 2007 Prandelli was signed by A.C. Siena in temporary deal. He was signed definitely at the end of season. He scored 16 goals for the reserve of Siena in 2007–08 Campionato Nazionale Primavera as team top-scorer.

=== Val.d. Giovenco ===
In mid-2008 Prandelli left for Valle del Giovenco of 2008–09 Lega Pro Seconda Divisione. He was the winner of the promotion playoffs.

=== Colligiana ===
In the next season he switched to Colligiana.

=== Como ===
On 1 February 2010 Prandelli moved up one level to third division club Calcio Como in co-ownership deal.

In June 2010 Siena gave up the remain 50% registration rights to Como after Siena relegated and lack of appearances of Prandelli. In 2010–11 season, Prandelli played for Como in 2010–11 Coppa Italia and scored once.

=== Messina ===
In January 2011 Prandelli left for 2010–11 Serie D club A.C.R. Messina. However, he only played once.

=== Visé ===
In mid-2011 Prandelli left for Belgian Second Division club Visé. On November 11 Prandelli had an unsuccessful trial at Brussels but 4 days later he had a trial at Belgian Second Division side Charleroi.

=== Sambenedettese ===
In August 2015 Prandelli left for 2015–16 Serie D club Sambenedettese Calcio. On September, 20th Prandelli debuts with his new team in the starting lineup of Sambenedettese - Castelfidardo Calcio, match won by Sambenedettese for 1–0.

=== Tivoli ===
Prandelli moved to Eccellenza club S.S.D. Tivoli Calcio 1919 in December 2019.

=== Tre Fiori FC ===
Prandeli was transferred to Tre Fiori FC on 01/07/2024 from S.S.Cosmos, having played two seasons with being the runner up in 2022–23_Campionato_Sammarinese_di_Calcio and also being the top goalscorer in it.

== Honours ==
Individual

- Campionato Sammarinese di Calcio Top Scorer: 2022–23, 2024–25
