= Adolfo Hirsch =

Sammarinese footballer (born 1986)

Personal information
- Full name: Adolfo José Hirsch
- Date of birth: 31 January 1986 (age 40)
- Place of birth: Guerrico, Buenos Aires, Argentina
- Height: 1.75 m (5 ft 9 in)
- Position: Striker

Team information
- Current team: Cailungo
- Number: 10

Youth career
- Banfield

Senior career*
Years	Team	Apps	(Gls)
2007	Juventud		
2008	Conesa		
2009–2012	Virtus	49	(22)
2012–2014	Cosmos	40	(17)
2014–2017	Folgore	65	(27)
2017–2019	La Fiorita	38	(8)
2019–2021	Pennarossa	23	(5)
2021–2022	Folgore	26	(2)
2022–2024	Fiorentino	47	(8)
2024–	Cailungo	48	(4)

International career^{‡}
2011–2023	San Marino	60	(0)
- * Club domestic league appearances and goals as of 5 June 2026 ‡ National team caps and goals as of 8 September 2023

Adolfo José Hirsch (born 31 January 1986) is a Sammarinese footballer who plays as a striker for Cailungo. Besides San Marino, he has played in Argentina.

== International career ==
An Argentine-born and raised player, Hirsch emigrated to San Marino in 2009. He made his international debut for San Marino on 10 August 2011, coming on as an 81st-minute substitute in a 0–1 friendly loss against Romania.

Hirsch confirmed that he had retired from the national team in September 2023 in an interview in March 2024.
