= 2011–12 Coppa Titano =

Tournament details
- Country: San Marino
- Teams: 15

Final positions
- Champions: La Fiorita
- Runners-up: Pennarossa
- UEFA Europa League: La Fiorita

Tournament statistics
- Matches played: 67
- Goals scored: 193 (2.88 per match)

The 2011-12 Coppa Titano was the 54th season of San Marino's oldest football competition. It began on 10 September 2011 with the first games of the Group Stage and ended on 2 May 2012 with the final held at Stadio Olimpico, Serravalle. Juvenes/Dogana were the defending champions, having won their second cup final last season.

The winner of the cup final entered the first qualifying round of the 2012–13 UEFA Europa League.

== Competition format ==
The competition consisted of two stages, the Group Stage and the Elimination Rounds. The Group Stage consisted of three groups with five teams each. Every team played two games (once "home" and once "away") against every other team of its group. The top two teams from each group, as well as the two best third-placed teams, qualified for the Elimination Rounds. The Elimination Rounds was a single-game elimination tournament. Games in the Elimination Rounds were decided by extra time and, if necessary, a penalty shootout.

== Group stage ==
=== Group A ===
Team	Pld	W	D	L	GF	GA	GD	Pts
Folgore	8	5	0	3	12	12	0	15
Cosmos	8	3	4	1	16	10	+6	13
Juvenes/Dogana	8	3	4	1	15	10	+5	13
Faetano	8	1	4	3	8	12	−4	7
Caliungo	8	2	0	6	6	13	−7	6

	CAI	COS	FAE	FOL	J/D
Calingo	–	1−3	1−0	1−2	0−1
Cosmos	2−0	–	0−0	1−2	1−1
Faetano	3−2	2−2	–	0−2	2−2
Folgore	0−1	1−4	2−0	–	2−1
Juvenes/Dogana	2−0	3−3	1−1	4−1	–

Source: fsgc.sm (in Italian)

=== Group B ===
Team	Pld	W	D	L	GF	GA	GD	Pts
La Fiorita	8	4	3	1	16	7	+9	15
Murata	8	3	4	1	12	11	+1	13
Tre Fiori	8	3	2	3	6	6	0	11
Fiorentino	8	3	1	4	9	9	0	10
Domagnano	8	1	2	5	8	18	−10	5

	DOM	FIO	LFI	MUR	TFI
Domagnano	–	0−1	0−0	3−3	0−2
Fiorentino	5−3	–	1−2	0−0	2−0
La Fiorita	3−0	2−0	–	2−2	2−2
Murata	4−1	1−0	1−5	–	0−0
Tre Fiori	0−1	1−0	1−0	0−1	–

Source: fsgc.sm (in Italian)

=== Group C ===
Team	Pld	W	D	L	GF	GA	GD	Pts
Libertas	8	4	2	2	10	7	+3	14
Tre Penne	8	3	4	1	14	5	+9	13
Pennarossa	8	3	4	1	15	10	+5	13
San Giovanni	8	2	3	3	17	19	−2	9
Virtus	8	0	3	5	7	22	−15	3

	LIB	PEN	SGI	TPE	VIR
Libertas	–	0−1	0−0	0−0	3−0
Pennarossa	1−2	–	3−3	1−1	1−0
San Giovanni	4−1	1−5	–	0−3	2−2
Tre Penne	0−1	1−1	4−1	–	1−1
Virtus	1−3	2−2	1−6	0−4	–

Source: fsgc.sm (in Italian)

== Elimination rounds ==
=== Quarterfinals ===
These matches took place on 23 April 2012.

Team 1	Score	Team 2
La Fiorita	4–0	Juvenes/Dogana
Libertas	3–0	Cosmos
Tre Penne	2–2 (aet), (p. 6–7)	Murata
Folgore	1–2 (aet)	Pennarossa

=== Semifinals ===
These matches took place on 27 April 2012.

Team 1	Score	Team 2
Murata	0–2 (aet)	Pennarossa
La Fiorita	1–0	Libertas

=== Final ===
2 May 2012

Pennarossa	2 – 3	La Fiorita

Stadio Olimpico, Serravalle
Referee: Leonardo Guidi
