= Borgo Maggiore =

Castello of San Marino

Borgo Maggiore E Bórgh (Romagnol)
- Castello
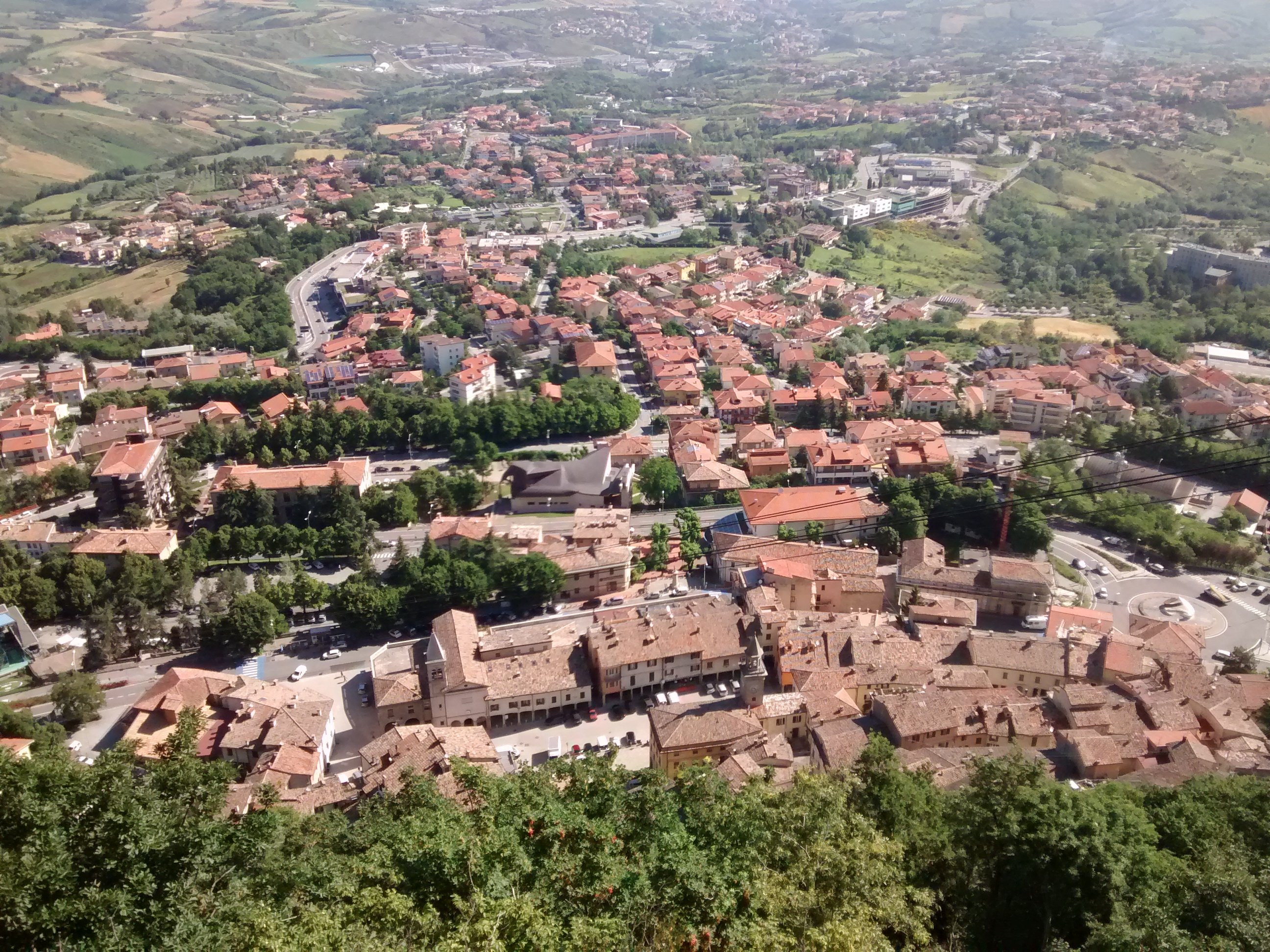
- Borgo Maggiore seen from San Marino

- Flag Coat of arms

- Borgo Maggiore's location in San Marino

- Location within San Marino
- Coordinates: 43°56′42.08″N 12°26′59″E
- Country: San Marino
- Curazie: List: Cà Melone, Cà Rigo, Cailungo (di Sopra and di Sotto), San Giovanni sotto le Penne, Valdragone (di Sopra and di Sotto), Ventoso

Government
  - Capitano: Silvia Marocci (Tutti per Borgo/PSD; since 2025)

Area
  - Total: 9.01 km^{2} (3.48 sq mi)
- Elevation: 525 m (1,722 ft)

Population (January 2025)
  - Total: 6,953
- Time zone: UTC+1 (CET)
  - Summer (DST): CEST
- Postal code: 47893
- Climate: Cfb
- Website: https://www.gov.sm/pub1/GovSM/Istituzioni-e-Forze/Giunte-di-Castello/Castello-di-Borgo-Maggiore.html

Borgo Maggiore (Italian pronunciation: [ˈborgo madˈdʒoːre]; Romagnol: E Bórgh; lit. 'Major borough') is one of the nine castelli of San Marino. It lies at the foot of Monte Titano and has a population of 6,953 (January 2025), making it the second largest town of San Marino after Dogana.

== History ==
The area was previously called Mercatale ("marketplace") and remains today the most important market town in San Marino. Though it is not the most populated, the Market, as well as the connection to San Marino City, make it very much a city-like shopping hub.

== Geography ==
Borgo Maggiore borders the Sammarinese castelli Serravalle, Domagnano, Faetano, Fiorentino, San Marino City, and Acquaviva and the Italian municipality Verucchio.

Borgo Maggiore contains eight curazie: Cà Melone, Cà Rigo, Cailungo (di Sopra and di Sotto), San Giovanni sotto le Penne, Valdragone (di Sopra and di Sotto), and Ventoso.

=== Climate ===
Borgo Maggiore has a humid subtropical climate (Köppen: Cfa).

Climate data for Borgo Maggiore
Month	Jan	Feb	Mar	Apr	May	Jun	Jul	Aug	Sep	Oct	Nov	Dec	Year
Mean daily maximum °C (°F)	8.7 (47.7)	10.0 (50.0)	13.0 (55.4)	16.4 (61.5)	21.0 (69.8)	25.9 (78.6)	28.5 (83.3)	28.2 (82.8)	23.6 (74.5)	19.2 (66.6)	14.0 (57.2)	9.9 (49.8)	18.2 (64.8)
Daily mean °C (°F)	6.0 (42.8)	6.9 (44.4)	9.8 (49.6)	13.1 (55.6)	17.7 (63.9)	22.4 (72.3)	24.9 (76.8)	24.4 (75.9)	20.1 (68.2)	16.0 (60.8)	11.3 (52.3)	7.3 (45.1)	15.0 (59.0)
Mean daily minimum °C (°F)	3.7 (38.7)	4.2 (39.6)	6.7 (44.1)	9.8 (49.6)	14.2 (57.6)	18.6 (65.5)	20.9 (69.6)	20.7 (69.3)	16.8 (62.2)	13.2 (55.8)	9.0 (48.2)	5.0 (41.0)	11.9 (53.4)
Average precipitation mm (inches)	57.1 (2.25)	65.9 (2.59)	66.0 (2.60)	64.5 (2.54)	69.7 (2.74)	42.0 (1.65)	37.2 (1.46)	49.1 (1.93)	77.0 (3.03)	81.2 (3.20)	84.8 (3.34)	72.5 (2.85)	767 (30.18)
Source: Weather.Directory

== Transport ==
Borgo Maggiore is the terminus of the San Marino Highway, a dual carriageway which runs to Dogana through Domagnano and Serravalle. After crossing the international border at Dogana, the highway continues through Italy as the SS72 state road to Rimini.

Borgo Maggiore is the base terminus of the Funivia di San Marino, an aerial cablecar system that connects the town to the City of San Marino. Running every fifteen minutes, the two-minute ride is renowned for its panoramic views over San Marino, the Province of Rimini, and the Adriatic Sea. The base station in Borgo Maggiore is located on Piazzale Campo della Fiera.

Five of San Marino's eight bus lines stop in Borgo Maggiore. Borgo Maggiore is also served by coaches running between Rimini and the City of San Marino.

Between 1932 and 1944, a 31.5-kilometre (19.6-mile) electrified narrow gauge railway operated between Rimini and the City of San Marino; Borgo Maggiore was the penultimate station on the Rimini–San Marino railway before the City. Its station was located on the present-day Via Ventotto Luglio, near Borgo Maggiore's elementary school and less than 100 metres (330 feet) downhill from the present-day Funivia terminus. The station was double-tracked, with one short track on the Rimini side serving the station's goods warehouse. During the Second World War, the line was bombed and closed. After the war, the railway was abandoned in favour of the San Marino Highway. Borgo Maggiore's railway station was demolished and became a car park.

Between 1961 and 1969, Compagnia Italiana Elicotteri operated helicopter flights between Borgo Maggiore and Rimini's port; the service was extended to San Leo in 1964. The cablecar to the City of San Marino was included in flight tickets, which would cost up to 12,500 lire. After the service's closure in 1969, the heliport was replaced by a parking lot for the Funivia.

== Points of interest ==
- Piazza Grande, town square

== International relations ==
Borgo Maggiore is twinned with:

- Catania, Italy (2015)
- Żurrieq, Malta (2001)

== Notable inhabitants ==
- Ilaria Bacciocchi (born 1990), Sanmarinese politician
- Alessandra Perilli (born 1988), Sanmarinese Olympic medallist (sport shooting)
- Manuel Poggiali (born 1983), Sanmarinese motorcycle racer
- Dalibor Riccardi (born 1983), Sanmarinese politician and Captain Regent of San Marino from October 2024 to April 2025

== Trivia ==
Borgo Maggiore serves as the headquarters of three political parties, the Socialist Party, Future Republic, and Tomorrow — Free Movement.
