= Domagnano =

Castello of San Marino

Domagnano Dmagnén (Romagnol) Montelupo
- Castello
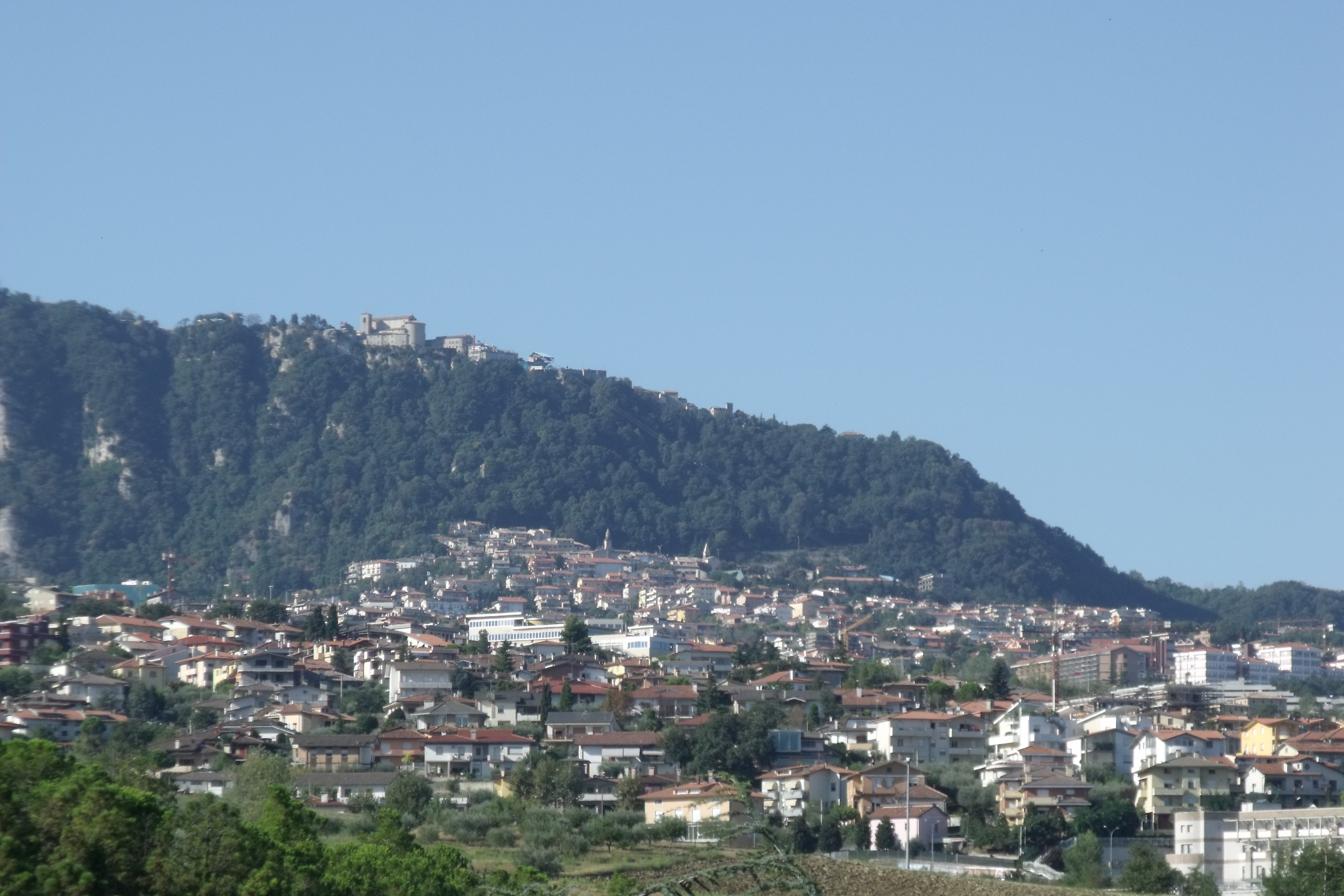
- View of Domagnano

- Flag Coat of arms

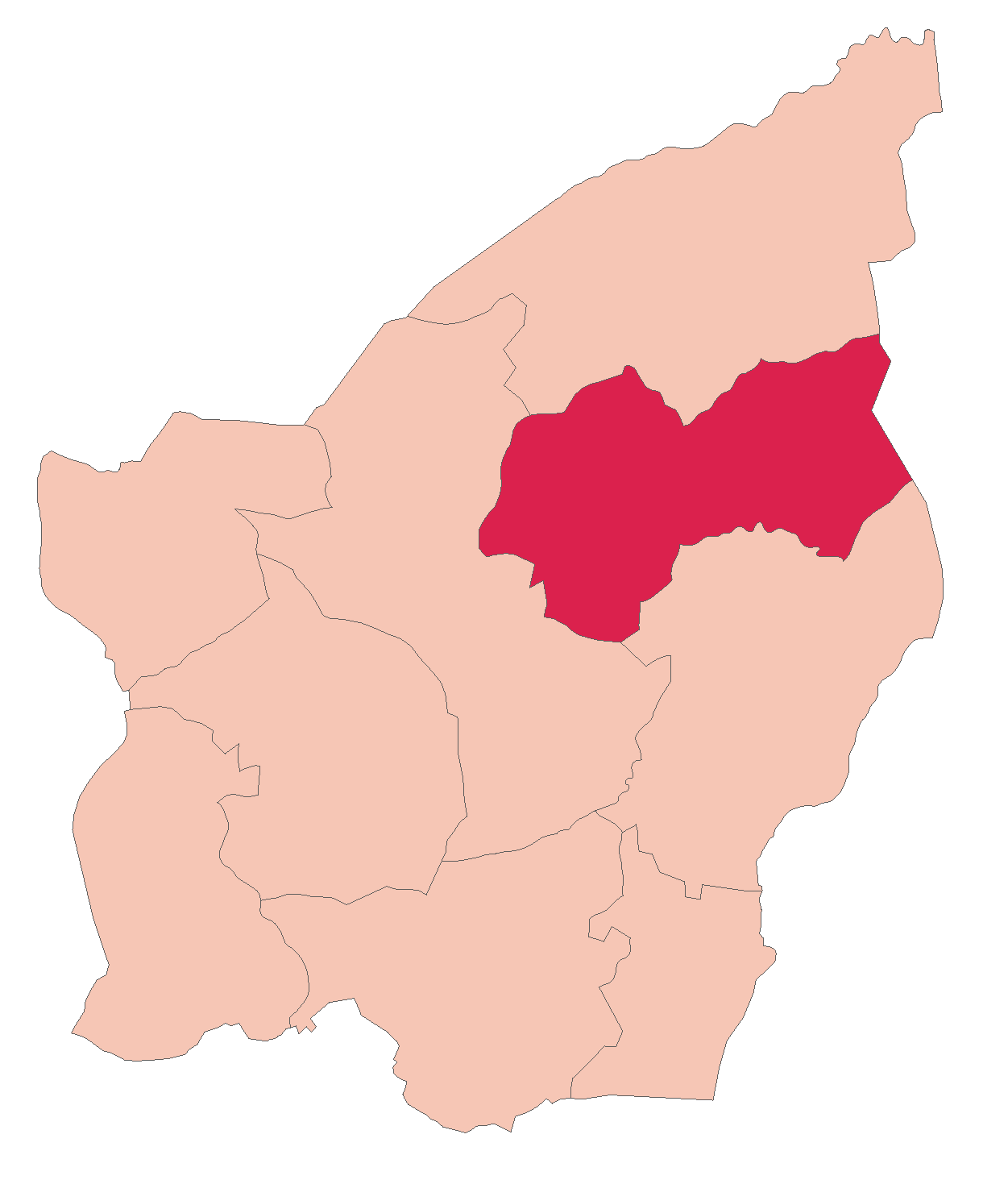
- Domagnano's location in San Marino

- Location within San Marino
- Coordinates: 43°57′N 12°28′E
- Country: San Marino
- Curazie: List: Cà Giannino, Fiorina, Piandivello, Spaccio Giannoni, Torraccia

Government
  - Capitano di Castello: Alberto Lazzari (Domagnano Insieme; since 2025)

Area
  - Total: 6.62 km^{2} (2.56 sq mi)
- Elevation: 357 m (1,171 ft)

Population (January 2025)
  - Total: 3,617
- Time zone: UTC+1 (CET)
  - Summer (DST): CEST
- Postal code: 47895
- Climate: Cfa
- Website: https://www.gov.sm/pub1/GovSM/Istituzioni-e-Forze/Giunte-di-Castello/Castello-di-Domagnano.html

Domagnano (Romagnol: Dmagnén) is one of the nine castelli of San Marino. It occupies an area of 6.62 km^{2} (2.56 sq mi). As of 2023, it had a population of 3,589 inhabitants. It is the fourth largest castello by land area and population in San Marino.

== History ==
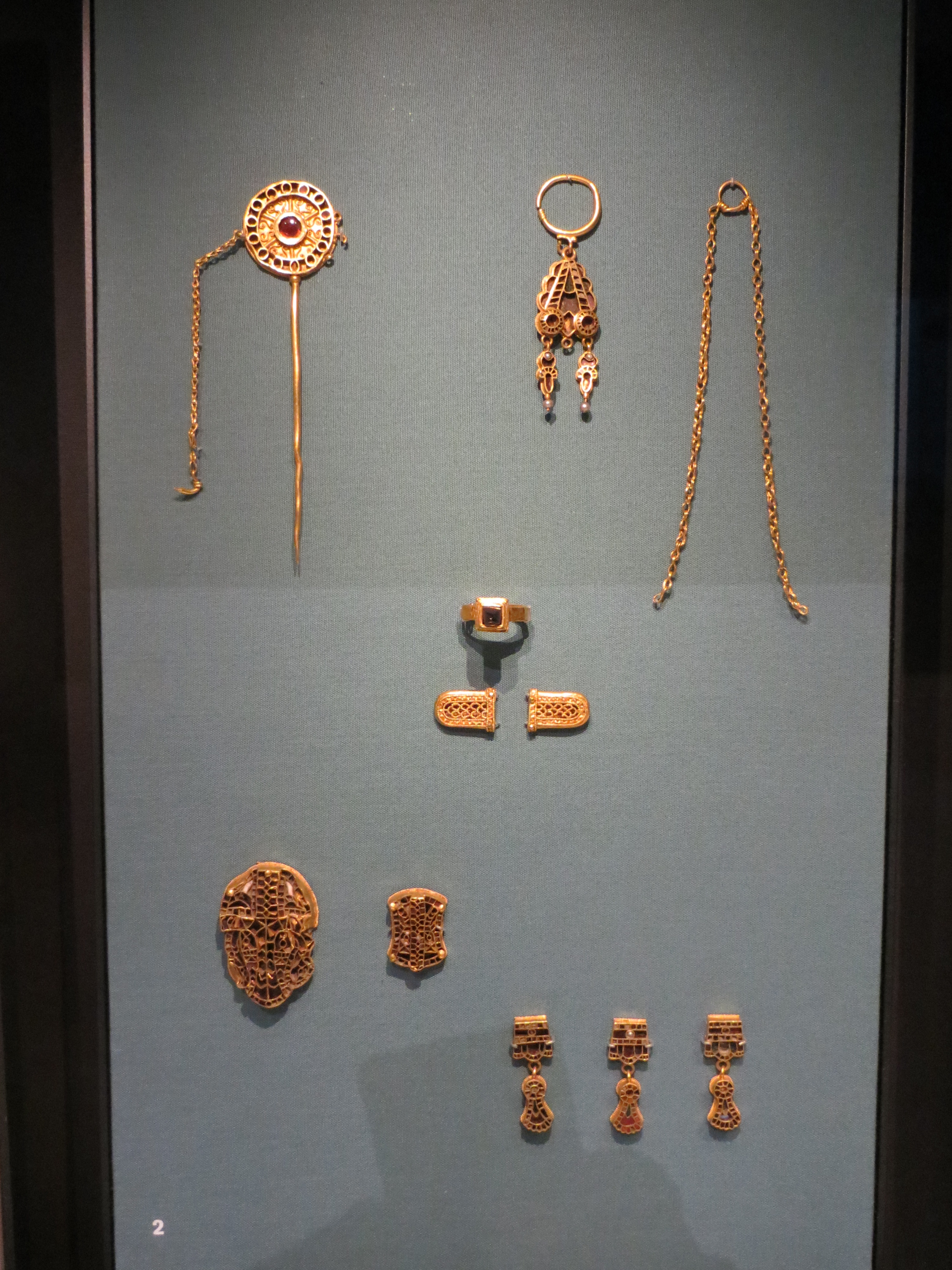
Gold jewellery from the Domagnano Treasure in the British Museum

Domagnano has been colonized since the Roman times and was previously known as Montelupo, the mountain of wolves. The Domagnano castle stood on top of the Mount Lupo overlooking the region. The name of the territory is derived from Latin. It might have come from "Domenianus" meaning "manor fund" or "Domus magnani" meaning the place occupied by one who worked with metals. Its coat of arms consists of a white wolf and hill top with a tower.

Archeological evidence from the Roman times, including several coins and jewellery were found in the region later. It was discovered at the Lagucci farm in 1893 during farming. It is estimated to be from the 5th century CE. The treasure consists of gold objects, copper figurines, and other metal articles. It was sold off by antique dealers as obtained from Italy and the true origin was unknown. Only in 1973, German historian Volker Bierbrauer discovered the true origins of the treasure. The so-called Domagnano Treasure is now split between a number of museums including the San Marino State Museum, Germanisches Nationalmuseum in Nuremberg and British Museum.

The territory passed on to San Marino in 1463. A church stands on the area of the mountain where the fortress once stood. The Torraccia festival is organized by the inhabitants of the region every year at the location.

== Geography ==
The country of San Marino is divided into nine municipalities (castelli) for administration. It has a land area of 6.62 km^{2} (2.56 sq mi), making it the fourth largest castello in the country. It borders the Sammarinese castelli of Faetano, Borgo Maggiore, Serravalle and shares border with the Italian municipality of Coriano.

Domagnano contains five curazie–Cà Giannino, Fiorina, Piandivello, Spaccio Giannoni, and Torraccia. The region had a population of 3,617 inhabitants in 2025, which makes it the fourth most populous subdivision of the country.

=== Climate ===
Domagnano has a humid subtropical climate (Köppen: Cfa).

Climate data for Domagnano
Month	Jan	Feb	Mar	Apr	May	Jun	Jul	Aug	Sep	Oct	Nov	Dec	Year
Mean daily maximum °C (°F)	8.7 (47.7)	10.0 (50.0)	13.0 (55.4)	16.4 (61.5)	21.0 (69.8)	25.9 (78.6)	28.5 (83.3)	28.2 (82.8)	23.6 (74.5)	19.2 (66.6)	14.0 (57.2)	9.9 (49.8)	18.2 (64.8)
Daily mean °C (°F)	6.0 (42.8)	6.9 (44.4)	9.8 (49.6)	13.1 (55.6)	17.7 (63.9)	22.4 (72.3)	24.9 (76.8)	24.4 (75.9)	20.1 (68.2)	16.0 (60.8)	11.3 (52.3)	7.3 (45.1)	15.0 (59.0)
Mean daily minimum °C (°F)	3.7 (38.7)	4.2 (39.6)	6.7 (44.1)	9.8 (49.6)	14.2 (57.6)	18.6 (65.5)	20.9 (69.6)	20.7 (69.3)	16.8 (62.2)	13.2 (55.8)	9.0 (48.2)	5.0 (41.0)	11.9 (53.4)
Average precipitation mm (inches)	57.1 (2.25)	65.9 (2.59)	66.0 (2.60)	64.5 (2.54)	69.7 (2.74)	42.0 (1.65)	37.2 (1.46)	49.1 (1.93)	77.0 (3.03)	81.2 (3.20)	84.8 (3.34)	72.5 (2.85)	767 (30.18)
Source: Weather.Directory

== Trivia ==
Domagnano serves the headquarters for the left-wing RETE Movement.
