= SP La Fiorita =

Sanmarinese football club

La Fiorita
- Full name: Società Polisportiva La Fiorita
- Founded: 1967; 59 years ago
- Ground: Stadio Igor Crescentini
- Capacity: 500
- Chairman: Alan Gasperoni
- Head coach: Andy Selva
- League: Campionato Sammarinese di Calcio
- 2025–26: Campionato Sammarinese di Calcio, 4th of 16
- Website: https://www.lafiorita.sm/

Società Polisportiva La Fiorita is a Sammarinese multi-sports club, best known for its football section, based in Montegiardino. The club was founded in 1967. Fiorita currently plays in Girone A of Campionato Sammarinese di Calcio. The team's colours are blue, yellow and white.

== Honours ==
League

- Campionato Sammarinese di Calcio
  - Winners (6): 1986–87, 1989–90, 2013–14, 2016–17, 2017–18, 2021–22
  - Runners-up (7): 1988–89, 1993–94, 1994–95, 1996–97, 2020–21, 2023–24, 2024–25

Cup

- Coppa Titano
  - Winners (8): 1985–86, 2011–12, 2012–13, 2015–16, 2017–18, 2020–21, 2023–24, 2025–26
  - Runners-up (2): 1987–88, 1988–89
- Trofeo Federale
  - Winners (3): 1986, 1987, 2007
  - Runners-up (1): 1996
- Super Coppa Sammarinese
  - Winners (3): 2012, 2018, 2021
  - Runners-up (7): 2013, 2014, 2016, 2017, 2022, 2024, 2026

== European record ==
On 4 July 2017, they earned their first draw in European Competition by drawing with Linfield from Northern Ireland.

On 21 June 2022, they scored their first goal in the UEFA Champions League in a match against Inter Club d'Escaldes from Andorra.

On 18 July 2024, they earned their first win in European Competition by beating Isloch Minsk Raion from Belarus.

=== Matches ===
Season	Competition	Round	Club	Home	Away	Aggregate
2012–13	UEFA Europa League	1Q	(Latvia) Liepājas Metalurgs	0–2	0–4	0–6
2013–14	UEFA Europa League	1Q	(Malta) Valletta	0–3	0–1	0–4
2014–15	UEFA Champions League	1Q	(Estonia) Levadia Tallinn	0–1	0–7	0–8
2015–16	UEFA Europa League	1Q	(Liechtenstein) FC Vaduz	0–5	1–5	1–10
2016–17	UEFA Europa League	1Q	(Hungary) Debrecen	0–5	0–2	0–7
2017–18	UEFA Champions League	1Q	(Northern Ireland) Linfield	0–0	0–1	0–1
2018–19	UEFA Champions League	PR	(Gibraltar) Lincoln Red Imps	0–2		
2018–19	UEFA Europa League	2Q	(Latvia) Spartaks Jūrmala	0–3	0−6	0–9
2019–20	UEFA Europa League	PR	(Andorra) Engordany	0−1	1−2	1–3
2020–21	UEFA Europa League	PR	(Northern Ireland) Coleraine	0–1		
2021–22	UEFA Europa Conference League	1Q	(Malta) Birkirkara	1−1	0−1	1−2
2022–23	UEFA Champions League	PR	(Andorra) Inter Club d'Escaldes	1–2		
2022–23	UEFA Europa Conference League	2Q	(Kosovo) Ballkani	0–4	0–6	0–10
2023–24	UEFA Europa Conference League	1Q	(Moldova) Zimbru Chișinău	1–1	0–1	1–2
2024–25	UEFA Conference League	1Q	(Belarus) Isloch Minsk Raion	0–1	1–0 (a.e.t.)	1–1 (4–2 p)
2024–25	UEFA Conference League	2Q	(Turkey) İstanbul Başakşehir	0–4	1–6	1–10
2025–26	UEFA Conference League	1Q	(North Macedonia) Vardar	2–2	0–3	2–5
2026–27	UEFA Conference League	1Q	(Luxembourg) UNA Strassen	0–2	0–1	0–3

Notes

- PR: Preliminary round
- 1Q: First qualifying round
- 2Q: Second qualifying round

== Current squad ==
As of 15 July 2026. Note: Flags indicate national team as defined under FIFA eligibility rules; some limited exceptions apply. Players may hold more than one non-FIFA nationality.

No.	Pos.	Nation	Player
1	GK	SMR	Davide Colonna
3	DF	ITA	Andrea Brighi
4	MF	ITA	Ali Molossi
5	DF	ITA	Marco Mazzotti
7	DF	ITA	Valerio Nava
8	MF	SMR	Marcello Mularoni
9	FW	SMR	Nicolas Giacopetti
10	FW	ITA	Umberto Nappello
11	MF	SMR	Thomas Bonifazi
17	MF	ITA	Marco Djuric
18	DF	ITA	Mirko Drudi
19	FW	SMR	Samuel Pancotti

No.	Pos.	Nation	Player
20	MF	BRA	Daniel Cicarelli
21	FW	ITA	Riccardo Zulli
22	DF	ARG	Hernán Zazas
23	DF	ITA	Andrea Grandoni
26	DF	ITA	Antonio Barretta
27	GK	ITA	Gianluca Vivan (captain)
28	DF	ITA	Giacomo Nigretti
33	MF	SMR	Tommaso Zafferani
71	GK	SMR	Alan Neri
77	FW	ITA	Matthias Bonetti
90	FW	ITA	Tommaso Guidi
99	FW	SMR	Filippo Berardi
