= Fiorentino =

Castello of San Marino

Fiorentino Fiurentêin (Romagnol)
- Castello
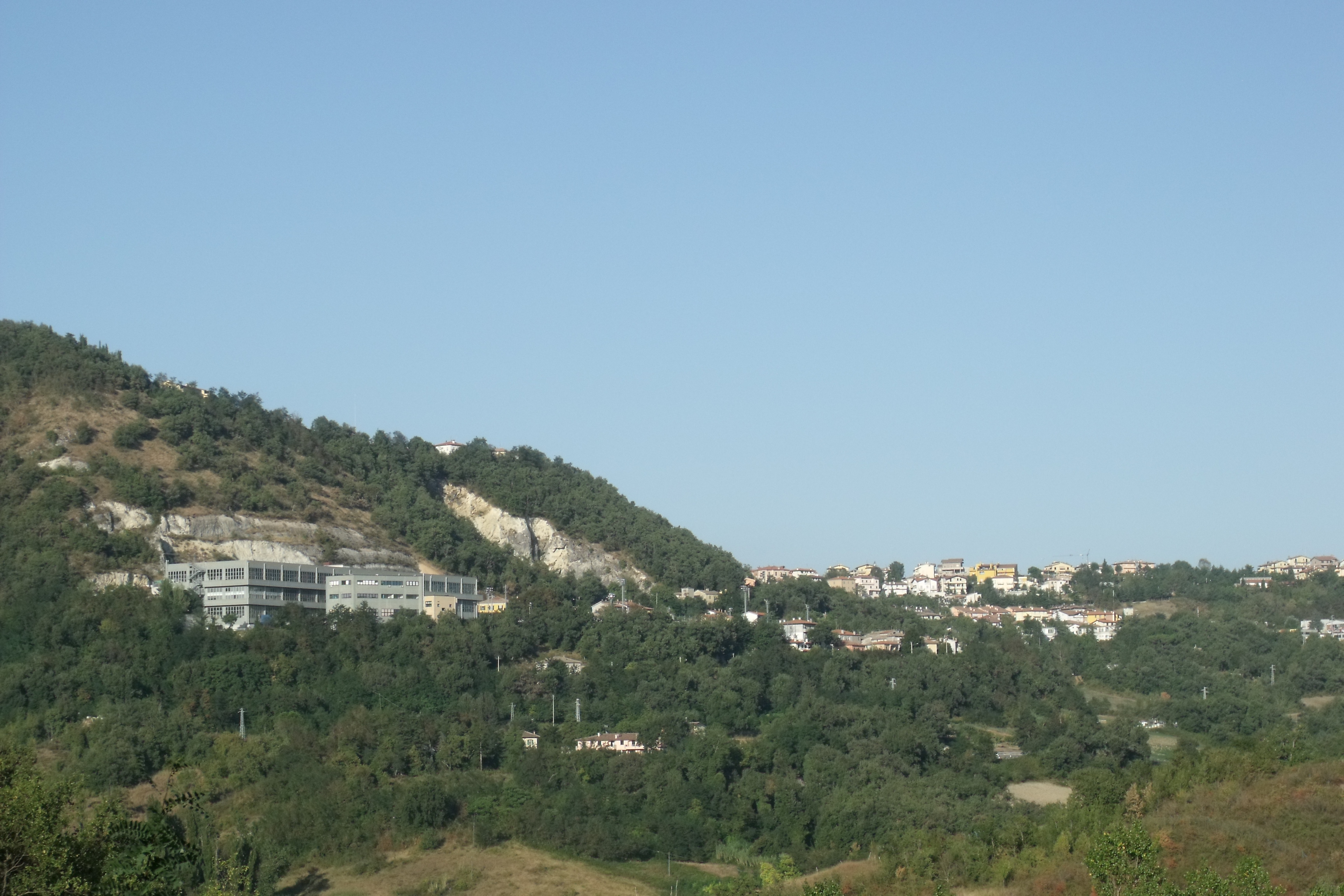
- Panorama of Fiorentino

- Flag Coat of arms

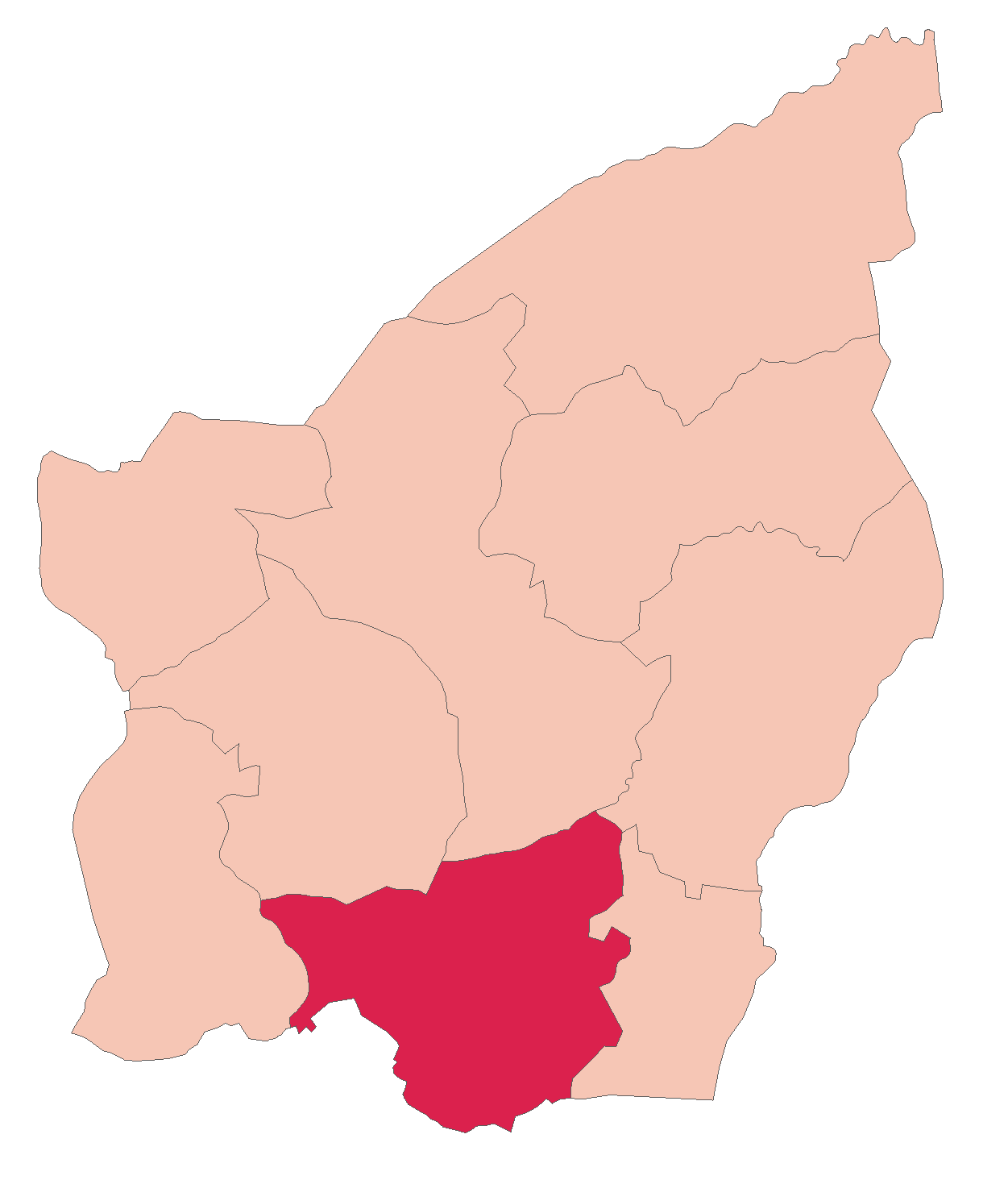
- Location of Fiorentino in San Marino

- Location within San Marino
- Coordinates: 43°54′38″N 12°27′20″E
- Country: San Marino
- Curazie: List: Capanne, Crociale, Pianacci

Government
  - Capitano: Claudio Mancini (Fiorentino Viva; since 2020)

Area
  - Total: 6.56 km^{2} (2.53 sq mi)
- Elevation: 490 m (1,610 ft)

Population (January 2025)
  - Total: 2,607
  - Density: 397/km^{2} (1,030/sq mi)
- Time zone: UTC+1 (CET)
  - Summer (DST): CEST
- Postal code: 47897
- Climate: Cfb
- Website: gov.sm

Fiorentino (Romagnol: Fiurentêin) is one of the nine castelli of San Marino. It occupies an area of 6.56 km^{2} (2.53 sq mi) and is the fourth smallest castello in the country by land area. As of 2023, it had a population of 2,615 inhabitants.

== History ==
The territory of San Marino consisted only of Mount Titano until 1463. The nation became part of an alliance against Sigismondo Pandolfo Malatesta, the Lord of Rimini, who was defeated. The Pope Pius II gifted the towns of Fiorentino, Montegiardino, and Serravalle to San Marino as a reward for being part of the alliance. Later, Faetano voluntarily joined the country, and the boundaries have remained the same ever since. Once the war was over, the people of San Marino razed the castle of Fiorentino to prevent it from falling into enemy hands in the future, and the castle remains in ruins atop Mount Seghizo. Apart from the main castle, there were other towers and castles and region, because of which Fiorentino is also called the "Land of Castles". The Tower of Torricella was located on Monte San Cristoforo and was demolished in 1465 while the Pennarossa Castle was located on Mount Moganzio, of which remain the foundations and cisterns remain. The coat of arms of Fiorentino consists of three red roses on a yellow shield.

== Geography ==
The country of San Marino is divided into nine municipalities (castelli) for administration. With a land area of 6.56 km^{2} (2.53 sq mi), Fiorentino is the fourth smallest castello in the country by area. The region had a population of 2,615 inhabitants in September 2023, which slightly decreased to 2,607 in January 2025. It borders the San Marino municipalities Chiesanuova, San Marino, Borgo Maggiore, Faetano, and Montegiardino and the Italian municipalities Monte Grimano and Sassofeltrio.

Fiorentino is sub-divided into three curazia amongst the 44 secondary sub-divisions of the country. These include Capanne, Crociale, and Pianacci. Fiorentino is one of the most urbanized castillo with businesses and upscale housing. The Federico Crescentini sports field, the country's second largest sports facility, is located in the region. It is also home to the soccer clubs S.P. Tre Fiori and F.C. Fiorentino.

=== Climate ===
Fiorentino has a humid subtropical climate (Köppen: Cfa).

Climate data for Fiorentino
Month	Jan	Feb	Mar	Apr	May	Jun	Jul	Aug	Sep	Oct	Nov	Dec	Year
Mean daily maximum °C (°F)	8.7 (47.7)	10.0 (50.0)	13.0 (55.4)	16.4 (61.5)	21.0 (69.8)	25.9 (78.6)	28.5 (83.3)	28.2 (82.8)	23.6 (74.5)	19.2 (66.6)	14.0 (57.2)	9.9 (49.8)	18.2 (64.8)
Daily mean °C (°F)	6.0 (42.8)	6.9 (44.4)	9.8 (49.6)	13.1 (55.6)	17.7 (63.9)	22.4 (72.3)	24.9 (76.8)	24.4 (75.9)	20.1 (68.2)	16.0 (60.8)	11.3 (52.3)	7.3 (45.1)	15.0 (59.0)
Mean daily minimum °C (°F)	3.7 (38.7)	4.2 (39.6)	6.7 (44.1)	9.8 (49.6)	14.2 (57.6)	18.6 (65.5)	20.9 (69.6)	20.7 (69.3)	16.8 (62.2)	13.2 (55.8)	9.0 (48.2)	5.0 (41.0)	11.9 (53.4)
Average precipitation mm (inches)	57.1 (2.25)	65.9 (2.59)	66.0 (2.60)	64.5 (2.54)	69.7 (2.74)	42.0 (1.65)	37.2 (1.46)	49.1 (1.93)	77.0 (3.03)	81.2 (3.20)	84.8 (3.34)	72.5 (2.85)	767 (30.18)
Source: Weather.Directory
