= SP Tre Penne =

San Marino football club

Tre Penne
- Full name: Società Polisportiva Tre Penne
- Founded: 1956; 70 years ago
- Ground: Stadio Fonte dell'Ovo, City of San Marino, San Marino
- Capacity: 1,000
- Chairman: Fabrizio Selva
- Manager: Nicola Berardi
- League: Campionato Sammarinese di Calcio
- 2025–26: Campionato Sammarinese di Calcio, 3rd of 16
- Website: http://www.trepenne.com
| Home colours | Away colours |

S.P. Tre Penne is a multi-sports club based in the City of San Marino. It is best known for their football section. Literally meaning the "Three Feathers", the club was founded in 1956, and currently plays in Campionato Sammarinese di Calcio. The team colors are blue and white when home, and red when away.

On 9 July 2013, Tre Penne became the first Sammarinese team to win a game in a European competition by defeating Shirak 1–0 in the second leg of their 2013–14 UEFA Champions League first qualifying round contest.

== Honours ==
- Campionato Sammarinese di Calcio: 5

2011–12, 2012–13, 2015–16, 2018–19, 2022–23

- Coppa Titano: 6

1966–67, 1969–70, 1981–82, 1982–83, 1999–2000, 2016–17

- San Marino Federal Trophy: 1

2005

- Super Coppa Sammarinese: 3

2013, 2016, 2017

== History ==
Two months after the A.C. Libertas on 11 November 1928, the team was established at the behest of the Segretario Sammarinese Fascist Party, Manlio Gozi. By the 1930s, the U.S. Sammarinese Titania was buying purely organizational characteristics; the birth of the first concept of the national associations, and promotion of the formation of Titania 4 Youth Sports Groups. On 21 August 1933, in the capital, La Serenissima was formed and Marina Belluzzi was appointed as chairman. La Serenissima was the team that represented the capital of San Marino in the first edition of the Titan Cup in 1937. The colours were already white and blue following tradition inherited from Tre Penne. The onset was initially a win 2–0 in La Castellana di Serravalle, but the final of the Cup saw them take third place. La Serenissima reformed after the war. In 1952, they started a Titan Cup.

In 1956, at the behest of a group of sportsmen of the Castle, San Marino regained its representative football status in Tre Penne; which took its name from the three peaks of Monte Titano and the colours of the Serenissima (black and white). Curiously, even Tre Penne became a sort of representative Sammarinese. In 1959, Italy gained recognition by the Regional Committee of Bologna FIGC, and then Tre Penne joined forces with Libertas. Born Libertas Tre Penne, it was chaired by the Director of the Government of Tourism, Gian Vito Marcucci, who kept the colours of the Tre Penne. Speakers from the ashes of the Federation and Libertas, Tre Penne was moulded into the sports Serenissima, today San Marino Calcio. The first success for Tre Penne still comes in the form of Representative of San Marino in 1966 when it participated in Bergonzona (Switzerland) Amateurs in the Tournament of small states. To the surprise of trainers, Sammarienese proceeded to the final and almost went unbeaten, but they ultimately lost against Austria. In 1967 they won their first Titan Cup. Tre Penne took its first steps by introducing Marco Macina, the first player to wear the jersey of San Marino as an extra-national Italian Under-16 Championship in 1982, to their team. They became the European champions in the categories, but then mill already in the ranks of militant youth of Bologna.

In the 2009-10 season, Tre Penne qualified for their first European tournament after losing in the finals of the Campionato Sammarinese playoff against Tre Fiori. The club also qualified for the Champions League for the first time in 2012 and lost to F91 Dudelange. As a result, the team received €340,000 and the money was used to improve facilities and invest in youth development. The club registered their first win in European competitions on July 9, 2013, and won the Champions league as they beat Shirak by a scoreline of 1–0, thanks in no small part to the efforts of goalkeeper Federico Valentini.

== European record ==
| Season | Competition | Round | Club | Home | Away | Agg. |
|---|---|---|---|---|---|---|
| 2010-11 | 2010-11 UEFA Europa League | 2QR | (Bosnia and Herzegovina) Zrinjski Mostar | 2–9 | 1–4 | 3–13 |
| 2011-12 | 2011-12 UEFA Europa League | 1QR | (Serbia) Rad | 1–3 | 0–6 | 1–9 |
| 2012-13 | 2012-13 UEFA Champions League | 1QR | (Luxembourg) F91 Dudelange | 0–4 | 0–7 | 0–11 |
| 2013-14 | 2013-14 UEFA Champions League | 1QR | (Armenia) Shirak | 1–0 | 0–3 | 1–3 |
| 2016-17 | 2016-17 UEFA Champions League | 1QR | (Wales) The New Saints | 0–3 | 1–2 | 1–5 |
| 2017-18 | 2017–18 UEFA Europa League | 1QR | (North Macedonia) Rabotnichki | 0–1 | 0–6 | 0–7 |
| 2019-20 | 2019–20 UEFA Champions League | PR | (Andorra) FC Santa Coloma | 0–1 | | |
| 2019-20 | 2019–20 UEFA Europa League | 2QR | (Lithuania) Sūduva | 0–5 | 0–5 | 0–10 |
| 2020-21 | 2020–21 UEFA Europa League | PR | (Kosovo) Gjilani | 1–3 | | |
| 2021-22 | 2021–22 UEFA Europa Conference League | 1QR | (Georgia (country)) Dinamo Batumi | 0–4 | 0–3 | 0–7 |
| 2022-23 | 2022–23 UEFA Europa Conference League | 1QR | (Bosnia and Herzegovina) Tuzla City | 0–2 | 0–6 | 0–8 |
| 2023-24 | 2023–24 UEFA Champions League | PR | (Iceland) Breiðablik | 1–7 | | |
| 2023-24 | 2023–24 UEFA Conference League | 2QR | (Latvia) Valmiera | 0–3 | 0–7 | 0–10 |
| 2024-25 | 2024–25 UEFA Conference League | 1QR | (Malta) Floriana | 1–1 | 1–3 | 2–4 |

== Current squad ==
As of 6 April, 2026.

Note: Flags indicate national team as defined under FIFA eligibility rules; some limited exceptions apply. Players may hold more than one non-FIFA nationality.

| No. | Pos. | Nation | Player |
|---|---|---|---|
| 2 | DF | SMR | Alessandro D'Addario |
| 3 | DF | COL | Sebastián Mosquera |
| 5 | DF | ITA | Manuel Ferrani |
| 6 | DF | ITA | Angelo Gregorio |
| 7 | MF | ITA | Lorenzo Pastorelli |
| 8 | MF | ITA | Simone Loiodice (Captain) |
| 9 | FW | ITA | Riccardo Pieri |
| 10 | FW | ITA | Lucio Peluso |
| 11 | FW | SMR | Filippo Berardi |
| 18 | FW | SEN | Maurice Kamouni |
| 20 | MF | ITA | Simone Errico |

| No. | Pos. | Nation | Player |
|---|---|---|---|
| 23 | MF | ITA | Filippo Fabbri |
| 26 | GK | ITA | Mattia Migani |
| 27 | MF | ITA | Gianluca Turchetta |
| 28 | DF | ITA | Giacomo Nigretti |
| 31 | MF | ITA | Patrick Casadio |
| 36 | GK | SMR | Mattia Cervellini |
| 57 | MF | SMR | Giacomo Zafferani |
| 77 | MF | ITA | Tommaso Bartoli |
| 80 | DF | SMR | Mirko Palazzi |
| 85 | GK | ITA | Michael Munari |
| 95 | FW | ITA | Imre Badalassi |

=== Out on loan ===
Note: Flags indicate national team as defined under FIFA eligibility rules; some limited exceptions apply. Players may hold more than one non-FIFA nationality.

| No. | Pos. | Nation | Player |

== Former players ==
- (Russia) Vladimir Mikhaylovskiy
- (Brazil) Maicon
- (Argentina) Lucas Correa

== Managers ==
- (Italy) Stefano Ceci (2010–12)
- (San Marino) Morris Tamburini (2013–17)
- (Italy) Luigi Bizzotto (2017–18)
- (Italy) Stefano Ceci (2018–24)
- (San Marino) Nicola Berardi (2024–)
