= Davide Simoncini =

Sammarinese footballer (born 1986)

Personal information
- Date of birth: 30 August 1986 (age 40)
- Place of birth: San Marino
- Height: 1.95 m (6 ft 5 in)
- Position: Defender

Team information
- Current team: Monte Grimano Terme

Senior career*
| Years | Team | Apps | (Gls) |
| 2005–2006 | A.C. Libertas | | |
| 2006 | Valleverde Riccione | | |
| 2007 | Santa Giustina | | |
| 2007–2008 | Torcona Calcio | | |
| 2008–2009 | Santa Giustina | | |
| 2009–2020 | A.C. Libertas | 165 | (12) |
| 2020–2023 | Tre Fiori | 30 | (1) |
| 2023–2025 | Fiorentino | 47 | (2) |
| 2025 | Murata | 12 | (0) |
| 2026– | Monte Grimano Terme | | |

International career^{‡}
| 2006–2021 | San Marino | 69 | (0) |
- * Club domestic league appearances and goals as of 5 June 2026 ‡ National team caps and goals as of 12 October 2021

Davide Simoncini (born 30 August 1986) is a Sammarinese footballer who plays as a defender for Italian club Monte Grimano Terme.

== Club career ==
Simoncini played for A.C. Libertas from 2005 until 2020, when he signed for S.P. Tre Fiori. He has enjoyed success at both clubs, winning the Coppa Titano twice with Libertas.

== International career ==
Simoncini made his debut for San Marino in 2006 in a friendly against Albania, coming on as a substitute. He is La Serenissima's third most capped player and the most capped player still active.

Simoncini and his twin brother, Aldo, both scored an own goal each against Sweden on 7 September 2010, becoming the first twins to accomplish such a feat in an international competition.

== Career statistics ==
=== Club ===
Appearances and goals by club, season and competition
| Club | Season | League | | | National cup | | Europe | | Other | | Total | |
| Club | Season | Division | Apps | Goals | Apps | Goals | Apps | Goals | Apps | Goals | Apps | Goals |
|---|---|---|---|---|---|---|---|---|---|---|---|---|
| Libertas | 2009–10 | Campionato Sammarinese | | | | | | | | | | |
| Libertas | 2010–11 | Campionato Sammarinese | | | | | | | | | | |
| Libertas | 2011–12 | Campionato Sammarinese | | | | | | | | | | |
| Libertas | 2012–13 | Campionato Sammarinese | | | | | | | | | | |
| Libertas | 2013–14 | Campionato Sammarinese | | | | | | | | | | |
| Libertas | 2014–15 | Campionato Sammarinese | | | | | | | | | | |
| Libertas | 2015–16 | Campionato Sammarinese | | | | | | | | | | |
| Libertas | 2016–17 | Campionato Sammarinese | | | | | | | | | | |
| Libertas | 2017–18 | Campionato Sammarinese | | | | | | | | | | |
| Libertas | 2018–19 | Campionato Sammarinese | | | | | | | | | | |
| Libertas | 2019–20 | Campionato Sammarinese | | | | | | | | | | |
| Libertas | Total | | | | | | | | | | | |
| Tre Fiori | 2020–21 | Campionato Sammarinese | | | | | | | | | | |
| Tre Fiori | 2021–22 | Campionato Sammarinese | | | | | | | | | | |
| Tre Fiori | 2022–23 | Campionato Sammarinese | | | | | | | | | | |
| Tre Fiori | Total | | | | | | | | | | | |
| Fiorentino | 2023–24 | Campionato Sammarinese | | | | | | | | | | |
| Fiorentino | 2024–25 | Campionato Sammarinese | | | | | | | | | | |
| Fiorentino | Total | | | | | | | | | | | |
| Murata | 2025–26 | Campionato Sammarinese | | | | | | | | | | |
| Career total | | | | | | | | | | | | |

== Personal life ==
He is the twin brother of fellow San Marino international footballer Aldo Junior Simoncini. He works as an accountant.
