= 2015–16 Campionato Sammarinese di Calcio =

Amateur football league competition series

Campionato Sammarinese di Calcio
- Season: 2015–16
- Champions: Tre Penne (3rd title)
- Champions League: Tre Penne
- Europa League: La Fiorita; Folgore
- Matches: 164
- Goals: 515 (3.14 per match)

The 2015–16 Campionato Sammarinese di Calcio season was the thirty-first since its establishment. It is the highest level in San Marino, in which the country's top 15 amateur football clubs play. The season began on 11 September 2015 and ended with the play-off final on 26 May 2016. Folgore/Falciano were the defending champions.

== Participating teams ==
Because there is no promotion or relegation in the league, the same 15 teams who competed in the league last season competed in the league this season.

- S.P. Cailungo (Borgo Maggiore)
- S.S. Cosmos (Serravalle)
- F.C. Domagnano (Domagnano)
- S.C. Faetano (Faetano)
- F.C. Fiorentino (Fiorentino)
- S.S. Folgore/Falciano (Serravalle)
- A.C. Juvenes/Dogana (Serravalle)
- S.P. La Fiorita (Montegiardino)
- A.C. Libertas (Borgo Maggiore)
- S.S. Murata (San Marino)
- S.S. Pennarossa (Chiesanuova)
- S.S. San Giovanni (Borgo Maggiore)
- S.P. Tre Fiori (Fiorentino)
- S.P. Tre Penne (Serravalle)
- S.S. Virtus (Acquaviva)

== Regular season ==
The 15 clubs were split into two groups; one with eight clubs and another with seven clubs.

=== Group A ===
| Pos | Team | Pld | W | D | L | GF | GA | GD | Pts | Qualification |
|---|---|---|---|---|---|---|---|---|---|---|
| 1 | La Fiorita | 21 | 13 | 2 | 6 | 56 | 25 | +31 | 41 | Qualification for the championship play–offs and Europa League first qualifying round |
| 2 | Pennarossa | 21 | 9 | 8 | 4 | 32 | 20 | +12 | 35 | Qualification for the championship play–offs |
| 3 | Juvenes/Dogana | 21 | 9 | 4 | 8 | 34 | 27 | +7 | 31 | Qualification for the championship play–offs |
| 4 | Libertas | 21 | 7 | 6 | 8 | 23 | 26 | −3 | 27 | |
| 5 | Cosmos | 21 | 3 | 8 | 10 | 25 | 37 | −12 | 17 | |
| 6 | Cailungo | 21 | 4 | 4 | 13 | 19 | 50 | −31 | 16 | |
| 7 | Faetano | 21 | 3 | 6 | 12 | 18 | 35 | −17 | 15 | |
| 8 | San Giovanni | 21 | 1 | 3 | 17 | 13 | 63 | −50 | 6 | |

Source: UEFA
Rules for classification: 1) Points; 2) Head-to-head points; 3) Head-to-head goal difference; 4) Head-to-head goals scored; 5) Goal difference; 6) Goals scored.

=== Group B ===
| Pos | Team | Pld | W | D | L | GF | GA | GD | Pts | Qualification |
|---|---|---|---|---|---|---|---|---|---|---|
| 1 | Tre Penne (C, O) | 20 | 15 | 3 | 2 | 50 | 14 | +36 | 48 | Qualification for the championship play–offs |
| 2 | Tre Fiori | 20 | 13 | 1 | 6 | 37 | 27 | +10 | 40 | Qualification for the championship play–offs |
| 3 | Folgore | 20 | 12 | 3 | 5 | 44 | 25 | +19 | 39 | Qualification for the championship play–offs |
| 4 | Fiorentino | 20 | 11 | 2 | 7 | 30 | 24 | +6 | 35 | |
| 5 | Domagnano | 20 | 9 | 3 | 8 | 33 | 32 | +1 | 30 | |
| 6 | Virtus | 20 | 8 | 4 | 8 | 37 | 36 | +1 | 28 | |
| 7 | Murata | 20 | 7 | 3 | 10 | 35 | 45 | −10 | 24 | |

Source: UEFA
Rules for classification: 1) Points; 2) Head-to-Head points; 3) Head-to-Head goal difference; 4) Head-to-Head goals scored; 5) Goal difference; 6) Goals scored.
(C) Champions; (O) Play-off winners

== Results ==
All teams played twice against the teams within their own group and once against the teams from the other group. This meant that the clubs in the eight-club group played 21 matches each while the clubs in the seven-club group played 20 matches each during the regular season.

| Home \ Away | CAI | COS | DOM | FAE | FIO | FOL | J/D | LFI | LIB | MUR | PEN | SGI | TFI | TPE | VIR |
|---|---|---|---|---|---|---|---|---|---|---|---|---|---|---|---|
| Cailungo | | 2–1 | | 1–1 | | 1–5 | 0–3 | 0–6 | 0–4 | | 0–3 | 0–1 | 4–1 | 1–2 | 1–4 |
| Cosmos | 1–2 | | 3–1 | 1–2 | 0–0 | 1–2 | 2–2 | 1–3 | 0–0 | 1–1 | 1–1 | 3–1 | 1–3 | | 1–2 |
| Domagnano | 3–0 | | | 1–0 | 0–1 | 0–2 | | | 1–1 | 2–1 | | | 2–4 | 2–3 | 2–0 |
| Faetano | 2–1 | 0–0 | | | | | 0–1 | 0–0 | 0–1 | 0–2 | 0–1 | 1–1 | | | 2–4 |
| Fiorentino | 2–0 | | 1–2 | 2–2 | | 2–1 | | 2–1 | 1–0 | 3–1 | 0–1 | | 3–1 | 0–3 | 3–0 |
| Folgore | | | 1–2 | 3–1 | 3–0 | | 3–2 | | | 2–1 | | 4–1 | 1–2 | 0–1 | 3–2 |
| Juvenes/Dogana | 2–0 | 2–2 | 2–2 | 3–1 | 0–2 | | | 0–2 | 2–1 | | 0–1 | 2–0 | | | |
| La Fiorita | 5–0 | 5–0 | 4–2 | 4–1 | | 1–1 | 3–2 | | 4–0 | | 1–0 | 5–0 | 2–0 | 0–3 | |
| Libertas | 1–1 | 2–1 | | 2–0 | | 0–4 | 2–1 | 2–1 | | 1–2 | 0–1 | 1–1 | | 0–3 | 1–1 |
| Murata | 3–5 | | 0–2 | | 1–3 | 3–3 | 2–1 | 3–1 | | | 2–2 | | 0–4 | 1–4 | 2–5 |
| Pennarossa | 0–0 | 3–1 | 2–2 | 3–3 | | 1–2 | 0–1 | 2–1 | 1–1 | | | 4–0 | 0–2 | | 0–0 |
| San Giovanni | 0–0 | 1–2 | 2–5 | 0–1 | 1–3 | | 0–4 | 2–4 | 0–3 | 0–4 | 1–4 | | | 0–6 | |
| Tre Fiori | | | 2–0 | 2–1 | 1–0 | 1–3 | 1–2 | | 1–0 | 4–1 | | 3–1 | | 0–4 | 2–2 |
| Tre Penne | | 2–2 | 2–0 | 2–0 | 3–0 | 2–0 | 1–1 | | | 1–3 | 1–1 | | 0–1 | | 3–1 |
| Virtus | | | 1–2 | | 3–2 | 1–1 | 2–1 | 4–3 | | 0–1 | | 4–0 | 0–2 | 1–4 | |

Source: UEFA
Legend: Blue = home team win; Yellow = draw; Red = away team win.

== Play-offs ==
The top three teams from each group advanced to a play-off which determined the season's champion and qualifiers for the 2016–17 UEFA Champions League and the 2016–17 UEFA Europa League.

The play-offs were played in a double-eliminination format with both group winners earning byes in the first and second round. All matches were decided over one leg with extra time and then penalties used to break ties.

The schedule was announced on 21 April 2016.

=== Bracket ===
Upper round 1 | Upper round 2 | Upper final | Final
Match 5 – 10 May
La Fiorita | 1
Tre Penne | 2 | Match 7 – 16 May
Match 1 – 4 May
Tre Penne | 1 (3)
Tre Fiori | 1
Match 3 – 7 May | Folgore | 1 (0)
Juvenes/Dogana | 0
Tre Fiori | 2
Match 2 – 4 May
Folgore | 3
Pennarossa | 0 | Match 10 – 26 May
Folgore | 3 | Tre Penne | 3
La Fiorita | 1
Lower round 1 | Lower round 2 | Lower round 3 | Lower final
Match 9 – 21 May
Match 8 – 17 May | La Fiorita | 2
Match 6 – 13 May | Juvenes/Dogana | 0 | Folgore | 1
Match 4 – 9 May | Juvenes/Dogana | 1 | La Fiorita | 3
Juvenes/Dogana | 2 (7) | Tre Fiori | 0
Pennarossa | 2 (6)

=== Round 1 ===
Upper

4 May 2016
21:00

| Tre Fiori | 1–0 | Juvenes/Dogana |
|---|---|---|
| Ferri 74' | Report |

Campo sportivo di Fiorentino, Fiorentino
Referee: Cristiano Ascari

4 May 2016
21:00

| Pennarossa | 0–3 | Folgore |
|---|---|---|
| | Report | Rossi 14'; Genestreti 30'; Valeriani 90+1' |

Campo sportivo di Fonte dell'Ovo, San Marino
Referee: Krisztina Szeles

Lower

9 May 2016
21:00

| Juvenes/Dogana | 2–2 (a.e.t.) | Pennarossa |
|---|---|---|
| Santini 49'; Villa 118' | Report | Giunchi 27'; Gualtieri 104' |
Penalties
| | 7–6 |

Campo sportivo di Fonte dell'Ovo, San Marino
Referee: Leonardo Guidi

Pennarossa eliminated.

=== Round 2 ===
Upper

7 May 2016
21:00

| Tre Fiori | 2–3 | Folgore |
|---|---|---|
| Ferri 24', 90' | Report | Rossi 20'; Perrotta 42'; Genestreti 90+3' |

Campo sportivo di Fiorentino, Fiorentino
Referee: Luis Do Nascimento

10 May 2016
21:00

| La Fiorita | 1–2 | Tre Penne |
|---|---|---|
| Guidi 85' | Report | Fraternali 24' (o.g.); Rispoli 39' |

Campo sportivo di Fonte dell'Ovo, San Marino
Referee: Michele Cruciani

Lower

13 May 2016
21:00

| Juvenes/Dogana | 1–0 | Tre Fiori |
|---|---|---|
| Santini 76' | Report |

Campo sportivo di Fonte dell'Ovo, San Marino
Referee: Johnni Casanova

Tre Fiori eliminated.

=== Round 3 ===
Upper final

16 May 2016
21:00

| Tre Penne | 1–1 (a.e.t.) | Folgore |
|---|---|---|
| Gai 71' | Report | Rossi 8' |
Penalties
| | 3–0 |

Campo sportivo di Fonte dell'Ovo, San Marino
Referee: Michele Scarpino

Lower

17 May 2016
21:00

| Juvenes/Dogana | 0–3 | La Fiorita |
|---|---|---|
| | Report | Zafferani 37'; Martini 60'; Rinaldi 85' |

Campo sportivo di Fonte dell'Ovo, San Marino
Referee: Daniele D’Adamo

Juvenes/Dogana eliminated.

=== Lower final ===
21 May 2016
21:00

| La Fiorita | 2–1 | Folgore |
|---|---|---|
| Selva 7'; Zafferani 69' | Report | Valeriani 10' |

Campo sportivo di Fonte dell'Ovo, San Marino
Referee: Marco Avoni

Folgore eliminated and qualified for 2016–17 Europa League first qualifying round^{†}.

=== Final ===
26 May 2016
21:00

| Tre Penne | 3–1 | La Fiorita |
|---|---|---|
| Rispoli 8' (pen.); Palazzi 34'; Gai 90+4' | Report | Zafferani 12' |

San Marino Stadium, Serravalle
Referee: Luca Barbeno

Tre Penne qualified for 2016–17 Champions League first qualifying round and La Fiorita qualified for 2016–17 Europa League first qualifying round^{†}.
^{†}Since La Fiorita had already qualified for the Europa League first qualifying round by winning the 2015–16 Coppa Titano, their European berth (Europa League first qualifying round) for being league runners-up passed to the next highest placed team not already qualified.
