= 2014–15 Campionato Sammarinese di Calcio =

Campionato Sammarinese di Calcio
- Season: 2014–15
- Champions: Folgore
- Champions League: Folgore
- Europa League: Juvenes/Dogana; La Fiorita
- Matches: 164
- Goals: 451 (2.75 per match)
- Top goalscorer: Daniele Frigugliette (16 goals)
- Biggest home win: Tre Fiori 5–0 Virtus
- Biggest away win: San Giovanni 0–6 Juvenes/Dogana
- Highest scoring: Faetano 3–5 Tre Fiori (aet)
- All statistics correct as of 26 May 2015.

The 2014–15 Campionato Sammarinese di Calcio season was the thirtieth since its establishment. It is the highest level in San Marino, in which the country's top 15 amateur football clubs play. The season began on 12 September 2014 and ended with the play-off final on 26 May 2015.

== Participating teams ==
Because there is no promotion or relegation in the league, the same 15 teams who competed in the league last season will compete in the league this season.

- S.P. Cailungo (Borgo Maggiore)
- S.S. Cosmos (Serravalle)
- F.C. Domagnano (Domagnano)
- S.C. Faetano (Faetano)
- F.C. Fiorentino (Fiorentino)
- S.S. Folgore/Falciano (Serravalle)
- A.C. Juvenes/Dogana (Serravalle)
- S.P. La Fiorita (Montegiardino)
- A.C. Libertas (Borgo Maggiore)
- S.S. Murata (San Marino)
- S.S. Pennarossa (Chiesanuova)
- S.S. San Giovanni (Borgo Maggiore)
- S.P. Tre Fiori (Fiorentino)
- S.P. Tre Penne (Serravalle)
- S.S. Virtus (Acquaviva)

== Regular season ==
The 15 clubs are split into two groups; one with eight clubs and another with seven clubs.

=== Group A ===
Pos	Team	Pld	W	D	L	GF	GA	GD	Pts	Qualification
1	Juvenes/Dogana	20	12	4	4	35	15	+20	40	Qualification for the championship play–offs
2	Tre Fiori	20	12	2	6	36	17	+19	38	Qualification for the championship play–offs
3	Faetano	20	9	5	6	26	21	+5	32	Qualification for the championship play–offs
4	Cailungo	20	8	4	8	28	29	−1	28	
5	Virtus	20	8	4	8	27	28	−1	28	
6	Murata	20	5	5	10	26	34	−8	20	
7	Cosmos	20	0	5	15	13	48	−35	5	

Rules for classification: 1) points; 2) goal difference; 3) number of goals scored.

=== Group B ===
Pos	Team	Pld	W	D	L	GF	GA	GD	Pts	Qualification
1	Folgore	21	13	5	3	41	19	+22	44	Qualification for the championship play–offs
2	La Fiorita	21	11	5	5	37	25	+12	38	Qualification for the championship play–offs
3	Domagnano	21	11	3	7	28	23	+5	36	Qualification for the championship play–offs
4	Libertas	21	8	8	5	23	16	+7	32	
5	Fiorentino	21	9	5	7	24	22	+2	32	
6	Pennarossa	21	9	3	9	33	26	+7	30	
7	Tre Penne	21	5	3	13	24	43	−19	18	
8	San Giovanni	21	2	3	16	21	56	−35	9	

Rules for classification: 1) points; 2) goal difference; 3) number of goals scored.

== Results ==
All teams played twice against the teams within their own group and once against the teams from the other group. This means that the clubs in the eight-club group played 21 matches each while the clubs in the seven-club group played 20 matches each during the regular season.

Home \ Away	CAI	COS	DOM	FAE	FIO	FOL	J/D	LFI	LIB	MUR	PEN	SGI	TFI	TPE	VIR
Cailungo		1–1	2–1	1–2	1–1	2–0	1–1			3–0			1–0	2–1	1–4
Cosmos	0–1			1–4	0–1		0–3	1–1		1–3	0–4	1–1	0–0		2–3
Domagnano		3–0			1–0	1–3	0–1	0–1	0–0		2–1	3–2	1–0	1–1	1–1
Faetano	3–1	1–1	2–0		1–1		1–0			0–2		1–2	2–1		1–2
Fiorentino			1–2			3–2	1–2	0–2	0–0		2–1	2–1		1–0	1–0
Folgore		2–0	2–1	2–0	3–1			2–2	0–0		3–1	0–0		3–1	
Juvenes/Dogana	3–0	3–2		0–0		0–2				2–2	1–1		0–1	3–1	2–1
La Fiorita	3–2		5–2	0–1	1–2	1–1	2–1		1–1	1–0	0–2	3–1		3–3	
Libertas	0–0	3–0	0–1	1–0	1–1	1–4	0–2	1–0		1–0	1–1	4–2		1–0	0–1
Murata	1–5	5–2	0–1	1–3	1–1	1–1	0–1						1–3		3–1
Pennarossa	2–0		0–1	2–3	2–1	1–0		1–2	1–1	2–1		3–1	0–1	3–1	
San Giovanni	0–1		1–2		0–2	0–4	0–6	1–4	0–4	1–1	1–3		1–3	1–3	
Tre Fiori	3–1	5–1		2–0	1–0	2–4	0–1	2–1	2–0	4–1					5–0
Tre Penne		1–0	0–4	1–1	0–2	0–1		1–3	0–3	1–3		2–5	2–1		2–1
Virtus	3–2	3–0		0–0		1–2	0–3	0–1		0–0	2–1	4–0	0–0	1–3	

Source: uefa.com
Legend: Blue = home team win; Yellow = draw; Red = away team win.

== Play-offs ==
The top three teams from each group advanced to a series of play-offs which determined the season's champion and qualifiers for the 2015–16 UEFA Champions League and the 2015–16 UEFA Europa League. The playoffs started on 4 May 2015 and concluded with the final on 26 May 2015.

=== First round ===
4 May 2015
21:00

Tre Fiori	1–0	Domagnano
Lini 55'	Report

Campo di Fiorentino, Fiorentino

4 May 2015
21:00

La Fiorita	3–1	Faetano
Petráš 15'; Selva 52', 81'	Report	Stefanelli 43'

Campo sportivo di Fonte dell'Ovo, San Marino

=== Second round ===
8 May 2015
21:00

Domagnano	0–2	Faetano
	Report	Moroni 27'; Stefanelli 70'

Campo sportivo di Fonte dell'Ovo, San Marino

Domagnano eliminated

9 May 2015
17:00

Tre Fiori	0–1	La Fiorita
	Report	Marino 66'

Campo di Fiorentino, Fiorentino

=== Third round ===
11 May 2015
21:00

Folgore	2–1	Juvenes/Dogana
Hirsch 11', 35'	Report	Maccagno 66' (pen.)

Campo sportivo di Fonte dell'Ovo, San Marino

14 May 2015
21:00

Faetano	3–5 (a.e.t.)	Tre Fiori
Moroni 7'; Valentini 61'; Cavoli 63'	Report	O'Neil 26', 38', 99'; Andreini 32'; Succi 101'

Campo sportivo di Fonte dell'Ovo, San Marino

Faetano eliminated

=== Fourth round ===
16 May 2015
17:00

Folgore	2–1 (a.e.t.)	La Fiorita
Magnani 90+1'; Della Valle 101'	Report	Rinaldi 56'

Campo sportivo di Fonte dell'Ovo, San Marino

18 May 2015
21:00

Tre Fiori	0–3	Juvenes/Dogana
	Report	Mantovani 33'; Mariotti 78' (pen.); Ugolini 90+1'

Campo sportivo di Fonte dell'Ovo, San Marino

Tre Fiori eliminated.

=== Fifth round ===
23 May 2015
21:00

Juvenes/Dogana	0–0 (a.e.t.)	La Fiorita
	Report
Penalties
	4–2

Campo sportivo di Fonte dell'Ovo, San Marino

La Fiorita eliminated and qualified for Europa League first qualifying round.

=== Final ===
26 May 2015
21:00

Folgore	3–1	Juvenes/Dogana
Perrotta 43', 90'; Muccini 87'	Report	Gasperoni 24'

San Marino Stadium, Serravalle
Referee: Johnny Casanova

Folgore qualified for Champions League first qualifying round and Juvenes/Dogana qualified for Europa League first qualifying round.

== Season statistics ==
=== Top goalscorers ===
Rank	Scorer	Club	Goals
1	(Italy) Daniele Friguglietti	San Giovanni	16
2	(San Marino) Armando Aruci	Pennarossa	15
3	(San Marino) Andy Selva	La Fiorita	14
4	(Italy) Carlo Chiarabini	Domagnano	11
4	(Italy) O'Neal Ephraim	Tre Fiori	11
4	(San Marino) Francesco Perrotta	Folgore/Falciano	11
7	(San Marino) Giorgio Mariotti	Juvenes/Dogana	10
7	(San Marino) Adolfo Hirsch	Folgore/Falciano	10
7	(San Marino) Andrea Moroni	Faetano	10
10	(San Marino) Marco Casadei	Murata	9

_{Updated on 27 May 2015}

=== Hat-tricks ===
Player	For	Against	Result	Date
(San Marino) Adolfo Hirsch	Folgore/Falciano	Libertas	4–1	20 September 2014
(San Marino) Marco Casadei^{4}	Murata	Cosmos	5–2	26 September 2014

^{4} Player scored 4 goals

_{Updated on 1 October 2014}

== See also ==
- 2014–15 Coppa Titano
