= 2018–19 Campionato Sammarinese di Calcio =

Campionato Sammarinese di Calcio
- Season: 2018–19
- Dates: 21 September 2018 – 25 May 2019
- Champions: Tre Penne
- Champions League: Tre Penne
- Europa League: La Fiorita; Tre Fiori
- Matches: 158
- Goals: 503 (3.18 per match)
- All statistics correct as of 24 May 2019.

The 2018–19 Campionato Sammarinese di Calcio was the 34th season since its establishment. It is the highest level in San Marino, in which the country's top 15 amateur football clubs played. The season began on 21 September 2018 and concluded with the play-off final on 25 May 2019. La Fiorita were the defending champions from the previous season.

== Participating teams ==
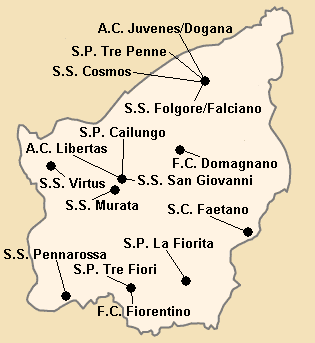
2018–19 Campionato Sammarinese di Calcio team distribution

Because there is no promotion or relegation in the league, the same 15 teams who competed in the league last season competed in the league this season.

- S.P. Cailungo (Borgo Maggiore)
- S.S. Cosmos (Serravalle)
- F.C. Domagnano (Domagnano)
- S.C. Faetano (Faetano)
- F.C. Fiorentino (Fiorentino)
- S.S. Folgore Falciano Calcio (Serravalle)
- A.C. Juvenes/Dogana (Serravalle)
- S.P. La Fiorita (Montegiardino)
- A.C. Libertas (Borgo Maggiore)
- S.S. Murata (San Marino)
- S.S. Pennarossa (Chiesanuova)
- S.S. San Giovanni (Borgo Maggiore)
- S.P. Tre Fiori (Fiorentino)
- S.P. Tre Penne (Serravalle)
- S.S. Virtus (Acquaviva)

== Regular season ==
The 15 clubs were split into two groups; one with eight clubs and another with seven clubs. All teams played once against the teams within their own group. At the end of the regular season, the top four from each group advanced to group 1 of the second stage. All other teams advanced to group 2 of the second stage.

=== Group A ===
Pos	Team	Pld	W	D	L	GF	GA	GD	Pts	Qualification
1	Tre Fiori	7	6	0	1	21	8	+13	18	Qualification for the Second stage – Group 1
2	Folgore	7	5	1	1	18	5	+13	16	Qualification for the Second stage – Group 1
3	Pennarossa	7	4	0	3	9	11	−2	12	Qualification for the Second stage – Group 1
4	Murata	7	3	2	2	11	12	−1	11	Qualification for the Second stage – Group 1
5	Juvenes/Dogana	7	3	1	3	12	11	+1	10	Qualification for the Second stage – Group 2
6	Tre Penne	7	3	0	4	19	9	+10	9	Qualification for the Second stage – Group 2
7	San Giovanni	7	0	3	4	2	16	−14	3	Qualification for the Second stage – Group 2
8	Virtus	7	0	1	6	4	24	−20	1	Qualification for the Second stage – Group 2

Source: UEFA, Soccerway
Rules for classification: 1) Points; 2) Goal difference; 3) Goals scored; 4) Head-to-head points; 5) head-to-head goal difference; 6) Head-to-head goals scored.

=== Group B ===
Pos	Team	Pld	W	D	L	GF	GA	GD	Pts	Qualification
1	La Fiorita	6	5	1	0	14	4	+10	16	Qualification for the Second stage – Group 1
2	Domagnano	6	4	1	1	8	3	+5	13	Qualification for the Second stage – Group 1
3	Fiorentino	6	3	3	0	11	6	+5	12	Qualification for the Second stage – Group 1
4	Libertas	6	2	2	2	9	11	−2	8	Qualification for the Second stage – Group 1
5	Cailungo	6	2	0	4	7	9	−2	6	Qualification for the Second stage – Group 2
6	Cosmos	6	1	1	4	9	14	−5	4	Qualification for the Second stage – Group 2
7	Faetano	6	0	0	6	2	13	−11	0	Qualification for the Second stage – Group 2

Source: UEFA, Soccerway
Rules for classification: 1) Points; 2) Goal difference; 3) Goals scored; 4) Head-to-head points; 5) head-to-head goal difference; 6) Head-to-head goals scored.

=== Results ===
Home \ Away	CAI	COS	DOM	FAE	FTO	FOL	J/D	LFI	LIB	MUR	PEN	SGI	TFI	TPE	VIR
Cailungo		2–1	1–3		0–1										
Cosmos			1–3					0–4	3–3						
Domagnano				1–0	0–0				1–0						
Faetano	1–3	0–4						0–1							
Fiorentino		2–0		3–1				2–2							
Folgore							2–1				3–0	0–0		3–0	
Juvenes/Dogana										2–2	3–0	4–1			1–0
La Fiorita	2–1		1–0						4–1						
Libertas	1–0			1–0	3–3										
Murata						1–7							3–1		4–0
Pennarossa										2–0			1–3	3–2	
San Giovanni										0–0	0–1		0–5		
Tre Fiori						2–0	3–1							2–1	5–2
Tre Penne							3–0			0–1		5–0			
Virtus						1–3					0–2	1–1		0–8	

Source: UEFA
Legend: Blue = home team win; Yellow = draw; Red = away team win.

== Second stage ==
The fifteen clubs played each other twice within their own group. At the end of the second stage, the first through sixth-placed clubs from group 1 advanced to the final stage. From group 2, the first and second-placed clubs advanced to the final stage.

=== Group 1 ===
Pos	Team	Pld	W	D	L	GF	GA	GD	Pts	Qualification
1	La Fiorita	14	12	1	1	48	10	+38	37	Qualification for the Final stage
2	Tre Fiori	14	6	4	4	32	23	+9	22	Qualification for the Final stage and Europa League preliminary round
3	Folgore	14	6	4	4	23	20	+3	22	Qualification for the Final stage
4	Libertas	14	3	6	5	23	23	0	15	Qualification for the Final stage
5	Fiorentino	14	3	6	5	20	24	−4	15	Qualification for the Final stage
6	Murata	14	4	3	7	12	30	−18	15	Qualification for the Final stage
7	Pennarossa	14	4	2	8	13	27	−14	14	
8	Domagnano	14	3	4	7	21	35	−14	13	

Source: UEFA, Soccerway
Rules for classification: 1) Points; 2) Head-to-head points; 3) Head-to-head goal difference; 4) Head-to-head goals scored; 5) Goal difference; 6) Goals scored.

=== Group 2 ===
Pos	Team	Pld	W	D	L	GF	GA	GD	Pts	Qualification
1	Tre Penne	12	11	1	0	34	6	+28	34	Qualification for the Final stage
2	Juvenes/Dogana	12	6	4	2	27	14	+13	22	Qualification for the play–off
3	Cosmos	12	5	3	4	13	14	−1	18	Qualification for the play–off
4	Faetano	12	5	2	5	24	17	+7	17	
5	Cailungo	12	4	5	3	18	21	−3	17	
6	San Giovanni	12	2	2	8	6	22	−16	8	
7	Virtus	12	0	1	11	9	37	−28	1	

Source: UEFA, Soccerway
Rules for classification: 1) Points; 2) Head-to-head points; 3) Head-to-head goal difference; 4) Head-to-head goals scored; 5) Goal difference; 6) Goals scored.

==== Play–off ====
The winner of the play–off, Juvenes/Dogana, advanced to the final stage.

3 April 2019	Juvenes/Dogana	3–1	Cosmos	Serravalle
20:45	Sorrentino 25'; Cavalli 59' (aut.); Gasperoni 82'	Report	Caminero Cuis 68'	Stadium: San Marino Stadium; Referee: Andrea Mei

=== Results ===
Home \ Away	CAI	COS	DOM	FAE	FTO	FOL	J/D	LFI	LIB	MUR	PEN	SGI	TFI	TPE	VIR
Cailungo		0–0		2–1			2–2					1–0		0–3	3–2
Cosmos	1–1			1–0			0–2					5–1		0–2	2–0
Domagnano					2–1	2–2		2–4	2–2	0–1	2–3		2–2		
Faetano	3–2	1–1					1–2					1–0		0–2	5–0
Fiorentino			2–0			2–3		0–2	2–2	0–3	1–1		2–2		
Folgore			3–4		1–1			1–2	3–2	0–0	1–0		3–2		
Juvenes/Dogana	1–1	3–1		3–3								2–0		0–0	7–1
La Fiorita			4–0		5–2	2–1			2–0	3–0	7–1		4–1		
Libertas			3–3		1–1	0–1		1–1		3–1	3–0		2–2		
Murata			2–3		0–2	0–0		0–9	2–1		1–0		0–3		
Pennarossa			2–0		0–2	3–1		1–0	1–3	1–1			0–3		
San Giovanni	1–1	0–1		1–5			1–0							0–3	0–0
Tre Fiori			5–0		2–2	0–3		0–3	2–0	5–1	3–1				
Tre Penne	5–2	4–0		2–1			2–1					3–1			4–1
Virtus	2–3	0–1		1–3			2–4					0–1		0–4	

Source: UEFA
Legend: Blue = home team win; Yellow = draw; Red = away team win.

== 5th-8th Place ==
=== Bracket ===
Semi-finals
Juvenes/Dogana	4
Murata	0
Fiorentino	0
Folgore	4

5th place
Juvenes/Dogana	1
Folgore	0
7th place
Murata	3
Fiorentino	0

=== Summary ===
Semi-finals
Team 1	Score	Team 2
Juvenes/Dogana	4–0	Murata
Fiorentino	0–4	Folgore

7th place
Team 1	Score	Team 2
Murata	3–0	Fiorentino

5th place
Team 1	Score	Team 2
Juvenes/Dogana	1–0	Folgore

=== Semifinals ===
10 May 2019	Juvenes/Dogana	4–0	Murata	Acquaviva
20:45 CEST	L. Sorrentino 8'; L. Ceveoli 15', 70'; T. Raschi 38'	Report		Stadium: Campo Sportivo di Acquaviva; Referee: Cristiano Ascari

10 May 2019	Fiorentino	0–4	Folgore	Domagnano
20:45 CEST		Report	C. Brolli 29'; W. Innocenti 51'; U. Semeraro 77'; I. Badalassi 79'	Stadium: Stadio di Domagnano; Referee: Gianluca Ceccarelli

=== 7th place ===
16 May 2019	Murata	3–0	Fiorentino	Acquaviva
20:45 CEST	L. Ortibaldi 21'; A. Di Filippo 45'; J.G. Sosa 90'	Report		Stadium: Campo Sportivo di Acquaviva; Referee: Nicola Villa

=== 5th place ===
16 May 2019	Juvenes/Dogana	1–0	Folgore	Domagnano
20:45 CEST	L. Sorrentino 70'	Report		Stadium: Stadio di Domagnano; Referee: Giacomo Cenci

== Final stage ==
The eight clubs which advanced from the second stage competed in a knockout format final stage to determine the champion of the league.

=== Bracket ===
Quarterfinals
La Fiorita	1	5	6
Juvenes/Dogana	0	0	0
Libertas	1	4	5
Murata	0	0	0
Tre Fiori	2	1	3
Fiorentino	1	0	1
Tre Penne	1	1	2
Folgore	0	1	1

Semifinals
La Fiorita	1	4	5
Libertas	0	0	0
Tre Fiori	0	1	1
Tre Penne	1	2	3

Finals
La Fiorita	1
Tre Penne	3
Third place
Libertas	1
Tre Fiori	3

=== Summary ===
The first legs of the quarter-finals were played from 25 to 28 April 2019 and the second legs were played from 2 to 5 May 2019. The first legs of the semi-finals will be played on 11–12 May 2019 and the second legs will be played on 17–18 May 2019.

Quarter finals
Team 1	Agg.	Team 2	1st leg	2nd leg
La Fiorita	6–0	Juvenes/Dogana	1–0	5–0
Libertas	5–0	Murata	1–0	4–0
Tre Fiori	3–1	Fiorentino	2–1	1–0
Tre Penne	2–1	Folgore	1–0	1–1

Semi finals
Team 1	Agg.	Team 2	1st leg	2nd leg
La Fiorita	5–0	Libertas	1–0	4–0
Tre Fiori	1–3	Tre Penne	0–1	1–2

Third place
Team 1	Score	Team 2
Libertas	1–3	Tre Fiori

Final
Team 1	Score	Team 2
La Fiorita	1–3	Tre Penne

=== Quarterfinals ===
25 April 2019
20:45 CEST

La Fiorita	1–0	Juvenes/Dogana
S. Olivi 49'	Report

Campo Sportivo di Acquaviva, Acquaviva
Referee: Luca Zani
2 May 2019
20:45 CEST

Juvenes/Dogana	0–5	La Fiorita
	Report	D. Rinaldi 14', 61'; F. Castellazzi 39', 58'; M. Souare 68'

Stadio Fonte Dell'Ovo, City of San Marino
Referee: Emiliano Albani

La Fiorita won 6–0 on aggregate.

26 April 2019
20:45 CEST

Libertas	1–0	Murata
M. Battistini 41'	Report

Stadio Fonte Dell'Ovo, City of San Marino
Referee: Giacomo Cenci
3 May 2019
20:45 CEST

Murata	0–4	Libertas
	Report	P. Giulianelli 15'; G. Morelli 24', 88'; F. Pesaresi 86'

Stadio Fonte Dell'Ovo, City of San Marino
Referee: Marco Avoni

Libertas won 5–0 on aggregate.

27 April 2019
15:00 CEST

Tre Fiori	2–1	Fiorentino
A. Compagno 20', 40'	Report	S. Rossi 14'

Stadio Fonte Dell'Ovo, City of San Marino
Referee: Joan Guiu Serra
4 May 2019
15:00 CEST

Fiorentino	0–1	Tre Fiori
	Report	D. Massaro 83'

Stadio Fonte Dell'Ovo, City of San Marino
Referee: Antonio Ucini

Tre Fiori won 3–1 on aggregate.

28 April 2019
15:00 CEST

Tre Penne	1–0	Folgore
M. Angelini 33'	Report

Campo Sportivo di Acquaviva, Acquaviva
Referee: Luis do Nascimento
5 May 2019
15:00 CEST

Folgore	1–1	Tre Penne
I. Badalassi 7'	Report	N. Gai 6'

Stadio Fonte Dell'Ovo, City of San Marino
Referee: Michele Scarpino

Tre Penne won 2–1 on aggregate.

=== Semifinals ===
11 May 2019
15:00 CEST

La Fiorita	1–0	Libertas
F. Castellazzi 30'	Report

Stadio Fonte Dell'Ovo, City of San Marino
Referee: Antonio Ucini
17 May 2019
20:45 CEST

Libertas	0–4	La Fiorita
	Report	Valentini 48', 54'; Rinaldi 61'; A.Chiurato 87'

Campo Sportivo di Acquaviva, Acquaviva
Referee: Gianluca Ceccarelli

La Fiorita won 5–0 on aggregate.

12 May 2019
15:00 CEST

Tre Fiori	0–1	Tre Penne
	Report	K. Marigliano 67'

Stadio Fonte Dell'Ovo, City of San Marino
Referee: Emiliano Albani
18 May 2019
20:45 CEST

Tre Penne	2–1	Tre Fiori
Cesarini 67'; N. Gai 84'	Report	M. Vassallo 59'

Campo Sportivo di Acquaviva, Acquaviva
Referee: Marco Avoni

Tre Penne won 3–1 on aggregate.

=== Final ===
25 May 2019
20:45 CEST

La Fiorita	1–3 (a.e.t.)	Tre Penne
A. Chiurato 43'		S. Fraternali 90+2'; M. Angelini 100'; K. Marigliano 115'

Stadio Fonte Dell'Ovo, City of San Marino
Referee: Luca Barbeno

Tre Penne qualified for 2019–20 Champions League preliminary round and La Fiorita qualified for 2019–20 Europa League preliminary round.
