= 2013–14 Campionato Sammarinese di Calcio =

Campionato Sammarinese di Calcio
- Season: 2013–14
- Champions: La Fiorita
- Champions League: La Fiorita
- Europa League: Folgore; Libertas
- Matches: 83
- Goals: 229 (2.76 per match)
- Highest scoring: (Romania) Valentin Grigore (San Marino) Giacomo Gualtieri (18 goals)

The 2013–14 Campionato Sammarinese di Calcio season was the twenty-ninth since its establishment. The league is the uppermost in San Marino, in which the country's top 15 amateur football clubs play. The season began on 13 September 2013 and ended with the play-off final on 27 May 2014.

== Participating teams ==
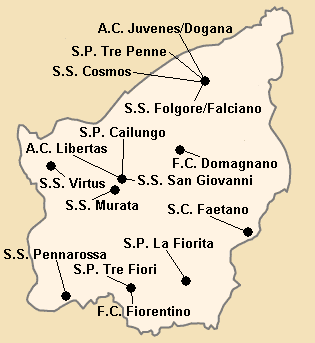
2013–14 Campionato Sammarinese di Calcio team distribution

Because there is no promotion or relegation in the league, the same 15 teams who competed in the league last season will compete in the league this season.

- S.P. Cailungo (Borgo Maggiore)
- S.S. Cosmos (Serravalle)
- F.C. Domagnano (Domagnano)
- S.C. Faetano (Faetano)
- F.C. Fiorentino (Fiorentino)
- S.S. Folgore/Falciano (Serravalle)
- A.C. Juvenes/Dogana (Serravalle)
- S.P. La Fiorita (Montegiardino)
- A.C. Libertas (Borgo Maggiore)
- S.S. Murata (San Marino)
- S.S. Pennarossa (Chiesanuova)
- S.S. San Giovanni (Borgo Maggiore)
- S.P. Tre Fiori (Fiorentino)
- S.P. Tre Penne (Serravalle)
- S.S. Virtus (Acquaviva)

== Regular season ==
The 15 clubs are split into two groups; one with eight clubs and another with seven clubs.

=== Group A ===
Pos	Team	Pld	W	D	L	GF	GA	GD	Pts	Qualification
1	Tre Fiori	21	12	5	4	34	20	+14	41	Qualification for the championship play–offs
2	Tre Penne	21	10	7	4	25	15	+10	37	Qualification for the championship play–offs
3	Faetano	21	10	6	5	35	27	+8	36	Qualification for the championship play–offs
4	Libertas	21	8	7	6	26	18	+8	31	Qualification for the Europa League first qualifying round (Note: Libertas qualified for the 2014–15 UEFA Europa League first qualifying round by winning the 2013–14 Coppa Titano.)
5	Virtus	21	3	7	11	21	35	−14	16	
6	Fiorentino	21	4	4	13	25	45	−20	16	
7	Murata	21	3	3	15	13	34	−21	12	
8	Domagnano	21	2	3	16	16	46	−30	9	

Source: Soccerway
Rules for classification: 1) points; 2) goal difference; 3) number of goals scored.

=== Group B ===
Pos	Team	Pld	W	D	L	GF	GA	GD	Pts	Qualification
1	La Fiorita	20	14	4	2	47	18	+29	46	Qualification for the championship play–offs
2	Cosmos	20	12	2	6	44	26	+18	38	Qualification for the championship play–offs
3	Folgore	20	11	5	4	36	18	+18	38	Qualification for the championship play–offs
4	Juvenes/Dogana	20	10	7	3	35	20	+15	37	
5	Pennarossa	20	10	4	6	28	19	+9	34	
6	Cailungo	20	5	5	10	27	42	−15	20	
7	San Giovanni	20	3	5	12	23	52	−29	14	

Source: Soccerway
Rules for classification: 1) points; 2) goal difference; 3) number of goals scored.

== Results ==
All teams will play twice against the teams within their own group and once against the teams from the other group. This means that the clubs in the eight-club group will play 21 matches each while the clubs in the seven-club group will play 20 matches each during the regular season.

Home \ Away	CAI	COS	DOM	FAE	FIO	FOL	J/D	LFI	LIB	MUR	PEN	SGI	TFI	TPE	VIR
Cailungo		0–5	4–2	0–1		0–4	0–0	0–6	1–2	3–0	1–1	3–1		1–1	
Cosmos	3–1		4–0	5–2		0–1	2–1	1–3		0–1	0–1	2–1	1–0		
Domagnano				1–3	2–3	0–3	0–4	0–2	1–2	1–4		2–0	0–1	0–1	1–1
Faetano			0–1		2–0	1–1	1–3		2–1	2–1	0–0	4–2	0–1	0–0	1–1
Fiorentino	2–3	1–2	1–1	2–3		1–3	3–3	0–3	0–1	1–0		1–1	2–3	2–1	1–0
Folgore	3–1	0–3					1–1	0–1			1–2	1–1	2–1	1–1	2–0
Juvenes/Dogana	2–1	0–3				3–3		2–1	0–0	1–0	3–2	3–0		1–0	
La Fiorita	4–3	2–0		2–2		2–0	1–3				2–1	5–3	1–1		1–0
Libertas		1–1	2–0	1–2	4–0	0–2		1–1		1–0	1–2		1–1	0–2	4–1
Murata			2–0	0–4	0–0	0–2		0–4	1–1		0–1	1–2	0–2	0–1	0–0
Pennarossa	1–0	4–0	1–1		5–3	0–1	0–0	0–2				2–0	1–2	0–2	
San Giovanni	2–2	4–4				0–5	0–4	1–4	1–0		0–2		2–2	0–3	2–1
Tre Fiori	1–2		3–1	3–0	2–1		1–0		0–0	2–1				1–3	3–3
Tre Penne		2–3	2–1	1–1	1–0			0–0	0–0	2–1			0–2		1–0
Virtus	1–1	1–5	4–1	0–3	2–0		1–1		0–1	4–1	0–2		0–3	1–1	

Source: UEFA.com
Legend: Blue = home team win; Yellow = draw; Red = away team win.

== Play-offs ==
The play-offs were held in a double-eliminination format. Both group winners (Tre Fiori and La Fiorita) earned byes in the first and second round.

=== First round ===
3 May 2014
17:00

Cosmos	0–0 (a.e.t.)	Faetano
Penalties
	4–3

Campo di Fiorentino, Fiorentino

3 May 2014
17:00

Tre Penne	1–1 (a.e.t.)	Folgore
Cibelli 90+4' (pen.)		Della Valle 45'
Penalties
	4–5

Campo sportivo di Fonte dell'Ovo, San Marino

=== Second round ===
8 May 2014
21:00

Faetano	2–1	Tre Penne
Valentini 54'; A. Moroni 90+2'		Pignieri 5'

Campo sportivo di Fonte dell'Ovo, San Marino

9 May 2014
21:00

Cosmos	0–2	Folgore
		Della Valle 57'; Ceschi 83'

Campo di Fiorentino, Fiorentino

Tre Penne eliminated.

=== Third round ===
10 May 2014
17:00

La Fiorita	0–0 (a.e.t.)	Tre Fiori
Penalties
	1–4

Campo sportivo di Fonte dell'Ovo, San Marino

13 May 2014
21:00

Faetano	0–1	Cosmos
		Genestreti 54'

Campo sportivo di Fonte dell'Ovo, San Marino

Faetano eliminated.

=== Fourth round ===
16 May 2014
21:00

Tre Fiori	0–1	Folgore
		Perrotta 12'

Campo sportivo di Fonte dell'Ovo, San Marino

19 May 2014
21:00

Cosmos	1–2	La Fiorita
di Paolo 86'		Selva 48'; Gualtieri 73'

Campo sportivo di Fonte dell'Ovo, San Marino

Cosmos eliminated.

=== Fifth round ===
23 May 2014
21:00

La Fiorita	4–1	Tre Fiori
Rinaldi 1'; Vendemini 38' (o.g.); Selva 52' (pen.); Gualtieri 67'		Bettini 58'

Stadio Olimpico, Serravalle
Referee: Michele Cruciani

Tre Fiori eliminated.

=== Final ===
27 May 2014
21:00

Folgore	0–2	La Fiorita
		Pensalfini 76'; Gualtieri 90+1'

Stadio Olimpico, Serravalle
Referee: Johnny Casanova

La Fiorita qualifies for 2014–15 UEFA Champions League first qualifying round, Folgore qualifies for 2014–15 UEFA Europa League first qualifying round.
