= 2010–11 Campionato Sammarinese di Calcio =

Campionato Sammarinese di Calcio
- Season: 2010-11
- Champions: Tre Fiori (7th title)
- Champions League: Tre Fiori
- Europa League: Juvenes/Dogana; Tre Penne
- Matches: 155
- Goals: 437 (2.82 per match)
- Biggest home win: Folgore 5–0 S.S. Cosmos; Faetano 5-0 Cailungo
- Biggest away win: Folgore 0–5 Murata
- Highest scoring: La Fiorita 6–3 San Giovanni

The 2010–11 Campionato Sammarinese di Calcio season was the twenty-sixth since its establishment. The season began with the first regular season games on 17 September 2010 and ended with the play-off final in May 2011. Tre Fiori are the league champions, having won their seventh Sammarinese championship and third-in-a-row last season.

== Teams ==
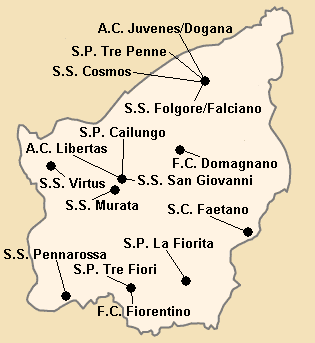
2010–11 Campionato Sammarinese di Calcio team distribution

Because there is no promotion or relegation in the league, the same 15 teams who competed in the league last season competed in the league this season.

- S.P. Cailungo (Borgo Maggiore)
- S.S. Cosmos (Serravalle)
- F.C. Domagnano (Domagnano)
- S.C. Faetano (Faetano)
- S.S. Folgore Falciano Calcio (Serravalle)
- F.C. Fiorentino (Fiorentino)
- A.C. Juvenes/Dogana (Serravalle)
- S.P. La Fiorita (Montegiardino)
- A.C. Libertas (Borgo Maggiore)
- S.S. Murata (San Marino)
- S.S. Pennarossa (Chiesanuova)
- S.S. San Giovanni (Borgo Maggiore)
- S.P. Tre Fiori (Fiorentino)
- S.P. Tre Penne (Serravalle)
- S.S. Virtus (Acquaviva)

=== Venues ===
The teams do not have grounds of their own due to restricted space in San Marino. Each match was randomly assigned to one of the following grounds:

- Stadio Olimpico (Serravalle)
- Campo di Fiorentino (Fiorentino)
- Campo di Acquaviva (Chiesanuova)
- Campo di Dogana (Serravalle)
- Campo Fonte dell'Ovo (Domagnano)
- Campo di Serravalle "B" (Serravalle)

== Regular season ==
=== Group A ===
Pos	Team	Pld	W	D	L	GF	GA	GD	Pts	Qualification
1	Pennarossa	20	13	3	4	31	15	+16	42	Qualification for the championship play–offs
2	La Fiorita	20	10	6	4	44	28	+16	36 (Note: LFI 1-2 COS; COS 0-1 LFI)	Qualification for the championship play–offs
3	Cosmos	20	11	3	6	22	22	0	36	Qualification for the championship play–offs
4	Juvenes/Dogana	20	8	5	7	37	31	+6	29	Qualification for the Europa League second qualifying round (Note: Juvenes/Dogana have qualified for the second qualifying round of the 2011–12 UEFA Europa League by winning the 2010–11 Coppa Titano.)
5	Faetano	20	7	3	10	30	33	−3	24	
6	Fiorentino	20	5	4	11	22	37	−15	19	
7	Cailungo	20	2	4	14	17	40	−23	10	

Source: fsgc.sm (in Italian)
Rules for classification: 1) points; 2) head-to-head points; 3) head-to-head goal difference; 4) head-to-head goals scored; 5) goal difference; 6) number of goals scored.

=== Group B ===
Pos	Team	Pld	W	D	L	GF	GA	GD	Pts	Qualification
1	Tre Fiori	21	11	6	4	41	26	+15	39	Qualification for the championship play–offs
2	Libertas	21	10	7	4	26	13	+13	37	Qualification for the championship play–offs
3	Tre Penne	21	10	6	5	32	19	+13	36	Qualification for the championship play–offs
4	Murata	21	9	8	4	34	19	+15	35	
5	Virtus	21	8	6	7	32	32	0	30	
6	San Giovanni	21	9	2	10	29	34	−5	29	
7	Folgore	21	3	4	14	21	44	−23	13	
8	Domagnano	21	0	9	12	17	42	−25	9	

Source: fsgc.sm (in Italian)
Rules for classification: 1) points; 2) head-to-head points; 3) head-to-head goal difference; 4) head-to-head goals scored; 5) goal difference; 6) number of goals scored.

=== Results ===
All teams played twice against the teams within their own group and once against the teams from the other group. This meant that the clubs in Group A played 20 matches each while the clubs in the Group B played 21 matches each during the regular season.

Home \ Away	CAI	COS	DOM	FAE	FIO	FOL	J/D	LFI	LIB	MUR	PEN	SGI	TFI	TPE	VIR
Cailungo		1–1	2–2	0–1	2–3	0–1	1–3	1–1			3–0	0–4			1–3
Cosmos	1–0			0–3	2–1		1–0	0–1	1–0	2–0	0–0				1–2
Domagnano		0–1		1–1	2–2	1–1		1–1	1–3	0–4		0–2	1–3	0–0	0–2
Faetano	5–0	1–3			0–1		3–0	1–3		0–0	0–3	1–2		1–4	2–4
Fiorentino	1–0	1–2		1–2			1–2	3–2		1–3	0–1	0–1			0–0
Folgore		5–0	2–0	1–3	1–1		1–5	1–3	1–1	0–5	0–1	2–3	3–3	1–2	0–1
Juvenes/Dogana	4–1	0–2	3–3	1–3	1–3			4–4	1–1		0–1	3–1	0–1	3–2	
La Fiorita	0–1	1–2		5–1	4–1		0–2				2–1	6–3	0–0	2–2	
Libertas	2–0		1–0	0–0	4–1	3–0		1–3		1–1		2–0	0–1	0–0	1–1
Murata	2–1		2–0			2–0	0–0	2–2	0–0		1–1	1–0	1–1	0–1	2–3
Pennarossa	1–0	2–0	3–0	3–2	0–0		0–3	1–2	2–0				2–1		5–1
San Giovanni		0–2	3–0			2–0			0–2	1–3	0–3		1–4	0–1	4–3
Tre Fiori	3–3	4–1	3–2	1–0	4–1	4–0			0–2	2–3		1–1		1–1	2–0
Tre Penne	2–0	0–0	2–2		4–0	3–1			0–1	2–1	0–1	0–1	0–1		3–1
Virtus			1–1			1–0	2–2	0–2	0–1	1–1		0–0	4–1	2–3	

Source: Soccerway
Legend: Blue = home team win; Yellow = draw; Red = away team win.

== Play-off ==
The playoff was held in a double-eliminination format. Both group winners earned byes in the first and second round.

All times CEST

=== First round ===
4 May 2011
21:15

La Fiorita	3–1	Tre Penne
Bollini 50'; Parma 55'; Monac 65'	Report	Cibelli 8'

Stadio Fonte dell'Ovo, Montecchio
Referee: Sabatino

3 May 2011
21:15

Libertas	0–2	Cosmos
	Report	Montagna 25'; Lazzarini 71'

Campo Sportivo di Fiorentino Federico Crescentini, Fiorentino
Referee: Cappetta

=== Second round ===
7 May 2011
21:15

La Fiorita	2–4	Cosmos
Parma 12'; Bollini 29'		Lazzarini 2'; Montagna 10', 19' (pen.); Fucili 25'

Campo Sportivo di Fiorentino Federico Crescentini, Fiorentino

7 May 2011
17:00

Tre Penne	4–1	Libertas
Cibelli 10', 12'; Valli 35'; Simoncini 83'	Report	Mazzoli 37'

Campo Sportivo di Fiorentino Federico Crescentini, Fiorentino

Libertas were eliminated.

=== Third round ===
11 May 2011
21:15

Pennarossa	1–2 (a.e.t.)	Tre Fiori
Andreini 35' (o.g.)		Buonocore 52'; Macerata 110'

Stadio Fonte Dell'Ovo, Montecchio

12 May 2011
21:15

La Fiorita	0–2	Tre Penne
		Di Giuli 40'; Olivieri 52'

Stadio Fonte Dell'Ovo, Montecchio

La Fiorita were eliminated.

=== Fourth round ===
17 May 2011
21:15

Tre Fiori	2–0	Cosmos
Menin 74'; Aruta 90' (pen.)

Stadio Fonte Dell'Ovo, Montecchio

16 May 2011
21:15

Pennarossa	1–3	Tre Penne
Berretti 90' (pen.)		Valli 71'; Cibelli 85'; Pignieri 90+4'

Stadio Fonte Dell'Ovo, Montecchio

Pennarossa were eliminated.

=== Semifinal ===
21 May 2011
21:00

Cosmos	1–2 (a.e.t.)	Tre Penne
Montagna 35' (pen.)		Molinari 24' (o.g.); Di Giuli 114'

Stadio Olimpico, Serravalle

Cosmos were eliminated.

=== Final ===
The winner of the final qualifies for the first qualifying round of the 2011–12 UEFA Champions League, while the runner-up qualifies for the first qualifying round of the 2011–12 UEFA Europa League.

26 May 2011
21:00

Tre Fiori	1–0	Tre Penne
Giunta 21'

Stadio Olimpico, Serravalle

== Top goalscorers ==
Including matches played on 17 April 2011; Source: Soccerway

Rank	Player	Club	Goals
1	(San Marino) Marco Fantini	Juvenes/Dogana	12
1	(San Marino) José Hirsch	Virtus	12
1	(Italy) Alessandro Giunta	Tre Fiori	12
1	(Italy) Francesco Viroli	Faetano	12
1	(Italy) Roberto Gatti	Murata	12
6	(San Marino) Marco Ugolini	San Giovanni	11
7	(Italy) Daniele Pignieri	Tre Penne	10
8	(San Marino) Simon Parma	La Fiorita	9
8	(Italy) Sossio Aruta	Tre Fiori	9
8	(Albania) Elton Shabani	Virtus	9
