= 2019–20 Campionato Sammarinese di Calcio =

Campionato Sammarinese di Calcio
- Season: 2019–20
- Champions: Tre Fiori
- Champions League: Tre Fiori
- Europa League: Tre Penne; La Fiorita
- Matches: 105
- Goals: 333 (3.17 per match)

The 2019–20 Campionato Sammarinese di Calcio was the 35th edition of the league competition in San Marino, where the country's top 15 amateur football clubs play. The season began on 20 September 2019.

Tre Penne were the defending champions after defeating La Fiorita in the previous season's final.

The competition was abandoned due to the COVID-19 pandemic in San Marino. Based on league position at the time of abandonment, Tre Fiori were declared champions and selected to play in the 2020–21 UEFA Champions League. Folgore and Tre Penne were selected to play in the 2020–21 UEFA Europa League. In July, UEFA informed the FSGC that Folgore was ineligible to obtain the UEFA licence. Therefore, La Fiorita replaced Folgore.

== Participating teams ==
Because there is no promotion or relegation in the league, the same 15 teams who competed in the league the previous season competed in the league again this season.

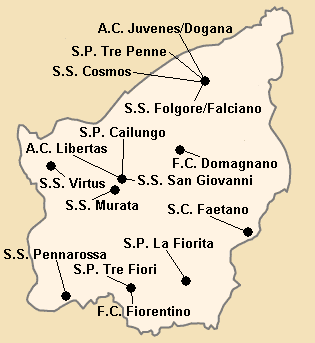
2019–20 Campionato Sammarinese di Calcio team distribution

- S.P. Cailungo (Borgo Maggiore)
- S.S. Cosmos (Serravalle)
- F.C. Domagnano (Domagnano)
- S.C. Faetano (Faetano)
- F.C. Fiorentino (Fiorentino)
- S.S. Folgore Falciano Calcio (Serravalle)
- A.C. Juvenes/Dogana (Serravalle)
- S.P. La Fiorita (Montegiardino)
- A.C. Libertas (Borgo Maggiore)
- S.S. Murata (San Marino)
- S.S. Pennarossa (Chiesanuova)
- S.S. San Giovanni (Borgo Maggiore)
- S.P. Tre Fiori (Fiorentino)
- S.P. Tre Penne (Serravalle)
- S.S. Virtus (Acquaviva)

== First phase ==
The 15 teams were split into two groups; one with eight teams and a second with seven. The teams played once against the teams within their own group. At the end of the first phase, the top four from each group advanced to group 1 of the second phase. All other teams advanced to group 2 of the second phase.

=== Group A ===
| Pos | Team | Pld | W | D | L | GF | GA | GD | Pts | Qualification | LFI | TFI | MUR | FOL | PEN | DOM | FAE | JUV |
|---|---|---|---|---|---|---|---|---|---|---|---|---|---|---|---|---|---|---|
| 1 | La Fiorita | 7 | 5 | 2 | 0 | 10 | 3 | +7 | 17 | Qualification for the Second phase – Group 1 | — | — | — | — | 2–0 | 1–0 | 2–1 | — |
| 2 | Tre Fiori | 7 | 4 | 2 | 1 | 15 | 7 | +8 | 14 | Qualification for the Second phase – Group 1 | 1–1 | — | — | 1–0 | — | — | 3–2 | 4–0 |
| 3 | Murata | 7 | 4 | 1 | 2 | 11 | 8 | +3 | 13 | Qualification for the Second phase – Group 1 | 0–1 | 2–2 | — | 0–3 | 2–1 | — | — | — |
| 4 | Folgore | 7 | 3 | 3 | 1 | 15 | 6 | +9 | 12 | Qualification for the Second phase – Group 1 | 0–0 | — | — | — | 4–1 | 2–2 | — | — |
| 5 | Pennarossa | 7 | 4 | 0 | 3 | 11 | 11 | 0 | 12 | Qualification for the Second phase – Group 2 | — | 2–0 | — | — | — | 3–1 | — | 3–2 |
| 6 | Domagnano | 7 | 2 | 1 | 4 | 8 | 13 | −5 | 7 | Qualification for the Second phase – Group 2 | — | 0–4 | 1–2 | — | — | — | 2–0 | 2–1 |
| 7 | Faetano | 7 | 1 | 1 | 5 | 6 | 11 | −5 | 4 | Qualification for the Second phase – Group 2 | — | — | 0–2 | 1–1 | 0–1 | — | — | — |
| 8 | Juvenes/Dogana | 7 | 0 | 0 | 7 | 5 | 22 | −17 | 0 | Qualification for the Second phase – Group 2 | 1–3 | — | 0–3 | 1–5 | — | — | 0–2 | — |

Source: Soccerway
Legend: Blue = home team win; Yellow = draw; Red = away team win.
Rules for classification: 1) Points; 2) Goal difference; 3) Goals scored; 4) Head-to-head points; 5) head-to-head goal difference; 6) Head-to-head goals scored.

=== Group B ===
| Pos | Team | Pld | W | D | L | GF | GA | GD | Pts | Qualification | TPE | LIB | CAI | VIR | SGI | FTO | COS |
|---|---|---|---|---|---|---|---|---|---|---|---|---|---|---|---|---|---|
| 1 | Tre Penne | 6 | 6 | 0 | 0 | 20 | 5 | +15 | 18 | Qualification for the Second phase – Group 1 | — | 1–0 | — | 1–0 | — | 4–2 | — |
| 2 | Libertas | 6 | 5 | 0 | 1 | 16 | 6 | +10 | 15 | Qualification for the Second phase – Group 1 | — | — | 3–1 | — | 2–0 | — | 3–2 |
| 3 | Cailungo | 6 | 4 | 0 | 2 | 7 | 7 | 0 | 12 | Qualification for the Second phase – Group 1 | 1–3 | — | — | — | — | 1–0 | 2–1 |
| 4 | Virtus | 6 | 2 | 1 | 3 | 10 | 11 | −1 | 7 | Qualification for the Second phase – Group 1 | — | 2–4 | 0–1 | — | — | 3–3 | — |
| 5 | San Giovanni | 6 | 2 | 0 | 4 | 6 | 13 | −7 | 6 | Qualification for the Second phase – Group 2 | 2–7 | — | 0–1 | 1–3 | — | — | — |
| 6 | Fiorentino | 6 | 1 | 1 | 4 | 8 | 13 | −5 | 4 | Qualification for the Second phase – Group 2 | — | 0–4 | — | — | 0–1 | — | 3–0 |
| 7 | Cosmos | 6 | 0 | 0 | 6 | 4 | 16 | −12 | 0 | Qualification for the Second phase – Group 2 | 0–4 | — | — | 1–2 | 0–2 | — | — |

Source: Soccerway
Legend: Blue = home team win; Yellow = draw; Red = away team win.
Rules for classification: 1) Points; 2) Goal difference; 3) Goals scored; 4) Head-to-head points; 5) head-to-head goal difference; 6) Head-to-head goals scored.

== Second phase ==
The second phase began on 7 December 2019.

=== Group 1 ===
| Pos | Team | Pld | W | D | L | GF | GA | GD | Pts | Qualification | TFI | FOL | TPE | LFI | VIR | MUR | LIB | CAI |
|---|---|---|---|---|---|---|---|---|---|---|---|---|---|---|---|---|---|---|
| 1 | Tre Fiori | 8 | 6 | 2 | 0 | 23 | 11 | +12 | 20 | Qualification for the Champions League preliminary round | — | 1–1 | 3–3 | — | 3–1 | — | — | — |
| 2 | Folgore | 8 | 4 | 4 | 0 | 14 | 3 | +11 | 16 | | — | — | 0–0 | — | — | 5–0 | 0–0 | 3–0 |
| 3 | Tre Penne | 8 | 4 | 3 | 1 | 13 | 8 | +5 | 15 | Qualification for the Europa League preliminary round | 0–2 | 4–0 | — | 1–1 | — | 2–1 | 3–0 | — |
| 4 | La Fiorita | 8 | 4 | 2 | 2 | 13 | 8 | +5 | 14 | Qualification for the Europa League preliminary round | 1–2 | 0–2 | — | — | — | 2–1 | 5–0 | 2–1 |
| 5 | Virtus | 8 | 2 | 1 | 5 | 14 | 18 | −4 | 7 | | — | 1–2 | 1–3 | 0–0 | — | 3–4 | — | 1–3 |
| 6 | Murata | 8 | 2 | 1 | 5 | 10 | 17 | −7 | 7 | | 1–2 | — | — | 1–2 | — | — | — | — |
| 7 | Libertas | 8 | 1 | 2 | 5 | 5 | 17 | −12 | 5 | | 1–4 | 1–1 | — | — | 2–3 | 0–1 | — | — |
| 8 | Cailungo | 8 | 1 | 1 | 6 | 9 | 19 | −10 | 4 | | 3–6 | — | 0–1 | — | 1–4 | 1–1 | 0–1 | — |

Source: Soccerway
Legend: Blue = home team win; Yellow = draw; Red = away team win.
Rules for classification: 1) Points; 2) Head-to-head points; 3) Head-to-head goal difference; 4) Head-to-head goals scored; 5) Goal difference; 6) Goals scored.

=== Group 2 ===
| Pos | Team | Pld | W | D | L | GF | GA | GD | Pts | FAE | PEN | DOM | COS | FTO | SGI | JUV |
|---|---|---|---|---|---|---|---|---|---|---|---|---|---|---|---|---|
| 1 | Faetano | 7 | 6 | 1 | 0 | 17 | 6 | +11 | 19 | — | — | 1–0 | — | 4–0 | 1–0 | 3–1 |
| 2 | Pennarossa | 7 | 4 | 2 | 1 | 22 | 12 | +10 | 14 | 3–3 | — | — | 5–1 | 7–3 | — | — |
| 3 | Domagnano | 7 | 4 | 1 | 2 | 12 | 6 | +6 | 13 | — | 4–0 | — | — | — | 2–1 | 2–1 |
| 4 | Cosmos | 6 | 2 | 2 | 2 | 10 | 12 | −2 | 8 | 1–3 | — | 1–0 | — | — | 3–3 | — |
| 5 | Fiorentino | 7 | 1 | 2 | 4 | 9 | 21 | −12 | 5 | — | 1–4 | 1–3 | 1–1 | — | — | — |
| 6 | San Giovanni | 7 | 0 | 3 | 4 | 6 | 12 | −6 | 3 | — | 0–3 | 1–1 | — | 1–2 | — | 0–0 |
| 7 | Juvenes/Dogana | 7 | 0 | 3 | 4 | 4 | 11 | −7 | 3 | 1–2 | 0–0 | — | 0–3 | 1–1 | — | — |

Source: Soccerway
Legend: Blue = home team win; Yellow = draw; Red = away team win.
Rules for classification: 1) Points; 2) Head-to-head points; 3) Head-to-head goal difference; 4) Head-to-head goals scored; 5) Goal difference; 6) Goals scored.
