= List of football clubs in San Marino =

There are 16 teams in the Sammarinese league system. The club Victor San Marino, based in Acquaviva, plays in the Italian league system.

Team	Location	Founded
A.C. Juvenes/Dogana	Serravalle	2000
A.C. Libertas	Borgo Maggiore	1928
F.C. Domagnano	Domagnano	1966
F.C. Fiorentino	Fiorentino	1974
S.C. Faetano	Faetano	1962
S.P. Cailungo	Borgo Maggiore	1974
S.P. La Fiorita	Montegiardino	1967
S.P. Tre Fiori	Fiorentino	1949
S.P. Tre Penne	Serravalle	1956
S.S. Cosmos	Serravalle	1979
S.S. Folgore Falciano Calcio	Serravalle	1972
S.S. Murata	San Marino	1966
S.S. Pennarossa	Chiesanuova	1968
S.S. San Giovanni	Borgo Maggiore	1948
S.S. Virtus	Acquaviva	1964
San Marino Academy	Acquaviva	2004
