= 2004–05 Campionato Sammarinese di Calcio =

Campionato Sammarinese di Calcio
- Season: 2004–05
- Champions: F.C. Domagnano

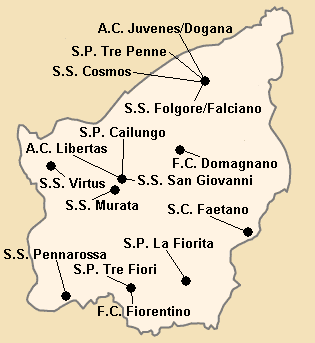
2004–05 Campionato Sammarinese di Calcio team distribution

The 2004–05 Campionato Sammarinese di Calcio season was the 20th season since its establishment. It was contested by 15 teams, and F.C. Domagnano won the championship.

== Regular season ==
=== Group A ===
Pos	Team	Pld	W	D	L	GF	GA	GD	Pts	Qualification
1	Tre Penne	20	14	2	4	43	23	+20	44	Qualification for the championship play–offs
2	Murata	20	11	6	3	39	23	+16	39	Qualification for the championship play–offs
3	Tre Fiori	20	10	4	6	38	24	+14	34	Qualification for the championship play–offs
4	Pennarossa	20	9	7	4	40	26	+14	34	
5	La Fiorita	20	6	7	7	27	28	−1	25	
6	Cailungo	20	4	5	11	27	42	−15	17	
7	Cosmos	20	1	2	17	16	71	−55	5	

Source: rsssf.com

=== Group B ===
Pos	Team	Pld	W	D	L	GF	GA	GD	Pts	Qualification
1	Libertas	21	15	3	3	46	22	+24	48	Qualification for the championship play–offs
2	Domagnano	21	11	7	3	50	25	+25	40	Qualification for the championship play–offs
3	Virtus	21	11	4	6	37	22	+15	37	Qualification for the championship play–offs
4	Faetano	21	9	6	6	42	27	+15	33	
5	Juvenes/Dogana	21	9	6	6	35	22	+13	33	
6	Folgore/Falciano	21	4	6	11	26	40	−14	18	
7	Montevito	21	3	6	12	22	40	−18	15	
8	San Giovanni	21	1	1	19	16	69	−53	4	

Source: rsssf.com

=== Results ===
All teams play twice against the teams within their own group and once against the teams from the other group.

Home \ Away	CAI	COS	DOM	FAE	FOL	J/D	LFI	LIB	MON	MUR	PEN	SGI	TFI	TPE	VIR
Cailungo		4–1		0–1		1–6	0–0			0–0	1–3	5–1	1–1	2–4	1–2
Cosmos	1–1			1–10		0–3	0–2	0–6	1–3	1–2	1–2		0–2	0–3	1–7
Domagnano	3–1	5–3		1–0	2–2	5–1		2–4	1–1			8–1		2–1	2–2
Faetano			2–1		3–1	3–1	1–1	4–3	2–0	2–2	1–2	5–2	0–3		0–2
Folgore	2–3	3–0	0–5	1–1		0–1		0–3	2–2	2–1		4–0		1–3	1–2
Juvenes/Dogana			0–0	0–0	0–0		0–0	2–1	1–1	1–3	1–1	3–1	1–0		1–2
La Fiorita	4–1	2–2	0–1		2–1				2–1	0–4	1–1		0–1	0–2	2–1
Libertas	1–0		1–1	2–0	1–0	1–0	1–0		2–1	1–0		1–0			2–2
Montevito	1–2		0–3	2–2	1–1	1–4		1–5			1–2	2–0		0–2	2–0
Murata	3–1	2–0	2–2				2–2		2–1		3–3	3–0	1–0	3–2	1–0
Pennarossa	1–1	7–0	1–1		2–2		1–1	2–3		1–2			1–3	1–2	
San Giovanni		2–0	1–3	0–4	1–2	1–8	0–4	2–3	0–0		0–2		3–4		0–2
Tre Fiori	3–1	0–3	2–0		5–0		4–2	1–2	3–1	2–2	1–2			0–1	
Tre Penne	4–1	5–1		1–1		0–1	4–2	2–1		2–1	0–3	2–1	2–2		
Virtus			0–2	1–0	2–1	1–0		2–2	3–0		1–2	4–0	1–1	0–1	

Legend: Blue = home team win; Yellow = draw; Red = away team win.

== Championship playoffs ==
=== First round ===
Team 1	Score	Team 2
Murata	1–2	Virtus
Domagnano	3–2	Tre Fiori

=== Second round ===
Team 1	Score	Team 2
Tre Penne	1–1 (4–5 p)	Domagnano
Libertas	1–0	Virtus

=== Third round ===
Team 1	Score	Team 2
Tre Penne	1–7	Murata
Virtus	2–0	Tre Fiori

=== Fourth round ===
Team 1	Score	Team 2
Domagnano	3–0	Libertas
Virtus	0–1	Murata

=== Semifinal ===
Team 1	Score	Team 2
Libertas	1–1 (2–3 p)	Murata

=== Final ===
Team 1	Score	Team 2
Domagnano	2–1	Murata
