= 2003–04 Campionato Sammarinese di Calcio =

Campionato Sammarinese di Calcio
- Season: 2003–04
- Champions: S.S. Pennarossa

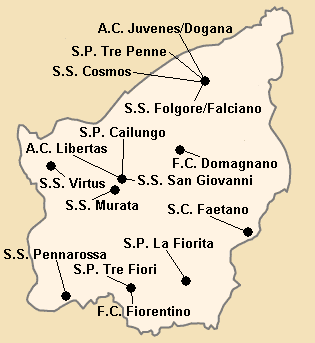
2003–04 Campionato Sammarinese di Calcio team distribution

The 2003–04 Campionato Sammarinese di Calcio season was the 19th season since its establishment. It was contested by 15 teams, and S.S. Pennarossa won the championship.

== Regular season ==
=== Group A ===
Pos	Team	Pld	W	D	L	GF	GA	GD	Pts	Qualification
1	Pennarossa	21	14	4	3	41	20	+21	46	Qualification for the championship play–offs
2	Juvenes/Dogana	21	13	5	3	49	18	+31	44	Qualification for the championship play–offs
3	Cailungo	21	13	1	7	43	22	+21	40	Qualification for the championship play–offs
4	Libertas	21	9	6	6	29	20	+9	33	
5	Tre Penne	21	7	2	12	22	35	−13	23	
6	San Giovanni	21	5	7	9	23	37	−14	22	
7	La Fiorita	21	5	6	10	24	33	−9	21	
8	Folgore/Falciano	21	1	4	16	15	58	−43	7	

Source: rsssf.com

=== Group B ===
Pos	Team	Pld	W	D	L	GF	GA	GD	Pts	Qualification
1	Domagnano	20	12	5	3	39	23	+16	41	Qualification for the championship play–offs
2	Murata	20	12	5	3	32	14	+18	41	Qualification for the championship play–offs
3	Virtus	20	11	5	4	48	24	+24	38	Qualification for the championship play–offs
4	Tre Fiori	20	10	5	5	35	20	+15	35	
5	Faetano	20	5	6	9	23	28	−5	21	
6	Cosmos	20	3	2	15	15	48	−33	11	
7	Montevito	20	1	3	16	16	54	−38	6	

Source: rsssf.com

=== Results ===
All teams play twice against the teams within their own group and once against the teams from the other group.

Home \ Away	CAI	COS	DOM	FAE	FOL	J/D	LFI	LIB	MON	MUR	PEN	SGI	TFI	TPE	VIR
Cailungo		2–1	1–2		7–0	1–3	3–0	2–0	4–2		1–3	5–0		2–0	0–2
Cosmos			0–3	1–0	2–5	2–4			1–1	0–4	0–3		0–3	2–1	0–2
Domagnano		0–0		2–1			2–1	2–1	5–0	2–2		3–3	2–1	1–3	2–2
Faetano	1–0	2–0	1–2					0–0	1–0	1–1		2–3	0–1	0–0	0–6
Folgore	0–1		0–4	0–5		0–3	0–4	0–4			1–1	0–2	0–3	1–1	
Juvenes/Dogana	0–1		2–0	0–0	4–2		3–0	0–2		0–0	1–1	6–0		2–1	2–0
La Fiorita	0–3	3–2		2–2	2–2	1–2		1–2			0–1	1–1		1–0	1–1
Libertas	1–2	3–1			3–0	1–2	0–0		4–1	0–0	0–3	1–0	1–2	1–0	
Montevito		3–1	0–2	1–3	2–2	1–6	0–1			0–5	1–3		2–2		0–5
Murata	1–0	2–0	0–1	2–0	1–0		2–2		1–0			3–2	1–0		1–2
Pennarossa	1–3		3–1	2–0	4–1	3–2	1–0	2–2		0–1		2–1		2–0	
San Giovanni	1–1	0–1			1–0	2–2	1–0	1–1	1–0		1–1		1–2	1–2	1–1
Tre Fiori	1–2	4–0	0–0	3–3		0–0	3–1		2–0	0–1	2–1				2–3
Tre Penne	3–2				1–0	0–5	2–3	0–1	2–1	2–1	0–1	3–0	1–3		
Virtus		3–1	2–3	2–1	3–1			1–1	3–1	2–3	2–3		1–1	5–0	

Legend: Blue = home team win; Yellow = draw; Red = away team win.

== Championship playoffs ==
=== First round ===
Team 1	Score	Team 2
Murata	2–1	Cailungo
Juvenes/Dogana	1–3	Virtus

=== Second round ===
Team 1	Score	Team 2
Pennarossa	5–3	Murata
Domagnano	2–1	Virtus

=== Third round ===
Team 1	Score	Team 2
Cailungo	4–2	Virtus
Juvenes/Dogana	1–3	Murata

=== Fourth round ===
Team 1	Score	Team 2
Pennarossa	1–4	Domagnano
Cailungo	3–1	Murata

=== Semifinal ===
Team 1	Score	Team 2
Pennarossa	3–0	Cailungo

=== Final ===
Team 1	Score	Team 2
Domagnano	2–2 (2–4 p)	Pennarossa
