= 2017–18 Campionato Sammarinese di Calcio =

Campionato Sammarinese di Calcio
- Season: 2017–18
- Dates: 8 September 2017 – 23 May 2018
- Champions: La Fiorita
- Champions League: La Fiorita
- Europa League: Folgore; Tre Fiori
- Matches: 164
- Goals: 529 (3.23 per match)
- All statistics correct as of 23 May 2018.

The 2017–18 Campionato Sammarinese di Calcio was the 33rd season since its establishment. It is the highest level in San Marino, in which the country's top 15 amateur football clubs played. The season begin on 8 September 2017 and concluded with the play-off final on 23 May 2018. La Fiorita were the defending champions from the previous season. The fixtures and group compositions were announced on 19 August 2017.

== Participating teams ==
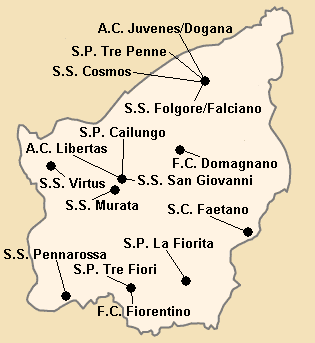
2017–18 Campionato Sammarinese di Calcio team distribution

Because there is no promotion or relegation in the league, the same 15 teams who competed in the league last season competed in the league this season.

- S.P. Cailungo (Borgo Maggiore)
- S.S. Cosmos (Serravalle)
- F.C. Domagnano (Domagnano)
- S.C. Faetano (Faetano)
- F.C. Fiorentino (Fiorentino)
- S.S. Folgore Falciano Calcio (Serravalle)
- A.C. Juvenes/Dogana (Serravalle)
- S.P. La Fiorita (Montegiardino)
- A.C. Libertas (Borgo Maggiore)
- S.S. Murata (San Marino)
- S.S. Pennarossa (Chiesanuova)
- S.S. San Giovanni (Borgo Maggiore)
- S.P. Tre Fiori (Fiorentino)
- S.P. Tre Penne (Serravalle)
- S.S. Virtus (Acquaviva)

== Regular season ==
The 15 clubs were split into two groups; one with eight clubs and another with seven clubs.

=== Group A ===
Pos	Team	Pld	W	D	L	GF	GA	GD	Pts	Qualification
1	La Fiorita	21	16	2	3	60	16	+44	50	Qualification for the championship play–offs
2	Tre Penne	21	16	2	3	52	13	+39	50	Qualification for the championship play–offs
3	Domagnano	21	11	4	6	40	35	+5	37	Qualification for the championship play–offs
4	Juvenes/Dogana	21	9	4	8	38	34	+4	31	
5	Cosmos	21	7	7	7	42	30	+12	28	
6	Pennarossa	21	6	7	8	21	36	−15	25	
7	Faetano	21	5	4	12	36	47	−11	19	
8	San Giovanni	21	4	1	16	18	61	−43	13	

Source: UEFA, Soccerway
Rules for classification: 1) Points; 2) Head-to-head points; 3) Head-to-head goal difference; 4) Head-to-head goals scored; 5) Goal difference; 6) Goals scored.

=== Group B ===
Pos	Team	Pld	W	D	L	GF	GA	GD	Pts	Qualification
1	Folgore	20	13	5	2	35	11	+24	44	Qualification for the championship play–offs
2	Libertas	20	14	2	4	42	15	+27	44	Qualification for the championship play–offs
3	Tre Fiori	20	11	5	4	45	24	+21	38	Qualification for the championship play–offs
4	Cailungo	20	6	4	10	21	29	−8	22	
5	Virtus	20	5	4	11	25	41	−16	19	
6	Fiorentino	20	4	2	14	13	39	−26	14	
7	Murata	20	0	1	19	11	68	−57	1	

Source: UEFA, Soccerway
Rules for classification: 1) Points; 2) Head-to-head points; 3) Head-to-head goal difference; 4) Head-to-head goals scored; 5) Goal difference; 6) Goals scored.

== Results ==
All teams played twice against the teams within their own group and once against the teams from the other group. This means that the clubs in the eight-club group played 21 matches each while the clubs in the seven-club group played 20 matches each during the regular season.

Home \ Away	CAI	COS	DOM	FAE	FTO	FOL	J/D	LFI	LIB	MUR	PEN	SGI	TFI	TPE	VIR
Cailungo	—	—	2–3	3–2	2–0	0–0	—	1–2	0–0	3–1	—	—	1–2	—	0–1
Cosmos	2–0	—	1–1	0–0	1–1	—	5–1	3–0	—	—	0–0	3–0	1–3	1–2	2–3
Domagnano	—	1–6	—	2–5	1–1	—	1–1	0–4	—	—	3–0	5–1	2–1	0–3	0–0
Faetano	—	1–1	0–1	—	1–0	0–2	1–3	0–3	1–2	6–1	3–1	1–3	—	1–3	—
Fiorentino	0–1	—	—	—	—	0–2	0–5	—	0–1	2–0	—	0–1	2–5	0–2	2–1
Folgore	2–0	3–3	3–2	—	3–1	—	—	0–1	0–0	4–0	—	—	1–2	1–0	2–1
Juvenes/Dogana	3–0	0–0	2–3	4–1	—	0–3	—	0–1	0–6	—	2–1	1–1	1–1	1–3	—
La Fiorita	—	3–0	0–2	3–1	5–0	—	1–3	—	3–1	9–0	5–0	5–0	—	1–0	5–1
Libertas	3–0	4–2	2–3	—	2–0	0–1	—	—	—	3–0	—	—	2–1	2–3	2–0
Murata	0–5	0–1	0–2	—	1–2	0–2	0–3	—	1–4	—	0–1	—	4–4	—	1–8
Pennarossa	1–1	3–2	0–4	3–3	0–2	1–1	2–1	1–1	0–1	—	—	3–0	—	0–5	—
San Giovanni	0–1	0–7	2–4	2–4	—	0–2	1–4	0–3	0–4	1–0	0–1	—	—	1–4	—
Tre Fiori	4–1	—	—	5–2	4–0	0–0	—	2–2	0–1	3–1	0–1	2–1	—	—	3–1
Tre Penne	3–0	4–1	1–0	2–0	—	—	3–0	1–3	—	3–0	0–0	6–1	0–0	—	4–0
Virtus	0–0	—	—	3–3	1–0	0–3	0–3	—	0–2	2–1	2–2	1–3	0–3	—	—

Source: UEFA
Legend: Blue = home team win; Yellow = draw; Red = away team win.

== Play-offs ==
The top three teams from each group advanced to a play-off which determined the season's champion and qualifiers for the Champions League and the Europa League.

The play-offs were played in a double-elimination format with both regular season group winners earning byes in the first and second round. All matches were decided over one leg with extra time and then penalties used to break ties, when required.

=== Bracket ===
First round
Match 1 – 29 April
Tre Penne	2 (3)
Tre Fiori	2 (5)
Match 2 – 29 April
Libertas	3
Domagnano	0

Second round
Match 3 – 3 May
Tre Fiori	1 (6)
Libertas	1 (5)
Match 4 – 4 May
Tre Penne	6
Domagnano	4

Third round
Match 5 – 5 May
La Fiorita	3
Folgore	1
Match 6 – 9 May
Tre Penne	2
Libertas	1

Fourth round
Match 7 – 10 May
La Fiorita	1
Tre Fiori	0
Match 8 – 13 May
Tre Penne	0 (2)
Folgore	0 (4)

Semi-final
Match 9 – 18 May
Folgore	3
Tre Fiori	1

Final
Match 10 – 23 May
La Fiorita	1
Folgore	0

=== First round ===
29 April 2018
20:45 CEST

Tre Penne	2–2 (a.e.t.)	Tre Fiori
Penalties
	3–5

29 April 2018
20:45 CEST

Libertas	3–0	Domagnano

=== Second round ===
3 May 2018
20:45 CEST

Tre Fiori	1–1 (a.e.t.)	Libertas
Penalties
	6–5

4 May 2018
20:45 CEST

Tre Penne	6–4 (a.e.t.)	Domagnano

Domagnano eliminated.

=== Third round ===
5 May 2018
15:00 CEST

La Fiorita	3–1	Folgore

9 May 2018
20:45 CEST

Tre Penne	2–1	Libertas

Libertas eliminated.

=== Fourth round ===
10 May 2018
20:45 CEST

La Fiorita	1–0	Tre Fiori

13 May 2018
15:00 CEST

Tre Penne	0–0 (a.e.t.)	Folgore
Penalties
	2–4

Tre Penne eliminated.

=== Semi-final ===
18 May 2018
20:45 CEST

Folgore	3–1	Tre Fiori

Referee: Cristiano Ascari

Tre Fiori eliminated and qualified for Europa League.

=== Final ===
23 May 2018
20:45 CEST

La Fiorita	1–0	Folgore
Gasperoni 29'

Campo sportivo di Fonte dell'Ovo, San Marino
Referee: Marco Avoni

La Fiorita qualified for 2018–19 Champions League preliminary round and Folgore qualified for 2018–19 Europa League preliminary round.
