= 2012–13 Campionato Sammarinese di Calcio =

Campionato Sammarinese di Calcio
- Season: 2012–13
- Champions League: Tre Penne
- Europa League: Libertas; La Fiorita
- Matches: 164
- Goals: 422 (2.57 per match)
- Top goalscorer: Alberto Cannini; Denis Iencinella (17 goals)
- Biggest home win: Libertas 6–1 Cailungo
- Biggest away win: Pennarossa 0–5 Murata
- Highest scoring: Virtus 4–5 Cailungo

The 2012–13 Campionato Sammarinese di Calcio season was the twenty-eighth since its establishment. The league is the uppermost in San Marino, in which the country's top 15 amateur football clubs play. The season began on 14 September 2012 and ended with the play-off final in May 2013. Tre Penne are the defending league champions, having won their first ever Sammarinese championship last season. Tre Penne retained their title, defeating ten-man AC Libertas 5–3 on penalties in a repeat of the previous year's play-off final.

== Participating teams ==
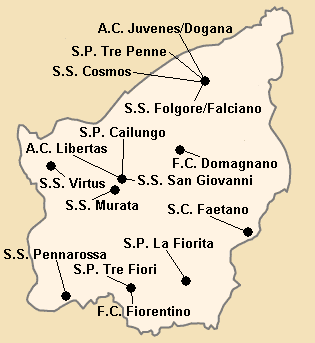
2012–13 Campionato Sammarinese di Calcio team distribution

Because there is no promotion or relegation in the league, the same 15 teams who competed in the league last season will compete in the league this season.

- S.P. Cailungo (Borgo Maggiore)
- S.S. Cosmos (Serravalle)
- F.C. Domagnano (Domagnano)
- S.C. Faetano (Faetano)
- S.S. Folgore/Falciano (Serravalle)
- F.C. Fiorentino (Fiorentino)
- A.C. Juvenes/Dogana (Serravalle)
- S.P. La Fiorita (Montegiardino)
- A.C. Libertas (Borgo Maggiore)
- S.S. Murata (San Marino)
- S.S. Pennarossa (Chiesanuova)
- S.S. San Giovanni (Borgo Maggiore)
- S.P. Tre Fiori (Fiorentino)
- S.P. Tre Penne (Serravalle)
- S.S. Virtus (Acquaviva)

== Venues ==
The teams do not have grounds of their own due to restricted space in San Marino. Each match was randomly assigned to one of the following grounds:

- Stadio Olimpico (Serravalle)
- Campo di Fiorentino (Fiorentino)
- Campo di Acquaviva (Chiesanuova)
- Campo di Dogana (Serravalle)
- Campo Fonte dell'Ovo (Domagnano)
- Campo di Serravalle "B" (Serravalle)

== Regular season ==
The 15 clubs are split into two groups; one with eight clubs and another with seven clubs.

=== Group A ===
Pos	Team	Pld	W	D	L	GF	GA	GD	Pts	Qualification
1	Libertas	20	13	6	1	36	13	+23	45	Qualification for the championship play–offs
2	La Fiorita	20	13	3	4	35	21	+14	42	Qualification for the championship play–offs and Europa League first qualifying round
3	Murata	20	11	3	6	31	19	+12	36	Qualification for the championship play–offs
4	Cailungo	20	6	5	9	30	37	−7	23	
5	Faetano	20	5	6	9	20	26	−6	21	
6	Juvenes/Dogana	20	5	3	12	24	36	−12	18	
7	Virtus	20	3	3	14	15	35	−20	12	

Source: fsgc.sm (in Italian), soccerway.com
Rules for classification: 1) points; 2) head-to-head points; 3) head-to-head goal difference; 4) head-to-head goals scored; 5) goal difference; 6) number of goals scored.

=== Group B ===
Pos	Team	Pld	W	D	L	GF	GA	GD	Pts	Qualification
1	Folgore	21	10	9	2	25	17	+8	39	Qualification for the championship play–offs
2	Tre Penne	21	11	2	8	24	18	+6	35 (Note: TPE 2–0 COS; COS 1–2 TPE)	Qualification for the championship play–offs
3	Cosmos	21	9	8	4	27	19	+8	35	Qualification for the championship play–offs
4	Fiorentino	21	7	8	6	36	25	+11	29	
5	San Giovanni	21	6	9	6	35	39	−4	27	
6	Domagnano	21	5	8	8	24	30	−6	23	
7	Pennarossa	21	5	5	11	23	38	−15	20	
8	Tre Fiori	21	5	2	14	22	34	−12	17	

Source: fsgc.sm (in Italian), soccerway.com
Rules for classification: 1) points; 2) head-to-head points; 3) head-to-head goal difference; 4) head-to-head goals scored; 5) goal difference; 6) number of goals scored.

== Results ==
All teams will play twice against the teams within their own group and once against the teams from the other group. This means that the clubs in the eight-club group will play 21 matches each while the clubs in the seven-club group will play 20 matches each during the regular season.

Home \ Away	CAI	COS	DOM	FAE	FIO	FOL	J/D	LFI	LIB	MUR	PEN	SGI	TFI	TPE	VIR
Cailungo		3–3		1–4			2–2	2–3	1–2	2–0	1–2	2–2			0–1
Cosmos			1–0		1–1	1–0	0–1		0–0			1–1	1–0	1–2	
Domagnano	0–1	0–2		0–0	2–2	2–2	2–1		1–1		0–0	2–1	3–0	0–0	
Faetano	0–2	0–0			1–1		2–4	1–2	0–3	1–2	2–1		2–0		1–0
Fiorentino	3–1	1–2	3–3			1–1			1–3	1–2	2–0	4–0	3–1	1–1	4–0
Folgore	0–0	1–0	0–0	2–1	1–1					1–0	1–0	2–0	0–3	1–0	3–1
Juvenes/Dogana	1–3			2–1	0–1	0–1		0–2		1–3	1–0			1–0	1–2
La Fiorita	3–0	0–2	3–2	1–1	2–1	0–0	2–1		0–1	1–0				3–1	2–1
Libertas	6–1			2–0		0–0	3–0	0–1		1–0	0–0	3–3			1–0
Murata	0–0	1–1	3–0	2–1			5–3	2–1	1–1					2–1	2–1
Pennarossa		0–1	2–3		1–4	2–2		2–4		0–5		3–5	1–0	2–0	
San Giovanni		3–3	3–1	1–1	1–1	3–3	4–3	2–1		1–0	1–1		1–2		
Tre Fiori	0–3	1–2	4–1		1–0	1–2	0–0	2–2	1–2	0–1	0–2	2–3		0–1	4–2
Tre Penne	1–0	2–0	1–0	0–1	1–0	1–2			1–3		4–1	2–0	2–0		1–0
Virtus	4–5	1–4	0–2				0–0	0–2	0–1	1–0	1–2	0–0			

Legend: Blue = home team win; Yellow = draw; Red = away team win.

== Season statistics ==
=== Top scorers ===
Rank	Player	Club	Goals
1	(Italy) Alberto Cannini	Tre Fiori	17
1	(Italy) Denis Iencinella	Fiorentino	17
3	(Brazil) Franklin	F.C. Domagnano	11
4	(Romania) Valentin Grigore	Cosmos	10
4	(San Marino) Marco Ugolini	San Giovanni	10
4	(Italy) Giorgio Mariotti	San Giovanni	10
7	(San Marino) Andrea Moroni	Faetano	9
7	(Tunisia) Adnan Rais	Murata	9
9	(San Marino) Marco Casadei	Murata	8
9	(San Marino) Enrico Cibelli	Tre Penne	8
9	(Italy) Omar Tomassoni	Pennarossa	8
9	(Italy) Nicoló Zennaro	Libertas	8

== Play-off ==
The play-off was held in a double-eliminination format. Both group winners (Libertas and Folgore) earned byes in the first and second round.

=== First round ===
6 May 2013
21:15

La Fiorita	1–1 (a.e.t.)	Cosmos
Rinaldi 93'		Lazzarini 92'
Penalties
	6–5

Campo di Fiorentino, Fiorentino

6 May 2013
21:15

Tre Penne	1–2 (a.e.t.)	Murata
Cibelli 67'		Protti 78'; Tellinai 95'

Campo sportivo di Fonte dell'Ovo, San Marino

=== Second round ===
10 May 2013
21:15

La Fiorita	1–1 (a.e.t.)	Murata
Aruta 78'		Casadei 90+1'
Penalties
	5–3

Campo sportivo di Fonte dell'Ovo, San Marino

11 May 2013
17:00

Cosmos	0–0 (a.e.t.)	Tre Penne
Penalties
	3–4

Campo di Fiorentino, Fiorentino

Cosmos is eliminated

=== Third round ===
13 May 2013
21:15

Libertas	2–0	Folgore
Fantini 64'; Morelli 83'

Campo sportivo di Fonte dell'Ovo, San Marino

14 May 2013
21:15

Tre Penne	2–0	Murata
Cardini 12'; Cibelli 60'

Campo sportivo di Fonte dell'Ovo, San Marino

Murata is eliminated

=== Fourth round ===
17 May 2013
21:15

Libertas	1–0	La Fiorita
Fantini 81'

Campo sportivo di Fonte dell'Ovo, San Marino

18 May 2013
17:00

Tre Penne	2–0	Folgore
Cibelli 81' (pen.); Valli 89'

Campo di Fiorentino, Fiorentino

Folgore is eliminated

=== Fifth round ===
23 May 2013
21:15

Tre Penne	1–0	La Fiorita
Mikhaylovsky 76'	Report

Campo sportivo di Fonte dell'Ovo, San Marino

La Fiorita is eliminated

=== Final ===
27 May 2013
21:15

Libertas	0–0 (a.e.t.)	Tre Penne
Penalties
	3–5

Stadio Olimpico, Serravalle
