= 2016–17 Campionato Sammarinese di Calcio =

Campionato Sammarinese di Calcio
- Season: 2016–17
- Champions: La Fiorita
- Champions League: La Fiorita
- Europa League: Tre Penne; Folgore
- Matches: 164
- Goals: 507 (3.09 per match)
- All statistics correct as of 20 May 2017.

The 2016–17 Campionato Sammarinese di Calcio season was the 32nd since its establishment. It is the only level in San Marino, in which all the country's 15 amateur football clubs play (there is no relegation). The season began on 9 September 2016 and ended with the play-off final on 20 May 2017. Tre Penne were the defending champions. The fixtures and group compositions were announced on 27 August 2016.

== Participating teams ==
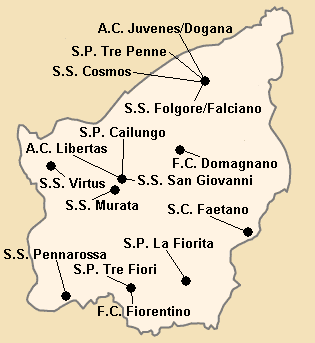
2016–17 Campionato Sammarinese di Calcio team distribution

Because there is no promotion or relegation in the league, the same 15 teams who competed in the league last season competed in the league this season.

- S.P. Cailungo (Borgo Maggiore)
- S.S. Cosmos (Serravalle)
- F.C. Domagnano (Domagnano)
- S.C. Faetano (Faetano)
- F.C. Fiorentino (Fiorentino)
- S.S. Folgore Falciano Calcio (Serravalle)
- A.C. Juvenes/Dogana (Serravalle)
- S.P. La Fiorita (Montegiardino)
- A.C. Libertas (Borgo Maggiore)
- S.S. Murata (San Marino)
- S.S. Pennarossa (Chiesanuova)
- S.S. San Giovanni (Borgo Maggiore)
- S.P. Tre Fiori (Fiorentino)
- S.P. Tre Penne (Serravalle)
- S.S. Virtus (Acquaviva)

== Regular season ==
The 15 clubs will be split into two groups; one with eight clubs and another with seven clubs.

=== Group A ===
Pos	Team	Pld	W	D	L	GF	GA	GD	Pts	Qualification
1	La Fiorita	20	14	2	4	51	22	+29	44	Qualification for the championship play–offs
2	Virtus	20	12	5	3	38	19	+19	41	Qualification for the championship play–offs
3	Juvenes/Dogana	20	8	7	5	27	22	+5	31	Qualification for the championship play–offs
4	Fiorentino	20	7	9	4	22	18	+4	30	
5	Cosmos	20	8	4	8	36	36	0	28	
6	Tre Fiori	20	6	4	10	31	41	−10	22	
7	Faetano	20	4	4	12	16	33	−17	16	

Source: UEFA, Soccerway
Rules for classification: 1) Points; 2) Head-to-head points; 3) Head-to-head goal difference; 4) Head-to-head goals scored; 5) Goal difference; 6) Goals scored.

=== Group B ===
Pos	Team	Pld	W	D	L	GF	GA	GD	Pts	Qualification
1	Libertas	21	14	5	2	37	13	+24	47	Qualification for the championship play–offs
2	Tre Penne	21	12	7	2	43	15	+28	43	Qualification for the championship play–offs and Europa League first qualifying round
3	Folgore	21	13	4	4	53	15	+38	43	Qualification for the championship play–offs
4	Domagnano	21	11	3	7	44	26	+18	36	
5	Murata	21	6	2	13	28	50	−22	20	
6	Pennarossa	21	2	4	15	23	61	−38	10	
7	Cailungo	21	2	3	16	20	52	−32	9	
8	San Giovanni	21	1	5	15	15	61	−46	8	

Source: UEFA, Soccerway
Rules for classification: 1) Points; 2) Head-to-head points; 3) Head-to-head goal difference; 4) Head-to-head goals scored; 5) Goal difference; 6) Goals scored.

== Results ==
All teams played twice against the teams within their own group and once against the teams from the other group. This meant that the clubs in the eight-club group played 21 matches each while the clubs in the seven-club group played 20 matches each during the regular season.

Home \ Away	CAI	COS	DOM	FAE	FIO	FOL	J/D	LFI	LIB	MUR	PEN	SGI	TFI	TPE	VIR
Cailungo	—	0–4	1–3	3–1	0–1	1–4	2–3	1–5	0–2	4–1	2–2	0–1	—	0–1	0–3
Cosmos	—	—	1–5	1–0	1–3	0–0	0–2	2–3	—	—	—	5–1	3–2	—	3–1
Domagnano	4–1	—	—	—	2–0	0–2	1–1	—	0–1	2–2	5–0	3–0	3–0	0–1	0–1
Faetano	—	3–1	0–3	—	0–1	—	1–3	1–0	1–2	—	4–2	—	1–1	0–0	1–2
Fiorentino	—	3–1	—	0–0	—	2–2	0–0	1–2	—	2–1	1–1	3–0	2–2	—	0–2
Folgore	7–0	—	4–0	3–0	—	—	0–1	—	1–2	5–0	3–0	6–1	—	0–1	—
Juvenes/Dogana	—	1–1	—	0–0	0–0	—	—	0–1	0–0	2–1	3–0	—	3–2	—	1–2
La Fiorita	—	3–3	3–0	2–0	1–2	2–1	2–1	—	0–2	—	—	4–0	3–2	0–2	1–1
Libertas	3–2	3–0	4–1	—	2–0	1–1	—	—	—	2–0	3–1	0–0	4–0	0–1	0–2
Murata	1–0	0–1	2–4	2–1	—	0–3	—	0–4	0–2	—	5–1	5–2	1–3	1–1	—
Pennarossa	1–1	0–5	1–4	—	—	0–1	—	1–4	1–2	2–3	—	2–2	—	1–7	—
San Giovanni	1–1	—	0–0	1–2	—	0–4	1–3	—	2–2	1–2	0–4	—	1–2	0–5	0–4
Tre Fiori	2–1	0–1	—	4–0	0–0	1–2	3–2	1–6	—	—	4–1	—	—	0–2	1–1
Tre Penne	2–0	5–2	1–4	—	1–1	2–2	0–0	—	0–0	6–0	0–2	4–1	—	—	1–1
Virtus	—	1–1	—	2–0	0–0	1–2	5–1	1–5	—	2–1	2–0	—	4–1	—	—

Source: UEFA
Legend: Blue = home team win; Yellow = draw; Red = away team win.

== Play-offs ==
The top three teams from each group advanced to a play-off which determined the season's champion and qualifiers for the 2017–18 UEFA Champions League and the 2017–18 UEFA Europa League.

The play-offs were played in a double-eliminination format with both group winners earning byes in the first and second round. All matches were decided over one leg with extra time and then penalties used to break ties.

The schedule was announced on 10 April 2017.

=== Bracket ===
First round
Match 1 – 29 April
Virtus	1
Folgore	2
Match 2 – 29 April
Tre Penne	2
Juvenes/Dogana	3

Second round
Match 3 – 3 May
Folgore (p)	0 (3)
Juvenes/Dogana	0 (0)
Match 4 – 5 May
Virtus	0
Tre Penne	1

Third round
Match 5 – 6 May
La Fiorita	1
Libertas	0
Match 6 – 9 May
Tre Penne	3
Juvenes/Dogana	1

Fourth round
Match 7 – 12 May
La Fiorita (a.e.t.)	2
Folgore	0
Match 8 – 13 May
Tre Penne	2
Libertas	0

Semi-final
Match 9 – 16 May
Tre Penne	1
Folgore	0

Final
Match 10 – 20 May
La Fiorita	2
Tre Penne	1

=== First round ===
29 April 2017
15:00 CEST

Virtus	1–2	Folgore
Armando 38'	Report	Perrotta 8'; Bezzi 60'

Campo sportivo di Fiorentino, Fiorentino
Referee: Luis Do Nascimento

29 April 2017
15:00 CEST

Tre Penne	2–3	Juvenes/Dogana
Simoncelli 11'; Gai 58'	Report	Santini 81'; Sorrentino 86', 89'

Campo sportivo di Fonte dell'Ovo, San Marino
Referee: Pedro Carvalho

=== Second round ===
3 May 2017
20:45 CEST

Folgore	0–0 (a.e.t.)	Juvenes/Dogana
	Report
Penalties
	3–0

Campo sportivo di Fonte dell'Ovo, San Marino
Referee: Michele Cruciani

5 May 2017
20:45 CEST

Virtus	0–1	Tre Penne
	Report	Fraternali 36'

Campo sportivo di Fonte dell'Ovo, San Marino
Referee: Raffaele Del Vecchio

Virtus eliminated.

=== Third round ===
6 May 2017
15:00 CEST

La Fiorita	1–0	Libertas
Martini 87'	Report

Campo sportivo di Fonte dell'Ovo, San Marino
Referee: Daniele D’Adamo

9 May 2017
20:45 CEST

Tre Penne	3–1	Juvenes/Dogana
Gai 71', 90+3'; Moretti 83'	Report	Cuttone 24'

Campo sportivo di Fonte dell'Ovo, San Marino
Referee: Michele Scarpino

Juvenes/Dogana eliminated.

=== Fourth round ===
12 May 2017
20:45 CEST

La Fiorita	2–0 (a.e.t.)	Folgore
Zafferani 103'; Gasperoni 105'	Report

Campo sportivo di Fonte dell'Ovo, San Marino
Referee: Marco Avoni

13 May 2017
15:00 CEST

Tre Penne	2–0	Libertas
Moretti 50'; Simoncelli 84' (pen.)	Report

Campo sportivo di Fonte dell'Ovo, San Marino

Libertas eliminated.

=== Semi-final ===
16 May 2017
20:45 CEST

Folgore	0–1	Tre Penne

Folgore eliminated and qualified for 2017–18 Europa League first qualifying round

=== Final ===
20 May 2017
20:45 CEST

La Fiorita	2–1 (a.e.t.)	Tre Penne

San Marino Stadium, Serravalle

La Fiorita qualified for 2017–18 Champions League first qualifying round and Tre Penne qualified for 2017–18 Europa League first qualifying round.
