= Football in San Marino =

- Country: San Marino
- Governing body: San Marino Football Federation
- National team: San Marino

Club competitions
- San Marino Championship

International competitions
- Champions League; Europa League; Conference League; Super Cup; FIFA Club World Cup; FIFA Intercontinental Cup; FIFA World Cup (national team); European Championship (national team); UEFA Nations League (national team)

Football is the most popular sport in San Marino, as well as in Italy, the country within which it is an enclave.

== Domestic football ==
The San Marino Championship, founded under the auspices of the FSGC (San Marino Football Federation), is the premier footballing competition in San Marino. 16 teams take part in the competition. In 2007, UEFA granted San Marino a spot in the 1st Qualifying Round of the Champions League. In 2007 league champion S.S. Murata was the first team to represent San Marino in the Champions League play-offs when they participated in the 2007–08 competition, losing to Finland's Tampere United.

San Marino also have a representative in the Italian system with Victor San Marino (formerly San Marino Calcio) playing in Italian football's Serie D. San Marino Calcio played their home matches at the Stadio Olimpico of Serravalle. They were founded as early as 1960, though at times have gone under different names and not been associated with the Sammarinese FA. They have returned as Victor San Marino after a 2-year absence in 2021.

San Marino also have two cup competitions in the country: Coppa Titano, founded in 1937, in which all the teams in the league compete, and the Super Coppa Sammarinese which is between the winner of the cup and the winner of the league.

=== Women's football ===
San Marino has no women's league, with them purely being represented in the Italian league system. This began as early as the 1980s, though the team only lasted 7 years and resulted in most of the players moving to play with Italian clubs. The FA attempted again in 2000, bringing together players for training and building up to entering the Italian league. As the project strengthened, they organised friendlies against Italian sides and in 2004-05 they would enter the Promozione, then called the Serie D, as San Marino Academy. For the first few years the team is predominantly Sammarinese and a national team is added to the long-term plans by the FA around 2013. Today, San Marino Academy continue to represent the nation in Italian women's football. They competed in the 2020–21 Serie A (women) for their first season in the top flight, but were relegated. The team are not listed as mainly Sammarinese anymore though, and no national side has formed as of 2022, the last in UEFA to do so. Problems of dual nationality have also struck, with Chiara Beccari being capped for the Italian U-19 team.

== League system 2025–26 ==
Level	Leagues/Divisions
1	Campionato Sammarinese di Calcio; 16 clubs

== International football ==
The San Marino national team played its first unofficial international match in 1986, achieving a result of 0–1 against the Canadian Olympic team. San Marino's first competitive game was on 14 November 1990, scoring 0–4 against Switzerland in the European Championship qualifier. San Marino have participated in the qualifiers of every European Championship and World Cup, but have not won a match in either.

San Marino faced England in a World Cup qualifier on 17 November 1993. San Marino took the lead through Davide Gualtieri after 8.3 seconds - the fastest goal in World Cup qualifier competition against a side who had previously qualified. San Marino was placed third at international level where they achieved 7–1.

The team drew against Turkey and Latvia, after an international career that had seen them experience 70 defeats. On 29 April 2004, San Marino recorded their first win, 1–0 against Liechtenstein in an international friendly. Andy Selva scored the only goal.

On 6 September 2006, San Marino lost 13–0 to Germany at the Stadio Olimpico, one of the largest goal margin defeats in the European Championship. During this same competition, on 7 February 2007, San Marino were close to drawing with the Republic of Ireland, Stephen Ireland had scored in the 94th minute, within 8 seconds of the final whistle which resulted in them staining a 1-1. The goal scored by San Marino was their first in a European Championship qualifier since scoring 4–1 to Austria in 1998.

San Marino are as of December 2024 placed bottom in the FIFA World Rankings at 210th. On 10 September 2013, Alessandro Della Valle scored an equaliser in a 5–1 loss against Poland. It was the first time in five years that they had scored a goal in competitive matches.

Key San Marino players in the past have included Massimo Bonini, a midfielder who played for the national team as well as Italy's Juventus FC from 1981 to 1988. Andy Selva is the national team's top scorer with eight goals.

On 4 September 2024, San Marino won 1–0 against Liechtenstein in the Nations League D, winning their first competitive game, their first win in 20 years, and their second win on record.

On 18 November 2024, San Marino recorded their biggest ever win and their first away win in their history, a 3–1 win against Liechtenstein which secured promotion to the Nations League C.

== Football stadiums in San Marino ==
Stadium	Capacity	City	Image
Stadio Olimpico di San Marino	4,798	Serravalle	

== Attendances ==
The football club from San Marino with the highest average home attendance per league season:

Season	Club	Average
2014-15	San Marino Calcio	303
2013-14	San Marino Calcio	317
2012-13	San Marino Calcio	484

== See also ==
- Lists of stadiums
