= Damiano Vannucci =

Sammarinese footballer

Personal information
- Full name: Damiano Vannucci
- Date of birth: 30 July 1977 (age 49)
- Place of birth: San Marino
- Position: Midfielder

Senior career*
Years	Team	Apps	(Gls)
- S.S. Virtus
2004–2005	A.C. Juvenes/Dogana	27	(3)
2005–2008	A.C. Libertas	6	(0)
2008–2011	Perticala Calcio		
2011–2013	S.P. La Fiorita	39	(2)
2013–2014	S.S. Folgore Falciano Calcio	22	(1)
Total		94	(6)

International career
1996–2012	San Marino	69	(0)
- * Club domestic league appearances and goals as of 18 July 2020

Damiano Vannucci (born 30 July 1977 in San Marino) is a retired San Marinese footballer who played as a midfielder. He had been capped a then-record 69 times for the San Marino national team, beating Mirco Gennari's record of 48, but was surpassed by Andy Selva in 2015.

== Career statistics ==
=== International ===
Appearances and goals by national team and year
National team	Year	Apps	Goals
San Marino	1996	1	0
San Marino	1997	4	0
San Marino	1998	–	
San Marino	1999	3	0
San Marino	2000	–	
San Marino	2001	5	0
San Marino	2002	4	0
San Marino	2003	6	0
San Marino	2004	5	0
San Marino	2005	5	0
San Marino	2006	4	0
San Marino	2007	8	0
San Marino	2008	4	0
San Marino	2009	5	0
San Marino	2010	5	0
San Marino	2011	6	0
San Marino	2012	4	0
Total		69	0
