= Campionato Sammarinese =

Football league in San Marino

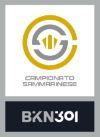
- Founded: 2 October 1977; 49 years ago
- Country: San Marino
- Confederation: UEFA (Europe)
- Number of clubs: 16
- Level on pyramid: 1
- Domestic cup(s): Coppa Titano; Super Coppa Sammarinese
- International cup(s): UEFA Champions League; UEFA Conference League
- Current champions: S.P. Tre Fiori (9th title) (2025–26)
- Most championships: S.P. Tre Fiori (9)
- Top scorer: Imre Badalassi (134 goals)
- Broadcaster: San Marino RTV
- Website: Website
- Current: 2025–26 Campionato Sammarinese di Calcio

Campionato Sammarinese di Calcio (English translation: Sammarinese Football Championship) is the highest competition for football clubs located at the only level of the Sammarinese football league system (no relegation system exists) and has been operating since the 1985–1986 season. As of 2025, Campionato Sammarinese di Calcio is ranked last (55th) among European leagues according to UEFA's league coefficient, which was based on the performance of Sammarinese clubs in the Champions League, Europa League and the Conference League.

== Rules ==
Until 1996, the league had two levels, Serie A1 and Serie A2, and a relegation/promotion system. However, the teams promoted from the second level could also participate in the championship play-off against Serie A1's first teams. All the clubs play at the same level since then. Before 2018–2019 season, they were split into two divisions called Girone (or "Groups"). The teams played home and away matches in their girone and once against the teams from the other girone. The first three teams in each girone entered a double-elimination play-off tournament, which was the only seen in association football world, to decide the championship winners, who qualified for the UEFA Champions League preliminary phase.

In the 2018–2019 season, the rules changed. All the clubs were still split into two girone. The teams played once against the other teams in the same girone. The top four teams in each girone proceeded to group 1 in the second stage, while the others proceeded to group 2. Teams played twice against each team in the same group. The second and the third team in group 2 proceeded to the play-off. The winner of the play-off, the top team in group 2 and the top 6 teams in group 1 proceeded to the final stage. The championship winner qualified for the UEFA Champions League preliminary phase and the first runner-up qualified for the Europa League preliminary phase.

In the 2020–2021 season, a new format was applied. Now, all the teams play in the same league and play each other twice. At the end of the regular season, the top twelve teams proceed to the play-off tournament, deciding the winner who qualifies for the UEFA Champions League preliminary phase, and the loser of the final for the Conference League preliminary phase.

In the 2023–24 season, the double-round robin format remained, but the play-offs and final were discontinued for the first time in the competition's history. This time round, the team top of the table after every team has played each other twice, are awarded the title thus keeping in line with the majority of most European leagues.

The domestic cup winners qualify for the Conference League preliminary phase.

== Stadiums ==
Skilled Sammarinese stadiums.

Sammarinese teams do not have home grounds of their own. Instead, the following venues are randomly chosen for every match:

Stadium	Capacity	City	UEFA Category
San Marino Stadium	6,664	Serravalle	3/4 stars
Stadio di Dogana Ezio Conti	1,200	Dogana	1/4 stars
Stadio di Acquaviva	730	Acquaviva	—N/a
Stadio di Fiorentino	700	Fiorentino	—N/a
Stadio di Montecchio	600	San Marino	—N/a
Campo Sportivo di Domagnano	500	Domagnano	—N/a
Campo Sportivo di Montegiardino	500	Montegiardino	—N/a
Stadio Serravalle B	500	Serravalle	—N/a

Since there are not many grounds, matches are played on two days of each week, usually Saturday and Sunday. The play-off finals and the European fixtures are mainly played in the San Marino Stadium or, for the early stages and for matches with expected low attendances, at the recently restructured and expanded Stadio di Acquaviva (formerly called Campo Sportivo di Acquaviva). The Stadio Serravalle B is undergoing renovetions in order to comply with UEFA minimum requirements.

== Teams ==
There are 16 teams in championship.

Locations of the Campionato Sammarinese di Calcio teams

Team	City
Cailungo	Cailungo
Cosmos	Serravalle
Domagnano	Domagnano
Faetano	Faetano
Fiorentino	Fiorentino
Folgore	Falciano
Juvenes/Dogana	Serravalle
La Fiorita	Montegiardino
Libertas	Borgo Maggiore
Murata	Murata
Pennarossa	Chiesanuova
San Giovanni	San Giovanni sotto le Penne
San Marino Academy U22	San Marino
Tre Fiori	Fiorentino
Tre Penne	San Marino
Virtus	Acquaviva

== Champions ==
=== Winners by season ===
Season	Winners	Runners-up
1985–86	Faetano	San Giovanni
1986–87	La Fiorita	Faetano
1987–88	Tre Fiori	Virtus
1988–89	Domagnano	La Fiorita
1989–90	La Fiorita	Cosmos
1990–91	Faetano	Tre Fiori
1991–92	Montevito	Libertas
1992–93	Tre Fiori	Domagnano
1993–94	Tre Fiori	La Fiorita
1994–95	Tre Fiori	La Fiorita
1995–96	Libertas	Cosmos
1996–97	Folgore/Falciano	La Fiorita
1997–98	Folgore/Falciano	Tre Fiori
1998–99	Faetano	Folgore/Falciano
1999–2000	Folgore/Falciano	Domagnano
2000–01	Cosmos	Folgore/Falciano
2001–02	Domagnano	Cailungo
2002–03	Domagnano	Pennarossa
2003–04	Pennarossa	Domagnano
2004–05	Domagnano	Murata
2005–06	Murata	Pennarossa
2006–07	Murata	Tre Fiori
2007–08	Murata	Juvenes/Dogana
2008–09	Tre Fiori	Juvenes/Dogana
2009–10	Tre Fiori	Tre Penne
2010–11	Tre Fiori	Tre Penne
2011–12	Tre Penne	Libertas
2012–13	Tre Penne	Libertas
2013–14	La Fiorita	Folgore/Falciano
2014–15	Folgore/Falciano	Juvenes/Dogana
2015–16	Tre Penne	La Fiorita
2016–17	La Fiorita	Tre Penne
2017–18	La Fiorita	Folgore/Falciano
2018–19	Tre Penne	La Fiorita
2019–20	Tre Fiori (Note: The 2019–20 season was abandoned due to the COVID-19 pandemic. Tre Fiori, with the highest points obtained before the suspension, was crowned champions and qualified for the UEFA Champions League.)	Folgore/Falciano
2020–21	Folgore/Falciano	La Fiorita
2021–22	La Fiorita	Tre Penne
2022–23	Tre Penne	Cosmos
2023–24	Virtus	La Fiorita
2024–25	Virtus	La Fiorita
2025–26	Tre Fiori	Virtus

=== Titles by team ===
Club	Titles	Runners-up
Tre Fiori	9	3
La Fiorita	6	9
Folgore/Falciano	7	7
Tre Penne	5	4
Domagnano	5	3
Faetano	3	2
Murata	3	1
Virtus	3	2
Libertas	2	4
Cosmos	3	3
Pennarossa	1	2
Montevito	1	0
Juvenes/Dogana	0	3
San Giovanni	0	1
Cailungo	0	4

== Top scorers ==
Year	Top scorer	Team	Goals
1997–98	(San Marino) Damiano Vannucci	Virtus	21
2003–04	(San Marino) Damiano Vannucci	Virtus	15
2004–05	(Italy) Matteo Pazzaglia	Montevito	19
2009–10	(Italy) Simon Parma	La Fiorita	13
2010–11	(San Marino) Adolfo Hirsch (San Marino) Marco Fantini (Italy) Roberto Gatti (Italy) Alessandro Giunta (Italy) Francesco Viroli	Virtus; Juvenes/Dogana; Murata; Tre Fiori; Faetano	12
2011–12	(Italy) Cristian Rubén Menin (Italy) Simon Parma	Cosmos; La Fiorita	11
2012–13	(San Marino) Alberto Cannini (Italy) Denis Iencinella	Tre Fiori; Fiorentino	17
2013–14	(Romania) Valentin Grigore (Italy) Giacomo Gualtieri	Cosmos; La Fiorita	18
2014–15	(Italy) Daniele Friguglietti	San Giovanni	16
2015–16	(Italy) Marco Martini	La Fiorita	20
2016–17	(Italy) Marco Martini	La Fiorita	27
2017–18	(Italy) Imre Badalassi	Tre Fiori	20
2018–19	(Italy) Andrea Compagno	Tre Fiori	22
2019–20	(Italy) Eric Fedeli	Murata	16
2020–21	(Italy) Imre Badalassi	Folgore	13
2021–22	(Italy) Imre Badalassi	Tre Penne	24
2022–23	(Italy) Matteo Prandelli	Cosmos	21
2023–24	(Italy) Imre Badalassi	Tre Penne	30
2024–25	(Italy) Matteo Prandelli	Tre Fiori	21

Most time goalscorers

- 4 times:
  - Imre Badalassi (2017–18, 2020–21, 2021–22, 2023–24)

Most goals by a player in a single season

- 30 goals.
  - Imre Badalassi (2023–24)

== See also ==
- List of association football competitions
