= Andy Selva =

Sammarinese football manager and former player (born 1976)

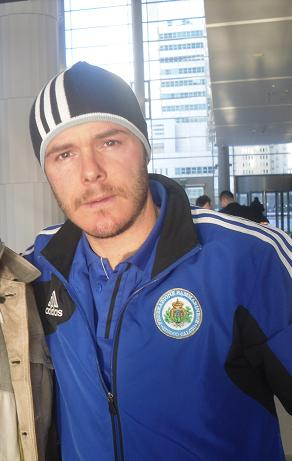
- Selva in 2013

Personal information
- Full name: Andy Selva
- Date of birth: 23 May 1976 (age 50)
- Place of birth: Rome, Italy
- Height: 1.76 m (5 ft 9 in)
- Position: Striker

Team information
- Current team: Cosmos (manager)

Senior career*
Years	Team	Apps	(Gls)
1994–1995	Latina	26	(5)
1995–1996	Civita Castellana	31	(16)
1996–1998	Fano	32	(1)
1998–1999	Catanzaro	40	(6)
1999–2000	Tivoli	21	(15)
2000–2001	San Marino	29	(4)
2001–2002	Maceratese	5	(1)
2002	→ Grosseto (loan)	15	(2)
2002–2003	Bellaria	30	(21)
2003–2005	SPAL 1907	51	(22)
2005–2006	Padova	20	(2)
2006–2009	Sassuolo	59	(23)
2009–2011	Verona	29	(8)
2011–2013	Fidene	26	(6)
2013	La Fiorita	3	(2)
2013–2014	Anziolavinio	6	(1)
2014–2018	La Fiorita	68	(36)
Total		491	(165)

International career
1997	San Marino U21	1	(1)
1998–2016	San Marino	73	(8)

Managerial career
- 2018–2019: San Marino U17
- 2020–2022: Pennarossa
- 2022–2024: Tre Fiori
- 2025–: Cosmos
- * Club domestic league appearances and goals

Andy Selva (born 23 May 1976) is a Sammarinese former footballer who is currently the manager of Campionato Sammarinese club Cosmos. During his playing career he played as a forward and captained the San Marino national team, finishing his career as their record goal scorer.

== Club career ==
He began his career in 1994–95, playing in the Eccellenza with A.S. Latina, in which he scored five goals in 26 appearances. The following season, he produced 10 goals in 31 appearances in Civita Castellana in Serie D, before moving to Fano (Serie C2), where he remained until March 1998, he played 32 games with only one goal. In 1999, Selva played with another Serie C2 club, Catanzaro, making 40 appearances, scoring six goals.

Selva went back to the Eccellenza with Tivoli in 1999, which he scored 15 goals in 21 matches, while for the following season, he moved to San Marino, where he scored four goals in 26 appearances. In the 2001–02 season playing in three different teams, he collected three appearances with San Marino, then five with Maceratese in Serie D, scoring a goal, and thus finishing the season in Serie D, with Grosseto (15 appearances and two goals). He scored 21 goals in 30 games for Bellaria in the following season.

In the summer of 2003, he transferred to SPAL 1907 where, in two seasons in Serie C1 he plays 51 games scoring 22 goals. In 2005–06, he moved to Padova (Serie C1), who sold him to Sassuolo after only scoring two goals in 20 games. With Sassuolo, he played two years in Serie C1 and played an important part in the historic breakthrough with a Serie B promotion, contributing decisively with 11 goals in and became the top scorer in Group A.

In mid-2009, he left for Hellas Verona but was released after Verona were promoted to Serie B.

In July 2011, he trained with Santarcangelo.

He announced his retirement as a player in July 2018.

== International career ==
Selva was born in Rome, Italy to an Italian father from Lazio and a Sammarinese mother, which made him eligible to represent Italy or San Marino and he chose for the latter.

He made his international debut on 9 September 1997 against Turkey U-21, and scored one goal for his team in 1–4 loss.

As one of the few professional practitioners of the sport in the country, he is hailed one of the greatest players in the history of the San Marino national side. He appeared 73 times for the national team and scored eight goals, making him the leading goalscorer in the history of the team. Until 2012, he was the only player to score more than one goal for San Marino.

On 28 April 2004, Selva became the first player ever to score a winning goal for San Marino when he netted the only goal in a 1–0 friendly win over Liechtenstein, which was the only win that San Marino recorded until they again beat Liechtenstein on 5 September 2024. The game is also one of eight official matches where San Marino have kept a clean sheet.

== Managerial career ==
=== San Marino U17 ===
After his retirement, he was announced as the head coach of San Marino national under-17 football team.

=== Pennarossa ===
In February 2020, he was appointed as manager of Campionato Sammarinese side Pennarossa.

=== Tre Fiori ===
On 13 June 2022, he was appointed as head coach of Sammarinese team Tre Fiori. On 7 July 2022, he led the team to their first ever away win in a European competition (and the first of any Sammarinese team), with a 1–0 win over Luxembourgish team Fola Esch. A week later, Tre Fiori beat Fola Esch 3–1 in the return leg, resulting in them qualifying for the 2nd qualifying round of the UEFA Europa Conference League for the first time, and advancing in a European competition for only the second time ever.

Andy Selva announced his resignation on 24 April 2023 and was replaced by Danilo Girolomoni.

=== Cosmos ===
On 14 January 2025, he was appointed as manager of Campionato Sammarinese side Cosmos on a six-month deal.

== Career statistics ==
=== Club ===
Appearances and goals by club, season and competition
Club	Season	League			National cup		Europe		Other		Total	
Club	Season	Division	Apps	Goals	Apps	Goals	Apps	Goals	Apps	Goals	Apps	Goals

=== International ===
As of match played 11 October 2016.

Appearances and goals by national team and year
National team	Year	Apps	Goals
San Marino	1998	2	1
San Marino	1999	4	0
San Marino	2000	2	0
San Marino	2001	6	2
San Marino	2002	4	0
San Marino	2003	4	0
San Marino	2004	2	1
San Marino	2005	5	2
San Marino	2006	4	0
San Marino	2007	7	1
San Marino	2008	3	1
San Marino	2009	4	0
San Marino	2010	3	0
San Marino	2011	6	0
San Marino	2012	2	0
San Marino	2013	5	0
San Marino	2014	4	0
San Marino	2015	5	0
San Marino	2016	1	0
Total		73	8

Score and Result lists San Marino's goals first.

No.	Date	Venue	Opponent	Score	Result	Competition
1	10 October 1998	Stadio Olimpico, Serravalle, San Marino	Austria	1–4	1–4	UEFA Euro 2000 qualifying
2	28 February 2001	King Baudouin Stadium, Brussels, Belgium	Belgium	1–10	1–10	2002 FIFA World Cup qualification
3	6 June 2001	Stadio Olimpico, Serravalle, San Marino	Belgium	1–1	1–4	2002 FIFA World Cup qualification
4	28 April 2004	Stadio Olimpico, Serravalle, San Marino	Liechtenstein	1–0	1–0	Friendly
5	30 March 2005	Stadio Olimpico, Serravalle, San Marino	Belgium	1–1	1–2	2006 FIFA World Cup qualification
6	4 June 2005	Stadio Olimpico, Serravalle, San Marino	Bosnia and Herzegovina	1–2	1–3	2006 FIFA World Cup qualification
7	17 October 2007	Stadio Olimpico, Serravalle, San Marino	Wales	1–2	1–2	UEFA Euro 2008 qualifying
8	11 October 2008	Stadio Olimpico, Serravalle, San Marino	Slovakia	1–2	1–3	2010 FIFA World Cup qualification

== Honours ==
Sassuolo

- Serie C1: 2007–08
- Supercoppa di Serie C: 2008

SP La Fiorita

- Campionato Sammarinese di Calcio: 2016–17, 2017–18
- Coppa Titano: 2012–13, 2015–16, 2017–18
