= San Marino Football Federation =

Sport governing body in San Marino

UEFA
- Founded: 1931
- FIFA affiliation: 1988
- UEFA affiliation: 1988
- President: Marco Tura
- Website: https://www.fsgc.sm

The San Marino Football Federation (FSGC; Italian: Federazione Sammarinese Giuoco Calcio) is the governing body of football in San Marino. It organizes the San Marino football league (Campionato Sammarinese), a national cup (Coppa Titano), a super cup (Trofeo Federale) and the San Marino national football team. It is based in the city of San Marino. As of 27 September 2026, the FIFA committee recognises San Marino as the lowest-ranking team according to the FIFA World Rankings.

The FSGC also helped to create the original incarnation of A.S.D. Victor San Marino, a team that plays in Serie D, the fourth division of the Italian league.
