= FC Domagnano =

Sanmarinese football club

Domagnano
- Full name: Football Club Domagnano
- Founded: 1966
- Ground: Campo sportivo di Domagnano
- Capacity: 500
- Chairman: Claudio Muccioli
- Manager: Paolo Rossi
- League: Campionato Sammarinese di Calcio
- 2025–26: Campionato Sammarinese di Calcio, 6th of 16
- Website: https://www.fcdomagnano.com/
Home colours	Away colours

Football Club Domagnano, commonly referred to as FC Domagnano or simply Domagnano, is a Sanmarinese football club, based in Domagnano. The club was founded in 1966. Domagnano currently plays in Campionato Sammarinese di Calcio. The team's colors are red and yellow. Previously known as SP Domagnano, the side has been one of the most successful teams in the Campionato Sammarinese. In the 2004–05 season, Domagnano won the championship with a play-off win over S.S. Murata. As the Sammarinese champions, Domagnano entered the UEFA Cup but was defeated easily in the first qualifying round. Some of Domagnano's rivals are S.S. Pennarossa and A.C. Libertas.

== Current squad ==
As of 4 February 2026

Note: Flags indicate national team as defined under FIFA eligibility rules; some limited exceptions apply. Players may hold more than one non-FIFA nationality.

No.	Pos.	Nation	Player
1	GK	ITA	Alessandro Maggioli
2	DF	ITA	Filippo Baffoni
4	MF	ITA	Mattia Fusco
5	MF	ALB	Samel Gjorretaj
6	DF	SMR	Filippo Valentini
7	MF	SMR	Tommaso Famiglietti
8	MF	ITA	Giacomo Buda
9	FW	SMR	Daniele Babboni
10	FW	SMR	Simone Santi
11	FW	ITA	Matthias Bonetti
14	FW	ITA	Matteo Sapucci
17	FW	ITA	Nicolas Ferraro
18	DF	ITA	Manuel Maggioli
19	MF	ITA	Lorenzo Contadini

No.	Pos.	Nation	Player
21	FW	ITA	Mattia Amati
22	MF	ITA	Enrico Gozzi
23	DF	ITA	Pietro Mengucci
24	FW	SMR	Pietro Sopranzi
25	MF	ITA	Giacomo Greco
27	DF	ITA	Diego Perazzini
30	GK	SMR	Andrea Gregori
31	MF	SMR	Simone Nanni
32	GK	ITA	Filippo Papi
33	DF	ITA	Samuele Marconi
41	DF	ITA	Filippo Guglielmi
42	FW	ITA	Lorenzo Fortunato
77	DF	ITA	Mattia Ventrucci

== Achievements ==
- Campionato Sammarinese di Calcio:
  - Winners: 1988–89, 2001–02, 2002–03, 2004–05
- Coppa Titano:
  - Winners: 1972, 1988, 1990, 1992, 1996, 2001, 2002, 2003
- San Marino Federal Trophy:
  - Winners: 1990, 2001, 2004

== European record ==
Season	Competition	Round	Club	Home	Away	Agg.
2002-03	2002-03 UEFA Cup	QR	(Czech Republic) Viktoria Žižkov	0–2	0–3	0–5
2003-04	2003-04 UEFA Cup	QR	(Russia) Torpedo Moscow	0–4	0–5	0–9
2005-06	2005-06 UEFA Cup	1QR	(Slovenia) Domžale	0–5	0–3	0–8
