= AS San Giovanni =

Sanmarinese football club

San Giovanni
- Full name: Associazione Sportiva San Giovanni
- Founded: 1948
- Ground: Stadio Borgo Maggiore
- Capacity: 1,000
- Chairman: Venturi Massimiliano
- Manager: Marco Tognacci
- League: Campionato Sammarinese di Calcio
- 2025–26: Campionato Sammarinese di Calcio, 12th of 16
- Website: https://sangiovannicalcio.com/
Home colours	Away colours

A.S. San Giovanni is a Sanmarinese football club, based in San Giovanni sotto le Penne, a civil parish of Borgo Maggiore. The club was founded in 1948. San Giovanni currently plays in Campionato Sammarinese di Calcio. The team's colors are white, red and black. It is the only Sammarinese side not to win any top tier silverware, as they were Serie A2 champions in the 1994–95 season, when there was a promotion/relegation pyramid of two tiers.

== History ==
In the early years of the Second World War, the parish priest of St. John Sotto Le Pen, a hamlet of Borgo Maggiore, collects the children of the country, regarded as the 10th Castello della Repubblica.

Behind the church there is a bumpy pitch, the parish priest puts it at the disposal of the boys provided that they commit themselves to make it fit for use. In the evening, instead of being at the bar all to the field to work in the light of a bulb improvised. Meanwhile, Don Fedele is at pains to find T-shirts, the first will be red and black, and have since remained the same, the colors. In 1948 was founded the St. John that with the early 1950s, such as Libertas, boasts its own pitch built by the founders behind the church. A special feature is the management of self-sufficient players, the San Giovanni is born with all the original players of the homonymous village of Borgo Maggiore. The player who most remember is John the Baptist War, who later became President of the SAA. The coat of arms combines social tradition to the imagination like few others. Divided into 2 distinct parts, the top are well in sight of the "Three Feathers" calling the St. John under the pen (the three peaks of Monte Titano), in fact, appears on the underside of a mountain lion standing guard at a ball . Coat of arms, too, the result of the work and imagination of its founders. In the second half of the 1950s there is a disruption that will only last a couple of seasons, in fact in 1957 the St. John makes his return to the field for him no matter what.

== Current squad ==
As of 4 February 2025.

Note: Flags indicate national team as defined under FIFA eligibility rules; some limited exceptions apply. Players may hold more than one non-FIFA nationality.

No.	Pos.	Nation	Player
2	DF	ITA	Luca Frattici
3	DF	ITA	Luca Tiraferri
4	DF	SMR	Alessandro Giambalvo
5	DF	ITA	Federico Vandi
6	DF	ARG	Santiago Tomas Calp
9	FW	ITA	Gianluca Romano
10	FW	ITA	Eric D'Angeli
12	GK	SMR	Andrea Conti
14	MF	UKR	Oleh Ankotovych
16	MF	ITA	Andrea Corinti
17	DF	SMR	Alex Caddy

No.	Pos.	Nation	Player
18	FW	SMR	Federico Tumidei
19	FW	ITA	Tommaso Bastianelli
21	MF	ITA	Nicholas Lisi
22	DF	ITA	Diego Fabbri
23	MF	ITA	Francesco Pari
26	DF	ARG	Gino Meriano
30	MF	ITA	Antonio Palumbo
44	GK	ITA	Alessandro Casadei
47	MF	ITA	Gianluca Bianchi
99	FW	ITA	Mattia Zanni

== Achievements ==
- Campionato Sammarinese di Calcio:
  - Runner-up: 1985–86
- Coppa Titano:
  - Runner-up: 2012–13
