= Montegiardino =

Castello of San Marino

Montegiardino Munt Giardêin (Romagnol)
- Castello
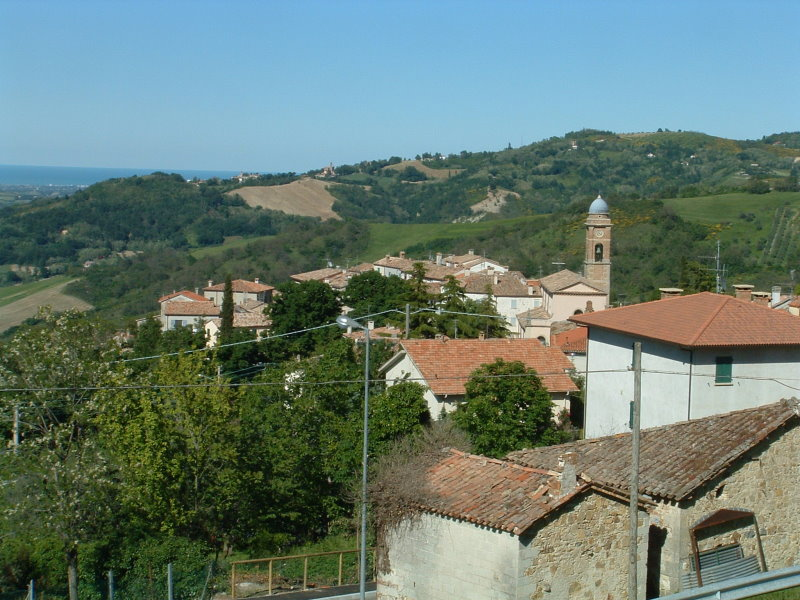
- Panoramic view over Montegiardino

- Flag Coat of arms

- Location of Montegiardino in San Marino

- Location within San Marino
- Coordinates: 43°54′32″N 12°29′04″E
- Country: San Marino
- Curazie: List: Cerbaiola

Government
  - Capitano: Giacomo Rinaldi (Insieme per Montegiardino/PDCS; since 2014)

Area
  - Total: 3.31 km^{2} (1.28 sq mi)
- Elevation: 340 m (1,120 ft)

Population (January 2025)
  - Total: 1,004
- Time zone: UTC+1 (CET)
  - Summer (DST): CEST
- Postal code: 47898
- Climate: Cfa
- Website: gov.sm

Montegiardino (lit. 'Mountain garden'; Romagnol: Munt Giardêin) is one of the nine castelli of San Marino. It occupies an area of 3.31 km^{2} (1.28 sq mi) and is the smallest castello in the country by both land area and population. As of 2023, it had a population of 1,015 inhabitants.

== History ==
The territory of San Marino consisted only of Mount Titano until 1463. The nation became part of an alliance against Sigismondo Pandolfo Malatesta, the Lord of Rimini, who was defeated. The Pope Pius II gave the towns of Fiorentino, Montegiardino, and Serravalle to San Marino as a reward for being part of the alliance. Later, Faetano voluntarily joined the country, and the boundaries have remained the same ever since. The people of San Marino besieged the castle walls of Montegiardino to wrest it from Malatesta's army. The siege continued for a long time, until it was eventually dismantled under the orders of Federico da Montefeltro. It was only recovered almost two centuries later in 1647 by the nearby church. The coat of arms of Montegiardino consists of a traditional blue colored shield with curved lower border, and a yellow trimontium with three red flowers with stems and two green leaves.

== Geography ==
The country of San Marino is divided into nine municipalities (castelli) for administration. With a land area of 3.31 km^{2} (1.28 sq mi), Montegiardino is the smallest castello in the country and the smallest top-level country subdivision in the world by area. The region had a population of 967 inhabitants in 2018, which increased to 1,004 in January 2025. It is the smallest subdivision of the country by population. It borders the San Marino municipalities Fiorentino and Faetano and the Italian municipalities Monte Grimano and Sassofeltrio.

Montegiardino is sub-divided into one curazia amongst the 44 secondary sub-divisions of the country. Cerbaiola the only curazia in the castello. Montegiardino is home to some of the departments of the University of the Republic of San Marino, the country's only university. Antica Locanda Modà inside Palazzo Mengozzi, a 17th-century building decorated by Gerolamo Mengozzi Colonna and classified as a national heritage site by the local government is present in the region.

=== Climate ===
Montegiardino has a humid subtropical climate (Köppen: Cfa).

Climate data for Montegiardino
Month	Jan	Feb	Mar	Apr	May	Jun	Jul	Aug	Sep	Oct	Nov	Dec	Year
Mean daily maximum °C (°F)	8.7 (47.7)	10.0 (50.0)	13.0 (55.4)	16.4 (61.5)	21.0 (69.8)	25.9 (78.6)	28.5 (83.3)	28.2 (82.8)	23.6 (74.5)	19.2 (66.6)	14.0 (57.2)	9.9 (49.8)	18.2 (64.8)
Daily mean °C (°F)	6.0 (42.8)	6.9 (44.4)	9.8 (49.6)	13.1 (55.6)	17.7 (63.9)	22.4 (72.3)	24.9 (76.8)	24.4 (75.9)	20.1 (68.2)	16.0 (60.8)	11.3 (52.3)	7.3 (45.1)	15.0 (59.0)
Mean daily minimum °C (°F)	3.7 (38.7)	4.2 (39.6)	6.7 (44.1)	9.8 (49.6)	14.2 (57.6)	18.6 (65.5)	20.9 (69.6)	20.7 (69.3)	16.8 (62.2)	13.2 (55.8)	9.0 (48.2)	5.0 (41.0)	11.9 (53.4)
Average precipitation mm (inches)	57.1 (2.25)	65.9 (2.59)	66.0 (2.60)	64.5 (2.54)	69.7 (2.74)	42.0 (1.65)	37.2 (1.46)	49.1 (1.93)	77.0 (3.03)	81.2 (3.20)	84.8 (3.34)	72.5 (2.85)	767 (30.18)
Source: Weather.Directory

== International relations ==
Montegiardino is twinned with:

- Bléré, France (since 2017)
