= SP Cailungo =

Sanmarinese football club

Cailungo
- Full name: Società Polisportiva Cailungo
- Founded: 1974
- Ground: Campo Sportivo di Domagnano
- Capacity: 500
- Chairman: Paolo Rondelli
- Manager: Francesco Benedetti
- League: Campionato Sammarinese di Calcio
- 2025–26: Campionato Sammarinese di Calcio, 15th of 16
Home colours	Away colours

S.P. Cailungo is a Sanmarinese football club, based in Cailungo, a civil parish of Borgo Maggiore. The club was founded in 1974. Cailungo currently plays in Girone A of Campionato Sammarinese di Calcio. The team's colors are red and green.

== Achievements ==
- San Marino Federal Trophy: 1

2002

== Current squad ==
As of 20 January 2026

Note: Flags indicate national team as defined under FIFA eligibility rules; some limited exceptions apply. Players may hold more than one non-FIFA nationality.

No.	Pos.	Nation	Player
3	DF	MAR	Eddine Ir Nasr
4	MF	ITA	Davide Montalti
6	DF	ITA	Domenico Guglione
8	MF	ARG	Matias Colagiovanni
9	FW	ITA	Antonio Bua
10	FW	SMR	Adolfo Hirsch
11	GK	ITA	Alberto Gallinetta
12	MF	ITA	Alessandro Conti
15	MF	SMR	Thomas Rastelli
17	FW	ITA	Riccardo Michelucci
18	GK	SMR	Massimo Francioni

No.	Pos.	Nation	Player
19	MF	SMR	Pietro Codispoti
20	MF	ITA	Kevin De Luca
21	MF	ITA	Davide Lisi
23	DF	ITA	Manuel Iuzzolino
26	MF	ITA	Samuel Adu Boateng
27	MF	SMR	Mattia Sarti
28	MF	ITA	Lorenzo Persichilli
40	DF	SMR	Filippo Quaranta
73	DF	ITA	Samuele Fratti
