= SC Faetano =

Sanmarinese football club

Faetano
- Full name: Società Calcio Faetano
- Founded: 1962
- Ground: Campo Sportivo Guido Della Valle
- Capacity: 500
- Chairman: Fabio Gasperoni
- Manager: Adrian Ricchiuti
- League: Campionato Sammarinese di Calcio
- 2025–26: Campionato Sammarinese di Calcio, 13th of 16
Home colours	Away colours

S.C. Faetano is a Sanmarinese football club, based in Faetano. The club was founded in 1962. Faetano currently plays in Campionato Sammarinese di Calcio, the only football league of San Marino. The team's colours are yellow and blue.

== Achievements ==
- Campionato Sammarinese di Calcio: 3
  - Winners: 1985–86, 1990–91, 1998–99
  - Runner-up: 1986–87,
- Coppa Titano: 3
  - Winners: 1993, 1994, 1998
- San Marino Federal Trophy: 1
  - Winners: 1994,

== European record ==
Season	Competition	Round	Club	Home	Away	Agg.
2010-11	2010-11 UEFA Europa League	1QR	(Georgia (country)) Zestaponi	0–0	0–5	0–5

== Current squad ==
As of 4 February 2026

Note: Flags indicate national team as defined under FIFA eligibility rules; some limited exceptions apply. Players may hold more than one non-FIFA nationality.

No.	Pos.	Nation	Player
2	DF	SMR	Manuel De Biagi
4	DF	ITA	Samuele Tugliani
5	DF	ITA	Filippo Ioli
6	MF	ITA	Andrea Devenuto
7	FW	ITA	Giuseppe Elia
8	MF	SMR	Enrico Golinucci
10	FW	ITA	Gabriele Pallante
11	MF	SMR	Kevin Zonzini
14	FW	TUR	Sebastian Alabay
15	DF	ITA	Claudio Damato
16	MF	SMR	Alessandro Renzi
17	FW	ITA	Alessandro Contino
18	FW	ALB	Malvin Zeka

No.	Pos.	Nation	Player
20	MF	ITA	Giacomo Peri
22	DF	ITA	Ciro Di Palma
23	MF	ITA	Santo Emanuel Agati
24	GK	ITA	Simone Venturini
25	DF	ITA	Stefano Kokeri
27	DF	ITA	Rocco Berlen
29	MF	ITA	Alessio Bertuccini
33	GK	ITA	Marco Casalboni
35	MF	ITA	Alexander Lanzu
55	GK	ITA	Vincenzo Galesi
80	MF	ITA	Gerardo Di Fronzo
84	DF	ITA	Cristian Abbadessa
