= SS Pennarossa =

Sanmarinese football club

Pennarossa
- Full name: Società Sportiva Pennarossa
- Founded: 1968; 58 years ago
- Ground: Campo Sportivo di Chiesanuova, Chiesanuova, San Marino
- Chairman: Sergio Conti
- Manager: Filippo Dolci
- League: Campionato Sammarinese di Calcio
- 2025–26: Campionato Sammarinese di Calcio, 11th of 16
Home colours	Away colours

Società Sportiva Pennarossa is a Sanmarinese football club, based in Chiesanuova. The club was founded in 1968. Pennarossa currently plays in Girone A of Campionato Sammarinese di Calcio. The team's colors are red and white.

== Honours ==
- Campionato Sammarinese di Calcio: 1

2003–04

- Coppa Titano: 2

2003, 2004

- San Marino Federal Trophy: 1

2003

== Current squad ==
Updated as of 4 February 2026

Note: Flags indicate national team as defined under FIFA eligibility rules; some limited exceptions apply. Players may hold more than one non-FIFA nationality.

No.	Pos.	Nation	Player
3	DF	ITA	Federico De Paoli
3	DF	SMR	Filippo Santi (on loan from La Fiorita)
4	MF	ITA	Francesco Angelini
5	DF	ITA	Gabriele Varrella
6	MF	ITA	Alessio Boschi
7	MF	ITA	Luka Cobo
8	DF	ITA	Alessio Pezzella
9	MF	ITA	Emanuele Gregori
11	FW	ITA	Riccardo Bezzini
16	MF	ITA	Maximilian Tolomeo
17	FW	ITA	Mattia Pintore
19	FW	SMR	Matteo Tumidei
20	MF	ALB	Sotiri Papa

No.	Pos.	Nation	Player
21	MF	ITA	Tommaso Domini
22	DF	ITA	Cristian Grieco
23	MF	ITA	Eleas Zahir
24	DF	SMR	Diego Arlotti
27	MF	SMR	Mattia Fabbri
29	MF	ITA	Manuel Socciarelli
32	GK	ITA	Manuel Pizzolante
33	DF	ITA	Ciro Parisi
44	DF	ITA	Cesare Martini
71	GK	ITA	Manuel Tordella
77	FW	ITA	Mario Dulcetti
99	MF	ITA	Antonio Azzurro

== European record ==
Season	Competition	Round	Club	Home	Away	Agg.
2004-05	2004-05 UEFA Cup	1QR	(Bosnia and Herzegovina) Željezničar	1–5	0–4	1–9
