= FC Fiorentino =

Sanmarinese football club

Fiorentino
- Full name: Football Club Fiorentino
- Founded: 1974 (as S.S. Montevito)
- Ground: Campo Sportivo di Fiorentino
- Capacity: 700
- Chairman: Primo Moretti
- Manager: Leonardo Acori
- League: Campionato Sammarinese di Calcio
- 2025–26: Campionato Sammarinese di Calcio, 7th of 16
Home colours	Away colours

F.C. Fiorentino is a Sanmarinese football club, based in Fiorentino. The club was founded in 1974. Fiorentino currently plays in Girone A of Campionato Sammarinese di Calcio. The team's colors are blue and red. Until the 2004–05 season the club was known as S.S. Montevito.

== Achievements ==
- Campionato Sammarinese di Calcio: 1

1991–92 (as S.S. Montevito)

== Current squad ==
As of 4 February 2026

Note: Flags indicate national team as defined under FIFA eligibility rules; some limited exceptions apply. Players may hold more than one non-FIFA nationality.

No.	Pos.	Nation	Player
2	GK	SMR	Michele Berardi
3	DF	ITA	Stefano Cucchi
4	MF	ITA	Marco Evaristi
6	DF	ITA	Luca Evaristi
7	FW	SMR	Sami Abouzziane
8	MF	SMR	Alessandro Molinari (captain)
9	MF	ITA	Manuel Pesciarelli
11	FW	MAR	Mohamed Ben Kacem
12	DF	SMR	Angelo Faetanini
13	GK	SMR	Simone Benedettini
14	DF	SMR	Alessandro Terenzi
16	MF	ITA	Filippo Zoffoli

No.	Pos.	Nation	Player
17	MF	SMR	Andrea Dolcini
20	MF	ALB	Alen Gjonaj
21	MF	SMR	Andrea Borgagni
22	DF	ITA	Gianluigi Galeone
23	DF	ITA	Mattia Costantini
27	DF	ITA	Riccardo Tosse
32	DF	ITA	Luca Bottoni
33	MF	ITA	Francesco Mariano
80	FW	ITA	Soufiane Belward
88	FW	ITA	Luca Pesenti
99	FW	ITA	Matteo Dari

== Former players ==
- (Belarus) Evgeny Lipen
