= 2013–14 Coppa Titano =

Tournament details
- Country: San Marino
- Teams: 15

Tournament statistics
- Matches played: 72
- Goals scored: 173 (2.4 per match)
- Top goal scorer: Daniele Pignieri (8 goals)

The 2013–14 Coppa Titano is the 56th season of San Marino's oldest football competition. It begins on 23 September 2013 with the first games of the Group Stage and will end in May 2014 with the final. La Fiorita are the defending champions, having won their third cup final last season.

The winner of the cup final will enter the first qualifying round of the 2014–15 UEFA Europa League.

== Competition format ==
The competition consists of two stages, the Group Stage and the Elimination Rounds. The Group Stage consists of three groups with five teams each. Every team plays two games (once "home" and once "away") against every other team in its group. The top two teams from each group, as well as the two best third-placed teams, qualify for the Elimination Rounds. The Elimination Rounds are a single-game elimination tournament. Games in the Elimination Rounds are decided by extra time and, if necessary, a penalty shootout.

== Group stage ==
Update on 19 March

=== Group A ===
| Team | Pld | W | D | L | GF | GA | GD | Pts | J/D | FOL | SGI | DOM | PEN |
|---|---|---|---|---|---|---|---|---|---|---|---|---|---|
| Juvenes/Dogana | 8 | 4 | 2 | 2 | 17 | 12 | +5 | 14 | | 0–1 | 3–5 | 1–0 | 2–1 |
| Folgore | 8 | 4 | 2 | 2 | 14 | 9 | +5 | 14 | 2–2 | | 3–0 | 1–2 | 1–1 |
| San Giovanni | 8 | 4 | 1 | 3 | 18 | 18 | 0 | 13 | 1–6 | 4–2 | | 3–4 | 0–0 |
| Domagnano | 8 | 2 | 2 | 4 | 11 | 16 | −5 | 8 | 2–2 | 0–3 | 0–2 | | 1–1 |
| Pennarossa | 8 | 1 | 3 | 4 | 6 | 11 | −5 | 6 | 0–1 | 0–1 | 0–3 | 3–2 | |

Legend: Blue = home team win; Yellow = draw; Red = away team win.

=== Group B ===
| Team | Pld | W | D | L | GF | GA | GD | Pts | LIB | TFI | VIR | MUR | CAI |
|---|---|---|---|---|---|---|---|---|---|---|---|---|---|
| Libertas | 8 | 3 | 5 | 0 | 13 | 7 | +6 | 14 | | 1–1 | 0–0 | 2–0 | 3–0 |
| Tre Fiori | 8 | 3 | 3 | 2 | 13 | 9 | +4 | 12 | 2–3 | | 1–2 | 2–0 | 2–2 |
| Virtus | 8 | 3 | 3 | 2 | 8 | 9 | −1 | 12 | 1–1 | 0–3 | | 1–0 | 1–1 |
| Murata | 8 | 3 | 1 | 4 | 9 | 11 | −2 | 10 | 1–1 | 1–2 | 2–1 | | 3–1 |
| Cailungo | 8 | 0 | 4 | 4 | 8 | 15 | −7 | 4 | 2–2 | 0–0 | 1–2 | 1–2 | |

Legend: Blue = home team win; Yellow = draw; Red = away team win.

=== Group C ===
| Team | Pld | W | D | L | GF | GA | GD | Pts | FAE | COS | TPE | LFI | FIO |
|---|---|---|---|---|---|---|---|---|---|---|---|---|---|
| Faetano | 8 | 4 | 3 | 1 | 10 | 7 | +3 | 15 | | 2–2 | 0–4 | 1–1 | 1–0 |
| Cosmos | 8 | 4 | 2 | 2 | 13 | 12 | +1 | 14 | 0–4 | | 0–0 | 3–1 | 3–1 |
| Tre Penne | 8 | 3 | 4 | 1 | 16 | 6 | +10 | 13 | 0–0 | 1–2 | | 2–2 | 5–0 |
| La Fiorita | 8 | 2 | 3 | 3 | 11 | 14 | −3 | 9 | 0–1 | 2–1 | 2–2 | | 3–2 |
| Fiorentino | 8 | 1 | 0 | 7 | 6 | 17 | −11 | 3 | 0–1 | 1–2 | 0–2 | 2–0 | |

Legend: Blue = home team win; Yellow = draw; Red = away team win.

== Elimination rounds ==
=== Quarterfinals ===
These matches took place on 17 April 2014.

| Team 1 | Score | Team 2 |
|---|---|---|
| Faetano | 2−0 | San Giovanni |
| Folgore | 1−3 | Cosmos |
| Libertas | 0−0 (4−2 p) | Tre Penne |
| Tre Fiori | 3−2 | Juvenes/Dogana |

=== Semifinals ===
These matches took place on 23 April 2014.

| 23 April 2014 | Faetano | 2–1 | Cosmos | Faetano |
| 21:00 | Fucili 42'; A. Moroni 78' | | Maccagno 76' |

| 23 April 2014 | Libertas | 1–0 | Tre Fiori | Borgo Maggiore |
| 21:00 | Antonelli 10' |

=== Final ===
28 April 2014
21:15

| Faetano | 0–2 | Libertas |
|---|---|---|
| | Report | Facondini 72'; Golinucci 83' |

Stadio Olimpico, Serravalle
Referee: Luca Barbeno

=== Champions ===

Libertas
(11th title)
