= 2020–21 Coppa Titano =

Tournament details
- Country: San Marino
- Teams: 15

Final positions
- Champions: La Fiorita
- Runners-up: Tre Fiori

Tournament statistics
- Matches played: 21
- Goals scored: 56 (2.67 per match)

The 2020–21 Coppa Titano was the sixty-third edition of the football competition in San Marino. The cup started on 29 September 2020 and ended on 15 May 2021. The cup champions earned a place in the first season of the new 2021–22 UEFA Europa Conference League.

The previous edition of the cup was abandoned with no champion due to the COVID-19 pandemic in San Marino.

After a delay due to the COVID-19 pandemic, the cup resumed play on 10 March 2021 with a change in format from two-leg to one-leg rounds.

== First round ==
The first legs of the first round were played from 29 September to 1 October 2020 and the second legs were played on 20–21 October 2020. The draw for the first round was held on 1 September 2020. Tre Penne received a bye in the first round.

Team 1	Agg.	Team 2	1st leg	2nd leg
Juvenes/Dogana	3–3 (4–5 p)	Domagnano	1–3	2–0
Cosmos	4–2	Cailungo	3–0	1–2
Pennarossa	2–3	Tre Fiori	2–1	0–2
Folgore	4–0	Virtus	2–0	2–0
Faetano	2–4	Fiorentino	1–1	1–3
Murata	2–1	San Giovanni	1–1	1–0
Libertas	1–5	La Fiorita	0–4	1–1

== Quarter–finals ==
The quarter–finals were played on 10 March 2021.

Team 1	Score	Team 2
Cosmos	0–1	Tre Fiori
Murata	3–4	La Fiorita
Tre Penne	2–0	Domagnano
Folgore	4–1	Fiorentino

== Semi–finals ==
The semi–finals were played on 28–29 April 2021.

Team 1	Score	Team 2
Tre Penne	0–2	Tre Fiori
Folgore	1–2	La Fiorita

== Final ==
The final was played on 15 May 2021.

15 May 2021
20:45

Tre Fiori	0–0 (a.e.t.)	La Fiorita
Penalties
	9–10

San Marino Stadium, Serravalle

== See also ==
- 2020–21 Campionato Sammarinese di Calcio
