= 2019–20 Coppa Titano =

Tournament details
- Country: San Marino
- Teams: 15

Tournament statistics
- Matches played: 22
- Goals scored: 76 (3.45 per match)

The 2019–20 Coppa Titano was the sixty-second edition of the football competition in San Marino. The new cup format which began the previous season was used again.

Tre Fiori were the defending champions after winning the previous season's cup by defeating Folgore in the final by the score of 1–0.

The cup was abandoned due to the COVID-19 pandemic in San Marino.

== Format ==
The draw for the competition was held on 27 August 2019. The final would have been contested over one leg, with all earlier rounds being contested over two legs. When a winner could not be determined after 180 minutes, extra time and eventually penalties would be used to determine a winner. A fourth substitution was allowed when extra time was needed to determine a winner.

== First round ==
The first legs of the first round were played on 26–27 October 2019, and the second legs were played on 9–10 November 2019. The draw for the first round was held on 27 August 2019. As defending champions, Tre Fiori were given a bye in the first round.

Team 1	Agg.	Team 2	1st leg	2nd leg
Domagnano	2–1	Fiorentino	2–1	0–0
Virtus	1–5	Cailungo	1–2	0–3
Murata	2–4	Tre Penne	0–2	2–2
Folgore	4–1	Faetano	2–1	2–0
Juvenes/Dogana	2–3	Libertas	2–1	0–2
San Giovanni	1–5	Cosmos	1–4	0–1
Pennarossa	4–5	La Fiorita	2–3	2–2

== Quarter–finals ==
The first legs of the quarter–finals were played on 26–27 November 2019, and the second legs were played on 10–11 December 2019.

Team 1	Agg.	Team 2	1st leg	2nd leg
Tre Fiori	8–2	Domagnano	4–1	4–1
Cosmos	1–8	La Fiorita	1–3	0–5
Folgore	4–2	Libertas	2–1	2–1
Cailungo	0–11	Tre Penne	0–5	0–6

== See also ==
- 2019–20 Campionato Sammarinese di Calcio
