= 2002–03 Campionato Sammarinese di Calcio =

Campionato Sammarinese di Calcio
- Season: 2002–03
- Champions: F.C. Domagnano

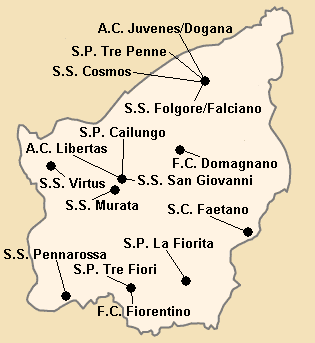
2002–03 Campionato Sammarinese di Calcio team distribution

The 2002–03 Campionato Sammarinese di Calcio season was the 18th season since its establishment. It was contested by 15 teams, and F.C. Domagnano won the championship.

== Regular season ==
=== Group A ===
Pos	Team	Pld	W	D	L	GF	GA	GD	Pts	Qualification
1	Pennarossa	20	12	4	4	48	22	+26	40	Qualification for the championship play–offs
2	Murata	20	11	6	3	41	25	+16	39	Qualification for the championship play–offs
3	Cailungo	20	10	8	2	40	19	+21	38	Qualification for the championship play–offs
4	Faetano	20	10	6	4	31	19	+12	36	
5	Folgore/Falciano	20	6	7	7	24	27	−3	25	
6	Montevito	20	1	6	13	21	48	−27	9	
7	La Fiorita	20	2	1	17	11	54	−43	7	

Source: rsssf.com

=== Group B ===
Pos	Team	Pld	W	D	L	GF	GA	GD	Pts	Qualification
1	Domagnano	21	11	6	4	32	18	+14	39	Qualification for the championship play–offs
2	Libertas	21	10	4	7	32	22	+10	34	Qualification for the championship play–offs
3	Virtus	21	8	8	5	32	27	+5	32	Qualification for the championship play–offs
4	Tre Penne	21	7	9	5	30	27	+3	30	
5	Cosmos	21	5	10	6	29	38	−9	25	
6	Juvenes/Dogana	21	4	11	6	23	28	−5	23	
7	Tre Fiori	21	4	8	9	25	32	−7	20	
8	San Giovanni	21	4	4	13	24	37	−13	16	

Source: rsssf.com

=== Results ===
All teams play twice against the teams within their own group and once against the teams from the other group.

Home \ Away	CAI	COS	DOM	FAE	FOL	J/D	LFI	LIB	MON	MUR	PEN	SGI	TFI	TPE	VIR
Cailungo			0–0	1–2	1–1	2–0	5–0		2–0	0–0	2–3	2–0			1–1
Cosmos	1–4		1–0			1–1	0–1	0–6	3–0		1–4	1–3	2–2	1–1	5–2
Domagnano		4–1			1–1	1–1		1–0		2–1	1–2	3–1	1–0	4–3	1–1
Faetano	0–2	1–1	0–0		2–2		4–1	2–1	3–0	1–2	2–1		1–2		
Folgore	0–1	2–2		0–2			2–0		4–1	1–0	1–1			1–4	1–2
Juvenes/Dogana		2–3	2–2	1–1	2–2			1–0			0–2	1–1	1–1	2–2	2–0
La Fiorita	0–4		0–1	0–3	0–2	0–1		0–2	3–0	1–2	0–2	1–4			
Libertas	2–3	1–1	1–0		3–0	1–1			1–1			1–0	3–1	1–0	0–0
Montevito	3–3		1–3	1–2	0–1	2–3	1–1			1–4	1–5		2–2		2–2
Murata	3–3	1–1		1–1	1–0	2–0	4–0	6–3	2–1		1–4			4–1	
Pennarossa	2–3			1–0	2–0		9–1	0–1	1–1	1–1		3–0	2–1	2–4	
San Giovanni		1–1	0–4	0–1	1–2	1–1		0–1	1–2	1–2			2–0	1–2	1–2
Tre Fiori	1–1	0–1	2–1		1–1	2–0	3–1	1–3		2–2		1–2		1–1	1–1
Tre Penne	0–0	1–1	0–1	0–0		0–0	1–0	2–1	2–1			3–3	2–0		0–0
Virtus		1–1	0–1	2–3		2–1	4–1	2–0		1–2	1–1	3–1	2–1	3–1	

Legend: Blue = home team win; Yellow = draw; Red = away team win.

== Championship playoffs ==
=== First round ===
Team 1	Score	Team 2
Murata	3–2	Virtus
Libertas	2–1	Cailungo

=== Second round ===
Team 1	Score	Team 2
Domagnano	4–1	Murata
Pennarossa	3–2	Libertas

=== Third round ===
Team 1	Score	Team 2
Cailungo	2–4	Murata
Virtus	0–1	Libertas

=== Fourth round ===
Team 1	Score	Team 2
Domagnano	0–0 (4–5 p)	Pennarossa
Murata	3–3 (3–4 p)	Libertas

=== Semifinal ===
Team 1	Score	Team 2
Domagnano	5–1	Libertas

=== Final ===
Team 1	Score	Team 2
Pennarossa	1–2	Domagnano
