= 1998–99 Campionato Sammarinese di Calcio =

Campionato Sammarinese di Calcio
- Season: 1998–99
- Champions: S.C. Faetano

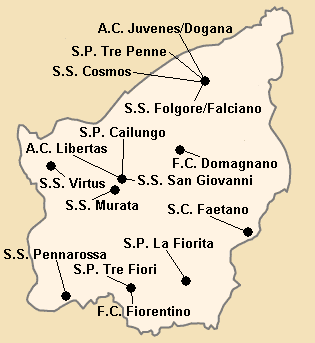
1998–99 Campionato Sammarinese di Calcio team distribution

The 1998–99 Campionato Sammarinese di Calcio season was the 14th season since its establishment. It was contested by 16 teams, and S.C. Faetano won the championship.

== Regular season ==
=== Group A ===
Pos	Team	Pld	W	D	L	GF	GA	GD	Pts	Qualification
1	S.S. Folgore/Falciano	22	12	7	3	52	30	+22	43	Qualification for the championship play–offs
2	F.C. Domagnano	22	12	6	4	44	28	+16	42	Qualification for the championship play–offs
3	S.S. Cosmos	22	12	5	5	38	22	+16	41	Qualification for the championship play–offs
4	S.P. Tre Fiori	22	10	6	6	45	34	+11	36	
5	S.P. La Fiorita	22	10	4	8	29	32	−3	34	
6	S.S. Pennarossa	22	8	5	9	42	50	−8	29	
7	S.S. Montevito	22	7	6	9	32	37	−5	27	
8	S.S. San Giovanni	22	3	6	13	21	47	−26	15	

Source: rsssf.com

=== Group B ===
Pos	Team	Pld	W	D	L	GF	GA	GD	Pts	Qualification
1	S.S. Murata	22	17	2	3	61	34	+27	53	Qualification for the championship play–offs
2	S.P. Tre Penne	22	11	6	5	51	41	+10	39	Qualification for the championship play–offs
3	S.C. Faetano	22	11	5	6	32	16	+16	38	Qualification for the championship play–offs
4	S.S. Virtus	22	8	4	10	46	37	+9	28	
5	G.S. Dogana	22	5	6	11	21	33	−12	21	
6	S.S. Juvenes	22	4	5	13	20	40	−20	17	
7	A.C. Libertas	22	2	6	14	25	57	−32	12	
8	S.P. Cailungo	22	2	5	15	22	43	−21	11	

Source: rsssf.com

=== Results ===
All teams play twice against the teams within their own group and once against the teams from the other group.

Home \ Away	CAI	COS	DOG	DOM	FAE	FOL	JUV	LFI	LIB	MON	MUR	PEN	SGI	TFI	TPE	VIR
Cailungo		0–3	0–0		1–0	2–4	2–4		4–0		1–3		1–1	2–3	2–3	0–4
Cosmos			2–1	1–1		0–1	1–0	0–0	5–1	1–1	0–1	3–2	2–1	1–0		
Dogana	1–0				0–3		0–0		0–0	1–2	1–4	1–2	3–0	1–3	1–3	3–1
Domagnano	3–0	2–1	3–0			0–0		2–1		2–1		2–0	4–0	2–2	0–0	2–1
Faetano	2–0	1–1	1–1	1–2			0–0	2–0	3–1		4–0			1–0	0–1	3–1
Folgore		3–0	1–1	1–0	0–0			1–2		3–4	3–0	2–1	3–1	3–3	3–3	
Juvenes	2–1		0–3	1–1	1–2	3–1		1–2	0–0		0–1	2–4			0–1	2–1
La Fiorita	1–0	3–5	1–0	0–2		2–3			3–1	0–0		2–3	1–0	2–1		1–0
Libertas	1–1		0–1	2–3	2–1	1–4	2–2				1–3	2–3	2–2		3–6	1–3
Montevito	1–1	0–3		4–0	0–1	1–4	2–0	2–2	1–1			1–1	2–1	1–2		
Murata	3–2		4–2	5–3	2–2		4–0	3–0	6–1	1–0		7–3			3–2	2–6
Pennarossa	1–0	0–1		2–6	2–1	1–4		1–1		2–1			0–3	1–2	7–3	2–2
San Giovanni		0–4		2–2	0–3	1–4	2–1	1–0		0–1	1–4	2–2		0–0		0–2
Tre Fiori		2–3		3–1		1–1	3–0	2–3	2–0	3–2	0–1	2–2	3–0		3–3	
Tre Penne	2–1	1–1	3–0		1–0		4–0	1–2	3–1	2–3	2–2		3–3			3–2
Virtus	1–1	1–0	0–0		0–1	3–3	3–1		1–2	6–2	0–2			4–5	4–1	

Legend: Blue = home team win; Yellow = draw; Red = away team win.

== Championship playoffs ==
=== First round ===
- F.C. Domagnano 1–0 S.C. Faetano
- S.P. Tre Penne 1–3 S.S. Cosmos

=== Second round ===
- S.S. Folgore/Falciano 2–1 S.S. Cosmos
- S.S. Murata 2–3 F.C. Domagnano

=== Third round ===
- S.S. Murata 2–3 S.P. Tre Penne
- S.S. Cosmos 1–2 S.C. Faetano

=== Fourth round ===
- F.C. Domagnano 3–3 (pen 6–7) S.S. Folgore/Falciano
- S.P. Tre Penne 1–2 S.C. Faetano

=== Semifinals ===
- F.C. Domagnano 1–1 (pen 1–4) S.C. Faetano

=== Final ===
- S.C. Faetano 1–0 S.S. Folgore/Falciano
