= 2017–18 Coppa Titano =

Tournament details
- Country: San Marino
- Teams: 15

Final positions
- Champions: La Fiorita
- Runners-up: Tre Penne

The 2017–18 Coppa Titano was the 60th version of the football competition. This competition began on 26 September 2017. The winners of the Coppa Titano, La Fiorita, earned a place in the 2018–19 Europa League and would begin play in the preliminary round.

S. P. Tre Penne were the defending champions after winning the previous season by defeating S.P. La Fiorita in the final by the score of 2–0.

== Format ==
The fifteen clubs from San Marino were drawn into four groups on 19 August 2017. The winners and runners-up from each group advanced to the knockout stage.

== Group stage ==
The clubs played six matches against the other clubs in their group. In groups A, B, and C the clubs played each other twice. In group D the clubs played each other three times.

=== Group A ===
Pos	Team	Pld	W	D	L	GF	GA	GD	Pts	Qualification
1	Folgore	6	4	2	0	14	3	+11	14	Knockout stage
2	Juvenes/Dogana	6	3	3	0	11	5	+6	12	Knockout stage
3	Murata	6	1	1	4	6	15	−9	4	
4	San Giovanni	6	0	2	4	4	12	−8	2	

Source: soccerway.com
Rules for classification: 1) Points; 2) Goal difference; 3) Goals scored; 4) Head-to-head points; 5) Head-to-head goal difference; 6) Head-to-head goals scored; 7) Draw

Home \ Away	FOL	JUV	MUR	SAN
Folgore	—	1–1	3–0	2–0
Juvenes/Dogana	0–0	—	4–1	1–1
Murata	1–4	1–3	—	1–1
San Giovanni	1–4	1–2	0–2	—

Legend: Blue = home team win; Yellow = draw; Red = away team win.

=== Group B ===
Pos	Team	Pld	W	D	L	GF	GA	GD	Pts	Qualification
1	La Fiorita	6	5	0	1	14	4	+10	15	Knockout stage
2	Domagnano	6	4	1	1	13	5	+8	13	Knockout stage
3	Tre Fiori	6	2	1	3	6	5	+1	7	
4	Cailungo	6	0	0	6	1	20	−19	0	

Source: soccerway.com
Rules for classification: 1) Points; 2) Goal difference; 3) Goals scored; 4) Head-to-head points; 5) Head-to-head goal difference; 6) Head-to-head goals scored; 7) Draw

Home \ Away	CAI	DOM	LAF	TRE
Cailungo	—	0–4	0–6	0–2
Domagnano	3–0	—	1–2	1–1
La Fiorita	2–0	2–3	—	1–0
Tre Fiori	3–1	0–1	0–1	—

Legend: Blue = home team win; Yellow = draw; Red = away team win.

=== Group C ===
Pos	Team	Pld	W	D	L	GF	GA	GD	Pts	Qualification
1	Virtus	6	5	0	1	12	6	+6	15	Knockout stage
2	Faetano	6	3	1	2	9	7	+2	10	Knockout stage
3	Libertas	6	3	0	3	6	7	−1	9	
4	Fiorentino	6	0	1	5	4	11	−7	1	

Source: soccerway.com
Rules for classification: 1) Points; 2) Goal difference; 3) Goals scored; 4) Head-to-head points; 5) Head-to-head goal difference; 6) Head-to-head goals scored; 7) Draw

Home \ Away	FAE	FIO	LIB	VIR
Faetano	—	2–0	2–0	0–1
Fiorentino	2–2	—	1–2	0–2
Libertas	0–1	1–0	—	1–2
Virtus	4–2	2–1	1–2	—

Legend: Blue = home team win; Yellow = draw; Red = away team win.

=== Group D ===
Pos	Team	Pld	W	D	L	GF	GA	GD	Pts	Qualification
1	Tre Penne	6	5	0	1	20	8	+12	15	Knockout stage
2	Cosmos	6	2	1	3	11	13	−2	7	Knockout stage
3	Pennarossa	6	1	1	4	6	16	−10	4	

Source: soccerway.com
Rules for classification: 1) Points; 2) Goal difference; 3) Goals scored; 4) Head-to-head points; 5) Head-to-head goal difference; 6) Head-to-head goals scored; 7) Draw

==== Matches 1–4 ====
Home \ Away	COS	PEN	TRE
Cosmos	—	4–1	2–4
Pennarossa	2–0	—	1–3
Tre Penne	4–2	5–0	—

Legend: Blue = home team win; Yellow = draw; Red = away team win.

==== Matches 5–6 ====
Home \ Away	COS	PEN	TRE
Cosmos	—	—	2–1
Pennarossa	1–1	—	—
Tre Penne	—	3–1	—

Legend: Blue = home team win; Yellow = draw; Red = away team win.

== Knockout stage ==
=== Quarter-final ===
17 April 2018
20:45

La Fiorita	5–1 (a.e.t.)	Faetano

17 April 2018
20:45

Juvenes/Dogana	4–2 (a.e.t.)	Virtus

18 April 2018
20:45

Folgore	1–0	Cosmos

18 April 2018
20:45

Domagnano	1–4	Tre Penne

=== Semi-final ===
21 April 2018
9:00

La Fiorita	2–0	Juvenes/Dogana

21 April 2018
12:30

Folgore	0–1	Tre Penne

=== Final ===
25 April 2018
14:45

La Fiorita	3–2 (a.e.t.)	Tre Penne

San Marino Stadium, Serravalle
Referee: Gianluca Ceccarelli

== See also ==
- 2017–18 Campionato Sammarinese di Calcio
