= 2008–09 Campionato Sammarinese di Calcio =

Campionato Sammarinese di Calcio
- Season: 2008–09
- Champions: S.P. Tre Fiori; 5th Sammarinese title
- UEFA Champions League: S.P. Tre Fiori
- UEFA Europa League: A.C. Juvenes/Dogana (via domestic cup)
- Goals: 512
- Average goals/game: 3.12
- Biggest home win: Tre Fiori 7–0 San Giovanni
- Biggest away win: Fiorentino 2–8 Virtus
- Highest scoring: San Giovanni 4–8 Cosmos

The 2008–09 Campionato Sammarinese di Calcio season was the twenty-fourth since its establishment. The season began with the first regular season games on 12 September 2008 and ended with the play-off final on 29 May 2009.

== Participating teams ==
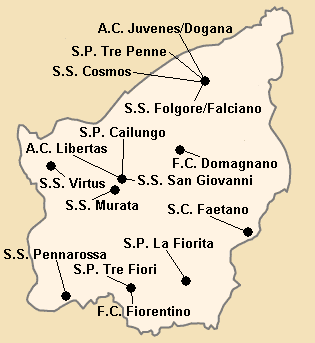
Campionato Sammarinese di Calcio 2008–09 team distribution

- S.P. Cailungo (Borgo Maggiore)
- S.S. Cosmos (Serravalle)
- F.C. Domagnano (Domagnano)
- S.C. Faetano (Faetano)
- S.S. Folgore/Falciano (Serravalle)
- F.C. Fiorentino (Fiorentino)
- A.C. Juvenes/Dogana (Serravalle)
- S.S. Pennarossa (Chiesanuova)
- S.P. La Fiorita (Montegiardino)
- A.C. Libertas (Borgo Maggiore)
- S.S. Murata (San Marino)
- S.S. San Giovanni (Borgo Maggiore)
- S.P. Tre Fiori (Fiorentino)
- S.P. Tre Penne (Serravalle)
- S.S. Virtus (Acquaviva)

== Venues ==
The teams do not have grounds of their own due to restricted space in San Marino. Each match was randomly assigned to one of the following grounds:

- Stadio Olimpico (Serravalle)
- Campo di Fiorentino (Fiorentino)
- Campo di Acquaviva (Chiesanuova)
- Campo di Dogana (Serravalle)
- Campo Fonte dell'Ovo (Domagnano)
- Campo di Serravalle "B" (Serravalle)

== Regular season ==
=== Group A ===
Pos	Team	Pld	W	D	L	GF	GA	GD	Pts	Qualification
1	Virtus	20	10	5	5	34	22	+12	35 (Note: VIR 1–2 TPE; TPE 0–2 VIR)	Qualification for the championship play–offs
2	Tre Penne	20	9	8	3	35	24	+11	35	Qualification for the championship play–offs
3	Juvenes/Dogana	20	9	7	4	25	13	+12	34 (Note: J/D 3–0 PEN; PEN 2–0 J/D)	Qualification for the championship play–offs (Note: Juvenes/Dogana qualified for the second qualifying round of UEFA Europa League as a result of their winning 2008–09 Coppa Titano)
4	Pennarossa	20	10	4	6	35	24	+11	34	
5	La Fiorita	20	9	4	7	35	28	+7	31	
6	Libertas	20	8	4	8	30	31	−1	28	
7	Domagnano	20	5	2	13	23	38	−15	17	

Source: fsgc.sm (in Italian)
Rules for classification: 1) points; 2) head-to-head points; 3) head-to-head goal difference; 4) head-to-head goals scored; 5) goal difference; 6) number of goals scored.

=== Group B ===
Pos	Team	Pld	W	D	L	GF	GA	GD	Pts	Qualification
1	Tre Fiori (C)	21	14	5	2	53	20	+33	47	Qualification for the championship play–offs
2	Murata	21	11	5	5	38	20	+18	38	Qualification for the championship play–offs
3	Faetano	21	9	7	5	39	34	+5	34 (Note: FAE 1–2 COS; COS 0–2 FAE)	Qualification for the championship play–offs
4	Cosmos	21	11	1	9	44	37	+7	34	
5	Folgore	21	6	6	9	28	30	−2	24	
6	Cailungo	21	6	5	10	23	30	−7	23	
7	Fiorentino	21	3	2	16	21	61	−40	11	
8	San Giovanni	21	0	3	18	19	70	−51	3	

Source: fsgc.sm (in Italian)
Rules for classification: 1) points; 2) head-to-head points; 3) head-to-head goal difference; 4) head-to-head goals scored; 5) goal difference; 6) number of goals scored.
(C) Champions

=== Results ===
All teams play twice against the teams within their own group and once against the teams from the other group.

Home \ Away	CAI	COS	DOM	FAE	FIO	FOL	J/D	LFI	LIB	MUR	PEN	SGI	TFI	TPE	VIR
Cailungo		0–3		2–2	0–2	1–0	0–0		1–1	0–1		3–0	1–3		0–0
Cosmos	2–1			0–2	3–2	3–2		1–2	1–4	0–3		4–0	5–0	0–2	
Domagnano	3–1	1–4		0–4			2–2	1–2	0–1		1–2	4–1		1–2	0–1
Faetano	1–1	1–2			5–0	0–1		2–2		2–1	1–5	2–1	0–4	1–1	3–1
Fiorentino	0–3	1–2	0–1	3–4		0–2	1–6			0–0		3–0	0–2	1–3	2–8
Folgore	2–3	0–1	1–1	4–1	2–0			0–4		1–2	1–1	5–1	1–4		
Juvenes/Dogana		1–0	3–0	1–2		2–0		1–0	1–0	0–2	3–0			1–1	0–0
La Fiorita	0–1		1–2		6–0		1–1		1–0	0–0	1–0	4–2		0–3	3–4
Libertas			4–2	2–3	3–1	1–0	2–1	1–2			2–3	2–2	0–2	1–1	1–4
Murata	4–1	2–1	4–1	1–1	3–3	1–2			0–1		2–1	3–0	1–3		0–1
Pennarossa	2–0	3–3	2–1		4–0		2–0	2–1	2–3				1–1	1–2	2–0
San Giovanni	0–2	4–8		2–2	1–2	2–2	0–1			0–5	0–1		0–3	3–6	
Tre Fiori	1–0	4–0	1–0	0–0	3–0	1–1	0–1	4–1		2–2		7–0			
Tre Penne	3–2		2–1			1–1	0–0	2–3	0–0	0–1	1–1		3–3		0–2
Virtus		2–1	0–1			0–0	0–0	1–1	4–1		1–0	1–0	3–5	1–2	

Source: fsgc.sm (in Italian)
Legend: Blue = home team win; Yellow = draw; Red = away team win.

== Play-off ==
The playoff was held in a double-eliminination format. Both group winners earned a bye in the first and second round.

=== First round ===
The matches were played on 7 May 2009.

Team 1	Score	Team 2
Murata	0–1	Juvenes/Dogana
Tre Penne	1–0	Faetano

=== Second round ===
The matches were played on 12 May 2009.

Team 1	Score	Team 2
Juvenes/Dogana	2–0	Tre Penne
Murata	5–4	Faetano

=== Third round ===
The matches were played on 15 and 16 May 2009.

Team 1	Score	Team 2
Murata	4–0	Tre Penne
Virtus	0–2	Tre Fiori

=== Fourth round ===
The matches were played on 19 and 20 May 2009.

Team 1	Score	Team 2
Murata	3–2 (a.e.t.)	Virtus
Tre Fiori	1–1 (a.e.t.) (6–5 p)	Juvenes/Dogana

=== Semifinal ===
The match was played on 25 May 2009 at Stadio Olimpico, Serravalle.

Team 1	Score	Team 2
Murata	1–3 (a.e.t.)	Juvenes/Dogana

=== Final ===
The final was played on 29 May 2009 at Stadio Olimpico, Serravalle. The winners qualified for the first qualifying round of the UEFA Champions League 2009–10.

29 May 2009
21:00 CEST

Tre Fiori	0–0 (a.e.t.)	Juvenes/Dogana
	Report
Penalties
	3–1

Stadio Olimpico, Serravalle
