= 2012–13 Coppa Titano =

Tournament details
- Country: San Marino
- Teams: 15

Final positions
- Champions: La Fiorita
- Runners-up: San Giovanni

Tournament statistics
- Matches played: 67
- Goals scored: 188 (2.81 per match)
- Top goal scorer: M. Ugolini (7 goals)

The 2012-13 Coppa Titano is the 55th season of San Marino's oldest football competition. It began on 1 September 2012 with the first games of the Group Stage and will end in May 2013 with the final. La Fiorita are the defending champions, having won their second cup final last season.

The winner of the cup final will enter the first qualifying round of the 2013–14 UEFA Europa League.

== Competition format ==
The competition consists of two stages, the Group Stage and the Elimination Rounds. The Group Stage consists of three groups with five teams each. Every team plays two games (once "home" and once "away") against every other team in its group. The top two teams from each group, as well as the two best third-placed teams, qualify for the Elimination Rounds. The Elimination Rounds are a single-game elimination tournament. Games in the Elimination Rounds are decided by extra time and, if necessary, a penalty shootout.

== Group stage ==
Update on 10 April

=== Group A ===
Team	Pld	W	D	L	GF	GA	GD	Pts	SGI	TFI	COS	FOL	CAI
San Giovanni	8	5	2	1	12	7	+5	17		1–0	3–1	1–1	1–0
Tre Fiori	8	4	2	2	11	8	+3	14	3–2		3–2	1–0	1–1
Cosmos	8	4	1	3	15	10	+5	13	1–2	1–1		4–1	5–0
Folgore	8	2	3	3	7	9	−2	9	0–0	1–0	0–1		1–1
Cailungo	8	0	2	6	4	15	−11	2	1–2	0–2	1–2	0–1	

Legend: Blue = home team win; Yellow = draw; Red = away team win.

=== Group B ===
Team	Pld	W	D	L	GF	GA	GD	Pts	MUR	PEN	LIB	DOM	FAE
Murata	8	6	1	1	17	8	+9	19		4–1	2–1	3–1	2–1
Pennarossa	8	4	1	3	12	14	−2	13	2–1		3–1	2–2	2–1
Libertas	8	3	2	3	8	7	+1	11	0–1	2–0		0–0	2–1
Domagnano	8	1	4	3	7	8	−1	7	0–0	3–0	0–0		1–2
Faetano	8	2	0	6	8	15	−7	6	2–4	0–2	0–2	1–0	

Legend: Blue = home team win; Yellow = draw; Red = away team win.

=== Group C ===
Team	Pld	W	D	L	GF	GA	GD	Pts	TPE	LFI	J/D	FIO	VIR
Tre Penne	8	6	0	2	19	7	+12	18		4–1	0–1	1–2	5–1
La Fiorita	8	6	0	2	20	9	+11	18	0–2		3–1	1–0	3–0
Juvenes/Dogana	8	3	2	3	13	15	−2	11	0–1	1–5		2–2	2–2
Fiorentino	8	3	1	4	11	14	−3	10	2–3	0–3	1–2		2–1
Virtus	8	0	1	7	7	25	−18	1	0–3	1–4	1–4	1–2	

Legend: Blue = home team win; Yellow = draw; Red = away team win.

== Elimination rounds ==
=== Quarterfinals ===
These matches took place on 20 April 2013.

Team 1	Score	Team 2
Murata	2−3	Cosmos
San Giovanni	1−0	Pennarossa
Tre Penne	0−1	Libertas
La Fiorita	2−1	Tre Fiori

=== Semifinals ===
These matches took place on 25 April 2013.

Team 1	Score	Team 2
Cosmos	0−4	San Giovanni
Libertas	1–1 (a.e.t.); 3–5 (pen)	La Fiorita

=== Final ===
29 April 2013
21:15

San Giovanni	0 – 1	La Fiorita
	Report	S. Aruta 47'

Stadio Olimpico, Serravalle
Referee: Johnny Casanova
