= 2002-03 campioantk sammriese fmeminile =

Campionato Sammarinese Femminile
- Season: 2002–03
- Champions: Virtus (1st title)
- Relegated: None

The 2002–03 Campionato Sammarinese Femminile was the 8th season of the women's football league in San Marino. Virtus won their first championship title, defeating Pennarossa in the final.

== First stage ==
In the first stage, the 15 participating clubs were divided into two regional groups: Gruppo Emilia-Romagna (8 teams) and Gruppo Marche (7 teams). Teams played each other twice (home and away) within their respective groups.

The top three teams from each group advanced directly to Q1 (Championship Group), while the fourth-placed teams contested a single-match playoff for the final Q1 berth (with the loser entering Q2). The remaining teams entered Q2.

=== Gruppo Emilia-Romagna ===
==== Table ====
Pos	Team	Pld	W	D	L	GF	GA	GD	Pts	
1	Virtus	14	11	2	1	39	10	+29	35	Qualification to Q1
2	Juvenes/Dogana	14	9	3	2	32	13	+19	30	Qualification to Q1
3	Domagnano	14	8	2	4	26	16	+10	26	Qualification to Q1
4	Cosmos	14	6	3	5	21	18	+3	21	Qualification to Q1/Q2 Play-off
5	Murata	14	5	2	7	17	22	−5	17	Qualification to Q2
6	Faetano	14	4	2	8	14	25	−11	14	Qualification to Q2
7	Tre Penne	14	2	2	10	10	30	−20	8	Qualification to Q2
8	Folgore	14	1	2	11	8	33	−25	5	Qualification to Q2

Updated to match(es) played on unknown. Source: FSGC

==== Results ====
Home \ Away	COS	DOM	FAE	FOL	JUV	MUR	TRE	VIR
Cosmos								
Domagnano								
Faetano								
Folgore								
Juvenes/Dogana								
Murata								
Tre Penne								
Virtus								

Updated to match(es) played on unknown. Source:
Legend: Blue = home team win; Yellow = draw; Red = away team win.

=== Gruppo Marche ===
==== Table ====
Pos	Team	Pld	W	D	L	GF	GA	GD	Pts	
1	Pennarossa	12	9	2	1	29	8	+21	29	Qualification to Q1
2	Cailungo	12	8	2	2	24	10	+14	26	Qualification to Q1
3	La Fiorita	12	6	3	3	20	12	+8	21	Qualification to Q1
4	Libertas	12	5	2	5	17	16	+1	17	Qualification to Q1/Q2 Play-off
5	Tre Fiori	12	3	2	7	11	21	−10	11	Qualification to Q2
6	San Giovanni	12	2	2	8	8	23	−15	8	Qualification to Q2
7	Fiorentino	12	1	1	10	6	25	−19	4	Qualification to Q2

Updated to match(es) played on unknown. Source: FSGC

==== Results ====
Home \ Away	CAI	FIR	FIO	LIB	PEN	SGI	TFI
Cailungo							
Fiorentino							
La Fiorita							
Libertas							
Pennarossa							
San Giovanni							
Tre Fiori							

Updated to match(es) played on unknown. Source:
Legend: Blue = home team win; Yellow = draw; Red = away team win.

=== Q1/Q2 Play-off ===
The fourth-placed teams from each group met in a single match to determine the seventh and final team in Q1.

Cosmos	2–0	Libertas

Stadio Fonte dell'Ovo, San Marino

Cosmos qualified for Q1; Libertas entered Q2.

== Second stage ==
In the second stage, teams in Q1 (7 teams) and Q2 (8 teams) played a single round-robin within their respective groups (each team playing every other team once). The top four teams from Q1 and the top two teams from Q2 advanced to the Championship Playoffs.

=== Q1 ===
==== Table ====
Pos	Team	Pld	W	D	L	GF	GA	GD	Pts	
1	Virtus	6	5	1	0	15	3	+12	16	Qualification to Championship play-offs
2	Pennarossa	6	4	1	1	12	5	+7	13	Qualification to Championship play-offs
3	Cailungo	6	3	1	2	9	7	+2	10	Qualification to Championship play-offs
4	La Fiorita	6	2	2	2	8	8	0	8	Qualification to Championship play-offs
5	Juvenes/Dogana	6	2	1	3	7	9	−2	7	
6	Domagnano	6	1	1	4	5	11	−6	4	
7	Cosmos	6	0	1	5	3	16	−13	1	

Updated to match(es) played on unknown. Source: FSGC

==== Results ====
Home \ Away	CAI	COS	DOM	FIO	JUV	PEN	VIR
Cailungo							
Cosmos							
Domagnano							
La Fiorita							
Juvenes/Dogana							
Pennarossa							
Virtus							

Updated to match(es) played on unknown. Source:
Legend: Blue = home team win; Yellow = draw; Red = away team win.

=== Q2 ===
==== Table ====
Pos	Team	Pld	W	D	L	GF	GA	GD	Pts	
1	Folgore	7	5	2	0	16	4	+12	17	Qualification to Championship play-offs
2	Tre Fiori	7	5	1	1	14	5	+9	16	Qualification to Championship play-offs
3	Murata	7	4	1	2	11	7	+4	13	
4	Libertas	7	3	2	2	10	8	+2	11	
5	Faetano	7	2	2	3	8	10	−2	8	
6	Tre Penne	7	2	1	4	7	11	−4	7	
7	San Giovanni	7	1	1	5	5	14	−9	4	
8	Fiorentino	7	0	2	5	3	15	−12	2	

Updated to match(es) played on unknown. Source: FSGC

==== Results ====
Home \ Away	FAE	FIR	FOL	LIB	MUR	SGI	TRE	TFI
Faetano								
Fiorentino								
Folgore								
Libertas								
Murata								
San Giovanni								
Tre Penne								
Tre Fiori								

Updated to match(es) played on unknown. Source:
Legend: Blue = home team win; Yellow = draw; Red = away team win.

== Championship play-offs ==
The top four teams from Q1 and the top two teams from Q2 competed in the single-elimination Championship Play-offs. The top two seeds from Q1 (Virtus and Pennarossa) received a bye directly to the semi-finals.

=== Bracket ===
Quarter-finals
Q1-3	Cailungo	2
Q2-2	Tre Fiori	1
Q1-4	La Fiorita	2
Q2-1	Folgore	0

Semi-finals
Q1-1	Virtus	3
Q1-3	Cailungo	0
Q1-2	Pennarossa	2
Q1-4	La Fiorita	1

Final
Q1-1	Virtus	2
Q1-2	Pennarossa	0

=== Quarter-finals ===
Cailungo	2–1	Tre Fiori

Stadio Fonte dell'Ovo, San Marino

La Fiorita	2–0	Folgore

Stadio Fonte dell'Ovo, San Marino

=== Semi-finals ===
Virtus	3–0	Cailungo

Stadio Olimpico, Serravalle

Pennarossa	2–1	La Fiorita

Stadio Olimpico, Serravalle

=== Final ===
Virtus	2–0	Pennarossa

Stadio Olimpico, Serravalle
