= 2018–19 Coppa Titano =

Tournament details
- Country: San Marino
- Teams: 15

Final positions
- Champions: Tre Fiori
- Runners-up: Folgore

Tournament statistics
- Matches played: 27
- Goals scored: 72 (2.67 per match)

The 2018–19 Coppa Titano was the 61st edition of the football competition in San Marino. The cup was contested under a new format this season. The competition began on 23 October 2018 and ended on 19 April 2019.

S.P. La Fiorita were the defending cup champions after winning the previous tournament by defeating S. P. Tre Penne in the final by the score of 3–2 after extra time.

== Format ==
The draw for the opening round was held on 30 August 2018. The final was contested over one leg, all other rounds were contested over two legs. When a winner was not determined in regular time, extra time and then penalties were used to determine a winner.

== First round ==
The first legs of the first round were played on 23–24 October 2018, and the second legs were played on 6–7 November 2018. The draw for the first round was held on 30 August 2018.

Team 1	Agg.	Team 2	1st leg	2nd leg
Fiorentino	2–4	Tre Fiori	0–4	2–0
Domagnano	0–1	Folgore	0–1	0–0
Murata	5–2	Faetano	1–1	4–1
San Giovanni	2–2 (a.e.t.) (9–10 p)	Libertas	1–0	1–2
Pennarossa	3–5	Cosmos	2–3	1–2
Tre Penne	8–3	Juvenes/Dogana	3–2	5–1
Virtus	0–4	Cailungo	0–1	0–3

== Quarter–finals ==
The first legs of the quarter–finals were played on 4–5 December 2018, and the second legs were played on 16 December 2018.

Team 1	Agg.	Team 2	1st leg	2nd leg
Tre Penne	6–1	Cailungo	3–1	3–0
Cosmos	2–5 (a.e.t.)	Folgore	2–0	0–5
La Fiorita	1–2	Tre Fiori	1–1	0–1
Murata	1–4	Libertas	0–1	1–3

== Semi–finals ==
The first legs of the semi–finals will be played on 6–7 April 2019, and the second legs will be played on 13–14 April 2019.

Team 1	Agg.	Team 2	1st leg	2nd leg
Tre Fiori	4–1	Libertas	2–0	2–1
Tre Penne	1–2	Folgore	0–0	1–2

== Final ==
The final was played 19 April 2019.

19 April 2019
20:45

Tre Fiori	1–0	Folgore

San Marino Stadium, Serravalle
Referee: Gianluca Ceccarelli

== Bracket ==
First round
23 October/7 November
Fiorentino	0	2	2
Tre Fiori	4	0	4
24 October/6 November
San Giovanni	1	1	2
Libertas (p)	0	2	2
24 October/6 November
Murata	1	4	5
Faetano	1	1	2
24 October/7 November
Tre Penne	3	5	8
Juvenes/Dogana	2	1	3
24 October/7 November
Virtus	0	0	0
Cailungo	1	3	4
24 October/6 November
Pennarossa	2	1	3
Cosmos	3	2	5
23 October/6 November
Domagnano	0	0	0
Folgore	1	0	1

Second round
La Fiorita	1	0	1
Tre Fiori	1	1	2
Libertas	1	3	4
Murata	0	1	1
Tre Penne	3	3	6
Cailungo	1	0	1
Cosmos	2	0	2
Folgore	0	5	5

Semi-finals
Tre Fiori	2	2	4
Libertas	0	1	1
Tre Penne	0	1	1
Folgore	0	2	2

Final
Tre Fiori	1
Folgore	0

== See also ==
- 2018–19 Campionato Sammarinese di Calcio
