= 2001–02 Campionato Sammarinese di Calcio =

Campionato Sammarinese di Calcio
- Season: 2001–02
- Champions: F.C. Domagnano

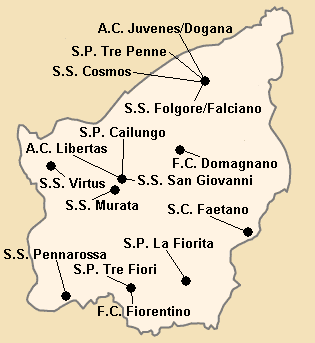
2001–02 Campionato Sammarinese di Calcio team distribution

The 2001–02 Campionato Sammarinese di Calcio season was the 17th season since its establishment. It was contested by 15 teams, and F.C. Domagnano won the championship.

== Regular season ==
=== Group A ===
Pos	Team	Pld	W	D	L	GF	GA	GD	Pts	Qualification
1	Cailungo	21	11	7	3	31	18	+13	40	Qualification for the championship play–offs
2	Domagnano	21	10	6	5	36	27	+9	36	Qualification for the championship play–offs
3	Faetano	21	10	5	6	27	22	+5	35	Qualification for the championship play–offs
4	Virtus	21	10	5	6	40	24	+16	35	
5	Folgore/Falciano	21	8	4	9	37	37	0	28	
6	San Giovanni	21	6	6	9	27	35	−8	24	
7	La Fiorita	21	1	6	14	12	42	−30	9	
8	Juvenes/Dogana	21	0	3	18	13	59	−46	3	

Source: rsssf.com

=== Group B ===
Pos	Team	Pld	W	D	L	GF	GA	GD	Pts	Qualification
1	Cosmos	20	15	4	1	46	16	+30	49	Qualification for the championship play–offs
2	Pennarossa	20	14	4	2	41	19	+22	46	Qualification for the championship play–offs
3	Libertas	20	13	3	4	38	18	+20	42	Qualification for the championship play–offs
4	Murata	20	10	3	7	40	27	+13	33	
5	Tre Fiori	20	5	3	12	21	30	−9	18	
6	Montevito	20	4	6	10	27	38	−11	18	
7	Tre Penne	20	1	7	12	16	40	−24	10	

Source: rsssf.com

=== Results ===
All teams play twice against the teams within their own group and once against the teams from the other group.

Home \ Away	CAI	COS	DOM	FAE	FOL	J/D	LFI	LIB	MON	MUR	PEN	SGI	TFI	TPE	VIR
Cailungo		0–3	2–1	4–1	3–1	3–0	2–0			1–3	1–0	1–1			0–0
Cosmos					2–0	8–1	3–0	0–0	3–2	2–1	0–1		3–1	6–3	3–2
Domagnano	0–1	0–0		0–0	3–2	3–1	1–1	2–1	2–1			3–1	1–0		1–1
Faetano	0–0	0–1	1–1		0–4	1–0	0–0			0–1		5–3	1–0	1–0	1–1
Folgore	0–0		2–3	1–3		5–0	2–1	2–1			0–2	1–2	2–1	1–1	3–5
Juvenes/Dogana	1–3		1–6	0–3	1–2		0–0		1–2		0–1	2–5		0–1	1–3
La Fiorita	1–1		0–1	0–2	1–4	1–1		1–2	0–4	1–3		0–2			0–5
Libertas	3–0	0–0		1–3		4–1			2–0	4–1	0–2		2–0	3–2	2–0
Montevito	1–1	0–2		0–1	2–2			0–4		1–1	4–5	0–2	1–3	2–1	
Murata		2–4	4–2		0–1	3–0		3–4	2–3		0–1	3–1	4–1	0–0	
Pennarossa		0–1	4–2	2–1			4–2	1–1	1–1	1–1			3–2	2–2	3–0
San Giovanni	1–4	1–1	0–0	2–1	2–2	0–0	0–1	0–2			1–2		0–4		0–1
Tre Fiori	0–2	1–2				3–1	1–0	0–1	1–1	0–2	0–3			1–1	0–0
Tre Penne	1–1	1–2	1–4				1–1	0–1	1–1	0–4	0–3	0–1	0–2		
Virtus	0–1		3–0	1–2	4–0	2–1	3–1		3–1	0–2		2–2		4–0	

Legend: Blue = home team win; Yellow = draw; Red = away team win.

== Championship playoffs ==
=== First round ===
Team 1	Score	Team 2
Pennarossa	1–2	Faetano
Domagnano	4–2	Libertas

=== Second round ===
Team 1	Score	Team 2
Cailungo	3–0	Faetano
Cosmos	1–0	Domagnano

=== Third round ===
Team 1	Score	Team 2
Faetano	1–2	Libertas
Domagnano	1–0	Pennarossa

=== Fourth round ===
Team 1	Score	Team 2
Cailungo	2–1	Cosmos
Libertas	1–3	Domagnano

=== Semifinal ===
Team 1	Score	Team 2
Cosmos	0–1	Domagnano

=== Final ===
Team 1	Score	Team 2
Cailungo	0–1	Domagnano
