= 2020–21 Campionato Sammarinese di Calcio =

Campionato Sammarinese di Calcio
- Season: 2020–21
- Dates: 12 September 2020 – 22 May 2021
- Champions: Folgore
- Champions League: Folgore
- Conference League: La Fiorita; Tre Penne
- Matches: 115
- Goals: 316 (2.75 per match)

The 2020–21 Campionato Sammarinese di Calcio was the 36th edition of league competition in San Marino, in which the country's top 15 amateur football teams participate. The season began on 12 September 2020 and ended on 22 May 2021.

The previous season was abandoned due to the COVID-19 pandemic in San Marino. Tre Fiori were declared champions based on league position at the time of abandonment and selected to play in the 2020–21 UEFA Champions League.

The league winner will qualify for the 2021–22 UEFA Champions League preliminary round.

After a delay due to the COVID-19 pandemic, the league restarted on 24 February 2021. Teams will now play each other once instead of twice in order to finish the league on 22 May 2021.

== Participating teams ==
Because there is no promotion or relegation in the league, the same 15 teams who competed in the league the previous season competed in the league again this season.

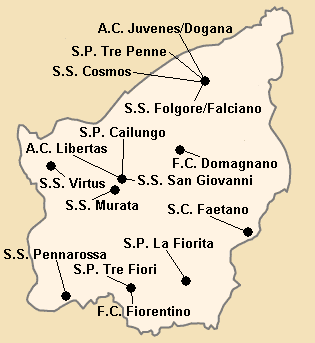
2020–21 Campionato Sammarinese di Calcio team distribution

- Cailungo (Borgo Maggiore)
- Cosmos (Serravalle)
- Domagnano (Domagnano)
- Faetano (Faetano)
- Fiorentino (Fiorentino)
- Folgore (Serravalle)
- Juvenes/Dogana (Serravalle)
- La Fiorita (Montegiardino)
- Libertas (Borgo Maggiore)
- Murata (San Marino)
- Pennarossa (Chiesanuova)
- San Giovanni (Borgo Maggiore)
- Tre Fiori (Fiorentino)
- Tre Penne (Serravalle)
- Virtus (Acquaviva)

== First phase ==
The regular season will be contested in a 15-team group where teams will play each other once. This was changed from the original format of playing each other twice. Eight teams will advance to the second phase. The top four teams at the end of the first phase advance to the second phase and the next eight teams will play for the other four spots in the second phase.

=== League table ===
Pos	Team	Pld	W	D	L	GF	GA	GD	Pts	Qualification
1	La Fiorita	14	12	1	1	34	5	+29	37	Qualification for the second phase and Europa Conference League first qualifying round
2	Libertas	14	9	2	3	21	11	+10	29	Qualification for the second phase
3	Folgore	14	8	3	3	25	10	+15	27	Qualification for the second phase
4	Tre Penne	14	9	0	5	30	20	+10	27	Qualification for the second phase
5	Tre Fiori	14	7	5	2	26	11	+15	26	Qualification for the play–offs
6	Pennarossa	14	6	3	5	15	15	0	21	Qualification for the play–offs
7	San Giovanni	14	5	4	5	17	20	−3	19	Qualification for the play–offs
8	Juvenes/Dogana	14	6	1	7	23	34	−11	19	Qualification for the play–offs
9	Murata	14	4	6	4	14	9	+5	18	Qualification for the play–offs
10	Virtus	14	4	6	4	14	12	+2	18	Qualification for the play–offs
11	Fiorentino	14	4	4	6	18	26	−8	16	Qualification for the play–offs
12	Domagnano	14	2	6	6	16	26	−10	12	Qualification for the play–offs
13	Faetano	14	2	4	8	14	26	−12	10	
14	Cailungo	14	2	2	10	17	29	−12	8	
15	Cosmos	14	1	1	12	10	40	−30	4	

Source: soccerway.com
Rules for classification: 1) Points; 2) Goal difference; 3) Goals scored; 4) Head-to-head points; 5) head-to-head goal difference; 6) Head-to-head goals scored.

=== Results ===
Home \ Away	CAI	COS	DOM	FAE	FTO	FOL	JUV	LFI	LIB	MUR	PEN	SGI	TFI	TPE	VIR
Cailungo		3–0				0–1			2–3	1–2	1–1	0–1			1–2
Cosmos			1–1			0–5	2–5	0–3	0–2		1–2		1–6		0–1
Domagnano	2–3				1–2	2–2	0–2				2–2	3–1			0–0
Faetano	1–0	1–2	2–2		0–1				1–2			1–1		2–4	
Fiorentino	1–1	5–2						0–4	0–0	0–0	0–1		2–2		
Folgore				2–0	2–1			0–1				3–0	1–0	1–1	1–1
Juvenes/Dogana	4–0			3–2	2–4	1–6				1–1		2–1		2–1	0–2
La Fiorita	7–2		3–0	3–0			6–0		1–0			2–1	1–0		
Libertas			3–0			2–1	3–0				2–0			0–3	1–0
Murata		3–0	1–2	0–0		0–0		1–0	0–1		0–1				1–1
Pennarossa				1–2		2–0	2–1	0–1					1–1	1–3	
San Giovanni		1–0			4–1				0–0	0–4	1–0		1–1	4–2	
Tre Fiori	3–1		0–0	3–0			4–0		3–2	0–0				2–1	
Tre Penne	3–2	2–1	4–3		4–0			0–1		2–1					
Virtus				2–2	3–1			1–1			0–1	1–1	0–1	0–1	

Source: soccerway.com
Legend: Blue = home team win; Yellow = draw; Red = away team win.

=== Play–offs ===
The play–offs were contested on 1–2 May 2021 by the teams which finished from fifth to twelfth in the first phase. When a match ends in a draw, the team with the better regular season position advances.

Team 1	Score	Team 2
Pennarossa	0–0	Fiorentino
Juvenes/Dogana	0–3	Virtus
Tre Fiori	0–2	Domagnano
San Giovanni	0–3	Murata

== Second phase ==
=== Quarter–finals ===
The quarter–finals were contested on 5–6 May 2021 by the first four teams from the first phase and the four play–off winners.

Team 1	Score	Team 2
Pennarossa	1–2	Tre Penne
Virtus	2–3	Libertas
Folgore	1–1	Murata
La Fiorita	0–0	Domagnano

=== Semi–finals ===
The semi–finals were played 10–11 May 2021.

Team 1	Score	Team 2
La Fiorita	1–0	Tre Penne
Folgore	3–1	Libertas

=== Third place ===
21 May 2021
20:45

Tre Penne	1–0	Libertas

Tre Penne qualified for the 2021-22 UEFA Europa Conference League first qualifying round.

=== Final ===
22 May 2021
20:45

La Fiorita	0–1 (a.e.t.)	Folgore

San Marino Stadium, Serravalle
Referee: Andrea Mei

Folgore qualified for the 2021–22 UEFA Champions League preliminary round. La Fiorita qualified for the 2021-22 UEFA Europa Conference League first qualifying round by winning the 2020–21 Coppa Titano.
