= 2022–23 Coppa Titano =

Tournament details
- Country: San Marino
- Teams: 15

Final positions
- Champions: Virtus
- Runners-up: Tre Penne
- Semifinalists: Folgore; Libertas

Tournament statistics
- Matches played: 27
- Goals scored: 79 (2.93 per match)

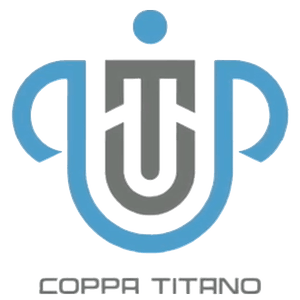
Coppa Titano logo

The 2022–23 Coppa Titano is the sixty-fifth edition of the football competition in San Marino. The winners of the cup will qualify for a place in the 2023–24 UEFA Europa Conference League.

Tre Fiori are the defending champions after winning the previous season's cup by gaining a 3–1 win over Folgore. Defending champions Tre Fiori were knocked out in the quarter-finals by eventual winners Virtus.

== First round ==
The first legs of the first round were played on 4–5 October 2022, while the second legs were played on 18–19 October 2022. The draw for the first round was held on 30 August 2021. Tre Fiori received a bye in the first round by virtue of being the defending champions.

Team 1	Agg.	Team 2	1st leg	2nd leg
Fiorentino	1–8	La Fiorita	0–5	1–3
Cosmos	1–2	Virtus	0–1	1–1
Domagnano	2–8	Libertas	0–2	2–6
Faetano	3–5	Murata	3–1	0–4
San Giovanni	2–3	Folgore	0–0	2–3
Tre Penne	4–1	Pennarossa	0–0	4–1
Juvenes/Dogana	3–2	Cailungo	2–1	1–1

== Quarter–finals ==
The first legs of the quarter–finals were played on 30 November 2022, while the second legs were played on 14 December 2022.

Team 1	Agg.	Team 2	1st leg	2nd leg
Tre Fiori	2–3	Virtus	1–0	1–3
Tre Penne	4–3	Juvenes/Dogana	1–3	3–0
Murata	4–3	Folgore	1–1	2–3
Libertas	2–1	La Fiorita	1–1	1–0

== Semi–finals ==
The two legs of the semi–finals were played, respectively, on 25 January and 8 February 2023.

Team 1	Agg.	Team 2	1st leg	2nd leg
Virtus	3–1	Folgore	3–0	0–1
Tre Penne	4–0	Libertas	2–0	2–0

== Final ==
The final was played on 27 May 2023.

27 May 2023
20:45

Virtus	3–1	Tre Penne
	Report

Stadio di Acquaviva, Acquaviva
Referee: Antonio Ucini

Match rules

- 90 minutes
- 30 minutes of extra time if necessary
- Penalty shoot-out if scores still level
- Maximum of seven named substitutes
- Maximum of five substitutions, with a sixth allowed in extra time

== See also ==
- 2022–23 Campionato Sammarinese di Calcio
