= 2007–08 Coppa Titano =

The 2007–08 Coppa Titano was the 53rd edition of the Sammarinese football tournament. It started on September 14, 2007 and ended with the final on May 2, 2008. The final saw Murata defeat Juvenes/Dogana by a score of one to zero.

The winner of the tournament would receive a spot in the 2008–09 UEFA Cup tournament. Because Murata also won the Campionato Sammarinese, they received a spot in the Champions League, awarding the UEFA Cup qualification to Juvenes/Dogana.

== Group stage ==
All games were played during September 14, 2007 and April 2, 2008.

=== Group A ===
Team	Pld	W	D	L	GF	GA	GD	Pts
Juvenes/Dogana	8	4	4	0	13	3	+10	16
Cosmos	8	4	2	2	15	8	+7	14
Faetano	8	4	1	3	13	10	+3	13
San Giovanni	8	3	0	5	9	17	-8	9
Fiorentino	8	1	1	6	11	23	-12	4

=== Group B ===
Team	Pld	W	D	L	GF	GA	GD	Pts
Cailungo	8	4	3	1	11	7	+4	15
Tre Penne	8	4	1	3	18	11	+7	13
Libertas	8	4	1	3	14	19	+5	13
La Fiorita	8	3	3	2	16	13	+3	12
Folgore/Falciano	8	0	2	6	4	23	-19	2

=== Group C ===
Team	Pld	W	D	L	GF	GA	GD	Pts
Tre Fiori	8	6	1	1	16	5	+11	19
Murata	8	4	1	3	14	11	+3	13
Domagnano	8	2	3	3	10	15	-5	9
Virtus	8	2	2	4	15	18	-3	8
Pennarossa	8	2	1	5	17	23	-6	7

== Stage Two ==
=== Quarterfinals ===
Games played on April 24, 2008.

Team 1	Score	Team 2
Juvenes/Dogana	2-1	Libertas
Tre Fiori	4-2	Tre Penne
Cailungo	1-2	Faetano
Murata	3-0	Cosmos

=== Semifinals ===
Games played on April 28, 2008.

Team 1	Score	Team 2
Juvenes/Dogana	6-2	Tre Fiori
Faetano	0-2	Murata

=== Final ===
Game played on May 2, 2008 at Serravalle Stadium.

Team 1	Score	Team 2
Juvenes/Dogana	0-1	Murata
