= 2010–11 Coppa Titano =

Football competition in San Marino

The 2010-11 Coppa Titano was the fifty-third season of San Marino's oldest football competition. It began on 11 September 2010 with the first games of the Group Stage and ended in 2011 with the Final held at Stadio Olimpico, Serravalle. Tre Fiori were the defending champions, having won their sixth cup final last season.

The winner of the cup final will enter the second qualifying round of UEFA Europa League.

== Competition format ==
The competition consisted of two stages, the Group Stage and the Elimination Rounds. The Group Stage consisted of three groups with five teams each. Every team played two games (once "home" and once "away") against every other team of its group. The top two teams from each group, as well as the two best third-placed teams, qualified for the Elimination Rounds. The Elimination Rounds was a single-game elimination tournament. Games in the Elimination Rounds were decided by extra time and, if necessary, a penalty shootout.

== Group stage ==
=== Group A ===
Pos	Team	Pld	W	D	L	GF	GA	GD	Pts	VIR	PEN	FOL	LIB	CAI
1	Virtus	8	5	3	0	17	9	+8	18		2–1	3–0	0–0	2–2
2	Pennarossa	8	4	1	3	14	12	+2	13 (Note: PEN 0-0 FOL; FOL 0-1 PEN)	3–5		0–0	4–2	2–0
3	Folgore	8	4	1	3	10	8	+2	13	1–2	0–1		3–0	1–0
4	Libertas	8	1	3	4	8	14	−6	6	2–2	1–2	1–2		1–1
5	Cailungo	8	1	2	5	6	12	−6	5	0–1	2–1	1–3	0–1	

Source: Classification and Results (in Italian)
Rules for classification: 1) points; 2) head-to-head points; 3) head-to-head goal difference; 4) head-to-head goals scored; 5) goal difference; 6) number of goals scored.

=== Group B ===
Pos	Team	Pld	W	D	L	GF	GA	GD	Pts	TFI	COS	DOM	LFI	FAE
1	Tre Fiori	8	3	4	1	9	10	−1	13		1–1	0–5	2–2	1–0
2	Cosmos	8	3	3	2	8	8	0	12	0–2		1–1	1–3	2–0
3	Domagnano	8	3	2	3	14	8	+6	11	0–1	0–1		3–3	0–1
4	La Fiorita	8	2	3	3	16	17	−1	9	1–1	1–2	0–2		3–2
5	Faetano	8	2	2	4	9	13	−4	8	1–1	0–0	1–3	4–3	

Source: Classification and Results (in Italian)
Rules for classification: 1) points; 2) head-to-head points; 3) head-to-head goal difference; 4) head-to-head goals scored; 5) goal difference; 6) number of goals scored.

=== Group C ===
Pos	Team	Pld	W	D	L	GF	GA	GD	Pts	J/D	MUR	TPE	FIO	SGI
1	Juvenes/Dogana	8	4	2	2	18	12	+6	14		0–2	2–2	3–0	4–2
2	Murata	8	3	4	1	13	10	+3	13	1–3		1–1	1–1	2–2
3	Tre Penne	8	2	5	1	14	10	+4	11 (Note: TPE 2-2 FIO; FIO 1-2 TPE)	1–1	1–1		2–2	5–1
4	Fiorentino	8	3	2	3	10	12	−2	11	2–1	1–2	1–2		2–1
5	San Giovanni	8	1	1	6	10	21	−11	4	2–4	1–3	1–0	0–1	

Source: Classification and Results (in Italian)
Rules for classification: 1) points; 2) head-to-head points; 3) head-to-head goal difference; 4) head-to-head goals scored; 5) goal difference; 6) number of goals scored.

== Elimination rounds ==
=== Quarterfinals ===
These matches took place on 21 April 2011.

Team 1	Score	Team 2
Juvenes/Dogana	3–1	Folgore/Falciano
Tre Fiori	1–1 (a.e.t.) (p) 4–6	Pennarossa
Cosmos	0–5	Murata
Virtus	1–0 (a.e.t.)	Domagnano

=== Semifinals ===
These matches took place on 26 April 2011.

Team 1	Score	Team 2
Juvenes/Dogana	1–0	Pennarossa
Virtus	2–1	Murata

=== Final ===
30 April 2011
21:00 CEST

Juvenes/Dogana	4–1	Virtus
Ceci 17'; Santini 35'; Hirsch 65' (o.g.); Colombini 84'		79' Hirsch

Stadio Olimpico, Serravalle
