= 1996–97 Campionato Sammarinese di Calcio =

Campionato Sammarinese di Calcio
- Season: 1996–97
- Champions: S.S. Folgore/Falciano

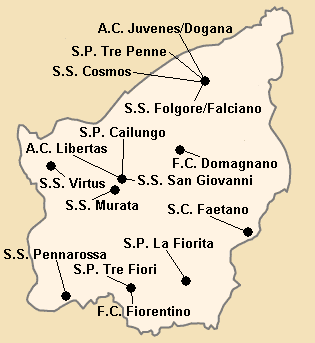
1996–97 Campionato Sammarinese di Calcio team distribution

The 1996–97 Campionato Sammarinese di Calcio season was the 12th season since its establishment. It was contested by 16 teams, and S.S. Folgore/Falciano won the championship.

== Regular season ==
=== Group A ===
Pos	Team	Pld	W	D	L	GF	GA	GD	Pts	Qualification
1	S.S. Folgore/Falciano	22	15	3	4	42	24	+18	48	Qualification for the championship play–offs
2	S.P. La Fiorita	22	11	5	6	37	17	+20	38	Qualification for the championship play–offs
3	S.P. Cailungo	22	9	8	5	38	19	+19	35	Qualification for the championship play–offs
4	S.P. Tre Penne	22	9	8	5	25	20	+5	35	
5	S.P. Tre Fiori	22	8	10	4	42	24	+18	34	
6	S.S. Cosmos	22	7	9	6	28	24	+4	30	
7	S.S. Juvenes	22	4	6	12	19	37	−18	18	
8	G.S. Dogana	22	0	4	18	11	73	−62	4	

Source: rsssf.com

=== Group B ===
Pos	Team	Pld	W	D	L	GF	GA	GD	Pts	Qualification
1	S.S. Virtus	22	14	5	3	35	16	+19	47	Qualification for the championship play–offs
2	S.C. Faetano	22	11	5	6	39	22	+17	38	Qualification for the championship play–offs
3	A.C. Libertas	22	11	4	7	41	25	+16	37	Qualification for the championship play–offs
4	S.S. Murata	22	10	6	6	43	17	+26	36	
5	F.C. Domagnano	22	7	9	6	21	20	+1	30	
6	S.S. Pennarossa	22	8	5	9	34	33	+1	29	
7	S.S. Montevito	22	2	8	12	23	43	−20	14	
8	S.S. San Giovanni	22	1	3	18	12	76	−64	6	

Source: rsssf.com

=== Results ===
All teams play twice against the teams within their own group and once against the teams from the other group.

Home \ Away	CAI	COS	DOG	DOM	FAE	FOL	JUV	LFI	LIB	MON	MUR	PEN	SGI	TFI	TPE	VIR
Cailungo		4–0	6–0	0–0	0–2	2–0	3–1	1–1	0–0					0–1	1–0	0–1
Cosmos	1–1		2–2	0–0	1–1	0–1	3–0	2–2		1–1			3–0	1–0	1–0	
Dogana	0–3	1–7		2–3		1–3	0–2	0–4		0–0		0–5		0–3	0–3	2–2
Domagnano					1–3		2–0	0–2	1–0	1–1	1–2	0–0	1–0	0–0	0–0	1–3
Faetano			1–0	0–2		0–1			1–0	6–1	0–0	2–0	7–1	0–0	1–1	0–1
Folgore	2–2	2–0	3–0	2–0			3–2	0–1			1–0	3–2		0–3	1–1	
Juvenes	0–4	0–1	1–1		0–1	0–1		2–0	1–4	3–1	1–5			2–4	1–1	
La Fiorita	1–0	3–1	3–0		4–0	1–2	1–2		2–3		1–0		0–0	1–1	0–1	
Libertas		1–1	4–1	1–1	2–4	2–3				2–2	0–3	1–0	9–0	1–0	3–1	0–3
Montevito	1–2			1–2	1–1	2–1		1–4	0–2		0–4	0–2	4–0		1–2	1–2
Murata	1–1	0–0	6–0	2–1	1–4				0–1	1–1		1–0	3–0	1–1		0–0
Pennarossa	2–2	1–2		0–0	3–1		0–0	0–5	0–1	2–1	0–7		2–1			1–0
San Giovanni	0–2		2–1	0–3	1–4	2–6	0–0		0–4	2–2	0–6	0–5				0–3
Tre Fiori	2–2	3–1	8–0			2–2	1–1	0–0		1–1		4–3	5–3		0–1	1–1
Tre Penne	3–2	0–0	2–0			1–3	0–0	0–1			1–0	1–1	1–0	3–2		2–2
Virtus		1–0		1–1	1–0	0–2	1–0	1–0	1–0	2–0	3–0	1–5	5–0			

Legend: Blue = home team win; Yellow = draw; Red = away team win.

== Championship playoffs ==
=== First round ===
- S.P. La Fiorita 0-0 (pen 5-4) A.C. Libertas
- S.C. Faetano 4-3 S.P. Cailungo

=== Second round ===
- S.S. Virtus 2-3 S.P. La Fiorita
- S.C. Faetano 2-2 (pen 6-5) S.S. Folgore/Falciano

=== Third round ===
- S.S. Folgore/Falciano 3-1 A.C. Libertas
- S.P. Cailungo 3-2 S.S. Virtus

=== Fourth round ===
- S.P. La Fiorita 2-2 (pen 7-6) S.C. Faetano

=== Fifth Round ===
- S.S. Folgore/Falciano 2-1 S.P. Cailungo

=== Sixth Round ===
- S.S. Folgore/Falciano 2-0 S.C. Faetano

=== Final ===
- S.S. Folgore/Falciano 2-1 S.P. La Fiorita
