= 1991–92 Campionato Sammarinese di Calcio =

Annual soccer tournament

Campionato Sammarinese di Calcio
- Season: 1991–92
- Champions: S.S. Montevito

The 1991–92 Campionato Sammarinese di Calcio season was the 7th season since its establishment. It was contested by 10 teams, and S.S. Montevito won the championship.

== Regular season ==
Pos	Team	Pld	W	D	L	GF	GA	GD	Pts	Qualification or relegation
1	S.S. Montevito	18	10	5	3	28	22	+6	25	Qualification for the championship play–offs
2	S.P. Tre Fiori	18	8	7	3	27	14	+13	23	Qualification for the championship play–offs
3	A.C. Libertas	18	8	4	6	23	20	+3	20	Qualification for the championship play–offs
4	S.P. Cailungo	18	7	6	5	26	25	+1	20	Qualification for the championship play–offs
5	S.S. Murata	18	7	5	6	21	22	−1	19	
6	S.P. Domagnano	18	6	6	6	29	23	+6	18	
7	S.S. Juvenes	18	5	6	7	28	23	+5	16	
8	S.C. Faetano	18	5	5	8	22	25	−3	15	
9	S.S. Cosmos	18	6	3	9	21	30	−9	15	Relegation to the Serie A2
10	S.S. Folgore/Falciano	18	1	7	10	12	33	−21	9	Relegation to the Serie A2

Source: rsssf.com

=== Results ===
Home \ Away	CAI	COS	DOM	FAE	FOL	JUV	LIB	MON	MUR	TFI
Cailungo		0–0	2–0	0–0	4–1	2–5	2–4	2–3	0–3	0–0
Cosmos	0–0		0–2	1–1	1–0	2–7	2–1	0–2	3–0	0–3
Domagnano	1–2	2–3		4–2	6–1	2–1	1–2	1–1	0–0	0–3
Faetano	1–2	2–0	1–1		1–1	1–1	1–3	1–2	1–2	2–1
Folgore	2–3	0–2	0–0	1–3		0–0	0–0	1–3	2–1	0–4
Juvenes	0–1	2–1	2–3	0–2	1–0		1–2	1–2	0–0	2–2
Libertas	2–2	3–0	1–1	1–0	0–0	0–3		0–1	2–0	0–2
Montevito	1–1	3–2	0–4	1–0	0–0	3–2	0–1		3–1	0–0
Murata	1–3	2–1	1–1	0–1	2–1	0–0	2–1	4–2		1–1
Tre Fiori	1–0	0–3	1–0	4–2	2–2	0–0	2–0	1–1	0–1	

Legend: Blue = home team win; Yellow = draw; Red = away team win.

== Championship playoff ==
=== First round ===
- S.P. Cailungo 2-2 (pen 4-2) S.P. Tre Penne
- S.P. Tre Fiori 2-2 (pen 2-4) A.C. Libertas

=== Second round ===
- S.P. Tre Penne 1-0 S.P. Tre Fiori
- S.P. Cailungo 2-3 A.C. Libertas

=== Third round ===
- S.P. Cailungo 0-0 (pen 4-5) S.P. Tre Penne
- S.S. Montevito 0-3 A.C. Libertas

=== Semifinal ===
- S.S. Montevito 4-1 S.P. Tre Penne

=== Final ===
- S.S. Montevito 4-2 A.C. Libertas
