= 2006–07 Campionato Sammarinese di Calcio =

Campionato Sammarinese di Calcio
- Season: 2006–07

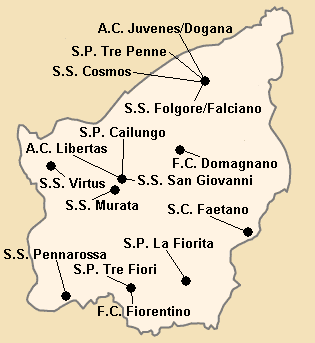
2006–07 Campionato Sammarinese di Calcio team distribution

The 2006–07 Campionato Sammarinese di Calcio season was the twenty-second season since its establishment.

== Regular season ==
=== Group A ===
Pos	Team	Pld	W	D	L	GF	GA	GD	Pts	Qualification
1	Tre Fiori	20	16	1	3	45	17	+28	49	Qualification for the championship play–offs
2	La Fiorita	20	11	3	6	38	23	+15	36	Qualification for the championship play–offs
3	Pennarossa	20	10	4	6	30	24	+6	34	Qualification for the championship play–offs
4	Virtus	20	9	3	8	35	30	+5	30	
5	Tre Penne	20	9	3	8	30	26	+4	30	
6	Cosmos	20	6	4	10	34	42	−8	22	
7	Cailungo	20	2	6	12	19	42	−23	12	

Source: Soccerway.com
Rules for classification: 1) points; 2) head-to-head points; 3) head-to-head goal difference; 4) head-to-head goals scored; 5) goal difference; 6) number of goals scored.

=== Group B ===
Pos	Team	Pld	W	D	L	GF	GA	GD	Pts	Qualification
1	Libertas	21	14	1	6	57	26	+31	43	Qualification for the championship play–offs
2	Domagnano	21	12	6	3	42	20	+22	42	Qualification for the championship play–offs
3	Murata	21	11	5	5	45	21	+24	38	Qualification for the championship play–offs
4	Folgore/Falciano	21	9	6	6	32	32	0	33	
5	Faetano	21	7	3	11	27	46	−19	24	
6	Juvenes/Dogana	21	6	5	10	28	39	−11	23	
7	San Giovanni	21	4	1	16	27	61	−34	13	
8	Fiorentino	21	1	3	17	23	63	−40	6	

Source: Soccerway.com
Rules for classification: 1) points; 2) head-to-head points; 3) head-to-head goal difference; 4) head-to-head goals scored; 5) goal difference; 6) number of goals scored.

=== Results ===
All teams play twice against the teams within their own group and once against the teams from the other group.

Home \ Away	CAI	COS	DOM	FAE	FIO	FOL	J/D	LFI	LIB	MUR	PEN	SGI	TFI	TPE	VIR
Cailungo		2–3	0–3	1–1			2–1	0–1			1–2		2–3	0–3	1–2
Cosmos	1–1		0–0	0–1	3–1			1–3	2–5	1–2	1–1		1–6	4–0	2–4
Domagnano				2–0	5–1	0–0	0–0	3–1	1–0	1–1		3–1	1–3		2–3
Faetano			1–6		1–0	0–3	3–0		1–5	0–0		3–1	0–2	2–4	
Fiorentino	2–2		0–2	2–3		1–2	4–2		1–4	0–3	0–3	1–2			0–4
Folgore	0–0	1–4	1–1	1–1	2–1		0–2		1–4	1–3		2–1			
Juvenes/Dogana		2–1	1–2	1–3	3–1	1–4			0–1	0–0	1–1	2–0		1–1	1–4
La Fiorita	2–3	4–0		3–0	2–2	0–1	2–1				3–1	3–0	2–0	0–1	2–1
Libertas	7–1		0–0	3–0	4–1	4–1	5–1	1–2		0–1	1–2	4–1		2–1	
Murata	1–1		3–4	4–0	7–0	0–1	1–3	3–3	4–0		1–0	3–0			
Pennarossa	4–0	2–3	2–1	2–1		2–2		1–0				2–1	1–0	1–0	1–1
San Giovanni	2–0	1–6	1–2	6–4	5–3	3–3	1–2		1–4	0–3			0–2		
Tre Fiori	2–1	2–0			2–0	1–0	3–3	2–1	4–2	4–0	1–0			1–2	3–0
Tre Penne	2–1	0–0	1–3		2–2	1–3		1–3		2–1	3–0	5–0	0–1		0–1
Virtus	0–0	4–1		0–2		2–3		1–1	0–1	0–4	3–2	4–0	1–3	0–1	

Legend: Blue = home team win; Yellow = draw; Red = away team win.

== Championship play-offs ==
=== First round ===
The second place club will play the third place club from the opposite group.

Team 1	Score	Team 2
La Fiorita	0–4	Murata
Domagnano	3–3 (4–3 p)	Pennarossa

=== Second round ===
The first round winners play the first place clubs from each group.

Team 1	Score	Team 2
Tre Fiori	3–0	Domagnano
Libertas	2–1	Murata

=== Third round ===
The losers from the first and second round play each other. The losers from this round are eliminated.

Team 1	Score	Team 2
Domagnano	1–1 (10–9 p)	La Fiorita
Murata	3–0	Pennarossa

=== Fourth round ===
The second round winners play each other. The winner advances to the finals and loser moves to the semifinals.

Team 1	Score	Team 2
Tre Fiori	1–0	Libertas

The third round winners play each other and the loser is eliminated.

Team 1	Score	Team 2
Domagnano	0–4	Murata

=== Semifinal ===
The winner advances to the finals and the loser is eliminated.

Team 1	Score	Team 2
Libertas	0–5	Murata

Libertas were qualified for the first qualifying round of the 2007–08 UEFA Cup as runner-up of 2006–07 Coppa Titano.

=== Final ===
25 May 2007

Tre Fiori	0–4	Murata
		Agostini 52'; Teodorani 78', 86'; Zaboul 90+2'

Stadio Olimpico, Serravalle
Attendance: 1,326
Referee: Gabriele Rossi

Murata were qualified for the first qualifying round of the 2007–08 UEFA Champions League.
