= 2000–01 Campionato Sammarinese di Calcio =

Campionato Sammarinese di Calcio
- Season: 2000–01
- Champions: S.S. Cosmos

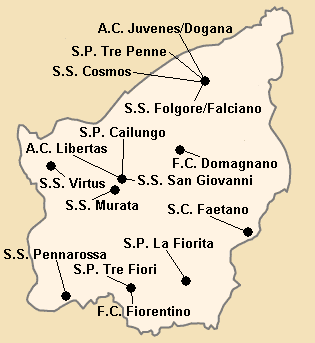
2000–01 Campionato Sammarinese di Calcio team distribution

The 2000–01 Campionato Sammarinese di Calcio season was the 16th season since its establishment. It was contested by 15 teams, and S.S. Cosmos won the championship.

== Regular season ==
=== Group A ===
Pos	Team	Pld	W	D	L	GF	GA	GD	Pts	Qualification
1	Cosmos	21	12	4	5	38	18	+20	40	Qualification for the championship play–offs
2	Faetano	21	10	6	5	38	26	+12	36	Qualification for the championship play–offs
3	Tre Penne	21	10	5	6	36	27	+9	35	Qualification for the championship play–offs
4	Domagnano	21	8	8	5	36	27	+9	32	
5	Cailungo	21	7	5	9	34	27	+7	26	
6	Libertas	21	7	5	9	46	47	−1	26	
7	Montevito	21	7	5	9	21	38	−17	26	
8	La Fiorita	21	2	6	13	24	51	−27	12	

Source: rsssf.com

=== Group B ===
Pos	Team	Pld	W	D	L	GF	GA	GD	Pts	Qualification
1	Virtus	20	12	6	2	45	23	+22	42	Qualification for the championship play–offs
2	Murata	20	10	5	5	25	22	+3	35	Qualification for the championship play–offs
3	Folgore/Falciano	20	9	6	5	34	19	+15	33	Qualification for the championship play–offs
4	Pennarossa	20	9	4	7	39	30	+9	31	
5	San Giovanni	20	7	7	6	27	32	−5	28	
6	Tre Fiori	20	2	4	14	25	50	−25	10	
7	Juvenes/Dogana	20	2	4	14	15	46	−31	10	

Source: rsssf.com

=== Results ===
All teams play twice against the teams within their own group and once against the teams from the other group.

Home \ Away	CAI	COS	DOM	FAE	FOL	J/D	LFI	LIB	MON	MUR	PEN	SGI	TFI	TPE	VIR
Cailungo		2–0	0–1	0–2		7–0	1–1	2–2	0–1				2–0	0–1	3–2
Cosmos	2–1		3–0	2–1	0–1	3–1	3–0	0–1	0–1		2–1			2–1	0–2
Domagnano	0–0	0–3		1–1	3–1		2–1	6–1	0–0	1–2		1–1		1–3	
Faetano	1–0	2–2	1–1			0–1	4–1	2–5	3–1	3–0	3–0	0–0		3–2	
Folgore	2–2			2–1		0–0		5–0		3–2	0–0	1–1	2–0	0–1	1–2
Juvenes/Dogana			1–3		0–2			2–2	1–2	0–2	0–7	0–2	2–1		0–1
La Fiorita	0–2	1–1	1–3	0–1	1–1	3–3		2–3	2–0			2–2		3–0	
Libertas	2–4	2–3	0–2	3–4			3–2		1–2	0–0	1–2		5–1	3–2	1–1
Montevito	2–1	0–0	2–2	1–3	1–1		1–0	0–7		1–3		0–1		0–3	1–3
Murata	2–1	0–2			0–2	1–0	1–1				2–1	1–1	2–1	0–0	1–1
Pennarossa	1–3		1–1		2–6	2–1	3–0		2–2	0–1		1–2	5–0		2–0
San Giovanni	4–2	0–7			1–0	1–1		3–3		1–2	2–3		2–1	0–2	0–1
Tre Fiori		1–3	3–3	1–1	0–3	2–1	5–1		1–3	0–2	1–2	1–2			2–5
Tre Penne	1–1	0–0	0–4	2–1		2–0	5–2	2–1	4–0		1–2		2–2		
Virtus			2–1	1–1	2–1	3–1	7–0			3–1	2–2	3–1	2–2	2–2	

Legend: Blue = home team win; Yellow = draw; Red = away team win.

== Championship playoffs ==
=== First round ===
Team 1	Score	Team 2
Folgore/Falciano	2–1	Faetano
Murata	3–0	Tre Penne

=== Second round ===
Team 1	Score	Team 2
Virtus	1–2	Folgore/Falciano
Cosmos	0–1	Murata

=== Third round ===
Team 1	Score	Team 2
Tre Penne	1–0	Virtus
Faetano	0–3	Cosmos

=== Fourth round ===
Team 1	Score	Team 2
Folgore/Falciano	2–0	Murata
Tre Penne	0–4	Cosmos

=== Semifinal ===
Team 1	Score	Team 2
Murata	0–1	Cosmos

=== Final ===
Team 1	Score	Team 2
Folgore/Falciano	1–3	Cosmos
