= 1989–90 Campionato Sammarinese di Calcio =

Campionato Sammarinese di Calcio
- Season: 1989–90
- Champions: S.P. La Fiorita

The 1989–90 Campionato Sammarinese di Calcio season was the 5th season since its establishment. It was contested by 10 teams, and S.P. La Fiorita won the championship.

== Regular season ==
| Pos | Team | Pld | W | D | L | GF | GA | GD | Pts | Qualification or relegation |
|---|---|---|---|---|---|---|---|---|---|---|
| 1 | S.P. La Fiorita | 18 | 12 | 5 | 1 | 37 | 14 | +23 | 29 | Qualification for the championship play–offs |
| 2 | S.P. Tre Fiori | 18 | 7 | 11 | 0 | 30 | 21 | +9 | 25 | Qualification for the championship play–offs |
| 3 | S.P. Domagnano | 18 | 8 | 7 | 3 | 25 | 18 | +7 | 23 | Qualification for the championship play–offs |
| 4 | A.C. Libertas | 18 | 8 | 6 | 4 | 32 | 21 | +11 | 22 | Qualification for the championship play–offs |
| 5 | S.S. Murata | 18 | 7 | 6 | 5 | 30 | 24 | +6 | 20 | |
| 6 | S.S. Folgore/Falciano | 18 | 5 | 9 | 4 | 20 | 14 | +6 | 19 | |
| 7 | S.C. Faetano | 18 | 6 | 4 | 8 | 31 | 23 | +8 | 16 | |
| 8 | S.S. Virtus | 18 | 5 | 3 | 10 | 22 | 32 | −10 | 13 | |
| 9 | G.S. Dogana | 18 | 2 | 3 | 13 | 23 | 44 | −21 | 7 | Relegation to the Serie A2 |
| 10 | S.P. Cailungo | 18 | 0 | 2 | 16 | 13 | 66 | −53 | 2 | Relegation to the Serie A2 |

Source: rsssf.com

== Championship playoff ==
=== First round ===
- F.C. Domagnano 2-2 (pen 4-6) A.C. Libertas
- S.S. Montevito 0-1 S.S. Cosmos

=== Second round ===
- F.C. Domagnano 1-0 S.S. Montevito
- A.C. Libertas 2-1 S.S. Cosmos

=== Third round ===
- F.C. Domagnano 1-2 S.S. Cosmos
- A.C. Libertas 1-1 (pen 6-4) S.P. Tre Fiori

=== Fourth round ===
- S.S. Cosmos 1-1 (pen 5-4) S.P. Tre Fiori
- S.P. La Fiorita 4-0 A.C. Libertas

=== Semifinal ===
- A.C. Libertas 1-3 S.S. Cosmos

=== Final ===
- S.P. La Fiorita 1-0 S.S. Cosmos
