= 1995–96 Campionato Sammarinese di Calcio =

Campionato Sammarinese di Calcio
- Season: 1995–96
- Champions: A.C. Libertas

The 1995–96 Campionato Sammarinese di Calcio season was the 11th season since its establishment. It was contested by 10 teams, and A.C. Libertas won the championship, despite playing their regular season in Serie A2.

== Regular season ==
Pos	Team	Pld	W	D	L	GF	GA	GD	Pts	Qualification
1	S.S. Cosmos	18	10	3	5	29	20	+9	33	Qualification for the championship play–offs
2	S.S. Murata	18	8	7	3	29	15	+14	31	Qualification for the championship play–offs
3	S.P. La Fiorita	18	8	5	5	23	17	+6	29	Qualification for the championship play–offs
4	S.S. San Giovanni	18	7	7	4	26	24	+2	28	Qualification for the championship play–offs
5	S.S. Folgore/Falciano	18	7	6	5	22	18	+4	27	
6	F.C. Domagnano	18	7	5	6	22	16	+6	26	
7	S.P. Tre Fiori	18	8	2	8	23	25	−2	26	
8	S.S. Virtus	18	5	6	7	22	26	−4	21	
9	S.P. Cailungo	18	3	6	9	20	32	−12	15	
10	S.C. Faetano	18	3	1	14	16	39	−23	10	

Source: rsssf.com

=== Results ===
Home \ Away	CAI	COS	DOM	FAE	FOL	LFI	MUR	SGI	TFI	VIR
Cailungo		1–0	2–2	1–2	0–1	1–1	1–3	0–2	1–0	1–1
Cosmos	1–1		1–0	4–1	0–3	3–1	2–1	1–1	3–0	2–1
Domagnano	3–1	1–0		2–0	1–2	1–0	1–1	2–2	3–0	0–1
Faetano	2–1	0–1	0–4		0–1	0–1	0–3	2–5	0–1	8–1
Folgore	2–4	1–3	0–0	1–0		1–1	1–1	0–0	0–1	3–1
La Fiorita	1–1	0–2	3–1	1–0	2–2		2–1	4–1	1–1	1–0
Murata	0–0	4–1	0–0	4–0	1–1	1–0		0–0	4–2	1–1
San Giovanni	2–1	1–4	0–1	2–0	1–0	1–0	3–2		1–3	2–2
Tre Fiori	4–1	2–0	1–0	5–0	0–3	0–2	0–1	2–2		0–3
Virtus	5–2	1–1	2–0	1–1	2–0	0–2	0–1	0–0	0–1	

Legend: Blue = home team win; Yellow = draw; Red = away team win.

== Championship playoff ==
=== First round ===
- S.S. San Giovanni 0-1 A.C. Libertas
- S.S. Murata 2-4 S.P. La Fiorita

=== Second round ===
- S.S. San Giovanni 2-0 S.S. Murata
- A.C. Libertas 2-2 (pen 4-3 ) S.P. La Fiorita

=== Third round ===
- A.C. Libertas 3-0 S.S. San Giovanni
- S.S. Cosmos 1-0 S.P. La Fiorita

=== Semifinal ===
- A.C. Libertas 4-3 S.P. La Fiorita

=== Final ===
- A.C. Libertas 4-1 S.S. Cosmos
