= 2009 Trofeo Federale =

The 2009 Trofeo Federale is the twenty-fourth edition of the San Marino four-club supercup competition. The competition will begin on 23 September 2009. The clubs involved are the league champions Tre Fiori, cup winners Juvenes/Dogana and cup runners-up Domagnano. Because Juvenes/Dogana were also the league runners-up, the league semi-finalist Murata are also admitted into the competition.

Murata won the tournament for the 9th time, also their third cup in the last four tournaments.

== Tournament bracket ==
Semi-finals
September 23
Juvenes/Dogana	1
Murata	2
September 23
Tre Fiori	0
Domagnano	1

Final
November 24
Murata	1
Domagnano	0
