= David Tomassini =

Sammarinese footballer

Personal information
- Date of birth: 14 March 2000 (age 26)
- Place of birth: City of San Marino, San Marino
- Position: Forward

Team information
- Current team: Cosmos

Youth career
- –2017: San Marino

Senior career*
| Years | Team | Apps | (Gls) |
| 2017–2018 | San Marino | 1 | (0) |
| 2018–2019 | C.B.R. Carli Pietracuta | | |
| 2019–2020 | Cattolica | 1 | (0) |
| 2020–2021 | Murata | 19 | (0) |
| 2021–2023 | Tropical Coriano | | |
| 2023–2024 | AC Virtus | 8 | (0) |
| 2024–2026 | AC Libertas | 17 | (0) |
| 2026– | Cosmos | 3 | (0) |

International career^{‡}
| 2015–2016 | San Marino U17 | 6 | (0) |
| 2017–2018 | San Marino U19 | 6 | (0) |
| 2018–2020 | San Marino U21 | 12 | (0) |
| 2021–2022 | San Marino | 14 | (1) |
- * Club domestic league appearances and goals as of 5 June 2026 ‡ National team caps and goals as of 21 November 2022

David Tomassini (born 14 March 2000) is a Sammarinese footballer who plays as a forward for Cosmos and the San Marino national team.

== International career ==
Tomassini made his international debut for San Marino on 31 March 2021 in a 2022 FIFA World Cup qualification match against Albania. On 1 June 2021, he scored San Marino's first goal in over 1 year against Kosovo in a friendly in the 85th minute.

=== International goals ===
Scores and results list San Marino's goal tally first.

| No. | Date | Venue | Opponent | Score | Result | Competition |
|---|---|---|---|---|---|---|
| 1. | 1 June 2021 | Fadil Vokrri Stadium, Pristina, Kosovo | Kosovo | 1–4 | 1–4 | Friendly |
Last updated 1 June 2021

=== International career statistics ===
As of 21 November 2022

San Marino
| Year | Apps | Goals |
|---|---|---|
| 2021 | 8 | 1 |
| 2022 | 6 | 0 |
| Total | 14 | 1 |
