= 2008–09 Coppa Titano =

San Marino football competition

Coppa Titano 2008–09 was the forty-ninth season of San Marino's oldest football competition. It began on 2 October 2008 with the first games of the Group Stage and ended on 4 May 2009 with the Final held at Stadio Olimpico, Serravalle. Murata were the defending champions. The winners of the competition earned a place in the second qualifying round of the UEFA Europa League 2009–10.

== Competition format ==
The competition consisted of two stages, the Group Stage and the Elimination Rounds. The Group Stage consisted of three groups with five teams each. Every team played two games (once home and once away) against every other team of its group. The top two teams from each group, as well as the two best third-placed teams, qualified for the Elimination Rounds. The Elimination Rounds were a single-game elimination tournament. Games in the Elimination Rounds were decided by extra time and, if necessary, a penalty shootout.

== Group stage ==
=== Group A ===
Pos	Team	Pld	W	D	L	GF	GA	GD	Pts	LIB	LFI	MUR	TFI	PEN
1	Libertas (A)	8	4	1	3	14	11	+3	13 (Note: LIB: 7 pts, 6–4; LFI: 6 pts, 4–5; MUR: 4 pts, 4–5)		0–1	2–1	2–1	2–3
2	La Fiorita (A)	8	4	1	3	13	11	+2	13 (Note: Because Murata and La Fiorita played a deciding match in order to determine the second quarterfinal participant.)	1–3		2–1	0–2	6–2
3	Murata	8	4	1	3	13	11	+2	13	1–1	1–0		1–0	3–2
4	Tre Fiori	8	3	3	2	10	8	+2	12	2–1	1–1	3–2		1–1
5	Pennarossa	8	1	2	5	11	20	−9	5	1–3	1–2	1–3	0–0	

Source: Classification and Results (in Italian)
Legend: Blue = home team win; Yellow = draw; Red = away team win.
Rules for classification: 1) points; 2) head-to-head points; 3) head-to-head goal difference; 4) head-to-head goals scored; 5) goal difference; 6) number of goals scored.
(A) Advanced to Quarterfinals

=== Group B ===
Pos	Team	Pld	W	D	L	GF	GA	GD	Pts	CAI	COS	FAE	FOL	SGI
1	Cailungo (A)	8	4	3	1	14	8	+6	15		1–1	1–1	1–0	1–1
2	Cosmos (A)	8	4	2	2	20	10	+10	14 (Note: COS 0–2 FAE; FAE 1–3 COS)	1–3		0–2	2–1	6–1
3	Faetano (A)	8	4	2	2	10	9	+1	14	1–3	1–3		2–1	1–0
4	Folgore	8	2	2	4	11	11	0	8	3–1	1–1	1–1		3–0
5	San Giovanni	8	1	1	6	5	22	−17	4	0–3	0–6	0–1	3–1	

Source: Classification and Results (in Italian)
Legend: Blue = home team win; Yellow = draw; Red = away team win.
Rules for classification: 1) points; 2) head-to-head points; 3) head-to-head goal difference; 4) head-to-head goals scored; 5) goal difference; 6) number of goals scored.
(A) Advanced to Quarterfinals

=== Group C ===
Pos	Team	Pld	W	D	L	GF	GA	GD	Pts	J/D	VIR	DOM	TPE	FIO
1	Juvenes/Dogana (A)	8	5	2	1	17	7	+10	17		1–1	1–2	1–0	5–1
2	Virtus (A)	8	5	1	2	18	9	+9	16	0–2		3–1	3–1	5–1
3	Domagnano (A)	8	5	0	3	13	12	+1	15	1–2	1–0		1–0	4–2
4	Tre Penne	8	3	1	4	14	12	+2	10	1–1	2–4	3–1		4–0
5	Fiorentino	8	0	0	8	7	29	−22	0	1–4	0–2	1–2	1–3	

Source: Classification and Results
Legend: Blue = home team win; Yellow = draw; Red = away team win.
Rules for classification: 1) points; 2) head-to-head points; 3) head-to-head goal difference; 4) head-to-head goals scored; 5) goal difference; 6) number of goals scored.
(A) Advanced to Quarterfinals

=== Deciding match ===
Because Murata and La Fiorita had the same number of points and identical goal difference, they played a deciding match in order to determine the second quarterfinal participant from Group A. The match was played on April 22, 2009, at Stadio Olimpico, Serravalle.

Team 1	Score	Team 2
Murata	1–1 (aet, p. 2–4)	La Fiorita

== Elimination rounds ==
=== Quarterfinals ===
The matches were played on 27 April 2009.

Team 1	Score	Team 2
Cosmos	3–2 (aet)	Virtus
La Fiorita	0–2	Juvenes/Dogana
Domagnano	1–0	Cailungo
Faetano	1–0	Libertas

=== Semifinals ===
The matches were played on 30 April 2009.

Team 1	Score	Team 2
Cosmos	0–1	Juvenes/Dogana
Domagnano	2–0	Faetano

=== Final ===
The match was played on 4 May 2009 at Stadio Olimpico, Serravalle.

Team 1	Score	Team 2
Juvenes/Dogana	2–1	Domagnano
