= Mauro Marani =

Sammarinese footballer

Personal information
- Full name: Mauro Marani
- Date of birth: 9 March 1975 (age 51)
- Place of birth: San Marino
- Position: Defender

Senior career*
Years	Team	Apps	(Gls)
1995–2000	Cosmos	?	(?)
2000–2002	Juvenes/Dogana	?	(?)
2002–2003	Murata	?	(?)
2003–2009	Pennarossa	?	(?)
2009–2011	Murata	34	(0)

International career^{‡}
1998–2009	San Marino	24	(0)
- * Club domestic league appearances and goals as of 18 July 2020 ‡ National team caps and goals as of 13:30, 3 November 2010 (UTC)

Mauro Marani (born 9 March 1975) is a former Sanmarinese international footballer who last played as a defender for Murata.

== Career ==
=== Club career ===
Marani has played club football for Cosmos, Juvenes/Dogana, Murata and Pennarossa.

=== International career ===
Marani played in 13 FIFA World Cup qualifying matches.

Marani was sent off in an international match on 15 October 2008, against Northern Ireland, for striking opposition player Michael O'Connor.
