= Pietro Sopranzi =

Sammarinese footballer

Personal information
- Full name: Pietro Sopranzi
- Date of birth: 29 January 1998 (age 28)
- Place of birth: San Marino
- Position: Forward

Team information
- Current team: Domagnano
- Number: 24

Youth career
- –2016: San Marino Academy

Senior career*
Years	Team	Apps	(Gls)
2020–2021	Libertas	11	(1)
2021–2024	Virtus	32	(10)
2025–	Domagnano	29	(3)

International career^{‡}
2014	San Marino U17	3	(0)
2015	San Marino U21	2	(0)
2022	San Marino	1	(0)
- * Club domestic league appearances and goals as of 25 June 2026 ‡ National team caps and goals as of 21 November 2022

Pietro Sopranzi (born 29 January 1998) is a former Sammarinese footballer who plays as a forward for Domagnano and was capped by the San Marino national team.

== Career ==
Sopranzi made his international debut for San Marino on 17 November 2022 in a friendly match against Saint Lucia, which finished as a 1–1 away draw.

== Career statistics ==
=== International ===
As of 21 November 2022

San Marino
Year	Apps	Goals
2022	1	0
Total	1	0
