= Marco Bernardi =

Sammarinese footballer

Personal information
- Full name: Marco Bernardi
- Date of birth: 2 January 1994 (age 32)
- Place of birth: San Marino
- Height: 1.90 m (6 ft 3 in)
- Position: Forward

Team information
- Current team: Folgore
- Number: 9

Senior career*
Years	Team	Apps	(Gls)
2015–2016	Juvenes/Dogana	14	(0)
2016–2018	Fiorentino	28	(3)
2018–2021	Folgore	48	(9)
2019–2020	→ Domagnano (Loan)	7	(0)
2021–22	Murata	25	(4)
2022–	Folgore	90	(10)

International career^{‡}
2017–	San Marino	10	(0)
- * Club domestic league appearances and goals as of 5 June 2026 ‡ National team caps and goals as of 5 June 2022

Marco Bernardi (born 2 January 1994) is a Sammarinese football player who plays as a forward for Folgore.

== Career ==
Bernardi debuted with the senior national team on 29 March 2017 in a friendly against Moldova.
