= Fabio Tomassini =

Sammarinese footballer (born 1996)

Personal information
- Full name: Fabio Ramon Tomassini
- Date of birth: 5 February 1996 (age 30)
- Position: Midfielder

Team information
- Current team: Libertas
- Number: 11

Senior career*
Years	Team	Apps	(Gls)
2014–2015	A.C. Bellaria Igea Marina	27	(2)
2015–2016	A.P.D. Ribelle 1927	16	(1)
2016–2017	A.S.D. Romagna Centro	13	(0)
2017–2018	Sammaurese	4	(0)
2018–2021	Pietracuta		
2021	Pennarossa	5	(0)
2021–2024	Pietracuta		
2024–	Libertas	51	(4)

International career^{‡}
2012–2013	San Marino U-17	4	(1)
2013	San Marino U-19	3	(0)
2014	San Marino U-21	10	(0)
2015–	San Marino	33	(0)
- * Club domestic league appearances and goals as of 5 June 2026 ‡ National team caps and goals as of 8 September 2023

Fabio Ramon Tomassini (born 5 February 1996) is a Sammarinese footballer who plays as a midfielder for Libertas and for San Marino national football team.

== Personal life ==
Tomassini is of Cuban descent. He works as a salesman while also playing football. His brother David Tomassini is a fellow San Marino international footballer.
