= Coppa Titano =

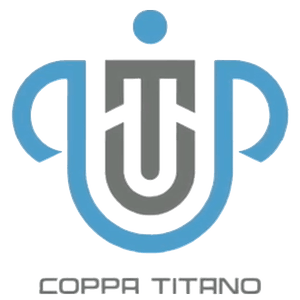
- Founded: 1937; 89 years ago
- Region: San Marino
- Teams: 15
- Qualifier for: UEFA Europa Conference League
- Current champions: La Fiorita (8th title)
- Most championships: Libertas (11 titles)
- 2026–27 Coppa Titano

The Coppa Titano is the national football cup of San Marino. It was first awarded in 1937.

== Cup Winners ==
- 1937 : Libertas

not played from 1938 to 1949

- 1950 : Libertas

not played from 1951 to 1953

- 1954 : Libertas

not played from 1955 to 1957

- 1958 : Libertas
- 1959 : Libertas
- 1960 : not played
- 1961 : Libertas

not played from 1962 to 1964

- 1965 : Juvenes
- 1966 : Tre Fiori
- 1967 : Tre Penne
- 1968 : Juvenes
- 1969 : not assigned
- 1970 : Tre Penne
- 1971 : Tre Fiori
- 1972 : Domagnano
- 1973 : not assigned
- 1974 : Tre Fiori
- 1975 : Tre Fiori
- 1976 : Juvenes
- 1977 : Dogana
- 1978 : Juvenes
- 1979 : Dogana
- 1980 : Cosmos
- 1981 : Cosmos
- 1982 : Tre Penne
- 1983 : Tre Penne
- 1984 : Juvenes
- 1985 : Tre Fiori
- 1986 : La Fiorita 6-1 Tre Fiori
- 1987 : Libertas 0-0 (5-3) Tre Penne
- 1988 : Domagnano 2-1 La Fiorita
- 1989 : Libertas 2-0 La Fiorita
- 1990 : Domagnano 2-0 Juvenes
- 1991 : Libertas 2-0 Faetano
- 1992 : Domagnano 1-1 (4-2) Tre Fiori
- 1993 : Faetano 1-0 Libertas
- 1994 : Faetano 3-1 Folgore
- 1995 : Cosmos 0-0 (3-1) Faetano
- 1996 : Domagnano 2-0 Cosmos
- 1997 : Murata 2-0 Virtus
- 1998 : Faetano 4-1 Cosmos
- 1999 : Cosmos 5-1 Domagnano
- 2000 : Tre Penne 3-1 Folgore
- 2001 : Domagnano 1-0 Tre Fiori
- 2002 : Domagnano 6-1 Cailungo
- 2003 : Domagnano 1-0 Pennarossa
- 2004 : Pennarossa 3-0 Domagnano
- 2005 : Pennarossa 4-1 Tre Penne
- 2006 : Libertas 4-1 Tre Penne
- 2007 : Murata 2-1 Libertas
- 2008 : Murata 1-0 Juvenes/Dogana
- 2009 : Juvenes/Dogana 2-1 Domagnano
- 2010 : Tre Fiori 2-1 Tre Penne
- 2011 : Juvenes/Dogana 4-1 Virtus
- 2012 : La Fiorita 3-2 Pennarossa
- 2013 : La Fiorita 1-0 San Giovanni
- 2014 : Libertas 2-0 Faetano
- 2015 : Folgore/Falciano 5-0 Murata
- 2016 : La Fiorita 2-0 Pennarossa
- 2017 : Tre Penne 2–0 La Fiorita
- 2018 : La Fiorita 3–2 Tre Penne
- 2019 : Tre Fiori 1–0 Folgore
- 2020 : not assigned
- 2021 : La Fiorita 0–0 (10–9) Tre Fiori
- 2022 : Tre Fiori 3–1 Folgore
- 2023 : Virtus 3–1 Tre Penne
- 2024 : La Fiorita 0–0 (4–2) Virtus
- 2025 : Virtus 1–0 Tre Fiori
- 2026 : La Fiorita 3–1 Tre Fiori

== Performance by club ==
Club	Winners	Years
Libertas	11	1937, 1950, 1954, 1958, 1959, 1961, 1987, 1989, 1991, 2006, 2014
Domagnano	8	1972, 1988, 1990, 1992, 1996, 2001, 2002, 2003
Tre Fiori	8	1966, 1971, 1974, 1975, 1985, 2010, 2019, 2022
La Fiorita	8	1986, 2012, 2013, 2016, 2018, 2021, 2024, 2026
Tre Penne	6	1967, 1970, 1982, 1983, 2000, 2017
Juvenes	5	1965, 1968, 1976, 1978, 1984
Cosmos	4	1980, 1981, 1995, 1999
Faetano	3	1993, 1994, 1998
Murata	3	1997, 2007, 2008
Virtus	2	2023, 2025
Dogana	2	1977, 1979
Juvenes/Dogana	2	2009, 2011
Pennarossa	2	2004, 2005
Folgore/Falciano	1	2015
