= FK Rabotnichki in European football =

Macedonian club in European football

FK Rabotnički in European football
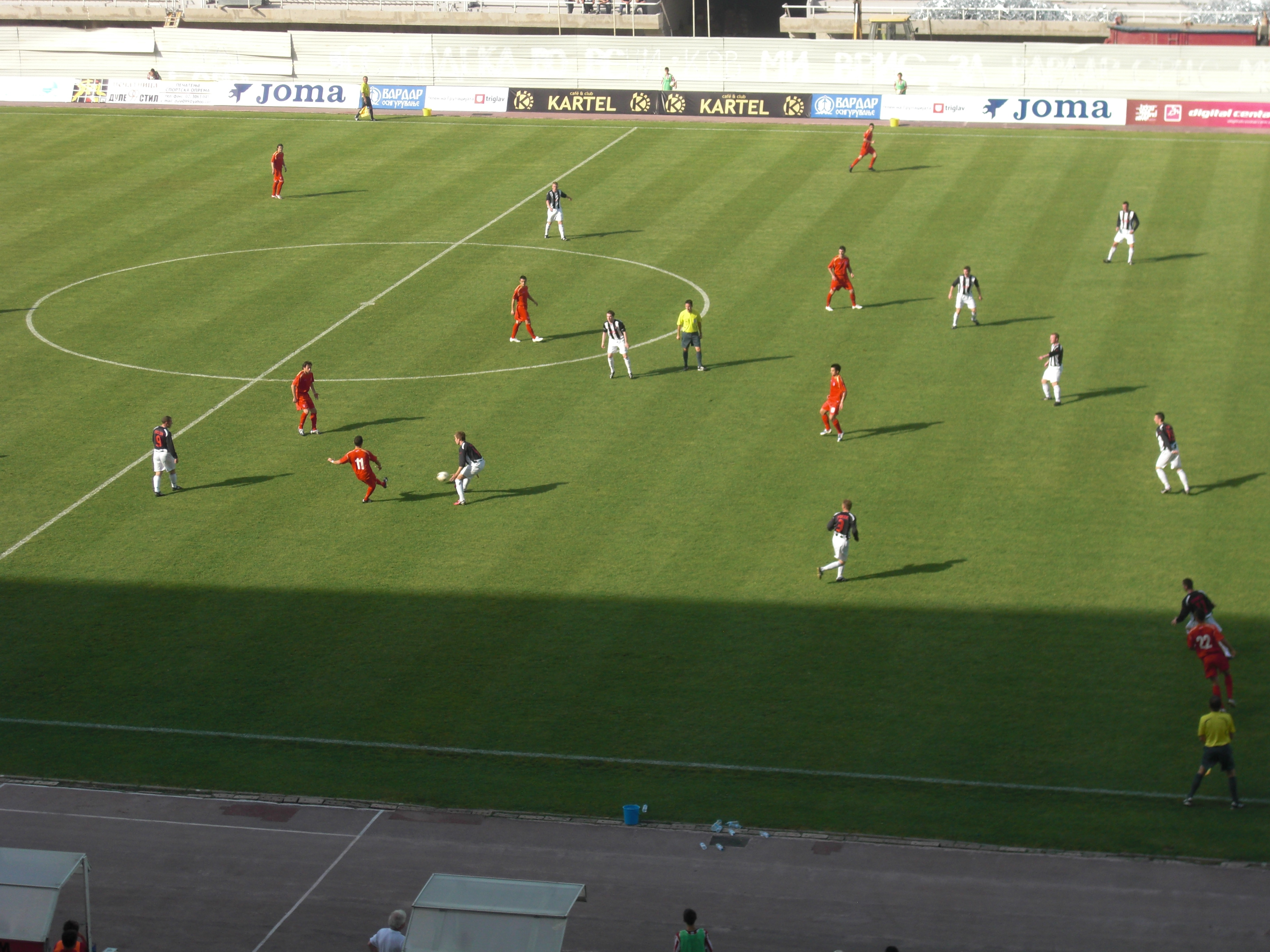
- The 2009–10 Europa League qualifying match between Rabotnički and Crusaders at Philip II Arena in Skopje
- Club: FK Rabotnički
- First entry: 2000–01 UEFA Cup
- Latest entry: 2018–19 UEFA Europa League

This is the list of all FK Rabotnički's European matches.

== Summary ==
=== By competition ===
Competition	Pld	W	D	L	GF	GA	Last season played
UEFA Champions League	14	3	6	5	15	13	2014–15
UEFA Cup; UEFA Europa League	44	18	8	18	62	58	2018–19
Total	58	21	14	23	77	71	

Source: UEFA.com, Last updated on 19 July 2018
Pld = Matches played; W = Matches won; D = Matches drawn; L = Matches lost; GF = Goals for; GA = Goals against. Defunct competitions indicated in italics.

=== By ground ===
Overall	Pld	W	D	L	GF	GA	GD
Home	29	13	9	7	52	26	+26
Away	29	8	5	16	25	45	–20
Total	58	21	14	23	77	71	+6

Last updated: 19 July 2018

== Results ==
Season	Competition	Round	Club	Home	Away	Aggregate
2000–01	UEFA Cup	QR	(Ukraine) Vorskla Poltava	0–2	0–2	0–4
2005–06	Champions League	QR1	(Latvia) Skonto	6–0	0–1	6–1
2005–06	Champions League	QR2	(Russia) Lokomotiv Moscow	1–1	0–2	1–3
2006–07	Champions League	QR1	(Luxembourg) F91 Dudelange	0–0	1–0	1–0
2006–07	Champions League	QR2	(Hungary) Debrecen	4–1	1–1	5–2
2006–07	Champions League	QR3	(France) Lille	0–1	0–3	0–5
2006–07	UEFA Cup	R1	(Switzerland) Basel	0–1	2–6	2–7
2007–08	UEFA Cup	QR1	(Slovenia) Gorica	2–1	2–1	4–2
2007–08	UEFA Cup	QR2	(Bosnia and Herzegovina) Zrinjski Mostar	0–0	2–1	2–1
2007–08	UEFA Cup	R1	(England) Bolton Wanderers	1–1	0–1	1–2
2008–09	Champions League	QR1	(Azerbaijan) Inter Baku	1–1	0–0	1–1 (a)
2009–10	Europa League	QR2	(Northern Ireland) Crusaders	4–2	1–1	5–3
2009–10	Europa League	QR3	(Denmark) Odense	3–4	0–3	3–7
2010–11	Europa League	QR1	(Andorra) Lusitanos	5–0	6–0	11–0
2010–11	Europa League	QR2	(Armenia) Mika	1–0	0–0	1–0
2010–11	Europa League	QR3	(England) Liverpool	0–2	0–2	0–4
2011–12	Europa League	QR1	(Estonia) Narva Trans	3–0	4–1	7–1
2011–12	Europa League	QR2	(San Marino) Juvenes/Dogana	3–0	1–0	4–0
2011–12	Europa League	QR3	(Cyprus) Anorthosis Famagusta	1–2	2–0	3–2
2011–12	Europa League	PO	(Italy) Lazio	1–3	0–6	1–9
2014–15	Champions League	QR2	(Finland) HJK Helsinki	0–0	1–2	1–2
2015–16	Europa League	QR1	(Estonia) Flora Tallinn	2–0	0–1	2–1
2015–16	Europa League	QR2	(Latvia) Jelgava	2–0	0–1	2–1
2015–16	Europa League	QR3	(Turkey) Trabzonspor	1–0	1–1 (a.e.t.)	2–1
2015–16	Europa League	PO	(Russia) Rubin Kazan	1–1	0–1	1–2
2016–17	Europa League	QR1	(Montenegro) Budućnost Podgorica	1–1	0–1	1–2
2017–18	Europa League	QR1	(San Marino) Tre Penne	6–0	1–0	7–0
2017–18	Europa League	QR2	(Belarus) Dinamo Minsk	1–1	0–3	1–4
2018–19	Europa League	QR1	(Hungary) Honvéd	2–1	0–4	2–5
2025–26	Conference League	QR1	(Belarus) Torpedo-BelAZ Zhodino	0–1	0–3	0–4

=== Player records ===
- Most appearances in UEFA club competitions: 22 appearances
  - Krste Velkoski
- Top scorers in UEFA club competitions: 6 goals
  - Krste Velkoski

== UEFA club coefficient ranking ==
=== Current ===
(As of 19 April 2017), Source:

Rank	Movement	Team	Points	Change
304	▲ +18	(Hungary) Ferencváros	3.900	—
305	▲ +21	(Northern Ireland) Crusaders	3.900	—
306	▼ -50	(North Macedonia) Rabotnički	3.875	▼ -1.325
307	▲ +41	(Malta) Birkirkara	3.800	—
308	▲ +22	(Azerbaijan) FC Baku	3.800	—

=== Rankings ===
==== 2008–2017 ====
Season	Ranking	Movement	Points	Change
2007–08	207	—	3.090	—
2008–09	203	▲ +4	2.033	▼ -1.057
2009–10	222	▼ -19	3.066	▲ +1.033
2010–11	223	▼ -1	4.041	▲ +0.975
2011–12	203	▲ +20	5.633	▲ +1.592
2012–13	252	▼ -49	4.550	▼ -1.083
2013–14	277	▼ -25	4.550	0.000
2014–15	280	▼ -3	4.675	▲ +0.125
2015–16	256	▲ +24	5.200	▲ +0.525
2016–17	306	▼ -50	3.875	▼ -1.325
