= Andrea Moroni =

Sammarinese footballer (born 1985)

Personal information
- Date of birth: 10 October 1985 (age 41)
- Position: Forward

Team information
- Current team: ASD Verucchio Calcio

Senior career*
Years	Team	Apps	(Gls)
2004–2016	SC Faetano	110	(49)
2016–2021	SS San Giovanni	65	(10)
2021–	ASD Verucchio Calcio		

International career^{‡}
2011	San Marino	1	(0)
- * Club domestic league appearances and goals as of 17 June 2023 ‡ National team caps and goals as of 18 July 2020

Andrea Moroni (born 10 October 1985) is a Sammarinese footballer who currently plays for ASD Verucchio Calcio.

He has been capped by the San Marino national football team, making his international debut in 2011.
