= COVID-19 pandemic in San Marino =

- Disease: COVID-19
- Pathogen: SARS-CoV-2
- Location: San Marino
- First outbreak: Wuhan, Hubei, China
- Arrival date: 27 February 2020 (6 years, 7 months and 3 weeks)
- Date: As of 25 June 2021
- Confirmed cases: 20,552 (total)
- Active cases: 201 (in quarantine or isolation)
- Hospitalized cases: Unknown (active)
- Critical cases: 4 (active)
- Recovered: 20,351 (total)
- Deaths: 118 (total)
- Fatality rate: 2.06%

Government website
- www.iss.sm

The COVID-19 pandemic in San Marino was a part of the ongoing worldwide pandemic of coronavirus disease 2019 (COVID-19) caused by severe acute respiratory syndrome coronavirus 2 (SARS-CoV-2). The virus was confirmed to have reached San Marino in February 2020.

As of 11 May 2023, with 21,083 confirmed cases out of a population of 33,600 (as of 2020), it was the country with the fourth-highest percentage of confirmed cases per capita at 71.13% – 7 confirmed case per 10 inhabitants. Also, with 90 confirmed deaths, the country has one of the highest rate of confirmed deaths per capita at 0.268% of the total population – 1 death per 373 inhabitants. The crude fatality rate is 2.63%. It was once declared "COVID-free" on 26 June 2020, although it had another case by 9 July. Despite this case recovering by the end of the month, the pandemic returned soon after, with most recorded covid-assigned fatalities occurring after July 2020.

== Background ==
On 12 January 2020, the World Health Organization (WHO) confirmed that a novel coronavirus was the cause of a respiratory illness in a cluster of people in Wuhan, Hubei, China, which was reported to the WHO on 31 December 2019.

The case fatality ratio for COVID-19 has been much lower than SARS of 2003, but the transmission has been significantly greater, with a significant total death toll.

== Timeline ==
=== February 2020 ===
On 27 February, San Marino confirmed its first case, an 88-year-old man with pre-existing medical conditions. He was hospitalised in Rimini, Italy.

=== March 2020 ===
On 1 March, seven more cases were confirmed and the Health Emergency Coordination Group confirmed that the 88-year-old man had died, becoming the first Sammarinese to die of the virus.

On 8 March, the number of confirmed cases had increased to 36.

On 10 March 63 cases were confirmed. On 11 March 66 cases were confirmed, and the death count increased to 3.

On 12 March, confirmed cases count increased to 67 and the death count to 5.

On 14 March, the government ordered a nationwide quarantine until 6 April.

=== June 2020 ===
San Marino was declared to have no active cases on 26 June. In total, 698 cases of COVID-19 had been identified, of whom 42 died and the remaining 656 recovered.

=== July 2020 ===
On 9 July, one case of COVID-19 was identified and isolated. The patient recovered and by the end of the month, the number of active cases in the country returned to zero.

=== December 2020 ===
As 28 December, the total number of infected people is 2,275. There are 57 deaths and 1,955 recovered.

=== February 2021 ===
On 2 February 2021, Fausta Morganti, who was Captain Regent between 1 April 2005 and 1 October 2005 died from COVID-19 at the age of 76.

=== May 2021 ===
Health Minister Roberto Ciavatta announced that anyone booking a hotel in San Marino for at least three nights could receive the Sputnik V COVID-19 vaccine for €50.

As of May 2021, San Marino had administered 36,000 doses and fully vaccinated approximately 22,000 people.

== Statistics ==
=== Confirmed new cases per day ===
View source data.

=== Confirmed deaths per day ===
View source data.

== See also ==
- Healthcare in San Marino
- COVID-19 pandemic by country and territory
- COVID-19 pandemic in Europe
- COVID-19 pandemic in Italy
