= SS Folgore Falciano Calcio =

Sanmarinese football club

Folgore
- Full name: Società Sportiva Folgore Falciano Calcio
- Founded: 1972; 54 years ago
- Ground: San Marino Stadium
- Capacity: 6,664
- Chairman: Mauro Duca
- Manager: Oscar Lasagni
- League: Campionato Sammarinese di Calcio
- 2025–26: Campionato Sammarinese di Calcio, 5th of 16
- Website: https://www.folgorecalcio.com/
Home colours	Away colours

SS Folgore Falciano Calcio is a Sanmarinese football club based in Falciano, Serravalle. The club was founded in 1972. Folgore currently plays in Girone A of Campionato Sammarinese di Calcio. The team's colours are red, yellow and black.

== Honours ==
- Campionato Sammarinese di Calcio: (5)

1996–97, 1997–98, 1999-00, 2014–15, 2020–21

- Coppa Titano: 1

2014–15

- San Marino Federal Trophy: 2

1997, 2000

- Super Coppa Sammarinese: 1

2015

== European record ==
Season	Competition	Round	Club	Home	Away	Agg.
2000-01	2000-01 UEFA Cup	QR	(Switzerland) Basel	1–5	0–7	1–12
2014-15	2014-15 UEFA Europa League	1QR	(Montenegro) Budućnost Podgorica	1–2	0–3	1–5
2015-16	2015-16 UEFA Champions League	1QR	(Armenia) Pyunik	1–2	1–2	2–4
2016-17	2016-17 UEFA Europa League	1QR	(Cyprus) AEK Larnaca	1–3	0–3	1–6
2017-18	2017–18 UEFA Europa League	1QR	(Malta) Valletta	0–1	0–2	0–3
2018-19	2018–19 UEFA Europa League	PR	(Andorra) Engordany	1–1	1–2	2–3
2021-22	2021–22 UEFA Champions League	PR	(Kosovo) Prishtina	0–2		
2021-22	2021–22 UEFA Europa Conference League	2QR	(Malta) Hibernians	1–3	2–4	3–7

Notes

- PR: Preliminary round
- QR: Qualifying round
- 1Q: First qualifying round
- 2Q: Second qualifying round

== Current squad ==
As of 4 February 2026

Note: Flags indicate national team as defined under FIFA eligibility rules; some limited exceptions apply. Players may hold more than one non-FIFA nationality.

No.	Pos.	Nation	Player
1	GK	SMR	Mirco De Angelis
2	DF	SMR	Alex Cavalli
3	MF	ITA	Azael Garcia Rufer
4	MF	SEN	Assane Fall
5	MF	BRA	Adam Adami Martins
6	DF	ITA	Manuel Miori
7	FW	ITA	Raul Ura
9	FW	SMR	Marco Bernardi
10	MF	ITA	Fabio Cateni
11	MF	ITA	Augusto Garcia Rufer
14	MF	ITA	Giovanni De Nicolò
17	FW	SMR	Jacopo Raschi

No.	Pos.	Nation	Player
18	DF	ITA	Alessandro Castorina
19	FW	SMR	Samuel Pancotti
20	DF	ITA	Gianluca Gaido
21	FW	ITA	Fabrizio Aversario
22	MF	ITA	Federico Malaponti
24	DF	ITA	Francesco Sartori
26	DF	SEN	Yero Touré
27	DF	ITA	Leonard Facchetti
28	DF	SMR	Cristian Brolli
30	DF	ITA	Ramzi Ghersallah
54	GK	ITA	Tommaso Panfili
80	GK	ITA	Angelo Russo
