= S.S. Cosmos =

Cosmos
- Full name: Società Sportiva Cosmos
- Founded: 1979; 47 years ago
- Ground: Stadio Olimpico di San Marino
- Capacity: 6,664
- Chairman: Luca Della Balda
- Manager: Andy Selva
- League: Campionato Sammarinese di Calcio
- 2025–26: Campionato Sammarinese di Calcio, 8th of 16
Home colours	Away colours

Società Sportiva Cosmos is a Sammarinese football club, based in Serravalle and founded in 1979. Cosmos currently plays in Girone A of Campionato Sammarinese di Calcio. The team's colors are green and yellow. The club is named after the New York Cosmos team.

== Achievements ==
- Campionato Sammarinese di Calcio:
  - Winners: 2000–01,
  - Runner-up: 1989–90,
- Coppa Titano:
  - Winners: 1980, 1981, 1995, 1999,
- San Marino Federal Trophy:
  - Winners: 1995, 1998, 1999

== Current squad ==
As of 6 April, 2026 Note: Flags indicate national team as defined under FIFA eligibility rules; some limited exceptions apply. Players may hold more than one non-FIFA nationality.

No.	Pos.	Nation	Player
2	DF	ITA	Daniele Grieco
3	DF	ITA	Francesco Rossi
4	MF	ITA	Francesco Tamburrano
7	MF	ARG	Matias Mazzoni
8	MF	SMR	Marcello Mularoni
10	FW	SMR	Luca Ceccaroli
11	MF	ITA	Matteo Mhilli
13	MF	ITA	Nicholas Santoni
16	FW	SMR	Danilo Rinaldi
17	FW	ITA	Alberto Rivi
18	MF	ITA	Lorenzo Hamati
19	FW	ITA	Filippo Albini
20	MF	ARG	Giuliano Gaita

No.	Pos.	Nation	Player
22	DF	ARG	Leandro Carubini
23	MF	ITA	Katriel Islamaj
25	GK	ITA	Luca Donini
27	GK	ITA	Alessandro Semprini
32	FW	ITA	Alex Ambrosini
33	DF	ITA	Davide Maioli
37	FW	MKD	Bojan Gjurchinoski
72	GK	ITA	Marco Caputo
91	DF	ITA	Gabriele Bufi
95	MF	ITA	Pavel Monceri
97	FW	ALB	Andrea Gjoni
99	MF	ITA	Marco Andretta

=== Out on loan ===
Note: Flags indicate national team as defined under FIFA eligibility rules; some limited exceptions apply. Players may hold more than one non-FIFA nationality.

No.	Pos.	Nation	Player
—	DF	SMR	Giacomo Valentini (at Juvenes/Dogana until 30 June 2025)

== European record ==
Season	Competition	Round	Club	Home	Away	Aggregate
2001–02	UEFA Cup	QR	(Austria) Rapid Wien	0–1	0–2	0–3
2023–24	Europa Conference League	1QR	(Montenegro) Sutjeska Nikšić	1–1	0–1	1–2

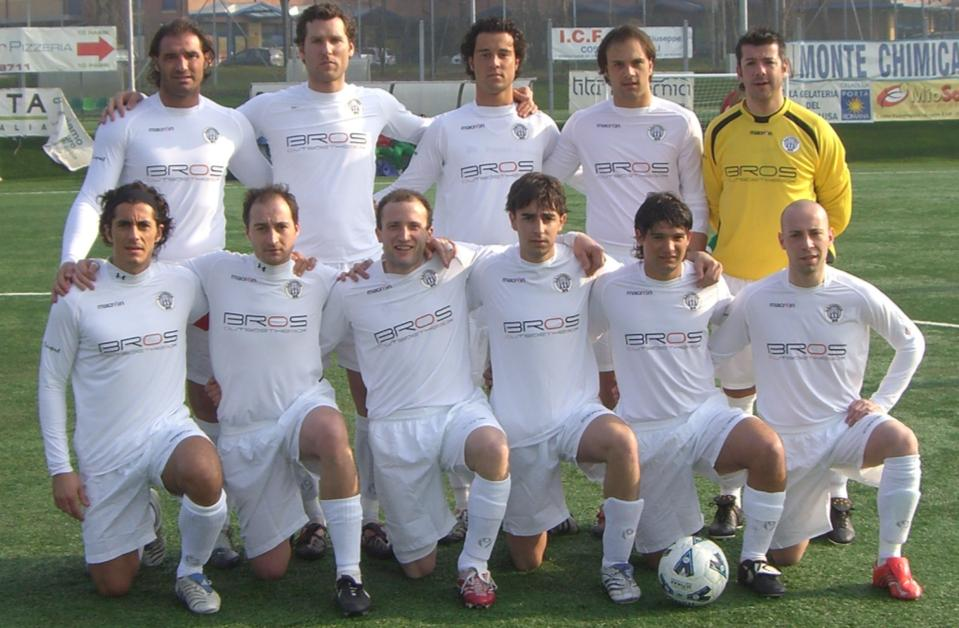
La Formazione dei Cosmos 07/08.

== Staff ==
- President : Luca Della Balda
- Segretary : Stefano Bevitori
- Club Director : Maximiliano Gobbi
- Treasurer : Federico Pedini Amati
- Cassiere : Federico Marzi
- Head Coach : Roberto Sarti
- Coach 2^ : Ivan Toccaceli
- Team Manager : Francesco Donnini
- Masseur : Urbinati Sergio (Barone)
- Contributor : Christian Paolini
