= AC Virtus =

Sanmarinese football club

Virtus
- Full name: Associazione Calcio Virtus
- Founded: 1964; 62 years ago
- Ground: Stadio di Acquaviva, Acquaviva, San Marino
- Capacity: 2,000
- Chairman: Pier Domenico Giulianelli
- Manager: Luigi Bizzotto
- League: Campionato Sammarinese di Calcio
- 2025–26: Campionato Sammarinese di Calcio, 2nd of 16
- Website: https://www.acvirtus.com/
Home colours	Away colours	Third colours

Associazione Calcio Virtus is a Sammarinese football section of the multi-sports club Società Sportiva Virtus, based in Acquaviva. The club was founded in 1964. Virtus currently plays in Campionato Sammarinese di Calcio. The team's colors are green and black. In 2025, Virtus became the first club from San Marino to reach the play-off round of a European club competition, following a 3–0 victory over Moldovan side Milsami.

== Honours ==
- Campionato Sammarinese di Calcio
  - Winners (2): 2023–24, 2024–25
  - Runner-up (2): 1987–88, , 2025–26
- Coppa Titano
  - Winners (2): 2022–23, 2024–25
- Super Coppa Sammarinese
  - Winners (3): 2023, 2024, 2025
- San Marino Federal Trophy
  - Winners (1): 1988

== European record ==
=== Matches ===
Season	Competition	Round	Club	Home	Away	Aggregate
2024–25	UEFA Champions League	1Q	(Romania) FCSB	1–7	0–4	1–11
2024–25	UEFA Conference League	2Q	(Estonia) Flora	0–0	2–5 (a.e.t.)	2–5
2025–26	UEFA Champions League	1Q	(Bosnia and Herzegovina) Zrinjski Mostar	0–2	1–2	1–4
2025–26	UEFA Conference League	2Q	Bye			
2025–26	UEFA Conference League	3Q	(Moldova) Milsami Orhei	3–0	2–3	5–3
2025–26	UEFA Conference League	PO	(Iceland) Breiðablik	1–3	1–2	2–5
2026–27	UEFA Conference League	1Q	(Georgia (country)) Dila Gori	1–0	1–3	2–3

== Current squad ==
As of 14 July 2026

Note: Flags indicate national team as defined under FIFA eligibility rules; some limited exceptions apply. Players may hold more than one non-FIFA nationality.

No.	Pos.	Nation	Player
1	GK	SMR	Mirco De Angelis
3	DF	ITA	Daniel Piscaglia
4	DF	ESP	Ayoub Yahya
6	DF	ITA	Roberto Sabato
7	FW	SMR	Simone Santi
10	MF	ITA	Ivan Buonocunto
11	MF	ITA	Tommaso Lombardi
15	DF	ITA	Nicola Gori
16	MF	ITA	Jacopo Muggeo
17	MF	SMR	Alessandro Golinucci
20	FW	SMR	Marco Gasperoni
21	MF	ITA	Armando Amati

No.	Pos.	Nation	Player
23	MF	ITA	Emilio Di Pollina
25	FW	ITA	Simone Benincasa
26	DF	ITA	Aron Giacomoni
30	DF	ITA	Mirco De Santis
31	GK	ITA	Samuele Guddo
33	FW	ITA	Imre Badalassi
34	DF	ITA	Umberto De Lucia
39	GK	ITA	Alex Passaniti
45	MF	SMR	Elia Ciacci
77	MF	ITA	Vittorio Satalino
90	FW	ITA	Stefano Scappini
93	FW	ITA	Giammario Piscitella
