= AC Libertas =

Sammarinese football club

Libertas
- Full name: Associazione Calcio Libertas
- Founded: 1928; 98 years ago
- Ground: Campo Sportivo di Borgo Maggiore; Campo Sportivo di Domagnano
- Capacity: 500
- Chairman: Massimo Ghiotti
- Manager: Floriano Sperindio
- League: Campionato Sammarinese di Calcio
- 2024–25: Campionato Sammarinese di Calcio, 13th of 16
Home colours	Away colours

Associazione Calcio Libertas is a Sanmarinese football club, based in Borgo Maggiore. The club was founded in 1928. Libertas currently plays in Girone B of Campionato Sammarinese di Calcio. The team's colors are red and white. Libertas is the oldest football club in San Marino. The team qualified for the UEFA Cup Preliminary phase in 2007. However, they lost by a 1–4 aggregate to Drogheda United from Ireland in the next round.

== Honours ==
- Campionato Sammarinese di Calcio: 1

1995–96

- Coppa Titano: 11

1937, 1950, 1954, 1958, 1959, 1961, 1987, 1989, 1991, 2006, 2014

- San Marino Federal Trophy: 3

1989, 1992, 1996

- Super Coppa Sammarinese: 1

2014

== Current squad ==
As of 25 January 2026. Note: Flags indicate national team as defined under FIFA eligibility rules; some limited exceptions apply. Players may hold more than one non-FIFA nationality.

No.	Pos.	Nation	Player
4	DF	ALB	Enea Senja
5	MF	ITA	Gianluca Morelli
6	DF	ITA	Francesco Severi
7	MF	SMR	Fabio Ramon Tomassini
9	FW	ITA	Roberto Guidotti
11	DF	ITA	Edoardo Gulfo
14	MF	ITA	Federico Berardi
17	MF	SMR	Tommaso Nicolini
19	FW	ITA	Hamza Hamidou Boureima
20	MF	ITA	Andrea Quarta
21	DF	ITA	Patrik Fabbri

No.	Pos.	Nation	Player
22	DF	ITA	Giammaria Rigoni
23	DF	ITA	Davide Nigro
30	DF	ITA	Enrico Mantovani
33	MF	ITA	Soulemane Diomande
45	DF	ITA	Daniel Cappello
55	DF	ITA	Giacomo Moncastelli
69	GK	ITA	Manuel Nigro
77	MF	SMR	Riccardo Michelotti
81	FW	SMR	Giacomo Rossi
87	MF	ITA	Roberto Baiardi
91	GK	SMR	Mattia Manzaroli
99	FW	ITA	Enrico Cozzino

== European record ==
Season	Competition	Round	Club	Home	Away	Aggregate
2007–08	UEFA Cup	First qualifying round	(Republic of Ireland) Drogheda United	1–1	0–3	1–4
2012–13	UEFA Europa League	First qualifying round	(North Macedonia) Renova	0–4	0–4	0–8
2013–14	UEFA Europa League	First qualifying round	(Bosnia and Herzegovina) FK Sarajevo	1–2	0–1	1–3
2014–15	UEFA Europa League	First qualifying round	(Bulgaria) Botev Plovdiv	0–2	0–4	0–6
