= AC Juvenes/Dogana =

Sammarinese football club

Juvenes/Dogana
- Full name: Associazione Calcio Juvenes/Dogana
- Nickname: Doganieri
- Founded: 2000
- Ground: Stadio Olimpico, Serravalle, San Marino
- Capacity: 6,664
- Chairman: Massimo Zavatta
- Manager: Achille Fabbri
- League: Campionato Sammarinese di Calcio
- 2025–26: Campionato Sammarinese di Calcio, 9th of 16
Home colours	Away colours

Former club crest

A.C. Juvenes/Dogana is a Sammarinese football club based in Dogana, in the civil parish of Serravalle. The club was founded in 2000 after the merger of S.S. Juvenes (named after a historical side in San Marino) and G.S. Dogana. Until season 2006/07 Juvenes/Dogana was the only team to play in both Sammarinese and Italian leagues, taking part in the Girone A of Campionato Sammarinese and in the Italian amateur levels, but it has since retired from the Italian leagues. The team's colors are light blue, red and white.

== Honours ==
- Coppa Titano: 9

S.S. Juvenes: 1965, 1968, 1976, 1978, 1984
G.S. Dogana: 1977, 1979
A.C. Juvenes/Dogana: 2008–2009, 2010–2011

== European record ==
Competition	Round	Club	Home	Away	Agg.
2008–09 UEFA Cup	1QR	(Israel) Hapoel Tel Aviv	0–2	0–3	0–5
2009–10 UEFA Europa League	2QR	(Poland) Polonia Warsaw	0–1	0–4	0–5
2011–12 UEFA Europa League	2QR	(North Macedonia) Rabotnichki	0–1	0–3	0–4
2015–16 UEFA Europa League	1QR	(Denmark) Brøndby	0–2	0–9	0–11

Notes

- 1QR: First qualifying round
- 2QR: Second qualifying round

== Current squad ==
As of 6 April, 2026

Note: Flags indicate national team as defined under FIFA eligibility rules; some limited exceptions apply. Players may hold more than one non-FIFA nationality.

No.	Pos.	Nation	Player
1	GK	ITA	Matteo Ronci
3	DF	ITA	Francesco Mazzavillani
4	DF	ITA	Andrea Ghiggini
6	DF	SMR	Stefano Sartini
7	FW	ITA	Nicola Sartini
8	MF	ITA	Matteo Gaiani
9	FW	ITA	Nicolò Amadori
10	MF	ITA	Riccardo Colonna
11	DF	ITA	Filippo Pedini
12	GK	SMR	Matteo Battistini
14	FW	ITA	Gianluca Benedetti
17	DF	UKR	Yuriy Bakalyar

No.	Pos.	Nation	Player
20	DF	SMR	Nicola Della Valle
21	GK	SMR	Davide Colonna
22	MF	SMR	Filippo Pasolini
23	MF	ITA	Fabio Giovagnoli
24	MF	ITA	Andrea Comuniello
26	DF	ITA	Luca Giannini
29	MF	SMR	Luca Cecchetti
30	FW	ITA	Davide Merli
44	FW	ITA	Francesco Gabellini
45	MF	ITA	Gianmaria Borghini
77	MF	ITA	Mattia Aprea
88	MF	ITA	Kevin Lisi
