= SS Murata =

Sanmarinese football club

- Full name: Società Sportiva Murata
- Founded: 1966; 60 years ago
- Ground: Stadio Fonte dell'Ovo
- Capacity: 600
- Chairman: Jader Vagnini
- Manager: Alessandro Mastronicola
- League: Campionato Sammarinese di Calcio
- 2025–26: Campionato Sammarinese di Calcio, 16th of 16
| Home colours | Away colours |

S.S. Murata is a Sanmarinese football club, based in Murata, a civil parish of the city of San Marino. The club was founded in 1966. Murata currently plays in Campionato Sammarinese di Calcio. The team's colours are black and white.

== Overview ==
They won their first Sammarinese national title in 2006, and repeated as champions the next two years. As UEFA decided to include Sammarinese champions in the first preliminary round of the UEFA Champions League starting from the 2007–08 season, Murata were the first Sanmarinese team to take part in the main European competition (see below for details). In order to reinforce the team, in July 2007 the club signed 41-year-old former Brazilian star and 1994 FIFA World Cup champion Aldair, gaining some headlines in the Italian sports news because of the move. Another former Serie A star, 43-year-old striker Massimo Agostini, played for Murata from 2005 to 2008. In July 2008, Murata announced that they were hoping to sign former Brazil international Romário so he could play in the club's upcoming UEFA Champions League fixtures. They also approached the former Formula One champion Michael Schumacher, but both declined Murata's offer. On 17 July 2007 Murata became the first Sanmarinese team to play in a UEFA Champions League fixture, contesting a First Qualifying Round tie against Tampere United from Finland. The home game of the two-legged tie was played at San Marino Calcio's Olimpico Stadium and resulted in a 2–1 win for Tampere. Murata lost the away leg 2–0 and were eliminated.

== Honours ==
- Campionato Sammarinese di Calcio: 3

2005–06, 2006–07, 2007–08

- Coppa Titano: 3

1997, 2007, 2008

- San Marino Federal Trophy: 3

2006, 2008, 2009.

== European record ==
| Season | Competition | Round | Club | Home | Away | Agg. |
|---|---|---|---|---|---|---|
| 2006–07 | UEFA Cup | First qualifying round | (Cyprus) APOEL | 0–4 | 1–3 | 1–7 |
| 2007–08 | UEFA Champions League | First qualifying round | (Finland) Tampere United | 1–2 | 0–2 | 1–4 |
| 2008–09 | UEFA Champions League | First qualifying round | (Sweden) IFK Göteborg | 0–5 | 0–4 | 0–9 |

== Current squad ==
As of 20 January 2026

Note: Flags indicate national team as defined under FIFA eligibility rules; some limited exceptions apply. Players may hold more than one non-FIFA nationality.

| No. | Pos. | Nation | Player |
|---|---|---|---|
| 1 | GK | ITA | Raffaele Bracconi |
| 2 | DF | ITA | Christian Pangrazzi |
| 4 | MF | SMR | Alberto Baldazzi |
| 6 | DF | ITA | Stefano Bernardi |
| 7 | FW | ITA | Leonardo Uva |
| 8 | MF | ALB | Anxhelo Isaraj |
| 10 | MF | ALB | Igli Gjyla |
| 11 | MF | MAR | Tarik Yahya |
| 12 | GK | ITA | Francesco Sias |
| 13 | DF | SMR | Alex De Biagi |
| 16 | DF | ITA | Kristian Ginobi |

| No. | Pos. | Nation | Player |
|---|---|---|---|
| 17 | FW | ITA | Jules Labas |
| 21 | DF | ITA | Luca Tomassoni |
| 26 | DF | ITA | Giovanni Della Mura |
| 28 | MF | ITA | Sergio Ferraro |
| 30 | MF | UKR | Ivan Piantkivskyy |
| 33 | DF | BRA | Jonathan Maciel |
| 44 | DF | ITA | Ruben Paolo Bello |
| 47 | DF | ITA | Federico Cirillo |
| 70 | MF | ALB | Jurgen Tahiri |
| 76 | MF | ITA | Cristiano Cordoma |

== Managers ==
- (San Marino) Federico Rossini (2004–2007)
- (San Marino) Gianluigi Pasquali (2007–2008)
- (Italy) Massimo Agostini (2008–10)
- (Italy) Alberto Manca (2010–11)
- (San Marino) Federico Rossini (2011–2012)
- (Italy) Ivo Crescentini (2012–13)
- (San Marino) Luca Albani (2013)
- (Italy) Manuel Amati (2013)
- (Italy) Paolo Tarini (2014–15)
- (San Marino) Fabio Baschetti (2015)
- (Italy) Matteo Cecchetti (2015–16)
- (San Marino) Fabrizio Constantini (2016–17)
- (Italy) Loris Martinini (2017)
- (San Marino) Gori Massimo (2017–19)
- (Italy) Achille Fabbri (2019–22)
- (San Marino) Roberto Sarti (2022)
- (Italy) Giuseppe Angelini (2023–24)
- (Italy) Sergio Grassi (2024–25)
- (Italy) Michele Camillini (2025–26)
- (Italy) Antonello Mancini (2026)
- (Italy) Alessandro Mastronicola (2026–present)
