= 2021–22 Coppa Titano =

Tournament details
- Country: San Marino
- Teams: 15

Final positions
- Champions: Tre Fiori
- Runners-up: Folgore

Tournament statistics
- Matches played: 27
- Goals scored: 70 (2.59 per match)

The 2021–22 Coppa Titano was the sixty-fourth edition of the football competition in San Marino. The winners of the cup, Tre Fiori qualified for a place in the 2022–23 UEFA Europa Conference League.

La Fiorita were the defending champions after winning the previous season's cup by defeating Tre Fiori on penalties. Defending champions La Fiorita were knocked out in the semi-finals. In the final, Tre Fiori defeated Folgore 3–1.

== First round ==
The first legs of the first round were played on 28–29 September 2021 and the second legs were played on 26–27 October 2021. The draw for the first round was held on 30 August 2021. La Fiorita received a bye in the first round.

| Team 1 | Agg. | Team 2 | 1st leg | 2nd leg |
|---|---|---|---|---|
| Faetano | 2–0 | Cailungo | 0–0 | 2–0 |
| Juvenes/Dogana | 1–4 | Pennarossa | 0–2 | 1–2 |
| Fiorentino | 1–3 | Tre Fiori | 1–1 | 0–2 |
| Folgore | 6–2 | Libertas | 1–1 | 5–1 |
| Virtus | 1–2 | Murata | 1–2 | 0–0 |
| Domagnano | 3–1 | San Giovanni | 2–1 | 1–0 |
| Cosmos | 4–7 | Tre Penne | 2–3 | 2–4 |

== Quarter–finals ==
The first legs of the quarter–finals were played on 24 November 2021 and the second legs were played on 8 December 2021.

| Team 1 | Agg. | Team 2 | 1st leg | 2nd leg |
|---|---|---|---|---|
| La Fiorita | 4–0 | Faetano | 3–0 | 1–0 |
| Pennarossa | 1–4 | Tre Fiori | 0–1 | 1–3 |
| Folgore | 2–1 | Murata | 0–0 | 2–1 |
| Domagnano | 3–2 | Tre Penne | 2–0 | 1–2 |

== Semi–finals ==
The two legs of the semi–finals were played on 24 and 27 April 2022.

| Team 1 | Agg. | Team 2 | 1st leg | 2nd leg |
|---|---|---|---|---|
| La Fiorita | 3–5 | Tre Fiori | 0–3 | 3–2 |
| Folgore | 3–1 | Domagnano | 2–0 | 1–1 |

== Final ==
The final was played on 30 April 2022.

30 April 2022
20:45

| Tre Fiori | 3–1 | Folgore |
|---|---|---|
| D'Addario 5'; Dolcini 14'; De Falco 37' (pen.) | Report | Fedeli 72' |

San Marino Stadium, Serravalle
Attendance: 312
Referee: Marco Avoni

| 1 | (San Marino) Aldo Junior Simoncini (c) |
| 2 | (San Marino) Alessandro D'Addario |
| 14 | (Italy) Eros Grani | | (substituted off) 46' |
| 11 | (Italy) Andrea De Falco |
| 8 | (San Marino) Luca Censoni |
| 33 | (Italy) Umberto De Lucia | (yellow card) 31' |
| 19 | (Italy) Giacomo Pracucci | | (substituted off) 78' |
| 15 | (San Marino) Federico Dolcini | | (substituted off) 60' |
| 5 | (Brazil) Adam Adami Martins |
| 10 | (Croatia) Bojan Gjurchinoski |
| 9 | (Italy) Antonio Lentini | | (substituted off) 89' |
Substitutions:
| 7 | (Italy) Claudio Cuzzilla | | (substituted on) 46' |
| 4 | (San Marino) Andrea Tamagnini | | (substituted on) 60' |
| 22 | (San Marino) Nicola Della Valle | | (substituted on) 78' |
| 23 | (Italy) Mattia Ramundo | | (substituted on) 89' |
Manager:
(San Marino) Floriano Sperindio

| 30 | (Senegal) Moussa Gueye | (yellow card) 37' |
| 37 | (Italy) Giacomo Massari |
| 77 | (Italy) Fabio Sottile | | (substituted off) 90+1' |
| 6 | (San Marino) Giovanni Bonini |
| 8 | (San Marino) Enrico Golinucci |
| 14 | (San Marino) Adolfo Hirsch |
| 20 | (Italy) Mirco Spighi | | (substituted off) 66' |
| 4 | (Italy) Andrea Nucci |
| 9 | (Italy) Emilio Docente |
| 11 | (Italy) Lorenzo Dormi |
| 10 | (Italy) Eric Fedeli |
Substitutions:
| 3 | (Italy) Daniel Piscaglia | | (substituted on) 66' |
| 7 | (San Marino) Giacomo Francioni | (yellow card) 90+1' | (substituted on) 90+1' |
Manager:
(Italy) Omar Lepri

Assistant referees:
Gianmarco Ercolani
Ernesto Cristiano
Fourth official:
Giacomo Cenci

Match rules

- 90 minutes
- 30 minutes of extra time if necessary
- Penalty shoot-out if scores still level
- Maximum of seven named substitutes
- Maximum of five substitutions, with a sixth allowed in extra time

== See also ==
- 2021–22 Campionato Sammarinese di Calcio
