= Adam Adami (footballer) =

Brazilian footballer (born 1992)

Personal information
- Full name: Adam Adami Martins
- Date of birth: 24 June 1992 (age 34)
- Place of birth: Rio de Janeiro, Brazil
- Height: 1.76 m (5 ft 9 in)
- Position: Midfielder

Team information
- Current team: Folgore
- Number: 5

Youth career
- Flamengo
- America
- Audax
- Volta Redonda
- BX Brussels

Senior career*
Years	Team	Apps	(Gls)
2019–2021	Pennarossa	36	(5)
2021–2023	Tre Fiori	52	(4)
2023–2024	Cosmos	0	(0)
2023–2024	→ Carli Pietracuta (loan)	?	(?)
2025–	Folgore	36	(3)
- * Club domestic league appearances and goals as of 25 June 2026

Adam Adami Martins (born 24 June 1992), also known as Adam Adami, is a Brazilian professional footballer who plays as a midfielder for Campionato Sammarinese di Calcio club Folgore.

== Club career ==
Adami joined the Flamengo futsal youth system at age seven and later joined America, Audax and Volta Redonda. He then relocated to Belgium to play with BX Brussels, and then went to San Marino to make his competitive debut with Pennarossa. In 2021, Adami left Pennarossa to play for Tre Fiori. In 2023, Adami joined Cosmos and played two matches in the UEFA Europa Conference League qualification before being loaned to Italian amateur-league side Carli Pietracuta for a season.

== Personal life ==
Adami is of Italian descent, with his maternal grandparents hailing from Mantua. He received his Italian passport in 2018.

== Career statistics ==
=== Club ===
As of match played 20 July 2023

Appearances and goals by club, season and competition
Club	Season	League			National Cup (Note: Includes Coppa Titano)		Europe		Other		Total	
Club	Season	Division	Apps	Goals	Apps	Goals	Apps	Goals	Apps	Goals	Apps	Goals
Pennarossa	2018–19	Campionato Sammarinese di Calcio	9	2	0	0	—		—		9	2
Pennarossa	2019–20	Campionato Sammarinese di Calcio	12	1	2	0	—		—		14	1
Pennarossa	2020–21	Campionato Sammarinese di Calcio	15	2	2	1	—		—		17	3
Pennarossa	Total		36	5	4	1	—		—		40	6
Tre Fiori	2021–22	Campionato Sammarinese di Calcio	29	3	7	1	—		—		36	4
Tre Fiori	2022–23	Campionato Sammarinese di Calcio	23	1	2	0	4 (Note: Appearances in UEFA Europa Conference League)	0	1 (Note: Appearances in Super Coppa Sammarinese)	0	30	1
Tre Fiori	Total		52	4	9	1	4	0	1	0	66	5
Cosmos	2023–24	Campionato Sammarinese di Calcio	0	0	0	0	2	0	—		2	0
Carli Pietracuta (loan)	2023–24	?	?	?	?	?	—		?	?	?	?
Career total			88	9	13	2	6	0	1	0	108	11

== Honours ==
- Coppa Titano: 2021–22
- Super Coppa Sammarinese: 2022
