= Trofeo Federale =

- Founded: 1986
- Abolished: 2011
- Region: San Marino
- Teams: 4
- Most championships: Tre Fiori (4 titles)
- Website: fsgc.sm

The San Marino Federal Trophy (Italian: Trofeo Federale) was a Supercup of association football in San Marino. The tournament began in 1986. The tournament had four teams: the finalists of the Premier League play-offs and Cup.

The final competition was held in 2011. It was replaced with the Super Coppa Sammarinese.

== Winners ==
=== By year ===
- 1986 - La Fiorita
- 1987 - La Fiorita
- 1988 - Virtus
- 1989 - Libertas
- 1990 - Domagnano
- 1991 - Tre Fiori
- 1992 - Libertas
- 1993 - Tre Fiori
- 1994 - Faetano
- 1995 - Cosmos
- 1996 - Libertas
- 1997 - Folgore
- 1998 - Cosmos
- 1999 - Cosmos
- 2000 - Folgore
- 2001 - Domagnano
- 2002 - Cailungo
- 2003 - Pennarossa
- 2004 - Domagnano
- 2005 - Tre Penne
- 2006 - Murata
- 2007 - La Fiorita
- 2008 - Murata
- 2009 - Murata
- 2010 - Tre Fiori
- 2011 - Tre Fiori

=== Performance by club ===
Club	Winners	Winning seasons
Tre Fiori	4	1991, 1993, 2010, 2011
La Fiorita	3	1986, 1987, 2007
Libertas	3	1989, 1992, 1996
Domagnano	3	1990, 2001, 2004
Cosmos	3	1995, 1998, 1999
Murata	3	2006, 2008, 2009
Folgore	2	1997, 2000
Virtus	1	1988
Faetano	1	1994
Cailungo	1	2002
Pennarossa	1	2003
Tre Penne	1	2005
