= 2023–24 Coppa Titano =

Tournament details
- Country: San Marino
- Teams: 15

Final positions
- Champions: La Fiorita
- Runners-up: Virtus

The 2023–24 Coppa Titano was the sixty-sixth edition of the football competition in San Marino. 15 of the 16 2023–24 Campionato Sammarinese di Calcio clubs participated. The winners qualified for the first qualifying round of the 2024–25 UEFA Conference League.

La Fiorita won the cup on 25 May 2024 (their seventh Coppa Titano win), defeating Virtus 4–2 on penalties after a 0–0 draw.

== First round ==
14 clubs entered the first round; defending champions Virtus received a bye. The first legs were held on 27 and 28 September 2023, followed by the second legs on 25 and 26 October 2023.

Team 1	Agg.	Team 2	1st leg	2nd leg
Cosmos	2–3	Tre Penne	1–1	1–2 (a.e.t.)
Faetano	2–2 (2–4 p)	Tre Fiori	2–2	0–0 (a.e.t.)
Fiorentino	6–2	San Giovanni	4–1	2–1
Juvenes/Dogana	1–6	Libertas	1–1	0–5
La Fiorita	2–0	Cailungo	1–0	1–0
Folgore	5–2	Pennarossa	1–0	4–2
Murata	0–2	Domagnano	0–0	0–2

== Quarter-finals ==
The seven first round winners and Virtus entered the quarter-finals. The first legs were held on 8 November 2023, followed by the second legs on 6 December 2023.

Team 1	Agg.	Team 2	1st leg	2nd leg
Folgore	0–1	Tre Fiori	0–1	0–0
La Fiorita	6–2	Fiorentino	2–1	4–1
Libertas	2–8	Tre Penne	1–3	1–5
Virtus	4–1	Domagnano	2–1	2–0

== Semi-finals ==
The four quarter-final winners entered the semi-finals. The first legs were held on 6 March 2024, followed by the second legs on 3 April 2024.

Team 1	Agg.	Team 2	1st leg	2nd leg
La Fiorita	7–2	Tre Penne	4–1	3–1
Virtus	5–1	Tre Fiori	3–1	2–0

== Final ==
The final was held between the two semi-final winners.

25 May 2024
20:45

Virtus	0–0 (a.e.t.)	La Fiorita
Penalties
	2–4

San Marino Stadium, Serravalle
Referee: William Villa

== See also ==
- 2023–24 Campionato Sammarinese di Calcio
