= 1987–88 Campionato Sammarinese di Calcio =

Campionato Sammarinese di Calcio
- Season: 1987–88
- Champions: S.P. Tre Fiori

The 1987–88 Campionato Sammarinese di Calcio season was the 3rd season since its establishment. It was contested by 10 teams, and S.P. Tre Fiori won the championship.

== Regular season ==
Pos	Team	Pld	W	D	L	GF	GA	GD	Pts	Qualification or relegation
1	S.P. Tre Fiori	18	11	3	4	27	14	+13	25	Qualification for the championship play–offs
2	S.S. Folgore/Falciano	18	10	3	5	27	15	+12	23	Qualification for the championship play–offs
3	S.C. Faetano	18	8	5	5	31	20	+11	21	Qualification for the championship play–offs
4	A.C. Libertas	18	8	4	6	34	26	+8	20	Qualification for the championship play–offs
5	S.P. Domagnano	18	5	9	4	27	27	0	19	
6	S.P. La Fiorita	18	6	6	6	24	25	−1	18	
7	G.S. Dogana	18	6	6	6	18	25	−7	18	
8	S.S. Montevito	18	4	8	6	17	21	−4	16	
9	S.S. Murata	18	3	8	7	23	26	−3	14	Relegation to Serie A2
10	S.P. Cailungo	18	1	3	14	17	43	−26	5	Relegation to Serie A2

Source: rsssf.com

== Championship playoff ==
=== Results ===
==== First round ====
- A.C. Libertas 5-1 S.S. Virtus
- S.C. Faetano 0-0 (pen 6-7) S.S. San Giovanni

==== Second round ====
- S.S. Virtus 4-3 S.C. Faetano
- A.C. Libertas 3-2 S.S. San Giovanni

==== Third round ====
- S.S. Virtus 1-0 S.S. San Giovanni
- S.S. Folgore/Falciano 1-1 (pen4-5) A.C. Libertas

==== Fourth round ====
- S.S. Folgore/Falciano 1-2 S.S. Virtus
- S.P. Tre Fiori 2-0 A.C. Libertas

==== Semifinal ====
- A.C. Libertas 0-0 (pen 7-8) S.S. Virtus

==== Final ====
- S.P. Tre Fiori 3-3 (pen6-5) S.S. Virtus

=== Bracket ===
First round
4	Libertas	5
1A2	Virtus	1
3	Faetano	0 (6)
2A2	San Giovanni	0 (7)

Second round (game C)
Libertas	3
San Giovanni	2
Second round (game D)
Virtus	4
Faetano	3

Third Round
2	Folgore	1 (4)
Libertas	1 (5)
Virtus	1
San Giovanni	0

Fourth Round
1	Tre Fiori	2
Libertas	0
Folgore	1
Virtus	2

Semifinal
Libertas	0 (7)
Virtus	0 (8)

Final
Tre Fiori	3 (6)
Virtus	3 (5)
