= 1993–94 Campionato Sammarinese di Calcio =

Campionato Sammarinese di Calcio
- Season: 1993–94
- Champions: S.P. Tre Fiori

The 1993–94 Campionato Sammarinese di Calcio season was the 9th season since its establishment. It was contested by 10 teams, and S.P. Tre Fiori won the championship.

== Regular season ==
Pos	Team	Pld	W	D	L	GF	GA	GD	Pts	Qualification or relegation
1	S.P. Tre Fiori	18	11	5	2	44	17	+27	27	Qualification for the championship play–offs
2	S.C. Faetano	18	9	6	3	19	15	+4	24	Qualification for the championship play–offs
3	F.C. Domagnano	18	8	6	4	25	12	+13	22	Qualification for the championship play–offs
4	S.S. Murata	18	7	6	5	23	23	0	20	Qualification for the championship play–offs
5	S.S. Juvenes	18	7	4	7	21	17	+4	18	
6	A.C. Libertas	18	5	6	7	25	26	−1	16	
7	S.S. Cosmos	18	6	4	8	26	42	−16	16	
8	S.P. Cailungo	18	4	6	8	20	30	−10	14	
9	S.S. Folgore/Falciano	18	3	6	9	13	23	−10	12	Relegation to the Serie A2
10	S.S. Montevito	18	1	9	8	16	27	−11	11	Relegation to the Serie A2

Source: rsssf.com

=== Results ===
Home \ Away	CAI	COS	DOM	FAE	FOL	JUV	LIB	MON	MUR	TFI
Cailungo		1–1	1–2	0–1	1–0	1–2	2–0	3–1	2–3	0–1
Cosmos	2–3		1–4	1–2	3–0	1–0	5–2	1–0	5–2	0–6
Domagnano	0–0	7–0		1–2	2–0	0–2	0–0	1–1	0–0	1–0
Faetano	1–0	3–2	1–0		0–2	0–0	0–0	2–1	0–0	2–1
Folgore	0–0	1–1	0–0	1–1		0–1	2–0	0–0	2–3	1–5
Juvenes	1–1	0–1	0–1	1–0	2–1		0–0	2–2	1–2	1–2
Libertas	6–0	4–0	0–3	0–0	1–2	3–2		1–1	0–0	1–3
Montevito	1–1	1–1	1–1	1–2	2–1	0–3	1–3		2–3	1–1
Murata	1–1	1–1	0–1	2–0	1–0	1–3	1–2	1–0		1–2
Tre Fiori	7–3	5–0	3–1	2–2	0–0	1–0	4–2	0–0	1–1	

Legend: Blue = home team win; Yellow = draw; Red = away team win.

== Championship playoff ==
=== First round ===
- S.P. La Fiorita 3-3 (pen 5-4 ) S.C. Faetano
- F.C. Domagnano 3-1 S.S. Murata

=== Second round ===
- S.C. Faetano 3-1 S.S. Murata
- S.P. La Fiorita 1-2 F.C. Domagnano

=== Third round ===
- S.P. La Fiorita 2-1 S.C. Faetano
- F.C. Domagnano 1-1 (pen 3-5 ) S.P. Tre Fiori

=== Semifinal ===
- S.P. La Fiorita 0-0 (pen 4-2 ) F.C. Domagnano

=== Final ===
- S.P. Tre Fiori 2-0 S.P. La Fiorita
