= 1990–91 Campionato Sammarinese di Calcio =

Campionato Sammarinese di Calcio
- Season: 1990–91
- Champions: S.C. Faetano

The 1990–91 Campionato Sammarinese di Calcio season was the 6th season since its establishment. It was contested by 10 teams, and S.C. Faetano won the championship.

== Regular season ==
Pos	Team	Pld	W	D	L	GF	GA	GD	Pts	Qualification or relegation
1	S.P. Tre Fiori	18	11	4	3	34	18	+16	26	Qualification for the championship play–offs
2	S.S. Montevito	18	9	5	4	32	22	+10	23	Qualification for the championship play–offs
3	S.C. Faetano	18	9	4	5	36	22	+14	22	Qualification for the championship play–offs
4	S.S. Folgore/Falciano	18	8	6	4	23	17	+6	22	Qualification for the championship play–offs
5	S.P. Domagnano	18	8	5	5	35	19	+16	21	
6	S.S. Cosmos	18	7	6	5	30	26	+4	20	
7	A.C. Libertas	18	4	9	5	21	22	−1	17	
8	S.S. Murata	18	3	9	6	22	30	−8	15	
9	S.P. La Fiorita	18	2	3	13	16	46	−30	7	Relegation to the Serie A2
10	S.S. Virtus	18	1	5	12	22	49	−27	7	Relegation to the Serie A2

Source: rsssf.com

=== Results ===
Home \ Away	COS	DOM	FAE	FOL	LFI	LIB	MON	MUR	TFI	VIR
Cosmos		1–1	0–1	3–0	2–1	1–1	4–1	1–1	0–0	4–0
Domagnano	7–1		2–1	1–0	1–2	3–0	2–0	0–1	3–1	1–1
Faetano	4–3	1–0		3–0	3–2	3–0	1–2	5–1	0–2	1–1
Folgore	1–0	3–1	1–1		3–0	2–2	0–0	2–0	0–0	3–0
La Fiorita	1–3	0–2	0–2	0–2		0–2	0–2	1–1	2–6	3–2
Libertas	0–0	0–0	1–1	0–1	3–0		1–3	1–1	2–2	1–1
Montevito	1–2	2–2	2–1	1–1	7–1	0–0		1–1	0–1	4–2
Murata	2–2	2–2	1–1	1–1	1–1	1–3	1–2		3–4	0–2
Tre Fiori	4–2	3–1	2–1	2–0	2–0	1–0	0–1	0–1		1–1
Virtus	0–1	0–6	2–6	2–3	2–2	2–4	2–3	1–3	1–3	

Legend: Blue = home team win; Yellow = draw; Red = away team win.

== Championship playoff ==
=== First round ===
- S.C. Faetano 3-0 S.S. Folgore/Falciano
- S.S. Juvenes 4-2 S.S. Montevito

=== Second round ===
- S.S. Folgore/Falciano 0-1 S.S. Montevito
- S.C. Faetano 2-1 S.S. Juvenes

=== Third round ===
- S.S. Juvenes 2-1 S.S. Montevito
- S.P. Tre Fiori 4-1 S.C. Faetano

=== Semifinal ===
- S.C. Faetano 3-1 S.S. Juvenes

=== Final ===
- S.C. Faetano 1-0 S.P. Tre Fiori
