= 1988–89 Campionato Sammarinese di Calcio =

Campionato Sammarinese di Calcio
- Season: 1988–89
- Champions: S.P. Domagnano

The 1988–89 Campionato Sammarinese di Calcio season was the 4th season since its establishment. It was contested by 10 teams, and S.P. Domagnano won the championship defeating S.P. La Fiorita 2-1 in the finals.

== Regular season ==
Pos	Team	Pld	W	D	L	GF	GA	GD	Pts	Qualification or relegation
1	A.C. Libertas	18	9	7	2	32	14	+18	25	Qualification for the championship play–offs
2	S.P. La Fiorita	18	9	7	2	22	8	+14	25	Qualification for the championship play–offs
3	S.P. Domagnano	18	8	8	2	27	13	+14	24	Qualification for the championship play–offs
4	S.C. Faetano	18	8	5	5	26	17	+9	21	Qualification for the championship play–offs
5	G.S. Dogana	18	6	9	3	21	15	+6	21	
6	S.S. Folgore/Falciano	18	6	7	5	22	19	+3	19	
7	S.S. Virtus	18	5	7	6	20	25	−5	17	
8	S.P. Tre Fiori	18	4	7	7	16	18	−2	15	
9	S.S. Montevito	18	4	3	11	15	37	−22	11	Relegation to the Serie A2
10	S.S. San Giovanni	18	2	2	14	11	38	−27	6	Relegation to the Serie A2

Source: rsssf.com

== Championship playoff ==
=== First round ===
- S.C. Faetano 0-0 (pen 4-3) F.C. Domagnano
- S.S. Murata 2-0 S.P. Cailungo

=== Second round ===
- F.C. Domagnano 0-0 (pen 4-2) S.S. Murata
- S.C. Faetano 4-1 S.P. Cailungo

=== Third round ===
- F.C. Domagnano 2-0 S.S. Murata
- S.P. La Fiorita 0-0 (pen 5-4) S.C. Faetano

=== Fourth round ===
- F.C. Domagnano 1-0 S.C. Faetano
- S.P. La Fiorita 1-0 A.C. Libertas

=== Semifinal ===
- A.C. Libertas 0-1 F.C. Domagnano

=== Final ===
- F.C. Domagnano 2-1 S.P. La Fiorita
