= 1994–95 Campionato Sammarinese di Calcio =

Campionato Sammarinese di Calcio
- Season: 1994–95
- Champions: S.P. Tre Fiori

The 1994–95 Campionato Sammarinese di Calcio season was the 10th season since its establishment. It was contested by 10 teams, and S.P. Tre Fiori won the championship.

== Regular season ==
Pos	Team	Pld	W	D	L	GF	GA	GD	Pts	Qualification or relegation
1	S.P. Tre Fiori	18	12	2	4	36	15	+21	26	Qualification for the championship play–offs
2	S.S. Cosmos	18	9	6	3	29	20	+9	24	Qualification for the championship play–offs
3	F.C. Domagnano	18	9	5	4	29	17	+12	23	Qualification for the championship play–offs
4	S.P. La Fiorita	18	10	3	5	24	25	−1	23	Qualification for the championship play–offs
5	S.S. Murata	18	8	6	4	22	16	+6	22	
6	S.P. Cailungo	18	4	6	8	18	26	−8	14	
7	S.S. Virtus	18	3	8	7	12	20	−8	14	
8	S.C. Faetano	18	5	3	10	26	24	+2	13	
9	A.C. Libertas	18	4	5	9	25	32	−7	13	Relegation to the Serie A2
10	S.S. Juvenes	18	2	4	12	18	44	−26	8	Relegation to the Serie A2

Source: rsssf.com

=== Results ===
Home \ Away	CAI	COS	DOM	FAE	JUV	LFI	LIB	MUR	TFI	VIR
Cailungo		2–3	2–1	2–1	1–0	0–1	1–0	0–0	1–1	1–1
Cosmos	2–1		1–3	0–3	1–0	3–0	2–0	0–0	2–1	3–0
Domagnano	2–1	1–3		1–1	3–2	1–0	3–0	1–2	0–1	0–0
Faetano	3–0	1–2	0–1		1–2	0–1	5–2	1–2	1–1	0–2
Juvenes	0–0	2–2	3–8	2–5		1–1	1–7	1–2	1–2	3–2
La Fiorita	3–2	1–1	1–1	2–1	2–0		3–1	1–0	2–1	1–0
Libertas	1–1	3–3	0–0	2–1	3–0	4–0		0–0	2–7	0–1
Murata	2–1	1–1	0–0	1–2	2–0	7–0	1–0		0–3	1–0
Tre Fiori	4–1	1–0	0–2	1–0	2–0	1–0	3–0	4–0		1–2
Virtus	1–1	0–0	0–1	0–0	0–0	1–5	0–0	1–1	1–2	

Legend: Blue = home team win; Yellow = draw; Red = away team win.

== Championship playoff ==
=== First round ===
- S.S. Cosmos 2-3 S.P. La Fiorita
- S.S. San Giovanni 0-3 F.C. Domagnano

=== Second round ===
- S.S. San Giovanni 0-1 S.S. Cosmos
- F.C. Domagnano 0-2 S.P. La Fiorita

=== Third round ===
- F.C. Domagnano 2-4 S.S. Cosmos
- S.P. Tre Fiori 0-0 (pen 6-5 ) S.P. La Fiorita

=== Fourth round ===
- S.P. La Fiorita 1-0 S.S. Cosmos

=== Final ===
- S.P. Tre Fiori 1-0 S.P. La Fiorita
