= 1992–93 Campionato Sammarinese di Calcio =

Football League

Campionato Sammarinese di Calcio
- Season: 1992–93
- Champions: S.P. Tre Fiori

The 1992–93 Campionato Sammarinese di Calcio season was the 8th season since its establishment. It was contested by 10 teams, and S.P. Tre Fiori won the championship.

== Regular season ==
| Pos | Team | Pld | W | D | L | GF | GA | GD | Pts | Qualification or relegation |
|---|---|---|---|---|---|---|---|---|---|---|
| 1 | S.P. Tre Fiori | 18 | 11 | 4 | 3 | 35 | 11 | +24 | 26 | Qualification for the championship play–offs |
| 2 | F.C. Domagnano | 18 | 9 | 6 | 3 | 23 | 13 | +10 | 24 | Qualification for the championship play–offs |
| 3 | S.P. Cailungo | 18 | 8 | 6 | 4 | 27 | 21 | +6 | 22 | Qualification for the championship play–offs |
| 4 | A.C. Libertas | 18 | 9 | 4 | 5 | 42 | 24 | +18 | 22 | Qualification for the championship play–offs |
| 5 | S.C. Faetano | 18 | 8 | 4 | 6 | 22 | 17 | +5 | 20 | |
| 6 | S.S. Montevito | 18 | 6 | 7 | 5 | 25 | 26 | −1 | 19 | |
| 7 | S.S. Murata | 18 | 3 | 10 | 5 | 13 | 24 | −11 | 16 | |
| 8 | S.S. Juvenes | 18 | 5 | 3 | 10 | 22 | 13 | +9 | 13 | |
| 9 | S.P. Tre Penne | 18 | 3 | 4 | 11 | 27 | 41 | −14 | 10 | Relegation to the Serie A2 |
| 10 | S.S. Virtus | 18 | 2 | 4 | 12 | 16 | 49 | −33 | 8 | Relegation to the Serie A2 |

Source: rsssf.com

=== Results ===
| Home \ Away | CAI | DOM | FAE | JUV | LIB | MON | MUR | TFI | TPE | VIR |
|---|---|---|---|---|---|---|---|---|---|---|
| Cailungo | | 3–1 | 0–0 | 1–0 | 2–1 | 1–1 | 0–1 | 0–2 | 2–1 | 2–0 |
| Domagnano | 3–2 | | 0–1 | 2–1 | 3–0 | 0–0 | 0–0 | 1–0 | 2–1 | 0–0 |
| Faetano | 0–1 | 2–0 | | 1–3 | 3–1 | 1–1 | 0–1 | 1–0 | 0–0 | 4–2 |
| Juvenes | 2–2 | 0–0 | 1–2 | | 0–1 | 0–1 | 0–1 | 0–1 | 2–0 | 1–2 |
| Libertas | 3–3 | 1–2 | 1–0 | 4–1 | | 1–1 | 5–1 | 1–4 | 7–0 | 3–1 |
| Montevito | 1–0 | 0–1 | 2–1 | 1–2 | 1–2 | | 1–1 | 1–1 | 5–2 | 2–2 |
| Murata | 0–0 | 1–1 | 1–2 | 1–1 | 1–1 | 2–3 | | 0–0 | 0–1 | 0–0 |
| Tre Fiori | 1–2 | 0–0 | 2–0 | 1–0 | 0–0 | 3–2 | 4–0 | | 2–1 | 6–0 |
| Tre Penne | 3–3 | 1–2 | 0–0 | 0–1 | 1–3 | 3–0 | 1–1 | 2–6 | | 7–4 |
| Virtus | 1–3 | 0–2 | 1–4 | 1–3 | 0–7 | 0–2 | 1–1 | 0–2 | 1–0 | |

Legend: Blue = home team win; Yellow = draw; Red = away team win.

== Championship playoff ==
=== First round ===
- F.C. Domagnano 5-1 S.P. Cailungo
- S.S. Folgore/Falciano 6-6 (pen 4-3 ) A.C. Libertas

=== Second round ===
- A.C. Libertas 2-2 (pen 3-2 ) S.P. Cailungo
- S.S. Folgore/Falciano 2-1 F.C. Domagnano

=== Third round ===
- F.C. Domagnano 2-0 A.C. Libertas
- S.P. Tre Fiori 3-0 S.S. Folgore/Falciano

=== Semifinal ===
- S.S. Folgore/Falciano 1-2 F.C. Domagnano

=== Final ===
- S.P. Tre Fiori 2-0 F.C. Domagnano
