= Adam Adami =

Adam Adami may refer to:

- Adam Adami (diplomat) (died 1663), German diplomat and priest
- Adam Adami (footballer) (born 1992), Brazilian footballer who plays for Tre Fiori
