= 2024–25 UEFA Champions League =

European football tournament

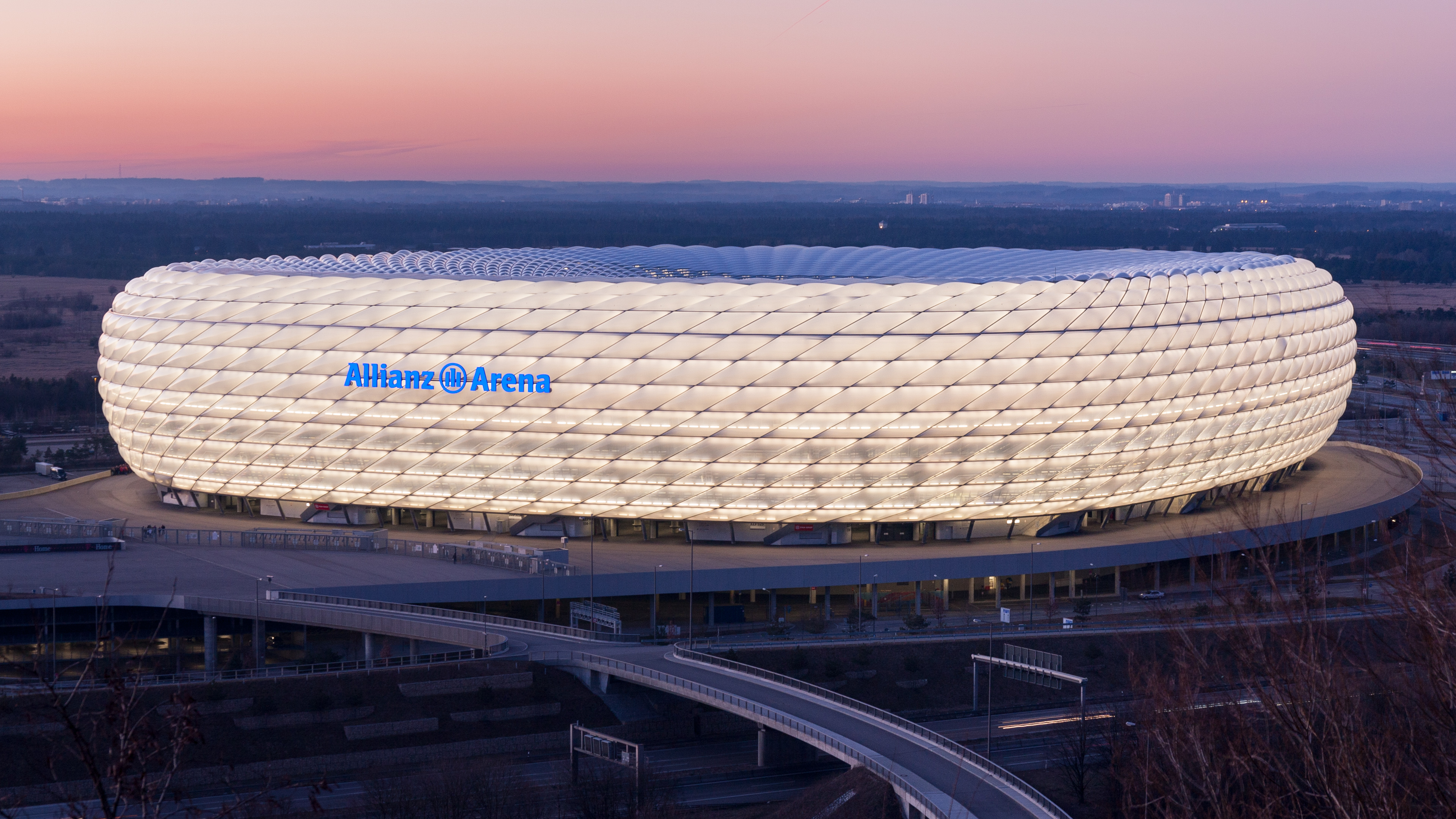
- Allianz Arena in Munich hosted the final

Tournament details
- Dates: Qualifying: 9 July – 28 August 2024; Competition proper: 17 September 2024 – 31 May 2025
- Teams: Competition proper: 36; Total: 81 (from 53 associations)

Final positions
- Champions: (France) Paris Saint-Germain (1st title)
- Runners-up: (Italy) Inter Milan

Tournament statistics
- Matches played: 189
- Goals scored: 618 (3.27 per match)
- Attendance: 8,372,855 (44,301 per match)
- Top scorer(s): Serhou Guirassy (Borussia Dortmund); Raphinha (Barcelona); 13 goals each
- Best player: Ousmane Dembélé (Paris Saint-Germain)
- Best young player: Désiré Doué (Paris Saint-Germain)

The 2024–25 UEFA Champions League was the 70th season of Europe's premier club football tournament organised by UEFA, and the 33rd season since it was rebranded from the European Champion Clubs' Cup to the UEFA Champions League. This was the first season under a new format, which had 36 participating teams that played eight games each against different opponents in a league phase, all the teams being ranked in a joint group. This increased the total number of matches played in the competition from 125 to 189 (excluding qualifying rounds).

Luis Enrique's Paris Saint-Germain defeated Simone Inzaghi's Inter Milan 5–0 in the final, which was held at the Allianz Arena in Munich, Germany, to win their first Champions League title in a record margin of victory. As winners of the Champions League, Paris Saint-Germain automatically qualified for the 2025–26 UEFA Champions League league phase, the 2025 FIFA Intercontinental Cup final, the 2029 FIFA Club World Cup group stage, and earned the right to play against Tottenham Hotspur, the winners of the 2024–25 UEFA Europa League, in the 2025 UEFA Super Cup. Paris Saint-Germain became the second French side to win after Olympique Marseille in the 1992–93 edition and the first team since Porto in the 2003–04 edition that didn't come from England, Germany, Italy or Spain.

Real Madrid were the defending champions, having won a record-extending 15th title in the previous season, but were eliminated by Arsenal in the quarter-finals.

== Association team allocation ==
A total of 81 teams from 53 of the 55 UEFA member associations participated in the 2024–25 UEFA Champions League (the exceptions being Liechtenstein, which did not organise a domestic league, and Russia, which was suspended). The association ranking based on the UEFA association coefficients was used to determine the number of participating teams for each association:

- Associations 1–5 each had four teams.
- Association 6 had three teams.
- Associations 7–15 each had two teams.
- Associations 16–55 (except Liechtenstein and Russia) each had one team.
- The winners of the 2023–24 UEFA Champions League and 2023–24 UEFA Europa League were each given an additional entry if they did not qualify for the 2024–25 UEFA Champions League through their domestic league.
- The two associations who obtained the most coefficient points in the 2023–24 season each had one European Performance Spot into the league phase. The winners of the UEFA Champions League and Europa League could not fill the European Performance Spots.

=== Association ranking ===
For the 2024–25 UEFA Champions League, the associations were allocated places according to their 2023 UEFA association coefficients, which took into account their performance in European competitions from 2018–19 to 2022–23. The table reflects Russia's ongoing suspension from UEFA.

Apart from the allocation based on the association coefficients, associations could have additional teams participating in the Champions League, as noted below:

- (EPS) – European Performance Spot, the additional berths for associations who finished in the top two of the 2023–24 association coefficients
- (TH) – Additional berth for UEFA Champions League title holders
- (EL) – Additional berth for UEFA Europa League title holders

Association ranking for 2024–25 UEFA Champions League

Rank	Association	Coeff.	Teams	Notes
1	England	109.570	4	
2	Spain	92.998	4	
3	Germany	82.481	4	+1 (EPS)
4	Italy	81.926	4	+1 (EPS)
5	France	61.164	4	
6	Netherlands	59.900	3	
7	Portugal	56.216	2	
8	Belgium	42.200	2	
9	Scotland	36.400	2	
10	Austria	34.000	2	
11	Serbia	32.375	2	
12	Turkey	32.100	2	
13	Switzerland	31.675	2	
14	Ukraine	29.500	2	
15	Czech Republic	29.050	2	
16	Norway	29.000	1	
17	Denmark	27.825	1	
18	Russia	26.215	0	
19	Croatia	25.400	1	

Rank	Association	Coeff.	Teams	Notes
20	Greece	25.225	1	
21	Israel	25.000	1	
22	Cyprus	24.475	1	
23	Sweden	23.750	1	
24	Poland	20.750	1	
25	Hungary	20.625	1	
26	Romania	20.500	1	
27	Bulgaria	20.000	1	
28	Slovakia	19.750	1	
29	Azerbaijan	16.625	1	
30	Kazakhstan	12.625	1	
31	Slovenia	12.500	1	
32	Moldova	12.250	1	
33	Kosovo	11.041	1	
34	Liechtenstein	11.000	0	
35	Latvia	10.625	1	
36	Republic of Ireland	10.375	1	
37	Finland	10.200	1	
38	Lithuania	10.000	1	

Rank	Association	Coeff.	Teams	Notes
39	Armenia	9.875	1	
40	Belarus	9.875	1	
41	Bosnia and Herzegovina	9.750	1	
42	Luxembourg	9.000	1	
43	Faroe Islands	8.750	1	
44	Northern Ireland	8.583	1	
45	Malta	8.250	1	
46	Georgia	8.000	1	
47	Estonia	7.582	1	
48	Iceland	7.250	1	
49	Albania	6.250	1	
50	Wales	6.166	1	
51	Gibraltar	5.791	1	
52	North Macedonia	5.500	1	
53	Andorra	5.165	1	
54	Montenegro	4.750	1	
55	San Marino	1.999	1	

=== Distribution ===
		Teams entering in this round	Teams advancing from the previous round
First qualifying round (28 teams)		28 champions from associations 26–28 and 30–55 (except Liechtenstein)	
Second qualifying round (28 teams)	Champions Path (24 teams)	8 champions from associations 15–18 (except Russia) and 20–24; 2 champions from associations 25 and 29 as the teams with highest club coefficients, originally from the first qualifying round	14 winners from the first qualifying round
Second qualifying round (28 teams)	League Path (4 teams)	4 runners-up from associations 11–14	
Third qualifying round (20 teams)	Champions Path (12 teams)		12 winners from the second qualifying round (Champions Path)
Third qualifying round (20 teams)	League Path (8 teams)	2 runners-up from associations 8–9; 1 third-placed team from association 6; 1 fourth-placed team from association 5; 2 runners-up from associations 10 and 15 as the teams with highest club coefficients, originally from the second qualifying round League Path	2 winners from the second qualifying round (League Path)
Play-off round (14 teams)	Champions Path (10 teams)	3 champions from associations 11–13; 1 champion from association 19 as the team with highest club coefficient, originally from the second qualifying round Champions Path	6 winners from the third qualifying round (Champions Path)
Play-off round (14 teams)	League Path (4 teams)		4 winners from the third qualifying round (League Path)
League phase (36 teams)		10 champions from associations 1–10; 6 runners-up from associations 1–6; 5 third-placed teams from associations 1–5; 4 fourth-placed teams from associations 1–4; 1 champion from association 14 as the team with the highest club coefficient, originally from the play-off round of the Champions Path; 1 runner-up from association 7 as the team with the highest club coefficient, originally from the third qualifying round of the League Path; 2 associations (Italy and Germany) with the highest coefficients from the previous season each received an extra berth	5 winners from the play-off round (Champions Path); 2 winners from the play-off round (League Path)
Knockout phase play-offs (16 teams)			16 teams ranked 9–24 from the league phase
Round of 16 (16 teams)			8 teams ranked 1–8 from the league phase; 8 winners from the knockout phase play-offs

The information here reflects the suspension of Russia in European football, and so the following changes to the default access list were made:

- The champions of associations 23 (Sweden) and 24 (Poland) will enter the second qualifying round instead of the first qualifying round (Champions Path).

As the Champions League title holders (Real Madrid) qualified via their domestic league's standard berth allocation, the following changes to the default access list were made:

- Shakhtar Donetsk as the club with the highest club coefficient that would otherwise have entered the Champions Path of the qualifying phase or play-off round, will enter the league phase instead of the Champions Path play-off round.
- Dinamo Zagreb, as the club with the highest club coefficient that would otherwise have entered the Champions Path second qualifying round, will enter the Champions Path play-off round.
- Ferencváros and Qarabağ, as the two clubs with the highest club coefficient that would otherwise have entered the Champions Path first qualifying round, will enter the Champions Path second qualifying round.

As the Europa League title holders (Atalanta) qualified via their domestic league's standard berth allocation, the following changes to the default access list were made:

- Benfica, as the club with the highest club coefficient that would otherwise have entered the League Path third qualifying round, will enter the league phase instead of the League Path third qualifying round.
- Slavia Prague and Red Bull Salzburg, as the two clubs with the highest club coefficient that would otherwise have entered the League Path second qualifying round, will enter the third qualifying round.

=== Teams ===
The labels in the parentheses show how each team qualified for the place of its starting round:

- TH: Champions League title holders
- EL: Europa League title holders
- 1st, 2nd, 3rd, 4th, etc.: League positions of the previous season
- EPS: The European Performance Spots given to clubs from the two associations with the highest coefficient points in 2023–24

The second qualifying round, third qualifying round and play-off round were divided into Champions Path (CH) and League Path (LP).

Qualified teams for 2024–25 UEFA Champions League
Entry round		Teams			
League phase		(Spain) Real Madrid (1st)^{TH}	(Italy) Atalanta (4th)^{EL}	(England) Manchester City (1st)	(England) Arsenal (2nd)
League phase		(England) Liverpool (3rd)	(England) Aston Villa (4th)	(Spain) Barcelona (2nd)	(Spain) Girona (3rd)
League phase		(Spain) Atlético Madrid (4th)	(Germany) Bayer Leverkusen (1st)	(Germany) VfB Stuttgart (2nd)	(Germany) Bayern Munich (3rd)
League phase		(Germany) RB Leipzig (4th)	(Germany) Borussia Dortmund (5th)^{EPS}	(Italy) Inter Milan (1st)	(Italy) Milan (2nd)
League phase		(Italy) Juventus (3rd)	(Italy) Bologna (5th)^{EPS}	(France) Paris Saint-Germain (1st)	(France) Monaco (2nd)
League phase		(France) Brest (3rd)	(Netherlands) PSV Eindhoven (1st)	(Netherlands) Feyenoord (2nd)	(Portugal) Sporting CP (1st)
League phase		(Portugal) Benfica (2nd)	(Belgium) Club Brugge (1st)	(Scotland) Celtic (1st)	(Austria) Sturm Graz (1st)
League phase		(Ukraine) Shakhtar Donetsk (1st)			
Play-off round	CH	(Serbia) Red Star Belgrade (1st)	(Turkey) Galatasaray (1st)	(Switzerland) Young Boys (1st)	(Croatia) Dinamo Zagreb (1st)
Third qualifying round	LP	(France) Lille (4th)	(Netherlands) Twente (3rd)	(Belgium) Union Saint-Gilloise (2nd)	(Scotland) Rangers (2nd)
Third qualifying round	LP	(Austria) Red Bull Salzburg (2nd)	(Czech Republic) Slavia Prague (2nd)		
Second qualifying round	CH	(Czech Republic) Sparta Prague (1st)	(Norway) Bodø/Glimt (1st)	(Denmark) Midtjylland (1st)	(Greece) PAOK (1st)
Second qualifying round	CH	(Israel) Maccabi Tel Aviv (1st)	(Cyprus) APOEL (1st)	(Sweden) Malmö FF (1st)	(Poland) Jagiellonia Białystok (1st)
Second qualifying round	CH	(Hungary) Ferencváros (1st)	(Azerbaijan) Qarabağ (1st)		
Second qualifying round	LP	(Serbia) Partizan (2nd)	(Turkey) Fenerbahçe (2nd)	(Switzerland) Lugano (2nd)	(Ukraine) Dynamo Kyiv (2nd)
First qualifying round	CH	(Romania) FCSB (1st)	(Bulgaria) Ludogorets Razgrad (1st)	(Slovakia) Slovan Bratislava (1st)	(Kazakhstan) Ordabasy (1st)
First qualifying round	CH	(Slovenia) Celje (1st)	(Moldova) Petrocub Hîncești (1st)	(Kosovo) Ballkani (1st)	(Latvia) RFS (1st)
First qualifying round	CH	(Republic of Ireland) Shamrock Rovers (1st)	(Finland) HJK (1st)	(Lithuania) Panevėžys (1st)	(Armenia) Pyunik (1st)
First qualifying round	CH	(Belarus) Dinamo Minsk (1st)	(Bosnia and Herzegovina) Borac Banja Luka (1st)	(Luxembourg) Differdange 03 (1st)	(Faroe Islands) KÍ (1st)
First qualifying round	CH	(Northern Ireland) Larne (1st)	(Malta) Hamrun Spartans (1st)	(Georgia (country)) Dinamo Batumi (1st)	(Estonia) Flora (1st)
First qualifying round	CH	(Iceland) Víkingur Reykjavík (1st)	(Albania) Egnatia (1st)	(Wales) The New Saints (1st)	(Gibraltar) Lincoln Red Imps (1st)
First qualifying round	CH	(North Macedonia) Struga (1st)	(Andorra) UE Santa Coloma (1st)	(Montenegro) Dečić (1st)	(San Marino) Virtus (1st)

1. Liechtenstein (LIE): The seven teams affiliated with the Liechtenstein Football Association (LFV) all played in the Swiss football league system. The only competition organised by the LFV was the Liechtenstein Football Cup – the winners of which qualified for the UEFA Conference League for the 2024–25 season.
2. Russia (RUS): On 28 February 2022, Russian football clubs and national teams were suspended from FIFA and UEFA competitions due to the Russian invasion of Ukraine. The tables reflect Russia's ongoing suspension from UEFA competitions.

== Schedule ==
The schedule of the competition was as follows. Compared to past seasons, one "exclusive week" was introduced in which Thursday was also a matchday. All matches in other weeks were played on Tuesdays and Wednesdays apart from the final.

Schedule for 2024–25 UEFA Champions League
Phase	Round	Draw date	First leg	Second leg
Qualifying	First qualifying round	18 June 2024	9–10 July 2024	16–17 July 2024
Qualifying	Second qualifying round	19 June 2024	23–24 July 2024	30–31 July 2024
Qualifying	Third qualifying round	22 July 2024	6–7 August 2024	13 August 2024
Play-offs	Play-off round	5 August 2024	20–21 August 2024	27–28 August 2024
League phase	Matchday 1	29 August 2024	17–19 September 2024	
League phase	Matchday 2	29 August 2024	1–2 October 2024	
League phase	Matchday 3	29 August 2024	22–23 October 2024	
League phase	Matchday 4	29 August 2024	5–6 November 2024	
League phase	Matchday 5	29 August 2024	26–27 November 2024	
League phase	Matchday 6	29 August 2024	10–11 December 2024	
League phase	Matchday 7	29 August 2024	21–22 January 2025	
League phase	Matchday 8	29 August 2024	29 January 2025	
Knockout phase	Knockout phase play-offs	31 January 2025	11–12 February 2025	18–19 February 2025
Knockout phase	Round of 16	21 February 2025	4–5 March 2025	11–12 March 2025
Knockout phase	Quarter-finals	21 February 2025	8–9 April 2025	15–16 April 2025
Knockout phase	Semi-finals	21 February 2025	29–30 April 2025	6–7 May 2025
Knockout phase	Final	—N/a	31 May 2025 at Allianz Arena, Munich	

== Qualifying rounds ==
=== First qualifying round ===
The draw for the first qualifying round was held on 18 June 2024. The first legs were played on 9 and 10 July, and the second legs were played on 16 and 17 July 2024.

The winners of the ties advanced to the Champions Path second qualifying round. 12 of the 14 losers were transferred to the Conference League Champions Path second qualifying round and 2 were transferred to the Conference League Champions Path qualifying and received a bye to the third qualifying round.

First qualifying round
Team 1	Agg.	Team 2	1st leg	2nd leg
Slovan Bratislava (Slovakia)	6–3	(North Macedonia) Struga	4–2	2–1
The New Saints (Wales)	4–1	(Montenegro) Dečić	3–0	1–1
Borac Banja Luka (Bosnia and Herzegovina)	2–2 (4–1 p)	(Albania) Egnatia	1–0	1–2 (a.e.t.)
Hamrun Spartans (Malta)	1–1 (4–5 p)	(Gibraltar) Lincoln Red Imps	0–1	1–0 (a.e.t.)
UE Santa Coloma (Andorra)	3–3 (6–5 p) (Note: Order of legs reversed after original draw.)	(Kosovo) Ballkani	1–2	2–1 (a.e.t.)
Flora (Estonia)	1–7	(Slovenia) Celje	0–5	1–2
KÍ (Faroe Islands)	2–0	(Luxembourg) Differdange 03	2–0	0–0
Panevėžys (Lithuania)	4–1	(Finland) HJK	3–0	1–1
RFS (Latvia)	7–0	(Northern Ireland) Larne	3–0	4–0
Víkingur Reykjavík (Iceland)	1–2	(Republic of Ireland) Shamrock Rovers	0–0	1–2
Virtus (San Marino)	1–11	(Romania) FCSB	1–7	0–4
Ludogorets Razgrad (Bulgaria)	3–2	(Georgia (country)) Dinamo Batumi	3–1	0–1
Ordabasy (Kazakhstan)	0–1	(Moldova) Petrocub Hîncești	0–0	0–1
Dinamo Minsk (Belarus)	1–0	(Armenia) Pyunik	0–0	1–0

=== Second qualifying round ===
The draw for the second qualifying round was held on 19 June 2024. The first legs were played on 23 and 24 July, and the second legs were played on 30 and 31 July 2024.

The winners of the ties advanced to the third qualifying round of their respective path. The Champions Path losers were transferred to the Europa League Champions Path third qualifying round, while the League Path losers were transferred to the Europa League Main Path third qualifying round.

Second qualifying round
Team 1	Agg.	Team 2	1st leg	2nd leg
Champions Path
Ludogorets Razgrad (Bulgaria)	2–1	(Belarus) Dinamo Minsk	2–0	0–1
APOEL (Cyprus)	2–1	(Moldova) Petrocub Hîncești	1–0	1–1
Ferencváros (Hungary)	7–1	(Wales) The New Saints	5–0	2–1
PAOK (Greece)	4–2	(Bosnia and Herzegovina) Borac Banja Luka	3–2	1–0
Bodø/Glimt (Norway)	7–1	(Latvia) RFS	4–0	3–1
Malmö FF (Sweden)	6–4	(Faroe Islands) KÍ	4–1	2–3
Shamrock Rovers (Republic of Ireland)	2–6	(Czech Republic) Sparta Prague	0–2	2–4
UE Santa Coloma (Andorra)	0–4	(Denmark) Midtjylland	0–3	0–1
Celje (Slovenia)	1–6	(Slovakia) Slovan Bratislava	1–1	0–5
Panevėžys (Lithuania)	1–7	(Poland) Jagiellonia Białystok	0–4	1–3
Lincoln Red Imps (Gibraltar)	0–7	(Azerbaijan) Qarabağ	0–2	0–5
FCSB (Romania)	2–1	(Israel) Maccabi Tel Aviv	1–1	1–0
League Path
Lugano (Switzerland)	4–6	(Turkey) Fenerbahçe	3–4	1–2
Dynamo Kyiv (Ukraine)	9–2	(Serbia) Partizan	6–2	3–0

=== Third qualifying round ===
The draw for the third qualifying round was held on 22 July 2024. The first legs were played on 6 and 7 August, and the second legs were played on 13 August 2024.

The winners of the ties advanced to the play-off round of their respective paths. The Champions Path losers were transferred to the Europa League play-off round, while the League Path losers were transferred to the Europa League league phase.

Third qualifying round
Team 1	Agg.	Team 2	1st leg	2nd leg
Champions Path
Qarabağ (Azerbaijan)	8–4	(Bulgaria) Ludogorets Razgrad	1–2	7–2 (a.e.t.)
Slovan Bratislava (Slovakia)	2–0	(Cyprus) APOEL	2–0	0–0
Sparta Prague (Czech Republic)	4–3	(Romania) FCSB	1–1	3–2
Malmö FF (Sweden)	6–5	(Greece) PAOK	2–2	4–3 (a.e.t.)
Midtjylland (Denmark)	3–1	(Hungary) Ferencváros	2–0	1–1
Jagiellonia Białystok (Poland)	1–5	(Norway) Bodø/Glimt	0–1	1–4
League Path
Slavia Prague (Czech Republic)	4–1	(Belgium) Union Saint-Gilloise	3–1	1–0
Lille (France)	3–2	(Turkey) Fenerbahçe	2–1	1–1 (a.e.t.)
Dynamo Kyiv (Ukraine)	3–1	(Scotland) Rangers	1–1	2–0
Red Bull Salzburg (Austria)	5–4	(Netherlands) Twente	2–1	3–3

== Play-off round ==
The draw for the play-off round was held on 5 August 2024. The first legs were played on 20 and 21 August, and the second legs were played on 27 and 28 August 2024.

The winners of the ties advanced to the league phase. The losers were transferred to the Europa League league phase.

Play-off round
Team 1	Agg.	Team 2	1st leg	2nd leg
Champions Path
Young Boys (Switzerland)	4–2	(Turkey) Galatasaray	3–2	1–0
Dinamo Zagreb (Croatia)	5–0	(Azerbaijan) Qarabağ	3–0	2–0
Midtjylland (Denmark)	3–4	(Slovakia) Slovan Bratislava	1–1	2–3
Bodø/Glimt (Norway)	2–3	(Serbia) Red Star Belgrade	2–1	0–2
Malmö FF (Sweden)	0–4	(Czech Republic) Sparta Prague	0–2	0–2
League Path
Lille (France)	3–2	(Czech Republic) Slavia Prague	2–0	1–2
Dynamo Kyiv (Ukraine)	1–3	(Austria) Red Bull Salzburg	0–2	1–1

== League phase ==
Location of teams of the 2024–25 UEFA Champions League league phase

The league phase draw for the 2024–25 UEFA Champions League took place at the Grimaldi Forum in Monaco on 29 August 2024, 18:00 CEST. The 36 teams were divided into four pots of nine teams each based on their UEFA club coefficient, except for the Champions League title holders, who were automatically placed as the top seed in pot 1.

The 36 teams were manually drawn and then, the automated software digitally drew their eight different opponents at random, determining which of their matches were at home and which ones away. Each team faced two opponents from each of the four pots, one at home and one away. Teams could not face opponents from their own association, and could only be drawn against a maximum of two sides from the same association.

Aston Villa, Bologna, Brest, Girona and Slovan Bratislava made their debut appearances since the introduction of the group stage, with Brest and Girona both qualifying for European football for the first time in their history. For the first time in their history, France had four clubs in the Champions League main stage.

A total of 16 national associations were represented in the league phase.

=== Table ===
The top eight ranked teams received a bye to the round of 16. The teams ranked from 9th to 24th contested the knockout phase play-offs, with the teams ranked from 9th to 16th seeded for the draw, while those ranked 17th to 24th were not. Teams ranked from 25th to 36th were eliminated from all competitions, with no access to the 2024–25 UEFA Europa League.

Pos	Team	Pld	W	D	L	GF	GA	GD	Pts	Qualification
1	(The Football Association) Liverpool	8	7	0	1	17	5	+12	21	Advance to round of 16 (seeded)
2	(Royal Spanish Football Federation) Barcelona	8	6	1	1	28	13	+15	19	Advance to round of 16 (seeded)
3	(The Football Association) Arsenal	8	6	1	1	16	3	+13	19	Advance to round of 16 (seeded)
4	(Italian Football Federation) Inter Milan	8	6	1	1	11	1	+10	19	Advance to round of 16 (seeded)
5	(Royal Spanish Football Federation) Atlético Madrid	8	6	0	2	20	12	+8	18	Advance to round of 16 (seeded)
6	(German Football Association) Bayer Leverkusen	8	5	1	2	15	7	+8	16	Advance to round of 16 (seeded)
7	(French Football Federation) Lille	8	5	1	2	17	10	+7	16	Advance to round of 16 (seeded)
8	(The Football Association) Aston Villa	8	5	1	2	13	6	+7	16	Advance to round of 16 (seeded)
9	(Italian Football Federation) Atalanta	8	4	3	1	20	6	+14	15	Advance to knockout phase play-offs (seeded)
10	(German Football Association) Borussia Dortmund	8	5	0	3	22	12	+10	15	Advance to knockout phase play-offs (seeded)
11	(Royal Spanish Football Federation) Real Madrid	8	5	0	3	20	12	+8	15 (Note: Tied on points (15), goal difference (+8), goals scored (20), away goals (6) and wins (5). Ranked on away wins: Real Madrid 2, Bayern Munich 1.)	Advance to knockout phase play-offs (seeded)
12	(German Football Association) Bayern Munich	8	5	0	3	20	12	+8	15	Advance to knockout phase play-offs (seeded)
13	(Italian Football Federation) Milan	8	5	0	3	14	11	+3	15	Advance to knockout phase play-offs (seeded)
14	(Royal Dutch Football Association) PSV Eindhoven	8	4	2	2	16	12	+4	14	Advance to knockout phase play-offs (seeded)
15	(French Football Federation) Paris Saint-Germain	8	4	1	3	14	9	+5	13	Advance to knockout phase play-offs (seeded)
16	(Portuguese Football Federation) Benfica	8	4	1	3	16	12	+4	13	Advance to knockout phase play-offs (seeded)
17	(French Football Federation) Monaco	8	4	1	3	13	13	0	13	Advance to knockout phase play-offs (unseeded)
18	(French Football Federation) Brest	8	4	1	3	10	11	−1	13	Advance to knockout phase play-offs (unseeded)
19	(Royal Dutch Football Association) Feyenoord	8	4	1	3	18	21	−3	13	Advance to knockout phase play-offs (unseeded)
20	(Italian Football Federation) Juventus	8	3	3	2	9	7	+2	12	Advance to knockout phase play-offs (unseeded)
21	(Scottish Football Association) Celtic	8	3	3	2	13	14	−1	12	Advance to knockout phase play-offs (unseeded)
22	(The Football Association) Manchester City	8	3	2	3	18	14	+4	11	Advance to knockout phase play-offs (unseeded)
23	(Portuguese Football Federation) Sporting CP	8	3	2	3	13	12	+1	11	Advance to knockout phase play-offs (unseeded)
24	(Royal Belgian Football Association) Club Brugge	8	3	2	3	7	11	−4	11	Advance to knockout phase play-offs (unseeded)
25	(Croatian Football Federation) Dinamo Zagreb	8	3	2	3	12	19	−7	11	
26	(German Football Association) VfB Stuttgart	8	3	1	4	13	17	−4	10	
27	(Ukrainian Association of Football) Shakhtar Donetsk	8	2	1	5	8	16	−8	7	
28	(Italian Football Federation) Bologna	8	1	3	4	4	9	−5	6	
29	(Football Association of Serbia) Red Star Belgrade	8	2	0	6	13	22	−9	6	
30	(Austrian Football Association) Sturm Graz	8	2	0	6	5	14	−9	6	
31	(Football Association of the Czech Republic) Sparta Prague	8	1	1	6	7	21	−14	4	
32	(German Football Association) RB Leipzig	8	1	0	7	8	15	−7	3	
33	(Royal Spanish Football Federation) Girona	8	1	0	7	5	13	−8	3	
34	(Austrian Football Association) Red Bull Salzburg	8	1	0	7	5	27	−22	3	
35	(Slovak Football Association) Slovan Bratislava	8	0	0	8	7	27	−20	0	
36	(Swiss Football Association) Young Boys	8	0	0	8	3	24	−21	0	

Source: UEFA
Rules for classification: League phase tiebreakers

=== Results ===
Matchday 1
Home team	Score	Away team
Young Boys (Switzerland)	0–3	(England) Aston Villa
Juventus (Italy)	3–1	(Netherlands) PSV Eindhoven
Milan (Italy)	1–3	(England) Liverpool
Bayern Munich (Germany)	9–2	(Croatia) Dinamo Zagreb
Real Madrid (Spain)	3–1	(Germany) VfB Stuttgart
Sporting CP (Portugal)	2–0	(France) Lille
Sparta Prague (Czech Republic)	3–0	(Austria) Red Bull Salzburg
Bologna (Italy)	0–0	(Ukraine) Shakhtar Donetsk
Celtic (Scotland)	5–1	(Slovakia) Slovan Bratislava
Club Brugge (Belgium)	0–3	(Germany) Borussia Dortmund
Manchester City (England)	0–0	(Italy) Inter Milan
Paris Saint-Germain (France)	1–0	(Spain) Girona
Feyenoord (Netherlands)	0–4	(Germany) Bayer Leverkusen
Red Star Belgrade (Serbia)	1–2	(Portugal) Benfica
Monaco (France)	2–1	(Spain) Barcelona
Atalanta (Italy)	0–0	(England) Arsenal
Atlético Madrid (Spain)	2–1	(Germany) RB Leipzig
Brest (France)	2–1	(Austria) Sturm Graz

Matchday 2
Home team	Score	Away team
Red Bull Salzburg (Austria)	0–4	(France) Brest
VfB Stuttgart (Germany)	1–1	(Czech Republic) Sparta Prague
Arsenal (England)	2–0	(France) Paris Saint-Germain
Bayer Leverkusen (Germany)	1–0	(Italy) Milan
Borussia Dortmund (Germany)	7–1	(Scotland) Celtic
Barcelona (Spain)	5–0	(Switzerland) Young Boys
Inter Milan (Italy)	4–0	(Serbia) Red Star Belgrade
PSV Eindhoven (Netherlands)	1–1	(Portugal) Sporting CP
Slovan Bratislava (Slovakia)	0–4	(England) Manchester City
Shakhtar Donetsk (Ukraine)	0–3	(Italy) Atalanta
Girona (Spain)	2–3	(Netherlands) Feyenoord
Aston Villa (England)	1–0	(Germany) Bayern Munich
Dinamo Zagreb (Croatia)	2–2	(France) Monaco
Liverpool (England)	2–0	(Italy) Bologna
Lille (France)	1–0	(Spain) Real Madrid
RB Leipzig (Germany)	2–3	(Italy) Juventus
Sturm Graz (Austria)	0–1	(Belgium) Club Brugge
Benfica (Portugal)	4–0	(Spain) Atlético Madrid

Matchday 3
Home team	Score	Away team
Milan (Italy)	3–1	(Belgium) Club Brugge
Monaco (France)	5–1	(Serbia) Red Star Belgrade
Arsenal (England)	1–0	(Ukraine) Shakhtar Donetsk
Aston Villa (England)	2–0	(Italy) Bologna
Girona (Spain)	2–0	(Slovakia) Slovan Bratislava
Juventus (Italy)	0–1	(Germany) VfB Stuttgart
Paris Saint-Germain (France)	1–1	(Netherlands) PSV Eindhoven
Real Madrid (Spain)	5–2	(Germany) Borussia Dortmund
Sturm Graz (Austria)	0–2	(Portugal) Sporting CP
Atalanta (Italy)	0–0	(Scotland) Celtic
Brest (France)	1–1	(Germany) Bayer Leverkusen
Atlético Madrid (Spain)	1–3	(France) Lille
Young Boys (Switzerland)	0–1	(Italy) Inter Milan
Barcelona (Spain)	4–1	(Germany) Bayern Munich
Red Bull Salzburg (Austria)	0–2	(Croatia) Dinamo Zagreb
Manchester City (England)	5–0	(Czech Republic) Sparta Prague
RB Leipzig (Germany)	0–1	(England) Liverpool
Benfica (Portugal)	1–3	(Netherlands) Feyenoord

Matchday 4
Home team	Score	Away team
PSV Eindhoven (Netherlands)	4–0	(Spain) Girona
Slovan Bratislava (Slovakia)	1–4	(Croatia) Dinamo Zagreb
Bologna (Italy)	0–1	(France) Monaco
Borussia Dortmund (Germany)	1–0	(Austria) Sturm Graz
Celtic (Scotland)	3–1	(Germany) RB Leipzig
Liverpool (England)	4–0	(Germany) Bayer Leverkusen
Lille (France)	1–1	(Italy) Juventus
Real Madrid (Spain)	1–3	(Italy) Milan
Sporting CP (Portugal)	4–1	(England) Manchester City
Club Brugge (Belgium)	1–0	(England) Aston Villa
Shakhtar Donetsk (Ukraine)	2–1	(Switzerland) Young Boys
Sparta Prague (Czech Republic)	1–2	(France) Brest
Inter Milan (Italy)	1–0	(England) Arsenal
Feyenoord (Netherlands)	1–3	(Austria) Red Bull Salzburg
Red Star Belgrade (Serbia)	2–5	(Spain) Barcelona
Paris Saint-Germain (France)	1–2	(Spain) Atlético Madrid
VfB Stuttgart (Germany)	0–2	(Italy) Atalanta
Bayern Munich (Germany)	1–0	(Portugal) Benfica

Matchday 5
Home team	Score	Away team
Sparta Prague (Czech Republic)	0–6	(Spain) Atlético Madrid
Slovan Bratislava (Slovakia)	2–3	(Italy) Milan
Bayer Leverkusen (Germany)	5–0	(Austria) Red Bull Salzburg
Young Boys (Switzerland)	1–6	(Italy) Atalanta
Barcelona (Spain)	3–0	(France) Brest
Bayern Munich (Germany)	1–0	(France) Paris Saint-Germain
Inter Milan (Italy)	1–0	(Germany) RB Leipzig
Manchester City (England)	3–3	(Netherlands) Feyenoord
Sporting CP (Portugal)	1–5	(England) Arsenal
Red Star Belgrade (Serbia)	5–1	(Germany) VfB Stuttgart
Sturm Graz (Austria)	1–0	(Spain) Girona
Monaco (France)	2–3	(Portugal) Benfica
Aston Villa (England)	0–0	(Italy) Juventus
Bologna (Italy)	1–2	(France) Lille
Celtic (Scotland)	1–1	(Belgium) Club Brugge
Dinamo Zagreb (Croatia)	0–3	(Germany) Borussia Dortmund
Liverpool (England)	2–0	(Spain) Real Madrid
PSV Eindhoven (Netherlands)	3–2	(Ukraine) Shakhtar Donetsk

Matchday 6
Home team	Score	Away team
Girona (Spain)	0–1	(England) Liverpool
Dinamo Zagreb (Croatia)	0–0	(Scotland) Celtic
Atalanta (Italy)	2–3	(Spain) Real Madrid
Bayer Leverkusen (Germany)	1–0	(Italy) Inter Milan
Club Brugge (Belgium)	2–1	(Portugal) Sporting CP
Red Bull Salzburg (Austria)	0–3	(France) Paris Saint‑Germain
Shakhtar Donetsk (Ukraine)	1–5	(Germany) Bayern Munich
RB Leipzig (Germany)	2–3	(England) Aston Villa
Brest (France)	1–0	(Netherlands) PSV Eindhoven
Atlético Madrid (Spain)	3–1	(Slovakia) Slovan Bratislava
Lille (France)	3–2	(Austria) Sturm Graz
Milan (Italy)	2–1	(Serbia) Red Star Belgrade
Arsenal (England)	3–0	(France) Monaco
Borussia Dortmund (Germany)	2–3	(Spain) Barcelona
Feyenoord (Netherlands)	4–2	(Czech Republic) Sparta Prague
Juventus (Italy)	2–0	(England) Manchester City
Benfica (Portugal)	0–0	(Italy) Bologna
VfB Stuttgart (Germany)	5–1	(Switzerland) Young Boys

Matchday 7
Home team	Score	Away team
Monaco (France)	1–0	(England) Aston Villa
Atalanta (Italy)	5–0	(Austria) Sturm Graz
Atlético Madrid (Spain)	2–1	(Germany) Bayer Leverkusen
Bologna (Italy)	2–1	(Germany) Borussia Dortmund
Club Brugge (Belgium)	0–0	(Italy) Juventus
Red Star Belgrade (Serbia)	2–3	(Netherlands) PSV Eindhoven
Liverpool (England)	2–1	(France) Lille
Slovan Bratislava (Slovakia)	1–3	(Germany) VfB Stuttgart
Benfica (Portugal)	4–5	(Spain) Barcelona
Shakhtar Donetsk (Ukraine)	2–0	(France) Brest
RB Leipzig (Germany)	2–1	(Portugal) Sporting CP
Milan (Italy)	1–0	(Spain) Girona
Sparta Prague (Czech Republic)	0–1	(Italy) Inter Milan
Arsenal (England)	3–0	(Croatia) Dinamo Zagreb
Celtic (Scotland)	1–0	(Switzerland) Young Boys
Feyenoord (Netherlands)	3–0	(Germany) Bayern Munich
Paris Saint-Germain (France)	4–2	(England) Manchester City
Real Madrid (Spain)	5–1	(Austria) Red Bull Salzburg

Matchday 8
Home team	Score	Away team
Aston Villa (England)	4–2	(Scotland) Celtic
Bayer Leverkusen (Germany)	2–0	(Czech Republic) Sparta Prague
Borussia Dortmund (Germany)	3–1	(Ukraine) Shakhtar Donetsk
Young Boys (Switzerland)	0–1	(Serbia) Red Star Belgrade
Barcelona (Spain)	2–2	(Italy) Atalanta
Bayern Munich (Germany)	3–1	(Slovakia) Slovan Bratislava
Inter Milan (Italy)	3–0	(France) Monaco
Red Bull Salzburg (Austria)	1–4	(Spain) Atlético Madrid
Girona (Spain)	1–2	(England) Arsenal
Dinamo Zagreb (Croatia)	2–1	(Italy) Milan
Juventus (Italy)	0–2	(Portugal) Benfica
Lille (France)	6–1	(Netherlands) Feyenoord
Manchester City (England)	3–1	(Belgium) Club Brugge
PSV Eindhoven (Netherlands)	3–2	(England) Liverpool
Sturm Graz (Austria)	1–0	(Germany) RB Leipzig
Sporting CP (Portugal)	1–1	(Italy) Bologna
Brest (France)	0–3	(Spain) Real Madrid
VfB Stuttgart (Germany)	1–4	(France) Paris Saint-Germain

== Knockout phase ==
In the knockout phase, teams played against each other over two legs on a home-and-away basis, except for the one-match final. The bracket structure for the knockout phase was partially fixed in advance using seeding, with teams' positions in the bracket determined by the final standings in the league phase. In the knockout phase, there was no country protection, with teams from the same association able to face each other in any round. Teams could also face opponents they played during the league phase.

The mechanism of the draws for each round was as follows:

- In the draw for the knockout phase play-offs, the eight teams finishing the league phase in positions 9–16 were seeded, and the eight teams finishing the league phase in positions 17–24 were unseeded. The draw was split into four sections based on the predetermined bracket, with the seeded teams in each section drawn against one of their two possible unseeded opponents. The seeded teams hosted the second leg.
- In the draw for the round of 16, the eight teams finishing the league phase in positions 1–8 were seeded, and the eight winners of the knockout phase play-offs were unseeded. Again, the draw was split into four sections based on the predetermined bracket, with the seeded teams in each section drawn against one of their two possible unseeded opponents. The seeded teams hosted the second leg.
- In the quarter-finals and semi-finals, the exact match pairings were predetermined based on the tournament bracket. A draw was conducted only to determine which team plays the first leg at home. The winner of semi-final 1 was designated as the "home" team for the final (for administrative purposes as it was played at a neutral venue).

=== Bracket ===
Knockout phase play-offs
20	(Italy) Juventus	2	1	3
14	(Netherlands) PSV Eindhoven (a.e.t.)	1	3	4
22	(England) Manchester City	2	1	3
11	(Spain) Real Madrid	3	3	6
18	(France) Brest	0	0	0
15	(France) Paris Saint-Germain	3	7	10
24	(Belgium) Club Brugge	2	3	5
9	(Italy) Atalanta	1	1	2
17	(France) Monaco	0	3	3
16	(Portugal) Benfica	1	3	4
23	(Portugal) Sporting CP	0	0	0
10	(Germany) Borussia Dortmund	3	0	3
21	(Scotland) Celtic	1	1	2
12	(Germany) Bayern Munich	2	1	3
19	(Netherlands) Feyenoord	1	1	2
13	(Italy) Milan	0	1	1

Round of 16
14	(Netherlands) PSV Eindhoven	1	2	3
3	(England) Arsenal	7	2	9
11	(Spain) Real Madrid (p)	2	0	2 (4)
5	(Spain) Atlético Madrid	1	1	2 (2)
15	(France) Paris Saint-Germain (p)	0	1	1 (4)
1	(England) Liverpool	1	0	1 (1)
24	(Belgium) Club Brugge	1	0	1
8	(England) Aston Villa	3	3	6
16	(Portugal) Benfica	0	1	1
2	(Spain) Barcelona	1	3	4
10	(Germany) Borussia Dortmund	1	2	3
7	(France) Lille	1	1	2
12	(Germany) Bayern Munich	3	2	5
6	(Germany) Bayer Leverkusen	0	0	0
19	(Netherlands) Feyenoord	0	1	1
4	(Italy) Inter Milan	2	2	4

Quarter-finals
3	(England) Arsenal	3	2	5
11	(Spain) Real Madrid	0	1	1
15	(France) Paris Saint-Germain	3	2	5
8	(England) Aston Villa	1	3	4
2	(Spain) Barcelona	4	1	5
10	(Germany) Borussia Dortmund	0	3	3
12	(Germany) Bayern Munich	1	2	3
4	(Italy) Inter Milan	2	2	4

Semi-finals
3	(England) Arsenal	0	1	1
15	(France) Paris Saint-Germain	1	2	3
2	(Spain) Barcelona	3	3	6
4	(Italy) Inter Milan (a.e.t.)	3	4	7

Final
31 May – Munich
15	(France) Paris Saint-Germain	5
4	(Italy) Inter Milan	0

=== Knockout phase play-offs ===
The draw for the knockout phase play-offs was held on 31 January 2025, 12:00 CET. The first legs were played on 11 and 12 February, and the second legs were played on 18 and 19 February 2025.

Team 1	Agg.	Team 2	1st leg	2nd leg
Brest (France)	0–10	(France) Paris Saint-Germain	0–3	0–7
Club Brugge (Belgium)	5–2	(Italy) Atalanta	2–1	3–1
Manchester City (England)	3–6	(Spain) Real Madrid	2–3	1–3
Juventus (Italy)	3–4	(Netherlands) PSV Eindhoven	2–1	1–3 (a.e.t.)
Monaco (France)	3–4	(Portugal) Benfica	0–1	3–3
Sporting CP (Portugal)	0–3	(Germany) Borussia Dortmund	0–3	0–0
Celtic (Scotland)	2–3	(Germany) Bayern Munich	1–2	1–1
Feyenoord (Netherlands)	2–1	(Italy) Milan	1–0	1–1

=== Round of 16 ===
The draw for the round of 16 was held on 21 February 2025, 12:00 CET. The first legs were played on 4 and 5 March, and the second legs were played on 11 and 12 March 2025.

In the Atlético Madrid v Real Madrid second leg, Julián Alvarez's penalty shoot-out goal was controversially ruled a miss by VAR due to an accidental double touch as he slipped while kicking. IFAB clarified in June 2025 that in such cases the kick should be retaken.

Team 1	Agg.	Team 2	1st leg	2nd leg
Paris Saint-Germain (France)	1–1 (4–1 p)	(England) Liverpool	0–1	1–0 (a.e.t.)
Club Brugge (Belgium)	1–6	(England) Aston Villa	1–3	0–3
Real Madrid (Spain)	2–2 (4–2 p)	(Spain) Atlético Madrid	2–1	0–1 (a.e.t.)
PSV Eindhoven (Netherlands)	3–9	(England) Arsenal	1–7	2–2
Benfica (Portugal)	1–4	(Spain) Barcelona	0–1	1–3
Borussia Dortmund (Germany)	3–2	(France) Lille	1–1	2–1
Bayern Munich (Germany)	5–0	(Germany) Bayer Leverkusen	3–0	2–0
Feyenoord (Netherlands)	1–4	(Italy) Inter Milan	0–2	1–2

=== Quarter-finals ===
The draw for the order of the quarter-final legs was held on 21 February 2025, 12:00 CET, after the round of 16 draw. The first legs were played on 8 and 9 April, and the second legs were played on 15 and 16 April 2025.

Team 1	Agg.	Team 2	1st leg	2nd leg
Paris Saint-Germain (France)	5–4	(England) Aston Villa	3–1	2–3
Arsenal (England)	5–1	(Spain) Real Madrid	3–0	2–1
Barcelona (Spain)	5–3	(Germany) Borussia Dortmund	4–0	1–3
Bayern Munich (Germany)	3–4	(Italy) Inter Milan	1–2	2–2

=== Semi-finals ===
The draw for the order of the semi-final legs was held on 21 February 2025, 12:00 CET, after the round of 16 and quarter-final draws. The first legs were played on 29 and 30 April, and the second legs were played on 6 and 7 May 2025.

Team 1	Agg.	Team 2	1st leg	2nd leg
Arsenal (England)	1–3	(France) Paris Saint-Germain	0–1	1–2
Barcelona (Spain)	6–7	(Italy) Inter Milan	3–3	3–4 (a.e.t.)

=== Final ===
The final was played on 31 May 2025 at the Allianz Arena in Munich. The winner of semi-final 1 was designated as the "home" team for administrative purposes.

31 May 2025
21:00 UTC+2

Paris Saint-Germain (France)	5–0	(Italy) Inter Milan
Hakimi 12'; Doué 20', 63'; Kvaratskhelia 73'; Mayulu 86'	Report

Allianz Arena, Munich
Attendance: 64,327
Referee: István Kovács (Romania)

== Statistics ==
Statistics exclude qualifying rounds and play-off round.

=== Top goalscorers ===
Rank	Player	Team	Goals	Minutes played
1	(Guinea) Serhou Guirassy	(Germany) Borussia Dortmund	13	1084
1	(Brazil) Raphinha	(Spain) Barcelona	13	1225
3	(Poland) Robert Lewandowski	(Spain) Barcelona	11	985
3	(England) Harry Kane	(Germany) Bayern Munich	11	1120
5	(Argentina) Lautaro Martínez	(Italy) Inter Milan	9	857
6	(Norway) Erling Haaland	(England) Manchester City	8	771
6	(Brazil) Vinícius Júnior	(Spain) Real Madrid	8	1104
6	(France) Ousmane Dembélé	(France) Paris Saint-Germain	8	1163
9	(Canada) Jonathan David	(France) Lille	7	746
9	(Argentina) Julián Alvarez	(Spain) Atlético Madrid	7	790
9	(Greece) Vangelis Pavlidis	(Portugal) Benfica	7	905
9	(France) Kylian Mbappé	(Spain) Real Madrid	7	1132

=== Team of the Season ===
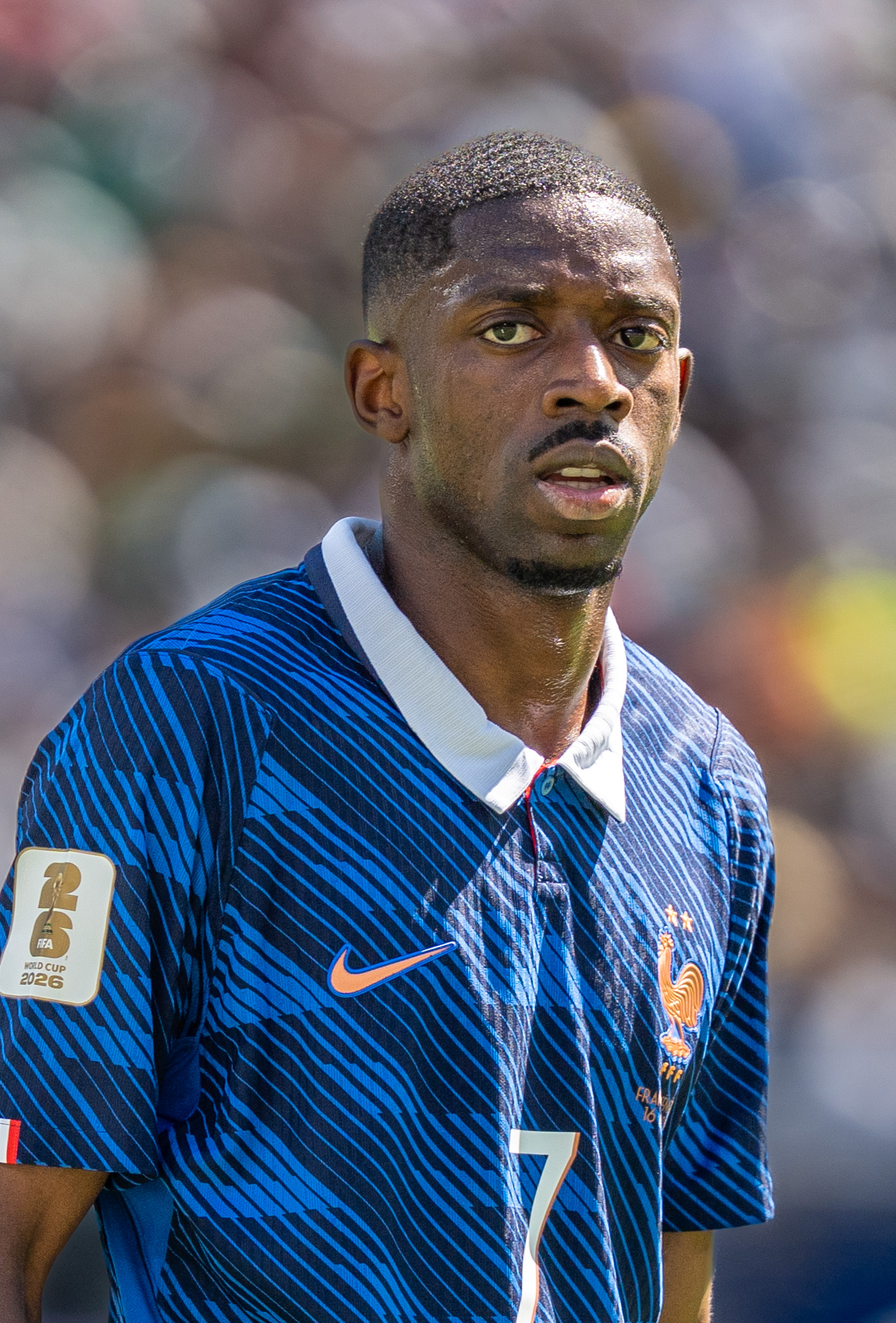
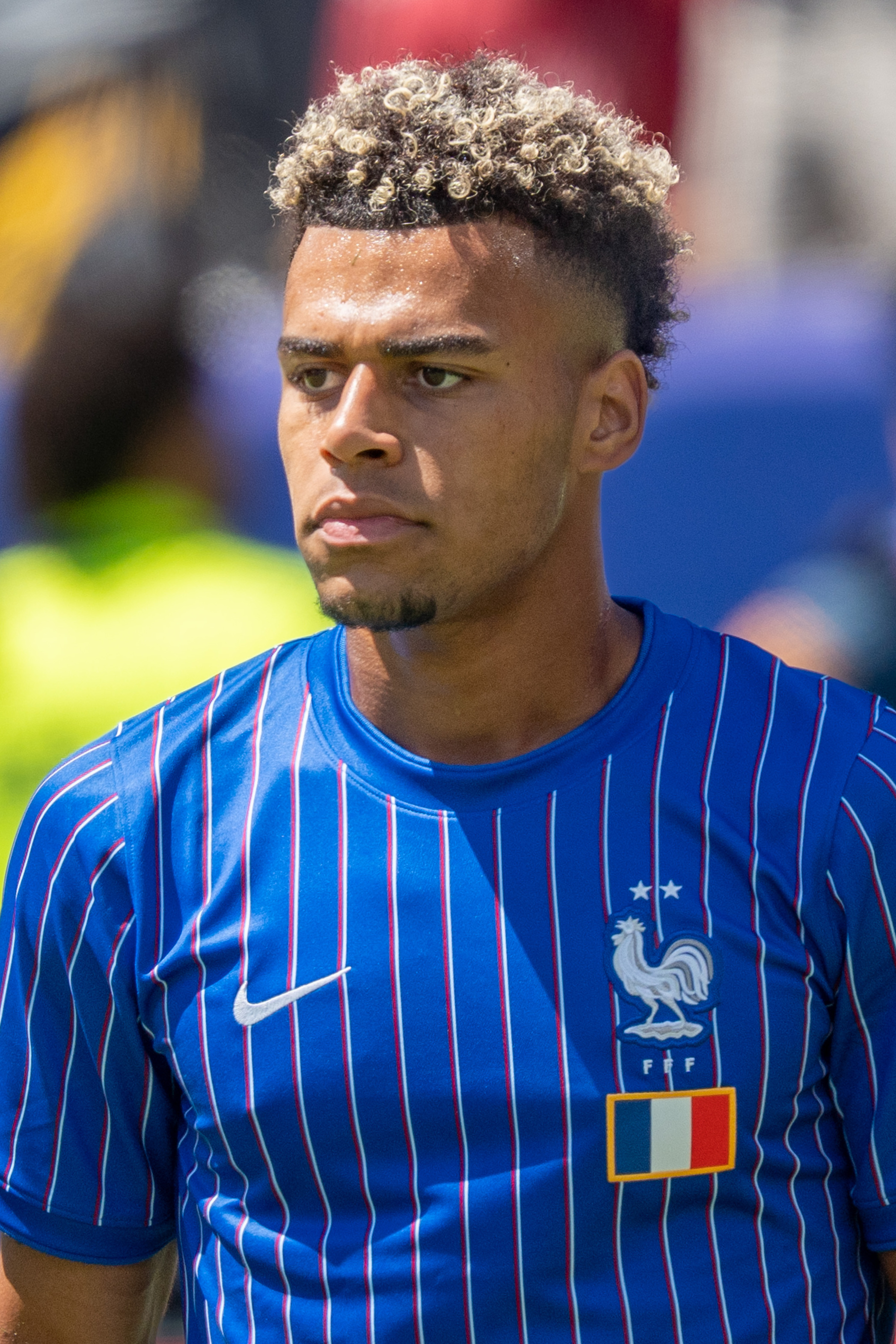
Paris Saint-Germain forward Ousmane Dembélé (left) was named the Champions League Player of the Season, while his teammate forward Désiré Doué (right) was named the Young Player of the Season.

The UEFA technical study group selected the following players as the team of the tournament.

Pos.	Player	Team
GK	(Italy) Gianluigi Donnarumma	(France) Paris Saint-Germain
DF	(Morocco) Achraf Hakimi	(France) Paris Saint-Germain
DF	(Brazil) Marquinhos	(France) Paris Saint-Germain
DF	(Italy) Alessandro Bastoni	(Italy) Inter Milan
DF	(Portugal) Nuno Mendes	(France) Paris Saint-Germain
MF	(Portugal) Vitinha	(France) Paris Saint-Germain
MF	(England) Declan Rice	(England) Arsenal
FW	(Spain) Lamine Yamal	(Spain) Barcelona
FW	(France) Désiré Doué	(France) Paris Saint-Germain
FW	(France) Ousmane Dembélé	(France) Paris Saint-Germain
FW	(Brazil) Raphinha	(Spain) Barcelona

=== Player of the Season ===
- (France) Ousmane Dembélé ( (France) Paris Saint-Germain)

=== Young Player of the Season ===
- (France) Désiré Doué ( (France) Paris Saint-Germain)

== See also ==
- 2024–25 UEFA Europa League
- 2024–25 UEFA Conference League
- 2025 UEFA Super Cup
- 2024–25 UEFA Women's Champions League
- 2024–25 UEFA Youth League
