= 2007 Trofeo Federale =

The 2007 Trofeo Federale was the 22nd edition of the Trofeo Federale, a San Marinese four-team football tournament running from September 26 to October 2, 2007. The tournament was won by La Fiorita who defeated Tre Fiori 2–1.

== Tournament bracket ==
Semi-finals
September 26
Murata	3
La Fiorita	4
September 26
Libertas	1
Tre Fiori	2

Final
October 2
La Fiorita	2
Tre Fiori	1
