= 2021–22 Campionato Sammarinese di Calcio =

San Marino football competition

Campionato Sammarinese di Calcio
- Season: 2021–22
- Dates: 18 September 2021–26 May 2022
- Champions: La Fiorita
- Champions League: La Fiorita
- Conference League: Tre Penne; Tre Fiori (via Coppa Titano)
- Matches: 232
- Goals: 567 (2.44 per match)

The 2021–22 Campionato Sammarinese di Calcio was the 37th season of league competition in San Marino, in which the country's top 15 amateur football teams competed. The season began on 18 September 2021 and ended on 26 May 2022. The winners of the league, La Fiorita qualified for a place in the 2022–23 UEFA Champions League. Runners-up, Tre Penne qualified for a place in the 2022–23 UEFA Europa Conference League.

Folgore were the defending champions after winning the title in the previous season, but failed to defend their title as Fiorentino knocked them out in the play-offs. La Fiorita won their sixth title by defeating Tre Penne in the final, 2–0.

== Participating teams ==
Because there is no promotion or relegation in the league, the same 15 teams who competed in the league the previous season competed in the league again this season.

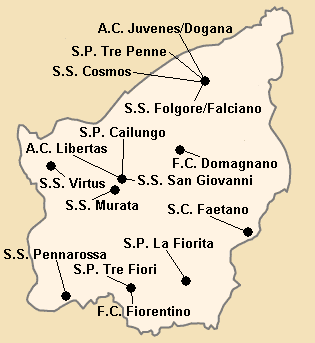
2020–21 Campionato Sammarinese di Calcio team distribution

- Cailungo (Borgo Maggiore)
- Cosmos (Serravalle)
- Domagnano (Domagnano)
- Faetano (Faetano)
- Fiorentino (Fiorentino)
- Folgore (Serravalle)
- Juvenes/Dogana (Serravalle)
- La Fiorita (Montegiardino)
- Libertas (Borgo Maggiore)
- Murata (San Marino)
- Pennarossa (Chiesanuova)
- San Giovanni (Borgo Maggiore)
- Tre Fiori (Fiorentino)
- Tre Penne (Serravalle)
- Virtus (Acquaviva)

== First phase ==
The regular season was contested by fifteen teams who played each other twice. Eight teams advanced to the second phase. The top four teams at the end of the first phase advanced to the second phase and the next eight teams played for the other four spots in the second phase.

=== League table ===
Pos	Team	Pld	W	D	L	GF	GA	GD	Pts	Qualification
1	La Fiorita	28	17	9	2	43	16	+27	60	Qualification for the second phase
2	Tre Penne	28	17	8	3	65	29	+36	59	Qualification for the second phase
3	Tre Fiori	28	14	10	4	46	28	+18	52	Qualification for the second phase and Europa Conference League first qualifying round
4	Virtus	28	15	7	6	32	18	+14	52	Qualification for the second phase
5	Pennarossa	28	12	11	5	30	22	+8	47	Qualification for the play–offs
6	Faetano	28	13	7	8	39	26	+13	46	Qualification for the play–offs
7	Libertas	28	13	5	10	48	40	+8	44	Qualification for the play–offs
8	Folgore	28	10	10	8	36	23	+13	40	Qualification for the play–offs
9	Fiorentino	28	9	9	10	43	37	+6	36	Qualification for the play–offs
10	Domagnano	28	8	6	14	28	40	−12	30	Qualification for the play–offs
11	San Giovanni	28	6	11	11	29	34	−5	29	Qualification for the play–offs
12	Murata	28	5	10	13	20	32	−12	25	Qualification for the play–offs
13	Cailungo	28	4	10	14	26	46	−20	22	
14	Juvenes/Dogana	28	5	6	17	24	63	−39	21	
15	Cosmos	28	0	5	23	9	64	−55	5	

Source: soccerway.com
Rules for classification: 1) Points; 2) Goal difference; 3) Goals scored; 4) Head-to-head points; 5) head-to-head goal difference; 6) Head-to-head goals scored.

=== Results ===
Home \ Away	CAI	COS	DOM	FAE	FTO	FOL	JUV	LFI	LIB	MUR	PEN	SGI	TFI	TPE	VIR
Cailungo		2–1	1–1	0–3	0–3	1–2	2–2	0–2	1–1	0–0	1–2	1–1	2–3	1–2	0–2
Cosmos	1–3		0–0	0–3	0–3	2–5	1–1	0–2	0–1	0–2	0–4	0–0	0–5	1–3	0–2
Domagnano	3–0	1–0		1–3	3–0	1–0	0–2	1–2	3–1	0–0	0–1	0–4	2–4	2–3	0–0
Faetano	4–1	1–0	2–1		2–0	0–1	3–1	0–0	1–2	3–2	0–1	0–1	0–1	0–0	1–2
Fiorentino	4–0	0–0	1–3	2–2		1–1	5–0	0–0	3–2	3–2	2–3	0–1	0–0	2–5	1–1
Folgore	0–1	2–0	0–1	0–0	0–0		2–1	2–0	0–3	3–0	1–1	0–0	0–0	2–4	1–2
Juvenes/Dogana	0–4	3–1	2–1	1–2	0–1	0–4		0–4	1–7	0–0	0–2	4–1	0–3	0–1	1–2
La Fiorita	2–1	2–0	2–1	0–0	0–0	1–0	2–2		5–0	1–0	1–0	1–1	2–1	1–0	0–2
Libertas	1–1	6–0	1–0	4–2	1–3	2–2	2–1	0–1		3–0	1–1	2–0	1–3	2–3	0–3
Murata	2–1	3–0	2–0	1–2	0–0	0–3	0–1	0–1	1–0		0–0	0–0	0–0	1–1	1–2
Pennarossa	1–1	2–1	1–0	0–2	2–1	1–1	0–0	0–0	1–0	1–1		1–0	1–1	1–1	0–1
San Giovanni	0–0	5–1	0–0	1–2	0–3	0–0	4–0	0–3	0–1	1–1	1–1		0–1	1–2	0–2
Tre Fiori	0–0	0–0	1–1	3–0	3–1	0–4	2–0	3–3	1–2	2–1	2–1	4–2		0–3	1–0
Tre Penne	2–1	2–0	6–0	0–0	4–3	0–0	7–1	2–3	1–1	3–0	3–0	3–3	1–1		2–0
Virtus	0–0	2–0	1–2	0–0	2–1	1–0	0–0	0–0	0–1	1–0	0–2	1–2	1–1	2–1	

Source: soccerway.com
Legend: Blue = home team win; Yellow = draw; Red = away team win.

== Second phase ==
=== Play–offs ===
The play–offs were played on 3 & 7 May 2022 between the teams finishing fifth to twelfth in the first phase. If teams are even after two legs, the team with the better first phase record will advance.

Team 1	Agg.	Team 2	1st leg	2nd leg
Pennarossa	3–2	Murata	1–1	2–1
Faetano	3–2	San Giovanni	1–1	2–1
Libertas	8–0	Domagnano	5–0	3–0
Folgore	2–3	Fiorentino	0–2	2–1

=== Quarter–finals ===
The quarter–finals were played on 11 & 15 May 2022 by the top four teams from the first phase and the four play–off winners.

Team 1	Agg.	Team 2	1st leg	2nd leg
La Fiorita	2–1	Fiorentino	0–1	2–0
Tre Penne	2–1	Libertas	2–0	0–1
Tre Fiori	2–2	Faetano	1–1	1–1
Virtus	1–2	Pennarossa	0–1	1–1

=== Semi–finals ===
The semi–finals were played on 18 & 22 May 2022 by the four quarter-finals winners.

Team 1	Agg.	Team 2	1st leg	2nd leg
Pennarossa	2–2	La Fiorita	1–2	1–0
Tre Penne	3–1	Tre Fiori	1–0	2–1

=== Third place match ===
Tre Fiori qualified to the 2022–23 UEFA Europa Conference League via winning the 2021–22 Coppa Titano, therefore this game did not act as a qualifier.

25 May 2022
20:45

Pennarossa	1–2	Tre Fiori
Tiboni 90+1'	Report	Della Valle 20'; Gjurchinoski 85'

Campo Sportivo di Acquaviva, Chiesanuova

=== Final ===
La Fiorita qualified as the winner to the 2022–23 UEFA Champions League and Tre Penne as the loser to the 2022–23 UEFA Europa Conference League.

26 May 2022
20:45

La Fiorita	2–0	Tre Penne
Rinaldi 11'; Pancotti 89'	Report

Stadio Olimpico di Serravalle, Serravalle
