= 2023–24 Campionato Sammarinese di Calcio =

San Marino football competition

Campionato Sammarinese di Calcio
- Season: 2023–24
- Dates: 15 September 2023 – 21 April 2024
- Champions: Virtus
- Champions League: Virtus
- Conference League: La Fiorita; Tre Penne
- Matches played: 120
- Goals scored: 384 (3.2 per match)
- Top goalscorer: Matteo Prandelli (14 goals)
- Biggest home win: Folgore 8–0 Pennarossa (7 January 2024)
- Biggest away win: Domagnano 1–6 La Fiorita (6 January 2024)
- Highest scoring: Folgore 8–0 Pennarossa (7 January 2024); Cosmos 7–1 Faetano (13 January 2024)
- Longest winning run: 11 matches Virtus
- Longest unbeaten run: 12 matches Tre Penne
- Longest winless run: 15 matches Pennarossa
- Longest losing run: 9 matches Pennarossa
- All statistics correct as of 14 January 2024.

The 2023–24 Campionato Sammarinese di Calcio was the 39th season of league competition in San Marino, in which the country's top 15 amateur football teams and the San Marino Academy U22 competed. The season began on 15 September 2023 and ended on 21 April 2024.

The winners (Virtus) qualified for the 2024–25 UEFA Champions League first qualifying round. The Conference League play-off winners (Tre Penne) and 2023–24 Coppa Titano winners (La Fiorita) qualified for the 2024–25 UEFA Conference League first qualifying round.

== Participating teams ==
Locations of the 2023–24 Campionato Sammarinese di Calcio teams

Club	Location
Cailungo	Cailungo
Cosmos	Serravalle
Domagnano	Domagnano
Faetano	Faetano
Fiorentino	Fiorentino
Folgore	Falciano
Juvenes/Dogana	Dogana
La Fiorita	Montegiardino
Libertas	Borgo Maggiore
Murata	Murata
Pennarossa	Chiesanuova
San Marino Academy U22	San Marino
San Giovanni	San Giovanni sotto le Penne
Tre Fiori	Fiorentino
Tre Penne	San Marino
Virtus	Acquaviva

== First phase ==
=== League table ===
Pos	Team	Pld	W	D	L	GF	GA	GD	Pts	Qualification
1	Virtus (C)	30	26	1	3	61	20	+41	79	Qualification for the Champions League first qualifying round
2	La Fiorita	30	25	2	3	71	18	+53	77	Qualification for the Conference League play-off quarter-finals and Conference League first qualifying round (Note: La Fiorita qualified for the Conference League first qualifying round by winning the 2023–24 Coppa Titano.)
3	Tre Penne (O)	30	20	3	7	76	30	+46	63	Qualification for the Conference League play-off quarter-finals
4	Cosmos	30	18	6	6	78	28	+50	60	Qualification for the Conference League play-off quarter-finals
5	Murata	30	19	2	9	56	22	+34	59	Qualification for the Conference League play-off quarter-finals
6	Tre Fiori	30	17	6	7	56	30	+26	57	Qualification for the Conference League play-off quarter-finals
7	San Giovanni	30	14	3	13	55	42	+13	45	Qualification for the Conference League play-off quarter-finals
8	Juvenes/Dogana	30	14	3	13	44	47	−3	45	Qualification for the Conference League play-off first round
9	Folgore	30	11	6	13	44	37	+7	39	Qualification for the Conference League play-off first round
10	Fiorentino	30	11	5	14	40	55	−15	38	Qualification for the Conference League play-off first round
11	Domagnano	30	9	8	13	31	42	−11	35	Qualification for the Conference League play-off first round
12	Faetano	30	8	2	20	44	79	−35	26	
13	Libertas	30	6	5	19	32	56	−24	23	
14	San Marino Academy U22	30	6	4	20	32	74	−42	22	
15	Cailungo	30	4	2	24	15	77	−62	14	
16	Pennarossa	30	2	2	26	18	96	−78	8	

Source: Flashscore
Rules for classification: 1) Points; 2) Goal difference; 3) Goals scored; 4) Head-to-head points; 5) head-to-head goal difference; 6) Head-to-head goals scored.
(C) Champions; (O) Play-off winners

=== Results ===
Home \ Away	CAI	COS	DOM	FAE	FTO	FOL	JUV	LFI	LIB	MUR	PEN	SMA	SGI	TFI	TPE	VIR
Cailungo		0–3	1–1	4–1	0–3	0–2	0–1	0–2	0–1	1–3	0–0	1–2	0–4	1–3	1–4	0–3
Cosmos	9–0		4–1	7–1	4–2	2–1	2–1	1–1	0–1	2–1	6–2	4–0	0–0	1–1	1–1	3–0
Domagnano	3–0	1–3		3–4	2–2	1–0	0–3	1–6	1–0	0–1	0–0	2–0	0–2	1–1	0–0	0–1
Faetano	2–0	0–3	0–1		0–1	4–1	0–3	1–4	1–2	0–0	2–0	3–1	1–2	3–3	1–3	2–3
Fiorentino	0–1	3–3	2–0	1–3		1–2	0–1	1–3	4–2	2–1	4–0	3–2	1–1	2–1	0–4	3–1
Folgore	3–0	0–0	1–1	4–1	2–2		1–0	1–0	1–1	0–2	8–0	1–1	2–1	0–1	0–2	0–2
Juvenes/Dogana	1–0	0–4	1–0	3–1	1–1	0–1		0–1	4–1	2–4	3–1	2–2	1–2	2–1	1–1	1–2
La Fiorita	7–0	1–0	2–0	2–1	2–0	1–0	4–0		3–1	2–1	3–0	3–1	2–1	1–0	3–2	0–1
Libertas	2–1	1–3	0–2	1–3	0–1	2–2	1–0	0–3		1–4	0–2	2–2	1–1	1–2	1–3	0–2
Murata	3–0	1–0	1–0	5–0	3–0	1–0	4–1	1–2	1–0		5–0	2–0	0–1	0–0	0–2	0–1
Pennarossa	0–2	1–5	1–2	4–3	0–1	2–4	1–2	0–3	1–4	0–3		0–1	0–3	0–3	0–5	1–4
San Marino Academy U22	0–1	0–5	1–3	2–0	2–0	0–4	1–2	0–3	1–1	0–7	4–0		0–5	1–2	1–5	0–3
San Giovanni	5–0	0–3	3–1	0–2	2–0	2–1	2–3	0–3	2–1	0–1	9–0	3–1		0–1	1–3	1–2
Tre Fiori	2–1	5–0	2–2	4–2	1–0	3–1	5–1	1–1	2–1	0–1	3–0	1–3	3–1		2–1	0–1
Tre Penne	4–0	1–0	0–2	6–1	6–0	2–1	2–3	1–2	2–1	3–0	3–2	3–1	5–0	0–3		0–1
Virtus	3–0	1–0	0–0	6–1	4–0	2–0	2–1	2–1	2–1	2–0	1–0	3–2	4–1	1–0	1–2	

Source: Flashscore
Legend: Blue = home team win; Yellow = draw; Red = away team win.

== Conference League play-off ==
Teams placed 2nd-11th qualified for the Conference League play-off, with the winners earning the second and final place in the Conference League first qualifying round.

=== Bracket ===
==== First round ====
Teams placed 8th-11th entered the first round; teams placed 2nd-7th received a bye.

Team 1	Score	Team 2
24 April 2024
Folgore (9th)	2–0	Fiorentino (10th)
Juvenes/Dogana (8th)	3–2	Domagnano (11th)

==== Quarter-finals ====
The two first round winners and teams placed 2nd-7th entered the quarter-finals, held over two legs. The first legs were held on 27 and 28 April, followed by the second legs on 30 April and 1 May.

Team 1	Agg.	Team 2	1st leg	2nd leg
Cosmos (4th)	4–2	San Giovanni (7th)	1–2	3–0
Tre Fiori (6th)	1–2	Murata (5th)	0–0	1–2
La Fiorita (2nd)	1–0	Folgore (9th)	1–0	0–0
Tre Penne (3rd)	5–4	Juvenes/Dogana (8th)	3–0	2–4

==== Semi-finals ====
The four quarter-final winners entered the semi-finals, held over two legs. The first legs were held on 4 May, followed by the second legs on 11 May.

Team 1	Agg.	Team 2	1st leg	2nd leg
La Fiorita (2nd)	2–3	Murata (5th)	1–3	1–0
Cosmos (4th)	1–1	Tre Penne (3rd)	1–1	0–0

==== Final ====
The final was held between the two semi-final winners.

18 May 2024
19:45

Murata	2–3 (a.e.t.)	Tre Penne
Echel 9'; Cecconi 118'		Badalassi 52', 104'; Pieri 120+2'

San Marino Stadium, Serravalle
Referee: Michele Beltrano

== Top scorers ==
As of 11 February 2024

Rank	Player	Club	Goals
1	(Italy) Imre Badalassi	Tre Penne	22
2	(Italy) Matteo Prandelli	Cosmos	15
3	(Italy) Alex Ambrosini	La Fiorita	14
4	(Morocco) Mohamed Ben Kacem	Cosmos	11
4	(Italy) Giacomo Cecconi	Tre Fiori	11
6	(Italy) Ivan Buonocunto	Virtus	10
7	(Italy) Gianluca Benedetti	Juvenes/Dogana	9
7	(Senegal) Abdul Niang	La Fiorita	9
7	(San Marino) Samuel Pancotti	Folgore	9
7	(Italy) Riccardo Zulli	Cosmos	9
