= 2009–10 Campionato Sammarinese di Calcio =

Campionato Sammarinese di Calcio
- Season: 2009-10
- Champions: Tre Fiori; 6th title
- UEFA Champions League: Tre Fiori
- UEFA Europa League: Tre Penne (via domestic cup); Faetano
- Matches: 164
- Goals: 459 (2.8 per match)
- Biggest home win: Tre Penne 6-0 Fiorentino
- Biggest away win: Pennarossa 0-5 Faetano
- Highest scoring: Fiorentino 4-3 Folgore/Falciano; Cosmos 4-3 San Giovanni; Virtus 3-4 Tre Penne; Libertas 4-3 Faetano; Murata 6-1 Folgore/Falciano; Domagnano 6-1 San Giovanni; Tre Penne 5-2 Cosmos

The 2009–10 Campionato Sammarinese di Calcio season was the twenty-fifth since its establishment. The season began in September 2009 and ended with the playoff final in May 2010. Tre Fiori were the defending league champions, having won their fifth Sammarinese championship the previous season.

== Participating teams ==
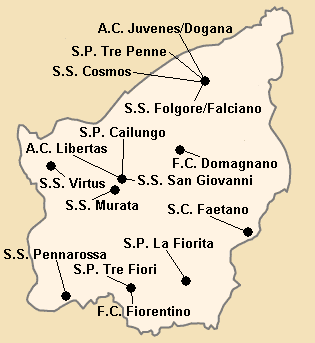
Campionato Sammarinese di Calcio 2009–10 team distribution

Because there was no promotion or relegation, the same 15 teams that competed in the previous season competed again.

- S.P. Cailungo (Borgo Maggiore)
- S.S. Cosmos (Serravalle)
- F.C. Domagnano (Domagnano)
- S.C. Faetano (Faetano)
- S.S. Folgore Falciano Calcio (Serravalle)
- F.C. Fiorentino (Fiorentino)
- A.C. Juvenes/Dogana (Serravalle)
- S.S. Pennarossa (Chiesanuova)
- S.P. La Fiorita (Montegiardino)
- A.C. Libertas (Borgo Maggiore)
- S.S. Murata (San Marino)
- S.S. San Giovanni (Borgo Maggiore)
- S.P. Tre Fiori (Fiorentino)
- S.P. Tre Penne (Serravalle)
- S.S. Virtus (Acquaviva)

== Venues ==
The teams did not have grounds of their own due to restricted space in San Marino. Each match was randomly assigned to one of the following grounds:

- Stadio Olimpico (Serravalle)
- Campo di Fiorentino (Fiorentino)
- Campo di Acquaviva (Chiesanuova)
- Campo di Dogana (Serravalle)
- Campo Fonte dell'Ovo (Domagnano)
- Campo di Serravalle "B" (Serravalle)

== Regular season ==
=== Group A ===
Pos	Team	Pld	W	D	L	GF	GA	GD	Pts	Qualification
1	Cosmos	21	11	5	5	32	24	+8	38	Qualification for the championship play–offs
2	Domagnano	21	10	7	4	32	21	+11	37	Qualification for the championship play–offs
3	Juvenes/Dogana	21	10	6	5	34	20	+14	36	Qualification for the championship play–offs
4	Murata	21	9	6	6	35	21	+14	33	
5	La Fiorita	21	8	8	5	33	30	+3	32	
6	Virtus	21	7	5	9	27	29	−2	26	
7	Cailungo	21	2	3	16	12	43	−31	9	
8	San Giovanni	21	1	5	15	18	50	−32	8	

Source: fsgc.sm (in Italian)
Rules for classification: 1) points; 2) head-to-head points; 3) head-to-head goal difference; 4) head-to-head goals scored; 5) goal difference; 6) number of goals scored.

=== Group B ===
Pos	Team	Pld	W	D	L	GF	GA	GD	Pts	Qualification
1	Tre Penne	20	15	3	2	55	22	+33	48	Qualification for the championship play–offs
2	Faetano	20	12	4	4	41	20	+21	40	Qualification for the championship play–offs
3	Tre Fiori	20	11	5	4	26	14	+12	38	Qualification for the championship play–offs
4	Pennarossa	20	9	7	4	30	25	+5	34	
5	Libertas	20	3	10	7	22	29	−7	19	
6	Fiorentino	20	4	1	15	17	45	−28	13	
7	Folgore	20	2	5	13	21	42	−21	11	

Source: fsgc.sm (in Italian)
Rules for classification: 1) points; 2) head-to-head points; 3) head-to-head goal difference; 4) head-to-head goals scored; 5) goal difference; 6) number of goals scored.

=== Results ===
All teams played twice against teams within their own group and once against teams from the other group. This meant that the clubs in the eight-club group played 21 matches each while the clubs in the seven-club group played 20 matches each during the regular season.

Home \ Away	CAI	COS	DOM	FAE	FIO	FOL	J/D	LFI	LIB	MUR	PEN	SGI	TFI	TPE	VIR
Cailungo		0–2	1–2	0–2		2–2	1–3	1–2		1–3		1–1		0–4	0–1
Cosmos	1–0		1–0	2–2			0–2	0–0	2–1	1–0		4–3	2–1		1–1
Domagnano	2–1	1–1				1–1	1–1	4–1	1–0	1–0	0–0	6–1			2–2
Faetano			3–0		4–2	2–0	0–1		2–2	0–2	1–1	1–0	1–0	3–2	
Fiorentino	1–2	0–2	1–3	0–2		4–3	1–0		1–2		0–4		0–2	0–2	
Folgore		0–3		0–0	3–0		1–4	2–4	1–0		1–2	1–1	0–1	0–1	
Juvenes/Dogana	4–0	1–0	0–1					1–1	1–2	2–2	2–2	4–1	0–0		0–2
La Fiorita	3–0	2–1	1–1	1–2	3–2		0–1			1–3	3–2	1–1		2–3	1–0
Libertas	0–0			4–3	1–1	1–1		1–2			1–1	2–2	1–3	1–1	0–3
Murata	4–0	0–1	2–1		0–2	6–1	2–2	1–1	0–0			5–0	1–1		2–1
Pennarossa	2–0	3–2		0–5	2–0	2–1			1–1	1–0			0–0	0–4	2–1
San Giovanni	0–1	1–3	1–2		0–1		0–3	3–3		0–1	0–3		0–2	0–4	3–1
Tre Fiori	2–0		0–0	3–2	2–0	3–0		0–0	1–0		2–1			1–4	1–0
Tre Penne		5–2	2–1	0–3	6–0	2–1	3–1		2–2	3–0	1–1		2–1		
Virtus	2–1	1–1	1–2	0–3	2–1	3–2	0–1	1–1		1–1		1–0		3–4	

Legend: Blue = home team win; Yellow = draw; Red = away team win.

== Play-off ==
The playoff were held in a double-elimination format. Both group winners earned byes in the first and second round.

=== First round ===
These matches took place on 3 and 4 May 2010.

Team 1	Score	Team 2
Faetano	2–0	Juvenes/Dogana
Domagnano	0–2	Tre Fiori

=== Second round ===
The matches were played on 7 and 8 May 2009. Juvenes/Dogana were eliminated.

Team 1	Score	Team 2
Faetano	0–0 (a.e.t.) (3–0 p)	Tre Fiori
Juvenes/Dogana	2–4	Domagnano

=== Third round ===
The group winners enter the playoff in this round. These matches took place on 11 and 13 May 2010. Domagnano were eliminated.

Team 1	Score	Team 2
Cosmos	0–3	Tre Penne
Domagnano	0–3	Tre Fiori

=== Fourth round ===
These matches were played on 17 and 21 May 2010. Cosmos were eliminated.

Team 1	Score	Team 2
Tre Fiori	1–0	Cosmos
Tre Penne	1–0	Faetano

=== Semifinal ===
This match took place on 25 May 2010. As the Final featured both 2009–10 Coppa Titano finalists, Faetano qualified for the first qualifying round of the 2010–11 UEFA Europa League.

Team 1	Score	Team 2
Tre Fiori	2–1	Faetano

=== Final ===
The final took place on 31 May 2010. The winner qualified for the first qualifying round of the 2010–11 UEFA Champions League, while the runner-up qualified for the second qualifying round of the 2010–11 UEFA Europa League.

31 May 2010
21:00 CET

Tre Penne	1–2	Tre Fiori

Stadio Olimpico, Serravalle
