= Mario Ferri (footballer) =

Italian footballer (born 1987)

Mario Ferri Falco (born 13 April 1987) is an Italian footballer who plays for Tre Fiori FC

== Early life ==
Ferri was born on 13 April 1987. Born in Italy, he has been nicknamed "Falco" and is a native of Pescara, Italy. Growing up, he supported Italian Serie A side Milan.

== Club career ==
In 2019, Ferri signed for Seychellois side Victoria City, where he became the first Italian footballer to score in an African top flight. Following his stint there, he signed for Indian side United SC in 2022.

During the summer of 2024, he signed for Italian side Collecorvino, helping the club win the league title. Ahead of the 2025–26 season, he signed for Sammarinese side Tre Fiori, where he played in the UEFA Champions League.

== International career ==
Ferri played for the Two Sicilies national football team.

== Personal life ==
Ferri is known for his pitch invasion activism and has a tattoo of the coat of arms of Ukraine in solidarity with the country due to the 2022 Russian invasion of Ukraine.
