= 2008 Trofeo Federale =

The 2008 Trofeo Federale was a four-team football tournament in San Marino running from 1 to 16 September 2008. The teams were 2007–08 league champions, Murata and runners-up, Juvenes/Dogana; since the 2007–08 Coppa Titano finalists were also the league finalists, the cup's semi-finalists, Tre Fiori and Faetano were used instead as the remaining two clubs.

== Tournament bracket ==
Semi-finals
September 1
Murata | 1
Tre Fiori | 0
September 1
Juvenes/Dogana | 0
Faetano | 1

Final
September 16
Murata | 4
Faetano | 2
