= 2009–10 Coppa Titano =

Football competition in San Marino

The 2009-10 Coppa Titano was the fiftieth season of San Marino's oldest football competition. It began on 12 September 2009 with the first games of the Group Stage and ended in 2010 with the Final held at Stadio Olimpico, Serravalle. Juvenes/Dogana were the defending champions, having won their eighth cup final last season.

Tre Fiori defeated Tre Penne 2–1 in extra time in the final, thereby earning at least a place in the first qualifying round of the 2010–11 UEFA Europa League. They have since been promoted to the second qualifying round because Atlético Madrid, winners of the 2009–10 Europa League, are also assured of qualifying domestically for the 2010–11 Europa League through the Copa del Rey. Tre Fiori can instead qualify for the first qualifying round of the 2010–11 UEFA Champions League by winning the 2009–10 Campionato Sammarinese di Calcio, in which they are currently in the semifinals.

== Competition format ==
The competition consists of two stages, the Group Stage and the Elimination Rounds. The Group Stage consists of three groups with five teams each. Every team plays two games (once home and once away) against every other team of its group. The top two teams from each group, as well as the two best third-placed teams, qualify for the Elimination Rounds. The Elimination Rounds are a single-game elimination tournament. Games in the Elimination Rounds are decided by extra time and, if necessary, a penalty shootout.

== Group stage ==
=== Group A ===
Pos	Team	Pld	W	D	L	GF	GA	GD	Pts	TFI	MUR	TPE	COS	CAI
1	Tre Fiori (A)	8	6	0	2	15	7	+8	18		2–0	2–3	1–0	2–0
2	Murata (A)	8	4	2	2	11	9	+2	14	0–3		1–0	4–0	0–0
3	Tre Penne (A)	8	3	3	2	16	9	+7	12	3–1	1–2		0–0	2–2
4	Cosmos	8	2	3	3	9	12	−3	9	1–3	3–3	1–1		3–0
5	Cailungo	8	0	2	6	2	16	−14	2	0–1	0–1	0–6	0–1	

Source: Classification and Results (in Italian)
Rules for classification: 1) points; 2) head-to-head points; 3) head-to-head goal difference; 4) head-to-head goals scored; 5) goal difference; 6) number of goals scored.
(A) Advanced to Quarterfinals

=== Group B ===
Pos	Team	Pld	W	D	L	GF	GA	GD	Pts	J/D	FOL	LFI	PEN	FAE
1	Juvenes/Dogana (A)	8	6	1	1	12	5	+7	19		3–1	2–1	1–0	3–1
2	Folgore (A)	8	3	2	3	8	10	−2	11 (Note: FOL 1-1 LFI; LFI 1-2 FOL)	1–0		1–1	1–1	1–0
3	La Fiorita	8	3	2	3	16	12	+4	11	0–1	1–2		4–3	5–2
4	Pennarossa	8	2	3	3	11	13	−2	9	1–1	2–0	0–3		2–1
5	Faetano	8	1	2	5	9	16	−7	5	0–1	2–1	1–1	2–2	

Source: Classification and Results (in Italian)
Rules for classification: 1) points; 2) head-to-head points; 3) head-to-head goal difference; 4) head-to-head goals scored; 5) goal difference; 6) number of goals scored.
(A) Advanced to Quarterfinals

=== Group C ===
Pos	Team	Pld	W	D	L	GF	GA	GD	Pts	LIB	DOM	VIR	FIO	SGI
1	Libertas (A)	8	4	3	1	15	7	+8	15		3–1	2–0	3–0	2–0
2	Domagnano (A)	8	4	2	2	12	8	+4	14	1–1		0–3	1–0	0–0
3	Virtus (A)	8	4	1	3	16	10	+6	13	2–1	1–2		1–2	1–1
4	Fiorentino	8	2	2	4	10	19	−9	8	3–3	0–2	2–7		2–2
5	San Giovanni	8	0	4	4	3	12	−9	4	0–0	0–5	0–1	0–1	

Source: Classification and Results (in Italian)
Rules for classification: 1) points; 2) head-to-head points; 3) head-to-head goal difference; 4) head-to-head goals scored; 5) goal difference; 6) number of goals scored.
(A) Advanced to Quarterfinals

== Elimination rounds ==
=== Quarterfinals ===
These matches were played on 21 April 2010.

Team 1	Score	Team 2
Libertas	1–3	Tre Penne
Juvenes/Dogana	1–2	Virtus
Folgore/Falciano	0–3	Murata
Tre Fiori	2–0	Domagnano

=== Semifinals ===
These matches were played on 24 April 2010.

Team 1	Score	Team 2
Tre Penne	1–0	Virtus
Murata	0–3	Tre Fiori

=== Final ===
29 April 2010
21:00 CEST

Tre Penne	1–2 (a.e.t.)	Tre Fiori
Valli 14'		Giunta 61'; Aruta 95'

Stadio Olimpico, Serravalle
