= 1997–98 Campionato Sammarinese di Calcio =

Annual soccer tournament

Campionato Sammarinese di Calcio
- Season: 1997–98
- Champions: S.S. Folgore/Falciano

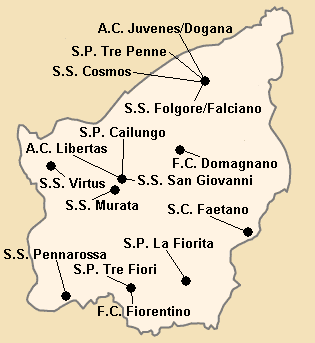
1997–98 Campionato Sammarinese di Calcio team distribution

The 1997–98 Campionato Sammarinese di Calcio season was the 13th season since its establishment. It was contested by 16 teams, and S.S. Folgore/Falciano won the championship.

== Regular season ==
=== Group A ===
Pos	Team	Pld	W	D	L	GF	GA	GD	Pts	Qualification
1	S.P. Tre Fiori	22	16	1	5	48	22	+26	49	Qualification for the championship play–offs
2	S.C. Faetano	22	11	7	4	37	13	+24	40	Qualification for the championship play–offs
3	S.S. Folgore/Falciano	22	11	7	4	24	16	+8	40	Qualification for the championship play–offs
4	S.S. Murata	22	11	4	7	55	32	+23	37	
5	S.S. San Giovanni	22	8	7	7	32	29	+3	31	
6	S.S. Juvenes	22	5	6	11	25	36	−11	21	
7	S.S. Pennarossa	22	4	7	11	31	46	−15	19	
8	S.P. Cailungo	22	2	4	16	19	54	−35	10	

Source: rsssf.com

=== Group B ===
Pos	Team	Pld	W	D	L	GF	GA	GD	Pts	Qualification
1	S.S. Virtus	22	15	3	4	52	20	+32	48	Qualification for the championship play–offs
2	S.S. Montevito	22	11	5	6	34	30	+4	38	Qualification for the championship play–offs
3	S.P. Tre Penne	22	10	7	5	41	30	+11	37	Qualification for the championship play–offs
4	S.S. Cosmos	22	9	9	4	37	24	+13	36	
5	A.C. Libertas	22	8	3	11	26	37	−11	27	
6	S.P. La Fiorita	22	6	6	10	30	37	−7	24	
7	G.S. Dogana	22	5	7	10	29	41	−12	22	
8	F.C. Domagnano	22	1	3	18	15	68	−53	6	

Source: rsssf.com

=== Results ===
All teams play twice against the teams within their own group and once against the teams from the other group.

Home \ Away	CAI	COS	DOG	DOM	FAE	FOL	JUV	LFI	LIB	MON	MUR	PEN	SGI	TFI	TPE	VIR
Cailungo		1–3			1–1	1–1	1–2		1–2		0–3	0–2	2–2	1–3	1–3	0–6
Cosmos			3–0	6–1	2–2	0–1		0–0	2–2	4–3			0–0	1–0	1–1	1–2
Dogana	2–1	2–1		0–1	0–4			0–0	1–1	1–2		2–2		1–3	4–4	0–4
Domagnano	0–1	0–1	1–5			1–1		1–4	1–3	1–2	1–4		0–3		0–3	1–3
Faetano	2–0			4–0		2–0	1–0	2–0	0–1		3–0	1–1	1–0	1–2		0–0
Folgore	2–0		0–2		2–1		0–0	0–0	1–0		2–0	2–1	2–1	1–0		0–0
Juvenes	4–1	1–2	3–0	2–0	1–1	1–1					1–3	0–0	0–0	2–3	0–4	
La Fiorita	2–2	2–0	2–4	1–1			1–0		1–3	1–3			2–3	0–2	3–1	3–6
Libertas		0–3	1–0	0–0			2–1	1–3		2–1	1–3	2–4	0–1		1–2	2–1
Montevito	1–0	0–0	6–1	7–1	0–5	1–0	1–1	2–0	0–2						1–0	0–0
Murata	6–0	2–2	1–0		3–0	0–2	7–1	2–2		4–0		1–3	1–1	1–4		
Pennarossa	2–3	1–1		4–2	0–0	0–2	1–3	0–1		1–4	1–6		2–2	0–3		
San Giovanni	3–1		1–1		0–2	0–0	1–0			2–3	4–3	3–1		2–4	2–1	1–2
Tre Fiori	2–1			7–0	0–0	4–1	2–1		3–1	1–0	0–3	4–2	1–0		0–1	
Tre Penne		2–2	2–2	5–1	0–4	1–3		3–1	2–0	1–1	1–1	1–1				2–1
Virtus		0–1	2–0	5–1			4–1	2–1	4–1	2–1	3–1	3–2		2–0	0–1	

Legend: Blue = home team win; Yellow = draw; Red = away team win.

== Championship playoffs ==
=== First round ===
- S.C. Faetano 3-4 S.P. Tre Penne
- S.S. Montevito 1-1 (pen 3-4) S.S. Folgore/Falciano

=== Second round ===
- S.P. Tre Fiori 2-1 S.S. Folgore/Falciano
- S.S. Virtus 3-5 S.P. Tre Penne

=== Third round ===
- S.S. Folgore/Falciano 1-0 S.C. Faetano
- S.S. Virtus 5-0 S.S. Montevito

=== Fourth round ===
- S.P. Tre Fiori 5-0 S.P. Tre Penne
- S.S. Folgore/Falciano 3-1 S.S. Virtus

=== Semifinal ===
- S.S. Folgore/Falciano 3-1 S.P. Tre Penne

=== Final ===
- S.P. Tre Fiori 1-2 S.S. Folgore/Falciano
