= 1999–2000 Campionato Sammarinese di Calcio =

Campionato Sammarinese di Calcio
- Season: 1999–2000
- Champions: S.S. Folgore/Falciano

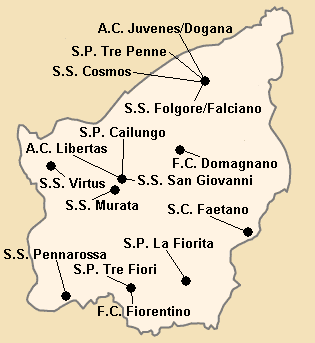
1999–2000 Campionato Sammarinese di Calcio team distribution

The 1999–2000 Campionato Sammarinese di Calcio season was the 15th season since its establishment. It was contested by 16 teams, and S.S. Folgore/Falciano won the championship.

== Regular season ==
=== Group A ===
| Pos | Team | Pld | W | D | L | GF | GA | GD | Pts | Qualification |
|---|---|---|---|---|---|---|---|---|---|---|
| 1 | S.S. Folgore/Falciano | 22 | 15 | 3 | 4 | 53 | 24 | +29 | 48 | Qualification for the championship play–offs |
| 2 | S.P. Cailungo | 22 | 14 | 4 | 4 | 40 | 21 | +19 | 46 | Qualification for the championship play–offs |
| 3 | S.S. Virtus | 22 | 13 | 5 | 4 | 47 | 24 | +23 | 44 | Qualification for the championship play–offs |
| 4 | S.S. Cosmos | 22 | 10 | 9 | 3 | 40 | 14 | +26 | 39 | |
| 5 | S.S. Pennarossa | 22 | 8 | 5 | 9 | 30 | 40 | −10 | 29 | |
| 6 | S.P. Tre Penne | 22 | 7 | 3 | 12 | 39 | 58 | −19 | 24 | |
| 7 | S.S. Juvenes | 22 | 2 | 6 | 14 | 24 | 61 | −37 | 12 | |
| 8 | S.P. La Fiorita | 22 | 2 | 4 | 16 | 17 | 50 | −33 | 10 | |

Source: rsssf.com

=== Group B ===
| Pos | Team | Pld | W | D | L | GF | GA | GD | Pts | Qualification |
|---|---|---|---|---|---|---|---|---|---|---|
| 1 | F.C. Domagnano | 22 | 12 | 6 | 4 | 59 | 27 | +32 | 42 | Qualification for the championship play–offs |
| 2 | S.P. Tre Fiori | 22 | 11 | 6 | 5 | 55 | 38 | +17 | 39 | Qualification for the championship play–offs |
| 3 | A.C. Libertas | 22 | 11 | 4 | 7 | 38 | 34 | +4 | 37 | Qualification for the championship play–offs |
| 4 | S.C. Faetano | 22 | 8 | 7 | 7 | 30 | 25 | +5 | 31 | |
| 5 | S.S. Murata | 22 | 9 | 4 | 9 | 49 | 49 | 0 | 31 | |
| 6 | G.S. Dogana | 22 | 5 | 6 | 11 | 19 | 33 | −14 | 21 | |
| 7 | S.S. Montevito | 22 | 6 | 3 | 13 | 27 | 46 | −19 | 21 | |
| 8 | S.S. San Giovanni | 22 | 3 | 5 | 14 | 21 | 44 | −23 | 14 | |

Source: rsssf.com

=== Results ===
All teams play twice against the teams within their own group and once against the teams from the other group.

| Home \ Away | CAI | COS | DOG | DOM | FAE | FOL | JUV | LFI | LIB | MON | MUR | PEN | SGI | TFI | TPE | VIR |
|---|---|---|---|---|---|---|---|---|---|---|---|---|---|---|---|---|
| Cailungo | | 1–0 | | | 1–0 | 0–1 | 3–1 | 5–0 | 2–1 | | | 1–1 | | 2–2 | 4–2 | 0–3 |
| Cosmos | 0–0 | | | | 0–0 | 4–2 | 4–0 | 4–0 | 2–0 | 0–0 | | 0–0 | | 1–2 | 4–0 | 0–2 |
| Dogana | 0–1 | 0–0 | | 0–2 | 1–1 | 1–2 | | | 1–2 | 1–0 | 1–3 | | 1–0 | 2–3 | | |
| Domagnano | 1–2 | 1–1 | 1–2 | | 3–2 | 1–4 | | 1–0 | 1–1 | 5–0 | 2–1 | 2–2 | 4–1 | 2–2 | | |
| Faetano | | | 3–1 | 1–1 | | | 3–0 | 4–0 | 1–2 | 3–1 | 0–2 | | 0–0 | 2–1 | 1–0 | 1–2 |
| Folgore | 0–1 | 0–0 | | | 3–3 | | 5–0 | 2–1 | | | 2–1 | 7–0 | 1–0 | | 7–1 | 1–0 |
| Juvenes | 0–3 | 1–1 | 3–0 | 0–8 | | 1–3 | | 2–3 | | 2–3 | 1–1 | 1–1 | | | 2–5 | 0–4 |
| La Fiorita | 1–0 | 1–6 | 1–1 | | | 2–3 | 0–2 | | 0–1 | | 2–3 | 1–2 | 0–3 | | 0–1 | 1–4 |
| Libertas | | | 0–1 | 1–1 | 2–1 | 0–1 | 3–2 | | | 1–2 | 4–3 | 2–0 | 3–1 | 3–1 | 0–2 | |
| Montevito | 0–0 | | 2–1 | 0–6 | 0–0 | 2–3 | | 1–0 | 2–3 | | 2–3 | | 0–1 | 0–2 | | 0–2 |
| Murata | 3–1 | 1–1 | 4–1 | 2–6 | 1–2 | | | | 1–1 | 3–6 | | | 3–2 | 2–3 | 1–0 | 3–3 |
| Pennarossa | 1–2 | 0–4 | 1–2 | | 0–1 | 2–1 | 2–1 | 1–0 | | 1–3 | 2–1 | | | | 3–1 | 2–2 |
| San Giovanni | 1–2 | 0–2 | 0–0 | 1–5 | 0–0 | | 2–2 | | 1–3 | 3–0 | 1–4 | 0–2 | | 2–2 | 0–2 | |
| Tre Fiori | | | 1–1 | 1–2 | 4–1 | 1–3 | 0–0 | 1–1 | 6–3 | 4–2 | 6–3 | 3–2 | 6–2 | | 3–0 | |
| Tre Penne | 2–6 | 3–5 | 3–1 | 1–3 | | 1–1 | 3–3 | 2–2 | | 2–1 | | 4–3 | | | | 2–5 |
| Virtus | 1–3 | 0–1 | 0–0 | 2–1 | | 2–1 | 4–0 | 1–1 | 2–2 | | | 1–2 | 2–0 | 2–1 | 3–2 | |

Legend: Blue = home team win; Yellow = draw; Red = away team win.

== Championship playoffs ==
=== First round ===
- S.P. Tre Fiori 3-1 S.S. Virtus
- S.P. Cailungo 3-0 A.C. Libertas

=== Second round ===
- F.C. Domagnano 0-0 (pen 5-4) S.P. Cailungo
- S.S. Folgore/Falciano 0-0 (pen 5-3) S.P. Tre Fiori

=== Third round ===
- S.P. Tre Fiori 2-1 A.C. Libertas
- S.S. Virtus 2-2 (pen 5-3) S.P. Cailungo

=== Semifinals ===
- S.S. Folgore/Falciano 3-1 F.C. Domagnano
- S.P. Tre Fiori 1-2 S.S. Virtus

=== Preliminaryfinal ===
- F.C. Domagnano 1-0 S.S. Virtus

=== Final ===
- S.S. Folgore/Falciano 3-1 F.C. Domagnano
