= Alessandro D'Addario =

Sammarinese footballer

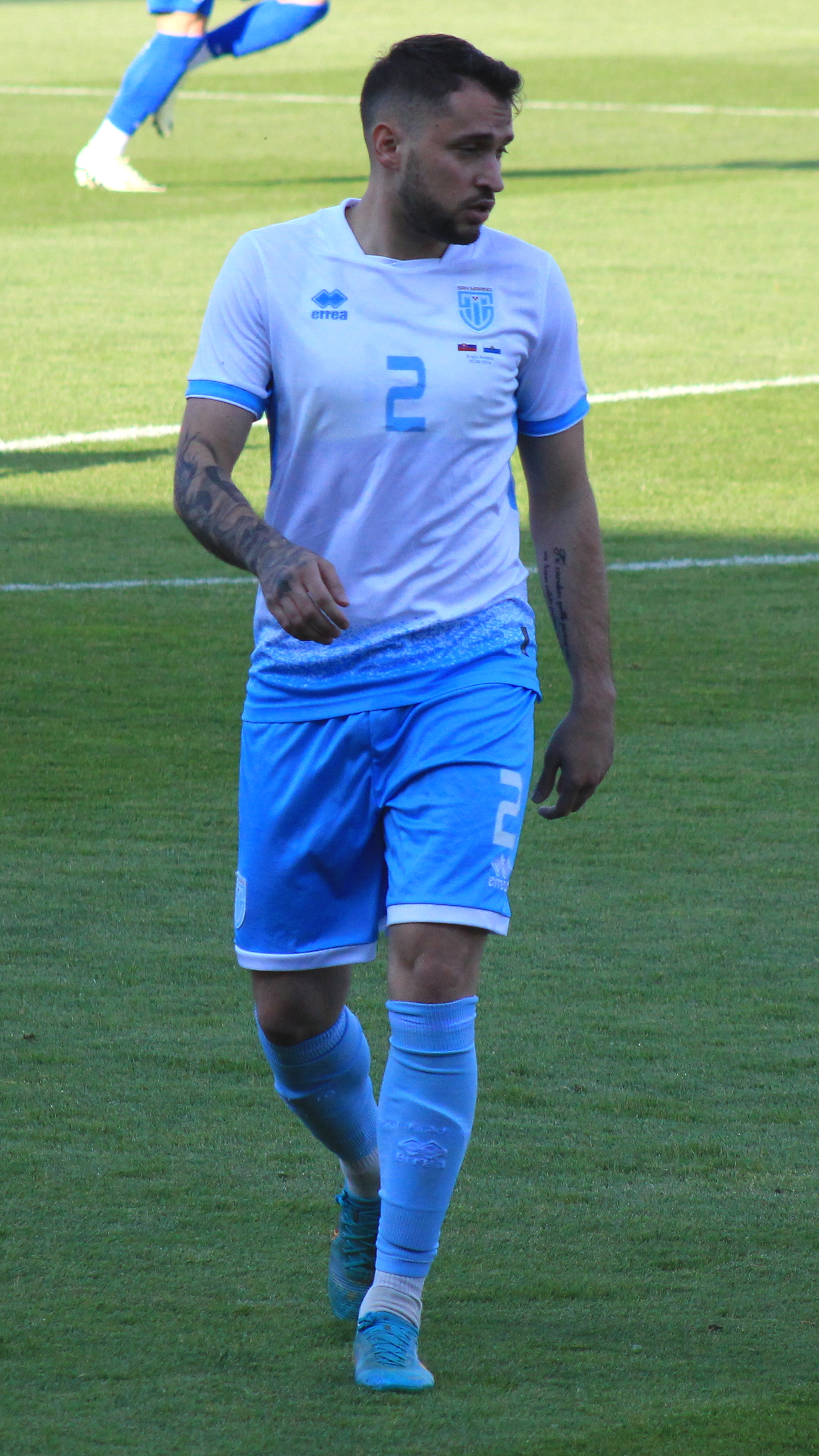
- D'Addario with San Marino against Slovakia (2024)

Personal information
- Date of birth: 9 September 1997 (age 29)
- Place of birth: San Marino, San Marino
- Height: 1.79 m (5 ft 10 in)
- Position: Right back

Team information
- Current team: Tre Penne
- Number: 2

Senior career*
Years	Team	Apps	(Gls)
2015–2017	Pianese	47	(1)
2017–2018	Rimini	10	(0)
2018–2019	San Marino	9	(0)
2019–2022	Tre Fiori	51	(3)
2022–2024	S.S. Cosmos	70	(3)
2025–	Tre Penne	49	(1)

International career^{‡}
2017–	San Marino U-19	3	(0)
2017–	San Marino U-21	17	(1)
2017–	San Marino	34	(0)
- * Club domestic league appearances and goals as of 5 June 2026 ‡ National team caps and goals as of 10 September 2024

Alessandro D'Addario (born 9 September 1997) is a Sanmarinese footballer who plays for club Tre Penne and the San Marino national football team.
