= Luca Censoni =

Sammarinese footballer

Personal information
- Full name: Luca Censoni
- Date of birth: 18 July 1996 (age 30)
- Place of birth: San Marino
- Position: Midfielder

Team information
- Current team: Tre Fiori
- Number: 8

Youth career
- 2013–2015: Rimini

Senior career*
Years	Team	Apps	(Gls)
2015–2016	San Marino Calcio		
2016–2018	Tre Penne	4	(0)
2018–2021	FYA Riccione		
2021–	Tre Fiori	114	(4)

International career^{‡}
2011–2012	San Marino U17	6	(0)
2013–2014	San Marino U19	6	(0)
2014–2018	San Marino U21	19	(0)
2019–2022	San Marino	10	(0)
- * Club domestic league appearances and goals as of 5 June 2026 ‡ National team caps and goals as of 10 June 2022

Luca Censoni (born 18 July 1996) is a Sammarinese footballer who plays as a midfielder for Tre Fiori and the San Marino national team.

== Career ==
Censoni made his international debut for San Marino on 8 June 2019 in a UEFA Euro 2020 qualifying match against Russia, which finished as a 0–9 away loss.

== Career statistics ==
=== International ===
As of 10 June 2022

San Marino
Year	Apps	Goals
2019	4	0
2020	0	0
2021	3	0
2022	3	0
Total	10	0
