= Tre Fiori FC =

Sanmarinese football club

Tre Fiori
- Full name: Società Polisportiva Tre Fiori Football Club
- Founded: 1949; 77 years ago
- Ground: Stadio di Fiorentino, Fiorentino
- Capacity: 1,000
- Chairman: Marino Casali
- Manager: Danilo Girolomoni
- League: Campionato Sammarinese di Calcio
- 2025–26: Campionato Sammarinese di Calcio, 1st of 16 (champions)
- Website: https://www.trefiori.sm
| Home colours | Away colours |

S.P. Tre Fiori Football Club, also known simply as Tre Fiori (Italian: Three Flowers), is a football section of the multi-sports club S.P. Tre Fiori, based in Fiorentino, San Marino. The club, formed in 1949, has been awarded 9 national championship titles and 8 national cup titles, making them the most successful club in the history of San Marino football. In 2018 Tre Fiori was the first team from San Marino to qualify for the next round of a UEFA competition, winning 3–1 against Bala Town F.C. on aggregate in the preliminary round of the UEFA Europa League. Tre Fiori currently hold the record for most goals scored in European competition by a Sammarinese team: eight goals. They currently play in the Campionato Sammarinese di Calcio. The club colours, reflected in their crest and kit, are yellow and blue.

S.P. Tre Fiori are currently playing in the highest Sammarinese league, Campionato Sammarinese di Calcio, where they have played the majority of the seasons during their existence. The club was most successful during the 1990s when they won three Sammarinese championships and two Trofeo Federale titles. The club first won Campionato Sammarinese di Calcio in 1988 and won their latest title in 2026. S.P. Tre Fiori have long-standing rivalries with several other clubs; the most notable of these is with neighbours F.C. Fiorentino.

== History ==
=== Early years (1985–1996) ===
Società Polisportiva Tre Fiori was founded at the castle of Fiorentino in 1949. The club first won the Campionato Sammarinese di Calcio in 1988 winning on penalties (6-5p) against S.S. Virtus in the play-off finals after a 3–3 draw. In 1989, S.P. Tre Fiori struggled to defend their title and battled against relegation from the Campionato Sammarinese di Calcio. In 1991, S.P. Tre Fiori lost the championship play-off final 1–0 to S.C. Faetano but won the Trofeo Federale that year. In 1992, after a 1–1 draw to F.C. Domagnano the club lost the national cup, Coppa Titano, on penalty shootouts (4-2p). From 1993 till 1995, Tre Fiori dominated the league by winning the championship play-off finals three times in a row. The club was most successful during the 1990s when they won three Sammarinese championships and two Trofeo Federale titles.

=== 1997–2007 ===
After the league being split into two divisions called Girone, in 1998 and 2000, Tre Fiori only succeeded twice to the play-offs losing on both the occasions. In 1998, the team was defeated 1–2 by S.S. Folgore/Falciano in the championship play-off finals and in 2000 the team were eliminated from the play-off semi-finals losing 1–2 to S.S. Virtus. In 2001, Tre Fiori were runners-up of Coppa Titano losing 1–0 to F.C. Domagnano. In the 2003–2004 season, Tre Fiori missed out on to the third position to qualify for the championship play-offs and finished fourth, three points behind S.S. Virtus. In the 2006–2007 season, Tre Fiori reached the finals of the championship play-off but lost 4–0 to S.S. Murata.

=== Success and European football (2008–present) ===
On 29 May 2009, S.P. Tre Fori defeated A.C. Juvenes/Dogana 3–1 in a penalty shootout, winning the championship play-offs and qualifying for the UEFA Champions League. On 1 July, S.P. Tre Fiori had their first experience in a UEFA Champions League fixture, contesting a first qualifying round tie against UE Sant Julià from Andorra. The home game of the two-legged tie was played at Montecchio and resulted in a 1–1 draw between the two sides. However, S.P. Tre Fiori lost (4–5) on penalties in the away leg of the competition as UE Sant Julià progressed into the second round.

On 29 April 2010, S.P. Tre Fiori won the Coppa Titano for the sixth time after coming from behind to beat S.P. Tre Penne 2–1 in the final thanks to an extra-time winner from veteran striker Sossio Aruta. On 25 May, Tre Fiori won 2–1 against S.C. Faetano in the championship play-off semi-final and will face Tre Penne in the final round of the competition. On 31 May, Tre Fiori secured their sixth championship title after winning 2–1 to Tre Penne in the championship play-off final. On 30 June, S.P. Tre Fiori contested in the first qualifying round of the UEFA Champions League tie against FK Rudar Pljevlja from Montenegro. The home game of the two-legged tie was played at Stadio Olimpico in Serravalle and resulted in a 3–0 defeat for Tre Fiori. However, S.P. Tre Fiori lost 4–1 in the away leg of the competition as FK Rudar Pljevlja qualified for the second round. On 24 November, Tre Fiori won the national super cup, Trofeo Federale, for the first time in 17 years by defeating Tre Penne 1–0 in the final.

On 11 May 2011, Tre Fiori won their seventh league title by defeating Tre Penne 1–0, with the goal scored by Alessandro Giunta, in the final of the championship playoffs thereby reaching the first qualifying round of the 2011–12 UEFA Champions League. After winning the title, manager Floriano Sperindio left the club and was replaced by player-manager Paolo Tarini. On 28 June, Tre Fiori were drawn against Valletta F.C, from Malta. In the home game of the two-legged tie of the first qualifying round of 2011–12 UEFA Champions League held at Stadio Olimpico in Serravalle Tre Fiori lost 3–0.

On 5 July 2018, Tre Fiori became the first Sammarinese club to win a European tie when they defeated Bala Town from Wales 3–1 on aggregate in the preliminary round of 2018–19 UEFA Europa League qualifying. On 13 June 2022, former San Marino National Team player and record goalscorer Andy Selva was appointed manager. On 7 July 2022, following a 1–0 win against Fola Esch, Tre Fiori became the first Sammarinese club to win a European away game. The Ultras followed up their win in Luxembourg with a 3–1 victory at home in the second leg, securing a 4–1 aggregate win and qualification to the second qualifying round for the first time in club history, where they played Faroese side B36. The Faroese side proved too strong for Tre Fiori over the two legs and won by an aggregate score of 1–0, thus bringing the European adventure to an end.

== Honours ==
League

- Campionato Sammarinese di Calcio
  - Winners (9): 1987–88, 1992–93, 1993–94, 1994–95, 2008–09, 2009–10, 2010–11, 2019–20, 2025–26
  - Runners-up (3): 1990–91, 1997–98, 2006–07

Cups

- Coppa Titano
  - Winners (8): 1966, 1971, 1974, 1975, 1985, 2009–10, 2018–19, 2021–22
  - Runners-up (4): 1986, 1992, 2001, 2020–21
- Trofeo Federale
  - Winners (4): 1991, 1993, 2010, 2011
  - Runners-up (4): 1988, 1992, 1995, 2007
- Super Coppa Sammarinese
  - Winners (3): 2019, 2022, 2026

== European record ==
| Season | Competition | Round | Club | Home | Away | Aggregate |
| 2009–10 | UEFA Champions League | 1QR | (Andorra) UE Sant Julià | 1–1 | 1–1 (a.e.t.) | 2–2 (4–5 p.) |
| 2010–11 | UEFA Champions League | 1QR | (Montenegro) FK Rudar Pljevlja | 0–3 | 1–4 | 1–7 |
| 2011–12 | UEFA Champions League | 1QR | (Malta) Valletta | 0–3 | 1–2 | 1–5 |
| 2018–19 | UEFA Europa League | PR | (Wales) Bala Town | 3–0 | 0–1 | 3–1 |
| 2018–19 | UEFA Europa League | 1QR | (Slovenia) Rudar Velenje | 0–3 | 0–7 | 0–10 |
| 2019–20 | UEFA Europa League | PR | (Faroe Islands) KÍ Klaksvík | 0–4 | 1–5 | 1–9 |
| 2020–21 | UEFA Champions League | PR | (Northern Ireland) Linfield | 0–2 | | |
| 2020–21 | UEFA Europa League | 2QR | (Latvia) Riga FC | 0–1 | | |
| 2022–23 | UEFA Europa Conference League | 1QR | (Luxembourg) Fola Esch | 3–1 | 1–0 | 4–1 |
| 2022–23 | UEFA Europa Conference League | 2QR | (Faroe Islands) B36 Tórshavn | 0–0 | 0–1 | 0–1 |
| 2025–26 | UEFA Conference League | 1QR | (Armenia) Pyunik | 1–0 | 0–5 | 1–5 |
| 2026–27 | UEFA Champions League | 1QR | (Northern Ireland) Larne | 0–1 | 1–2 | 1–3 |
| 2026–27 | UEFA Conference League | 3QR | (Kosovo) Drita | 1–4 | 0–5 | 1–9 |

== Current squad ==
As of 6 August 2026

Note: Flags indicate national team as defined under FIFA eligibility rules; some limited exceptions apply. Players may hold more than one non-FIFA nationality.

| No. | Pos. | Nation | Player |
|---|---|---|---|
| 2 | DF | SMR | Alessandro D'Addario |
| 3 | DF | SMR | Mattia Sancisi |
| 4 | MF | ITA | Brando Sami |
| 5 | DF | ITA | Simone Rea |
| 6 | DF | ITA | Tom Syku |
| 7 | FW | ITA | Federico Ciccione |
| 8 | MF | SMR | Luca Censoni |
| 9 | FW | ITA | Matteo Prandelli |
| 10 | FW | ITA | Tommaso Bernardi |
| 11 | FW | NED | Joas van Nek |
| 12 | DF | ITA | Federico Pesaresi |
| 16 | MF | SMR | Federico Dolcini |

| No. | Pos. | Nation | Player |
|---|---|---|---|
| 17 | GK | ITA | Michele Nardi |
| 18 | GK | SMR | Massimo Francioni |
| 20 | MF | ITA | Federico Benedettini |
| 22 | FW | ITA | Filippo Mancini |
| 23 | DF | ITA | Alex Sirri |
| 24 | MF | ITA | Pietro Mengucci |
| 26 | DF | SMR | Alberto Guerra |
| 27 | MF | SMR | Nicko Sensoli |
| 28 | MF | SMR | Luca Terenzi |
| 33 | GK | SMR | Michele Berardi |
| 72 | DF | ITA | Simone Giocondi |
| 77 | FW | ITA | Mario Ferri |

== Club officials ==
S.P. Tre Fiori
| Position | Name |
|---|---|
| President | Marino Casali |
| Club Secretary | Giacomo Benedettini |
| Club Treasurer | Enzo Conti |
| Sporting Director | Francesco Lo Russo |
Directors
| Directors | Amici Mauro |
| Directors | Sandro Della Valle |
| Directors | Giuseppe Ceccoli |
| Directors | Giuliano Moraccini |
| Directors | Pier Marino Canti |
| Directors | Giacomo Benedettini |
Coaching and Medical Staff
| Position | Name |
| Manager | Luca Borgagni |
| Technical Director | Giorgio Leoni |
| Fitness coach | Francesco Galli |
| Masseurs | Giacomo Mancini |

=== Managerial history ===
- (San Marino) Floriano Sperindio (2009–2011)
- (Italy) Paolo Tarini (2011–2012)
- (Albania) Altin Lisi (2016)
- (San Marino) Gori Massimo (2017)
- (Italy) Matteo Cecchetti (2017–2022)
- (San Marino) Andy Selva (2022–2024)
- (Italy) Danilo Girolomoni (2024–present)
