= Serie A2 (football) =

The Serie A2 was the second level division in the Sammarinese football league system between 1986 and 1996.

== Champions ==
- 1986–87: Domagnano
- 1987–88: Virtus
- 1988–89: Cailungo
- 1989–90: Cosmos
- 1990–91: Juvenes
- 1991–92: Tre Penne
- 1992–93: Folgore/Falciano
- 1993–94: La Fiorita
- 1994–95: San Giovanni
- 1995–96: Libertas
