= Transport in San Marino =

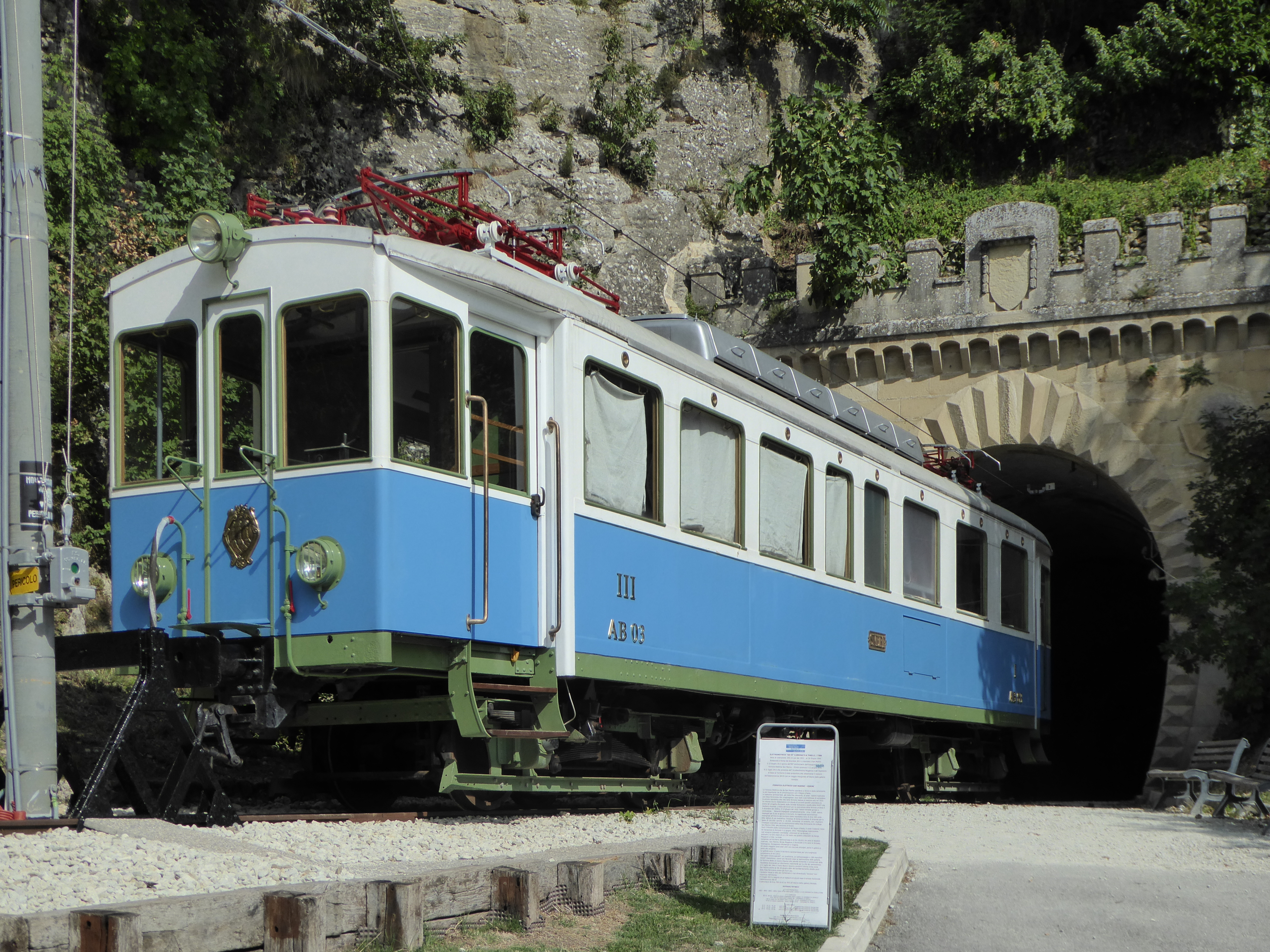
In 2012, a heritage railway, using a restored locomotive and a reactivated section of the Rimini–San Marino railway, opened in the City of San Marino.

The Republic of San Marino's public transport network consists of a local bus network and the Funivia di San Marino, an aerial cablecar system between Borgo Maggiore and the City of San Marino. Both means are operated by the Azienda Autonoma di Stato per i Servizi Pubblici, the Sammarinese state company for public transport.

Using the country's main road, the San Marino Highway, and its Italian continuation, the SS72 state road, coach companies offer several daily connections to Rimini, the closest Italian city. The country has no navigable waterways and no international airport, though it has signed several bilateral agreements with the Italian government concerning Federico Fellini International Airport, in Rimini's frazione of Miramare. A small general aviation aerodrome in the country's east, Torraccia Airfield, is owned and operated by Aeroclub San Marino, a flying club with approximately 100 members.

San Marino's railway connection to Rimini was closed and dismantled after the Second World War, and a helicopter service connecting Borgo Maggiore to Rimini and San Leo closed in 1969.

== Road ==
The main road is the San Marino Highway, a dual carriageway which runs between Borgo Maggiore and Dogana through Domagnano and Serravalle. After crossing the international border at Italy, the highway continues through Italy as the SS72 state road, touching the international border at Rovereta. It serves Cerasolo, a frazione of Coriano, and the Rimini Sud exit of the A14 tolled highway, before terminating at the crossroads with the SS16 state road.

Several taxi companies operate in San Marino.

== Aerial cablecar system ==
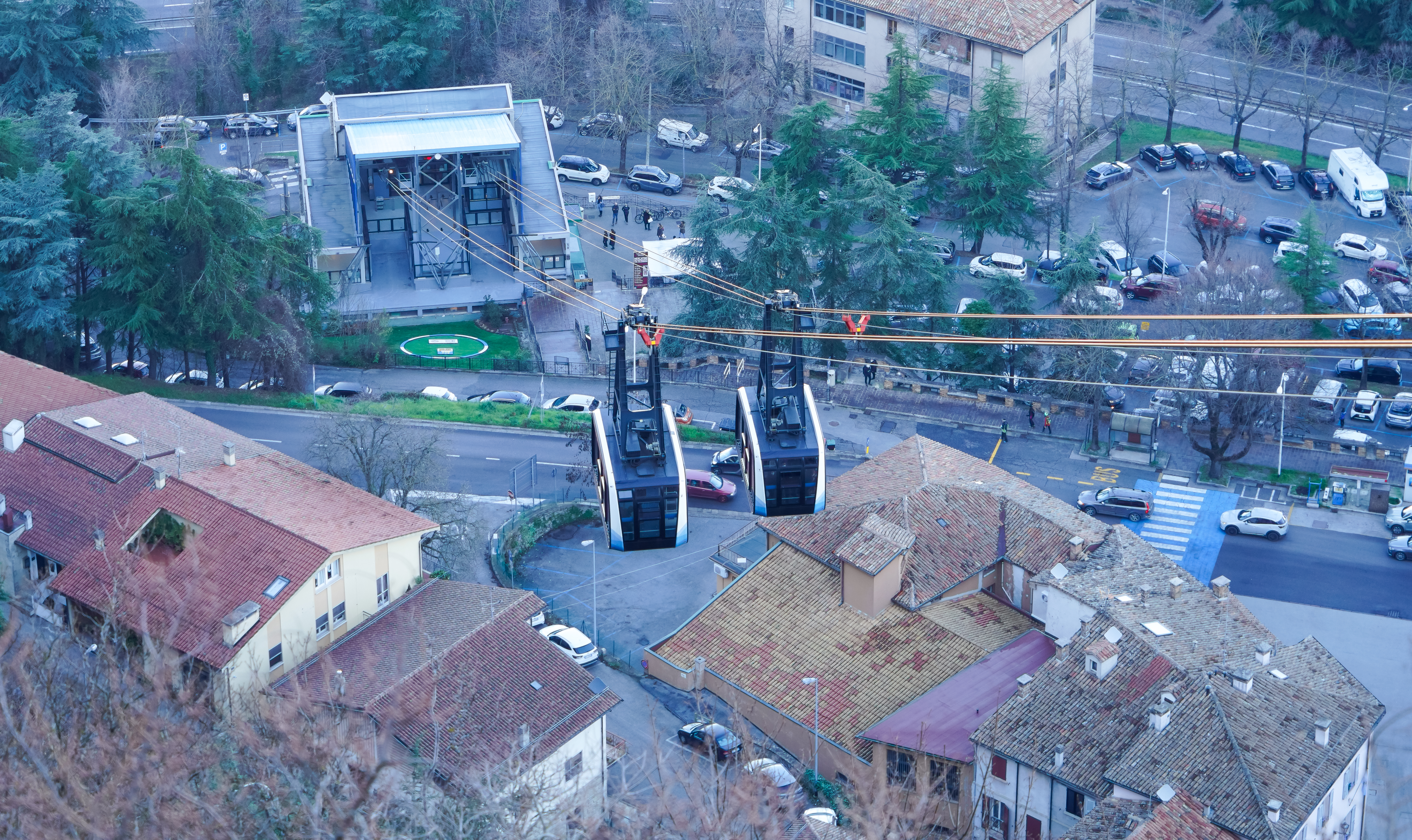
A cablecar overlooks Borgo Maggiore in April 2022.

The Funivia di San Marino is an aerial cablecar system connecting a lower terminus in Borgo Maggiore to an upper terminus in the City of San Marino. Running every fifteen minutes, the two-minute ride is renowned for its panoramic views over San Marino, the Province of Rimini, and the Adriatic Sea. The cablecar system is a major tourist attraction, and considered a defining symbol of San Marino.

The cablecar system transports 500,000 passengers yearly across approximately 21,000 trips. It was inaugurated on 1 August 1959. In 1995 and 1996, it was modernised with double load-bearing cables built by Doppelmayr Italia, and further renovated in spring 2017.

== Buses and coaches ==
As of December 2023, the Azienda Autonoma di Stato per i Servizi Pubblici, the Sammarinese state company for public transport, operates eight bus routes entirely within San Marino. All but one line start in the City of San Marino, with several lines serving Borgo Maggiore, Domagnano, Serravalle, Dogana, and San Marino Hospital.

Bus routes in San Marino
Line	Start	Via	End
1	City of San Marino	Casole, Fiorentino	Chiesanuova
2	City of San Marino	Borgo Maggiore, Ventoso, Gualducciolo	Molarini
3	City of San Marino	Borgo Maggiore, Faetano, Montegiardino, Fiorentino, Borgo Maggiore	City of San Marino
4	City of San Marino	Murata, Borgo Maggiore, Domagnano, Serravalle, Dogana, Galazzano	Strada La Ciarulla
5	City of San Marino	Santa Mustiola	Borgo Maggiore
6	City of San Marino	Valdragone, Domagnano, Torraccia	San Marino Hospital
7	City of San Marino	Murata, Borgo Maggiore, Cailungo, Serravalle, Dogana, Falciano	Rovereta
8	San Marino Hospital	Serravalle, Cà Ragni, Dogana, Falciano, Rovereta, Cinque Vie, Dogana, Lesignano, Fiorina, Serravalle	San Marino Hospital

START Romagna SpA operates several routes near San Marino's borders, but not within Sammarinese territory:

- Route 7 terminates near the border at Rovereta, and runs to Rimini's port via the SS72 state road, Cerasolo, a frazione of Coriano, and Rimini's city centre.
- Route 16 runs between the border at Dogana and the village of Santa Cristina.
- Route 160 serves Torello, across the border from Gualdicciolo, and runs between Rimini (through Verucchio) and Novafeltria.

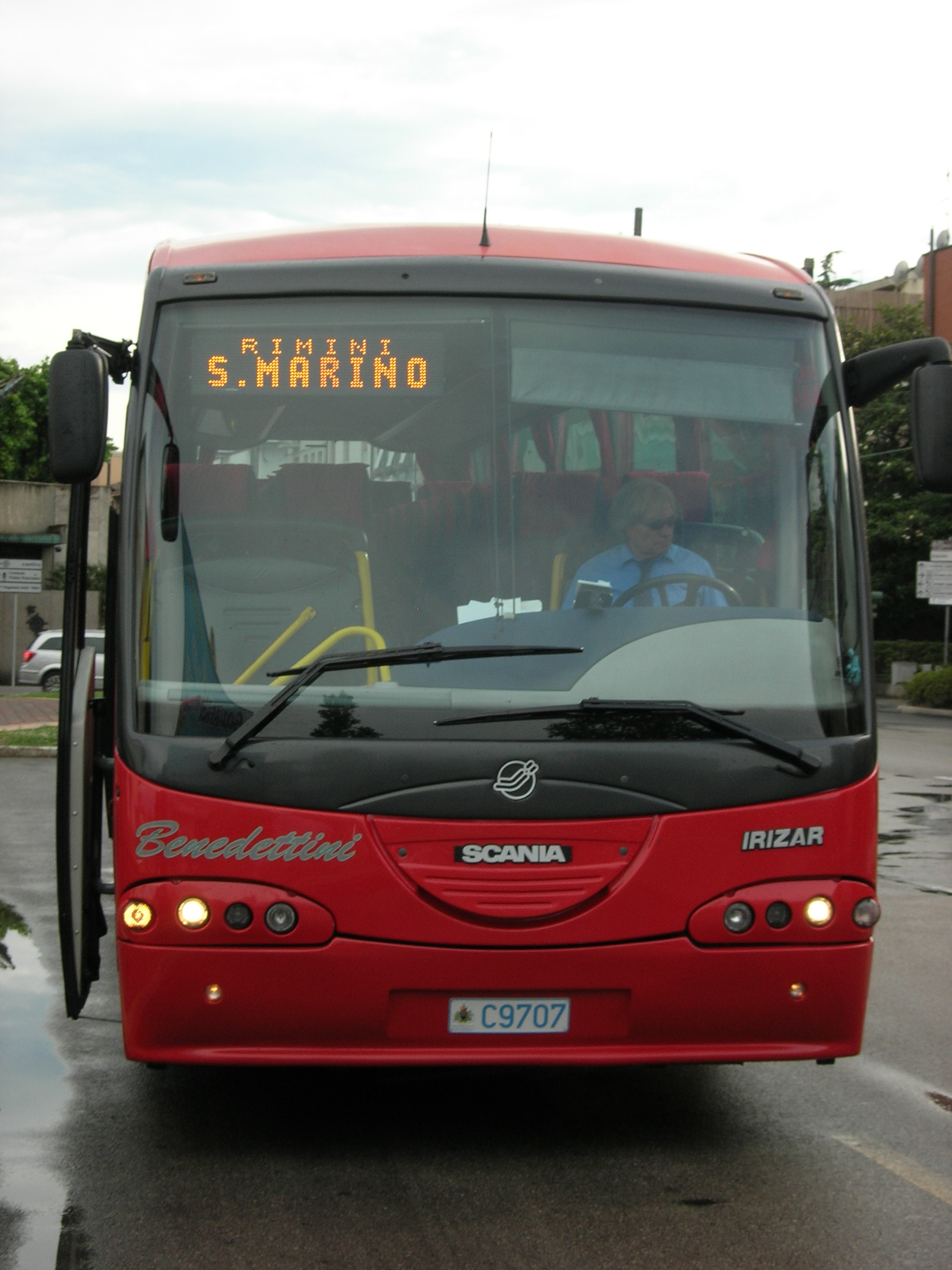
Sammarinese international bus service link with Rimini, Italy

Rimini and San Marino are connected by the coach companies Bonelli and Benedettini, which provide several services per day throughout the year. In the City of San Marino, the coaches depart from the central bus stop in Piazzale Marino Calcigni, then stop in Borgo Maggiore, Domagnano, Serravalle, Dogana, and Cerasolo, before reaching Rimini's Arch of Augustus and railway station. The coaches complete the route in approximately fifty minutes.

== Aviation ==
=== International airports ===
San Marino has no international airport on its territory. The closest international airport to San Marino is Federico Fellini International Airport, in Rimini's frazione of Miramare; other airports near San Marino are Luigi Ridolfi Airport in Forlì, Raffaello Sanzio Airport in Ancona, and Guglielmo Marconi Airport in Bologna.

San Marino first expressed an interest in entering the management of Fellini Airport in the early 1980s. Since then, the governments of San Marino and Italy have signed several bilateral agreements concerning San Marino's access to the airport. As a result of these accords, all air carriers recognised by San Marino have been able to fly to Fellini Airport, the Sammarinese government has been able to decide commercial routes, Sammarinese companies have been able to operate in Italian airports without restrictions, and the Sammarinese government has been able to carry out customs operations at Fellini Airport in agreement with the Italian authorities.

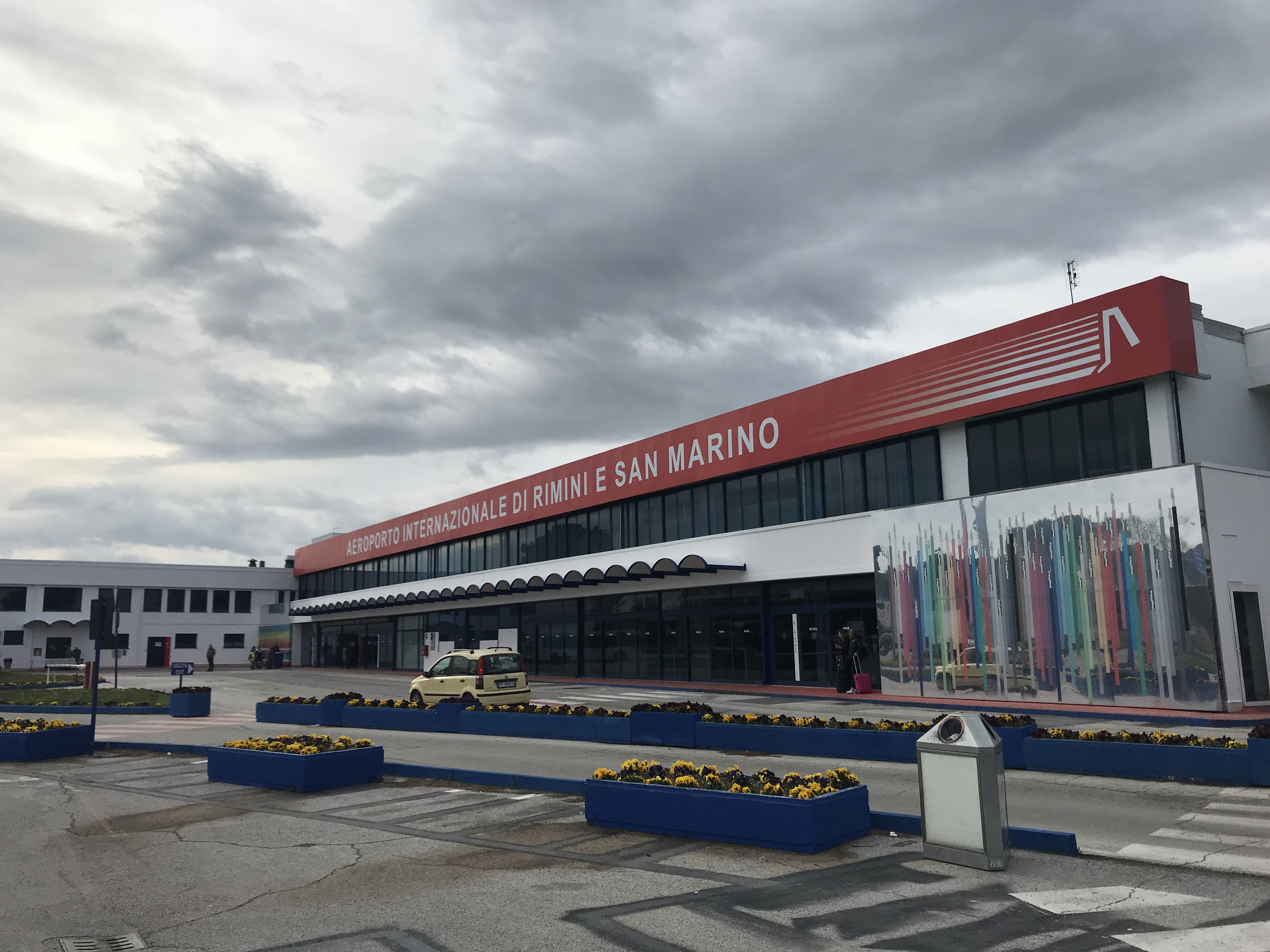
The terminal of Fellini Airport in March 2018, since its repainting

In 2002, the Sammarinese government acquired a 3% stake in Fellini Airport's management company, Aeradria. The airport was officially named Rimini-San Marino Airport. In June 2018, the subsequent management company, Airiminum, repainted the terminal sign to read Aeroporto Internazionale di Rimini e San Marino (Rimini and San Marino International Airport), replacing the previous Aeroporto Internazionale Federico Fellini (Federico Fellini International Airport).

The most significant agreement, ratified on 16 September 2013, provided San Marino a forty-year concession over some areas of Fellini Airport. The areas were expected to host a private terminal, with a customs border allowing goods destined for San Marino not to pass through Italian customs. As of August 2023, Sammarinese authorities still have no presence at the airport.

=== Torraccia Airfield ===
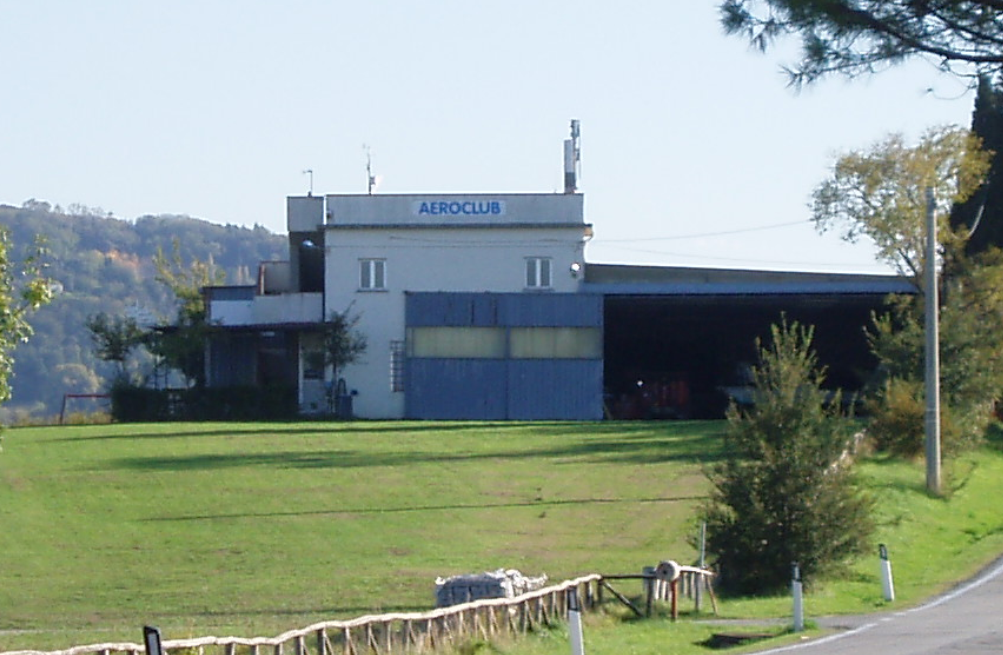
Torraccia Airfield in November 2006

Torraccia Airfield is San Marino's only aviation facility on its territory. It is a small general aviation aerodrome in Torraccia, a village east of the castello of Domagnano, less than 200 metres (660 feet) from the Italian border. Torraccia's only grass runway was first used in 1981, but the airfield's structure was opened in 1985. In July 2012, the runway was extended to 650 metres (2,130 feet).

The airfield is owned and operated by Aeroclub San Marino, a flying club with approximately 100 members. In the summer, between ten and fifteen planes typically land at the airfield per day. The airfield hosts a flight school, recreational flights and sports, and some tourist flights in small aircraft.

=== Borgo Maggiore heliport ===
On 3 September 1950, a heliport next to Borgo Maggiore's cablecar terminus inaugurated its maiden postal flight from Trieste, followed by a second postal flight to Riccione for the International Stamp Fair the following day. On 16 October 1958, the heliport welcomed a helicopter bringing the polio vaccine from Aviano Air Base.

On 24 July 1959, a statue of Our Lady of Fátima was flown to Borgo Maggiore aboard a helicopter from Forlì; the statue was used for the aerial cablecar's maiden journey. On 30 June 1959, a helicopter line running between the Borgo Maggiore heliport and a heliport by Rimini's port was inaugurated. Operated by Compagnia Italiana Elicotteri, the service ran several times per day, using a fleet of four-seater Bell 47J Rangers and a three-seater Agusta-Bell AB-47G, which were serviced at Rimini's airport. In 1964, the line was extended to San Leo. Tickets would cost up to 12,500 lire, including the cablecar to the City of San Marino and a shuttle to the Leonine fortress. The service would take fifteen minutes to reach Rimini and ten minutes to reach San Leo. The service closed in 1969, and the heliport has been replaced by a parking lot.

== Railway ==
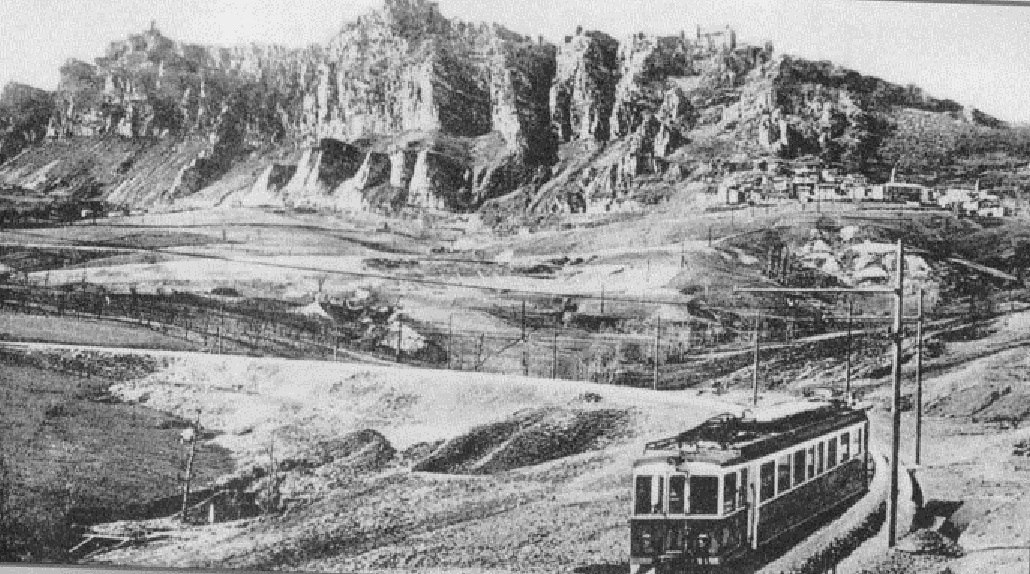
A train passes Valdragone, looking towards Monte Titano.

Between 1932 and 1944, a 31.5-kilometre (19.6-mile) electrified narrow gauge railway operated between Rimini and the City of San Marino, serving Dogana, Serravalle, Domagnano, and Borgo Maggiore along its route. During the Second World War, the line was bombed and closed, after which its tunnels sheltered refugees during the Battles of Rimini and San Marino. After the war, the railway was abandoned in favour of the San Marino Highway and Funivia di San Marino.

Despite its short operational history, the Rimini–San Marino railway retains an important place in Sammarinese culture and history, and has featured on Sammarinese postal stamps. Both the Sammarinese and Italian governments have expressed interest in reopening the line.

Between 1921 and 1960, San Marino was also served by a station on the Rimini–Novafeltria railway in Torello, on the other side of the international border from Gualdicciolo in San Marino's west. This provided San Marino its first railway station, albeit located in Italian territory.

In 2012, an 800-metre (1/2-mile) section was reopened as a heritage railway in the City of San Marino, running between Piazzale della Stazione and near Via Napoleone. The restored section comprises the original railway's final horseshoe turn through the 502-metre (1,647-foot) Montale tunnel.
