= Education in San Marino =

Segreteria di Stato per l'Istruzione e la Cultura
- Segreterio di Stato per l'Istruzione e la Cultura: Andrea Belluzzi

General details
- Primary languages: Italian
- System type: public

Literacy (2018)
- Total: 99.9%
- Male: 99.9%
- Female: 99.9%

Education in San Marino is compulsory from 6 to 16 years of age, and is divided into six stages: nursery school (nidi d'infanzia), kindergarten (scuola dell'infanzia), primary school (scuola primaria or scuola elementare), lower secondary school (scuola secondaria di primo grado or scuola media inferiore), upper secondary school (scuola secondaria di secondo grado or scuola media superiore) and university (università). Education is free in San Marino and free education is available to Sammarinesi citizens, to children of all nationalities who are permanently residents in San Marino or have a residence permit. The education system in San Marino is based on the Italian system and since 1983 the diplomas are recognised by Italy. The literacy rate is 99.9%.

== List of schools ==
=== Nursery and Kindergarten ===
In San Marino, there are 7 nursery schools:

- Nido Aquilone – Falciano
- Nido Arcobaleno – Dogana
- Nido Bruco Verde – Acquaviva
- Nido Coccinella – Città di San Marino
- Nido Mongolfiera – Dogana
- Nido Peter Pan – Cailungo
- Nido Pollicino – Cailungo

and 14 kindergartens:

- Plesso Arcobaleno – Cailungo
- Plesso Balena Azzurra – Cà Ragni
- Plesso Biancospino – Borgo Maggiore
- Plesso Drago Magico – Dogana
- Plesso Giardino – Murata
- Plesso Girasoli – Falciano
- Plesso Grillo Parlante – Montegiardino
- Plesso Il castello – Serravalle
- Plesso Girotondo – Acquaviva
- Plesso Margherita – Città di San Marino
- Plesso Scrigno – Domagnano
- Plesso Il Sentiero – Chiesanuova
- Plesso Tappeto Volante – Faetano
- Plesso Vecchio Pozzo – Fiorentino

=== Primary schools ===
In San Marino, there are 13 elementary schools:

- Plesso Arcobaleno – Cailungo
- Plesso Faro Bianco – Acquaviva
- Plesso Il Giardino dei Ciliegi – Chiesanuova
- Plesso Il Mulino – Faetano
- Plesso Il Nostro Mondo – Fiorentino
- Plesso Il Torrente – Dogana
- Plesso La Ginestra – Cà Ragni
- Plesso La Primavera – Serravalle
- Plesso La Quercia – Murata
- Plesso La Sorgente – Città di San Marino
- Plesso L'Olivo – Falciano
- Plesso L'Olmo – Montegiardino
- Plesso Scuolapiù – Domagnano

=== Middle schools ===
In San Marino, there's been a unified middle school since 2013 divided in two campuses, one in Fonte dell'Ovo, opened in 1963 and one in Serravalle, opened in 1982.

=== High schools ===
There is only one high school in San Marino, located in Città di San Marino and opened in 1883. The school is subdivided in Liceo Classico, Liceo Scientifico, Liceo Linguistico, Liceo Economico and Istituto Tecnico.

=== Centro Formazione Professionale ===
In San Marino, there is also a Centro Formazione Professionale (professional formation center) which offers three years long courses on industry, handicraft, services, services to the person and catering.
