= Rimini–San Marino railway =

Former railway line between Rimini and San Marino

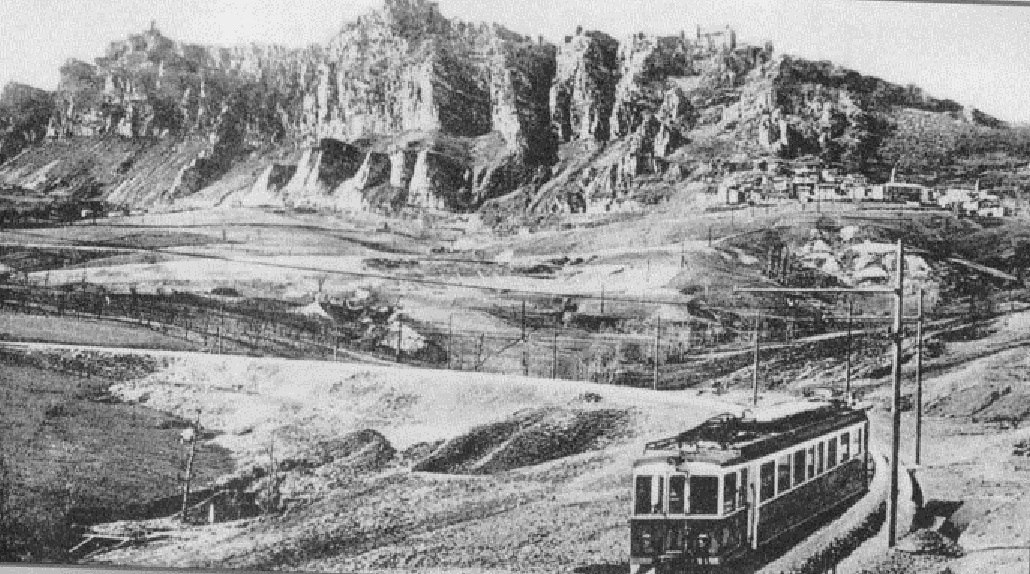
- A train at Valdragone looking towards Monte Titano

Overview
- Native name: Ferrovia Rimini–San Marino
- Status: Partially operational as heritage railway
- Locale: Province of Forlì (Rimini and Coriano); Republic of San Marino
- Termini: Rimini; City of San Marino
- Stations: 10

Service
- Type: Heavy rail
- Operator: Società Veneto-Emiliana di Ferrovie e Tramvie
- Depot: Rimini Marina
- Rolling stock: Carminati & Toselli 1931

History
- Opened: 13 June 1932
- Closed: 23 November 1943 (Rimini–Rimini Colonnella); 26 June 1944 (Domagnano–San Marino); 11 July 1944 (Rimini Colonnella–Domagnano)
- Reopened: 21 July 2012 (as heritage railway)

Technical
- Line length: 31.4 km (19.5 mi)
- Number of tracks: 1
- Track gauge: 950 mm (3 ft 1 3/8 in)
- Electrification: 3,000 V DC
- Operating speed: 36 km/h (22 mph)
- Highest elevation: 642.8 m (2,109 ft)

The Rimini–San Marino railway was a 31.5-kilometre (19.6-mile) electrified narrow-gauge railway that connected Rimini, Italy, with the City of San Marino, Republic of San Marino.

The line was operational for twelve years between 1932 and 1944. A significant engineering feat of its time, it included seventeen tunnels, three bridges, and three viaducts to negotiate the steep terrain. During the Second World War, the line was bombed and closed, after which its tunnels sheltered refugees during the Battles of Rimini and San Marino. After the war, the railway was abandoned in favour of the SS72 state road, San Marino Highway, and Funivia di San Marino.

In 2012, an 800-metre (1/2-mile) section was reopened as a heritage railway in San Marino, running between Piazzale della Stazione and near Via Napoleone. The restored section comprises the original railway's final horseshoe turn through the 502-metre (1,647-foot) Montale tunnel.

Despite its short operational history, the Rimini–San Marino railway retains an important place in Sammarinese culture and history, and has featured on Sammarinese postal stamps. Both the Sammarinese and Italian governments have expressed interest in reopening the line.

== History ==
=== Background ===
In the early 20th century, San Marino was poorly connected to Romagna and the surrounding Italian countryside. The journey to Rimini, the nearest Italian city on the Adriatic coast, would take three hours by horse, and up to five hours by mule or ox in the winter. From 1913, an intercity bus connected Rimini with the City of San Marino in just over an hour.

In 1905, during planning for a railway line along the Marecchia valley to transport sulphur from the mines in Perticara, a hamlet near Novafeltria, to Rimini's port, San Marino indicated it would pay 50,000 lire for a station on Italian territory near its western border. Thus, in 1921, the Rimini–Novafeltria railway was extended from Verucchio to Torello, on the other side of the international border from Gualdicciolo in San Marino's north west corner. This provided San Marino with its first railway station, albeit located in Italian territory.

In 1922, under the commission of the Sammarinese government, the engineer Alberto Quartara presented plans for a railway line between Rimini and the City of San Marino. In August 1926, after an impromptu visit to San Marino while on holiday in Riccione, Benito Mussolini, Italy's dictator, suggested that a railway line could run from Rimini to Serravalle. He was persuaded by Giuliano Gozi, San Marino's de facto leader, that the line could run into the city, providing the final impetus for the railway's construction.

=== Construction ===
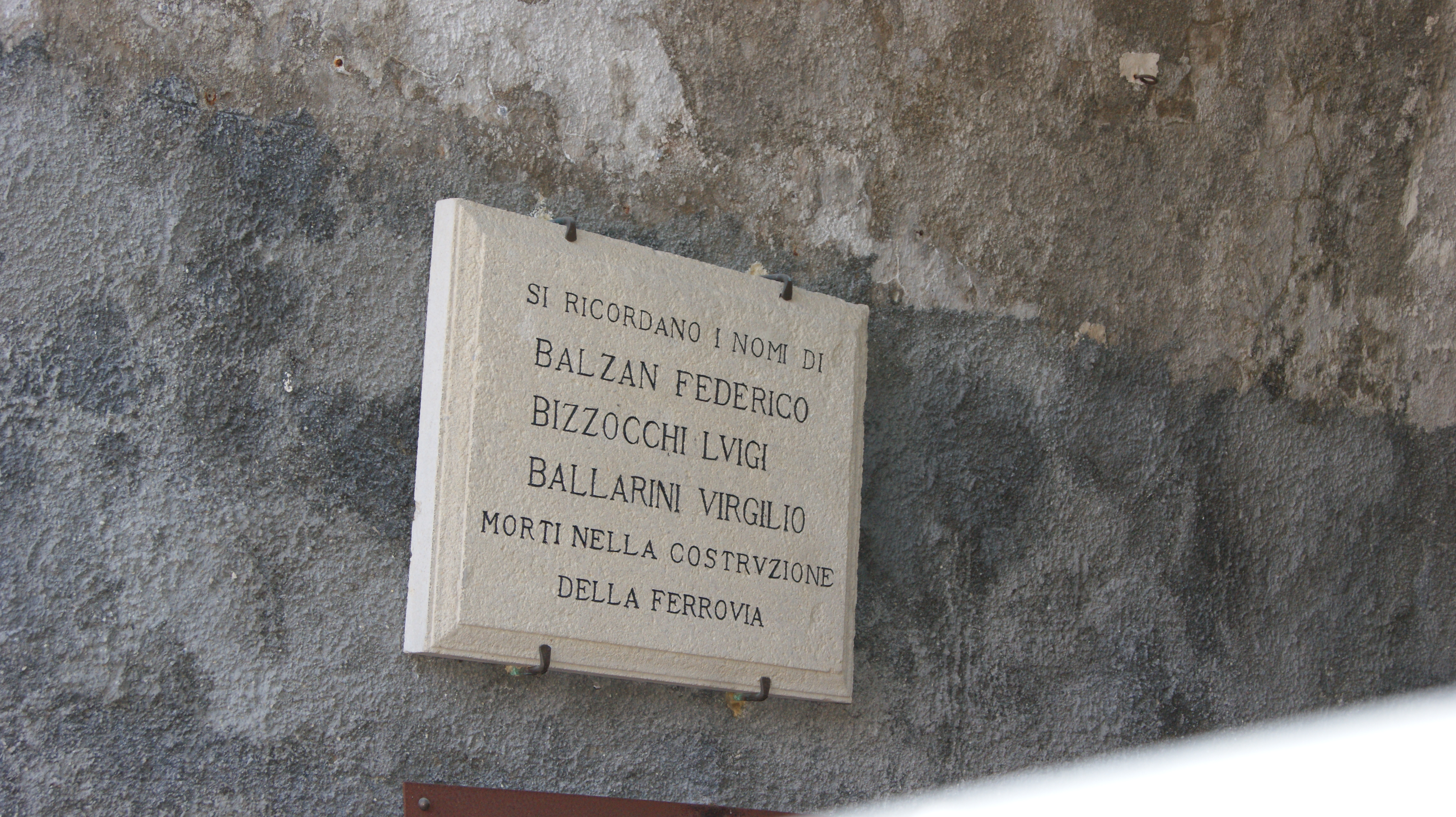
A plaque in the Montale tunnel commemorates three miners who died during its construction, August 2017.

On 26 March 1927, the governments of Italy and San Marino signed an agreement to build a railway between the City of San Marino and Rimini. Following the conclusion of the tendering process, on 23 November 1928, its construction and operation were entrusted to the Società Veneto-Emiliana di Ferrovie e Tramvie (SVEFT), whose contract was worth 38 million lire. The railway line was designed by Filippo Tajani of the Polytechnic University of Milan.

The cost of the project was borne entirely by the Italian state, which would exclusively own the entire line for twenty-five years, after which the Sammarinese government would acquire ownership of its section. In return for building the railway, San Marino allowed the Italian government the exclusive right to install and operate a radio station on its territory for ten years. Mussolini had feared that a foreign power could install a radio station in San Marino to propagate anti-fascist propaganda.

The first stone of San Marino's railway station was laid on 3 December 1928. The project required 3,000 workers, who worked eight hours a day in three shifts of 1,000 men. Operations were managed from the elementary school in Borgo Maggiore, which housed offices and dormitories. 30 tons of dynamite and 20,000 tons of cement were used to build the railway. The section to Borgo Maggiore was completed first, followed by the section to the international border, and finally the section to Rimini. Three miners died during the construction of the Montale tunnel.

=== Opening and operation ===
The opening ceremony on 12 June 1932

The Rimini–San Marino railway was inaugurated at Dogana's railway station on 12 June 1932 by Constanzo Ciano, Italy's Minister for Communications. Services began the following day. At its peak, the railway line employed 24 workers. It was popular among tourists. As well as transporting passengers, the line transported salt, tobacco, and Sammarinese lire that were minted in Rome.

With the outbreak of the Second World War, during which San Marino remained neutral while Italy fought for the Axis powers, the trains were fitted with covers to dim their headlights and internal lamps. Because fuel shortages and the requisition of private vehicles reduced the availability of private travel, the railway remained popular among Rimini's residents, who could use the line to evade food rations by importing into Italy food that they exported to San Marino. As the war continued, carriages on the line were requisitioned, and the service was temporarily reduced to two trains per day to save energy. In the winter of 1942, heavy snowfall stopped the service for a week.

=== Bombing and closure ===
The railway line in Rimini's city centre was damaged by Allied aerial bombardment on 26 and 27 November 1943. Two bombs that struck the Rimini Marina depot did not detonate. From then, the route was shortened to a flagman's booth by the Via Flaminia, which was reclassified as a stop.

On 26 June 1944, the railway was damaged by the Allied bombing of San Marino between Domagnano and Valdragone. Trains continued to run regular services between Domagnano and Rimini Colonnella until 4 July 1944. On 11 July 1944, the final locomotive and carriages were sheltered in the Cà Vir tunnel to save them from further bombings.

Even before the railway's closure, the tunnels had become shelters for refugees from Italy, with mezzanines installed to increase their capacity. An official report noted the poor breathability in an 850-metre (0.53-mile) section in Valdragone, in which 3,000 refugees sheltered. Two children died in a stampede at a tunnel in Serravalle on 6 September 1944. Meanwhile, the trains were used as hospitals, including during an outbreak of typhus in autumn 1944, after San Marino's liberation.

After the war, amid uncertainty about whether the line would be rebuilt, the railway line and rolling stock were expropriated by local residents. In 1948, the post-war Italian government declared that it was not obliged to rebuild the line as a result of the fascist regime's agreements. It was ultimately decided to replace the railway line with the SS72 state road and San Marino Highway. The Italian section was completely dismantled between 1958 and 1960. Much of the route between Rimini and Cerasolo was either turned into local roads or returned to farmland. In San Marino, the embankment between Serravalle and Domagnano was renovated into a pedestrian path through a public park, Parco Laiala.

Despite the railway's closure, it has never been officially decommissioned: a 1953 bilateral agreement between the Italian and Sammarinese governments describes the railway as "suspended" by the Second World War.

=== Partial restoration ===
White-Blue Train

Treno Bianco-Azzurro
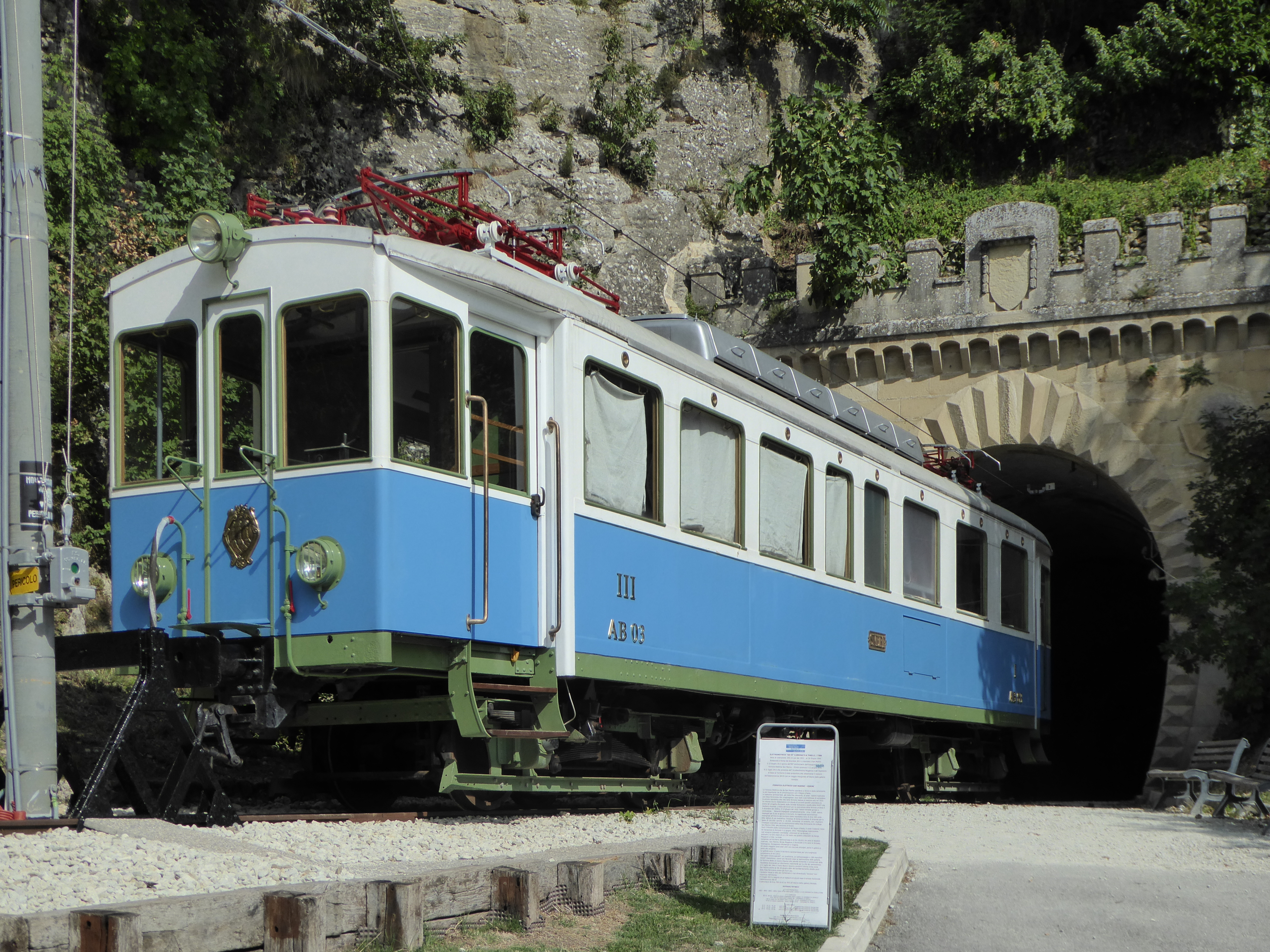
- The restored AB-03 electric railcar in front of the Montale tunnel, September 2015
- Locale: City of San Marino

Commercial operations
- Name: Rimini–San Marino railway
- Built by: Società Veneto-Emiliana di Ferrovie e Tramvie
- Original gauge: 950 mm (3 ft 1 3/8 in)
- Original electrification: 3,000 V DC

Preserved operations
- Operated by: Associazione Treno Bianco Azzurro
- Stations: 1
- Length: 800 m (0.50 mi)
- Preserved gauge: 950 mm (3 ft 1 3/8 in)
- Preserved electrification: 480 V DC

Commercial history
- Opened: 13 June 1932
- Closed: 11 July 1944
- 2012: Re-opened in the Montale tunnel

On 10 June 2011, the Associazione Treno Bianco Azzurro (White-Blue Train Association) was founded to conserve the history of the railway line and promote its reopening. Two days earlier, two convoys were extracted from inside the Montale tunnel after 68 years.

In 2012, an 800-metre (1/2-mile) section of the railway was restored in the City of San Marino, running from near the old station at Piazzale della Stazione to near Via Napoleone. An original Carminati & Toselli AB-03 electric railcar, which was preserved in the Montale tunnel, was taken to Rome, where it was restored and refurbished. The first tourist heritage railway ran on the restored section on 21 July 2012. The railway opens for scheduled visits and rides during holiday seasons.

=== Future development ===
The government of San Marino supports restoring the line between the City of San Marino and Borgo Maggiore. In December 2022, Federico Pedini Amati, San Marino's Secretary of State for Tourism, reiterated that restoring the line between Borgo Maggiore and San Marino was a "political obligation". By September 2023, the Sammarinese government had authorised extending the restored section into Piazzale della Stazione.

In June 2012, Stefano Vitali, President of the province of Rimini, suggested that the line could be restored using buses or trams, similar to the Trasporto Rapido Costiero. He hypothesised that it could cost up to 40 million euros. Vitali said that the reopening of the transport corridor could provide benefits to regional tourism while relieving congestion and improving road safety along the San Marino Highway, which Vitali noted was among the most dangerous in Italy. In November 2020, Rimini's municipal government suggested that the line could be restored as a cycle corridor to San Marino, especially the section that is more easily recoverable past Via Coriano on Rimini's outskirts.

On 2 September 2022, Amati and Massimo Garavaglia, Italy's Minister of Tourism, announced that their governments had begun preliminary processes to reopen the line in its entirety. It was envisaged that the first phase would reactivate the Sammarinese section, followed by the section to Cerasolo, and finally the section to Rimini. In November 2022, Italy's Ministry of Tourism made 2 million euros available for the feasibility study.

== Route ==
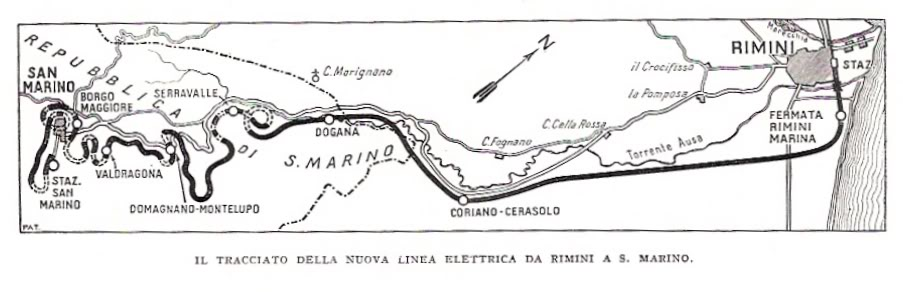
The route map from a SVEFT publication in 1926

The railway began at platform 1, east of Rimini's railway station. It continued adjacent to the Bologna–Ancona railway until Rimini Marina station, on Via Giovanni Pascoli, where the line curved west. At the time of its operation, the railway crossed the Torrente Ausa for the first time just south of Rimini's railway station: the Ausa was only diverted northwards to empty into the Marecchia in the 1960s.

After Rimini Marina, the railway crossed the Via Flaminia along the present-day Via Edelweiss Rodriguez Senior. The route continued in a straight line until reaching the banks of the Ausa by Cerasolo, where, after Coriano-Cerasolo station, it turned right along the Ausa.

The railway bisected San Marino along the present-day Strada dei Censiti/Strada degli Ascrittizi in Rovereta, but was considered properly in Sammarinese territory only after crossing the Ausa at the Mellini Border Bridge. From there, the line turned left as it entered Dogana. The first helical tunnel was sited between the stations of Dogana and Serravalle. After Serravalle, the line turned left to make a horseshoe turn past the village of Fiorina, and made a second horseshoe turn before reaching the railway station of Domagnano. After the station of Valdragone, the line made three horseshoe turns to reach the station of Borgo Maggiore. The final helical tunnel was located between Borgo Maggiore and the City of San Marino, and the line ended after a final horseshoe turn into the city's railway station.

The railway was 31.4 kilometres (19.5 miles) in length, of which 19.81 kilometres (12.31 miles) were in Sammarinese territory. The train started 3 metres (9.8 feet) above sea level in Rimini, and finished 642.8 metres (2,109 feet) above sea level in San Marino. The average gradient in the Italian section was 0.43%, compared to sections reaching a gradient of 4.5% in the Sammarinese section.

The restored section comprises the final horseshoe turn through the 502-metre (1,647-foot) Montale tunnel. Its total length is 800 metres (1/2 mile), running between Piazzale della Stazione and near Via Napoleone.

== Features ==
=== Technical ===
The line was 31.4 kilometres (19.5 miles) long, and used a 950 mm (3 ft 1 3/8 in) narrow gauge. It was electrified at 3,000 volts DC. The overhead contact wire was supported by tubular metal poles with hot-dip galvanised tubular brackets; its height was 6 metres (20 feet), reduced to 4.5 metres (15 feet) in the tunnelled sections. The only substation along the line was located in Dogana.

The restored section is electrified at 480 volts DC.

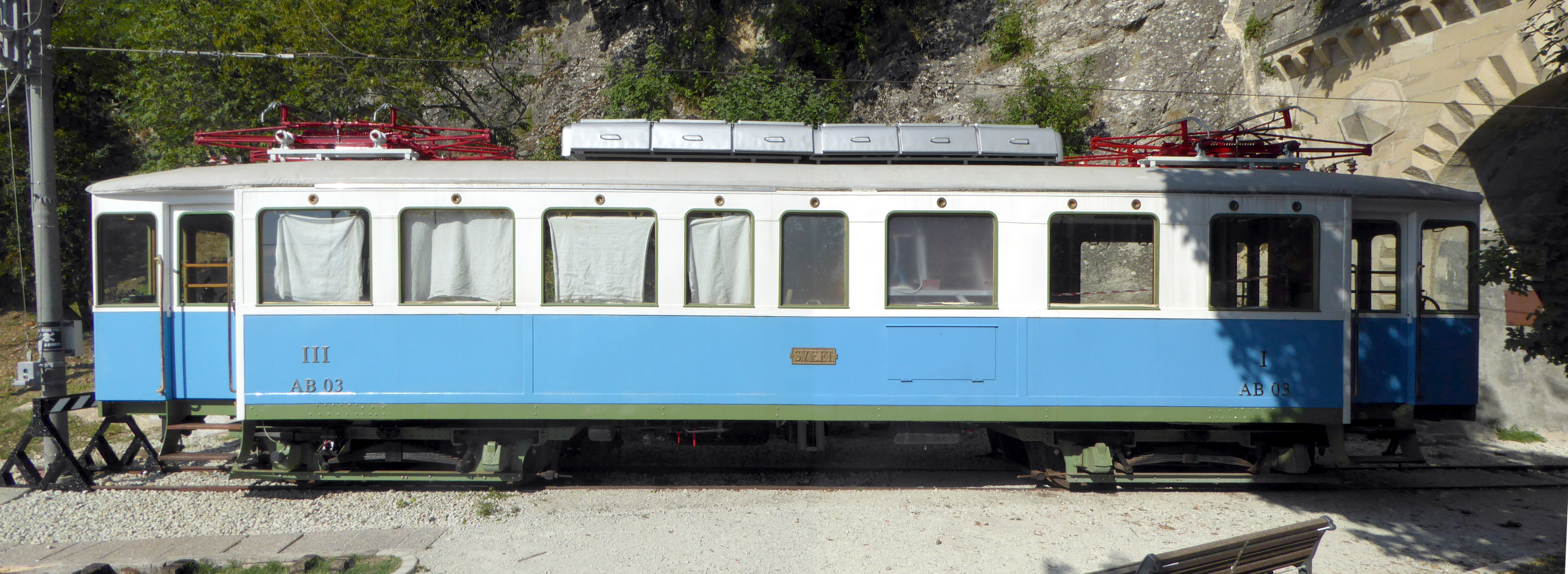
The AB-03 railcar, September 2015

=== Rolling stock ===
The line was served by four electric railcars built in 1931 by Carminati & Toselli of Milan, with electrical equipment by TIBB. The railcars were capable of reaching 65 km/h (40 mph), but ran at approximately 31 km/h (19 mph) in the Sammarinese section. Only railcars AB-01, badly damaged and awaiting restoration, and AB-03, which was restored, survive. Railcars AB-02 and AB-04 were sold to the Genova–Casella railway, though the latter was damaged in an arson attack while still sheltered in a Sammarinese tunnel. The motors of both railcars were used on the former rolling stock of the Trento–Malè–Mezzana railway.

The carriages provided first-class and economy seating in different arrangements, and some carriages included a postal compartment. All wagons were equipped with pneumatic brakes. The livery was in the Sammarinese colours of white and blue. In 1938, the luggage areas in some classes were modified into third-class seating. One AB-51 carriage survives on the viaduct between Fontevecchia and Valdragone; it was restored in 1983 and again in the 2000s.

The rolling stock was serviced from a depot adjacent to Rimini Marina station. The depot also housed snowplows, which could be mounted onto electric motors to clear the line after heavy snowfall.

=== Services ===
There were between four and ten services per day. The journey would last between 53 and 67 minutes, with fares ranging from 7.50 lire in economy to 12.40 lire in first class. Each service included a train crew of a conductor and an engineer. Some services included a brakeman at the rear of the train.

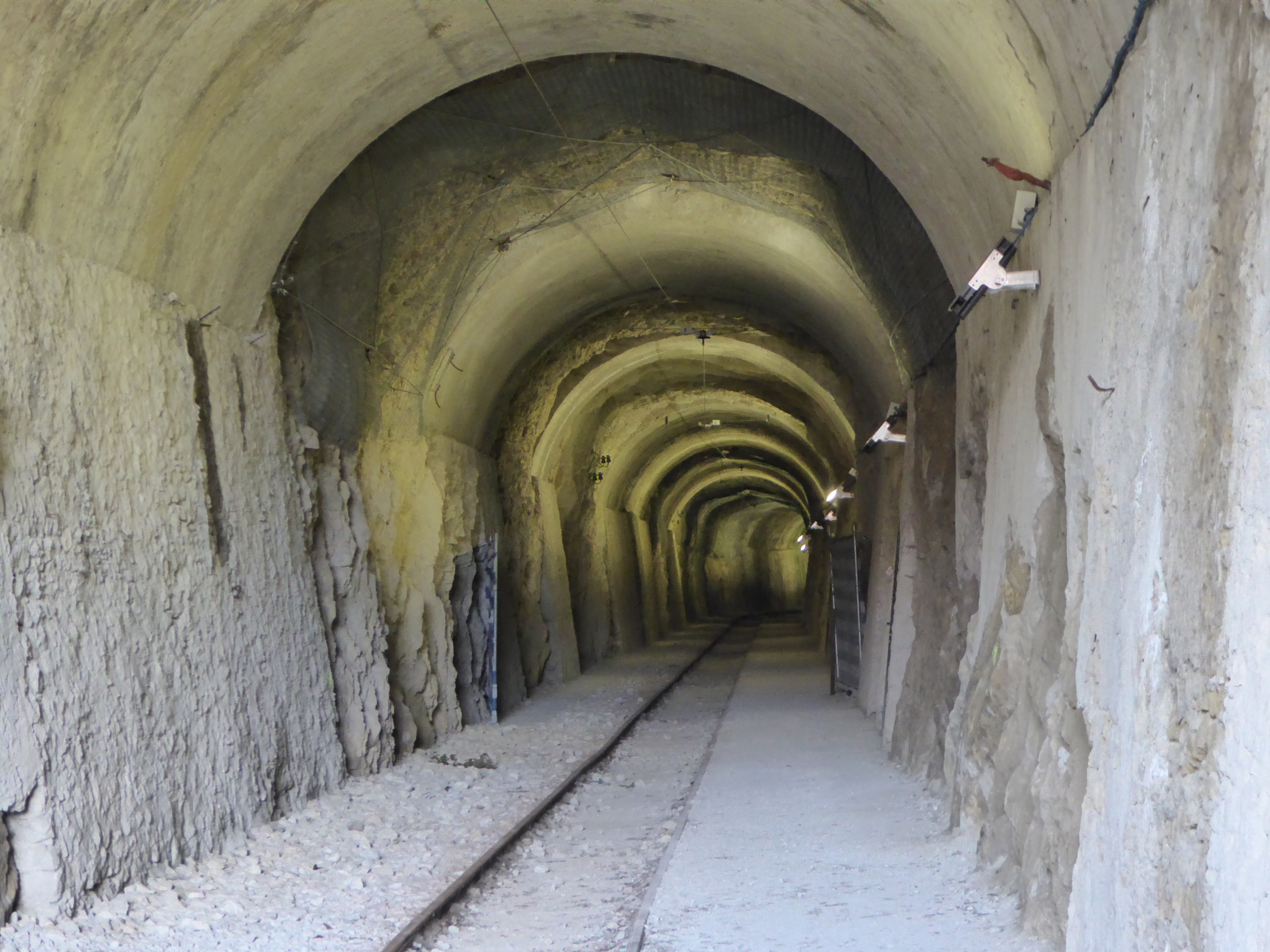
The Montale tunnel, September 2015

=== Infrastructure ===
The railway line included seventeen tunnels, of which two were helical, as well as three bridges, three viaducts, an overpass, and an underpass. It was considered a significant engineering feat at its time.

Most of the viaducts and stations are still extant. The Mellini Border Bridge, which crossed the Torrente Ausa near Rovereta, was demolished after the closure of the line. The Bustrach Viaduct, located after Borgo Maggiore's railway station, was dismantled in the 1960s to widen the San Marino Highway.

Tunnels of the Rimini–San Marino railway
Tunnel	Length	Current state and notes
Montale	502 m (1,647 ft)	Restored and operational. The inside curve has a radius of 109 metres (358 feet) and a length of 421 metres (1,381 feet).
Via Plana	92 m (302 ft)	
Piagge	515 m (1,690 ft)	Helical
Montalbo	185 m (607 ft)	In use as a pedestrian walkway
Borgo	173 m (568 ft)	In use as a pedestrian walkway
Santa Maria	697 m (2,287 ft)	
Calintuffo	186 m (610 ft)	
Valdragona	43 m (141 ft)	
Fonte Vecchia	92 m (302 ft)	
Cerbaiola	51 m (167 ft)	
Cà Gozi	126 m (413 ft)	
Cà Giannino	250 m (820 ft)	
Lisignano	246 m (807 ft)	In use as a pedestrian walkway
Cà Vir	78 m (256 ft)	
Sant'Andrea	258 m (846 ft)	In use as a single-lane road
Poggio di Serravalle	367 m (1,204 ft)	Helical

== Stations ==
At the time of the railway's construction, stations without freight-handling capacity were classified as stops, namely: Rimini Marina, Rimini Colonella, Coriano-Cerasolo, Dogana, Domagnano-Montelupo, and Valdragone.

=== Rimini railway station ===
Opened in 1861, and rebuilt in 1914, Rimini railway station is sited on the Bologna–Ancona railway, and interchanges with the Ferrara–Rimini railway. The Rimini–San Marino railway began at platform 1, at the eastern end of Rimini's railway station. Services to San Marino from Rimini's railway station ceased from 27 November 1943.

At the time of the Rimini–San Marino railway's operation, platform 1 was less than 150 metres (490 feet) from the Rimini Centrale terminus of the Rimini–Novafeltria railway, which operated between 1916 and 1960. To distinguish Rimini's railway station from other minor stations in Rimini's city centre, it was sometimes called 'Rimini Stato'.

=== Rimini Marina railway station ===
Rimini Marina railway station was located on Via Giovanni Pascoli, and was the largest station after Rimini on the Rimini–San Marino railway. The station comprised three buildings built between 1926 and 1932: a passenger building of approximately 100 m^{2} (1,100 sq ft), a depot of approximately 430 m^{2} (4,600 sq ft), and a workshop of approximately 2,450 m^{2} (26,400 sq ft).

During the Allied aerial bombardment of Rimini on 26 and 27 November 1943, two bombs that hit the depot did not detonate. Services to Rimini Marina ceased following the bombardment.

The depot was demolished after sustaining significant wartime damage, while the former station building was turned into a driving test centre. In the 1970s, the municipal council freely conceded the building to a social cooperative, which has used it as a flower cultivation centre and a nursery. In January 2023, the municipal government announced that its three-year Public Works Plan included rebuilding the depot building and renovating the extant buildings and surrounding area into a historical-cultural centre.

=== Rimini Colonnella railway station ===
Rimini Colonnella railway station was located at the level crossing of the Rimini–San Marino railway with the Via Flaminia. Initially only a flagman's booth, it was reclassified as a stop and became the railway's Rimini terminus from 27 November 1943. The booth was the only manned level crossing on the railway line: the other ninety intersections were unattended or secured using padlocks by the owners of the adjacent farmland.

The booth is still extant on Via Edelweiss Rodriguez Senior. In May 2022, as part of the surrounding area's regeneration, Rimini's municipal council requested that the building be transferred from state property to local control.

=== Coriano-Cerasolo railway station ===
Coriano-Cerasolo railway station was located in Cerasolo, a frazione of Coriano. The surrounding area is better known as Cerasolo Ausa, 250 metres (820 feet) south of the Torrente Ausa and 1.2 kilometres (0.75 miles) from Cerasolo's castle. Despite its name, the station was located some 6.2 kilometres (3.9 miles) from the centre of Coriano, measured from the town's church.

The station building still exists and is residential property. A restaurant in Cerasolo Ausa in the 1970s was called Vecchia Stazione ('Old Station'), which remains the name of the nearest bus stop.

=== Dogana railway station ===
Dogana railway station was located just off Via Consiglio dei Sessanta, the road that connected Rimini and San Marino before the San Marino Highway. The station building still exists and hosts the Catholic Guide and Scout Association of San Marino.

=== Serravalle railway station ===
Serravalle railway station was located on Via Carlo Padiglione, at the western end of the town. The track was doubled at the station, which included a goods warehouse. The station building still exists and is residential property.

=== Domagnano-Montelupo railway station ===
Domagnano-Montelupo railway station was located just off Via Francesco Flora, at the northern end of Domagnano. The foundations at the rear of the station building collapsed shortly after its construction; despite being reinforced by concrete in the 1930s, the inclination remained.

In 2008, the Sammarinese government gifted the derelict station building to La Genga, a hiker's association, who renovated the building and made it its headquarters. Some abandoned freight wagons are still present in the vicinity of the station.

=== Valdragone railway station ===
Valdragone railway station was located on Via Ovella. The station building still exists and is residential property.

=== Borgo Maggiore railway station ===
Borgo Maggiore railway station was located on the present-day Via Ventotto Luglio, near Borgo Maggiore's elementary school and less than 100 metres (330 feet) downhill from the present-day Borgo Maggiore terminus of the San Marino cablecar system.

The station was double-tracked, with one short track on the Rimini side serving the station's goods warehouse. After the line's closure, the railway station was demolished and became a car park.

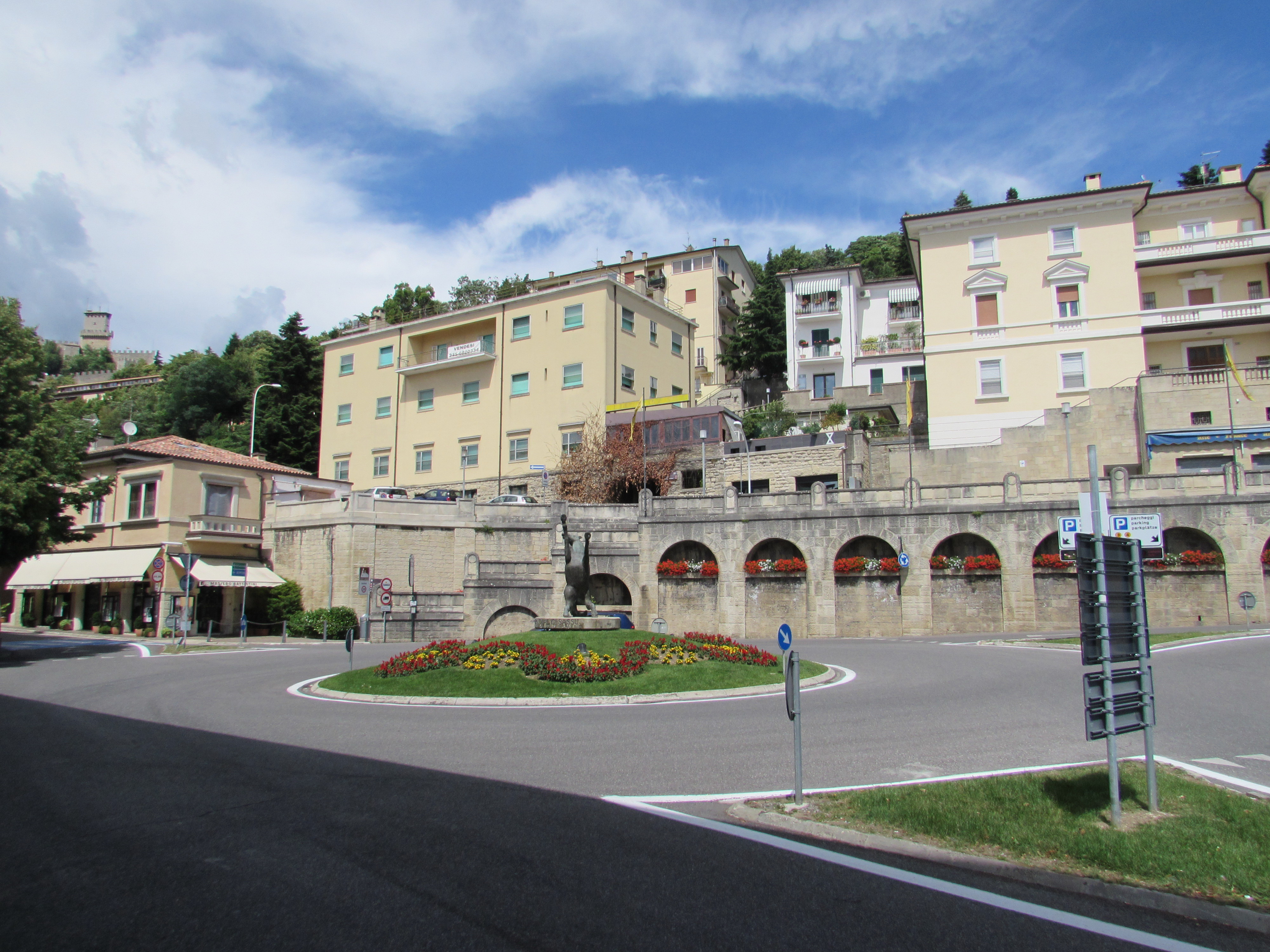
Piazzale della Stazione, the site of San Marino's former railway station, July 2014

=== San Marino railway station ===
San Marino railway station was located on the present-day Piazzale della Stazione. The station included a first-class passenger building, a goods warehouse, a locomotive shed with a small workshop, and a dormitory. After the line's closure, the railway station was demolished and became a car park.
