= Funivia di San Marino =

Cablecar system in San Marino

San Marino Cablecar System
- Funivia di San Marino
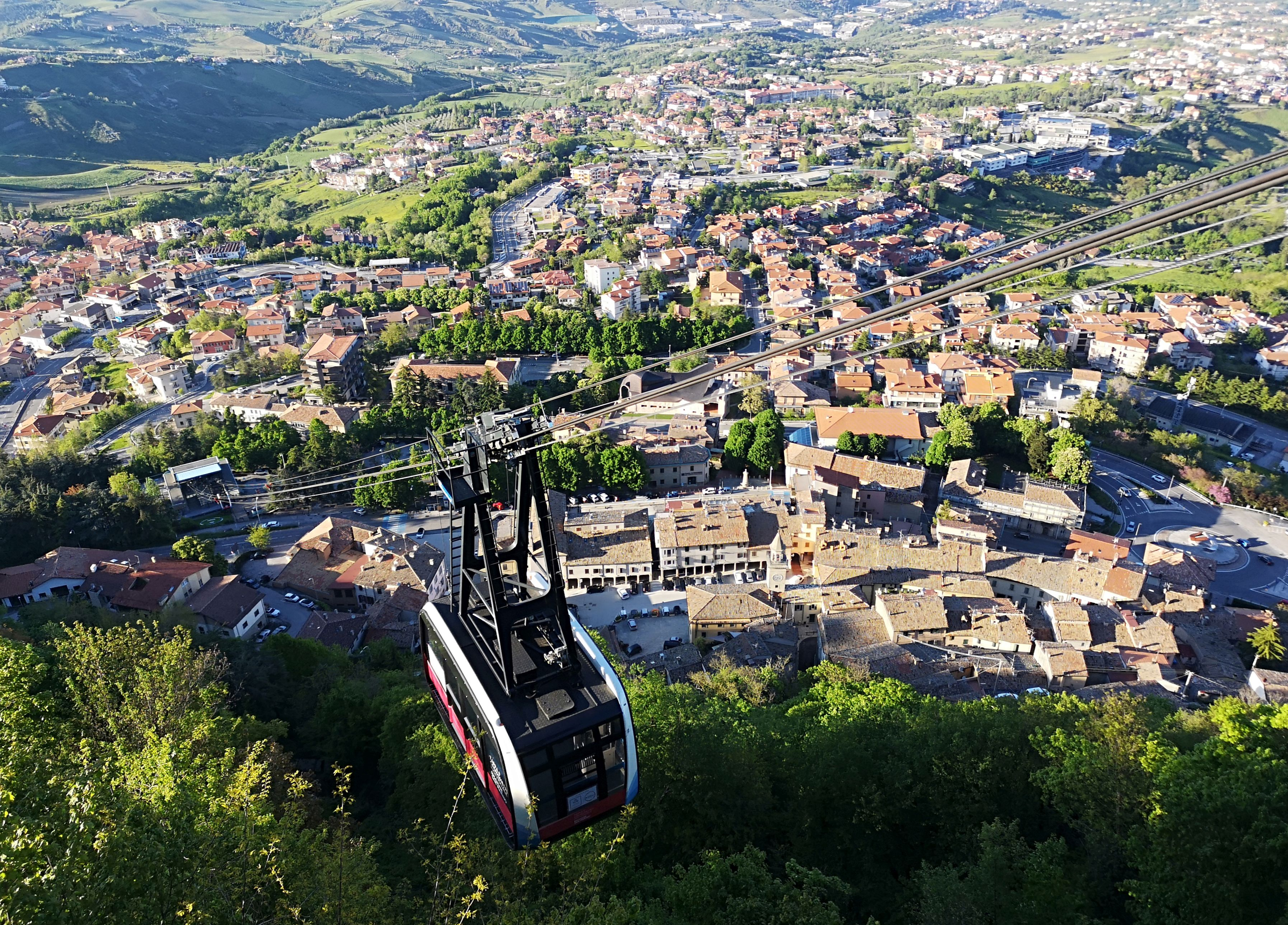
- A cablecar overlooks Borgo Maggiore in May 2019.
- Interactive map of San Marino Cablecar System

Overview
- Status: Operational
- Character: Urban
- System: Transport in San Marino
- Location: Piazzale Campo della Fiera, Borgo Maggiore
- Country: Republic of San Marino
- Coordinates: 43°56′25.41″N 12°26′43.54″E
- Termini: Borgo Maggiore; City of San Marino
- No. of stations: 2
- Open: 1 August 1959; 67 years ago
- Website: www.sanmarinosite.com

Operation
- Owner: Azienda Autonoma di Stato per i Servizi Pubblici
- Operator: Azienda Autonoma di Stato per i Servizi Pubblici
- No. of carriers: 2
- Carrier capacity: 50
- Ridership: c. 500,000 passengers yearly
- Operating times: 07:45–18:30 (November–February); 07:45–19:00 (March, October); 07:45–19:30 (April); 07:45–20:00 (May–June, mid-September–October); 07:45–01:00 (July–mid-September)
- Trips daily: 88–138
- Trip duration: 2 minutes
- Fare: €3.00 (one-way adult)

Technical features
- Aerial lift type: Aerial cablecar
- Manufactured by: Doppelmayr Italia
- Line length: 338 metres (1,109 feet) (inclined length); 294 metres (965 feet) (run length)
- No. of cables: 2
- Operating speed: 6 metres per second (13 miles per hour)

The San Marino cablecar system (Italian: Funivia di San Marino), also advertised as the San Marino Ropeway, is an aerial cablecar system in the Republic of San Marino. The line runs between a lower terminus of Borgo Maggiore to an upper terminus in the City of San Marino.

Running every fifteen minutes, the two-minute ride is renowned for its panoramic views over San Marino, the Province of Rimini, and the Adriatic Sea. The cablecar system is a major tourist attraction, and considered a defining symbol of San Marino.

The cablecar system transports 500,000 passengers yearly across approximately 21,000 trips. It is managed and operated by the Azienda Autonoma di Stato per i Servizi Pubblici, the Sammarinese state company for public transport.

== History ==
=== Rimini–San Marino railway ===
Between 1932 and 1944, Borgo Maggiore and the City of San Marino were connected by the Rimini–San Marino railway. Borgo Maggiore's railway station was located on the present-day Via Ventotto Luglio, near Borgo Maggiore's elementary school and less than 100 metres (330 feet) downhill from the present-day Borgo Maggiore terminus. San Marino's railway station, the line's terminus, was located on the present-day Piazzale della Stazione.

During the Second World War, the line was bombed and closed. After several years of negotiation between the Italian and Sammarinese governments, by 1958, it had been decided to replace the railway with the San Marino Highway. Both railway stations were demolished and became car parks.

The San Marino cablecar system effectively replaced the railway connection between Borgo Maggiore and the City of San Marino, particularly given that the San Marino Highway finishes in Borgo Maggiore.

=== Construction and early years ===
Work on the cablecar system began in 1956, with its construction contracted to Agudio, a Turinese company. The necessary safety tests were completed by technicians from the Italian Ministry of Transport.

The cablecar system was inaugurated on 1 August 1959 with a maiden voyage on which a statue of Our Lady of Fátima travelled from Borgo Maggiore to the City of San Marino. The original cablecar could accommodate fifteen people. A single fare cost 50 lire, with a return costing 80.

The line was popular among tourists and residents alike, with 230,000 trips in its first ten years of operation. A new cablecar entered service in March 1967; it was renovated in 2014, and installed in March 2015 on a roundabout along Strada Sottomontana, the road connecting Borgo Maggiore to the village of Murata.

=== Interchange with the Borgo Maggiore heliport ===
The terminus at Borgo Maggiore was sited next to a heliport, which had inaugurated its first postal flights in September 1950. It was at this heliport that the statue of Our Lady of Fátima, the aerial cablecar's first passenger, had arrived by helicopter from Forlì on 24 July 1959.

Between 1961 and 1969, Compagnia Italiana Elicotteri operated helicopter flights between Borgo Maggiore and Rimini's port; the service was extended to San Leo in 1964. The cablecar to the City of San Marino was included in flight tickets, which would cost up to 12,500 lire. After the service's closure in 1969, the heliport was replaced by a parking lot for the Funivia.

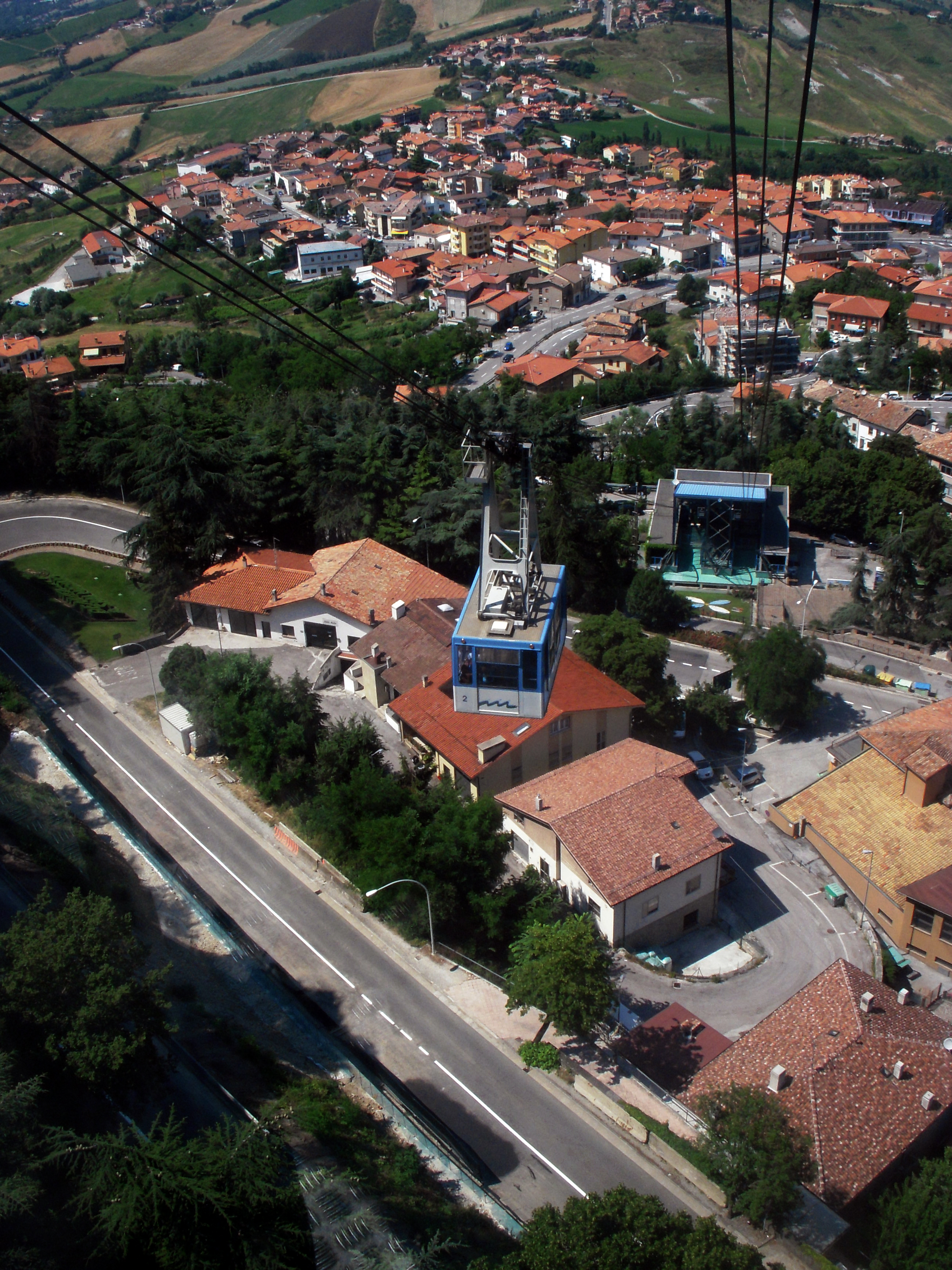
The cablecars in June 2010, prior to the 2017 modernisation

=== Modernisations and recent history ===
From 5 March 1995, the system was modernised with double load-bearing cables built by Doppelmayr Italia; the electromechanical works were awarded to Holz, a company from Bolzano. The modernisation allowed fifty passengers per cablecar, and more than doubled the hourly capacity. The old stations were demolished, and new stations designed by architect Jacek Sokalski were built in their place.

The new cablecar system was inaugurated on 25 May 1996. Aboard the maiden journey were the Captains Regent, and a commemorative postage stamp was released to mark the occasion.

In spring 2017, a second modernisation programme replaced the cablecars, ticket gates, trolleys, shock absorbers, and electrical and safety equipment. After three months of work, the system reopened on 15 April 2017.

The system was closed between February and June 2020, first for scheduled maintenance, and then as a result of the COVID-19 pandemic. It reopened with reduced capacity, social distancing, and obligatory mask-wearing.

== Technical features ==
The line traverses an inclined length of 338 metres (1,109 feet) over a run of 294 metres (965 feet), for a difference in elevation of 166 metres (545 feet). It runs at 6 metres per second (13 miles per hour).

The system uses double load-bearing cables using a traditional suspension mechanism. Each cablecar is equipped with four hydraulic brakes in the event that the haul rope breaks.

== Services ==
The service runs every fifteen minutes from 7.45am. As of December 2023, depending on the season, the last ride is between 6.30pm (November until March) and 1.00am (July and August). Each car can accommodate fifty people, and the ride between termini takes two minutes.

As of December 2023, a single adult ticket costs three euros and a return ticket costs five euros; there are reductions for the disabled, groups, multi-trip passes, and monthly student and adult passes. Children under 1.2 metres (3.9 feet) travel free. Dogs can travel if they are muzzled and leashed, and luggage can be carried aboard; extra tickets may be required for large dogs or bulky luggage.

The system often closes for scheduled maintenance for a few weeks in late February and early March. It is known to close by adverse weather conditions, such as strong winds and after snowfall that freezes the haul cable.

== Stations ==
The current stations were built as part of the 1995–96 modernisation programme, and were designed by architect Jacek Sokalski, who co-designed the Central Tower in Warsaw. The stations were repainted in 2017.

=== Borgo Maggiore Terminus ===
The base station in Borgo Maggiore is located on Piazzale Campo della Fiera. The terminus is equipped with a large underground and ground-level car park. At ground-level, the station includes two entrances, a ticket office, and an accessible bathroom. The cablecars depart from the first floor, where there is a passenger waiting room, as well as shops and a bar. The station is fully accessible with lifts connecting the underground, ground, and first floors.

In March 2022, the Sammarinese government rejected plans for a multi-storey car park next to the terminus.

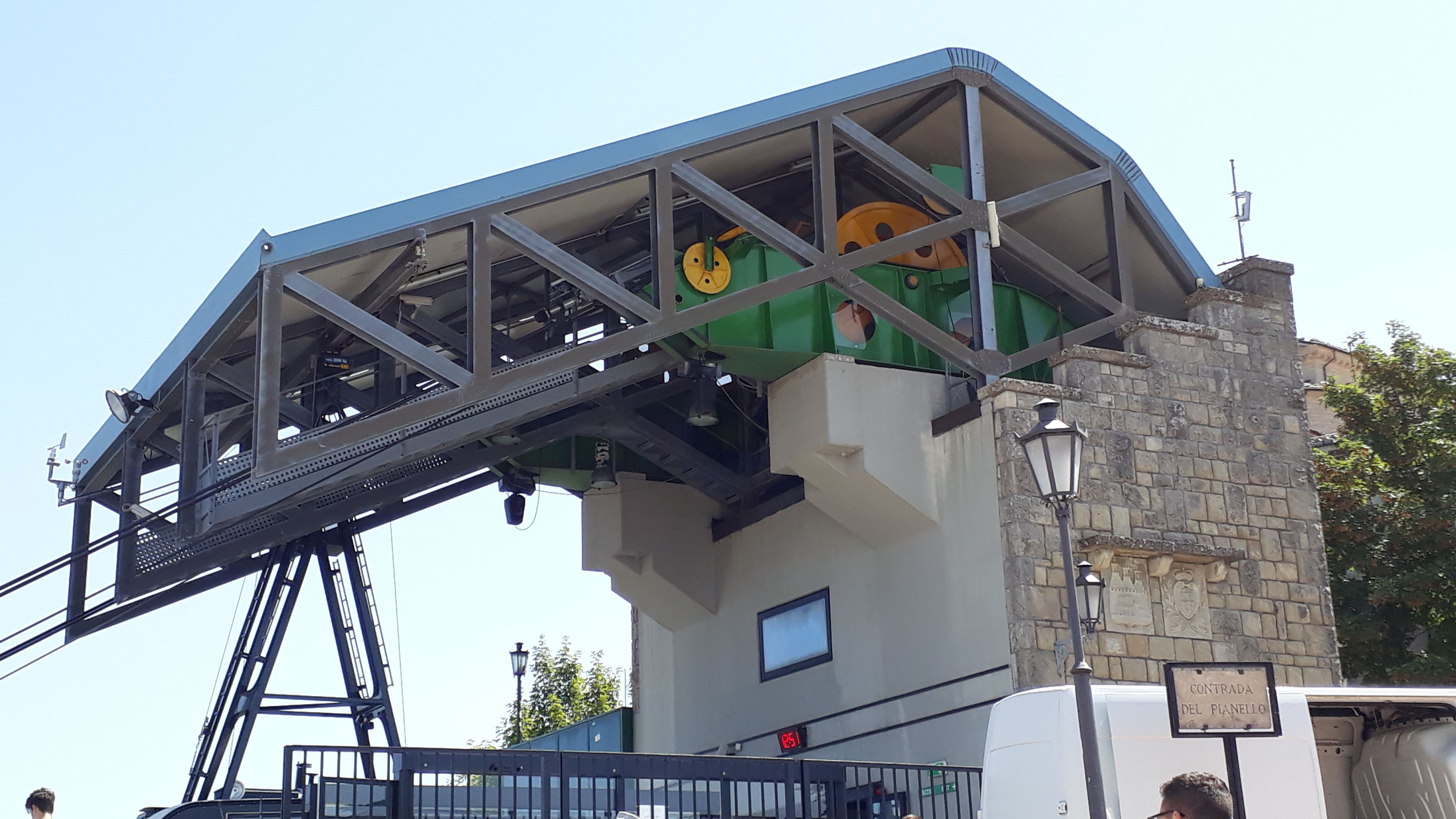
The City of San Marino terminus, August 2017

=== City of San Marino Terminus ===
The City of San Marino terminus is located at the turn of Contrada Omagnano with Contrada del Pianello, at the historic city centre's northern end, next to the Tourism Secretariat and less than 200 metres (660 feet) from the Basilica of San Marino and the Piazza della Libertà. The station is entirely at ground level and contains a waiting room.
