= Strada statale 72 di San Marino =

State highway in Italy

State Highway 72
- Strada statale 72
- di San Marino

Route information
- Maintained by ANAS
- Length: 10.7 km (6.6 mi)
- Existed: 1928–present

Major junctions
- From: Rimini
- To: State border near Cerasolo Ausa

Location
- Country: Italy
- Regions: Emilia-Romagna

Highway system
- Roads in Italy; Autostrade; State; Regional; Provincial; Municipal
← SS 71	→ SS 73

Strada statale 72 di San Marino (SS 72) is an Italian state highway 10.7 kilometres (6.6 mi) long in Italy located in the regions of Emilia-Romagna that connects the province of Rimini and connects the provincial capital with the Republic of San Marino. The current road, built after the World War II, is 10,600 km long and has a typically flat layout. It consists of two lanes in each direction of travel and replaces the old state road 72. The road begins on the outskirts of Rimini and ends at the Dogana state border. In San Marino, it continues as the San Marino Highway.

== History ==
Strada statale 72 was established in 1928 with the following route: "Rimini - San Marino border."

== Route ==
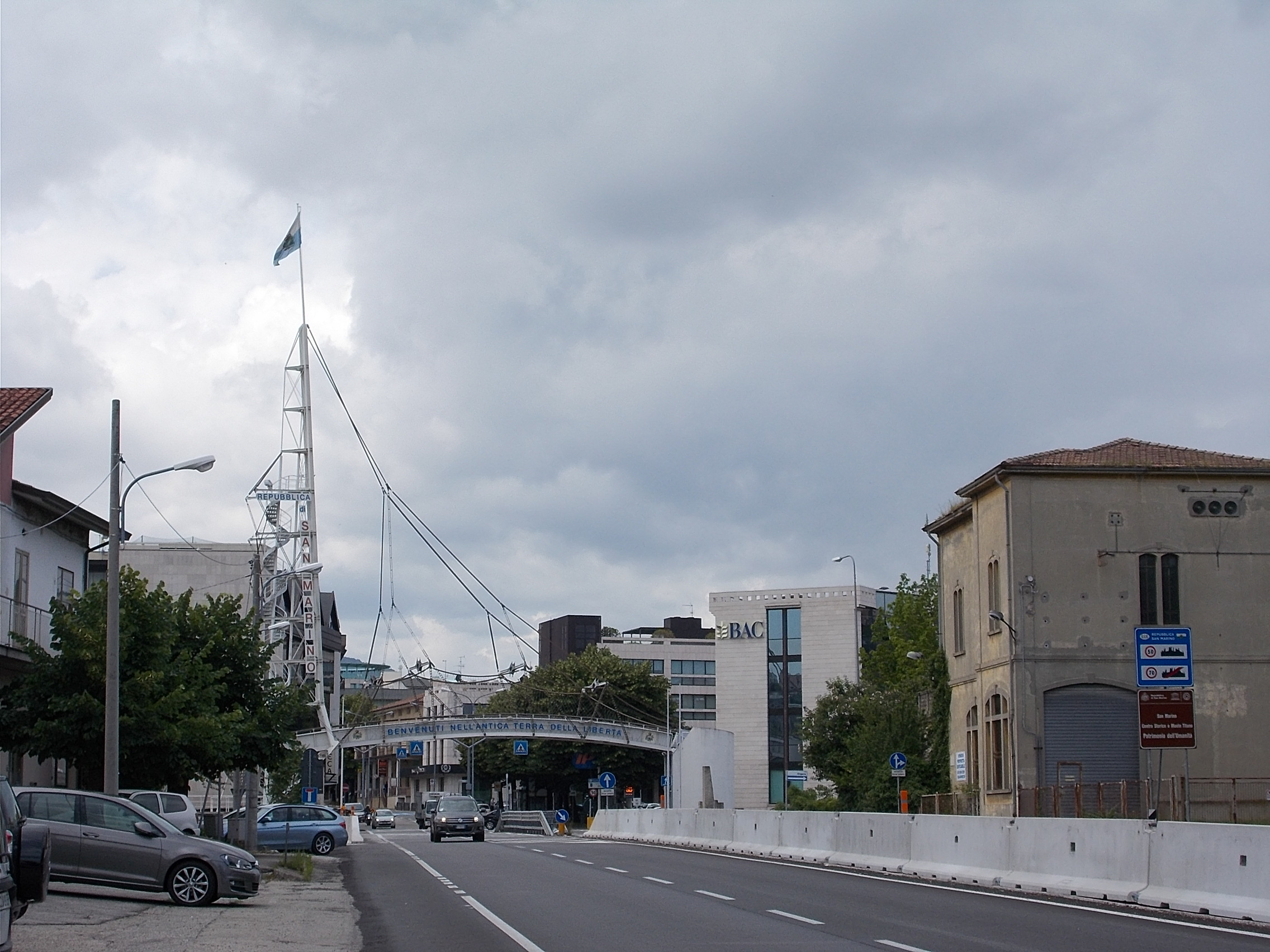
Strada statale 72 di San Marino in Rimini

di San Marino
Exit	↓km↓	↑km↑	Province
Adriatica; Rimini	0.0 km (0 mi)	10.7 km (6.6 mi)	--
Bologna-Taranto	0.7 km (0.43 mi)	9.9 km (6.2 mi)	--
Cerasolo	6.9 km (4.3 mi)	3.8 km (2.4 mi)	--
San Marino; Rovereta (San Marino)	8.4 km (5.2 mi)	2.3 km (1.4 mi)	--
San Marino; Strada di Fondovalle (San Marino)	10.6 km (6.6 mi)	0.1 km (0.062 mi)	--
Italy–San Marino border Superstrada di San Marino	10.7 km (6.6 mi)	0.0 km (0 mi)	--

== See also ==
- State highways (Italy)
- Roads in Italy
- Transport in Italy

=== Other Italian roads ===
- Autostrade of Italy
- Regional road (Italy)
- Provincial road (Italy)
- Municipal road (Italy)
