= Rovereta =

- Village
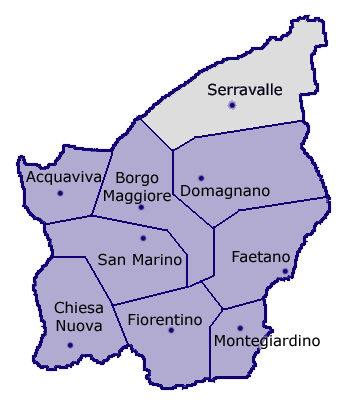
- Location of Serravalle in San Marino

- Location in San Marino
- Coordinates: 43°59′21.7″N 12°30′46.33″E
- Country: San Marino
- Municipality: Serravalle
- Elevation: 184 m (604 ft)
- Demonym: Roveretesi
- Time zone: UTC+1 (CET)
  - Summer (DST): UTC+2 (CEST)
- Postal code: 47891
- Area code: +378 (0549)

Rovereta is a curazia in northern San Marino, which belongs to the castello of Serravalle. Its name, in Italian, refers to a wood of "Sessile Oaks". It is San Marino's northeasternmost settlement.

== History ==
In 1957 there was a constitutional crisis named Fatti di Rovereta (the Rovereta affair), in which the Grand and General Council was deliberately rendered inquorate to prevent the scheduled election of Captains-Regent. A provisional government was established in the village, in opposition to the outgoing Captains-Regent whose term had expired.

== Geography ==
The village is situated in the north-western corner of its castle, close to Falciano and to the borders with Italy, at the industrial area of Cerasolo (a civil parish of Coriano). It is served by the National Road 72 Rimini-San Marino, the San Marino Highway.
