= Azienda Autonoma di Stato per i Servizi Pubblici =

San Marino's state-owned utility and transport provider

- Native name: Azienda Autonoma di Stato per i Servizi Pubblici
- Type: Public
- Industry: Public services
- Founded: 1981, San Marino
- Headquarters: Cailungo
- Area served: San Marino
- Key people: Renzo Giardi (Chairman of the Board); Marcello Forcellini (Director General)
- Number of employees: 232
- Website: http://www.aass.sm

Azienda Autonoma di Stato per i Servizi Pubblici (commonly abbreviated as AASS) (State Company for Public Services) is a state-owned joint-stock company in the Republic of San Marino. Established in 1981, it was founded to centralize and manage the domestic public transportation system, municipal waste collection, and the distribution of water, electricity, and methane gas. Prior to the unification of these utilities under AASS, such infrastructural services were provided to the republic on an unsystematic basis by various private Italian contractors.

In the sector of public transit, the company administers the national network consisting of ten distinct bus lines. Additionally, AASS operates the Funivia di San Marino, a heavily utilized aerial cable car system connecting the lower town of Borgo Maggiore to the historic capital city center on Mount Titano.

== See also ==
- Economy of San Marino
- Transport in San Marino
