= San Marino Highway =

Highway in San Marino

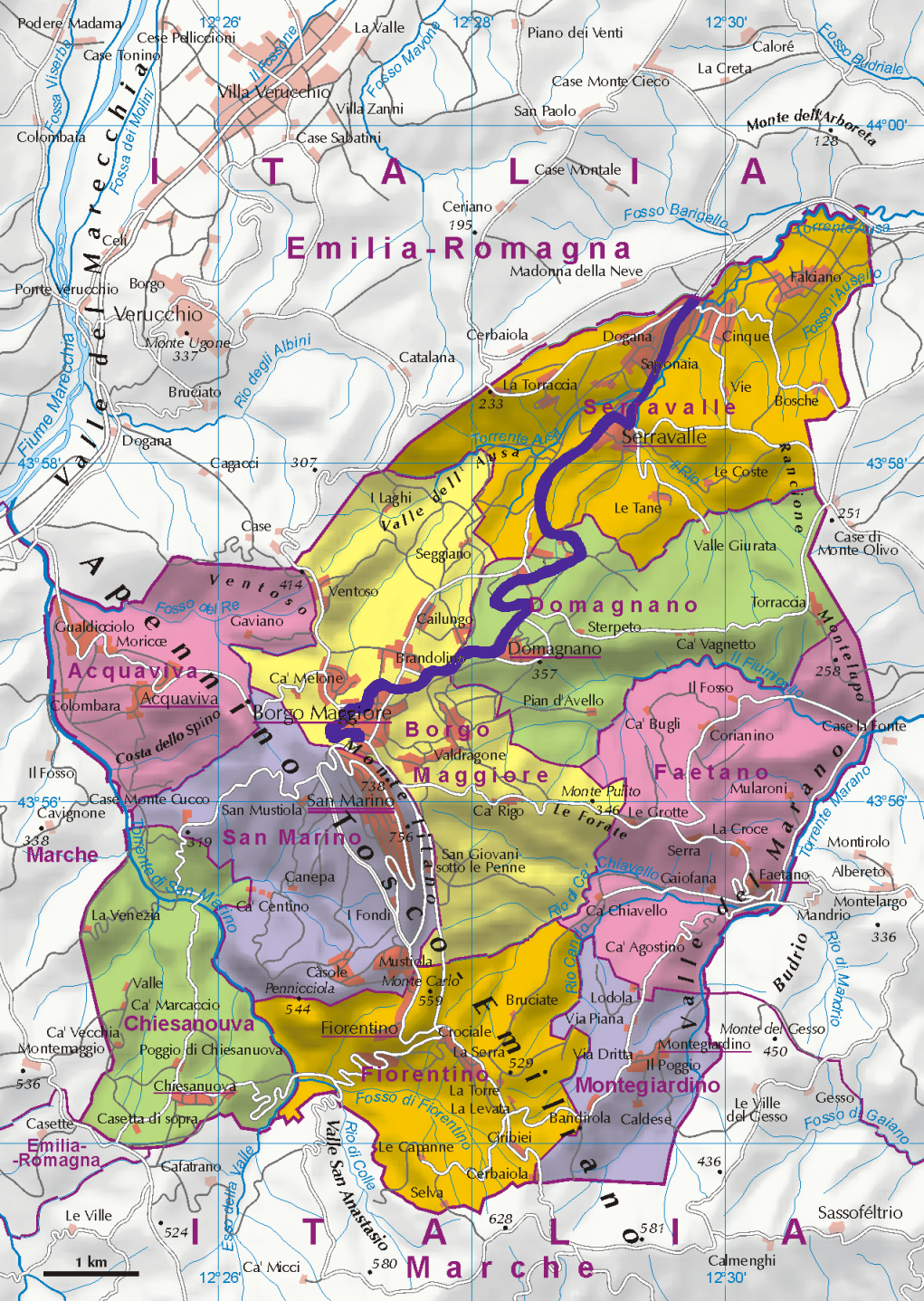

Route information
- Length: 8.9 km (5.5 mi)

Location
- Country: San Marino

Highway system
- Transport in San Marino

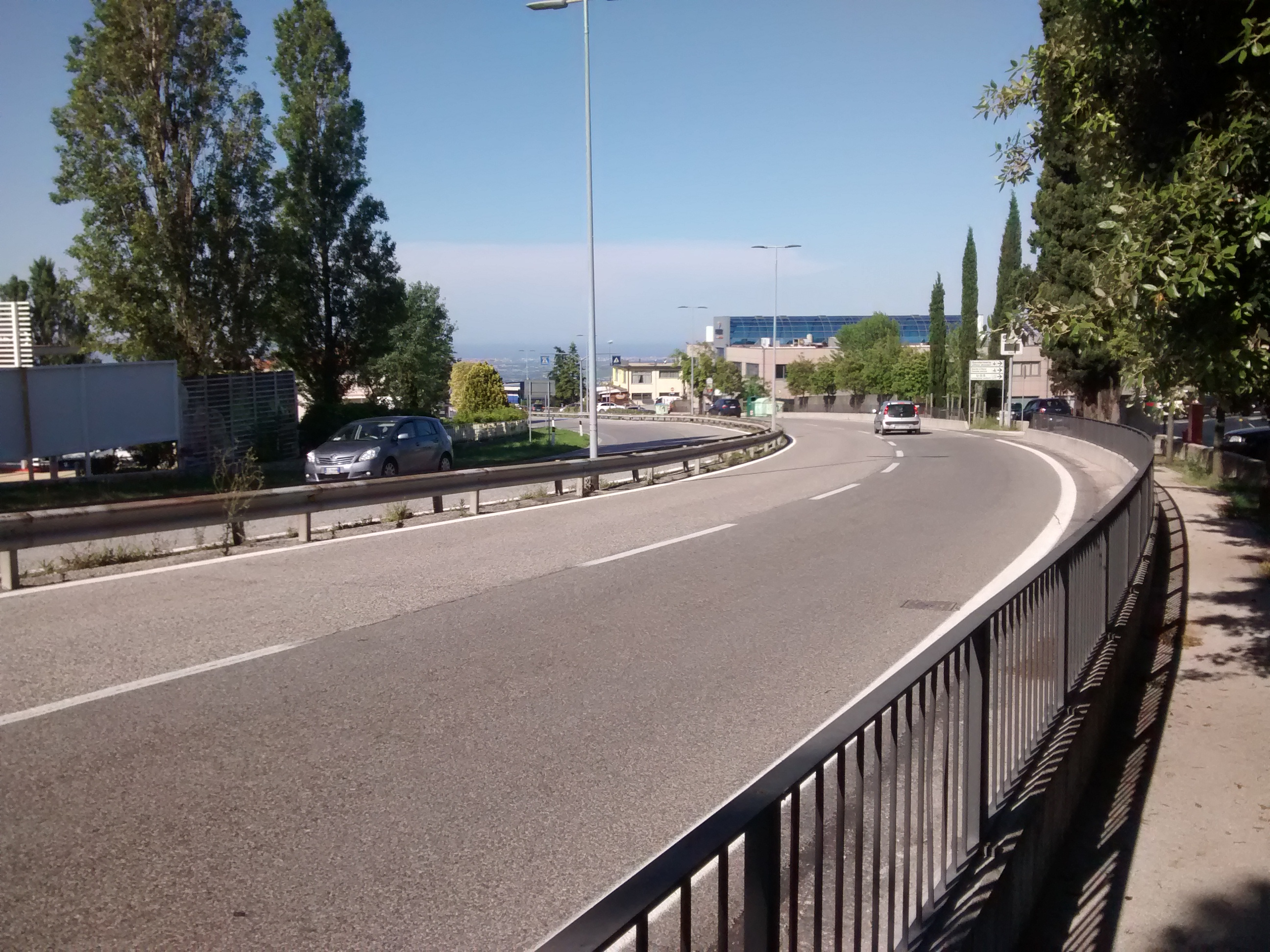
San Marino Highway

San Marino Highway is a road from the castelli of Borgo Maggiore, to Domagnano, through to Serravalle and then the town of Dogana, where it enters Italy. Part of it was built over the now defunct Rimini-San Marino railway line, which was destroyed during the Battle of Rimini. It is owned by the Sammarinese government.

The road is 8.9 km (5.5 miles) long and 18 meters wide, providing for two lanes in each direction. Work on its construction began on 10 August 1959 and the road was formally opened in the presence of senior political leaders from both Italy and San Marino on 25 November 1965.

Lined with shopping outlets, the Highway has been compared with "a good, two lane state highway in the United States."
