= Falciano =

Curazia of Serravalle, San Marino

- Curazia
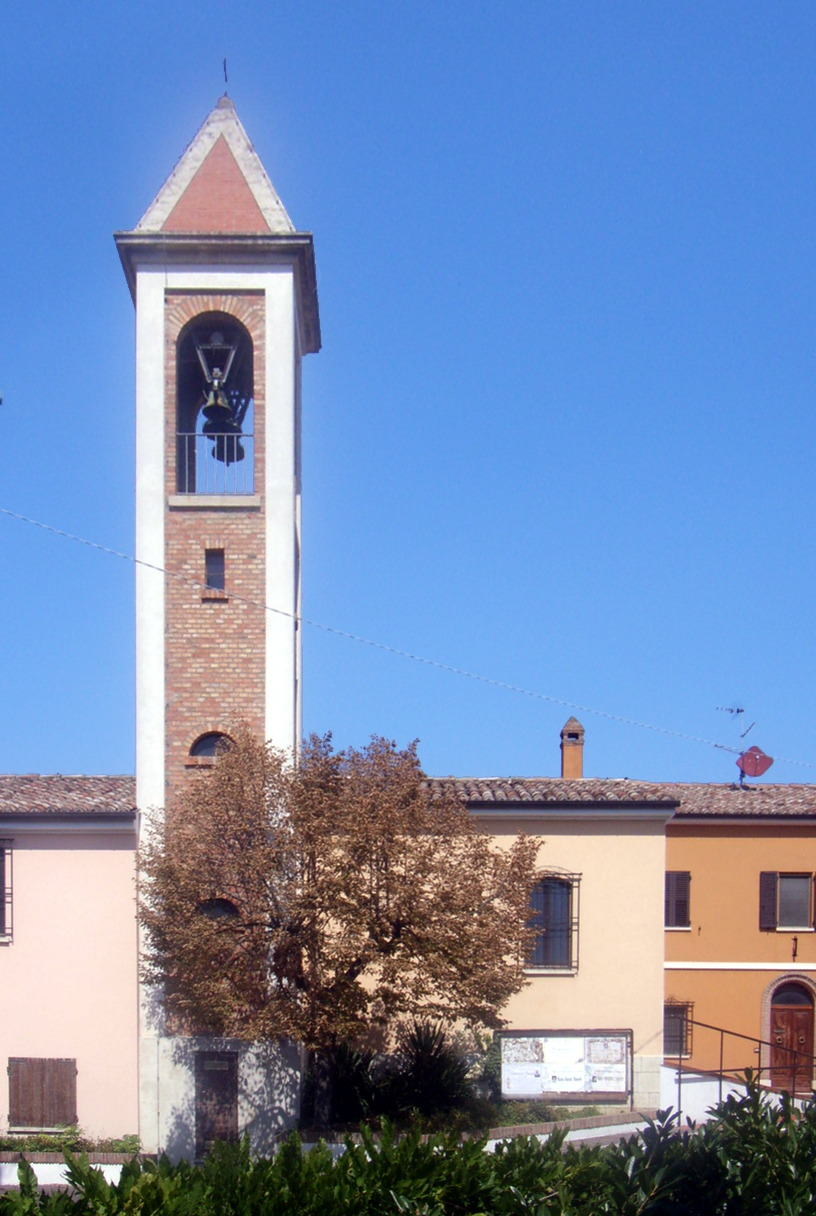
- Church in Falciano (2007)

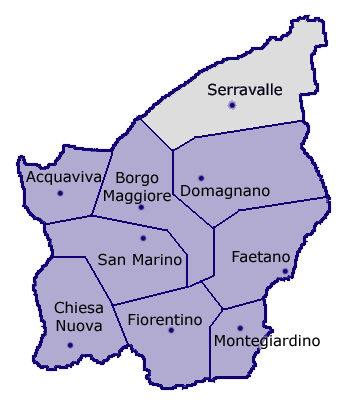
- Location of Serravalle within San Marino

- Location within San Marino
- Coordinates: 43°59′6.14″N 12°30′17.35″E
- Country: San Marino
- Municipality: Serravalle
- Elevation: 150 m (490 ft)

Population (2003)
  - Total: 1,000
- Demonym: Falcianesi
- Time zone: UTC+1 (CET)
  - Summer (DST): UTC+2 (CEST)
- Postal code: 47891
- Area code: +378 (0549)
- Climate: Cfa

Falciano is a curazia of San Marino. It belongs to the municipality of Serravalle.

== Geography ==
The village is located close to Dogana and to the borders with Italy.

== Sport ==
The local football team is the Folgore.
