= Dogana =

Curazia of Serravalle, San Marino

Dogana Dughena (Romagnol)
- Curazia
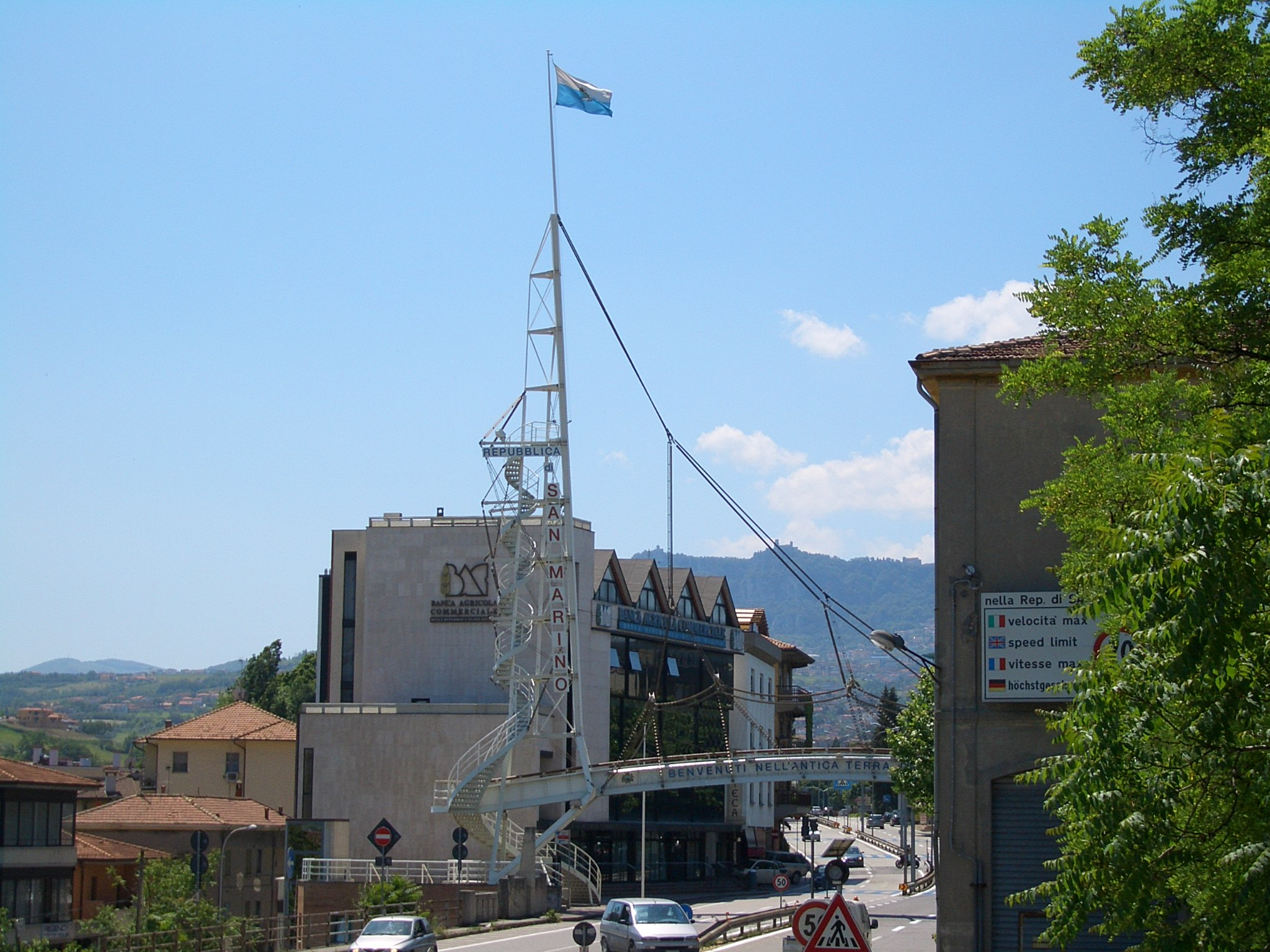
- Entry point into the Republic of San Marino in Dogana

- Location within San Marino
- Coordinates: 43°58′52.57″N 12°29′22.2″E
- Country: San Marino
- Castello: Serravalle
- Elevation: 150 m (490 ft)

Population
  - Total: 7,000
- Demonym: Doganieri
- Time zone: UTC+1 (CET)
  - Summer (DST): UTC+2 (CEST)
- Postal code: 47891
- Area code: +378 (0549)
- Climate: Cfa

Dogana (lit. 'Customs House'; Romagnol: Dughena) is a curazia of San Marino. It belongs to the municipality of Serravalle. The town is the most populated settlement in San Marino, with a population of around 7,000.

== Geography ==
The town is situated at the northernmost point of San Marino after Falciano, close to the border with Italy (at Cerasolo Ausa, a frazione of Coriano, in the province of Rimini).

== History ==
It has a population of roughly 7,000. Due to its size, in 2006 it asked to split away from Serravalle and become its own castello, but in 2007 the proposal was refused. Partial autonomy is reflected in Dogana's having its own postal code (47891), while the rest of Serravalle carries the designation 47899.

== Economy ==
Dogana is the main entry point for travellers arriving into San Marino from Italy (by Freeway no. 72 from Rimini). Although "Dogana" means "customs house" in Italian, there are no border formalities anywhere on the border between Italy and San Marino.

== Sport ==
The local football team is the Juvenes.

== Gallery ==
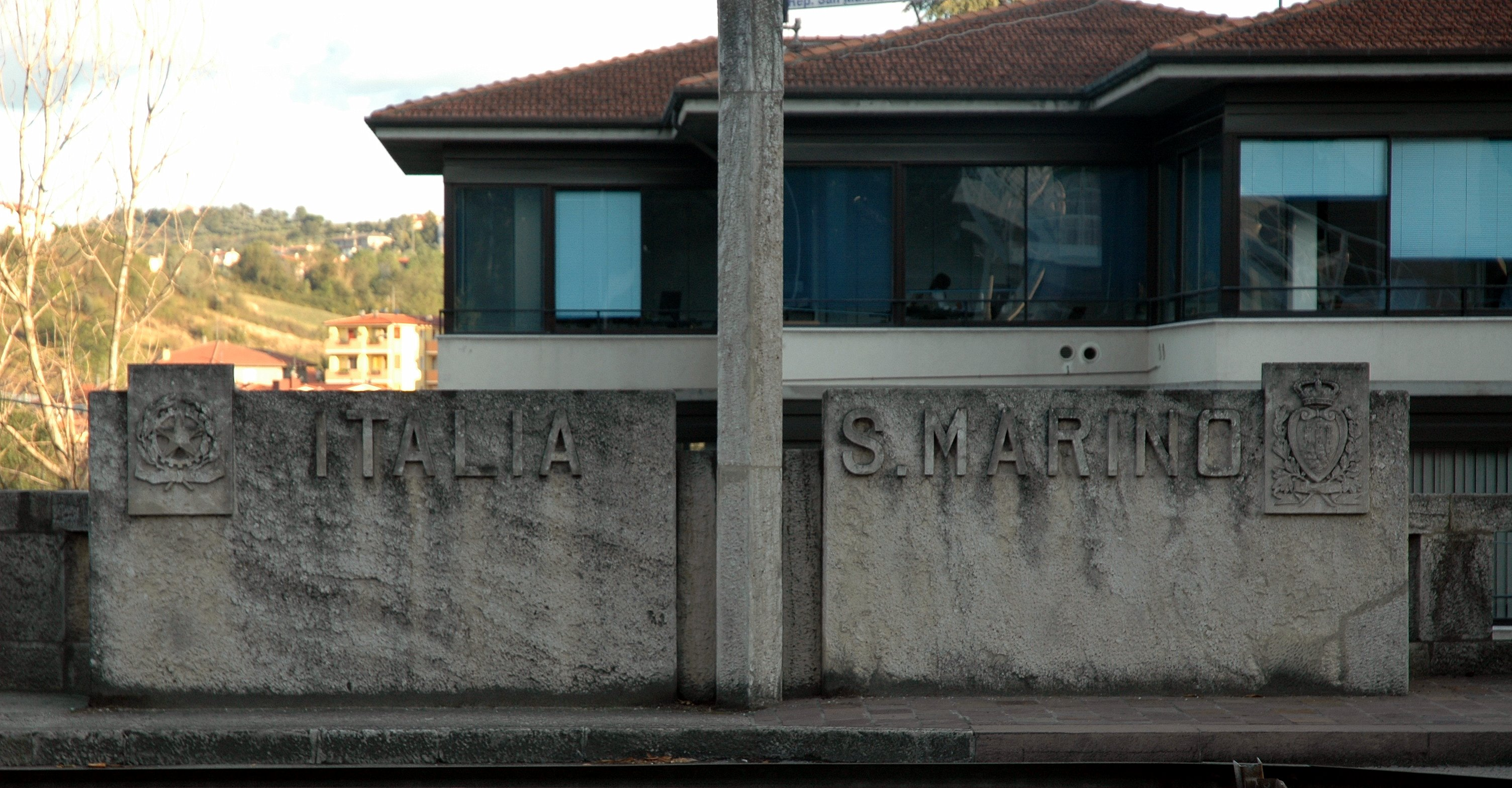
Border between Italy and San Marino at Dogana

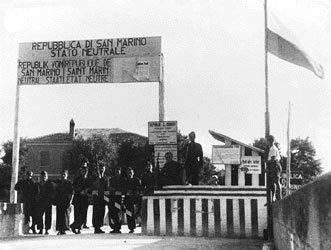
Neutrality placards at the borders of San Marino during World War II ("Republic of San Marino - Neutral State")
