= Murata (San Marino) =

Curazia of the City of San Marino, San Marino

- Curazia
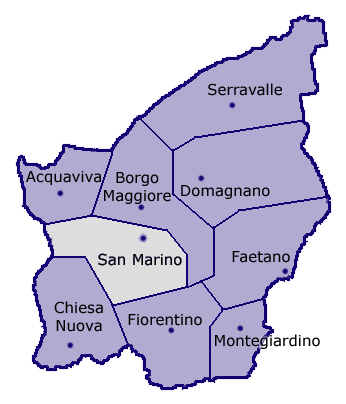
- Location of the castello of the City of San Marino within San Marino

- Location within San Marino
- Coordinates: 43°55′12.12″N 12°27′3.72″E
- Country: San Marino
- Castello: San Marino
- Elevation: 500 m (1,600 ft)

Population
  - Estimate (2005): 1,580
- Demonym: Muratesi
- Time zone: UTC+1 (CET)
  - Summer (DST): UTC+2 (CEST)
- Postal code: 47890
- Area code: +378 (0549)
- Climate: Cfb

Murata is a curazia of San Marino, in the castello of the City of San Marino. It is the most populated curazia of the City of San Marino.

== Geography ==
The village is situated on the hills between the City of San Marino and Fiorentino. It has a quarter named Fonte dell'Ovo, seat of the sport plants of Murata.

== Sport ==
The local football team is the S.S. Murata.

== Trivia ==
Murata also serves as the headquarters of the Party of Socialists and Democrats, one of the five major political parties of San Marino.
