= Coriano =

- Comune
- Comune di Coriano
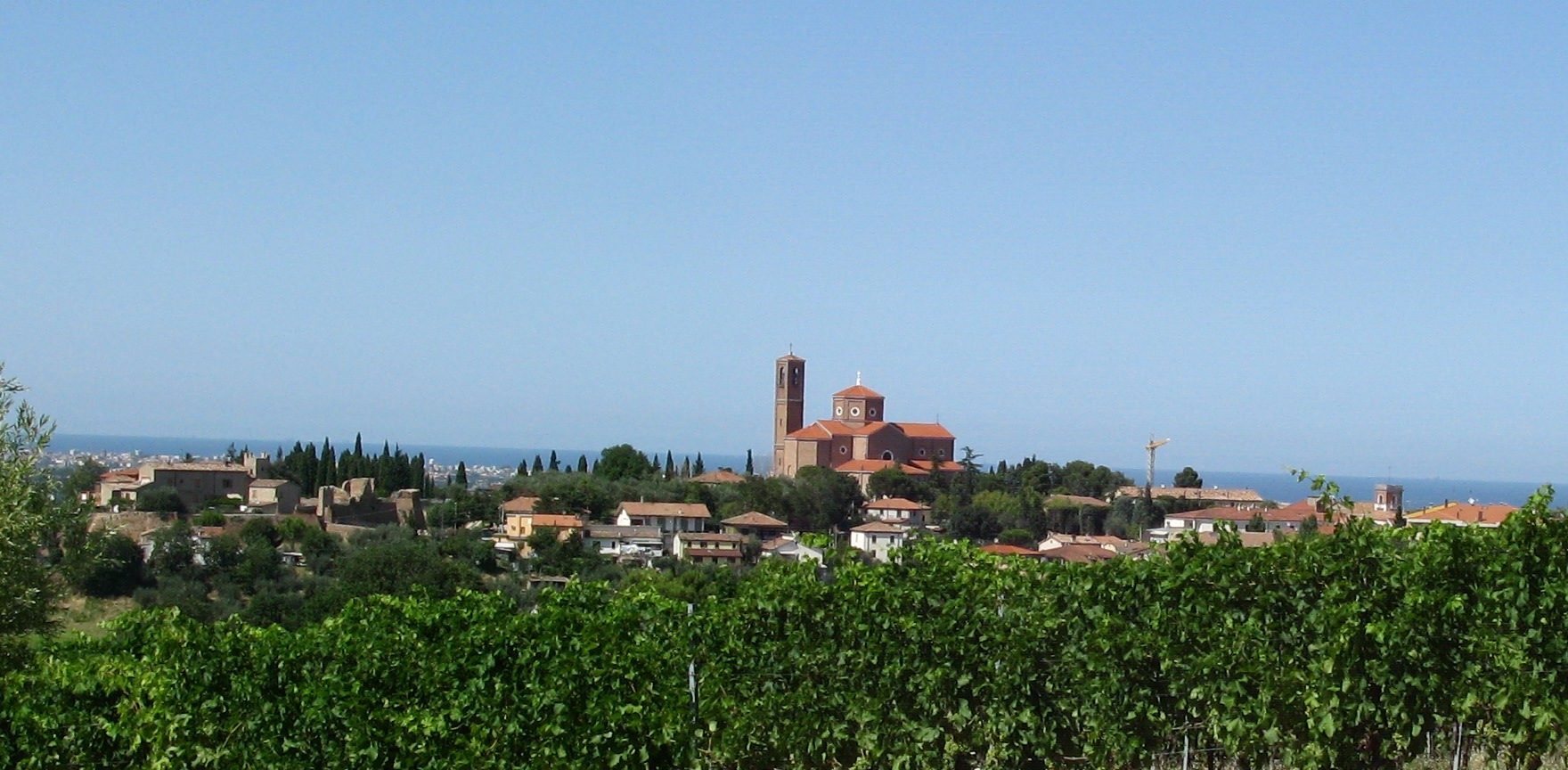

- Coat of arms

- Location within Italy Location within Emilia-Romagna
- Coordinates: 43°58′N 12°36′E
- Country: Italy
- Region: Emilia-Romagna
- Province: Rimini (RN)
- Frazioni: Vedi elenco

Government
  - Mayor: Gianluca Ugolini

Area
  - Total: 46.77 km^{2} (18.06 sq mi)
- Elevation: 102 m (335 ft)

Population (31 May 2022)
  - Total: 10,437
  - Density: 223.2/km^{2} (578.0/sq mi)
- Demonym: Corianesi
- Time zone: UTC+1 (CET)
  - Summer (DST): UTC+2 (CEST)
- Postal code: 47853
- Dialing code: 0541
- Patron saint: St. Sebastian
- Saint day: 20 January
- Website: Official website

Coriano (Romagnol: Curién) is a comune in the province of Rimini. The commune is known for being the hometown of Marco Simoncelli, a Motorcycle World Champion in the 250cc class.

== History ==
Coriano's origins are ancient: it was an Umbrian, Etruscan and Roman colony. It was also conquered by numerous armies fighting in Italy since the 12th century, including those of the Malatestas, by the Borgias, the Republic of Venice, the Spanish armies and the Papal States. In 1528, the Pope donated it to the Sassatelli from Imola in exchange for their help against the Malatestas.

In the following centuries, Coriano became the district capital of an area west of the Conca river, including Montescudo, Monte Colombo, San Clemente, Morciano di Romagna, and Misano. During the Cisalpine Republic and Italian Republic, the district capital moved to Montescudo. The return of the Papal States in 1805 restored Coriano's place. In the following years, Mulazzano was annexed to Coriano; in 1817, Monte Tauro and Passano were annexed, followed by the area left of the Marano river.

In September 1944, during World War II, one of the most deadly battles fought in Italy happened in Coriano, effectively razing the town. A Commonwealth cemetery outside Coriano numbers 1,940 soldiers, of which fifty were buried unidentified.

=== Seven castles ===
Towards the end of 1200, "Mastin Vecchio" Malatesta managed to establish its dominion over Rimini. His three children (Gianciotto, Malatestino of the Eye and Pandolfo I) they consolidated the power of the family, and they expanded the boundaries of the lordship castles and lands acquired by the Church of Ravenna and/or pulling them out to others (The Montefeltro). The Malatesta became lords of the land Corianese in 1300.

==== Coriano ====
Villa Corliani enters the possessions of the Malatesta in 1356, when the Church of Ravenna sells many places fortified areas of Pesaro and Rimini of Malatesta Guastafamiglia. In addition to Coriano (which at that time was only a fortified village), the supplies also included Montecolombo, Montescudo and Croce. Insufficient documents on the construction of the castle, but can be traced back to 1300, and the first renovations to 1144 (when Sigismondo Malatesta took care of the work in other rocks of Rimini). The first description is from 1504 and, in this case, the administrator Malipiero: "Castle 8 miles away from Arimino, circumfenced by a wall switch 7 Cumulative high shoe, and corridor top 5 foot, turn 194 passes. Dicto In castle accommodates 3 families. It has a door." Pope Clement VII in 1528 gave the castle to his brothers John and Robert Sassatelli from Imola: it remained their property until 1580, the emblem of the family is still driven into the door of the Castle and is the banner of Coriano. From 1800 to the Second World War, when military conflict caused major damage, the common fate of Coriano buildings of the fortress to various uses of a public nature. After the war, in parallel to the abandonment of the population that moved to the coast, the castle was left in an advanced state of decay. After a few urban interventions inappropriate in recent decades, rehabilitation and restoration of the fortress has taken place under the auspices of the Superintendency and the Fine Arts, the building making a positive recovery. It recently completed a two-year excavation campaign (1999/2000), which has unearthed artifacts, ancient foundations and the moat.

==== Passano ====
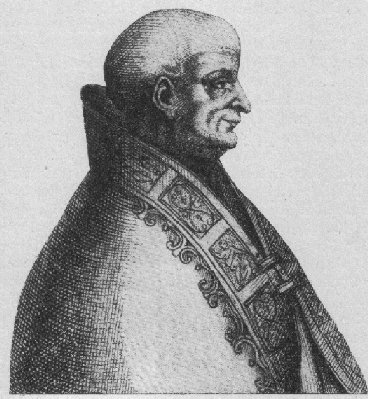
Imagine of Pope Lucius II

Castrum Passani turns out to be, from the documents found, the oldest building in the town: the Church of Ravenna by documentation that was granted by Pope Lucius II to the Church of Rimini in 1141. It then passed into the hands of the Municipality of Rimini and later, in 1361, the family Malatesta, this assignment is probably framed with a view to those made by the Pope as a result of the contribution made by the Malatesta to Papal army in the conquest of Forlì (1359) and Bologna (1360). In 1363 a papal bull of Urban V prolonging the vicarages of Malatesta, in favor of Malatesto Antico, and Galeotto, by descent, of Pandolfo Malatesta Ungaro II. Later the castle belonged, and Sigismondo Pandolfo Malatesta, and after his son Roberto. The castle stood on the hill that overlooked the pass of the Rio Furnaces, where in past years has been built using the remains of a building fortresses: here you can still see the foundation and the foundation walls.

==== Vecciano ====
Vecciano in 1371 was registered as a "Villa". Today, a farmhouse built on the foundations of the fortress, which still retains the basement. When, in 1352, was elected Pope, Innocent VI decided to bring order and discipline in religious orders and in the territories of the Church, particularly those of Romagna. This task was called the Cardinal Albornoz. Until then, the lands of the Romagna were subject to arbitrary Manfredi (Faenza), the Ordelaffi (Forlì), Galeotto and Malatesta (Rimini). In 1351 the Malatesta were excommunicated and already one year after a papal army marched against them and defeated them in Paterno (Marche), Rimini was placed under siege. The Malatesta asked forgiveness from the Pope and allied themselves with the forces of Cardinal Albornoz to defeat Manfredi and Ordelaffi. In the same year (1355) Castrum Viciani rebelled in Rimini, to submit to the Holy See in 1358 Pope Innocent VI granted it to the Malatesta.

==== Monte Tauro ====
Castrum Montis Tauri, since 1200 belongs to the Municipality of Rimini, outside the jurisdiction of the archbishops of Ravenna. The little information we have regarding the ownership of the castle of the Malatesta family before and after the Venetians (1503). The castle was built on the hill overlooking the course of Marano, had been built on the ruins of some buildings, now disappeared.

==== Mulazzano ====
As Mount Taurus, even Mulatière Castrum was owned by the Municipality of Rimini, not of the archbishops of Ravenna. Part of its history it has in common with the events of Vecciano: for the same reason in 1355 he submitted to the Holy See, which in 1358, at the hands of Innocent VI gave it to Galeotto Malatesta. The property remained until 1468 when the Malatesta, the death of Sigismondo Pandolfo Malatesta, was occupied by Federico da Montefeltro. For a short time passed to Alessandro Sforza, to Montefeltro and then return as early as 1469. The Malatesta, in the person of Roberto Malatesta, tried in vain to seize the castle, but he remained the Montefeltro. In early 1500 the castle passed into the hands of the Venetians, dating to this period the description of the administrator who made the Venetian Malipiero "high wall of the castle circundato steps 9, has had 4 wide passes, turn switch 150. It has a door. ". Malatesta and was succeeded by the Venetians in 1517 was captured and sacked by the new ruler of the Duchy of Urbino, Francesco Maria della Rovere.

==== Cerasolo ====
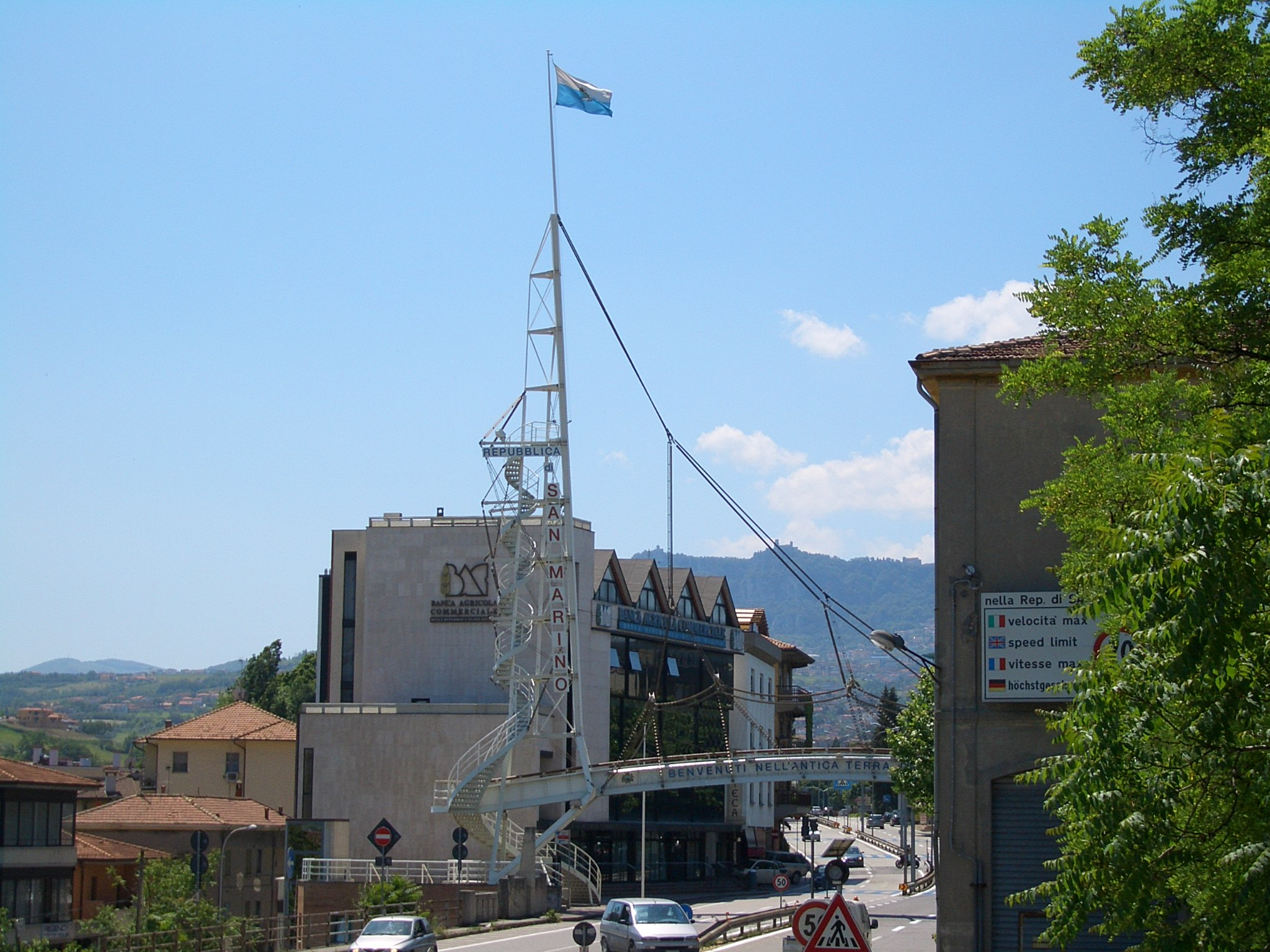
Border of San Marino view from the frazione Cerasolo

The castle Cerasolo was outside the jurisdiction of the archbishops of Ravenna, and belonged to the Municipality of Rimini. The construction of Castrum Ceresolo dates back to 1200 and its first two decades of the events of 1300 are related to the wars between the Guelphs (headed by Pandolfo Malatesta) and Ghibellines (the Counts of Montefeltro). The crashes are a constant succession of assaults, destruction and retaliation: the Ghibellines who were able to conquer and completely destroy the castle. The reconstruction was the work of Galeotto Malatesta in 1380, remained the property of the Malatesta family until 1469, when it was occupied by the Holy See, and then by Federico da Montefeltro. In 1504 the castle was occupied by the Venetians, and the superintendent Malipiero gives us this description: "Castle 4 miles away from Arimino which is in the hills, circunda high wall of step 8, without it, turn switch 110, in which poor habita 3 huomini in time of peace, of which there is a vice-captain. In time of war. homini all of his if the lurisdictione reduno in that. It has a door.. " Today there are visible remains of the old building, built in houses built later, resting on the remaining walls.

==== Besanigo ====
Besanigo, known as Tumba de St.Andrew, was built by Sigismondo Pandolfo Malatesta in 1430. At his death passed to his son Roberto (1468). In early 1500 it was occupied by the Venetians, the Montefeltro and then finally by the Municipality of Rimini. In 1517, the same occasion when he was sacked Mulazzano, was conquered and destroyed by Francesco Maria della Rovere. They are still visible today, the imposing remains of the walls.

== Main sights ==
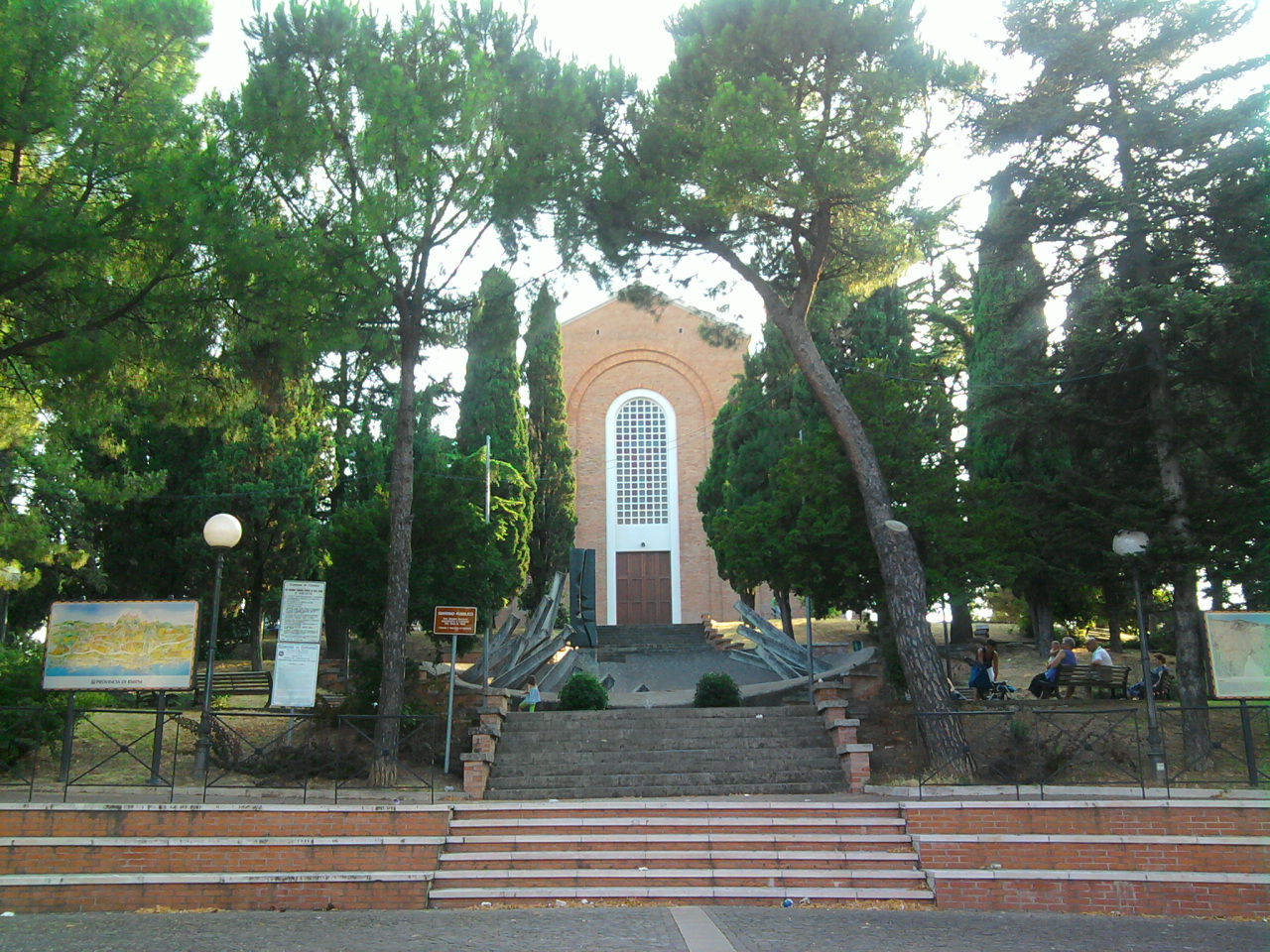
The Church of Santa Maria Assunta

- Convent of Maestre Pie dell'Addolorata. It was built in 1839 by Sister Elisabetta Renzi, she gave birth to the new religious order focused on education young women. At the church lie the remains of the Blessed Renzi same.
- Coriano Ridge War Cemetery. Constructed in April 1945 on the road between Rimini and Coriano, and managed by the Commonwealth War Graves Commission, the cemetery numbers 1,939 burials, of which 1,413 are British, of Allied soldiers who died in the advance through the Valconca and the battles of Coriano and Rimini.
- Church of Santa Maria Assunta. Massive construction commenced after the disastrous bombing of the Second World War in Coriano, and inaugurated in 1956. The external structure includes a large dome and a bell tower of 47 metres (154 ft) high. On 27 October 2011, the Church attracted the world's attention as the venue for Marco Simoncelli's funeral, who died four days previously on 23 October during a motorcycle race.

== Frazioni ==
- Coriano (in there: Pedrolara and Passano)
- Sant'Andrea in Besanigo (in there: Puglie)
- Ospedaletto (in there: Pian della Pieve, San Patrignano, Fienile, Monte Tauro, Vecciano, Vallecchio, Cavallino)
- Cerasolo (in there: Cerasolo Ausa)
- Mulazzano.

== Immigration ==
- Demographic Statistics

- Number of immigrants at 2009 (the first five for nationality)
  - Albania: 97
  - Romania: 93
  - Macedonia: 78
  - Morocco: 71
  - Tunisia: 49

== Notable people ==
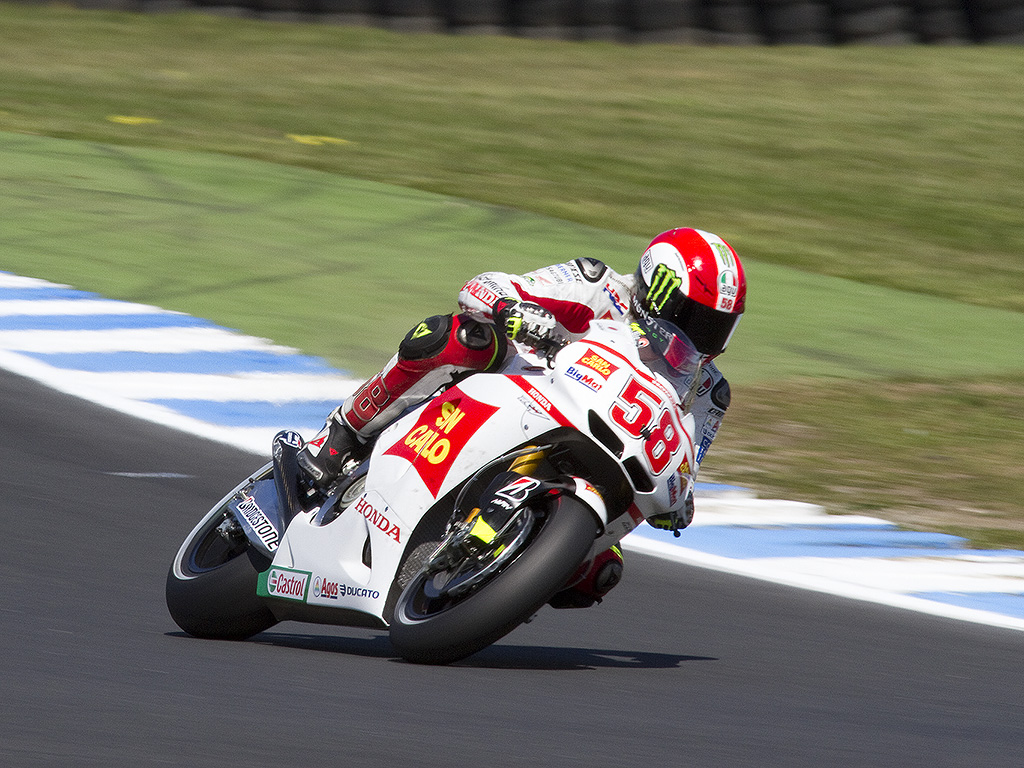
Marco Simoncelli at the 2011 Australian Grand Prix at Phillip Island

Marco Simoncelli (1987–2011), the former MotoGP motorcyclist, was brought up in Coriano. The town's sports area has been named "Palazzetto dello Sport Marco Simoncelli" in his honour.

== Gallery ==
Position of Coriano in the Province of Rimini

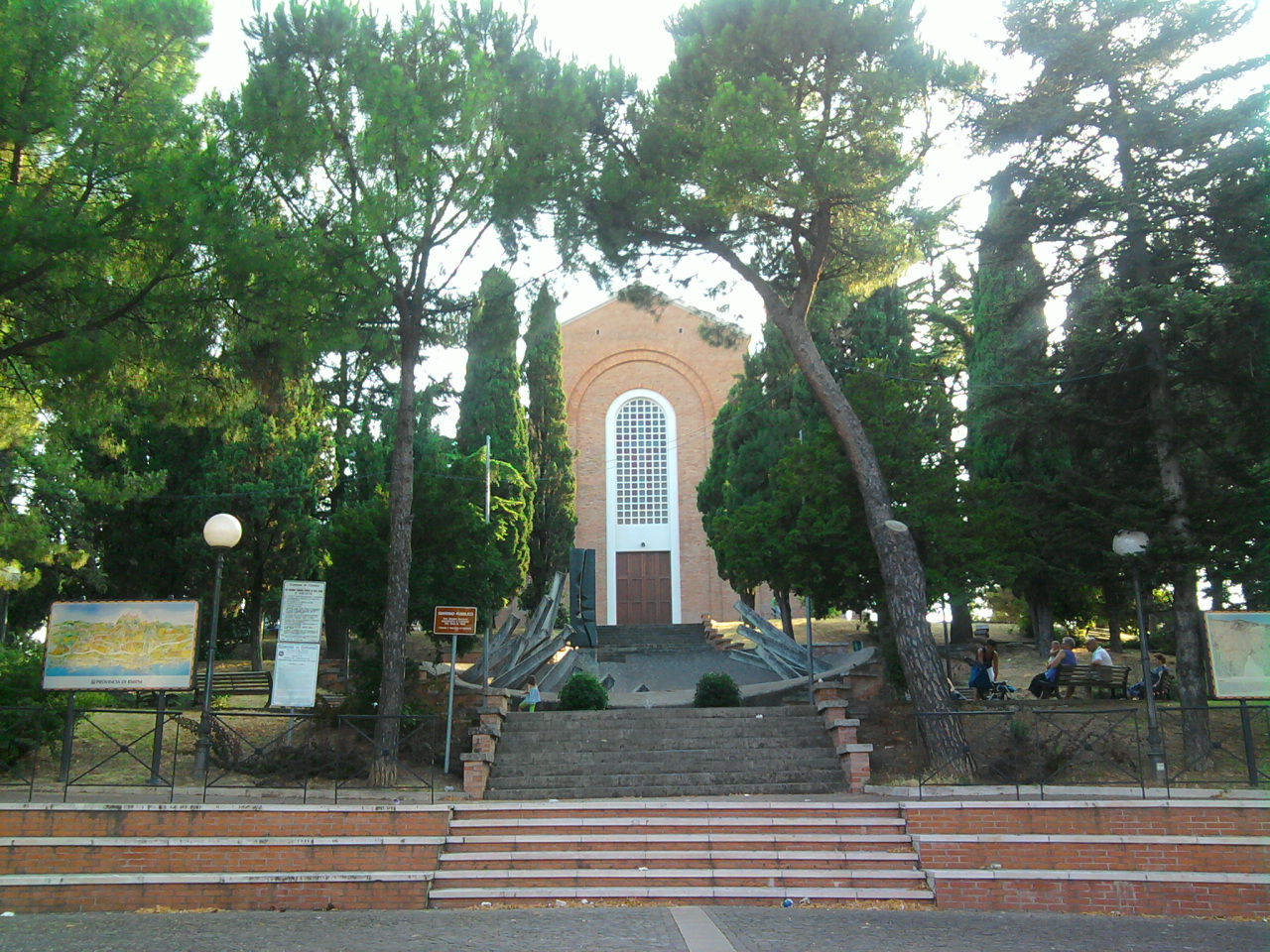
Church of Santa Maria Assunta

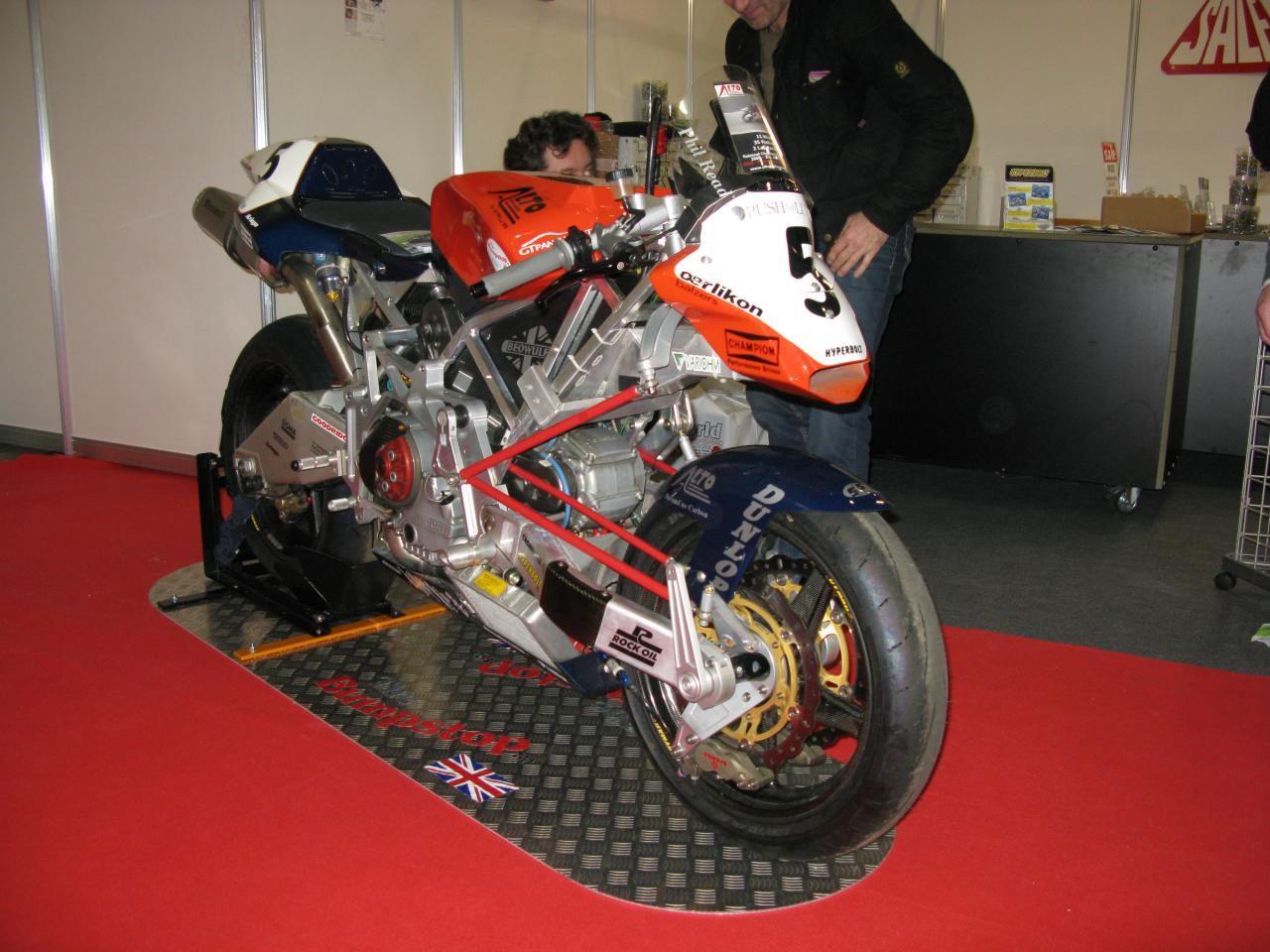
Vyrus, the factory is based in Coriano
