= Torraccia Airfield =

General aviation aerodrome in San Marino

Toraccia Helipad and Airfield Aviosuperficie ed elisuperficie di Torraccia
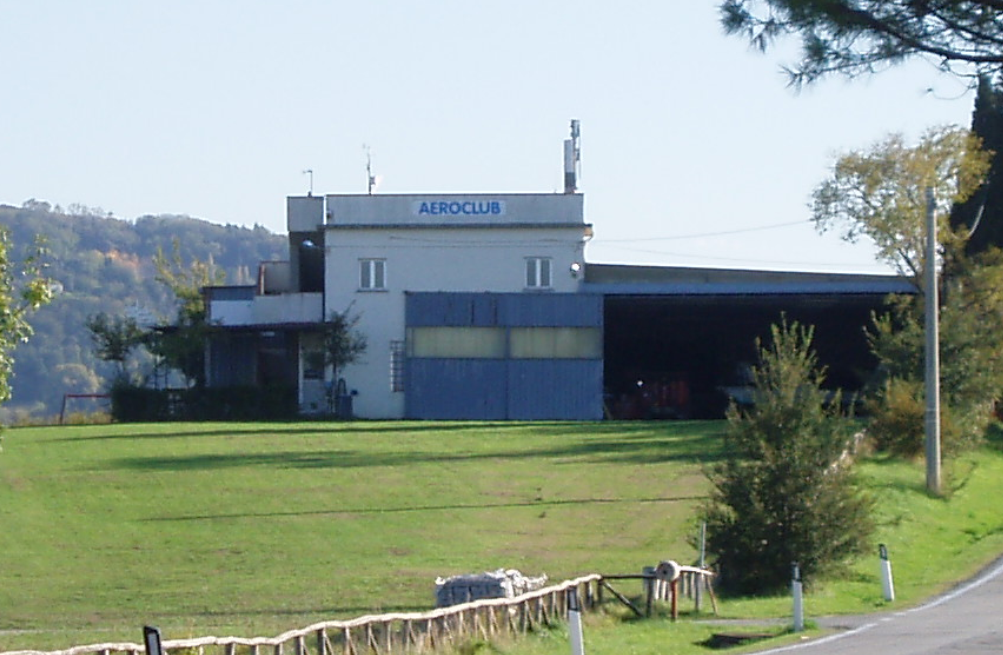
- Aeroclub San Marino's hangar, November 2006
- IATA: none; ICAO: LIKD

Summary
- Airport type: Private
- Owner: Government of San Marino
- Operator: Aeroclub San Marino
- Serves: San Marino
- Location: Torraccia, San Marino
- Opened: 1985; 41 years ago
- Time zone: CET (UTC+01:00)
  - Summer (DST): CEST (UTC+02:00)
- Elevation AMSL: 240 m (790 ft)
- Coordinates: 43°57′00″N 12°30′40″E
- Website: aeroclubsanmarino.com
- Interactive map of Toraccia Helipad and Airfield

Runways
| Direction | Length | | Surface |
| Direction | m | ft | Surface |
|---|---|---|---|
| 16/34 | 650 | 2,130 | Grass |

Helipads
| Number | Length | | Surface |
| Number | m | ft | Surface |
|---|---|---|---|
H1

Torraccia Airfield (Italian: Aviosuperficie di Torraccia), also known as Toraccia Helipad and Airfield (Italian: Aviosuperficie ed elisuperficie di Torraccia) or Toraccia Airport (Italian: Aeroporto di Torraccia), is a small general aviation aerodrome in Torraccia, a village east of the castello of Domagnano, Republic of San Marino, less than 200 metres (660 feet) from the Italian border.

Torraccia is the only airfield in San Marino. Its only grass runway was first used in 1981, but the airfield's structure was opened in 1985. In July 2012, the runway was extended to 650 metres (2,130 feet).

The airfield is operated by Aeroclub San Marino, a flying club with approximately 100 members. In the summer, between ten and fifteen planes typically land at the airfield per day. The airfield hosts a flight school, recreational flights and sports, and some tourist flights in small aircraft. The Government of San Marino owns the land.

Torraccia's past users have included Pope Benedict XVI and the Frecce Tricolori, who, since 2014, have organised an annual sightseeing flight for children with disabilities over San Marino and the Province of Rimini. The airfield is also used for historic automobile exhibitions.

== History ==
Prior to the airfield's construction, San Marino's only heliport was next to Borgo Maggiore's cablecar terminus, which inaugurated its first postal flights in 1950. From 1961, Compagnia Italiana Elicotteri operated several daily flights from Borgo Maggiore to Rimini and, from 1964, to San Leo. The service closed in 1969, and the heliport has since been replaced by a parking lot.

Torraccia's runway was built in 1981, but the airfield's structure was opened in 1985. The maiden flight was a postal flight to Italy. Aeroclub San Marino was founded in 1985, and its flight school opened in 1986.

On 19 June 2011, Pope Benedict XVI landed at Torraccia's helipad on a pastoral visit to the Diocese of San Marino-Montefeltro.

Between May and July 2012, the runway was extended to its present length of 650 metres (2,130 feet), accentuating its slope. The extension added approximately 200 metres (660 feet), at a cost of 450,000 euros. In February 2013, the Sammarinese government was grappling with a civil case by landowners seeking higher compensation for the land that was expropriated to extend the runway.

== Features ==
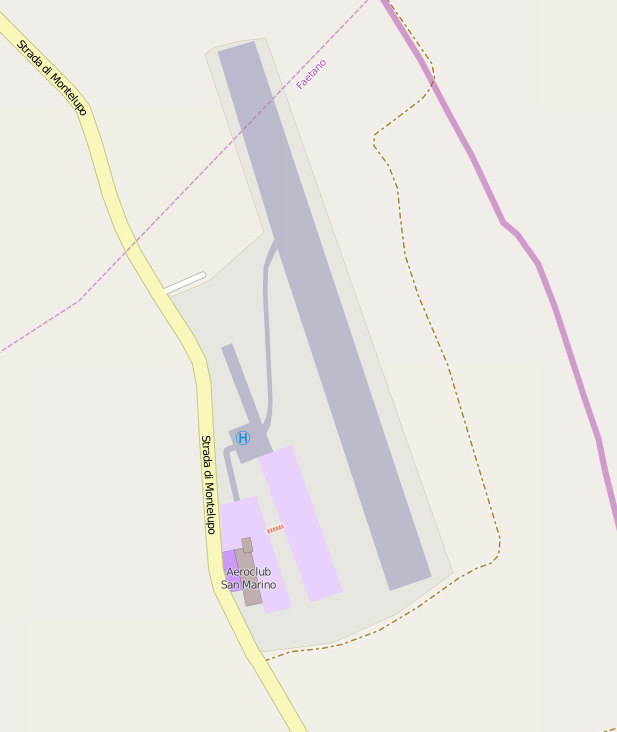
Map of the airfield

Torracia has one 650-metre (2,130-foot) grass runway, which has a 16-34 orientation. The airfield is located 240 metres (790 feet) above mean sea level.

Due to the sloping terrain, the preferred orientation is runway 16 for takeoffs and runway 34 for landings. A circuit leads up to the runway to the airfield's east, over Italy. The runway's difficulty requires pilots to have made five takeoffs and landings within the past 90 days, and to have made at least five takeoff from small Italian airfields.

The airfield has no customs and border control facilities, and departures and arrivals are only allowed to countries in the Schengen Area. Italy does not recognise the validity of ultralight pilot certificates issued by San Marino, and Sammarinese aircraft must be authorised by the Aero Club d'Italia to circulate in Italian skies for up to 90 days.

== Future expansion ==
The Sammarinese government has expressed interest in extending Torraccia's runway, to a maximum of 950 metres (3,120 feet). The extension is opposed by local residents. Such an extension would require repositioning the runway to avoid entering Italian territory, and could allow shuttle flights to Federico Fellini International Airport, San Marino's closest international airport in the Miramare frazione of Rimini, only 20 minutes drive from the border.

In autumn 2023, the Sammarinese government allocated 3.9 million euros for the fencing of the airfield and the asphalting of its runway.

In September 2023, the Saudi Arabian government signed a letter of intent to invest 29 million dollars into the airfield's expansion. On 28 October 2023, over 100 Sammarinese citizens formed the Torraccia Civic Committee to oppose the airfield's expansion, citing concerns over safety, local health, the environment, and the expansion's public cost. On 27 December 2023, it was confirmed that the Saudi loan had been approved by both governments.

On 8 February 2024, the Government of San Marino, who owns the land, issued an international notice to invite expressions of interest for potential concessionaires to develop the airfield for "business aviation, general and tourist aviation, as well as to build a base for the landing of general aviation helicopters". The notice declared that the airfield's development was "of strategic importance for the improvement and enhancement of the services offered" towards "repositioning San Marino as a tourist destination at an international level".

== Incidents ==
A 2009 memorandum of understanding between Italy's National Agency for Flight Safety and San Marino's Civil Aviation and Maritime Navigation Authority means that technical investigations of incidents in Torraccia are conducted by Italy's agency.

In July 2007, an ultralight aircraft carrying Italian tourists, arriving from Castiglione del Lago, fell off the runway during an attempt to abort a landing with strong winds. The pilot, who was landing without warning, was unfamiliar with the airfield. His wife sustained light injuries.

On 11 June 2010, a Cessna 172 (registered I-SVFD) from Aeroclub Fano did not stop at the end of runway 34 after a failure in its braking system and a gust of wind from the south-west. The aircraft's two occupants were injured, and the aircraft was completely destroyed after catching fire.

On 22 May 2017, a Cessna 172 (F-HAPT) of French Aéroclub Paul Tissandier flipped over on the runway during landing. The aircraft's two occupants were lightly injured, but the aircraft was severely damaged.

== See also ==
- Federico Fellini International Airport
