= 5th Army Aviation Regiment "Rigel" =

Active Italian Army attack helicopter unit

- 5° Reggimento Aviazione dell'Esercito "Rigel"
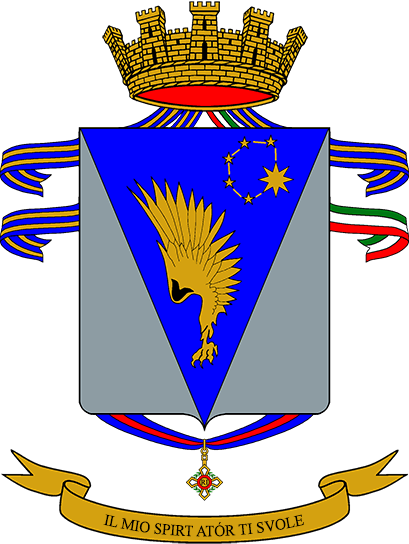
- Regimental coat of arms highlighting Rigel within the constellation Orion
- Active: 1 Jan. 1976 — today
- Country: Italy
- Branch: Italian Army
- Type: Army Aviation
- Part of: Airmobile Brigade "Friuli"
- Garrison/HQ: Casarsa Airport
- Motto: "Il mio spirt atôr ti svole"
- Anniversaries: 10 May 1953 - Founding of the Italian Army Aviation
- Decorations: 1× Military Order of Italy; 2× Silver Medals of Army Valor; 1× Bronze Medal of Army Valor; 1× Silver Medal of Civil Valor

Insignia
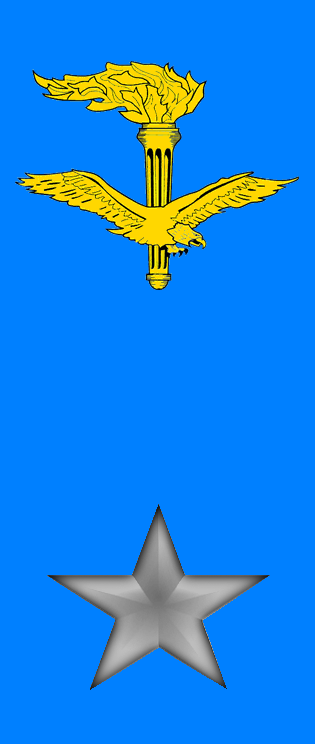
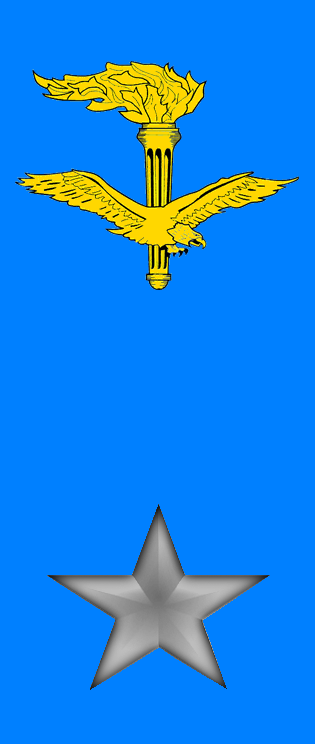
- Army Aviation gorget patches

The 5th Army Aviation Regiment "Rigel" (Italian: 5° Reggimento Aviazione dell'Esercito "Rigel") is an Italian Army regiment based at Casarsa Airport in Friuli-Venezia Giulia. The regiment is part of the army aviation and assigned to the Airmobile Brigade "Friuli". Formed in 1976 as support unit of the V Army Corps the regiment is the oldest and highest decorated Italian aviation regiment. The regiment, together with the 7th Army Aviation Regiment "Vega", constitutes the Italian Army's combat aviation and tactical lift capability. The regiment's anniversary falls, as for all Italian Army aviation units, on 10 May 1953, the day the aviation speciality was founded.

== History ==
On 1 February 1956, the Experimental Helicopters Unit was formed in Casarsa and assigned to the V Army Corps. On 1 July 1957, the Experimental Helicopters Unit was renamed I Helicopters Unit and, on 1 February 1963, it was renumbered as V Helicopters Unit. On the same date the light aircraft units of the 182nd Armored Infantry Regiment "Garibaldi" and the 33rd Field Artillery Regiment were merged to form the V Light Aviation Unit, which was based at the time at the Vittorio Veneto Airfield. In 1970, the V Helicopters Unit was renamed V General Use Helicopters Unit.

=== Formation ===
During the 1975 Army reform the army reorganized its aviation units and for the first time created aviation units above battalion level. On 1 January 1976, the 5th Army Light Aviation Grouping "Rigel" was formed at Casarsa Airport and took command of the following aviation units of the V Army Corps:

- V Light Aviation Unit, which was renamed: 25th Army Light Aviation Squadrons Group "Cigno"
- V General Use Helicopters Unit, which was renamed: 55th Multirole Helicopters Squadrons Group "Dragone"

From 1 June 1976, the grouping was organized as follows:

- 5th Army Light Aviation Grouping "Rigel", at Casarsa Airport
  - 25th Army Light Aviation Squadrons Group "Cigno", at Vittorio Veneto Airfield
    - Command and Services Squadron
    - 251st Light Airplanes Squadron (SM.1019A planes)
    - 425th Reconnaissance Helicopters Squadron (AB 206 helicopters)
  - 55th Multirole Helicopters Squadrons Group "Dragone", at Casarsa Airport
    - Command and Services Squadron
    - 551st Multirole Helicopters Squadron (AB 204B & AB 205 helicopters)
    - 552nd Multirole Helicopters Squadron (AB 204B & AB 205 helicopters)
    - 553rd Multirole Helicopters Squadron (AB 204B & AB 205 helicopters)
    - 554th Multirole Helicopters Squadron (AB 204B & AB 205 helicopters)

The plan to form an Attack Helicopters Squadrons Group for the grouping with four squadrons and a total of 24 attack helicopters was canceled due to funding issues.

=== Naming ===
Since the 1975 army reform Italian army aviation units are named for celestial objects: groupings, and later regiments, are numbered with a single digit and named for stars in the 88 modern constellations. Accordingly, an army aviation regiment's coat of arms highlights the name-giving star within its constellation. Squadron groups were numbered with two digits and named for constellations, or planets of the Solar System. The 5th Army Light Aviation Grouping was named for Rigel, which is the brightest star in the constellation Orion. In 1996, the Italian Army formed army aviation support regiments, which were named to reflect the aviation regiment they supported. Consequently, the army aviation support regiment supporting the 5th Army Aviation Regiment "Rigel" was named 2nd Army Aviation Support Regiment "Orione".

On 14 March 1977, the President of the Italian Republic Giovanni Leone granted with decree 173 the grouping a flag. Since then one Military Order of Italy, a Silver Medal of Army Valor for the grouping's service after the 1976 Friuli earthquake, a Silver Medal of Army Valor for the regiment's service during the early stages of the Yugoslav Wars, and a Silver Medal of Civil Valor for the regiment's mountain rescue service in the Julian Alps, have been awarded to the regiment. These awards have been affixed, together with the Bronze Medal of Army Valor awarded to the 49th Reconnaissance Helicopters Squadrons Group "Capricorno" for its services after the 1976 Friuli earthquake, to the regiment's flag and are depicted on the regiment's coat of arms.

=== Cold War ===
On 30 November 1985, the 25th Army Light Aviation Squadrons Group "Cigno" at Vittorio Veneto Airfield and the 47th Reconnaissance Helicopters Squadrons Group "Levrieri" at Prosecco Airfield were disbanded. The next day the 48th Reconnaissance Helicopters Squadrons Group "Pavone" at Campoformido Airport was renamed 25th Reconnaissance Helicopters Squadrons Group "Cigno" and transferred from the Mechanized Division "Mantova" to the 5th Army Light Aviation Grouping "Rigel". On the same day, the 49th Reconnaissance Helicopters Squadrons Group "Capricorno" of the Armored Division "Ariete" joined the grouping and the airfield at Prosecco was assigned to the grouping as a secondary base. The personnel and materiel of the disbanded squadron groups was integrated into the remaining units of the grouping.

In 1989, the last AB 204B helicopters were retired. On 6 October 1991, the 5th Army Light Aviation Grouping "Rigel" was renamed 5th Army Light Aviation Regiment "Rigel". At the time the regiment was organized as follows:

- 5th Army Light Aviation Regiment "Rigel", at Casarsa Airport
  - 25th Reconnaissance Helicopters Squadrons Group "Cigno", at Campoformido Airport
    - Command and Services Squadron
    - 481st Reconnaissance Helicopters Squadron (AB 206 & A109 helicopters)
    - 482nd Reconnaissance Helicopters Squadron (AB 206 & A109 helicopters)
  - 49th Reconnaissance Helicopters Squadrons Group "Capricorno", at Casarsa Airport
    - Command and Services Squadron
    - 491st Reconnaissance Helicopters Squadron (AB 206 & A109 helicopters)
    - 492nd Reconnaissance Helicopters Squadron (AB 206 & A109 helicopters)
  - 55th Multirole Helicopters Squadrons Group "Dragone", at Casarsa Airport
    - Command and Services Squadron
    - 551st Multirole Helicopters Squadron (AB 205 helicopters)
    - 552nd Multirole Helicopters Squadron (AB 205 helicopters)
    - 553rd Multirole Helicopters Squadron (AB 205 helicopters)
    - 554th Multirole Helicopters Squadron (AB 205 helicopters)

=== Recent times ===
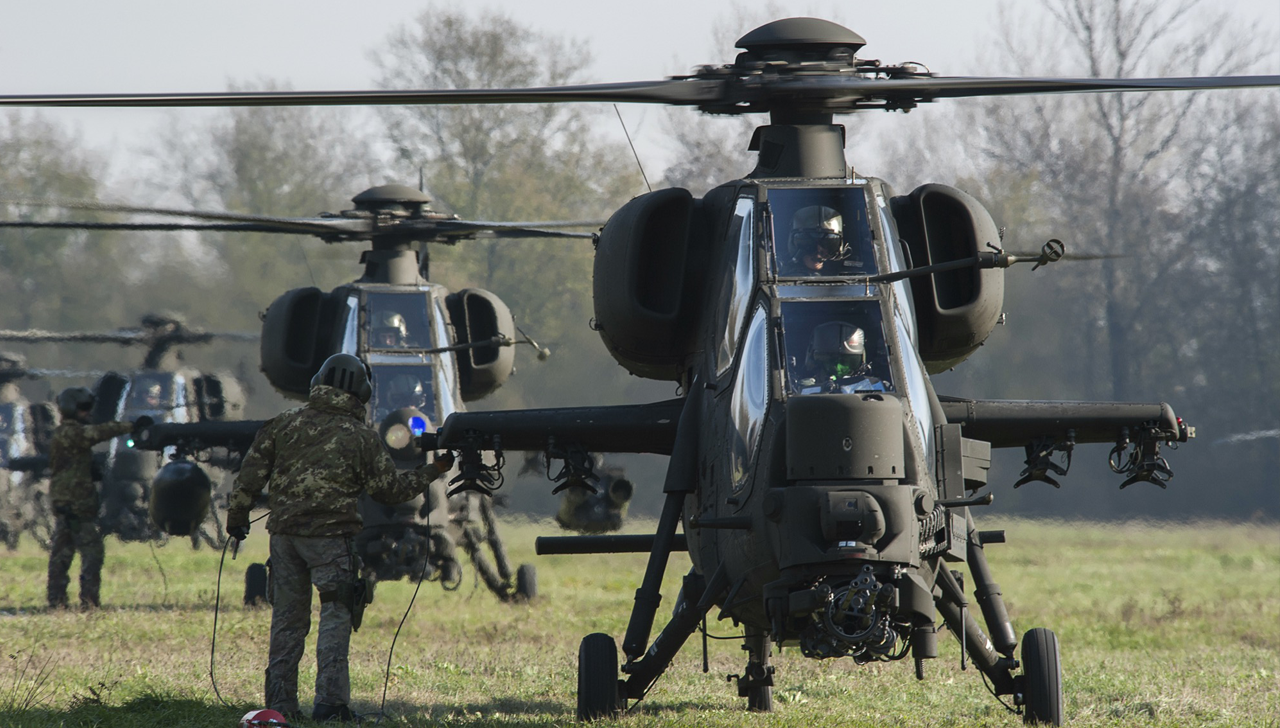
5th Army Aviation Regiment "Rigel" A129D Mangusta attack helicopters

On 7 January 1992, two helicopters of the regiment were attacked and one shot down by two Yugoslav Air Force MiG-21 fighter jets near Podrute in Croatia. The attack resulted in the death of four members of the regiment and one French officer.

In 1992, the regiment began the transition from AB 206 helicopters to A129 Mangusta attack helicopters. Consequently, on 1 June 1992, the 49th Reconnaissance Helicopters Squadrons Group "Capricorno" was renamed 49th Attack Helicopters Squadrons Group "Capricorno". On 1 October 1992, the 55th Army Light Aviation Squadrons Group "Dragone" moved from at Casarsa Airport to Padua Airport. On 12 June 1993, the regiment was renamed 5th Army Aviation Regiment "Rigel". On 31 December 1995, the secondary base at Prosecco Airfield was closed.

On 5 July 1996, the 7th Attack Helicopters Regiment "Vega" was formed at Casarsa Airport. On the same day, the 5th Army Aviation Regiment "Rigel" moved its headquarter from Casarsa Airport to Campoformido Airport and transferred the 49th Attack Helicopters Squadrons Group "Capricorno" to the new regiment. Furthermore, on the same day the 55th Army Aviation Squadrons Group "Dragone" was transferred to the Aviation Command of the Northwestern Military Region.

On 1 October 1997, the 5th Army Aviation Regiment "Rigel" was transferred from the V Army Corps and to the Army Aviation Inspectorate. On 1 September 1998, the 5th Army Aviation Regiment "Rigel", the 25th Army Aviation Squadrons Group "Cigno", the 48th Attack Helicopters Squadrons Group "Pavone", which had been ceded by the 7th Attack Helicopters Regiment "Vega", and the 53rd Army Aviation Squadrons Group "Cassiopeia", which had been ceded by the 3rd Army Aviation Regiment "Aldebaran", moved to the Italian Air Force's former Miramare Air Base near Rimini. On 23 October of the same year, the 5th Army Aviation Regiment "Rigel" and 7th Army Aviation Regiment "Vega" swapped name and flags. The 5th Army Aviation Regiment "Rigel" was now again based at its traditional base at the Casarsa Airport.

On 1 June 1999, the Army Aviation was assigned to the Italian Army's Cavalry Arm as a speciality of the arm. Consequently, the 5th Army Aviation Regiment "Rigel" was renamed 5th Air Cavalry Regiment "Rigel". On 1 May 2000, the 5th Air Cavalry Aviation Regiment "Rigel" was transferred from the Army Aviation Inspectorate to the Airmobile Brigade "Friuli". On 3 November 2003, the Air Cavalry left the Italian Army's Cavalry Arm and became, as Army Aviation Specialty, a separate speciality of the Italian Army. Consequently, the 5th Air Cavalry Regiment "Rigel" was renamed 5th Army Aviation Regiment "Rigel".

In 2008, the regiment began the transition from AB 205 helicopters to NH90 helicopters, which was completed by 2017.

== Organization ==
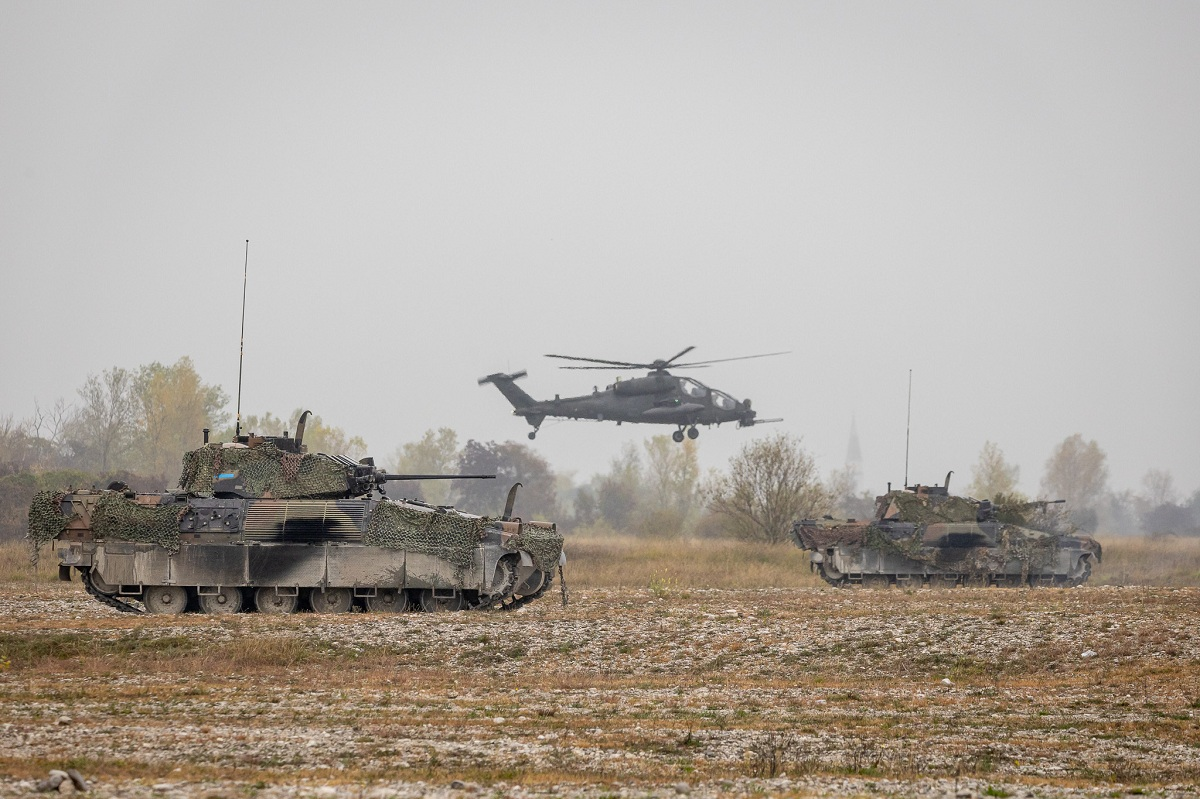
5th Army Aviation Regiment "Rigel" A129 Mangusta attack helicopter and 11th Bersaglieri Regiment Dardo infantry fighting vehicles during exercise Demetra 2/25

As of 2024 the 5th Army Aviation Regiment "Rigel" is organized as follows:

- 5th Army Aviation Regiment "Rigel", at Casarsa Airport
  - Headquarters Unit
  - 27th Squadrons Group "Mercurio"
    - 271st Combat Support Helicopters Squadron
    - 272nd Combat Support Helicopters Squadron
    - 273rd Combat Support Helicopters Squadron
  - 49th Squadrons Group "Capricorno"
    - 491st Attack Helicopters Squadron
    - 492nd Attack Helicopters Squadron
    - 493rd Attack Helicopters Squadron
  - Support Squadrons Group "Lupo"
    - Logistic Support Squadron
    - Aircraft Maintenance Squadron

== Equipment ==
The 27th Squadrons Group "Mercurio" is equipped with NH90 transport helicopters and the 49th Squadrons Group "Capricorno" with A129D Mangusta attack helicopters, which will be replaced by AW249 Fenice attack helicopters.

== See also ==
- Army Aviation
