= Miramare di Rimini =

Suburb of Rimini, Italy

Miramare
- Frazione of Rimini
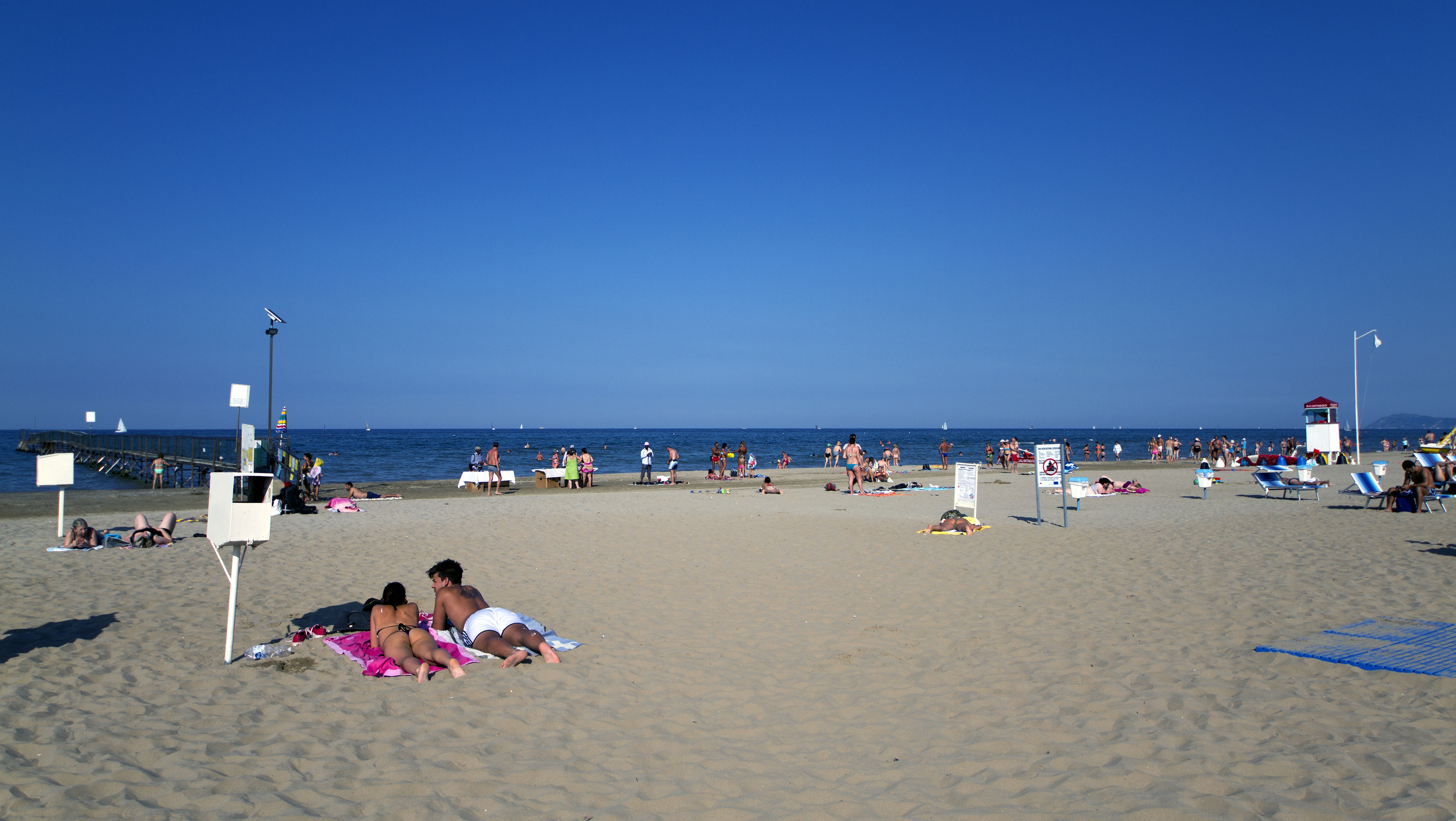
- Miramare beach, June 2015
- Etymology: lit. 'sea view' (from Italian)
- Nickname: Il Terzo (The Third)
- Interactive map of Miramare
- Coordinates: 44.0302°N 12.6183°E
- Country: Italy
- Region: Emilia-Romagna
- Province: Rimini
- Comune: Rimini

Population (c. 2014)
  - Total: 8,000
- Time zone: UTC+1 (CET)
  - Summer (DST): UTC+2 (CEST)
- Postal code: 47924

Miramare di Rimini, more commonly known simply as Miramare, is the southernmost suburb and frazione of the city of Rimini, Italy. Situated on the Adriatic coast, the seaside resort lies 5 km (3.1 mi) southeast of Rimini's city centre and borders the municipality of Riccione.

Located on the Via Flaminia, now the SS16 state road, Miramare developed as a tourist destination from the early 20th century. As well as the beaches on its coastline, the suburb's recreational facilities include Fiabilandia and Altromondo Studios, among Italy's earliest amusement parks and nightclubs respectively.

The suburb is served by a minor station on the Bologna–Ancona railway, and includes Federico Fellini International Airport, the principal airport for the province of Rimini and the Republic of San Marino.

== Overview ==
Miramare is the southernmost suburb and frazione of Rimini, and is located roughly equidistant between the city centres of Rimini and Riccione. Miramare is bounded to the north by Rivazzurra and to the south by the Rio dell'Asse, a minor stream that forms Rimini's boundary with Riccione. The Adriatic Sea bounds Miramare to the east, and Federico Fellini International Airport bounds it to the west.

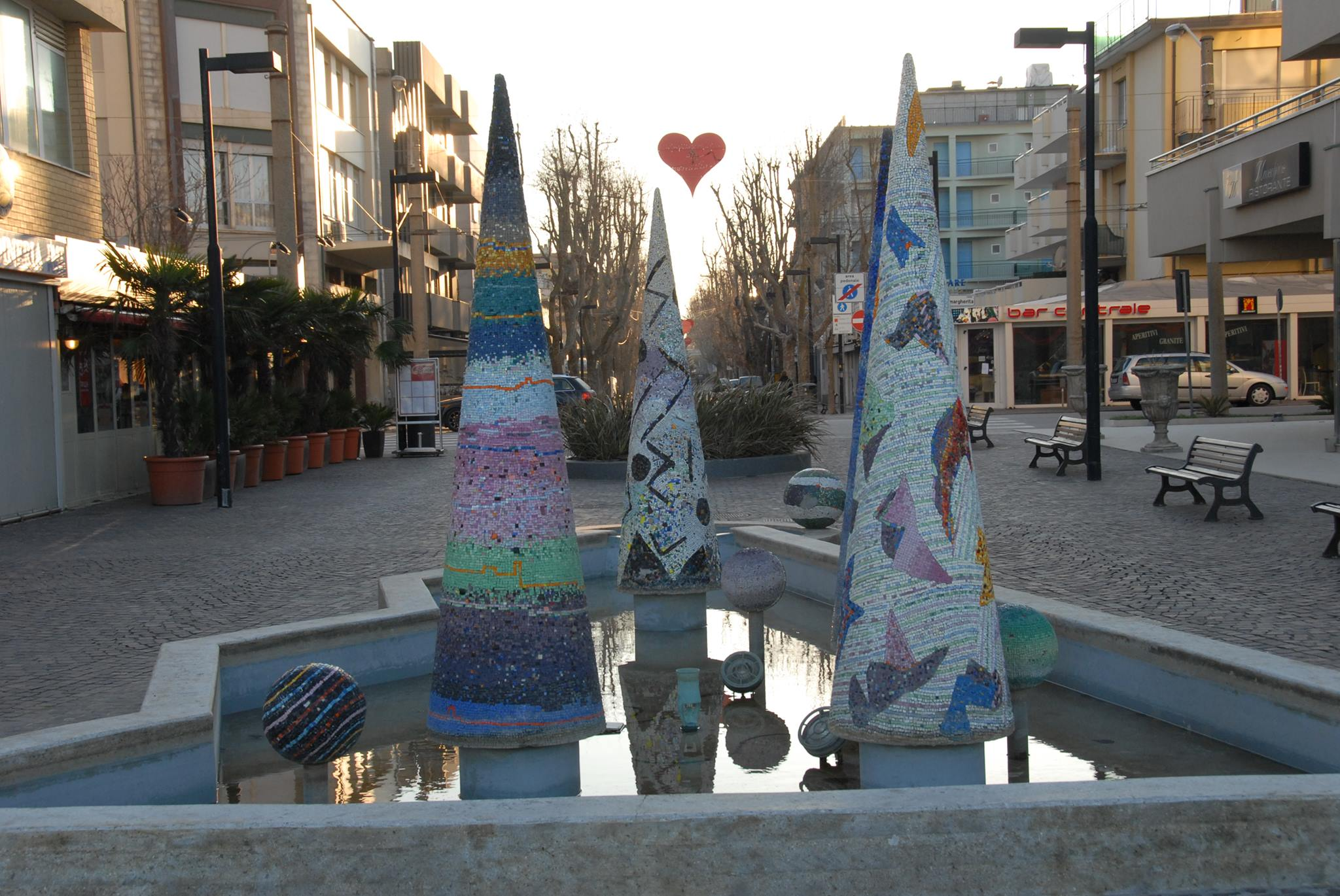
Viale Ivo Oliveti, January 2014

The suburb roughly follows a grid plan. The Bologna–Ancona railway splits the suburb into a western residential half and an eastern touristic half by the coast. The major north–south roads are, in the western half, the SS16 state road and Viale Parigi/Viale Losanna, and then, after the railway, Viale Guglielmo Marconi and Viale Principe di Piemonte, which is the principal seafront avenue. The major east–west roads are Viale Ivo Oliveti, Viale Costantinopoli/Viale Giacinto Martinelli and Via Cavalieri di Vittorio Veneto. The latter two roads pass underneath the railway, while Viale Ivo Oliveti is the main shopping street and is pedestrianised in the eastern half.

The suburb is a popular tourist destination, domestically and internationally. As well as hotels, there are inexpensive hostels and camping grounds, popular among young travellers. The suburb's recreational facilities include shops, restaurants, bars, nightclubs, go-kart tracks, beachside sports courts, and arcades. Particularly noteworthy is the Altro Mondo Studios nightclub.

== History ==
=== Roman era ===
The site of the present-day Miramare is located on the Via Flaminia, a Roman road constructed by Gaius Flaminius during his censorship in 220 BCE. The Via Flaminia was the main artery from Rome leading north of the Apennines and to the Adriatic Sea. Miramare was three Roman miles south of the road's northern end in Ariminum (Rimini). Even in the 20th century, the neighbourhood was sometimes nicknamed Il Terzo (The Third). A milestone in Miramare dates to the road's construction. In 2013, excavations for a pedestrian underpass next to it uncovered a section of the Via Flaminia, which was between 12 m (39 ft) and 15 m (49 ft) wide.

=== Modern development ===
Settlement in Miramare began in the early 20th century as the beaches of Rimini and Riccione began to attract tourists. In the late eighteenth century, Sebastiano Amati, a businessman and councillor who would play a pivotal role in Riccione's expansion and independence from Rimini, proposed the idea of a coastal road linking Rimini and Riccione.

By 1905, the development and settlement of Miramare began; the modern hospital was constructed north of Miramare, and numerous hotels were built along the coast between Rimini and Riccione.

In 1921, Domenico Masi, a priest from San Clemente, began ministering to the nascent settlement at Miramare. Masi built a church, orphanage, carpentry shop, tile factory, and several retreat houses. In July 1925, the matron to whom Masi entrusted the orphanage was recalled, and so on 8 December 1925, the orphanage came under the care of a new religious institute founded in Miramare, the Congregation of the "Sisters of the Immaculate". Miramare remains the motherhouse of the Sisters of the Immaculate, who regard Masi as their founder and also run a seaside retreat home, kindergarten, and nursing clinic in the neighbourhood. Viale Don Domenico Masi, which houses the motherhouse, is named after Masi; it is the next street north of Viale Ivo Oliveti, to which it runs parallel. In 2012, there were 200 Sisters of the Immaculate across twenty-two houses in Italy, Venezuela, Paraguay, the Philippines, and Indonesia.

In 1923, Miramare became the border of the Municipality of Rimini after Riccione was made an independent municipality. The border between the comuni was established at the Rio dell'Asse; Rimini had unsuccessfully proposed that the border be further south at the Torrente Marano, to the disapproval of residents residing between the Rio dell'Asse and the Torrente Marano.

In 1925, a tramway from Rimini was extended to Miramare. The tramway was extended further south to Riccione in 1927, after a carriageable bridge was built over the Torrente Marano in 1924. The tramway was converted into a trolleybus line, the present-day route 11, in July 1939. On 17 August 1929, the first passenger flight landed at the aerodome west of Miramare, which would later become Federico Fellini International Airport. Miramare developed as a tourist destination during the 1930s, including with the construction of two fascist colonies. Relative to other seaside resorts in Rimini, Miramare was notable for its peace, tranquility, and greenery.

During the Battle of Rimini in the Second World War, German forces defended the aerodome with Panther turrets, barring Allied forces from advancing further up the Gothic Line along the end of the Via Flaminia. The 3rd Greek Mountain Brigade and the 18th New Zealand Armoured Regiment engaged the airport, whose defence and capture was central to the Battle of Rimini. After its capture, the airfield returned to its use as a prisoner-of-war camp, housing up to 80,000 Axis forces. The camp was lightly surveilled and both prostitution and escape were rife. Erich Priebke, a perpetrator of the Ardeatine massacre, was a notable escapee. Between 1956 and 2010, the airfield was the home of the 5th Aerobrigade of the Italian Air Force, and during the Cold War, it was identified by the Warsaw Pact as a strategic target in the event of an all-out war, housing several thousand Italian and NATO soldiers and thirty B61 nuclear bombs. Helicopters belonging to the 7th Army Aviation Regiment "Vega" remain at the airport.

In 2003, voters in a municipal referendum approved plans to build Rimini's new Palacongressi on Miramare's border. The conference space was eventually built on Via Monte Titano just outside the city centre, on the site of the old Rimini Fiera.

== Main sights ==
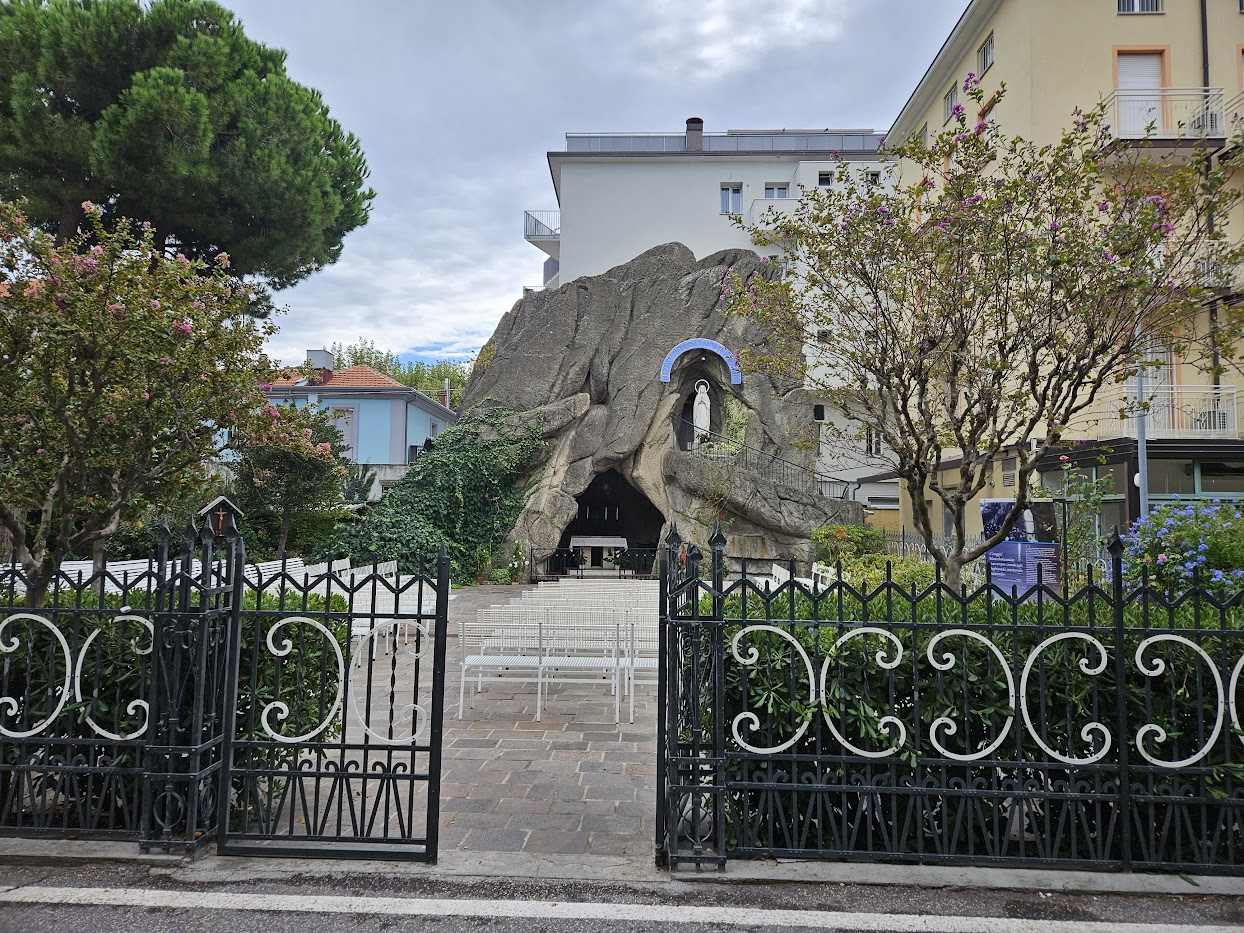
The Lourdes Grotto, September 2023

=== Religious buildings ===
- Lourdes Grotto: In 1962, two years before his death, Masi opened a lifesize reproduction of the Lourdes grotto in Miramare. The grotto is opposite the motherhouse of the Congregation of the "Sisters of the Immaculate".
- Church of the Sacred Heart of Jesus: In 1966, the parish church of the Sacred Heart of Jesus was opened on Viale Guglielmo Marconi. Miramare had been designated as a curacy from 1955, but the motherhouse of the Sisters of the Immaculate had provided the only, and increasingly crowded, place of worship in the suburb for the preceding forty years.

=== Fascist colonies ===
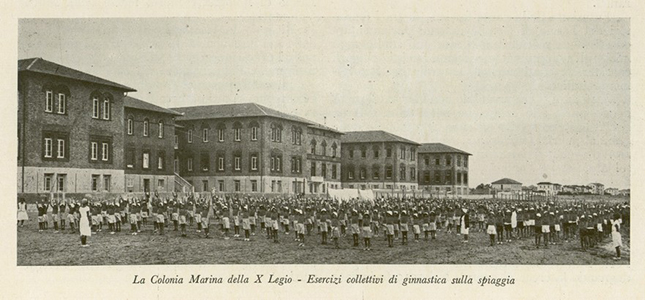
The Bolognese Colony, July 1935

Two fascist colonies were built in Miramare in the early 1930s, at a time when the coastline of the riviera romagnola was developed by Benito Mussolini, himself from Romagna. Several other colonies were built along the principal seafront avenue between Rimini and Riccione in the 1930s; the Mussolini family itself bought a summer villa in Riccione in 1934. The colonies were summer recreational facilities for children and adolescents. In Miramare, the colonies were built almost opposite each other on Viale Principe di Piemonte, the Bolognese Colony on the coastal side and the Novarese Colony on the other side of the road.

- The Bolognese Colony was built between 1931 and 1932 to the design of Ildebrando Tabarroni. During the Second World War, the Bolognese Colony was used to house refugee children from Albania and Libya, as a military hospital for veterans from Operation Barbarossa, a woman's internment camp, and an Allied prisoner-of-war camp. It reopened for children's summer camps after the Second World War. In 2022, the Bolognese Colony was bought by an investor intending to refurbish it into a hotel. The music video to La dolce vita, a pop single by Fedez, Tananai and Mara Sattei that topped the Italian charts in 2022, was filmed outside the Bolognese Colony.
- The Novarese Colony was built between 1933 and 1934 to the design of Giuseppe Peverelli. During the Second World War, the Novarese Colony was used as a military hospital and centre of military command. It reopened for children's summer camps, but after being deemed unsafe, having never been fully restored from the war damage, the Novarese Colony was converted into a camping site in 1959, remaining in use until 1975.

=== Attractions and landmarks ===
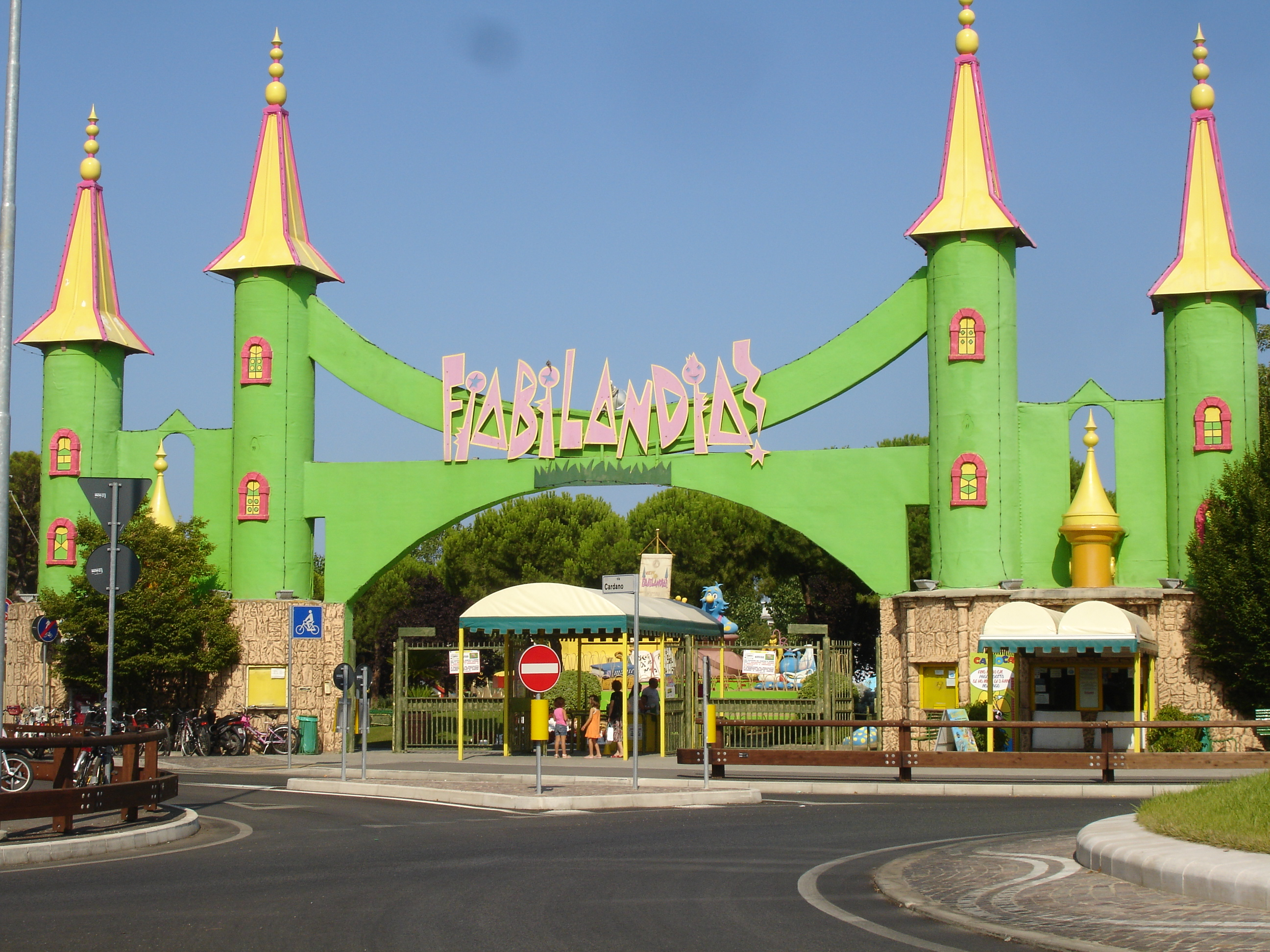
- Entrance to Fiabilandia, August 2009
  Fiabilandia: At Miramare's northern border with Rivazzurra, Fiabilandia was opened in 1965 in experimental and temporary form as one of Italy's first theme parks, alongside Città della Domenica in Perugia (opened 1963) and Edenlandia in Naples (opened 1965). The inspiration came from a businessman in Riccione, who though that the abandoned gravel pit could be transformed into an amusement park. The original fairground consisted of a few simple rides, and considered by Rimini's locals as an Americanisation of the seaside resort. The park grew under the directorship of Oriano Bizzocchi from 1974 to 1987, who took inspiration from Disney parks to add rides and rollercoasters. After reaching a peak of 500,000 visitors in 1987, the park began a slow decline, continuing for most of the 1990s. Part of the decline is attributable to the opening of Mirabilandia, Italy's largest amusement park, in Ravenna in 1992. The park survived a threat of closure in 2012. The park's area measures 150,000 square metres (1,600,000 sq ft), and its car park was the first in Europe to be entirely covered with solar panels.
- Riminiterme: In the 1970s, a thalassotherapy centre was established opposite the Novarese Colony on Viale Principe di Piemonte; in 2000, it was restructured and renamed as Riminiterme. The centre includes four swimming pools and a large gym.
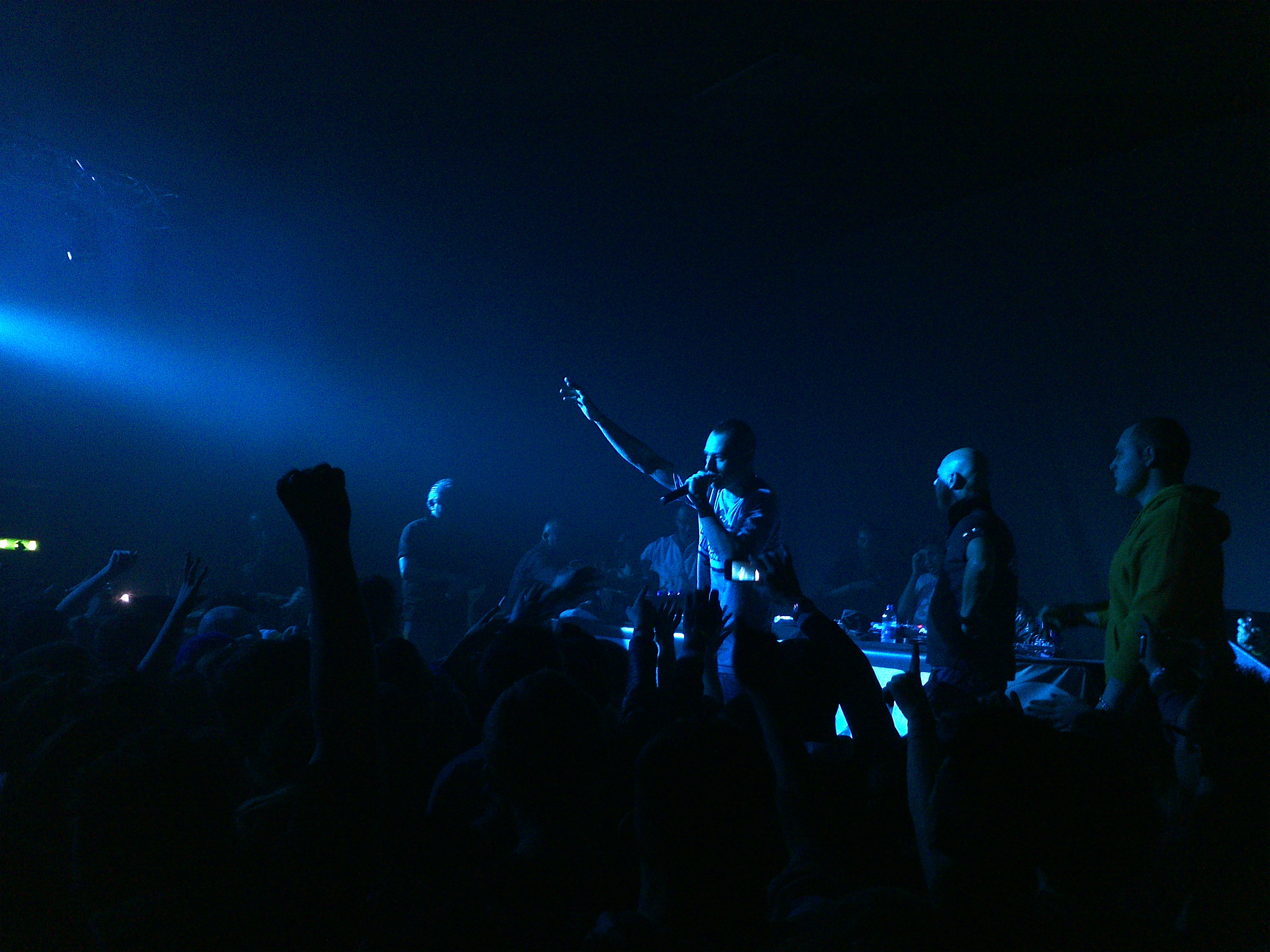
- Fabri Fibra at Altromondo Studios, December 2011
  Altromondo Studios: Located on the Via Flaminia, the nightclub was founded by Gilberto Amati in 1967. Its direction was assumed by Piero Bevitori and Guerrino Galli in 1972, whose families still own the nightclub. Altromondo was the most prominent of a series of nightclubs in Rimini and Riccione, and among the first large nightclubs in Italy, with the discjockey booth above the dance floor. Past performers at the club include Ray Charles, James Brown, Premiata Forneria Marconi, Banco del Mutuo Soccorso, The Creatures and The Rockets.
- Stronz d'Urland: A milestone along the Via Flaminia in Miramare marks the third mile away from Rimini. The structure is known in Romagnol as the stronz d'Urland (Italian: stronzo d'Orlando; lit.: Roland's turd). The moniker comes from the size and shape of the milestone, imagining that the legendary Carolingian knight of Ludovico Ariosto's Orlando Furioso (1516), needing to relieve himself on his travels, deposited a turd on the side of the road. (Note: A rock in Piombino, Tuscany, shares the nickname. The phrase may originate from the twelfth canto of Alessandro Tassoni's poem La secchia rapita (1622), in which Sprangon calls Lemizzone stronz d'Urland as an insult.) Several poems document the legend; in one, written in Romagnol, a man explains the moniker to his disbelieving grandson:

This turd, try to understand,
Who made it is anyone's guess.
A Roman? A big man?
Who maybe was called Roland?

He planted it in the right place:
Three miles from the Arch of Augustus.
Given that before there wasn't one,
It has become a milestone.

— Ivano Aurelio Muratori, Ch’jà fat e’ Strónz d’Urland?

== Transport ==
=== Railway station ===
Rimini Miramare
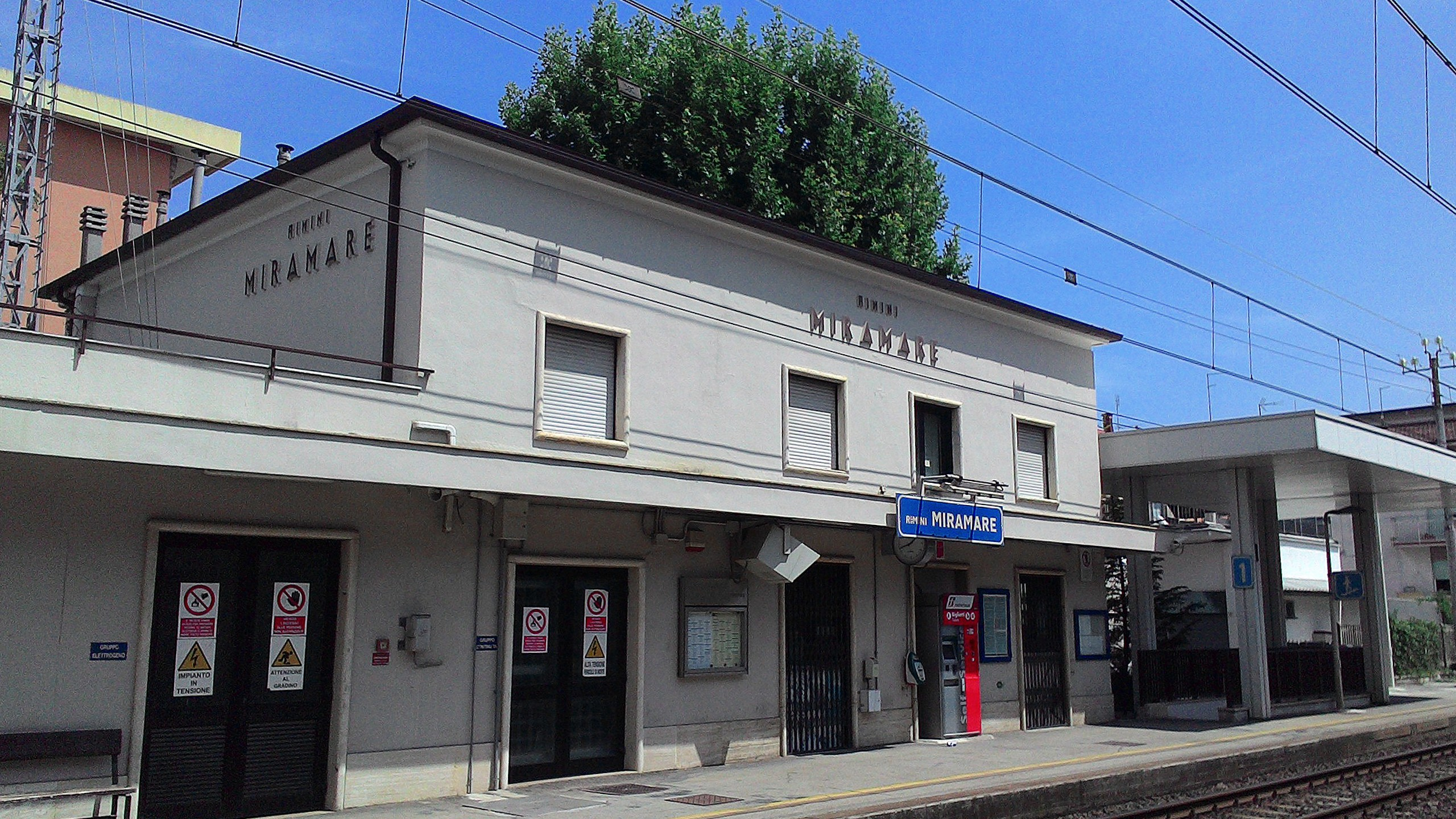
- Rimini Miramare railway station, August 2015

General information
- Location: Viale Ivo Oliveti; Miramare, Rimini (RN); Italy
- System: regional rail
- Line: Bologna–Ancona railway
- Platforms: 2
- Train operators: Trenitalia
- Connections: Metromare; Route 9M bus
Location

Rimini Miramare railway station (Italian: Stazione FS di Rimini Miramare) is a minor station on the Bologna–Ancona railway. The station is accessed from Viale Ivo Oliveti east of the tracks; a pedestrian underpass allows passengers to cross to the road's western continuation. In 2019, the station had an average weekday passenger entry and exit total of 1,020 in July and 203 in November.

As of February 2024, the station is served by regional and fast regional (regionale veloce) trains, typically running between Ancona and Bologna Centrale or Piacenza. More trains stop at Rimini railway station, the next station northbound, and Riccione railway station, the next station southbound.

=== Aviation ===
Miramare is served by Federico Fellini International Airport, immediately to its west. The airport is a crucial nexus in the local economy, particularly for tourists visiting the riviera romagnola. It recorded 215,767 passengers in 2022, rendering it the second-busiest airport in Emilia-Romagna. The airport is mainly served by low-cost carriers and charter traffic.

The airport was built in 1929 as an aerodrome, on the site of the former Rimini-Riccione Defence Section of the army's Aeronautical Service. It ranked among Italy's busiest airports during the 1960s, supported by international tourists visiting Rimini's beaches. Its passenger use declined with the opening of the A14 tolled highway in 1966. Since the end of the Cold War, Fellini Airport has been especially popular among tourists from the countries of the former Soviet Union. Russian and Ukrainian passengers together represented 61% of Fellini Airport's passengers before the 2022 invasion, which was projected to lose the airport 300,000 passengers annually. Alongside its civilian history, the airport has a notable military history: it was the home of the 5th Aerobrigade of the Italian Air Force between 1956 and 2010, and during the Cold War, it was identified by the Warsaw Pact as a strategic target in the event of an all-out war, housing several thousand Italian and NATO soldiers and thirty B61 nuclear bombs. Helicopters belonging to the 7th Army Aviation Regiment "Vega" remain at the airport.

After Fellini Airport, the closest major airports are Luigi Ridolfi Airport in Forlì, Raffaello Sanzio Airport in Ancona, and Guglielmo Marconi Airport in Bologna.

=== Metromare ===
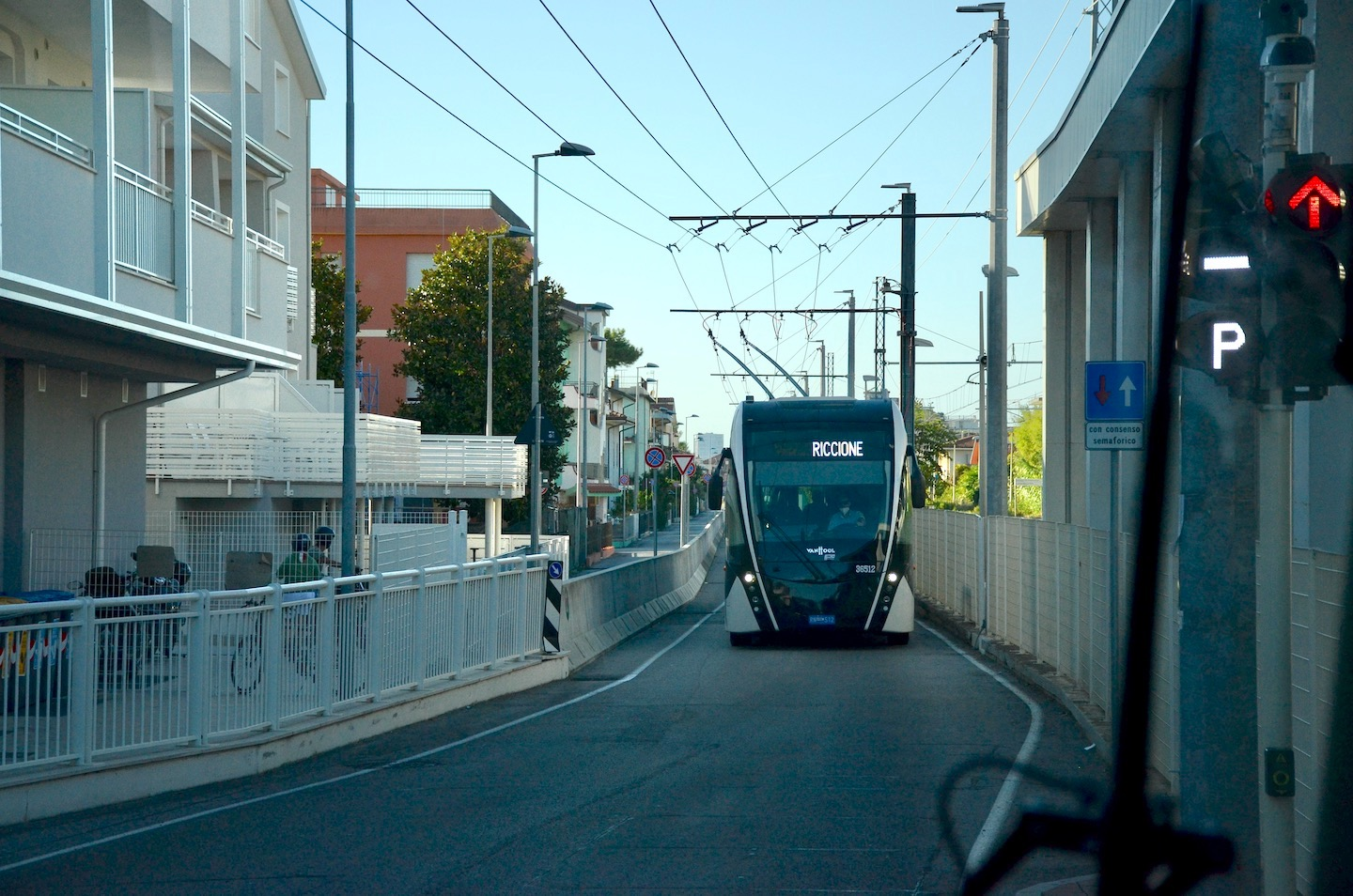
A trolleybus on the Metromare approaching the line's Miramare Station

Opened in 2019, the Metromare trolleybus rapid transit line runs adjacent to the Bologna–Ancona railway with two stops in Miramare: Miramare Station (by the railway station) and Miramare Airport (by Via Cavalieri di Vittorio Veneto). The trolleybus line connects Rimini's railway station to Riccione's railway station. It is operated by Start Romagna SpA.

Miramare's stops on the Metromare fall in a neutral fare zone between those of Rimini and Riccione. Passengers can purchase tickets for travel in one or both fare zones, either of which are valid for journeys starting/terminating at Miramare's Metromare stops.

=== Bus ===
As of June 2023, Miramare is served by the following bus routes, all operated by Start Romagna SpA:

- The route 11 trolleybus runs along Miramare's principal seafront avenue, Viale Regina Margherita/Viale Principe di Piemonte. North of Miramare, the route continues along the principal seafront avenue through the frazioni of Rivazzurra, Marebello and Bellariva, then serves Marina Centro before turning west at Parco Federico Fellini to terminate just past Rimini's railway station. South of Miramare, the route continues along the principal seafront avenue to Riccione's port district, terminating at Riccione Terme.
- Route 9 runs from Fellini Airport to Santarcangelo di Romagna or San Vito. Intermediate stops north of Miramare serve Rimini's southern residential suburbs, the city hospital, the Colonnella district, the Arch of Augustus, Rimini's railway station and Rimini Fiera. In Miramare, the line takes two possible routes: route 9T runs along the SS16 Via Flaminia state road, while route 9M runs adjacent to the railway line along Viale Londra/Viale Mosca, connecting the railway station and both Metromare stops to the airport.
- Route 124 runs along Viale Parigi/Viale Losanna in Miramare. North of Miramare, the route is similar to that of route 9, terminating at Rimini's railway station. South of Miramare, route 124 serves Riccione's northern residential suburbs and hospital, Villaggio Argentina, Misano Cella and Sant'Andrea in Casale, terminating in Morciano di Romagna.
- During the school season, route 134 stops on Miramare's principal seafront avenue. North of Miramare, the route turns off the principal seafront avenue after Bellariva to serve the city centre and railway station via the city hospital. South of Miramare, the route serves Misano Adriatico, Cattolica, San Giovanni in Marignano and Morciano. Outside the school season, route 134 runs between Cattolica and Morciano.

In Start Romagna's fare zone structure, Miramare is designated as zone 951, a neutral fare zone between Rimini and Riccione. Tickets can be sold for one or multiple fare zones; several routes extend to fare zones outside Rimini and Riccione.
