= 7th Army Aviation Regiment "Vega" =

Active Italian Army attack helicopter unit

- 7° Reggimento Aviazione dell'Esercito "Vega"
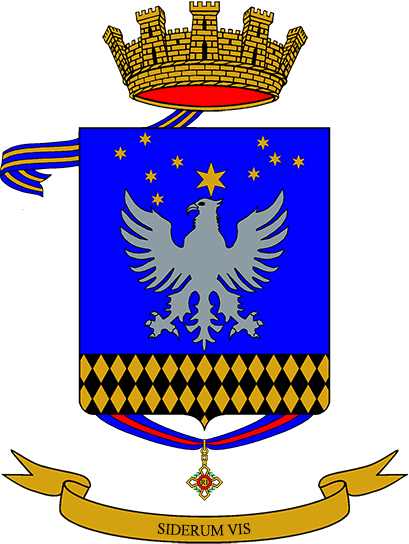
- Regimental coat of arms highlighting Vega within the constellation Lyra
- Active: 5 July 1996 — today
- Country: Italy
- Branch: Italian Army
- Type: Army Aviation
- Part of: Airmobile Brigade "Friuli"
- Garrison/HQ: Rimini Airport
- Motto: "Siderum vis"
- Anniversaries: 10 May 1953 - Founding of the Italian Army Aviation
- Decorations: 1× Military Order of Italy; 1× Bronze Medal of Army Valor

Insignia
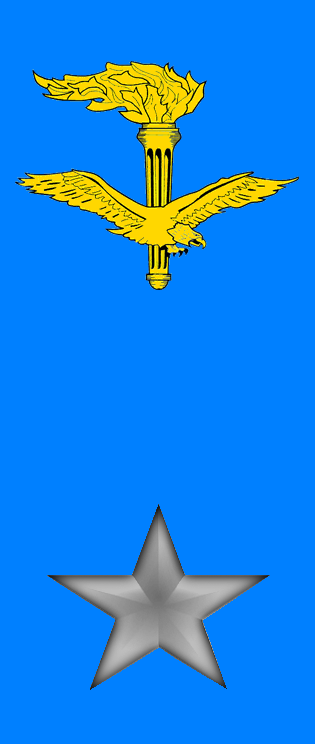
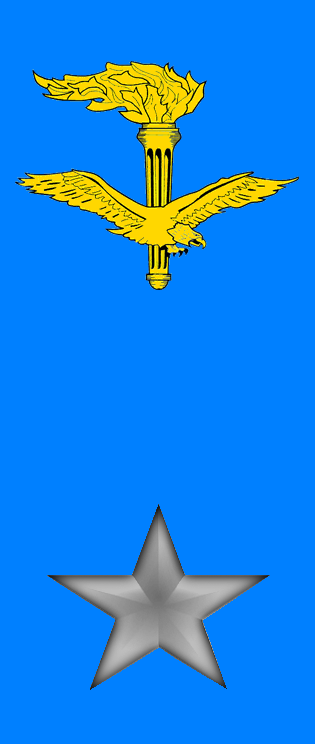
- Army Aviation gorget patches

The 7th Army Aviation Regiment "Vega" (Italian: 7° Reggimento Aviazione dell'Esercito "Vega") is an Italian Army regiment based at Rimini Airport in the Emilia Romagna. The regiment is part of the army aviation and assigned to the Airmobile Brigade "Friuli". The regiment, together with the 5th Army Aviation Regiment "Rigel", constitutes the Italian Army's combat aviation and tactical lift capability. The regiment's anniversary falls, as for all Italian Army aviation units, on 10 May 1953, the day the aviation speciality was founded.

== History ==
=== Formation ===
On 5 July 1996, the 7th Attack Helicopters Regiment "Vega" was formed at Casarsa Airport with personnel and materiel ceded by the 5th Army Aviation Regiment "Rigel". The regiment also received the 55th Multirole Helicopters Squadrons Group "Dragone" from the Northeastern Military Region and the 44th Army Aviation Squadrons Group "Fenice" from the 4th Army Aviation Regiment "Altair". Upon entering the 7th Attack Helicopters Regiment the 44th Squadrons Group was renamed 48th Attack Helicopters Squadrons Group "Pavone". The regiment was assigned to the 5th Army Corps and consisted of the following units:

- 7th Attack Helicopters Regiment "Vega", at Casarsa Airport
  - 48th Attack Helicopters Squadrons Group "Pavone", at Belluno Airport
    - Command and Services Squadron
    - 481st Attack Helicopters Squadron (A129A Mangusta attack helicopters)
    - 482nd Attack Helicopters Squadron (A129A Mangusta attack helicopters)
  - 49th Attack Helicopters Squadrons Group "Capricorno", at Casarsa Airport
    - Command and Services Squadron
    - 491st Attack Helicopters Squadron (A129A Mangusta attack helicopters)
    - 492nd Attack Helicopters Squadron (A129A Mangusta attack helicopters)
  - 55th Multirole Helicopters Squadrons Group "Dragone", at Padua Airport
    - Command and Services Squadron
    - 551st Multirole Helicopters Squadron (AB 205 helicopters)
    - 552nd Multirole Helicopters Squadron (AB 205 helicopters)
  - Support Squadrons Group, at Casarsa Airport
    - Logistic Support Squadron
    - Aircraft Maintenance Squadron

On 1 September 1996, the 55th Multirole Helicopters Squadrons Group "Dragone" was reduced to 551st Army Aviation Squadron "Dragone". On 1 July 1998, the 551st Army Aviation Squadron "Dragone" was reorganized as SOATCC Group (Italian: SOttosistema di Avvistamento Tattico Controaerei Controllo AVES - Tactical Anti-Aircraft Sighting and Army Aviation Control Subsystem) and transferred to the Aviation Inspectorate.

=== Naming ===
Since the 1975 Army reform Italian army aviation units are named for celestial objects: army aviation regiments are numbered with a single digit and named for stars in the 88 modern constellationss. Accordingly, an army aviation regiment's coat of arms highlights the name-giving star within its constellation. Squadron groups were numbered with two digits and named for constellations, or planets of the Solar System. The 7th Army Aviation Regiment was named for Vega, which is the brightest star in the constellation Lyra.

On 15 July 1996, the President of the Italian Republic Oscar Luigi Scalfaro granted the regiment a flag, which has since been decorated with one Military Order of Italy for the regiment's participation in international missions in Albania, Kosovo, Iraq, and Afghanistan, and one Bronze Medal of Army Valor, which was awarded to the then autonomous 48th Reconnaissance Helicopters Squadrons Group "Pavone" for its service after the 1976 Friuli earthquake. Both awards were affixed to the regiments flag and are depicted on the regiments coat of arms.

=== Recent times ===
On 1 September 1998, the 7th Attack Helicopters Regiment "Vega" transferred the 48th Attack Helicopters Squadrons Group "Pavone" to the 5th Army Aviation Regiment "Rigel", which moved on the same date to the former Italian Air Force Miramare Air Base near Rimini. On 23 October of the same year, the 7th Attack Helicopters Regiment "Vega" was renamed 7th Army Aviation Regiment "Vega", and swapped name and flags with the 5th Army Aviation Regiment "Rigel". The 7th Army Aviation Regiment "Vega", which was now based at Miramare Air Base, consisted after the swap of the 25th Army Aviation Squadrons Group "Cigno", the 48th Attack Helicopters Squadrons Group "Pavone", the 53rd Army Aviation Squadrons Group "Cassiopea", and the Support Squadrons Group. On 1 January 1999, the regiment entered the Mechanized Brigade "Friuli", which was in the process of being reorganized as an airmobile brigade.

On 1 June 1999, the Army Aviation was assigned to the Italian Army's Cavalry Arm as a speciality of the arm. Consequently, the 7th Army Aviation Regiment "Vega" was renamed 7th Air Cavalry Regiment "Vega". On 1 May 2000, the 5th Air Cavalry Regiment "Rigel" also joined the Mechanized Brigade "Friuli", which on the same day changed its name to Airmobile Brigade "Friuli". On 3 November 2003, the Air Cavalry left the Italian Army's Cavalry Arm and became, as Army Aviation Specialty, a separate speciality of the Italian Army. Consequently, the 7th Air Cavalry Regiment "Vega" was renamed 7th Army Aviation Regiment "Vega".

In 2008, the 7th Army Aviation Regiment "Vega" began the transition from AB 205 helicopters to NH90 helicopters. On 31 December 2015, the 53rd Squadrons Group "Cassiopea" was disbanded.

== Organization ==
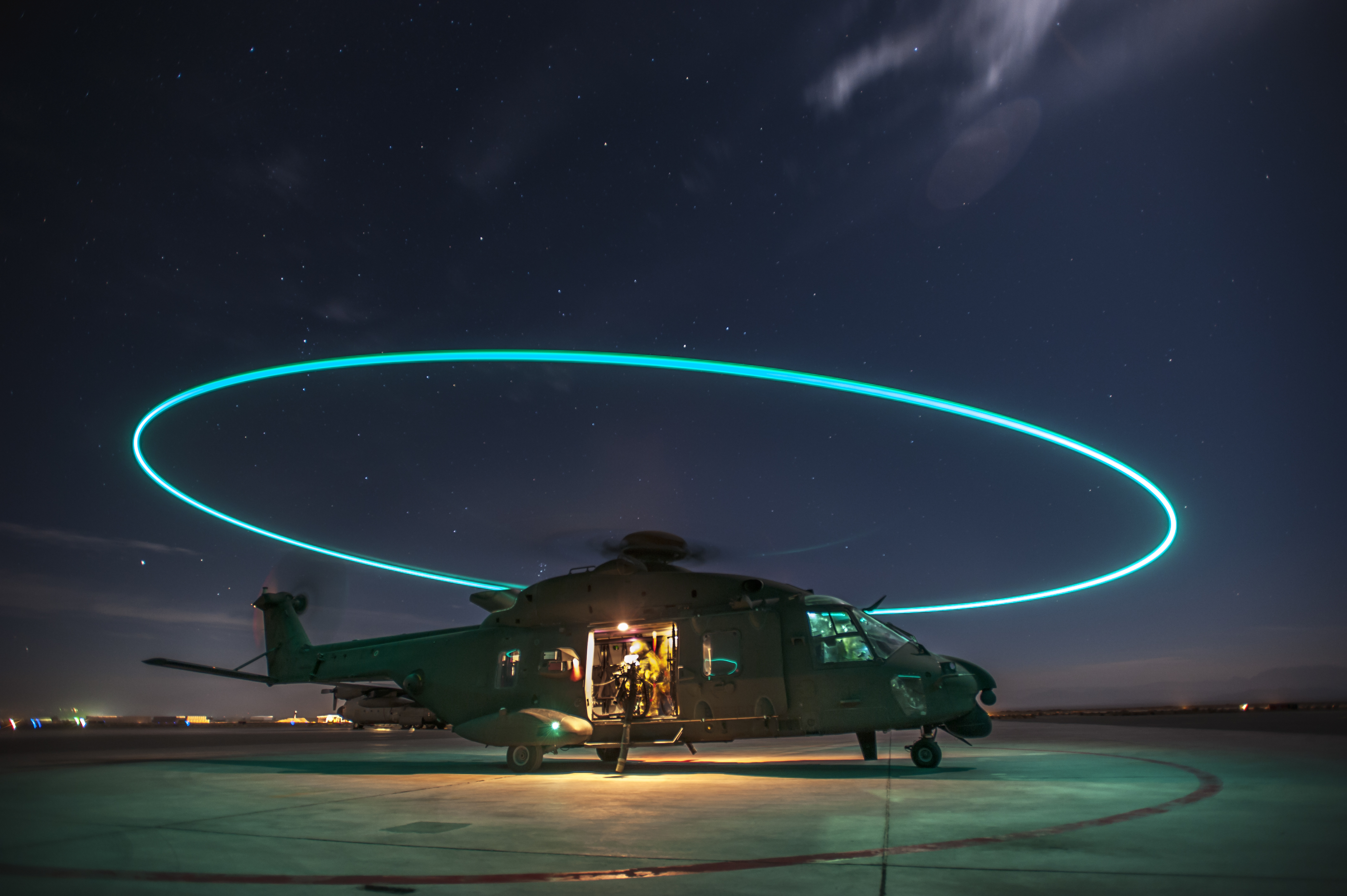
7th Army Aviation Regiment "Vega" NH90 helicopter during a night-time mission

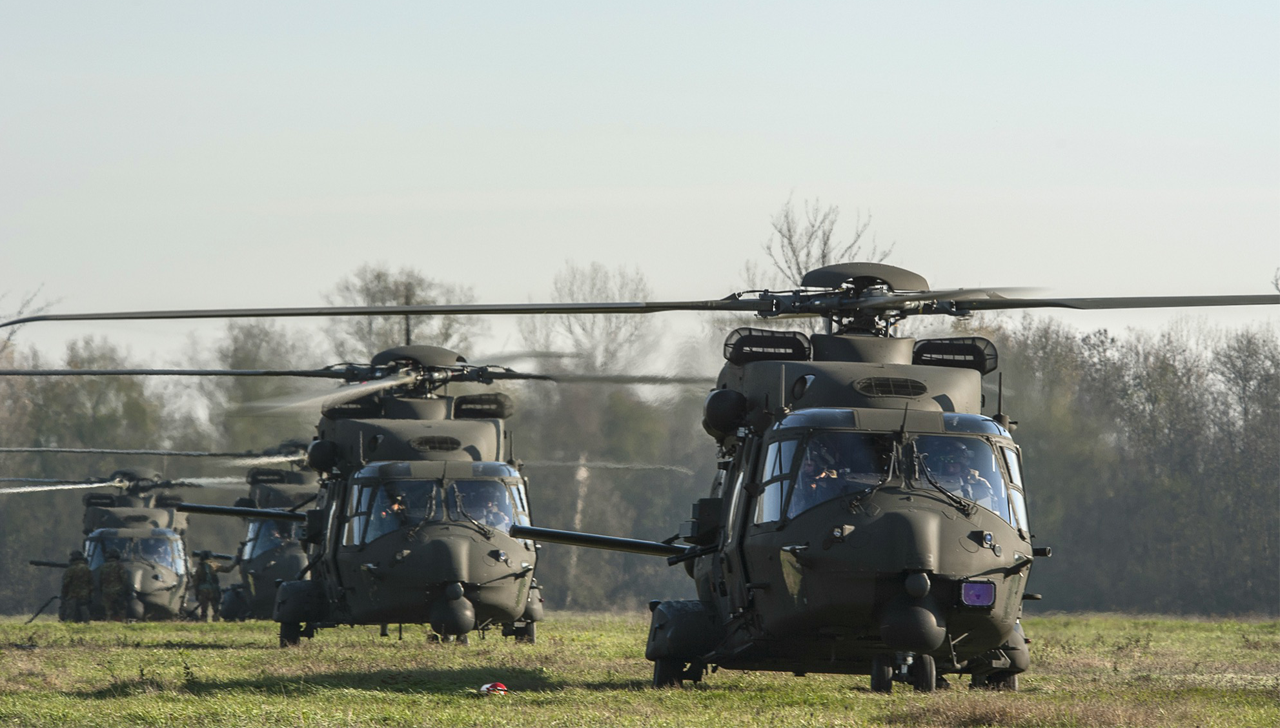
7th Army Aviation Regiment "Vega" NH90 transport helicopters

As of 2024 the 7th Army Aviation Regiment "Vega" is organized as follows:

- 7th Army Aviation Regiment "Vega", at Rimini Airport
  - Headquarters Unit
  - 25th Squadrons Group "Cigno"
    - 251st Combat Support Helicopters Squadron
    - 252nd Combat Support Helicopters Squadron
    - 253rd Combat Support Helicopters Squadron
  - 48th Squadrons Group "Pavone"
    - 481st Attack Helicopters Squadron
    - 482nd Attack Helicopters Squadron
    - 483rd Attack Helicopters Squadron
  - Support Squadrons Group
    - Logistic Support Squadron
    - Aircraft Maintenance Squadron

== Equipment ==
The 25th Squadrons Group "Cigno" is equipped with NH90 transport helicopters and the 48th Squadrons Group "Pavone" with A129D Mangusta attack helicopters, which will be replaced by AW249 Fenice attack helicopters.

== See also ==
- Army Aviation
