= Torraccia =

Curazia of Domagnano, San Marino

- Curazia
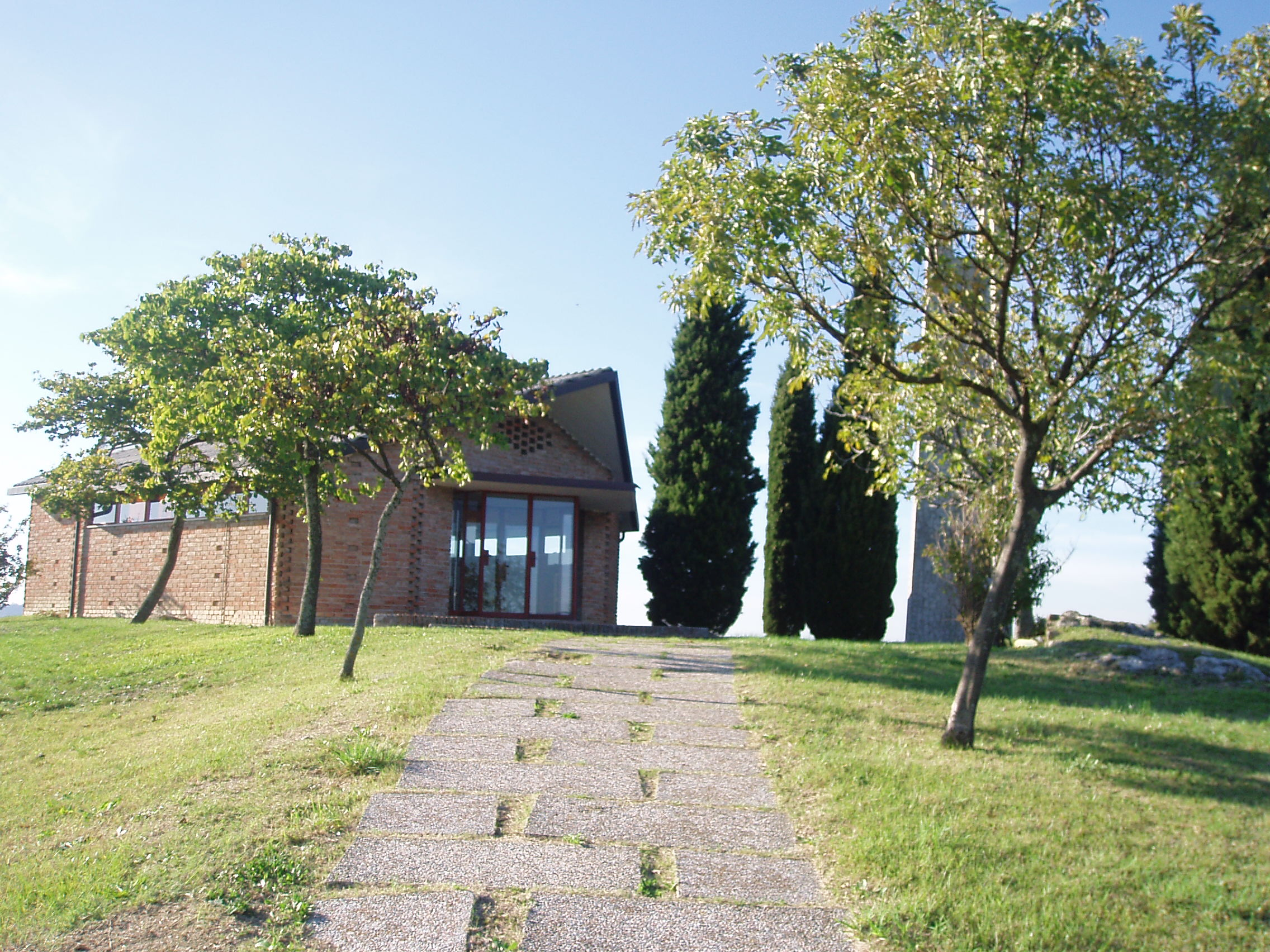
- Village church of Torraccia

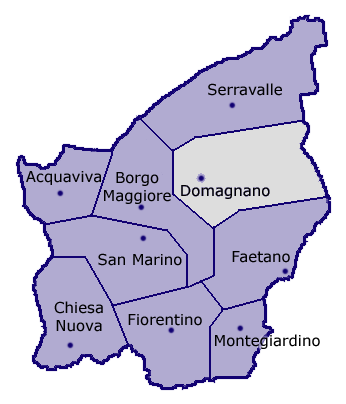
- Location of Domagnano within San Marino

- Location within San Marino
- Coordinates: 43°57′11.6″N 12°30′26.4″E
- Country: San Marino
- Castello: Domagnano
- Elevation: 250 m (820 ft)

Population (2003)
  - Total: 150
- Demonym: torraccesi
- Time zone: UTC+1 (CET)
  - Summer (DST): UTC+2 (CEST)
- Postal code: 47895
- Area code: +378 (0549)

Torraccia is a curazia of San Marino, in the castello of Domagnano.

The village notably includes Torraccia Airfield, a small general aviation aerodrome less than 200 metres (660 feet) from the Italian border, which is San Marino's only aviation facility.

== Geography ==
Torraccia is situated in the east of Domagnano, close to the borders with the Italian municipality of Coriano, in the province of Rimini. It is principally crossed by two roads named Strada di Montelupo and Strada di Monte Olivo. This one links the village to Domagnano, Fiorina and Serravalle.
