= Forlì Airport =

Forlì International Airport Aeroporto Internazionale di Forlì - "L. Ridolfi"
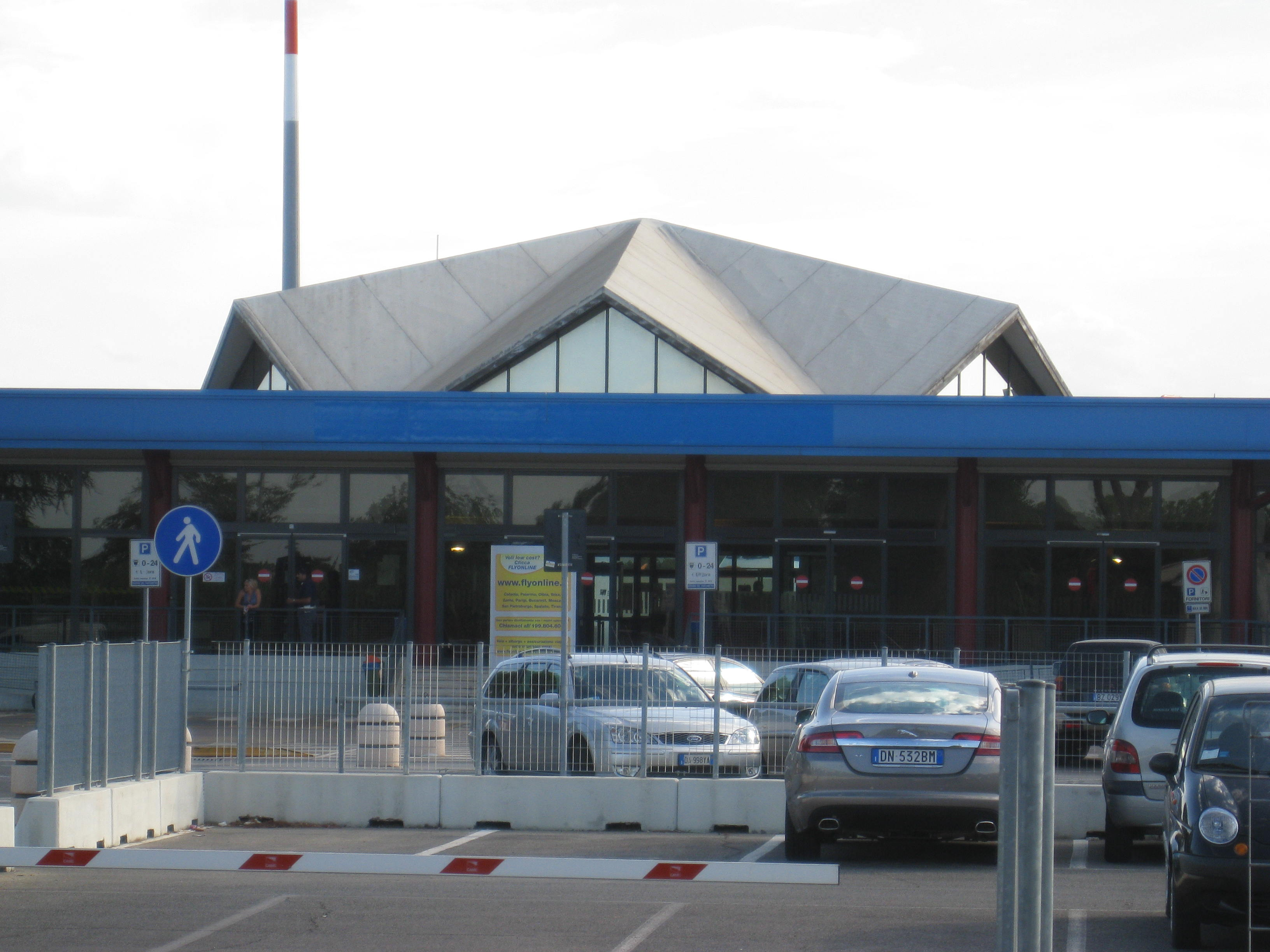
- IATA: FRL; ICAO: LIPK

Summary
- Airport type: Public
- Serves: Forlì
- Location: Forlì, Italy
- Hub for: AeroItalia
- Elevation AMSL: 97 ft (30 m)
- Coordinates: 44°11′42″N 012°04′13″E
- Website: www.forli-airport.com

Map
- Location of the airport in Italy FRL (Italy)

Runways
Direction	Length		Surface
Direction	m	ft	Surface
12/30	2,561	8,402	Asphalt

Statistics (2024)
- Passengers: 133,110
- Passenger change 23-24: ▼ -1.4%
- Aircraft movements: 2,454
- Movements change 23-24: ▼ -1.9%
- Sources: Airport website Statistics from Assaeroporti

Forlì International Airport (IATA: FRL, ICAO: LIPK), also known as Luigi Ridolfi Airport (Italian: Aeroporto di Forlì - "L. Ridolfi"), is an airport in Forlì, a city in the Emilia-Romagna region of northern Italy. It serves Emilia-Romagna, eastern Tuscany, specifically the metropolitan Bologna and Rimini Riviera areas. It is named after the Italian aviator Luigi Ridolfi.

== History ==
Forlì International Airport was originally Luigi Ridolfi Airport, and dedicated by Benito Mussolini before WWII. Mussolini was born in the nearby town of Predappio.

On 29 March 2013, the airport was closed due to the lack of Jet-A fuel per Notam B1624/13. The management company, SEAF S.p.A., was declared bankrupt. A tender was issued by ENAC, the aviation administration, to operate the airport. The submissions were reviewed by local, regional, and pan-EU government representatives, as well as Minister of Transport and Infrastructure Maurizio Lupi. Support was put forth unanimously from government for a submission by Aviacom S.r.L., Robert L Halcombe Administrator, Lotras S.p.A., and Siem S.r.L. forming Air Romagna S.p.A.

The thirty-year concession was awarded on September 28, 2014, to Air Romagna S.p.A. Under the new administration, in 2016 the primary focus was to restructure general aviation operations and in 2017 to bring charter traffic and scheduled airlines. The target commercial passenger area of influence was to be Northern Europe and Scandinavia, major cities west in the European Union, and east to the Russian Federation. Then, through alliances, the intent was to connect with North American markets.

Forlì Airport was formerly used by Wizz Air, but the airline canceled all flights to Forlì. Wind Jet moved to the nearby Rimini Airport on 27 March 2011, and thereafter quit the latter too, filing for administration shortly after. Ryanair used to fly from Forlì to a number of European cities such as London-Stansted and Frankfurt-Hahn until it moved to the nearby Bologna Airport.

== Facilities ==
The airport resides at an elevation of 97 ft (30 m) above mean sea level. It has one runway designated 12/30 with an asphalt surface measuring 2,561 by 45 metres (8,402 ft × 148 ft). The facility upgraded to navigation Cat III(b) in 2016. A highway was completed in June 2014, providing a direct access from major north–south artery road, A-14.

Currently, new terminal space is being designed which makes use of only renewable and low carbon materials. Old fossil-fuel equipment is being phased out, to be replaced by electric vehicles. Electric power consumed at the airport must be contracted from clean, renewable sources. The airport reserved the right in all sub-concessions (services such as catering, trash, etc.) to require renewable or recycled materials and vehicles operated by renewable energy.

Forlì International Airport is also the home of three major aviation universities and training facilities, serving ENAV (air navigation and air traffic control school), ENAC (pilot and cabin crew training), and aircraft certification and maintenance advance training. It similarly has attracted maintenance and manufacture of civilian drones, and the first pan-European aviation and aerospace business incubator.

== Airlines and destinations ==
The following airlines offer regular scheduled and charter services at the airport:

Airlines	Destinations
Ryanair	Cagliari, Palermo; Seasonal: London–Stansted

== Transportation ==
Forlì Airport is located 4 km (2.5 mi) from the city centre and is very close to the SS9 "Via Emilia" national route.

Forlì Railway station is situated about 5 km (3.1 mi) from the airport and travellers can connect via bus route number 7 of START Romagna (Fiera-Stazione FS-Airport-Ronco).

== See also ==
- List of airports in Italy
