= Wind Jet =

Low-cost airline

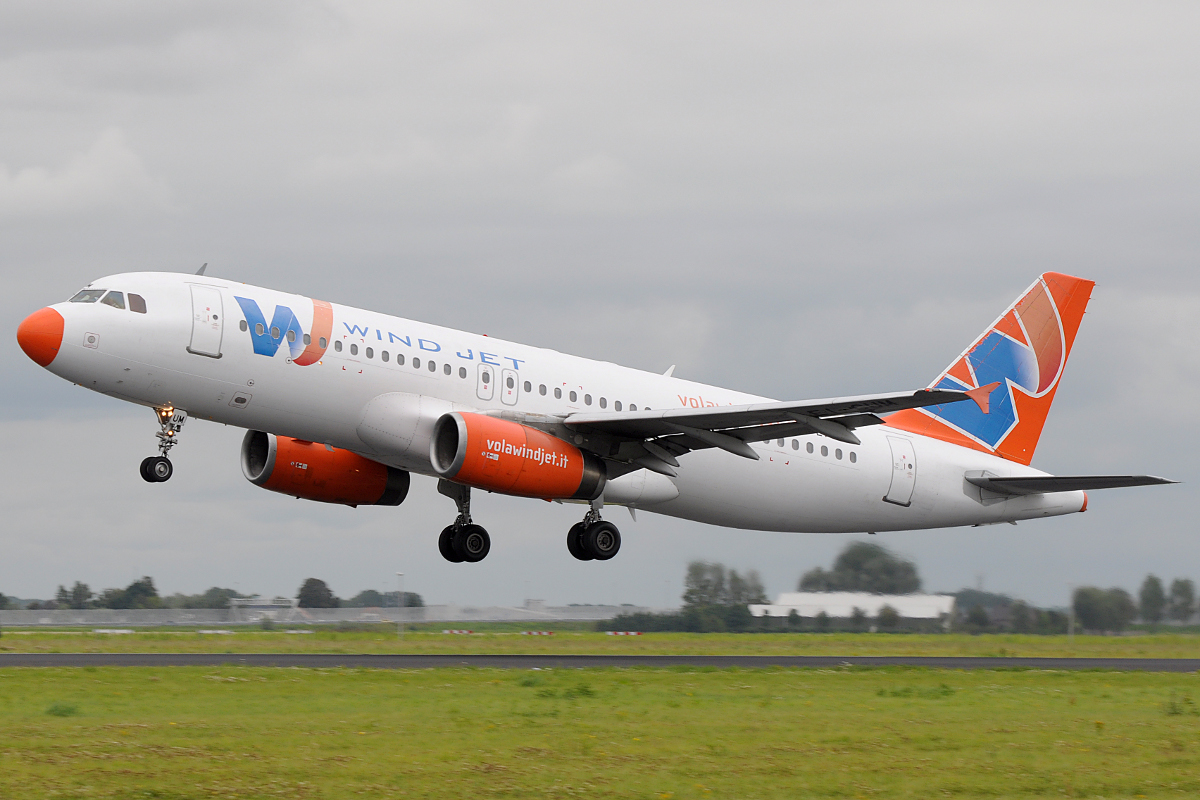
- Airbus A320-200
IATA	ICAO	Call sign
IV	JET	GHIBLI
- Founded: January 2003
- Ceased operations: 11 August 2012
- Operating bases: Palermo; Rimini
- Hubs: Catania
- Fleet size: 12
- Destinations: 26
- Headquarters: Catania
- Key people: Antonino Pulvirenti (founder and president)
- Website: www.volawindjet.it

Wind Jet S.p.A. was an Italian low-cost airline based in Catania, Italy. It was founded in January 2003, following the disbandment of Air Sicilia by Antonino Pulvirenti, entrepreneur and for some years also owner of football team Calcio Catania. The registered office was in the city and the operational bases were at the airport of the same city and of Palermo, the capital of Sicily. It was 100% owned by the Finaria Group, Pulvirenti-owned holding. On 11 August 2012 the airline ceased operations until further notice due to financial troubles. At that time it was the third-largest Italian airline by passenger numbers, and operated national and European flights primarily from its most important hub, Catania.

== History ==
=== Promising start ===
The first flight, a Catania-Rome one, took place on June 18, 2003, with 142 passengers aboard an Airbus A320-200. By July, three of this medium-range, medium-capacity twin-engine aircraft were in service. The network's main hubs were Catania and Palermo, with direct flights to Rome, Milan, Forlì (an alternative to Bologna), and even Paris. After a year of operation, it had carried nearly one million passengers. In March 2006, a flight between Forlì and Moscow (Domodedovo Airport) was inaugurated. Two months later, a flight to Romania (Bucharest) was inaugurated as well. During the year, flights also began to Pisa, Verona, and, once again in Russia, St. Petersburg. Eleven A320s were in service. The company subsequently declared that 2.2 million passengers were carried in one year. In 2007, two Airbus A319-100s, purchased from Air France, were delivered and joined the 8 A320s already in service. The following year, with over 2.9 million passengers, Wind Jet became Italy's leading low-cost airline. In 2009, a new permanent operating base was opened at Forlì airport, but was moved to Rimini-Miramare airport two years later.

=== Unexpected difficulties ===
Difficulties emerged, however, because the company had grown, but beyond its means and capabilities. In January 2012, Alitalia-CAI declared its interest in a three-way merger, including Blue Panorama, but in April, Wind Jet revealed significant financial losses and temporarily laid off over 500 employees. The crisis was attributed to the unfavorable international economic situation, rising raw material costs, and several accidents and exceptional events, such as the purchase of the Wind Jet brand from parent company Meridi for €10 million. On 12 April, Alitalia-CAI chose to pursue the sole acquisition of Wind Jet with a cash payment of between 20 and 30 million €uros.

=== Bankruptcy and closure ===
By the end of July, the Italian antitrust authority granted Alitalia leave to acquire Wind Jet, but in return Alitalia would have to give up slots on key domestic routes. Faced with this, Alitalia cancelled the plans on August 10. ENAC (Italian civil aviation authority) sent Wind Jet a request for guarantees of solvency towards creditors and regularity of flight operations. The agency also asked to stop issuing tickets, a measure that WindJet adopted by closing its website. On August 11, all flights were suspended. Approximately 300,000 passengers with reservations were left high and dry. The Italian authorities tried to prompt Alitalia to acquire Wind Jet, but they did not succeed.

On October 19, 2013, 92% of creditors voted to resume the company's operations. The agreement provided for the repayment of 48% of the debts to privileged creditors and 5% to all others. This agreement was made possible thanks to the intervention of president Pulvirenti, who provided the capital of the holding company he owned. In July 2015, the Catania prosecutor's office placed 14 people under investigation, including the company's top management, on charges of fraudulent bankruptcy. President Pulvirenti, along with CEO Stefano Rantuccio, were arrested on January 29, 2016, by the Guardia di Finanza (Italian tax & revenues Police) on orders from the Catania Court. They were accused of aggravating the airline's financial crisis by over €uros 160 million through fraudulent operations carried out starting in 2005.

== Fleet ==
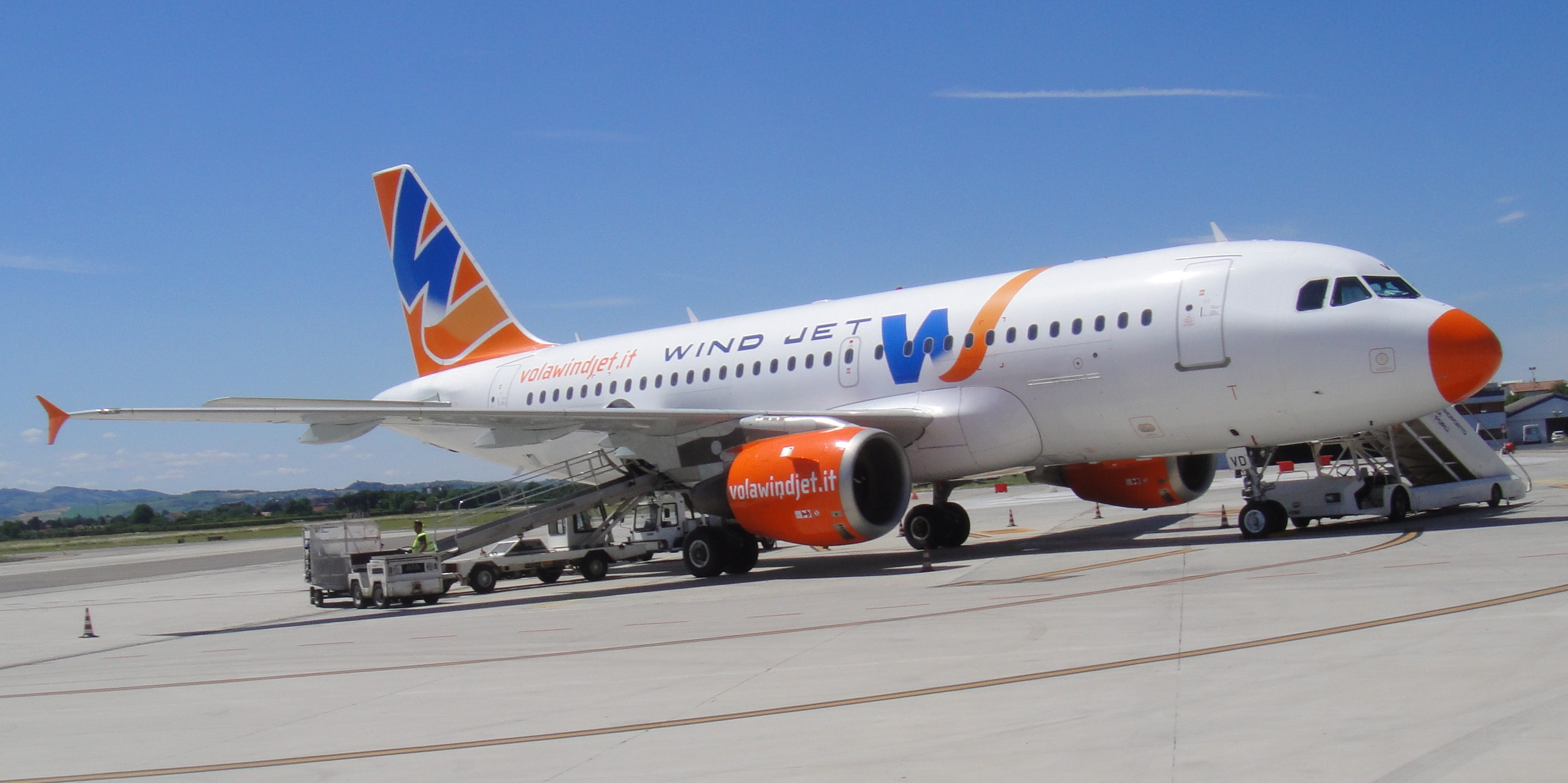
Airbus A319-100

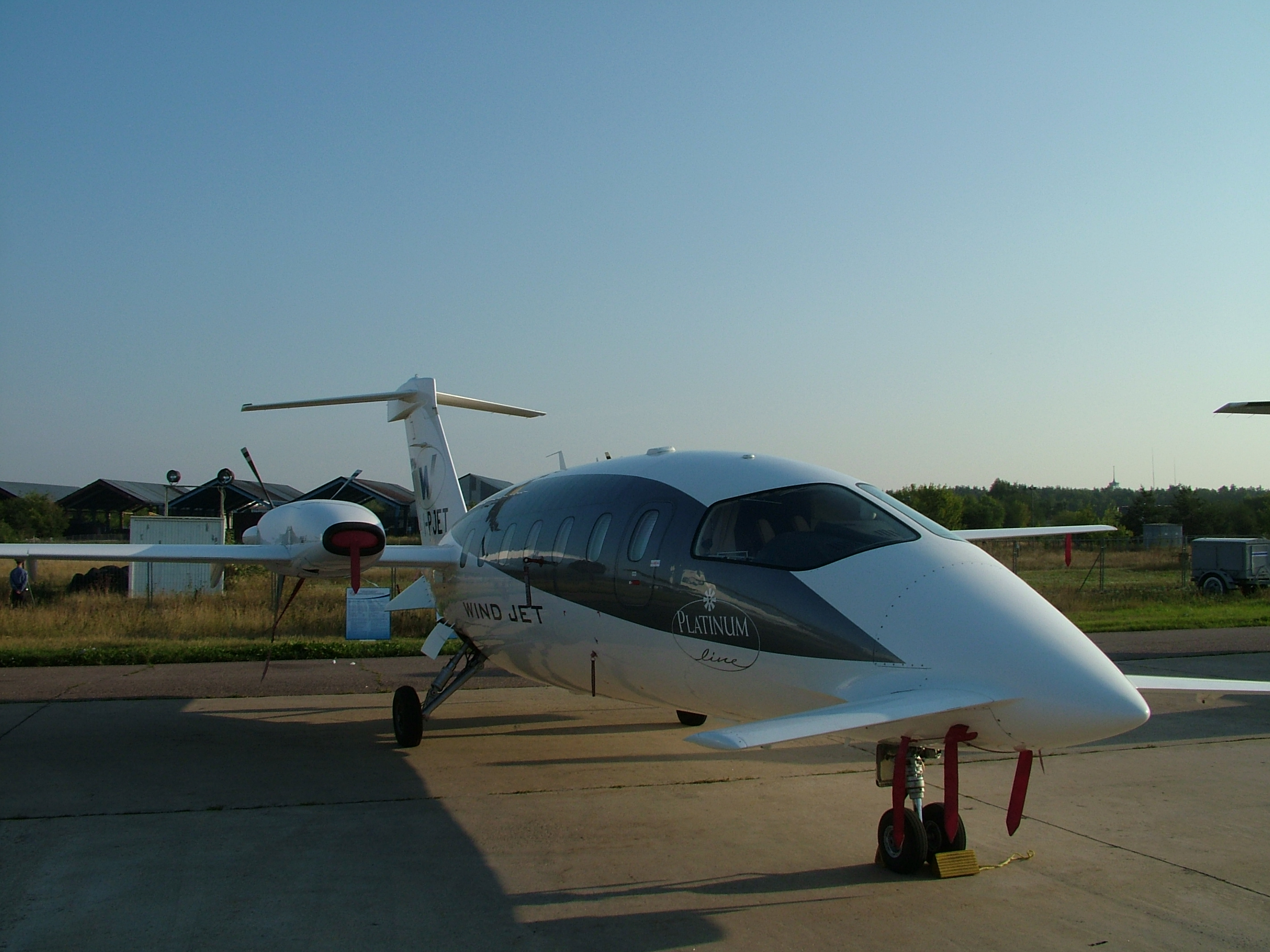
Piaggio P.180

The Wind Jet fleet consisted of the following aircraft (as of 23 May 2012):

Wind Jet fleet
Aircraft	In fleet	Orders	Seats	Notes
Airbus A319-100	5	0	140	
Airbus A320-200	7	0	180	
Total	12	0		

Under the brand, Wind Jet Platinum Line, Wind Jet operated an air taxi service with two Piaggio P180 Avanti aircraft.

== Incidents and accidents ==
- On 24 September 2010, Wind Jet Flight 243, operated by an Airbus A319-132, registration EI-EDM (ex. N501NK), landed short of the runway at Punta Raisi Airport, Palermo, Italy after encountering a thunderstorm and windshear on approach. The approach was conducted at night. The aircraft was damaged beyond repair when it impacted the localiser—both main undercarriage sets collapsed and the aircraft was evacuated by the emergency slides. Around twenty passengers were injured, mostly sustaining minor cuts and bruises, whiplash, and shock. One passenger was reported to have dislocated his shoulder. The Agenzia Nazionale per la Sicurezza del Volo opened an investigation into the accident. Wind Jet stated that they believed windshear was the cause of the incident. However the incident was mainly due to pilot error. The crew opted to continue the approach despite not being visual with the runway by the decision altitude. The pilots were brought to trial in 2013, on the basis that the accident was not caused by windshear but by errors of the two pilots. Both of them asked to be processed via short-trial procedure.
