= Rimini Fellini Airport =

Airport in Rimini, Italy

Rimini and San Marino "Federico Fellini" International Airport Aeroporto Internazionale di Rimini e San Marino 'Federico Fellini'

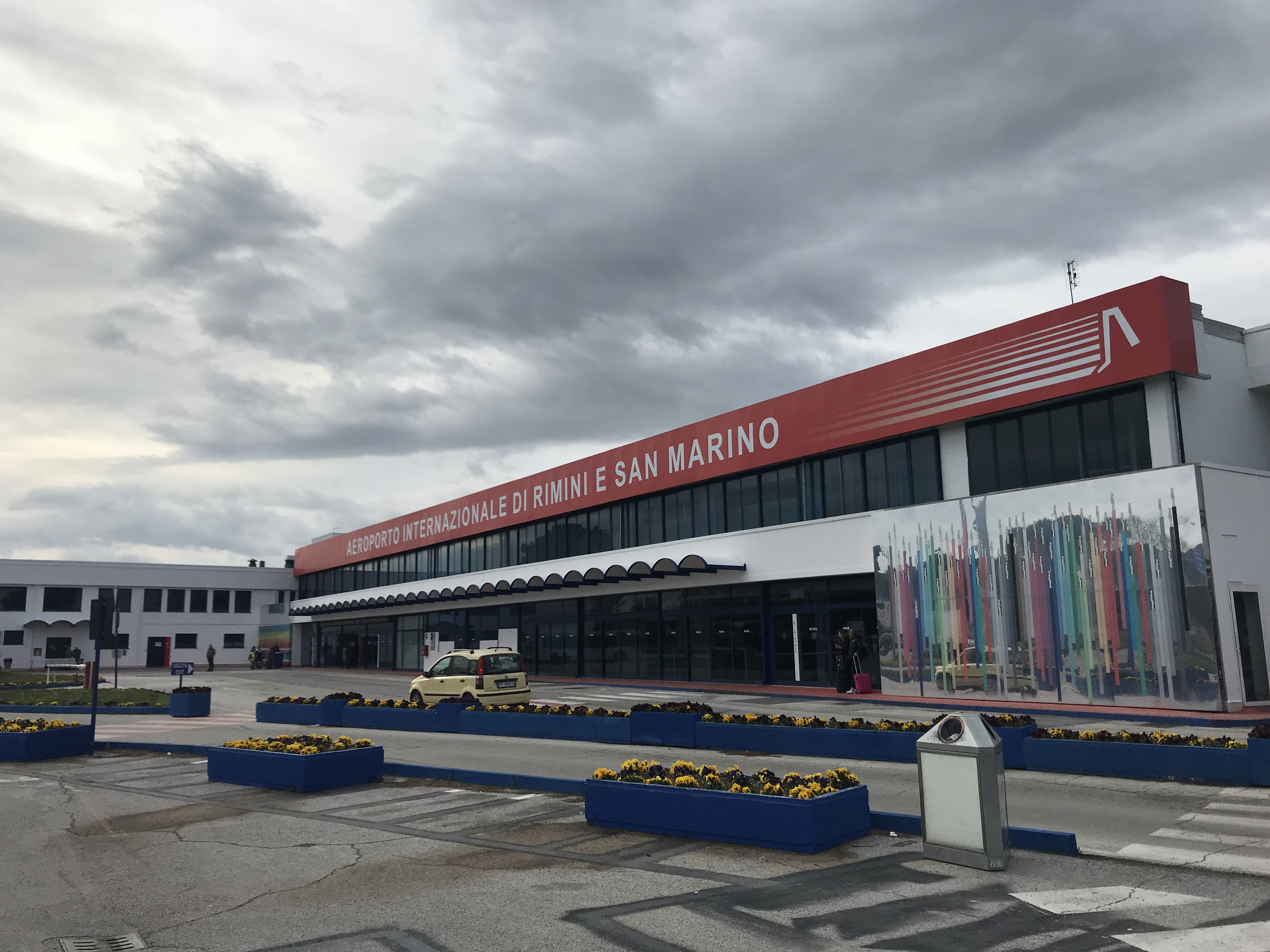
- IATA: RMI; ICAO: LIPR

Summary
- Airport type: Public
- Operator: Airiminum 2014 SpA
- Serves: Province of Rimini; San Marino
- Location: Miramare, Rimini, Emilia-Romagna, Italy
- Opened: August 17, 1929; 97 years ago
- Time zone: CET (UTC+01:00)
  - Summer (DST): CEST (UTC+02:00)
- Elevation AMSL: 12 m (39 ft)
- Coordinates: 44°01′10″N 012°36′34″E
- Website: riminiairport.com

Map
- Location in Italy RMI (Italy)

Runways
Direction	Length		Surface
Direction	m	ft	Surface
13/31	2,964	9,723	Concrete/asphalt

Statistics (2024)
- Passengers: 321,552
- Passenger change 23–24: ▲14.1%
- Aircraft movements: 4,094
- Movements change 23–24: ▲11.4%
- Source: Italian Civil Aviation Authority

Rimini and San Marino "Federico Fellini" International Airport (Italian: Aeroporto Internazionale di Rimini e San Marino 'Federico Fellini'; IATA: RMI, ICAO: LIPR), formerly Rimini Miramare Airport (Italian: Aeroporto di Rimini Miramare), and more simply known as Rimini Airport or Fellini Airport, is an international airport located in Rimini, in the region of Emilia-Romagna, northern Italy.

Fellini Airport is located in the southern frazione of Miramare, 5.2 kilometres (3.2 mi) southeast of Rimini's city centre and near Riccione. As well as serving the Province of Rimini, it is the main aerial gateway to the Republic of San Marino. The airport is a crucial nexus in the local economy, particularly for tourists visiting the riviera romagnola. Since the airport's reopening in 2014, following the bankruptcy of the previous management company, Fellini Airport has been managed by AIRiminum 2014 SpA. It is named after Italian filmmaker Federico Fellini, who was born in Rimini, and recorded 215,767 passengers in 2022, rendering it the second-busiest airport in Emilia-Romagna after Bologna Airport. The airport is mainly served by low-cost carriers and charter traffic.

The airport was built in 1928 as an aerodrome, on the site of the former Rimini-Riccione Defence Section of the army's Aeronautical Service. It ranked among Italy's busiest airports during the 1960s, supported by international tourists visiting Rimini's beaches. Its passenger use declined with the opening of the A14 tolled highway in 1966. Since the end of the Cold War, Fellini Airport has been especially popular among tourists from the countries of the former Soviet Union. Russian and Ukrainian passengers together represented 61% of Fellini Airport's passengers before the 2022 invasion, which was projected to lose the airport 300,000 passengers annually. Alongside its civilian history, the airport has a notable military history: it was the home of the 5th Aerobrigade of the Italian Air Force between 1956 and 2010, and during the Cold War, it was identified by the Warsaw Pact as a strategic target in the event of an all-out war, housing several thousand Italian and NATO soldiers and thirty B61 nuclear bombs. Helicopters belonging to the 7th Army Aviation Regiment "Vega" remain at the airport.

== History ==
=== Early years ===
The site of the airport was used between July 1916 and November 1918 for the Rimini-Riccione Defence Section of the army's Aeronautical Service. The first airfield was constructed in 1929, with a single 500-metre (1,600-foot) dirt runway perpendicular to the coastline. An aviation club was established in the airfield soon after its opening. On 15 June 1929, the Office of Civil Aviation approved a thrice-weekly summer passenger service to Milan, operated by Avio Linee Italiane; the maiden flight landed in Rimini on 17 August. In 1931, the airfield was designated as a stopover on flights between Rome and London, and services began to Venice, Vienna, Munich, and Brindisi.

A military and aerostatic facility was developed at the airfield in the early 1930s, and became operational by 19 November 1937. On 28 March 1938, the airport was dedicated as a military airport and named after Giannetto Vassura, a Cotignolese pilot and Sergeant Major in the Italian Army who died on his first aerial deployment during the Battle of Vittorio Veneto in the First World War. The surrounding streets were named after Italian pilots, while a dancing bar opened for aviators outside the airport. Civil aviation continued, and from 20 July 1939, an overnight service allowed business travellers to return to Milan after a day on Rimini's beach.

The airport sustained heavy aerial bombardment in the Second World War, when it was used as a prisoner-of-war camp for captured Allied soldiers. During the Battle of Rimini, German forces defended the airport with Panther turrets, barring Allied forces from advancing further up the Gothic Line along the end of the Via Flaminia. The 3rd Greek Mountain Brigade and the 18th New Zealand Armoured Regiment engaged the airport, whose defence and capture was central to the Battle of Rimini. After its capture, it returned to its use as a prisoner-of-war camp, housing up to 80,000 Axis forces. The camp was lightly surveilled and both prostitution and escape were rife. Erich Priebke, a perpetrator of the Ardeatine massacre, was a notable escapee.

=== Military history ===
In July 1956, the airport became the home of the 5th Aerobrigade of the Italian Air Force. It soon became an important military base for the Cold War, employing up to 2,000 air force soldiers and several hundred NATO soldiers, who were housed in a special "blue village" accommodation inside the airport complex that was built in the 1960s. From 1964, as many as 18 Lockheed F-104G fighter-bombers were stationed at the airport. Until 1991, four underground bunkers at the base housed around thirty B61 nuclear bombs, later returned to the United States. The opening of state archives in Budapest revealed that the airport was identified by the Warsaw Pact as a sensitive target in the event of an all-out war. The airport was also the site of several pacifist protests.

Smaller military units began withdrawing from the airport in September 1993, at the conclusion of the Cold War. The military command bunker was dismantled in the 1990s. In September 2010, the 5th Aerobrigade completed its transfer to Cervia. Some military personnel remained to operate the control tower, radar service, and weather station; these were transferred to civilian control in November 2016. The control tower and weather station were transferred to ENAV, while the radar service came under the control of Bologna Avvicinamento. Helicopters belonging to the 7th Army Aviation Regiment "Vega" remained in Rimini.

In November 2022, it was reported that the remaining military sector of the airport would move upstream, where new hangars would be built to house the new 'Fenice' helicopter that would replace the current 'Mongusta' helicopter. In its place, the military sector would inaugurate an educational hub including a kindergarten and nursery school at the site of the former barracks. Staff accommodation would remain at their current site.

=== Aeradria ===
In 1958, after a campaign by senator Gino Zannini, the airport reopened to civilian traffic for fortnightly flights to London. The authorisation was granted on 23 February 1958 at a meeting in Rome between military and civil authorities and a delegation of Aero Club Rimini, led by aviator Tullio de Prato. In 1962, the management company Aeradria was founded. That year, Fellini Airport recorded 67,205 passengers on 1,120 flights. In 1966, Fellini Airport was Italy's fourth busiest airport by passenger numbers, with 392,594 passengers and 7,450 flights. Summer passenger movements exceeded annual movements in Turin Airport, explained in part by Italians' aversion to flying.

Prior to the opening of the A14 tolled highway in 1966, Fellini Airport was the main gateway to the riviera romagnola for foreign tourists, who constituted 60% of the tourism market. Fellini Airport would handle a hundred planes daily during the summer. The opening of the A14 reduced road journey times between Bologna and Rimini from eight hours to one, shifting the local tourist economy towards domestic tourism and reducing international demand from countries such as West Germany. The number of passengers peaked in 1972 with 558,000 passengers. By 1977, the airport recorded only 1,800 passenger flights; by 1993, there were only 42,311 passengers. From 1933, passenger numbers grew with tourists from the countries of the former Soviet Union.

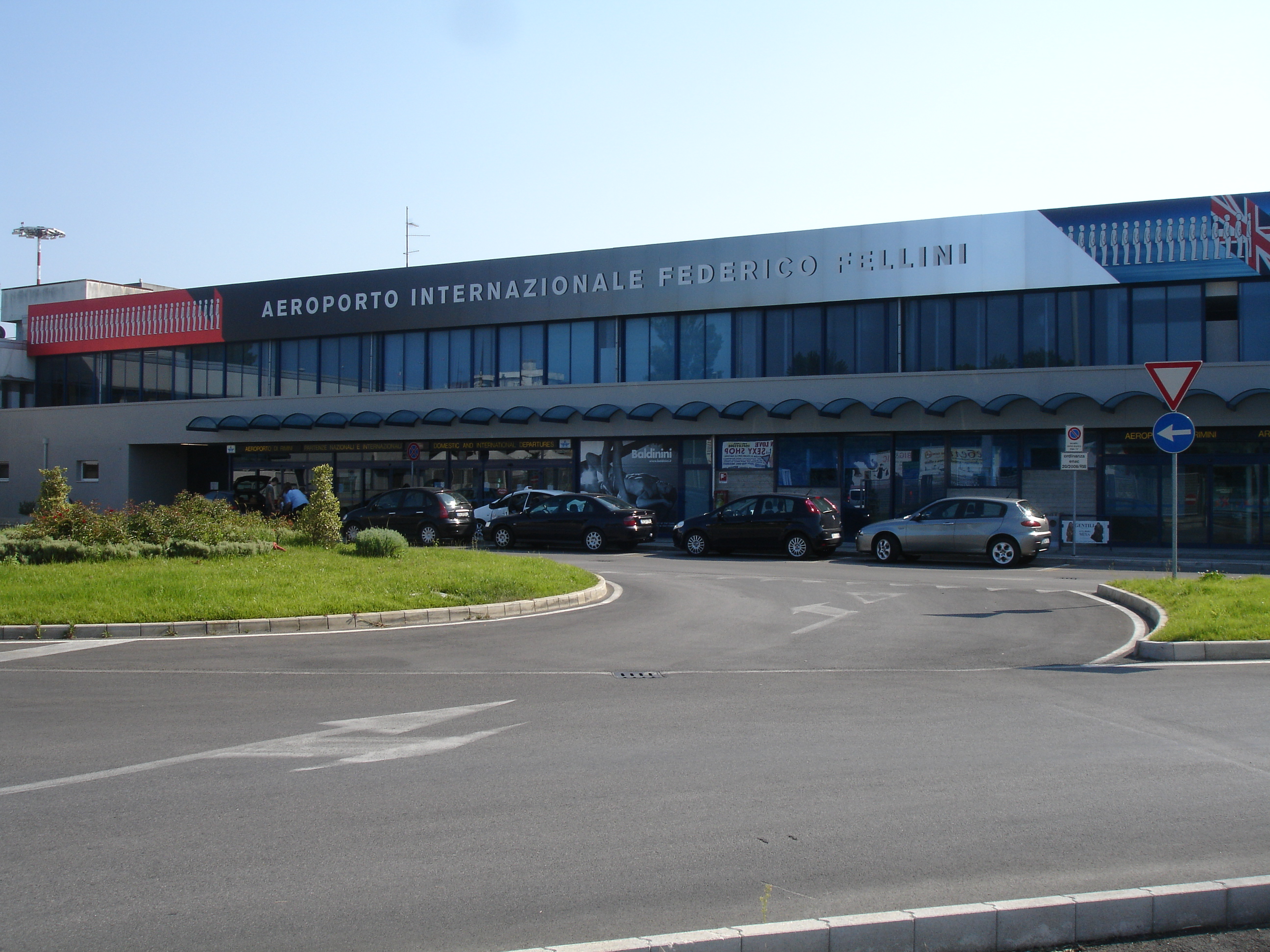
The terminal building in August 2009

In May and June 2004, Fellini saw increased passenger movements as a result of redirected flights from Bologna Airport, which was closed for works.

In 2011, Fellini Airport recorded its highest number of annual passengers, with 916,239 passengers. 44% of passengers were from Russia, and there were 4,800 passengers on private flights. Fellini Airport was connected with seventy destinations in thirty-two countries. The feat was helped by WindJet moving its operations from Forlì Airport. The record led the Civil Aviation Authority briefly to restrict Fellini Airport's passenger movements, following concerns about the anti-dust strips and a required renovation of the airport apron.

On 26 November 2013, Aeradria was declared bankrupt after accumulating a debt of 58 million euros. The tendering process for new management was advertised on 7 May 2014. The airport closed on 1 November 2014, with commercial flights diverted to Ancona Falconara Airport. Following Aeradria's failure, on 4 November 2014, temporary management of the airport passed to Aero Club Rimini, a sports association that kept the airport open for general aviation.

=== Ariminum 2014 ===
In November 2014, the airport's management was definitively awarded to Ariminum 2014 SpA. Fellini Airport reopened to commercial traffic on 1 April 2015. Russian airlines dominated among the first companies to fly to the reopened airport, including Transaero, VIM, Yamal, and Ural. Ryanair returned to Fellini Airport in 2018, and winter flights began from 2023. Wizz Air arrived in 2022, with a contract until 2027.

The reopening of Forlì Airport presented a competitor to Fellini Airport that fuelled a significant regional "war of the skies". In June 2022, Ariminum sued Albawings for advertising flights to Rimini that were landing at Forlì with an onwards bus connection. Albawings had flown from Fellini Airport with 30,000 annual passengers from 2016 until October 2021, when it unexpectedly resumed post-pandemic operations at Forlì, for which Ariminum requested compensation.

In February 2022, security captured a roe deer that had been roaming in the airport grounds for several months after her fawn had become trapped inside. The deer had become the subject of protests by animal welfare groups, which feared that it would be killed.

Prior to the Russian invasion of Ukraine, the airport served several dozen weekly flights to Russia and Ukraine. Russian and Ukrainian traffic represented 61% of Fellini Airport's traffic. Ariminum projected that the suspension of air connections lost the airport a projected 300,000 passengers in 2022.

== Facilities and operations ==
The airport is at an elevation of 12 metres (39 feet) above mean sea level. It has one runway designated 13/31 with an asphalt surface measuring 2,996 by 45 metres (9,829 by 148 feet), making it the longest runway in Emilia-Romagna. On 22 April 2021, the airport was equipped with Required Navigation Performance satellite approaches, permitting more aircraft movements during adverse weather conditions.

The airport's L-shaped two-floor passenger terminal measures 15,500 square metres (167,000 square feet). The ground floor contains both the arrival and departure lounges, while boarding gates are located on the ground floor for the Schengen Area and the first floor for elsewhere. Commercial shops and offices are also on the first floor. In October 2011, the airport opened a 150-square-metre (1,600-square-foot) VIP lounge, including two check-in desks and 45 seats.

The airport has nine stands. In 2022, to allow the parking of Boeing 747 models, the runway was reinforced and a large apron created on the airport's Riccione side to allow airplanes more easily to manoeuvre to the terminal. Additionally, the arrivals area of the terminal was renovated with new floors and ceilings, and an easier exit to the car parks.

== Official presence of San Marino ==
The government of San Marino first expressed an interest in entering the management of Fellini Airport in the early 1980s. Since then, the governments of San Marino and Italy have signed several bilateral agreements concerning San Marino's access to the airport. As a result of these accords, all air carriers recognised by San Marino have been able to fly to Fellini Airport, the Sammarinese government has been able to decide commercial routes, Sammarinese companies have been able to operate in Italian airports without restrictions, and the Sammarinese government has been able to carry out customs operations at Fellini Airport in agreement with the Italian authorities.

In 2002, the Sammarinese government acquired a 3% stake in Fellini Airport's management company, Aeradria. The airport was officially named Rimini-San Marino Airport. In June 2018, the subsequent management company, Airiminum, repainted the terminal sign to read Aeroporto Internazionale di Rimini e San Marino (Rimini and San Marino International Airport), replacing the previous Aeroporto Internazionale Federico Fellini (Federico Fellini International Airport).

The most significant agreement, ratified on 16 September 2013, provided San Marino a forty-year concession over some areas of Fellini Airport. The areas were expected to host a private terminal, with a customs border allowing goods destined for San Marino not to pass through Italian customs. As of August 2023, Sammarinese authorities still have no presence at the airport.

== Airlines and destinations ==
The following airlines operate regular scheduled and charter flights at Fellini Airport:

Airlines	Destinations
British Airways	Seasonal: London–Heathrow
easyJet	Seasonal: Basel/Mulhouse, London–Gatwick
GetJet Airlines	Seasonal charter: Vilnius
Luxair	Seasonal: Luxembourg
Neos	Seasonal: Marsa Matruh, Sharm El Sheikh
Ryanair	Cagliari, Catania, Tirana, Seasonal: Budapest, Cologne/Bonn, Kaunas, Kraków, London–Stansted, Manchester, Palermo, Prague, Vienna, Wrocław
Wizz Air	Tirana; Seasonal: Budapest, Chișinău, Katowice, Sofia

== Statistics ==
=== Overview ===
In 2022, 17% of Fellini Airport's traffic was domestic, an additional 23% was international within the European Union, and the remaining 60% was traffic outside the European Union.

=== In table ===
Annual commercial traffic statistics for Fellini Airport
Year	Passengers handled	Passenger % change	Cargo (tonnes)	Cargo % change	Aircraft movements	Aircraft % change
2001	214,002	▼10.1	5,808.0	▲17.1	4,704	▼8.5
2002	202,576	▼5.3	5,259.0	▼9.5	5,262	▲11.9
2003	214,064	▲5.7	3,564.0	▼32.2	4,056	▼22.9
2004	348,597	▲62.8	3,375.0	▼5.3	7,852	▲93.6
2005	268,985	▼22.8	2,628.0	▼22.1	5,112	▼34.9
2006	319,702	▲18.9	2,190.0	▼16.7	5,336	▲4.4
2007	484,266	▲51.5	1,596.0	▼27.1	6,025	▲12.9
2008	417,879	▼13.7	1,881.0	▲17.9	5,381	▼10.7
2009	374,315	▼10.4	614.0	▼67.4	6,343	▲17.9
2010	541,907	▲44.8	404.0	▼34.2	8,215	▲29.5
2011	916,239	▲69.1	768.4	▲90.2	9,827	▲19.6
2012	787,028	▼14.1	745.1	▼3.0	8,697	▼11.5
2013	558,335	▼29.1	834.0	▲11.9	5,634	▼35.2
2014	470,528	▼15.7	397.3	▼52.4	4,149	▼26.4
2015	158,688	▼66.3	6.0	▼98.5	2,128	▼48.7
2016	238,793	▲50.5	4.0	▼33.3	3,124	▲46.8
2017	303,052	▲26.9	4.0	Steady	3,132	▲0.3
2018	306,948	▲1.3	34.2	▲755.0	3,356	▲7.2
2019	396,640	▲29.2	4.4	▼87.1	3,785	▲12.8
2020	38,758	▼90.2	154.7	▲3415.9	1,171	▼69.1
2021	65,978	▲70.2	0.0	▼100.0	1,388	▲18.5
2022	215,767	▲227.0	29	Steady	2,155	▲55.3

== Ground-Transport ==
=== Road ===
Fellini Airport is located on the SS16 Via Flaminia state road, which runs along the Adriatic coast from Padua to Otranto. North of the airport, just outside Rimini's city centre, the SS16 meets the start of the SS72 state road, which leads to the Sammarinese border at Dogana, from which it continues as the San Marino Highway until Borgo Maggiore, from which the Funivia di San Marino runs to the City of San Marino. The Rimini Sud junction of the tolled A14 motorway, which follows the ancient Via Aemilia northwest to Bologna and runs south along the Adriatic coast to Taranto, is located 800 m (2,600 ft) along the SS72 state road. However, the airport is closer to the Riccione junction, which is the next junction southbound.

The airport contains parking spaces for 300 cars. The city council plans to construct an additional 200-space car park to serve the airport by the Metromare stop.

=== Bus ===
As of 2023, the only bus stopping directly in front of the airport is Start Romagna SpA's route 9, which connects the airport to Rimini's city centre, Rimini Fiera and either Santarcangelo di Romagna or San Vito. The route runs through Rimini's southern residential suburbs and the Colonella district, with stops including the city hospital, the Arch of Augustus, the Monumental Cemetery of Rimini, and Rimini's railway station.

Route 124 stops near the airport on Viale Losanna, on the other side of the SS16 state road. The route connects the airport to Rimini's city centre, Riccione, and Morciano di Romagna.

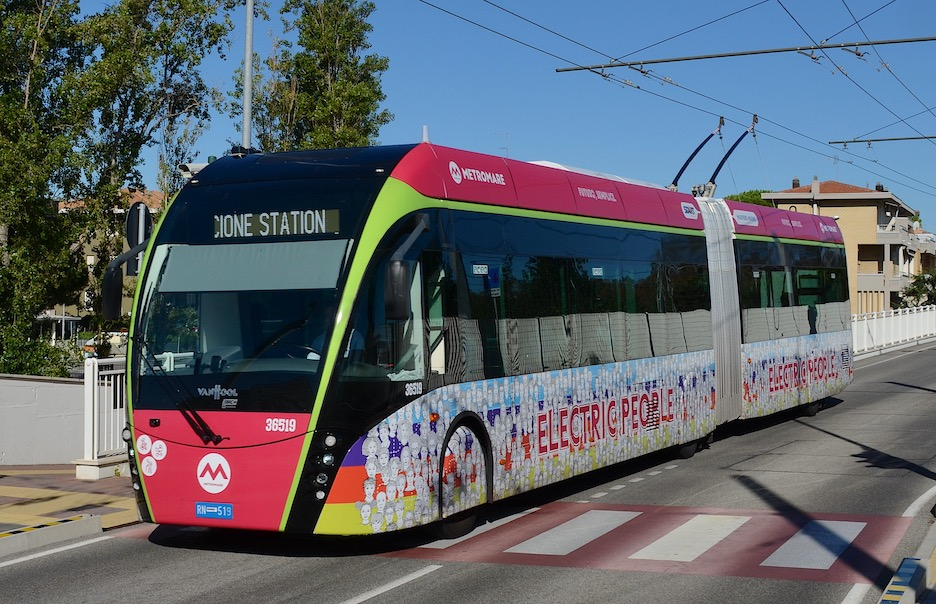
A trolleybus approaches Metromare's Miramare Airport stop in September 2022.

=== Metromare ===
The airport is indirectly connected to the Metromare trolleybus rapid transit line that runs between the railway stations of Rimini and Riccione. The route's Miramare Airport stop is located 825 m (2,707 ft) by road away from the airport entrance. To reach the airport, passengers descending from the Metromare need to go south along the Via Cavalieri di Vittorio Veneto, past the roundabout with Viale Losanna/Viale Felice Carlo Pullè, then northwest along the busy SS16 Via Flaminia state road. At the time of Metromare's launch, the SS16 could not be crossed by foot near the airport. Instead, the route 9M bus connects the stop to the airport.

The lack of a direct connection to the airport from Metromare has been criticised by local politicians. In April 2023, Roberta Frisoni, Rimini's councillor for public transportation, argued that the variability of demand for a direct airport connection – dependent on the times of flights – meant that a shuttle connection between the Metromare stop and airport is more appropriate. In September 2021, the municipal council approved a project that would allow pedestrians to reach the Metromare stop by lit segregated walkways and cross the SS16 by traffic lights. In September 2023, a feasbility study concluded that a covered overground walkway between the airport and stop would cost 13.7 million euros, with annual operating costs of 288,000 euros.

=== Railway ===
The nearest railway stations to the airport are:

- Rimini railway station, which sits at the interchange of the Bologna–Ancona railway with the Ferrara–Rimini railway, and is served by regional, intercity, and high-speed Frecciarossa and Frecciabianca trains. The route 9 bus connects the airport with the station.
- Riccione railway station, which is served by regional, intercity, and high-speed trains on the Bologna–Ancona railway. The route 124 bus stops near the airport and station.
- Rimini Miramare railway station, a minor station which is geographically closest to the airport, but is only served by some regional trains on the Bologna–Ancona railway. The route 9M bus connects the airport with the station.

All three railway stations are served by Metromare.

== Incidents and accidents ==
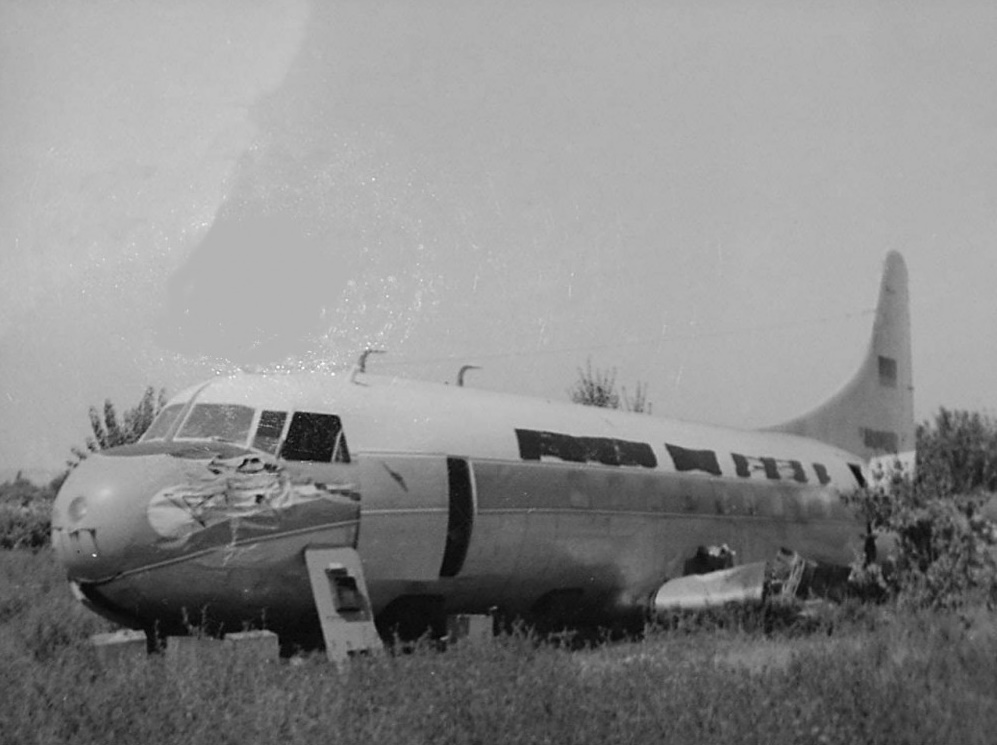
The damaged Convair CV-240, August 1960

Fellini Airport's only fatal accident occurred on 31 July 1960. A Convair CV-240, which had made its maiden flight in 1948, operated by Deutsche Flugdienst was landing on runway 13 at the airport as scheduled from Düsseldorf Airport, with an intermediary stop in Frankfurt Airport. At an altitude of around 5,000 feet (1,500 metres), its left engine stuttered and stalled, followed by the right engine at 1,500 feet (460 metres). The plane was forced to make an emergency landing in a farm 1 kilometre (0.62 miles) northwest of the airport. A right wing hit a tree on landing, and one of its branches struck a window, killing a 24-year-old German tourist on board. Three others were injured: the co-pilot, a stewardess, and a passenger. The aircraft was damaged beyond repair.
