= Padua Airport =

Padua "Gino Allegri" Airport Aeroporto di Padova "Gino Allegri"
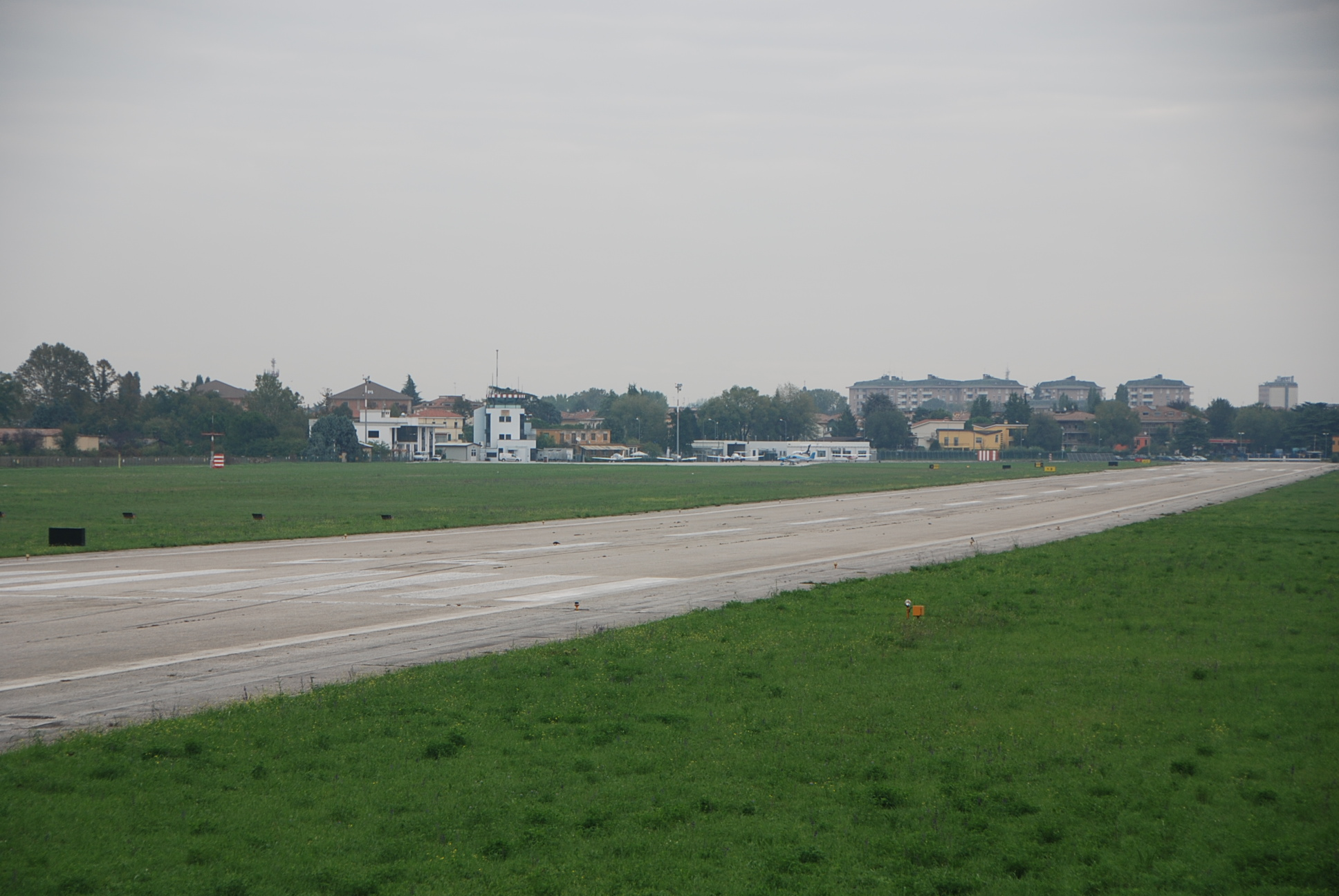
- IATA: none; ICAO: LIPU; WMO: 16095, 16582

Summary
- Airport type: Civil (was military)
- Serves: Padua
- Location: Via Sorio, 89 – 35141
- Elevation AMSL: 44 ft (13 m)
- Coordinates: 45°23′45″N 11°50′53″E
- Website: www.padova-airport.it

Map
- Location in Italy

Runways
Direction	Length		Surface
Direction	ft	m	Surface
04/22	3,681	1,122	Asphalt
- Sources: World Aero Data

Padua "Gino Allegri" Airport (Italian: Aeroporto di Padova "Gino Allegri") (ICAO: LIPU) is an airport serving Padua, Veneto, Italy.

The airport is named after Gino Allegri, an Italian aviator who lost his life while attempting to land in a small airfield in the Province of Padua during World War I.

== See also ==
- List of airports in Italy
