= Collalto, Susegana =

Village in Treviso, Italy

Coordinates: 45.8717°N 12.1982°E

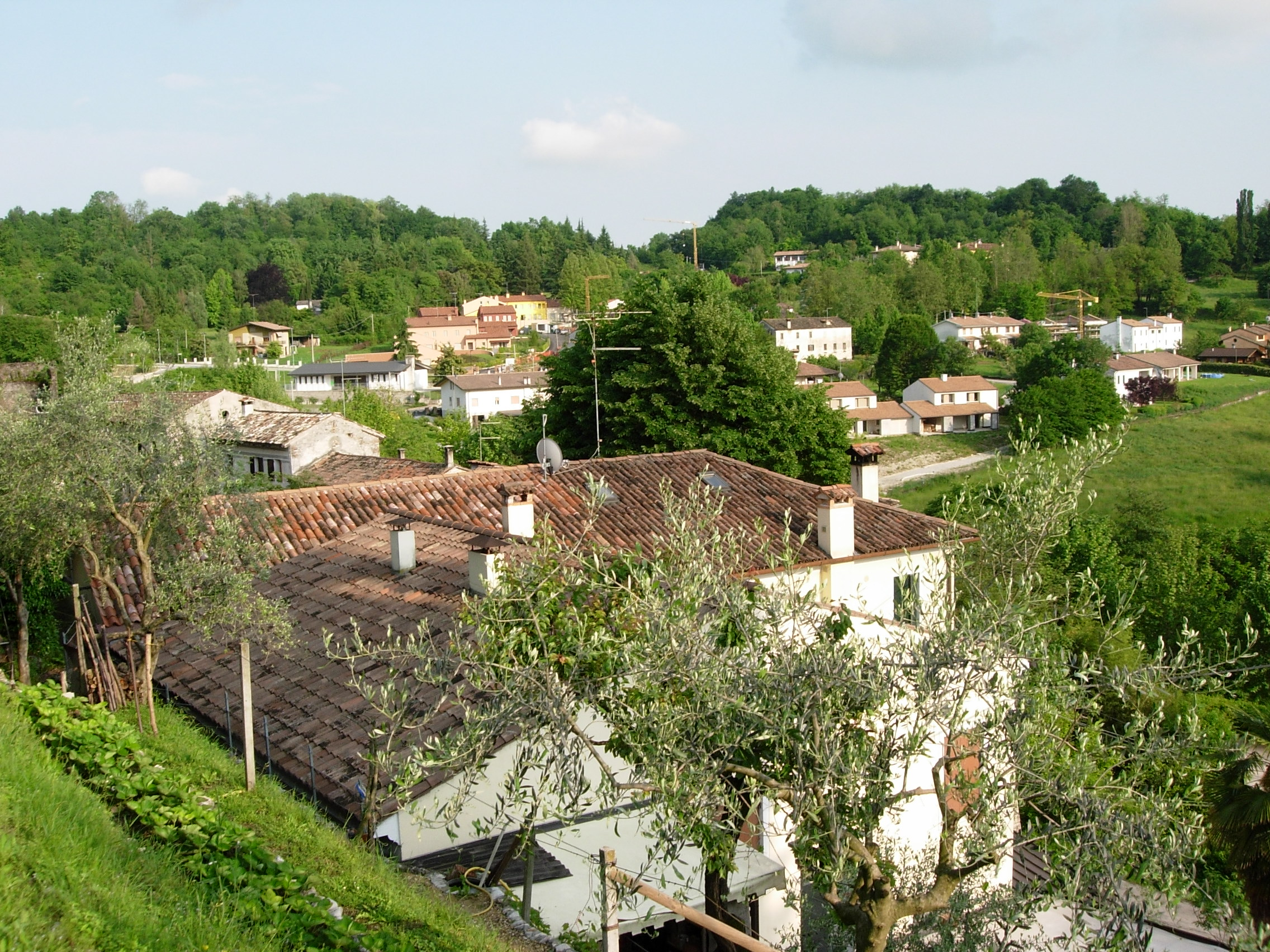
Collalto, Susegana

Collalto is a village in the province of Treviso in northern Italy, forming a 'frazione' or part of the municipality of Susegana.

== Geography ==
At the northern end of the municipality and about 6 kilometres from its capital, the territory of Collalto is mainly hilly and wooded. At its highest point it overlooks the Piave Quarter and the vast Pieve di Soligo plain, its hills and the Bellunes Alps. A long nature walk along the Collalto-via Tombola road connects Collalto castle with the Castello di San Salvatore e Susegana.

== History ==
There is evidence of human occupation at Collalto in the prehistoric period and it later gained some importance as a mercantile route, as shown by ancient Roman bridge in Mercatelli Colfosco near Sant'Anna church - it is overgrown with vegetation but the central arch survives, possibly forming part of the Via Claudia Augusta across the Passo Praderadego or Valdobbiadene and connecting the Venetian plain with Belluno. The area had a cult of the warrior saints saint George and saint Martin, possibly pointing to an early Lombard settlement in the area, though the first documentary evidence for a settlement comes from the 12th century, with the foundation of a small fort which formed the nucleus for the present-day castle.

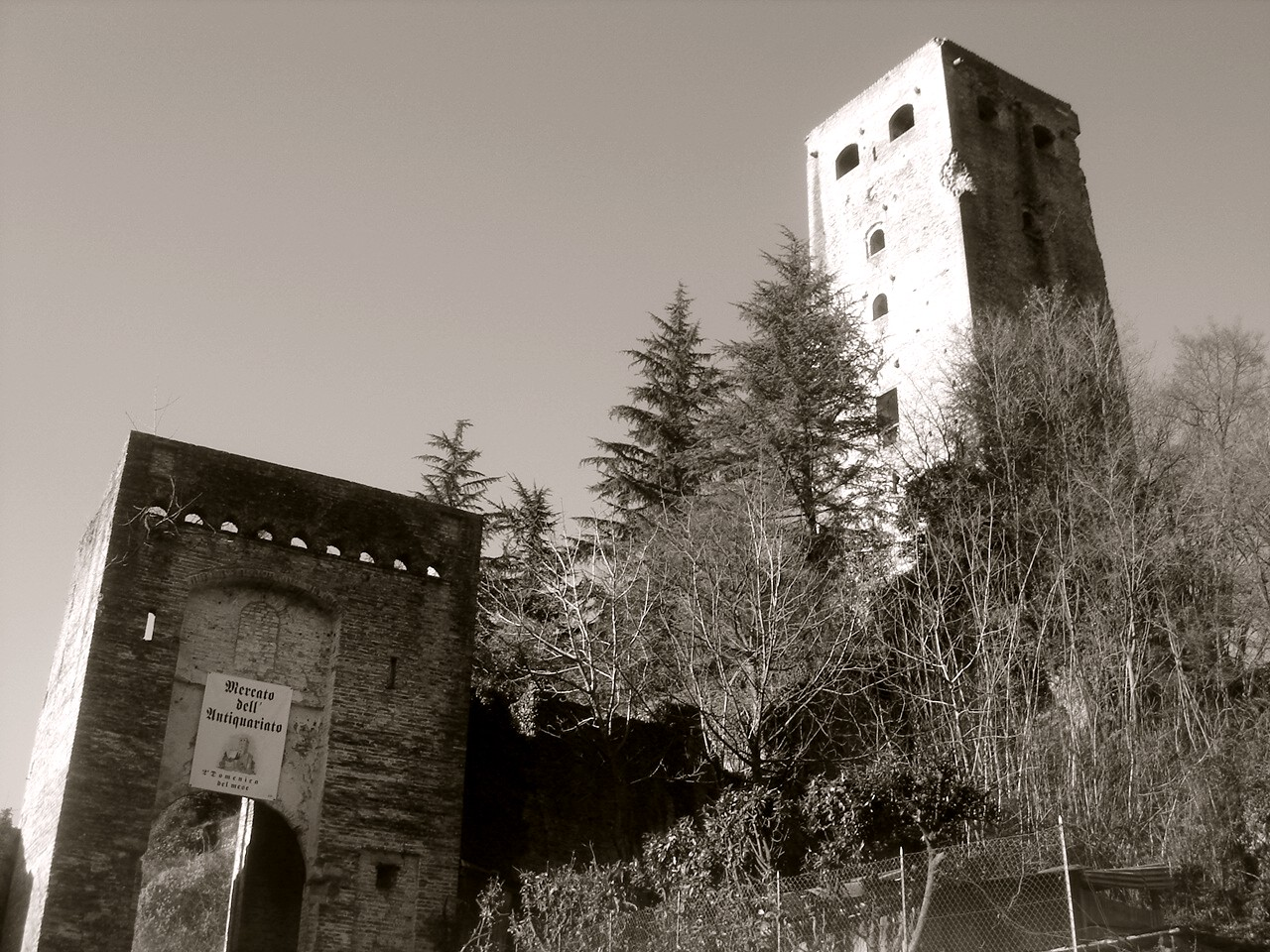
The castle and its old gateway

Trevisan nobles took this fort and castle on the 'High Hill' or Colle Alto as their seat - Ensedisio I is considered as the castle's founder in 1110 and it became a fiefdom of the house of Collalto, entrusted with controlling the lords of Piave. The castle was frequently attacked and damaged, especially by the rival Da Camino family. In 1245 the counts also acquired the hill at San Salvatore, also in Susegana, where count Raimbaut VIII Collalto built a castle shortly afterwards, which led to a decline in Collalto's military importance. In 1312 the family's feudal rights were confirmed by Arrigo VII. The castle at Collalto controlled the towns of Barbisano, Falzè di Piave and Sernaglia, whilst that at San Salvatore did the same for Colfosco, Refrontolo, Santa Lucia and Susegana. Blessed Giuliana di Collalto was born either in Susegana or in the castle in 1186.

With the rise of the Republic of Venice and the ensuing period of peace, the castle lost what remained of its importance and became a Franciscan monastery and important cultural centre, hosting artists such as il Pordenone and Francesco da Milano. With the arrival of Napoleon, Collalto was demoted from a noble seat to merely a frazione of San Salvador (now known as Susegana), whilst the monastery was suppressed and converted into a mill. This began a slow decline which culminated during the First World War - the settlement was on the Piave front and the town and monastery were both almost completely destroyed by Italian artillery firing from Montello, though the tower survived. The Susegana-Pieve di Soligo tramway (run by the Società Veneta until 1931) was also severely damaged in the war - Collalto had been given a stop on its route in 1913 and the line temporarily became a military railway during the war, with an extension to Revine Lago.

The castle could not be restored after the war (traces of its walls still survive, but otherwise Collalto revived in the inter-war period - in 1927 the current parish church was opened, designed by Domenico Rupolo - it was restored in 2009.
