= Susegana-Pieve di Soligo tramway =

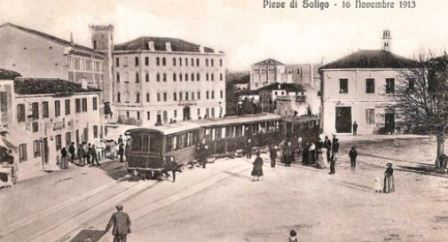
Inauguration of the Susegana-Pieve di Soligo tramway on 16 November 1913

The Susegana-Pieve di Soligo tramway (tranvia Susegana-Pieve di Soligo) was a goods and passenger tramway between Susegana and Pieve di Soligo in Italy.

Plans for it were first presented by the Società Veneta per le imprese e costruzioni pubbliche on 15 October 1908, though it only opened on 16 November 1913. It was severely damaged early in the First World War and the Austro-Hungarian occupying forces closed it after their defeat at the battle of Caporetto. They then provisionally rebuilt it as a military field railway and extended to Follina, Revine Lago and Falzè di Piave. After the armistice the Società Veneta declared themselves unable to reconstruct it, so this was taken on at state expense. It was officially closed in 1931, though photographic evidence suggests that it was already closed by 1922.
