= Soligo =

Soligo may refer to:

- Soligo, Farra di Soligo, a frazione of Farra di Soligo
- Soligo (river)
- Soligo (surname)
