= Castello di San Salvatore =

Castello di San Salvatore may refer to:

- Castello San Salvatore, a castle in Susegana, Veneto
- Forte del Santissimo Salvatore, a fort in Messina, Sicily
