= Giuliana of Collalto =

Italian Benedictine nun

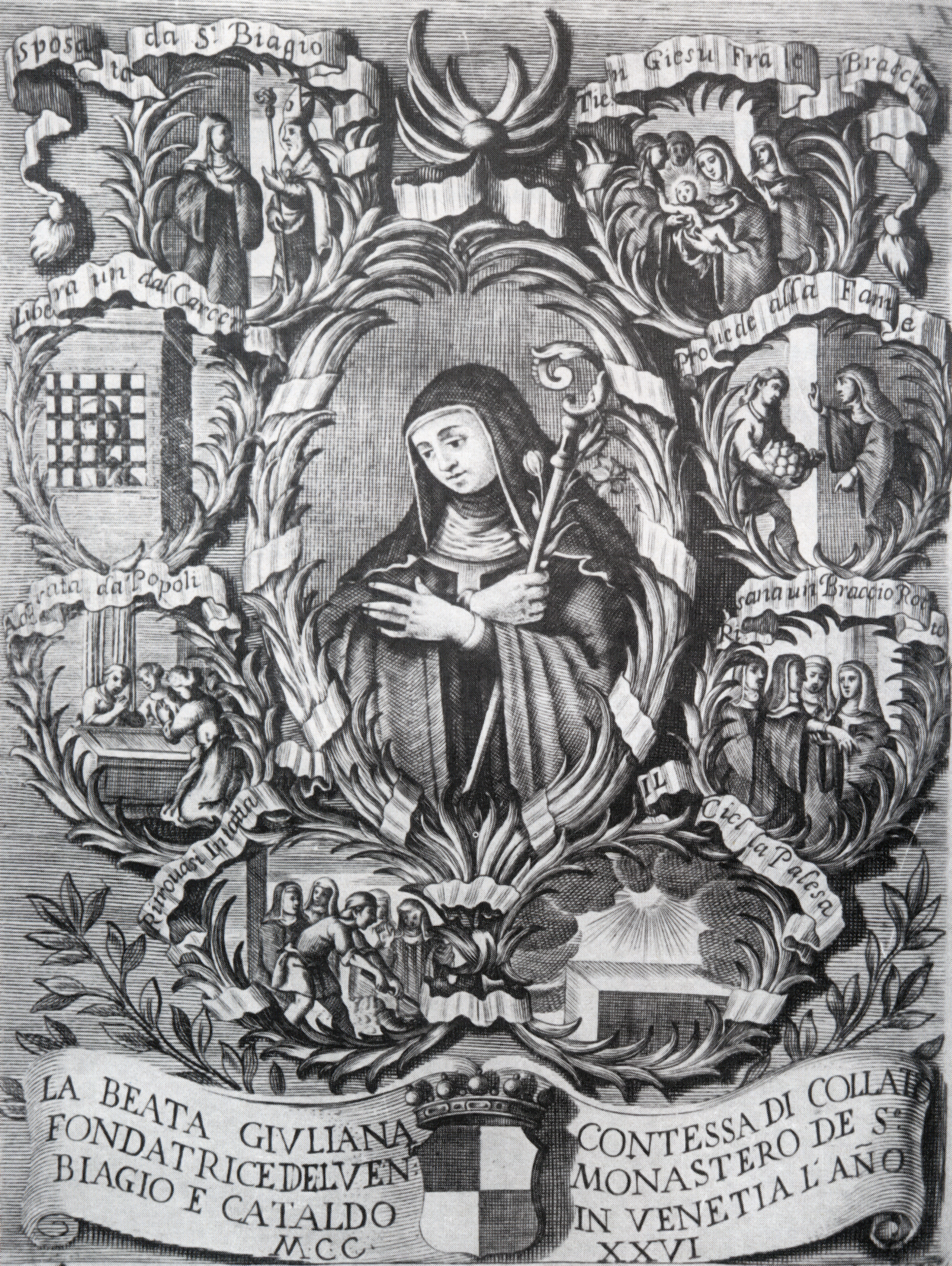
An anonymous lithograph of Blessed Giuliana of Collalto.

Giuliana of Collalto (c. 1186 in Collalto, Susegana – September 1, 1262 in Venice) was an Italian Benedictine nun. She was beatified in 1743 by Pope Benedict XIV.

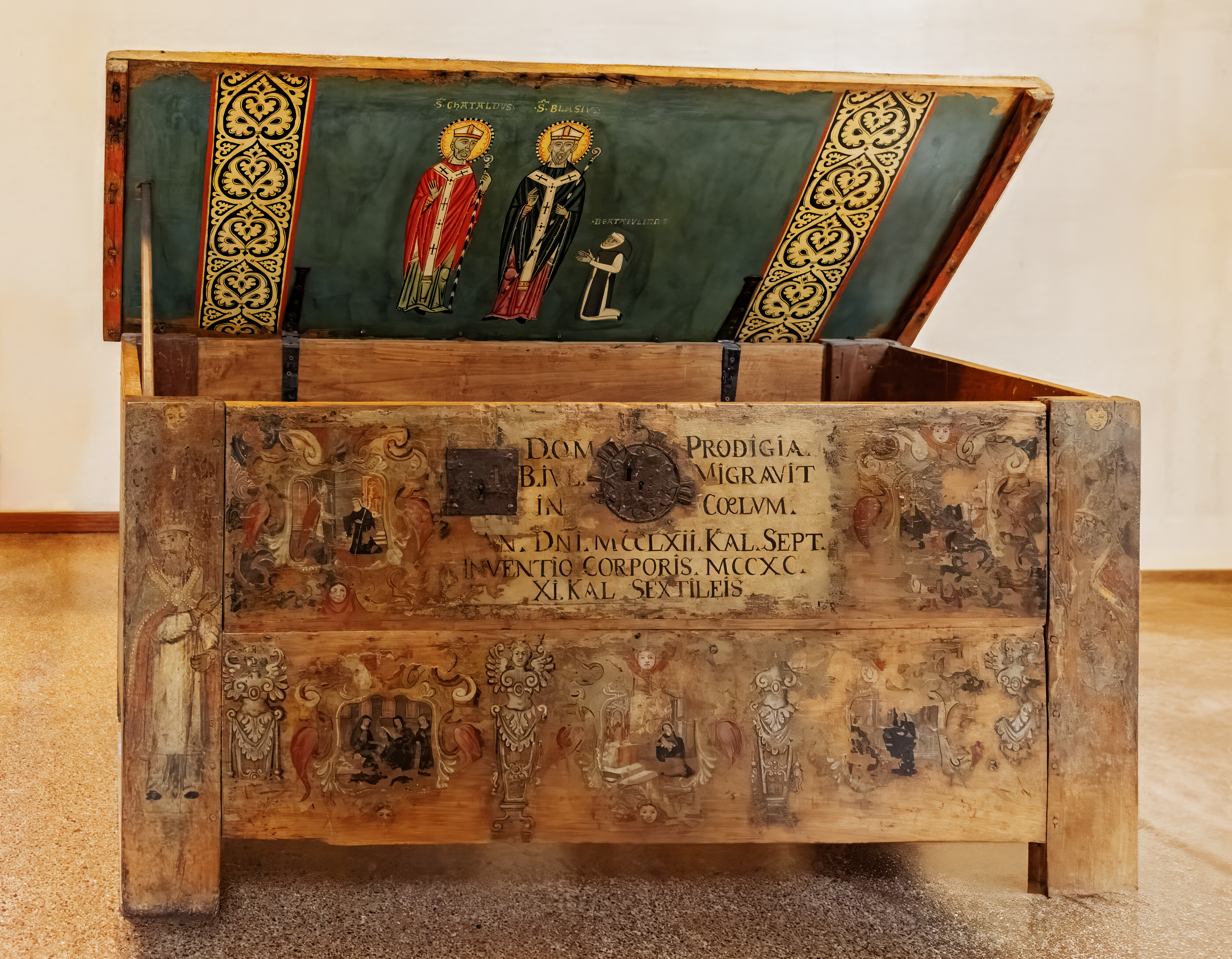
Reliquary chest of the Blessed Giuliana of Collalto - Correr Museum

== Life ==
She was the daughter of Rambaldo VI di Collalto, count of Treviso, and his wife Giovanna, from the Mantuan House of Monte Sant'Angelo. She was born in the family seat of the House of Collalto in the town of the same name.

She became a nun at a young age and met Beatrice I d'Este in the Santa Margherita Convent on mount Salarola (Calaone). She moved to the convent on the Giudecca in Venice where she rebuilt the church of San Cataldo with its monastic annex and became its abbess. She died in 1262 and was buried in the church's cemetery, although her body was translated to its current resting place in the church of Sant'Eufemia, Venice in 1822.

A church dedicated to the blessed Giuliana can be found in Brtnice, Czech Rep. on the former fideicommissum property of the Collalto house in Bohemia.
