= Lakes of Revine Lago =

Overview of the Revine Lago Lakes in the province of Treviso, Italy

Santa Maria Lake
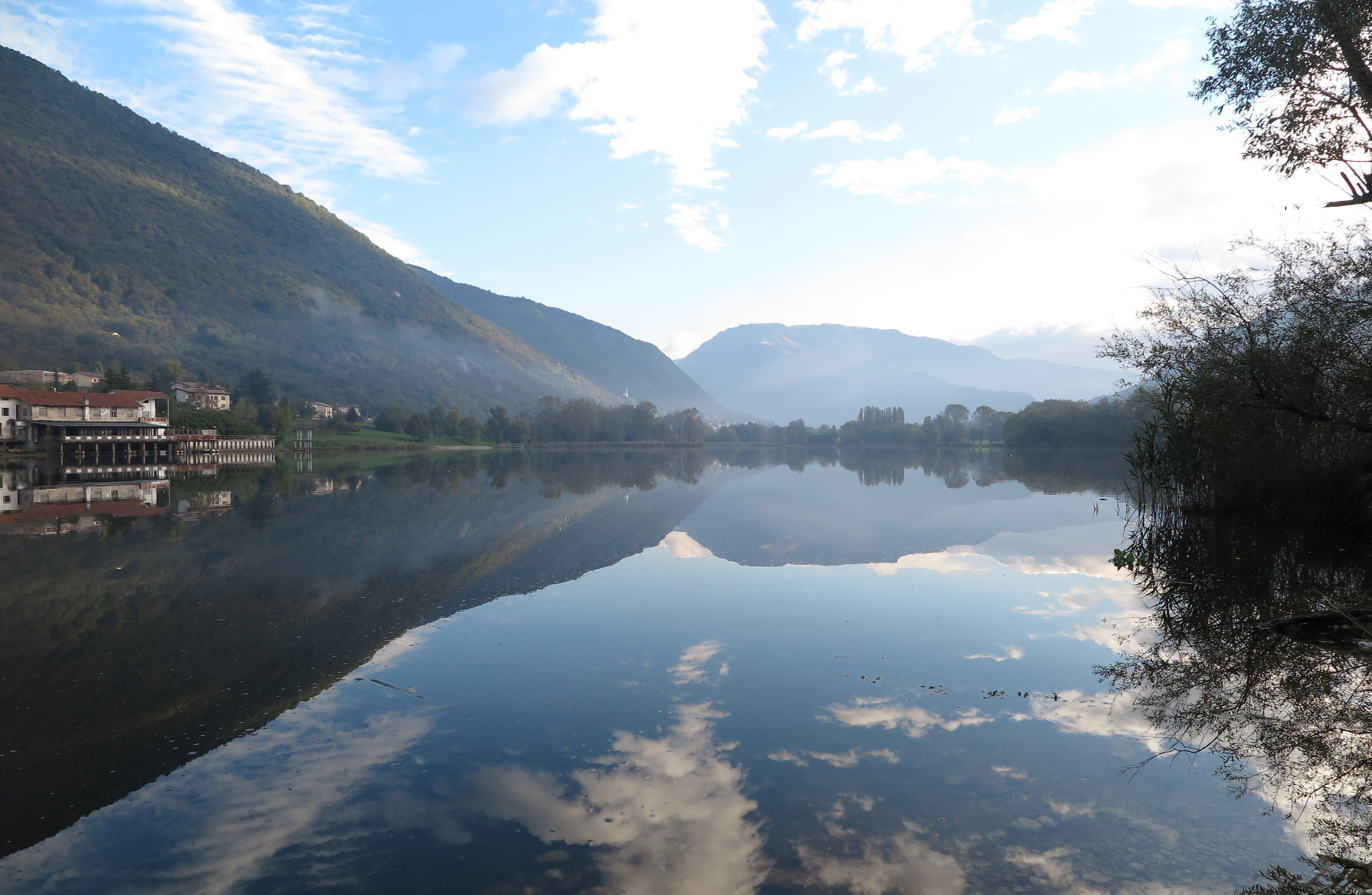
- Interactive map of Santa Maria Lake
- Location: Veneto, Italy
- Coordinates: 45.9902°N 12.2363°E
- Primary outflows: Canale delle Barche
- Max. length: 1.05 metres (3 ft 5 in)
- Max. width: 0.2–0.5 metres (7.9 in – 1 ft 7.7 in)
- Surface area: 0.4 metres (1 ft 4 in)
- Average depth: 4.3 metres (14 ft)

Lago Lake
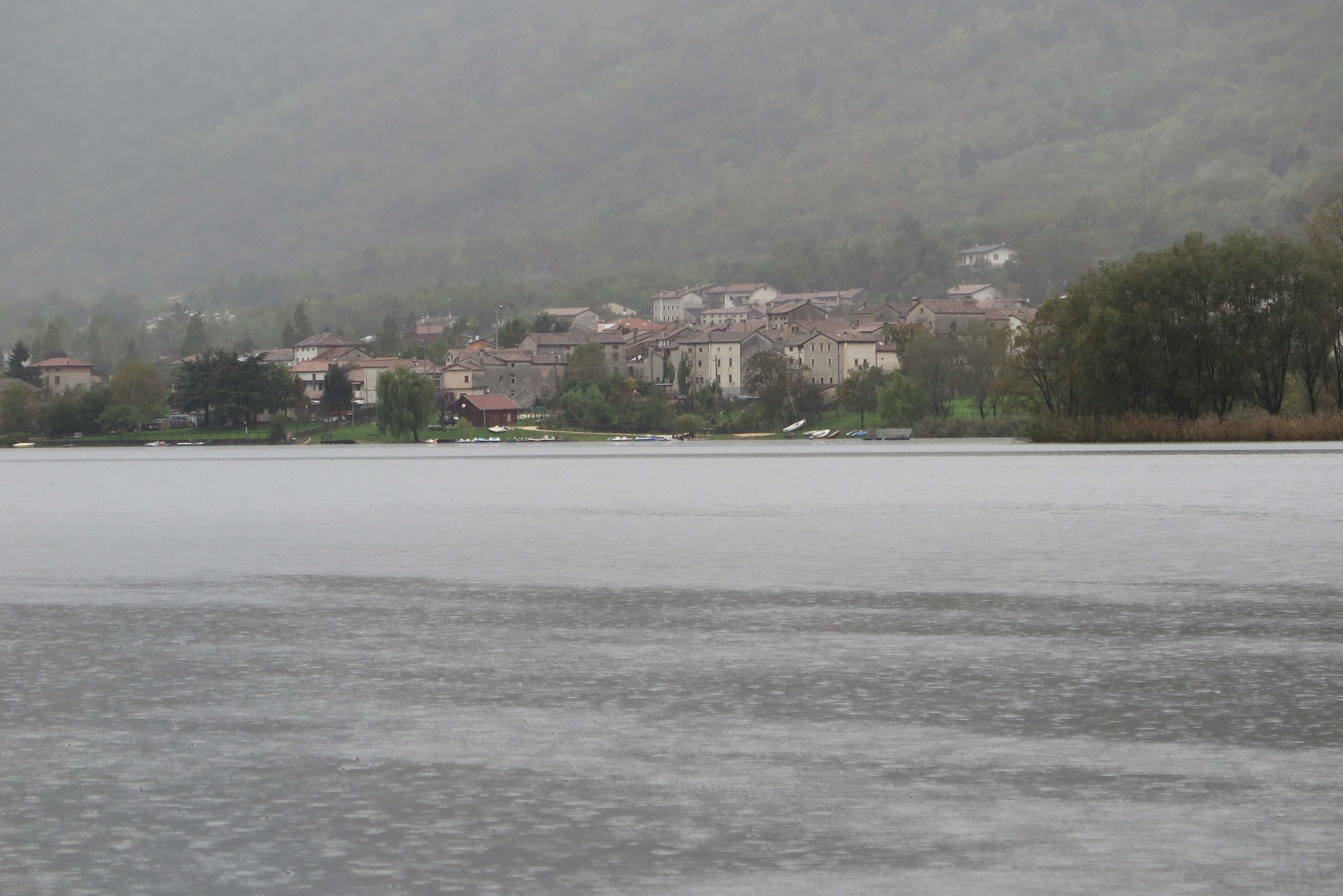
- Interactive map of Lago Lake
- Location: Veneto, Italy
- Primary inflows: Canale delle Barche, Piaveson stream
- Primary outflows: La Tajada (Soligo)
- Max. length: 1.20 metres (3 ft 11 in)
- Max. width: 0.3–0.5 metres (1 ft 0 in – 1 ft 8 in)
- Surface area: 0.5 metres (1 ft 8 in)
- Average depth: 7.2 metres (24 ft)
- Settlements: Revine Lago, Tarzo

The Revine Lago Lakes are two bodies of water in the Province of Treviso in Veneto, Italy. They are located at the bottom of the Vallata Trevigiana, divided between the municipalities of Revine Lago and Tarzo.

Specifically, these are the Santa Maria Lake, to the east, and the Lago Lake (or San Giorgio Lake), to the west. The basins are separated by a marshy area of 200-300 meters and are connected by the Canale delle Barche.

Several hamlets surround them: on Santa Maria Lake, Santa Maria, Revine Lago to the north and Colmaggiore to the south; on Lago Lake, Lago, Revine Lago to the north and Fratta, Tarzo to the south.

== Santa Maria Lake ==
Santa Maria Lake is the less substantial of the coordinated elements forming a functional unit, both due to its smaller size compared to Lago Lake and because of the reduced water turnover, which in recent times relied solely on underground springs. These are visible in colder seasons when water pools are identifiable on the frozen lake where the water does not freeze. In recent years, the areas where water veins emerged seem to have become obstructed, likely due to sediment from small streams forming during rainy periods and the disappearance of the sedimentation zone.

== Lago Lake ==
Lago Lake is in a more favorable condition due to the support of the Piaveson stream, fed by a particular temporary karst spring that supplies abundant water, allowing greater oxygenation through water turnover. Currently, from a hydrological perspective, Santa Maria Lake drains into Lago Lake, which, through the Tajada, contributes at Follina to the formation, along with the Santa Scolastica spring, of the Soligo river. Its artificial outflow is the Tajada, a channel that regulates the lakes' water levels during flood periods and is notable for its flora and fauna typical of wet and marshy environments.

== History ==
After the Würm glaciation, a single body of water formed at the valley's bottom (originally occupying the entire area up to Gai, Cison di Valmarino in Cison di Valmarino) and remained so until the 13th-14th century. In the first half of the 15th century, the westernmost portion was drained and reclaimed, an operation linked to the excavation of the Tajada, which serves as the outflow for Lago Lake, channeling its waters to the Soligo. This led to the formation of two basins: Lago Lake to the east and Soller Lake to the west. Subsequent interventions (the last in the 20th century) drained Soller Lake as well, and part of Lago Lake was separated, forming Santa Maria Lake.

The Revine Lago Lakes were sites of conflict during the First and Second World Wars. In the First World War, after the Battle of Caporetto, Revine Lago was invaded by Austrian soldiers between November 1917 and the summer of 1918, marking the end of the war. Violent clashes with the enemy occurred in neighboring towns, including Revine Lago, culminating on October 30, 1918, with the Battle of Revine at Col de la Spina. During the 1918 occupation, a double-wire cableway was built from the Serravalle castle to Con (a hamlet of Serravalle), then to Masieron (on the border of Serravalle), to the Bridòt hamlet, and finally to Lame in Revine, where a small station was located.

=== Colmaggiore site ===
The first evidence of a prehistoric settlement dates to 1923, when a Sauerbrunn-type bronze sword from the mid-Bronze Age (15th century BC) was found during the excavation of the channel now connecting the two lakes.

In 1987, further excavations in the same area uncovered the first remains of residential structures. The Veneto Archaeological Superintendency was alerted, conducting initial surveys in 1989, followed by excavations in 1992 and 1997. Based on the data, the remains were attributed to a prehistoric wetland settlement, first established in the Neolithic (circa 4500 BC) and later occupied during the Copper Age until the early Bronze Age (2300 BC).

The collected artifacts belonged to various material classes, contributing to the site's relative dating and understanding of the daily life of its inhabitants. Among the most significant finds are remains of vertical pilings, charred wooden fragments, wooden planks, and stone foundations, interpreted as foundations of stilt houses and evidence of shore reclamation. Everyday objects include chipped flint tools, polished greenstone artifacts, and terracotta remains (bowls, jars, pots, handles, incised decorations, strainers) used for storing, cooking, and consuming food. The discovery of spindle whorls and a loom weight indicates that the inhabitants practiced weaving.

The Livelet Educational Archaeological Park was designed and built to highlight the discovery of the nearby Colmaggiore site.

== Fauna and flora ==
The lakes' morphology, hydrology and sediment composition, characterised in large part by peat-rich deposits, have strongly influenced the structure of their aquatic and shoreline vegetation. They display a typical zonation of macrophyte communities, ranging from a variably developed outer marsh and sedge belt to extensive reed beds dominated by Phragmites and Scirpus, followed by zones of floating-leaved plants such as Nuphar and Nymphaea, and a well-defined assemblage of submerged species including Potamogeton, Myriophyllum and Najas. A deeper vegetation zone dominated by charophytes has been hypothesised but remains uncertain. The distribution and richness of these plant communities vary according to shoreline slope, depth and substrate, with the most diverse associations occurring where fine, peat-rich sediments and gently sloping lake bottoms are present.

A 2005 study of phytoplankton in the two connected eutrophic Laghi di Revine in north-eastern Italy found that the algal communities in these shallow lakes displayed distinct taxonomic diversity patterns despite their hydrological connection. The research, which compared species composition between the lakes, documented differences in abundance and dominance of phytoplankton taxa reflective of local physical and chemical conditions, illustrating how eutrophic status and lake morphology can influence the structure of microscopic primary producers in closely linked water bodies. These findings contribute to understanding phytoplankton dynamics in nutrient-rich lacustrine systems and underscore the importance of small lake studies for broader limnological assessments.
