= Transfiguration (Pordenone) =

Painting by Pordenone

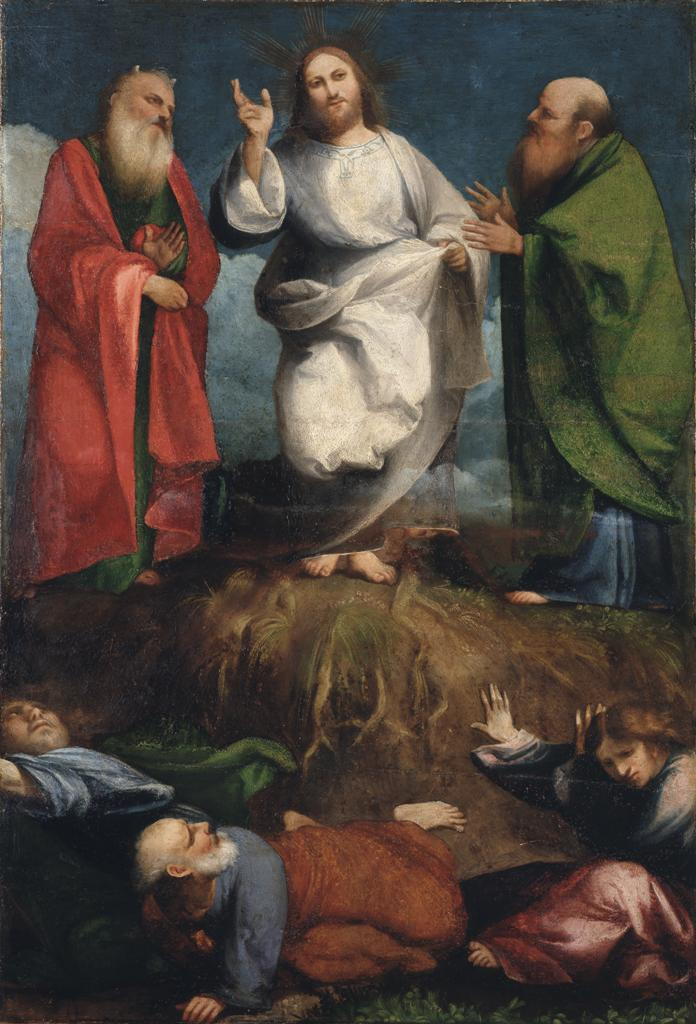

Transfiguration is a c. 1515–1516 tempera on panel painting by Pordenone, now in the Pinacoteca di Brera in Milan.

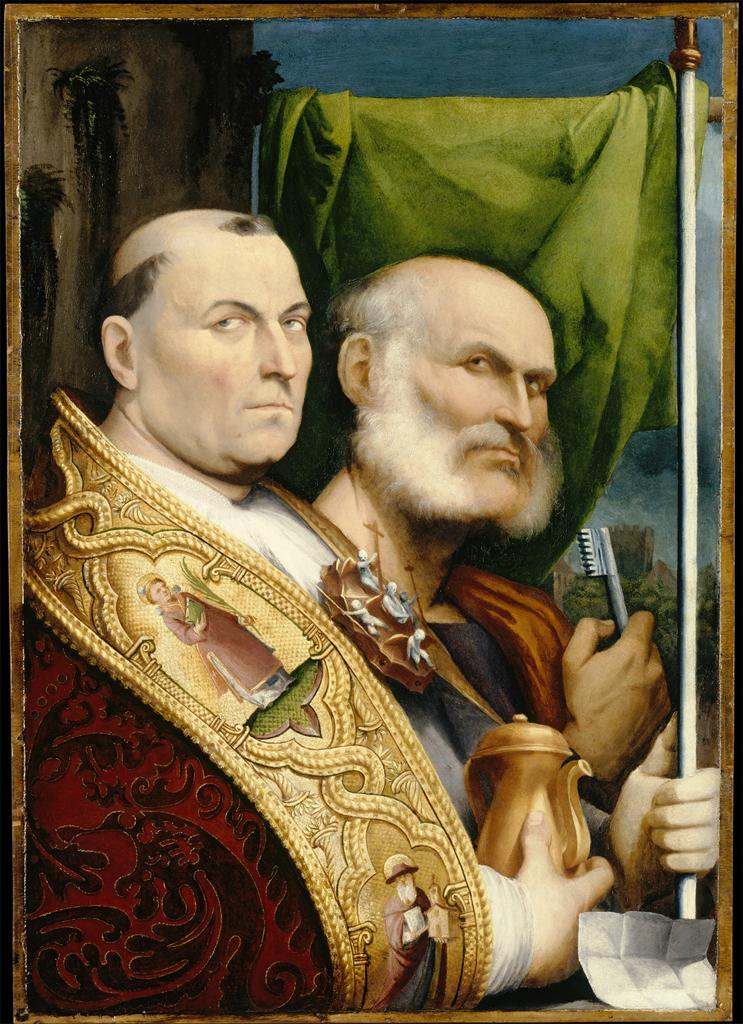
Raleigh - North Carolina Museum of Art - Saint Prosdocimus and Saint Peter.

It originally formed the central panel of a triptych for San Salvatore church in Collalto near Treviso. Each side panel showed a pair of saints - Saint Prosdocimus and Saint Peter (North Carolina Museum of Art) and Saint John the Baptist and Saint Jerome (now lost). Its colouring prefigures that of Giorgione
