= Società Veneta =

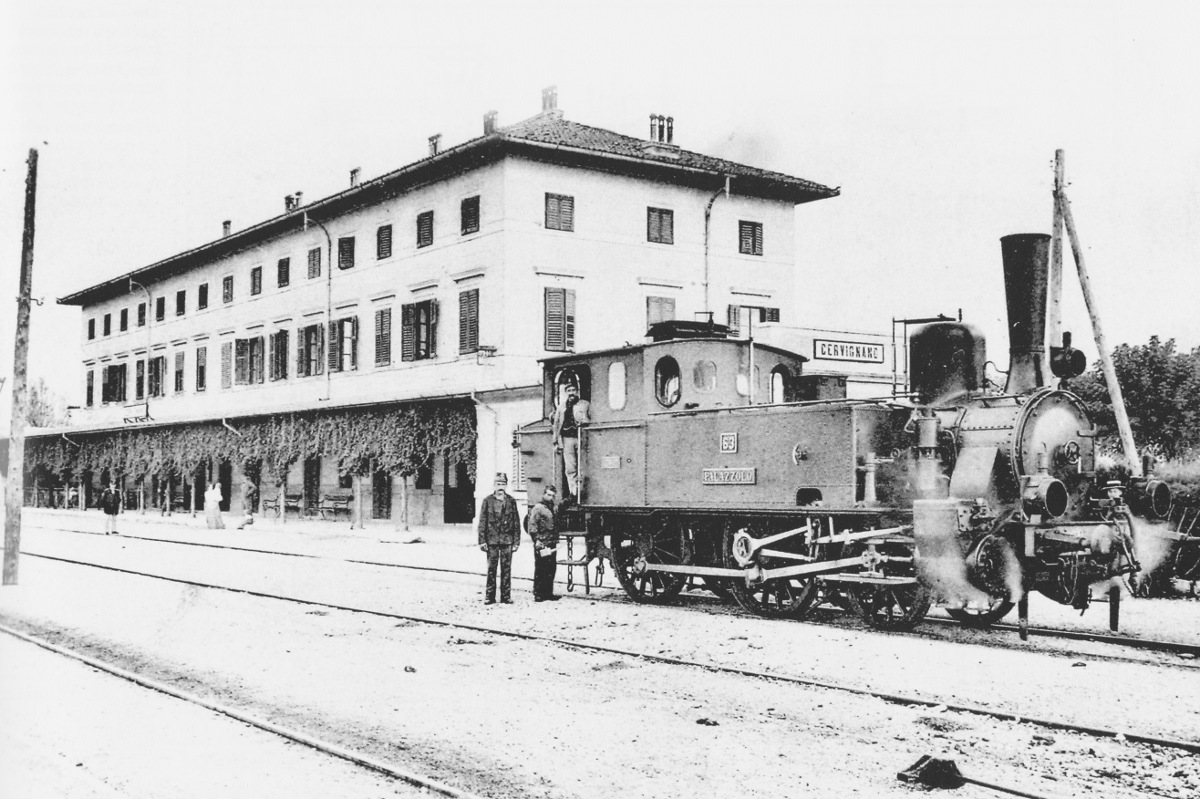
Locomotive no. 63 Palazzolo at Cervignano station, c. 1906

The Società Veneta (SV) was an Italian public transport company running trains and tramways. Its initial full name was the Società Veneta per le imprese e costruzioni pubbliche (Società Veneta for public business and construction), though from 1898 to 1977 it was known as the Società Veneta per la costruzione e l'esercizio di ferrovie secondarie italiane (Società Veneta for the construction and running of Italian secondary railways).

== History ==
It was formed in Padua on 11 January 1872 and also worked on the construction of housing and other railway-related buildings and infrastructure. In the first half of the 20th century it was the largest railway operating company in Italy, managing lines in central and northern Italy. The company effectively ceased operation in 1986 but the section between Venice and San Giorgio di Nogaro is now part of the Venice–Trieste railway.

== Routes ==
=== Standard gauge railways ===
Line	Start of SV operation	End of SV operation	Region	Notes
Vicenza–Schio	1876	1906	Veneto	Passed to FS
Treviso–Vicenza	1877	1906	Veneto	Passed to FS
Padova–Bassano	1877	1906	Veneto	Passed to FS
Conegliano–Vittorio Veneto	1879	1937	Veneto	Passed to FS
Albano–Nettuno	1884	1891	Lazio	
Parma–Suzzara	1885	1986	Emilia-Romagna	1885: SV concession from FPS; 1986: Passed to commissioners
Udine–Cividale	1886	1986	Friuli-Venezia Giulia	Passed to commissioners
Camposampiero–Montebelluna	1886	1909	Veneto	Passed to FS
Bologna–Portomaggiore	1887	1986	Emilia-Romagna	Passed to commissioners
Budrio–Massa Lombarda	1887	1964	Emilia-Romagna	Closed
Arezzo–Stia	1888	1950	Toscana	Passed to LFI
Udine–Palmanova-San Giorgio di Nogaro	1888	1920	Friuli-Venezia Giulia	Passed to FS
Portogruaro–San Giorgio di Nogaro	1888	1920	Veneto; Friuli-Venezia Giulia	Passed to FS
Roma–Albano	1889	1891	Lazio	
San Giorgio di Nogaro–Cervignano	1897	1920	Friuli-Venezia Giulia	Passed to FS
Ferrara–Copparo	1903	1956	Emilia-Romagna	Closed
Thiene–Rocchette	1907	1964	Veneto	Closed
Alessandria–Ovada	1907	1913	Piemonte	
Primolano–Mestre	1908-10	1912	Veneto	Passed to FS
Modena–Ferrara	1909-16	1956	Emilia-Romagna	Closed
Verona–Caprino/Garda	1910	1924	Veneto	Line taken over by the province of Verona in 1924
Carnia–Villa Santina	1910	1968	Friuli-Venezia Giulia	Closed, passenger service withdrawn in 1960
Decima–San Giovanni in Persiceto	1911	1947	Emilia-Romagna	Closed
Cervignano–Ponte Isonzo	1915	1920	Friuli-Venezia Giulia	Passed to FS
Cervignano–Pontile per Grado	1915	1918	Friuli-Venezia Giulia	Passed to FS
Piove di Sacco–Adria	1916	1986	Veneto	Passed to commissioners
Palmanova–Cervignano	1917	1920	Friuli-Venezia Giulia	Passed to FS
Mestre–Piove di Sacco	1931	1986	Veneto	Passed to commissioners
Rocchette–Arsiero	1933	1964	Veneto	1933: Reconstruction of an existing 950 mm gauge railway 1964: Closed
Adria–Ariano Polesine	1942	1944	Veneto	Closed

Maps

Vicenza-Schio railway

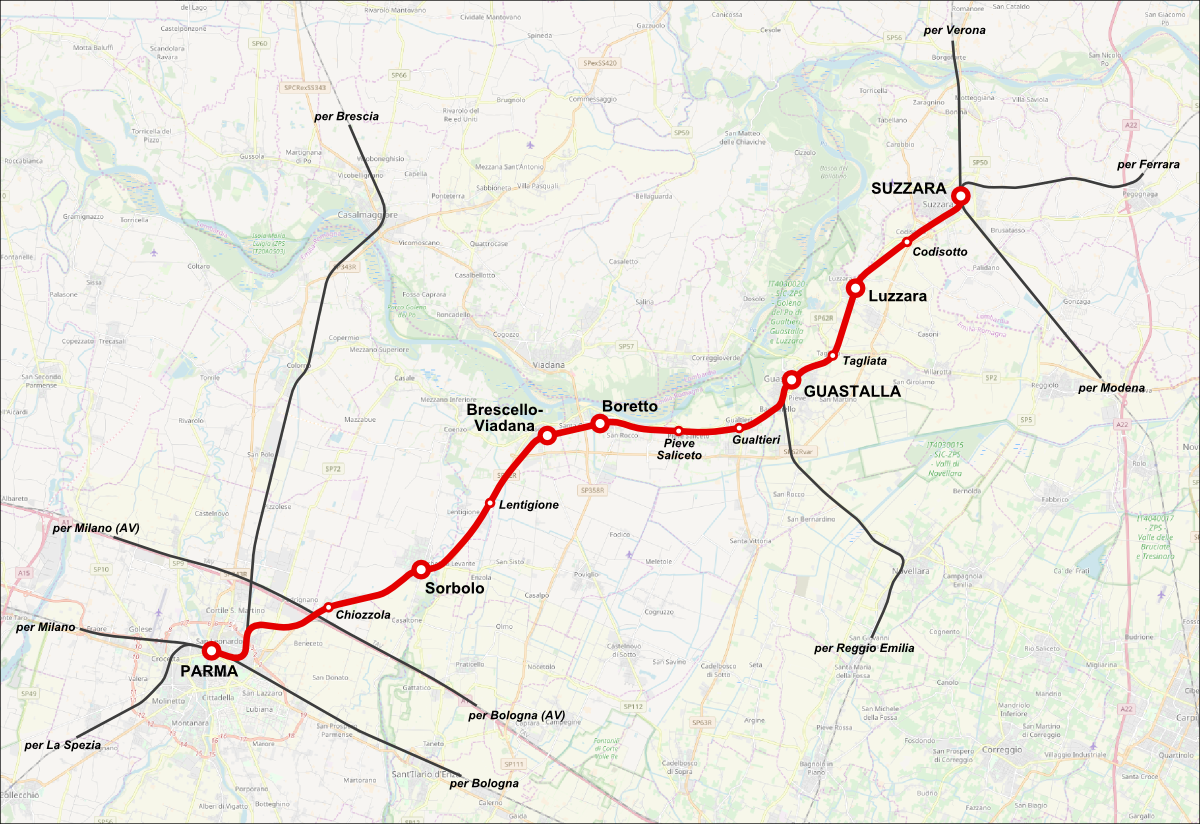
Parma-Suzzara railway

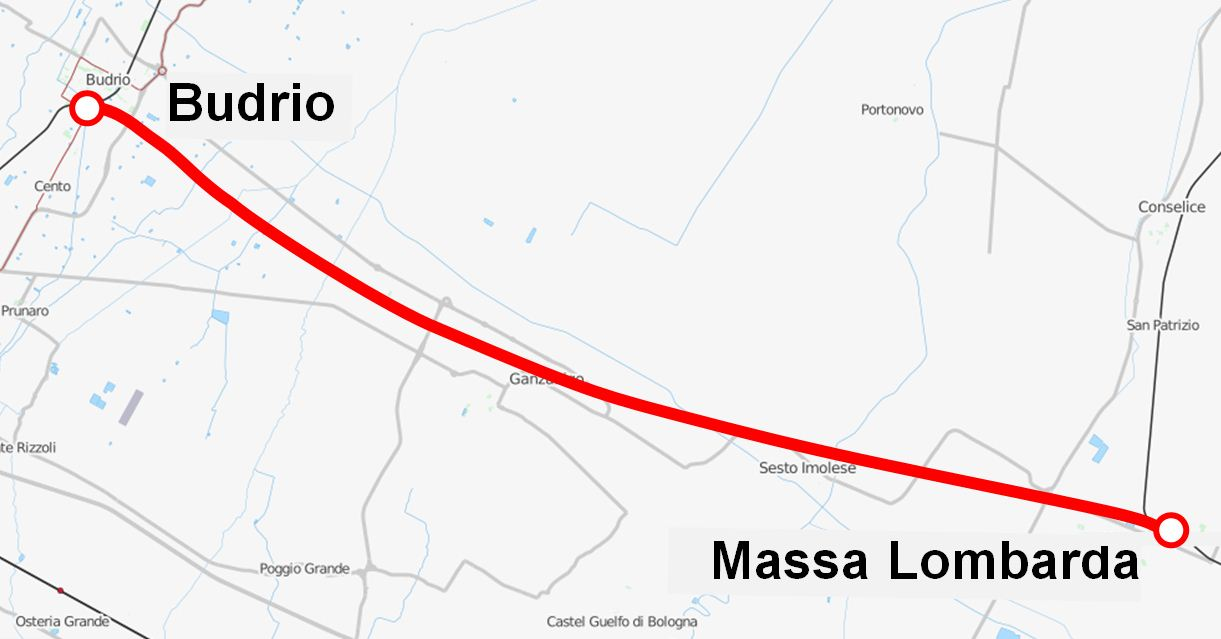
Budrio-Massalombarda railway

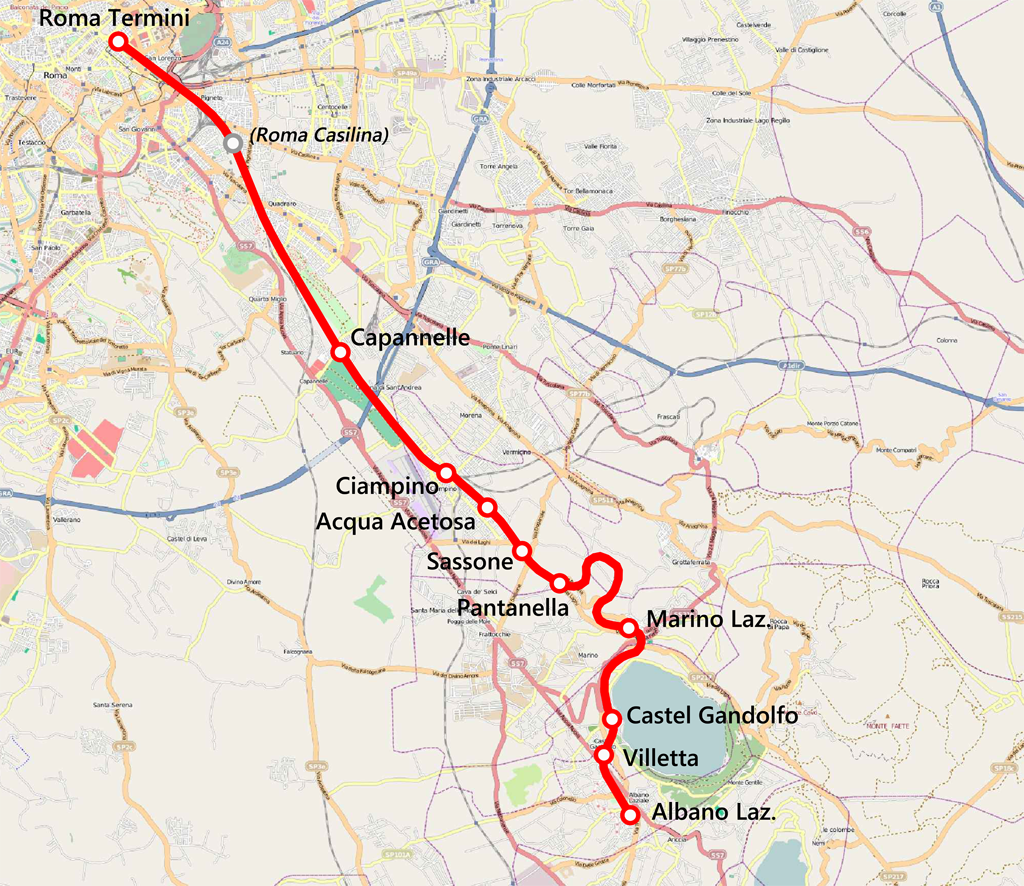
Roma Albano railway

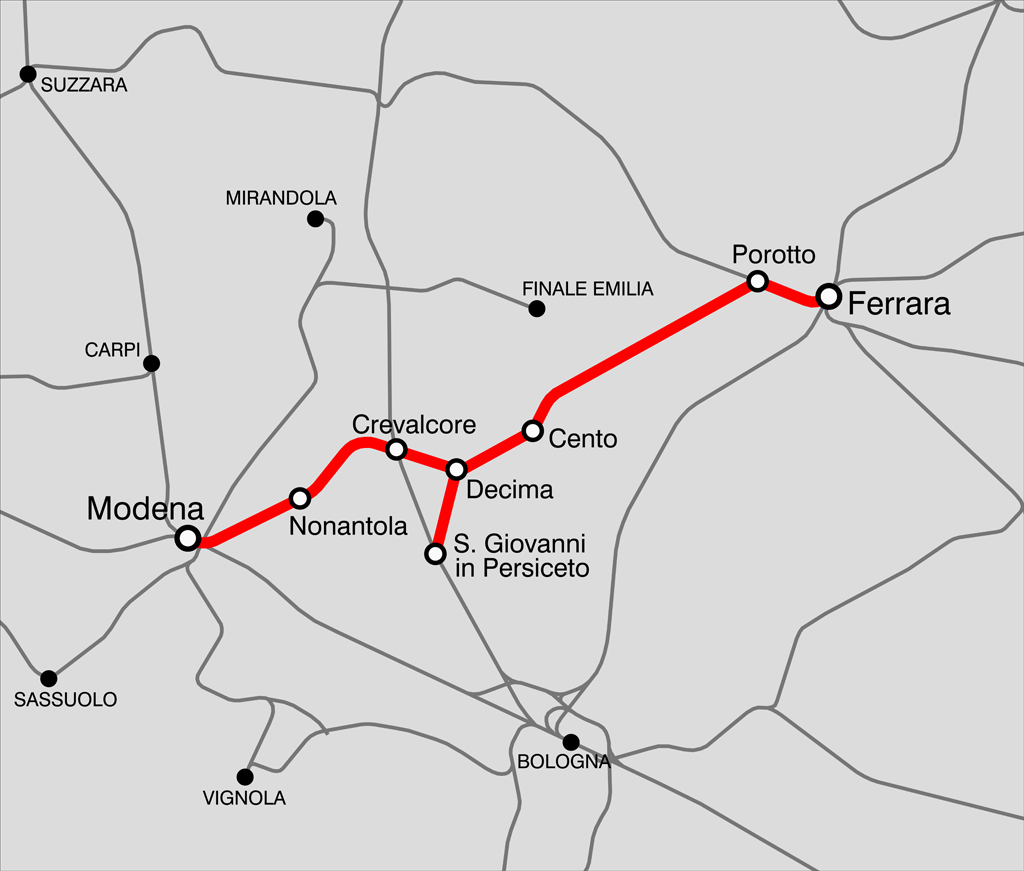
Modena-Ferrara railway

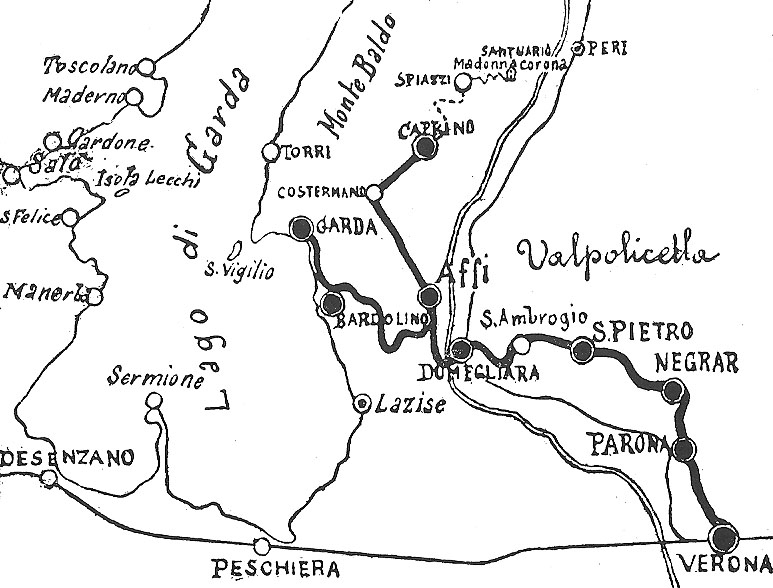
Verona-Caprino/Garda railway

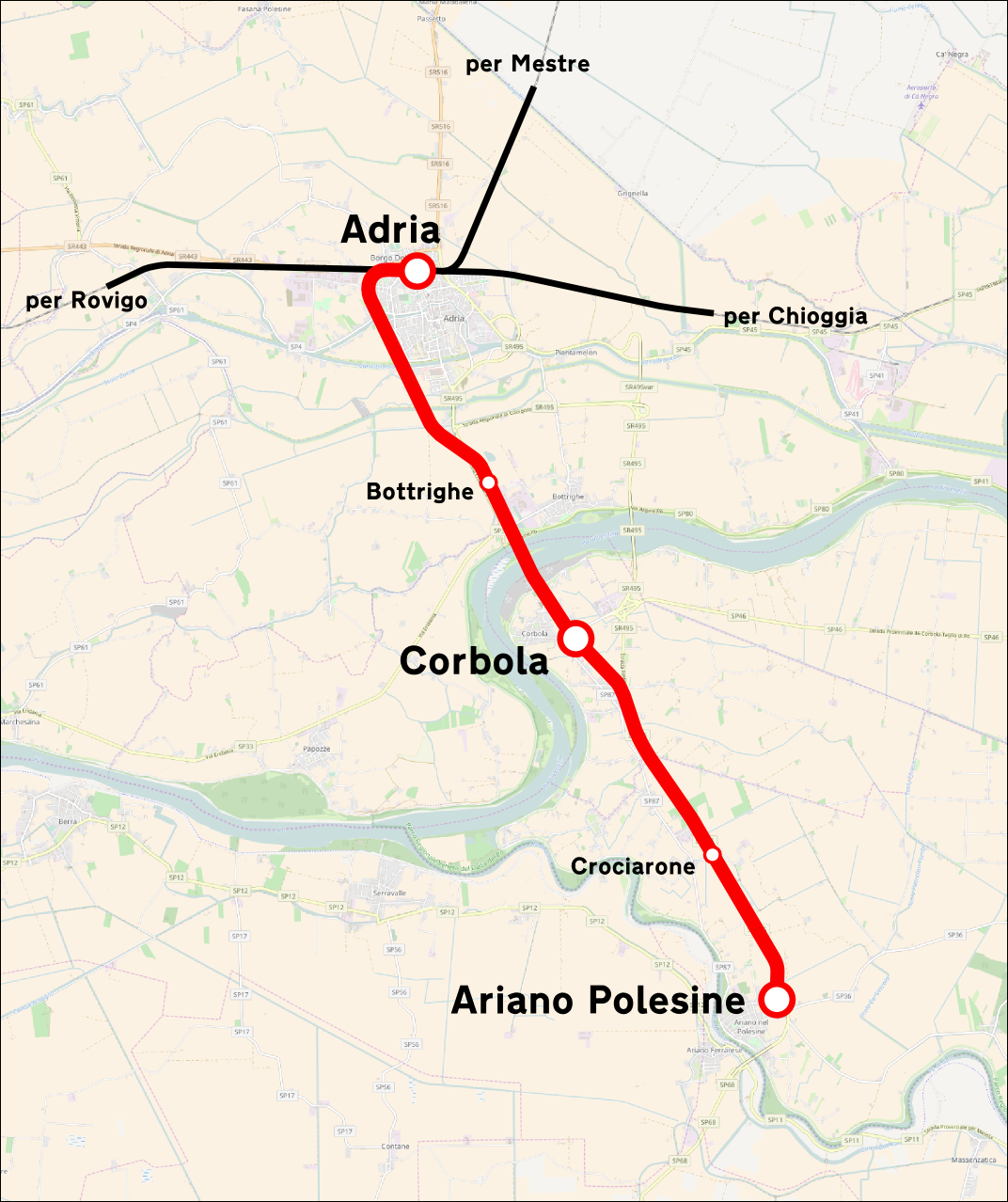
Adria-Ariano Polesine railway

=== Narrow gauge railways ===
Line	Gauge	Start of SV operation	End of SV operation	Region	Notes
Torrebelvicino-Schio	950 mm	1906	1925	Veneto	Closed
Schio-Rocchette	950 mm	1906	1949	Veneto	Closed
Rocchette-Arsiero	950 mm	1906	1933	Veneto	Rebuilt to standard gauge
Rocchette-Asiago	950 mm	1910	1958	Veneto	Rack railway on Cogollo-Val Campiello section
Vicenza-Montagnana	950 mm	1887	1911	Veneto	Sold to Società Tranvie Vicentine and converted to standard gauge
Cividale-Susida	750 mm	1915	1921	Friuli-Venezia Giulia	Passed to Eredi Binetti
Tolmezzo-Moscardo	750 mm	1915	1919	Friuli-Venezia Giulia	Passed to Società Elettrica Paluzza and Consorzio tranvia del But
Villa Santina-Comeglians	750 mm	1916	1920	Friuli-Venezia Giulia	Passed to the Val Degano consortium

=== Tramways ===
Line	Gauge	Electrical system	Start of SV Operation	End of SV operation	Region	Notes
Portonaccio-Ciampino-Marino	1445 mm	none	1884	1889	Lazio	Replaced by the Rome-Albano railway
Padova-Malcontenta Fusina	1445 mm	6000 V AC, 25 Hz	1885	1954	Veneto	Steam until 1909, then electrified. Closed 1954
Bologna-Imola	1445 mm	none	1885	1935	Emilia-Romagna	Closed
Padova-Bagnoli di Sopra	1445 mm	6000 V AC, 25 Hz	1886	1954	Veneto	Steam until 1928, then electrified. Closed 1954
Padova-Piove di Sacco	1445 mm	6000 V AC, 25 Hz	1890	1954	Veneto	Steam until 1913, then electrified. Closed 1954
Udine-San Daniele	1000 mm	none	1905	1924	Friuli-Venezia Giulia	Passed to engineer Giacomo Cantoni
Montebelluna-Valdobbiadene	1000 mm	975 V DC	1913	1931	Veneto	Closed
Susegana-Pieve di Soligo	1000 mm	none	1913	1925	Veneto	1925: Taken over by the state. 1931: Closed
Montebelluna-Asolo	1000 mm	975 V DC	1913-14	1931	Veneto	Closed

Track gauge
For more on the 1445 mm gauge see: Track gauge in Italy.

Maps

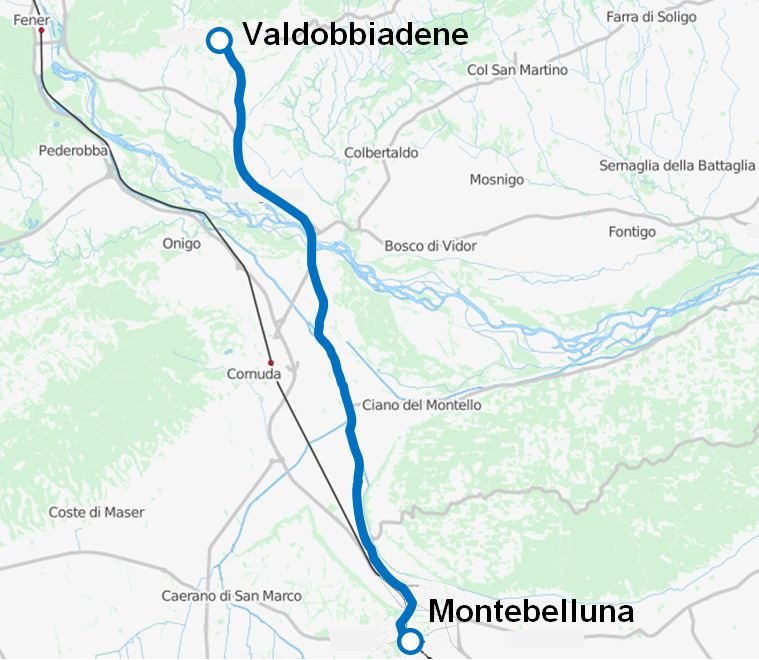
Montebelluna-Valdobbiadene tramway

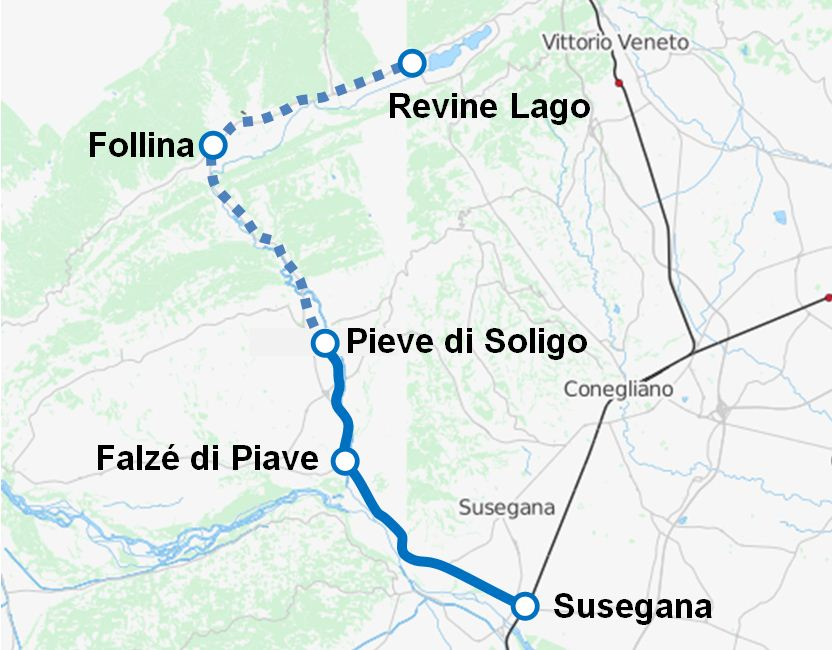
Susegana-Pieve di Soligo tramway

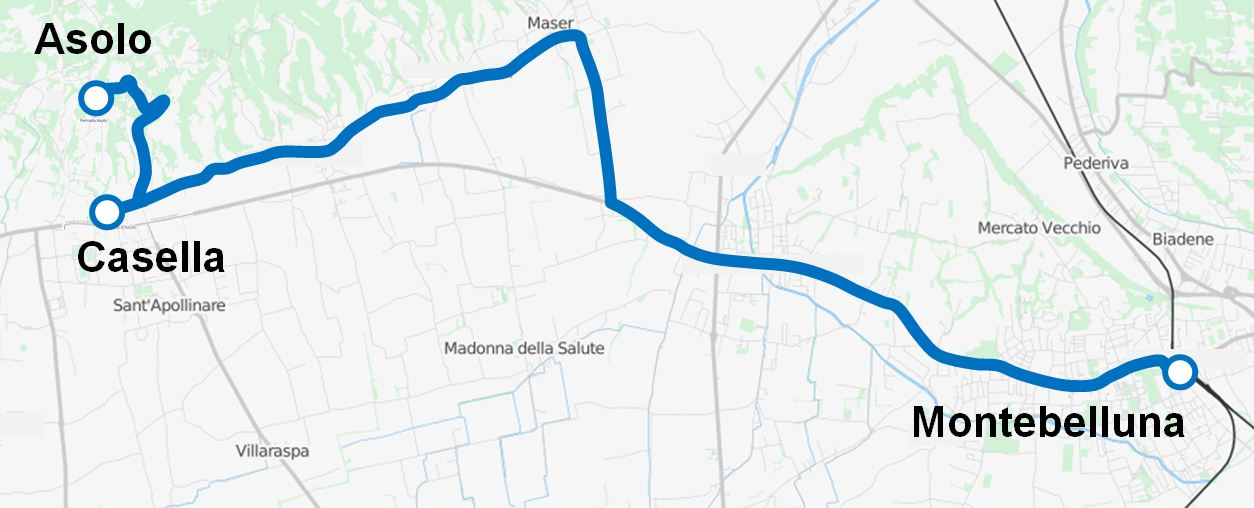
Montebelluna-Asolo tramway

== Rolling stock ==
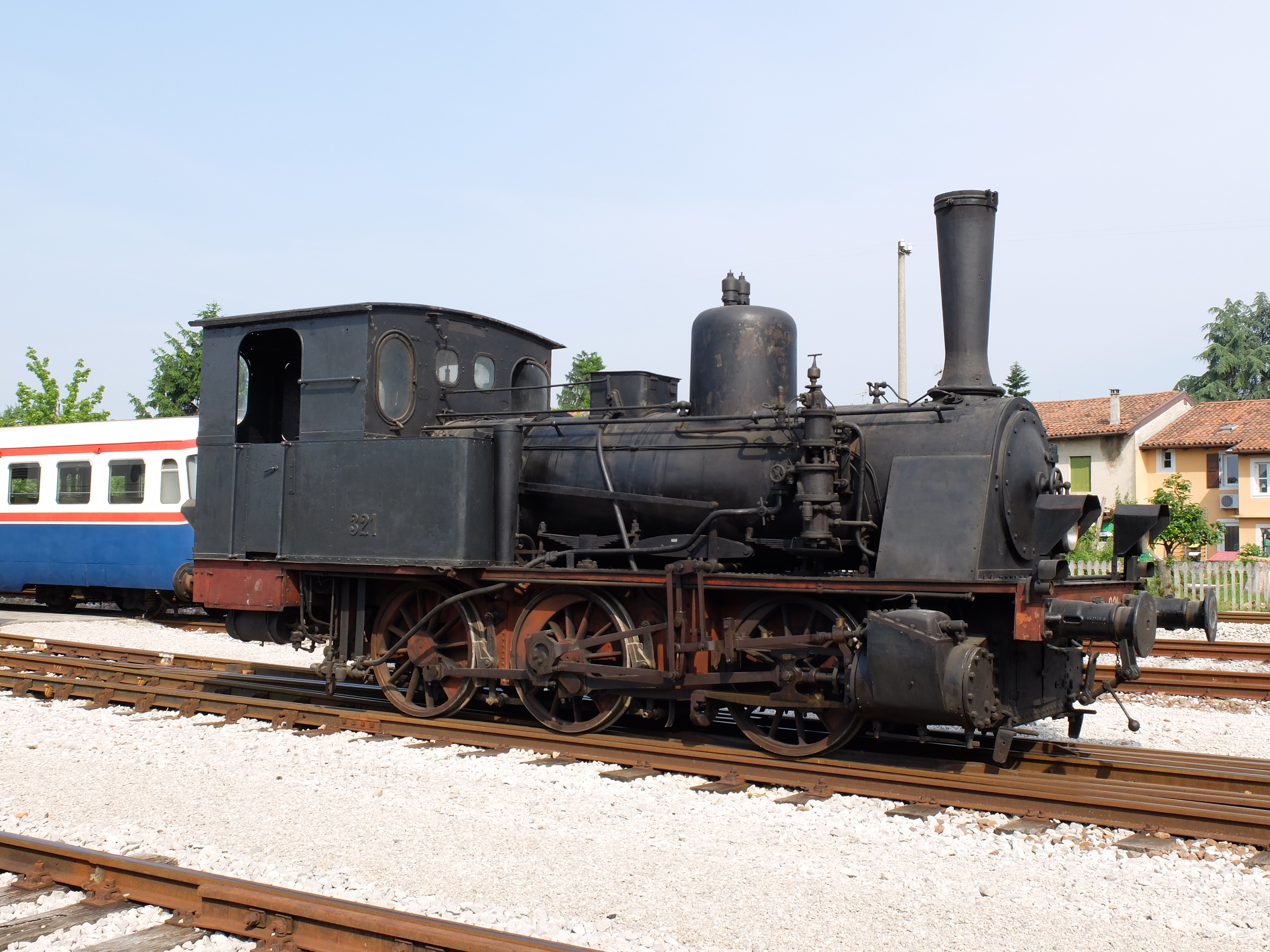
Societa Veneta T3 type no. 321 (formerly 102) at Udine in 2016

In 1915, locomotives were re-numbered in the following groups:

- 1–139, for narrow-gauge locomotives
- 140–199, for standard gauge tramway locomotives
- 200–299, for four-coupled locomotives, e.g. 0-4-0
- 300–399, for six-coupled locomotives, e.g. 0-6-0
- 400–499, for eight-coupled locomotives, e.g. 0-8-0

== See also ==
- Sistemi Territoriali

== Bibliography ==
- Giovanni Cornolò, La Società Veneta Ferrovie, 2nd edition, Ponte San Nicolo, Duegi editrice, 2005. ISBN 88-900979-6-5.
