= Tarzo =

- Comune
- Comune di Tarzo
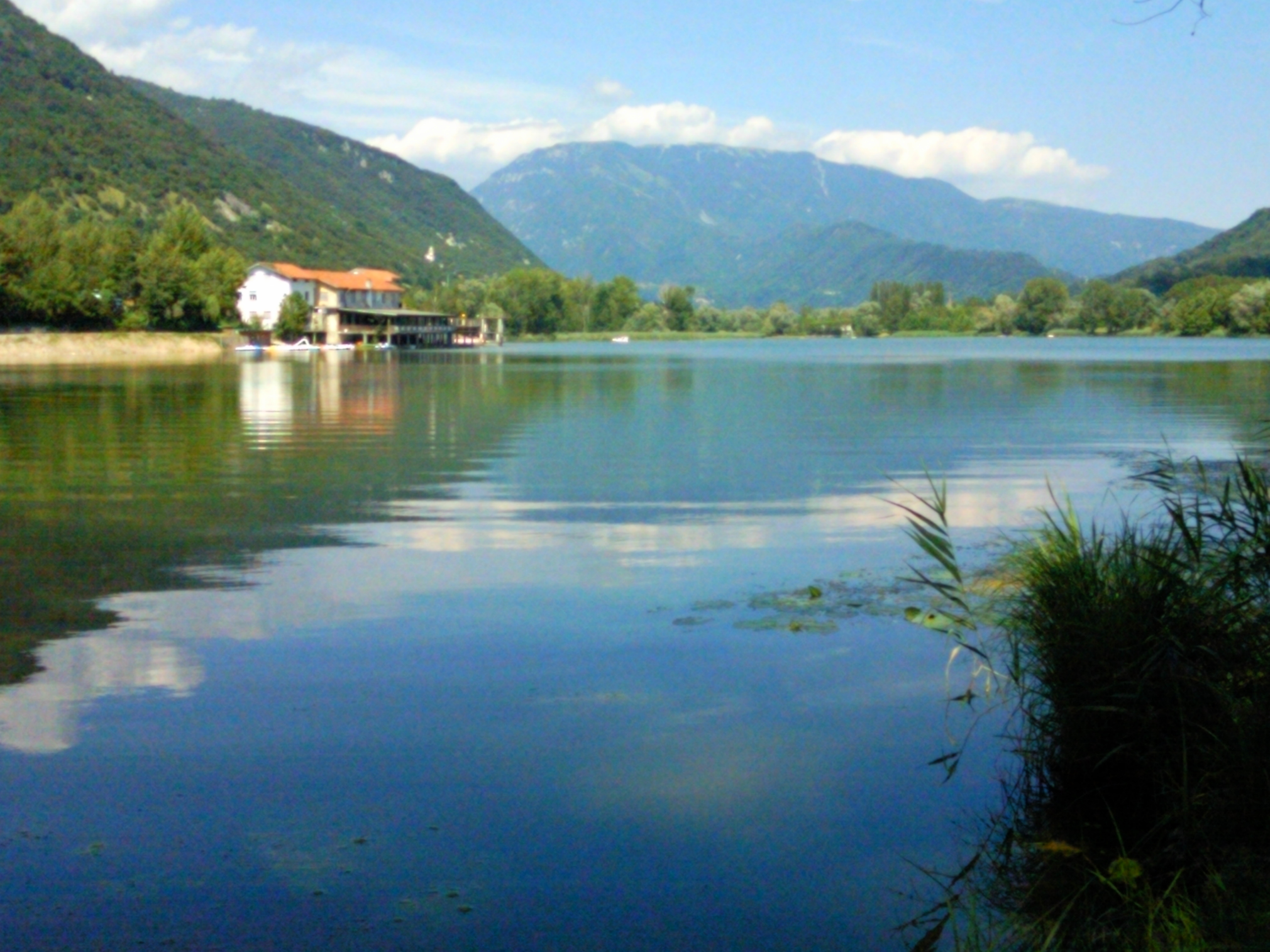

- Location within Italy Location within Veneto
- Coordinates: 45°58′N 12°14′E
- Country: Italy
- Region: Veneto
- Province: Province of Treviso (TV)
- Frazioni: Arfanta, Colmaggiore, Corbanese, Fratta, Nogarolo, Resera

Area
  - Total: 23.8 km^{2} (9.2 sq mi)
- Elevation: 267 m (876 ft)

Population (Dec. 2024)
  - Total: 4,160
  - Density: 175/km^{2} (453/sq mi)
- Demonym: Tarzesi
- Time zone: UTC+1 (CET)
  - Summer (DST): UTC+2 (CEST)
- Postal code: 31020
- Dialing code: 0438
- Website: Official website

Tarzo is a comune (municipality) in the Province of Treviso in the Italian region Veneto, located about 60 kilometres (37 miles) north of Venice and about 35 km (22 mi) north of Treviso. As of 31 December 2023, it had a population of 4,160 and an area of 23.8 square kilometres (9.2 sq mi).

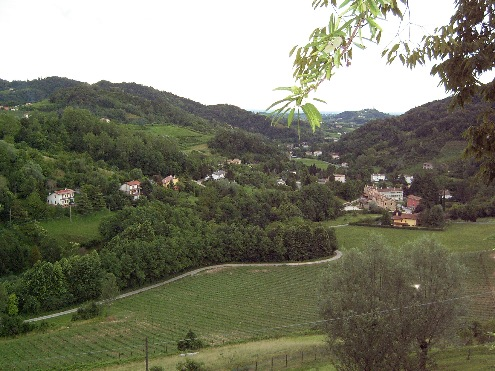
Colline nei dintorni di Tarzo

The municipality of Tarzo is divided into seven hamlets: Arfanta, Colmaggiore, Corbanese, Fratta, Nogarolo, Resera and Tarzo itself; other inhabited areas include Costa di Là, Reseretta.

Tarzo borders the following municipalities: Cison di Valmarino, Refrontolo, Revine Lago, San Pietro di Feletto, Vittorio Veneto.

== Physical geography ==
Among the few flat areas, we remember the one at the bottom of the Treviso Valley (it extends south of the lakes of Revine Lago, on whose shores Colmaggiore and Fratta stand) and the southern part of Corbanese (where the industrial area is located). The area is partially hilly, characterized by wooded valleys and numerous torrential streams.

== Demographic evolution ==
Historical population

Year	Pop.	±%
1861	?	—
1871	3,816	—
1881	3,758	−1.5%
1901	3,871	+3.0%
1911	4,658	+20.3%
1921	5,159	+10.8%

Year	Pop.	±%
1931	5,102	−1.1%
1936	4,798	−6.0%
1951	4,768	−0.6%
1961	4,253	−10.8%
1971	4,276	+0.5%
1981	4,321	+1.1%

Year	Pop.	±%
1991	4,382	+1.4%
2001	4,537	+3.5%
2011	4,583	+1.0%
2021	4,226	−7.8%

Source: Data from ISTAT

=== Foreign ethnicities and minorities ===
As of December 31, 2023 foreigners residents in the municipality were 240, i.e. 5.8% of the population. The largest foreign community is that from Romania with 16.3% of all foreigners present in the municipality, followed by Morocco and Senegal.

== Artwork ==
Made from the wood of felled trees, the Winged Lion of Martalar is a symbol of rebirth and identity.

== Events ==
- February: Candlemas Festival
- July–August: Emigrant Festival "I Cortili dell'Arte" (The Courtyards of Art) is an event organized by the Tarzo Pro Loco, now in its 14th edition, which brings together painters, sculptors, photographers, ceramists, and cartoonists, and enlivens the village of Fratta for three days every summer.
- August: Cor – Spazi Pubblici Palpitanti (Pulpitating Public Spaces) is a social and cultural redevelopment project, a cultural event that celebrates contemporary art in a revitalized historical setting. The project is funded by the "Bando Borghi" (Borghi Call) with NextgenerationEU – PNRR funds, presented by the Municipality of Tarzo. The third edition of the event confirms and strengthens its role as an essential event for the regeneration of public spaces and the promotion of contemporary art.
- August 24: St. Bartholomew's Day in Arfanta
- First week of September: September Festival in Corbanese
- Last Sunday of September: The Spirit of Ancient Flavors
- October: Chestnut Festival
