= Susegana Bridge =

- Coordinates: 45°51′28″N 12°11′8″E
- Carries: Via Claudia Augusta
- Crosses: Stream without name
- Locale: Susegana, Veneto, Italy

Characteristics
- Design: Segmental arch bridge
- Width: 5.3 m
- Longest span: 3 m
- No. of spans: 1

Location
- Interactive map of Susegana Bridge

The Susegana Bridge (in Italian: Ponte romano di Susegana) is one of a series of Roman bridges on the Via Claudia Augusta in Susegana, northern Italy. The small structure is notable for its flattened arch, which classifies it as a Roman segmental arch bridge.

Being the fifth of altogether six ancient footbridges in the frazione Colfosco, it crosses a stream without a name downstream of the provincial road bridge, shortly before the road reaches the intersection to Falzé di Piave.

The bridge is 5.3 m wide; its single arch, built of eleven irregular wedge-shaped stones, has a clear span of 3 m and a very low rise compared to the standard semi-circular bridge arch of antiquity. Its construction is dated to the first half of the 1st century AD.

Such material-saving flat arches occur in ancient bridges of the Veneto region quite frequently, leading to suggestions of a local building school. One reason for this concentration may have been the particular topography of the coastal region, whose soft alluvial soils would not have been suitable for the massive semi-circular arches and piers characteristic of Roman bridge building. Moreover, the approaches of segmental arch bridges, with their lower crest, provided less of an obstacle to foot traffic and pack animals, an obvious advantage in the flat Venetian landscape.

The structure was reportedly still in good condition in 1938, but has since deteriorated, with one of its spandrel walls having collapsed.

== See also ==
- List of Roman bridges
- Roman architecture
- Roman engineering

== Sources ==
- Galliazzo, Vittorio (1995), I ponti romani, vol. 1, Treviso: Edizioni Canova, p. 432, ISBN 88-85066-66-6
- Galliazzo, Vittorio (1994), I ponti romani. Catalogo generale, vol. 2, Treviso: Edizioni Canova, p. 215 (No. 443), ISBN 88-85066-66-6
- Quilici, Lorenzo (2008), "Land Transport, Part 1: Roads and Bridges", in Oleson, John Peter (ed.), The Oxford Handbook of Engineering and Technology in the Classical World, New York: Oxford University Press, pp. 551–579, ISBN 978-0-19-518731-1
