= Domenico Rupolo =

Italian architect

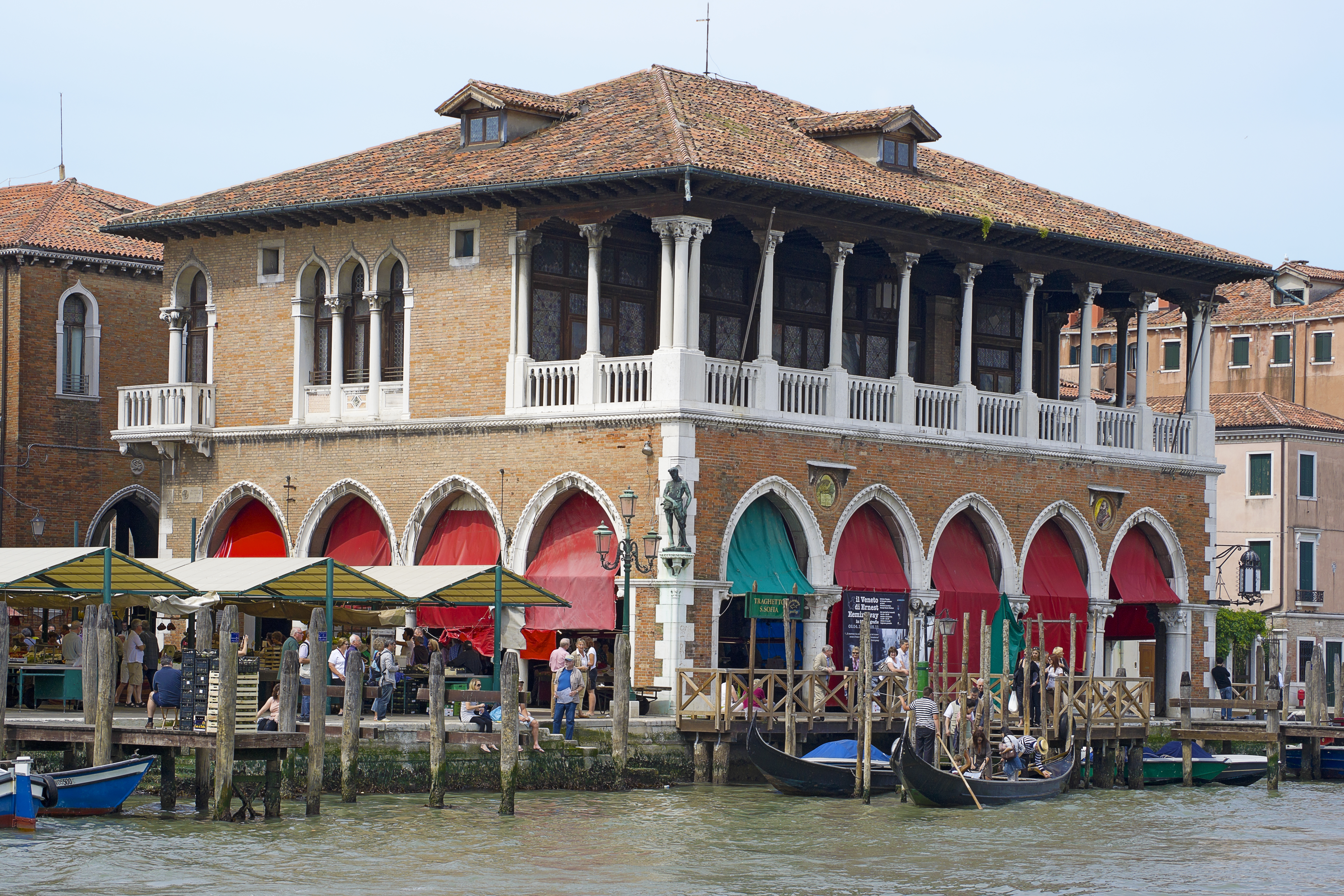
The Pescheria di Venezia, designed by Rupolo and the painter Cesare Laurenti.

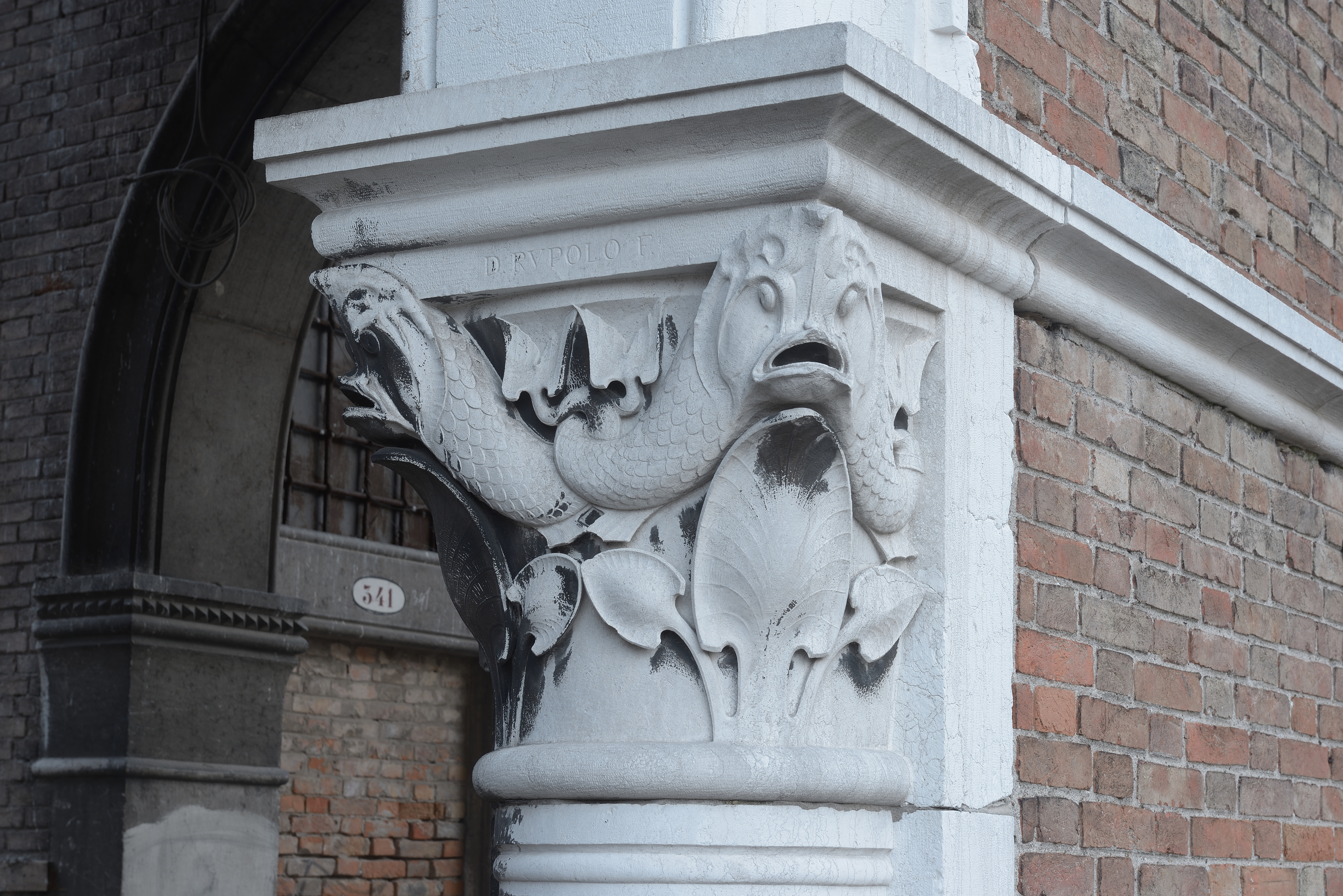
A capital on the Pescheria di Venezia, signed 'D. Rupolo F.'

Domenico Rupolo (1861, Caneva – 1945, Caneva) was an Italian architect. He was mainly active in Veneto and Friuli-Venezia Giulia and in the neo-Gothic, Byzantine Revival and Romanesque Revival styles.

He designed several private commissions on the Lido, such as the villa Romanelli (1906) and the villa dei Padri Armeni (1907), in the Romanesque-Byzantine style. He also designed several churches, such as the parish churches in Sernaglia della Battaglia, Fossalta di Portogruaro, Trebaseleghe, Mansuè, Noventa di Piave, Basalghelle, Pieve di Soligo and Visnadello. He also designed in the decorative interior of the church of S. Lucia di Piave in Treviso province, where he met and encouraged the artistic development of the young Riccardo Granzotto, who became a major artist and sculpture professor in the Venice Academy. In 1924 he also designed the 1924 triumphal arch commemorating the dead of World War One at Venegazzù, again in Treviso province.

== Gallery ==
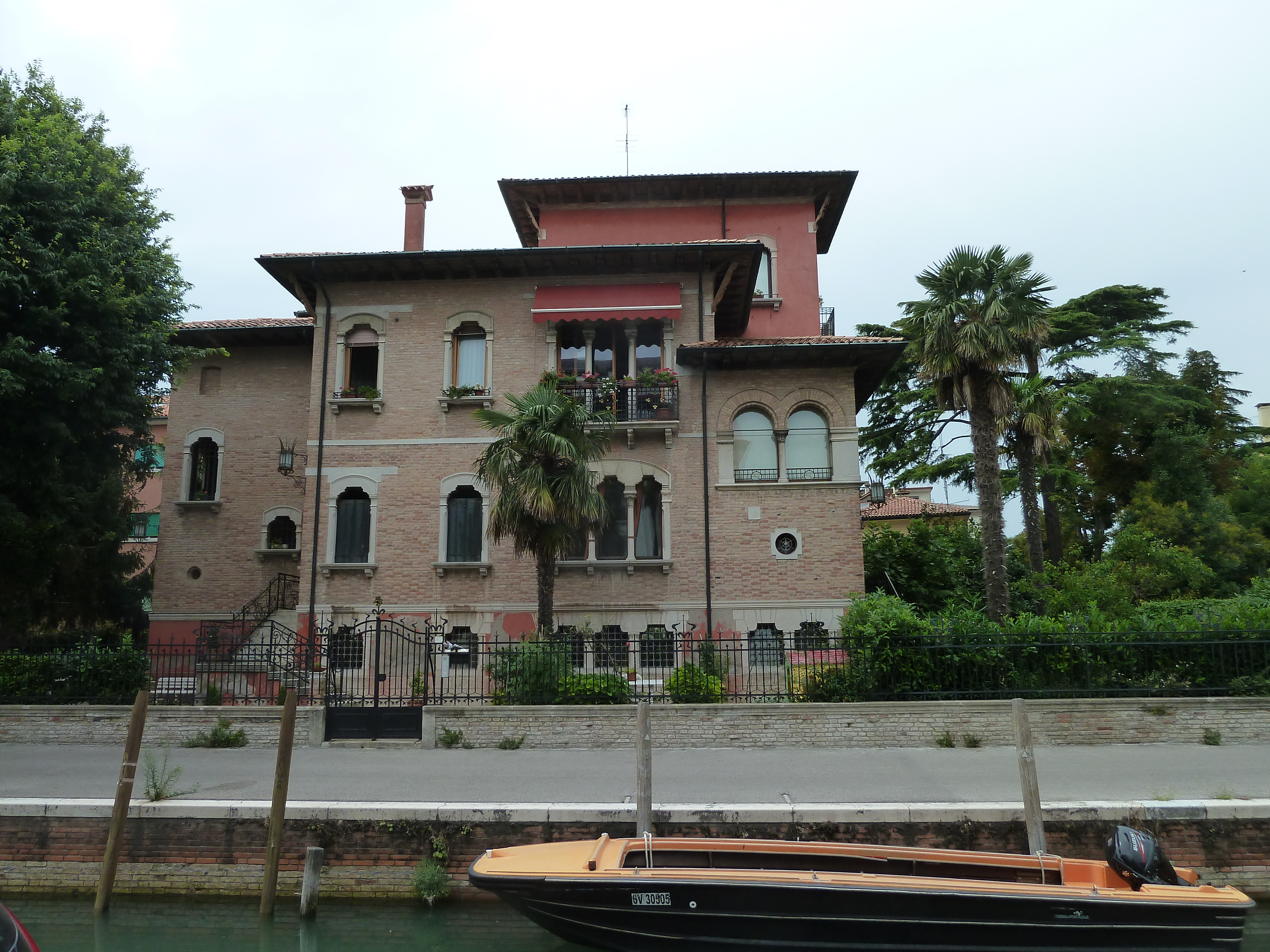
Villa dei Padri Armeni (1906)

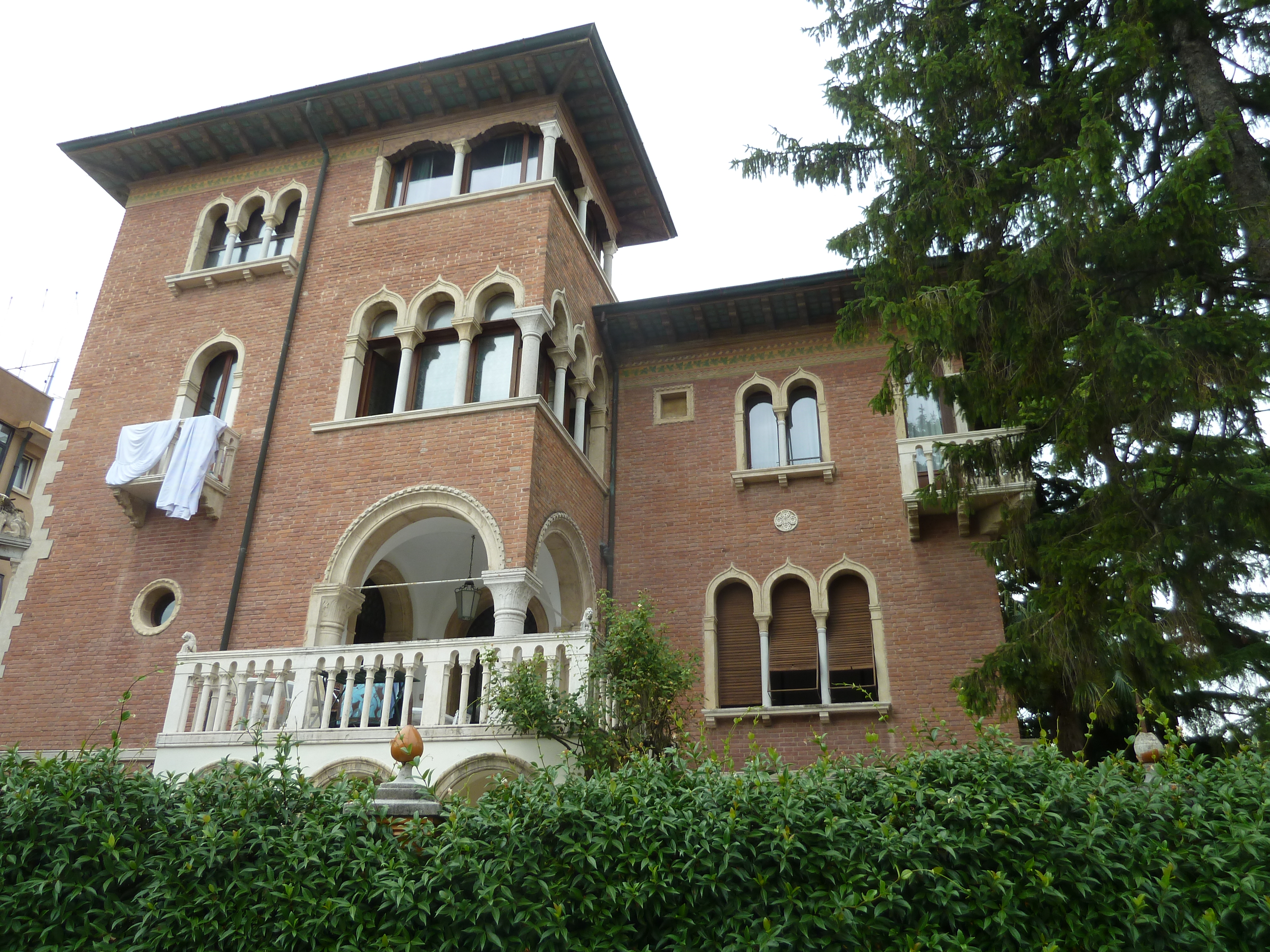
Villa Romanelli (1906)

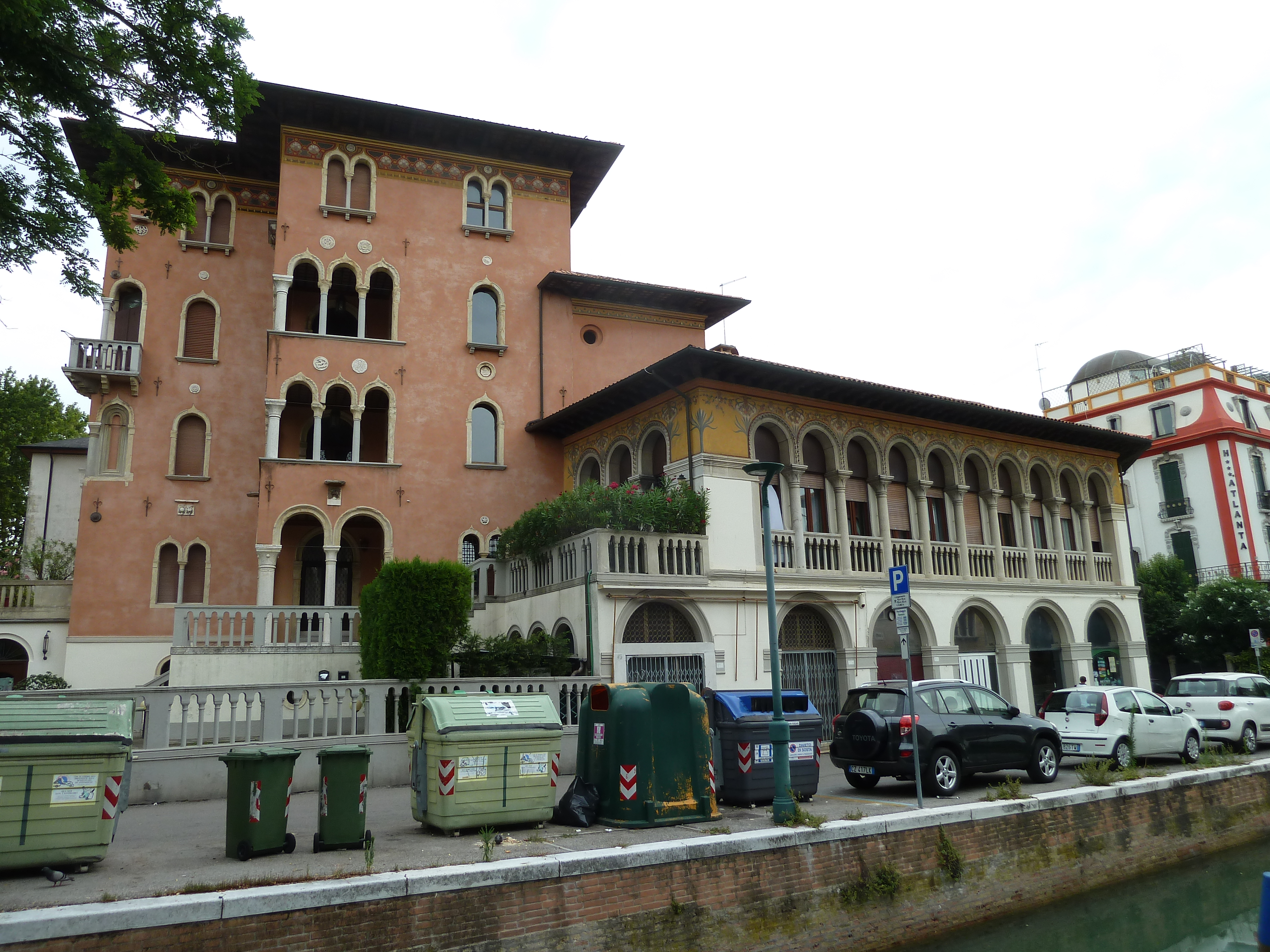
Villa Otello (1905)
