= Arsiero =

- Comune
- Comune di Arsiero
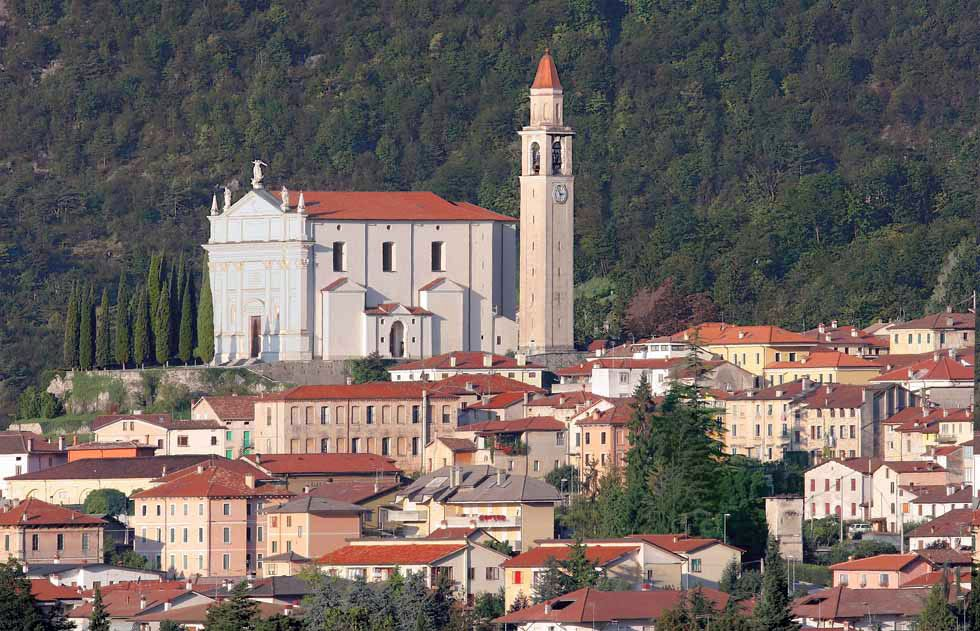

- Location within Italy Location within Veneto
- Coordinates: 45°48′N 11°21′E
- Country: Italy
- Region: Veneto
- Province: Vicenza (VI)
- Frazioni: Castana

Government
  - Mayor: Tiziana Occhino

Area
  - Total: 41.4 km^{2} (16.0 sq mi)
- Elevation: 356 m (1,168 ft)

Population (30 April 2017)
  - Total: 3,138
  - Density: 75.8/km^{2} (196/sq mi)
- Demonym: Arsieresi
- Time zone: UTC+1 (CET)
  - Summer (DST): UTC+2 (CEST)
- Postal code: 36011
- Dialing code: 0445
- Patron saint: St. Michael Archangel
- Saint day: 29 September
- Website: Official website

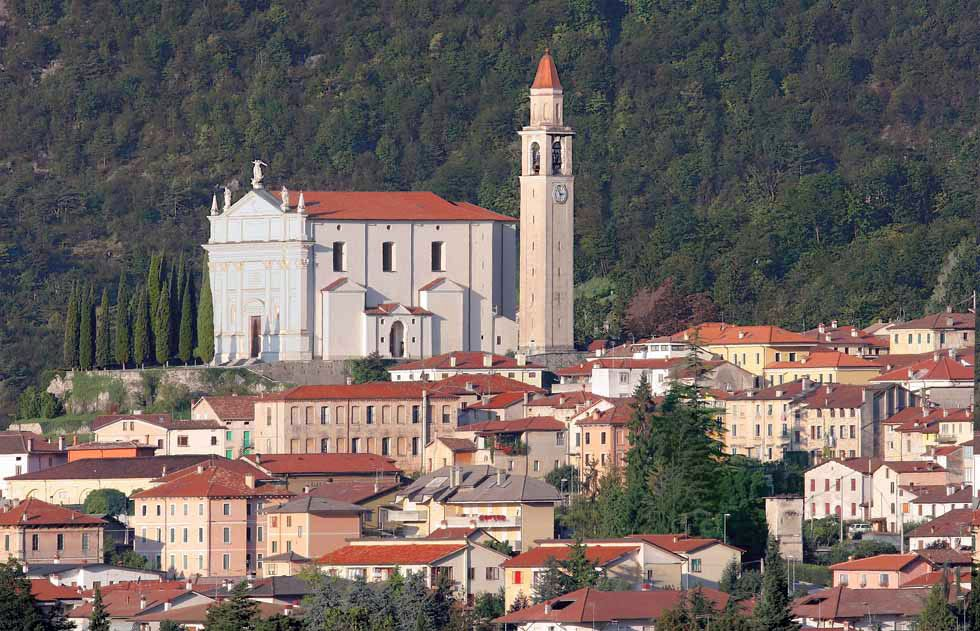
Parish Church

Arsiero is a town in the province of Vicenza, Veneto, Italy. It is west SP82 provincial road.

== Sources ==
- (Google Maps)
