= Castello San Salvatore =

Castle in Susegana, Italy

- Susegana, Veneto, Italy
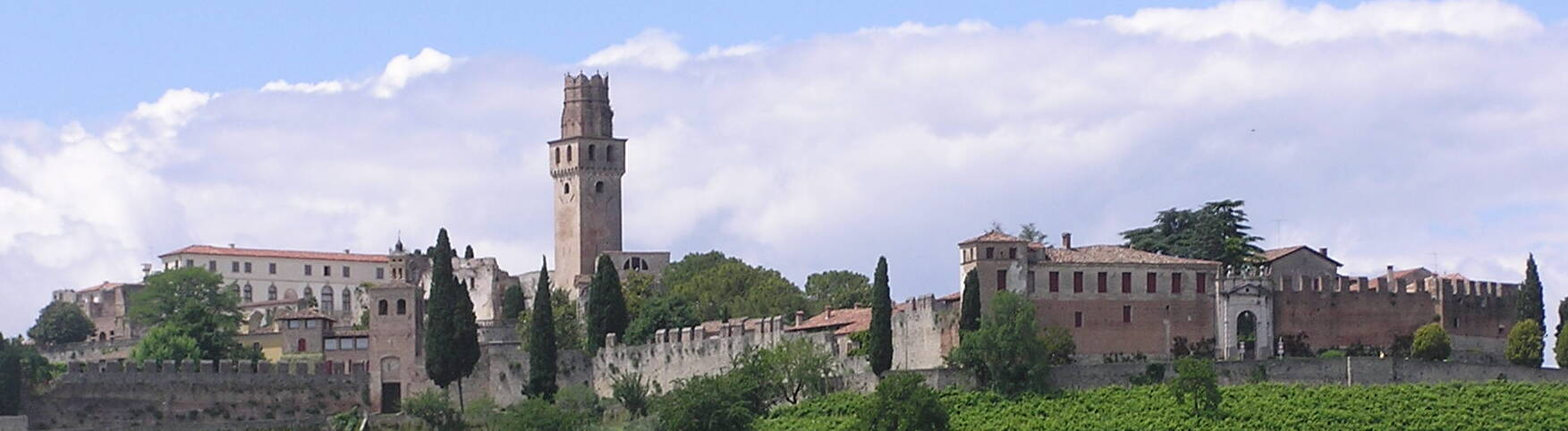
- View of the Castello di San Salvatore

Site information
- Type: Castle
- Owner: Private
- Open to the public: Yes
- Condition: Intact
- Website: www.castellosansalvatore.it

Location
- Coordinates: 45°51′4″N 12°14′3″E
- Area: 3,000 m^{2} (32,000 sq ft)

Site history
- Built: 13th–14th centuries

The Castello San Salvatore is a castle in Susegana, in the Province of Treviso, Veneto, Italy. It was built in the 13th and 14th centuries, and is one of the largest castles in northern Italy.

== History ==
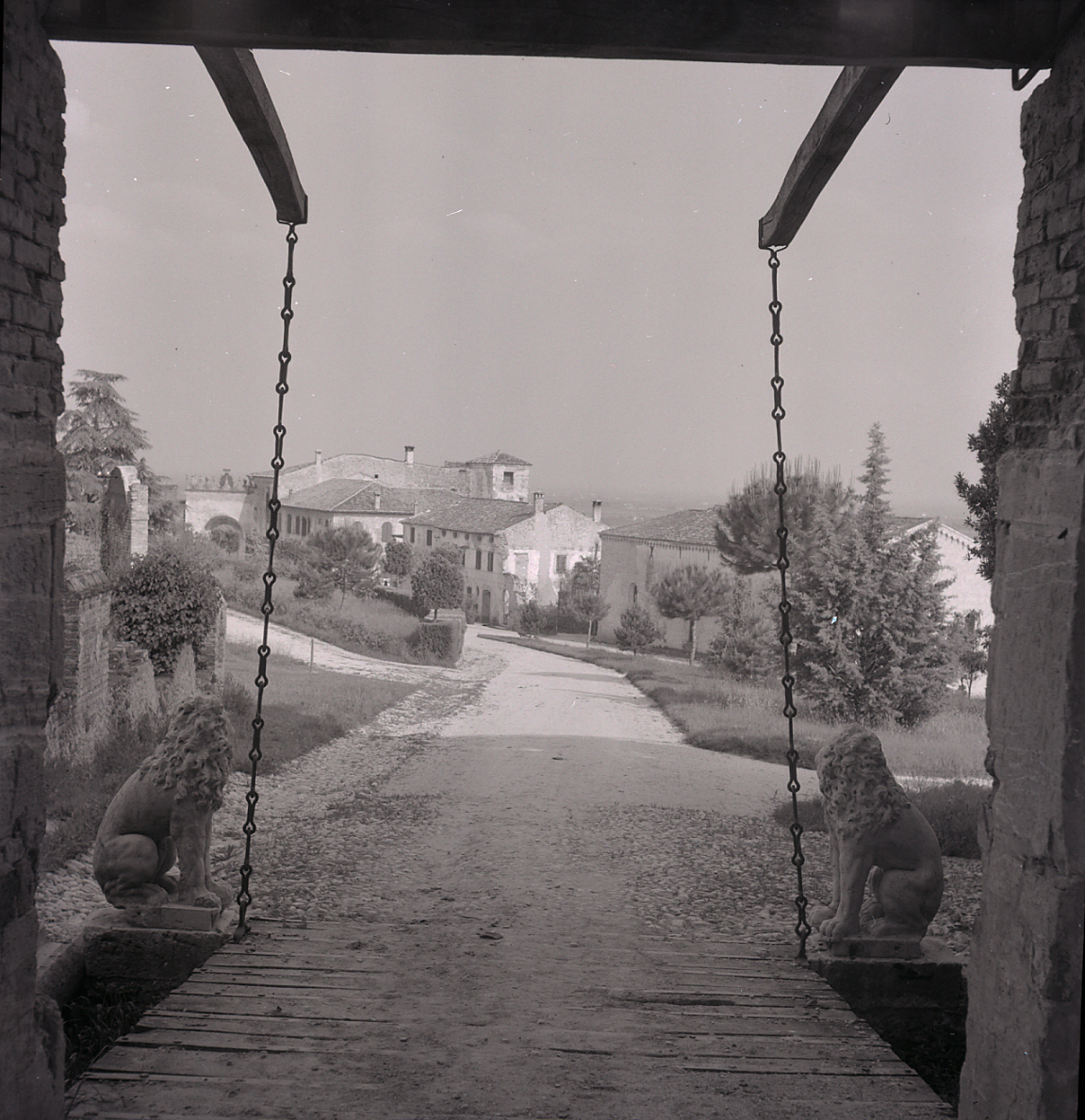
Drawbridge, seen from the inside. Photo by Paolo Monti

In 1245, the city of Treviso granted the hill of San Salvatore to the Collalto family. They built a castle on top of the hill between the late 13th and early 14th centuries. In 1312, when the castle was complete, Emperor Henry VII granted full jurisdiction of the area to the Collalto family. They planted vineyards in the fields around the castle.

From the 16th to 18th centuries, it was a peaceful period in the area, and the castle was embellished by a number of artists. Its chapel was decorated with frescoes, and a palace called Palazzo Odoardo was built inside the castle.

Following the Battle of Caporetto in 1917, Susegana fell under Austro-German occupation. The castle was used by the occupation forces, and was later bombarded by Italian artillery, severely damaging the structure in the process. The castle was restored between 1943 and 1951.

The castle is now used as a venue for cultural events. A scene of the first season of the Netflix series I Hate Christmas was shot in the castle.
