= Falzè di Piave =

Coordinates: 45.861°N 12.173°E

Falzè di Piave is a frazione of the municipality of Sernaglia della Battaglia in the Province of Treviso. It is located in the south-east corner of the Piave quarter between the Piave river and its tributary the Soligo.

Amongst the local sites of interest are the Church of Saint Martin Bishop (Chiesa dei San Martino Tours), the Monument of the Three Arditi and the Caduti (Monumento agli Arditi e ai Caduti), Chapel-monument of Saint Lucy the Martyr (Capitello di Santa Lucia), and Grotto of the Great War (Grotte della Grande Guerra). The latter commemorates the Battle of Piave.

There is an annual festival in the frazione, called Falzettissima, held each year in August.

A new elementary school for the frazione, named in honor of O. De Gaspari, was built in 2023.
