= Collalto family =

Austro-Italian noble house

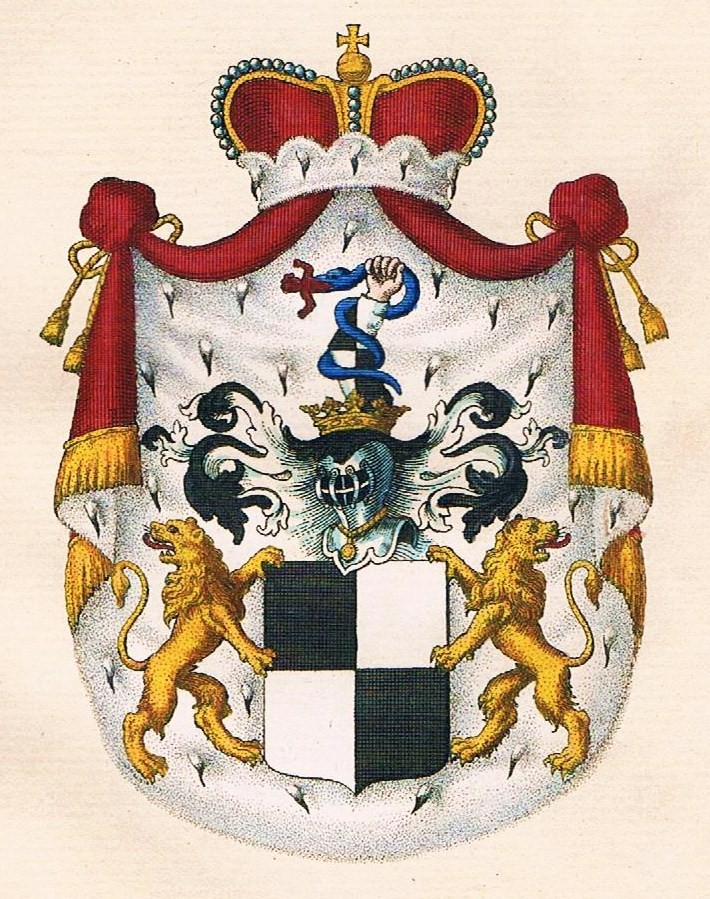
Coat of arms of the House of Collalto

The House of Collalto (full name - Princes of Collalto and San Salvatore) is an old and distinguished Austro-Italian noble house of Lombard origin, named after their seat at Collalto in Susegana, now in the Province of Treviso in Italy. Throughout its history, the house had their possessions in Italy, Austria and Moravia. Its name comes from Italian (colle alto - high hill).

== History ==
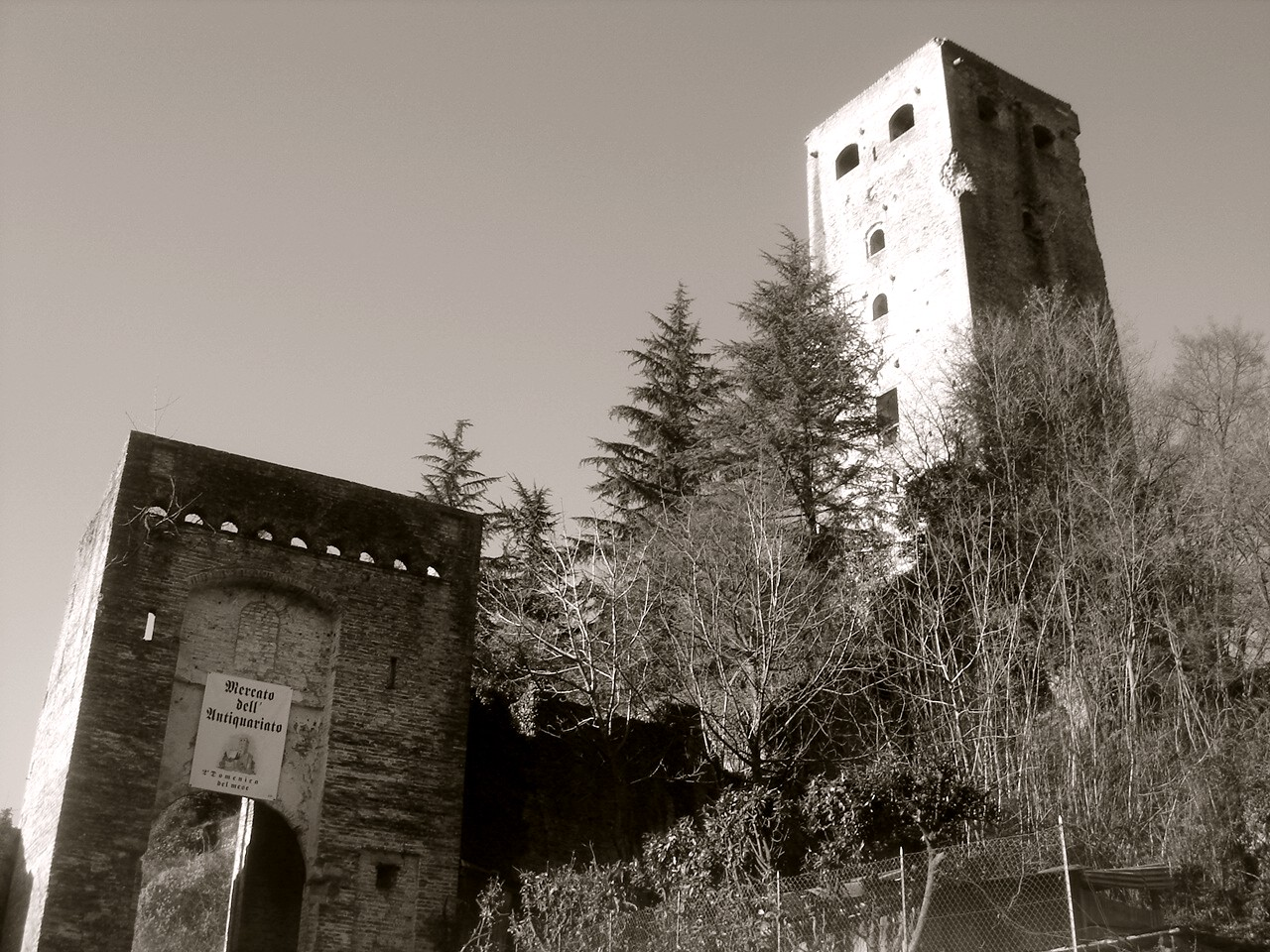
The castle at Collalto

There is no definite evidence on the house's origins, but tradition holds that they were initially Lombards. The first documents about the house come from 958. In 1110, the castle Collalto in the hills near the Piave river was built. Later in the 13th century, Rambaldo VIII. had the castle San Salvatore built. The founder of the Austrian family branch was Marco Carlo Collalto, an ambassador of the Holy Roman Emperor Charles IV: at the court of Innocent IV. The family was raised to the rank of Imperial Count in 1610 by Emperor Ferdinand II, who sold the Moravian possessions with the centre in Brtnice (Pirnitz) to Rambaldo XIII. On 22 November 1822, they were raised to the rank of Prince in Austria. The family belonged to the list of 16 Princely Houses that were not mediatized.

The Italian possessions consisted of the castles Collalto and San Salvatore. The Moravian possessions gained by Rambald XIII were in the extent of 10,827 ha. The house owned them till 1945, when they were confiscated by Czechoslovak state.

== The family today ==
Nowadays, Prince Collalto is a wine producer in Susegana near Treviso and the interim head of the family is Princess Isabella of Croÿ, firstborn child of Prince Manfredo von Collalto und San Salvatore (1932-2004) and his wife, Maria de la Trinidad Castillo y Moreno (b. 1937), daughter of Joaquin Castillo y Caballero, Marquis de Castro de Torres.

== Members ==
- Ramboldo, Count of Collalto, Holy Roman field marshal during the Thirty Years' War.
