= Soligo (surname) =

Soligo is a surname. Notable people with the surname include:

- Alga Soligo Malfatti (1951–1984), Italian naval officer
- Danilo Soligo (1920–2016), Italian painter
- Edda Soligo (1905–1984), Italian actress
- Evans Soligo (born 1979), Italian footballer
- Frederic Soligó i Amela (1904–1980), Valencian soccer player
- Jake Soligo (born 2003), Australian rules footballer
- Josep Soligó (1910–1994), Spanish painter
- Melissa Soligo (born 1969), Canadian curler
