= Sernaglia della Battaglia =

- Comune
- Comune di Sernaglia della Battaglia
- Coat of arms

- Location within Italy Location within Veneto
- Coordinates: 45°52′30″N 12°8′00″E
- Country: Italy
- Region: Veneto
- Province: Treviso (TV)
- Frazioni: Falzé di Piave, Fontigo, Villanova

Government
  - Mayor: Mirco Villanova dal 27-5-2019 ((Lega Nord - lista civica))

Area
  - Total: 20.2 km^{2} (7.8 sq mi)
- Elevation: 119 m (390 ft)

Population (30 June 2023)
  - Total: 6,066
  - Density: 300/km^{2} (778/sq mi)
- Demonym: Sernagliesi
- Time zone: UTC+1 (CET)
  - Summer (DST): UTC+2 (CEST)
- Postal code: 31020
- Dialing code: 0438
- Website: Official website

Sernaglia della Battaglia is a comune (municipality) in the Province of Treviso in the Italian region Veneto, located about 50 kilometres (31 miles) northwest of Venice and about 25 kilometres (16 miles) northwest of Treviso.

Sernaglia della Battaglia borders the following municipalities: Farra di Soligo, Giavera del Montello, Moriago della Battaglia, Nervesa della Battaglia, Pieve di Soligo, Susegana, Volpago del Montello.

== History ==
The origins of the municipality are ancient: in the hamlet of Falzé, an ancient port on the Piave and a centre of commercial interests, finds dating back to the Eneolithic and Paleovenetian periods have been found and there are traces of the Roman presence in the rest of the territory.

With the decline of the Serenissima Republic of Venice, under whose lordship it remained until 1797, it followed, like the whole Veneto, to the French occupation, then by the Austrian one and the annexation to the Kingdom of Italy in 1866.

The sad living conditions of the population, aggravated by the two world wars, led to a massive exodus during the twentieth century, which gave those who remained the opportunity to receive remittances from fellow citizens abroad, essential for investing in businesses. Numerous private initiatives of small entrepreneurs were born that brought the country out of rural reality.

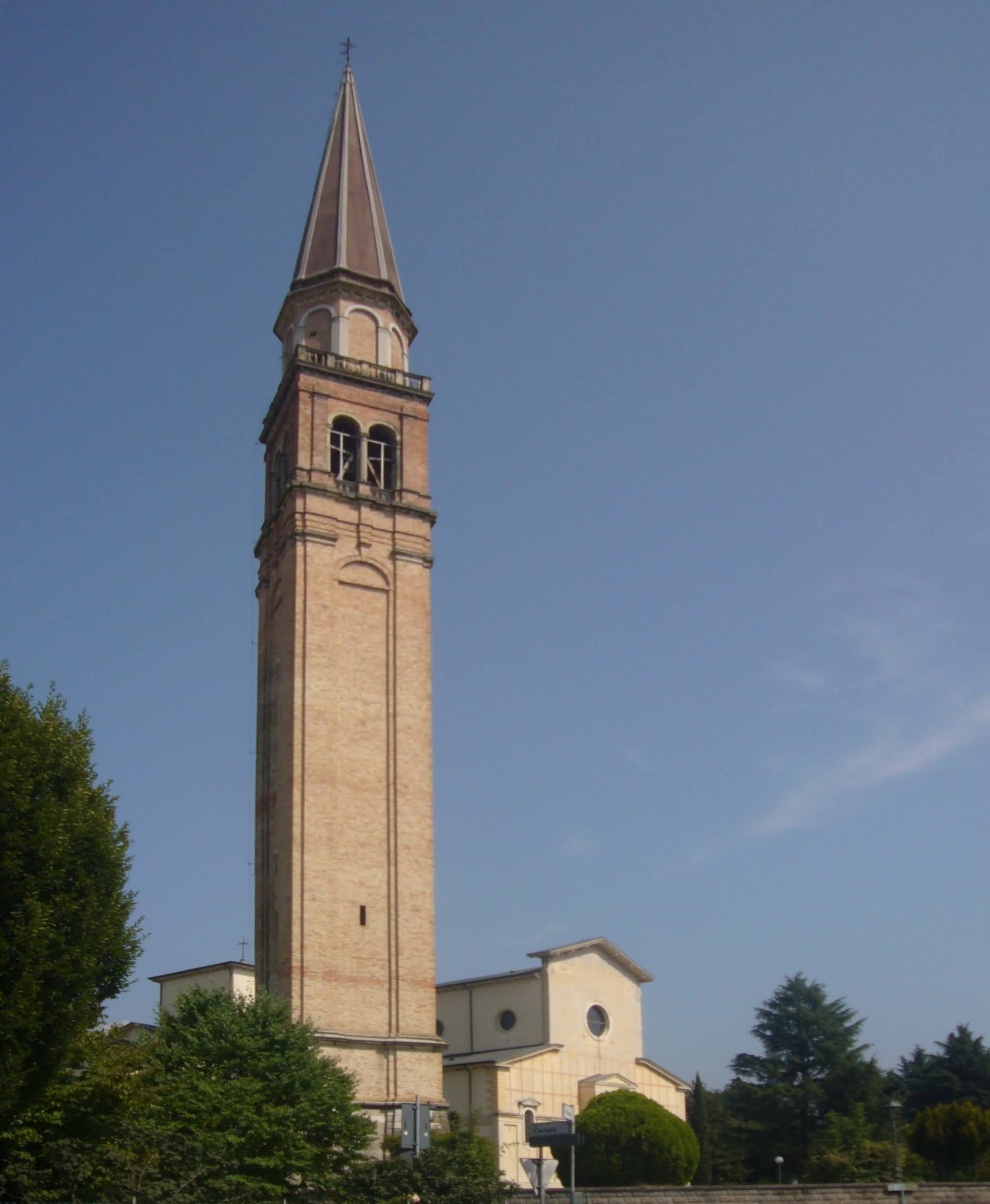
Church of Santa Maria Assunta

== Monuments and places of interest ==
- Church of Santa Maria Assunta, built in 1922 on the site of the previous parish church, which had been destroyed during the First World War.
- Parish Church of San Martino
- Parish Church of San Nicolò
- Church of San Rocco
- Monument to the Emigrant
- Monument Piazza San Rocco
- Oratory of Sant'Antonio Abate
- Monument to the Arditi of the I^ Assault Division
- The Castelik (Castrum de Sernalea)
- Partisans' Tombstone
- Column XXX^ Infantry - Sernaglia
- Grotta di Santa Barbara - Falzé
- The Palù of the Quartier del Piave
- Andrea Zanzotto Literary Park

== Culture ==
=== Cultural Institutions ===
Municipal library dedicated to Giocondo Pillonetto, inaugurated in 1992 by the writer Mario Rigoni Stern and the poet Andrea Zanzotto.

== Economy ==
The economy is based on agriculture and livestock. A number of small and medium-sized enterprises have given rise to the formation of industrial and craft areas, with the production of furniture taking precedence.

== Demographic evolution ==
Historical population

Year	Pop.	±%
1861	?	—
1871	2,452	—
1881	2,721	+11.0%
1901	3,073	+12.9%
1911	3,866	+25.8%
1921	4,123	+6.6%

Year	Pop.	±%
1931	4,585	+11.2%
1936	4,164	−9.2%
1951	4,663	+12.0%
1961	4,743	+1.7%
1971	5,201	+9.7%
1981	5,537	+6.5%

Year	Pop.	±%
1991	5,542	+0.1%
2001	5,799	+4.6%
2011	6,325	+9.1%
2021	6,086	−3.8%

Source: Data from ISTAT

=== Foreign ethnicities and minorities ===
As of December 31, 2022, foreigners residents in the municipality were 566, i.e. 9.4% of the population. The largest groups are shown below:

1. Morocco 167
2. North Macedonia 107
3. Romania 56
4. Bangladesh 27
5. China 25
6. Albania 22

== Infrastructure and transport ==
In 1913 the town became the site of a stop on the Susegana-Pieve di Soligo tramway, granted to the Società Veneta and formally suppressed in 1931. Severely damaged during the First World War, it was temporarily converted into a military railway and extended to Revine Lago.

Sernaglia della Battaglia is connected to the center of Montebelluna by the MOM bus line n.131 - Montebelluna, Cornuda FS, Pieve di Soligo.
