= Revine Lago =

- Comune
- Comune di Revine Lago
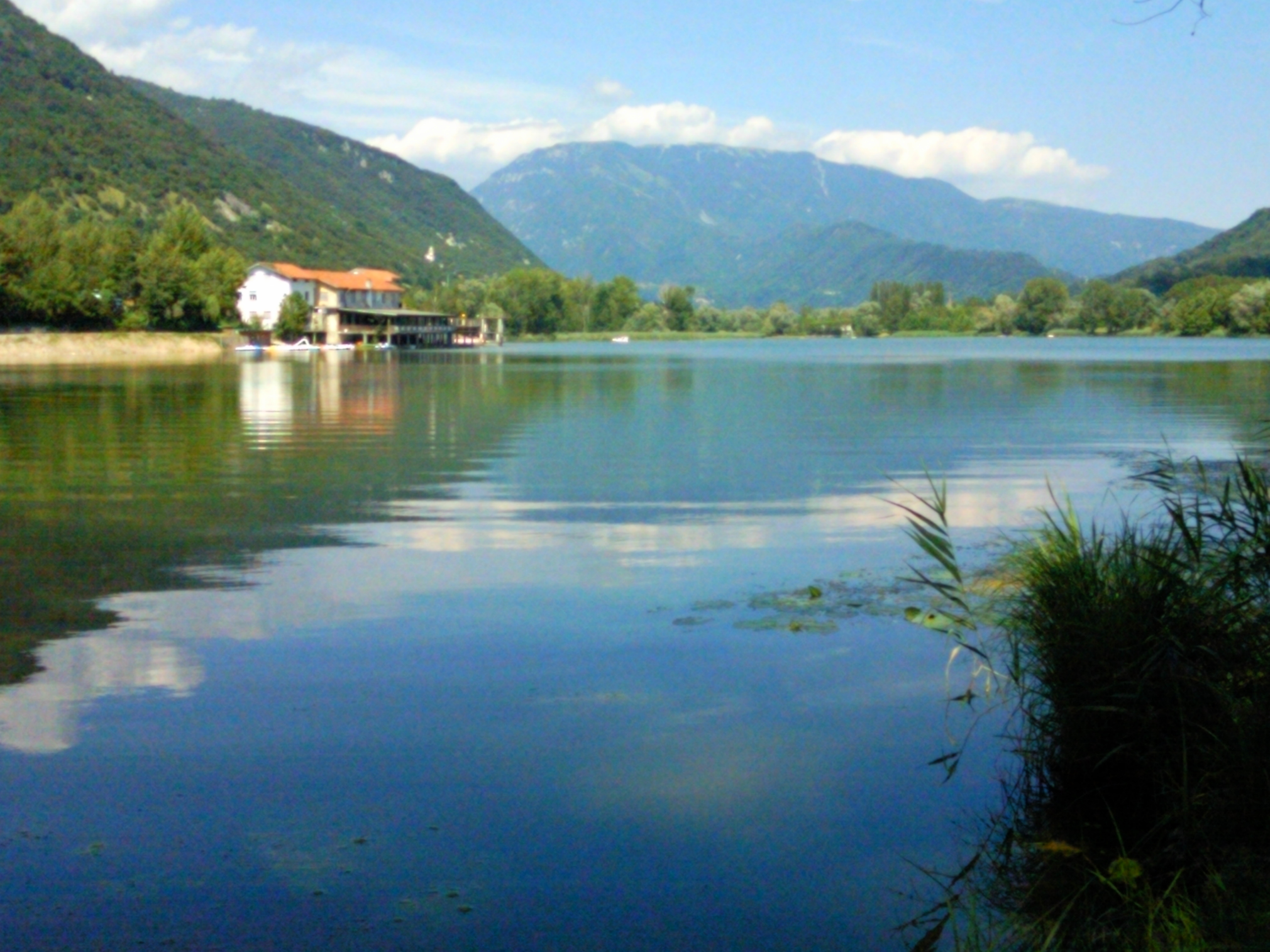

- Location within Italy Location within Veneto
- Coordinates: 46°0′N 12°16′E
- Country: Italy
- Region: Veneto
- Province: Province of Treviso (TV)
- Frazioni: Revine, Lago, Santa Maria (Sede Municipale)

Area
  - Total: 18.7 km^{2} (7.2 sq mi)
- Elevation: 225 m (738 ft)

Population (Dec. 2004)
  - Total: 2,190
  - Density: 117/km^{2} (303/sq mi)
- Demonym: Per la frazione di Revine: Revinot (dialettale)
- Time zone: UTC+1 (CET)
  - Summer (DST): UTC+2 (CEST)
- Postal code: 31020
- Dialing code: 0438
- Website: Official website

Revine Lago is a comune (municipality) in the Province of Treviso in the Italian region Veneto, located about 60 kilometres (37 miles) north of Venice and about 35 km (22 mi) north of Treviso. As of 31 December 2004, it had a population of 2,190 and an area of 18.7 square kilometres (7.2 sq mi). The municipality of Revine Lago contains the frazioni (subdivisions, mainly villages and hamlets) Revine, Lago, and Santa Maria (Sede Municipale). Revine Lago borders the following municipalities: Cison di Valmarino, Limana, Tarzo, Trichiana, Vittorio Veneto. The comune is also known for the Lakes of Revine Lago.

== Geography and climate ==
The municipality is dividend in two main areas: the Prealpi side and the valley. The Prealpi side is a slope almost completely covered by wood. It begins on the last peaks of the Prealpi Bellunesi (Monte Cor, La Posa) at 1,200 to 1,300 metres (3,900 to 4,300 ft) in elevation and decreases until the bottom of the valley. The highest elevation is 1,344 metres (4,409 ft). Two lakes are situated in the valley: lake of Santa Maria, and lake of Lago. These are located in a plain, the lowest part of the municipality at 224 metres (735 ft). The majority of the buildings are situated between the slope and the lakes.

== Demographic evolution ==
Historical population

Year	Pop.	±%
1861	?	—
1871	2,381	—
1881	2,369	−0.5%
1901	2,833	+19.6%
1911	3,037	+7.2%

Year	Pop.	±%
1921	3,425	+12.8%
1931	2,803	−18.2%
1936	2,239	−20.1%
1951	2,246	+0.3%
1961	2,259	+0.6%

Year	Pop.	±%
1971	2,080	−7.9%
1981	2,033	−2.3%
1991	2,016	−0.8%
2001	2,119	+5.1%

Source: Data from ISTAT

== Twin towns ==
Revine Lago is twinned with:

- Mitterdorf an der Raab, Austria
