= Soligo (river) =

Location
- Country: Italy

Physical characteristics
- Mouth: Piave
  - coordinates: 45°51′10″N 12°11′09″E

Basin features
- Progression: Piave→ Adriatic Sea

The Soligo is a river, formally known as Fiume Soligo, in the Province of Treviso in Italy. It is supplied by the artificial canal known as the Tajada, flowing out of the lakes of Revine Lago, known as Lago and Santa Maria - the stretch of the canal that flows after the village of Soller is known as the Soligo. It flows west along the Valmareno valley, before turning south at Follina and finally flowing into the Piave to the south-east of Falzè di Piave.
