= Susegana =

- Comune
- Comune di Susegana
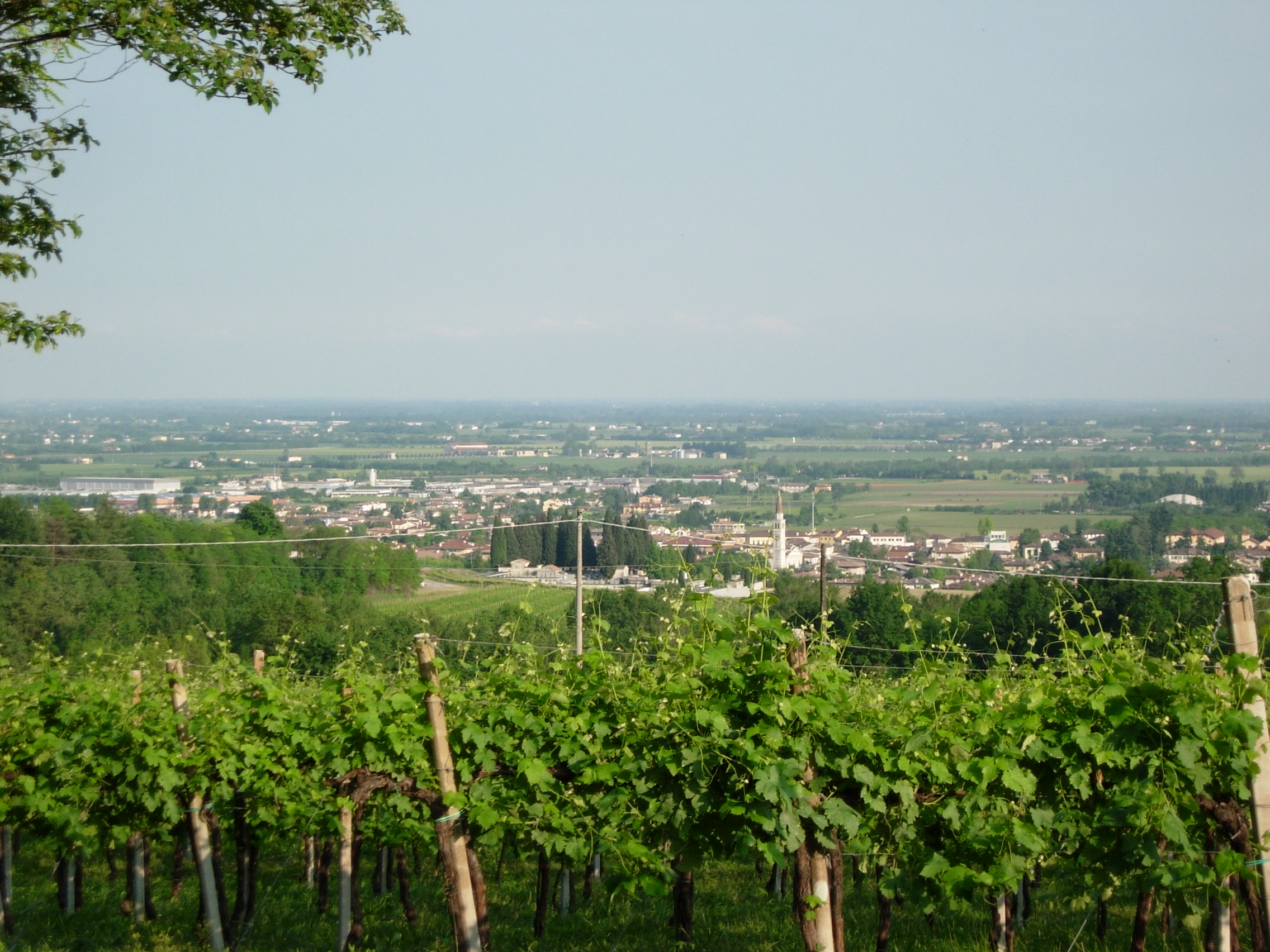

- Location within Italy Location within Veneto
- Coordinates: 45°51′N 12°15′E
- Country: Italy
- Region: Veneto
- Province: Treviso (TV)
- Frazioni: Colfosco, Collalto, Sant Anna, Crevada, Ponte della Priula

Government
  - Mayor: Gianni Montesel

Area
  - Total: 44.1 km^{2} (17.0 sq mi)
- Elevation: 76 m (249 ft)

Population (May 2024)
  - Total: 11,763
  - Density: 267/km^{2} (691/sq mi)
- Demonym: Suseganesi
- Time zone: UTC+1 (CET)
  - Summer (DST): UTC+2 (CEST)
- Postal code: 31058
- Dialing code: 0438
- Patron saint: Mary Auxiliatrix
- Saint day: May 24
- Website: Official website

Susegana is a comune (municipality) in the Province of Treviso in the Italian region Veneto, located about 45 km (28 mi) north of Venice and about 20 km (12 mi) north of Treviso.

== History ==
Traces of human presence from the late Bronze Age have been found in Susegana area. During the Roman age it was crossed by the Via Claudia Augusta, with the likely presence of some settlements near it. After the fall of the Western Roman Empire, the area was conquered by the Lombards; later the abbey of Follina acquired the area and favoured its flourishment. In the 12th century a castle was founded on a hill by the counts of Treviso (later of Collalto), also of Lombard origin. In 1245 counts received another hill, that of San Salvatore, by the commune of Treviso, and built here another fortress.

=== 1700s to the present ===
In 1797, the area around Susegana came under Austrian control as part of the partition of the Venetian Republic by the French Republic and Austrian Empire, following their signing of the Treaty of Campo Formido. In 1805, Austrian officials recorded Susegana as having 1,593 inhabitants. However, this period of Austrian control was short as it and the Veneto region came under the control of the Kingdom of Italy, a client state of the French Empire, after the Peace of Pressburg. Under French control, the Comune of San Salvatore was established in 1806 and controlled the area around modern Susegana. In 1810, San Salvatore was renamed Susigana, which evolved into the present Susegana.

The centre was badly damaged by bombings during World War I. After the 1960s, it expanded as an industrial centre thanks to the Zanussi plant (modern Electrolux), producing home appliances.

== Main sights ==
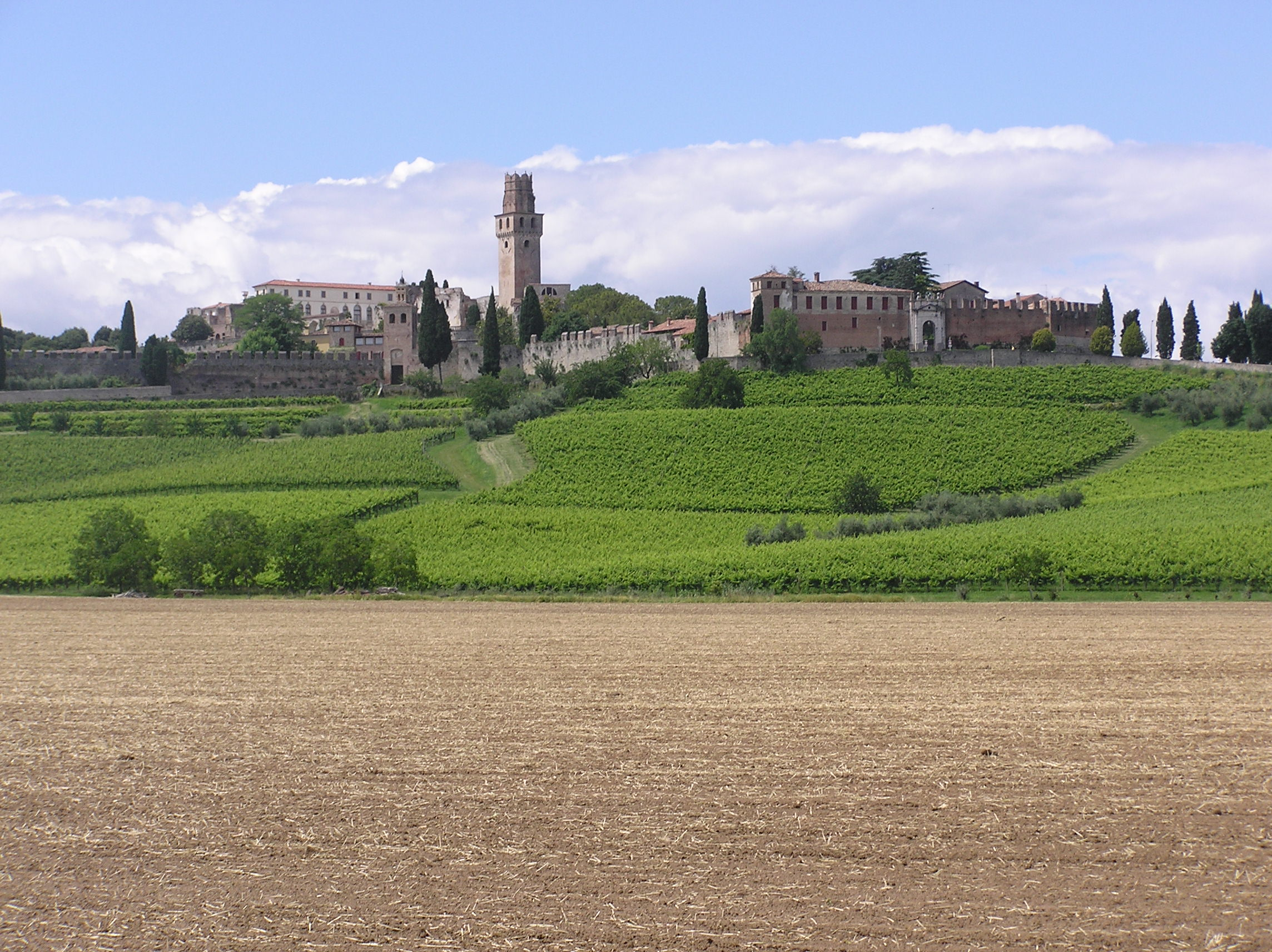
Castle of San Salvatore

The Church of Visitazione della Beata Vergine (13th century, rebuilt most likely in the 15th century) houses an altarpiece by Il Pordenone (16th century) and 15th frescoes, rediscovered after restorations begun in 1984. It was damaged during World War I, and later restored.

The Castello San Salvatore was begun in 1323 by Rambaldo III di Collalto and finished by his successor Schenella V. It has a double line of wall, enclosing an area of 32,000 m^{2} (340,000 sq ft). It was later enlarged and embellished, receiving the 17th century Palazzo Odoardo. It was nearly destroyed in the course of World War I by the Italian artillery, after the route of Caporetto.

Remains of a Roman bridge, the Susegana Bridge, are on the Piave river and the Crevada stream.
