= Refrontolo =

Refrontolo Refróntol Rex Frondium, Roncus Frondium (Latin)
- Comune
- Comune di Refrontolo

MENA transcription(s)
  - Arabic: رفرونتولو
  - Romanization: Rfrwntwlw; Rfruntwlw; Rfrwntulw; Rfruntulw; Rfrwntwlu; Rfruntwlu; Rfrwntulu; Rfruntulu
  - Armenian: Ռեֆրոնտոլո
  - Romanization: Ṛefrondolo; Ṙefrontolo; Rrefrvontvolvo

Asian transcription(s)
  - Cyrillic: Рефронтоло
  - Romanization: Ryefrontolo
  - Katakana: レフロントロ
  - Romanization: Refurontoro
  - Traditional: 雷夫龙托洛
  - Simplified: 雷夫龙托洛
  - Pinyin: Léifūlóngtuōluò
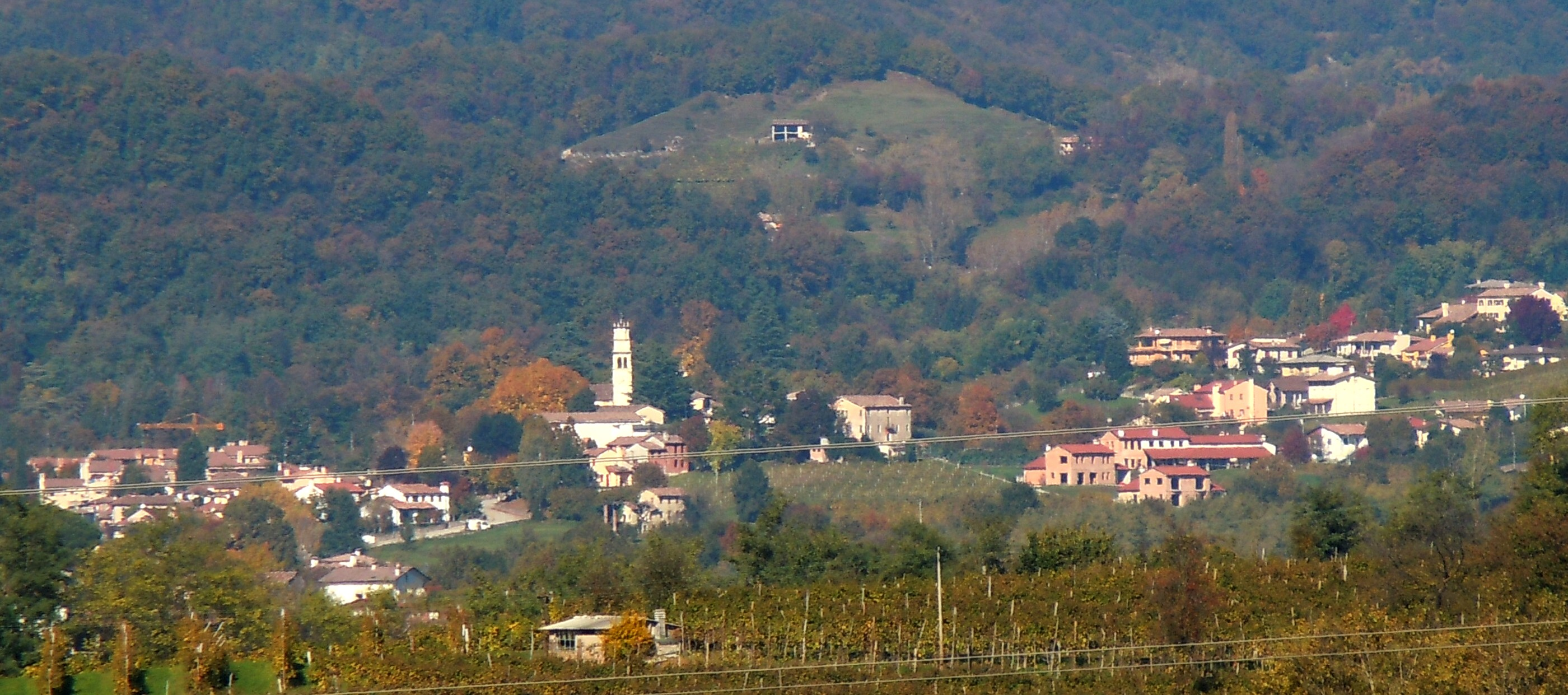

- Refrontolo (Italy)
- Coordinates: 45.9139°N 12.251°E (Note: Coordinates referencing the Municipal Building located at Piazza Vittorio Emanuele, 1 45.925555°N 12.207983°E.)
- Terna Group: 28.679 (Nove 71 - Pieve); 28.680 (Pieve - Trevignano); 28.792 (Nervesa - Nove 71)
- Union: European Union
- Country: Italy
- Region: Veneto
- Province: Treviso
- Treviso Domain: January 2, 1266 (Oath to Podestà)
- Collalto Fiefdom: February 3, 1312
- Incorporation: December 22, 1807 (Napoleon)
- Frazione: 1810
- Autonomy: 1889
- Frazione: 1928
- Autonomy: April 26, 1946
- Founder: Human Settlement
- Named for: From the Latin Ronco (deforested, tillaged), and Frontulo (a topographic indication referring to a wooded area), meaning a village between wooded hills
- Seat: Refrontolo, Pieve di Soligo
- Località: 9 Località: Boschi; Case Sparse; Crevada; Federa; Fornaci; Lot; Mire; Molinetto della Croda; Rorè

Government (Note: The last election took place on May 26th, 2019.)
  - Type: Municipal Corporation
  - Body: Municipal Council
  - Mayor: Mauro Canal (Per Refrontolo)
  - Deputy Mayor: Roberto Collodel
  - Assessor: Paola Lorenzon
  - Seats: Per Refrontolo [8] Passione Comune [3]

Area
  - Municipality: 5.03 sq mi (13.04 km^{2})
  - Rank: 2,470th
- Elevation (Note: The measure is defined as above the sea level from the point where the Municipal Building is located. The minimum and maximum values of the municipal territory were processed by ISTAT, and they were based on the digital land model (DEM), and on the data collected in the last census survey.) (Guildhall): 709 ft (216 m)
- Highest elevation: 1,250 ft (380 m)
- Lowest elevation: 279 ft (85 m)

Population (2019)
  - Municipality: 1,702
  - Estimate (2011): 1,824
  - Rank: 3,338th
  - Density: 338.0/sq mi (130.5/km^{2})
  - Rank: 4,675th
- Demonyms: Refrontolani; Refrontolesi

Foreigners (Note: Composition of the top 50% foreigners residing in the municipality.)
  - Romanians: 33.33%
  - Ukrainians: 09.72%
  - Bosnians: 05.56%
  - Britons: 05.56%
- Time zone: UTC+01:00 (CET)
  - Summer (DST): UTC+02:00 (CEST)
- Postal Code: 31020
- Dialing Code: 0438
- Geocode: TV
- ISO 3166 code: IT
- License Plate: I
- ISTAT Code: 026065
- Catasto: H220
- Patron Saint: Margaret the Virgin
- Saint Day: July 20
- Sister City: Équemauville
- Seismic Zone: 2
- Climatic Area: E
- Degree Day: 2,623
- Website: Comune di Refrontolo
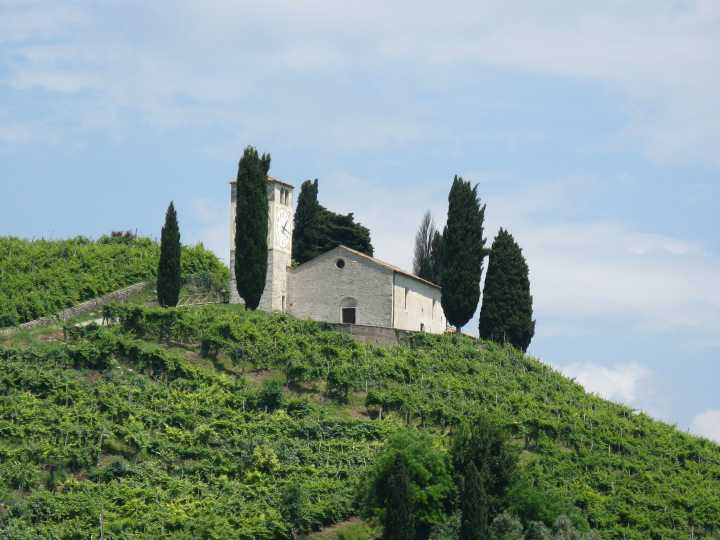

UNESCO World Heritage Site
- Official name: The Prosecco Hills of Conegliano and Valdobbiadene (Italian: Le Colline del Prosecco di Conegliano e Valdobbiadene)
- Location: Italy
- Part of: Core Zone, Buffer Zone
- Includes: Hilly land (not necessarily coinciding with the administrative boundaries) falling within the Valdobbiadene, Miane, Farra di Soligo, Pieve di Soligo, Follina, Cison di Valmarino, Refrontolo, San Pietro di Feletto, Revine Lago, Tarzo, Vidor, and Vittorio Veneto municipal areas for the Core Zone, in addition to Conegliano, Susegana, and San Vendemiano municipalities for the Buffer Zone
- Criteria: Cultural: V
- Reference: 1571
- Inscription: 2019 (43rd Session)
- Extensions: 1,302.76 ha
- Endangered: No
- Area: 20,334.2 ha (50,247 acres)
- Buffer zone: 43,988.2 ha (108,697 acres)
- Website: Conegliano Valdobbiadene
- Coordinates: 45.953028°N 12.226111°E

Historically Part Of
- Venetic People: 6th–1st c. BCE
- Roman Republic: 238BCE–27BC
- Roman Empire: 027CE–471CE
- Byzantine Empire: 471CE–476CE
- Kingdom of Italy: 476CE–493CE
- Ostrogothic Kingdom: 493CE–553CE
- Lombard Kingdom: 568CE–774CE
- March of Treviso: ???CE–697CE
- Republic of Venice: 0697CE–1797CE
- Cisalpine Republic: 1797CE–1802CE
- Italian Republic: 1802CE–1805CE
- Kingdom of Italy: 1805CE–1814CE
- Lombardy–Venetia: 1815CE–1866CE
- Kingdom of Italy: 1861CE–1946CE
- Italian Republic: 1946CE–Present

Refrontolo (Venetian: Refróntol) is a comune (municipality) in the Province of Treviso in the Italian region Veneto, located about 50 kilometres (31 miles) north of Venice and about 30 km (19 mi) north of Treviso, representing the third smallest municipality by number of inhabitants (1,732) in the province, preceded only by Portobuffolé and Monfumo. It is located in a hilly viewpoint between Quartier del Piave and Montello, and it is crossed by the Prosecco and Conegliano-Valdobbiadene Hills Wine Road (Italian: Strada del Prosecco e Vini dei Colli Conegliano e Valdobbiadene) established in 1966. The municipality is in fact famous for the production of the Marzemino wine (called Colli di Conegliano Refrontolo Passito DOCG). Since July 7, 2019, Refrontolo's hills have been inscribed as an UNESCO World Heritage Site as The Prosecco Hills of Conegliano and Valdobbiadene (Italian: Le Colline del Prosecco di Conegliano e Valdobbiadene).

Refrontolo borders the following municipalities: Cison di Valmarino, Pieve di Soligo, San Pietro di Feletto, Susegana, Tarzo.

== Demographics ==
=== Overview ===
In 2016 the natural growth rate of Refrontolo was -6.9, with 11 newborns, 23 deceased, and thus a natural balance of -12. The people entering Refrontolo from other municipalities were 43 (39 were instead leaving), the ones entering from abroad were 7 (5 were leaving Italy), while 1 was written in the registry because of administrative corrections (3 removed), for a total migratory balance of 4, and a migration rate of 2.3. Overall the total growth rate was decreasing (-4.6), and with a population of 1,747 on January 1, and 1,739 on December 31, the average number of people living in the municipality was 1,743.

Refrontolo's Population From 1861 To 2018
| Year | Population | | | Households | | | | ± | | | | |
| | N. | ±% | ♂% | N. | | Size | | Births | | Deaths | | Δ |
| | | | | N. | ±% | N. | ±% | N. | ±% | N. | ±% | |
|---|---|---|---|---|---|---|---|---|---|---|---|---|
| 1871 | 1,310 | −−−−−− | −−−−− | −−− | −−−−−− | −−− | −−−−−− | −− | −−−−−−− | −− | −−−−−−− | −−− |
| 1881 | 1,290 | −1.50% | −−−−− | −−− | −−−−−− | −−− | −−−−−− | −− | −−−−−−− | −− | −−−−−−− | −−− |
| 1901 | 1,469 | +13.9% | −−−−− | −−− | −−−−−− | −−− | −−−−−− | −− | −−−−−−− | −− | −−−−−−− | −−− |
| 1911 | 1,882 | +28.1% | −−−−− | −−− | −−−−−− | −−− | −−−−−− | −− | −−−−−−− | −− | −−−−−−− | −−− |
| 1921 | 2,177 | +15.7% | −−−−− | −−− | −−−−−− | −−− | −−−−−− | −− | −−−−−−− | −− | −−−−−−− | −−− |
| 1931 | 2,271 | +4.30% | −−−−− | −−− | −−−−−− | −−− | −−−−−− | −− | −−−−−−− | −− | −−−−−−− | −−− |
| 1936 | 2,163 | −4.80% | −−−−− | −−− | −−−−−− | −−− | −−−−−− | −− | −−−−−−− | −− | −−−−−−− | −−− |
| 1951 | 2,072 | −4.20% | −−−−− | −−− | −−−−−− | −−− | −−−−−− | −− | −−−−−−− | −− | −−−−−−− | −−− |
| 1961 | 1,686 | −18.6% | −−−−− | −−− | −−−−−− | −−− | −−−−−− | −− | −−−−−−− | −− | −−−−−−− | −−− |
| 1971 | 1,582 | −6.20% | −−−−− | −−− | −−−−−− | −−− | −−−−−− | −− | −−−−−−− | −− | −−−−−−− | −−− |
| 1981 | 1,662 | +5.10% | −−−−− | −−− | −−−−−− | −−− | −−−−−− | −− | −−−−−−− | −− | −−−−−−− | −−− |
| 1991 | 1,708 | +2.80% | −−−−− | −−− | −−−−−− | −−− | −−−−−− | −− | −−−−−−− | −− | −−−−−−− | −−− |
| 2001 | 1,805 | +5.70% | −−−−− | −−− | −−−−−− | −−− | −−−−−− | −− | −−−−−−− | −− | −−−−−−− | −−− |
| 2002 | 1,802 | −0.28% | 51.4% | −−− | −−−−−− | −−− | −−−−−− | 19 | −−−−−−− | 14 | −−−−−−− | +05 |
| 2003 | 1,809 | +0.39% | 51.5% | 680 | −−−−−− | 2.66 | −−−−−− | 11 | −42.11% | 17 | +21.43% | −06 |
| 2004 | 1,820 | +0.61% | 51.2% | 689 | +1.32% | 2.64 | −0.75% | 18 | +63.64% | 11 | −35.29% | +07 |
| 2005 | 1,800 | −1.10% | 50.6% | 686 | −0.44% | 2.62 | −0.76% | 21 | +16.67% | 16 | +45.45% | +05 |
| 2006 | 1,798 | −0.11% | 50.7% | 691 | +0.73% | 2.6 | −0.76% | 14 | −33.33% | 13 | −18.75% | +01 |
| 2007 | 1,793 | −0.28% | 50.8% | 696 | +0.72% | 2.58 | −0.77% | 17 | +21.43% | 20 | +53.85% | −03 |
| 2008 | 1,799 | +0.33% | 50.5% | 707 | +1.58% | 2.54 | −1.55% | 21 | +23.53% | 20 | ±00.00% | +01 |
| 2009 | 1,815 | +0.89% | 49.6% | 717 | +1.41% | 2.53 | −0.39% | 06 | −71.43% | 14 | −30.00% | −08 |
| 2010 | 1,863 | +2.64% | 49.7% | 717 | ±0.00% | 2.6 | +2.77% | 17 | +183.33% | 16 | +14.29% | +01 |
| 2011 | 1,814 | −2.63% | 49.7% | 729 | +1.67% | 2.49 | −4.23% | 13 | −23.53% | 13 | −18.75% | ±00 |
| 2012 | 1,797 | −0.94% | 49.4% | 730 | +0.14% | 2.46 | −1.20% | 22 | +69.23% | 22 | +69.23% | ±00 |
| 2013 | 1,786 | −0.61% | 49.4% | 726 | −0.55% | 2.46 | ±0.00% | 10 | −54.55% | 15 | −31.82% | −05 |
| 2014 | 1,764 | −1.23% | 49.4% | 716 | −1.38% | 2.46 | ±0.00% | 15 | +50.00% | 21 | +40.00% | −06 |
| 2015 | 1,747 | −0.96% | 49.2% | 711 | −0.70% | 2.46 | ±0.00% | 08 | −46.67% | 17 | −19.05% | −09 |
| 2016 | 1,739 | −0.46% | 49.5% | 708 | −0.42% | 2.46 | ±0.00% | 11 | +37.50% | 23 | +35.29% | −12 |
| 2017 | 1,732 | −0.40% | −−−−− | 710 | +0.28% | 2.44 | −0.81% | 07 | −36.36% | 16 | −100.0% | −09 |
| 2018 | 1,702 | −1.73% | −−−−− | 711 | +0.14% | 2.39 | −2.05% | 07 | ±00.00% | 24 | +22.47% | −17 |

Migratory Flow
| Year | From | | | To | | | Net Migration Rate | | Aliens | | |
| | Italy | Abroad | Other | Italy | Abroad | Other | Abroad | Total | N. | % | ♂% |
|---|---|---|---|---|---|---|---|---|---|---|---|
| 2002 | 29 | 02 | 00 | 41 | 00 | 00 | +02 | −10 | −−− | −−−− | −−−−− |
| 2003 | 53 | 10 | 00 | 50 | 00 | 00 | +10 | +13 | −−− | −−−− | −−−−− |
| 2004 | 48 | 08 | 00 | 45 | 07 | 00 | +01 | +04 | −−− | −−−− | −−−−− |
| 2005 | 23 | 02 | 00 | 47 | 03 | 00 | −01 | −25 | 060 | 3.3% | 51.7% |
| 2006 | 33 | 13 | 00 | 49 | 00 | 00 | +13 | −03 | 065 | 3.6% | 49.2% |
| 2007 | 56 | 03 | 00 | 61 | 00 | 00 | +03 | −02 | 067 | 3.7% | 52.2% |
| 2008 | 44 | 08 | 00 | 45 | 02 | 00 | +06 | +05 | 076 | 4.2% | 47.4% |
| 2009 | 56 | 05 | 00 | 37 | 00 | 00 | +05 | +24 | 084 | 4.6% | 44.0% |
| 2010 | 73 | 08 | 00 | 31 | 03 | 00 | +05 | +47 | 102 | 5.5% | 45.1% |
| 2011 | 50 | 11 | 04 | 55 | 18 | 00 | −07 | −08 | 093 | 5.1% | 43.0% |
| 2012 | 40 | 15 | 04 | 59 | 12 | 05 | +03 | −17 | 109 | 6.1% | 42.2% |
| 2013 | 39 | 06 | 15 | 55 | 10 | 01 | −04 | −06 | 105 | 5.9% | 42.9% |
| 2014 | 41 | 05 | 08 | 56 | 10 | 04 | −05 | −16 | 102 | 5.8% | 43.1% |
| 2015 | 34 | 01 | 03 | 36 | 06 | 04 | −05 | −08 | 090 | 5.2% | 38.9% |
| 2016 | 43 | 07 | 01 | 39 | 05 | 03 | +02 | +04 | 074 | 4.3% | 35.1% |
| 2017 | 30 | 05 | 01 | 32 | 01 | 01 | +04 | +02 | −−− | −−−− | −−−−− |
| 2018 | 33 | 06 | 02 | 46 | 03 | 05 | +03 | −13 | −−− | −−−− | −−−−− |

== Economy ==
The locality is particularly suited for wine production, thanks to the presence of constant currents of fresh and dry air that allow the natural drying of the grapes. In the municipality there are in fact fourteen wineries, and one of them is also a bottler. Typical, being the viticulture a rooted and integrated practice of the area, are the vineyards, historically cultivated as espaliers. Other forms of traditional and/or historical cultivation are the Sylvoz (espalier), overturned, and double-inverted. Cultivated vines are Prosecco, Marzemino, Verdiso Zentil, and Manzoni Bianco. The density of the vines is 2,500 Ha.

=== Refrontolo Passito DOCG ===
Marzemino has a centuries-old history, and distant origins. Also known in Veneto with the synonyms of Berzamino, Barzemin and Bassamino, it would later spread to Lombardy, Emilia, Friuli, and Trentino. It is believed that the Marzemino vine spread in Carinthia thanks to the Roman colonists, taking its name from Marzimin, a village in that region, and that from this area the cultivation subsequently extended to the Venetian regions. In the fifteenth century Marzemino was known throughout Padania and Friuli; in the Adige valley it was introduced by the militias of the Republic of Venice in the period of its maximum expansion. In fact, towards the middle of the sixteenth century the wine produced from this vine was one of the most appreciated among noble families, and it is precisely Marzemino that is mentioned in the second act of the famous opera Don Giovanni by Mozart, with the phrase "Versa il vino! Eccellente Marzimino!" (the quote is a clear reference to the Treviso area and not to the Trentino one, and everything is proven by the origin of Lorenzo Da Ponte, author of the libretto of Mozart's opera, who lived as a young man on these hills).

Today the Treviso vine is known as Marzemino of Refrontolo, from which the Refrontolo Passito is produced, and it is the drying technique that differentiates it from all the other varieties, making it unique and sought after as a "black pearl" in an area suited for white wines.

Refrontolo Passito is found within the Colli di Conegliano Refrontolo Passito DOCG zone, in a very limited area defined by the municipalities of Pieve di Soligo, San Pietro di Feletto, and in particular by the hills of Refrontolo, where the old biotype of Marzemino of Refrontolo is cultivated, since it is the only one that produces suitable grapes to obtain Refrontolo Passito. The Marzemino grapes are harvested in October, and they must be at least 95%, while the remaining 5% can be non-aromatic red grapes recommended or authorized by the province of Treviso. Subsequently, the grapes are placed on traditional racks where they dry up until the week of Christmas in order to reach a minimum alcoholic strength of 14 degrees. The maximum yield of grapes into wine must not exceed 45%. The vinification is then followed by maturation in small oak barrels with various decantations up until it becomes clear for its bottling in spring. An aging in the bottle for at least three months precedes the release on the market, which cannot take place before March 1 after the harvest. Only about thirty companies produce the “pearl”, for an annual production of about 160,000 0.75cl-bottles, which are difficult to find, as admirers try to grab at least a few bottles of this excellence.

Refrontolo Passito is a red dessert wine made from partially dried grapes. It has a deep ruby red color and an aroma of blackberries. It is served at 14–15°C and pairs with lower-sugar desserts, dry pastries, plum jam tarts, sbrisolona cake, and blue cheeses. The wine has a sweet flavor profile with balanced alcohol and acidity, reaching maturity in 10–12 months.

== Culture ==
=== Folklore ===
==== The bòna man ====
The tradition of New Year's greetings, involving above all the little ones, who, visiting the homes of relatives and acquaintances, received, in exchange of a greeting nursery rhyme (the bòna man), some sweets or some change. The custom was also widespread among the adults, and generally consisted of seasonal nuts.

==== 'L panevìn ====
Fire ritual that still takes place, above all thanks to the initiative of the Pro Loco, on the evening of January 5, the epiphany's eve. Now practiced with folkloristic accents, once a tradition, rich in cultural meanings, consisting of different phases.

==== 'L porzhèl de Sant'Antoni ====
It was a pig, donated by a devotee, who soon became accustomed to going around the houses of the village, where it received the lavadura. It was then killed on the day of Saint Anthony, January 17, put up for auction, and the proceeds donated to the poorest or to charitable works.

==== Carneval ====
Neighboring families, or those of the same district, were used to gather at the sound of an accordion, to dance and consume crostoi, frìtoe, and castagnòle. On the last Thursday of the carnival (dióba zhozhoèr) pieces of lard (zhózoi), or other pieces of pork, were offered to the beggars, who stuck them on wooden skewers, while during the last Friday of the carnival (vèndre gnocolèr), gnocchi were a must for the villagers.

==== San Valentin ====
The festivity is summarized in the proverb: San Valentin, the naranzhe picade al spin, translatable into Valentine's Day, the oranges attached to the thorn; lovers picked up a branch of hawthorn, and stuck an orange into each thorn. The homage was then placed, during the night, on the threshold of the beloved's house.

=== Organizations ===
| Organization | Type | Notes |
|---|---|---|
| A.V.I.S. - Sez. di Pieve di Soligo e Refrontolo | Volunteering | Blood Donation |
| ASD Refrontolo Calcio | Sports Club | Football Club |
| Associazione Animalista Mici Felici | Volunteering | Animal Rescue Group |
| Associazione Due Cuori per la Vita | Grassroots | Health Promotion |
| Associazione Lyra | Cultural Center | Music |
| Associazione Molinetto della Croda | Volunteering | Museum |
| Associazione Musicale "Giovani Accordi" e "Piccolo Coro" di Refrontolo | Cultural Center | Musical Ensemble |
| Associazione Pro Loco | Grassroots | Pro Loco |
| Circolo Ricreativo Arcobaleno | Cultural Center | After-School Activity |
| Comitato Refrontolo-Brasile | Volunteering | Interculturalism |
| Gruppi Familiari Al-Anon - Forza e Speranza per Amici e Familiari di Alcolisti | Volunteering | Alcoholics Anonymous |
| Gruppo Alpini di Refrontolo | Corps | Alpini |
| Gruppo Marciatori | Sports Club | Racewalking |
| Legambiente del Vittoriese | Volunteering | Legambiente |
| Protezione Civile - Gruppo di Refrontolo | Volunteering | Protezione Civile |
| Riserva Zona Alpi | Sports Club | Hunting |
| Squadra Palio delle Botti di Refrontolo | Grassroots | Competitive Barrel Rolling |

== Government ==
The municipality has its own functions, and those conferred by the state and regional laws, according to the principle of subsidiarity. It contributes to the determination of the objectives contained in the plans and the programs of the state and the regions and, within the boundaries of its legal competence, provides for their specification and implementation, as well as for the exercise of all the functions suitable to satisfy the interests and needs of the community, with the aim of reaching and consolidating, with a programming method, those values that allow a better quality of life, in compliance with the state and regional laws. The municipality can also carry out its functions through the activities that can be adequately exercised by the autonomous initiative of the citizens and their social formations.

The municipal governing body is composed by the Municipal Council, the City Committee, and the Mayor.

=== Municipal Council ===
Per Refrontolo Passione Comune
| Name | Role | Body(ies) | Assignment(s) |
|---|---|---|---|
| Mauro Canal | Mayor | Mayor | Urban Planning, Housing Authority, HR, Agriculture and Economic Development, Environment, Civil Defense, Immigration Service, Government Budget |
| Roberto Collodel | Deputy Mayor | City Committee, Municipal Council | Public Works, Transport Infrastructure, Public Security and Law Enforcement, Preservation, Data Management, Levies |
| Paola Lorenzon | Assessor | City Committee, Municipal Council | Social Services, Youth Program, Sport, Culture, Education, Associationism, Tourism |
| Federica Meneghel | Councilor | Municipal Council | Majority Leader, Environment (adjunct), Tourism (adjunct) |
| Gabriella Campodall'Orto | Councilor | Municipal Council | |
| Andrea Della Colletta | Councilor | Municipal Council | Agriculture and Economic Development (adjunct), Preservation (adjunct) |
| Ylenia Meneghin | Councilor | Municipal Council | Sport (adjunct) |
| Francesca Doimo | Councilor | Municipal Council | Immigration Service (adjunct), Associationism (adjunct), Levies (adjunct) |
| Gianpiero De Diana | Councilor | Municipal Council | Minority Leader |
| Es Saadiya Barouz | Councilor | Municipal Council | |
| Nicola Attilio Bottega | Councilor | Municipal Council | |

Historical Councilors
1868: Andrea Sanzovo (Substitute), Antonio Calcinoni (Substitute), Antonio Lava, Antonio Lorenzon, Giacomo Morona, Giovanni Bottega, Giovanni Tittonel, Girolamo Negri, Giuseppe Baldo, Gregorio Lorenzon (City Committee), Luigi Antoniazzi, Luigi Donadel, Paolo Pros, Pietro De Stefani (City Committee).
1890: (Note: April 14, 1901.) Celeste Bottega, Ernesto Nascinben, Giacomo De Noni, Luigi Donadel, Giacomo Meneghetti, Gino Spada, Giovanni De Anna, Giuseppe Corradini, Giuseppe Pollesel (Chancellor), Italo Galli, Pasquale Fortran, Pietro Colles, Pietro Soldan, Pietro Stefanelli, Vincenzo Bottega.
1909: (Note: According to data relative to October 10, 1909, June 15, 1913, and June 2, 1914.) Angelo Tormena, Aristide Serra, Bortolo Brait, Celeste Meneghin, Giovanni Bottega, Giuseppe Corradin, Giuseppe De Lozzo, Giuseppe Lorenzon, Giuseppe N.N. Francesco Lava, Luigi Donadel, Natale Meneghetti, Nicolò Spada, Pietro Ceschin, Pietro Stefanelli.
1917: Aristide Serra, Benvenuto Pol, Bortolo Brait, Deodato Lorenzon, G. B. Faustino Brunetti, Giovanni Bottega, Giovanni De Lotto, Giovanni Donadel, Giuseppe Corradini, Giuseppe De Lozzo, Giuseppe Meneghin, Giuseppe Pilla (son of Angelo), Leone De Toffoli, Natale Meneghetti, Nicolò Spada, Pietro Ceschin.
1946: Adolfo De Luca, Annibale Trentin, Bernardino Lot, Celso Busetti, Emilio Zaccaron, Giacomo De Noni, Giovanni De Martin, Giuseppe Bottega, Giuseppe Donadel, Isidoro Lot, Leone Morgan, Luigi Lorenzon, Pietro De Nardo.
1951: Antonio Collodel, Augusto Lorenzon, Giovanni Bernardi, Domenico Lorenzon, Giovanni De Martin, Giovanni Introvigne, Giuseppe Liessi, Giuseppe Meneghetti, Gregorio De Stefani, Italo Cesca, Luigi Lorenzon, Luigi Zanco, Silvio Lot, Vittore Casagrande.
1956: Abramo Lorenzon, Alessio De Noni, Enrico Miotto, Erminio Ceschin, Giovanni De Luca, Giovanni Lorenzon, Giuseppe Zanutto, Guerrino Balbinot, Leopoldo Fortran, Mario Fortran, Pier Luigi De Stefani, Pietro Bottega, Regina Meneghetti, Renato Nadalin.
1960: Abramo Lorenzon, Alessio De Noni, Antonio Della Colletta, Antonio Lorenzon, Bernardo Lot, Daniele Collodel, Enrico Miotto, Giuseppe Lorenzon, Gregorio De Stefani, Guerrino Balbinot, Livio Zaccaron, Regina Meneghin, Rino Granzotto, Vito Dalle Ceste.
1964: Alessio De Noni, Bernardo Lot, Erminio Ceschin, Germano Collodel, Gino Callegher, Giovanni De Martin, Giovanni Lorenzon, Guerrino Balbinot, Livio Zaccaron, Mansueto Bernardi, Pier Luigi De Stefani, Pietro Lorenzon, Regina Meneghetti, Rino Granzotto.
1970: Alvise Dal Vecchio, Antonio Cesca, Arvedo Benedetti, Bruno Biasi, Ferdinando Lot, Germano Collodel, Giacinto Tomasi, Giovanni Lorenzon, Livio Zaccaron, Luigi De Stefani, Mansueto Bernardi, Pier Luigi De Stefani, Pietro Lorenzon, Sergio Antoniazzi.
1975: Angelo Lot, Antonio son of G. Lorenzon, Antonio N.N. V. Lorenzon, Bernardo Lot, Domenico Rosolen, Ennio Lot, Giuseppe Zanutto, Livio Zaccaron, Luigi De Martin, Luigino Antoniazzi, Margherita Meneghetti, Maria Lucchetta, Renzo Liessi, Sante Toffoli.
1980: Angelo Lot, Antonio Lorenzon, Beniamino De Stefani, Carlo Bertollo, Domenico Rosolen, Ferdinando Bortolotto, Giuseppe Zanutto, Livio Zaccaron, Luciano Nannini, Luisa De Stefani, Margherita Meneghetti, Mario Zanzotto, Renzo Liessi, Sante Toffoli.
1985: Antonio Lorenzon, Carlo Bertollo, Gino Lot, Giuseppe Bottega, Giuseppe Zanutto, Leo Zara, Luciano Nannini, Paolo De Stefani, Paolo Miotto, Pier Luigi De Stefani, Pierluigi Bernardi, Pietro Lorenzon, Raffaele De Noni, Sergio Lot.
1990: Carlo Bertollo, Claudio Lucchet, Elena Lucia Antoniazzi, Enrico Dalle Ceste, Ferdinando Bortolotto, Giannino Bernardi, Gino Lot, Giuseppe Bottega, Leo Zara, Paolo Miotto, Pierluigi Bernardi, Raffaele De Noni, Roberto Morgan, Sergio Lot.
1995: Anna De Nadai, Claudio Lucchet, Elena Lucia Antoniazzi, Giuseppe Liessi, Orietta Lot, Pietro Lorenzon, Quanito Zambon, Raffaele De Noni, Roberto Morgan, Sante Toffoli, Valeria Dal Vecchio, Valter Bastianel.
1999: Carlo Bertollo, Carlo Callegher, Claudio Lucchet, Elena Lucia Antoniazzi, (Note: Junta Member, Visiting Assessor) Federica Trevisanello, Giampiero De Luca, Giuseppe Liessi, Giuseppe Sossai, Manlio Boscheratto, Quanito Zambon, Roberto Collodel, Roberto Morgan, Rosa Rizzo.
2009: Alberto Dalle Ceste, Andrea Della Colletta, Bruno Piol, Claudio Lucchet, Luca Lorenzetto, Luciano Salvador, Maria Pia Orecchia, Mauro Canal, Mirko Della Colletta, Pietro Lorenzon, Renzo Zanet, Serena Antoniazzi.
2014: Barbara Teo, Cristina Foltran, Elisabetta Cadamuro, Fabio Tittonel, Luca Bernardi, Mauro Canal, Mirko Della Colletta, Nicola Antoniazzi, Pasquale Lorenzon, Roberto Collodel, Roberto De Stefani.
2019: Andrea Della Colletta, Es Saadiya Barouz, Federica Meneghel, Francesca Doimo, Gabriella Campodall'Orto, Gianpiero De Diana, Nicola Attilio Bottega, Paola Lorenzon, Roberto Collodel, Ylenia Meneghin.

=== Mayor ===
The mayor is the body responsible for the municipal administration, and performs functions of representation, presidency, and superintendency, and eventually of Government Officer as established by the Legislative Decree 267/2000, which also defines the procedures for his election, the cases of incompatibility and ineligibility to the office, its status, and the causes of termination and forfeiture of office.

==== Administrative duties ====
The mayor has competences and powers of direction, supervision and control of the activity of the assessors, and of the management and executive bodies, by the issuance of directives to the municipal secretary, the general manager, if appointed, and to the managers of the administrative services, verifying the compliance of the administrative management results in accordance with the given guidelines.

He appoints the members of the municipal council, choosing among them the deputy mayor, and has the power to revoke them by giving motivated communication to the council; he also appoints the managers of the public administration, assigning and defining the needed executive offices and the external collaboration assignments according to the criteria established by the articles 109 and 110 of the Legislative Decree 267/2000, as well as by the municipal statute and regulations.

Moreover, he promotes and takes initiatives to ensure that the offices, services, special companies, institutions, and joint stock companies belonging to the municipality carry out their activities according to the guidelines indicated by the municipal council, or the objectives defined by the City Committee, summons the conference between the representatives of all the interested parties in order to verify the possibility of realizing the program agreement and promoting its conclusion (even at the request of one or more of the interested parties), and has initiative and liaison powers with the bodies of popular participation in the local administration, calling meetings for referendums on matters of exclusive local competence, and thus setting up the office for the referendum operations.

==== List of mayors of Refrontolo ====
(Note: Until 1999 the name of the mayor and the list of councilors are reported in alphabetical order, regardless of the electoral list in which they were elected.) (Note: Until the Fascist period the data are very fragmented.)

Undocumented Public Administration Centre League/League-FI Centre-Left
| Mayor | Period | | Affiliation |
|---|---|---|---|
| Corrado Stefanelli | 1868 (Note: Refrontolo also includes the fraction of Barbisano.) (Note: Conegliano electoral district.) (Note: 8 Political Electors, 135 Administrative Electors.) | 1890 | Undocumented |
| Nicolò Spada | 1890 | 1909 | Undocumented |
| G. B. Faustino Brunetti | 1909 | 1914 | Undocumented |
| Giuseppe Corradini | 1917 | 1917 | Undocumented |
| Arturo Marchetti (Note: From Casalecchio di Reno) (Note: Prefectural Commissioner of Pieve di Soligo, Refrontolo, and Susegana municipalities.) (Note: Prefectural Deputy Commissioner, Oscar Borrello, acting, A. Meneghetti and G. Bottega) | 1918 | 1919 | Undocumented |
| Giuseppe Pilla | 1921 | 1926 | Undocumented |
| Pietro Colles (Note: Podestà) | 1927 | 1927 | PNF |
| Lorenzo Toffano (Note: Prefectural Commissioner. Assistance of the municipal secretary Giuseppe Flais.) | 8 November 1945 (Note: With a prefectural decree, on November 8, 1945, the municipality of Refrontolo is reconstituted.) | 11 April 1946 | Prefecture |
| Gregorio De Stefani (Note: From the 12th of April 1946, to the 01st of August 1946, the role of mayor had been held by Adolfo De Luca.) | 1 August 1946 | 7 June 1951 | Undocumented |
| Angelo Fregolent | 7 June 1951 | 15 June 1956 | Undocumented |
| Isidoro Lorenzon | 16 June 1956 | 21 November 1960 | Undocumented |
| Renzo Liessi | 22 November 1960 | 11 December 1964 | Undocumented |
| Renzo Liessi | 12 December 1964 | 14 July 1970 | Undocumented |
| Renzo Liessi | 15 July 1970 | 16 July 1975 | Undocumented |
| Quanito Zambon | 17 July 1975 | 15 July 1980 | Undocumented |
| Quanito Zambon | 16 July 1980 | 17 June 1985 | Undocumented |
| Pietro Lorenzon | 18 June 1985 | 1 June 1990 | Undocumented |
| Pietro Lorenzon | 2 June 1990 | 22 April 1995 | Undocumented |
| Carlo Bertollo | 23 April 1995 | 12 June 1999 | Civic List |
| Sante Toffoli | 13 June 1999 | 12 June 2004 | Civic List |
| Mariagrazia Morgan | 13 June 2004 | 6 June 2009 | Insieme per Refrontolo |
| Mariagrazia Morgan | 7 June 2009 | 24 May 2014 | Per Refrontolo |
| Loredana Collodel | 25 May 2014 | 25 May 2019 | Progetto Refrontolo |
| Mauro Canal | 26 May 2019 | Incumbent | Per Refrontolo |

== Notable people ==
- Domenico Capretta (1813–1883) – Abbot
- Antonio Maria Antoniazzi (1872–1925) – Astronomer (born in Collalto, at the time part of Refrontolo, today a frazione of Susegana)
- Piero Dalle Ceste (1912–1974) – Painter
- Angelo Lorenzon (1927–1978) – Painter, sculptor, engraver (born in Sernaglia della Battaglia on March 14, 1927, he moved with his family to Refrontolo, where he lived and worked until 10 June 1978, the day of his death)

- Emma Ciardi (1879–1933) – Painter (in the last period of her life, she established her summer residence in Refrontolo)

== Essential bibliography ==
- Archivio di Stato di Treviso. Coll. 66/1 R/N/1, Mappa Ridotta 1812; 15/5 TN 1 N. 92, TN 2 N. 93, TN 3 N. 94, Caseggiati Anno 1812; Sommarioni Catasto Nap. Coll. 66/1 B/1 B/2 B/3. Refrontolo: Catasto Napoleonico 1812 (in Italian). Treviso.
- Archivio di Stato di Venezia. Refrontolo: Notifiche al Censo Provvisorio del Catasto Napoleonico del 1812. Atti Preparatori al Catasto Austriaco (in Italian). Venice.
- Archivio Comunale di Refrontolo. Delibere della Giunta e del Consiglio Comunale dal 1919 al 1927 e dal 1946 al 2003. Fogli di Famiglia, Vecchia Anagrafe 1890-1924 (in Italian). Refrontolo.
- Archivio Parrochiale di Santa Margherita di Refrontolo. Registri Parrochiali dei Battesimi, dei Matrimoni e dei Morti dal 1624. Bollettino Parrochiale (Anni 1973-2003) (in Italian). Refrontolo.
- Alpago Novello, L.; Trevisi, L.; Zava, A. (1882). Monografia Agraria dei Distretti di Conegliano, Oderzo e Vittorio. Atti della Giunta Agraria per l'Inchiesta Agraria e sulle Condizioni della Classe Agricola (in Italian). Vol. V, Tome II. Rome.
- Vv.Aa. (1997). Pieve di Soligo e la Gastaldia di Solighetto dal Medioevo all'Età Contemporanea (in Italian). Pieve di Soligo.
- Battistella, O.; Lazzari, A.; Garzoni, T. (1927). Guida di Treviso e Provincia: Nuovo Indicatore Commerciale, Industriale, Professionale, Amministrativo, con Notizie Storico-Artistiche (Biennio 1926-27) (in Italian). Treviso.
- Bevilacqua, Silvia (2001). Arte per il Sacro nel Quartier del Piave e nel Feletto (in Italian). Pieve di Soligo: Canova. ISBN 978-8884090614.
- Boerio, Giuseppe (1856). Dizionario del Dialetto Veneziano (in Italian). Venezia: G. Cecchini Royal Press.
- Cengarle, Federica; Chittolini, Giorgio; Varanini, Gian Maria (1995). Castelli tra Piave e Livenza. Atti del III Convegno (in Italian). Vittorio Veneto: Schede d'Archivio. pp. 185-206 [Per Una Storia delle Fortificazioni della Valmareno e del Quartier del Piave nel Medioevo (Secoli XI-XIV), G. P. Cagnin].
- Ceschin, C. (1934). Refrontolo: Memorie e Ricordi (in Italian). Pieve di Soligo.
- Dall'Anese, Enrico; Martorel, Paolo (1980). Il Quartier del Piave e della Val Mareno: Storie e Leggende (in Italian). Vittorio Veneto: TIPSE.
- Dall'Anese, Enrico; Martorel, Paolo (1982). El Panevin: Tradizioni Popolari del Quartier del Piave e della Val Mareno (in Italian). Pieve di Soligo: Nuova Stampa 3.
- Dall'Anese, Enrico; Martorel, Paolo (1984). Personaggi Illustri del Quartier del Piave e della Val Mareno (in Italian). Pieve di Soligo: Nuova Stampa 3.
- Dall'Anese, Enrico; Martorel, Paolo (1987). Il Quartier del Piave Nel Primo Novecento (in Italian). Pieve di Soligo: Nuova Stampa 3.
- Dall'Anese, Enrico; Martorel, Paolo (1988). Gli Anni della Grande Guerra nel Quartier del Piave (in Italian). Pieve di Soligo: Nuova Stampa 3.
- Dall'Anese, Enrico (1989). Prosecco: Assolo di Vino (in Italian). Pieve di Soligo.
- Dall'Anese, Enrico; Martorel, Paolo (1991). Il Quartier del Piave e la Valle del Soligo: Guida Storico-Artistica (in Italian). Pieve di Soligo.
- Da Lozzo, Celeste (1991). L'Attività Mineraria: Storia di Un Percorso sulla Dorsale Collinare Molinetto, San Zuanet e le Grotte Carsiche tra Refrontolo e San Pietro di Feletto (in Italian). Feltre: Nuova Stampa 3.
- Zerbi, Myriam; Esposito, Mario; Reale, Isabella, eds. (2003). Emma Ciardi: Pittrice Veneziana tra '800 e '900 (Personaggi tra Ombra e Sole) (in Italian). Treviso: Canova. ISBN 978-8884090706.
- Faldon, Nilo (1977). Rua di Feletto (in Italian). Vittorio Veneto: TIPSE.
- Bechevolo, Rino (1993). Faldon, Nilo (ed.). Diocesi di Vittorio Veneto (in Italian). Padova: Gregoriana Libreria Editrice.
- Federici, Domenico Maria (1803). Memorie Trevigiane sulle Opere di Disegno dal Mille e Cento al Mille Ottocento, per Servire alla Storia delle Belle Arti d'Italia (in Italian). Venezia: Andreola. ISBN 978-1271436477.
- Federici, F. (1966). Giocondo Protti: Un Profeta della Biologia. Clinica Europea, Attualità di Medicina (in Italian). Vol. V, N. 2. Rome.
- Carpenè, Camillo (1969). Floriani, Abramo (ed.). Ombre e Luci dal Diario Inedito di Mons. Camillo Carpenè (8 settembre 1943 - 30 Aprile 1945) (in Italian). Vittorio Veneto: TIPSE.
- Franceschi, Antonio (1878). Un Fatto dei Collalto del Secolo XVI, Ovvero Estinzione della Linea del Conte Collaltino (in Italian). Treviso.
- Molà, Luca; Mueller, Reinhold C.; Zanier, Claudio (2000). La Seta in Italia dal Medioevo al Seicento: dal Baco al Drappo. Presente Storico (in Italian). Venice: Fondazione Giorgio Cini. pp. 89-122 [La Contabilità Come Fonte: La Trattura della Seta nel Contado Trevigiano (Secolo XVII), Danilo Gasparini]. ISBN 978-8831774420.
- La Gazzetta di Treviso (18–19 July 1878). Giornale Quotidiano Liberale-Progressista (in Italian). Province of Treviso.
- Lorenzon, Pietro (2001). Il Molinetto della Croda Patrimonio della Comunità di Refrontolo, 1997-2001 (in Italian). Pieve di Soligo.
- Lorenzon, Pietro (2002). Associazione Pro Loco di Refrontolo: 1962-2002, 40 Anni di Attività (Storia, Tradizioni, Aneddoti, Curiosità) (in Italian). Pieve di Soligo.
- Mietto, Paolo; Sauro, Ugo (2000). Grotte del Veneto: Paesaggi Carsici e Grotte del Veneto (in Italian). Vago: La Grafica. ISBN 978-8898513512.
- Michelon, Bruno; Tomasi, Giovanni (2003). Gente di Tarzo (in Italian). Godega di Sant'Urbano: Dario De Bastiani Editore. ISBN 978-8884660411.
- Mies, Giorgio (1989). Santi Nell'Arte tra Piave e Livenza (in Italian). Treviso: Sinistra Piave Servizi Editore.
- Monterumici, Domenico (1870). Annuario Statistico-Amministrativo della Provincia di Treviso (in Italian). Treviso: Luigi Priuli Press.
- Monterumici, Domenico (1886). Invasione Colerica (1885-86) nella Provincia di Treviso: Studio Statistico-Amministrativo (in Italian). Treviso.
- Morgan, Ernesto (1996). Il Molinetto della Croda Racconta... Memorie di Ernesto Morgan (in Italian). Pieve di Soligo: Nuova Stampa.
- Olivieri, Dante (1914). Saggio di Una Illustrazione Generale della Toponomastica Veneta (in Italian). Città di Castello.
- Passolunghi, Pier Angelo (1985). Archivio per Susegana (in Italian). Treviso: Grafiche Marini.
- Passolunghi, Pier Angelo (1987). I Collalto: Linee, Documenti, Genealogie per Una Storia del Casato (in Italian and Latin). Treviso: B&M Edizioni.
- Passolunghi, Pier Angelo (2002). Le Contee di Collalto e di San Salvatore: Gli Statuti del 1581-83 e Altre Norme Inedite. Collana Fondazione Castello San Salvatore (in Italian). Cornuda: Castello S. Salvatore. ISBN 978-8890083402.
- Pellegrini, Giovan Battista (1987). Ricerche di Toponomastica Veneta. Rete ita di Cultura Popolare (in Italian and Venetian). Padova: CLESP.
- Perin, Giuseppe (1993). Refrontolo: Famiglie e Cognomi dal 1624 (in Italian). Vittorio Veneto.
- Perin, Giuseppe (1998). Refrontolo: Volti e Immagini del Passato (in Italian). Vittorio Veneto.
- Rizzi, Paolo (2000). Mostra Retrospettiva di Angelo Lorenzon. Catalog (in Italian). Mestrino.
- Rorato, Giampiero (2002). Il Prosecco di Conegliano-Valdobbiadene. Enoica (in Italian). Sona: Morganti Editori. ISBN 978-8887549324.
- Ruzza, Vincenzo (1992). Dizionario Biografico Vittoriese e della Sinistra Piave. Sistema Bibliotecario del Vittoriese (in Italian). Vittorio Veneto: Dario De Bastiani Editore.
- Spada, Mario (1992). Diario dell'Invasione: Refrontolo 9 Novembre 1917 - 30 Ottobre 1918 (in Italian). Vittorio Veneto.
- Titonel, Damira (2001). La Libertà Va Conquistata: Un'Emigrante Trevigiana nella Resistenza Francese (A Cura di Carmela Mantone). Nord Est (in Italian). Caselle: Cierre Edizioni. ISBN 978-8883141263.
- Tomasi, Giovanni (1983). Dizionario del Dialetto di Revine. Serie Dizionari (in Italian). Vol. II. Belluno: Istituto Bellunese di Ricerche Sociali e Culturali.
- Tomasi, Giovanni (1998). La Diocesi di Ceneda: Chiese e Uomini dalle Origini al 1586 (in Italian). Vittorio Veneto: Diocese of Vittorio Veneto.
- Varnier, P. (1994). Refrontolo nella Storia (in Italian). Vittorio Veneto.
- Verci, Giambatista B. (1979–1983). Storia della Marca Trevigiana e Veronese 1739-1795. 20 Volumes Collected in 10 Tomes (in Italian) (Anastatic Reprint (1786 Edition) ed.). Bologna: Arnaldo Forni.
- Vv.Aa. (2001). Ville Venete: la Provincia di Treviso (a Cura di Chiovaro Simonetta). Ville Venete (in Italian). Venezia: Marsilio. ISBN 978-8831777629.
- Zamboni, Alberto (1983). Le Origini del Cristianesimo tra Piave e Livenza, da Roma a Carlo Magno. L'Azione (in Italian). Vol. Toponomastica e Storia Religiosa Fino al IX Secolo [5]. Vittorio Veneto: TIPSE. pp. 45–78.
