= Annibale Brandolini =

Italian soldier, patriot and politician

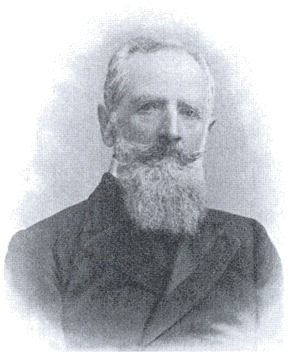
Annibale Brandolini

Annibale Francesco Vincenzo Luigi Brandolini (or Brandolin, full surname Brandolini Rota; (Cordignano, 29 September 1829 – Cordignano, 23 December 1901) was an Italian soldier, patriot and politician.

== Biography ==
Son of Girolamo Brandolini and Vendramina Grimani, he was born into an illustrious Venetian family - the Brandolini family - of remote Forlì origins and could boast the titles of Count of Valmareno (recognized with the Ministerial Decree of April 30, 1894), Lord of Solighetto and Venetian patrician. He had six brothers, including Bishop Sigismondo Brandolini Rota.

He took part in the second and third wars of independence as a cavalry officer. Between 1867 and 1872 he was Captain of the Hussars of Piacenza. As a captain, there is an episode of him killing the chief of Ciccariello gang on 16 June 1863

In politics, he was involved both locally and nationally: he was a municipal councilor in Cison di Valmarino, Cordignano and Venice, mayor of Cison di Valmarino and provincial councilor of Venice (1881–1888). Other public offices he held were that of honorary orderly officer of King Vittorio Emanuele II (1867) and King Umberto I (1886), honorary aide-de-camp of the late King Vittorio Emanuele II (1883, 1884, 1887, 1889), vice-president of the Italian Red Cross, maritime department of Venice, as well as member of the board of directors of the Agrarian Association of Treviso.

During his term as a mayor of Cison di Valmarino, he established there a social dairy, the first of its kind in the province of Treviso.

He became a senator on 17 November 1898 with Antonino Di Prampero as rapporteur. The validation of the nomination and the oath took place on 9 December of the following year.

== Personal life ==
In 1868, he married Leopolda D'Adda, the only daughter of Senator Carlo D'Adda. They settled in the Villa Brandolini Rota in Cordignano, which was subsequently renamed into Villa Brandolini d'Adda. Together they had four children, including the parliamentarians Girolamo and Brandolino.

In 1872, his spouse countess Leopolda Brandolini d'Adda was appointed the Lady of the Palace to the Princess of Piedmont in the place of Marchioness Pallavicino, resigned.

His son Girolamo Brandolini in 1898 married Gabrielle Lucchesi-Palli (1875–1937), a granddaughter of Marie-Caroline of Bourbon-Two Sicilies, Duchess of Berry.

His son Carlo Brandolini d'Adda (16 Nov 1887 – 16 Oct 1942), who later became President of the Municipal Company for Inland and Lagoon Navigation, in 1917 married in Pau José Antonia Adelaide Gaёtan Alvarez Pereira de Mella, also descending from Marie-Caroline of Bourbon-Two Sicilies, Duchess of Berry, being her great-granddaughter and the oldest daughter of the Duke of Cadaval and the Duchess of Cadaval, residing in Palazzo Zileri in Vicenza, Italy, and the sister of Antonio de Cadaval.
