= CastelBrando =

Medieval castle in Veneto, Italy

- Cison di Valmarino Italy
- CastelBrando

Site information
- Type: Castle
- Condition: Restored

Location
- Location of CastelBrando in Northern Italy
- Coordinates: 45.78°N 12.17°E

Site history
- Built: 1st century
- Materials: Dolomite Limestone

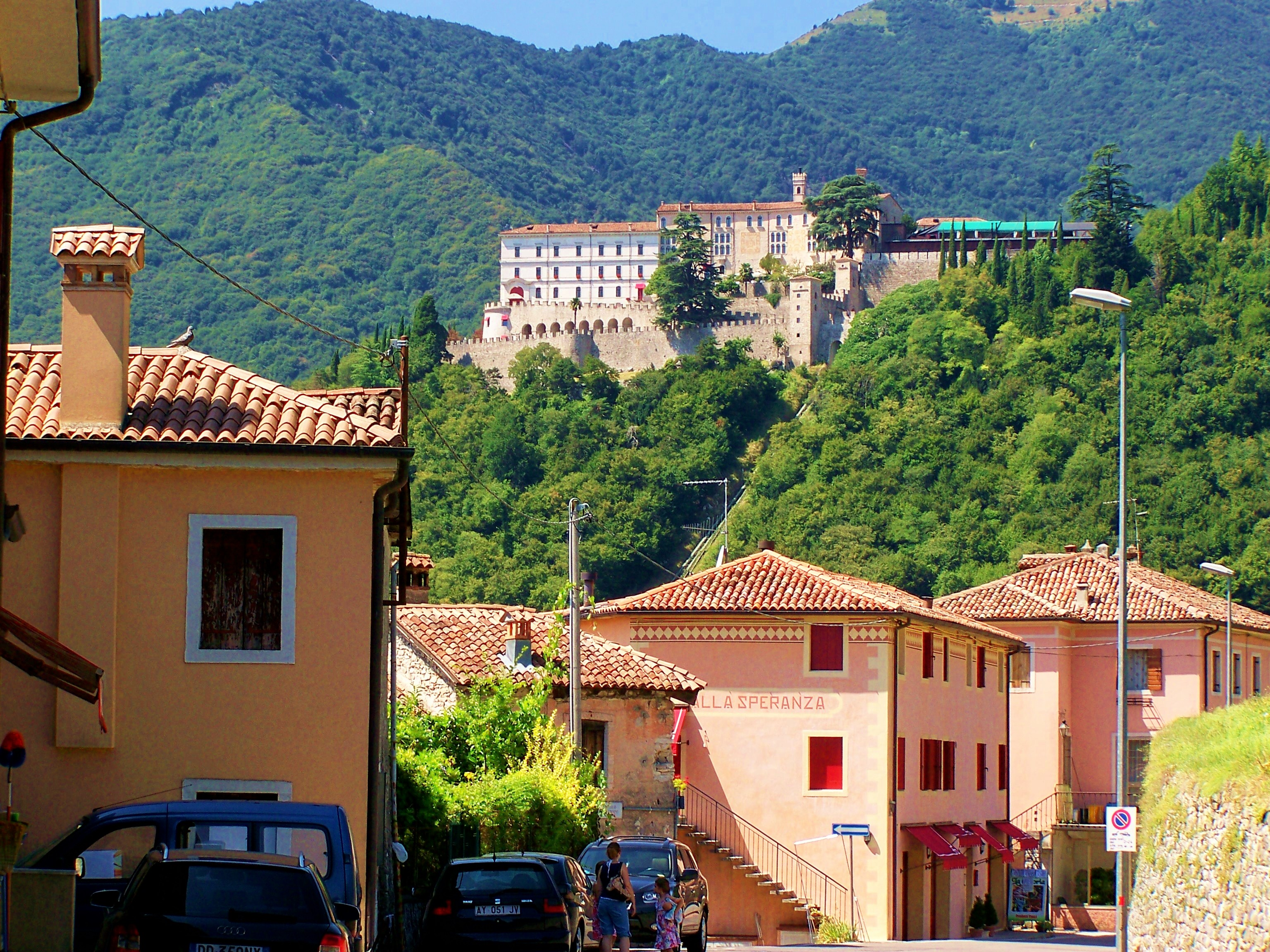
Cison di Valmarino with CastelBrando in background

CastelBrando, former Castrum Costae, is a medieval castle situated on a dolomite limestone rock at an elevation of 370 m (1,210 ft) above sea level, overlooking the villages of Cison di Valmarino and Valmareno, Northern Italy. The name CastelBrando stems from Brando I of the name Brandolini, an ancient family from Forlì, who were the Lords of the castle.

== History ==
CastelBrando was originally built in the Roman age as a defensive fortress in order to protect the important lines of communication which connected Northern Italy to the countries on the other side of the Alps. Originally there was a garrison here protecting the territory between the Piave and the Livenza rivers in order to facilitate the safe construction of the pre-alpine part of the Via Claudia Augusta, an important Roman road, which linked the valley of the Po River with Rhaetia (modern Austria). The original castrum, dating from 46 AD is still visible today. A recent archaeological excavation has uncovered a 3 m (9.8 ft) diameter bread-oven within the castrum, dating from the same period. The original Roman baths have also been excavated, as have the original pipes of the aqueduct which supplied water from three nearby natural springs. These springs still provide water for the castle today. During the European Migration Period the fortress became an important defensive position against barbarian invasions. Over the centuries the castle has been subject to numerous enlargements and renovations. During the 13th century the castle was substantially enlarged while under the ownership of the Da Camino family, who lived there from 1233 to 1335. Their architectural additions included surrounding the castle with imposing Guelph-Ghibelline style battlements and building a central tower. Gherardo III da Camino, the great Italian feudal lord and military leader was born in the castle in 1240.

The Castle's ownership then passed over to the Republic of Venice, which awarded the Castle's fiefdom first to Marin Faliero and then to the condottieri Giovanni Brandolino and Erasmo da Narni, better known as "Gattamelata". After the fall of Venetian Republic in 1797, it was passed down through the family of Giovanni Brandolino and became the property of the Brandolini Counts, an ancient family from Forlì. In the first half of the 16th century Antonio Maria Brandolini (1476–1522), commissioned skilled engineers to enlarge the central part of the castle in Sansovino style, adding Venetian Gothic double and triple mullioned windows. In 1700 the Brandolini family commissioned Ottavio Scotti, architect and Count of Treviso, to design and build an extension to the southern part of the castle. Part of these works included the building of a castle chapel, the Church of San Martino. The chapel was decorated internally with frescoes painted by Egidio Dall'Oglio (18th century).

During World War I, the castle was invaded by Imperial Austrian forces and used as a military hospital. The Brandolini family abandoned their home and escaped to their Solighetto villa near Pieve di Soligo. After 10 years of restoration work, financed by Count Girolamo IV Brandolini (1870–1935), the castle was re-opened as a place of residence in 1929. In 1959 the castle was sold by the Brandolini family to the Salesian fathers, who altered its structure to use it as a monastery and as a centre for spiritual studies. In 1997 CastelBrando was purchased by Quaternary Investments SpA, who started an expansive renovation program in order to convert it into a hotel and museum.

== Present day ==
CastelBrando has now been extensively restored and now houses a 4-star hotel, museum and a theatre. Visitors can get up to the castle by funicular railway from the village.

CastelBrando has several museum exhibits including carriages, weapons, costumes, and musical instruments.

On 18–20 April 2009 CastelBrando hosted the first ever G8 Agriculture Ministers' Meeting organised by the Italian Minister of Agriculture, Luca Zaia.

== See also ==
- List of castles in Italy

== Gallery ==
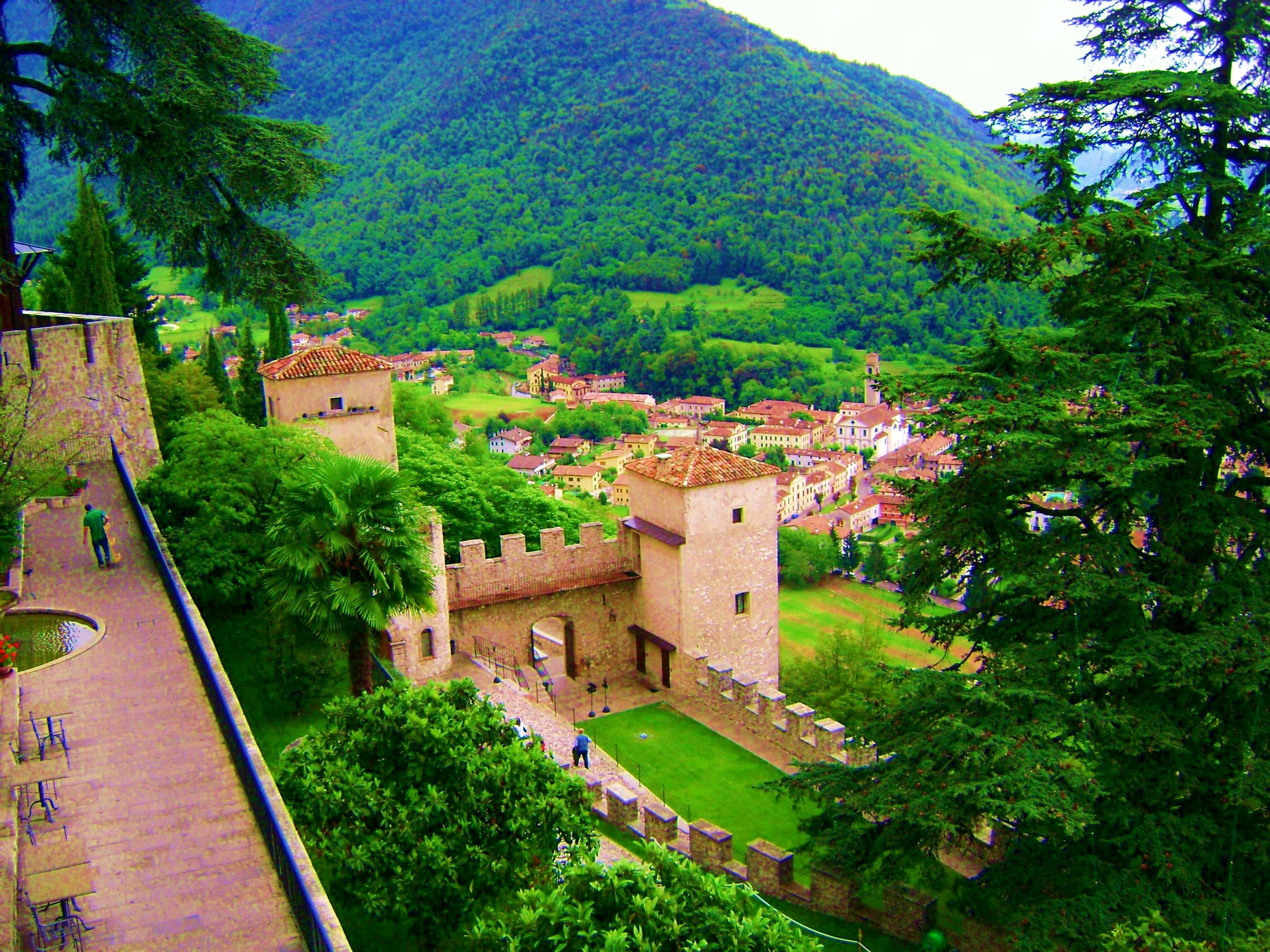
View of the battlements, in the direction of the village of Follina

CastelBrando at night

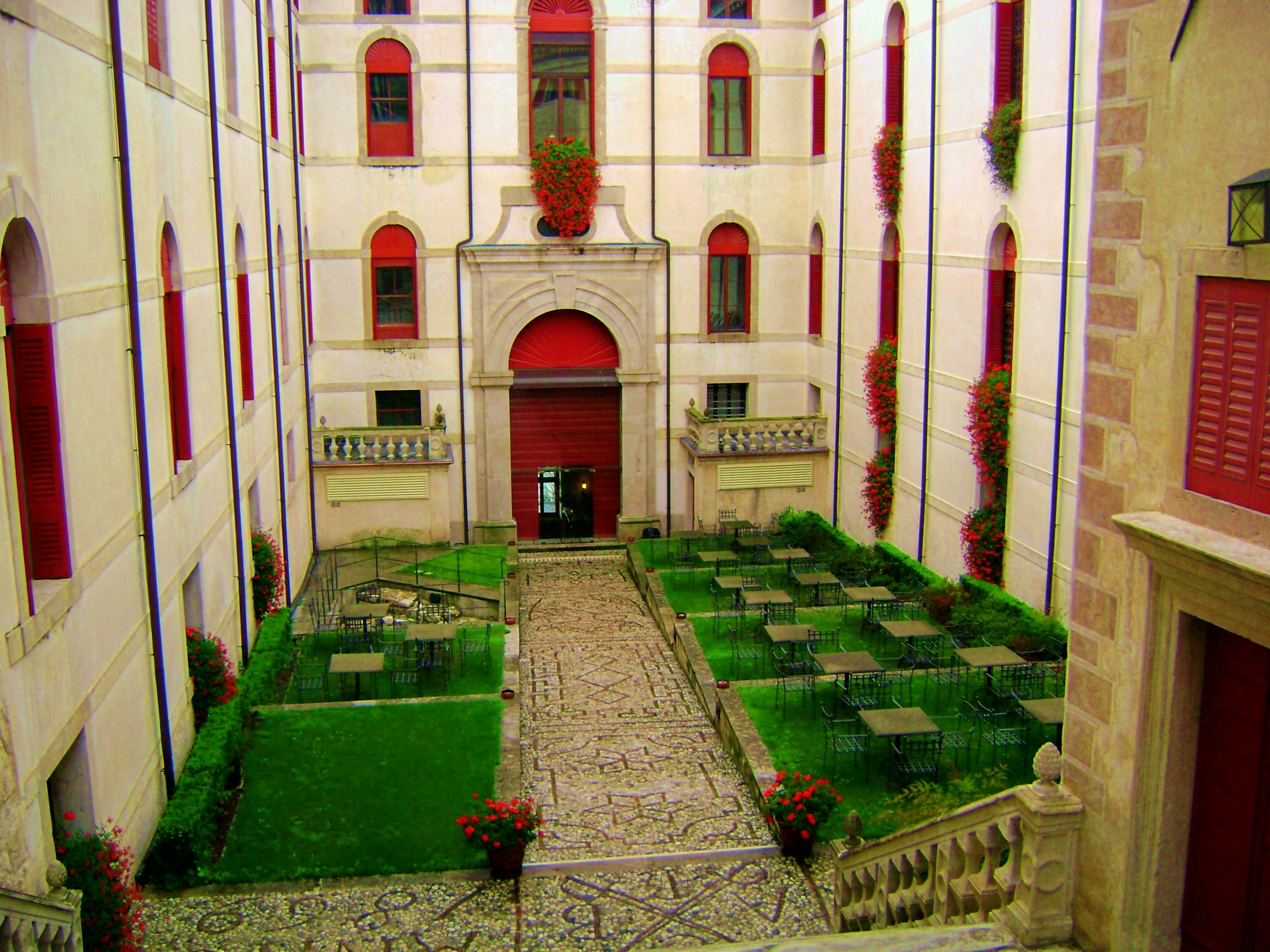
Lower inner courtyard
