= Brandolini family =

Venetian noble family

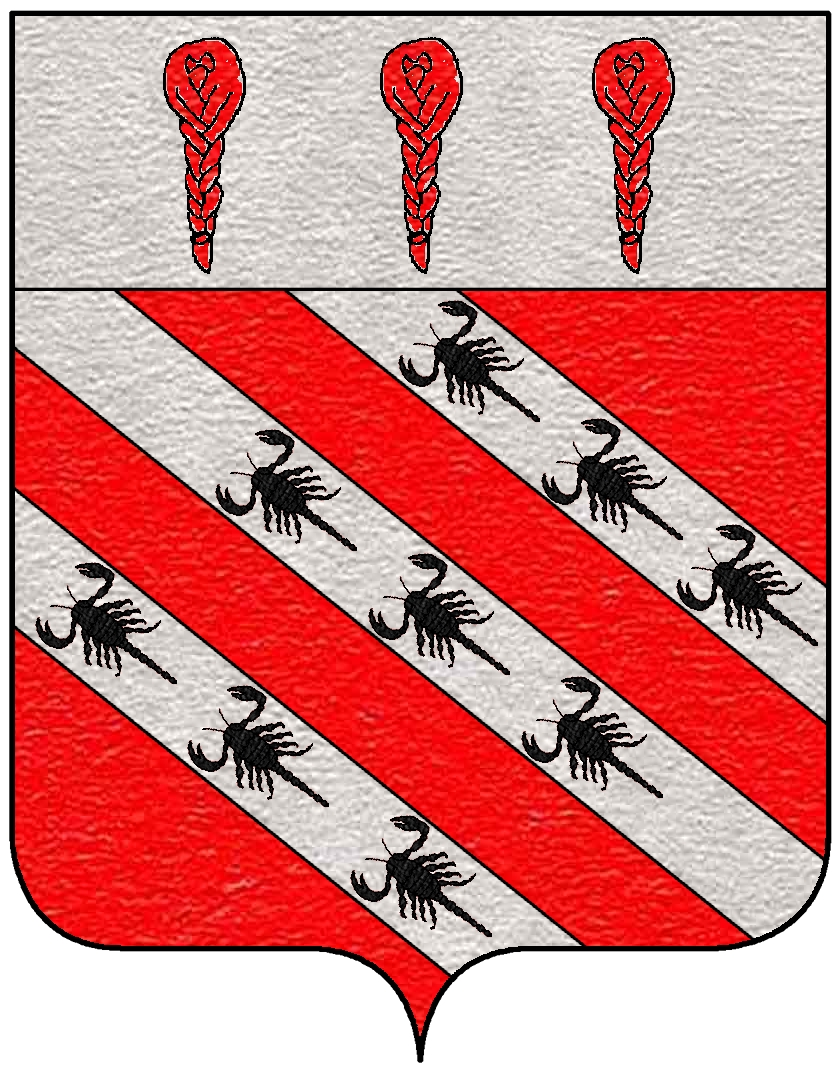
Brandolini coat of arms

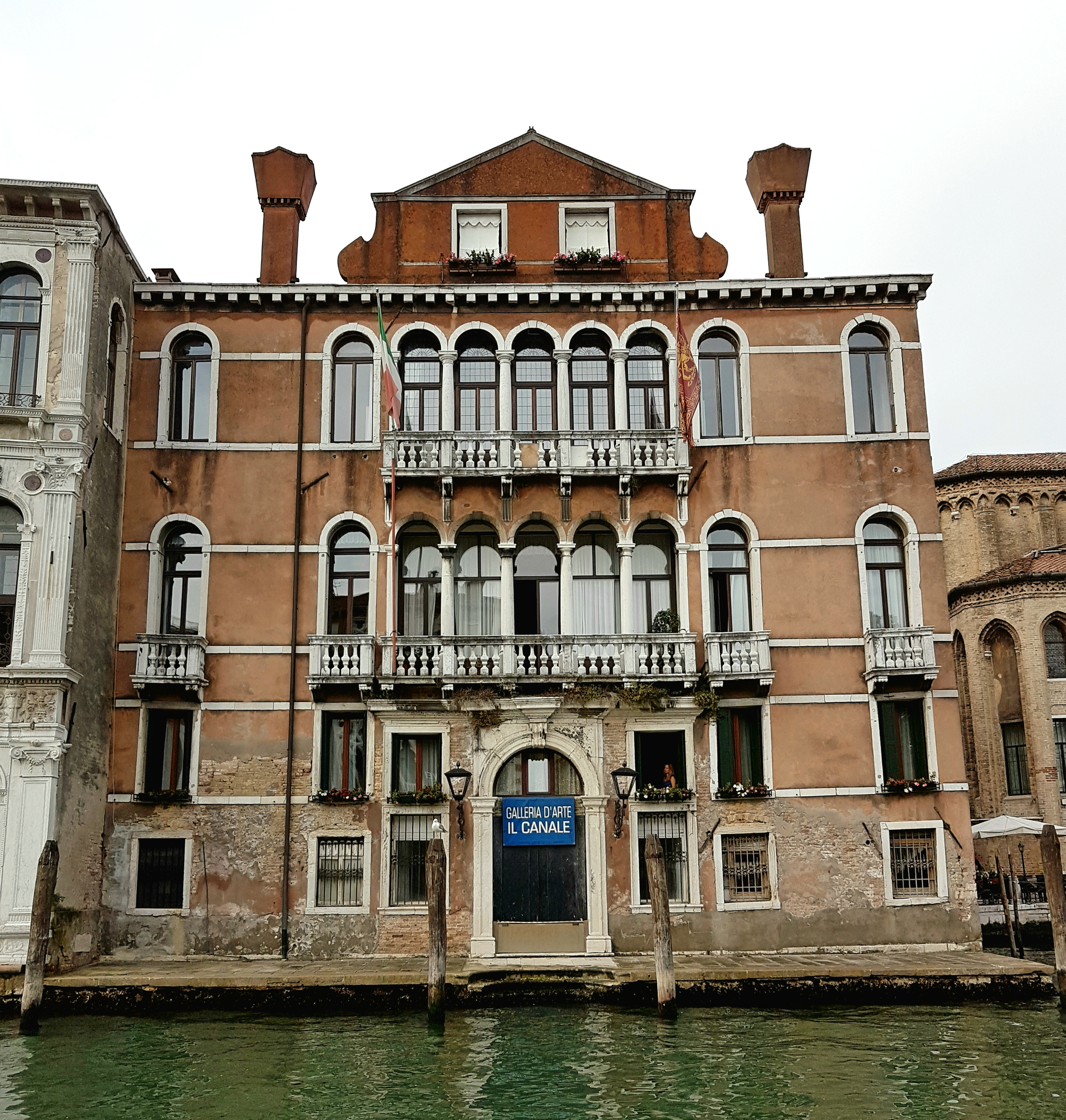
Palazzo Brandolin Rota in Venice

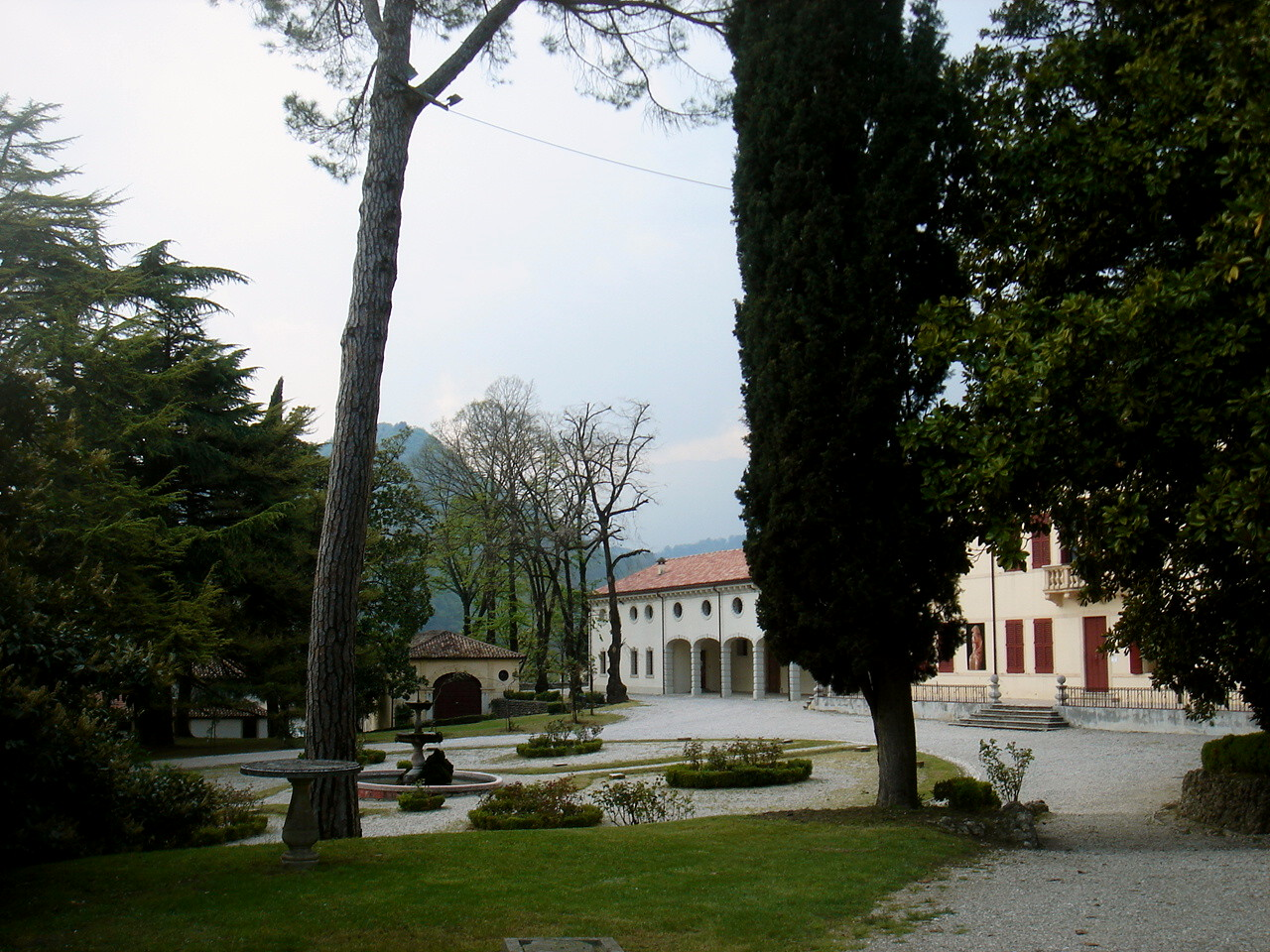
Villa Brandolini d'Adda in Solighetto

The Brandolini family (or, in Venetian language, Brandolin; earlier de Brandoli) is a noble family of ancient Forlì origins. In Forlì, the Brandolini family obtained the title of patricians, while in Bagnacavallo (in the Ravenna area), they achieved lordship. A branch, starting with Brandolino Count Brandolini, distinguished itself in Veneto as feudal lords of Valmareno under the Serenissima.

== History ==
The founder of the family is considered to have been Brando I (6th century), a figure who is in part legendary. According to the legend, the Brandolini family descended from the same lineage as the house of the Lords of Brandenburgh, when in the year 540 A.D., Brando I, an illustrious captain of cavalry, passed into Italy with Bellisario against the Goths.

The Brandolini, citizens of Forlì, distinguished themselves since the 11th century as men of arms and condottiero. Particularly noteworthy are Tiberto I, general of Otto III; Tiberto II, crusader; Sigismondo, also a crusader; Avardo II, first count of Bagnacavallo; Tiberto IV, Broglia I († 1400); Guido V (1350-1383); Brandolino III; his nephew Brandolino IV († 1456); Brandolino V; Tiberto IX († 1493); Giovanni II; Brandolino VI; Lionello II; Sigismondo II to name just a few. The Venetian branch continued to maintain its own company until the 18th century.

Other representatives belonged to the ecclesiastical class or were close to the ecclesiastical class such as a humanist and poet Raffaele Brandolini, appointed by Pope Leo X as a teacher and mentor of Marcantonio Flaminio. Raffaele was from Naples, was blind like his older brother Aurelio Brandolini and like him also nicknamed Lippo, in other words rheumy.

Among the Brandolini clerics, one of the most well-known was probably Marcantonio Brandolini (died 25 May 1616), an abbot of Nervesa, who gave name to "the Brandolini affair", which is closely related to and was one of the causes of the Venetian interdict. Brandolini was locked in a feud with his cousins and was handed over to Rome as part of the negotiations that ended the interdict.

Another cleric of the family was Monsignor Sigismondo dei conti Brandolini, bishop of Ceneda, who resided at the end of the 19th century in the residence of the bishops of Ceneda the Castle of San Martino.

The first known history of the Brandolini family was written by Andrea Chiavenna from Belluno and published in 1648 in Padua.

=== Branches of the family ===
Brandolino IV, among the most famous mercenary leaders of the time, fought in the service of the Republic of Venice. For the victories achieved, the Serenissima offered him in 1436 the lordship of Valmareno, with headquarters in the CastelBrando of Cison, to share with his comrade in arms Erasmo Stefano of Narni (better known by his nickname of Gattamelata). The latter, after falling out with Brandolino, with a public deed dated 5 December 1439 renounced his feudal rights, leaving the domains to Brandolino and his descendants alone. Still, regardless of the falling out, Gattamelata's daughter Polissena Romagnola was married to Tiberto Brandolini (1417-c1462), the son of Brandolino IV and Giovanna dei Signori della Tela. Thus the Brandolinis of today are the only known currently living descendants of the heroic Gattamelata.

==== Romagna branch ====
Tiberto VIII, having passed to the Sforza of Milan, was disinherited by his father and the title of Count of Valmareno passed to his brother Cecco II. Tiberto, however, retained the Romagna assets and the fief of Castellarquato obtained from the Sforza. This branch died out in 1782 with the death of Broglia IV who designated his heirs the Dall'Aste, a noble family from Forlì related to the Brandolini, since then referred to as the Dall'Aste Brandolini family. One of the Dall'Aste Brandolini, Angelo Dall'Aste Brandolini was nominated a vice-consul of Italy in Algeria in 1898.

==== Venetian branch ====
Descendants of Cecco II, the Venetian branch obtained the Venetian patriciate in 1686 because Guido VIII, unable to participate in the war of Morea against the Turks, neither he, ill, nor his sons, too young, sent a large sum of money to the army. In 1750 they also added, for testamentary reasons, the surname Rota.

In 1914 the descendants of the senator Annibale Brandolin and Leopolda D'Adda, sole heir of her father Carlo D'Adda, were authorized to change their surname to Brandolini D'Adda. Bishop Sigismondo and the politicians Annibale, Girolamo and Brandolino are from this period.

Among the recent Brandolinis, we should remember Brando (1918-2005), husband of Cristiana Agnelli, sister of the more famous Gianni and Umberto, and his niece Bianca (born 25 June 1987), third cousin of Lapo Elkann, to whom she was romantically linked.

Brando and Cristiana had 4 sons: Brandino Brandolini d’Adda (born 3 July 1957), who was married to Marie Brandolini d'Adda di Valmareno, née Angliviel de la Beaumelle (7 April 1963 – 30 May 2013), the daughter of Beatrice de Rothschild and the stepdaughter of Pierre Rosenberg; Tiberto Ruy Brandolini d’Adda, who married Georgina Maria Natividad de Faucigny-Lucinge et Coligny; Leonello Brandolini d’Adda; and Nuno Carlo Brandolini d'Adda (born 31 May 1950), who married Muriel Brandolini d'Adda di Valmareno, née Phan van Thiet.

The Brandolinis of Valmareno resided for centuries in CastelBrando of Cison until the 1950s, when it was sold to the Salesian Fathers. In 1997, Massimo Colomban acquired the structure, restoring it and transforming it into a luxury hotel.

The Brandolini d'Adda currently own several historic properties, including a property in Vistorta, a village in the region of Friuli Venezia Giulia. The farm in Vistorta was created in 1872 by count Guido Brandolini. The modern history of the property, however, started in the 1960s, when Brando and Cristiana decided to live at the estate after getting married and renewed the villa and the garden by collaborating with the English garden architect Russel Page and Italian interior decorator Renzo Mongiardino. “I tried to capture the atmosphere of a country house in a story by Turgenev,” Brando told Vogue in 1972. “We just started to buy things, to paint things,” recalls Cristiana. “[Renzo] didn't like anything new—everything had to be old.

Count Annibale Brandolini d’Adda and his wife contessa Ghislaine Brandolini d’Adda own Villa Casagrande, a 15th-century residence in Cison di Valmareno, Brandolini's ancestral piles. They host residential cookery courses at the villa.

==== Florentine branch ====
A Florentine branch was formed in the year 1000 and died out in 1732 with Maria Girolama.

The Brandolini d'Adda who are currently residing in Florence are also the descendants of the Venetian branch. These are Girolamo and Simonetta Brandolini d'Adda and their descendants. In 1982, they founded The Best in Italy, a high-end luxury holiday business, which at the time was the first of its kind. Simonetta Brandolini d'Adda is the founder and the President of the Friends of Florence Foundation.

== Coat of arms ==
During the first crusade, Sigismondo Brandolini from Forlì defeated an "Arab" in a famous duel: in memory of the glorious feat of arms, he decided to "steal from him the enterprise of the scorpions", animals that would in fact later appear in the family coat of arms. The white and red colors of the background, moreover, are reminiscent both of the colors of the crusader symbols and those of the cities of origin, Forlì and Bagnacavallo.

According to Giovanni Eroli, the braids on the coat of arms are the braids of Gattamelata, the famous captain of Narni, as a token of his friendship with his sworn brother Brandolino Brandolini.

The motto of the Brandolini family, which can be seen on some versions of the coat of arms is “Impavidum ferient (ruinae)”, Quintus Horatius Flaccus (65 BC-8 BC), Carmina, III, 3,7. It is said that "here the Roman poet, master of stylistic elegance and gifted with unusual irony, described a man of character, upright and remaining fearless, attached to his duty and his opinions, even if the whole world is falling apart around him".
