= Girolamo Brandolini =

Italian soldier and politician (1870–1935)

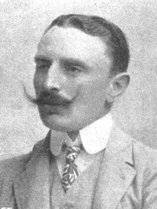
Girolamo Brandolini

Girolamo Brandolini or Brandolin, full surname Brandolini Rota, from 1914 Brandolini d'Adda (Milan, 16 May 1870 – Padua, 30 April 1935) was an Italian soldier and politician.

== Biography ==
Son of Senator Annibale Brandolini, he was the member of the Brandolini family of Venetian descent and possessed the titles of Count of Valmareno, Lord of Solighetto and Venetian patrician. With the Royal Decree of 26 November 1914 he was able to add the surname of his mother, Leopolda D'Adda, to his own.

As a local administrator, he was mayor of Cison di Valmarino (28 July 1907 – 28 June 1914) and then municipal councilor in Venice, Cison di Valmarino, Pieve di Soligo, Follina and Casatisma. He also held the office of deputy, being elected for three consecutive legislatures (elections of 1901, 1904 and 1909).

He became senator on 16 October 1913 with Antonino Di Prampero as rapporteur. The appointment was validated on 5 December and he was sworn in on the following 9 December.

As for his military career, between 1890 and 1892, Brandolini took part in the Eritrean war, then fought as a volunteer in the Great War. He reached the rank of lieutenant colonel of the grenadiers.

He joined fascism, enrolling in the PNF on 4 December 1925.

== Personal life ==
On 20 February 1898 in the chapel of Ca' Vendramin Calergi, Girolamo Brandolini married Gabrielle Lucchesi-Palli (1875–1937), the daughter of Hector Adinolfo Lucchesi-Palli, 9th Duke della Grazia, Prince of Campofranco (10 March 1840 – Brunsee, Styria, Austria, 4 February 1911), son of Marie-Caroline of Bourbon-Two Sicilies, Duchess of Berry, and his wife, Lucrezia Nicoletta, née Sasso-Ruffo dei principi di Sant' Antimo. They had 4 children: Annibale, Maria (born 1900), Giovanni (born 1901) and Vendramina (born 1902) Brandolini d’Adda.

On 10 June 1925, his son Annibale Brandolini d'Adda married Laura Boncompagni Ludovisi of the House of Boncompagni, the daughter of Francesco Boncompagni Ludovisi, prince of Piombino and of princess Nicoletta, née Prinetti Castelletti. One of the witnesses at the wedding was Benito Mussolini.

On 3 March 1924, his daughter Maria Concetta married Giovanni Battista Serra dei Duchi di Cassone (born 21 October 1891). They had 2 children:

- Gabriela Serra dei Duchi di Cassone (born 18 Dec 1924) and
- Marie Jose Serra dei Duchi di Cassone (born 2 Oct 1934).

In 1925, his daughter Vendramina married count Andreamaria Marcello of the Marcello family.
