= Pieve di Soligo =

- Comune
- Comune di Pieve di Soligo
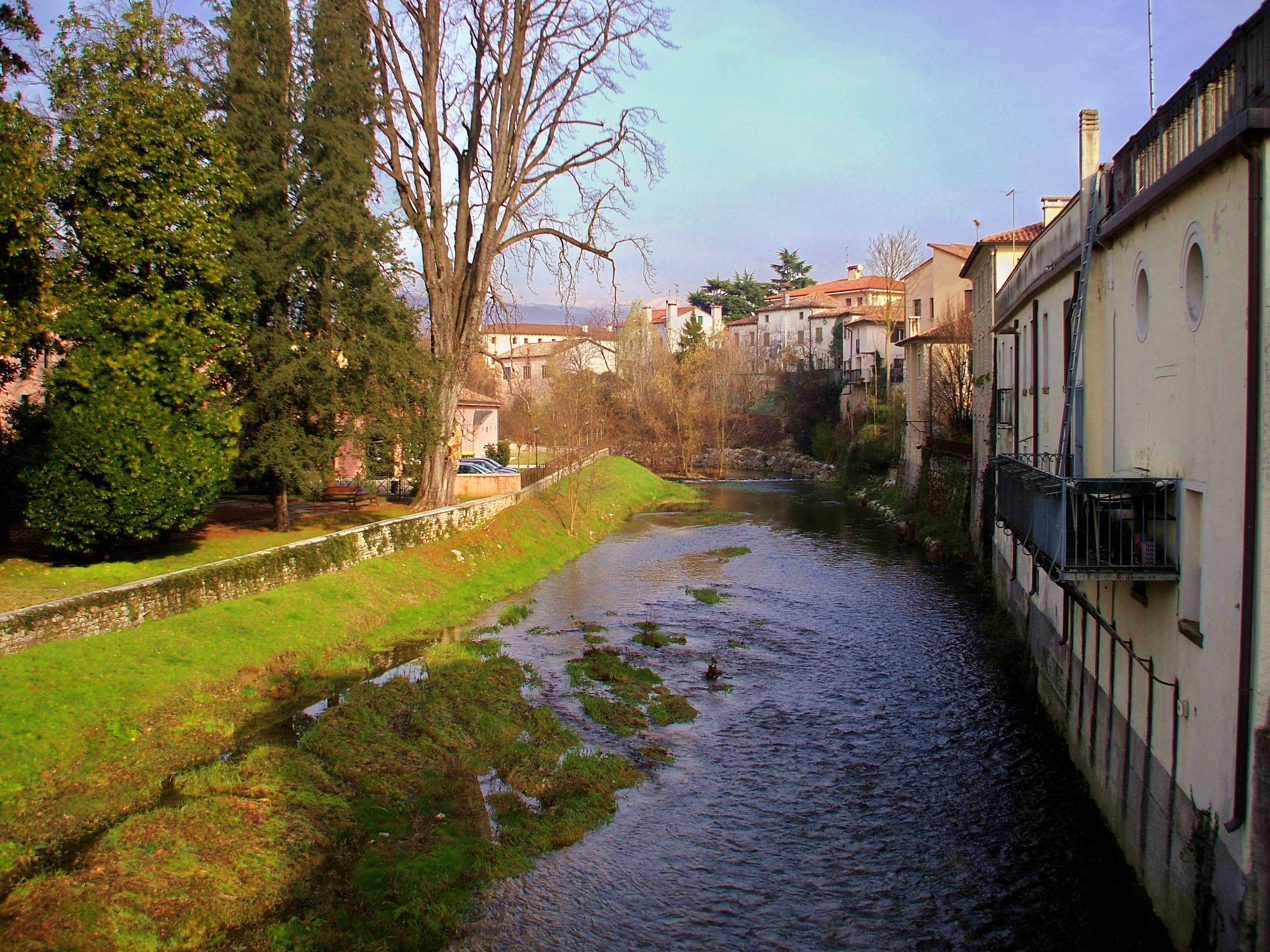
- The Soligo river flows through the centre of Pieve di Soligo.

- Coat of arms

- Location of Pieve di Soligo in Italy Pieve di Soligo (Veneto)
- Coordinates: 45°53′N 12°10′E
- Country: Italy
- Region: Veneto
- Province: Treviso (TV)
- Frazioni: Barbisano, Solighetto

Government
  - Mayor: Gigi Rock

Area
  - Total: 19 km^{2} (7.3 sq mi)
- Elevation: 132 m (433 ft)

Population (30 June 2023)
  - Total: 11,544
  - Density: 610/km^{2} (1,600/sq mi)
- Demonym: Pievigini
- Time zone: UTC+1 (CET)
  - Summer (DST): UTC+2 (CEST)
- Postal code: 31053
- Dialing code: 0438
- ISTAT code: 026057
- Patron saint: St. Mary Magdalene
- Saint day: 22 July
- Website: Official website

Pieve di Soligo is a town in the province of Treviso, near the border with the province of Belluno in Veneto, Italy. As of 2023, it had 11,544 inhabitants. "Pieve" means "Parish church".

Pieve di Soligo borders with the following municipalities: Cison di Valmarino, Farra di Soligo, Follina, Refrontolo, Sernaglia della Battaglia, and Susegana.

== Physical geography ==
The territory is 2/3 flat and 1/3 hilly, watered by rivers Soligo and Lierza. Pieve di Soligo is located in the eastern part of the Quartier del Piave, of which it has historically been the capital. The hill of San Gallo, which overlooks the village of Farra di Soligo, ideally closes the plain of Pieve to the north, together with the hills that dominate Solighetto; to the south are the hills of Collalto and Colfosco of Susegana. The arch of the Belluno Prealps, with its peaks (the most important are those of Monte Cesen and Col de Moi), frames the plain and hills of Pieve to the north; this mountainfront can be crossed through the passes of Passo San Boldo and Passo di Praderadego.

== Monuments and places of interest ==
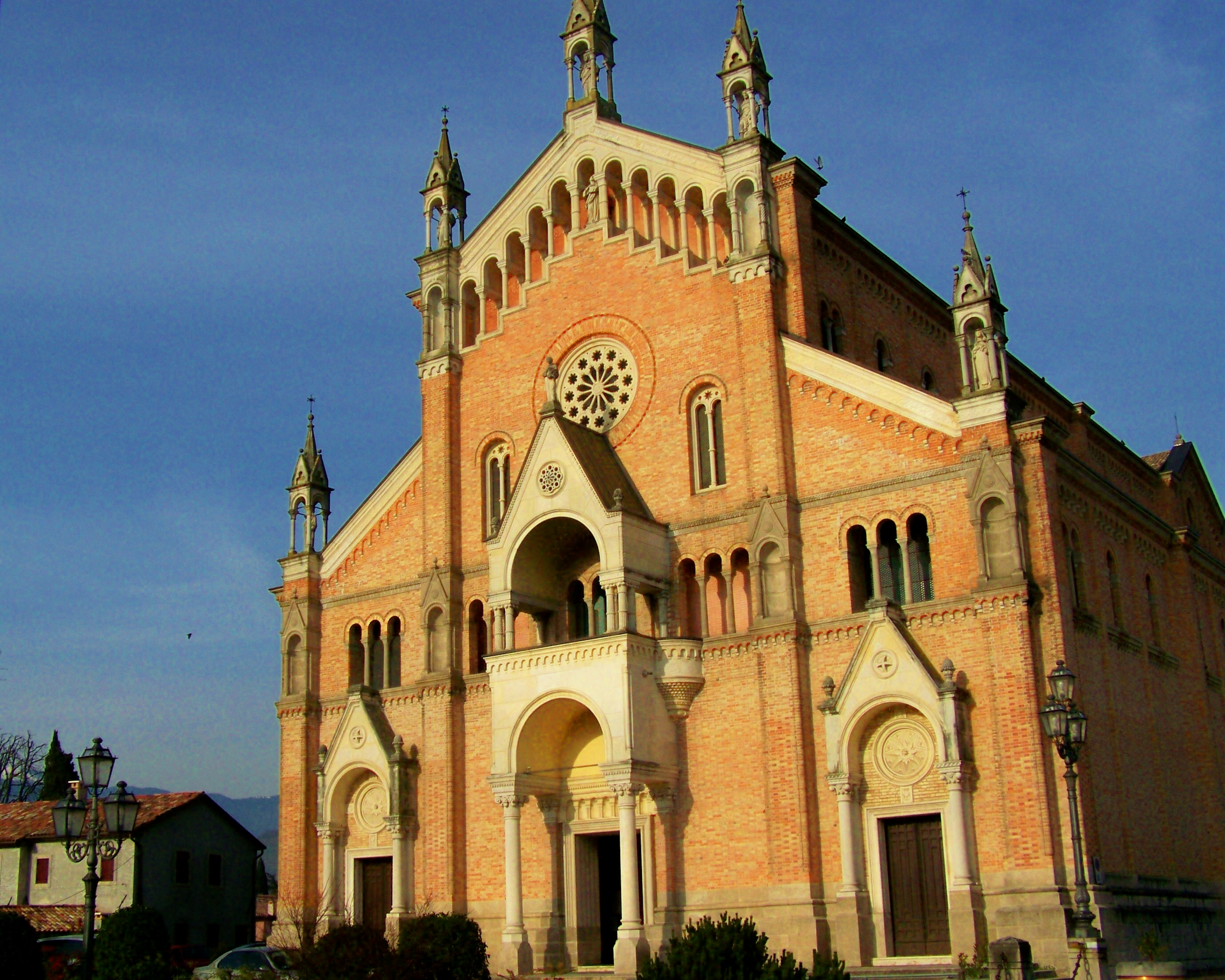
Church of the Holy Assumption in Pieve di Soligo

=== Religious architecture ===
- Cathedral of Santa Maria Assunta in Pieve di Soligo

An imposing building in the heart of Pieve is the cathedral dedicated to Santa Maria Assunta, a neo-Romanesque monument (with some neo-Gothic elements) built in the early twentieth century, by the architect Domenico Rupolo. It was consecrated in 1924. The salient façade, made of brick, is surmounted by five pinnacles and gives an idea of the three-nave structure of the interiors. The most valuable work of art kept in it is the altarpiece by the early-sixteenth-century painter Francesco da Milano, representing the Assumption of the Virgin and dating back to 1540. To the left of the cathedral stands the tall bell tower, inaugurated in 1955. It rises about 70 m and contains a powerful concert of 3 bells on a diatonic scale of Reb3 major, cast by the Premiata Fonderia De Poli of Vittorio Veneto (TV). Giuseppe Toniolo (1845 – 1918), a great Catholic sociologist and economist, was buried in the religious structure.

=== Civil architectures ===
- Villages and calli

Some old villages and their streets remain to bear witness to the original settlements of Pieve di Soligo, until the first decades of the twentieth century. Around them, the largest urban area that exists today has developed.

- Parco Vela

On April 17, 2024, a true museum piece was placed at the "Parco Vela: the Fiat G91 aircraft of the Italian Aerobatic Team, piloted by Capt. Fabio Brovedani until the withdrawal of the vehicle in 1981. The event was preceded at the "Battistella Moccia" Auditorium by the official ceremony for the conferral of Honorary Citizenship to the "313th Aerobatic Training Group – National Aerobatic Team".....

- Venetian Villas

The municipal territory of Pieve di Soligo is affected by numerous examples of Venetian palaces and villas, many of which have been catalogued by the Regional Institute of Venetian Villas.

=== Natural areas ===
The Soligo at the height of the centre of Pieve Despite the vast urbanization that affected Pieve di Soligo in the second half of the twentieth century, with residential and industrial areas growing, on the edge of the densely built-up areas there are others of environmental value, on which those affected by the course of the two rivers Lierza and Soligo stand out.

== Demographic evolution ==
Historical population

Year	Pop.	±%
1861	?	—
1871	3,790	—
1881	3,941	+4.0%
1901	4,199	+6.5%
1911	5,021	+19.6%
1921	5,779	+15.1%

Year	Pop.	±%
1931	5,856	+1.3%
1936	5,714	−2.4%
1951	6,777	+18.6%
1961	6,366	−6.1%
1971	8,173	+28.4%
1981	9,140	+11.8%

Year	Pop.	±%
1991	9,393	+2.8%
2001	10,673	+13.6%
2011	12,057	+13.0%
2021	11,680	−3.1%

Source: Data from ISTAT

=== Foreign ethnicities and minorities ===
As of 31 December 2022, foreign residents in the municipality were 1,422, i.e. 12.3% of the population. The largest groups are shown below:

1. North Macedonia 342
2. Bangladesh 264
3. Romania 179
4. Morocco 145
5. Albania 97
6. Senegal 57
7. Ukraine 49

== Culture ==
=== Instruction ===
In the municipality, there are numerous pre-school, primary and secondary schools. The secondary schools of some relevance for the city are:

- ISISS Marco Casagrande Specializations: Scientific and Human Sciences High Schools - Technical Institute for Construction, Environment and Territory.

In 1995 a name was adopted for the new Institute by the sculptor Marco Casagrande born in Miane, who lived in the nineteenth century and became famous in Hungary, which brings to mind one of the many artists and intellectuals who flourished in this land.

=== Folklore ===
The Soligo river divides the main town into two districts called "Contà" and "Trevisan". There is a great rivalry between the two districts, so much so that on the occasion of the village festival called "Lo Spiedo Gigante", which in October 2006 celebrated its 50th anniversary, there is also the tug-of-war that was once held on the bridge over the Soligo.

=== Patron ===
The patron saint of Pieve di Soligo is Santa Maria Maddalena. The patron saint's feast is on 22 July and a mass is celebrated at the church of Santa Maria Maddalena.

== Anthropogenic geography ==
=== Fractions ===
- Barbisano: inhabited by about 2100 people, the village has a non-ancient church dedicated to Saint Catherine, the patron saint, who is celebrated on 25 November.
- Solighetto: a village of about 2600 inhabitants, which covers an area almost equal to the capital of the municipality, it still preserves intact the spirit of a town based on a rural economy, at the foot of the hills of the Treviso pre-Alps. On the occasion of the feast of the Immaculate Conception (8 December), it is traditional to hold the village festival, which, after years of oblivion, since [ ], thanks to the will of an association operating in the area, has been restored.

== Notable people ==
- Antonio Bellucci (Pieve di Soligo, 1654 – Pieve di Soligo, 1726), painter.
- Marco Casagrande (Miane, 1804 – Cison di Valmarino, 1880), sculptor.
- Fausto Braga (Lozzo Atestino, 1864 – Pieve di Soligo, 1932), puppeteer.
- Toti Dal Monte (Mogliano Veneto, 27 June 1893 – Pieve di Soligo, 26 January 1975), soprano
- Sabrina Donadel (Pieve di Soligo, 15 June 1970), journalist.
- Francesco Fabbri (Pieve di Soligo, 15 August 1921 – 20 January 1977), politician.
- Angela Daiana Langone (Rome, January 1977), academic.
- Silvio Padoin (Pieve di Soligo, 11 April 1930), bishop.
- Emilia Salvioni (Bologna, 2 April 1895 – Bologna, 4 June 1968), writer.
- Giuseppe Toniolo (Treviso, 6 March 1845 – Pisa, 7 October 1918), economist.
- Andrea Zanzotto (Pieve di Soligo, 10 October 1921 – 18 October 2011), poet.
