= Farra di Soligo =

- Comune
- Comune di Farra di Soligo
- Coat of arms

- Location within Italy Location within Veneto
- Coordinates: 45°53′N 12°7′E
- Country: Italy
- Region: Veneto
- Province: Treviso (TV)
- Frazioni: Soligo, Col San Martino

Government
  - Mayor: Mattia Perencin

Area
  - Total: 28.34 km^{2} (10.94 sq mi)
- Elevation: 163 m (535 ft)

Population (30 June 2023)
  - Total: 8,482
  - Density: 299.3/km^{2} (775.2/sq mi)
- Demonym: Farresi
- Time zone: UTC+1 (CET)
  - Summer (DST): UTC+2 (CEST)
- Postal code: 31010
- Dialing code: 0438
- Website: Official website

Farra di Soligo is a comune (municipality) in the Province of Treviso in the Italian region Veneto, located about 50 kilometres (31 miles) northwest of Venice and about 25 km (16 mi) northwest of Treviso and borders the following municipalities: Follina, Miane, Moriago della Battaglia, Pieve di Soligo, Sernaglia della Battaglia, Valdobbiadene, Vidor.

== Physical geography ==
The territory of the municipality is bordered to the north by a chain of hills, at the foot of which are the inhabited centers, in an area that becomes flat and that to the east is lapped by the Soligo river. The village develops along the provincial road SP32, the Conegliano-Valdobbiadene D.O.C.G. road. In particular, in Farra di Soligo the hills, with an east-west direction, are cut in a north-south direction by torrential streams, forming 5 valleys, with unique characteristics.

== History ==
Farra was probably built in the Lombard era. In the ninth century it was part of the March of Treviso and in the following century it entered the territory of the Episcopal County of Ceneda. In the thirteenth century it was given as a fief to the Da Camino family, from whom it passed in 1321 to the Counts of Collalto, who in turn ceded it to Venice in 1337. Until 1422, the Da Camino family of the Ceneda di Sotto branch tried to oppose Venice and retake Farra.

== Monuments and places of interest ==
=== Religious architecture ===
- Church of San Vigilio

Located in Col San Martino, it was built around 1100 on the top of a hill, perhaps in place of a previous castle, from where it dominates the valley. It is best remembered for the characteristic large clocks placed on two sides of the low and sturdy Romanesque bell tower. The church has a gabled façade and the interior, with a nave covered by wooden trusses, preserves frescoes of the fifteenth century, attributed to the painter Giovanni di Francia.

- Church of St. Gall Main article: Hermitage of St. Gallen The parish church of Farra, dedicated to St. Stephen, was built in the twentieth century. Inside there are valuable works including the altarpiece by Francesco da Milano.

== Economy ==
- Prosecco Wine

Wine production is widespread, constituting the cornerstone of the municipality's agricultural sector, counted among those of the Prosecco Superiore di Conegliano-Valdobbiadene DOCG District.

- Industry

As in many areas of the north-east, the municipality of Farra is also affected by the presence of small manufacturing companies, which, in the area bordering Pieve di Soligo, specialize in the production of furniture.

== Anthropogenic geography ==
=== Fractions ===
- Col San Martino: A hamlet of about 3,000 inhabitants, Col San Martino develops to the west of the municipal center, renowned for its wine exhibition.
- Soligo: A hamlet that links its name to the river of the same name. Renowned for the goblets of stars event from top to bottom.

== Demographic evolution ==
Historical population

Year	Pop.	±%
1861	?	—
1871	4,150	—
1881	4,502	+8.5%
1901	5,281	+17.3%
1911	6,167	+16.8%
1921	6,514	+5.6%

Year	Pop.	±%
1931	6,903	+6.0%
1936	6,540	−5.3%
1951	6,777	+3.6%
1961	6,329	−6.6%
1971	6,542	+3.4%
1981	7,080	+8.2%

Year	Pop.	±%
1991	7,495	+5.9%
2001	7,893	+5.3%
2011	8,967	+13.6%
2021	8,508	−5.1%

Source: Data from ISTAT

=== Foreign ethnicities and minorities ===
As of December 31, 2022, foreigners residents in the municipality were 802, i.e. 9.4% of the population. The largest groups are shown below:

1. Morocco 208
2. North Macedonia 143
3. Romania 81
4. Bangladesh 79
5. Senegal 48
6. Ukraine 43
7. Albania 23
