= Solighetto =

Hamlet in Treviso, Italy

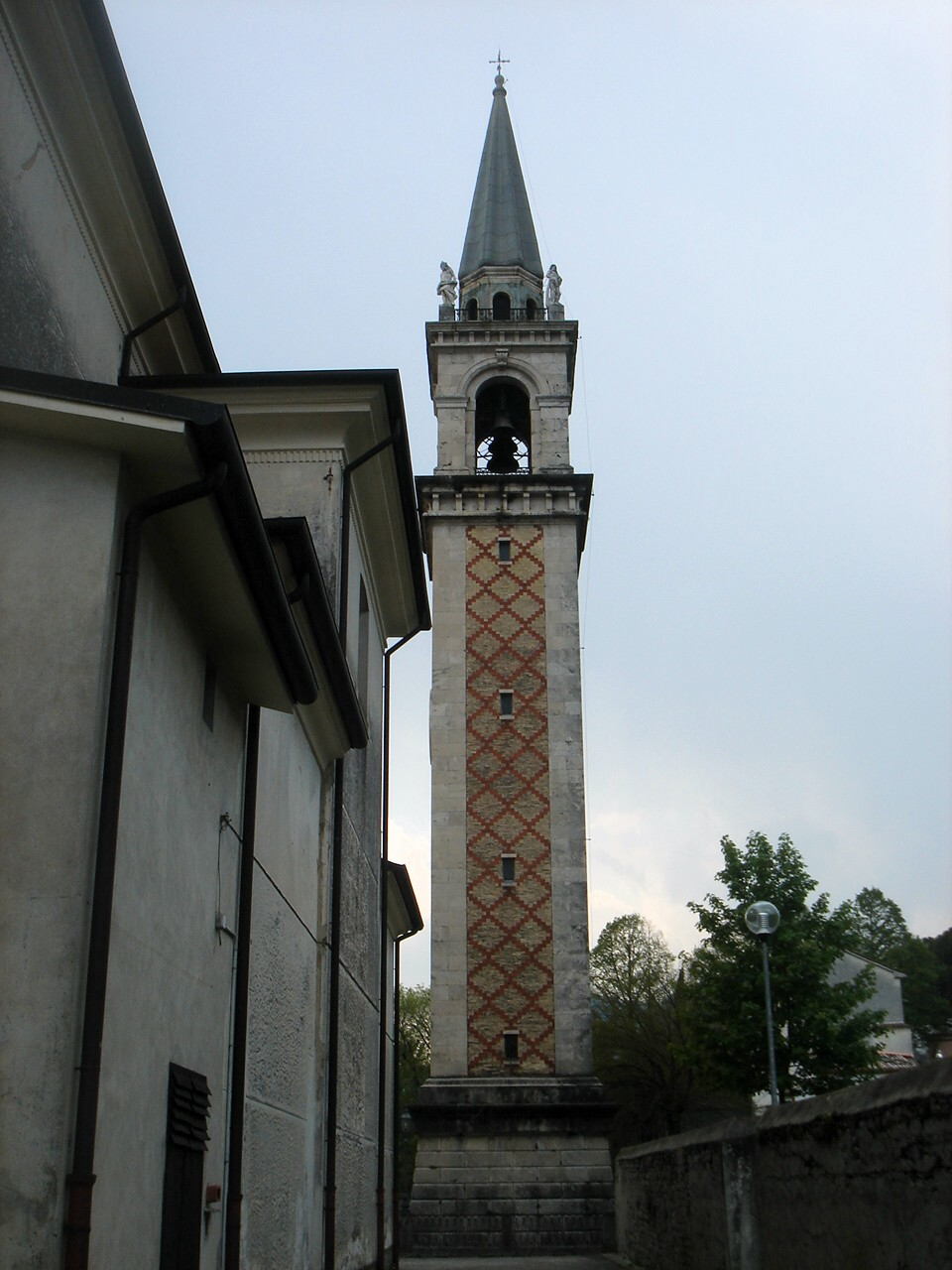
Bell tower

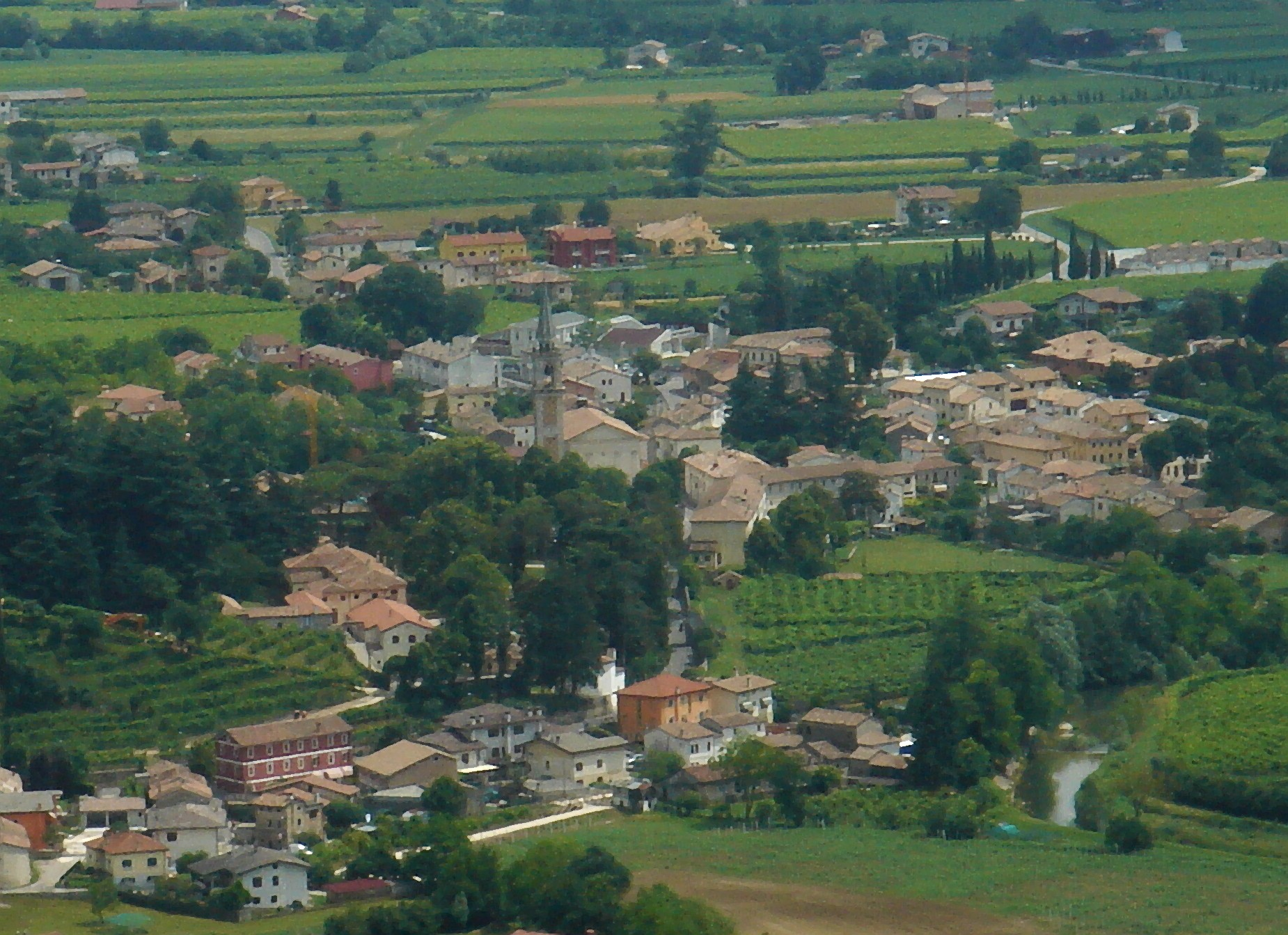
Panorama of the city

Solighetto (Suighet in Venetian) is a hamlet of the municipality of Pieve di Soligo, in the province of Treviso.

== Monuments and places of interest ==
A town gathered around the old core of Piazza Libertà and crossed by the Soligo river, Solighetto boasts some places of historical and landscape interest worthy of note.

=== The parish church ===
The parish church of Solighetto is a 19th-century building (built in 1858) commissioned by Girolamo Brandolini, the grandfather of Girolamo Brandolini d'Adda and consecrated to the Immaculate Conception, built on the site of a pre-existing church dedicated to Sant'Andrea.

The gabled façade is in neoclassical style, with a large, serrated tympanum resting on a thick architrave, from which four long Corinthian pilasters depart; you reach the entrance, consisting of a rectangular portal, through a staircase connected to the square, where, in addition to a tall bell tower, there is a fountain.

The interior of the church is worth mentioning for a work by Giovanni De Min, proclamation of the dogma of the Immaculate Conception, placed on the ceiling of the single nave.

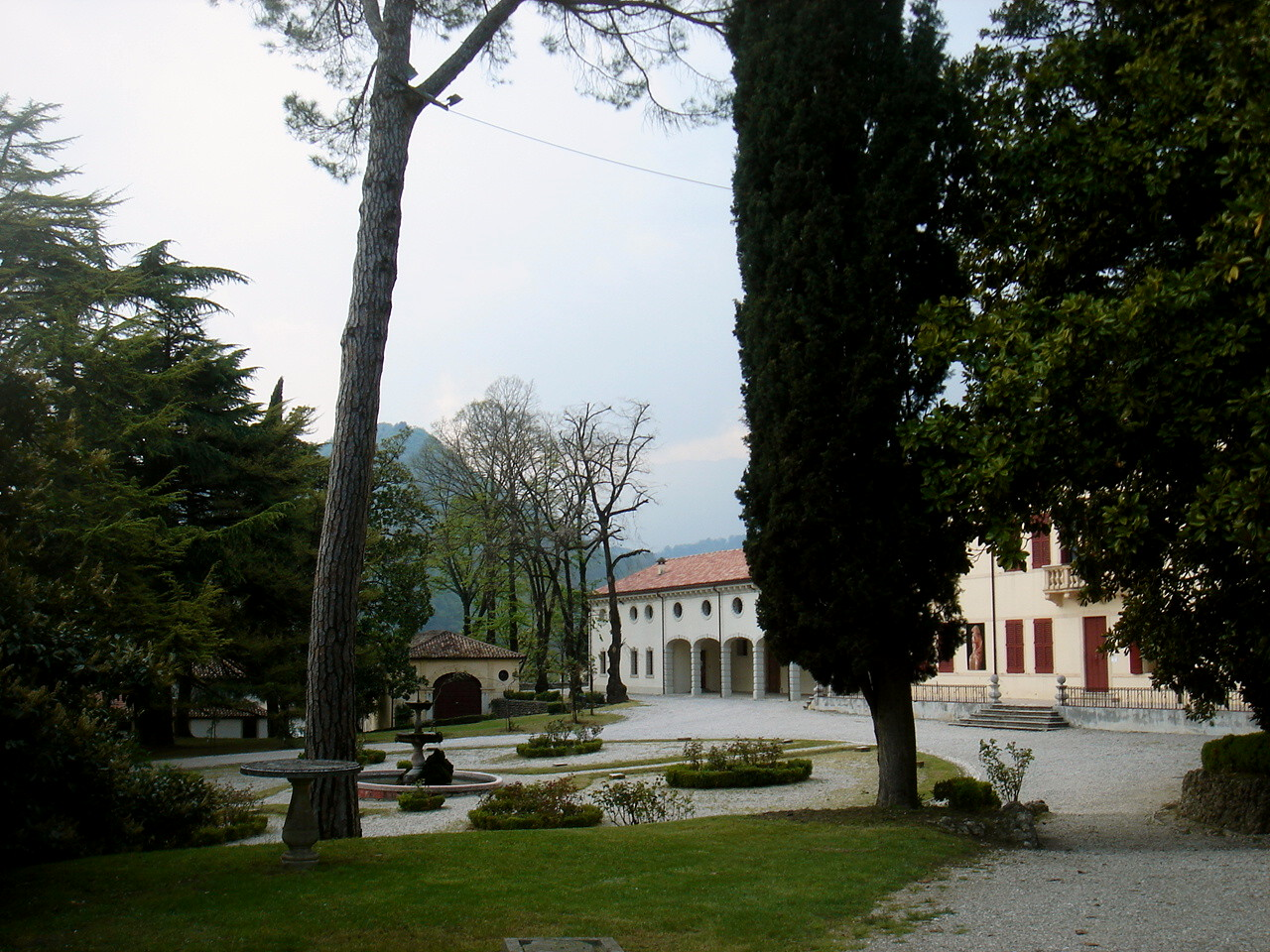
Villa Brandolini d'Adda

=== Villa Brandolini d'Adda ===
In addition to the church, the historic centre is marked by another piece of architecture of great importance: it is an 18th century Venetian villa called Villa Brandolini d'Adda, surrounded by a large garden, currently an important cultural centre of the town. The Brandolinis historically were the counts of Solighetto. For example, count Brandolino Brandolini, who owned the land here in 1650 had a title of count of Valmareno and of Castaldia di Solighetto (conte di Valmareno & della Castaldia di Solighetto).

=== Salomon Garden ===
The Salomon Garden is a park in Solighetto, once an open-air museum of sculptures by Toni Benetton, born from an initiative promoted by some great Venetian intellectuals in the 20th century.

== Economy ==
The economy of Solighetto is inextricably linked to agriculture, as this area is mostly cultivated with vineyards, being part of an area famous for the production of Prosecco wine. It is also home to the Consortium for the protection of Prosecco D.O.C.G. Consequently, there is no lack of agritourism activities.

However, in the second half of the twentieth century, some industrial activities also developed on the outskirts of the town.
