= Cison di Valmarino =

- Comune
- Comune di Cison di Valmarino
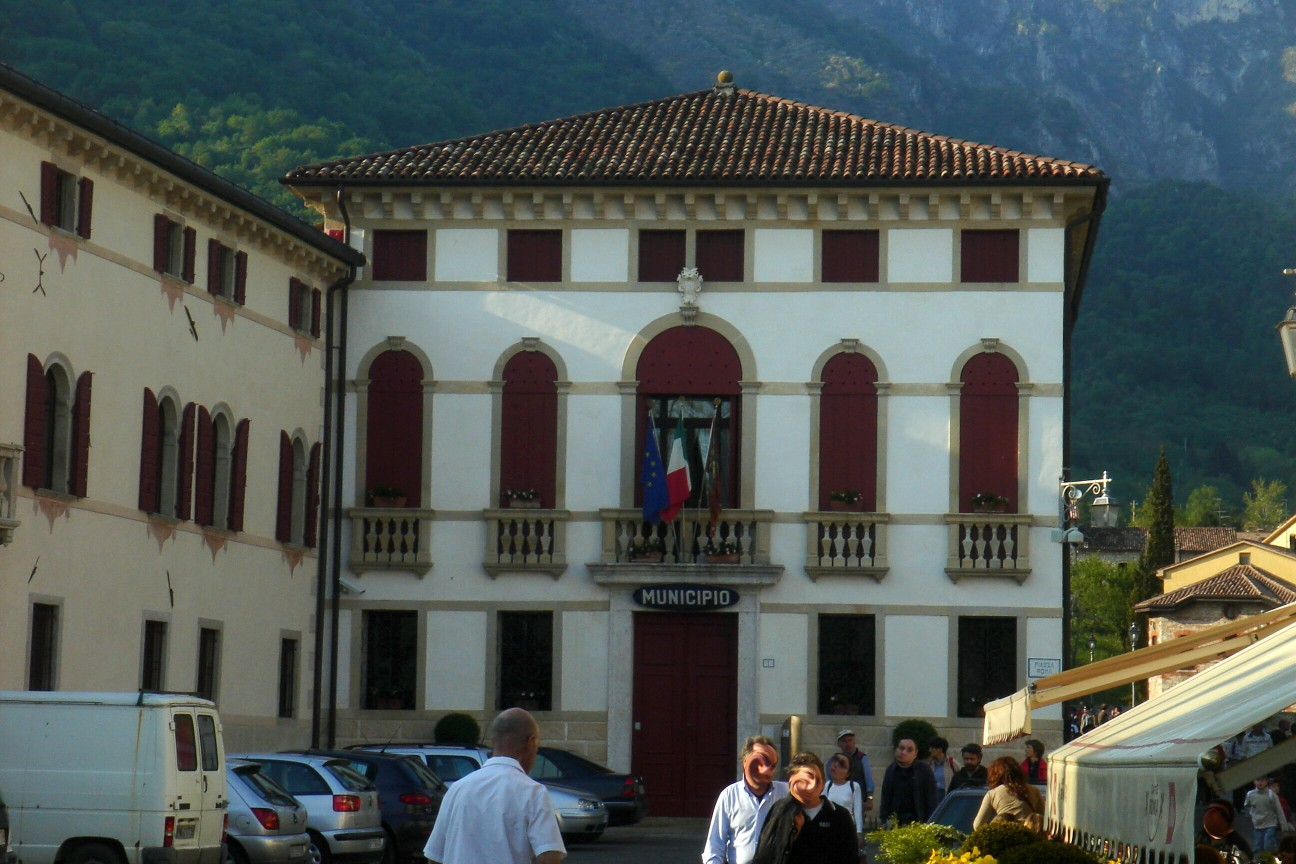
- Cison village centre

- Coat of arms

- Location within Italy Location within Veneto
- Coordinates: 45°58′N 12°08′E
- Country: Italy
- Region: Veneto
- Province: Treviso (TV)

Government
  - Mayor: Cristina Pin

Area
  - Total: 28 km^{2} (11 sq mi)
- Elevation: 261 m (856 ft)

Population (1st January 2025)
  - Total: 2,295
  - Density: 82/km^{2} (210/sq mi)
- Demonym: Cisonesi
- Time zone: UTC+1 (CET)
  - Summer (DST): UTC+2 (CEST)
- Postal code: 31030
- Dialing code: 0422
- Patron saint: St. John the Baptist
- Saint day: 24 June
- Website: Official website

Cison di Valmarino is a village and comune with 2,295 inhabitants in the province of Treviso, Veneto, north-eastern Italy. It is one of I Borghi più belli d'Italia ("The most beautiful villages of Italy") since 2019 it has boasted the Orange Flag tourism and environmental quality mark awarded by the Italian Touring Club. The village was the seat of the (historic) county of Valmareno (old spelling), formerly encompassing 2 castles and 20 villages and from 1439 belonging to the Brandolini family, the counts of Valmarino. The name is a portmanteau of valle (valley) and mara (marsh or wet place).

== History ==
=== Prehistory ===
There is evidence that the area has been inhabited since prehistoric times from archaeological discoveries in Follina from the Paleolithic Mesolithic eras, to roof tiles and other fragments from the Bronze Age found in Valmareno.

During the Roman period the Via Claudia Augusta a very important Roman road, which linked the valley of the Po River with Rhaetia (modern Austria) across the Alps, ran through this area.

The area became an important defensive position against barbarian invasions during the European Migration Period, with the fortress of CastelBrando being expanded and refortified. Around the 11th century, the bishops were succeeded by noble families. The fiefdom passed to the counts of Porcia and, following the marriage between Sofia di Colfosco and Guecello Da Camino (12th century), to the Caminesi family. When Rizzardo VI, the last of the Caminesi "di Sopra" (1335), died without heirs, the territory passed for a short period back to the bishops, who finally gave it to the Republic of Venice.

=== The Serenissima ===
It was only in 1421, however, that Venice was able to definitively establish its own podestà due to a series of events, including the claims of the Da Camino family. On February 18, 1436, Doge Francesco Foscari entrusted the territory to Erasmo da Narni (better known as Gattamelata) and Brandolino da Bagnacavallo, renowned condottieri who fought for the cause of Venice. However, the counts were forced to pay a heavy tax for feudal rights, so in 1439 the former renounced his rights, handing over the entire dominion to the latter. The descendants of Brandolino da Bagnacavallo, known as Brandolini and later Brandolini D'Adda, held Valmareno until 1797, when the Serenissima fell to Napoleon.

=== From the 19th to the late 20th century ===
Cison followed the fortunes of the entire Veneto region and, after passing from the French to the Austrians and vice versa, it was definitively Austrian, becoming part of the Lombard-Venetian Kingdom. From 1866, it was a municipality of the Kingdom of Italy.

However, Austrian occupation made itself felt again during the First World War, when Friuli and part of Veneto passed to the Central Powers. The area was involved in fierce fighting, being close to the front, from the Battle of the Solstice to the final Battle of Vittorio Veneto. During the Second World War the mountain environment favored the formation of several partisan brigades.

Today, Cison di Valmarino remains a village of numerous events that fill it with tourists from all over Italy.The 15th-century Villa Casagrande is now the home of Contessa Ghislaine Brandolini d’Adda.

== Monuments and places of interest ==
=== Religious architecture ===
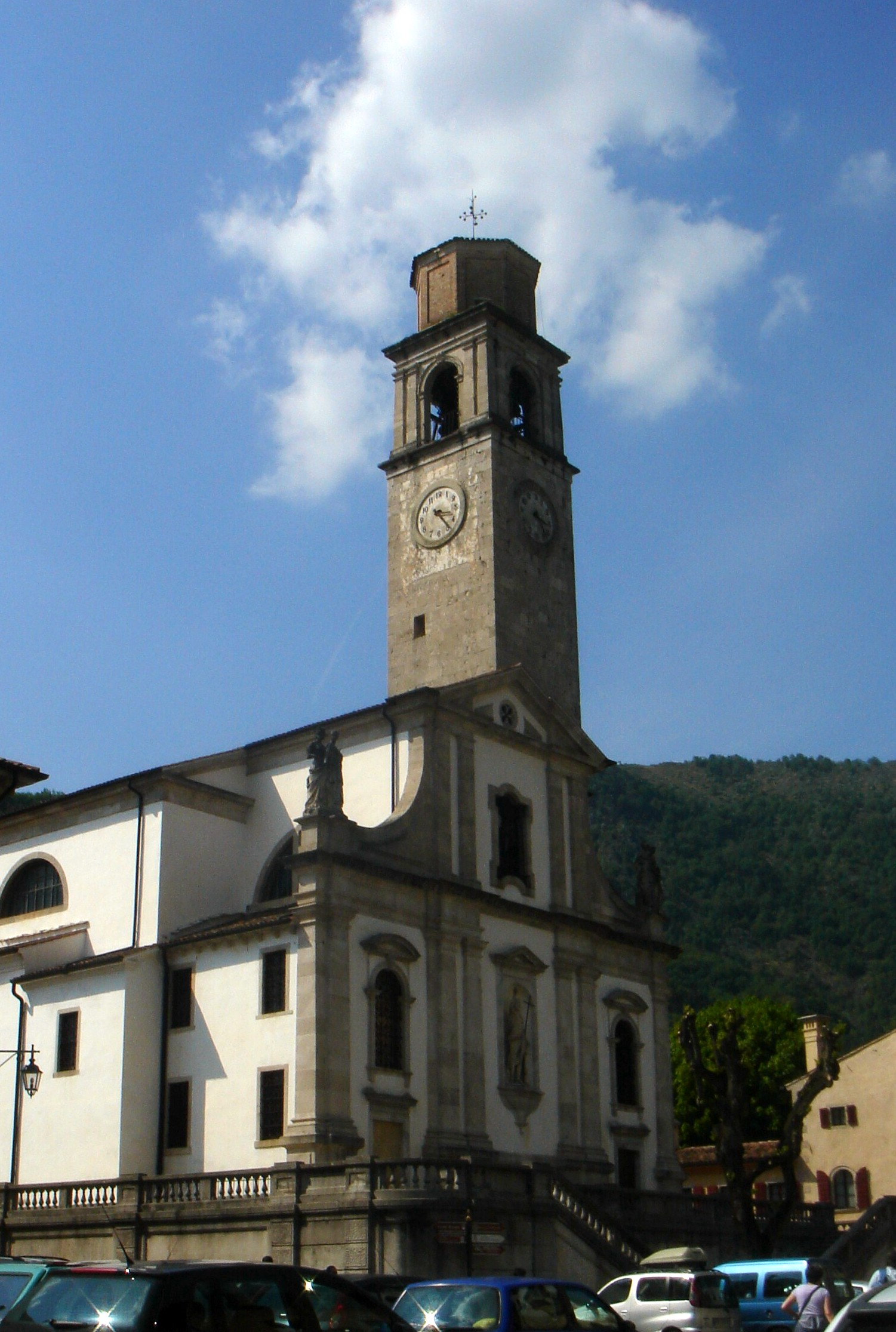
Church of St. John the Baptist.

- Church of Santa Maria Assunta and St. John the Baptist: the parish church of Cison di Valmarino, in the diocese of Vittorio Veneto; it is part of the deanery of the Valley.

=== Civil Architecture ===
- The Loggia: use as a theater after the fall of the Venetian Republic.
- Castle of Cison: also known as Castelbrando, it is the fortress that rises above the town and its rural and industrial areas, dominating the entire valley.
- The Municipal Library: established in 1976, has a bibliographic collection of approximately 14,500 volumes.
- Case Marian: they are a complex located at the foot of the hill where Castelbrando stands. It is a farmhouse-style building dating back to the 17th century, commissioned by Count Brandolini and intended for the sharecroppers who worked his rural estates.

=== Natural areas ===
- Monumental plane tree: in the garden of Villa Brandolini stands a large Platanus orientalis.
- Monumental Cedar of Lebanon: large Cedrus libani that grows in the Castle area.
- Bosco delle Penne Mozze: a natural and protected area between the Treviso Prealps and the hilly system of the Alta Pianura Trevigiana in the municipality.
- Via dell'Acqua and Rural Museum: is an historical and naturalistic itinerary and museum of knowledge and memories, stretches for three kilometers at the foot of the Treviso Prealps.

== Demographic evolution ==
Historical population

Year	Pop.	±%
1861	?	—
1871	4,066	—
1881	4,224	+3.9%
1901	3,650	−13.6%
1911	4,388	+20.2%
1921	4,339	−1.1%

Year	Pop.	±%
1931	4,073	−6.1%
1936	3,422	−16.0%
1951	3,287	−3.9%
1961	2,940	−10.6%
1971	2,471	−16.0%
1981	2,365	−4.3%

Year	Pop.	±%
1991	2,401	+1.5%
2001	2,553	+6.3%
2011	2,711	+6.2%
2021	2,540	−6.3%

Source: Data from ISTAT

=== Ethnic groups and foreign minorities ===
As of 1st January 2025, there were 236 foreigners residing in the municipality, or 9.5% of the population. The largest foreign community is Moroccan, with 31.4% of all foreigners present in the area, followed by Romanian and Albanian citizens.

== Culture ==
=== Theater ===
The Loggia's use as a theater after the fall of the Venetian Republic determined the subsequent adaptations that took place throughout the 19th century. The building was destroyed in 1918 during the Great War. Subsequently repurposed, it became a cinema in the 1930s, with interventions that dramatically altered the original 17th-century structure. It remained in use until the 1960s, when it was closed as it no longer met changing needs. Restoration work began in 1993 and was completed in 2002, allowing Cison to return its Loggia. On the ground floor it houses the Theater and the headquarters of the Pro Loco of Cison, on the first floor an exhibition room and on the top floor is the Museum of Vintage Radio on an area of about 250 square meters.

=== Events ===
In 2025, on the occasion of the 25th anniversary of death of Virgilio Floriani, the Municipality of Cison promoted a series of events entitled “It seemed like magic to everyone”. His figure of is celebrated in the local Vintage Radio Museum and in numerous cultural and commemorative initiatives.

== Anthropic geography ==
=== Hamlets ===
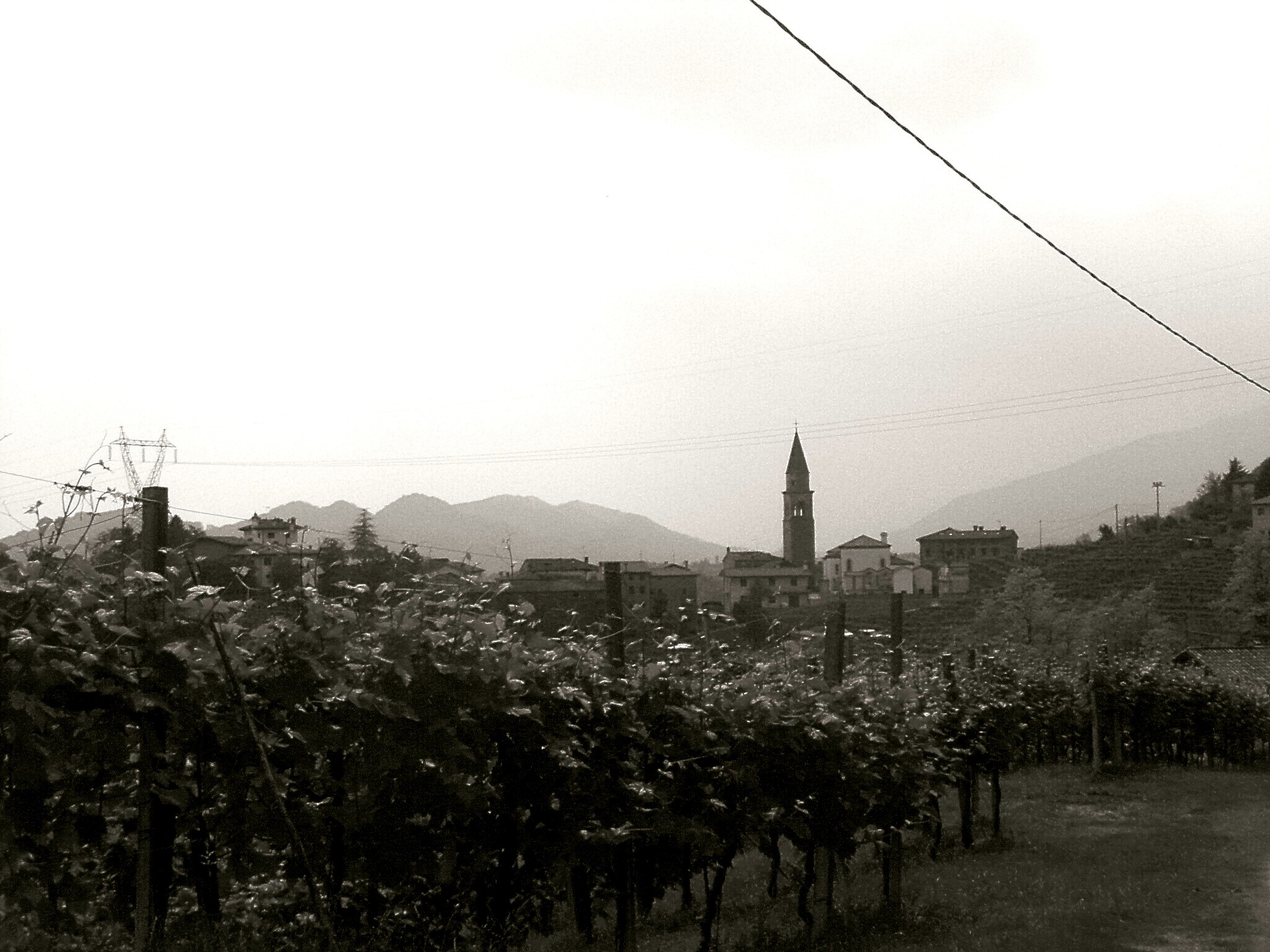
View of Rolle

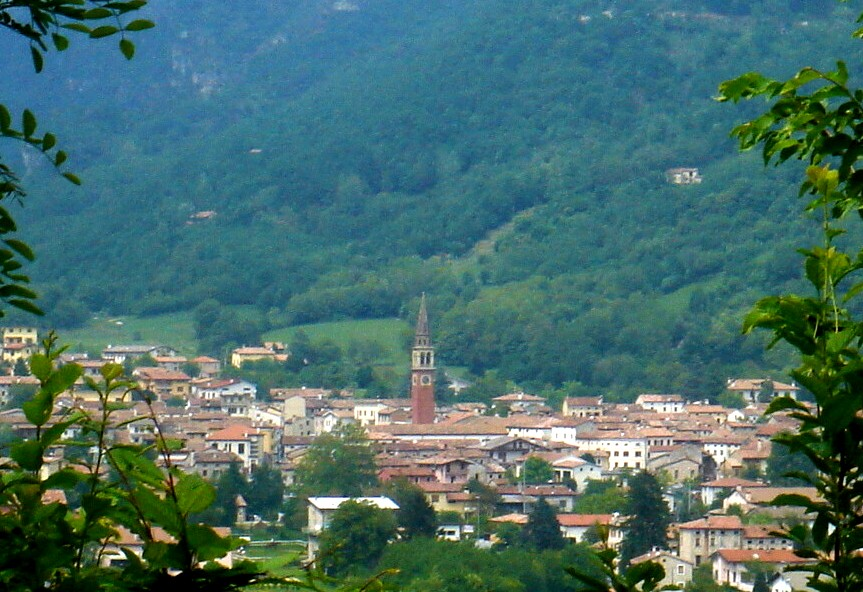
View of the center of Tovena

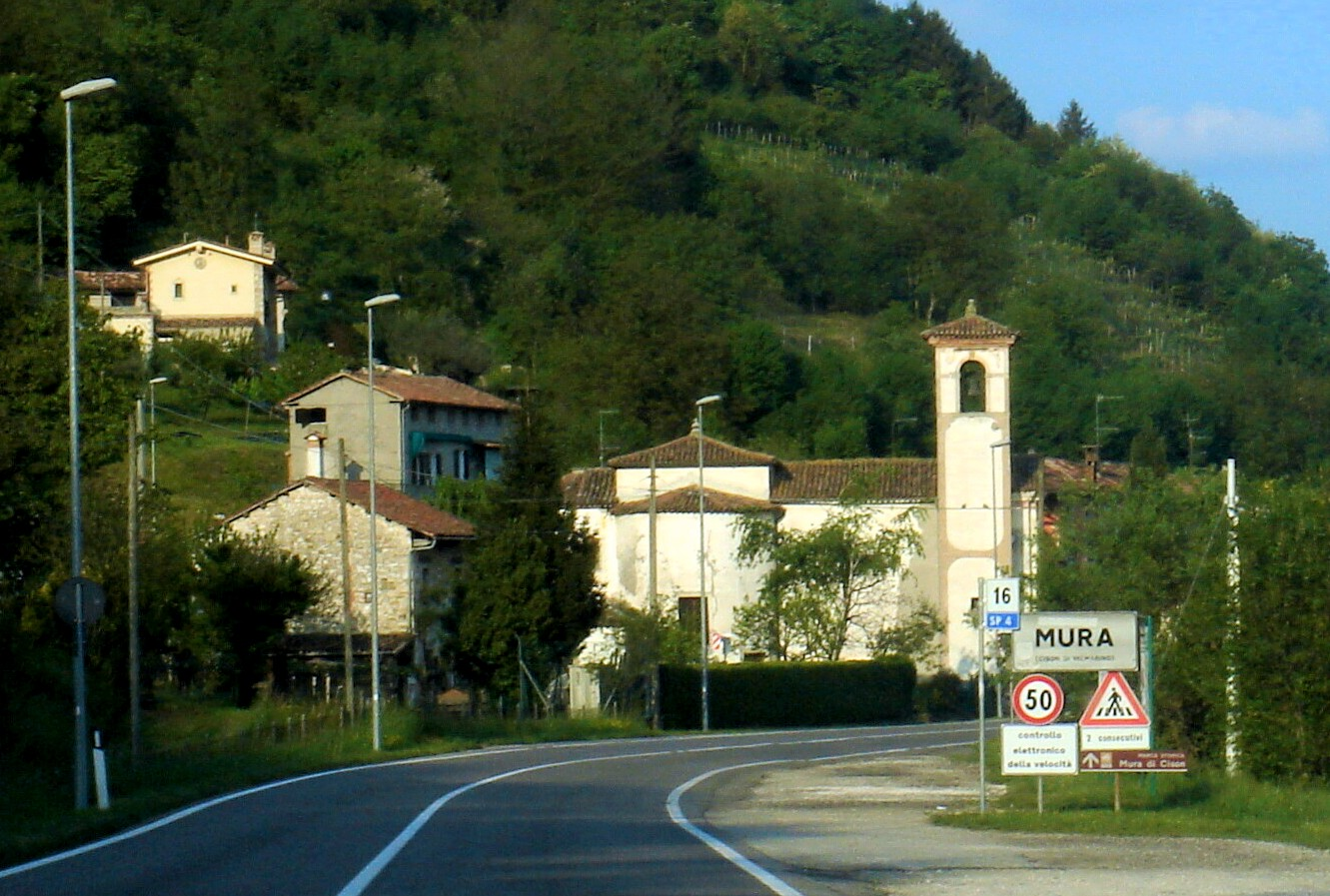
Walls

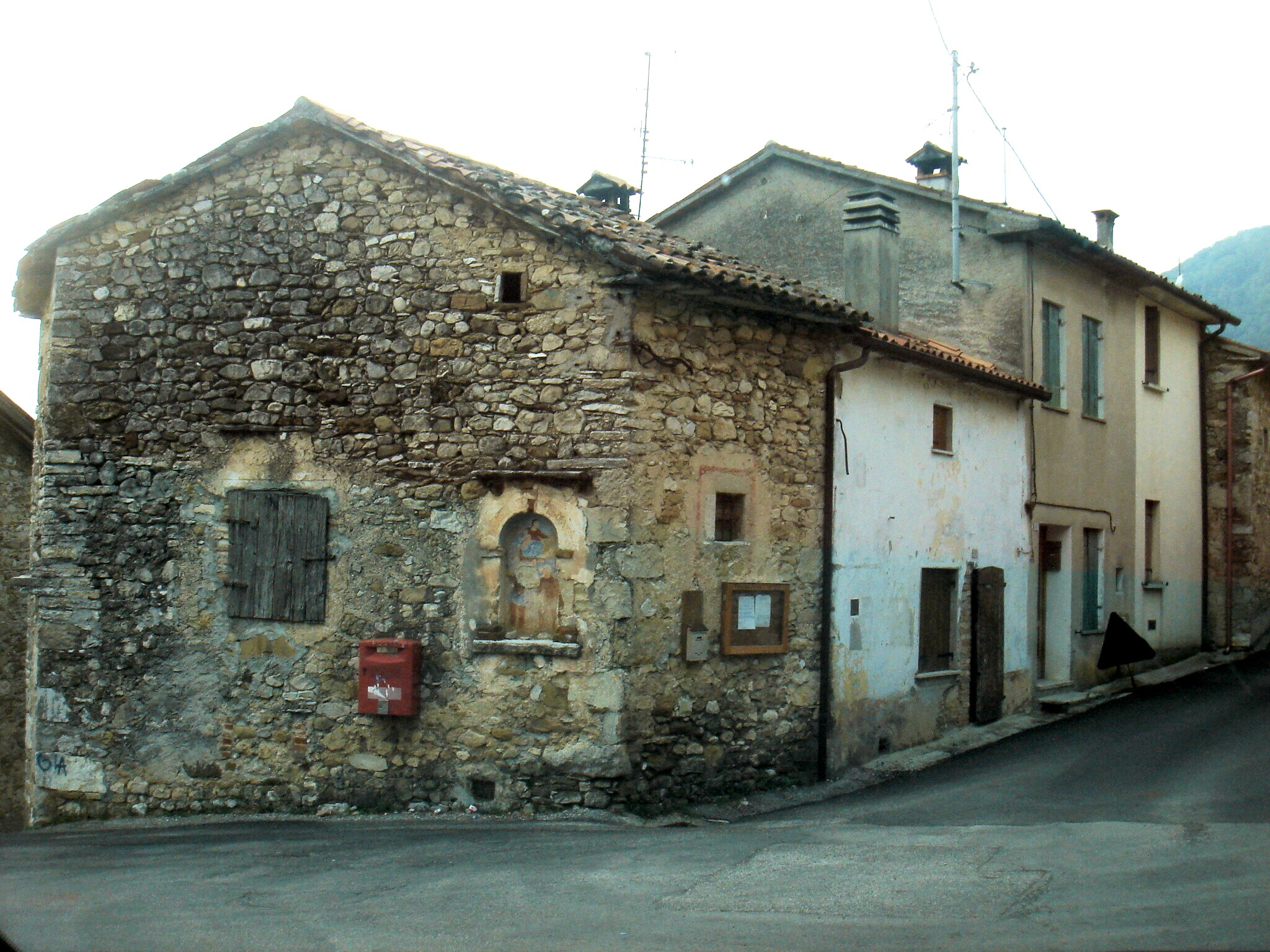
Borgo of the historic center of Gai

== Infrastructure and transport ==
Cison di Valmarino is located a short distance (about 14 km) from the "Vittorio Veneto Nord" toll booth on the Autostrada A27 d'Alemagna. The nearest railway station is also located in the municipality of Vittorio Veneto on the Ponte nelle Alpi-Conegliano Railway line.

== Notable people ==
- Egidio dall'Oglio, Italian painter
- Virgilio Floriani, Italian engineer
- Walter Cecchinel, French mountaineers of Italian origin
