= Follina =

Follina, Italy
- Comune
- Comune di Follina
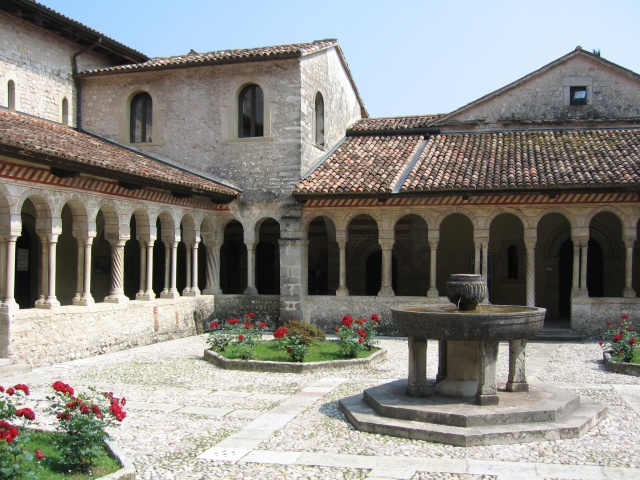
- The abbey cloister

- Location within Italy Location within Veneto
- Coordinates: 45°57′N 12°7′E
- Country: Italy
- Region: Veneto
- Province: Treviso (TV)
- Frazioni: Farrò, Pedeguarda, Col di Follina, Valmareno

Government
  - Mayor: Mario Collet

Area
  - Total: 24.2 km^{2} (9.3 sq mi)
- Elevation: 191 m (627 ft)

Population (Dec. 2004)
  - Total: 3,919
  - Density: 162/km^{2} (419/sq mi)
- Demonym: Follinesi
- Time zone: UTC+1 (CET)
  - Summer (DST): UTC+2 (CEST)
- Postal code: 31051
- Dialing code: 0438
- Website: Official website

Follina is a comune (municipality) in the Province of Treviso in the Italian region Veneto, located about 60 kilometres (37 miles) northwest of Venice and about 35 km (22 mi) northwest of Treviso. It is one of I Borghi più belli d'Italia ("The most beautiful villages of Italy").

Follina is situated in the Treviso countryside, on the "Strada del Prosecco" ("Prosecco wine route"), in the Venetian Prealps. It is home to the eponymous abbey, built here in 1170 with the patronage of the Patriarch of Aquileia. St. Charles Borromeo was its abbot.

== Twin towns ==
Follina is twinned with:

- Wipfeld, Germany
