= Monastero di Santa Chiara =

Monastery in San Marino

Santa Chiara Monastery
- Monastero di Santa Chiara

- Denomination: Catholic

History
- Consecrated: 1971

Architecture
- Years built: 1969

Administration
- Diocese: San Marino-Montefeltro

Monastero di Santa Chiara is a church in San Marino, in the Roman Catholic Diocese of San Marino-Montefeltro. It is located in the Santuario del Cuore Immacolato di Maria in the Valdragone curazia of Borgo Maggiore. The construction of the current monastery was begun in 1969 and it was opened to worshippers in 1971. It hosts 17 nuns of the Clarisses order that moved from the City of San Marino, the new construction is on the site of the old monastery build in 1565, the building of which has been promoted by Bishop Costantino Bonelli.
