= ISO 3166-2:SM =

Entry for San Marino in ISO 3166-2

ISO 3166-2:SM is the entry for San Marino in ISO 3166-2, part of the ISO 3166 standard published by the International Organization for Standardization (ISO), which defines codes for the names of the principal subdivisions (e.g., provinces or states) of all countries coded in ISO 3166-1.

Currently for San Marino, ISO 3166-2 codes are defined for nine municipalities.

Each code consists of two parts separated by a hyphen. The first part is SM, the ISO 3166-1 alpha-2 code of San Marino. The second part is two digits (01–09).

== Current codes ==
Subdivision names are listed as in the ISO 3166-2 standard published by the ISO 3166 Maintenance Agency (ISO 3166/MA).

Click on the button in the header to sort each column.

Code	Subdivision name (it)
SM-01	Acquaviva
SM-06	Borgo Maggiore
SM-02	Chiesanuova
SM-07	Città di San Marino (local variant is San Marino)
SM-03	Domagnano
SM-04	Faetano
SM-05	Fiorentino
SM-08	Montegiardino
SM-09	Serravalle

== Changes ==
The following changes to the entry are listed on ISO's online catalogue, the Online Browsing Platform:

Effective date of change	Short description of change (en)	Code/Subdivision change
2020-11-24	Change of spelling of SM-07; Addition of local variation for SM-07; Update List Source	Subdivisions renamed: SM-07 San Marino → Città di San Marino

The following changes to the entry have been announced in newsletters by the ISO 3166/MA since the first publication of ISO 3166-2 in 1998. ISO stopped issuing newsletters in 2013.

Newsletter	Date issued	Description of change in newsletter	Code/Subdivision change
Newsletter I-8	2007-04-17	Addition of the administrative subdivisions and of their code elements	Subdivisions added: 9 municipalities

== See also ==
- Subdivisions of San Marino
- FIPS region codes of San Marino
- Neighbouring country: IT
