= Valgiurata =

Curazia of Serravalle, San Marino

- Curazia
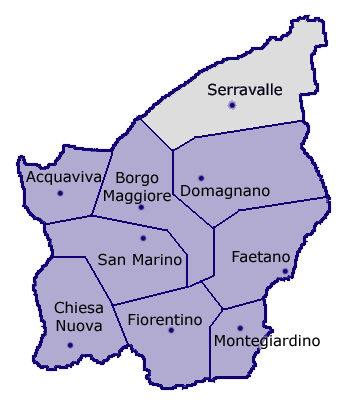
- Location of Serravalle within San Marino

- Location within San Marino
- Coordinates: 43°57′52.27″N 12°29′12.26″E
- Country: San Marino
- Municipality: Serravalle
- Elevation: 150 m (490 ft)
- Demonym: Valgiuratesi
- Time zone: UTC+1 (CET)
  - Summer (DST): UTC+2 (CEST)
- Postal code: 47891
- Area code: +378 (0549)

Valgiurata (lit. 'Oath valley'), also known as Le Tane, is a curazia of San Marino. It belongs to the municipality of Serravalle.

== History ==
The name, literary meaning oath valley, derives from a popular legend regarding the daughter of a country gentleman who suicided in the tower of the local castle. She was locked in the tower by her father, due to his disagreement to the love feelings of the girl for a soldier. She screamed day and night and, before dying she made an oath to search his lover in all the valley. The legend says that it is possible to hear, still today, the girl's voice in the castle.

== Geography ==
The little village is located in the southern suburb of Serravalle, on the same-named road linking it to Torraccia, Fiorina and Domagnano.

== Main sights ==
The castle and the tower of Valgiurata was completely restored by an American surveyor, that replaced the old decaying structure.
