= Casole =

Curazia of the City of San Marino, San Marino

- Curazia
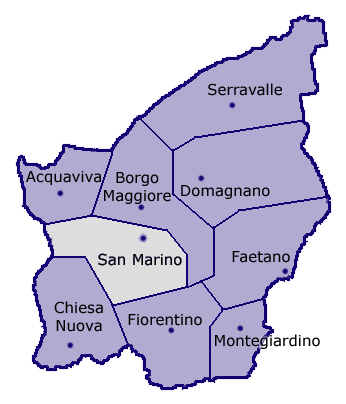
- Location of the castello of the City of San Marino within San Marino

- Location within San Marino
- Coordinates: 43°55′2.4″N 12°26′37.8″E
- Country: San Marino
- Castello: San Marino
- Elevation: 450 m (1,480 ft)
- Demonym: Casolani
- Time zone: UTC+1 (CET)
  - Summer (DST): UTC+2 (CEST)
- Postal code: 47890
- Area code: +378 (0549)

Casole is a curazia of San Marino, in the castello of the City of San Marino.
