= Ponte Mellini =

Curazia of Serravalle, San Marino

- Curazia
- Interactive map of Ponte Mellini
- Coordinates: 43°58′25″N 12°28′57″E
- Country: San Marino
- Municipality: Serravalle
- Time zone: UTC+1 (CET)
  - Summer (DST): UTC+2 (CEST)

Ponte Mellini is a curazia of San Marino. It belongs to the municipality of Serravalle.
