= Cà Berlone =

Curazia of the City of San Marino, San Marino

- Curazia
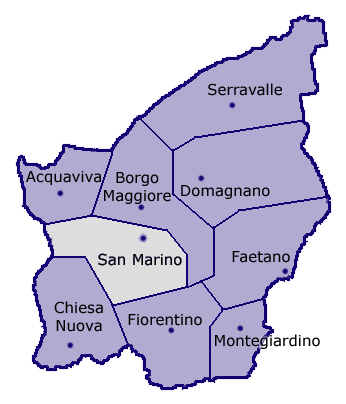
- Location of the castello of the City of San Marino within San Marino

- Location within San Marino
- Coordinates: 43°55′56.4″N 12°25′24″E
- Country: San Marino
- Castello: City of San Marino
- Elevation: 320 m (1,050 ft)
- Demonym: Berlonesi
- Time zone: UTC+1 (CET)
  - Summer (DST): UTC+2 (CEST)
- Postal code: 47890
- Area code: +378 (0549)

Cà Berlone (also named Cà Berloni) is a curazia of San Marino, in the castello of the City of San Marino.
