= Spaccio Giannoni =

Curazia of Domagnano, San Marino

Spacio Giannoni
- Curazia
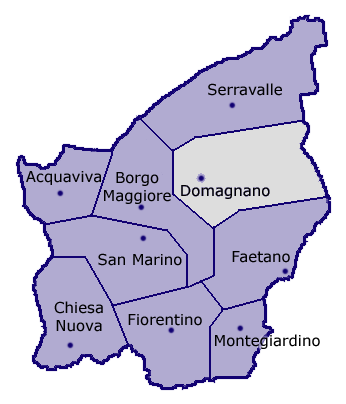
- Location of Domagnano within San Marino

- Location within San Marino
- Coordinates: 43°57′11.6″N 12°30′26.4″E
- Country: San Marino
- Castello: Domagnano
- Elevation: 357 m (1,171 ft)

Population (2003)
  - Total: 889
- Demonym: gianneni
- Time zone: UTC+1 (CET)
  - Summer (DST): UTC+2 (CEST)
- Postal code: 47895
- Area code: +378 (0549)

Spaccio Giannoni is a curazia of San Marino, in the castello of Domagnano.
