= Crociale =

Curazia of Fiorentino, San Marino

- Curazia
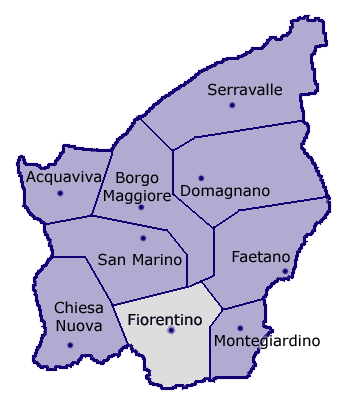
- Location of Fiorentino within San Marino

- Location within San Marino
- Coordinates: 43°54′41.8″N 12°27′6.48″E
- Country: San Marino
- Castello: Fiorentino
- Elevation: 450 m (1,480 ft)
- Demonym: Crocialesi
- Time zone: UTC+1 (CET)
  - Summer (DST): UTC+2 (CEST)
- Postal code: 47897
- Area code: +378 (0549)

Crociale is a curazia of San Marino, in the castello of Fiorentino.

== Geography ==
The village, sometimes named Crociale di Fiorentino, is located between Murata and Fiorentino, on a main road linking the city of San Marino to Mercatino Conca, in Italy.
