= Piandivello =

Curazia of Domagnano, San Marino

Coordinates: 43.9500°N 12.4833°E

Piandivello is a curazia of San Marino, in the castello of Domagnano.
