= Cà Giannino =

Curazia of Domagnano, San Marino

Coordinates: 43.9354°N 12.4655°E

Cà Giannino is a curazia of San Marino, in the castello of Domagnano.
