= Canepa, San Marino =

Curazia of the City of San Marino, San Marino

Coordinates: 43.9322°N 12.4486°E

Canepa is a curazia of San Marino, in the castello of the City of San Marino.
