= Cà Rigo =

Curazia of Borgo Maggiore, San Marino

Coordinates: 43.9431°N 12.4457°E

Cà Rigo is a curazia of San Marino, in the castello of Borgo Maggiore.
