= Cà Ragni =

Curazia of Serravalle, San Marino

Coordinates: 43.9680°N 12.4766°E

Cà Ragni is a curazia of San Marino. It belongs to the municipality of Serravalle.
