= Lesignano =

Curazia of Serravalle, San Marino

Coordinates: 43.962°N 12.483°E

Lesignano is a curazia of San Marino. It belongs to the municipality of Serravalle.
