= Cerbaiola =

Curazia of Montegiardino, San Marino

- Village
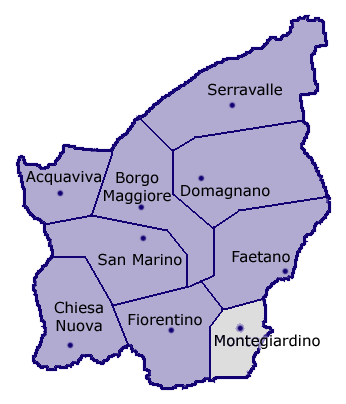
- Location of Montegiardino within San Marino

- Location within San Marino
- Coordinates: 43°54′10.51″N 12°28′37.6″E
- Country: San Marino
- Municipality: Montegiardino
- Elevation: 350 m (1,150 ft)
- Demonym: Cerbaiolesi
- Time zone: UTC+1 (CET)
  - Summer (DST): UTC+2 (CEST)
- Postal code: 47898
- Area code: +378 (0549)

Cerbaiola is a curazia of San Marino, and the only curazia of the castello of Montegiardino.

== Geography ==
The village is located in the south-western area of its municipality, on a road linking Montegiardino and Fiorentino.
