= Cinque Vie =

Curazia of Serravalle, San Marino

Coordinates: 43.9500°N 12.5000°E

Cinque Vie (lit. 'Five Ways') is a curazia of San Marino. It belongs to the municipality of Serravalle.
