= Teglio, San Marino =

Curazia of Chiesanuova, San Marino

Coordinates: 43.9000°N 12.4167°E

Teglio is a curazia of San Marino, in the castello of Chiesanuova.
