= Valdragone =

Curazie of Borgo Maggiore, San Marino

- Curazie
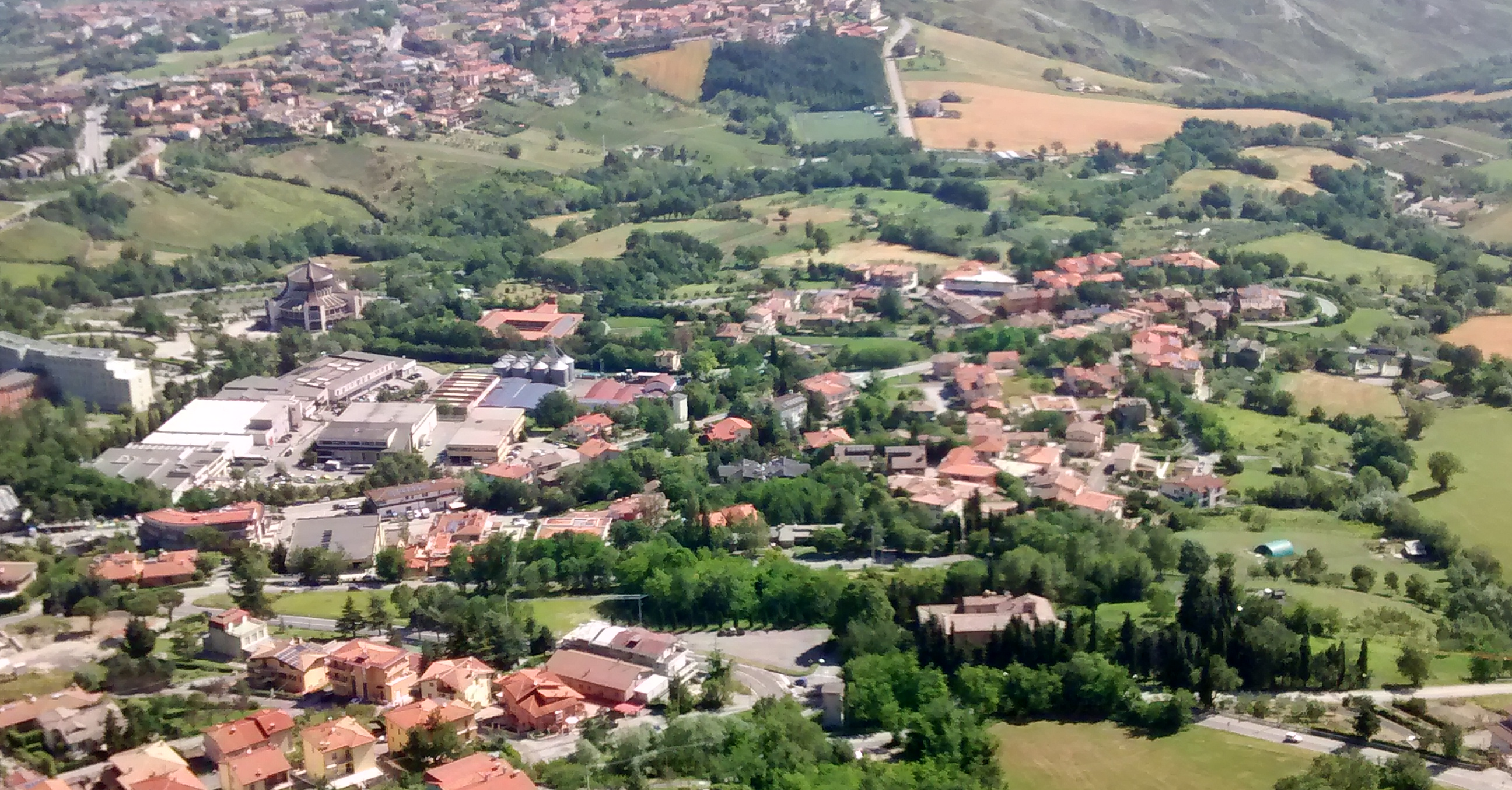

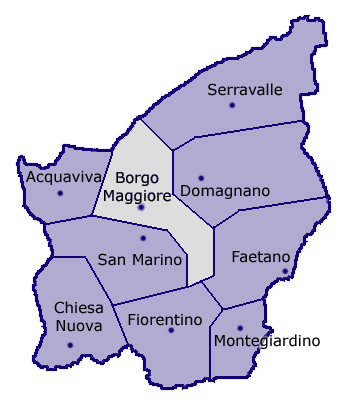
- Location of Borgo Maggiore within San Marino

- Location within San Marino
- Coordinates: 43°56′23.76″N 12°27′27.12″E
- Country: San Marino
- Castello: Borgo Maggiore
- Constituent curazie: List: Valdragone di Sopra, Valdragone di Sotto
- Elevation: 466 m (1,529 ft)

Population (2023)
  - Total: 6,983
- Demonym: valdragonesi
- Time zone: UTC+1 (CET)
  - Summer (DST): UTC+2 (CEST)
- Postal code: 47893
- Area code: +378 (0549)

Valdragone is a settlement in San Marino comprising two curazie, Valdragone di Sopra and Valdragone di Sotto, in the castello of Borgo Maggiore.

== Geography ==
The village is situated east of Borgo Maggiore and also close to Cailungo and Domagnano.

== History ==
The name of Valdragone appears for the first time in historical documents of 1253. The Monastero di Santa Chiara was built from 1969 to 1971.

According to legend, the name "Valdragone" comes from stories of a dragon that appeared there. From Italian val, apocopic form of valle ("valley") + dragone ("dragon").
