= Poggio Chiesanuova =

Curazia of Chiesanuova, San Marino

- Curazia
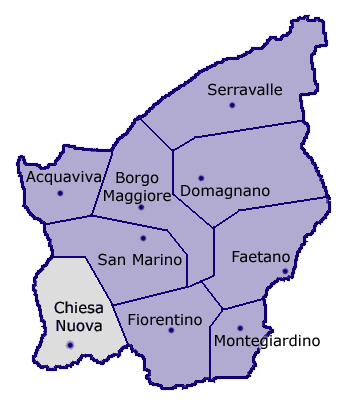
- Location of Chiesanuova within San Marino

- Location within San Marino
- Coordinates: 43°54′28.31″N 12°25′17.58″E
- Country: San Marino
- Castello: Chiesanuova
- Elevation: 500 m (1,600 ft)
- Demonym: poggesi
- Time zone: UTC+1 (CET)
  - Summer (DST): UTC+2 (CEST)
- Postal code: 47894
- Area code: +378 (0549)

Poggio Chiesanuova is a curazia of San Marino, in the castello of Chiesanuova.

== Geography ==
The village is situated in the northern suburb of Chiesanuova, on the road to Acquaviva.

== Sport ==
Close to Poggio is located the Chiesanuova Stadium, home ground of the S.S. Pennarossa (football), the Rugby Club San Marino and the San Marino national rugby union team.
