= San Giovanni sotto le Penne =

Curazia of Borgo Maggiore, San Marino

- Curazia
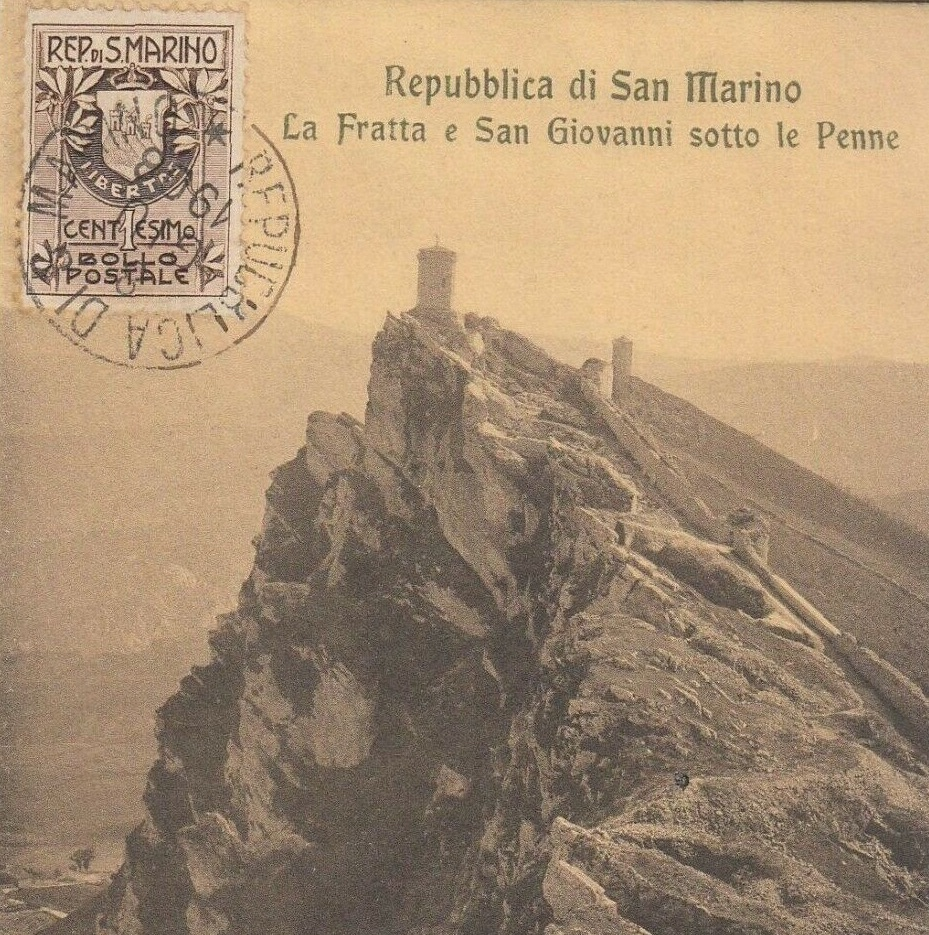

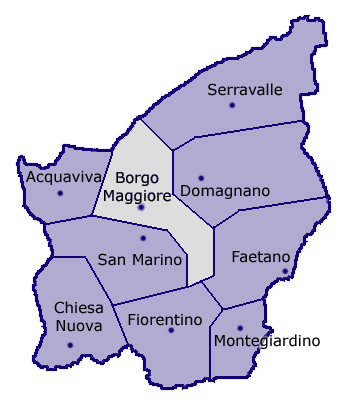
- Location of Borgo Maggiore within San Marino

- Location within San Marino
- Coordinates: 43°55′36.24″N 12°27′23.52″E
- Country: San Marino
- Castello: Borgo Maggiore
- Elevation: 460 m (1,510 ft)

Population (2023)
  - Total: 30
- Demonym: sangiovannesi
- Time zone: UTC+1 (CET)
  - Summer (DST): UTC+2 (CEST)
- Postal code: 47893
- Area code: +378 (0549)

San Giovanni sotto le Penne is a curazia of San Marino, located in the castello of Borgo Maggiore.

== Geography ==
It is located south of the country's highest point Monte Titano, on a road bordering the territory of the city of San Marino. It includes the archaeological site of Maiano.

== Sport ==
The local football team is the San Giovanni.
