= Cà Chiavello =

Curazia of Faetano, San Marino

Coordinates: 43.9167°N 12.4824°E

Cà Chiavello is a curazia of San Marino, in the castello of Faetano.
