= Galavotto =

Curazia of Chiesanuova, San Marino

Coordinates: 43.9167°N 12.4167°E

Galavotto is a curazia of San Marino, in the castello of Chiesanuova.
