= Confine =

Curazia of Chiesanuova, San Marino

- Curazia
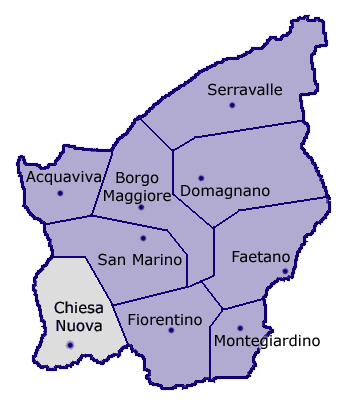
- Location of Chiesanuova within San Marino

- Location within San Marino
- Coordinates: 43°54′3.84″N 12°24′45.96″E
- Country: San Marino
- Castello: Chiesanuova
- Elevation: 400 m (1,300 ft)
- Demonym: confinesi
- Time zone: UTC+1 (CET)
  - Summer (DST): UTC+2 (CEST)
- Postal code: 47894
- Area code: +378 (0549)

Confine (lit. 'border') is a curazia of San Marino, in the castello of Chiesanuova.

== Geography ==
The village is situated in the southern corner of the state, close to the borders with Italy and the municipalities of San Leo and Verucchio. It is one of the southernmost villages of San Marino.
