= Cà Melone =

Curazia of Borgo Maggiore, San Marino

Coordinates: 43.9432°N 12.4476°E

Cà Melone is a curazia of San Marino, in the castello of Borgo Maggiore.
