= Poggio Casalino =

Curazia of Chiesanuova, San Marino

- Curazia
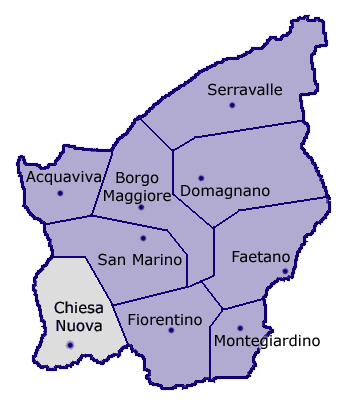
- Location of Chiesanuova within San Marino

- Location within San Marino
- Coordinates: 43°55′15.84″N 12°24′38.4″E
- Country: San Marino
- Castello: Chiesanuova
- Elevation: 340 m (1,120 ft)
- Demonym: casalinesi
- Time zone: UTC+1 (CET)
  - Summer (DST): UTC+2 (CEST)
- Postal code: 47894
- Area code: +378 (0549)

Poggio Casalino is a curazia of San Marino, in the castello of Chiesanuova.

== Geography ==
The village is situated in the western border of its municipality, close to the borders with Italy and the municipality of San Leo. It lies on a road that links the city of San Marino with the rural area of San Leo and some of its civil parishes.
