= Calligaria =

Curazia of Faetano, San Marino

Coordinates: 43.9256°N 12.4988°E

Calligaria is a curazia of San Marino, in the castello of Faetano.
