= Caladino =

Curazia of Chiesanuova, San Marino

Coordinates: 43.9044°N 12.4206°E

Caladino is a curazia of San Marino, in the castello of Chiesanuova.
