= Gualdicciolo =

Curazia of Acquaviva, San Marino

- Curazia
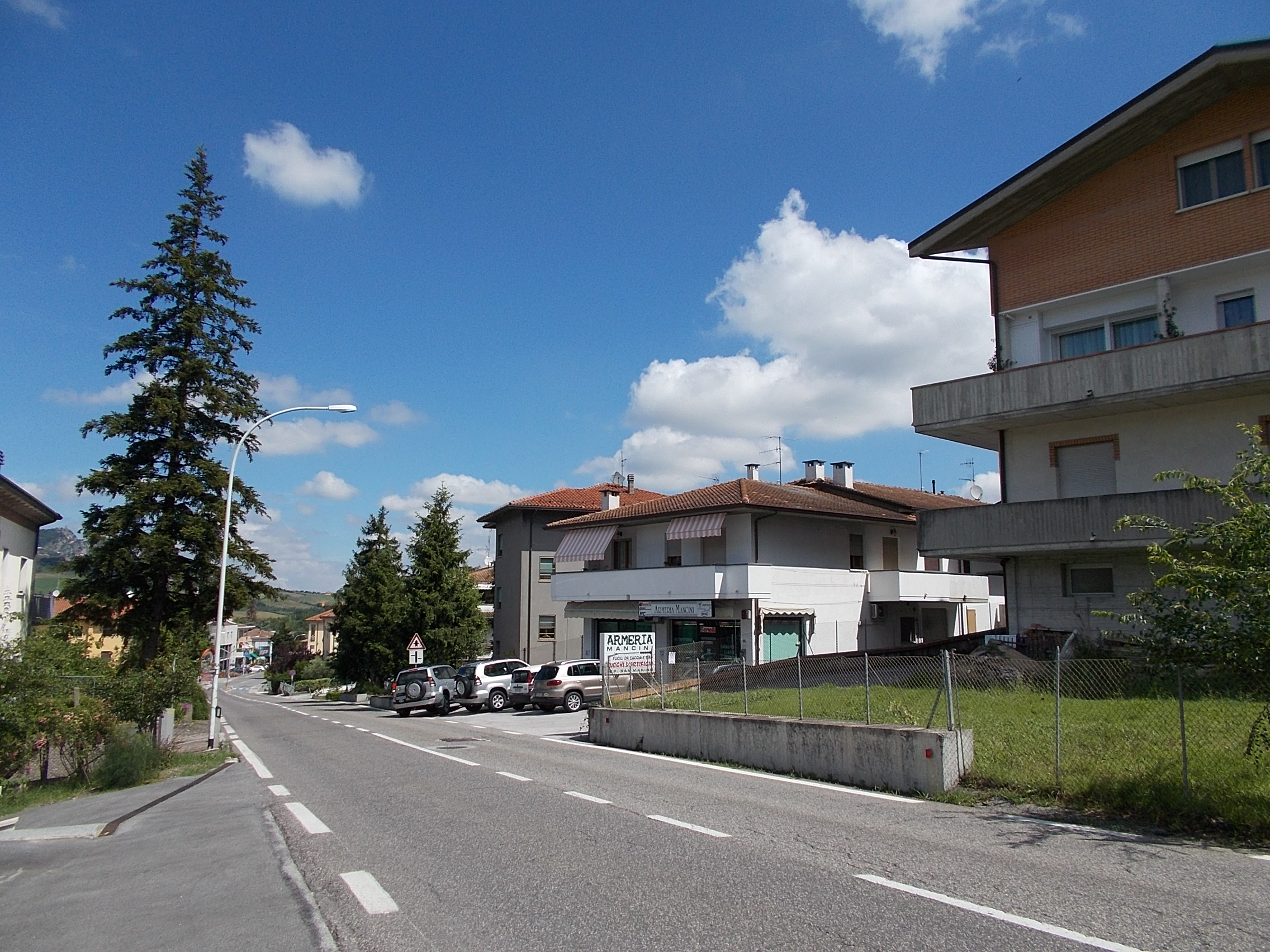
- Via Rivo Fontanelle in Gualdicciolo

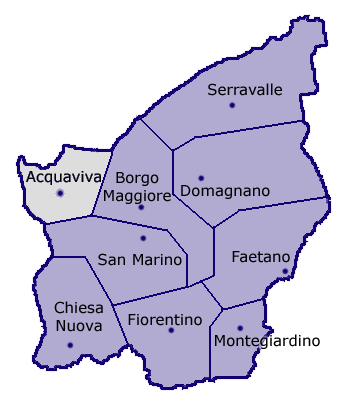
- Location of Acquaviva within San Marino

- Location within San Marino
- Coordinates: 43°57′2.88″N 12°24′23.64″E
- Country: San Marino
- Castello: Acquaviva
- Elevation: 450 m (1,480 ft)
- Demonym: gualdicciolesi
- Time zone: UTC+1 (CET)
  - Summer (DST): UTC+2 (CEST)
- Postal code: 47892
- Area code: +378 (0549)
- Climate: Cfa

Gualdicciolo is a curazia of San Marino, in the castello of Acquaviva. It is Acquaviva's most populated curazia.

== Geography ==
The village is situated in the western corner of San Marino, close to the borders with Italy and the municipalities of San Leo and Verucchio, in Emilia-Romagna. The nearest Italian village to Gualdicciolo is Torello, part of San Leo.

== Economy ==
Due to its position in a flat valley, Gualdicciolo has one of the most developed industrial areas of the state, with many manufacturing factories.
