= Santa Mustiola =

Curazia of the City of San Marino, San Marino

- Curazia
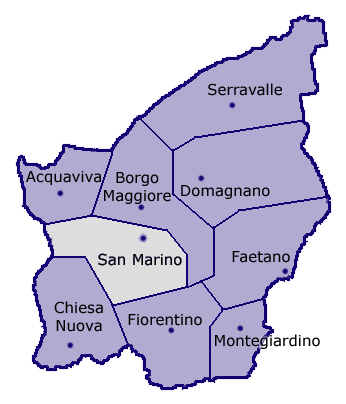
- Location of the castello of the City of San Marino within San Marino

- Location within San Marino
- Coordinates: 43°56′3.96″N 12°26′17.64″E
- Country: San Marino
- Castello: San Marino
- Elevation: 460 m (1,510 ft)
- Demonym: Sammustiolesi
- Time zone: UTC+1 (CET)
  - Summer (DST): UTC+2 (CEST)
- Postal code: 47890
- Area code: +378 (0549)

Santa Mustiola is a curazia of San Marino, in the castello of the City of San Marino.

Its name derives from a Catholic saint, Mustiola, cousin of the Roman Emperor Claudius II.

== Geography ==
The village is situated under the Mount Titano and few km in west of the city of San Marino.

== Sport ==
Santa Mustiola had a local football club, the Aurora, active from 1968 to 1987.
