= Castellaro, San Marino =

Curazia of the City of San Marino, San Marino

Coordinates: 43.9333°N 12.4333°E

Castellaro is a curazia of San Marino, in the castello of the City of San Marino.
