= Chiesanuova =

Castello of San Marino

Chiesanuova Cisanòva (Romagnol)
- Castello
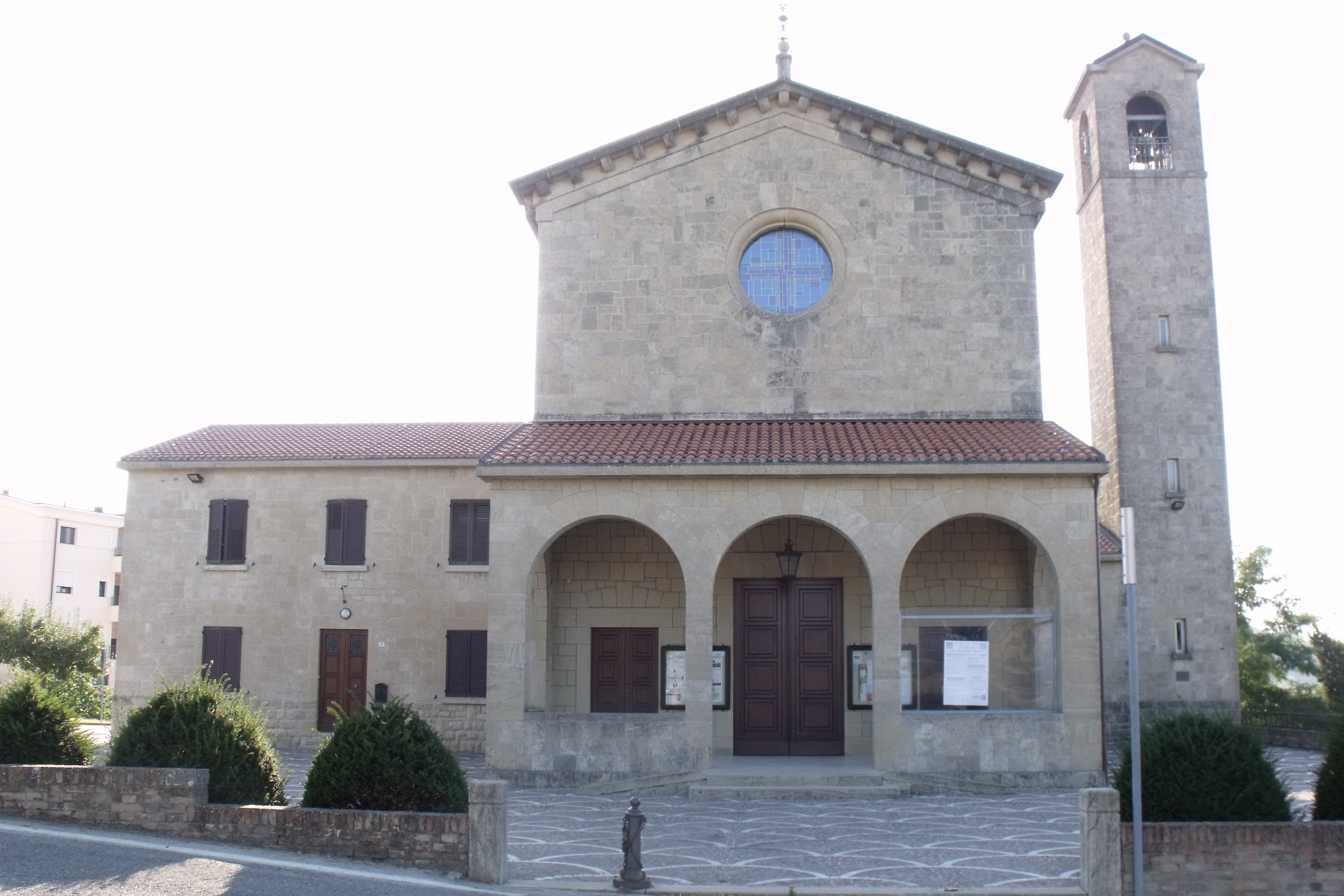
- Church in Chiesanuova

- Flag Coat of arms

- Chiesanuova's location in San Marino

- Location within San Marino
- Coordinates: 43°54′16.08″N 12°25′15.06″E
- Country: San Marino
- Curazie: List: Caladino, Confine, Galavotto, Molarini, Poggio Casalino, Poggio Chiesanuova, Teglio

Government
  - Capitano: Marino Giardi (Chiesanuova Avanti; since 2025)

Area
  - Total: 5.46 km^{2} (2.11 sq mi)
- Elevation: 450 m (1,480 ft)

Population (January 2025)
  - Total: 1,191
- Time zone: UTC+1 (CET)
  - Summer (DST): CEST
- Postal code: 47894
- Climate: Cfb
- Website: https://www.gov.sm/pub1/GovSM/Istituzioni-e-Forze/Giunte-di-Castello/Castello-di-Chiesanuova.html

Chiesanuova (Romagnol: Cisanòva; lit. 'New church') is one of the nine castelli of San Marino. It has a population of 1,191 inhabitants (January 2025) in an area of 5.46 km^{2}. The castello is governed by a Captain and a seven-member Junta, with Marino Rosti serving as Captain since 2020. Formerly known as Pennarossa until the administrative reforms of 1943–1944, Chiesanuova borders two San Marinese municipalities and three Italian communes, and is divided into seven curazie (parishes).

== History ==
The medieval castle of Busignano was situated in this area, and in 1320, its inhabitants decided to join San Marino. The name Chiesanuova dates back to the 16th century, around the rebuilding of the church of Saint Giovanni Battista in Curte, which no longer exists. The renovation of Salvatore Conti Square was conceived by the Italian poet, writer, and screenwriter Tonino Guerra and completed in 2011. Chiesanuova was historically known as Pennarossa before the administrative reforms of 1943–1944, when its name was officially changed. It was formally established as one of the nine castelli (administrative districts) of San Marino in the 1925 Regulation (No. 7, March 16, 1925). Before being officially recognized as a castello, it was considered in practice to be a ninth district in addition to the official eight districts established in 1945.

In the 2021 San Marino abortion referendum, Chiesanuova voted the most against the legalization of abortion up to 12 weeks, with the "No" vote at 27.05%. The "Yes" vote reached 72.95%.

== Geography ==
Chiesanuova borders the San Marino municipalities San Marino and Fiorentino and the Italian municipalities Sassofeltrio, Verucchio and San Leo. It contains seven curazie: Caladino, Confine, Galavotto, Molarini, Poggio Casalino, Poggio Chiesanuova, and Teglio.

=== Climate ===
Chiesanuova has a humid subtropical climate (Köppen: Cfa).

Climate data for Chiesanuova
Month	Jan	Feb	Mar	Apr	May	Jun	Jul	Aug	Sep	Oct	Nov	Dec	Year
Mean daily maximum °C (°F)	8.7 (47.7)	10.0 (50.0)	13.0 (55.4)	16.4 (61.5)	21.0 (69.8)	25.9 (78.6)	28.5 (83.3)	28.2 (82.8)	23.6 (74.5)	19.2 (66.6)	14.0 (57.2)	9.9 (49.8)	18.2 (64.8)
Daily mean °C (°F)	6.0 (42.8)	6.9 (44.4)	9.8 (49.6)	13.1 (55.6)	17.7 (63.9)	22.4 (72.3)	24.9 (76.8)	24.4 (75.9)	20.1 (68.2)	16.0 (60.8)	11.3 (52.3)	7.3 (45.1)	15.0 (59.0)
Mean daily minimum °C (°F)	3.7 (38.7)	4.2 (39.6)	6.7 (44.1)	9.8 (49.6)	14.2 (57.6)	18.6 (65.5)	20.9 (69.6)	20.7 (69.3)	16.8 (62.2)	13.2 (55.8)	9.0 (48.2)	5.0 (41.0)	11.9 (53.4)
Average precipitation mm (inches)	57.1 (2.25)	65.9 (2.59)	66.0 (2.60)	64.5 (2.54)	69.7 (2.74)	42.0 (1.65)	37.2 (1.46)	49.1 (1.93)	77.0 (3.03)	81.2 (3.20)	84.8 (3.34)	72.5 (2.85)	767 (30.18)
Source: Weather.Directory

== Governance ==
Chiesanuova, like all nine castelli of San Marino, operates under a local government system established by Law 22/1994 (as modified by Law 97/2002). The castello is governed by a Captain (Capitano di Castello) and a Castle Junta (Giunta di Castello) consisting of seven members, the standard number for San Marinese communities with fewer than 2,000 residents. The Captain serves as the highest local authority, representing Chiesanuova in official matters and presiding over the Junta's meetings. Among their duties, the Captain implements Junta decisions, maintains relationships with the national government, and participates in the urban planning commission for matters affecting Chiesanuova. In environmental emergencies, the Captain may request inspections from the environmental hygiene service.

The Junta functions as a deliberative body with significant local powers, including managing Chiesanuova's budget, coordinating cultural and recreational activities, overseeing public services, and protecting the castello's historical heritage and traditions. The Junta also has consultative powers regarding the national budget and can propose legislation to the Grand and General Council (San Marino's parliament).

Elections for both the Captain and Junta occur every five years through direct voting by Chiesanuova residents. Candidates for Captain must form electoral lists that include candidates for Junta positions, with each list requiring endorsement from at least 20 local voters. The electoral system uses a single ballot where voters select a Captain candidate and indicate preferences for two Junta member candidates. The list associated with the winning Captain typically receives a majority of Junta positions, with remaining seats distributed proportionally among other lists.

During its first meeting, the newly elected Junta appoints a secretary from among its members who records meeting minutes and can deputize for the Captain when necessary. All Junta members and the Captain must take an oath of allegiance to the Republic within sixty days of their election and enjoy immunity for opinions expressed during official meetings.
