= Fiorina (San Marino) =

Curazia of Domagnano, San Marino

- Curazia
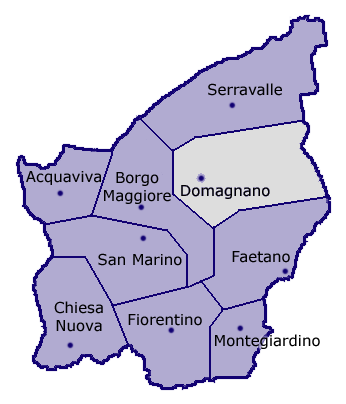
- Location of Domagnano within San Marino

- Location within San Marino
- Coordinates: 43°57′25.32″N 12°28′27.6″E
- Country: San Marino
- Castello: Domagnano
- Elevation: 357 m (1,171 ft)

Population (2003)
  - Total: 889
- Demonym: fiorinesi
- Time zone: UTC+1 (CET)
  - Summer (DST): UTC+2 (CEST)
- Postal code: 47895
- Area code: +378 (0549)

Fiorina is a curazia of San Marino, in the castello of Domagnano. Fiorella is the most populated curazia of Domagnano.

== Geography ==
The village is situated in the north of Domagnano, close to the municipality of Serravalle.
