= Subdivisions of San Marino =

First-level administrative divisions of San Marino

Castelli of San Marino
- Category: Municipality
- Location: San Marino
- Number: 9 (as of 2025)
- Populations: 1,004 (Montegiardino) – 11,226 (Serravalle)
- Government: Castle Council
- Subdivisions: Curazie of San Marino

The Republic of San Marino is divided into nine castelli (lit. 'castles'), which constitute its first-level administrative divisions. Each castello is governed by a Captain of the Castle (Italian: capitano di castello) and a Castle Council (giunta di castello), elected every five years.

Like Italian comuni, each castello has a capital (capoluogo), with other population centers sorted into curazie (equivalent to Italian frazioni). The country contains 44 curazie (sing. curazia), the lowest administrative unit beneath its castelli. Valdragone and Cailungo are divided into two curazie each, labelled di Sotto and di Sopra.

The Captain of the Castle performs functions broadly comparable to those of a mayor and serves as the head of the castello. Candidates must present an electoral list in accordance with the 1994 law and may not simultaneously serve as members of the Grand and General Council. The captain’s term of office is five years. The officeholder represents the castello and presides over and convenes the Castle Council, implements adopted resolutions, officiates civil marriage ceremonies, participates with voting rights in the urban planning commission, and assists citizens and local entities in administrative procedures before public offices.

Under Act No. 10 of 16 March 1925, the nine Captains of the Castle were appointed by the Grand and General Council. This system was reformed by Law No. 75 of 30 November 1979, which introduced the direct election of Captains of the Castle by universal suffrage. Newly elected captains take the oath of office at the Palazzo Pubblico in the City of San Marino before the Captains Regent. Since the 2020 local elections, foreign residents who have lived in San Marino for at least ten years have also been entitled to vote in elections for Captains of the Castle.

A law adopted in 2020 established the number of members of each Castle Council according to population size: six councillors in castelli with fewer than 2,500 inhabitants and eight councillors in those with 2,500 inhabitants or more. The councils perform functions broadly comparable to those of municipal councils in Italy and exercise deliberative, consultative, promotional, supervisory, and administrative responsibilities concerning local services within the territory and population of the castello.

== Castelli ==
Castello	Area (km^{2})	Population (January 2025)	Annexation	Councillors
Acquaviva	4.86	2,138	1243	6
Borgo Maggiore	9.01	6,953	12th century	8
Chiesanuova	5.46	1,191	1320	6
City of San Marino	7.09	4,118	301	8
Domagnano	6.62	3,617	1463	8
Faetano	7.75	1,188	1463	6
Fiorentino	6.56	2,607	1463	8
Montegiardino	3.31	1,004	1463	6
Serravalle	10.53	11,226	1463	8
Total	61.19	34,042		64

== Curazie ==
Castelli	Curazie
Acquaviva	Gualdicciolo; La Serra
Borgo Maggiore	Cà Melone; Cà Rigo; Cailungo; Cailungo di Sopra; Cailungo di Sotto; San Giovanni sotto la Penne; Valdragone; Valdragone di Sopra; Valdragone di Sotto; Ventoso
Chiesanuova	Caladino; Confine; Galavotto; Molarini; Poggio Casalino; Poggio Chiesanuova; Teglio
Città di San Marino	Cà Berlone; Canepa; Casole; Castellaro; Montalbo; Murata; Santa Mustiola
Domagnano	Cà Giannino; Fiorina; Piandivello; Spaccio Giannoni; Torraccia
Faetano	Cà Chiavello; Calligaria; Corianino; Monte Pulito
Fiorentino	Capanne; Crociale di Fiorentino; Pianacci
Montegiardino	Cerbaiola
Serravalle	Cà Ragni; Cinque Vie; Dogana; Falciano; Lesignano; Ponte Mellini; Rovereta; Valguirata

== See also ==
- ISO 3166-2:SM – the castelli constitute the principal subdivision for the International Organization for Standardization
