= San Marino =

Microstate in Southern Europe

Republic of San Marino Repubblica di San Marino (Italian) Ripóbblica d' San Marein (Romagnol)
- Flag Coat of arms
- Motto: Libertas (Latin) "Freedom"
- Anthem: Terra di Libertà "Land of Liberty"
- Location of San Marino (green) in Europe (dark grey)
- Capital: City of San Marino; 43°56′N 12°26′E
- Largest settlement: Dogana; 43°58′53″N 12°29′22″E
- Official languages: Italian
- Other languages: Romagnol (Sammarinese)
- Demonym: Sammarinese
- Government: Parliamentary diarchic directorial republic
  - Captains Regent: Gerardo Giovagnoli and William Casali
  - Secretary of State for Foreign and Political Affairs: Luca Beccari
- Legislature: Grand and General Council

Independence
  - From the Roman Empire: 3 September 301 (traditional)
  - From the Papal States: 1291
  - Constitution: 8 October 1600 (Statutes); 8 July 1974 (Declaration of Citizen Rights)

Area
  - Total: 61.19 km^{2} (23.63 sq mi) (191st)
  - Water (%): 0.0059%

Population
  - 2026 estimate: 33,605 (220th)
  - Density: 560/km^{2} (1,450.4/sq mi) (24th)
- GDP (PPP): 2024 estimate
  - Total: ▲$2.978 billion (176th)
  - Per capita: ▲$86,989 (12th)
- GDP (nominal): 2024 estimate
  - Total: ▲$2.034 billion (171st)
  - Per capita: ▲$59,405 (12th)
- HDI (2023): ▲0.915 very high (29th)
- Currency: Euro (€) (EUR)
- Time zone: UTC+01 (CET)
  - Summer (DST): UTC+02 (CEST)
- Calling code: +378 (+39 0549 calling via Italy)
- ISO 3166 code: SM
- Internet TLD: .sm
- Website https://gov.sm

San Marino, (Note: /ˌsæn məˈriːnoʊ/ SAN mə-REE-noh, Italian: [sam maˈriːno]; Romagnol: San Maréin or San Maroin; Latin: Sanctus Marinus) officially the Republic of San Marino, (Note: Italian: Repubblica di San Marino) is a landlocked country in Southern Europe, completely surrounded by Italy. Located on the northeastern slopes of the Apennine Mountains, it is the larger of two microstates within the Italian Peninsula, the other being Vatican City. San Marino is the fifth-smallest country in the world by area, with a land area of just over 61 km^{2} (24 sq mi). Its population was 34,042 as of 2025 and in 2026 dropped to 33,559. Its capital, the City of San Marino, sits atop Monte Titano, while its largest settlement is Dogana, in the municipality of Serravalle. San Marino claims to have been founded in AD 301 and to be the oldest extant sovereign state, and the oldest constitutional republic. It is named after Saint Marinus, a legendary stonemason from the Roman island of Rab (in present-day Croatia), who is said to have fled persecution under Emperor Diocletian to have established a monastic community on Monte Titano, where he built a small chapel. The country has a rare constitutional structure: the Grand and General Council, a democratically elected legislature, selects two heads of state, the Captains Regent, every six months. They are chosen from opposing political parties, and serve concurrently with equal powers and preside over several institutions of state, including the Grand and General Council. Only the Federal Council of Switzerland follows this same structure, except with some modifications due to its immensely larger size.

San Marino is a member of the Council of Europe and uses the euro as its official currency, but is not part of the European Union. The official language is Italian, although the traditional regiolect is Sammarinese, a dialect of Romagnol. Its economy is based on finance, industry, services, retail, and tourism, and it ranks among the wealthiest countries in the world by GDP (PPP) per capita. It hosts the Parliamentary Assembly of the Mediterranean. San Marino was also the first currently existing state to abolish the death penalty (in 1865), although it had not actually been used since the 1400s. In 2025, San Marino was ranked 29th on the Human Development Index.

== History ==
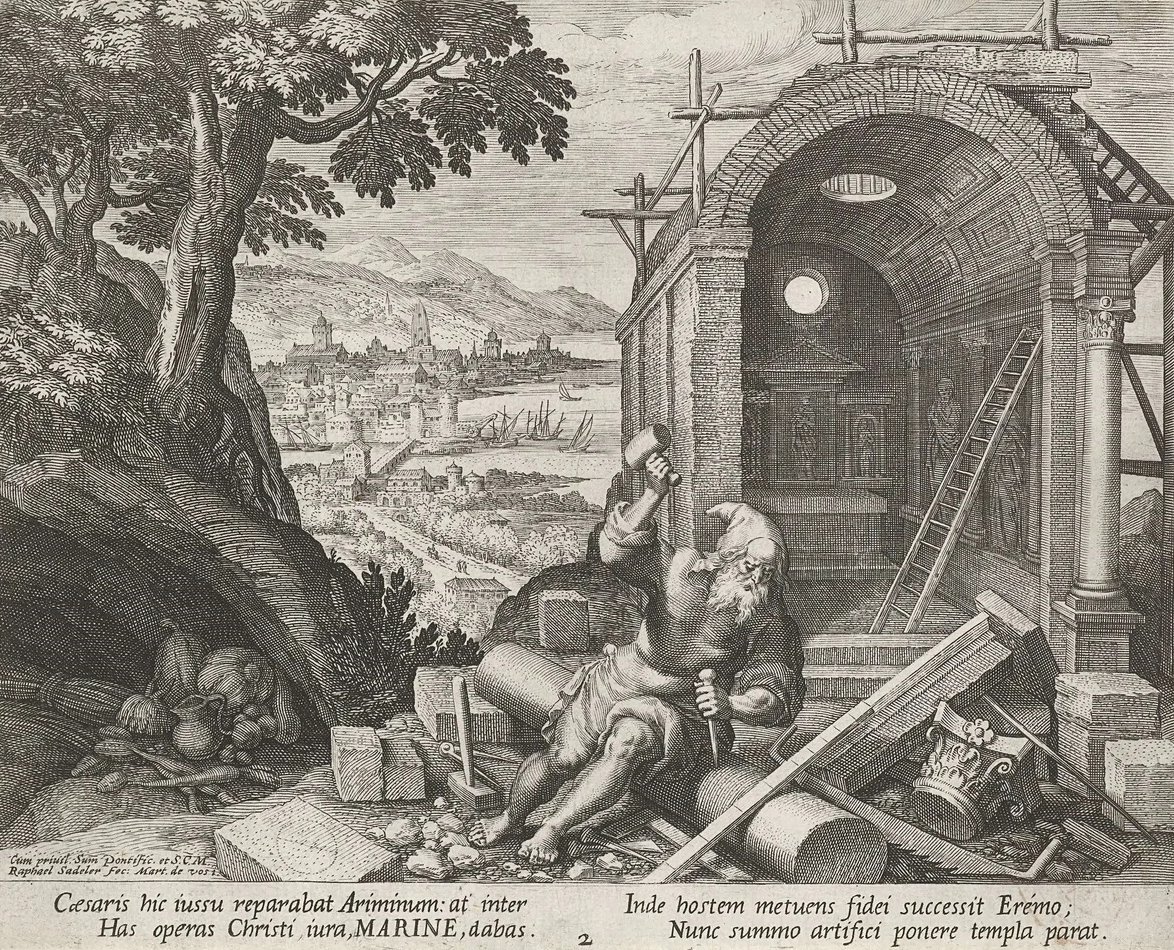
Illustration of Saint Marinus, the founder of the Republic of San Marino and prominent cultural figure

According to accounts that were first recorded centuries after he is suggested to have lived, Saint Marinus left the island of Rab in present-day Croatia with his lifelong friend Leo, and went to the city of Rimini as a stonemason. After the Diocletianic Persecution following his Christian sermons, he escaped to the nearby mountain Monte Titano, where he built a small church and thereby founded what is now the city and state of San Marino. According to William Miller, these accounts of the origin of San Marino "are a mixture of fables and miracles, but perhaps contain some grains of fact". The earliest historical evidence for a monastic community in San Marino dates to the 5th or 6th century AD, when a monk named Eugippus recorded that another monk had lived in a monastery in the area.

In 1291, San Marino appealed to the Bishop of Arezzo, Ildebrandino Guidi di Romena, against the contribution demands by the Vicario del Montefeltro. Jurist Palamede di Rimini decided in favour of San Marino and recognised its tax exemption from tributes demands of Montefeltro. In 1296, when Guglielmo Durante was the governor of Romagna, Sammarinesi appealed to Pope Boniface VIII against the further requests by the Montefeltro podestas regarding tributes. Abbot Ranieri di Sant'Anastasio was assigned to judge the dispute. A long process was held using various witnesses and sources to determine San Marino tax exemption status. The verdict was probably in favour of the autonomy of San Marino, as later the State did not pay taxes to the Montefeltro.

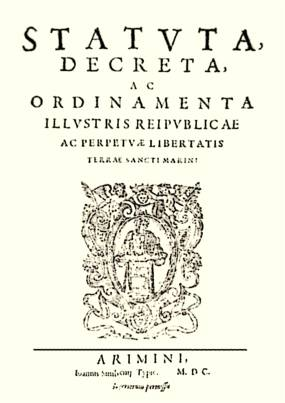
The Statutes of 1600 are a core part of the Sammarinese constitution

In 1320, the community of Chiesanuova chose to join the country. In 1463, San Marino was enlarged by the inclusion of the communities of Faetano, Fiorentino, Montegiardino, and Serravalle; since then, the country's borders have remained unchanged. In 1503, Cesare Borgia, the son of Pope Alexander VI, occupied the Republic for six months until his father's successor, Pope Julius II, intervened and restored the country's independence. On 4 June 1543, Fabiano di Monte San Savino, nephew of the later Pope Julius III, attempted to conquer the republic, but his infantry and cavalry failed as they got lost in a dense fog, which the Sammarinesi attributed to Saint Quirinus, whose feast day it was.

After the Duchy of Urbino was annexed by the Papal States in 1625, San Marino became surrounded by the papal states. This led to it seeking the formal protection of the Papal States in 1631, but this never amounted to a de facto Papal control of the republic. The country was occupied on 17 October 1739 by the legate (Papal governor) of Ravenna, Cardinal Giulio Alberoni, but independence was restored by Pope Clement XII on 5 February 1740, the feast day of Saint Agatha, after which she became a patron saint of the republic.

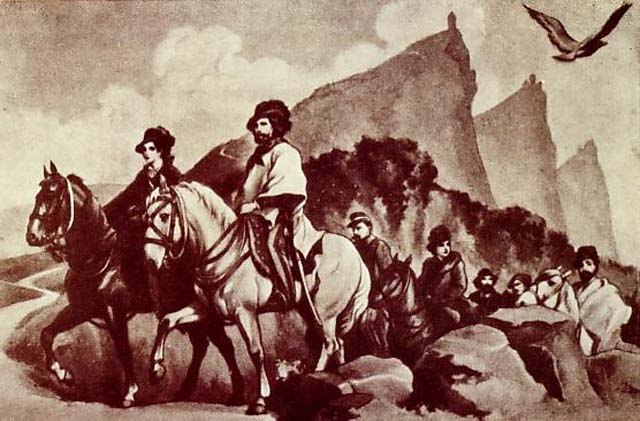
Anita and Giuseppe Garibaldi in San Marino, 1849

The advance of Napoleon's army in 1797 presented a brief threat to the independence of San Marino, but the country was saved from losing its liberty by one of its regents, Antonio Onofri, who managed to gain the respect and friendship of Napoleon. Due to Onofri's intervention, Napoleon promised in a letter to Gaspard Monge, a scientist and the commissary of the French Government for Science and Art, to guarantee and protect the independence of the Republic, even offering to extend its territory according to its needs. The offer was declined by the regents, fearing future retaliation from other states' revanchism.

During the later phase of the Italian unification process in the 19th century, San Marino served as a refuge for many people persecuted because of their support for unification, including Giuseppe Garibaldi and his wife Anita. Garibaldi allowed San Marino to remain independent. San Marino and the Kingdom of Italy signed a Convention of Friendship in 1862. The government of San Marino made United States President Abraham Lincoln an honorary citizen. He wrote in reply, saying that the republic proved that "government founded on republican principles is capable of being so administered as to be secure and enduring".

In March 1877, a new postal agreement allowed San Marino to issue the first stamps in representation of its own sovereignty, becoming a significant revenue source, showcasing national symbols like the Three Towers.

=== 20th century onwards ===
During World War I, when Italy declared war on Austria-Hungary on 24 May 1915, San Marino remained neutral and Italy adopted a hostile view of Sammarinese neutrality, suspecting that San Marino could harbour Austrian spies who could be given access to its new radiotelegraph station. Italy tried to forcibly establish a detachment of Carabinieri in the republic and then cut the republic's telephone lines when it did not acquiesce. Two groups of ten volunteers joined the Italian forces in the fighting on the Italian front, the first as combatants and the second as a medical corps operating a Red Cross field hospital. The existence of this hospital later caused Austria-Hungary to suspend diplomatic relations with San Marino.

After the war, San Marino suffered from high rates of unemployment and inflation, leading to increased tension between the lower and middle classes. The latter, fearing that the moderate government of San Marino would make concessions to the lower class majority, began to show support for the Sammarinese Fascist Party (Partito Fascista Sammarinese, PFS), founded in 1922, and styled largely on their Italian counterpart. PFS rule lasted from 1923 to 1943, and during this time they often sought support from Benito Mussolini's fascist government in Italy. During World War II, San Marino remained neutral, although it was wrongly reported in an article in The New York Times that it had declared war on the United Kingdom on 17 September 1940. The Sammarinese government later transmitted a message to the British government stating that they had not actually declared war.

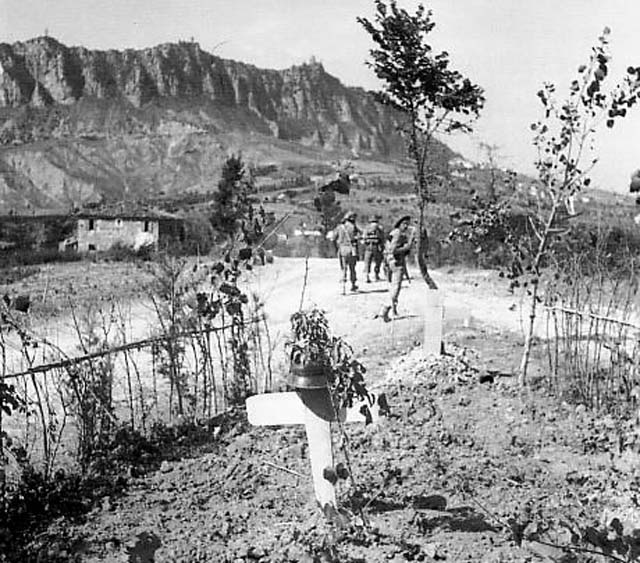
British troops at Monte Titano during the Battle of San Marino, September 1944

On 28 July 1943, three days after the fall of the Fascist regime in Italy, PFS rule collapsed and the new government declared neutrality in the conflict. The PFS regained power on 1 April 1944, but kept neutrality intact. On 26 June 1944, the bombing of San Marino happened. The country was bombed by four waves of Allied bombers under the incorrect belief that San Marino had been occupied by German forces and was being used to amass stores and ammunition. The Sammarinese government declared on the same day that no military installations or equipment were located on its territory, and that no belligerent forces had been allowed to enter. Nevertheless, smaller bombing raids continued until the 29th of August of that year, causing extensive damage to the city centre as well as the railway line connecting the country to nearby Rimini. San Marino accepted thousands of civilian refugees when Allied forces overran the Gothic Line. During World War II, San Marino temporarily became one of the most densely populated areas in Europe, as it provided refuge to approximately 100,000 people, primarily Italians fleeing nearby conflict, despite having a resident population of only around 15,000 at the time. In September 1944, it was briefly occupied by German forces, who were defeated by the Allies in the Battle of San Marino. Allied troops occupied San Marino for two months before departing.

San Marino had one of the world's earliest democratically elected communist-influenced governments, which was a coalition between the Sammarinese Communist Party and the Sammarinese Socialist Party that was in power between 1945 and 1957. (Note: The first fully communist government with executive power to be democratically elected is generally recognised as the 1957 Communist Party government in Kerala, India.) The coalition lost power following the Rovereta affair. San Marino became a member of the Council of Europe in 1988 and of the United Nations in 1992. It is not a member of the European Union, although it uses the euro as its currency (despite not legally being part of the Eurozone). Before the introduction of the euro, the country's currency was the Sammarinese lira.

== Geography ==
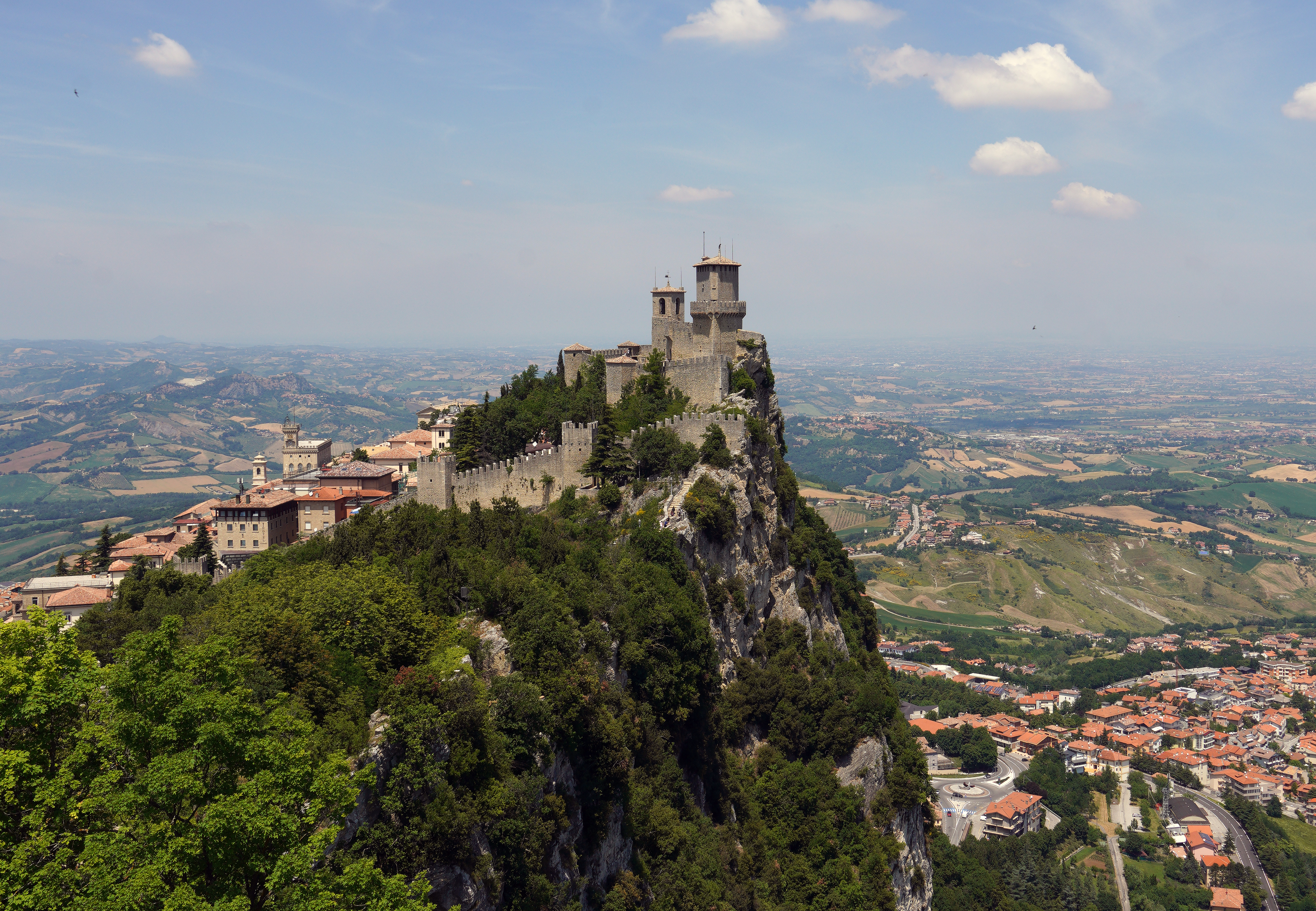
The fortress of Guaita on Monte Titano, a UNESCO recognized World Heritage Site.

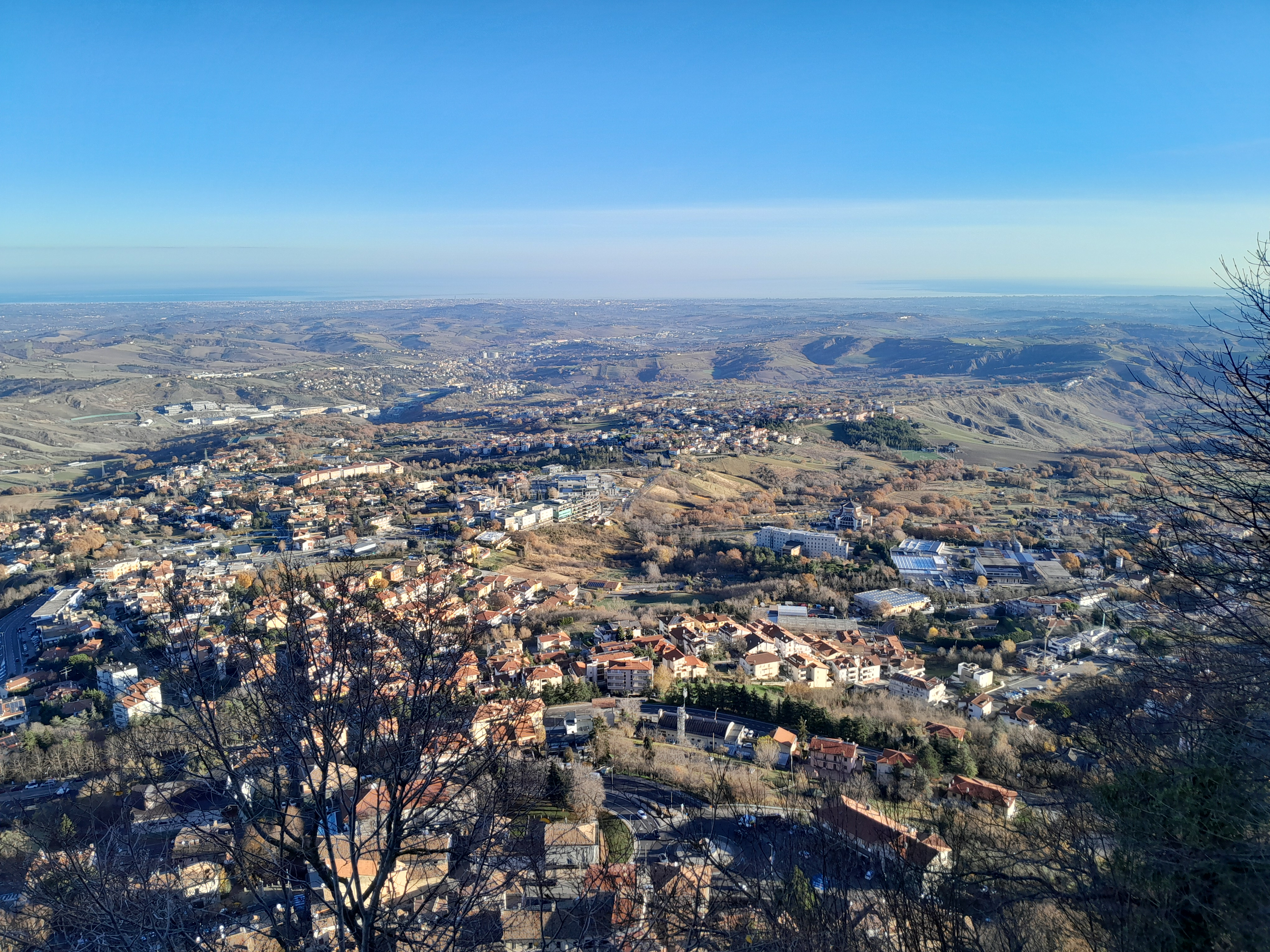
View from City of San Marino

San Marino is an enclave surrounded by Italy in Southern Europe, almost entirely bordered by the province of Rimini in the Emilia Romagna region. Only a stretch of about three kilometres in the south is bordered by the province of Pesaro and Urbino in the Marche region. Located approximately ten kilometres (six miles) from the Adriatic coast near Rimini, San Marino features hilly terrain with little naturally flat ground, as part of the Apennine mountain range. The highest point in the country, the summit of Monte Titano, reaches 749 m (2,457 ft) above sea level, while the lowest point, the Ausa River (which flows into the Marecchia), is at 55 m (180 ft). San Marino has no significant still or contained bodies of water. It is one of only three countries in the world to be completely surrounded by one other country. It is the third-smallest country in Europe (after Vatican City and Monaco), and the fifth-smallest country in the world. The terrestrial ecoregion of Italian sclerophyllous and semi-deciduous forests lies within San Marino's territory. The country had a 2019 Forest Landscape Integrity Index mean score of 0.01/10, ranking it last globally out of 172 countries.

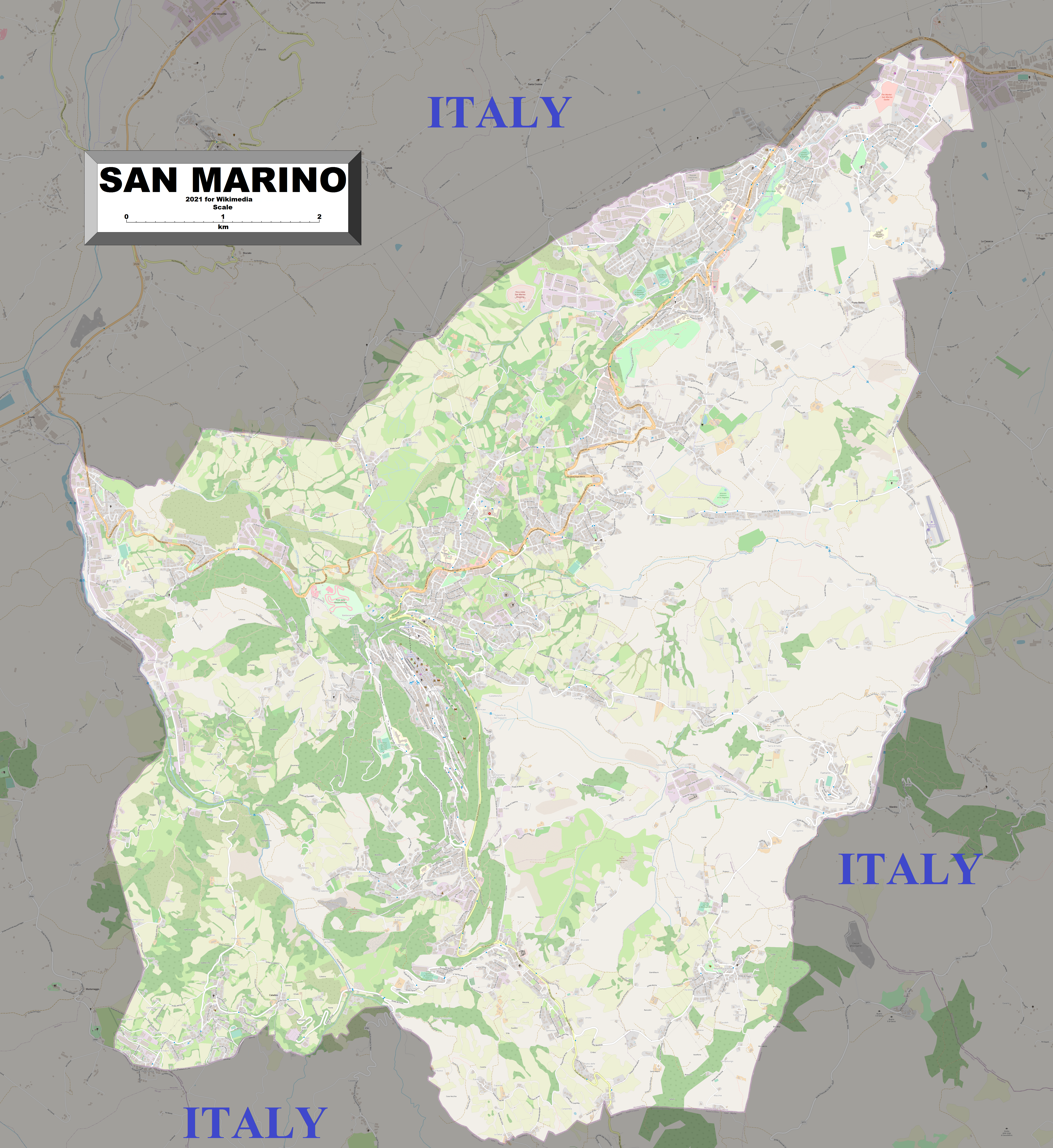
Enlargeable, detailed map of San Marino

=== Climate ===
San Marino has a humid subtropical climate (Köppen climate classification: Cfa), with some continental influences. It has warm-to-hot summers and cool winters, typical of inland areas of the central Italian Peninsula. Precipitation is scattered throughout the year with no real dry month. Snowfalls are common and heavy almost every winter, especially above 400–500 m (1,300–1,600 feet) of elevation.

Climate data for San Marino (2006–2023)
Month	Jan	Feb	Mar	Apr	May	Jun	Jul	Aug	Sep	Oct	Nov	Dec	Year
Record high °C (°F)	18.9 (66.0)	17.6 (63.7)	21.0 (69.8)	24.5 (76.1)	31.9 (89.4)	35.5 (95.9)	35.1 (95.2)	36.1 (97.0)	30.5 (86.9)	24.9 (76.8)	20.4 (68.7)	19.2 (66.6)	36.1 (97.0)
Mean daily maximum °C (°F)	6.4 (43.5)	7.0 (44.6)	10.2 (50.4)	15.0 (59.0)	19.6 (67.3)	25.0 (77.0)	27.4 (81.3)	26.1 (79.0)	20.6 (69.1)	15.6 (60.1)	10.8 (51.4)	7.4 (45.3)	15.9 (60.7)
Daily mean °C (°F)	4.2 (39.6)	4.7 (40.5)	7.3 (45.1)	11.6 (52.9)	15.7 (60.3)	20.8 (69.4)	23.5 (74.3)	22.5 (72.5)	17.5 (63.5)	13.0 (55.4)	8.6 (47.5)	5.2 (41.4)	12.9 (55.2)
Mean daily minimum °C (°F)	2.1 (35.8)	2.5 (36.5)	4.8 (40.6)	8.5 (47.3)	12.4 (54.3)	17.3 (63.1)	19.7 (67.5)	19.2 (66.6)	14.9 (58.8)	10.9 (51.6)	6.7 (44.1)	3.2 (37.8)	10.2 (50.3)
Record low °C (°F)	−6.5 (20.3)	−10.2 (13.6)	−5.9 (21.4)	−2.3 (27.9)	1.3 (34.3)	8.8 (47.8)	10.0 (50.0)	10.8 (51.4)	5.8 (42.4)	0.9 (33.6)	−2.8 (27.0)	−7.5 (18.5)	−10.2 (13.6)
Average precipitation mm (inches)	50.2 (1.98)	63.9 (2.52)	64.5 (2.54)	59.4 (2.34)	70.3 (2.77)	54.3 (2.14)	40.4 (1.59)	40.7 (1.60)	75.3 (2.96)	70.2 (2.76)	99.0 (3.90)	61.4 (2.42)	749.5 (29.51)
Average precipitation days (≥ 1.0 mm)	7.2	8.4	8.3	7.9	8.6	4.8	4.3	4.5	6.8	7.1	10.2	8.3	86.3
Source: Arpae Emilia-Romagna

== Government and politics ==
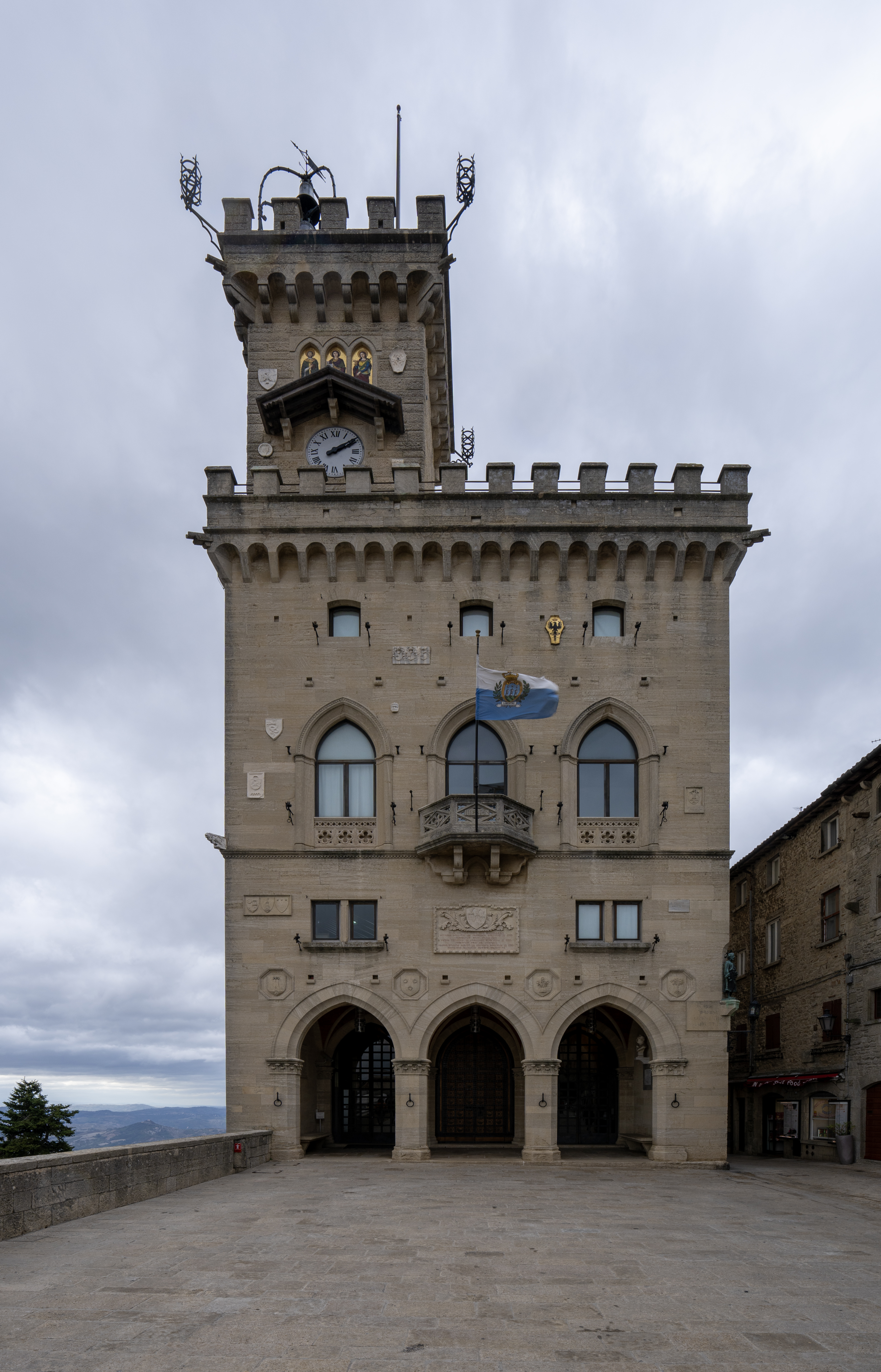
The Palazzo Pubblico, seat of the government of San Marino

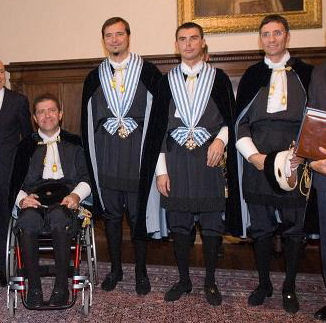
Four former captains regent: from left to right, Mirko Tomassoni, Alessandro Rossi, Alessandro Mancini, and Alberto Selva

San Marino has the political framework of a parliamentary representative democratic republic; the captains regent are heads of state, and there is a pluriform multi-party system. Executive power is exercised by the government. Although there is no formal head of government, the secretary for foreign and political affairs is in many ways equal to the prime minister in other countries. Legislative power is vested in both the government and the Grand and General Council. The judiciary is independent of the executive and the legislature. San Marino is considered to have the earliest-written governing documents still in effect, as the Statutes of 1600 are still at the core of its constitutional framework.

San Marino was originally led by the Arengo, initially formed from the heads of each family. In the 13th century, power was given to the Grand and General Council. In 1243, the first two captains regent were nominated by the council. Still today, Captains Regent are elected every six months by the council. The legislature of the republic is the Grand and General Council (Consiglio grande e generale). The council is a unicameral legislature with 60 members. There are elections every five years by proportional representation in all nine administrative districts. These districts (townships) correspond to the old parishes of the republic. All citizens 18 years or older are eligible to vote.

Besides general legislation, the Grand and General Council approves the budget and elects the captains regent, the Congress of State (composed of ten secretaries of state with executive power), the Council of Twelve, the Advising Commissions, and the Government Unions. The council also has the power to ratify treaties with other countries. The council is divided into five different Advising Commissions consisting of fifteen councilors who examine, propose, and discuss the implementation of new laws that are on their way to being presented on the floor of the council.

Every six months, the council elects two captains regent to be the heads of state. The captains are chosen from opposing parties so that there is a balance of power. They serve a six-month term. The investiture of the captains regent takes place on 1 April and 1 October in every year. Once this term is over, citizens have three days in which to file complaints about the captains' activities. If they warrant it, judicial proceedings against the ex-head(s) of state can be initiated.

The practice of having two heads of state chosen in frequent elections is derived directly from the customs of the Roman Republic. The council is equivalent to the Roman Senate; the captains regent, to the consuls of ancient Rome. It is thought the inhabitants of the area came together as Roman rule collapsed to form a rudimentary government for their own protection from foreign rule.

San Marino is a multi-party democratic republic. A new election law in 2008 raised the threshold for small parties entering Parliament, causing political parties to organise themselves into two alliances: the right-wing Pact for San Marino, led by the Sammarinese Christian Democratic Party; and the left-wing Reforms and Freedom, led by the Party of Socialists and Democrats, a merger of the Socialist Party of San Marino and the former communist Party of Democrats. The 2008 general election was won by the Pact for San Marino with 35 seats in the Grand and General Council against the Reforms and Freedom party's 25.

On 1 October 2007, Mirko Tomassoni was elected as captain regent, making him the first person with disability elected to that office. San Marino has had more female heads of state than any other country: 15 as of October 2014, including three who served twice. On 1 April 2022, 58-year-old Paolo Rondelli was elected as one of the two captains regent. He had previously been the Ambassador to the United States and is the world's first openly gay head of state.

=== Administrative divisions ===
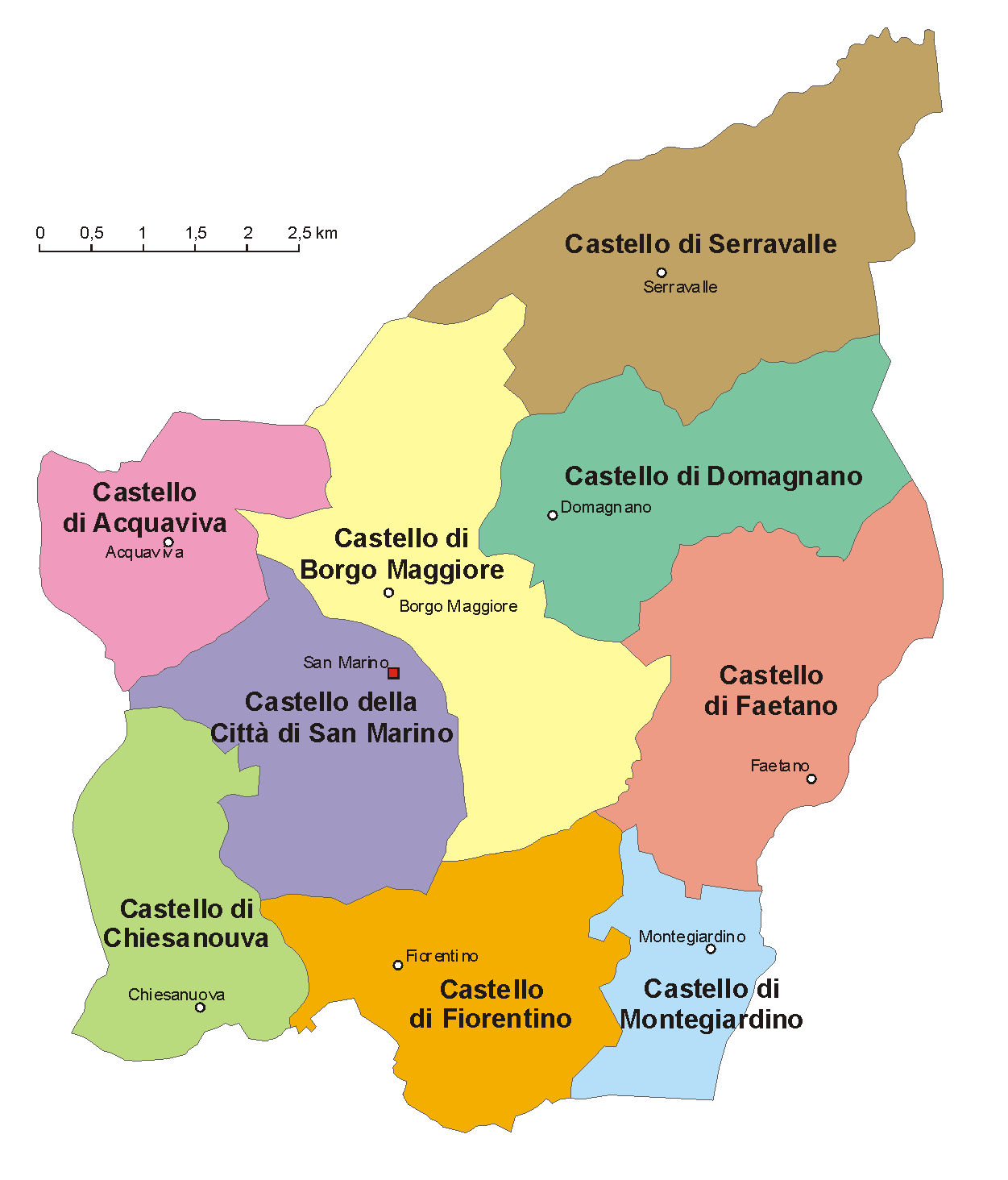
Castelli of San Marino

San Marino is geographically divided into nine castelli (lit. 'castles', equivalent to a municipality), each of which contains a capital (capoluogo), with other population centres sorted into curazie (equivalent to Italian frazioni). Each castello is led by a Castle Captain (Italian: Capitano di Castello) and a Castle Council (Giunta di Castello), elected every five years. The nine castelli are the City of San Marino, which is San Marino's capital city, Acquaviva, Borgo Maggiore, Chiesanuova, Domagnano, Faetano, Fiorentino, Montegiardino, and Serravalle.

San Marino's 44 curazie are Cà Berlone, Cà Chiavello, Cà Giannino, Cà Melone, Cà Ragni, Cà Rigo, Cailungo (di Sopra and di Sotto), Caladino, Calligaria, Canepa, Capanne, Casole, Castellaro, Cerbaiola, Cinque Vie, Confine, Corianino, Crociale, Dogana, Falciano, Fiorina, Galavotto, Gualdicciolo, La Serra, Lesignano, Molarini, Montalbo, Monte Pulito, Murata, Pianacci, Piandivello, Poggio Casalino, Poggio Chiesanuova, Ponte Mellini, Rovereta, San Giovanni sotto le Penne, Santa Mustiola, Spaccio Giannoni, Teglio, Torraccia, Valdragone (di Sopra and di Sotto), Valgiurata, and Ventoso.

=== Military ===
San Marino's military forces are among the smallest in the world. National defence is, by arrangement, the responsibility of Italy's armed forces. Different branches have varied functions, including performing ceremonial duties, patrolling borders, mounting guard at government buildings, and assisting police in major criminal cases. The police are not included in the military of San Marino.

==== Crossbow Corps ====
Once at the heart of San Marino's army, the Crossbow Corps is now a ceremonial force of approximately 80 volunteers. Since 1295, the Crossbow Corps has provided demonstrations of crossbow shooting at festivals. Its uniform design is medieval. While still a statutory military unit, the Crossbow Corps has no military function today.

==== Guard of the Rock ====
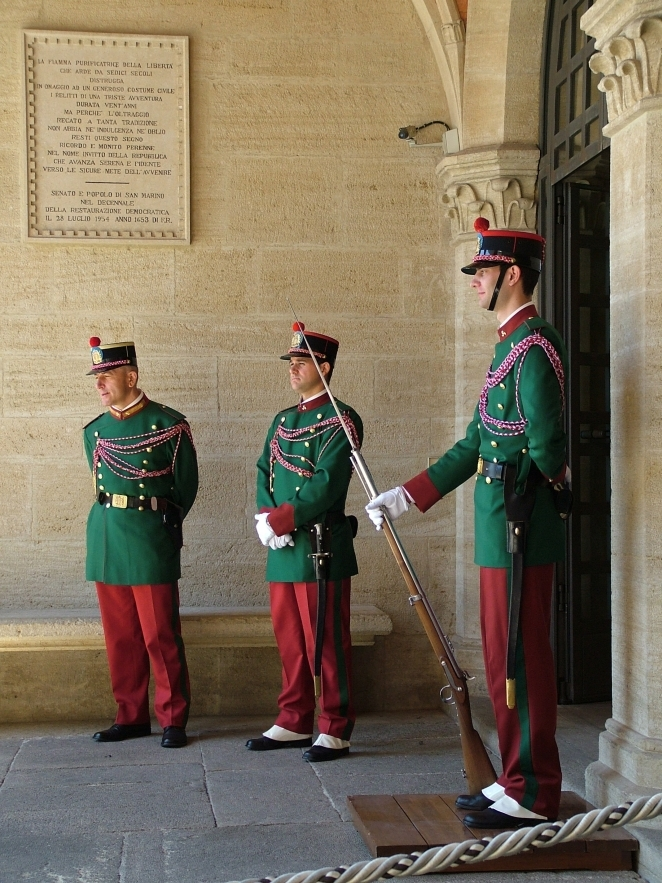
Guards of the Rock

The Guard of the Rock is a front-line military unit in the San Marino armed forces, a state border patrol, with responsibility for patrolling borders and defending them. In their role as Fortress Guards they are responsible for guarding the Palazzo Pubblico in San Marino City, the seat of national government. In this role they are the forces most visible to tourists and are known for their colourful ceremony of Changing the Guard. Under the 1987 statute the Guard of the Rock are all enrolled as "Criminal Police Officers" (in addition to their military role) and assist the police in investigating major crime. The uniform of the Guard of the Rock is a distinctive red and green.

==== Guard of the Grand and General Council ====
The Guard of the Grand and General Council commonly known as The Guard of the council or locally as the "Guard of Nobles", formed in 1741, is a volunteer unit with ceremonial duties. Due to its striking blue, white, and gold uniform, it is perhaps the best-known part of the Sammarinese military, and appears on countless postcard views of the republic. The functions of the Guard of the council are to protect the captains regent, and to defend the Grand and General Council during its formal sessions. They also act as ceremonial bodyguards to government officials at both state and church festivals.

==== Company of Uniformed Militia ====
In former times, all families with two or more adult male members were required to enroll half of them in the Company of Uniformed Militia. This unit remains the basic fighting force of the armed forces of San Marino, but is largely ceremonial. It is a matter of civic pride for many Sammarinese to belong to the force, and all citizens with at least six years' residence in the republic are entitled to enroll. The uniform is dark blue, with a kepi bearing a blue and white plume. The ceremonial form of the uniform includes a white cross-strap, and white and blue sash, white epaulets, and white decorated cuffs.

==== Military Ensemble ====
Formally this is part of the Army Militia, and is the ceremonial military band of San Marino. It consists of approximately 60 musicians. The uniform is similar to that of the Army Militia. Military Ensemble music accompanies most state occasions in the republic.

==== Gendarmerie ====
Established in 1842, the Gendarmerie of San Marino is a militarised law enforcement agency. Its members are full-time and have responsibility for the protection of citizens and property, and the preservation of law and order. The entire military corps of San Marino depends upon the co-operation of full-time forces and their retained (volunteer) colleagues, known as the Corpi Militari Volontari, or Voluntary Military Force. The local law enforcement personnel are supported by Interpol. The Interpol support focuses on organized crime and terrorism. The Interpol offices are located in the Headquarters of the Gendarmerie.

== Economy ==
Exports of San Marino by product category (2019) Chemical products Transportation Machines Mineral products Plastics and rubbers Metals Foodstuffs Precious metals Textiles Instruments Animal products Vegetable products Paper goods Footwear and headwear Miscellaneous Stone and glass Wood products Animal and vegetable bi-products Animal hides Arts and antiques Weapons

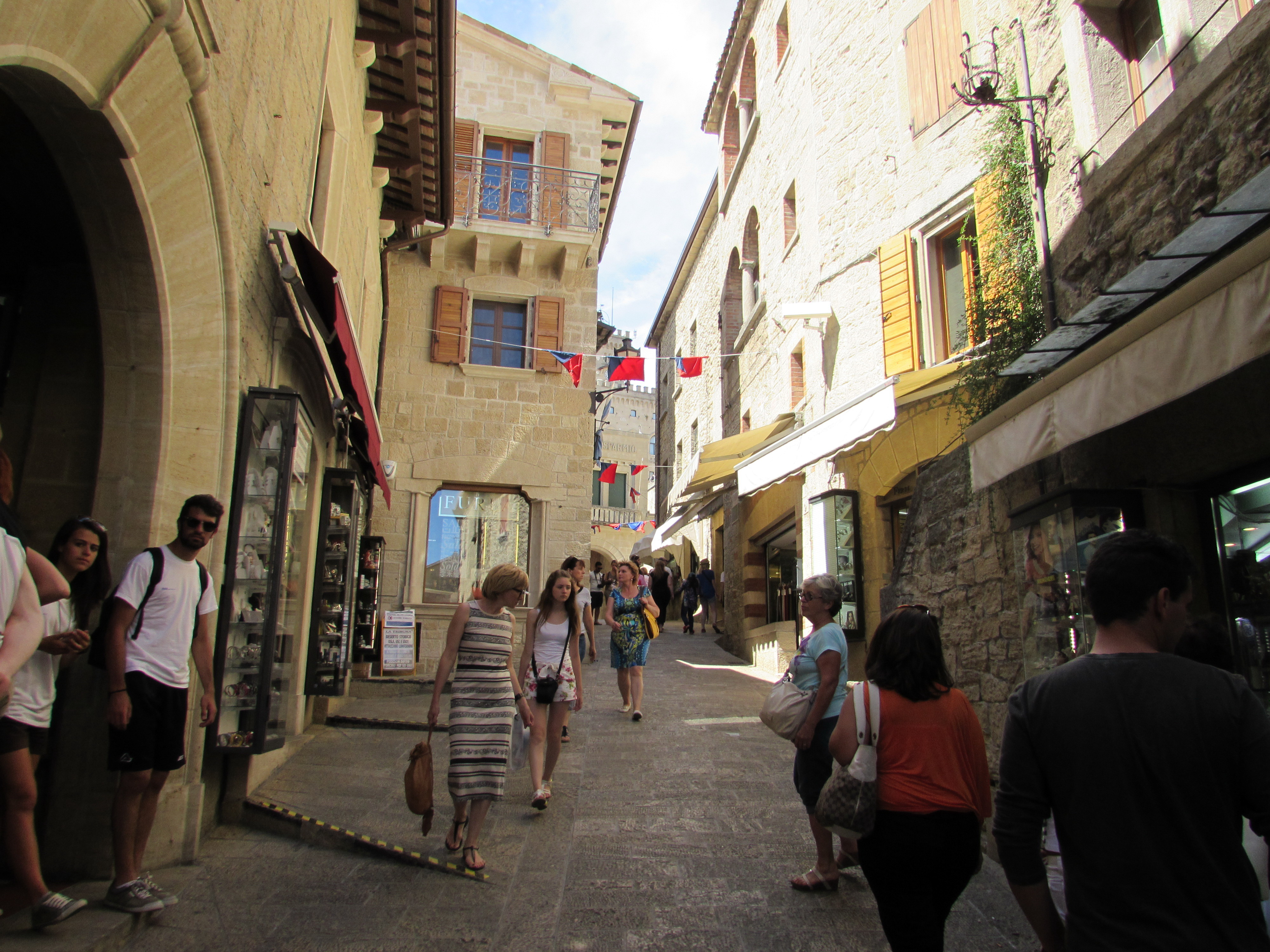
Tourism and banking are the country's main sources of revenue.

San Marino is a developed country, and although it is not a European Union member it is allowed to use the euro as its currency by arrangement with the Council of the European Union; it is also granted the right to use its own designs on the national side of the Euro coins. It is one of six sovereign nations that use the Euro but are not part of the EU. The other nations are Kosovo, Monaco, Andorra, Vatican City, and Montenegro. Before the euro, the Sammarinese lira was pegged to, and exchangeable with, the Italian lira. The small number of Sammarinese euro coins, as was the case with the lira before it, are of interest to coin collectors. San Marino's GDP per capita and standard of living are comparable to that of neighboring Italy. Key industries include banking, electronics, and ceramics. The main agricultural products are wine and cheese. San Marino imports staple goods, mainly from Italy.

San Marino's postage stamps, which are valid for mail posted in the country, are mostly sold to philatelists and are a significant source of income. San Marino is no longer a member of the Small European Postal Administration Cooperation. It has the world's highest rate of car ownership, being one of only a handful of countries with more vehicles than people. The average is 1.6 cars per person, which includes children.

=== Conventions with Italy ===
San Marino and Italy have engaged in conventions since 1862, dictating some economic activities in San Marino's territory. Cultivation of tobacco and production of goods which are subject to Italy's government monopoly are forbidden in San Marino. Direct import is forbidden; all goods coming from a third country have to travel through Italy before reaching the country. Although it is allowed to print its own postal stamps, San Marino is not allowed to coin its own currency and is obliged to use Italy's mint; the agreement does not affect the right of the Republic of San Marino to continue to issue gold coins denominated in Scudi (the legal value of 1 gold Scudo is 37.50 euros). Gambling is legal and regulated; however, casinos were outlawed prior to 2007. There is one legally operating casino.

In exchange for these limitations, Italy provides San Marino with an annual stipend, provided at cost, of sea salt (not more than 250 tonnes per year), tobacco (40 tonnes), cigarettes (20 tonnes) and matches (unlimited number). At the border there are no formalities with Italy. However, at the tourist office visitors can purchase officially cancelled souvenir stamps for their passports.

=== Taxation ===
San Marino offers a competitive tax environment designed to attract investment and support economic development. The standard corporate income tax (Imposta Generale sui Redditi, IGR) rate is 17%. However, new businesses benefit from a reduced rate of 8.5% for the first five years of operation, provided they meet specific employment criteria, such as hiring at least one employee within six months and a second within 24 months of starting operations. Innovative startups participating in San Marino's innovation programmes are eligible for further tax incentives:

- 0% corporate tax for the first three years.
- 4% for the subsequent four years.
- 8% for the following five years.

San Marino employs a progressive personal income tax system, with rates ranging from 9% to 35%:

- 9% for income up to €10,000.
- 13% for income between €10,001 and €25,000.
- 35% for income above €25,000.

The personal income tax was introduced in 1984 and underwent significant reforms in 2013 to enhance fiscal revenue. San Marino imposes withholding taxes on various forms of income:

- 5% on dividends paid to individuals.
- 13% on interest payments.
- 20% on royalties paid to non-residents.

San Marino does not implement a traditional value-added tax (VAT) system. Instead, it applies a single-stage import tax known as "imposta monofase," levied at a standard rate of 17% on the importation cost of goods. This tax is applied only once at the point of importation and does not extend to services. Under the customs union agreement with the European Union, this import tax is considered equivalent to the EU's VAT system.

To encourage investment, San Marino offers several tax incentives:

- Dividends received by non-resident companies are 95% exempt from taxation, provided the participation has been held continuously for at least twelve months.
- Investments in capital goods or real estate can lead to a reduction in taxable income by up to 90%.

Because San Marino's tax rate is lower than surrounding Italy's, many businesses choose to be based in San Marino to avoid the higher rates. San Marino boasts a corporate rate 14.5% lower than Italy (23%) and 12.5% lower than the EU average (21.3%). This has made San Marino the tax haven of choice for many wealthy Italians and businesses.

=== Tourism ===
The tourism sector contributes over 22% of San Marino's GDP, with approximately 2 million tourists having visited in 2014. On average tourists spend about 2 nights in the republic making on average a tourist present per 3 residents at any given time.

== Transport ==
The Azienda Autonoma di Stato per i Servizi Pubblici, the Sammarinese state company for public transport, operates the country's bus network and aerial cablecar system.

=== Road ===
The main road is the San Marino Highway, a dual carriageway which runs between Borgo Maggiore and Dogana through Domagnano and Serravalle. After crossing the international border at Dogana, the highway continues through Italy as the SS72 state road, touching the international border at Rovereta. It serves Cerasolo, a frazione of Coriano, and the Rimini Sud exit of the A14 tolled highway, before terminating at the crossroads with the SS16 state road. Several taxi companies operate in San Marino.

=== Buses and coaches ===
As of December 2023, eight bus routes operate entirely within San Marino. All but one line starts in the City of San Marino, with several lines serving Borgo Maggiore, Domagnano, Serravalle, Dogana, and San Marino Hospital. Start Romagna SpA operates several routes that run entirely in Italian territory but near the Sammarinese border, providing connections to Rimini, Verucchio, and Novafeltria. Rimini and San Marino are connected by the coach companies Bonelli and Benedettini, which provide several services per day throughout the year. In the City of San Marino, the coaches depart from the central bus stop in Piazzale Marino Calcigni, then stop in Borgo Maggiore, Domagnano, Serravalle, Dogana, and Cerasolo, a frazione of Coriano, before reaching Rimini's Arch of Augustus and railway station. The coaches complete the route in approximately fifty minutes.

=== Aerial cablecar system ===
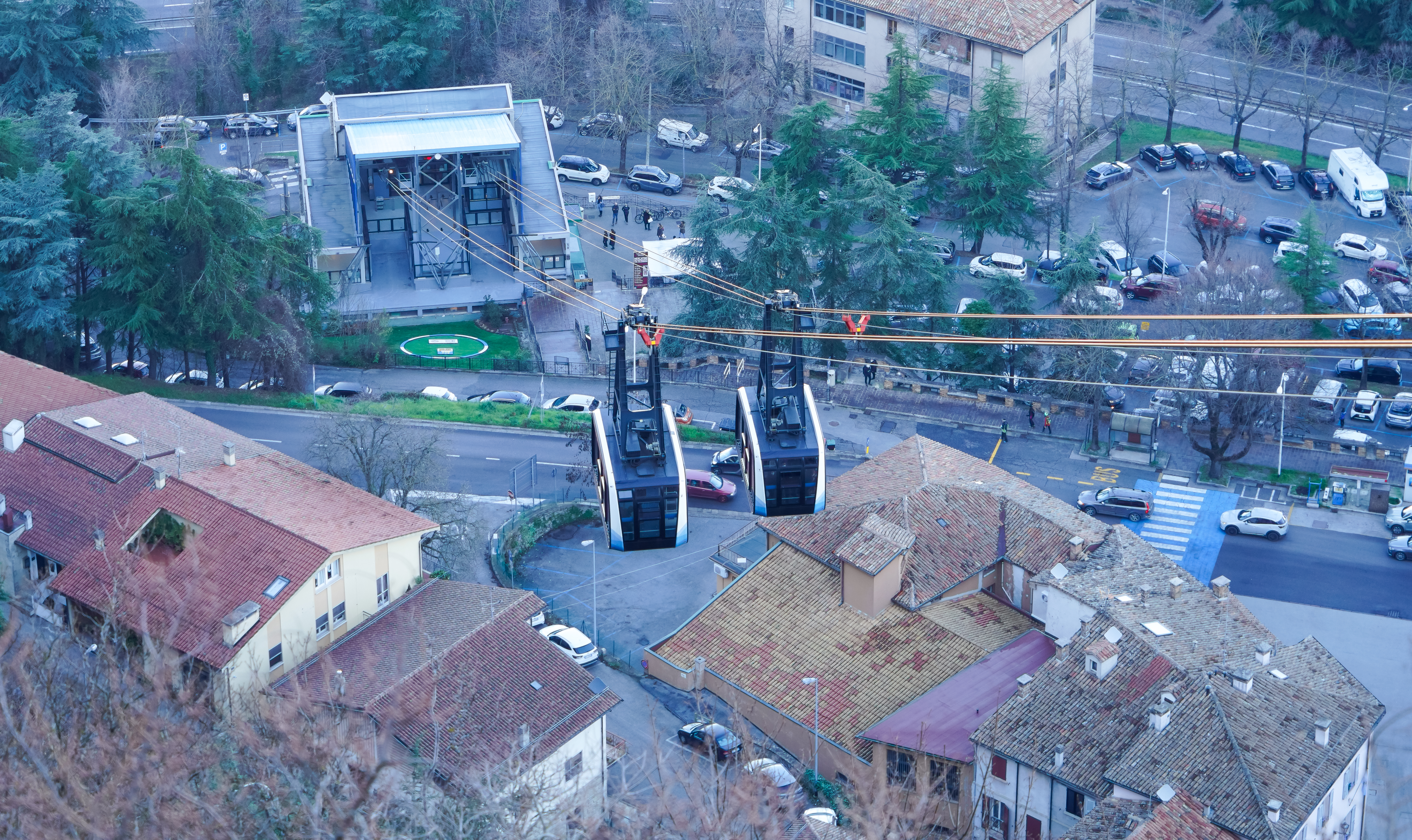
A cablecar overlooks Borgo Maggiore in April 2022.

The Funivia di San Marino is an aerial cablecar system connecting a lower terminus in Borgo Maggiore to an upper terminus in the City of San Marino. Running every fifteen minutes, the two-minute ride is renowned for its panoramic views over San Marino, the Province of Rimini, and the Adriatic Sea. The cablecar system is a major tourist attraction, and considered a defining symbol of San Marino. The cablecar system transports 500,000 passengers yearly across approximately 21,000 trips. It was inaugurated on 1 August 1959. In 1995 and 1996, it was modernised with double load-bearing cables built by Doppelmayr Italia, and further renovated in spring 2017.

=== Aviation ===
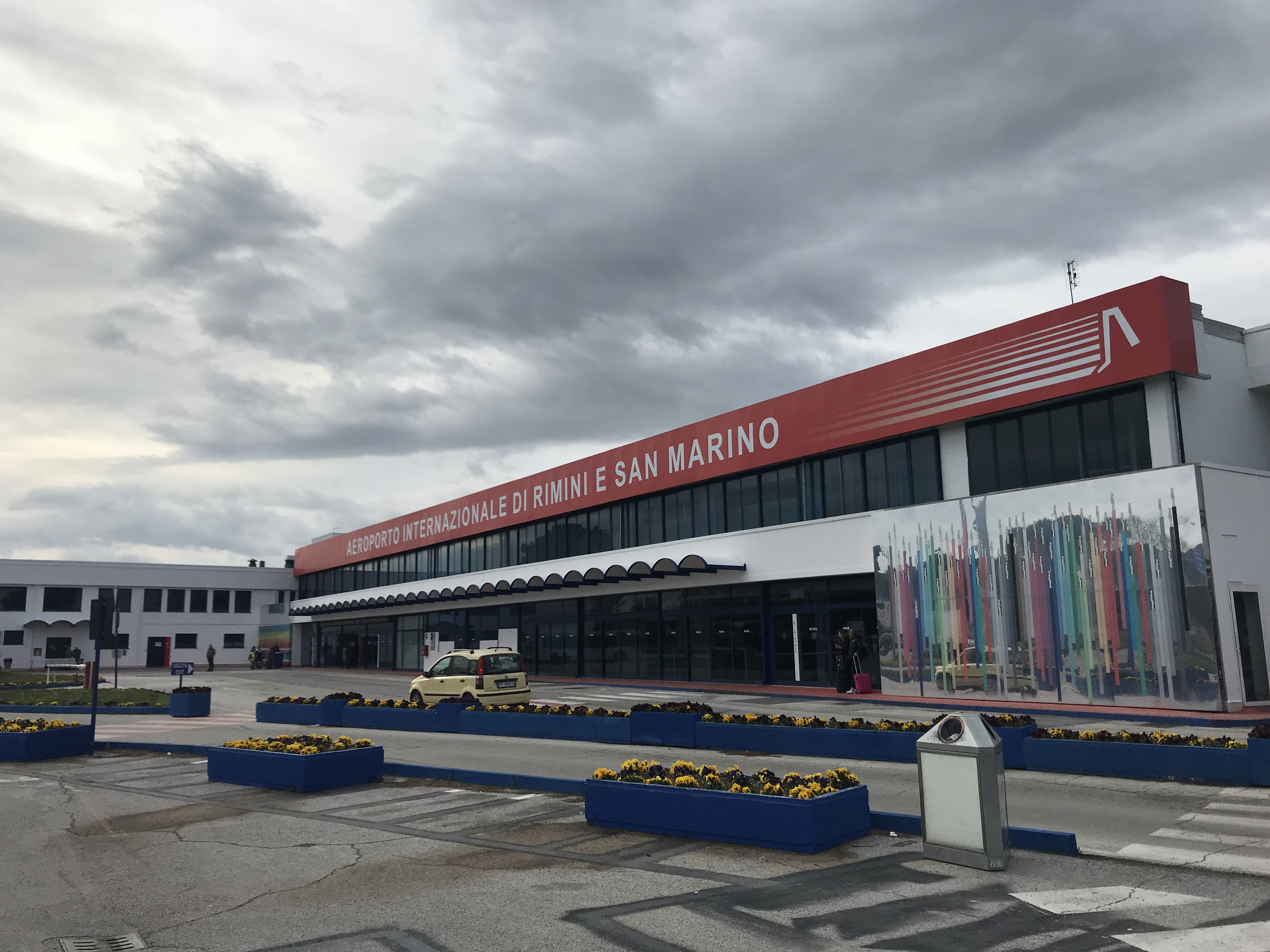
The terminal of Fellini Airport in March 2018, since its repainting

The closest airports to San Marino are Federico Fellini Airport in Rimini's frazione of Miramare, Luigi Ridolfi Airport in Forlì, Raffaello Sanzio Airport in Ancona, and Guglielmo Marconi Airport in Bologna. Since the 1980s, the governments of San Marino and Italy have signed several bilateral agreements concerning San Marino's access to Fellini Airport. After the Sammarinese government acquired a 3% stake in Fellini Airport's management company, Aeradria, in 2002, the airport was officially named Rimini-San Marino Airport.

In June 2018, Ariminum, Aeradria's successor as Fellini Airport's management company, repainted the airport terminal to read Aeroporto Internazionale di Rimini e San Marino (Rimini and San Marino International Airport), replacing the previous Aeroporto Internazionale Federico Fellini (Federico Fellini International Airport). The most significant bilateral agreement, ratified on 16 September 2013, provided San Marino a forty-year concession over some areas of Fellini Airport. The areas were expected to host a private terminal, with a customs border allowing goods destined for San Marino not to pass through Italian customs. As of August 2023, Sammarinese authorities still have no presence at the airport.

Torraccia Airfield is San Marino's only aviation facility. It is a small general aviation aerodrome in Torraccia, a village east of the castello of Domagnano, less than 200 metres (660 feet) from the Italian border. Torraccia's only grass runway was first used in 1981, but the airfield's structure was opened in 1985. In July 2012, the runway was extended to 650 metres (2,130 feet). The airfield is owned and operated by Aeroclub San Marino, a flying club with approximately 100 members. In the summer, between ten and fifteen planes typically land at the airfield per day. The airfield hosts a flight school, recreational flights and sports, and some tourist flights in small aircraft.

At the site of the present-day parking lot for the Funivia's Borgo Maggiore terminus was a heliport, which inaugurated its first flights in September 1950. On 30 June 1959, a helicopter line running between Borgo Maggiore and a heliport by Rimini's port was inaugurated. Operated by Compagnia Italiana Elicotteri, the service ran several times per day, using a fleet of four-seater Bell 47J Rangers and a three-seater Agusta-Bell AB-47G, which were serviced at Rimini's airport. In 1964, the line was extended to San Leo. Tickets would cost up to 12,500 lire, including the cablecar to the City of San Marino and a shuttle to the Leonine fortress. The service would take fifteen minutes to reach Rimini and ten minutes to reach San Leo. The service closed in 1969.

=== Railway ===
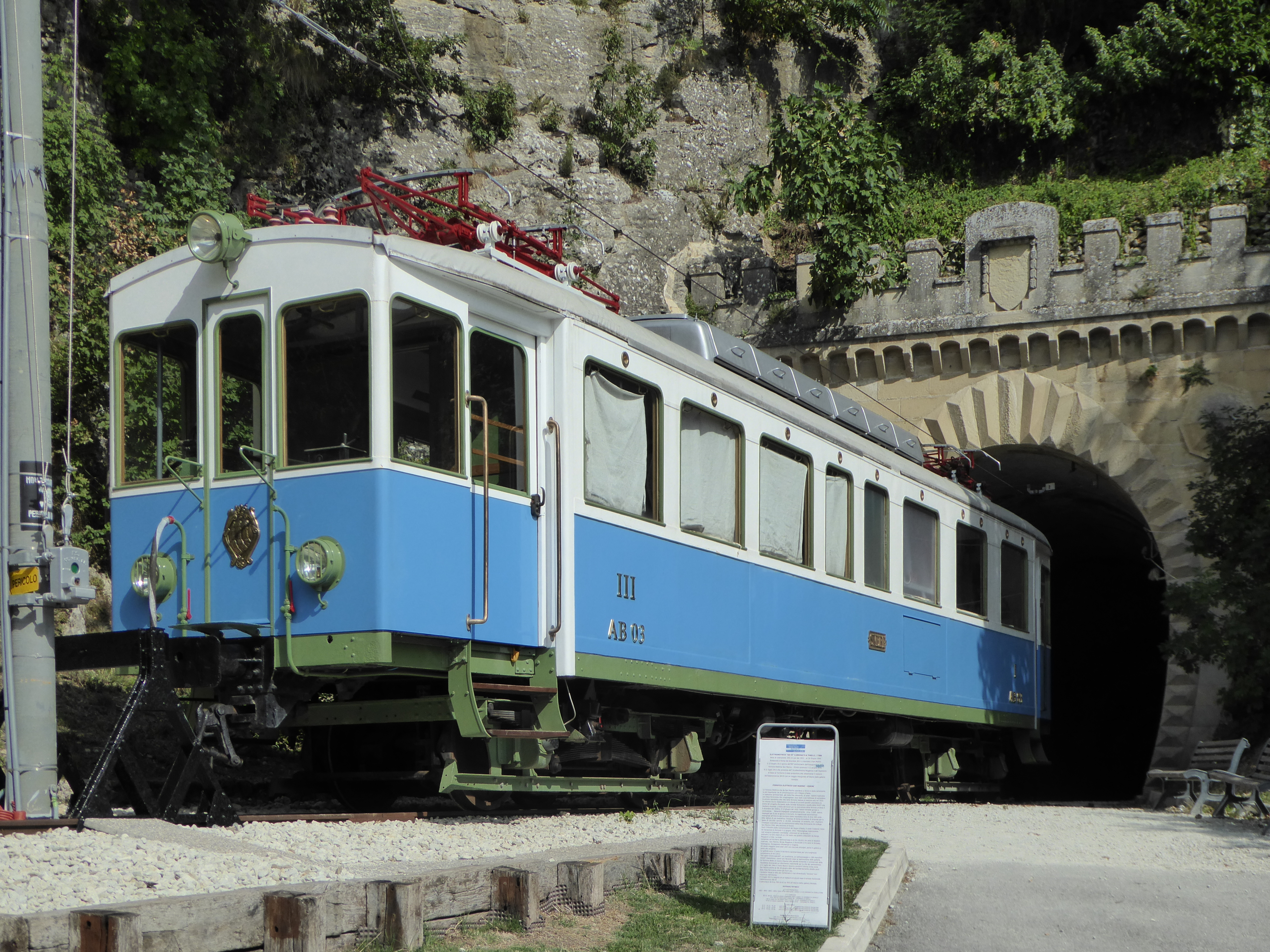
The restored AB-03 locomotive and a reactivated section of the Rimini–San Marino railway, opened in the City of San Marino

San Marino has no railway except an 800-metre (1/2-mile) heritage railway, which opened in 2012. Between 1932 and 1944, a 31.5-kilometre (19.6-mile) electrified narrow gauge railway operated between Rimini and the City of San Marino, serving Dogana, Serravalle, Domagnano, and Borgo Maggiore along its route. During the Second World War, the line was bombed and closed, after which its tunnels sheltered refugees during the Battles of Rimini and San Marino. After the war, the railway was abandoned in favour of the San Marino Highway. In 2012, an 800-metre (1/2-mile) section was reopened as a heritage railway in the City of San Marino, running between Piazzale della Stazione and near Via Napoleone. The restored section comprises the original railway's final horseshoe turn through the 502-metre (1,647-foot) Montale tunnel.

Despite its short operational history, the Rimini–San Marino railway retains an important place in Sammarinese culture and history, and has featured on Sammarinese postal stamps. Both the Sammarinese and Italian governments have expressed interest in reopening the line. Between 1921 and 1960, San Marino was also served by a station on the Rimini–Novafeltria railway in Torello, on the other side of the international border from Gualdicciolo in San Marino's west. This provided San Marino its first railway station, albeit located in Italian territory.

== Demographics ==
As of September 2023, San Marino is estimated to number 33,896 residents. Of these, 28,226 have Sammarinese citizenship, while 4,881 have Italian citizenship, with 789 citizens of other countries. Another 13,000 Sammarinese live abroad (6,600 in Italy, 3,000 in the US, 2,000 in France and Argentina). The first census since 1976 was conducted in 2010. Results were expected by the end of 2011; however, 13% of families did not return their forms. The official language of San Marino is Italian. The Sammarinese dialect of Romagnol is also spoken, mainly by the elderly. It is considered an endangered language.

=== Notable people ===
- Giovanni Battista Belluzzi (1506 in San Marino – 1554), architect
- Francesco Maria Marini (fl. 1637), composer of early Baroque music
- Francesco de' Marini (1630 in Genova – 1700), Catholic archbishop
- Antonio Onofri (1759–1825), statesman, "Father of his Country".
- Little Tony (1941 in Tivoli – 2013), pop and rock musician
- Luciano Maiani (born 1941 in Rome), physicist and Director-General of CERN.
- Pasquale Valentini (born 1953 in San Marino), politician who has held multiple ministerial posts
- Massimo Bonini (born 1959 in San Marino), football player who played for Juventus
- Marco Macina (born 1964 in San Marino), footballer who played for Bologna FC, Parma, Reggiana, and AC Milan.
- Valentina Monetta (born 1975 in San Marino), singer who represented San Marino four times in the Eurovision Song Contest
- Manuel Poggiali (born 1983 in San Marino), Grand Prix motorcycle road racing World Champion
- Alex de Angelis (born 1984 in Rimini), Grand Prix motorcycle road racer
- Alessandra Perilli (born 1988 in Rimini), shooting Olympic silver and bronze medalist and first San Marino citizen to win a medal (Tokyo 2020)
- Gian Marco Berti (born 1982 in San Marino), shooting Olympic silver medalist and second San Marino citizen to win a medal (Tokyo 2020)
- Myles Nazem Amine (born 1996 in Dearborn, Michigan), 2020 86 kg wrestling Olympic bronze medalist and third San Marino citizen to win a medal (Tokyo 2020)
- Chiara Beccari (born 2004 in San Marino), football player for Juventus

=== Religion ===
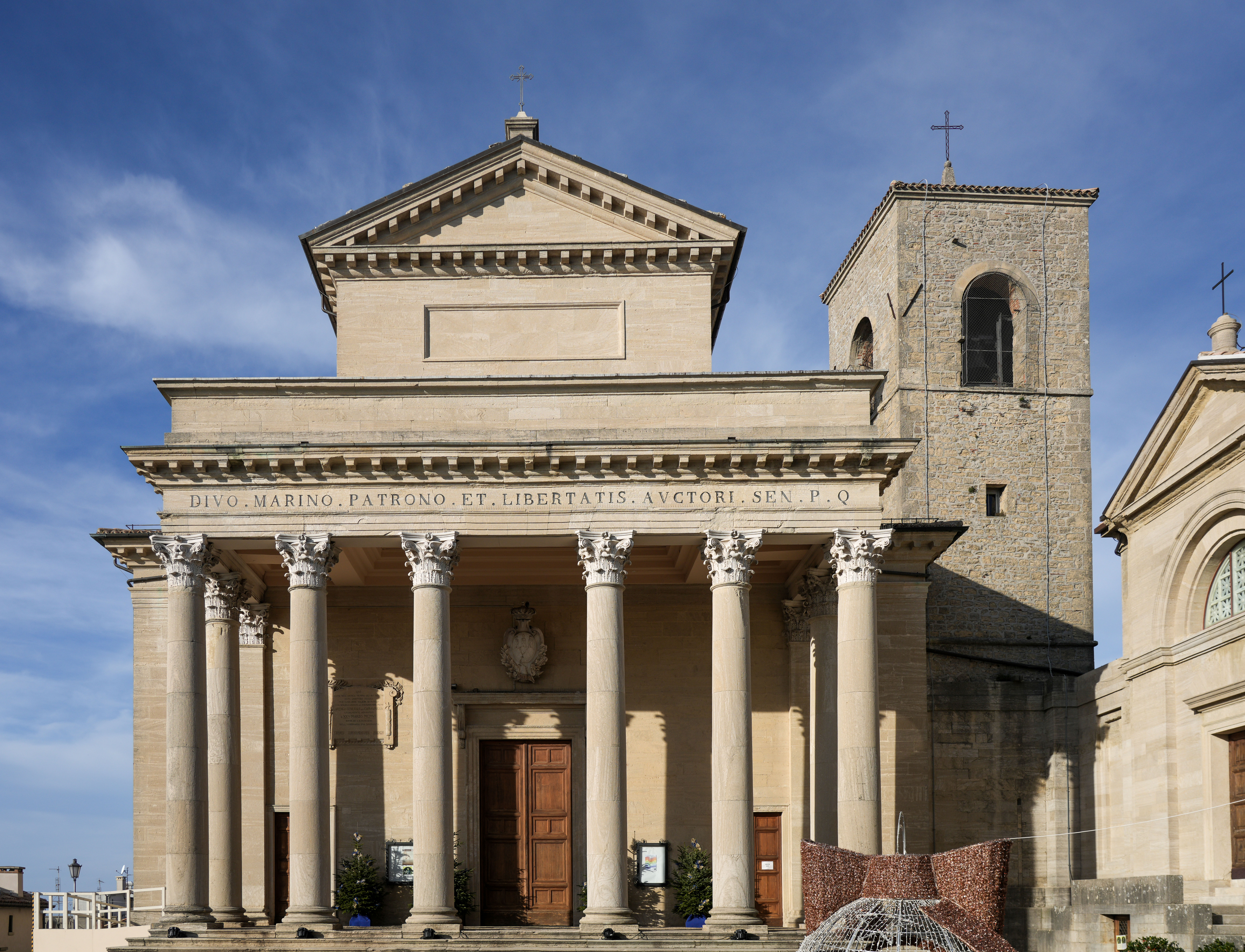
Basilica of San Marino

San Marino is a predominantly Catholic state, though Catholicism is not an established religion. 97.2% of the population professed the Catholic faith in 2011, and approximately half of those regularly attend church. There is no episcopal see in San Marino, although its name is part of the present diocesan title. Historically, the various parishes in San Marino were divided between two Italian dioceses, mostly in the Diocese of Montefeltro, and partly in the Diocese of Rimini. In 1977, the border between Montefeltro and Rimini was readjusted so that all of San Marino fell within the diocese of Montefeltro. The bishop of Montefeltro-San Marino resides in Pennabilli, in Italy's province of Pesaro e Urbino. The country's high Catholic majority can mainly be traced back to the country's founding, when Saint Marinus set up the first fortress to protect Christians from Roman persecution.

The small state's culture has primarily remained Catholic. There is a provision under the income tax rules that taxpayers have the right to request the allocation of 0.3% of their income tax to the Catholic Church or to charities. The Diocese of San Marino-Montefeltro was until 1977 the historic diocese of Montefeltro. It is a suffragan of the metropolitan Archdiocese of Ravenna-Cervia. The diocese includes all the parishes of San Marino. The earliest mention of Montefeltro, as Mona Feretri, is in the diplomas by which Charlemagne confirmed the donation of Pepin. The first known bishop of Montefeltro was Agatho (826), whose residence was at San Leo. Under Bishop Flaminios Dondi (1724) the see was again transferred to San Leo, but later it returned to Pennabilli. The historic diocese was a suffragan of the archdiocese of Urbino. Since 1988, there is formally an apostolic nunciature to the republic, but it is vested in the nuncio to Italy.

Other faiths include the Waldensian Church and Jehovah's Witnesses.

There has been a Jewish presence in San Marino for at least 600 years. The first mention of Jews in San Marino dates to the late 14th century, in official documents recording the business transactions of Jews. There are many documents throughout the 15th to 17th centuries describing Jewish dealings and verifying the presence of a Jewish community in San Marino. Jews were permitted official protection by the government. During World War II, San Marino provided a haven for more than 100,000 Jews and other Italians (approximately 10 times the Sammarinese population at the time) from Nazi persecution. As of 2012, few Jews remain. In 2019, the sculpture Dialogue by Michele Chiaruzzi was inaugurated at Saint Anne Chapel, the first monument of its kind devoted to interfaith dialogue. San Marino also holds the first Shinto shrine built in Europe approved by the Association of Shinto Shrines, that being the San Marino Jinja.

Religions in San Marino (2011)
Religion	%
Catholic	97.2%
Protestant	1.1%
Other Christian	0.7%
Jewish	0.1%
Other	0.1%
Not religious	0.7%
No answer	0.1%

=== Education ===
The Università degli Studi della Repubblica di San Marino (University of the Republic of San Marino) is the main university, which includes the Scuola Superiore di Studi Storici di San Marino (Graduate School of Historical Studies), a distinguished research and advanced international study centre governed by an international Scientific Committee coordinated by the emeritus historian Luciano Canfora. An important music institution is the Istituto Musicale Sammarinese (Sammarinese Musical Institute).

The Akademio Internacia de la Sciencoj San Marino or Accademia Internazionale delle Scienze San Marino (International Academy of Sciences San Marino) was known for adopting Esperanto as the language for teaching and for scientific publications. The Akademio was dissolved in 2020.

== Culture ==
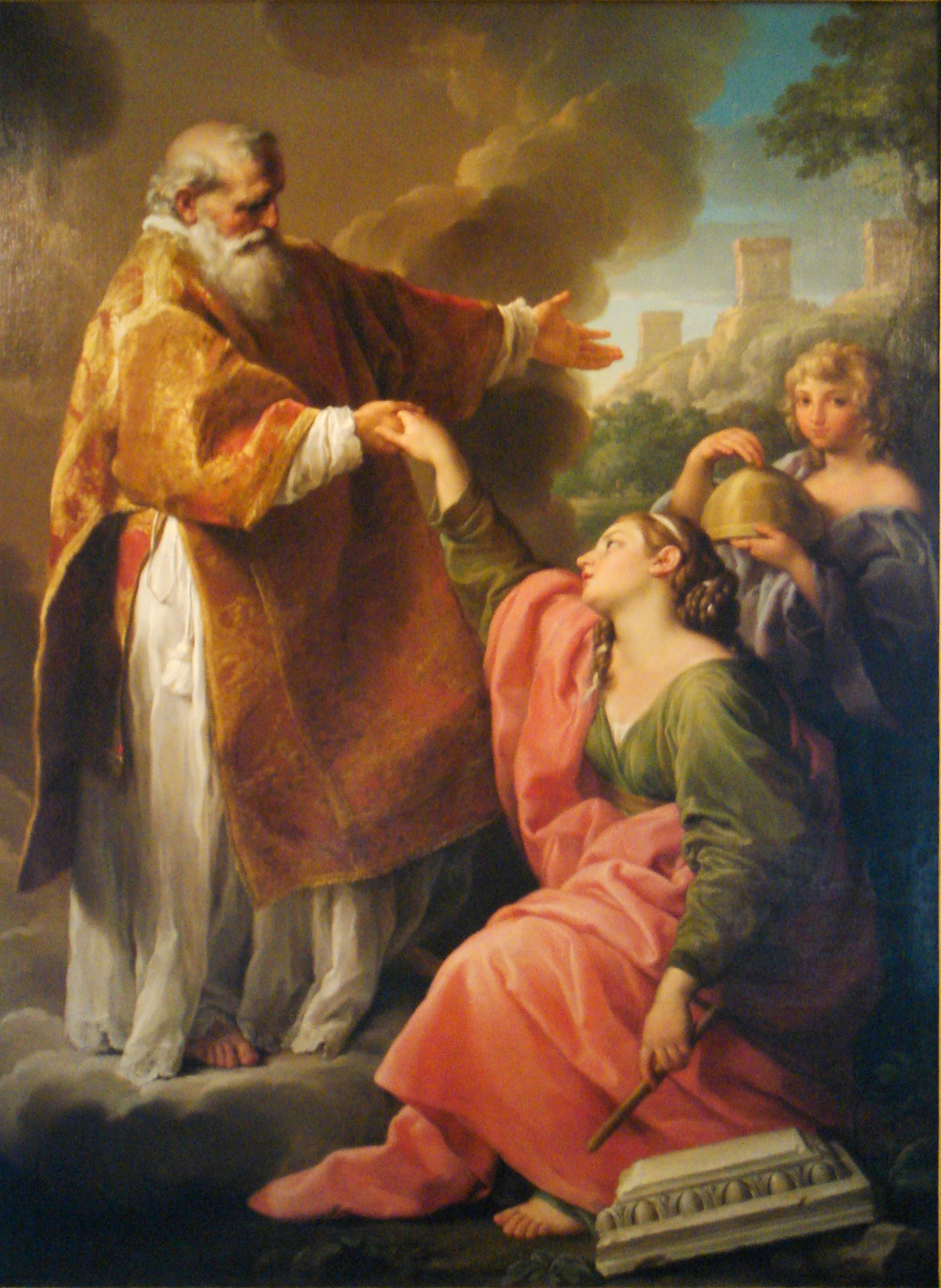
A painting in the Museo di Stato di San Marino by Pompeo Batoni

The Three Towers of San Marino are located on the three peaks of Monte Titano in the capital. They are depicted on the coat of arms, which is itself contained on the flag of San Marino. The three towers are: Guaita, the oldest of the three (it was constructed in the 11th century); the 13th-century Cesta, located on the highest of Monte Titano's summits; and the 14th-century Montale, on the smallest of Monte Titano's summits, still privately owned.

=== UNESCO ===
The site San Marino: Historic Centre and Mount Titano became part of the UNESCO World Heritage List in 2008. The decision was taken during the 32nd Session of the UNESCO World Heritage Committee composed of 21 countries convened in Québec, Canada.

=== Museums and galleries ===
There are a number of state-run national museums and galleries based in San Marino.

==== Museo delle Armi Antiche ====
The Museum of Ancient Arms is dedicated to ancient weapons, uniforms, armour and experimental weapons.

==== Museo di Stato ====
The State Museum has a permanent art collection dedicated to the history and legends of the Republic. Many of these pieces originally came from public and religious buildings in the City of San Marino. Also on display are paintings and objects from the Monastery of Saint Chiara. As well as the permanent collection, the museum also hosts temporary exhibitions such as Mario Ferretti: An Artistic Restlessness of the 20th Century. The main room of the museum displays paintings by Guercino and his pupils, Cesare Gennari and Benedetto Gennari, Matteo Loves and Elisabetta Sirani. The works in an adjacent room are dedicated to the two patron saints of the Republic, Saint Marino and Saint Agata. There are also objects, such as urns and plates, that are used by San Marino institutions. Other items on display are panel paintings and sculptures from the 15th and 16th centuries.

==== Pinacoteca di San Francesco ====
The St Francis art gallery displays archaeological, artistic and numismatic collections.

==== Galleria Nazionale ====
The National Gallery is for the protection, conservation and enhancement of the UNESCO heritage.

==== Museo del Francobollo e della Moneta ====
The museum is dedicated to the stamps and coins of San Marino.

==== Galleria d’Arte Moderna e Contemporanea ====
The Modern and Contemporary Art Gallery hosts more than 1,000 works dating from the period between the first decade of the 20th century to the present.

==== Museo dell’Emigrante ====
The Museum of the Emigrant is a permanent study centre dedicated to emigration. It opened in 1997 and is housed in the Monastery of Santa Chiara.

==== Museo di Storia Naturale ====
The Museum of Natural History is based in the San Marino Natural History Centre in the Borgo Maggiore municipality.

=== Theatre ===
The Teatro Nuovo (Serravalle) is a theatre of the Republic of San Marino located in Dogana, a town in the Serravalle municipality ("castello"), not far from the border with Italy. It has a capacity of 872 seats of which 604 are in the stalls and is the largest theatre in the republic.

=== Music ===
The country has a long and rich musical tradition, closely linked to that of Italy, but which is also highly independent in itself. A well-known 17th-century composer is Francesco Maria Marini, while the noted luthier Marino Capicchioni was born and raised in the country. The pop singer Little Tony achieved considerable success in the United Kingdom and Italy in the 1950s and 1960s. San Marino has taken part in the Eurovision Song Contest sixteen times, achieving four final qualifications to date (with then-three, eventually four-time contestant and San Marino native Valentina Monetta with "Maybe" in 2014, Turkish singer Serhat with "Say Na Na Na" who achieved 19th place in the final in 2019, Italian singer Senhit along with American rapper Flo Rida who qualified for the 2021 final with the song "Adrenalina" and Italian DJ and producer Gabry Ponte who qualified for the 2025 final with the song "Tutta l'Italia").

=== Cuisine ===
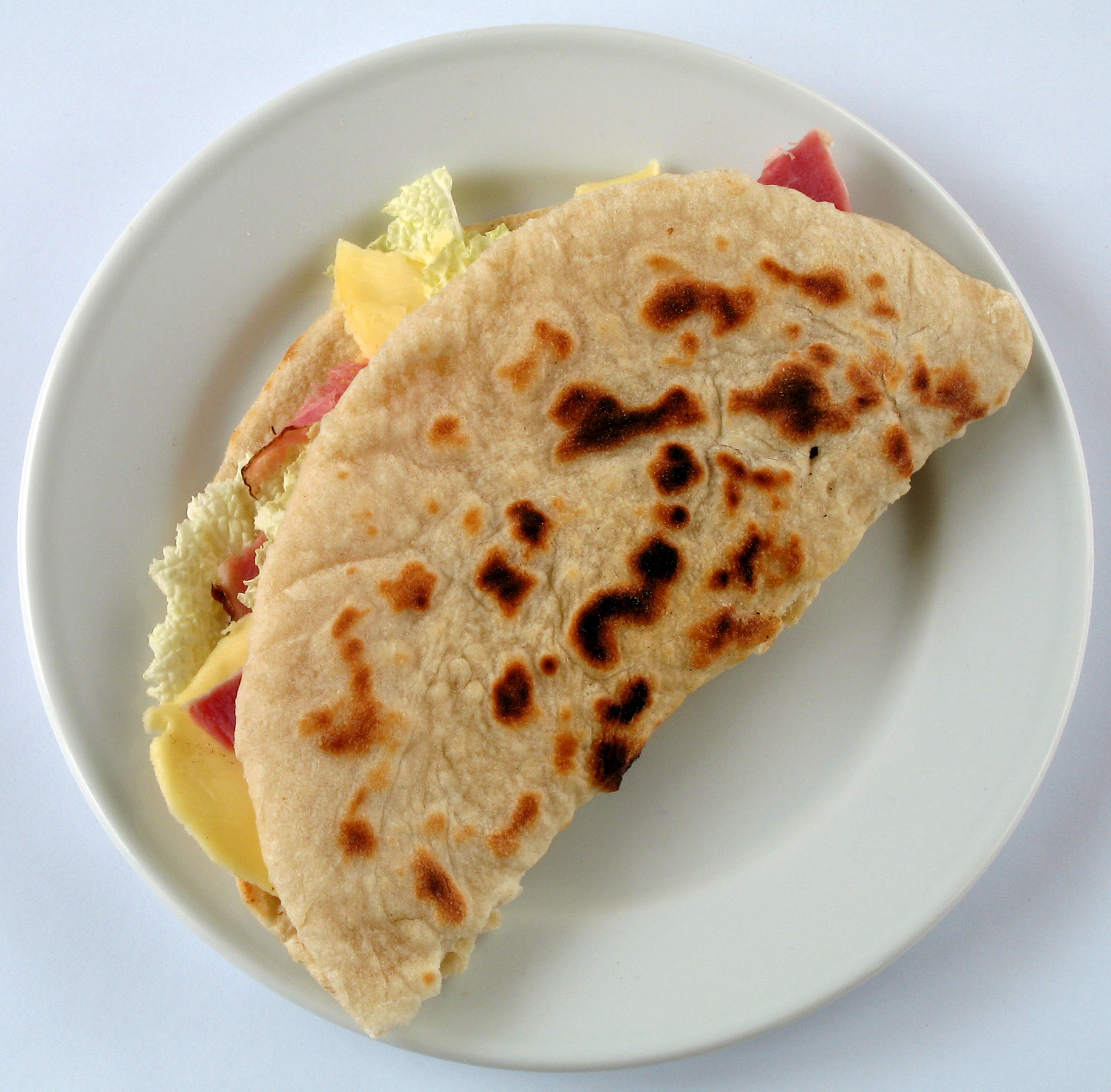
A piadina, a dish characteristic of the Italian region of Romagna and of San Marino

The cuisine of San Marino is extremely similar to central Italian cuisine, especially that of the adjoining Emilia-Romagna and Marche regions, but it has a number of its own unique dishes and products. Its best known is probably the Torta Tre Monti ("Cake of the Three Mountains" or "Cake of the Three Towers"), a wafer layered cake covered in chocolate depicting the Three Towers of San Marino. The country also has a small wine industry.

=== Sport ===
In San Marino, football is the most popular sport. Basketball and volleyball are also popular. The three sports have their own federations, the San Marino Football Federation, the San Marino Basketball Federation and the San Marino Volleyball Federation. San Marino has a club in the Italian football league system called A.S.D.V. San Marino and a domestic amateur league, the Campionato Sammarinese, whose teams also participate in European club competitions. Together with Italy, San Marino held the 2019 UEFA European Under-21 Championship, with teams playing at the Stadio Olimpico in Serravalle. With Italy being the sole automatic qualifiers, the Sammarinese team did not participate in the final tournament. The San Marino national football team has had little success, being made up of part-timers. The team has never qualified for a major tournament, and has recorded only three wins in the more than 25 years of its history. The first two,1–0 victories over Liechtenstein; the first came in a 2004 friendly, and the second, their first competitive victory, came during the group stage of the 2024–25 UEFA Nations League.

San Marino national football team's third win, a 3–1 victory against Liechtenstein was their first ever away victory. This carried additional prestige as it secured San Marino's promotion to league C for the 2026–27 UEFA Nations league, the greatest achievement in the team's history. They have drawn four more times, with their most notable result being a 1993 0–0 draw with Turkey during the European qualifiers for the 1994 FIFA World Cup. In the same qualifying competition, Davide Gualtieri scored a goal 8.3 seconds into a match against England; this goal held the record for the fastest in international football until 2016.

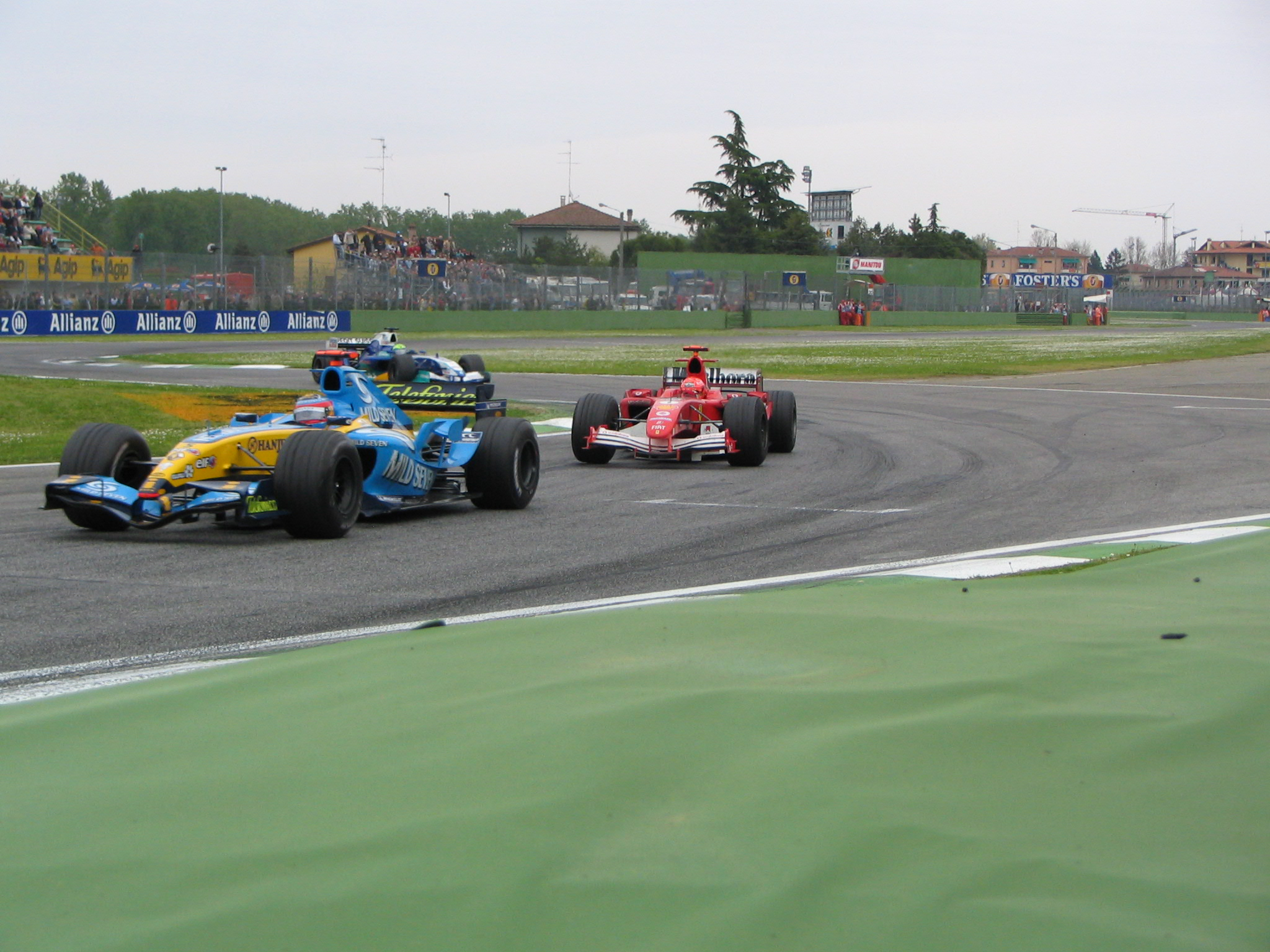
2005 San Marino Grand Prix held in Imola, Italy

A Formula One race, the San Marino Grand Prix, was named after the state, although it did not take place there. Instead, it was held at the Autodromo Enzo e Dino Ferrari in the Italian town of Imola, about 100 km (60 mi) northwest of San Marino. Roland Ratzenberger and Ayrton Senna suffered fatal accidents a day apart during the 1994 Grand Prix. This international event was removed from the calendar in 2007, although the circuit returned to the calendar from 2020 to 2025 as the Emilia Romagna Grand Prix. The San Marino and Rimini's Coast motorcycle Grand Prix was reinstated in the schedule in 2007 and takes place at the Misano World Circuit Marco Simoncelli, as does San Marino's round of the World Superbike Championship.

San Marino has a professional baseball team which plays in Italy's top division. It has participated in the European Cup tournament for the continent's top club sides several times, hosting the event in 1996, 2000, 2004, and 2007. It won the championship in 2006, 2011, and 2014. Shooting is also very popular in San Marino, with many shooters having taken part in international competitions and the Olympic Games. At the 2020 Summer Olympics, San Marino became the smallest country to earn an Olympic medal when Alessandra Perilli won a bronze medal in the women's trap. They later won another medal, this one silver, with Perilli's and Gian Marco Berti's performance in the mixed trap shooting event.

=== Public holidays and festivals ===
Date	Name	Explanation
1 January	New Year's Day	Festival marking the beginning of the new year
6 January	Epiphany	Commemorates the visit of the three wise men or magi to the infant Jesus
5 February	Feast of Saint Agatha	Commemoration of Saint Agatha, co-patroness of the Republic after the country was liberated from foreign rule on her feast day in 1740
Variable, the first Sunday after the first full moon after the vernal equinox	Easter	Resurrection of Jesus
Variable, the Monday after Easter Sunday	Easter Monday	Monday after Easter day
25 March	Anniversary of the Arengo	Anniversary of the 1906 Arengo and the Festa delle Milizie (Feast of the Militants)
1 May	Labour Day	Celebration of workers and employees
Variable, the first Thursday after Trinity Sunday	Corpus Christi	Commemoration of the body and blood of Jesus Christ
28 July	Liberation from Fascism	Commemoration of the fall of the Sammarinese Fascist Party
15 August	Ferragosto (Assumption)	Commemoration of the Virgin Mary's assumption into heaven
3 September	The Feast of Saint Marinus and the Republic	National feast of Saint Marinus (San Marino), celebrating the origin of the Republic in 301
1 November	All Saints' Day	Feast dedicated to all saints
2 November	Commemoration of all those who died at war	Remembrance of all those who gave their lives for San Marino in war
8 December	Immaculate Conception	Remembrance of the Virgin Mary's conception without original sin
24 December	Christmas Eve	Day before the commemoration of the birth of Jesus
25 December	Christmas	Birth of Jesus
26 December	Saint Stephen's Day	Commemoration of the death of Saint Stephen, the first Christian martyr
31 December	New Year's Eve	Celebration which closes and marks the end of the year

== See also ==
- Outline of San Marino
- Order of San Marino
- Order of Saint Agatha
- Associazione Guide Esploratori Cattolici Sammarinesi
