= Matris Domini Monastery =

Coordinates: 45°41′56.7″N 9°40′5.4″E

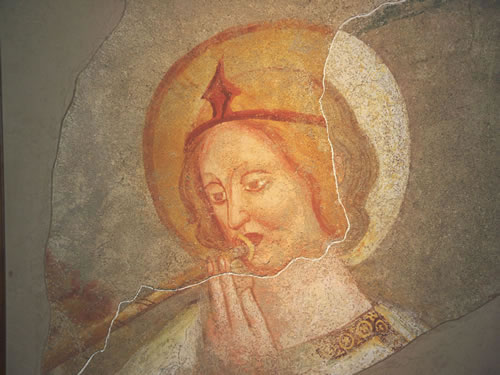
Angel, detail

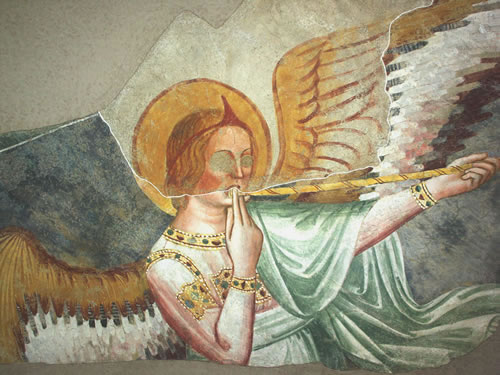
Angel with trumpet

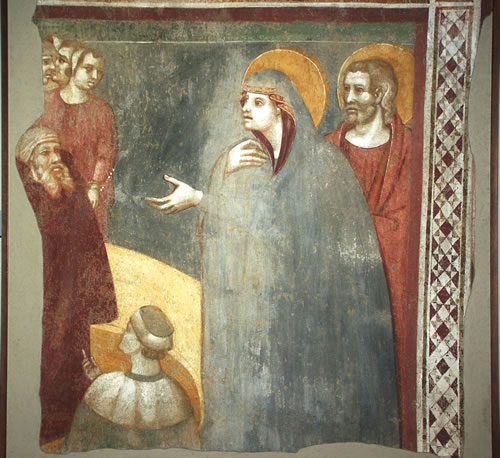
The Quest for Jesus

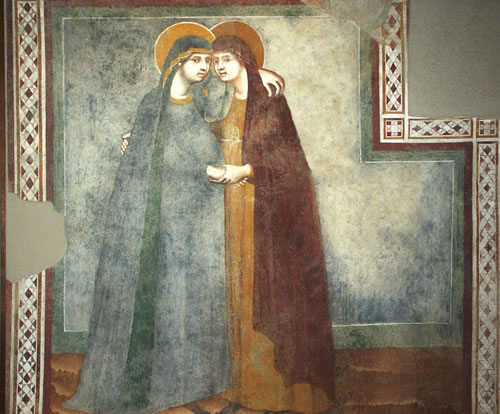
The Visitation

The Matris Domini Monastery is an enclosed female monastery located in the lower part of Bergamo, Italy. It hosts the museum of the same name. The collection includes several medieval frescoes with religious themes.

== History ==
The monastery was founded during the second half of the 13th century by the Dominican Order to house a community of nuns. There is no certain date for the foundation, probably during the rule of Bishop Algiso da Rosate or that of Erbordo Ungano. Its church was consecrated on 25 March 1273 by Bishop Guiscardo Suardi.

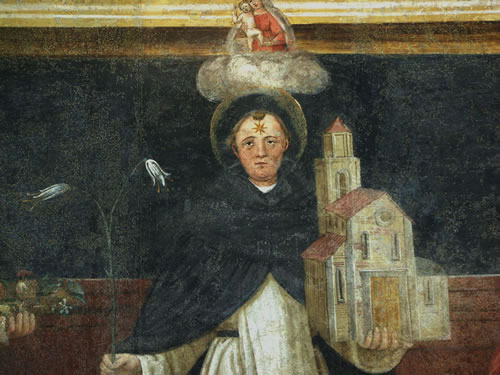
Saint Dominic

From its beginning, the monastery experienced the continuous development and growth of its community. It was rebuilt in 1359 and was enlarged in the 16th and 17th centuries, but it was suppressed during the occupation of Italy by French forces during the Napoleonic Wars.

In modern times, it was converted into a Gestapo prison during the German occupation of Italy during World War II. The monastery was eventually returned to its own original function and to the nuns.

== The museum ==
The monastery displays in ad hoc premises Romanesque frescoes, thus constituting the Matris Domini Museum. The frescoes, originating from the same monastery, where they were decorating different sites of the original structure, have been saved from degradation by detaching and transferring them on ad hoc substrates.

Dating from the 13th and the 14th century, they are among the earliest examples of the fresco painting art in Lombardy, some of them are among the most ancient altogether.

Together with the Visitation, other frescoes are displayed, some of them well- preserved. Scenes include the Just, the Blessed, two Angels with a trumpet, Saint Peter on the throne, Hell, all attributed to the Master of the Life Tree.

Other frescoes depict Jesus among the Doctors, The Baptism of Jesus, The Virgin with Child Enthroned, The Miracle of the Wheel by Saint Catherine of Alexandria, Saint Martin with the Pauper, Jesus entering Jerusalem and the Miracle of Napoleone Orsini's reanimation by Saint Dominic. These works, together with the Visitation, have been attributed to the First Master of Chiaravalle.

The museum also houses five polychrome glass circles, originating from the 14th century stained glass window which decorated the apse of the old church. They are the oldest vitreous work in Lombardy.

The largest displays the Virgin and Blessing Child and shares with the two circles depicting the angels the peculiarity of the face and the hands devoid of color. The other two circles show Saint Dominic Blessing and Peter of Verona, the first Dominican saint.

== The church ==
Next to the museum, also part of the convent complex, is the church, consecrated in 1273 and composed, following the female monasteries' tradition, by an internal chapel constituted by a nave and two aisles, and by the external church.

The latter was radically transformed in the 17th century into a luminous Baroque environment, decorated by stuccoes and frescoes, including some by Pietro Baschenis, as well as several altarpieces situated in the side chapels.

Above the main altar is the 17th-century altarpiece of the Annunciation, executed by an unknown master. At its sides there are the altarpiece of the Adoration of the Shepherds (also by an unknown artist) and the Massacre of the Innocents by Pietro Ricchi.

The chapels are decorated by altarpieces dating from the 18th and 19th century. The Triptych of Saint Peter Martyr is missing from the church, since it was stolen during Napoleon's era.

== Sources ==
- Angelini G.B., Descrizione del venerabile Monastero di Santa Maria Mater Domini di Bergamo. Bergamo, 1750.
- Angelini L., Affreschi trecenteschi in Bergamo. Bergamo, 1953.
- Garin, Eugenio, Medioevo e Rinascimento - Laterza 2005 Bari - ISBN 88-420-7669-4
- Garin Eugenio a cura, L'uomo del Rinascimento - Laterza 2000 Bari - ISBN 88-420-4794-5
- Huizinga Johan, L'autunno del Medioevo, Newton, 1997 Roma - ISBN 88-8183-898-2
- Perdichizzi M. Il Monastero di Santa Maria Matris Domini in Bergamo durante il secolo XVI - Tesi di Laurea, Università Cattolica di Milano.
- Piccinni G. - I mille anni del medioevo - Milano, Bruno Mondadori, 1999, ISBN 88-424-9355-4.
- Zanella V., Di quaranta e più monache capace in Il monastero Matris Domini in Bergamo. Monumenta Borgomensia, Bergamo 1980.
- Tardito R., Vicissitudini degli affreschi in Il monastero Matris Domini in Bergamo. Monumenta Borgomensia, Bergamo 1980.
