= Nicla Vassallo =

Italian philosopher (born 1963)

Nicla Vassallo (born 1963), is an Italian analytic philosopher with research and teaching interests in epistemology, philosophy of knowledge, theoretical philosophy, as well as gender studies and feminist epistemology. She is currently a Full Professor in the Department of Philosophy at the University of Genoa, a Research Associate of National Research Council, and on List of alumni of King's College London. She also is a poet and lives in Rome.

== Biography ==
Vassallo studied physics and philosophy at the University of Genoa, and philosophy at King's College London mainly with Anthony Savile, David Papineau, Mark Sainsbury, Scott Sturgeon, Keith Hossack, Christopher Hughes. Over the years, she has benefited and still benefits from conversations with them and Jennifer Hornsby. After receiving her Doctor of Philosophy in Philosophy of Science, she was appointed Research Fellow and then Lecturer. In 2002 she qualified as Associate Professor of Logic and Philosophy of Science at the University of Catania, and then in 2004 as Full Professor of theoretical philosophy at the University of Bergamo. From 2003 to 2008 she taught Epistemology in the Faculty of Psychology at the Vita-Salute San Raffaele University. Since 2005 she has been a full professor in the Department of Philosophy at the University of Genova, where she taught Philosophical Propaedeutics, Philosophy of knowledge and Epistemology. She now teaches theoretical philosophy, is an Academic personnel of the course/degree of Doctorate in Philosophy Fino, a Research Associate of National Research Council, as well as on List of alumni of King's College London, she is member of the jury of Premio Strega Poesia.

== Publications ==
The following is a partial list of Vassallo's books.

=== Publications as author ===
- (1995), La depsicologizzazione della logica. Un confronto tra Boole e Frege, FrancoAngeli, Milano.
- (1997), La naturalizzazione dell'epistemologia. Contro una soluzione quineana, FrancoAngeli, Milano.
- (1999), Teorie della conoscenza filosofico-naturalistiche, FrancoAngeli, Milano.
- (2002), Conoscenza e natura, De Ferrari Editore, Genova.
- (2003), Teoria della conoscenza, Laterza, Roma-Bari.
- (2007), Filosofia delle donne, Laterza, Roma-Bari.
- (2010), Piccolo trattato di epistemologia, Codice Edizioni, Torino.
- (2011), Per sentito dire. Conoscenza e testimonianza, Feltrinelli, Milano.
- (2012), Conversazioni, Mimesis, Milano.
- (2015), Frege on Thinking and Its Epistemic Significance, Lexington Books–Rowman & Littlefield, Lanham, MD, Usa
- (2015), Il matrimonio omosessuale è contro natura: falso!, Laterza, Roma-Bari.
- (2015), Breve viaggio tra scienza e tecnologia, con etica e donne, Orthotes Editrice, Napoli–Salerno.
- (2019), Non annegare: meditazioni sulla conoscenza e sull'ignoranza, Mimesis, Sesto San Giovanni (Milan).
- (2019), Contextualism, Factivity and Clousure. A Union That Should Not That Place, Springer, New York.
- (2021), Fatti non foste a viver come bruti. Brevi e imprecisi percorsi per la filosofia della conoscenza, Mimesis, Sesto San Giovanni (Milan).
- (2023), Donne, donne, donne, Mimesis, Sesto San Giovanni (Milan).

=== Some edited collections ===
- (2002), Storia della filosofia analitica, Einaudi, Torino.
- (2003), La filosofia di Gottlob Frege, FrancoAngeli, Milano.
- (2003), Filosofia delle scienze, Einaudi, Torino.
- (2008), Knowledge, Language, and Interpretation. On the Philosophy of Donald Davidson, Ontos Verlag, Frankfurt.
- (2009), Donna m'apparve, Codice Edizioni, Torino.
- (2012), Reason and Rationality, Ontos Verlag, Frankfurt.
- (2016), Meta-Philosophical Reflection on Feminist Philosophies of Science, Springer, New York.
- (2018) La Donna non esiste. E l'Uomo? Sesso, genere e identità, Codice Edizioni, Torino.
- (2022), Parla come mangi. Massa e potere, Mimesis, Sesto San Giovanni (Milan).
- 2023), Donne, Donne Donne, Mimesis, Sesto San Giovanni (Milan).

=== Poems ===
- (2013), Orlando in ordine sparso, Mimesis, Sesto San Giovanni (Milan).
- (2017), Metafisiche insofferenti per donzelle insolenti, Mimesis, Sesto San Giovanni (Milan).
- (2021), Pandemia amorosa dolorosa, Mimesis, Sesto San Giovanni (Milan).

=== Journalism ===
Prof Vassallo has written for the Corriere della Sera, il Fatto quotidiano, la Repubblica, Il Sole 24 ore, L'Unità. Today she sometimes collaborates with various newspapers and web magazines.

== Activism ==
Prof. Vassallo has worked and is working on human rights campaigns since the 1990s, with different Italian Institution (i.e. Fondazione Onda, Fondazione Nilde Iotti, Rete Lenford) for women’s rights especially violence against women and for LGBT persons. In this regard, some of her “travel companions”: Giovanni Bachelet, Marzio Bargagli, Remo Bodei, Massimo Cacciari, Anna Canepa, Lella Costa, Franco Grillini, Vittorio Lingiardi, Giacomo Marramao, Melania Mazzucco, Rossella Panarese, Stefano Rodotà, Chiara Saraceno, Carla Signoris, Delia Vaccarello. Among other things, Prof. Vassallo is part of Donne Oltre the Italian Multiple Sclerosis Association. Together with some intellectuals she signed the "Manifesto for a Europe of Progress", for the Europe of the peoples, of a Europe of Progress! Made based on the principles of freedom, democracy, knowledge, and solidarity, promoted by Carlo Bernardini, Rino Falcone, Pietro Greco, Francesco Lenci, Giulio Peruzzi, Settimo Termini, and others. She supported the candidacy of Ginevra Bompiani for the European elections of The Left "La Sinistra" party. She wrote the obituary of Rita Levi Montalcini for “Sapere”. Prof. Vassallo is agnostic.
