= Scuola Superiore di Studi Storici di San Marino =

Doctoral institute for historical studies in San Marino

Coordinates: 43°56′15.7″N 12°26′42.3″E

The Scuola Superiore di Studi Storici di San Marino (Graduate School of Historical Studies at San Marino), established in 1988, is a doctoral institution in San Marino, dedicated to historical research and related humanities.

== Historical background ==
The Scuola Superiore di Studi Storici was inaugurated with a public lecture by Eugenio Garin on 30 September 1989 in the presence of Federico Mayor Zaragoza, UNESCO General Director, and Fausta Morganti, San Marino Secretary of State for Public and Higher Education and Culture. Garin's lecture, entitled "Polibio e Machiavelli" ("Polybius and Machiavelli"), was subsequently edited by Gemma Cavalleri in July 1990 and published by the San Marino Ministry of State for Higher and Public Education and Culture. The lecture text has since been republished by the Italian Turin-based publisher Einaudi, together with the introductory essay to the text of Istorie Fiorentine reprinted from the Le Monnier 1857 edition. In collaboration with the Einaudi publishing house, the Scuola published several volumes in the "Piccola biblioteca Einaudi" series between 1993 and 1997, while in 2010 it launched the "Critica storica" series with the Il Mulino publishing house.

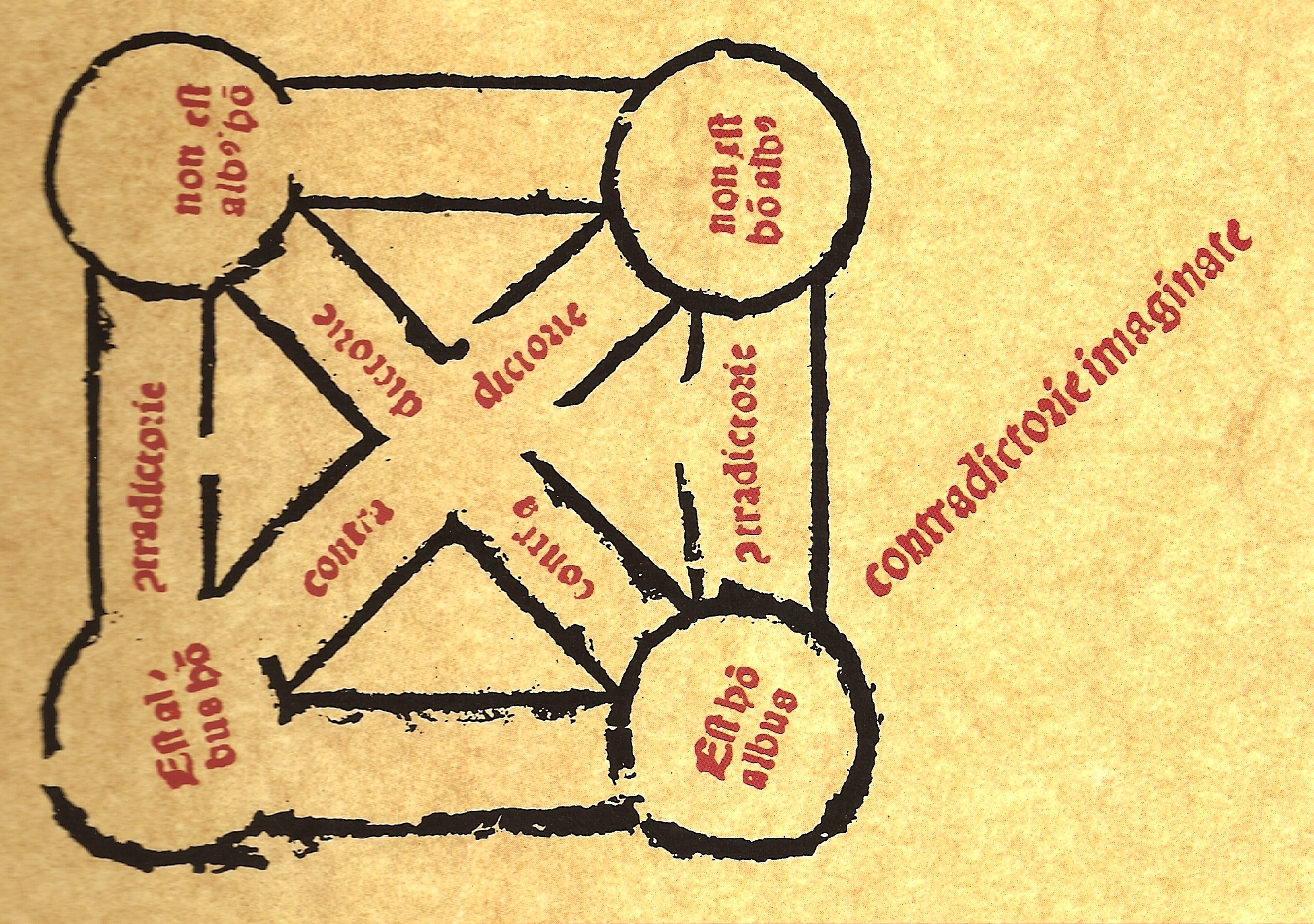
Detail from the cover of the published version of Eugenio Garin's inaugural lecture edited by Gemma Cavalleri (1990)

== Organization ==
The Scuola is administratively responsible to the Department of History within the University of the Republic of San Marino (Università degli Studi della Repubblica di San Marino), whose first enactment the Scuola's inauguration was. Its principal activity is a triennial doctoral programme which has represented from its inception in 1989 one of Europe's most innovative experiments in this field. The doctorate in historical studies (referred to in Italian as a Dottorato di ricerca, equivalent to a degree of Ph.D. or D.Phil. in the English-speaking world) is unusual in the level of interdisciplinary instruction offered to students. A distinguished Consiglio scientifico or academic council, recruited from Italy and beyond, is intended to ensure the strength and breadth of this interdisciplinarity, particularly in history and other humanities.

== Doctoral programme ==
Doctoral students attending the Scuola - some of whom are awarded full funding in the form of a borsa or scholarship on entry - have been drawn mainly from Italy and occasionally from San Marino itself; but a very substantial minority have come from other countries all over the world. During the first two years of each triennial cycle students attend intensive series of lectures delivered on historical and related academic disciplines delivered by a similarly international range of distinguished academics. At the same time they research and write their doctoral theses, which from the third year of the cycle becomes their sole academic focus. The Scuola recognises three official languages, Italian, English and French, and will accept theses written in any of the three. Students' doctoral supervisors are usually academics from other universities appointed as visiting staff for the purpose. The degree is awarded on the basis of the thesis and a viva voce examination.

The first three triennial cycles ran from 1989 to 1995; after a hiatus the series resumed in 1999.

== Directors ==
The Scuola has had two directors, both Italian ancient historians and public intellectuals: Aldo Schiavone (from 1989 to 1994) and Luciano Canfora (from 1999).

== Faculty and professors ==
All the academics making up the Scientific Committee give lectures at the Scuola as well as invited external scholars. Among others, the Scuola has hosted, mostly on a regular basis, Giuseppe Alberigo, Etienne Balibar, Remo Bodei, Lucio Gambi, Jacques Le Goff, Jacques Revel, Ruggiero Romano, Nicola Tranfaglia, Valerio Castronovo, Umberto Eco, Andrea Giardina, Eric Hobsbawm, Michael Crawford, Michel Korinman, Charles S. Maier, Giacomo Marramao, Nicola Matteucci, Anthony Molho, Wolfgang Mommsen, Romano Prodi, Adriano Prosperi, Ezio Raimondi, Paolo Rossi, Silvia Ronchey, Corrado Vivanti, Brigitte Mondrain, Pier Paolo Portinaro, Nicola Labanca, Pierre Lévêque, Évelyne Patlagean, Chiara Frugoni, Eva Cantarella, Carlo Ginzburg, Ivano Dionigi, Carlo Ossola, Salvo Mastellone, Aldo Agosti, Marco Revelli, Pietro Scoppola, Alberto Burgio, Enzo Collotti, Armando Petrucci, Domenico Losurdo, Ramón Teja Casuso, Santiago Montero Herrero, Paolo Luigi Branca, André Vauchez, Tullio Gregory, Angelo Panebianco, Giovanna Daverio Rocchi, Giovanni Levi, Franco Farinelli, Giuliana Gemelli, Furio Diaz, Giuseppe Nenci, Alain Boureau, Michel Sot, Raimondo Luraghi and Robert Nation.

== Alumni ==
Among those who have studied and received their doctorates at the Scuola the following have attained eminence in their fields: Krzysztof Olendzki, formerly (2006-7) Polish minister of culture and since 2008 Poland's ambassador to Tunisia; French historian of ideas and social commentator Marie Judith Revel; Italian historian of the French Revolution and of the myth of Padre Pio, Sergio Luzzatto; Michele Chiaruzzi, Ambassador of San Marino in Sarajevo; Nicola Renzi, former Secretary of State for Foreign Affairs of San Marino; Antonio Natalicchio, former mayor of Giovinazzo in Apulia, Italy; Roberto Gualtieri, Mayor of Rome, former Minister of Economy and Finances of Italy, and former Chair of the Economic and Monetary Affairs Committee of the European Parliament, Marie Favereau, French historian and writer.

== Young Collection Exhibition at the Salone Internazionale del Libro 2010 ==
In 2010 at the International Book Show (Salone Internazionale del Libro) in Turin, Italy, San Marino University Library exhibited the most precious volumes from the Young Collection, the richest collection of works on memory and mnemotechnics in the world. The Young Collection is conserved in the University library in San Marino. It includes 197 books from the nineteenth century as well as 11 incunabula, almost 2000 monographs of later date, 2000 articles, 500 prints, illustrations and artefacts, and other materials relating to memory and memorization.

== Twentieth anniversary ==
On 27 February 2009, the twentieth anniversary from the Scuola foundation was celebrated in the presence of the Eccellentissimi Capitani Reggenti della Repubblica di San Marino (The Captains Regent). The celebration was presided over by Luciano Canfora and included three lectures by Maurice Aymard on 'I territori e i tempi della storia oggi', Giuseppe Galasso on 'Storicismo e identità europea' and Adriano Prosperi on 'L'età del disciplinamento: un bilancio'.

== Italian Association of History of Political Thought Annual Conference ==
On 29 September 2023, the Scuola hosted the Italian Association of History of Political Thought Annual Conference titled 'Forms and Cultures of War: Lessons from the Classics'.

== Positive assessment ==
On 5 July 2009, one of the most influential columnists on the Italian newspaper Corriere della Sera, historian, and former Italian ambassador to Moscow, Sergio Romano, wrote an article in praise of the University of San Marino and specifically describing the Scuola as "una eccellente scuola di alti studi frequentata da ottimi studiosi" ("an outstanding school of advanced studies attended by excellent scholars").

== The "Artemidorus papyrus" controversy ==
In 1998 the influential pages of "Archiv für Papyrusforschung" brought a papyrus of obscure origin ("Artemidorus papyrus") to the attention of scholars. In 2004 the Compagnia San Paolo Art Foundation bought the piece for 2.75 million euros, eulogizing the acquisition. Then, the Director of the Scuola Luciano Canfora opened a dramatic public debate on its authenticity and in several successive contributions demonstrated that the so-called "Artemidorus papyrus" was a forgery. In 2018 Turin prosecutors probed that the "Artemidorus papyrus" was a large-scale fraud.

== Honorary degree ==
The Scuola has awarded an honorary doctorate degree (honoris causa) to Andrea Riccardi (2021) and Alessandro Barbero (2022).
