= University of the Republic of San Marino =

University in San Marino

Coordinates: 43.9364°N 12.4460°E

- Università degli Studi della Repubblica di San Marino
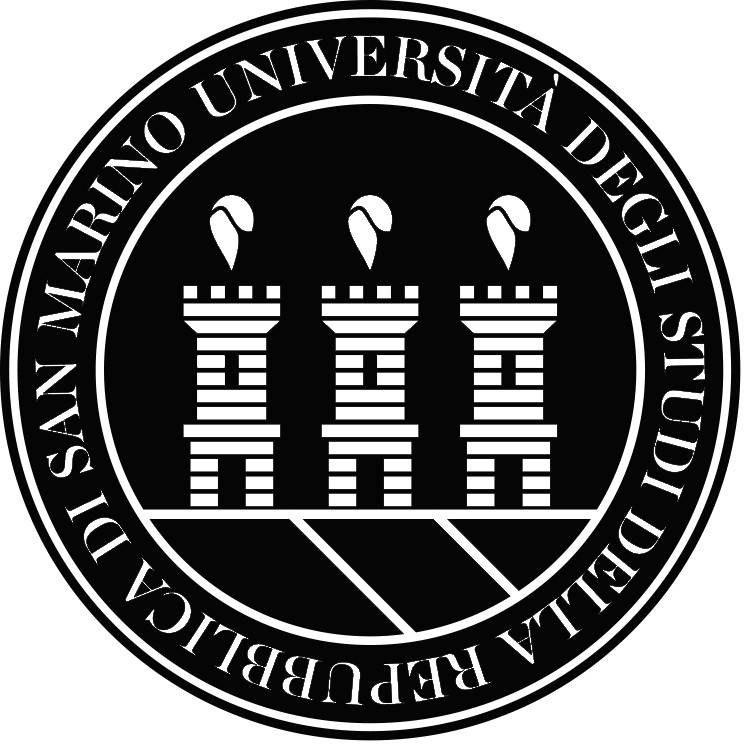
- Motto: Si parva licet componere magnis
- Motto in English: If it be allowable to compare small things with great
- Type: National University
- Established: 1985; 41 years ago
- Affiliations: European Higher Education Area (EHEA), European University Association (EUA), Network of Universities of Small Countries and Territories (NUSCT)
- Rector: Corrado Petrocelli
- Location: Città di San Marino, Dogana, Montegiardino
- Website: unirsm.sm

The University of the Republic of San Marino (in Italian: Università degli Studi della Repubblica di San Marino) is a public research university in the Republic of San Marino. It was created in 1985, but it started its activities with the Scuola Superiore di Studi Storici.

== Organization ==
Following the academic reorganization which took place in 2014 after the approval the same year of new framework legislation on academic education in San Marino, the university has been divided in 3 departments:

- Department of Economics, Sciences and Law
- Department of Human Sciences
- Department of History and of Sammarinese Culture and History

Previously, there were 6 departments:

- Department of Biomedical Studies
- Department of Communication
- Department of Education and Training
- Department of Economics and Technology
- Department of Historical Studies (composed of the Scuola Superiore di Studi Storici and the Centro di Studi Storici)
- Department of Law Studies

Its library has more than 30,000 books.

== Academic profile ==
=== Undergraduate courses ===
The university offers four undergraduate programmes:

- Civil Engineering (in association with the University of Modena and Reggio Emilia)
- Engineering Management (in association with the University of Parma)
- Design (in association with the University of Bologna)
- Chartered Building Surveyor program (in association with the University of Modena and Reggio Emilia)
- Communication and Digital Media program (in association with the University of Bologna)

=== Postgraduate courses ===
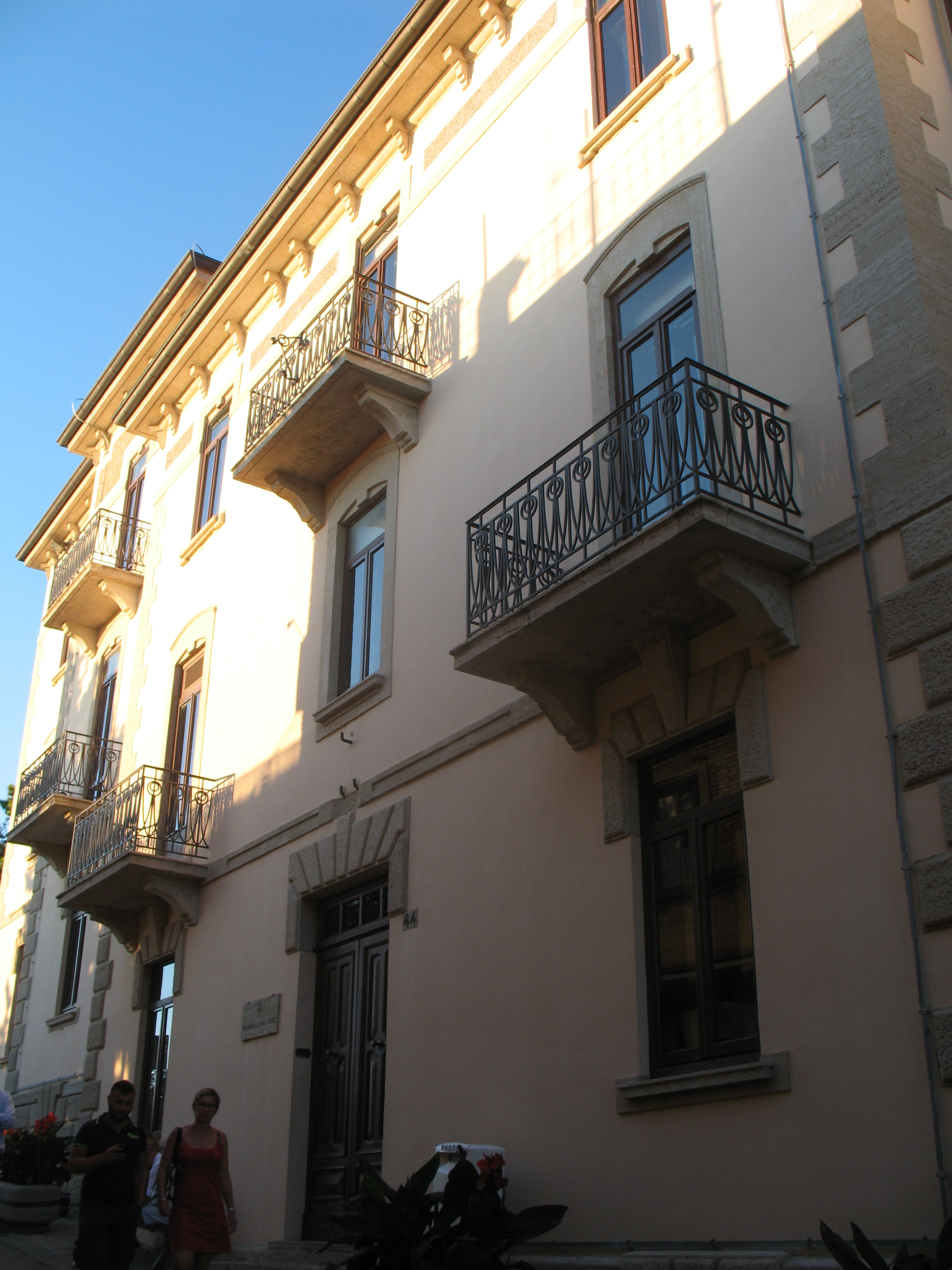
The university's central building, pictured in 2016

The university offers a number of postgraduate courses, most of which in collaboration with other universities:

- Laurea magistrale
  - Civil Engineering (in association with the University of Modena and Reggio Emilia)
  - Engineering Management (in association with the University of Parma)
  - Design
- Master
  - Aesthetic Medicine (in association with the University of Perugia)
  - Aesthetic Surgery (in association with the University of Perugia)
  - Communication, Management and New Media (in association with the IUAV University of Venice)
  - Criminology and Forensic Psychiatry (in association with the University of Urbino)
  - Geriatric Medicine (in association with the University of Ferrara)
  - Learning Disabilities (in association with the University of Modena and Reggio Emilia and the University of Urbino)
  - Strategy and Planning of Sports Events and Complexes (in association with the University of Parma)
- PhD
  - Historical Sciences

=== Research Centres ===
The university hosts the Research Centre for International Relations, the first Sammarinese institution to win a European tender.

== Notable people ==
- Luciano Canfora, classicist and historian, scientific coordinator of the Scuola Superiore di Studi Storici di San Marino since 1999
- Michele Chiaruzzi, historian and diplomat, ambassador of San Marino in Sarajevo
- Roberto Gualtieri, Mayor of Rome, former Minister of Economy and Finances of Italy, and former Chair of the Economic and Monetary Affairs Committee of the European Parliament.
- Krzysztof Jan Olendzki, Polish politician and diplomat, ambassador to Slovenia and former Undersecretary of State in Ministry of Culture and National Heritage of Poland
- Nicola Renzi, former Secretary of State for Foreign Affairs of San Marino
- Renato Zangheri, historian and politician, mayor of Bologna (1970-1983) and MP (1983-1992), rector of the university (1991-1994)

== See also ==
- List of universities in San Marino
