= Vaccarello =

Vaccarello is a surname. Notable people with the surname include:

- Anthony Vaccarello (born 1982), Belgian-Italian fashion designer
- Delia Vaccarello (1960-2019), Italian journalist and writer
