= Concita De Gregorio =

Italian journalist and writer

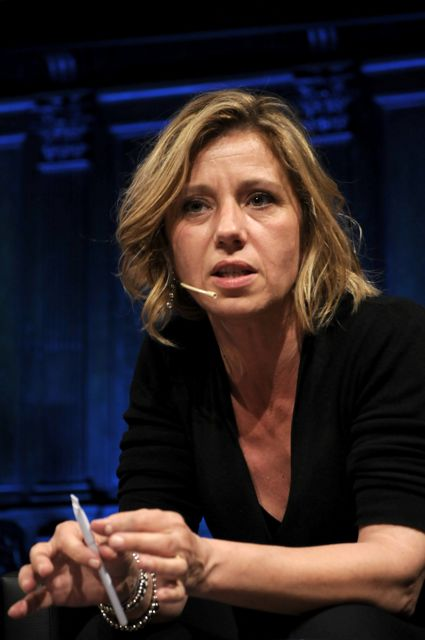
- Concita De Gregorio in 2013 at the International Journalism Festival in Perugia
- Born: 19 November 1963 (age 62); Pisa
- Occupation: Journalist Writer Radio and TV presenter

Concita De Gregorio (born 19 November 1963) is an Italian journalist, writer, radio and television presenter, and commentator. She is an editorial columnist at la Repubblica and was editor-in-chief of l'Unità from 2008 to 2011.

== Early life ==
De Gregorio was born in Pisa, Italy, on 19 November 1963, to a Catalonian mother, Maria Concha, and a Tuscan father of Sicilian origin, Paolo De Gregorio, the latter a magistrate in Livorno Province. She grew up in the city of Livorno where she attended the Liceo Classico Niccolini Guerrazzi. She obtained her bachelor's degree in political science at the University of Pisa.

== Career ==
During her university years, De Gregorio entered the field of journalism, working at local radio and television stations in the region. In 1985, she joined Il Tirreno, working for eight years in their Piombino, Livorno, Lucca and Pistoia offices. In 1998, she moved to La Repubblica, focusing on domestic news and politics. In 2001 she published Non lavate questo sangue ('Don't Wash This Blood'), an account of the turmoil that surrounded the 28th G8 summit in Genoa, and an article for the literary journal Adelphi. In 2006, Arnoldo Mondadori Editore published her Una madre lo sa ('A Mother Knows'), among the finalists the following year for the Premio Bancarella.

A controversy arose around De Gregorio in July 2008. The magazine Prima Comunicazione prematurely released excerpts from an interview in which she revealed that she had accepted an offer from Renato Soru, the new owner of l'Unità, to become the daily's editor. In the same interview, she discussed her guiding principles for that position. The news produced an outcry at l'Unità. The editorial board protested the announcement-by-interview of the change in the directorship. The following 22 August, the selection of De Gregorio as editor was made official. She was the first woman to hold that position at the paper. She remained in that position until 7 July 2011, when she returned to la Repubblica.

Judicial proceedings followed years later in the aftermath of her experience at l'Unità. When the publishing company owning the paper went bankrupt, as managing editor De Gregorio was subjected to joint liability claims in connection with defamation lawsuits filed against the newspaper in civil court (although she wasn't the writer of the content at issue). Her bank accounts and other assets were seized in the course of the proceedings. The affair triggered a large outcry throughout the media and the Italian journalistic community.

On 25 April 2010, De Gregorio was honored with the Renato Benedetto Fabrizi prize by the Associazione Nazionale dei Partigiani d'Italia. The following year, she published the essay Così è la vita ('Such Is Life'). From 2013 to 2016 she hosted the Rai 3 literature and culture program Pane quotidiano ('Daily Bread'). In September 2018, along with Daniela Amenta, she co-hosted the program Cactus, basta poca acqua on Radio Capital. In 2021, with David Parenzo, she co-hosted the summer edition of In onda on La7, and went on to host the winter edition as well.

== Personal life ==
De Gregorio is married to Alessandro Cecioni and has four children.

== Written works ==
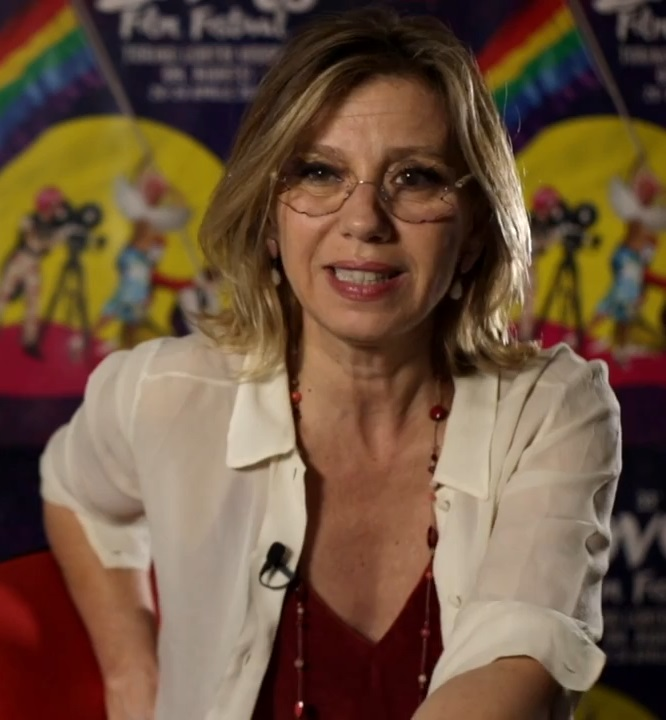
Concita De Gregorio in 2018

=== Books ===
- Non lavate questo sangue. I giorni di Genova. Roma-Bari: Laterza. 2001.
- Una madre lo sa. Tutte le ombre dell'amore perfetto. Milano: Mondadori. 2006. ISBN 978-88-04-56050-0.
- Malamore. Esercizi di resistenza al dolore. Milano: Mondadori. 2008.
- Un paese senza tempo. Fatti e figure in vent'anni di cronache italiane. Milano: Il Saggiatore. 2010.
- Così è la vita. Imparare a dirsi addio. Torino: Einaudi. 2011.
- Io vi maledico. Torino: Einaudi. 2013.
- Un giorno sull'isola. In viaggio con Lorenzo. Torino: Einaudi. 2014.
- Mi sa che fuori è primavera [The Missing Word]. Milano: Feltrinelli. 2015. A novel based on the disappearance of Alessia and Livia Schepp. Premio Brancati 2016.
- Cosa pensano le ragazze. Torino: Einaudi. 2016.
- Nella notte. Milano: Feltrinelli. 2019.
- In tempo di guerra. Torino: Einaudi. 2019.
- Lettera a una ragazza del futuro. Milano: Feltrinelli. 2021.
- Un'ultima cosa. Milano: Feltrinelli. 2022.
- Di madre in figlia. Milano: Feltrinelli. 2025.
- La cura. Einaudi Stile Libero. 2026.

==== Prefaces ====
- Rosalind B. Penfold (2006). Le pantofole dell'orco. Storia di un amore crudele. Milano: Sperling & Kupfer.
- Ascanio Celestini (2008). La pecora nera. Elogio funebre del manicomio elettrico. Torino: Einaudi.
- Elizabeth Lightfoot (2009). Michelle Obama. First lady della speranza. Roma: Nutrimenti.
- Oriana Fallaci (2009). Penelope alla guerra. Milano: BUR.
- Anais Ginori (2010). Pensare l'impossibile. Donne che non si arrendono. Roma: Fandango.

==== Contributions ====
- Giovanni Maria Bellu; Silvia Sanna (2010). "Introduzione". 100 giorni sull'isola dei cassintegrati. Nuoro: Il maestrale.
- Nicla Vassallo; Marnia Lazreg (2011). "La velata". Sul velo. Lettere aperte alle donne musulmane. Milano: Il Saggiatore. pp. 11–48.

=== Audiobooks ===
- Concita De Gregorio (2012). Così è la vita. Imparare a dirsi addio. Roma: Emons Audiolibri.

=== Publications ===
- De Gregorio, Concita; Vassallo, Nicla (January 2011). "Donne e oppressioni tra Occidente, Oriente, Islam. Sui meccanismi di controllo dei corpi femminili". Ragion Pratica (2). Bologna: Il Mulino: 403–416.

== Television programs ==
- Pane quotidiano (2013–2016)
- FuoriRoma (2016–2018)
- Da Venezia è tutto (2017)
- In onda (2021–present)

== Radio ==
- Cactus - Basta poca acqua (2018–2020)
