= Giacomo Marramao =

Italian philosopher (born 1946)

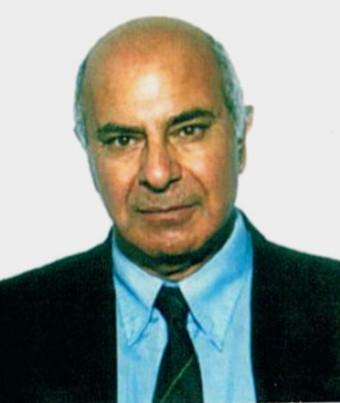
- Born: 1946 (age 79–80); Catanzaro, Italy
- Education: University of Florence

Giacomo Marramao (born 1946) is an Italian philosopher who teaches theoretical philosophy and political philosophy at the Roma Tre University in Rome.

== Education ==
Marramao studied at the University of Florence where he graduated in philosophy under Eugenio Garin's guidance in 1969, and he was Fellow Scholar on behalf of the Italian CNR and the Humboldt Foundation at the Goethe University Frankfurt (1971–1975).

== Early career ==
Between 1976 and 1995, he was professor of Philosophy of politics and of History of Political Doctrines at Naples Eastern University.

He was a visiting professor at various European and American universities: Paris (Sorbonne, SciencesPo, Nanterre), Berlin (Freie Universität), London (Warburg Institute), Vienna, Madrid (Complutense), Barcelona (UB, UAB), Santander, Oviedo, Murcia, Granada, Maiorca, Sevilla, New York (Columbia University), University of California, Berkeley, University of California, Irvine, Texas A&M University, Stony Brook University, Mexico City (UNAM), Buenos Aires (UBA), Rosario, Cordoba, Rio de Janeiro (Universidade Federal), San Paolo (SPSU), Brasilia, Porto Alegre (Unisinos), Belo Horizonte.

At the beginning of the 1980s he was co-founder of influential magazines such as Laboratorio politico and Il Centauro. He is currently director (with Silvana Borutti) of the philosophical journal Paradigmi.

== Current activities ==
He is now professor of Theoretical and Political Philosophy at the Department of Philosophy, Communication and Performing Arts of the Roma Tre University, member of the Collège international de philosophie of Paris, professor honoris causa at the University of Bucharest and Visiting Professor of Political Theory in Paris (Sciences Po.). He is Director (with Silvana Borutti) of Paradigmi - a magazine of critical philosophy – and Director of the Fondazione Basso in Rome. He is also a supporter of the Campaign for the Establishment of a United Nations Parliamentary Assembly, an organisation which campaigns for democratic reform in the United Nations. Many of his books have been translated into foreign languages, such as Kairos: Towards an Ontology of Due Time (Davies), The Passage West: Philosophy After the Age of the Nation State (Verso), Against the Power: Philosophy and Writing (John Cabot University Press), The Bewitched World of Capital (Brill – forthcoming).

Awards: in 2005, the Presidency of the French Republic has awarded him with the "Palmes Académiques". In 2009, he received the International Price of Philosophy "Karl-Otto Apel", and in 2013 the title of Doctor honoris causa by the National University of Córdoba (Argentine).

== Awards ==
In 2005, the Presidency of the French Republic has awarded him with the "Palmes Académiques". In 2009, he received the International Price of Philosophy "Karl-Otto Apel", and in 2013 the title of Doctor honoris causa by the National University of Córdoba (Argentina).

== Works ==
In his book Marxism and Revisionism in Italy (1971), Marramao asserts Giovanni Gentile's thought as the philosophical keystone of Italian Marxism. He is the author of The Political and the Transformations (1979) and Power and Secularization (1985). He has been one of the most important re-discoverers of Carl Schmitt's thought and of decisionism.

In 2006 a collection of essays was published to celebrate his 60th birthday (Figure del conflitto, Valter Casini Editore, Roma), with international contributions by, among others: Remo Bodei, Massimo Cacciari, Franco Rella, Manfred Frank, Jean L. Cohen, Adriana Cavarero, Homi K. Bhabha, Antonio Negri, Rüdiger Bubner, Axel Honneth, Marc Augé, Manuel Cruz, Jorge E. Dotti, and Salvador Giner.

In 2015, to Marramao's thesis on the "philosophy of globalization" was devoted an entire issue of the US magazine "Politica Común": On Giacomo Marramao's "The Passage West", University of Michigan Library, Ann Arbor (with contributions of Peter Baker, Stefano Franchi, Martin Jay, Andy Lantz, Manuela Marchesini, Alberto Moreiras, Pedro Ángel Palou, Carlos Rodríguez, Teresa M. Vilarós, Hayden White, and with a broad response of Marramao). Of this volume was published an Italian edition: Filosofia dei mondi globali. Conversazioni con Giacomo Marramao, ed. by Stefano Franchi and Manuela Marchesini, Bollati Boringhieri, Torino 2017 (ISBN 978-88-339-2845-6).

== Philosophical stance ==
Starting from the study of Italian and European Marxism (Marxism and Revisionism in Italy, 1971; Austro-Marxism and left wing Socialism between the two Wars, 1977), Marramao has analysed the political categories of modernity suggesting – on the same wavelength as the Frankfurt School (The political and its transformations, 1979) and Max Weber (The disenchanted order, 1985)– an innovative symbolic-genealogical reconstruction of them. According to this view, which recovers Karl Löwith's historical-philosophical hypothesis, in modern forms of social organizations there are settled meanings deriving from a process of secularization of religious contents – that is, the re-proposal of the Christian symbolic horizon inside a worldly dimension. In particular, secularization finds its centre in a process of "temporalization of history" thanks to which the categories of time (that translate Christian eschatology into a generic opening to the future: progress, revolution, liberation, etc.) gain an increasing centrality in the political representations of Modernity.

Based on these reflections, also exposed in After the Leviathan, 1995 (third edition in 2013) and The Passion of the Present, 2008, a clear thematization of the philosophical problem of time has grown up. In opposition to Henri Bergson's and Martin Heidegger's views, which delineate with different shades a pure form of temporality, more original than its representations and spatializations, Marramao declares that the link time-space is inseparable and, also connecting to contemporary Physics, he asserts that the structure of Time possesses an aporetic and impure profile, compared to which the dimension of space is the formal reference necessary to think its paradoxes (Minima temporalia, 1990, new edition in 2005; Kairos: Towards an Ontology of Due Time, 1992, new edition in 2005).

== Sources ==
- Storia della filosofia, vol. 14: Filosofi italiani contemporanei, Bompiani, Milan, 2008, pp. 328–339 (ISBN 9788845264474)
- AAVV, Enciclopedia di filosofia, Garzanti libri, Milan, 2004;
- Benso S., Marramao’s Kairós: The Space of “Our” Time in the Time of Cosmic Disorientation, in “Human Studies”, anno 2008, n. 31
- A. Baird, History and Kairos, in “History and Theory”, Vol. 50, Issue 1, pp. 120–128
- AA.VV., Figure del conflitto. Studi in onore di Giacomo Marramao, a cura di A. Martinengo, Valter Casini Editore, Roma, 2006.

== Bibliography ==
- "Theory of the Crisis and the Problem of Constitution". Telos 26 (Winter 1975–76). New York: Telos Press.
- Il politico e le trasformazioni, De Donato, Bari 1979 – Spanish translation, Lo político y las transformaciones, Siglo XXI, México City 1982 (ISBN 968231092X); Portuguese translation, O Político e as transformaçoes, Officina de Livros, Belo Horizonte 1990
- Potere e secolarizzazione [I ed. 1983], new edited and extended edition, Bollati Boringhieri, Torino 2005 (ISBN 8833915824) – German translation, Macht und Säkularisierung, Verlag Neue Kritik, Frankfurt am Main 1989 (ISBN 3801502074); Spanish translation, Poder y secularización, Península, Barcelona 1989 (ISBN 9788429729238); Portuguese translation, Poder e secularização, Unesp, São Paulo 1995 (ISBN 8571390843)
- Minima temporalia. Tempo, spazio, esperienza [I ed. 1990], new edited and extended edition, Sossella, Roma 2005 (ISBN 8887995850) – German translation, Minima temporalia. Zeit, Raum, Erfahrung, Passagen Verlag, Wien 1992 (ISBN 3900767823); Spanish translation, Minima temporalia. Tiempo, espacio, experiencia, Gedísa, Barcelona 2009 (ISBN 9788497841863)
- Kairós. Apologia del tempo debito [I ed. 1992], new edition. Laterza, Roma-Bari 2005 (ISBN 884204122X) – English translation, Kairós: Towards an Ontology of Due Time, The Davies Group Publishers, Aurora (CO) 2006 (ISBN 1888570377), Spanish translation, Kairós. Apología del tiempo oportuno, Gedísa, Barcelona 2008 (ISBN 9788497842259)
- Cielo e terra, Laterza, Roma-Bari 1994 (ISBN 8842043621) – Spanish translation, Cielo y tierra, Paidós, Barcelona-Buenos Aires-México 1998 (ISBN 8449305152); Portuguese translation, Céu e terra, Unesp, São Paulo 1997 (ISBN 8571391122); German translation, Die Säkularisierung der westlichen Welt, Insel, Frankfurt am Main 1996 (ISBN 3458342591); French translation, Ciel et terre, Bayard, Paris 2006 (ISBN 2227473754)
- Dopo il Leviatano. Individuo e comunità [I ed. 1995], Third revised and expanded edition, Bollati Boringhieri, Torino 2013 (ISBN 8833912590)
- Passaggio a Occidente. Filosofia e globalizzazione, Bollati Boringhieri, Torino 2003 (ISBN 8833912566) – Spanish translation, Pasaje a Occidente, Katz Editores, Buenos Aires 2006 (ISBN 9871283318); English translation, The Passage West, Verso, London-New York, 2012.
- La passione del presente, Bollati Boringhieri, Torino 2008 (ISBN 978-88-339-1832-7). – Spanish translation: La pasión del presente, Gedisa, Barcelona 2011 (ISBN 978-84-9784-350-8);
- Contro il potere. Filosofia e scrittura, Bompiani, Milan 2011 (ISBN 9788845267383) – Spanish translation: Contra el poder, Fondo de Cultura Economica, Buenos Aires 2013 (ISBN 978-950-557-981-5) / English translation: Against Power: For an Overhaul of Critical Theory, John Cabot University Press-Rowman&Littlefield-University of Delaware Press, Lanham-Newark 2016 (ISBN 978-1-61149-619-2).
- L’esperimento del mondo. Mistica e filosofia nell’arte di Fabio Mauri, Bollati Boringhieri, Torino 2018 (ISBN 978-88-339-3029-9).
- Per un nuovo Rinascimento, Castelvecchi, Roma 2020 (ISBN 978-88-328-2855-9).
- Sulla sindrome populista, Castelvecchi, Roma 2020 (ISBN 978-88-3290-066-8); Spanish translation: Sobre el síndrome populista, Prólogo de Ínigo Errejón, Gedísa, Barcelona-Buenos Aires-México 2020 (ISBN 978-84-18193-75-0).
- Interregnum. Between Biopolitics and Posthegemony, Mimesis International, Milan-Udine 2020 (ISBN 978-88-6977-261-0).
- Kairós. Apologia del tempo debito, new expanded edition, Bollati Boringhieri, Turin 2020 (ISBN 978-88-339-2597-4).
- The Bewitched World of Capital: the Political and the Transformations, Brill (forthcoming).
