= Fortuna =

Ancient Roman goddess of fortune and luck

- Goddess of Fortune, Chance, Luck, and Fate
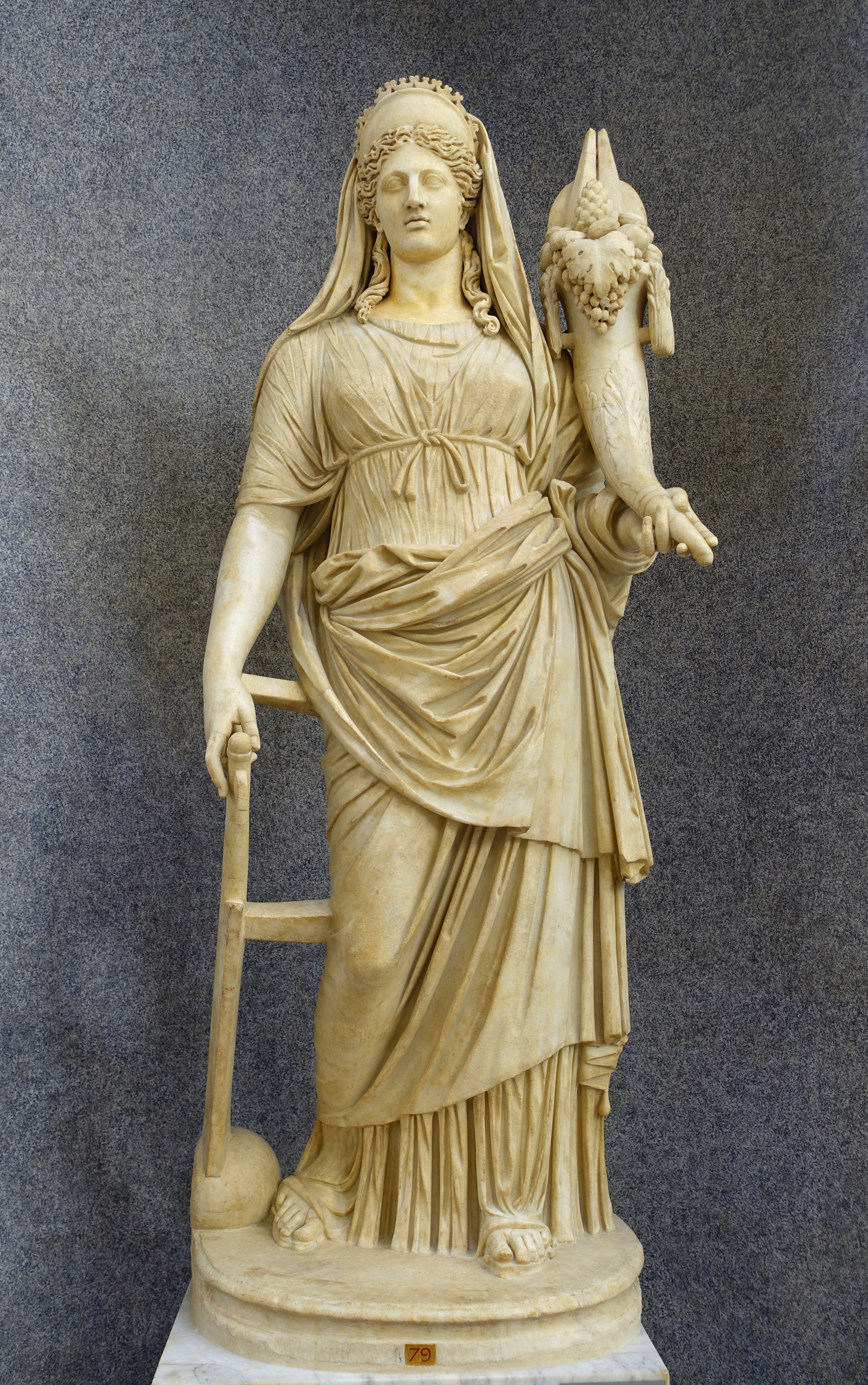
- Abode: Rome
- Symbol: Globe, Cornucopia, Wheel, ball, Wreath

Equivalents
- Greek: Tyche

Fortuna (Latin: Fortūna), sometimes anglicized as Fortune, is the goddess of luck or fortune in Roman religion. She came to represent life's capriciousness, and was a goddess of fate. In antiquity she was also known by the epithet Automatia (Latin: Automatia; Greek: Αὐτοματία, "she who does what she will"). Her Greek equivalent is Tyche.

Fortuna was often depicted with a gubernaculum (ship's rudder), a ball or wheel of fortune (first mentioned by Cicero) and a horn of plenty. She could be represented as veiled and blind, as in modern depictions of Lady Justice, except that Fortuna does not hold a balance. She was believed to bring either fortune or misfortune: As Atrox Fortuna ("Cruel Fortune"), she was said to have claimed the young lives of the princeps Augustus' grandsons Gaius and Lucius, prospective heirs to the Empire.

Fortuna remained popular through the Middle Ages until at least the Renaissance, largely thanks to the late antique author Boethius, in whose work she appears as a personification of the hidden will of God. The blindfolded depiction of her is still an important figure in many aspects of modern Italian culture, where the dichotomy of fortuna (good luck, fortune) and sfortuna (bad luck, misfortune) plays a prominent role in everyday social life, as represented in the common maxim La (dea) fortuna è cieca, "(The goddess) Luck is blind" (Latin Fortuna caeca est).

== Ancient cult ==
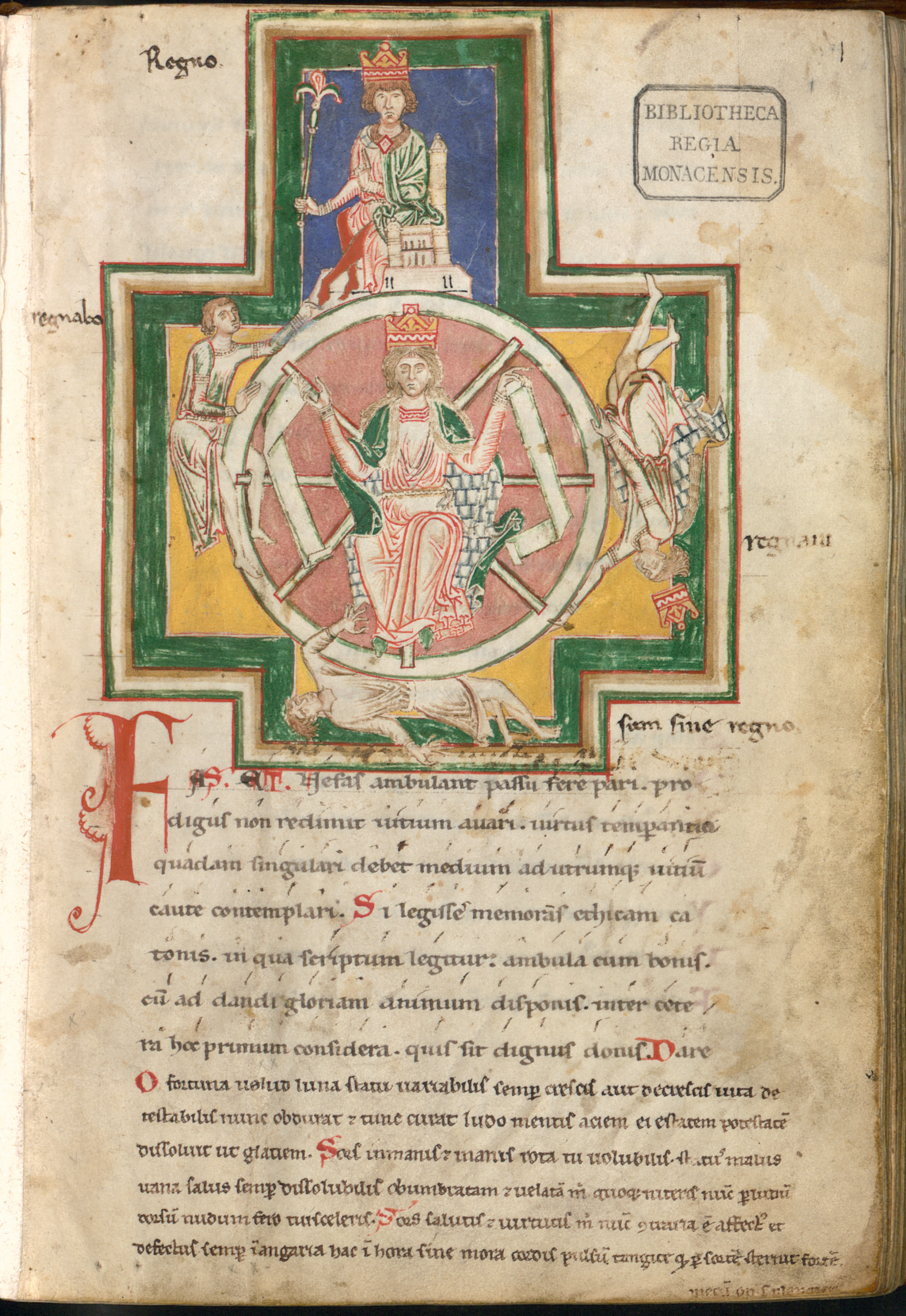
Fortuna governs the circle of the four stages of life, the Wheel of Fortune, in a manuscript of Carmina Burana

Heraldic Fortuna in the arms of Glückstadt.

Fortuna's father was said to be Jupiter and like him, she could also be bountiful (Copia). As Annonaria she protected grain supplies. June 11 was consecrated to her: on June 24 she was given cult at the festival of Fors Fortuna. Fortuna's name seems to derive from Vortumna (she who revolves the year).

Roman writers disagreed whether her cult was introduced to Rome by Servius Tullius or Ancus Marcius. The two earliest temples mentioned in Roman Calendars were outside the city, on the right bank of the Tiber (in Italian Trastevere). The first temple dedicated to Fortuna was attributed to the Etruscan Servius Tullius, while the second is known to have been built in 293 BC as the fulfilment of a Roman promise made during later Etruscan wars. The date of dedication of her temples was 24 June, or Midsummer's Day, when celebrants from Rome annually floated to the temples downstream from the city. After undisclosed rituals they then rowed back, garlanded and inebriated. Also Fortuna had a temple at the Forum Boarium. Here Fortuna was twinned with the cult of Mater Matuta (the goddesses shared a festival on 11 June), and the paired temples have been revealed in the excavation beside the church of Sant'Omobono: the cults are indeed archaic in date. Fortuna Primigenia of Praeneste was adopted by Romans at the end of 3rd century BC in an important cult of Fortuna Publica Populi Romani (the Official Good Luck of the Roman People) on the Quirinalis outside the Porta Collina. No temple at Rome, however, rivalled the magnificence of the Praenestine sanctuary.

Fortuna's identity as personification of chance events was closely tied to virtus (strength of character). Public officials who lacked virtues invited ill-fortune on themselves and Rome: Sallust uses the infamous Catiline as illustration – "Truly, when in the place of work, idleness, in place of the spirit of measure and equity, caprice and pride invade, fortune is changed just as with morality".

An oracle at the Temple of Fortuna Primigenia in Praeneste used a form of divination in which a small boy picked out one of various futures that were written on oak rods. Cults to Fortuna in her many forms are attested throughout the Roman world. Dedications have been found to Fortuna Dubia (doubtful fortune), Fortuna Brevis (fickle or wayward fortune) and Fortuna Mala (bad fortune).

Fortuna is found in a variety of domestic and personal contexts. During the early Empire, an amulet from the House of Menander in Pompeii links her to the Egyptian goddess Isis, as Isis-Fortuna. She is functionally related to the god Bonus Eventus, who is often represented as her counterpart: both appear on amulets and intaglio engraved gems across the Roman world. In the context of the early Roman Republic account of Coriolanus, in around 488 BC the Roman senate dedicated a temple to Fortuna on account of the services of the matrons of Rome in saving the city from destruction. Evidence of Fortuna worship has been found as far north as Castlecary, Scotland and an altar and statue can now be viewed at the Hunterian Museum in Glasgow.

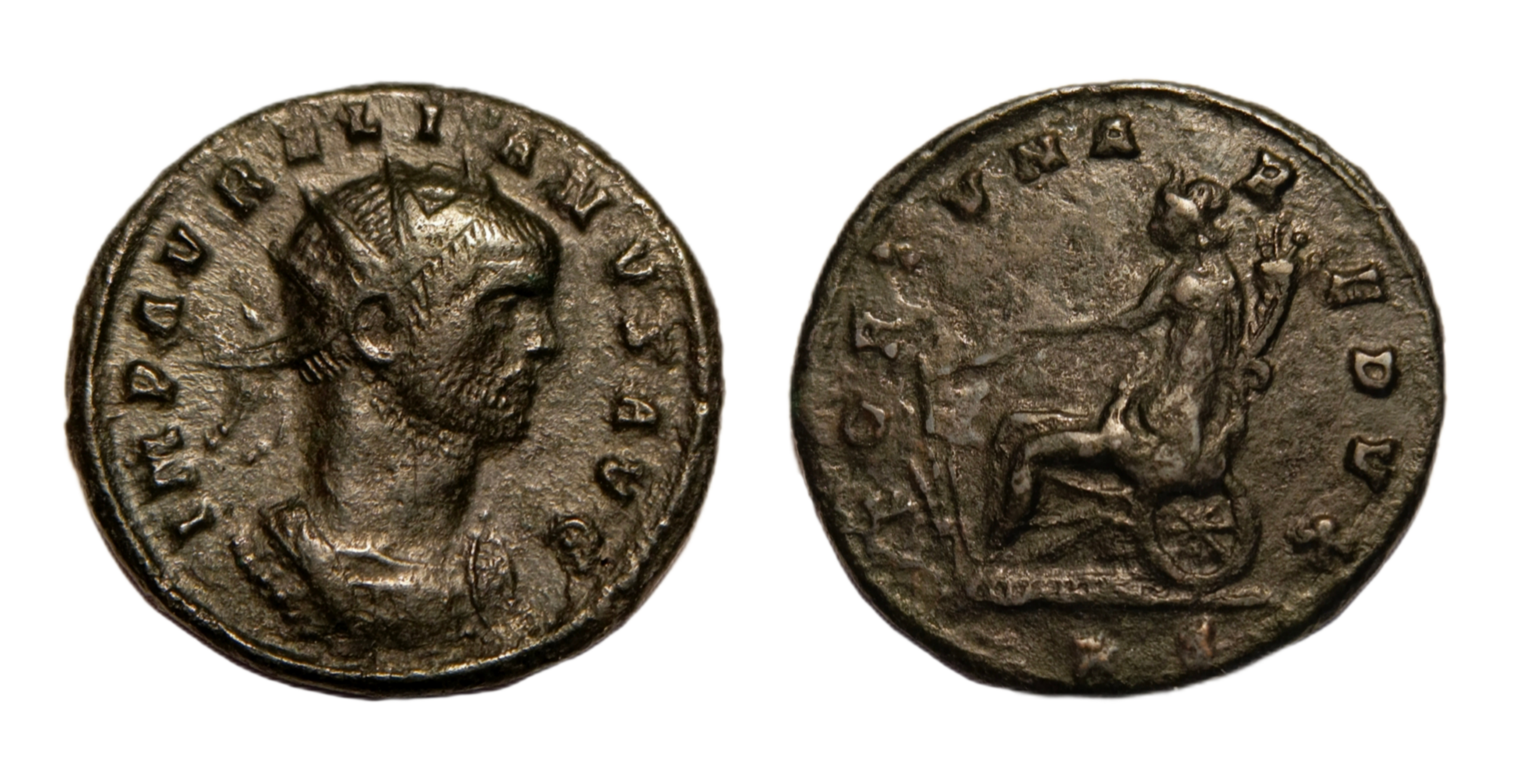
Fortuna on the reverse of a Roman coin of the Emperor Aurelian.

The earliest reference to the Wheel of Fortune, emblematic of the endless changes in life between prosperity and disaster, is from 55 BC. In Seneca's tragedy Agamemnon, a chorus addresses Fortuna in terms that would remain almost proverbial, and in a high heroic ranting mode that Renaissance writers would emulate:

O Fortune, who dost bestow the throne's high boon with mocking hand, in dangerous and doubtful state thou settest the too exalted. Never have sceptres obtained calm peace or certain tenure; care on care weighs them down, and ever do fresh storms vex their souls. ... great kingdoms sink of their own weight, and Fortune gives way 'neath the burden of herself. Sails swollen with favouring breezes fear blasts too strongly theirs; the tower which rears its head to the very clouds is beaten by rainy Auster. ... Whatever Fortune has raised on high, she lifts but to bring low. Modest estate has longer life; then happy he whoe'er, content with the common lot, with safe breeze hugs the shore, and, fearing to trust his skiff to the wider sea, with unambitious oar keeps close to land.

Ovid's description is typical of Roman representations: in a letter from exile he reflects ruefully on the "goddess who admits by her unsteady wheel her own fickleness; she always has its apex beneath her swaying foot."

== Middle Ages and Renaissance ==
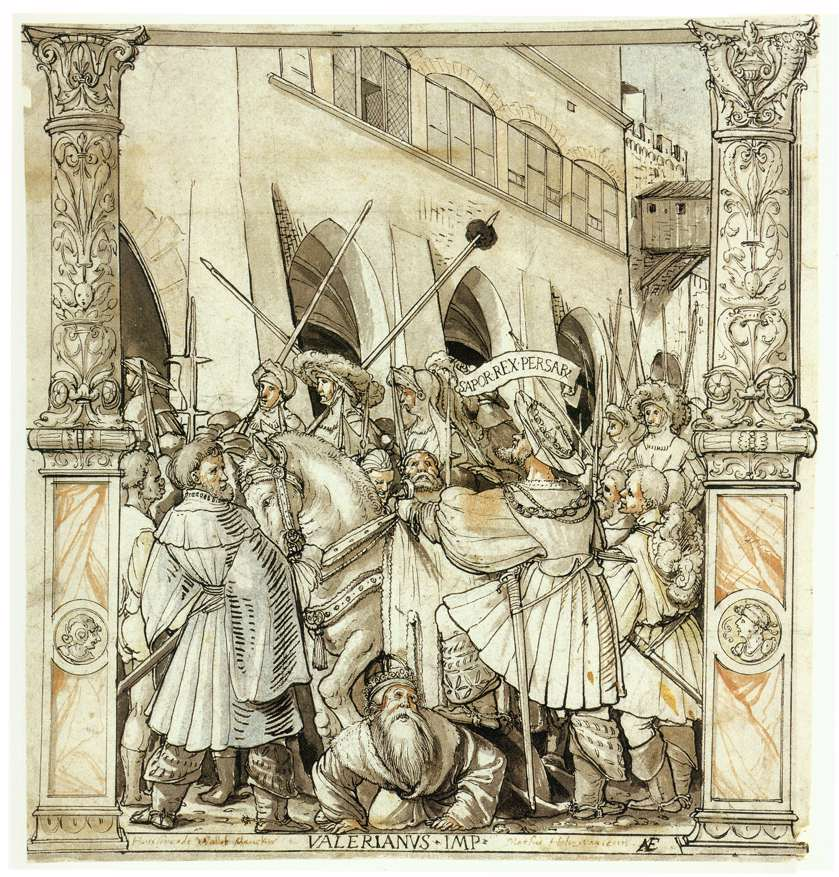
The humiliation of Emperor Valerian by king Shapur I of Persia (260) passed into European cultural memory as an instance of the reversals of Fortuna. In Hans Holbein's pen-and-ink drawing (1521), the universal lesson is brought home by its contemporary setting.

Fortuna did not disappear from the popular imagination with the ascendancy of Christianity. Saint Augustine took a stand against her continuing presence, in the City of God: "How, therefore, is she good, who without discernment comes to both the good and to the bad?...It profits one nothing to worship her if she is truly fortune... let the bad worship her...this supposed deity". In the 6th century, the Consolation of Philosophy, by statesman and philosopher Boethius, written while he faced execution, reflected the Christian theology of casus, that the apparently random and often ruinous turns of Fortune's Wheel are in fact both inevitable and providential, that even the most coincidental events are part of God's hidden plan which one should not resist or try to change. Fortuna, then, was a servant of God, and events, individual decisions, the influence of the stars were all merely vehicles of Divine Will. In succeeding generations Boethius' Consolation was required reading for scholars and students. Fortune crept back into popular acceptance, with a new iconographic trait, "two-faced Fortune", Fortuna bifrons; such depictions continue into the 15th century.

The ubiquitous image of the Wheel of Fortune found throughout the Middle Ages and beyond was a direct legacy of the second book of Boethius's Consolation. The Wheel appears in many renditions from tiny miniatures in manuscripts to huge stained glass windows in cathedrals, such as at Amiens. Lady Fortune is usually represented as larger than life to underscore her importance. The wheel characteristically has four shelves, or stages of life, with four human figures, usually labeled on the left regnabo (I shall reign), on the top regno (I reign) and is usually crowned, descending on the right regnavi (I have reigned) and the lowly figure on the bottom is marked sum sine regno (I have no kingdom). Medieval representations of Fortune emphasize her duality and instability, such as two faces side by side like Janus; one face smiling the other frowning; half the face white the other black; she may be blindfolded but without scales, blind to justice. She was associated with the cornucopia, ship's rudder, the ball and the wheel. The cornucopia is where plenty flows from, the Helmsman's rudder steers fate, the globe symbolizes chance (who gets good or bad luck), and the wheel symbolizes that luck, good or bad, never lasts.

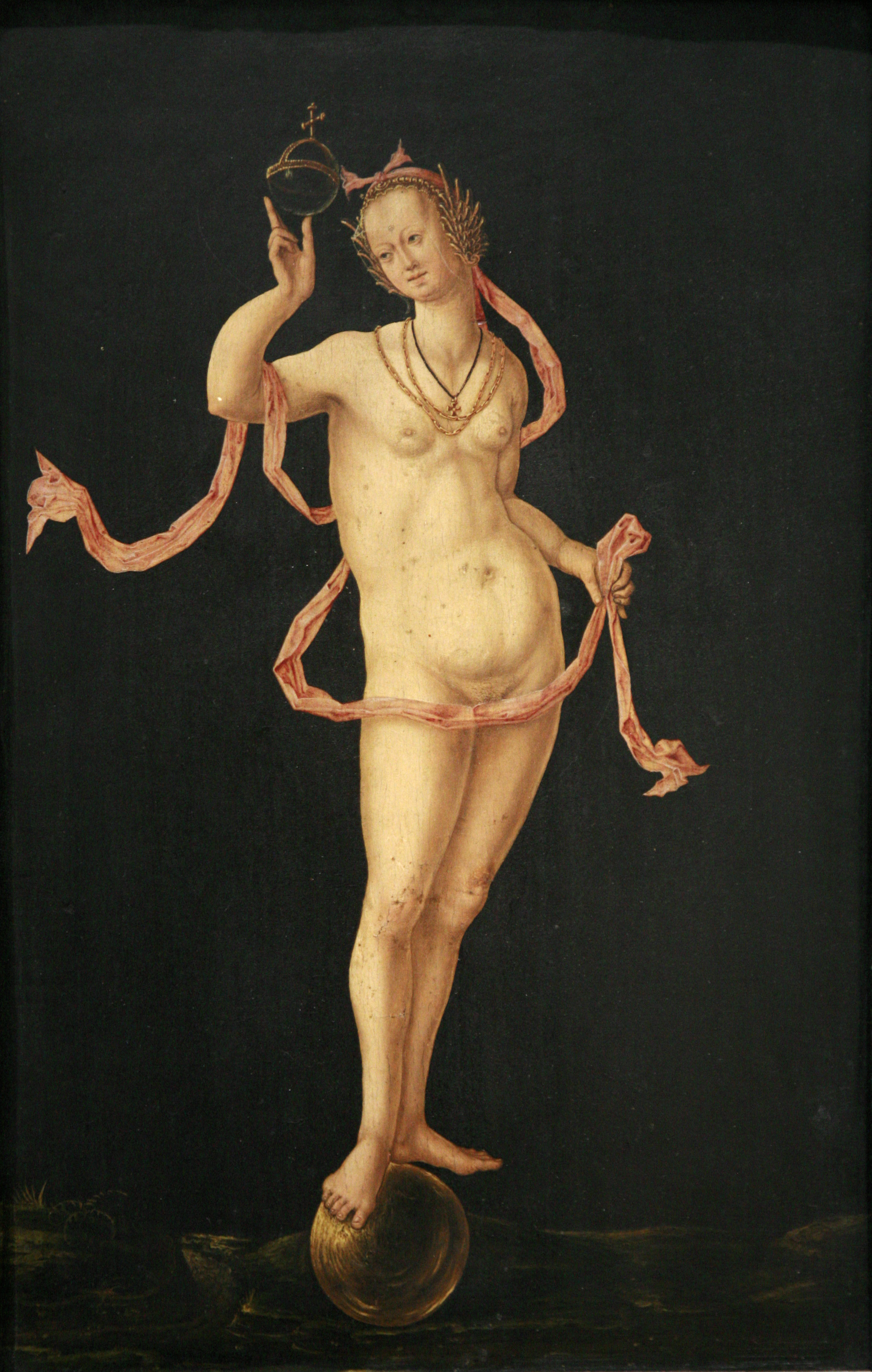
Fortuna lightly balances the orb of sovereignty between thumb and finger in a Dutch painting of ca 1530 (Musée des Beaux-Arts de Strasbourg)

Fortune would have many influences in cultural works throughout the Middle Ages. In Le Roman de la Rose, Fortune frustrates the hopes of a lover who has been helped by a personified character "Reason". In Dante's Inferno (vii.67-96), Virgil explains the nature of Fortune, both a devil and a ministering angel, subservient to God. Boccaccio's De Casibus Virorum Illustrium ("The Fortunes of Famous Men"), used by John Lydgate to compose his Fall of Princes, tells of many where the turn of Fortune's wheel brought those most high to disaster, and Boccaccio essay De remedii dell'una e dell'altra Fortuna, depends upon Boethius for the double nature of Fortuna. Fortune makes her appearance in Carmina Burana (see image). The Christianized Lady Fortune is not autonomous: illustrations for Boccaccio's Remedii show Fortuna enthroned in a triumphal car with reins that lead to heaven.

Fortuna also appears in chapter 25 of Machiavelli's The Prince, in which he says Fortune only rules one half of men's fate, the other half being of their own will. Machiavelli reminds the reader that Fortune is a woman, that she favours a strong, ambitious hand, and that she favours the more aggressive and bold young man than a timid elder. Monteverdi's opera L'incoronazione di Poppea features Fortuna, contrasted with the goddess Virtue. Even Shakespeare was no stranger to Lady Fortune:

When in disgrace with Fortune and men's eyes
I all alone beweep my outcast state...

— Sonnet 29

Ignatius J. Reilly, the protagonist in the famous John Kennedy Toole novel A Confederacy of Dunces, identifies Fortuna as the agent of change in his life. A verbose, preposterous medievalist, Ignatius is of the mindset that he does not belong in the world and that his numerous failings are the work of some higher power. He continually refers to Fortuna as having spun him downwards on her wheel of luck, as in "Oh, Fortuna, you degenerate wanton!"

The Wheel of Fortune also has concerns with occultism and Satanism.

== Pars Fortuna in astrology ==
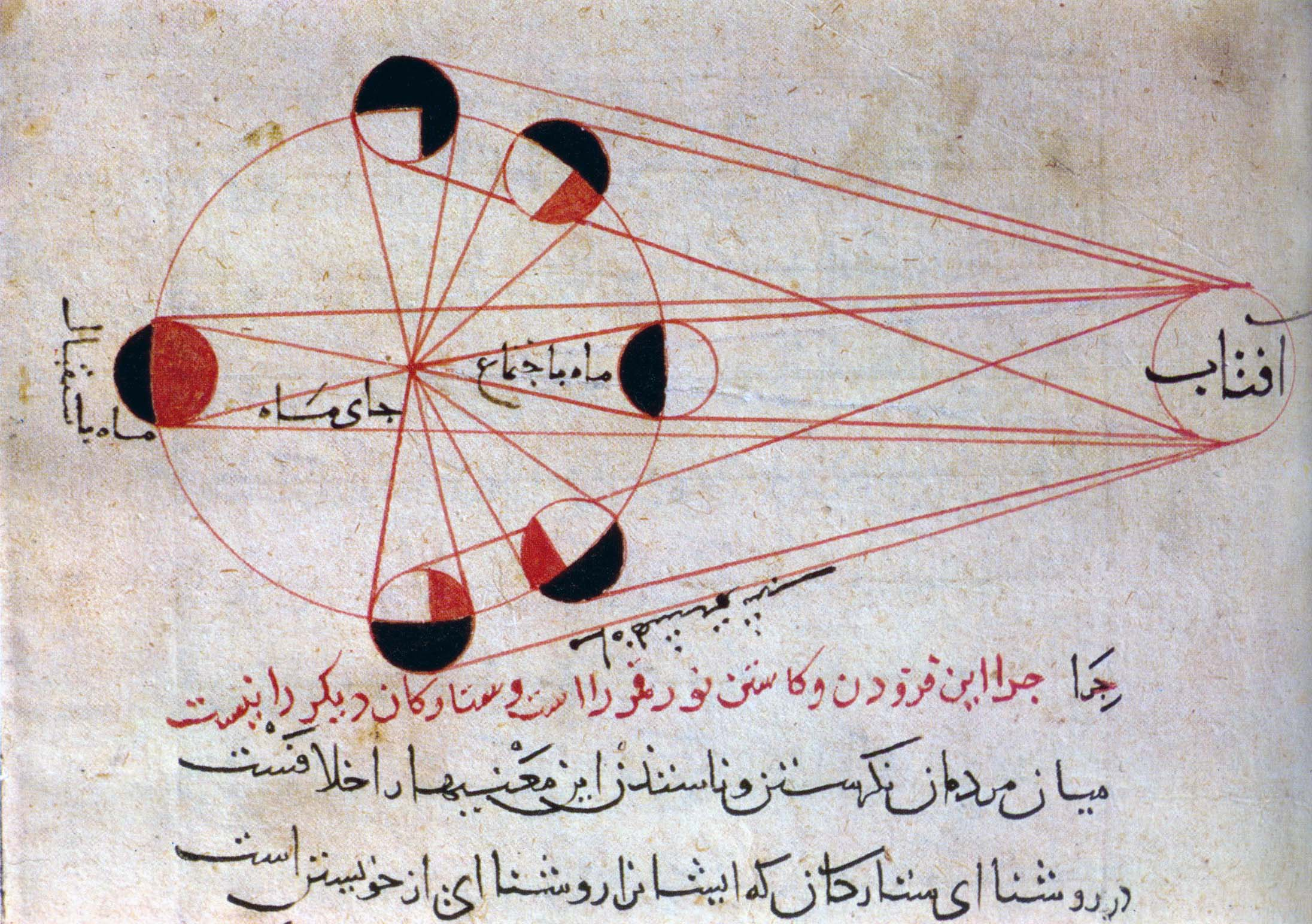
illustration by Al-Biruni (973–1048) of different phases of the Moon, from the Persian Kitab al-tafhim

In astrology, the term Pars Fortuna represents a mathematical point in the zodiac derived by the longitudinal positions of the Sun, Moon and Ascendant (Rising sign) in the birth chart of an individual. It represents an especially beneficial point in the horoscopic chart. In Arabic astrology, this and similar points are called Arabian Parts.

Al-Biruni (973–1048), an 11th-century mathematician, astronomer, and scholar, who was the greatest proponent of this system of prediction, listed a total of 97 Arabic Parts, which were widely used for astrological consultations.

== Aspects ==
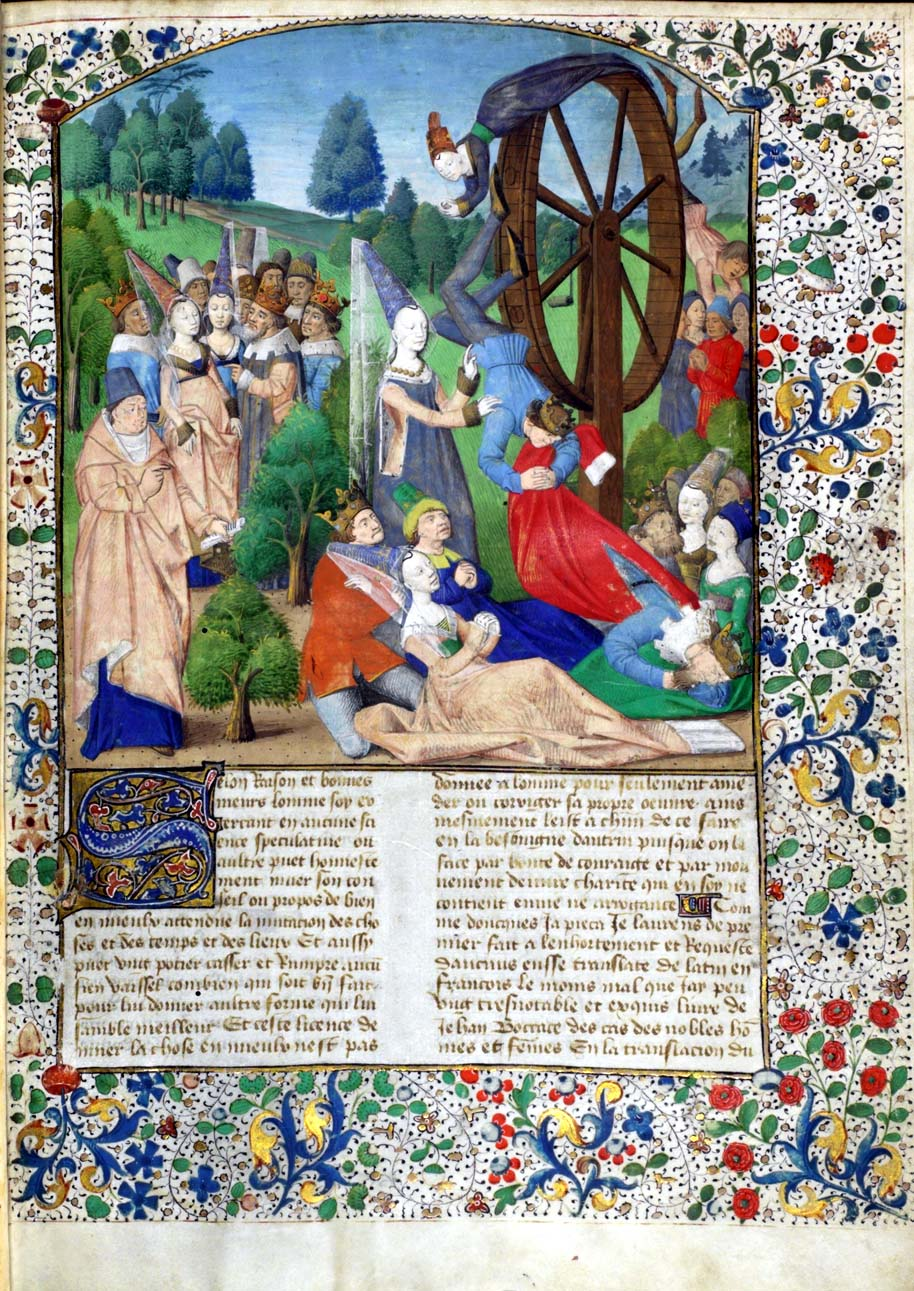
Lady Fortune in a Boccaccio manuscript

- Fortuna Annonaria brought the luck of the harvest.
- Fortuna Primigenia directed the fortune of a firstborn child at the moment of birth.
- Fortuna Virilis ("Luck in person's"), a person's luck in marriage.
- Fortuna Redux brought one safely home.
- Fortuna Respiciens The fortune of the provider.
- Fortuna Muliebris The luck of a person.
- Fortuna Balnearis The fortune of the baths.
- Fortuna Conservatrix The fortune of the preserver.
- Fortuna Equestris The fortune of the knights.
- Fortuna Huiusce Diei The fortune of the present day.
- Fortuna Obsequens The fortune of indulgence.
- Fortuna Privata The fortune of the private individual.
- Fortuna Publica The fortune of the people.
- Fortuna Romana The fortune of Rome.
- Fortuna Virgo The fortune of the virgin.
- Fortuna Faitrix The fortune of life.
- Fortuna Barbata The fortune of adolescents becoming adults.

== See also ==
- Fortune favours the bold (Fortes fortuna adiuvat)
- Carmina Burana, medieval poems, and Carmina Burana, a symphony by Carl Orff famously addressing Fortuna
- Column of the Goths
- 19 Fortuna
- Piety (Pietas), Hope (Spes), Faithfulness (Fides), other concepts worshipped by the Romans as goddesses

== Notes ==
- David Plant, "Fortune, Spirit and the Lunation Cycle"
- "Homer" (1827) Classical Manual; or, a mythological, historical, and geographical commentary on Pope's Homer and Dryden's Æneid of Virgil, with a copious index. (Longman).
- Howard Rollin Patch (1923), Fortuna in Old French Literature
- Lesley Adkins, Roy A. Adkins (2001) Dictionary of Roman Religion
- Howard Rollin Patch (1927, repr. 1967), The Goddess Fortuna in Medieval Literature
- Howard Rollin Patch (1922), The Tradition of the Goddess Fortuna in Medieval Philosophy and Literature
- J. Champeaux, Fortuna. Vol. I. Recherches sur le culte de la Fortuna à Rome et dans le monde romaine des origines à la mort de César; Vol. II. Les Transformations de Fortuna sous le République (Rome, École Française de Rome, 1982–1987).
- Narducci, Emanuele, Sergio Audano and Luca Fezzi (edd.), Aspetti della Fortuna dell'Antico nella Cultura Europea: atti della quarta giornata di studi, Sestri Levante, 16 marzo 2007 (Pisa: ETS, 2008) (Testi e studi di cultura classica, 41).
- Michele Chiaruzzi (2016), Martin Wight on Fortune and Irony in Politics
