= Zdzisław Raczyński =

Polish diplomat and journalist

Zdzisław A. Raczyński
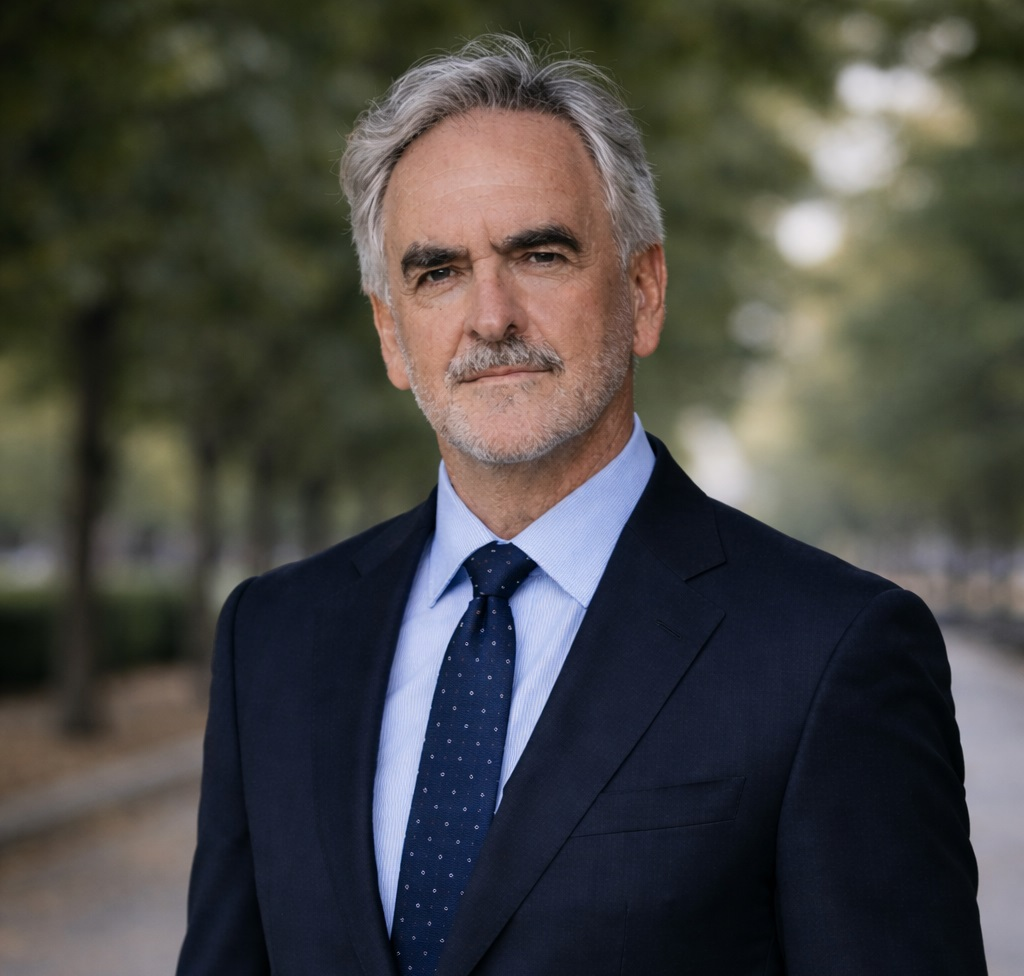
- (2025)

Poland Ambassador to Tunisia
- In office 2004–2007
- Preceded by: Rafał Karpiński
- Succeeded by: Krzysztof Olendzki

3rd Poland Ambassador to Armenia
- In office 2010–2014
- Preceded by: Tomasz Knothe
- Succeeded by: Jerzy Marek Nowakowski

Personal details
- Born: 18 October 1959 (age 66) Werpol, Poland
- Education: University of Warsaw; Moscow State Institute of International Relations
- Profession: Diplomat, novelist, journalist

Zdzisław Aleksander Raczyński (born 18 October 1959 in Werpol) is a Polish diplomat, journalist and novelist, currently serving as and officer in the Ministry of Foreign Affairs (MFA).

== Life ==
He was raised in Siemiatycze. He was educated at University of Warsaw, under the Faculty of Political Science, and graduated in Arab studies at Moscow State Institute of International Relations. From 1990 to 1996 he was the Polish Press Agency foreign correspondent in Moscow. From 1997 to 2000 he was an advisor to the head of the National Security Bureau.

He joined the MFA in May 2001, where he was the director of Eastern Policy Department, then the deputy director of the Europe Department. From 2004 to 2007 he was the Polish ambassador to Tunisia, and from 2010 to 2014 the ambassador to Armenia. From October 2016 and 2021 he was also the leader of the Solidarity Polish trade union unit at the MFA.

As a journalist and novelist, Raczyński published several articles on Russia policy issues and the Arab world. In 2018, he published the novel Harib, about the Libyan Revolution (ISBN 978-83-283-3995-8). His 2021 novel Poppy Seeds on the Eyelids (ISBN 978-83-956355-4-0) is about the Holocaust of a Jewish community in a small town in eastern Poland.
