= Disappearance of Alessia and Livia Schepp =

Case of missing people from Vaud, Switzerland

Alessia Schepp, Livia Schepp
- Born: Alessia Vera Schepp, Livia Clara Schepp; October 7, 2004; Saint-Sulpice
- Disappeared: January 30, 2011 (aged 6); Switzerland
- Status: Missing for 15 years and 21 days
- Parents: Mathias Schepp (father); Irina Lucidi (mother)

Alessia Vera Schepp and Livia Clara Schepp are twin sisters from Saint-Sulpice, a suburb of Lausanne in the canton of Vaud, Switzerland who were last seen on January 30, 2011. Matthias Schepp, their father, picked up his twin daughters from his ex-wife's home in St-Sulpice; they never returned. The body of Matthias was later found in Italy, where the authorities presumed that he had committed suicide. The disappearance of the six-year-old girls led to an unsuccessful search across Switzerland, France and Italy.

== Background ==
Alessia and Livia were twin sisters, born on October 7, 2004, the only children of Irina Mayme Lucidi Schepp, an Italian-born Swiss lawyer, and Matthias Kaspar Schepp, 43, a Canadian-born Swiss engineer. The parents married in July 2004 in Ascoli Piceno, Italy, where they both worked for the tobacco company Philip Morris.

A year before the girls disappeared, the couple had split up, living in separate homes in the same village.

== Timeline ==
The following timeline is based on a Swiss Police publication:

- Friday 28 January: Matthias Schepp picks up his daughters to spend the weekend with them.
- Saturday 29 January: Schepp sends an SMS to his wife: "we are all right, we'll return on Monday".
- Sunday 30 January
  - at 12:00: The girls are seen for the last time with Schepp in Saint-Sulpice, Vaud.
  - at 17:04: Schepp crosses the border into France.
- Monday 31 January
  - at 12:30: Schepp withdraws money from several cashpoints in Marseille.
  - Schepp sends a postcard to his wife from Marseille.
  - Schepp and the girls take an evening ferry to Propriano, in southwest Corsica.
- Tuesday 1 February
  - at 06:30: Schepp disembarks in Propriano, with or without his daughters.
  - at 21:00: Schepp takes a ferry from Bastia in northeast Corsica and arrives at Toulon the next morning at 07:00.
- Wednesday 2 February at 09:13: Schepp is photographed alone at a toll.
- Thursday 3 February
  - at 12:00: Schepp is observed by a witness in Vietri sul Mare not far from Naples, Italy.
  - at 22:47: Schepp threw himself under a train at Cerignola, in the south-east Italian region of Apulia.

== Possible murder by Matthias Schepp ==
In February 2011 police investigators said that Schepp sent a letter to his wife suggesting that he had killed the children. The letter was not released to the public. According to CNN, the Italian newspaper Corriere della Sera was allowed to publish a single sentence from the letters which said "The children rest in peace, they have not suffered". A search of Schepp's computer showed that in the days leading up to the trip, he searched for information about firearms and poisons, along with the timetables for the ferry.

== Novelization ==
In 2015, Italian journalist and writer Concita De Gregorio published a novel, Mi sa che fuori è primavera, based on the girls' disappearance, written from the point of view of Irina Lucidi. De Gregorio received a Brancati Prize for the book in 2016. It was published in English in 2022 as The Missing Word.

== See also ==
- 2011 in Switzerland
- List of people who disappeared mysteriously: post-1970
- Missing Children Switzerland (in French)
