= List of universities in San Marino =

This is a list of universities in San Marino.

- University of the Republic of San Marino is the only recognized university in the microstate.
- The Akademio Internacia de la Sciencoj San Marino was registered in San Marino and organized education services in countries all over Europe; the Akademio was dissolved in 2020.
