= Alberto Moreiras =

Alberto Moreiras is a Spanish-born academic and cultural theorist who currently works at Texas A&M University. Previously he taught at Duke University and at the Centre for Modern Thought at the University of Aberdeen.

His publications include Tercer espacio, The Exhaustion of Difference, and Línea de sombra. He is a scholar interested in Heidegger, Levinas and Derrida. His researches explore negative categories, which are in many ways experimental.

In critic Juan Poblete's words, Moreiras's work "has been characterized thus far by a strong metacritical component whereby theoretical texts are continuously de/constructed in an investigation of both their epistemological status and their general political potential as interventions in a concrete field of forces."

== Bibliography ==
- Moreiras, Alberto (2022). Uncanny Rest: For Antiphilosophy. Durham: Duke University Press.
- Moreiras, Alberto (2021). Tercer espacio y otros relatos.
- Moreiras, Alberto (2016). Marranismo e inscripción, o, El abandono de la conciencia desdichada.
  - English translation: Against abstraction : notes from an ex-Latin Americanist.
- Moreiras, Alberto (2001). The Exhaustion of Difference: The Politics of Latin American Cultural Studies. Durham: Duke University Press.
