= Museo Matris Domini =

Museum in Bergamo, Italy

Coordinates: 45°41′56.7″N 9°40′5.4″E

The Museo Matris Domini is housed in the oldest section of the Dominican convent of the same name, situated in the city centre of Bergamo, Italy. It is administered by the nuns of the foundation.

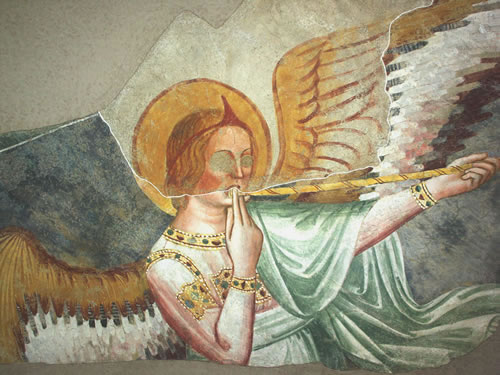
Angel with trumpet

The museum preserves a series of 13th and 14th Century frescoes which were uncovered in a 1973 restoration of what was thought to have been the old refectory and a small church within the monastery. The reappearance of these paintings was highly significant as they are amongst the earliest surviving examples of wall painting in Lombardy.

Outstanding for their pictorial and emotion qualities are fragments from what must have been a depiction of the Last Judgment: the Just, the Blessed, two Angels with trumpets (which are of particular beauty), Saint Peter Enthroned, and Hell, all attributed to the Master of the Tree of Life.

There is another series of frescoes of great emotive and narrative quality, representing Jesus among the Doctors, the Baptism, the Virgin and Child Enthroned, Saint Catherine of Alexandria upon the Wheel, Saint Martin and the Pauper, Jesus entering Jerusalem, and the Miracle of the reanimation of Napoleone Orsini by Saint Dominic, showing the young man falling from his horse. These works, together with the Visitation, have been attributed to the so-called First Master of Abbey of Chiaravalle, an anonymous artist active in Lombardy circa 1320-30, and known only through these works, as well as frescoes in San Marco, Milan and in the eponymous Abbey of Chiaravalle.

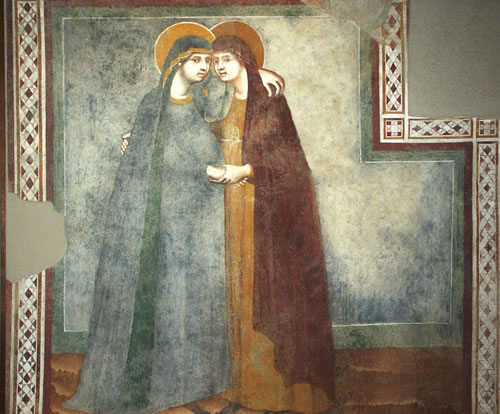
Visitation

The Visitation is a particularly striking image because of its freshness and for the expressiveness of the faces of the Virgin and Saint Elizabeth, painted by the Master with great intelligence and sensitivity. A 16th-century fresco depicting Saint Dominic (the patron of the monastery) with other saints is also featured in the museum.

== The stained glass windows ==
The Museum also has a group of beautiful polychrome glass windows, oculi, dating from the 14th century and originally from the apse of the sanctuary.

Amongst the five windows, the largest is one depicting the Virgin with the Infant Child.

== Gallery ==
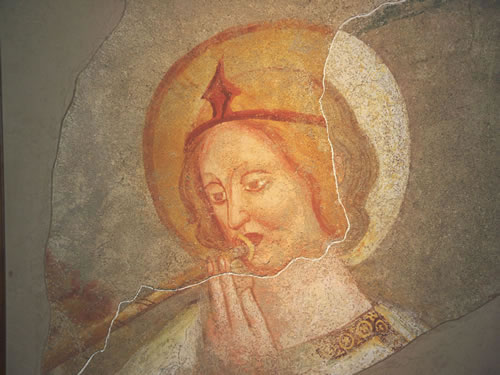
Angel with trumpet

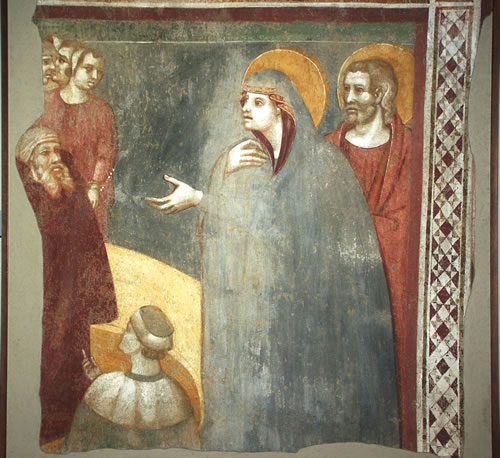
Finding Jesus

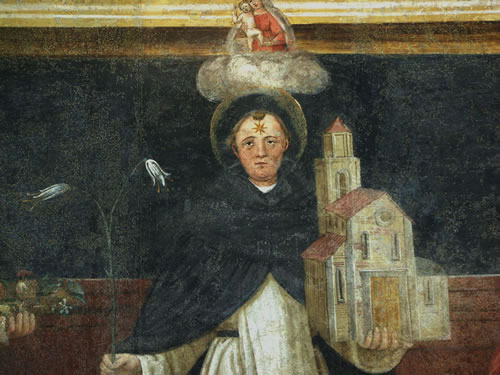
St. Dominic

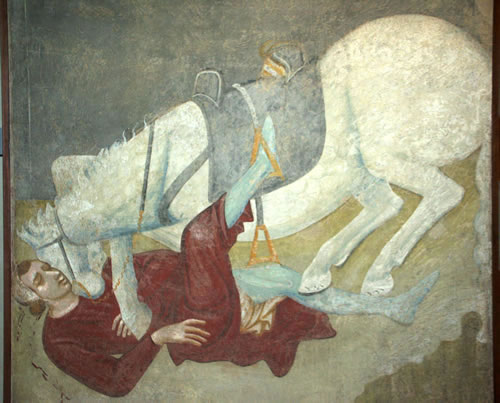
Napoleone Orsini, fallen

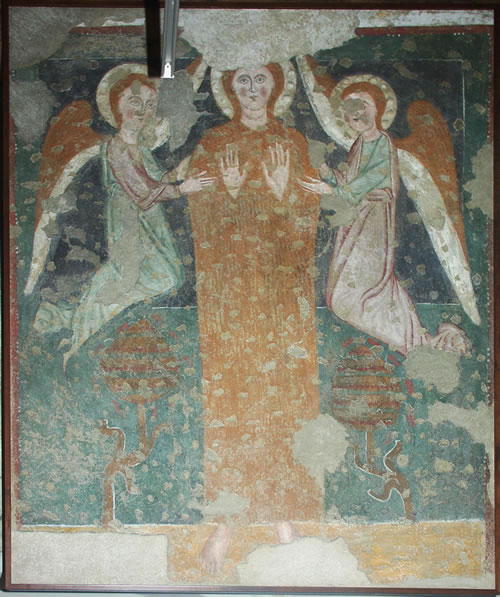
Madonna with angels

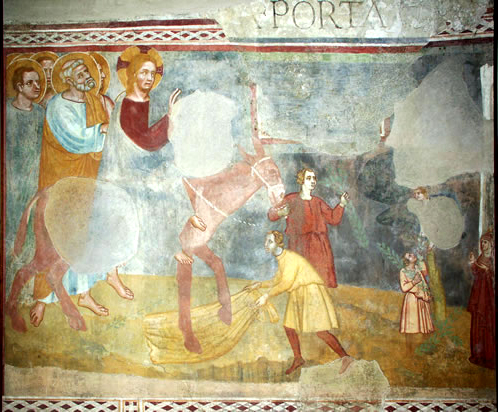
Entry into Jerusalem

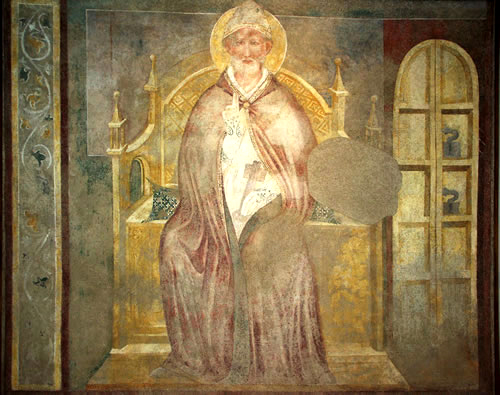
St. Peter

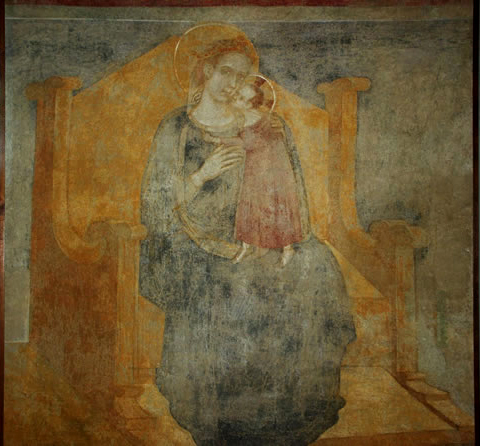
Madonna in Trono (Mary Enthroned) stained glass

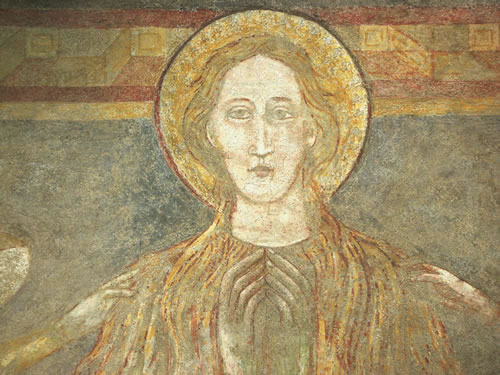
Maddalena

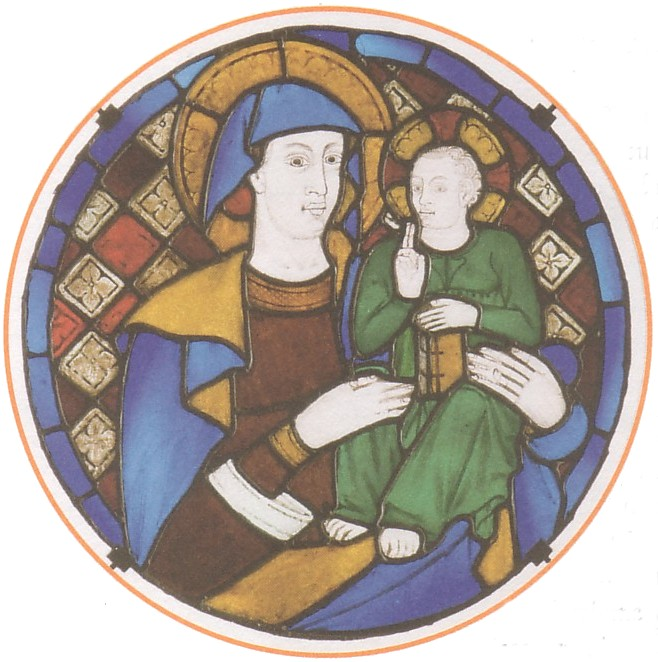
Virgin and Child stained glass at Matris Domini

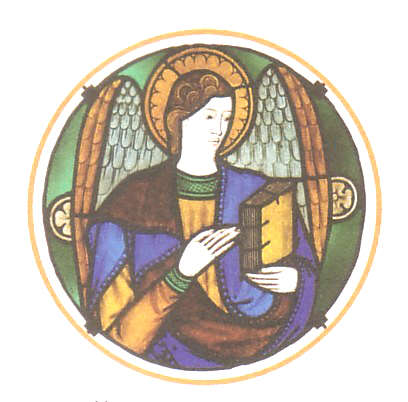
St. John the Evangelist glass at Matris Domini

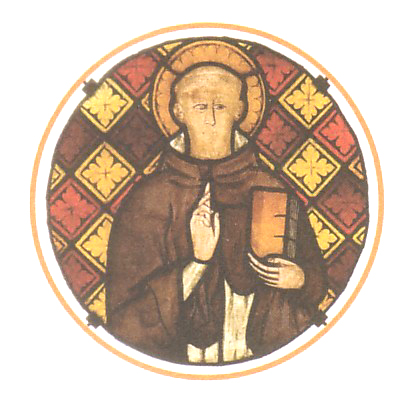
Stained Glass at Matris Domini

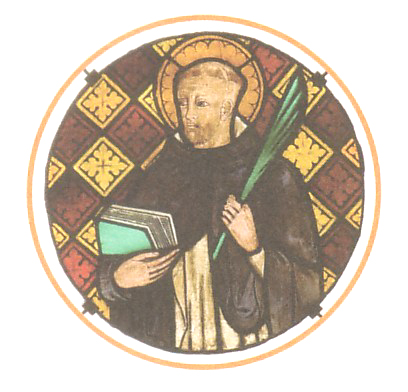
Saint (Peter of Verona?) stained glass at Matris Domini

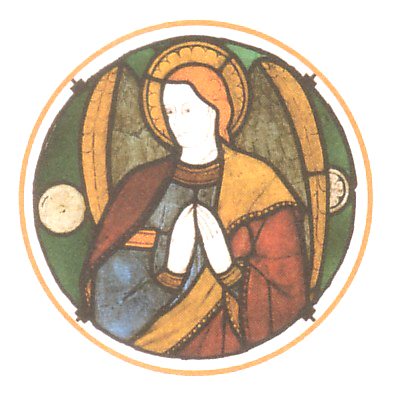
Angel stained glass window at Matris Domini
