= Michele Chiaruzzi =

Sammarinese diplomat and academic

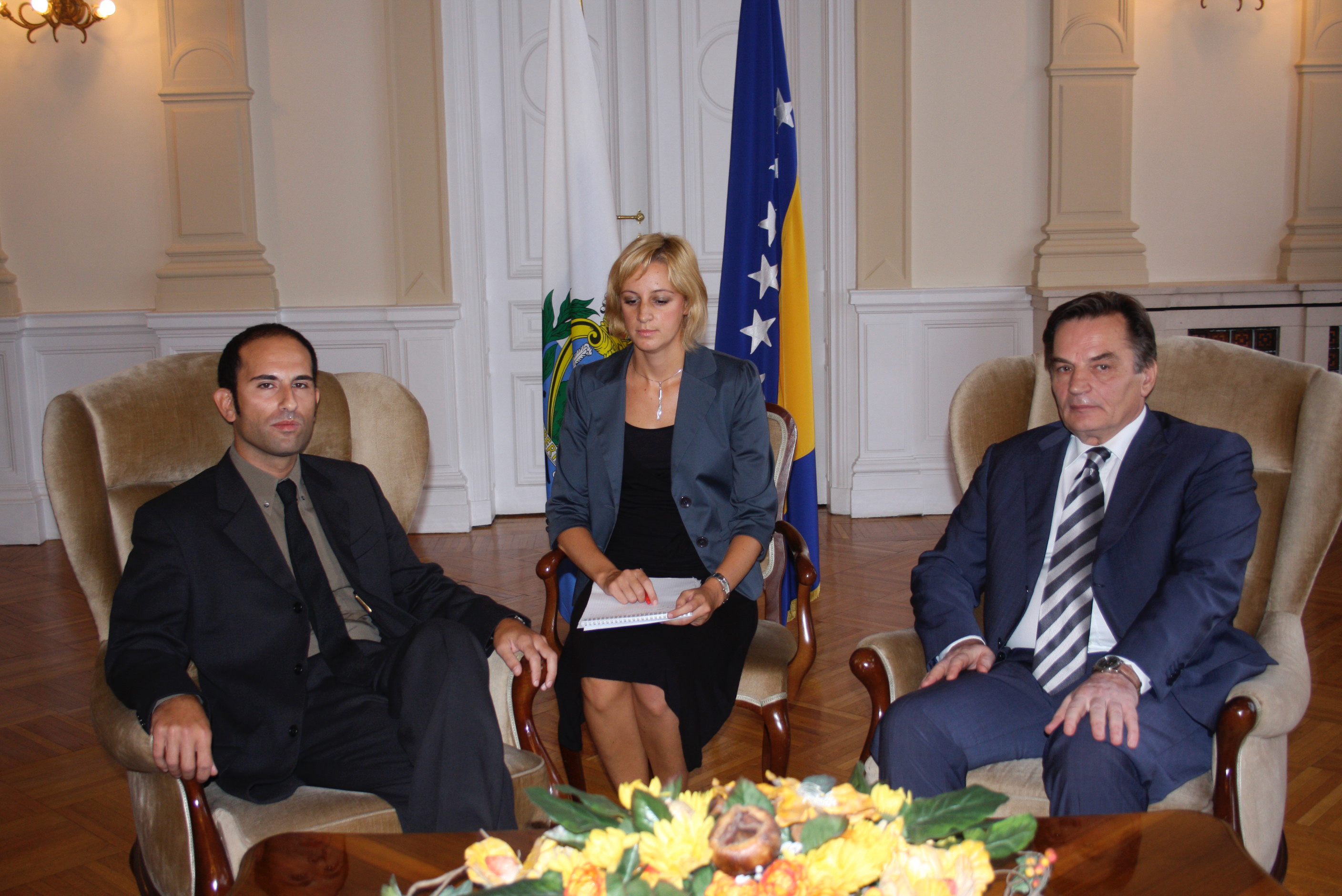
Ambassador Michele Chiaruzzi with Bosnia and Herzegovina's Presidency member Haris Silajdžić in 2008

Michele Chiaruzzi (born September 12, 1983, in San Marino) is a Sammarinese academic and diplomat, since 2008 ambassador of San Marino to Bosnia and Herzegovina.

== Biography ==
Chiaruzzi holds a Ph.D. in history from the Scuola Superiore di Studi Storici di San Marino. He has researched the British scholar Martin Wight, publishing in 2016 the book Martin Wight on Fortune and Irony in Politics.

A Clare Hall, Cambridge life member, and associate professor at the University of Bologna, he is the founding director of the Research Centre for International Relations at the University of San Marino. He has been described as one of the few people in San Marino who might qualify as a "public intellectual".

Appointed in 2008, Chiaruzzi became the first resident ambassador of San Marino to Bosnia and Herzegovina.

His diplomatic career has attracted international media attention, and he was featured in Goran Milić's Al Jazeera documentary Alkemija Balkana.

In July 2010, on his initiative, the municipality of Chiesanuova in San Marino placed a plaque commemorating the Srebrenica genocide, described as one of the first monuments in Europe dedicated to the genocide.

In 2019, Chiaruzzi created the sculpture Dialogue, which was inaugurated at the Chapel of Saint Anne and dedicated to interfaith dialogue.
