= Krzysztof Olendzki =

Polish diplomat

Krzysztof Olendzki Ph.D.
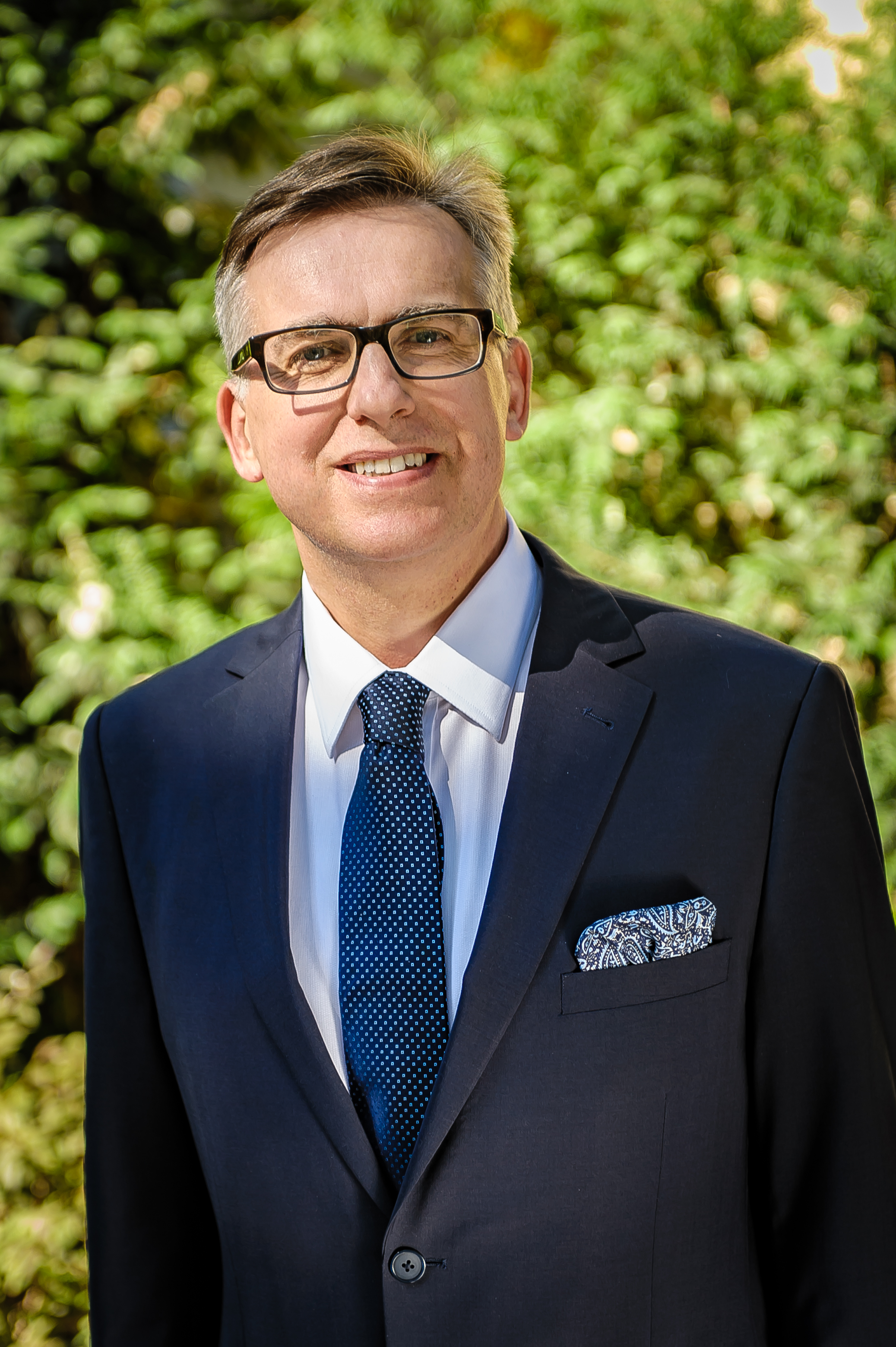

Poland Ambassador to Tunisia
- In office 2008–2012
- Preceded by: Zdzisław Raczyński
- Succeeded by: Iwo Byczewski

7th Poland Ambassador to Slovenia
- In office April 2020 – July 2024
- Preceded by: Paweł Czerwiński

Personal details
- Born: July 2, 1963 (age 63) Bystrzyca Kłodzka
- Spouse: Joanna Olendzka
- Children: 3 sons
- Education: University of Warsaw
- Profession: Diplomat, historian, politician
- Awards: Order of the Polonia Restitutia Order of the Republic (Tunisia)

Krzysztof Jan Olendzki (born 2 July 1963 in Bystrzyca Kłodzka) is a Polish diplomat; ambassador to Tunisia (2008–2012) and Slovenia (2020–2024).

== Life ==
Olendzki graduated from history at the University of Warsaw (1987). He has been studying also at the Institute of History of the Polish Academy of Sciences. In 1995, he defended his Ph.D. thesis at the Scuola Superiore di Studi Storici di San Marino.

From 1987 to 1988 and from 1997 to 1999 he was working for the Polish Scientific Publishers PWN, where he was editor of the English-language publication Poland. An Encyclopedic Guide. He has been also employed as research assistant at the University of Warsaw Achieves (1987–1988), and, since 1992, as assistant professor at the SGH Warsaw School of Economics, Department of Socio-Economic History. He was also deputy director of the European Studies Programme organized by SGH and Sciences-Po Paris (1996–1999; 2001–2003).

Between 1998 and 1999, Olendzki served as Minister-Counselor at the Department of Western Europe, Ministry of Foreign Affairs. Next, for two years he has been deputy director of the Polish Institute and First Secretary at the Embassy of Poland, Rome. From 2001 to 2004 he was Advisor to the Minister, First Secretary, and Counsellor at the MFA Department of Foreign Policy Strategy and Planning. Between 2004 and 2006, he was serving at the embassy in Tallinn, Estonia, being responsible for political relations. From December 2007 to September 2008 he was Deputy Director of the MFA Department of Public and Cultural Diplomacy.

From 12 January 2006 to 3 December 2007 Olendzki was serving as a Vice Minister of Culture, since 19 January 2007 being also Government Plenipotentiary for the EXPO 2012 in Wrocław. On 20 August 2008, he was appointed Poland Ambassador to Tunisia, ending his term on 31 January 2012. In the autumn of 2011, he was appointed Titular Ambassador. Between March 2012 and September 2014 he has been holding several directorial posts at the MFA. Later, from September 2014 to 2015 he has been Consul-General in Vancouver. Since September 2016, for next three years he was director of the Adam Mickiewicz Institute, being responsible for cultural diplomacy and the promotion of Polish culture abroad. In 2019, he returned to the MFA. In March 2020, he was nominated Poland ambassador to Slovenia, beginning his mission following month. He ended his term in July 2024.

Krzysztof Olendzki is married to Joanna Olendzka, with three sons: Jan, Antoni, Wiktor. Besides Polish, Olendzki speaks English, French, Italian and Russian.

== Honours ==
- Knight's Cross of the Order of Polonia Restituta (2012)
- Commander's Cross of the Order of the Republic of Tunisia
