= Delia Vaccarello =

Italian journalist and writer (1960–2019)

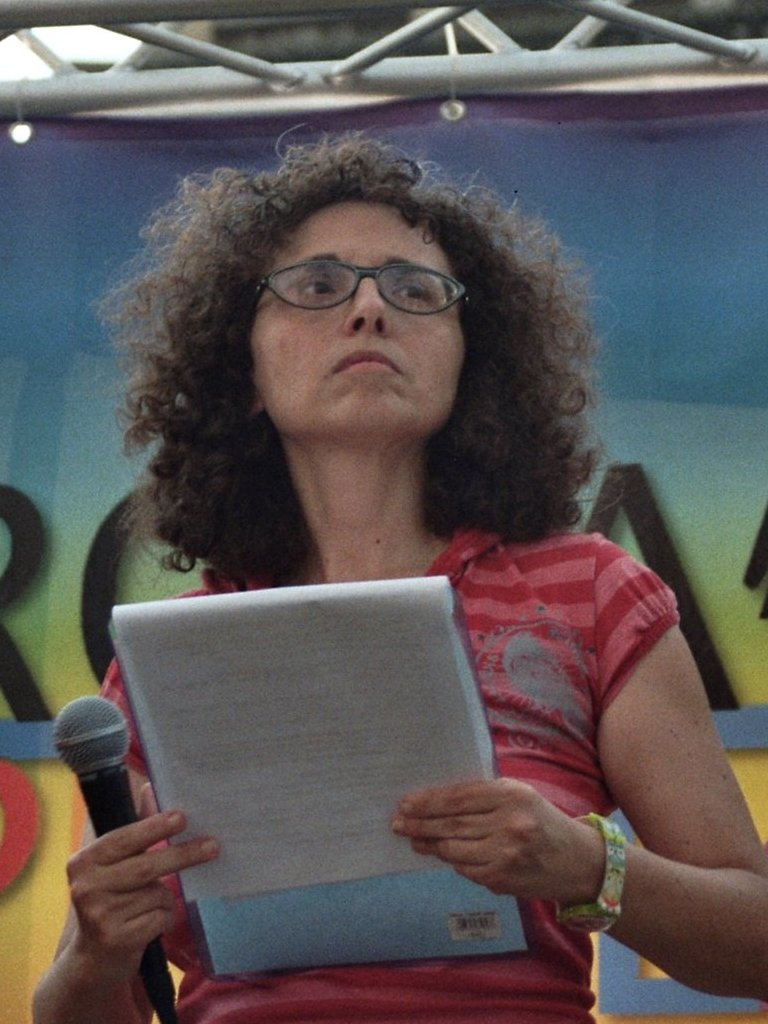
Delia Vaccarello, 2010

Delia Vaccarello (7 October 1960 - 27 September 2019) was an Italian journalist and writer, as well as an activist for LGBT rights. She conducted lectures regarding journalism in Bologna and Urbino, and edited columns in the national periodical press related to anti-discrimination issues. A self-declared lesbian, in 2005, she collaborated on a project in the municipality of Venice for citizen education regarding homophobia. For Arnoldo Mondadori Editore, she curated a multi-volume anthology on love between women, the Principesse azzurre ("Blue Princesses").

== Biography ==
Delia Vaccarello was born in Palermo, 7 October 1960. She graduated from Sapienza University of Rome with a degree in philosophy writing her thesis on cultural anthropology.

Since 1990, Vaccarello was associated with the newspaper L'Unità, first, as an employee and, later, as a freelancer. For L'Unità, she edited the page "Uno, due, tre… liberi tutti" ("One, two, three ... free everyone"). She also collaborated with the weekly Il Salvagente for which she edited the column "Il Salvagiovani". From 2010, she was affiliated with Il Fatto Quotidiano, and from May 2013, with the Huffington Post.

In addition to her writing, Vaccarello conducted seminars at the journalism schools in Bologna and Urbino, for which she developed an unpublished course of studies entitled "Media and Prejudices", the latter referring in particular to sexual orientation. From 29 August to 8 September 2007, she was a member of the jury of the first Queer Lion Award at the 64th Venice International Film Festival.

A cancer patient since 2013, Vaccarello died in Palermo on September 27, 2019.

== Selected works ==
=== Author ===
- Gli svergognati: vite di gay, lesbiche, trans… storie di tutti, Milan, La Tartaruga, 2003, ISBN 88-7738-369-0.
- L'amore secondo noi: ragazzi e ragazze alla ricerca dell'identità, Milan, Mondadori, 2005, ISBN 88-04-54404-X.
- Sciò!: giovani, bugie, identità, Milan, Mondadori, 2007, ISBN 88-04-56835-6.
- Quando si ama si deve partire, Milan, Mondadori, 2008, ISBN 88-04-57801-7.
- Evviva la neve, Milan, Mondadori, 2010, ISBN 88-04-60234-1.

=== Editor ===
- Delia Vaccarello; Mavì Zongoli, eds. (1991). Il bambino colorato. Incontro internazionale, Castiglioncello 21-22-23 aprile 1989. Comune di Rosignano Marittimo, Coordinamento Genitori Democratici. Napoli: Tecnodid.
- Delia Vaccarello; Mavì Zongoli, eds. (1991). Il bambino bruciato. Incontro internazionale. Castiglioncello, 11-12-13 maggio 1990, Comune di Rosignano Marittimo, Coordinamento Genitori Democratici. Firenze: La Nuova Italia. ISBN 88-221-0982-1.
- Delia Vaccarello, ed. (2003). Principesse azzurre: racconti d'amore e di vita di donne tra donne. Milano: Mondadori. ISBN 88-04-51654-2.
- Delia Vaccarello, ed. (2004). Principesse azzurre 2: racconti d'amore e di vita di donne tra donne. Milano: Mondadori. ISBN 88-04-52903-2.
- Delia Vaccarello, ed. (2005). Principesse azzurre 3: racconti d'amore e di vita di donne tra donne. Milano: Mondadori. ISBN 88-04-54728-6.
- Delia Vaccarello, ed. (2006). Principesse azzurre crescono: racconti d'amore e di vita di donne tra donne. Milano: Mondadori. ISBN 88-04-55575-0.
- Delia Vaccarello, ed. (2007). Principesse azzurre da guardare: racconti d'amore e di vita di donne tra donne. Milano: Mondadori. ISBN 978-88-04-56895-7.
- Delia Vaccarello, ed. (2008). Eros up, principesse azzurre in amore: racconti d'amore e di vita di donne tra donne. Milano: Mondadori. ISBN 978-88-04-57776-8.
- Delia Vaccarello, ed. (2009). Pressoché amanti: racconti d'amore e di vita di donne tra donne. Milano: Mondadori. ISBN 978-88-04-59262-4.
