= Eugenio Garin =

Italian philosopher and historian

Eugenio Garin (May 9, 1909 – December 29, 2004) was an Italian philosopher and Renaissance historian. He was recognised as an authority on the cultural history of the Renaissance. Born at Rieti, Garin studied philosophy at the University of Florence, graduating in 1929, and after a period as professor of philosophy at the liceo scientifico Stanislao Cannizzaro in Palermo and the University of Cagliari, Garin began teaching at his alma mater in 1949 until 1974, then moving to the Scuola Normale di Pisa until his retirement in 1984. The Graduate School of Historical Studies at San Marino was inaugurated with a public lecture by Eugenio Garin on 30 September 1989. Garin was an elected member of both the American Philosophical Society and the American Academy of Arts and Sciences. He also was the editor of the journals Rinascimento and Giornale Critico della Filosofia Italiana.

== Works ==
- Giovanni Pico della Mirandola (1937)
- Il Rinascimento italiano (1941)
- Storia della filosofia italiana (1947, 1966, 1978); English translation: History of Italian Philosophy. (Amsterdam/New York, 2008)
- L'Umanesimo italiano (1952); English translation: Italian humanism; philosophy and civic life in the Renaissance (New York, 1965)
- Medioevo e rinascimento (1954)
- Cronache di filosofia italiana (1900-1943) (1955)
- L'educazione in Europa 1400-1600 (1957)
- La filosofia come sapere storico (1959)
- La cultura italiana tra Ottocento e Novecento (1962)
- Scienza e vita civile nel Rinascimento italiano (1965); English translation: Science and civic life in the Italian renaissance (New York, 1969)
- Ritratti di umanisti (Firenze: Sansoni 1967)
- Dal Rinascimento all'Illuminismo, (1970)
- Intellettuali italiani del XX secolo, (1974)
- Rinascite e rivoluzioni (1975)
- Lo zodiaco della vita, (1976); English translation: Astrology in the Renaissance: the zodiac of life (London, 1983)
- Filosofia e scienze nel Novecento, (1978)
- Tra due secoli (1983)
- Ermetismo del Rinascimento (1988)
- Umanisti artisti scienziati. Studi sul Rinascimento italiano (1989)
- Gli editori italiani tra Ottocento e Novecento (1991)
