= Remo Bodei =

Italian philosopher (1938–2019)

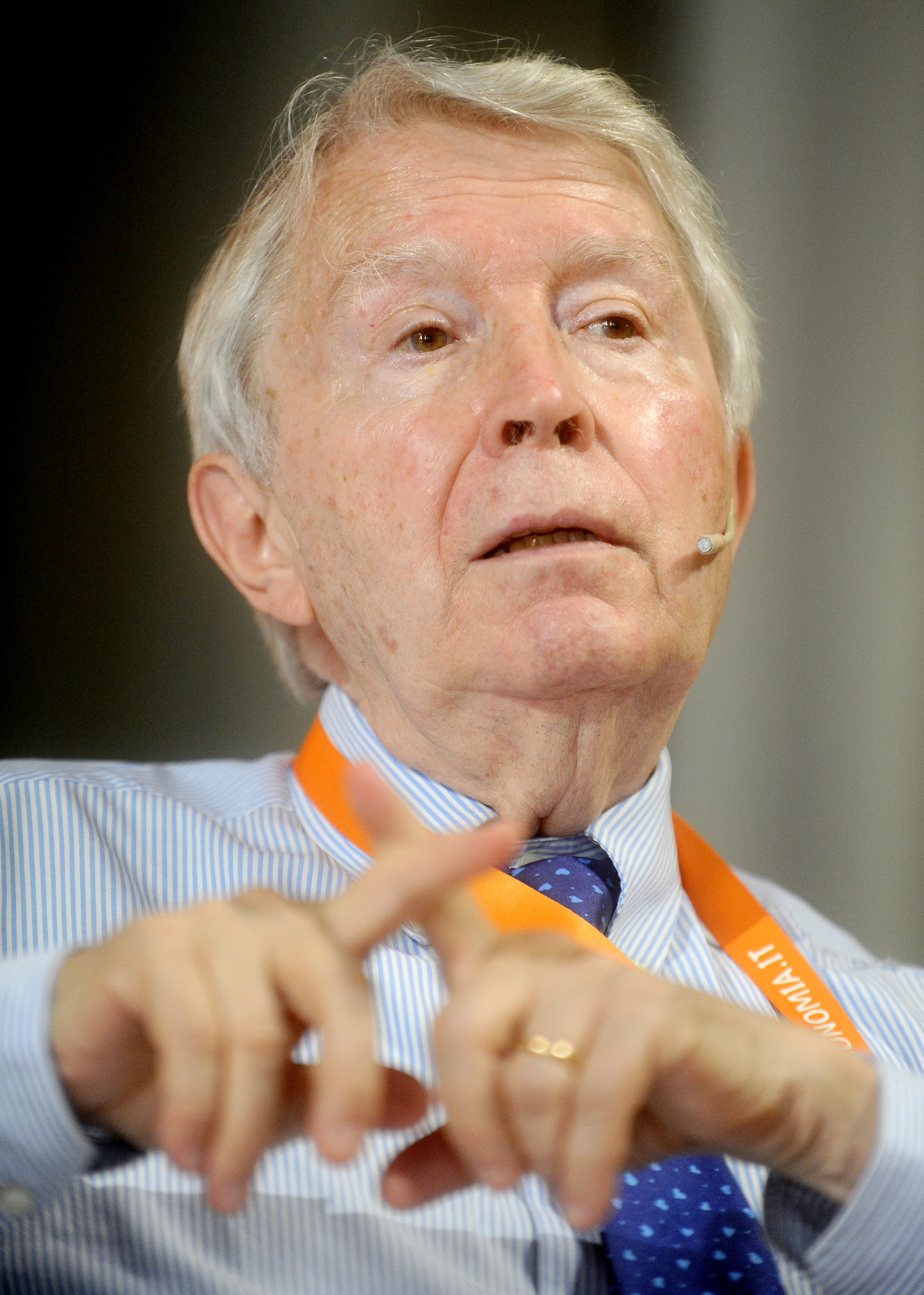
- Bodei in 2018
- Born: August 3, 1938; Cagliari, Italy
- Died: November 7, 2019 (aged 81); Pisa, Italy

Remo Bodei (3 August 1938 – 7 November 2019) was an Italian philosopher. He was a professor of the history of philosophy at University of California, Los Angeles, and also taught at the University of Pisa and Scuola Normale Superiore di Pisa. Bodei was born in Cagliari. His initial interests were in classical German philosophy, and the Weimar Classicism period (1770–1830). He subsequently penned over 200 papers on utopian thinkers of the eighteenth and nineteenth centuries, and contemporary political thought. He died in Pisa, aged 81.

Bodei was considered a philosopher, "among the leading experts in the philosophies of classical German idealism and the Romantic age".

== Works ==
His books include the following volumes:

- Sistema ed epoca in Hegel (Bologna, Il Mulino, 1975. Reprinted 2014 with the title La civetta e la talpa. Sistema ed epoca in Hegel)
- Hegel e Weber. Egemonia e legittimazione (Bari, De Donato, 1977) (with Franco Cassano)
- Multiversum. Tempo e storia in Ernst Bloch (Napoli, Bibliopolis, 1979), 1983 (new edition)
- Scomposizioni. Forme dell'individuo moderno (Turin, Einaudi, 1987. Reprinted by Il Mulino, Bologna, 2016)
- Hölderlin: la filosofia y lo tragico (Madrid, Visor, 1990)
- Ordo amoris. Conflitti terreni e felicità celeste (Bologna, Il Mulino, 1991)
- Geometria delle passioni. Paura, speranza e felicità: filosofia e uso politico (Milano, Feltrinelli, 1991)
- Le forme del bello (Bologna, Il Mulino, 1995)
- Le prix de la liberté (Paris, Éditions du Cerf, 1995)
- Se la storia ha un senso (Bergamo, Moretti & Vitali, 1997)
- La filosofia nel Novecento (Roma, Donzelli, 1997)
- Se la storia ha un senso, Bergamo, Moretti & Vitali, 1997.
- La politica e la felicità (with Luigi Franco Pizzolato), Roma, Edizioni Lavoro, 1997.
- Il noi diviso. Ethos e idee dell'Italia repubblicana, Torino, Einaudi, 1998.
- Le logiche del delirio. Ragione, affetti, follia, Roma-Bari, Laterza, 2000.
- I senza Dio. Figure e momenti dell'ateismo, Brescia, Morcelliana, 2001.
- Il dottor Freud e i nervi dell'anima. Filosofia e società a un secolo dalla nascita della psicoanalisi, Roma, Donzelli, 2001.
- Destini personali. L'età della colonizzazione delle coscienze, Milano, Feltrinelli (publisher), 2002.
- Delirio e conoscenza, Remo Bodei, in "Il vaso di Pandora" (Magazine), Dialoghi in psichiatria e scienze umane, Vol. X, N. 3, 2002.
- Una scintilla di fuoco. Invito alla filosofia, Bologna, Zanichelli, 2005.
- Piramidi di tempo. Storie e teoria del déjà vu, Bologna, Il Mulino, 2006.
- Paesaggi sublimi. Gli uomini davanti alla natura selvaggia, Milano, Bompiani, 2008.
- Il sapere della follia, Modena, Fondazione Collegio San Carlo per Festival Filosofia, 2008.
- Il dire la verità nella genealogia del soggetto occidentale in A.A. V.V., Foucault oggi, Milano, Feltrinelli (publisher), 2008.
- La vita delle cose, Roma-Bari, Laterza, 2009.
- Ira. La passione furente, Bologna, Il Mulino, 2011.
- Beati i miti, perché avranno in eredità la terra (with Sergio Givone), Torino, Lindau, 2013.
- Immaginare altre vite. Realtà, progetti, desideri, Milano, Feltrinelli (publisher), 2013.
- Limite, Bologna, Il Mulino, 2016.
- Le virtù Cardinali (with Giulio Giorello, Michela Marzano and Salvatore Veca), Roma-Bari, Laterza, 2017.
- Dominio e sottomissione. Schiavi, animali, macchine, Intelligenza Artificiale, Bologna, Il Mulino, 2019.
