= List of adjectival and demonymic forms for countries and nations =

The following is a list of adjectival and demonymic forms of countries and nations in English. A country adjective describes something as being associated with that country; for example, "Italian restaurant" is an adjectival phrase meaning "restaurant in Italy" or "restaurant offering dishes associated with the cuisine of Italy". A country demonym denotes the people or the inhabitants of or from there; for example, "Germans" are people of or from Germany.

Demonyms are given in plural forms. Singular forms simply remove the final s or, in the case of -ese endings, are the same as the plural forms. With the exception of "Turkmen" (the demonym for Turkmenistan), the ending -men has the feminine equivalent -women (e.g., Irishmen, Scotswomen). The French terminations -ois and -ais serve as both the singular and plural masculine; feminine equivalents are -oise and -aise for singular, and -oises and -aises plural. The Spanish and Portuguese termination -o usually denotes the masculine and is normally changed to feminine by dropping the -o and adding -a. The plural forms are usually -os and -as, respectively.

Adjectives ending in -ish can be used as collective demonyms (e.g., "the English", "the Spanish"). So can those ending in -ch or -tch (e.g., "the French", "the Dutch"), provided they are pronounced with a 'ch' sound (e.g., the adjective Czech does not qualify).

Many place-name adjectives and demonyms are also used for other nouns, sometimes with one or more additional words. Notable examples are cuisines, cheeses, cat breeds, dog breeds, and horse breeds. (See List of words derived from toponyms.)

In cases where two or more adjectival forms are given, there is often a subtle difference in usage between the two. This is particularly the case with Central Asian countries, where one form tends to relate to the nation and the other tends to relate to the predominant ethnic group (e.g., Uzbek is primarily an ethnicity, Uzbekistani relates to citizens of Uzbekistan).

== List ==
Country/entity name	Adjectivals	Demonyms
Abkhazia	Abkhaz; Abkhazian	Abkhazians
Afghanistan	Afghan	Afghans
Åland	Åland Island	Ålanders
Albania	Albanian	Albanians
Algeria	Algerian	Algerians
American Samoa	American Samoan	American Samoans
Andorra	Andorran	Andorrans
Angola	Angolan	Angolans
Anguilla	Anguillan	Anguillans
Antarctica (Note: Antarctica is the southernmost continent and not a country. The Antarctic Treaty System governs Antarctica, the Southern Ocean, and all territory south of the 60th parallel south.)	Antarctic	Antarctic residents, Antarcticans
Antigua and Barbuda	Antiguan; Barbudan	Antiguans; Barbudans
Argentina	Argentine; Argentinian	Argentines; Argentinians
Armenia	Armenian	Armenians
Aruba	Aruban	Arubans
Australia	Australian	Australians
Austria	Austrian	Austrians
Azerbaijan	Azerbaijani; Azeri	Azerbaijanis; Azeris
The Bahamas	Bahamian	Bahamians
Bahrain	Bahraini	Bahrainis
Bangladesh	Bangladeshi	Bangladeshis
Barbados	Barbadian	Barbadians; Bajans
Belarus	Belarusian	Belarusians
Belgium	Belgian	Belgians
Belize	Belizean	Belizeans
Benin	Beninese; Beninois	Beninese; Beninois
Bermuda	Bermudian; Bermudan	Bermudians; Bermudans
Bhutan	Bhutanese	Bhutanese
Bolivia	Bolivian	Bolivians
Bonaire	Bonaire; Bonairean	Bonaireans
Bosnia and Herzegovina	Bosnian; Herzegovinian	Bosnians; Herzegovinians
Botswana	Botswanan	Batswana (singular Motswana)
Bouvet Island	Bouvet Island	Bouvet Islanders
Brazil	Brazilian	Brazilians
British Indian Ocean Territory	BIOT	British
Brunei	Bruneian	Bruneians
Bulgaria	Bulgarian	Bulgarians
Burkina Faso	Burkinabe	Burkinabes
Burundi	Burundian	Burundians; Barundi
Cabo Verde (Note: The Republic of Cabo Verde was formerly known as Cape Verde.)	Cabo Verdean	Cabo Verdeans
Cambodia	Cambodian	Cambodians
Cameroon	Cameroonian	Cameroonians
Canada	Canadian	Canadians
Cayman Islands	Caymanian	Caymanians
Central African Republic	Central African	Central Africans
Chad	Chadian	Chadians
Chile	Chilean	Chileans
China	Chinese	Chinese
Christmas Island	Christmas Island	Christmas Islanders
Cocos (Keeling) Islands	Cocos Island	Cocos Islanders
Colombia	Colombian	Colombians
Comoros	Comoran; Comorian	Comorans; Comorians
Democratic Republic of the Congo	Congolese	Congolese
Republic of the Congo	Congolese	Congolese
Cook Islands	Cook Island	Cook Islanders
Costa Rica	Costa Rican	Costa Ricans
Croatia	Croatian	Croatians; Croats
Cuba	Cuban	Cubans
Curaçao	Curaçaoan	Curaçaoans
Cyprus	Cypriot	Cypriots
Czech Republic	Czech	Czechs
Denmark	Danish	Danes
Djibouti	Djiboutian	Djiboutians
Dominica	Dominican (Note: The third syllable of Dominican (from Dominica) is stressed.)	Dominicans
Dominican Republic	Dominican (Note: The second syllable of Dominican (from the Dominican Republic) is stressed.)	Dominicans
Ecuador	Ecuadorian	Ecuadorians
Egypt	Egyptian	Egyptians
El Salvador	Salvadoran	Salvadorans; Salvadorians; Salvadoreans
England	English	English; Englishmen and Englishwomen
Equatorial Guinea	Equatorial Guinean; Equatoguinean	Equatorial Guineans; Equatoguineans
Eritrea	Eritrean	Eritreans
Estonia	Estonian	Estonians
Eswatini (Note: Eswatini was formerly known as Swaziland.)	Swazi; Swati	Swazis
Ethiopia	Ethiopian	Ethiopians; Habesha
European Union (Note: The European Union is a politico-economic union of sovereign states.)	European (Note: The demonym European may be used to designate either a citizen of a member state of the European Union or a resident of the greater European continent.)	Europeans
Falkland Islands	Falkland Island	Falkland Islanders
Faroe Islands	Faroese	Faroese
Fiji	Fijian	Fijians
Finland	Finnish	Finns
France	French	French; Frenchmen and Frenchwomen
French Guiana	French Guianese	French Guianese
French Polynesia	French Polynesian	French Polynesians
French Southern Territories	French Southern Territories	French
Gabon	Gabonese	Gabonese; Gabonaise
The Gambia	Gambian	Gambians
Georgia	Georgian	Georgians
Germany	German	Germans
Ghana	Ghanaian	Ghanaians
Gibraltar	Gibraltar	Gibraltarians
Greece	Greek; Hellenic	Greeks; Hellenes
Greenland	Greenlandic	Greenlanders
Grenada	Grenadian	Grenadians
Guadeloupe	Guadeloupe	Guadeloupians; Guadeloupeans
Guam	Guamanian	Guamanians
Guatemala	Guatemalan	Guatemalans
Guernsey	Guernsey	Guernseymen and Guernseywomen
Guinea	Guinean	Guineans
Guinea-Bissau	Bissau-Guinean	Bissau-Guineans
Guyana	Guyanese	Guyanese
Haiti	Haitian	Haitians
Heard Island and McDonald Islands	Heard Island; McDonald Island	Heard Islanders; McDonald Islanders
Honduras	Honduran	Hondurans
Hong Kong	Hong Kong; Hong Konger	Hongkongers; Hong Kongese
Hungary	Hungarian; Magyar	Hungarians; Magyars
Iceland	Icelandic	Icelanders
India	Indian	Indians
Indonesia	Indonesian	Indonesians
Iran	Iranian	Iranians
Iraq	Iraqi	Iraqis
Ireland (Note: There is no adjective or demonym that distinguishes the Republic of Ireland from the entire island of Ireland. When distinction from Northern Ireland is necessary, the colloquial Southern Irish or Southerner is sometimes used; some people may find this offensive, and others may find it equally offensive in not distinguishing the Republic of Ireland from the island. As an alternative, an adjectival phrase may be used—for instance, "a law of the Republic of Ireland"—or, as a last resort, the name "Republic of Ireland" may be used as if it were an adjective (as in "a Republic of Ireland law").)	Irish	Irish; Irishmen and Irishwomen
Isle of Man	Manx	Manx; Manxmen and Manxwomen
Israel	Israeli	Israelis
Italy	Italian	Italians
Ivory Coast (Note: The Ivory Coast is now officially known as the Republic of Côte d'Ivoire.)	Ivorian	Ivorians
Jamaica	Jamaican	Jamaicans
Jan Mayen	Jan Mayen	Jan Mayen residents
Japan	Japanese	Japanese
Jersey	Jersey	Jerseymen and Jerseywomen; Jersian; Jèrriais
Jordan	Jordanian	Jordanians
Kazakhstan	Kazakhstani; Kazakh	Kazakhstanis; Kazakhs
Kenya	Kenyan	Kenyans
Kiribati	Kiribati	I-Kiribati
North Korea	North Korean	Koreans; North Koreans
South Korea	South Korean	Koreans; South Koreans
Kosovo	Kosovar; Kosovan	Kosovars, Kosovans
Kuwait	Kuwaiti	Kuwaitis
Kyrgyzstan	Kyrgyzstani; Kyrgyz; Kirgiz; Kirghiz	Kyrgyzstanis; Kyrgyz; Kirgiz; Kirghiz
Laos	Lao; Laotian	Laos; Laotians
Latvia	Latvian; Lettish	Latvians; Letts
Lebanon	Lebanese	Lebanese
Lesotho	Basotho	Basotho (singular Mosotho)
Liberia	Liberian	Liberians
Libya	Libyan	Libyans
Liechtenstein	Liechtensteiner	Liechtensteiners
Lithuania	Lithuanian	Lithuanians
Luxembourg	Luxembourg; Luxembourgish	Luxembourgers
Macau	Macanese	Macanese
Madagascar	Malagasy, Madagascan	Malagasy, Madagascans
Malawi	Malawian	Malawians
Malaysia	Malaysian	Malaysians
Maldives	Maldivian	Maldivians
Mali	Malian; Malinese	Malians
Malta	Maltese	Maltese
Marshall Islands	Marshallese	Marshallese
Martinique	Martiniquais; Martinican	Martiniquais; Martiniquaises
Mauritania	Mauritanian	Mauritanians
Mauritius	Mauritian	Mauritians
Mayotte	Mahoran	Mahorans
Mexico	Mexican	Mexicans
Micronesia	Micronesian	Micronesians
Moldova	Moldovan	Moldovans
Monaco	Monégasque; Monacan	Monégasques; Monacans
Mongolia	Mongolian	Mongolians; Mongols
Montenegro	Montenegrin	Montenegrins
Montserrat	Montserratian	Montserratians
Morocco	Moroccan	Moroccans
Mozambique	Mozambican	Mozambicans
Myanmar (Note: The official name of Myanmar is the Republic of the Union of Myanmar, although the nation is still sometimes referred to as Burma.)	Myanma; Burmese	Myanmar
Namibia	Namibian	Namibians
Nauru	Nauruan	Nauruans, dei-Naoero
Nepal	Nepali; Nepalese	Nepalis; Nepalese
Netherlands	Dutch	Dutch; Dutchmen and Dutchwomen; Netherlanders
New Caledonia	New Caledonian	New Caledonians
New Zealand	New Zealand	New Zealanders
Nicaragua	Nicaraguan	Nicaraguans
Niger	Nigerien	Nigeriens
Nigeria	Nigerian	Nigerians
Niue	Niuean	Niueans
Norfolk Island	Norfolk Island	Norfolk Islanders
North Macedonia	Macedonian	Macedonians
Northern Cyprus	Northern Cypriot, Turkish Cypriot	Northern Cypriots, Turkish Cypriots, Cypriot Turks
Northern Ireland	Northern Irish	Northern Irish; Northern Irishmen and Northern Irishwomen
Northern Mariana Islands	Northern Marianan	Northern Marianans
Norway	Norwegian	Norwegians
Oman	Omani	Omanis
Pakistan	Pakistani	Pakistanis
Palau	Palauan	Palauans
Palestine	Palestinian	Palestinians
Panama	Panamanian	Panamanians
Papua New Guinea	Papua New Guinean; Papuan	Papua New Guineans; Papuans
Paraguay	Paraguayan	Paraguayans
Peru	Peruvian	Peruvians
Philippines	Filipino; Philippine	Filipinos; Filipinas
Pitcairn Islands	Pitcairn Island	Pitcairn Islanders
Poland	Polish	Poles
Portugal	Portuguese	Portuguese
Puerto Rico	Puerto Rican	Puerto Ricans
Qatar	Qatari	Qataris
Réunion	Réunionese; Réunionnais	Réunionese; Réunionnais and Réunionnaises
Romania	Romanian	Romanians
Russia (Note: The official name of Russia is the Russian Federation.)	Russian	Russians
Rwanda	Rwandan	Rwandans; Banyarwanda
Saba	Saban	Sabans
Saint Barthélemy	Barthélemois	Barthélemois; Barthélemoises
Saint Helena, Ascension and Tristan da Cunha	Saint Helenian; Ascension Island; Tristanian	Saint Helenians; Ascension Islanders; Ascensionians; Tristanians
Saint Kitts and Nevis	Kittitian; Nevisian	Kittitians; Nevisians
Saint Lucia	Saint Lucian	Saint Lucians
Saint Martin	Saint-Martinoise	Saint-Martinois; Saint-Martinoises
Saint Pierre and Miquelon	Saint-Pierrais; Miquelonnais	Saint-Pierrais; Saint-Pierraises; Miquelonnais; Miquelonnaises; Saint Pierre and Miquelon Islanders
Saint Vincent and the Grenadines	Saint Vincentian; Vincentian	Saint Vincentians; Vincentians
Samoa	Samoan	Samoans
San Marino	San Marinese; Sammarinese	Sammarinese
São Tomé and Príncipe	São Toméan	São Toméans
Saudi Arabia	Saudi; Saudi Arabian	Saudis; Saudi Arabians
Scotland	Scottish	Scots; Scotsmen and Scotswomen
Senegal	Senegalese	Senegalese
Serbia	Serbian	Serbs; Serbians
Seychelles	Seychellois	Seychellois/Seychelloises
Sierra Leone	Sierra Leonean	Sierra Leoneans
Singapore	Singapore; Singaporean	Singaporeans
Sint Eustatius	Sint Eustatius; Statian	Statians
Sint Maarten	Sint Maarten	Sint Maarteners
Slovakia	Slovak	Slovaks; Slovakians
Slovenia	Slovenian; Slovene	Slovenes; Slovenians
Solomon Islands	Solomon Islands; Solomon Islander	Solomon Islanders
Somalia	Somali	Somalis
Somaliland	Somalilander	Somalilanders
South Africa	South African	South Africans
South Georgia and the South Sandwich Islands	South Georgia Island; South Sandwich Island	South Georgia Islanders; South Sandwich Islanders
South Ossetia	South Ossetian	South Ossetians
South Sudan	South Sudanese	South Sudanese
Spain	Spanish	Spaniards
Sri Lanka	Sri Lankan	Sri Lankans
Sudan	Sudanese	Sudanese
Suriname	Surinamese	Surinamers
Svalbard	Svalbard	Svalbardians, Svalbard residents
Sweden	Swedish	Swedes
Switzerland	Swiss	Swiss
Syria	Syrian	Syrians
Taiwan (Note: This entity is formally known as Republic of China (ROC), which ruled Mainland China from 1912 to 1949 and Taiwan since 1945, was previously a member of the United Nations (UN) until 1971. Many countries do not recognize the legitimacy of the ROC and instead recognize the People's Republic of China (PRC) as sole legitimate government of "China". Taiwan, Penghu and the ROC-controlled territories are also claimed by the PRC as its 23rd province. See also One China and Political status of Taiwan for various viewpoints.)	Taiwanese; Formosan	Taiwanese; Formosans
Tajikistan	Tajikistani	Tajikistanis; Tajiks
Tanzania	Tanzanian	Tanzanians
Thailand	Thai	Thai
Timor-Leste (Note: The Democratic Republic of Timor-Leste was formerly known as East Timor.)	Timorese	Timorese
Togo	Togolese	Togolese
Tokelau	Tokelauan	Tokelauans
Tonga	Tongan	Tongans
Transnistria (Note: The official name of the breakaway state of Transnistria is the Pridnestrovian Moldavian Republic, with Pridnestrovie as the official short version of the name. In English, the name "Transnistria" is still the most commonly used form. The Supreme Council passed a law on 5 September 2024 which banned the use of the term “Transnistria” within the region, imposing a fine of 360 rubles or up to 15 days imprisonment for using the name in public. The Republic of Moldova refers to the region as the Administrative-Territorial Units of the Left Bank of the Dniester. See also Names of Transnistria for more versions of the name within use and the etymologies behind them.)	Transnistrian, Pridnestrovian	Transnistrians, Pridnestrovians
Trinidad and Tobago	Trinidadian; Tobagonian	Trinidadians; Tobagonians
Tunisia	Tunisian	Tunisians
Turkey	Turkish	Turks
Turkmenistan	Turkmen	Turkmens
Turks and Caicos Islands	Turks and Caicos Island	Turks and Caicos Islanders
Tuvalu	Tuvaluan	Tuvaluans
Uganda	Ugandan	Ugandans
Ukraine	Ukrainian	Ukrainians
United Arab Emirates	Emirati; Emirian; Emiri	Emiratis; Emirians; Emiri
United Kingdom	British; United Kingdom; UK	Britons; British people
United States of America	American (Note: Citizens of the United States of America are known as Americans, although any resident of the Americas may share this demonym. Many other names for United States citizens have been proposed to avoid confusion.); United States; U.S.	Americans
Uruguay	Uruguayan	Uruguayans
Uzbekistan	Uzbekistani; Uzbek	Uzbekistanis; Uzbeks
Vanuatu	Ni-Vanuatu; Vanuatuan	Ni-Vanuatu
Vatican City	Vaticanian	Vaticanians
Venezuela	Venezuelan	Venezuelans
Vietnam	Vietnamese	Vietnamese
British Virgin Islands	British Virgin Island	British Virgin Islanders
United States Virgin Islands	U.S. Virgin Island	U.S. Virgin Islanders
Wales	Welsh	Welsh, Welshmen and Welshwomen
Wallis and Futuna	Wallis and Futuna; Wallisian; Futunan	Wallis and Futuna Islanders; Wallisians; Futunans
Western Sahara	Sahrawi; Saharawi; Western Saharan	Sahrawis; Saharawis; Western Saharans
Yemen	Yemeni	Yemenis
Zambia	Zambian	Zambians
Zimbabwe	Zimbabwean	Zimbabweans

== See also ==
- Demonym
  - List of adjectival and demonymic forms of place names
    - List of adjectivals and demonyms for astronomical bodies
    - List of adjectivals and demonyms for continental regions
      - List of adjectivals and demonyms for subcontinental regions
    - List of adjectival and demonymic forms for countries and nations
      - List of adjectivals and demonyms for Australia
      - List of adjectivals and demonyms for Canada
      - List of adjectivals and demonyms for Cuba
      - List of adjectivals and demonyms for India
      - List of adjectivals and demonyms for Malaysia
      - List of adjectivals and demonyms for Mexico
      - List of adjectivals and demonyms for New Zealand
      - List of adjectivals and demonyms for the Philippines
      - List of demonyms for the United Kingdom
      - List of adjectivals and demonyms for the United States
    - List of adjectivals and demonyms for cities
    - List of adjectivals and demonyms for former regions
      - List of adjectivals and demonyms for Greco-Roman antiquity
    - List of adjectivals and demonyms for fictional regions
