= Sammarinese dialect =

Dialect from San Marino

Sammarinese
- San Marino
- Native to: San Marino
- Ethnicity: Sammarinese
- Native speakers: 27,730
- Language family: Indo-European: Italic; Latino-Faliscan; Latinic; Romance; Italo-Western; Western Romance; Gallo-Iberian?; Gallo-Romance; Gallo-Italic; Emilian–Romagnol; Romagnol; Sammarinese
- Dialects: North-Eastern (Serravallian); South-Western; South-Eastern
- Writing system: Latin

Official status
- Official language in: San Marino

Language codes
- ISO 639-3: –
- Glottolog: samm1243
- Linguasphere: 51-AAA-okk

The Sammarinese dialect is a dialect of Romagnol spoken in the Republic of San Marino by 83% of the inhabitants. It is considered an intermediate dialect between that of Rimini, Valmarecchia and Urbino. The dialect spoken in Serravalle is distinguished by its closeness to the Rimini dialect. Its state of conservation is critical, to the point that it is hypothesized that it will disappear by 2040.

== Literature ==
There is no official spelling or standardization yet.

The main writers in the Sammarinese dialect were Pietro Rossi in the nineteenth century and Nino Lombardi, Marino Rossi and Giuseppe Macina.

Nowadays Francesco Guidi, known as "Checco", is a prolific author of poems and editor of collections of popular sayings, specializing in the Serravalle variant.

In 2021 the first "Dictionary of Sammarinese dialect" published by Ente Cassa di Faetano was presented.

== Toponyms ==
The following toponyms are reported from the "Dizionario dialetto sammarinese" (2021). Where necessary, the castles of Città (C), Faetano (F) and Serravalle (S) are indicated, chosen as a sample of the central, southern and northern varieties respectively.

=== Castles ===
- Acquaviva: Acquaviva
- Borgo Maggiore: Bórg (CF), Bòurg (S)
- Chiesanuova: Cisanòva
- City of San Marino: San Marèin (CF), San Maroin (S)
- Domagnano: Dmagnén
- Faetano: Faitèn
- Fiorentino: Fiurentéin (CF), Fiurantóin (S)
- Montegiardino: Mungiardêin (CF), Mungiardóin (S)
- Serravalle: Seravàl

=== Curazie ===
- Cà Rigo: Cà Rig
- Corianino: Curianéin (CF), Curianóin (S)
- Dogana: Dughéna
- Falciano: Falcén
- Fiorina: Fiurìna (C), Fiuréina (F), Fiuróina (S)
- Gualdicciolo: Gualdiciùl (C), Gualdiciùl (FS)
- Monte Pulito: Mònt Pulìd (C), Mùnt Pulìd (F), Mòunt Pulìd (S)
- Murata: Murèda
- Ventoso: Ventós (C), Vintós (F), Ventòus (S)

== Phrases ==
- I went to get a pair of shoes at Dogana: so andeda a to un per ad scherpi ma la Dughena / a so andè a tò un pera ad scherpi ma la Dughena
- what do you do?: cus chet fè? / cust fè? / cus èll che t'fè?
- come here: vin a che / vin i che
- I'll see you later: ac videm più tèrd / a s videm pio terd
- don't do that: nu fa csé / nu fa i sé
- I'm going to sleep: a vag a durmì
- I live in San Marino: a stag a San Maroin
- you don't know how to do anything: tu n si bun da fè gnint / tun sè fè gnint
- you can't always do as you please: tu n pù fe sempri cum cut per ma té / t'u n pò fè sempri cum ch'u t pèr ma te
- I can: i a pòs / ji a poss
- look carefully: guèrda bèin / guerda ben
- you don't understand: tu n capés / tu n capéss

=== April Day ===
(Romagnol)

- Sa l'eria tevda ch'porta inscìm l'avril us ved al pavaiòli a svulazé che in gir ti chemp al va cumé a purté l'augùrie più gradid e più gentil.

(Italian)

- Con l'aria tiepida che porta insieme l'aprile si vedono le farfalle svolazzare che in giro nei campi vanno come a portare l'augurio più gradito e più gentile.

(English)

- With the warm air that April brings, you can see butterflies fluttering around the fields as if to bring the most welcome and kindest greeting.

(Nino Lombardi, GIURNÈDA D'AVRIL - GIORNATA D'APRILE)

=== Una nuvela del Bucasc ===
Donca a degh che a' temp d'e prim re 'd Cipre, dop fat la conquesta dla Tera Sänta da Gotifred 'd Buglion, è success ch'una gentildona 'd Guascogna l'andò a m'e Sepolcre in pelegrinagg, e a t'e turnä, ariväda ch'la fu a Cipre, la fu vilanament ultragiäda da di omne sceleräd. Lia, dulendsne 'd 'sta cosa, disperäda, la pensò d'andä a ricora da 'e re; ma u 'j fu det da qualch d'un ch'la perdria la fadiga, perché lù l'era d'una vita acsè sgraziäda, e tänt da poch, che non sol u 'n puniva con giustizia gl'ingiuri fati am i ältr, ma änzie e sustneva da vigliach tuta cla gran massa ch'i 'j ne feva m'a lù: tänt che chiunque l'avess avud con lù dla stezza, u 's sfugäva con fäj del bujarii e del birichinädi. La dona, sentend 'sta cosa, disperand d'otnè vendeta, per consuläss un poch de su disgust, la 's mis in testa 'd vlè stuzzigä la cujonagin 'd ché re; e, andäda da lù piangend, la 'j dess: "'E mi signor, i an vengh da té per dmandä vendeta dl'ingiuria ch'm'è städ fata ma, per mi sodisfazion, at pregh che 't m'insegna com t'fè a sufrì tut cl'ingiuri ch'a so ch'u 't ven fat, perché i a possa da té imparä a supurtä la mia con pazienza, e u 'l sa 'e Signor se i al psess fä, che volontier at la regalaria, perché a vegh t'hè 'e cor bon da suportäli" 'E re, städ fin da ché mument gnurgnon e pigre, com ch'u 's fuss proprie svigiäd alora, cmenzand con vendicä ben ben l'ingiuria fata am 'sta dona, el dventò un persecutor acanid 'd tut quii che da ché mument in pò i avess cumess qualcosa contra l'unor dla su curona.

== Sample text ==
Article 1 of the Universal Declaration of Human Rights in Sammarinese:

Tot j essèri umèn i nàs lébri e cumpagn in dignità e dirét. Lou i è dutid ad rasoun e ad cuscinza e i à da operè, ognun ti cunfrunt at ch'j ilt, sa sentimint ad fratelènza.

Article 1 of the Universal Declaration of Human Rights in English:

All human beings are born free and equal in dignity and rights. They are endowed with reason and conscience and should act towards one another in a spirit of brotherhood.
