= Micronesian =

Micronesian describes something of, from, or related to Micronesia, a subregion of Oceania composed of hundreds of small islands in the Pacific Ocean.

Micronesian may refer to:

== People and society ==
- Micronesian people, people from the general region of Micronesia
- Micronesian citizen, a citizen of the Federated States of Micronesia, an independent sovereign island nation
  - Micronesian passport, issued by the Federated States of Micronesia
- Micronesian Americans, Americans descended from people of the Federated States of Micronesia
- Micronesian Japanese, people from Japan who settled in Micronesia in the first half of the 20th century
- Micronesian mythology, the traditional belief systems of the people of Micronesia
- Micronesian languages, twenty languages forming a family of Oceanic languages
- Micronesian Pidgin English, an English-based pidgin language spoken in nineteenth-century Micronesia

== Biology ==
- Micronesian imperial pigeon, a species of bird in the family Columbidae
- Micronesian kingfisher, a group of kingfishers from the Pacific Islands of Guam, Pohnpei and Palau
- Micronesian megapode, an endangered megapode which inhabits islands of the Western Pacific Ocean
- Micronesian myzomela, a species of bird in the honeyeater family, Meliphagidaeyes
- Micronesian starling, a species of starling in the family Sturnidae
- Micronesian swiftlet, a species of swift in the family Apodidae

== Other ==
- Micronesian Games, a quadrennial international multi-sport event within the Micronesian region

== See also ==
- Pacific Islander
