= Nepal (disambiguation) =

Nepal is a country in South Asia.

Nepal may also refer to:

- Kingdom of Nepal, a kingdom in Asia from 1768 to 2008
- Gorkha Kingdom, a kingdom in South Asia preceding the Nepali Kingdom
- Greater Nepal, an idea extending Nepal into Indian territory occupied between 1791 and 1816
- Newar language (Nepal Bhasa), a Sino-Tibetan language spoken natively by the Newar people
- Nepal (band), an Argentine thrash metal band
- Népal (rapper) (1990–2019), French rapper
- Nepal (surname), Nepali surname
  - Madhav Kumar Nepal (born 1953), Prime Minister of Nepal from May 2009 to February 2011

== See also ==
- Nepa (disambiguation)
