= Marocain =

The word Marocain can mean:

- Cinsaut, a wine grape
- Carignan, another wine grape
- marocain, or crêpe marocain, a ribbed crape (textile)
- The French word for "Moroccan"
