= Marco Berardi (Sammarinese footballer) =

Sammarinese footballer

Personal information
- Full name: Marco Berardi
- Date of birth: 12 February 1993 (age 33)
- Place of birth: San Marino
- Position: Defender

Senior career*
Years	Team	Apps	(Gls)
2014–2019	Folgore	87	(0)

International career^{‡}
2015–2017	San Marino	8	(0)
- * Club domestic league appearances and goals as of 18 July 2020 ‡ National team caps and goals as of 18 July 2020

Marco Berardi (born 12 February 1993) is a former Sammarinese football player who played as a defender.

== Career ==
Berardi debuted with the senior national team on 5 September 2015 in a UEFA Euro 2016 qualifying match against England.
