= Nepal (surname) =

Nepal (Nepali: नेपाल) is a common surname found among the Hill Brahmin people of Nepal, alternate spelling of the surname include Naipal or Nepalaya. The origin of people with surname Nepal is the Nepa village of Dullu. All Nepal surname families trace their origin to Sarvagyadhar Pandit, who started living in the Nepa Birta and later people referred to him and his descendants with the surname Nepal. Nepals are predominantly found in hilly regions of Nepal like Palpa, Dailekh and Panchthar. People with the surname Nepal can be also found in Indian states like Sikkim, Assam, and in countries like Bhutan and Myanmar.They belong to the Ghritkaushik (घृतकौशिक) gotra along with Khanal, Baral, Pandit and karki(Sutar). It is considered that the surname 'Naipul' or 'Naipaul' is an Anglicized form of the surname Nepal.

== Notable people with Nepal/Naipal/Naipaul surname ==
- Madhav Kumar Nepal (born 1953), 34th Prime Minister of Nepal
- Kul Prasad Nepal, Nepali politician
- Jeetu Nepal (born 1975), Nepali actor and comedian
- V. S. Naipaul (1932–2018), British Nobel Laureate of Indo-Nepalese origin
- Seepersad Naipaul (1906–1953), Trinidadian writer
- Shiva Naipaul (1945–1985), Indo-Trinidadian and British novelist and journalist
- Pradeep Nepal (1954–2025), Nepali politician and writer
