= Montserratian =

Montserratian may refer to:

- Something of, from, or related to Montserrat, a British overseas territory located in the Leeward Islands, part of the chain of islands called the Lesser Antilles in the Caribbean Sea
  - A person from Montserrat, or of Montserratian descent. For information about the Montserratian people, see Demographics of Montserrat and Culture of Montserrat. For specific persons, see List of Montserratians.
  - Note that there is no language called "Montserratian". For the most widely spoken languages in Montserrat, see Languages of Montserrat.
  - Montserratian cuisine
