= Venezuela (disambiguation) =

Venezuela is a country in South America.

Venezuela may also refer to:

== Places ==
=== States ===
- First Republic of Venezuela, the first independent government of Venezuela
- Second Republic of Venezuela, republic founded by Simón Bolívar in 1813
- Third Republic of Venezuela, 1817–1819, superseded by Gran Colombia
- Gran Colombia, 1819 union of Venezuela and other South American states
- Republic of Venezuela, 1953–1999

=== Localities ===
- Venezuela (Buenos Aires Underground), a metro station in Buenos Aires, Argentina
- Venezuela (Pueblo), Río Piedras, Puerto Rico
- Venezuela, Cuba, municipality in Ciego de Ávila Province

== Other ==
- Venezuela, a 1958 album by Aldemaro Romero
- Venezuela, a synonym of the genus of cellar spiders Mecolaesthus

== See also ==
- Venezuelan (disambiguation)
- Valenzuela (disambiguation)
