= NEPA =

NEPA may refer to:

== Legislation ==
- National Environmental Policy Act, a 1970 environmental law of the United States

== Organisms ==
- Nepa (bug), a genus of aquatic insects
- Nepa (plant), a genus of legumes

== Organizations ==
- National Electric Power Authority in Nigeria, the Power Holdings Company of Nigeria
- National Economic Protectionism Association, a non-government organization of the Philippines
- NEPA Lagos F.C., a Nigerian association football team
- NEPA Breakers, an American Basketball Association team
- National Environment and Planning Agency, part of the Jamaica Civil Service Association
- National Environmental Protection Agency (Australia), Australian government agency

== Places ==
=== Nepal ===
- Nepa (village), a locality in Nepal
- Nepa kingdom, a mountainous kingdom mentioned in the Mahabharata
  - Nepa, the historical name of Nepal as mentioned in the Ramayana
- Nepa Valley, historical name for Kathmandu Valley

=== Other places ===
- Nepa (Martian crater), a crater on Mars
- Nepa (river), a tributary of the Nizhnyaya Tunguska in Russia
- Northeastern Pennsylvania, a region roughly synonymous with the Coal Region

== Other uses ==
- Nuclear Energy for the Propulsion of Aircraft, United States Army Air Forces project
- Stefano Nepa (born 2001), Italian motorcycle rider
