= Benen =

Benen may refer to:

- Steve Benen (born 1973), American political writer, blogger, and producer of The Rachel Maddow Show
- Saint Benen (Benignus of Armagh; fl. AD 450), Irish chieftain
- Benén, bard and author of Benén's Poem

== See also ==
- Benin (disambiguation)
