= Nepali =

Nepali or Nepalese may refer to something or someone of, from, the nation of Nepal.

== Concerning Nepal ==
- Nepalis, citizens of Nepal
- Nepali language, an Indo-Aryan language found in Nepal
- Nepali literature
- Nepali cuisine
- Nepali culture
- Nepali cinema
- Nepali music

== Other uses ==
- Nepali (film), a 2008 Indian Tamil-language film

== See also ==
- Nepal (disambiguation)
- Languages of Nepal
