= Martiniquais =

Martiniquais may refer to:

- Something of, from, or related to Martinique, an island in the Caribbean Sea
- A person from Martinique, or of Martiniquais descent; see Demographics of Martinique and Culture of Martinique
