= Congolese people =

Congolese people may refer to:

- People from the following countries and regions:
  - Congo Basin, the sedimentary basin of the Congo River
  - Republic of the Congo (Congo-Brazzaville), the former French Congo
  - Democratic Republic of the Congo (Congo-Kinshasa), the former Belgian Congo
- Kongo people, a Bantu ethnic group in the Congo region

== See also ==
- Congolese (disambiguation)
- List of Congolese people (disambiguation)
  - List of Congolese people from the Democratic Republic of the Congo
  - List of Congolese people from the Republic of the Congo
