= Congolese =

Congolese or Kongolese may refer to:

== African peoples ==
- Congolese people (disambiguation)
- Kongo people, a Bantu ethnic group who live along the Atlantic coast of Africa from Pointe-Noire (Republic of Congo) to Luanda, Angola, primarily defined by speaking of the common language Kikongo
- Kongo language, the Bantu language spoken by the Bakongo and Bandundu people living in the Democratic Republic of the Congo, the Republic of the Congo and Angola
- Democratic Republic of the Congo cuisine

== African countries ==
Republic of the Congo Democratic Republic of the Congo

- Something of, from, or related to the Democratic Republic of the Congo, in Africa, through which the Congo River flows
  - Something of, from, or related to the former Republic of the Congo, in Africa, the modern-day Democratic Republic
- Something of, from, or related to the Republic of the Congo (Brazzaville), in Africa, located west of the Congo River
  - Something of, from, or related to the former French Congo, in Africa, the modern-day Republic of the Congo
  - Something of, from, or related to the former Belgian Congo, in Africa, the predecessor of the Republic of the Congo (Léopoldville)
  - Something of, from, or related to the former Congo Free State, in Africa, the predecessor of the Belgian Congo
- Something of, from, or related to the former Kingdom of Kongo, in Africa, located south of the Congo River

== See also ==
- Congolese Americans
- Languages of the Republic of the Congo
- Languages of the Democratic Republic of the Congo, a multilingual country where an estimated total of 242 languages are spoken
- Congolese Civil War (disambiguation)
- Congo (disambiguation)
- Congolese National Movement-Lumumba
- Congolese music (disambiguation)
