= Cameronians =

Cameronians may refer to:

- Cameronian group, a seventeenth-century religious group in Scotland named for its leader, Richard Cameron
- 26th (Cameronian) Regiment of Foot, a regiment of the British Army raised from among the Cameronians, in existence from 1689 to 1881
- Cameronians (Scottish Rifles), a regiment of the British Army formed from the 26th Foot in 1881, and disbanded in 1968
- Cameronians F.C., an association football club associated with the regiment

== See also ==
- Cameroonian (disambiguation)
