= List of demonyms for U.S. states and territories =

This is a list of demonyms used to designate the citizens of specific states, federal district, and territories of the United States. Official English-language demonyms are established by the United States Government Publishing Office (USGPO); however, many other terms are in common use. Though most states use suffixes in their demonyms, Hawaii is an anomaly, as the USGPO demonym is "Hawaii resident." This is to distinguish people of various ethnic groups who live in Hawaii from the native Hawaiians.

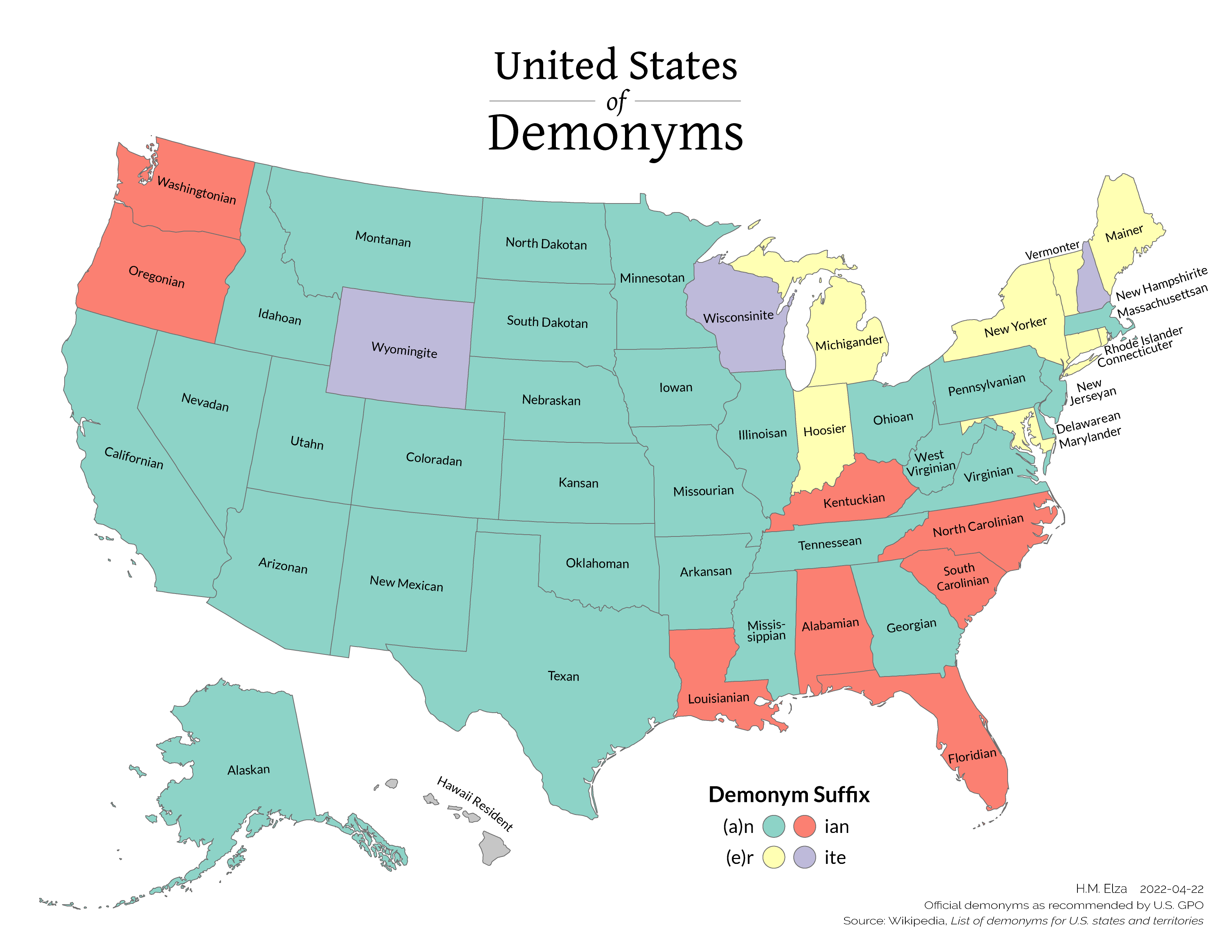
Map of state demonyms of the United States colored by suffix

== List ==
Jurisdiction	Recommended by USGPO	Alternatives		
Jurisdiction	Recommended by USGPO	Official	Unofficial	Archaic
Alabama	Alabamian		Alabaman	
Alaska	Alaskan			
American Samoa			American Samoan	
Arizona	Arizonan		Arizonian	
Arkansas	Arkansan		Arkansasan, Arkansawyer, Arkie	
California	Californian			Prune Picker, Californios
Colorado	Coloradan			Coloradoan
Connecticut	Connecticuter		Nutmegger	
Delaware	Delawarean		Blue Hen's Chicken, Muskrat	
District of Columbia	Washingtonian			
Florida	Floridian		Alligator, Fly-Up-the-Creek	
(Georgia (U.S. state)) Georgia	Georgian		Buzzard, Cracker, Goober-grabber	
Guam			Guamanian	
Hawaii	Hawaii resident		Islander, Kamaʻāina. The Associated Press Stylebook restricts use of "Hawaiian" to people of Native Hawaiian descent.	
Idaho	Idahoan			
Illinois	Illinoisan		Illinoisian, Illinoian, Flatlander, Sucker, Sand-hiller, Egyptian	
Indiana	Hoosier		Indianan (former GPO demonym replaced by Hoosier in 2016)	Indianian
Iowa	Iowan		Hawkeye	
Kansas	Kansan		Grasshopper, Jayhawker, Sunflower	
Kentucky	Kentuckian		Corncracker, Kentuckyan	
Louisiana	Louisianian		Louisianan	
Maine	Mainer		Down Easter or Downeaster, Mainiac, Yankee (rare)	
Maryland	Marylander			
Massachusetts	Massachusettsan	Bay Stater (official term used by state government) and Citizen of the Commonwealth (identifier used in state law)	Massachusettsian, Massachusite, Masshole (derogatory as an exonym; however, it can be affectionate when applied as an endonym)	
Michigan	Michigander	Michigander	Michiganian, Wolverine, Michiganite, Yooper/Troll (for residents of the Upper Peninsula and Lower Peninsula, respectively), Michigoose (used specifically for female residents, as a play on "Michi-gander")	
Minnesota	Minnesotan			
Mississippi	Mississippian			
Missouri	Missourian		Missouran	
Montana	Montanan			
Nebraska	Nebraskan		Cornhusker	Bugeater
Nevada	Nevadan			
New Hampshire	New Hampshirite		New Hampshireman or New Hampshirewoman, Granite Stater, Granite Boys	
New Jersey	New Jerseyan		New Jerseyite	
New Mexico	New Mexican			
(New York (state)) New York	New Yorker		Knickerbocker	
North Carolina	North Carolinian		Tar Heel, Tar Boiler	
North Dakota	North Dakotan			
Northern Mariana Islands			Mariana Islander	
Ohio	Ohioan		Buckeye	Ohian
Oklahoma	Oklahoman		Okie, Sooner	
Oregon	Oregonian			
Pennsylvania	Pennsylvanian		Penn, Quaker, Pennamite	
Puerto Rico	Puerto Rican		Boricua	
Rhode Island	Rhode Islander		Swamp Yankee	
South Carolina	South Carolinian		Sandlapper	
South Dakota	South Dakotan			
Tennessee	Tennessean		Volunteer, Butternut	Big Bender
Texas	Texan		Texian (Anglo-Texan, historical), Tejano (Hispano-Texan)	Texican
Utah	Utahn	Utahn	Utahan (a common exonym not typically used by Utahns)	
Vermont	Vermonter		Woodchuck	
(United States Virgin Islands) Virgin Islands	Virgin Islander			
Virginia	Virginian			
(Washington (state)) Washington	Washingtonian			
West Virginia	West Virginian		Mountaineer	
Wisconsin	Wisconsinite		Badger, Cheesehead, Sconnie, Wisconsonian, Wisconsese	
Wyoming	Wyomingite		Wyomese, Wyomingian	

== See also ==
- List of adjectival and demonymic forms of place names
- List of adjectival and demonymic forms for countries and nations
- List of adjectivals and demonyms for cities
