= Bonaire (disambiguation) =

Bonaire is an island in the Caribbean Sea, that forms part of the Netherlands.

Bonaire may also refer to:

- Bonaire, Georgia, an unincorporated town in the United States
- HNLMS Bonaire, a steamship of the Royal Netherlands Navy

== See also ==
- Bon Air (disambiguation), the name of many different places in the United States
- Bonnaire, a surname
