= Bonnaire =

Bonnaire is a surname. Notable people with the surname include:

- Julien Bonnaire (born 1978), French rugby union player
- Olivier Bonnaire (born 1983), French cyclist
- Sandrine Bonnaire (born 1967), French actress, film director, and screenwriter

== See also ==
- Bonaire (disambiguation)
