= Visa policy of Micronesia =

Policy on permits required to enter Micronesia

All visitors to the Federated States of Micronesia may enter without a visa for up to 30, 90 or 365 days, depending on their nationality.

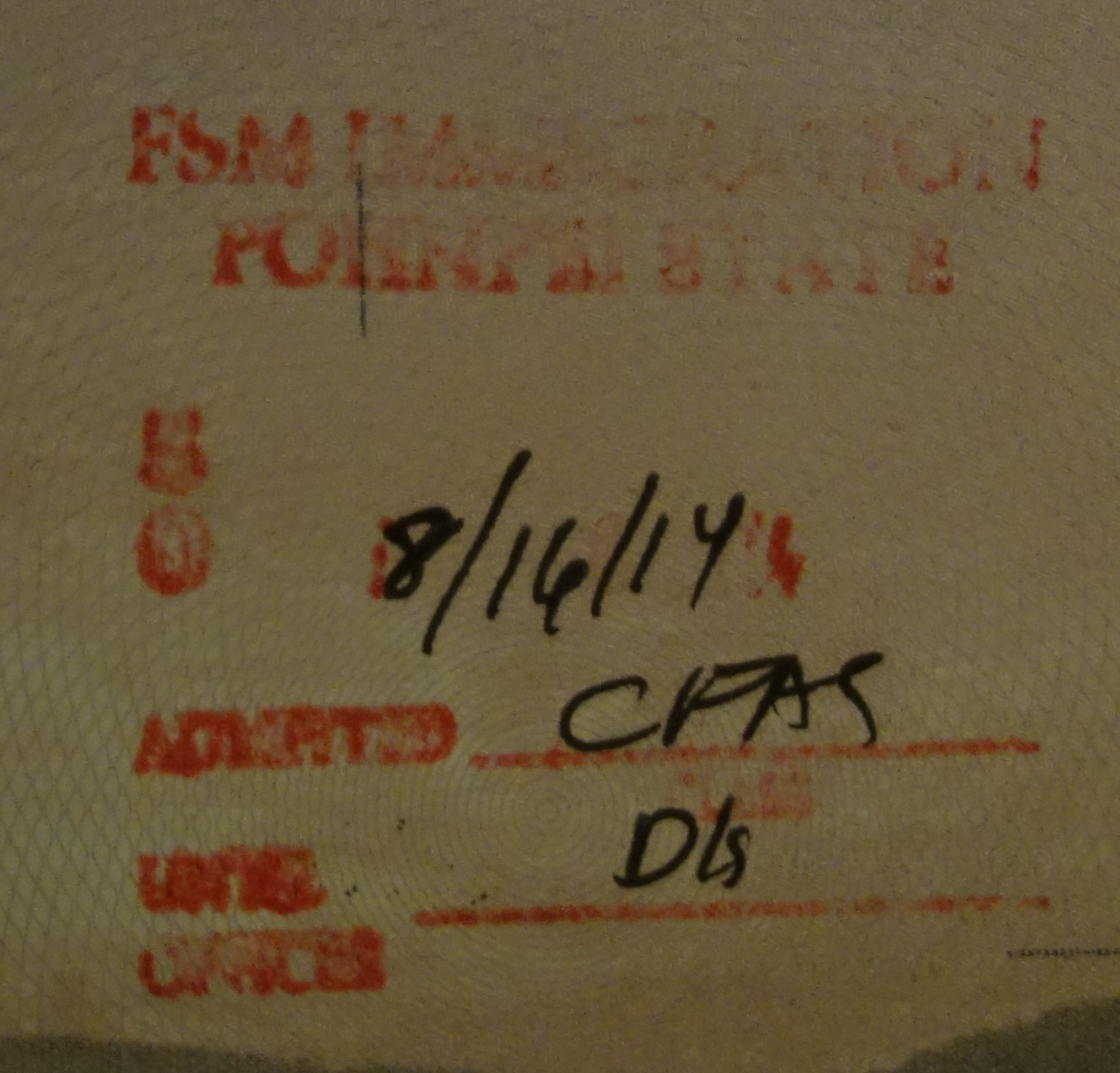
Passport stamp of Micronesia

All visitors must hold a passport valid for at least 120 days before the date of arrival.

== Visa policy map ==
Visa policy of Micronesia The Federated States of Micronesia Visa not required (365 days) Visa not required (90 days) Visa not required (30 days)

== Visa exemption ==
Citizens of the following countries may enter Micronesia for the following period in accordance with bilateral agreements:

365 days

- Marshall Islands
- Palau
- United States

90 days within any 180 days

- European Union member states (except Ireland)

- Iceland
- Liechtenstein
- Norway
- Switzerland

30 days, extendable to 60 days

- All other countries and territories

Date of visa changes

Under the Immigration Act 1980

- 18 December 1980: All countries and territories - 30 days
- 13 December 1988: United States (including nationals of the US) - 365 days
- 26 December 2002: Marshall Islands and Palau - 365 days
- 20 September 2016: European Union member states (except Ireland), Iceland, Liechtenstein, Norway, Switzerland - 90 days

== Visitor statistics ==
Most visitors arriving in Micronesia were from the following countries of nationality:

Country	2015	2014	2013
United States	6,671	7,953	7,967
Philippines	5,038	5,787	6,486
Japan	3,397	4,126	4,570
China	2,495	2,732	4,531
Australia	1,075	1,288	1,429
New Zealand	286	301	310
Canada	220	291	391
Other Asia	5,759	7,310	10,472
Pacific Islands	2,839	2,747	2,584
Europe	2,163	2,531	2,981
Total	30,240	35,440	42,109

== See also ==
- Visa requirements for Micronesian citizens
