= Gabonese =

Gabonese may refer to:

- Something of, from, or related to the country of Gabon
- A citizen of Gabon, see demographics of Gabon
- A person from Gabon, or of Gabonese descent; see ethnic groups in Gabon
- Gabonese cuisine
- Gabonese culture

== See also ==
- Languages of Gabon
