= Central African =

Central African may refer to several places:

- Something of, from, or related to Central Africa, a region in the center of Africa
- Something of, from, or related to the Central African Republic, a country in Central Africa
  - A person native or indigenous to Central Africa, or of Central African descent. For information about the Central African people, see Demographics of the Central African Republic and Culture of the Central African Republic. For specific persons, see List of people from the Central African Republic.
  - Note that there is no language called "Central African". See Languages of the Central African Republic.
- Something of, from, or related to the Central African Empire
