= Andorran =

Andorran may refer to:

- Something of, or related to Andorra, the European microstate
  - A person from Andorra or of Andorran descent; see List of Andorrans
  - Andorran cuisine
- A resident of Andorra, Teruel, Spain

== See also ==
- Andorian, a fictional extraterrestrial race in the Star Trek franchise
