= Gambian =

Gambian may refer to:

- Something of, from, or related to the country of the Gambia
- Gambian people, a person from the Gambia, or of Gambian descent
- Culture of the Gambia
- Gambian cuisine

== See also ==
- Languages of the Gambia
