= Benin (disambiguation) =

Benin is a modern country in Africa.

Benin may also refer to:

- Kingdom of Benin, a historical state in Western Africa
- Republic of Benin (1967), a short-lived former state of Nigeria in 1967
- Benin City, a city in Nigeria
- Bight of Benin, a bight on the western African coast
- Benin River, a river in southern Nigeria near the Egbema tribe
- Benin, a fictional, movie-only female villain in Bleach: Memories of Nobody

== See also ==
- Benen (disambiguation)
