= Bahamian =

Bahamian may refer to anything and anyone of or from The Bahamas, an island country located in the Atlantic Ocean northeast of Cuba.

- Bahamians, citizens of The Bahamas.
- Bahamian Creole, an English-based creole language spoken in The Bahamas.
- Bahamian English, a variety of the English language.
- Culture of The Bahamas, a hybrid of African, European, and other cultures.
- Demographics of The Bahamas, population, ethnicity, and other aspects of the population of The Bahamas.

== See also ==
- List of Bahamians, notable people from The Bahamas or of Bahamian descent.
