= Grenadian =

Grenadian is an adjective describing someone or something from the country of Grenada.

It may refer to:

- Grenadian Creole English, an Eastern Atlantic Creole
- Grenadian Creole French or Patois, a variety of Antillean Creole French
- Grenadian cuisine, a diversity of foods
- Grenadian dollar, a history and overview of the currency
- Grenadian music, a mix of styles
- Grenadian people, the demographics of the country
- Grenadian politics, an overview of the structure and functioning of the government

== See also ==
- Grenadine (disambiguation)
