= Micronesian passport =

Passport issued to Micronesian citizens

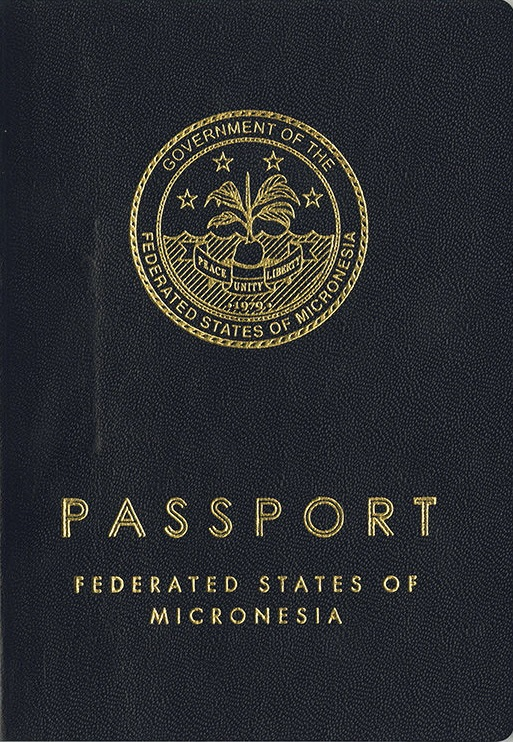
- The front cover of a Micronesian passport.
- Type: Passport
- Issued by: Federated States of Micronesia
- Purpose: Identification
- Eligibility: Micronesian citizenship

A Micronesian passport is the regular travel document issued to citizens of the Federated States of Micronesia to facilitate international travel.

== Passport cover ==
Micronesian passports are blue with the word "PASSPORT" written in English above the Seal of the Federated States of Micronesia emblazoned in the center, with the inscription "Federated States of Micronesia" in small gold letters beneath.

== Information ==
The information given below is printed on the identification page.

1. Type
2. Photo of Passport Holder
3. Passport Number
4. Given name(s)
5. Date of birth
6. Sex
7. Place of birth
8. Place of Issue
9. Date of expiry
10. Surname
11. Nationality
12. Residence
13. Date of issue
14. Authority

== Visa requirements ==
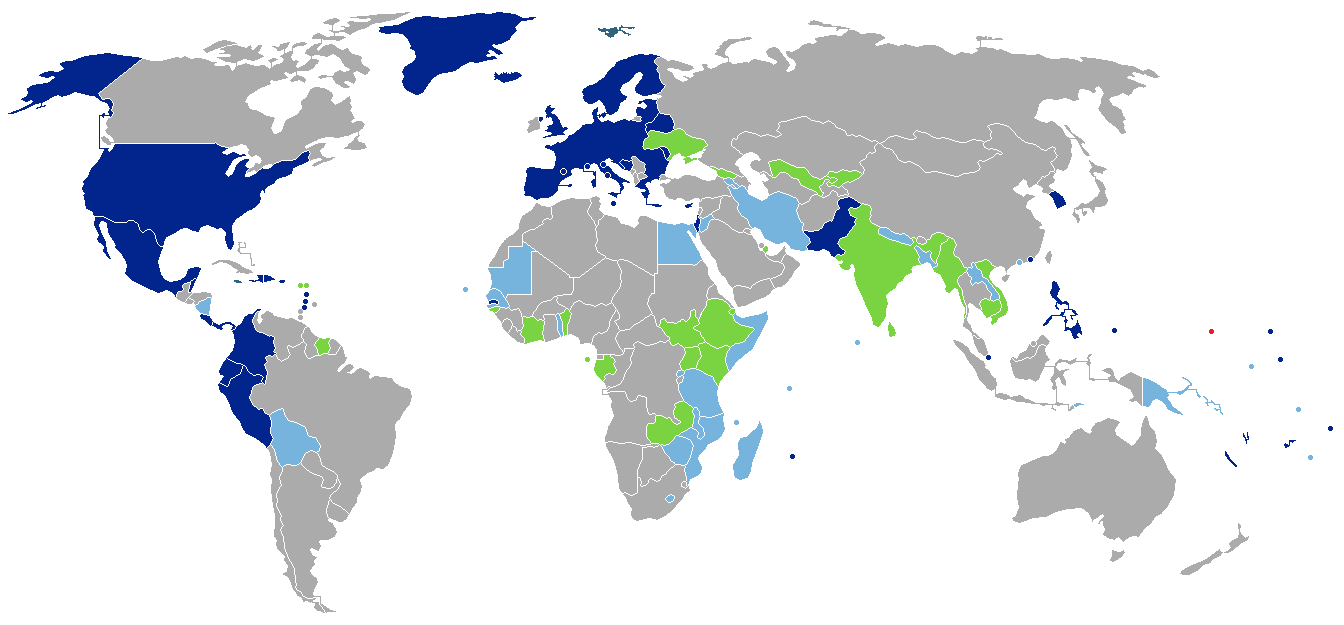
Visa requirements for Micronesian citizens Micronesia Visa-free Visa on arrival

As of 1 January 2017, Micronesian citizens had visa-free or visa on arrival access to 106 countries and territories, ranking the Micronesian passport 51st in terms of travel freedom (tied with Russian passport) according to the Henley visa restrictions index.

Micronesia signed a mutual visa waiver agreement with Schengen Area countries on 20 September 2016.

== United States visa ==
Micronesian passport holders with Form I-94 or Form I-94A, showing non-immigrant admission, can travel or enter the United States without any visa requirements in accordance with the Compact of Free Association between the US and the Federated States of Micronesia.

== History ==
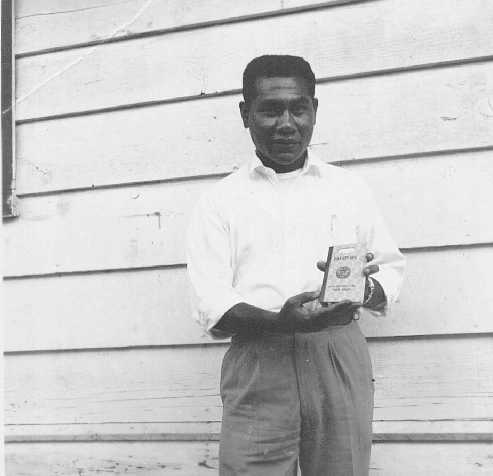
Dr. Ngas Kansou of Truk, recipient of first Trust Territory passport, 1959.

Prior to the independence of the Federated States of Micronesia, Micronesians traveled internationally on documents issued by the US authorities to the citizens of the Trust Territory of the Pacific. Since October 1959, these documents were called Trust Territory Passports, and had maroon covers. They replaced earlier "Travel Documents", which were simply folded sheets of paper. The phasing out of TTPI documents was planned to coincide with independence, and Micronesia issued its first passports as an independent state in November 1986. The first series of passports had three types: regular (blue cover), official (black cover) and diplomatic (burgundy cover) and were issued at the cost of $15.

== See also ==
- Visa requirements for Micronesian citizens
- Foreign relations of Federated States of Micronesia
- List of passports
