= Chadian =

Chadian may refer to:

- Something of, from, or related to the country of Chad
- A person from Chad, or of Chadian descent. For information about the Chadian people, see Demographics of Chad and Culture of Chad. For specific persons, see List of Chadians.
- Chadian Arabic, a dialect of Arabic, is the lingua franca of Chad.
- Chadic languages. See also Languages of Chad.
- Chadian (stage), a substage in the British stratigraphy of the Carboniferous
- Chadian (town) (茶淀镇), town in Binhai New Area, Tianjin, China

== See also ==
- Chandio
