= Names of Transnistria =

Although most commonly known in English as Transnistria, the official name of the region is Pridnestrovie. Here is a detailed explanation of the names used for Transnistria, both official and unofficial, as they appear in the local languages and in English.

== Official names ==
Transnistria has three official languages: Russian, "Moldovan" (Romanian in the Moldovan Cyrillic alphabet), and Ukrainian. In each of the three national languages the name reads:

- Russian: Приднестровская Молдавская Республика (Pridnestrovskaya Moldavskaya Respublika), abbreviated ПМР
- Moldovan Cyrillic: Република Молдовеняскэ Нистрянэ (Republica Moldovenească Nistreană), abbreviated РМН
- Ukrainian: Придністровська Молдавська Республіка (Prydnistrovs'ka Moldavs'ka Respublika), abbreviated ПМР

The abbreviations of each name in the official languages also appear on the Transnistrian coat of arms.

The Constitution of Transnistria gives the official name in Russian as Pridnestrovskaia Moldavskaia Respublika (PMR).

Some authorities, such as the President's office, translate this name to English as the Pridnestrovian Moldavian Republic. The official abbreviation in English is PMR.

The official shortform name (the name in daily usage) in Russian is "Приднестровье", Pridnestrovie, which literally means "Cisdniestria". Short name in Romanian Nistrenia (Нистреня in Cyrillic), in Ukrainian Придністров'я - Prydnistrovia. The PMR government favours not to translate the country name when written in English. Per a 2000 presidential naming decree, the official transliteration in Latin script is Pridnestrovie.

The Supreme Council passed a law on 5 September 2024 which banned the use of the term “Transnistria” within the region, imposing a fine of 360 rubles or up to 15 days imprisonment for using the name in public.

== Names used by Moldova ==
The Government of Moldova refers to the area as the Administrative-Territorial Units of the Left Bank of the Dniester:

- Romanian: Unitățile Administrativ-Teritoriale din stînga Nistrului
- Russian: Административно-территориальные единицы левобережья Днестра
- Ukrainian: Автономне територіальне утворення з особливим правовим статусом Придністров'я

== Other names in use ==
In Russian, the names used for Transnistria are always consistently either Pridnestrovskaia Moldavskaia Respublica or Pridnestrovie (the two official names, long- and short- respectively). However, in English a wide variety of names have been used to describe the region, among them: Trans-Dniester, Transdnistria, Transdniestria, Transdniestr, Trans-Dniestria, Transdniester, Transniestria, Transdnestr, also Trans-Dnjestr and Trans-Dnjester.

The European Court of Human Rights used the name Moldavian Republic of Transdniestria or Moldovan Republic of Transnistria (MRT), while Organization for Security and Co-operation in Europe and others sometimes refer to it as the Transnistrian Moldovan Republic (TMR). Author Charles King, in his book The Moldovans, uses the names Dnestr Republic and Dnestr Moldovan Republic (DMR).

== Naming background ==
All of the names cited above have their root in the name of the river Dniester. In Romanian, the river is known as Nistru. The name "Transnistria" is Romanian and literally means "beyond the river Dniester". The name has been in use in Romania as early as 1924.

In both Russian and Ukrainian, the name has a more literal meaning as it is called "Cisdniestria" which means "On this side of the Dniester", "By-the-Dniester" or "On-the-Dniester" (as opposed to beyond the Dniester).
