= Cameroonian =

Cameroonian may refer to:

- Something of, from, or related to the country of Cameroon
  - Culture of Cameroon
  - Cameroonians
  - Demographics of Cameroon
  - Lists of Cameroonians
- Cameroonian Pidgin English
  - Languages of Cameroon
- Cameroonian cuisine

== See also ==
- Cameroons or British Cameroon, a former British Mandate territory in British West Africa
- Cameronian, a radical faction of Scottish Covenanters in the 17th and 18th centuries
- Cameronians (disambiguation)
