= Jordanian =

Jordanian may refer to:

- Something of, from, or related to Jordan, a country in the Near East
- Jordanian culture
- Jordanian people; see Demographics of Jordan
- Jordanian cuisine
- Jordanian Arabic
- Royal Jordanian, an airline

== See also ==
- List of Jordanians
