= Faetano =

Castello of San Marino

Faetano Faitén (Romagnol)
- Castello
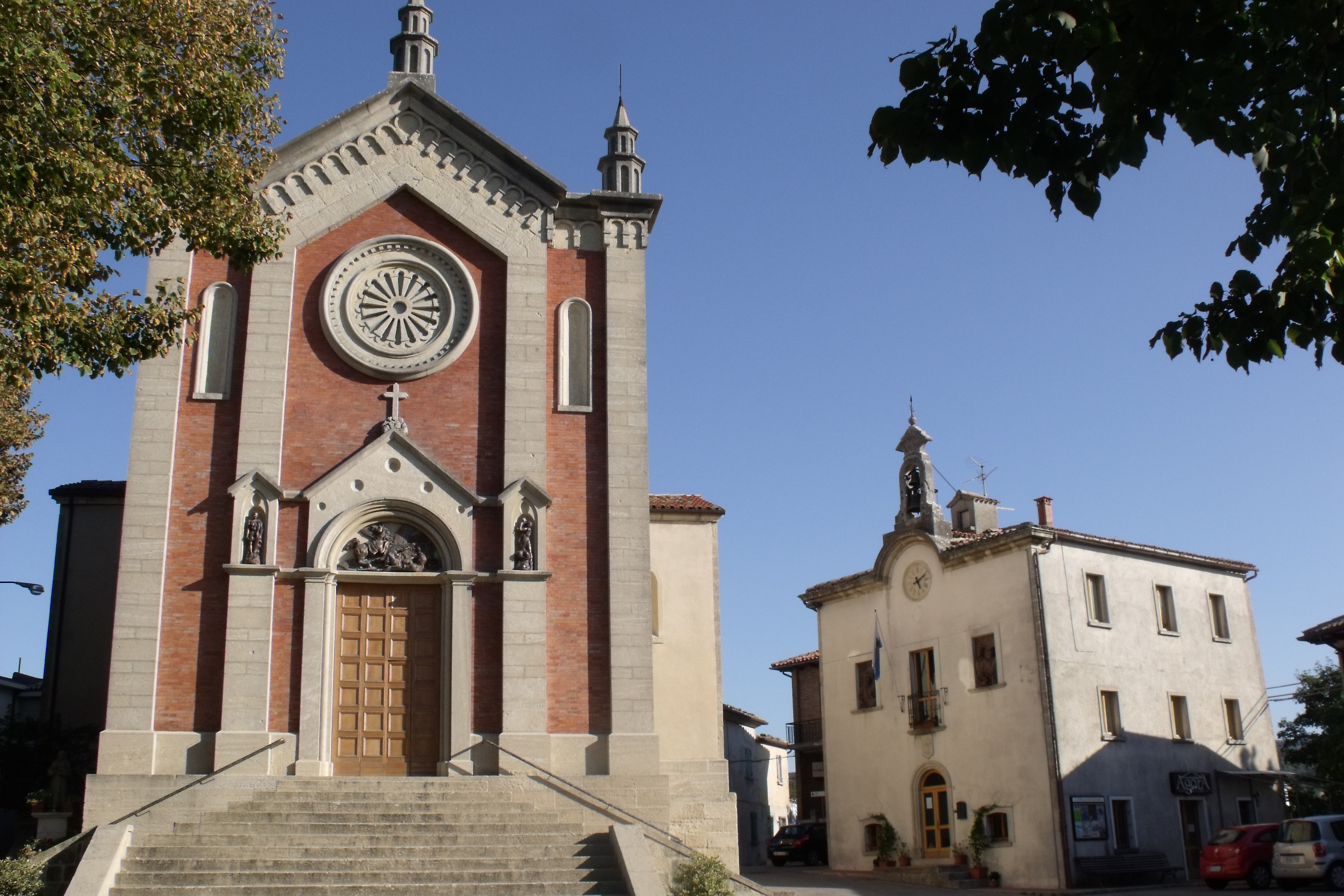
- Church of San Paolo Apostolo and the town hall (Casa del Castello) in Faetano

- Flag Coat of arms

- Faetano's location in San Marino

- Location within San Marino
- Coordinates: 43°55′32″N 12°29′54″E
- Country: San Marino
- Curazie: List: Cà Chiavello, Calligaria, Corianino, Monte Pulito

Government
  - Capitano: Angelo Gabrielli (Faetano Viva/PDCS; since 2025)

Area
  - Total: 7.75 km^{2} (2.99 sq mi)
- Elevation: 362 m (1,188 ft)

Population (January 2025)
  - Total: 1,188
- Time zone: UTC+1 (CET)
  - Summer (DST): CEST
- Postal code: 47896
- Climate: Cfa
- Website: www.gov.sm/pub1/GovSM/Istituzioni-e-Forze/Giunte-di-Castello/Castello-di-Faetano.html

Faetano (Romagnol: Faitén) is one of the nine castelli of San Marino. It occupies an area of 7.75 km^{2} (2.99 sq mi). As of 2023, it had a population of 1,173 inhabitants, and was the third least populated castello of San Marino.

== History ==
The territory of San Marino consisted only of Mount Titano until 1463. The nation became part of an alliance against Sigismondo Pandolfo Malatesta, the Lord of Rimini, who was defeated. The Pope Pius II gifted the towns of Fiorentino, Montegiardino, and Serravalle to San Marino as a reward for being part of the alliance. Later, Faetano voluntarily joined the country in 1463, and the boundaries have remained the same ever since. However, the original castle and settlement were razed due to fears of reprisal by the locals.

The name of the castelli comes from the beech tree, which is also present in its coat of arms. The region developed as a center of pottery production, with the Ceramica Faetano known as a symbol of artisanal excellence. The center of the town square hosts the Church of St. Paul, which was consecrated in 1917. In the town house, a clock is hoisted on a stone bell tower. The clock is the oldest in San Marino and comes from the Parva Domus palace located near the Palazzo Pubblico mentioned in the 14th century.

== Geography ==
The country of San Marino is divided into nine municipalities (castelli) for administration. It has a land area of 7.75 km^{2} (2.99 sq mi). It extends from along the Marano valley towards Lake Faetano and Monte Pulito, and ends in Lodola. It borders the Sammarinese castelli of Fiorentino, Montegiardino, Borgo Maggiore, and Domagnano. It also shares borders with the Italian municipalities of Coriano, Montescudo, and Sassofeltrio.

Faetano contains four curazie–Cà Chiavello, Calligaria, Corianino, and Monte Pulito. The region had a population of 1,188 inhabitants in 2023, which makes it the second smallest subdivision of the country by population after Montegiardino.

=== Climate ===
Faetano has a humid subtropical climate (Köppen: Cfa).

Climate data for Faetano
Month	Jan	Feb	Mar	Apr	May	Jun	Jul	Aug	Sep	Oct	Nov	Dec	Year
Mean daily maximum °C (°F)	8.7 (47.7)	10.0 (50.0)	13.0 (55.4)	16.4 (61.5)	21.0 (69.8)	25.9 (78.6)	28.5 (83.3)	28.2 (82.8)	23.6 (74.5)	19.2 (66.6)	14.0 (57.2)	9.9 (49.8)	18.2 (64.8)
Daily mean °C (°F)	6.0 (42.8)	6.9 (44.4)	9.8 (49.6)	13.1 (55.6)	17.7 (63.9)	22.4 (72.3)	24.9 (76.8)	24.4 (75.9)	20.1 (68.2)	16.0 (60.8)	11.3 (52.3)	7.3 (45.1)	15.0 (59.0)
Mean daily minimum °C (°F)	3.7 (38.7)	4.2 (39.6)	6.7 (44.1)	9.8 (49.6)	14.2 (57.6)	18.6 (65.5)	20.9 (69.6)	20.7 (69.3)	16.8 (62.2)	13.2 (55.8)	9.0 (48.2)	5.0 (41.0)	11.9 (53.4)
Average precipitation mm (inches)	57.1 (2.25)	65.9 (2.59)	66.0 (2.60)	64.5 (2.54)	69.7 (2.74)	42.0 (1.65)	37.2 (1.46)	49.1 (1.93)	77.0 (3.03)	81.2 (3.20)	84.8 (3.34)	72.5 (2.85)	767 (30.18)
Source: Weather.Directory

== International relations ==
Faetano is twinned with:

- Pont-à-Vendin, France (2014)
