= Mahoran =

Mahoran may refer to:

- Something of, from, or related to Mayotte
- A person from Mayotte, or of Mahoran descent, as described in Demographics of Mayotte and Culture of Mayotte
- One of the languages of Mayotte
- Mahoran cuisine

== See also ==
- List of all pages beginning with "Mahoran"
