= Maldivian =

Maldivian may refer to:

- Maldivians, the ethnic group inhabiting the historic region of the Maldive Islands comprising what is now officially the Republic of Maldives and the island of Minicoy in Union territory of Lakshadweep, India
- Maldivian language ("Dhivehi language"), the language spoken in the historic region of the Maldive Islands comprising what is now officially the Republic of Maldives and the island of Minicoy in Union territory of Lakshadweep, India
- Maldivian cuisine
- Maldivian (airline), the airline division of Island Aviation Services based in Malé, in the Maldives
- Something of, from, or related to the Republic of Maldives
