= Comorian =

Comorian may refer to:

- Something of or pertaining to the Comoro Islands, a region of Africa including Comoros
- Something or someone of, from, or related to Comoros, a country in the Comoro Islands
- Comorian language, a set of Sabaki dialects (Bantu language)
