= Monte Pulito =

Curazia of Faetano, San Marino

- Curazia
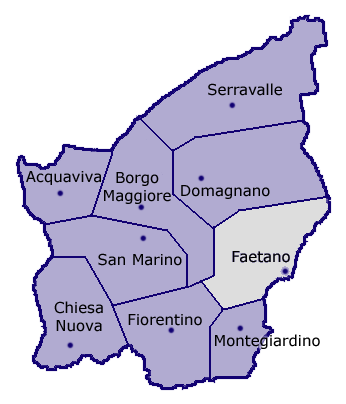
- Location of Faetano within San Marino

- Location within San Marino
- Coordinates: 43°55′31.26″N 12°29′0.72″E
- Country: San Marino
- Castello: Faetano
- Elevation: 250 m (820 ft)
- Demonym: montesi
- Time zone: UTC+1 (CET)
  - Summer (DST): UTC+2 (CEST)
- Postal code: 47896
- Area code: +378 (0549)

Monte Pulito is a curazia of San Marino, in the castello of Faetano.

== History ==
During the Second World War, between 17 and 20 September 1944, the hill around Monte Pulito was the site of a battle between the 4th Indian Division (British India) and the 278th Infantry Division (Nazi Germany). The engagement is known as "Battle of San Marino" or "Battle of Monte Pulito".

== Geography ==
Monte Pulito is located under the same named hill, on the road between Faetano and the city of San Marino.
