= Kosovar =

Kosovars are citizens of Kosovo. Kosovar or Kosovan may also refer to:

- Something of, from, or related to Kosovo
- Kosovo Albanians, ethnic Albanian from Kosovo
- Kosovars, nationals/ citizens of Kosovo
- Kosovar Chess Championship, founded in 1990
- Culture of Kosovo
- Kosovar cuisine, cuisine of Kosovo

== See also ==
- Demographics of Kosovo
- List of Kosovars
