= Guatemalan =

Guatemalan may refer to:

- Something of, from, or related to the country of Guatemala
- A person from Guatemala, or of Guatemalan descent. For information about the Guatemalan people, see Demographics of Guatemala and Culture of Guatemala. For specific persons, see List of Guatemalans.
- Note that there is no language called "Guatemalan". See Languages of Guatemala.
- Guatemalan cuisine
