= Hungarian =

Hungarian may refer to:

- Hungary, a country in Central Europe
- Kingdom of Hungary, state of Hungary, existing between 1000 and 1946
- Hungarians/Magyars, ethnic groups in Hungary
- Hungarian algorithm, a polynomial time algorithm for solving the assignment problem
- Hungarian language, a Uralic language spoken in Hungary and all neighbouring countries
- Hungarian notation, a naming convention in computer programming
- Hungarian cuisine, the cuisine of Hungary and the Hungarians
