= Ivorian =

Ivorian may refer to:

== Country ==
- Something of, from, or related to the country of Ivory Coast
  - A person from Ivory Coast, or of Ivorian descent (see Demographics of Ivory Coast and List of Ivorians)

== Other ==
- In stratigraphy, the Ivorian substage is the upper part of the Tournaisian stage, itself part of the Lower Carboniferous
