= Sri Lankan =

Sri Lankan or Ceylonese may refer to:

- Something of, from, or related to the country of Sri Lanka
  - Demographics of Sri Lanka
- Sri Lankan people, or of Sri Lankan descent; this includes:
  - Sinhalese people, the ethnic majority
  - Sri Lankan Tamils, an ethnic minority
  - Sri Lankan Moors, an ethnic minority
  - Sri Lankan Malays, an ethnic minority
  - Burgher people, an ethnic minority
- Sri Lankan culture
- Sri Lankan cuisine
- SriLankan Airlines
