= Kyrgyz =

Kyrgyz, Kirghiz, or Kirgiz may refer to:

- Someone or something related to Kyrgyzstan or Kyrgyz people
- Kyrgyz people, Turkic ethnic group in Central Asia
- Kyrgyz language, Turkic language of the Kipchak branch
- The Fuyu Kyrgyz language in Northeastern China
- Yenisei Kyrgyz, Ancient Turkic people
- An obsolete term used in Russian Empire to refer to some other Central Asian peoples: Kazakhs ("Kirgiz-Kaysaks"), Karakalpaks ("Kirgiz-Karakalpaks")
