= Venezuelan (disambiguation) =

Venezuelan may refer to:

- Something of, from, or related to the country of Venezuela
- Venezuelan Spanish, the dialect of Spanish spoken in Venezuela
- Venezuelan cuisine
- Something of, from, or related to Venezuela, Cuba, a city in Cuba

== See also ==
- Venezuela (disambiguation)
- Lists of Venezuelans
