= List of Congolese people =

List of Congolese people may refer to:

- List of people from the Democratic Republic of the Congo
- List of people from the Republic of the Congo
