= Bon Air =

Bon Air is the name of multiple municipalities and places in the United States:

- Bon Air, Alabama
- Bon Air, Sumner County, Tennessee
- Bon Air, White County, Tennessee
- Bon Air, Virginia
- Bon Air, Louisville, Kentucky
- Bon Air (Pittsburgh), Pennsylvania
- Bon Air (Fallston, Maryland), listed on the NRHP in Maryland
- Bon Air (Elkton, Virginia), listed on the NRHP in Virginia
- Bon Air (PAT station)
- Bon Air (Tampa), a neighborhood within the City of Tampa, Florida

== Outside the USA ==
- Bon Air Development, locality in Trinidad

== See also ==
- Bon Aire
- Bonaire
