= Liberian =

Liberian may refer to:

- Something of, from, or related to Liberia, a country on the west coast of Africa
- A person from Liberia, or of Liberian descent, see Demographics of Liberia
  - Americo-Liberians
- Liberian culture
- Liberian cuisine
- Liberian English

== See also ==
- List of Liberians
- Languages of Liberia
