= Honduran =

Honduran may refer to:

- Something of, from, or related to Honduras
- Hondurans, persons from Honduras or of Honduran descent
- Honduran population, see Ethnicity in Honduras
- Honduran Spanish, the language spoken in Honduras
- Honduran cuisine
- Honduran culture, see Culture of Honduras

== See also ==
- List of Hondurans
