= Corianino =

Curazia of Faetano, San Marino

- Curazia
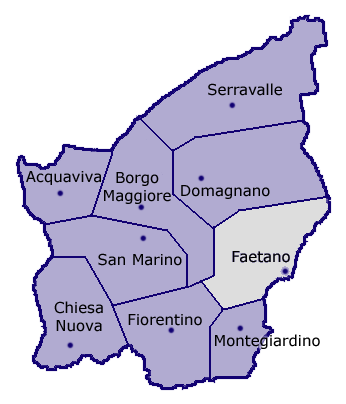
- Location of Faetano within San Marino

- Location within San Marino
- Coordinates: 43°55′57.6″N 12°28′56.4″E
- Country: San Marino
- Castello: Faetano
- Elevation: 350 m (1,150 ft)
- Demonym: corianinici
- Time zone: UTC+1 (CET)
  - Summer (DST): UTC+2 (CEST)
- Postal code: 47896
- Area code: +378 (0549)

Corianino is a curazia of San Marino, in the castello of Faetano.

== Geography ==
Corianino is located in the middle of its castle, on the road between Faetano and Borgo Maggiore.
