= Aruban =

Aruban may refer to:

- Something of, or related to Aruba
- A person from Aruba, the people of Aruba or someone of Aruban descent; see demographics of Aruba
- A dialect of Papiamento
- Aruban culture
- Arubans in the diaspora; see Arubans in the Netherlands and Arubans in the United States

== See also ==
- List of Arubans
- Languages of Aruba
