= Micronesian nationality law =

The nationality law of the Federated States of Micronesia determines who is or may become a citizen or national of the Federated States of Micronesia (FSM). Article III of the Constitution of the Federated States of Micronesia provides the basis for nationality law, while specific provisions are elaborated in 7 FSMC § 201 et seq.

== History ==
=== Spanish colonial period (1525–1899) ===
The first reported sighting of an island near the Caroline Islands by Europeans occurred in 1522, when Gonzalo Gómez de Espinosa commanding the Trinidad, one of the ships in Magellan's fleet, spotted Sonsorol at the western edge of the Carolines. The first landfall in the Caroline Islands occurred between 1525 and 1527 when a ship under the command of Diogo da Rocha and piloted by Gomes de Sequeira encountered an island group and named it the Islas de Sequeira. (Note: Historian Andrew Sharp, notes that the time frame is unsure because various sources report that the expedition occurred in 1525, but that it was sent out by Jorge de Menezes who arrived to serve as the Portuguese Governor of the Moluccas in 1527.) The group of islands were east of the Philippines, between 9° and 10° North, and have been variously identified as the Ulithi atoll or the Yap atoll. After remaining for four months on one of the islands, the ship departed reporting that the islanders were a peaceful people, unaware of the world outside of their island. The islands nominally were claimed by Spain, assigned to the Captaincy General of the Philippines, resulting in the name Nuevas Filipinas being used for the island group until it was named Islas Carolinas after Charles II of Spain. Identification of the islands within the Caroline group continued to be made by Spanish and other European explorers through the next two centuries, but no European settlement occurred until missionaries were installed on Ulithi in the early eighteenth century. By the 1870s, fourteen churches and numerous schools had been established throughout the Carolines. European settlements, primarily established by traders, followed the missionaries to the territory.

Though claimed by Spain, the Caroline, Gilbert, and Marshall Islands remained mostly autonomous until 1874, when the Spanish attempted to reassert their authority there. That year, after forty years of conflict during the Carlist Wars, the Spanish empire began to restabilize. A new constitution was adopted in 1876, which was extended to the colonies. Under its terms, anyone born in Spanish territory was considered to be Spanish, but did not necessarily have the same rights as those persons born in Spain. From the early part of the 19th century, there were conflicts among European powers, who were establishing spheres of influence in the Pacific. In 1885, Germany annexed the Marshalls and attempted to take control of the Carolines. Spain retained control of the Carolines by granting Germany the right to trade and establish naval stations in the territory. To legitimize the agreement, a papal decree was obtained which confirmed Spanish sovereignty in the Caroline Islands, but established that Germany had a claim to the islands if Spain later decided to relinquish its authority.

The following year, Germany and Britain signed the Anglo-German Declarations about the Western Pacific Ocean to establish terms of their interaction and delineate the territories with which each was aligned. In 1889, the first Spanish Civil Code was adopted and extended to Puerto Rico, Panama, and the Captaincy General of the Philippines. The Code established that Spanish nationality was acquired either from birth in Spanish territory or by descent from a Spanish national. Legitimate children could derive nationality from a father, but only illegitimate children could derive Spanish nationality from a mother, as a married woman was required to take the nationality of her husband. It also contained provisions for foreigners to naturalize. The attempts to impose colonial rule upon the peoples of the Caroline Islands was met with resistance from the traditional chiefs. At the end of the Spanish–American War in 1898, Germany agreed to support the United States' claims to Guam and the Philippines in exchange for American support of Germany's claim to the Carolines. In 1899, Germany purchased the Carolines for 25 million Spanish pesetas, (around £1 million pounds sterling, and equivalent to GBP £111,000,000 in 2025 or US $151,000,000 in 2025, according to calculations based on retail price index measure of inflation).

=== German colonial period (1899–1920) ===
Upon acquiring the Carolines in 1899, administrators did not impose demands or control in the islands, allowing traditional chiefs to exercise their authority and avoiding actions that might create military conflict. Under the terms of the Colonial Act of 1888, German colonies were not part of the federal union, but they were also not considered foreign. Thus, laws that were extended to the colonies sometimes treated residents as nationals and other times as foreigners. Native subjects in the colonies were not considered to be German, but were allowed to naturalize. Naturalization required ten years residence in the territory and proof of self-employment. It was automatically bestowed upon all members of a family, meaning children and wives derived the nationality of the husband. The Nationality Law of 1913 changed the basis for acquiring German nationality from domicile to patrilineality, but did not alter derivative nationality. At the outbreak of World War I, Japan joined the Allies and began an offensive to capture the German possessions in the Pacific. By October 1914, Japanese troops had occupied the islands of Kosrae, Pohnpei, and Truk and during their occupation maintained the German administrative system. At the end of the war, under terms of the Treaty of Versailles, Japan was granted the South Seas Mandate in 1919, which included the Caroline, Mariana, Marshall, and Palau islands. Terms of the mandate specified that islanders were not to be militarized and that social and economic development in the territory was to be of benefit to the local inhabitants.

=== Japanese colonial period (1920–1947) ===
Between 1921 and 1922, administration for the Japanese Pacific colonies passed from the navy to civil authorities of the South Seas Bureau (Japanese: Nan'yō Chō). The native inhabitants of the islands were not equal to Japanese imperial subjects and were accorded different status. They were considered aliens, though if they met requirements of the 1899 Nationality Law, islanders could naturalize. It was doubtful that any Pacific Islander would qualify under the law which was designed to prevent foreigners from becoming Japanese nationals. Japanese nationality was based upon family identity and descent. Lacking specific lineage from a Japanese parent or extraordinary service to Japan, the interior minister denied almost every request for naturalization for fifty years after the 1899 law was passed. Under the system of family identity, when a woman married she was removed from her registered family (Japanese: koseki) and added to the registry of her husband's family. Provisions required that women who married foreigners lost their nationality and foreign women who married Japanese men gained nationality. In the case that a registered family had no male heirs, a foreign husband could be adopted (Japanese: mukoyōshi), deriving the nationality of his wife to carry on the family line.

Under Japan's colonial governance systems, law could be promulgated in Japan or in the colony. There was no uniform system of determining which law was applicable in different jurisdictions, but in general Orders of the Privy Council (Japanese: chokurei) enacted by the National Diet were not enforced by the South Seas Bureau. On the other hand, organic laws (Japanese: kansei) were written specifically to define the relationship between all institutions and the Colonial Office, as well as the local and national governments. The administrative ability of the colonial governor in the South Seas Bureau was highly regulated by the imperial government. Despite the League of Nations' mandate for Japan to treat the colonies as integral parts of the nation, Japan chose not to extend the constitution to their Pacific colonies. In the Caroline Islands, Japan maintained order through officially appointed village chieftains (Japanese: sonchō), who may or may not have been traditional leaders, undermining traditional authority systems. By 1935, the Japanese population in the Pacific exceeded the indigenous population of the islands, and much of the land had been bought from the native owners with the approval of the Japanese government.

By the mid-1930s the Japanese government abandoned the pretense of developing the Pacific islands for the benefit of the inhabitants and began building a series of fortifications in the region, planning for expansion in Southeast Asia. The substantial number of garrisons erected prolonged the conflicts during World War II (1939–1945), as the allied forces opted for a strategy of retaking island possessions rather than a direct strike on Japan. Raids in the Caroline Islands by the US forces began in 1944 with strikes in Pohnpei, Truk, and Yap, continuing until Japanese forces on Truk surrendered to the US Army on 2 September 1945. As each Pacific island was liberated, the United States installed a temporary military government. At the end of the war, the United States proposed retaining control over the former Japanese-mandated islands for security purposes. In 1947, a trust agreement was drawn with the United Nations and the United States to establish the Trust Territory of the Pacific Islands.

=== United States trust territory (1947–1979) ===
Upon taking control of the region in July 1947, the United States Navy decreed the removal of Japanese immigrants and began the process of repatriating Japanese civilians. The Trust Territory was managed by the navy until 1951, at which time administration was passed to the United States Department of the Interior. The following year, the Code of the Trust Territory was introduced. It defined nationals as persons born in the territory prior to 22 December 1952 who had not acquired other nationality, or those born after that date in the territory. It also confirmed that children born abroad to parents who were nationals of the Trust Territory derived their parents' nationality until the age of twenty-one. Foreigners over the age of eighteen were allowed to naturalize in the Trust Territories. Trust Territories nationals were not considered to be US nationals but were allowed to naturalize as would any other foreigner in the United States.

From 1969, the United States and representatives of the Trust Territory began negotiations to develop systems to terminate the trusteeship and provide pathways to independence. Because of the diversity of the districts of the territory, it was divided into four areas — Federated States of Micronesia, the Marshall Islands, the Northern Mariana Islands, and Palau — as it was deemed that a single set of documents would not adequately serve the political needs for the region. For Micronesia, negotiations granted islanders the right to self-determination, including control of their land, determining their own constitution, and terminating or retaining a relationship with the United States. By 1975, preliminary terms for a Free Association with the US had been drafted and a constitutional convention was convened to prepare a constitution. That year the Northern Marianas chose independence. They left the Trust Territory in 1978 and the remaining three districts determined they would seek separate, rather than united status.

=== Post-independence (1979–present) ===
A constitutional government was installed for the Federated States of Micronesia on 10 May 1979. Under the terms of the 1979 Citizenship and Naturalization Act, people who were considered nationals of the Trust Territory of the Pacific Islands and had a domicile in the territory became nationals of the Federated States of Micronesia on 10 May; (Note: Persons who were citizens of the Trust Territory and not residing in the territory of Micronesia could opt for nationality in the Federated States of Micronesia within six months of independence, per Article III, Sections 4 and 5 of the Constitution.) however, anyone who had dual nationality was required to renounce other citizenship within three years. Failure of renunciation, automatically bestowed Micronesian nationality after the three year period. (Note: CEDAW's Legislative Compliance Review in 2007 confirmed marriage does not legally impact nationality in Micronesia under the terms of the 1979 Constitution.) In 1982 the Federated States of Micronesia and the United States signed a Compact of Free Association, which established the relationship between the two nations, specifying the United States' responsibility to provide for the defense of the Marshall Islands and use of the territory for military purposes, as well as the islands' sovereignty over their territory. A plebiscite was held in 1983, wherein inhabitants in the Federated States of Micronesia accepted the compact, which would go into force, terminating the trustee relationship, in 1986.

== Current general provisions ==
After independence, citizenship of the Federated States of Micronesia is based on jus sanguinis. Article III, Section 2 of the Constitution provides that "a person born of parents one or both of whom are citizens of the Federated States of Micronesia is a citizen and national of the Federated States by birth".

== Dual citizenship ==
Article III, Section 3 of the Constitution, as well as 7 FSMC § 201, prohibit dual citizenship, stating that "A citizen of the Federated States of Micronesia who is recognized as a citizen of another nation shall, within 3 years of his 18th birthday, or within 3 years of the effective date of this Constitution, whichever is later, register his intent to remain a citizen of the Federated States and renounce his citizenship of another nation. If he fails to comply with this Section, he becomes a national of the Federated States of Micronesia."

In 2004, Public Law 13-65 proposed to repeal Article III, Section 3 of the constitution, which as President Joseph Urusemal described it, "eliminates the constitutional barrier to dual citizenship", but would not actually permit dual citizenship unless Congress passed legislation defining cases in which dual citizenship would be permitted. When put to a referendum during the 2005 elections, however, this amendment failed to garner the 75% support in the popular vote that it required in order to become effective.

== Naturalization ==
Naturalization is the conferral of FSM citizenship on an alien, or on an FSM national who is not a citizen. Naturalization procedures originally only applied to foreigners, but in 2008, Public Law 15-27 created procedures for FSM nationals to become FSM citizens as well, if they renounced the citizenship of other countries and followed certain other procedures. Naturalization is provided for in 7 FSMC § 204. Under regulations, naturalization requires a language assessment to confirm that the applicant has "an ability to read, write, and speak in words in ordinary usage" in the language of the state where he or she resides. Naturalization may be cancelled pursuant to § 205. Furthermore, under § 208, "any person who obtains naturalization through concealment of a material fact or willful misrepresentation in applying for naturalization, upon conviction thereof, shall be imprisoned for a period of not more than two years, or fined not more than $10,000, or both."

Naturalization is quite difficult to obtain. By 1994, very few foreigners had been granted citizenship. 7 FSMC § 204 requires "Congress' recommendation by bill" prior to the President naturalizing a person as a citizen of the Federated States of Micronesia. According to the United States' Country Reports on Human Rights Practices, Congress exercised this power for the first time only in 1998, and continues to exercise it only on rare occasions. In 2013, Sei Francis Uemoto, the Pohnpei-born son of a Japanese immigrant father and Pohnpeian mother, who had lived in Japan until 1983 and since then in Pohnpei, became the first FSM national to be naturalized as an FSM citizen under the new procedures since 2008.

== Loss of citizenship ==
7 FSMC § 206 names five grounds for loss of FSM citizenship. The first of these is "voluntarily obtain[ing] naturalization in a foreign state upon one's application". Though thousands of FSM citizens move to the United States under the Compact of Free Association, according to a U.S. Government Accountability Office report, few migrants from countries with Compacts of Free Association with the United States take action to become U.S. citizens, as an example citing data from the former Immigration and Naturalization Service that only 7 FSM citizens naturalized as U.S. citizens in 1998. (FSM citizens must still qualify for U.S. permanent residence through normal procedures in order to qualify for naturalization, and the CFA does not offer them special privileges in this regard.)

The remaining four grounds for loss of FSM citizenship are:

1. voluntarily taking an oath or making an affirmation or other formal declaration of allegiance to a foreign state or political subdivision thereof;
2. voluntarily entering, or serving in, the armed forces of a foreign state, with certain exceptions for service in the United States Armed Forces
3. voting in a political election in a foreign state where a prerequisite to such a vote is citizenship of that foreign state; or
4. if over 18 years of age, voluntarily making a formal renunciation of FSM citizenship.

Additionally, 7 FSMC § 204 provides that a dual citizen who does not "register his intent to remain a citizen of the Federated States and renounce his citizenship of another nation" becomes a national rather than a citizen.

== See also ==
- Compact of Free Association
- Micronesian passport
