= Congolese music =

Congolese music can refer to:

- Music of the Republic of the Congo (Congo-Brazzaville)
- Music of the Democratic Republic of the Congo (Zaire, Congo-Kinshasa)
