= Monacan =

Monacan may refer to:

- Monacan people, a Native American tribe recognized by the state of Virginia
- Monacan High School, a high school in Virginia
