= Jamaican =

Jamaican may refer to:

- Something or someone of, from, or related to the country of Jamaica
- Jamaicans, people from Jamaica
- Jamaican English, a variety of English spoken in Jamaica
- Jamaican Patois, an English-based creole language
- Culture of Jamaica
- Jamaican cuisine

== See also ==
- Demographics of Jamaica
- List of Jamaicans
- Languages of Jamaica
