= Moroccan =

Moroccan may refer to:

- Something or someone from, or related to the country of Morocco
  - Moroccans, or Moroccan people
  - Moroccan Arabic, spoken in Morocco
  - Moroccan Jews

== See also ==
- Morocco leather
