= Sammarinese =

People of the country of San Marino

Sammarinesi
- Flag of San Marino

Total population
- ~47,000; San Marino: 33,562; Abroad: ~13,000

Regions with significant populations
- San Marino: 33,562
- Italy: 6,584
- United States: 3,371
- Argentina: 2,172
- France: 2,083
- Brazil: 15
- Australia: 10 (by birth)

Languages
- Italian and Romagnol

Religion
- Christianity (Catholic Church)

Related ethnic groups
- Italians

Sammarinese (/səˌmærɪˈniːz/) are citizens and people of the Republic of San Marino.

== Language ==
San Marino recognizes Italian as the official language. The indigenous Sammarinese language is a variety of Romagnol spoken by approximately 83% of the population.

== Religion ==
Although historically San Marino fought against the political control of the Holy See, most Sammarinese people are Catholic, but there is no state religion. Many of San Marino's official ceremonies are held in the Basilica di San Marino, the republic's main church. There are a total of nine Catholic parishes all of which comprise the Diocese of San Marino-Montefeltro.
