= Demographics of Martinique =

This is a list of the demographics of Martinique, a Caribbean island and an overseas department/region and single territorial collectivity of France.

Census population and average annual growth rate
Year	Pop.	±%
1961	290,679	—
1967	320,030	+10.1%
1974	324,832	+1.5%
1982	328,556	+1.1%
1990	359,572	+9.4%
1999	381,325	+6.0%
2009	396,404	+4.0%

== Population ==
According to INSEE Martinique has an estimated population of 390,371 on 1 January 2012. Life expectancy at birth is 78.9 years for males and 84.8 for females (figures for 2011).

=== Structure of the population ===
Population Estimates by Sex and Age Group (01.I.2010)(Provisional):

Age group	Male	Female	Total	%
Total	182 644	213 664	396 308	100
0-4	12 113	11 573	23 686	5.98
5-9	13 174	13 236	26 410	6.66
10-14	14 074	13 562	27 636	6.97
15-19	14 763	14 658	29 421	7.42
20-24	11 099	11 488	22 587	5.70
25-29	7 989	10 199	18 188	4.59
30-34	8 326	11 584	19 910	5.02
35-39	11 585	15 995	27 580	6.96
40-44	14 036	18 055	32 091	8.10
45-49	15 044	18 076	33 120	8.36
50-54	13 186	15 504	28 690	7.24
55-59	11 376	13 554	24 930	6.29
60-64	10 057	11 596	21 653	5.46
65-69	7 816	9 145	16 961	4.28
70-74	7 038	8 377	15 415	3.89
75-79	4 898	6 525	11 423	2.88
80-84	3 461	5 003	8 464	2.14
85-89	1 785	3 308	5 093	1.29
90-94	593	1 532	2 125	0.54
95+	231	694	925	0.23
Age group	Male	Female	Total	Percent
0-14	39 361	38 371	77 732	19.61
15-64	117 461	140 709	258 170	65.14
65+	25 822	34 584	60 406	15.24

Population by Sex and Age Group (Census 01.I.2015):

Age group	Male	Female	Total	%
Total	176 328	204 549	380 877	100
0–4	9 968	9 545	19 514	5.12
5–9	11 841	11 338	23 179	6.09
10–14	12 616	12 229	24 846	6.52
15–19	12 913	12 152	25 065	6.58
20–24	9 758	9 157	18 914	4.97
25–29	8 092	9 886	17 978	4.72
30–34	7 651	10 233	17 884	4.70
35–39	8 508	11 474	19 983	5.25
40–44	11 391	14 984	26 375	6.92
45–49	13 979	17 073	31 052	8.15
50–54	14 886	17 891	32 777	8.61
55–59	13 462	15 101	28 564	7.50
60–64	11 229	13 609	24 838	6.52
65-69	9 408	11 084	20 492	5.38
70-74	7 148	8 638	15 786	4.14
75-79	6 019	7 582	13 601	3.57
80-84	4 090	5 710	9 800	2.57
85-89	2 174	3 836	6 010	1.58
90-94	895	2 067	2 962	0.78
95-99	241	731	971	0.25
100+	59	228	287	0.08
Age group	Male	Female	Total	Percent
0–14	34 425	33 112	67 537	17.73
15–64	111 869	131 561	243 430	63.91
65+	30 034	39 876	69 910	18.36

Population Estimates by Sex and Age Group (01.I.2021):

Age group	Male	Female	Total	%
Total	162 310	193 719	356 029	100
0–4	8 196	7 868	16 064	4.51
5–9	8 896	9 008	17 904	5.03
10–14	10 595	10 353	20 948	5.88
15–19	10 819	10 682	21 501	6.04
20–24	8 965	8 519	17 484	4.91
25–29	6 985	8 407	15 392	4.32
30–34	7 420	9 856	17 276	4.85
35–39	7 381	10 175	17 556	4.93
40–44	7 153	10 212	17 365	4.88
45–49	10 044	13 700	23 744	6.67
50–54	12 864	16 287	29 151	8.19
55–59	14 470	17 451	31 921	8.97
60–64	13 510	15 187	28 697	8.06
65-69	11 067	13 016	24 083	6.76
70-74	8 892	10 594	19 486	5.47
75-79	6 193	7 905	14 098	3.96
80-84	4 612	6 607	11 219	3.15
85-89	2 789	4 366	7 155	2.01
90-94	1 107	2 355	3 462	0.97
95-99	327	897	1 224	0.34
100-104	25	197	222	0.06
105-109	0	73	73	0.02
110+	0	4	4	<0.01
Age group	Male	Female	Total	Percent
0–14	27 687	27 229	54 916	15.42
15–64	99 611	120 476	220 087	61.82
65+	35 012	46 014	81 026	22.76

== Vital statistics ==
Year	Population (x1000) (01.01)	Live births	Deaths	Natural change	Crude birth rate (per 1000)	Crude death rate (per 1000)	Natural change (per 1000)	Total fertility rate
1950	222	8 420	2 987	5 433	37.3	13.7	23.7	
1951	224	8 750	3 356	5 394	38.8	14.2	24.6	
1952	228	8 712	3 193	5 519	38.3	14.3	24.0	
1953	233	9 409	2 455	6 954	39.6	11.6	27.9	
1954	239	9 558	2 499	7 059	39.4	11.0	28.5	
1955	246	9 770	2 660	7 110	39.8	11.2	28.6	
1956	253	10 146	2 529	7 617	39.8	10.0	29.8	
1957	260	10 502	2 533	7 969	39.1	10.6	28.5	
1958	267	10 295	2 754	7 541	38.4	9.9	28.4	
1959	274	10 435	2 347	8 088	37.5	8.7	28.8	
1960	282	10 661	2 678	7 983	38.4	9.7	28.7	
1961	288	10 573	2 289	8 284	36.5	8.2	28.3	
1962	295	10 663	2 546	8 117	37.3	8.5	28.8	
1963	301	10 217	2 514	7 703	35.4	8.3	27.1	
1964	306	10 337	2 523	7 814	34.4	8.1	26.4	
1965	311	10 747	2 389	8 358	34.8	8.1	26.8	
1966	315	10 094	2 435	7 659	33.7	7.9	25.7	
1967	319	9 877	2 377	7 500	31.7	7.9	23.8	
1968	321	9 848	2 290	7 558	31.9	7.6	24.3	
1969	323	8 893	2 493	6 400	29.0	7.7	21.3	
1970	325	9 275	2 559	6 716	28.9	7.8	21.1	
1971	326	9 214	2 230	6 984	29.7	7.0	22.6	
1972	327	8 657	2 280	6 377	28.4	7.3	21.2	
1973	328	7 683	2 382	5 301	26.3	7.4	18.9	
1974	328	7 317	2 427	4 890	24.6	7.4	17.2	
1975	328	6 741	2 300	4 441	22.9	7.1	15.8	
1976	327	5 873	2 344	3 529	19.5	7.2	12.3	
1977	326	5 409	2 173	3 236	17.9	6.8	11.1	
1978	325	5 065	2 188	2 877	16.4	6.7	9.7	
1979	325	5 439	2 120	3 319	17.2	6.5	10.7	
1980	325	5 363	2 164	3 199	18.1	6.6	11.5	
1981	327	5 406	2 041	3 365	18.2	6.4	11.8	
1982	329	5 376	2 113	3 263	18.2	6.4	11.8	
1983	333	5 641	2 207	3 434	18.5	6.6	11.9	
1984	336	5 712	2 072	3 640	18.3	6.4	11.9	
1985	340	5 711	2 132	3 579	18.2	6.5	11.7	
1986	344	5 969	2 112	3 857	17.7	6.2	11.5	
1987	348	6 328	2 149	4 179	18.6	6.2	12.4	
1988	352	6 386	2 092	4 294	18.7	6.0	12.7	
1989	355	6 565	2 162	4 403	19.3	6.1	13.2	
1990	358.406	6 437	2 228	4 209	18.0	6.2	11.7	
1991	359.774	6 316	2 181	4 135	17.5	6.0	11.5	
1992	361.420	6 315	2 182	4 133	17.4	6.0	11.4	
1993	363.344	5 901	2 226	3 675	16.2	6.1	10.1	
1994	365.554	5 698	2 216	3 482	15.5	6.0	9.5	
1995	368.045	5 644	2 338	3 306	15.3	6.3	9.0	
1996	370.818	5 669	2 290	3 379	15.3	6.2	9.1	
1997	373.873	5 735	2 403	3 332	15.3	6.4	8.9	
1998	377.221	5 793	2 530	3 263	15.3	6.7	8.6	1.90
1999	380.863	5 766	2 551	3 215	15.1	6.7	8.4	1.91
2000	383.575	5 890	2 639	3 251	15.3	6.9	8.5	2.00
2001	386.542	5 774	2 734	3 040	14.9	7.1	7.9	1.98
2002	389.302	5 446	2 649	2 797	14.0	6.8	7.2	1.89
2003	391.676	5 430	2 727	2 703	13.8	7.0	6.9	1.92
2004	393.852	5 255	2 645	2 610	13.3	6.7	6.6	1.91
2005	395.982	5 032	2 610	2 422	12.7	6.6	6.1	1.86
2006	397.732	5 370	2 663	2 707	13.5	6.7	6.8	2.04
2007	397.730	5 317	2 830	2 487	13.3	7.1	6.2	2.05
2008	397.693	5 333	2 793	2 540	13.4	7.0	6.4	2.10
2009	396.404	5 174	2 771	2 403	12.9	6.9	6.0	2.07
2010	394.173	4 888	2 843	2 045	12.4	7.2	5.2	2.02
2011	392.291	4 475	2 741	1 734	11.5	7.0	4.5	1.91
2012	388.364	4 458	2 816	1 642	11.5	7.3	4.2	1.99
2013	385.551	4 128	2 902	1 226	10.7	7.5	3.2	1.91
2014	383.911	4 367	3 319	1 048	11.4	8.7	2.7	2.08
2015	380.877	3 972	3 057	915	10.5	8.1	2.4	1.94
2016	376.480	3 782	3 284	498	10.0	8.7	1.3	1.90
2017	372.594	3 640	3 217	423	9.8	8.7	1.1	1.87
2018	368.783	3 670	3 292	378	10.0	9.0	1.0	1.90
2019	364.508	3 749	3 559	190	10.3	9.8	0.5	1.97
2020	361.225	3 529	3 586	–57	9.8	9.9	–0.1	1.85
2021	360.749	3 627	4 642	–1 015	10.1	12.9	–2.8	1.89
2022	361.019	3 493	4 188	–695	9.7	11.6	–1.9	1.85
2023	359.202	3 335	3 820	–485	9.3	10.6	–1.3	1.79
2024	357.590	2 898	3 793	–895	8.1	10.5	–2.4	1.52
2025	355.459	2 921	3 732	-811	8.1	10.6	–2.5	

== Ethnic groups ==
African Martinicans and African-White-Indian mixture 80%; Indo-Martinicans 10%; White Martinicans 5%; Lebanese, Jewish, Syrian, and Chinese Martinicans comprise less than 5% of the population. Note that French government forbids ethnic censuses. Those numbers are not official and may be inaccurate.

== Languages ==
French is the official language and is understood by the majority of the population. Martinican Creole, a form of Antillean Creole, is also spoken by most of the population.

== Religion ==
Martinique's population is predominantly Christian, with 96.5% of Martinicans identifying as such. A much smaller number of Martinicans identify as unaffiliated with any religion, accounting for 2.3% of the population. Hinduism, Judaism, and Islam all have a presence on the island, each accounting for less than 1% of the population. Muslims account for 0.5% or 1751 person, out of population of 350,373.

== See also ==
- Demographics of France
