= Demographics of Montserrat =

The demographics of the population of Montserrat include population density, ethnicity, education level, health of the populace, economic status, religious affiliations and other aspects of the population.

Census population and average annual growth rate
Year	Pop.	±% p.a.
1901	12,215	—
1911	12,196	−0.02%
1921	12,120	−0.06%
1946	13,313	+0.38%
1960	13,378	+0.03%
1970	12,155	−0.95%
1980	11,685	−0.39%
1991	11,314	−0.29%
2001	4,491	−8.83%
2010	4,922	+1.02%
2014	5,100	+0.89%
2016	5,146	+0.45%

== Population ==
Montserrat had a population of 7,119 in 1842.

In 1995, the Soufriere Hills Volcano eruption caused two-thirds of the population of about 11,500 people to evacuate the island. According to the 2001 census only 4,491 people were resident of Montserrat. The total local-born population was 69% while those born abroad were 31%. According to The 2012 Revision of the World Population Prospects' medium fertility scenario, the anticipated mid-year population for 2014 is 5,100.
note: Approximately two thirds of the population left the island following the resumption of volcanic activity in July 1995. According to the 2001 UK Census 7,983 Montserratian-born people were residing in the UK (almost twice the population of Montserrat itself).

=== Structure of the population ===
Population by Sex and Age Group (Census 12.V.2011):

Age group	Male	Female	Total	%
Total	2 546	2 376	4 922	100
0–4	157	144	301	6.12
5–9	146	165	311	6.32
10–14	187	172	359	7.29
15–19	179	140	319	6.48
20–24	404	365	269	5.47
25–29	154	145	299	6.07
30–34	138	160	298	6.05
35–39	172	196	368	7.48
40–44	189	217	406	8.25
45–49	196	185	381	7.74
50–54	183	148	331	6.72
55–59	181	133	314	6.38
60–64	165	110	275	5.59
65–69	130	101	231	4.69
70–74	75	70	145	2.95
75–79	61	55	116	2.36
80–84	44	50	94	1.91
85+	37	68	105	2.13
Age group	Male	Female	Total	Percent
0–14	490	481	971	19.73
15–64	1 709	1 551	3 260	66.23
65+	347	344	691	14.04

Population Estimates by Sex and Age Group (01.VII.2020):

Age group	Male	Female	Total	%
Total	2 284	2 342	4 626	100
0–4	112	132	244	5.27
5–9	109	123	232	5.02
10–14	162	159	321	6.94
15–19	125	135	260	5.62
20–24	124	114	238	5.14
25–29	167	134	301	6.51
30–34	138	183	321	6.94
35–39	123	166	289	6.25
40–44	150	167	317	6.85
45–49	156	172	328	7.09
50–54	182	185	367	7.93
55–59	171	143	314	6.79
60–64	154	134	288	6.23
65–69	148	130	278	6.01
70–74	121	92	213	4.60
75–79	77	70	147	3.18
80–84	34	48	82	1.77
85–89	21	23	44	0.95
90+	10	32	42	0.91
Age group	Male	Female	Total	Percent
0–14	383	414	797	17.23
15–64	1 490	1 533	3 023	65.35
65+	411	395	806	17.42

== Vital statistics ==
	Average population (x 1000)	Live births	Deaths	Natural change	Crude birth rate (per 1000)	Crude death rate (per 1000)	Natural change (per 1000)	TFR
1950	13.5	406	197	209	30.0	14.6	15.5	
1951	14.1	436	177	259	30.9	12.5	18.3	
1952	14.5	423	148	275	29.2	10.2	19.0	
1953	14.6	424	203	221	29.0	13.9	15.1	
1954	14.6	429	180	249	29.5	12.4	17.1	
1955	14.3	428	173	255	29.9	12.1	17.8	
1956	13.9	396	166	230	28.5	11.9	16.5	
1957	13.4	373	162	211	27.8	12.1	15.7	
1958	12.9	377	172	205	29.2	13.3	15.9	
1959	12.5	391	184	207	31.4	14.8	16.6	
1960	12.1	359	141	218	29.7	11.7	18.0	
1961	11.9	335	136	199	28.2	11.4	16.7	
1962	11.8	324	128	196	27.5	10.8	16.6	
1963	11.8	341	117	224	28.9	9.9	19.0	
1964	11.8	364	107	257	30.8	9.0	21.7	
1965	11.8	383	147	236	32.3	12.4	19.9	
1966	11.8	328	139	189	27.8	11.8	16.0	
1967	11.8	363	148	215	30.9	12.6	18.3	
1968	11.7	322	115	207	27.5	9.8	17.7	
1969	11.7	264	138	126	22.7	11.8	10.8	
1970	11.6	302	121	181	26.0	10.4	15.6	
1971	11.6	269	123	146	23.1	10.6	12.6	
1972	11.7	318	144	174	27.3	12.4	14.9	
1973	11.7	295	107	188	25.2	9.2	16.1	
1974	11.7	304	131	173	25.9	11.2	14.7	
1975	11.8	213	128	85	18.1	10.9	7.2	
1976	11.8	20	128	78	17.4	10.8	6.6	
1977	11.9	205	138	67	17.2	11.6	5.6	
1978	11.9	193	147	46	16.2	12.3	3.9	
1979	11.9	238	116	122	19.9	9.7	10.2	
1980	11.9	224	103	121	18.8	8.6	10.2	
1981	11.9	231	117	114	19.5	9.9	9.6	
1982	11.7	260	114	146	22.1	9.7	12.4	
1983	11.6	266	124	142	22.9	10.7	12.2	
1984	11.5	244	104	140	21.3	9.1	12.2	
1985	11.3	237	124	113	20.9	10.9	10.0	
1986	11.2	200	123	77	17.9	11.0	6.9	
1987	11.0							
1988	10.9							
1989	10.8							
1990	10.7							
1991	10.8							
1992	10.9							
1993	10.9							
1994	10.7	150			14.0			
1995	10.2	126			12.3			
1996	9.4	128			13.7			
1997	8.3	67			8.2			
1998	6.9	33			4.8			
1999	5.8	45	59	-14	7.8	10.2	-2.4	
2000	5.0	48	52	-4	9.6	10.4	-0.8	
2001	4.5	47	50	-3	10.4	11.1	-0.7	
2002	4.4	54	44	10	12.3	10.0	2.3	
2003	4.5	40	55	-15	8.9	12.3	-3.4	
2004	4.6	47	57	-10	10.1	12.4	-2.3	
2005	4.785	63	59	4	13.2	12.4	0.8	
2006	4.655	49	47	2	10.1	9.7	0.4	
2007	4.819	43	44	-1	8.8	9.1	-0.2	
2008	4.875	72	45	27	14.8	9.2	5.5	
2009	5.039	50	44	6	9.9	8.7	1.2	
2010	5.020	62	40	22	12.4	8.0	4.4	
2011	4.883	46	55	-9	9.4	11.3	-1.9	
2012	4.847	53	44	9	10.9	9.1	1.8	
2013	4.796	41	45	-4	8.5	9.4	-0.9	
2014	4.798	50	32	18	10.4	6.7	3.7	
2015	4.801	48	49	-1	10.0	10.2	-0.2	
2016	4.742	46	43	3	9.7	9.1	0.6	
2017	4.768	55	39	16	11.5	8.2	3.3	
2018	4.667	45	38	7	9.6	8.1	1.5	
2019	4.519	47	59	-12	10.4	13.1	-2.7	1.680
2020	4.626	50	39	11	10.8	8.4	2.4	1.703
2021	4.458	43	46	-3	9.6	10.3	-0.7	1.559
2022	4.433	35	58	-23	7.9	13.1	-5.2	1.300
2023	4.294	25	40	-15	5.8	9.3	-3.5	0.95
2024	4.399	28	51	-23	6.4	11.6	-5.2	1.07
2025	4.325	29	46	-17	6.7	10.6	-3.9	1.12

=== Life expectancy ===
Based on 2023 data:

- total: 75.9 years
- male: 76.8 years
- female: 75.0 years

Montserrat is the only country or dependency where the life expectancy for men is higher than for women. The difference is 1.8 years.

== Ethnic groups ==
Ethnic groups of Montserrat (2011)
Ethnic groups	percent
African/Black	88.4%
Mixed	3.7%
Hispanic/Spanish	3%
Caucasian/White	2.7%
East Indian/Indian	1.5%
Other	0.7%

The vast majority of the population of Montserrat are of African descent (92.4% at the 2001 census) or mixed (2.9%). There is also a European origin minority (3.0%; mostly descendants of Irish indentured servants or British colonists), East Indians (1.0%) groups. Out of 403 Amerindians at the 1980 census only 3 persons were left in 2001.

== Religion ==
Religions in Montserrat (2001)
Religions	percent
Anglican	21.8%
Methodist	17%
Pentecostal	14.1%
Roman Catholic	11.6%
Seventh-day Adventist	10.5%
Unspecified	10.8%
Other	6.5%
Church of God	3.7%
None	2.6%
Rastafarian	1.4%

== See also ==
- Montserrat
- Montserratian British
