= Nepa (village) =

Nepa नेपा
- Location in Nepal
- Coordinates: 28.86°N 81.56°E
- Country: Nepal
- Zone: Bheri Zone
- District: Dailekh District

Population (1991)
  - Total: 3,621
- Time zone: UTC+5:30 (Nepal Time)

Nepa is a village and market center Dullu Municipality in Dailekh District in the Bheri Zone of western-central Nepal. The formerly village development committee was annexed to the municipality from 18 May 2014. At the time of the 1991 Nepal census it had a population of 3621 people living in 739 individual households.
