= Religion in San Marino =

Religion in San Marino (2021)
1. Christianity (91.5%)
2. Agnosticism (5.60%)
3. Atheism (1.90%)
4. Other (1.00%)

San Marino is a small landlocked country with an area of about 61.2 km^{2} (23.6 sq mi) on a rocky promontory at an elevation of 657 meters (2,156 ft) in central Italy. In 2023, the population was 33,636. It is the third smallest country in Europe after Vatican City and Monaco. It is traditionally held to have been founded as a republic in 301 AD, was recognized by the Papacy in 1631, and became a member of the United Nations in 1992. As of 2009, the ethnic composition was about 84.95% Sammarinese, 14.6% Italians and others.

According to a 2021 report on religious freedom in the country, the population is 91.5% Christian, 5.6% agnostic, 1.9% atheist, and 1% 'other'.

The country does not provide exact statistics of the religious affiliations of its people. However, in the early 2000s, it was inferred that at least 95% of the people were Roman Catholics, as in Italy, but with a historical Jewish and Protestant minority.

Estimates in 2020 suggested that 85.45% of the population were Catholic, while 6% belonged to other Christian denominations, 1% were Baha'i and 7.56% had no religion; there were also approximately 10 Muslims in the country.

San Marino's schools are all public and must offer Catholic-based religious education; there are no private religious schools.

The oath of loyalty as prescribed in 1903 demanded that it is to be sworn on the "Holy Gospel". Those rules were changed in 1993 to give Parliamentarians the choice to replace the phrase of "Holy Gospel" to "on my honor". This legal "formulation" has been upheld by the European Court of Human Rights (ECHR). The traditional formulation was still mandatory in 2006 for other offices like that of the Captain regent and government minister.

San Marino religiosity
Catholicism	97%
Others	3%

== Christianity ==
=== Catholicism ===
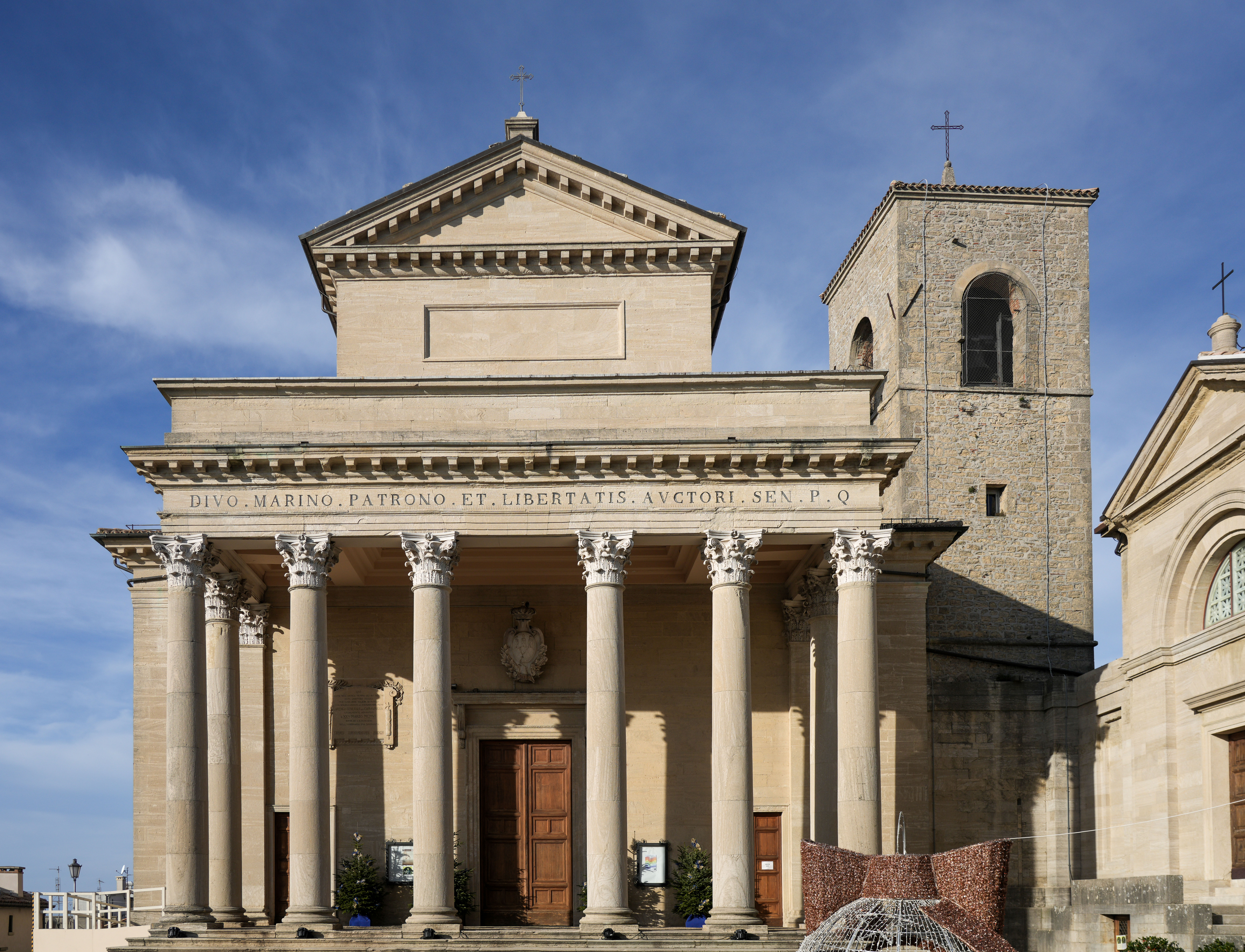
Basilica di San Marino, the main church of the capital city of San Marino.

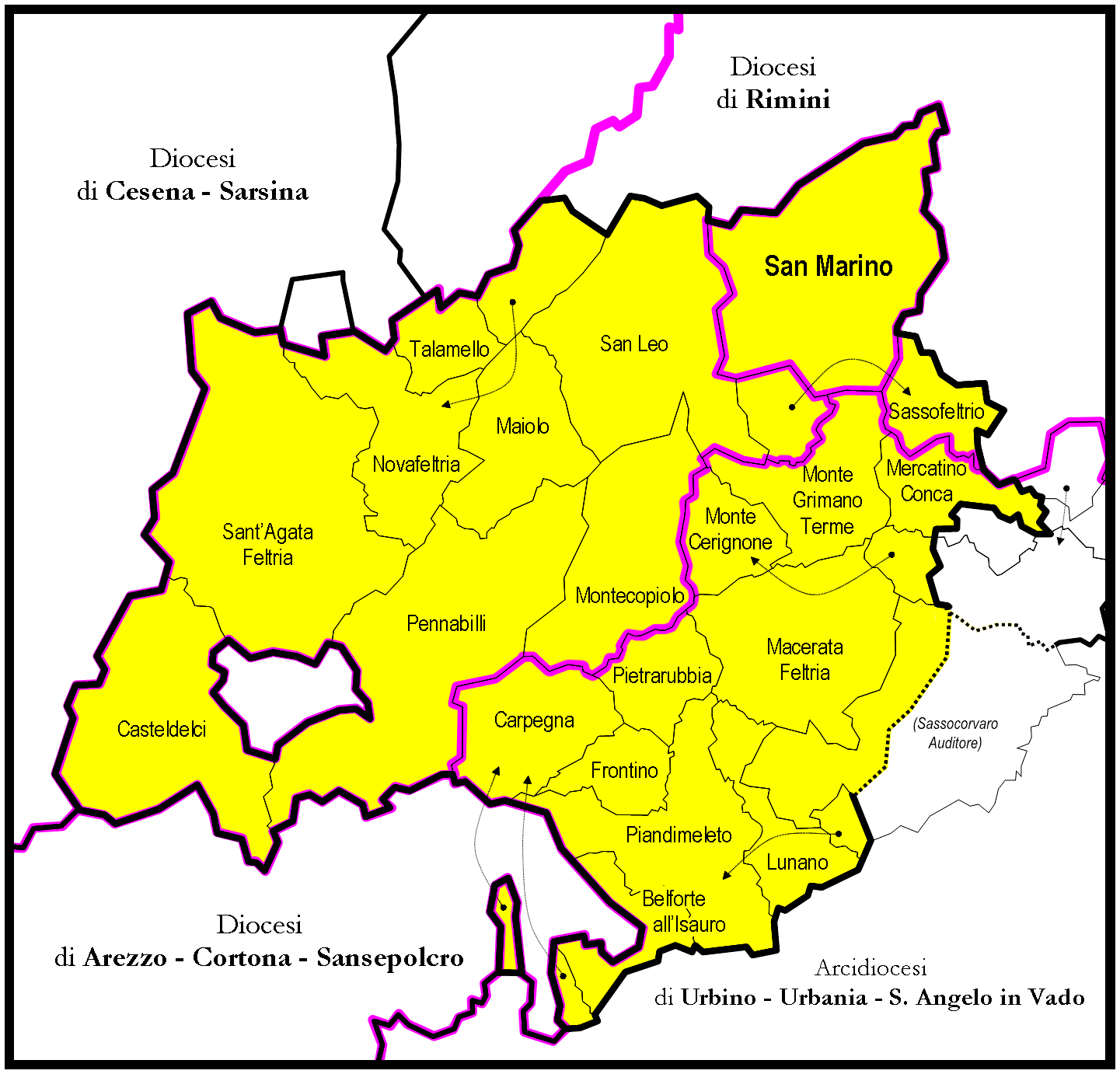
San Marino is part of the Diocese of San Marino-Montefeltro

San Marino is a predominantly Catholic state: over 97% of the population profess the Catholic faith, but Catholicism is not an established religion. Approximately half of those who profess to be Catholic practice the faith. There is no Episcopal see in San Marino. Historically, the various parishes in San Marino were divided between two Italian dioceses, mostly in the Diocese of Montefeltro, and partly in the Diocese of Rimini. In 1977, the border between Montefeltro and Rimini was readjusted so that all of San Marino fell within the diocese of Montefeltro. The bishop of San Marino-Montefeltro resides in Pennabilli, in Italy. However, there is a provision under the Income tax rules that the tax payers have the right to request the allocation of 0.3% of their income tax to the Catholic Church or to "other" charities. The Churches include the two religious groups of the Waldensians and Jehovah's Witnesses.

The Roman Catholic Diocese of San Marino-Montefeltro was until 1977 the historic diocese of Montefeltro. It is a suffragan of the archdiocese of Ravenna-Cervia. The current diocese includes all the parishes of San Marino. The earliest mention of Montefeltro, as Mona Feretri, is in the diplomas by which Charlemagne confirmed the donation of Pepin. The first known bishop of Montefeltro was Agatho (826), whose residence was at San Leo. Under Bishop Flaminios Dondi (1724) the see was again transferred to San Leo, but later it returned to Pennabilli. The historic diocese was a suffragan of the archdiocese of Urbino.

There are at least twelve parishes, and many Catholic religious organizations such as the Society of Our Lady of Consolation, the Society of St. Rosario nella Parrocchia di Fiorentino, the Our Lady of Mount Caramel Society, Institute of Our Religious Teachers, and the Guard of Honour of the Immaculate Heart of Mary. There are also several convents and monasteries such as the San Francesco convent of Friars, Convent of the Friars Minor Capuchin, Monastery Santa Maria dei Servi, and Monastery Santa Chiara.

==== Places of worship ====
San Marino, with the distinct domination of religious buildings of historic Christian faith, has several churches of note:

===== Basilica di San Marino =====
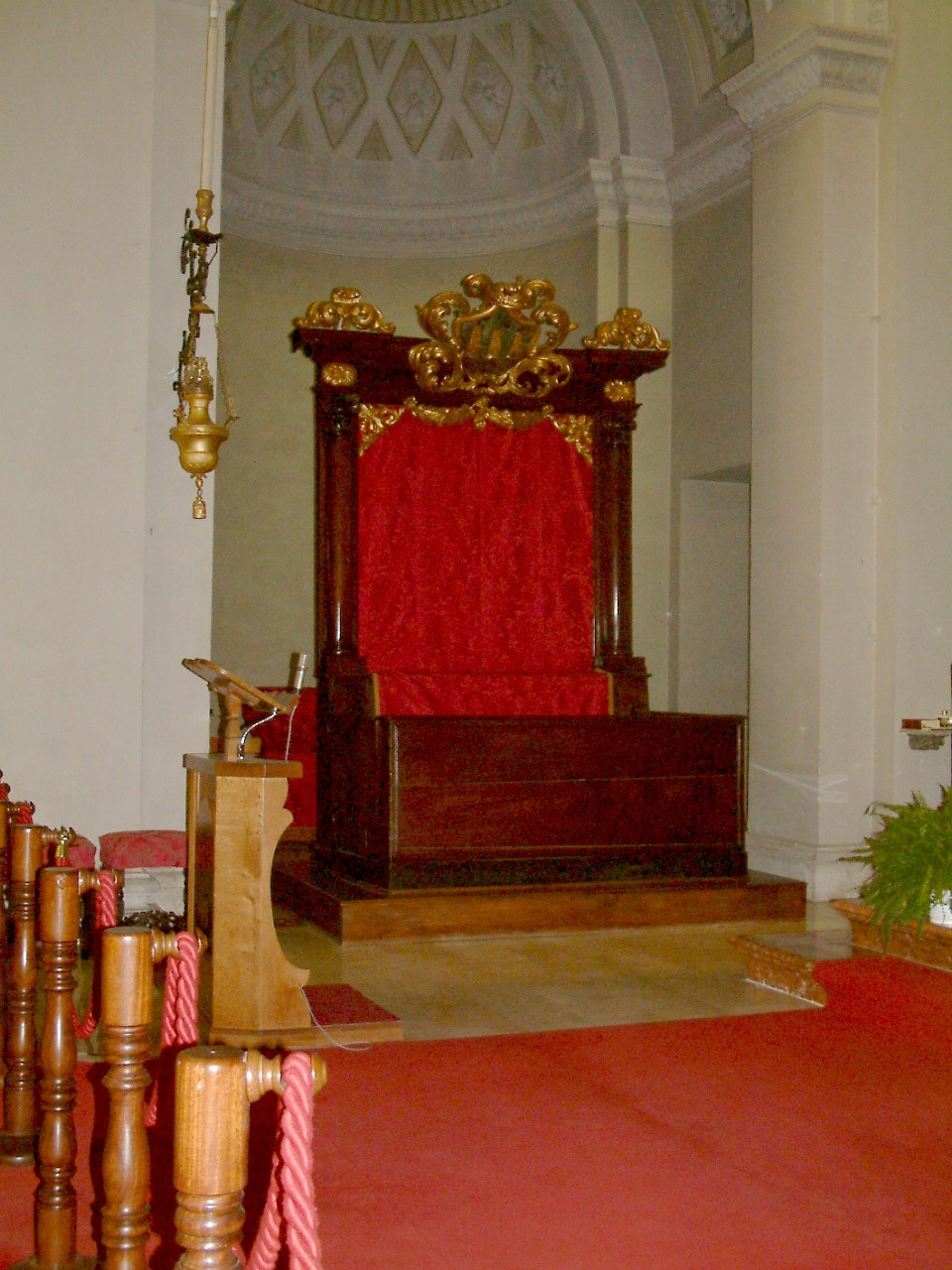
Throne of the Captain's-Regent inside the basilica

The Basilica di San Marino is the main church of the City of San Marino, located on the Piazza Domus Plebis. It is dedicated to the patron of the city (San Marino diacono) and the state of San Marino. The church is built in the neoclassical style, and has a porch of eight Corinthian columns. A church was originally erected on the spot in the fourth century, also dedicated to the same patron. The first document attesting the existence of a church (specifically, a monastery) in the area is the Placito Feretrano ostensibly dating from 885, although only known through an 11th-century copy. The first document that directly relates to the "Pieve di San Marino" is dated 31 July 1113.

At the beginning of the 1800s, the church was in critical condition, so in 1807 it was pulled down and the project for the construction of the new church was handed to the Bolognese Achille Serra. On July 24, 1825, the council decided to build a new church in the place where there was the old church. The construction began on 28 July 1826 and was completed in 1838. On February 5, 1838, the church was solemnly inaugurated in the presence of Bishop of Montefeltro, Crispino Agostinucci and the Captain's-Regent. On July 21, 1926, it was elevated to the rank of Basilica by Pius XI. The construction cost 40,150 scudi and 76 baiocchi.

The interior of the basilica consists of three naves, composed of sixteen Corinthian columns which form a large ambulatory around the semicircular apse. The altar is adorned by a statue of the San Marino deacon by the Adamo Tadolini, a student of Antonio Canova. Under the altar are relics of the Saint Marino (San Marino) which were found on March 3, 1586, and some relics on January 28, 1595, were donated to the island of Rab (Croatia), the birthplace of the saint. A reliquary bust in silver and gold dated to September 2, 1602, lies to the right of altar. In the right aisle is a small altar dedicated to the Mary Magdelene and a painting by Elisabetta Sirani "Noli Me Tangere."

On August 29, 1982, the basilica was visited by John Paul II, who blessed the church and the relics related to the deacon of San Marino. The Basilica of San Marino is depicted on the ten cent additions of the Sammarinese euro coins.

===== Chiesa di San Pietro =====
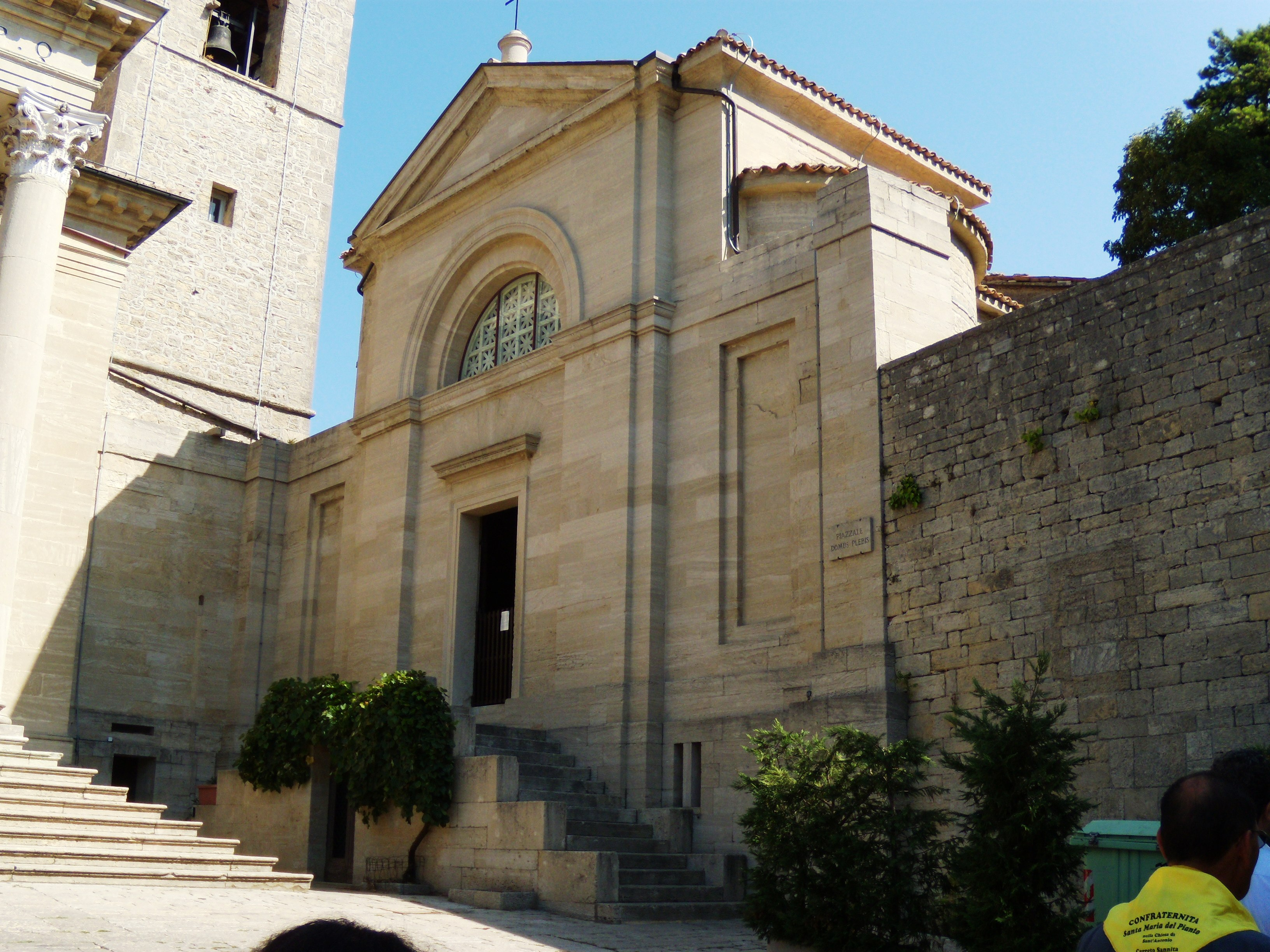
Chiesa di San Pietro

Chiesa di San Pietro, located at the Basilica of San Marino is a small church, which was originally built in 600. It houses a valuable altar with inlaid marble, donated by the musician Antonio Tedeschi in 1689, which is surmounted by a statue dedicated to St. Peter by Enrico Saroldi. In the crypt of this church there are two niches that traditionally were the beds of San Marino and San Leo. Inside is a monument to Pope John XXIII, erected by the Government of the Republic.

===== Chiesa di San Francesco =====
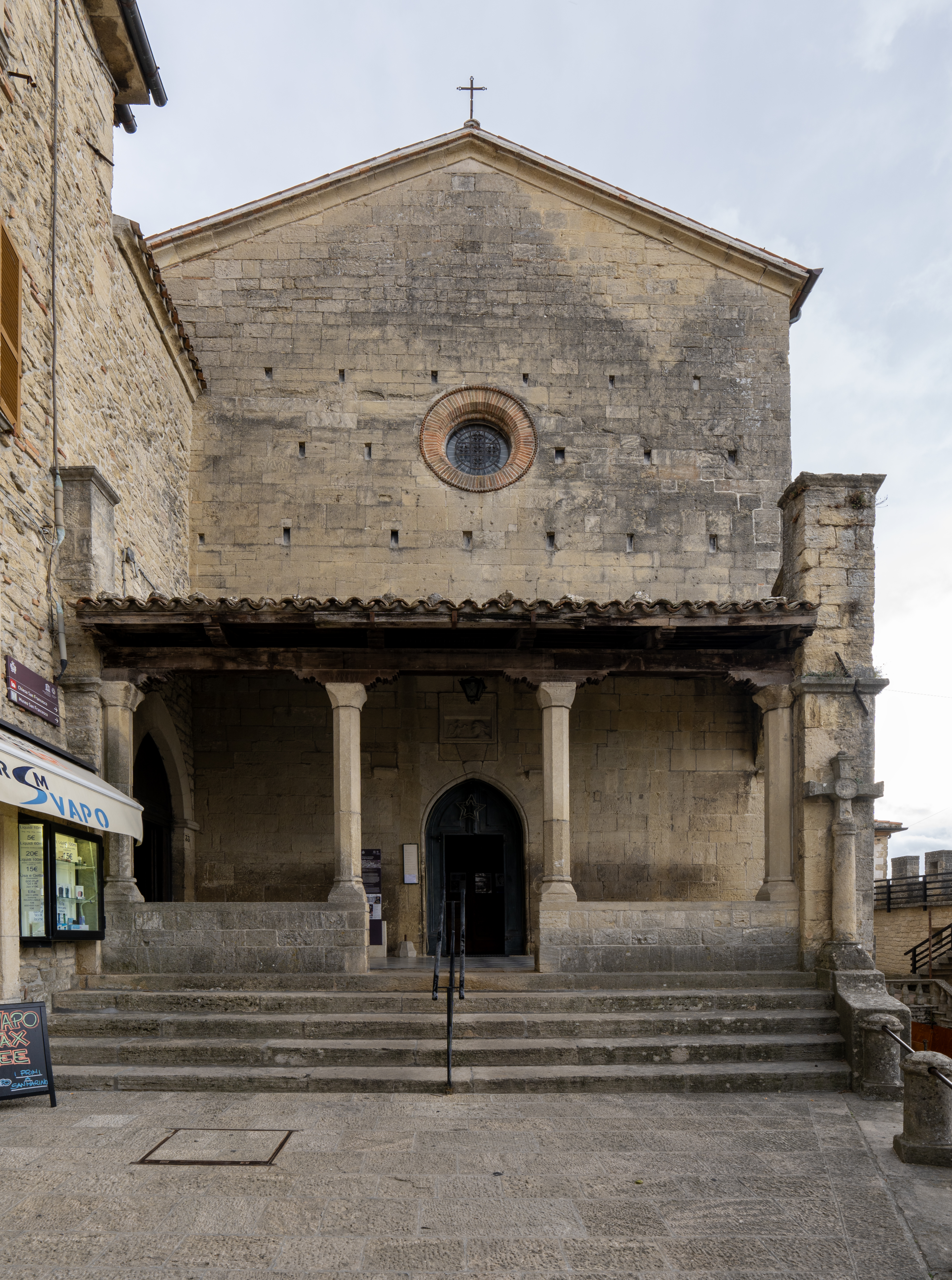
Chiesa di San Francesco

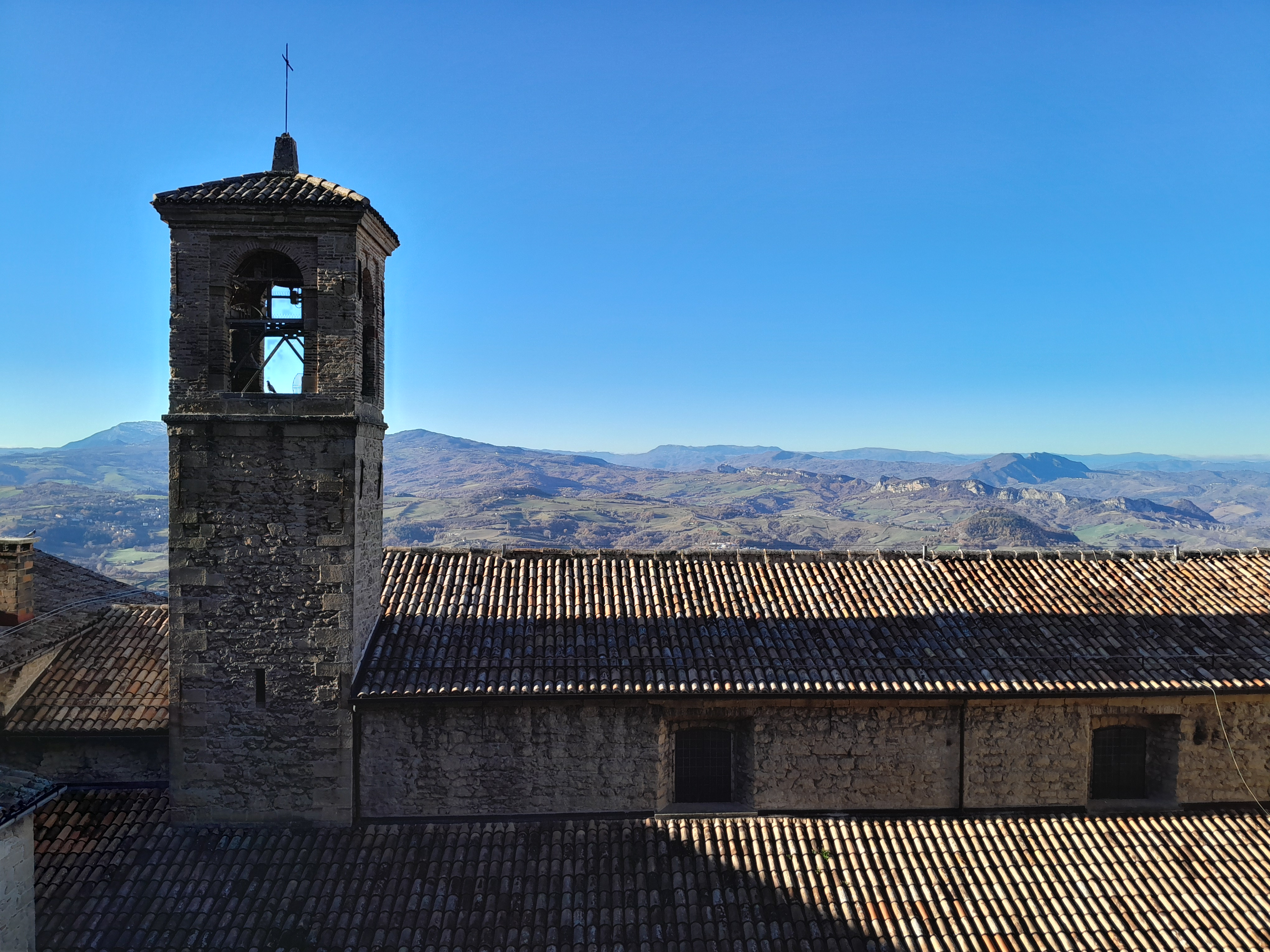
Chiesa di San Francesco

Chiesa di San Francesco, located in the City of San Marino, was originally built from 1361.

The adjoining convent and the church had originally based in Murata, but later Pope Clement VII granted the displacement of the church and convent in the City of San Marino.

Construction was started in 1361 and completed in 1400. It was built using the construction materials of the displaced church and convent. The rose window was covered in the seventeenth century but has been unearthed in the latest renovations undertaken by Gino Zani. In the cloister is the tomb of the bishop Marino Madroni, who lived in the fifteenth century. In the adjacent Museo San Francesco are preserved paintings of Guercino and Raphael.

===== Chiesa di San Paolo apostolo =====
Chiesa di San Paolo apostolo, located in the City of San Marino, was built between 1898 and 1916 and consecrated in 1917. The church was designed by the Capuchin friar Angelo Cassano. In 1950 Amedeo Botticelli di Camerano decorated it. There are two beautiful chapels and twentieth century carvings by Amedeo Filipucci.

===== Chiesa di Sant'Andrea =====
The Chiesa di Sant'Andrea, located in Acquaviva, is dedicated to St. Andrew the Apostle. It was built in the late Middle Ages on a spot where a previous church dated to the third century lay. The church underwent major renovations over the centuries, particularly in 1679, 1694 and 1933). Inside there are two major paintings, "Presentation of Jesus in the Temple" of the Bolognese school of 600 and St. Andrew the Apostle and San Crescentino from 1761.

===== Chiesa di Sant'Andrea =====
The Chiesa di Sant'Andrea, located in Serravalle, is dedicated to St Andrew and the Virgin Mary. It was built in 1824 on the ancient city walls and dedicated to the Virgin Mary. There is an ancient fresco in the apse dated to 400 and dedicated to the Virgin Mary. The church was completely finished in 1914 and was restored in 1973 under the direction of Luigi Fonti di Rimini.

===== Monastero di Santa Chiara =====
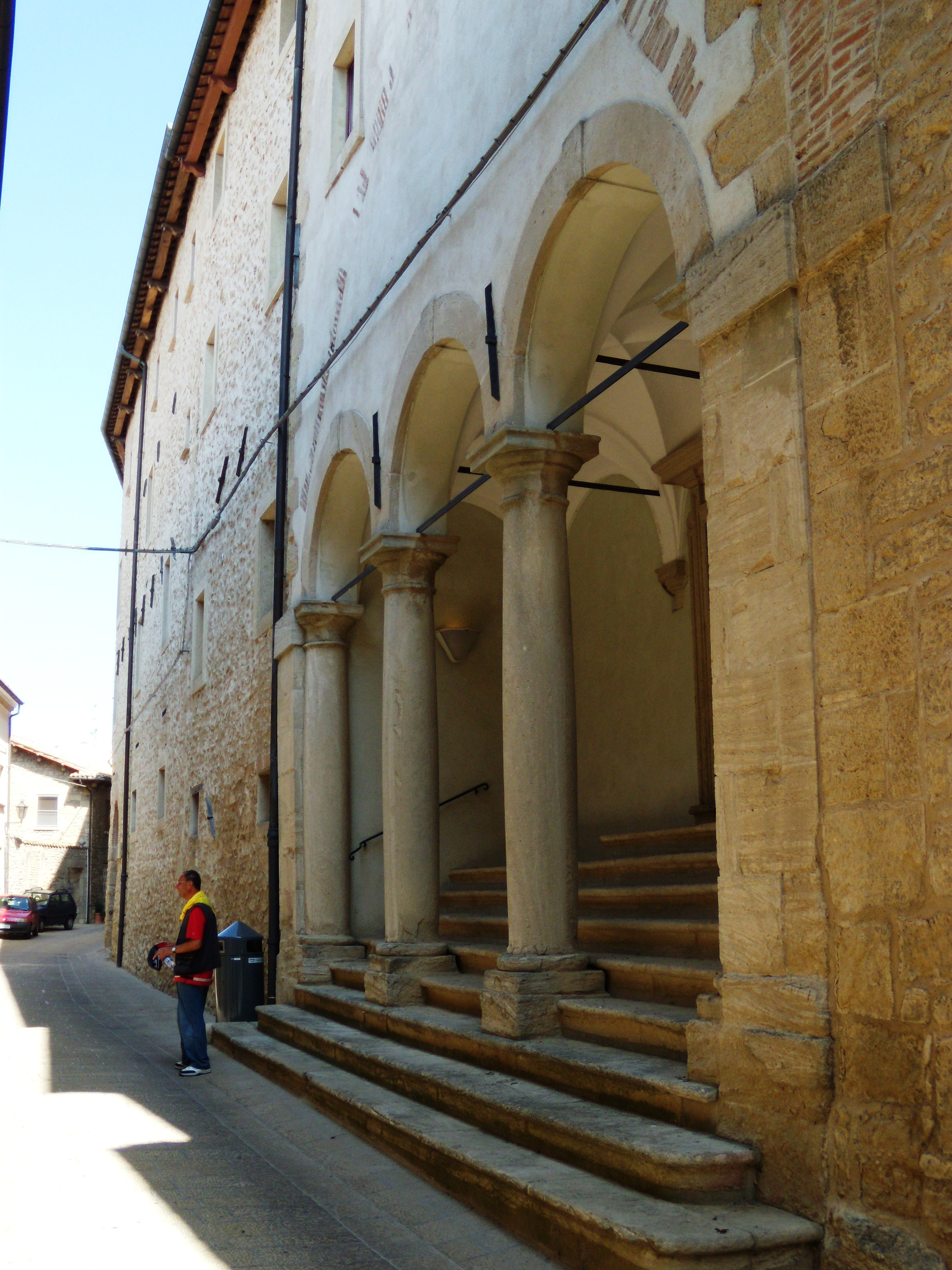
Santa Chiara

The Monastero di Santa Chiara is a modern monastery building, located in Valdragone, Borgo Maggiore. The construction of the monastery began in 1969 and was opened for worship two years later in 1971. It is home to 17 nuns and was moved from the City of San Marino from an old monastery building built in 1565, thanks the help of Bishop Costantino Bonelli, and the government and citizens of San Marino.

===== Oratorio di San Rocco =====
The Oratorio di San Rocco, located in Cailungo, was built after the plague in honor of San Rocco The interior has an oil on canvas painting of Madonna and Child and St. John the Baptist dated to 1594.

===== Santuario della Beata Vergine della Consolazione =====
The Santuario della Beata Vergine della Consolazione, also known as "the Church of Our Lady of Consolation", is a sanctuary, located in the village of Valdragone in Borgo Maggiore. It is governed by the Franciscan Order of Marche and Servi di Maria.

The place of worship was built by the Italian architect Giovanni Michelucci from February 1964, and its consecration took place on 11 June 1967. Michelucci was initially approached by the government of San Marino for a consultation about the transformation of a nursing home. The architect was then asked to draw up plans for the Shrine of Our Lady of Consolation, whose project was presented to the Assembly of the Congregation already in 1961. The sanctuary was built on the existing Romanesque church of Santa Maria, built around the start of the 16th century. It is the only sanctuary of the Republic of San Marino and especially welcomes pilgrims from Romagna and Marche.

=== Protestantism ===
A Protestant minority exists in San Marino; it largely belongs to the Waldensian Church.

== Judaism ==
There has been a Jewish presence in San Marino for at least 600 years.

The first mention of Jews in San Marino dates to the late 14th century, in official documents recording the business transactions of Jews. There are many documents throughout the 15th to 17th centuries describing Jewish dealings and verifying the presence of a Jewish community in San Marino. Jews were required to wear special badges and live by specific restrictions, but were also permitted official protection by the government.

During World War II, San Marino provided a harbor for more than 100,000 Italians and Jews (ten times the country's population at the time) from Nazi persecution. In the early 2000s, there were only small numbers of Jews in San Marino.

== Islam ==
Islam is a small minority religion in San Marino. A 2015 Italian media report estimated around 150 Muslim residents or converts living in the country, in addition to temporary workers and visitors who come for prayer.

The main Islamic organisation in the country is the association Al Nur (Arabic for "The Light"), also known as the Islamic Centre of San Marino. Founded in 2012 by Muslim women of Italian origin, it has been led by president Cristina Mercadini. The association maintains a prayer room in Gualdicciolo (Castello di Acquaviva), which has functioned as the only mosque in the Republic. It organises daily prayers, the Friday congregational prayer, and Arabic and Islamic education classes for children on weekends.

In 2016 the association faced temporary difficulties when its prayer space required bureaucratic adjustments to comply with regulations as a place of worship, leading it to seek alternative venues during Ramadan.
