= Sant'Andrea =

Sant'Andrea is the Italian name for St. Andrew, most commonly Andrew the Apostle. It may refer to:

== Communes in Italy ==
- Castronuovo di Sant'Andrea, Basilicata
- Cazzano Sant'Andrea, Lombardy
- Mazzarrà Sant'Andrea, Sicily
- Penna Sant'Andrea, Abruzzo
- Sant'Andrea di Conza, Campania
- Sant'Andrea Frius, South Sardinia
- Sant'Andrea del Garigliano, Frosinone
- Sant'Andrea Apostolo dello Ionio, Calabria
- Sant'Andrea di Suasa, Pesaro-Urbino

== Other Italian localities ==
- Sant'Andrea, frazione of Colle di Val d'Elsa
- Sant'Andrea dei Lagni, frazione of Santa Maria Capua Vetere
- Torre Sant'Andrea, part of the communal territory of Melendugno (province of Lecce)
- Sant'Andrea in Percussina, frazione of San Casciano Val di Pesa (province of Florence)

== Communes in France ==
- Sant'Andréa-d'Orcino
- Sant'Andrea-di Bozio
- Sant'Andrea-di-Cotone

== Islands ==
- Isola di Sant'Andrea
- Sant'Andrea (Venetian Lagoon)

== Churches ==
- Basilica di Sant'Andrea di Mantova, Mantua
- Basilica di Sant'Andrea (Vercelli)
- Carrara Cathedral (dedicated to St. Andrew)
- Chiesa di Sant'Andrea (Acquaviva), San Marino
- Chiesa di Sant'Andrea (Serravalle), San Marino
- Sant'Andrea della Valle, Rome
- Sant'Andrea in Via Flaminia, Rome
- Sant'Andrea della Zirada, Venice
- Pieve di Sant'Andrea (Cercina)
- Pieve di Sant'Andrea (Pistoia)

== See also ==
- St Andrew
