= Crispino Agostinucci =

Crispino Agostinucci may refer to:

- Crispino Agostinucci (bishop)
- Crispino Agostinucci (general)
