= Italian Renaissance domes =

Italian Renaissance domes were designed during the Italian Renaissance period of the fifteenth and sixteenth centuries. Beginning in Florence, the style spread to Rome and Venice and made the combination of dome, drum, and barrel vaults standard structural forms.

Notable architects during the Italian Renaissance were Filippo Brunelleschi, builder of the dome of Florence Cathedral, Donato Bramante, Andrea Palladio, and Michelangelo, designer of the dome of St. Peter's Basilica.

== Fifteenth century ==
=== Florence Cathedral ===
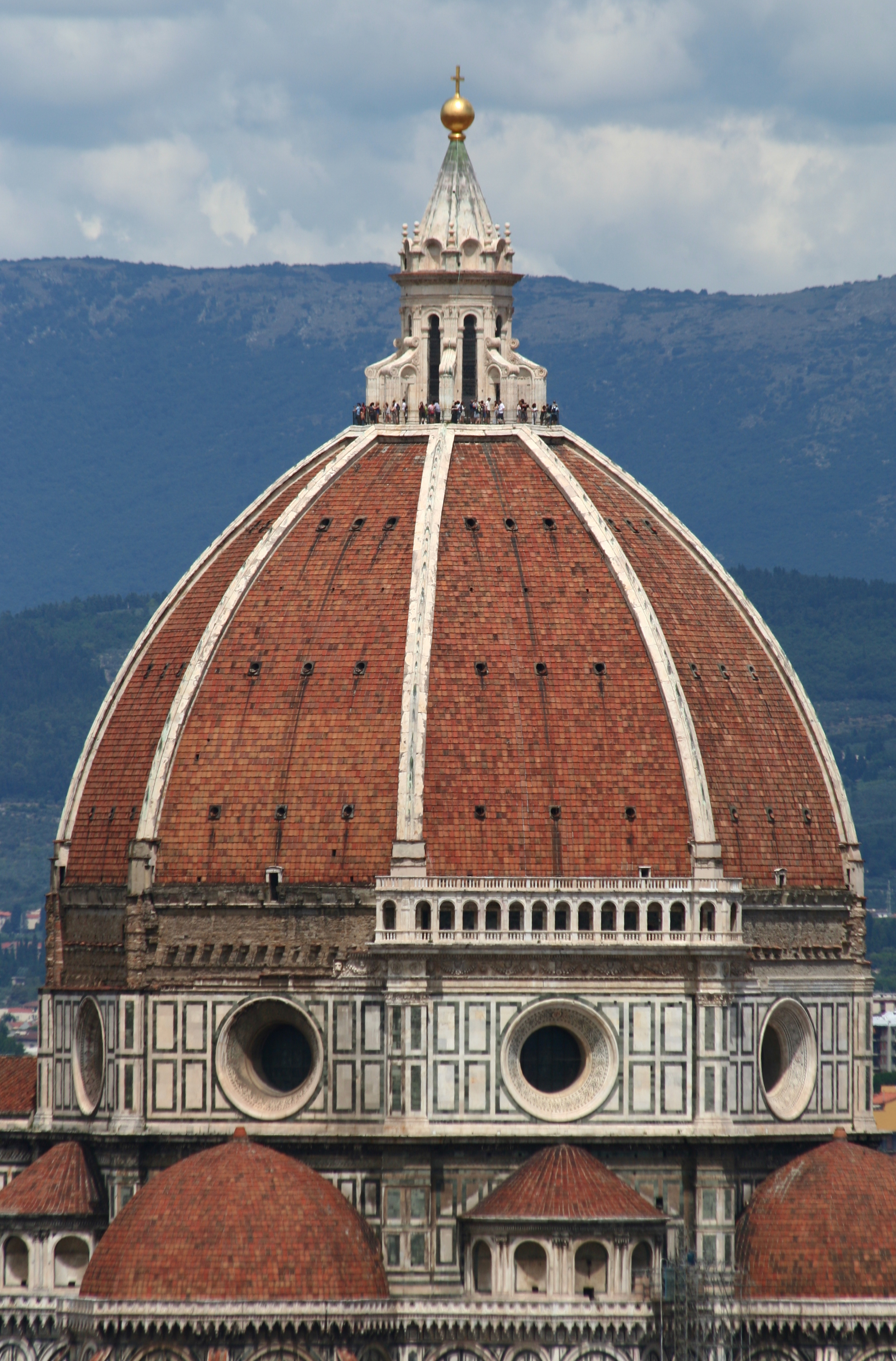
The Cathedral of Santa Maria del Fiore in Florence.

After years of considering options, Filippo Brunelleschi and Lorenzo Ghiberti were made joint leaders of the project to build the dome for Florence Cathedral in 1420. Brunelleschi's plan to use suspended scaffolding for the workers won out over alternatives such as building a provisional stone support column in the center of the crossing or filling the space with earth. The octagonal brick domical vault was built between 1420 and 1436, with Ghiberti resigning in 1433. The roof lantern surmounting the dome, also designed by Brunelleschi, was not begun until 1446, after his death. It was completed in 1467. He had also planned for a two-story external gallery and cornice to be built at the top of the drum where a strip of unclad masonry can be seen today. Although a portion of it was constructed on the southeast side beginning in 1508, work stopped after the visual effect was criticized by Michelangelo.

The dome is 42 meters wide and made of two shells. A stairway winds between them. Eight white stone external ribs mark the edges of the eight sides, next to the red tile roofing, and extend from the base of the dome to the base of the cupola. Each of the eight sides of the dome also conceals a pair of intermediate stone ribs that are connected to the main ribs by means of a series of masonry rings. A temporary wooden tension ring still exists near the bottom of the dome. Three horizontal chains of sandstone blocks notched together and reinforced with lead-coated iron cramps also extend the entire circumference of the dome: one at the base (where radial struts from this chain protrude to the exterior), one a third of the way up the dome, and one two thirds of the way up the dome. Only four major cracks have been observed on the inner dome, compared to about fourteen each on the domes of the Pantheon and St. Peter's Basilica.

Although the design of the dome is very different from that of the Pantheon and it is unclear what the influences were, it does share some similarities with earlier and smaller brick domes in Persia. The use of a herringbone pattern in the brick allowed for short horizontal sections of the layers of the dome to be completed as self-supporting units. Over 32 meters in height, it remains the largest masonry dome ever built. The dome is not itself Renaissance in style, although the lantern is closer.

=== Structure and style ===
The combination of dome, drum, pendentives, and barrel vaults developed as the characteristic structural forms of large Renaissance churches following a period of innovation in the later fifteenth century. Renaissance domes were a development of Romanesque domes and inspired by ancient Roman models, with the domes of medieval Islam also a potential influence. Florence was the first Italian city to develop the new style, followed by Rome, then Venice. From the late 15th century, semicircular arches became preferred in Milan, but round domes were less successful due to structural difficulties compared to those with pointed profiles.

==== Florence ====
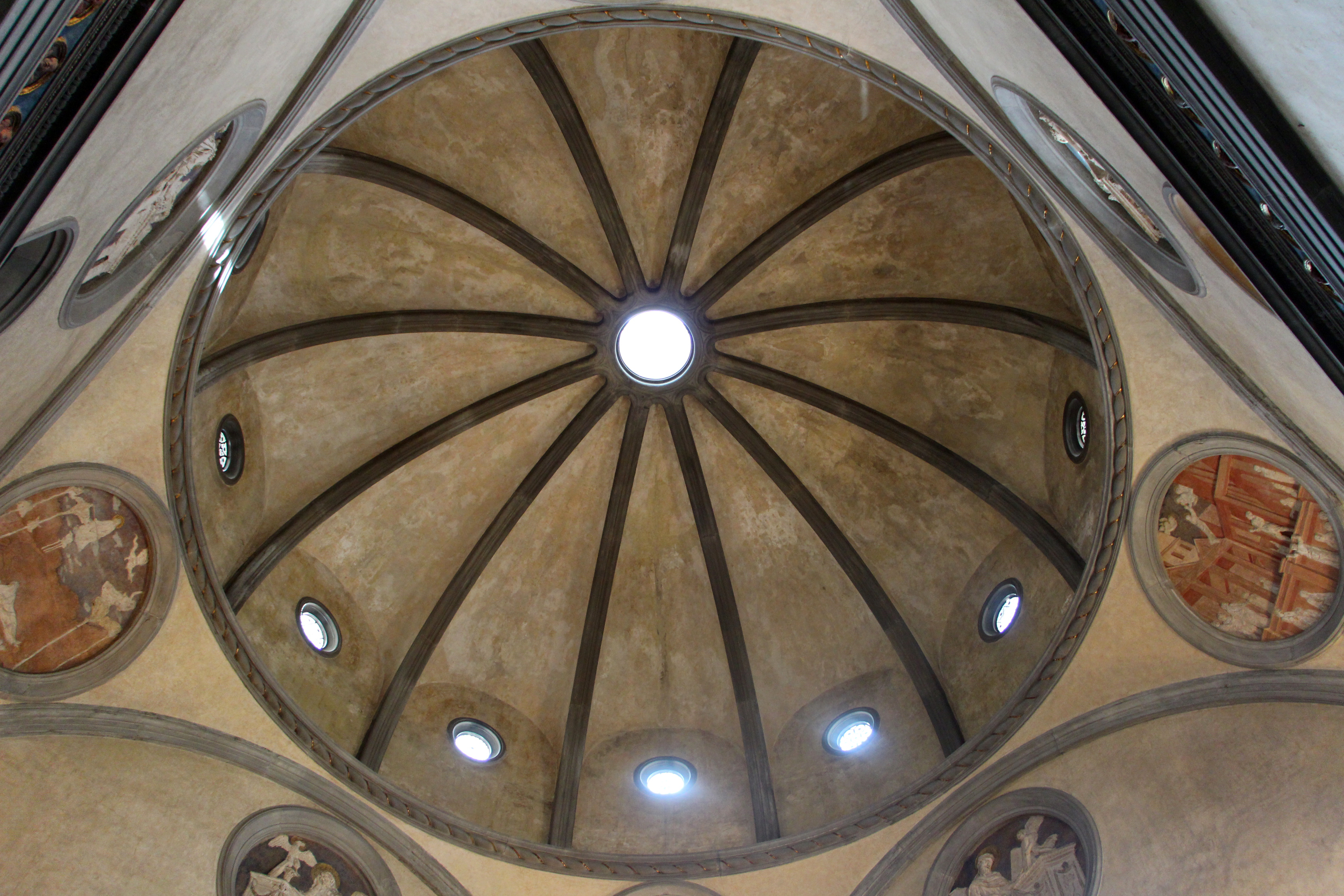
The Old Sacristy of the Basilica of San Lorenzo, Florence.

The examples from Florence are mostly from the early Renaissance, in the fifteenth century. Cities within Florence's zone of influence, such as Genoa, Milan, and Turin, mainly produced examples later, from the sixteenth century on. Brunelleschi's domes at San Lorenzo and the Pazzi Chapel established them as a key element of Renaissance architecture. His plan for the dome of the Pazzi Chapel in Florence's Basilica of Santa Croce (1430–52) illustrates the Renaissance enthusiasm for geometry and for the circle as geometry's supreme form. Twelve ribs between twelve circular windows converge on a small oculus. The circular dome rests on pendentives decorated with circular medallions of Florentine ceramic. This emphasis on geometric essentials would be very influential. The dome of the Certosa di Pavia (1396–1473) has a ribbed or spoked wheel design. The dome of San Sisto in Piacenza (1499–1514) is circular and also includes pendentives with circular medallions. Another early example is Giuliano da Sangallo's 1485 design of a dome on the church of Santa Maria delle Carceri in Prato. Like that of the Pazzi Chapel, the dome is ribbed. Another Renaissance dome with a ribbed or spoked wheel design is that of the Madonna di Campagna in Piacenza (1522–1528).

==== Rome ====
De re aedificatoria, written by Leon Battista Alberti and dedicated to Pope Nicholas V around 1452, recommends vaults with coffering for churches, as in the Pantheon, and the first design for a dome at St. Peter's Basilica in Rome is usually attributed to him, although the recorded architect is Bernardo Rossellino. Under Pope Nicholas V, construction started between 1451 and 1455 on an extension of the old St. Peter's Basilica to create a Latin cross plan with a dome and lantern 100 braccia high over a crossing 44 braccia wide (about 24.5 meters wide). Little more than foundations and part of the choir walls were completed before work stopped with the death of Nicholas V. This innovation would culminate in Bramante's 1505–6 projects for a wholly new St. Peter's Basilica, and throughout the sixteenth century the Renaissance set of dome and barrel vault would displace use of Gothic ribbed vaults.

==== Venice ====
Venetian Renaissance architecture, perhaps delayed due to Venice's political independence, was blended with the existing Venetian architectural tradition of Eastern influence. Pietro Lombardo designed the church of Santa Maria dei Miracoli (1481–89) with a dome over the sacristy. The masonry dome on a shallow drum and pendentives is covered by a taller outer wooden dome with a lantern. There is evident Byzantine influence in the line of three domes over the nave and crossing of the church of San Salvador, built between 1506 and 1534 by Giorgio Pietro Spavento and Tullio Lombardo.

== Sixteenth century ==
=== Bramante ===
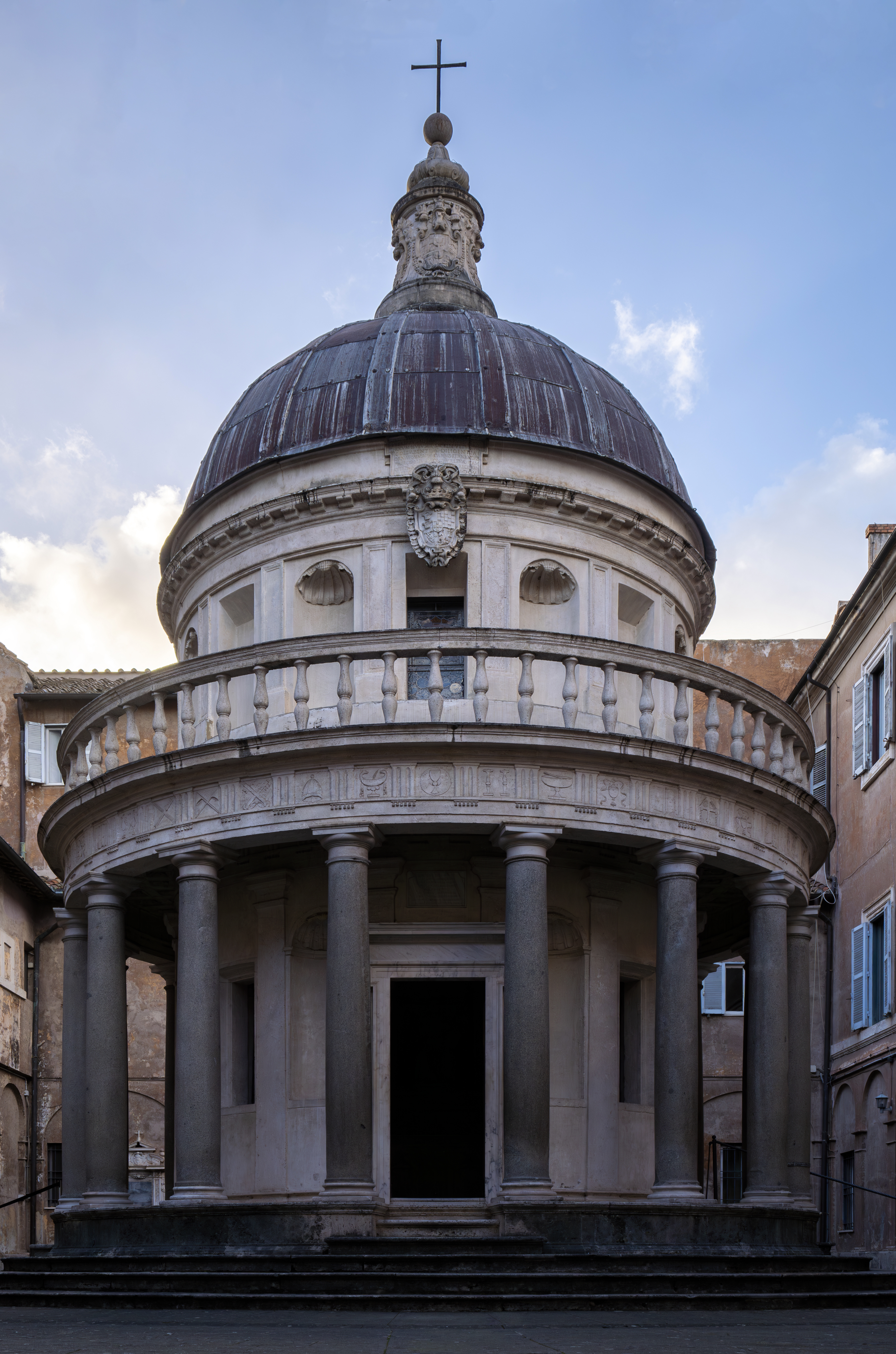
The Tempietto in Rome.

The Tempietto, a small domed building modelled on the Temple of Vesta, was built in 1502 by Bramante in the cloister of San Pietro in Montorio to commemorate the site of St. Peter's martyrdom. It has inspired numerous copies and adaptations since, including Radcliffe Camera, the mausoleum at Castle Howard, and the domes of St. Peter's Basilica, St Paul's Cathedral, the Panthéon, and the U.S. Capitol.

Bramante's initial design for the rebuilding of St. Peter's Basilica was for a Greek cross plan with a large central hemispherical dome and four smaller domes around it in a quincunx pattern. Work began in 1506 and continued under a succession of builders over the next 120 years. Bramante's project for St. Peter's marks the beginning of the displacement of the Gothic ribbed vault with the combination of dome and barrel vault. Proposed inspirations for Bramante's plan have ranged from some sketches of Leonardo da Vinci to the Byzantine quincunx church and the dome of Milan's Basilica of San Lorenzo. He completed the four massive central piers and the arches linking them by 1512, but cracking in the arches was detected between 1514 and 1534, possibly due to settling. The two eastern piers rest on solid marl and clay, while the other two rest upon remains of earlier Roman construction. That the piers and arches were left to stand with incomplete buttressing while construction stopped for over 30 years was also a factor.

=== Michelangelo ===
The Medici Chapel in Florence was designed by Michelangelo and built between 1521 and 1534.

Michelangelo inherited the project to design the dome of St. Peter's basilica in 1546. It had previously been in the hands of Bramante (with Giuliano da Sangallo and Fra Giovanni Giocondo) until 1514, Raphael Sanzio (assisted by Giuliano da Sangallo and Fra Giovanni Giocondo) until 1520, and Antonio da Sangallo the Younger (with Baldassare Peruzzi), whose work was disrupted by the sack of Rome in 1527. The design had been altered by Giuliano da Sangallo from being hemispherical to being 9 meters taller, segmental, and ribbed, and he had strengthened the piers and completed building the pendentives.

Michelangelo redesigned the dome to have two shells, a mostly brick internal structure, and three iron chains to resist outward pressure. His dome was a lower, hemispherical design. He further strengthened the piers by eliminating niches in them and the internal spiral staircase. Michelangelo obtained a decree from Pope Julius III that threatened an interdiction against anyone who altered his design, completed construction of the base for the drum by May 1558, and spent November 1558 to December 1561 creating a detailed wooden model. Construction of the drum was completed a few months after he died in 1564. Sixteen pairs of columns project out between sixteen windows in the drum to act as buttresses, and are aligned with the sixteen ribs of the dome and the paired columns of the lantern. An artist and sculptor, rather than an engineer, Michelangelo did not create full engineering plans for the dome and his model lacked construction details. The dome of St. Peter's basilica was later built by Giacomo della Porta and Domenico Fontana.

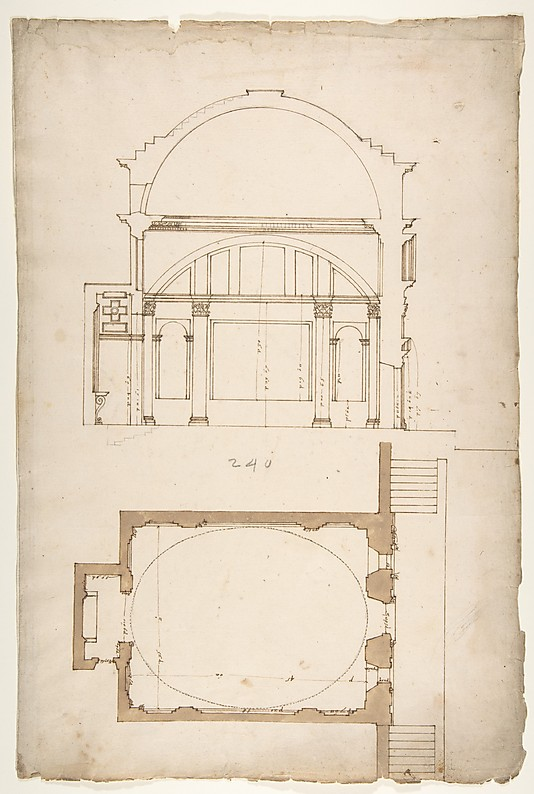
Plan and section of Sant'Andrea in Via Flaminia in Rome

=== Ovals ===
The publication of Sebastiano Serlio's treatise, one of the most popular architectural treatises ever published, was responsible for the spread of the oval in late Renaissance and Baroque architecture. Book I (1545), on geometry, included techniques to create ovals, and Book V (1547), on architecture, included a design for an oval church. The first church with an oval dome in the Renaissance period was the Sant'Andrea in Via Flaminia, built from 1550 to 1554 by Vignola. Use of the oval dome subsequently spread quickly through Italy, Spain, France, and central Europe. Such domes allowed for a synthesis of the two fundamental church types, longitudinal and central plan, and would become characteristic of Baroque architecture and the Counter-Reformation. The church of Sant'Anna dei Palafrenieri (c. 1568–1575), designed by Vignola and completed by his son Giacinto Barozzi, was the first church to have an oval dome over an oval plan.

=== Palladio ===
The Villa Capra, also known as "La Rotunda", was built by Andrea Palladio from 1565 to 1569 near Vicenza. Its highly symmetrical square plan centers on a circular room covered by a dome, and it would prove highly influential on the Georgian architects of 18th century England, architects in Russia, and architects in America, Thomas Jefferson among them. Palladio's two domed churches in Venice are Il Redentore (1577–92) and San Giorgio Maggiore (1565–1610), the former built in thanksgiving for the end of a bad outbreak of plague in the city.

=== St. Peter's Basilica ===
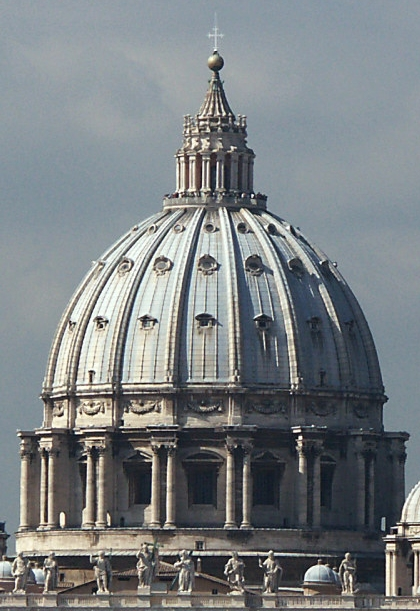
St. Peter's Basilica in Vatican City

Pope Sixtus V appointed Giacomo della Porta and Domenico Fontana in 1588 to begin construction of the dome of St. Peter's Basilica to Michelangelo's model. They made modifications to his design estimated to have reduced the tensile stresses in the dome by 40%, including thinning the two shells near the top, reducing the thickness and exterior projection of the ribs, raising the springing line by 4.8 meters, and changing the shape of the dome. Giacomo della Porta insisted on a vertically elliptical profile for the dome of St. Peter's Basilica, for structural reasons, and construction began in June 1588. The dome was completed up to the base of the lantern in May 1590, a few months before the death of Pope Sixtus V. The lantern and lead covering for the dome were completed later, with the brass orb and cross being raised in 1592.

The lantern is 17 meters high and the dome is 136.57 meters from the base to the top of the cross. The ogival dome was built with 16 ribs and an inner diameter of 42.7 meters. It begins above the drum and attico (the decorative strip above the drum), which are about 18 meters tall. The two shells of the dome are brick and each about 1.19 meters thick at the base of the dome. Because the shells separate from each other as they rise, the dome is 2.7 meters thick overall. The sixteen ribs connect the two shells together and are made of stone. Carlo Maderno's extended nave, built between 1609 and 1614, included bays covered by oval domes with lanterns.

Cracks in the dome were noticed as early as 1603, when the mosaics covering the dome interior were completed, and additional cracks were recorded after 1631 and in 1742, demonstrating progression. Five more tie rings were added around the dome in 1743-44 by Luigi Vanvitelli. The iron chains included in the design to contain the dome's lateral thrust have had to be replaced ten times since it was constructed. Giovanni Poleni's 1748 report on the state of the dome, written in response to observed cracking, anticipated the safe theorem by stating "explicitly that the stability of a structure can be established unequivocally if it can be shown that the thrust line lies completely within the masonry." His observation of cracks in the outer shell by the ribs has more recently been attributed by computer models to the heavy lantern.

== Bibliography ==
- Bagliani, Stefano (May 2009). "The Architecture and Mechanics of Elliptical Domes" (PDF). Proceedings of the Third International Congress on Construction History, Cottbus. Archived from the original (PDF) on 2013-10-16.
- Betts, Richard J. (March 1993). "Structural Innovation and Structural Design in Renaissance Architecture". Journal of the Society of Architectural Historians. 52 (1): 5–25. doi:10.2307/990755. JSTOR 990755.
- Chant, Colin; Goodman, David (1999). Pre-Industrial Cities and Technology. Routledge. ISBN 0-415-20076-8.
- Como, Mario (2013). Statics of Historic Masonry Constructions. Springer. ISBN 978-3-642-30131-5.
- Cowan, Henry J. (1977). "A History of Masonry and Concrete Domes in Building Construction". Building and Environment. 12 (1). Great Britain: Pergamon Press: 1–24. Bibcode:1977BuEnv..12....1C. doi:10.1016/0360-1323(77)90002-6. hdl:2027/mdp.39015041999635.
- Francia, Ennio (1982). "New St. Peter's". The Vatican: Spirit and Art of Christian Rome. New York: The Metropolitan Museum of Art: H.N. Abrams. pp. 62–88. ISBN 0-87099-348-8.
- Frankl, Paul; Crossley, Paul (2000). Gothic Architecture (illustrated, revised ed.). Yale University Press. ISBN 978-0-300-08799-4.
- Gentry, T. Russell; Lesniewski, Anatoliusz "Tolek" (2011). "Structural Design and Construction of Brunelleschi's Duomo di Santa Maria del Fiore". Eleventh North American Masonry Conference (NAMC). Minneapolis, Minnesota. June 5–8, 2011 (PDF).
- Giustina, Irene (2003), "On the art and the culture of domes. Construction in Milan and Lombardy in the late sixteenth and in the first half of the seventeenth century" (PDF), Proceedings of the First International Congress on Construction History, Madrid, Spain: Sociedad Española de Historia de la Construcción, pp. 1033–1042
- Hourihane, Colum, ed. (2012). The Grove Encyclopedia of Medieval Art and Architecture. Oxford University Press. ISBN 978-0-19-539536-5.
- Huerta, Santigo (2007). "Oval Domes: History, Geometry and Mechanics". Nexus Network Journal. Vol. 9. SAHGB Publications Limited. pp. 211–248. doi:10.1007/978-3-7643-8699-3_4. ISBN 978-3-7643-8444-9.
- Kuban, Doğan (1987). "The Style of Sinan's Domed Structures". Muqarnas. 4: 72–97. doi:10.2307/1523097. JSTOR 1523097.
- McNeil, Ian, ed. (2002). An Encyclopaedia of the History of Technology. Routledge. ISBN 978-1-134-98165-6.
- Melaragno, Michele G. (1991). An Introduction to Shell Structures: the Art and Science of Vaulting (softcover ed.). New York, New York: Van Nostrand Reinhold. ISBN 978-1-4757-0225-5.
- Millon, Henry A. (2005). "Michelangelo to Marchionni, 1546–1784". In Tronzo, William (ed.). St. Peter's in the Vatican. Cambridge University Press. pp. 93–110. ISBN 978-0-521-64096-1.
- Niglio, Olimpia (2012), "A scientific approach to the Dome of St. Peter in Rome. The expertise of three mathematicians of the Dotti's Roman Republic (1742)", in Tampone, Gennaro; Corazzi, Roberto; Mandelli, Emma (eds.), Proceedings of the International Congress. DOMES IN THE WORLD. Florence, 19th – 23rd March, 2012 (PDF), Florence: Nardini Editore, ISBN 978-8-840-44211-2
- Nuttgens, Patrick (1997). The Story of Architecture. Hong Kong: Phaidon Press Limited. ISBN 0-7148-3616-8.
- Schütz, Bernhard (2002). Great Cathedrals (illustrated ed.). Harry N. Abrams, Inc. ISBN 978-0-810-93297-5.
- Stephenson, Davis; Hammond, Victoria; Davi, Keith F. (2005). Visions of Heaven: the Dome in European Architecture (illustrated ed.). Princeton Architectural Press. ISBN 978-1-56898-549-7.
- The Dome, Uffici di Presidenza S.C.V.
