= Achille Serra =

Achille Serra may refer to:

- Achille Serra (architect), 19th-century Italian architect from Bologna
- Achille Serra (politician) (born 1941), Italian politician
