= Sant'Anna dei Palafrenieri =

Parish church of Vatican City

Church of Saint Anne in the Vatican
- Sant'Anna de' Parafrenieri
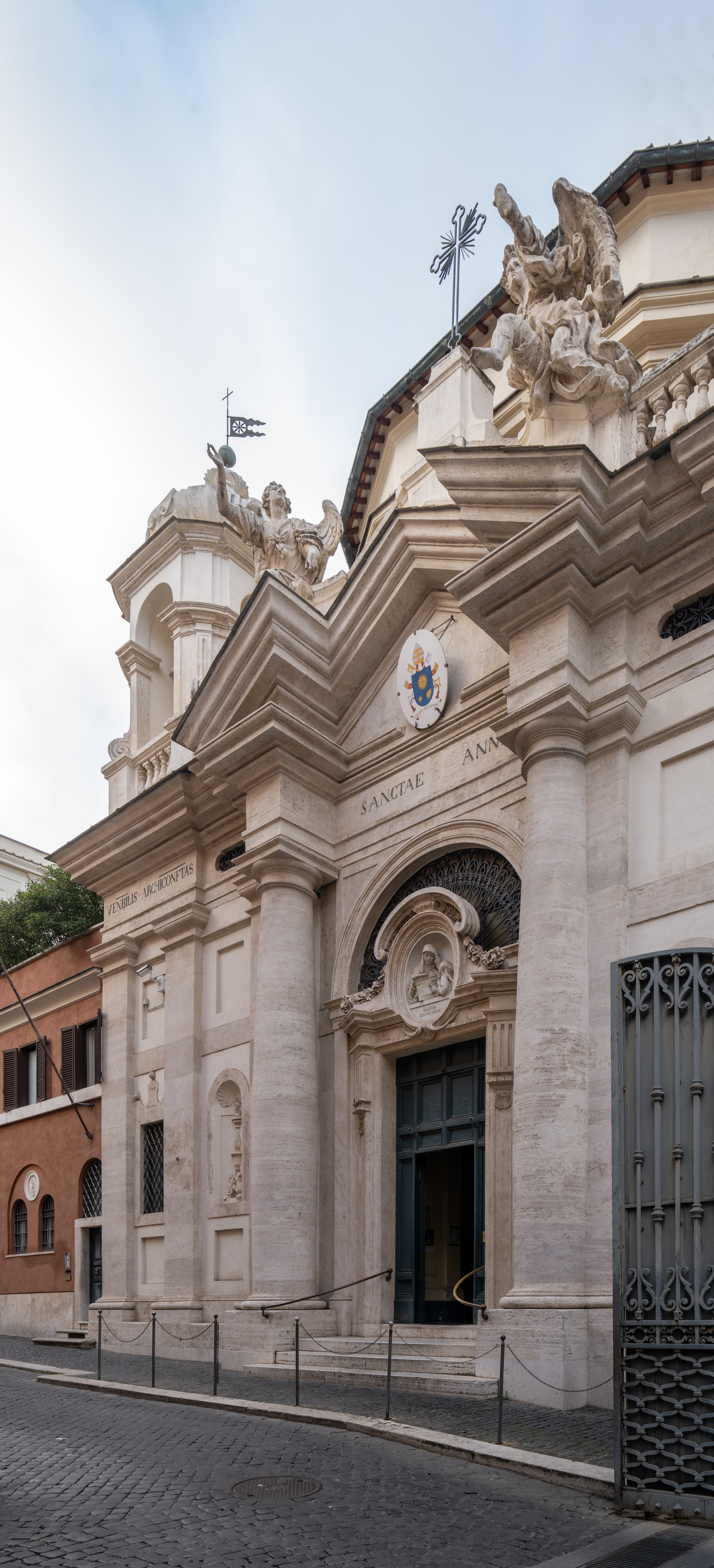

- Location on a map of Vatican City

Religion
- Affiliation: Catholic Church
- Ecclesiastical or organisational status: Parish church
- Leadership: P. Bruno Silvestrini
- Year consecrated: 1583

Location
- Location: Vatican City
- Coordinates: 41°54′15″N 012°27′27″E

Architecture
- Architects: Borromini, Giacomo Barozzi da Vignola
- Type: Church
- Style: Baroque
- Groundbreaking: 1565
- Completed: 1775

Specifications
- Direction of façade: S
- Length: 28 metres (92 ft)
- Width: 12 metres (39 ft)
- Height (max): 20 metres (66 ft)

Website
- www.santanna.va

The Church of Saint Anne in the Vatican (Italian: Sant'Anna in Vaticano), known as Sant'Anna de' Palafrenieri (English: Saint Anne of the Grooms), is a Catholic parish church dedicated to Saint Anne in Vatican City. The church is the parish church of the State of Vatican City and is placed under the jurisdiction of the Vicariate of the Vatican City and is located beside the Porta Sant'Anna (Saint Anne's Gate), an international border crossing between Vatican City State and Italy.

Commissioned by the Venerabile Arciconfraternita di Sant'Anna de Palafrenieri, Giacomo Barozzi da Vignola introduced the oval plan to church design, for the first time in the churches of Sant'Andrea in Via Flaminia and Saint Anne in Vatican, pioneering a plan which was to become influential to Baroque architecture.

== History ==
On 20 November 1565, Pope Pius IV authorized the Archconfraternity of the Pontifical Grooms to build a church dedicated to Saint Anne close to the Apostolic Palace. The construction began that same year on a design attributed to Renaissance architect Giacomo Barozzi da Vignola. It was one of the first churches in Rome with an elliptical plan. According to David Watkin, Vignola introduced the oval plan to church design for the first time in the churches of Sant'Andrea in Via Flaminia and Saint Anne in the Vatican, pioneering a plan which was to become influential to Baroque architecture.

After a smooth start, the construction of the church slowed because the Archconfraternity was in financial trouble. After Vignola's death in 1573, the church was finished by his son Giacinto Barozzi, according to a payment made by the Archconfraternity. When it was consecrated in 1583 it had a temporary roof. The facade attributed to Borromini and later attached to the oval church prefigured the facade of the church of Sant'Agnese in Agone in attempting to reconcile a front with five bats to two towers. The facade was completed between 1700 and 1721 by Alessandro Specchi while the dome was finally built in 1763 and completed in 1775.

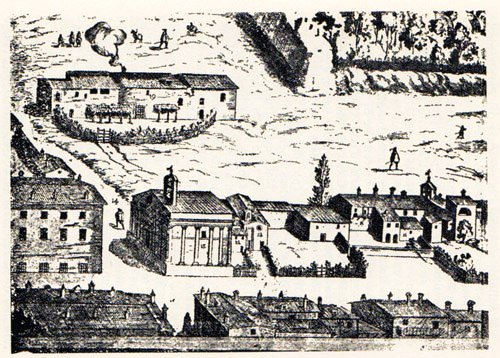
Engraving of 1615, which shows the gabled roof, with the bell tower

The Archconfraternity briefly exhibited in St. Anne a painting of the saint it commissioned in 1603 from Caravaggio. Destined for the altar of the papal Grooms in the Basilica of Saint Peter, it was painted in 1605–1606, Madonna and Child with St. Anne. It was later sold to Cardinal Scipione Borghese and now hangs in the museum of the Galleria Borghese.

The church belonged to the Archconfraternity until the Lateran Treaties of 1929, which constituted the Vatican City. Pope Pius XI elevated the church into a parish, with the Apostolic Constitution "Ex Lateranensi pacto" of 30 May 1929. The pastoral care of the new parish was entrusted to the Augustinian Order.

In return, Pope Pius XI granted the Archconfraternity the church of Santa Caterina della Rota.

== Interior ==
The interior, built to Vignola's design, is elliptical with eight side chapels. The main entrance is located at one end of the major axis of the ellipse. The minor axis ends with two chapels.

Four doors surmounted by a pediment and framed by travertine columns with Corinthian capitals are distributed between the main altar and the side chapels. Four large arches rise at the ends of the two main axes, framing the areas of entry, the altar and the two chapels. The sacred area of the main altar is a square enclosed by four arches as a clear counterpoint to the oval part of the church.

The dome itself rests on a plinth with a cornice with three strips, pierced at the base by eight windows. At the top of the dome stands the lantern, the only source of natural light onto the main altar. It is decorated with the dove of the Holy Spirit, from which golden rays radiate in circle.

Until the mid-18th century, the inner walls of the church were white and the columns showed the natural color of the travertine stone, typical of Renaissance churches. Influenced by the rise of the Baroque in Rome, the Archconfraternity started redecorating the church with more lavish decorations and plenty of gilt and stucco. The façade was re-decorated in the Baroque style by Alessandro Specchi who added the upper facade to Vignola's church. The dome was designed by Francesco Navole. They commissioned in 1746 the sculptor Giovan Battista de' Rossi (Il Rosso) to redecorate the church with angels holding garlands in stucco above the doors. Four windows were walled and replaced with four frescoes depicting scenes from the life of Saint Anne. Giovan Battista de' Rossi also made in stucco shells with festoons decorating the frescoes. The decorator Annibale Rotati (c. 1673–1750) colored the walls in blue, cream and light gray. The doorjambs were decorated with marble stucco marbled by Giacomo de Rocchi. The gold and silver stucco was made by Pietro Ricci. Despite the Baroque decoration, the initial plan of the church is still visible.

== See also ==
- Madonna and Child with St. Anne (Dei Palafrenieri)
- Index of Vatican City-related articles
- 17th-century Western domes
