= Madonna and Child with Saint Anne (Dei Palafrenieri) =

Painting by Caravaggio

Madonna and Child with St Anne
- Madonna dei Palafrenieri (Italian)
- Artist: Caravaggio
- Year: 1605–1606
- Medium: Oil on canvas
- Dimensions: 292 cm × 211 cm (115 in × 83 in)
- Location: Galleria Borghese; Rome

The Madonna and Child with St. Anne (Dei Palafrenieri) or Madonna and the Serpent, is one of the mature religious works of the Italian Baroque master Caravaggio, painted in 1605–1606, for the altar of the Archconfraternity of the Papal Grooms (Italian: Arciconfraternita di Sant'Anna de Parafrenieri) in the Basilica of Saint Peter and taking its theme from Genesis 3:15. The painting was briefly exhibited in the parish church for the Vatican, Sant'Anna dei Palafrenieri, before its removal, due to its unorthodox portrayal of the Virgin Mary. There are a lot of reasons why the piece may have been removed, such as the nudity of the child Jesus and the Virgin Mary revealing too much of her breast. The reputation of the model that Caravaggio used to portray the Virgin Mary could be another reason as to why this altarpiece was withdrawn. The altarpiece was sold to Cardinal Scipione Borghese and now hangs in his palazzo (Galleria Borghese).

== History ==
Caravaggio received this commission from the Confraternity for Palafrenieri on December 1, 1605. He worked on the piece and completed it in under four months. It is unknown as to why the Confraternity picked Caravaggio to do the altarpiece; it is known that he was paid 25 scudi for the painting, according to a document found by scholar Luigi Spezzaferro, dated October 31. The altarpiece was placed in the new basilica on April 8 and was removed again on April 16, to the Palafrenieri's Church of St. Anne, a church in honor of Saint Anne.

=== Model ===
The model that Caravaggio used to depict as the Virgin Mary was named Maddalena Antonietti, also known as Lena. Lena modeled for Caravaggio before, in his piece called Madonna of the Pilgrims., also known as the Madonna of Loreto (1603). Caravaggio developed a deep relationship with the model Lena, which explains why she was used in other works. Maurizio Marini has noted that while many have stated that Lena was a prostitute; there is no evidence to confirm this. However, this relationship was more serious compared to the other mistresses Caravaggio had. She came from a lower class and modeled for artists to support herself.

=== Removal and rejection ===
Spezzaferro believed that the painting was removed due to the way Caravaggio depicted St. Anne. Traditionally in Christianity, Saint Anne was praised as a symbol of Grace. Caravaggio depicted her as if she were just an ordinary older woman standing next to Mary and Christ. Another reason as to why the painting may have been removed was that Caravaggio did not put enough effort into depicting the Holy Family grouping. It was not the first time one of Caravaggio's paintings was removed from a church; another example is the Death of the Virgin, which was removed from Santa Maria della Scala.

Art historian John Spike is not sure as to what the main reason this piece was removed and he cannot pinpoint it to one specific reason. Scholar Maurizio Marini believed one of the biggest reasons Caravaggio's altarpiece was removed was due to his being a murderer that committed many crimes. Caravaggio killed Ranuccio Tomassoni of Terni in a duel. The Church had the altarpiece up for two months and later it was removed.

Another reason for the rejection could be that Caravaggio used the model Lena to depict her as the Virgin Mary. The Church may have rejected the piece knowing Lena was not an appropriate person to represent a holy figure since she was a prostitute. Lena developed a relationship with Mariano Pasqualone that led Caravaggio to attack Pasqualone with a sword at a restaurant called Via Della Scrofa.

The infant Jesus being fully naked may have also caused controversy and could be another reason as to why the altarpiece was removed from St. Peter's. During the Counter-Reformation, the Church did not want to display art that displayed nudity, especially depicting such a holy entity.

== Iconography ==
=== Depiction ===
While not his most successful arrangement, it is an atypical representation of the Virgin Mary for its time and must have been shocking to some contemporary viewers. It depicts the Virgin Mary who, with the aid of her son, whom she holds, tramples and crushes a serpent, the emblem of evil or original sin. Serpents also symbolized heresy. Mary and Jesus are looking down upon the serpent and crushing it together under their feet. The snake is coiling up, rejecting the presence of all three figures. Both Mary and Jesus are barefoot, and Jesus is a fully naked uncircumcised child.

=== Saint Anne ===
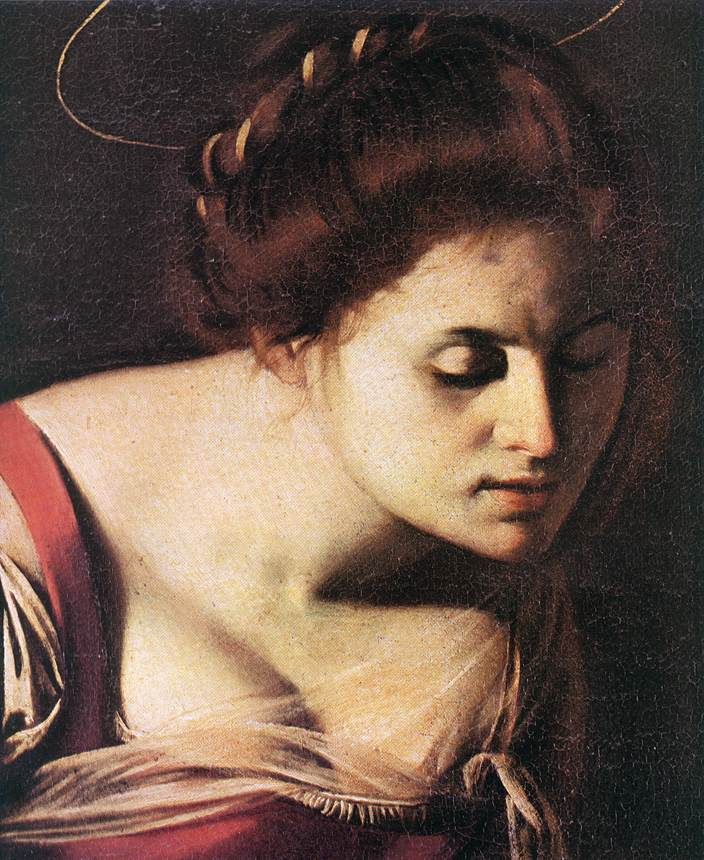
A close-up image of Virgin Mary showing her breast. This visual could possibly be why the altarpiece was removed.

Saint Anne, whom the painting is intended to honor, is a wrinkled old grandmother, who witnesses the event. She is depicted more loosely, sketchily, and thinner than the other two figures. Saint Anne is on the farther right wearing a dark navy-blue dress. She is the mother of the Virgin Mary and the grandmother of Jesus Christ. The Virgin Mary and Saint Anne are depicted with thin gold ring halos. However, Jesus is the only figure who does not have a halo. Usually in Christian artwork, Jesus is depicted having the brightest halo in order to draw attention to him; Caravaggio did not follow convention in this painting.

=== Jesus ===
Jesus's left hand is depicted in a gesture of his middle finger and thumb together, creating a circle. Everything else is in shadow, and the figures gain monumentality in the light. This depiction is known as tenebrism. The brightest figure in this altarpiece is Jesus. The light shines on him to bring focus and as a reference to "the light of the world,” stated John Spike. He has more power compared to his mother and grandmother. Mary receives more light compared to Saint Anne because of her physical and spiritual proximity to her son. Mary and Saint Anne both represent and have a status in the Christian hierarchy, but less than Jesus. Some light is shed on the serpent as it is being crushed by Jesus and the Virgin Mary.

=== Nudity ===
Caravaggio depicted Jesus as nude because showing his genitals represents the true human body. Caravaggio and Michelangelo believed that depicting him nude let the viewers know that Jesus came to be represented as a free human nature from the "Adamic contagion of shame," stated by Leo Steinberg. The contagion of shame was physical health and death.

Mary is leaning with her son; her cleavage is showing and she is seen wearing a tightly fitted bodice. This iconography of the breast came from the medieval period and represents the Madonna of Mercy’s breast milk. Breast milk is the substance that would nourish Christ and was seen as a symbol of her role as Co-redemptrix. The breasts of Mary can be compared to Christ’s wounds.

=== Virgin Mary's clothing ===
In this painting, Mary's clothing again deviates from her norm; she is usually depicted wearing a veil, mantle and dress in blue and white. At this time young Roman women would wear the kind of dress seen here. In this painting, Caravaggio depicted her wearing a veil neckline dress that reveals the tops of her breasts.

== See also ==
- List of paintings by Caravaggio
