= Cailungo =

Curazie of Borgo Maggiore, San Marino

- Curazie
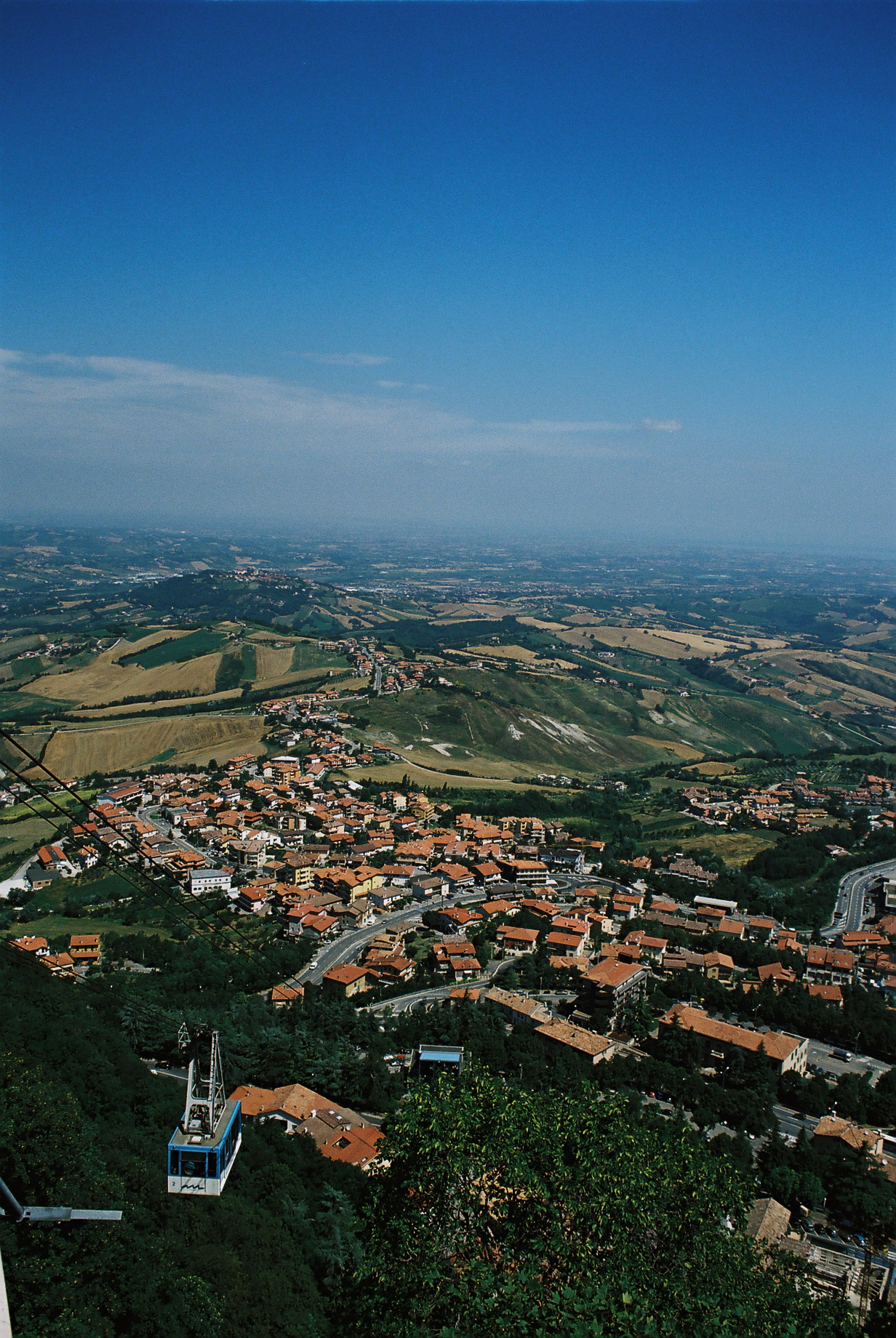
- Cailungo

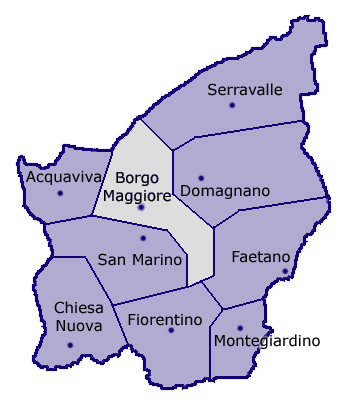
- Location of Borgo Maggiore within San Marino

- Location within San Marino
- Coordinates: 43°57′6.84″N 12°27′14.72″E
- Country: San Marino
- Castello: Borgo Maggiore
- Constituent curazie: List: Cailungo di Sopra, Cailungo di Sotto
- Elevation: 360 m (1,180 ft)

Population (2023)
  - Total: 2,076
- Demonym: Cailunghesi
- Time zone: UTC+1 (CET)
  - Summer (DST): UTC+2 (CEST)
- Postal code: 47893
- Area code: +378 (0549)

Cailungo is a settlement in San Marino comprising two curazie, Cailungo di Sopra and Cailungo di Sotto, in the castello of Borgo Maggiore.

== Geography ==
The village is located at the north of its castle seat, and its main road is via Ca' dei Lunghi.

== Infrastructures ==
Cailungo is the seat of the Sanmarinese State Hospital (Ospedale di Stato di San Marino) and the State Agency for Public Services of San Marino (Azienda Autonoma di Stato per i Servizi Pubblici).

== Sport ==
The local football team is the S.P. Cailungo.

== Oratorio di San Rocco ==
The church, Oratorio di San Rocco, was originally built in connection with a plague in the Middle Ages in honour of San Rocco. The interior has an oil on canvas painting of Madonna and Child and St. John the Baptist dated to 1594.
