= Basilica di San Marino =

Catholic church in San Marino

Coordinates: 43°56′13″N 12°26′48″E

Co-Cathedral Basilica di San Marino
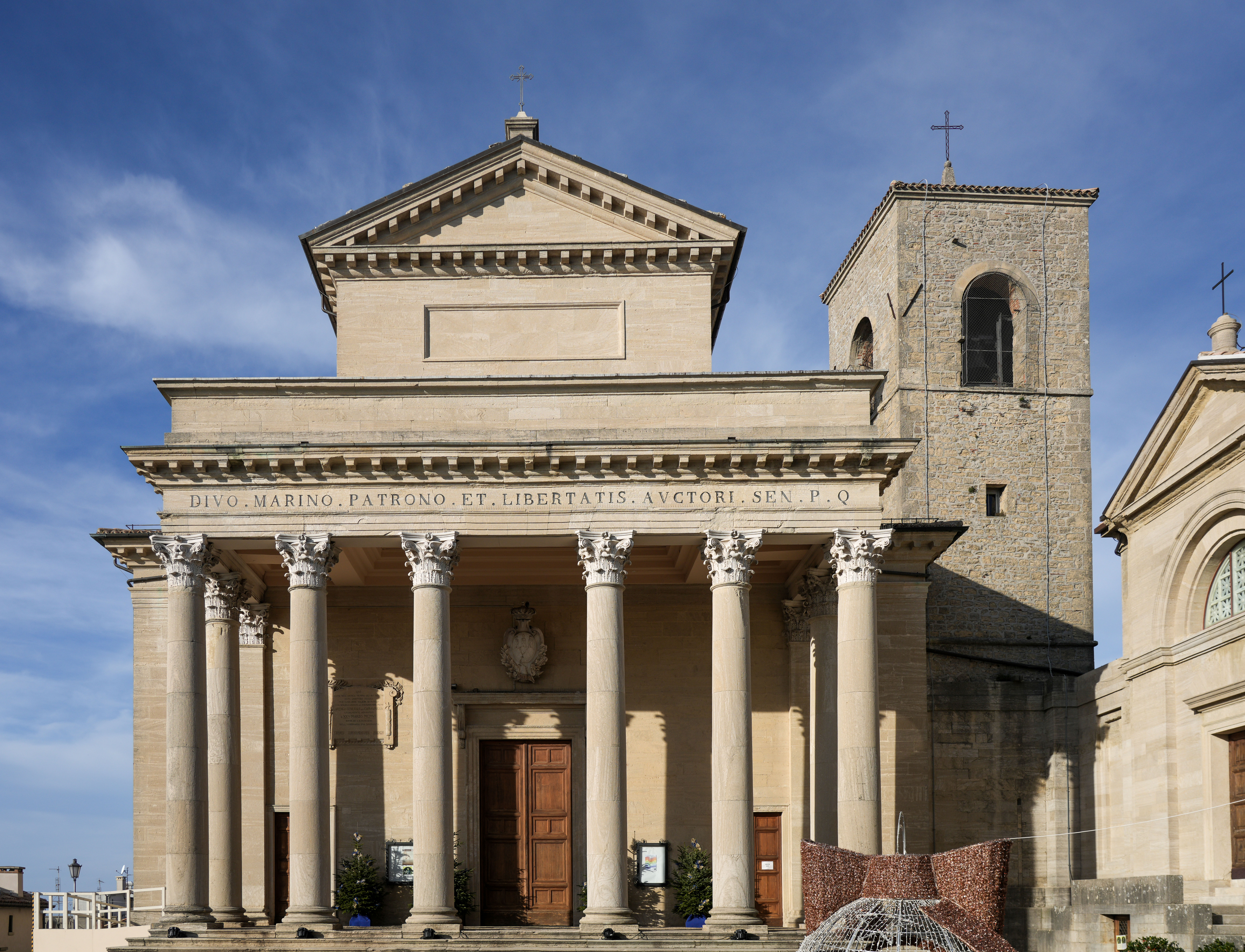
- View of Basilica di San Marino

Religion
- Affiliation: Roman Catholic
- Ecclesiastical or organizational status: Basilica

Location
- Location: City of San Marino, San Marino
- Interactive map of Co-Cathedral Basilica di San Marino

Architecture
- Style: Neoclassical
- Completed: 1838
- Construction cost: 40,150 scudi and 76 baiocchi

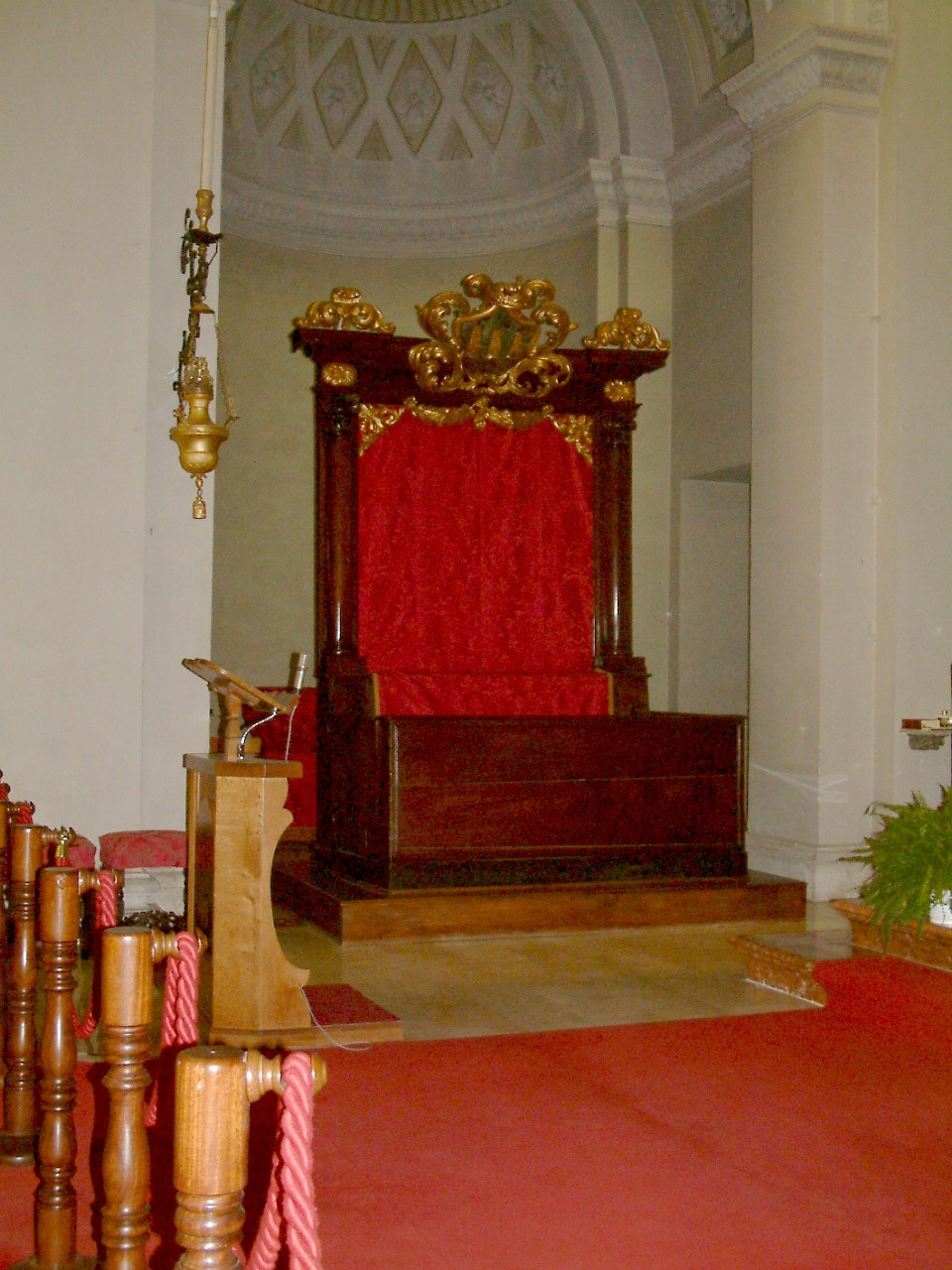
Throne of the Captains-Regent inside the basilica

The Basilica of Saint Marinus (Italian: Basilica di San Marino) is a Catholic church located in the Republic of San Marino. While the country has a distinct domination of historic religious buildings of Christian faith, the basilica is the main church of the City of San Marino. It is situated on Piazzale Domus Plebis on the northeastern edge of the city, adjacent to the Church of Saint Peter. It is dedicated to Saint Marinus, the founder and patron of the Republic.

The church has the status of co-cathedral of the Catholic Diocese of San Marino-Montefeltro.

The present church was built in 1836 in place of an earlier one that dated to 7th century. It is built in the Neoclassical style, with a porch of eight Corinthian columns. Relics of Saint Marinus are enshrined in the church.

== History ==
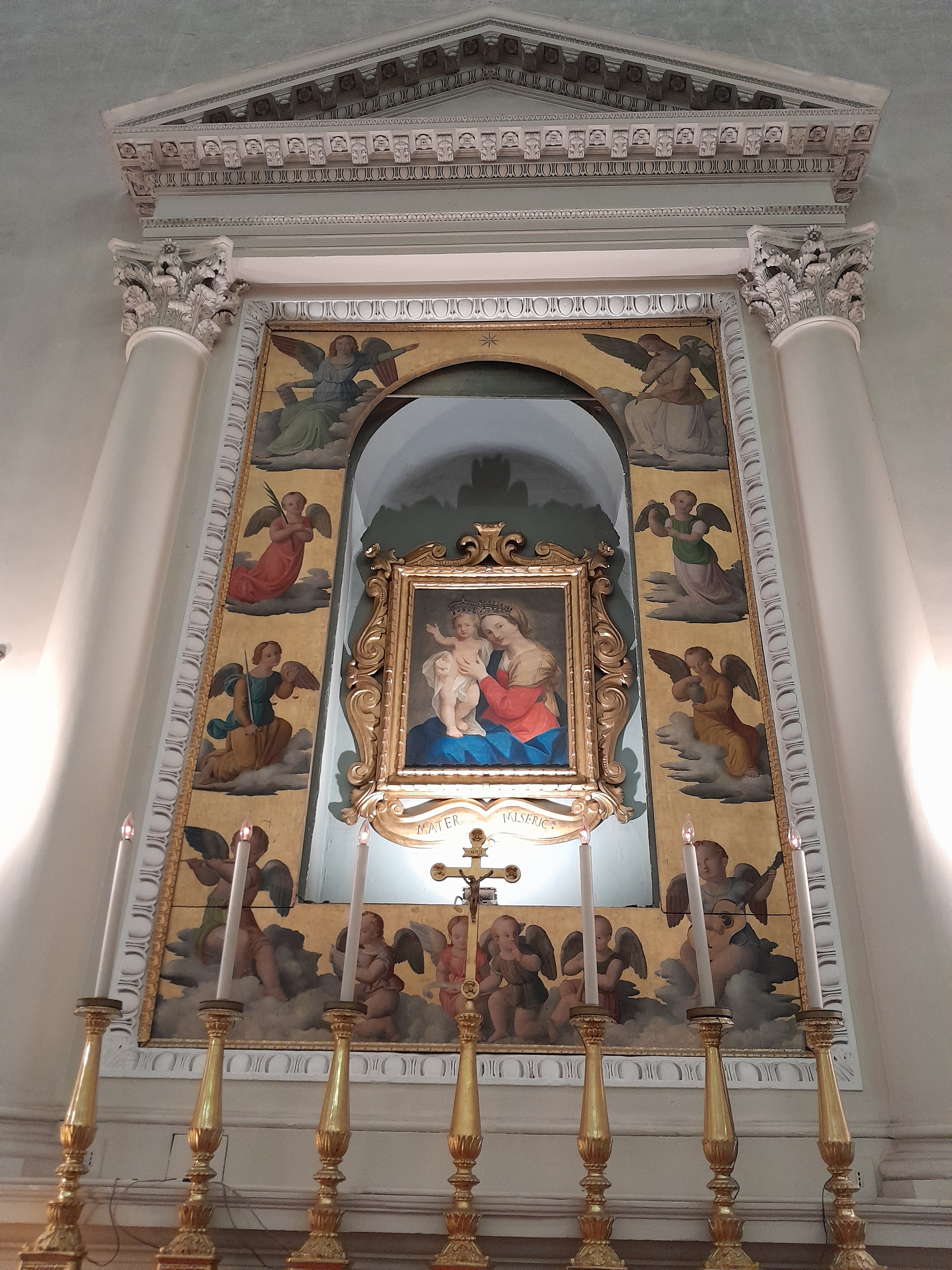
Interior

An earlier church was erected on the spot in the 4th century, dedicated to the same patron saint. The earliest mention of the existence of a church (particularly, a monastery) in the area, the Placito Feretrano, ostensibly dates from 885, although it is only known from an 11th-century copy. The first document that directly relates to the Pieve di San Marino is dated 31 July 1113, with donations from the faithful.

By the beginning of the 19th century, the church building was in critical condition. In 1807, it was demolished and a project for the construction of a replacement was commissioned from the Bolognese architect Achille Serra. On 24 July 1825, the council decided to build a new church on the same site as the former one. Construction began on 28 July 1826 and was completed in 1838. The construction cost 40,150 scudi and 76 baiocchi. On 5 February 1838, the church was solemnly consecrated by the Bishop of Montefeltro, Crispino Agostinucci in the presence of the Captains Regent. On 21 July 1926, it was raised by Pius XI to the rank of Basilica.

The Basilica of Saint Marinus is depicted on the ten-cent Sammarinese euro coins.

On 29 August 1982, the basilica received a solemn visit from Pope John Paul II, who venerated relics of Saint Marinus.

Over the course of centuries, the basilica has been the object of civil contestation, so in 1992 the Holy See issued a number of decrees. Among other provisions, these established that the basilica, as mother church of all churches within the Republic, is exempt from the jurisdiction of the parish of the city of San Marino. The priest to whom it is entrusted holds the title of Rector.

== Architecture ==
The interior of the basilica consists of three naves, supported by sixteen Corinthian columns which form a large ambulatory around the semicircular apse. The front porch of 8 columns, six at the front and two either side, bears the Latin inscription above: “DIVO. MARINO. PATRONO. ET. LIBERTATIS. AVCTORI. SEN. P. Q.”

The altar is adorned by a statue of Saint Marinus by Adamo Tadolini, a student of Antonio Canova. Under the altar are relics of the saint, which were found on 3 March 1586; some relics were donated to the island of Rab (Croatia), the saint’s birthplace, on 28 January 1595. A reliquary bust in silver and gold dated to 2 September 1602 lies to the right of altar. In the right aisle is a side altar dedicated to Mary Magdelene and a painting by Elisabetta Sirani, on the subject Noli me tangere that depicts her encounter with the Risen Christ.

== Chiesa di San Pietro ==
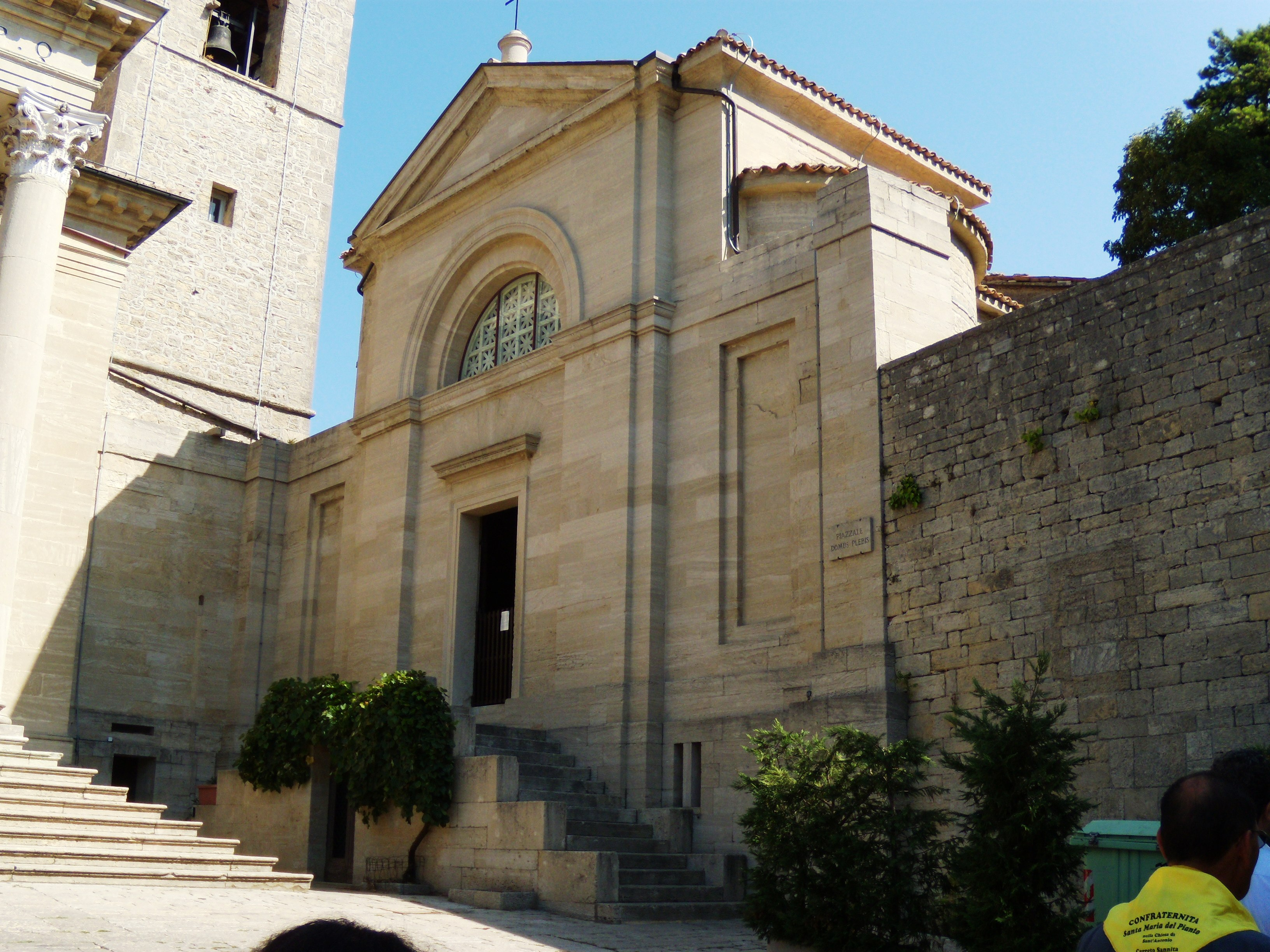
Chiesa di San Pietro

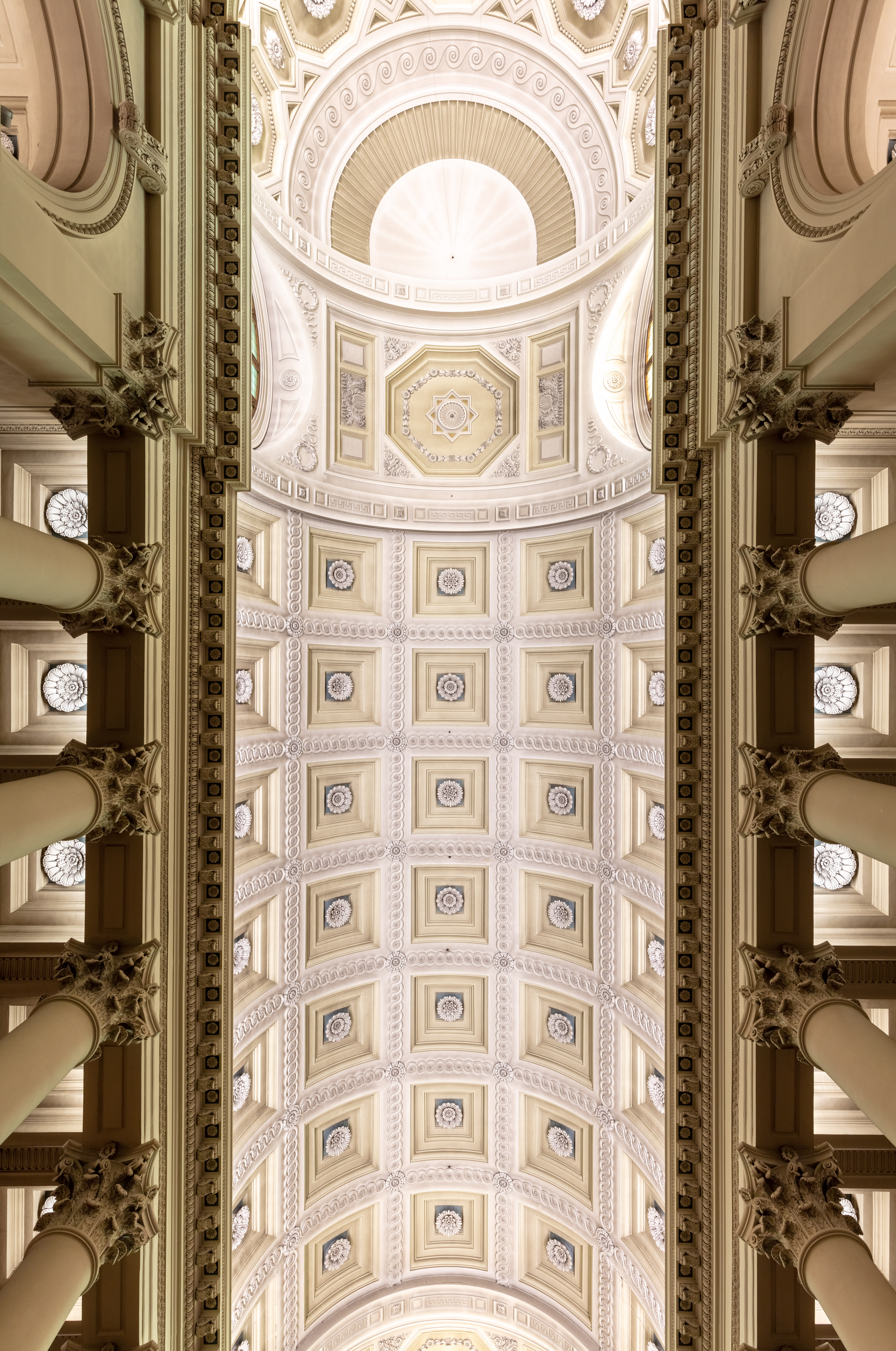
Ceiling of the church

The Chiesa di San Pietro is located adjacent to the Basilica of San Marino, by the front steps. Originally built in 600, it houses a valuable altar with inlaid marble, donated by the musician Antonio Tedeschi in 1689, surmounted by a statue of Saint Peter by Enrico Saroldi.

In the church crypt are two, rock-cut niches, said to have been the beds of Saint Marinus and Saint Leo. Inside is a monument to Pope John XXIII, erected by the Government of the Republic.

== Celebrations ==
Several liturgical celebrations are stipulated for the basilica. Amongst these are the twice-yearly election and Investiture of the Captains-Regent (1 April and 1 October); the anniversary of the Aregno and the Sammarinese Militia (25 March); the Feast of Saint Marinus, Founder and Patron of the Republic (3 September), Liberation Day and Feast of Saint Agatha of Sicily, patroness of the Republic (5 February); and the Feast of Corpus Christi (60 days after Easter, in May or June).

The basilica can also function as a venue for popular events, such as the XII Autumn Music Festival production in 2010 of Mozart's Requiem Mass.
