= Santuario della Beata Vergine della Consolazione =

Church in Borgo Maggiore, San Marino

Coordinates: 43°56′26″N 12°26′51″E

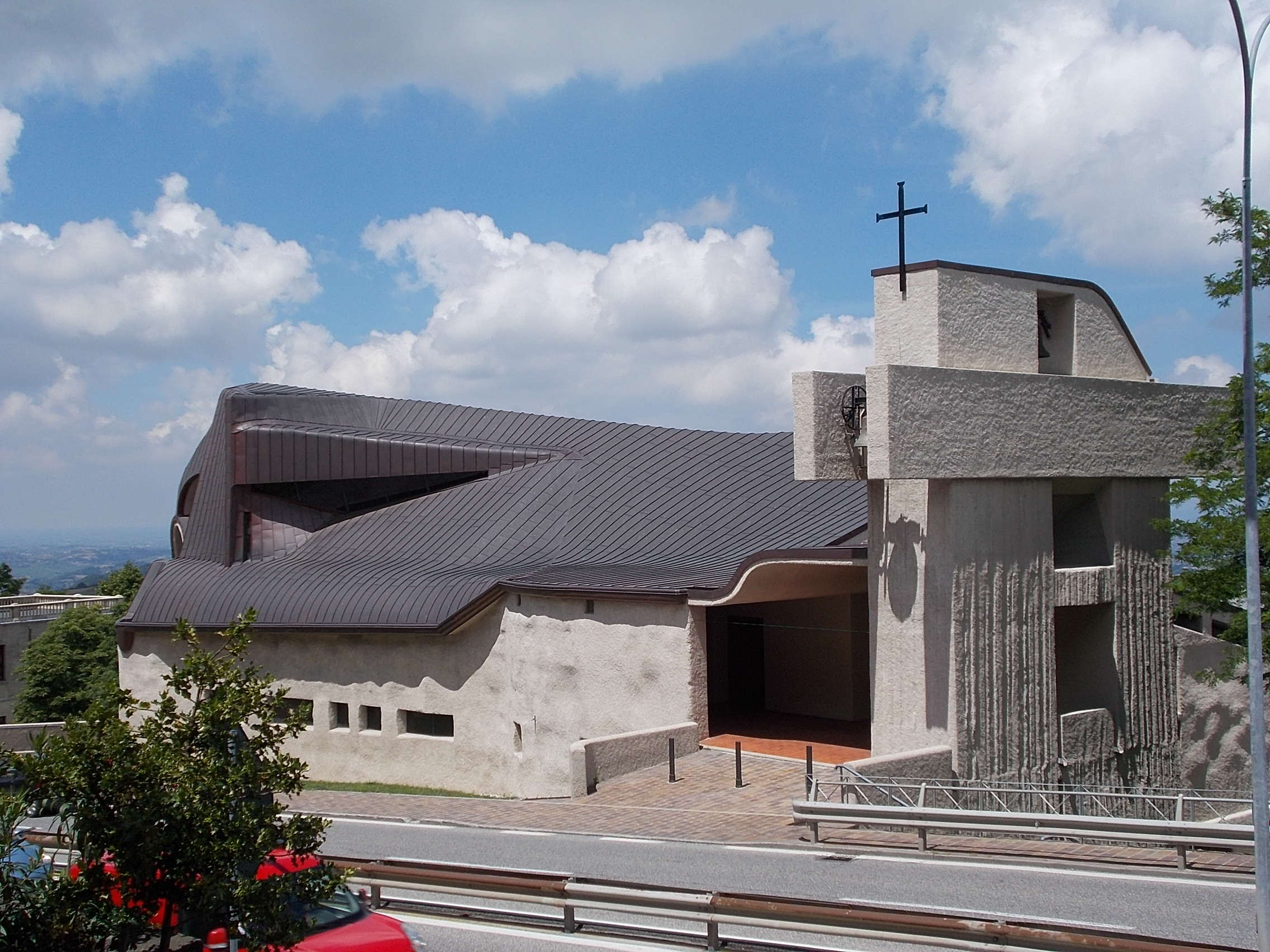
Santuario della Beata Vergine della Consolazione

Santuario della Beata Vergine della Consolazione is a church in San Marino. It belongs to the Roman Catholic Diocese of San Marino-Montefeltro. It was built in 1964 and consecrated in 1967.
