= Crispino Agostinucci (general) =

Italian military figure and major-general

Crispino Agostinucci (1882–1969) was an Italian military figure and a major-general in both the Royal Italian Army and the later Italian army. Agostinucci served as Chief of Staff Royal Carabinieri from 1931 to 1935, as General Officer Commanding Royal Carabinieri Albania from 1940 to 1941 as Deputy Commander in Chief Royal Carabinieri from 1940 to 1942, and as president of the National Association of Carabinieri from 1947 until his retirement in 1961.
