= Achille Serra (architect) =

Achille Serra was a Bolognese architect who was involved in rebuilding the Basilica di San Marino from 1826 to 1838.

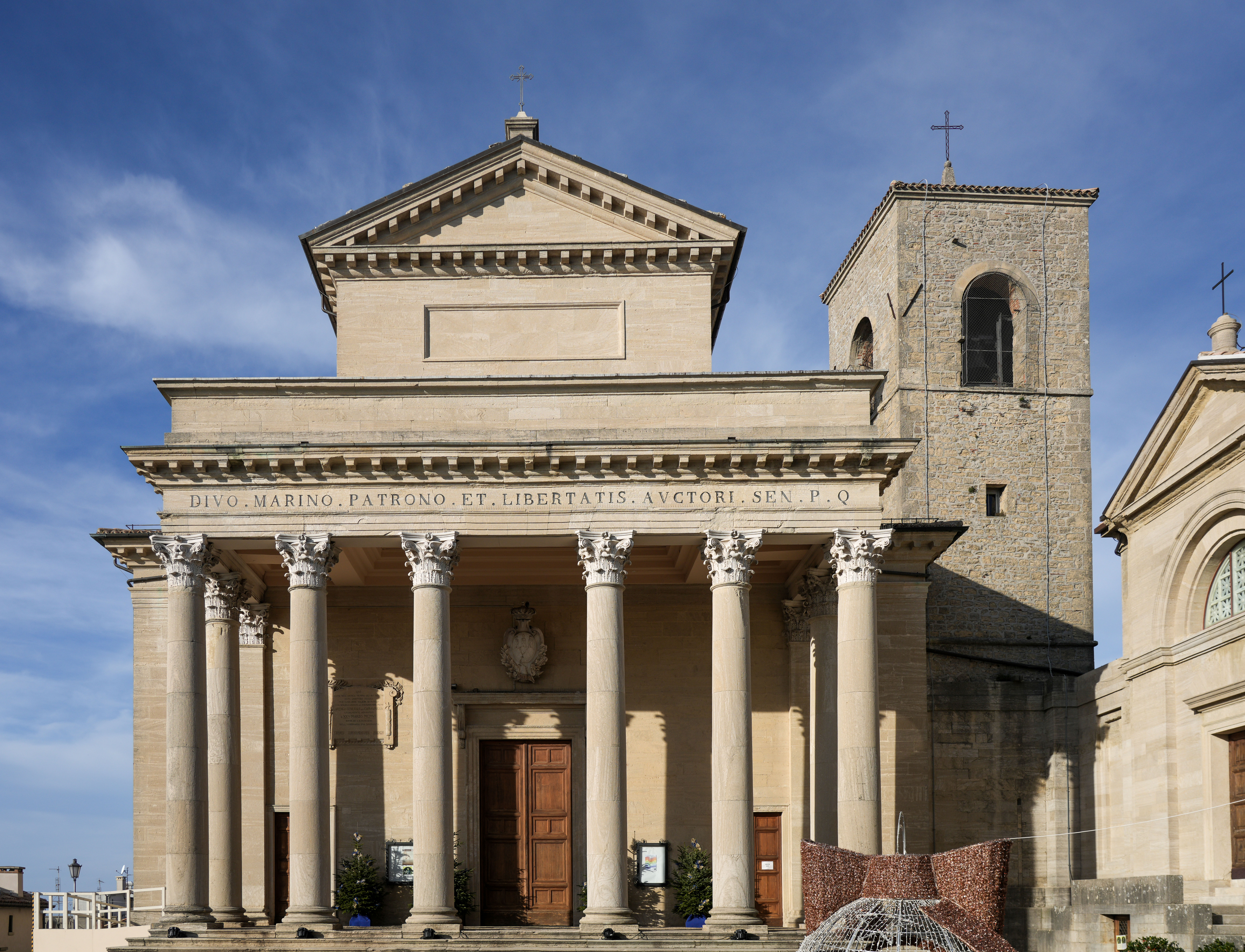
View of Basilica di San Marino
