= Chiesa di San Pietro (San Marino) =

Church in San Marino

Coordinates: 43°56′13″N 12°26′49″E

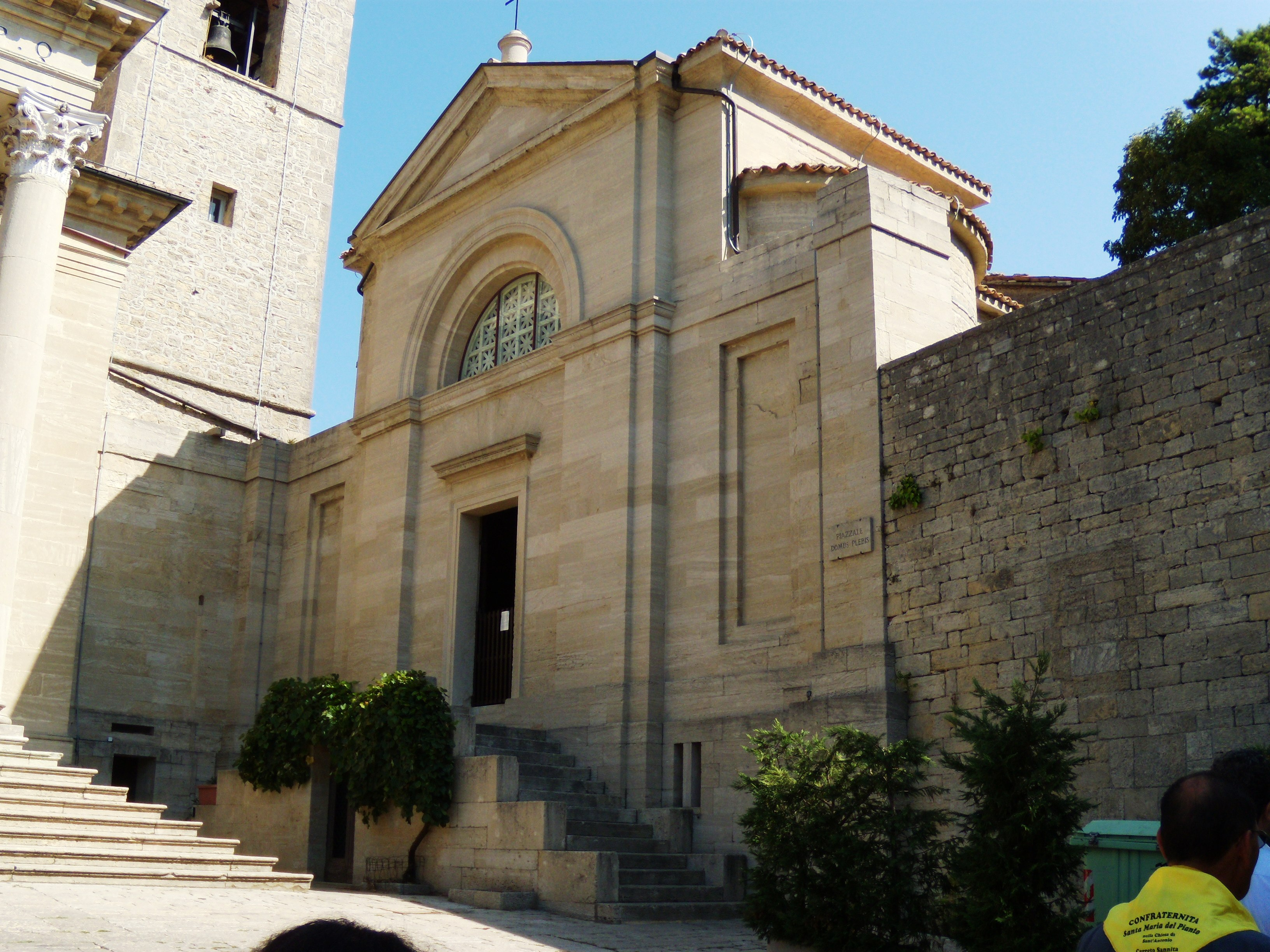

Chiesa di San Pietro (San Marino) is a church in San Marino. It belongs to the Roman Catholic Diocese of San Marino-Montefeltro. It was founded in 1689, preserves a valuable inlaid marble altar donated by Roman musician Antonio Tedeschi in 1689 that is surmounted by a statue dedicated to St. Peter by Enrico Saroldi. In the crypt of this small church are visible two niches that according to tradition were the beds of St. Marino and St. Leo. In 1849 Garibaldi and Anita took refuge in the church as they fled after the fall of the Roman Republic. Inside is a monument dedicated to Pope John XXIII erected by the government from the republic.
