= Crispino Agostinucci (bishop) =

Italian bishop

Crispino Agostinucci (October 25, 1797 – 1856) was an Italian Roman Catholic bishop. Born in Urbino, he was appointed as Bishop of Montefeltro on November 5, 1849, a position he held until his death in 1856. On February 5, 1838, the Basilica di San Marino was solemnly inaugurated by Agostinucci and the Captain's-Regent. He had obtained a doctorate in sacred theology.
