= Chiesa di Sant'Andrea (Serravalle) =

Church in San Marino

Coordinates: 43°58′8.8″N 12°28′43.3″E

- Chiesa di Sant'Andrea
- Denomination: Catholic

Architecture
- Years built: 1824-1914

Administration
- Diocese: San Marino-Montefeltro

Chiesa di Sant'Andrea (Serravalle) is a church located in Serravalle, San Marino.

The church, now dedicated to St. Andrew and the Virgin Mary, is part of the Roman Catholic Diocese of San Marino-Montefeltro.

The church is first mentioned in papal bull by Lucius II. Construction of the current church building started in 1824 over the ancient walls of the city on the site of the old chapel dedicated to the Virgin Mary. A 15th century fresco of the Virgin Mary by Antonello da Serravalle which was restored in the early 20th century is found in the apse.

Construction of the church finished in 1914 and it was restored in 1973 under the direction of architect Luigi Fonti of Rimini.
