= Oratorio di San Rocco, Cailungo =

Church in San Marino

Coordinates: 43°56′55.3″N 12°27′7.2″E

The Oratorio di San Rocco is a church in San Marino. It belongs to the Roman Catholic Diocese of San Marino-Montefeltro. It was built after the plague in honor of St Rocco. The interior has an oil on canvas painting of the Madonna and Child enthroned with Saints Rocco, Marino and John the Baptist.
