= Sant'Andrea, Acquaviva =

Catholic church in San Marino

Coordinates: 43°56′34.4″N 12°24′56.5″E

Chiesa di Sant'Andrea (Acquaviva) is a church in San Marino. It belongs to the Roman Catholic Diocese of San Marino-Montefeltro.
