= Sant'Andrea in Via Flaminia =

Church in Rome, Italy

Sant'Andrea in Via Flaminia Saint Andrew in Via Flaminia (in English)
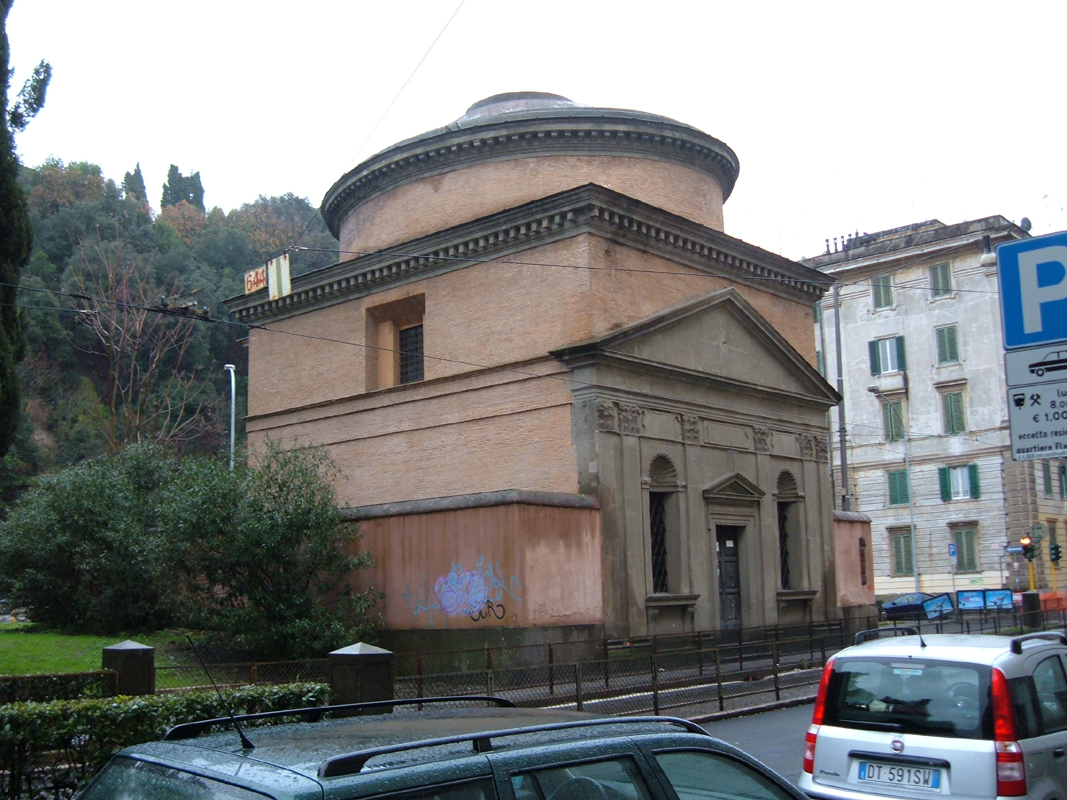
- Façade of Sant'Andrea del Vignola.

Religion
- Affiliation: Roman Catholic

Location
- Location: Rome, Italy
- Interactive map of Sant'Andrea in Via Flaminia; Saint Andrew in Via Flaminia (in English)
- Coordinates: 41°55′16″N 12°28′19″E

Architecture
- Architect: Giacomo Barozzi da Vignola
- Type: Church
- Style: Renaissance
- Groundbreaking: 1550
- Completed: 1554

Specifications
- Direction of façade: SW
- Length: 13 metres (43 ft)
- Width: 10 metres (33 ft)

Sant'Andrea in Via Flaminia (English: Saint Andrew on Via Flaminia) is a Roman Catholic church dedicated to St Andrew the Apostle in Rome, Italy. The edifice is also known as Sant'Andrea del Vignola, after its architect Giacomo Barozzi da Vignola.

== History ==
It was commissioned by Pope Julius III, in completion of a vow relative to his escape following the Sack of Rome, 1527. The small church on the Via Flaminia, scarcely more than a chapel, was designed by Giacomo Barozzi da Vignola in 1552 and completed the following year, while Vignola was also employed by Julius nearby at the Villa Giulia.

Sant'Andrea was the first church with an elliptical dome and the first step toward the Baroque world of elliptical forms.

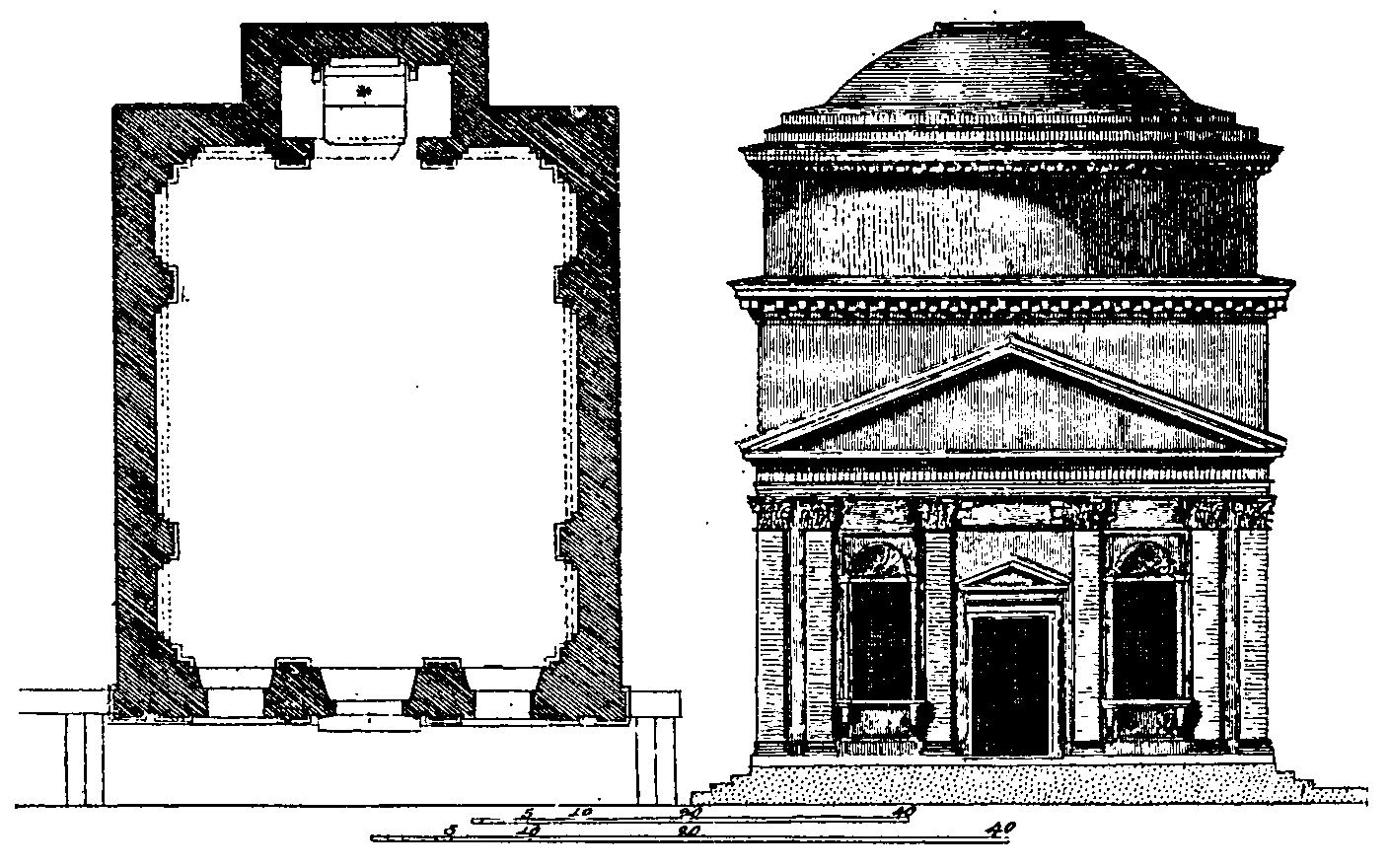
Floor plan, front elevation.

The interior space is vividly expressed on the exterior. The tempio as it was long called, is an unadorned cube with a dentilled cornice without a frieze, surmounted by an elliptical low dome masked by a high plain drum with a comparable frieze, all in the gray pietra serena more usual to Tuscany than Rome. Applied to the street front is an extremely flat pedimented temple front, whose unadorned frieze is continued alone round the sides of the building, dividing the cube in the proportions 2:3. Very flat Corinthian pilasters, doubled at the corners, divide the applied facade in three bays, with shell-headed niches flanking the door. The façade is divided into pilaster strips with a central portal open between two grated windows.

== Interior ==
Inside there are frescoes by Girolamo Siciolante da Sermoneta and Pellegrino Tibaldi.

Julius had the church engraved, plan, elevation and in perspective (G. Vasi 1761). After being long neglected, the unadorned geometry of the structure began to have an appeal to the popular Neoclassical style. The church was refurbished by the neoclassic architect Giuseppe Valadier, during the Napoleonic occupation of Rome, 1805.

== See also ==
- 16th-century Western domes
