= 2013–14 UEFA Europa League qualifying =

Union of European Football Association competition

The qualifying phase of the 2013–14 UEFA Europa League was played from 2 July to 8 August, to define 29 entrants in the competition's play-off round, who would then in turn compete for a place in the group stage.

All times were CEST (UTC+2).

== Round and draw dates ==
All draws were held at UEFA headquarters in Nyon, Switzerland.

| Round | Draw date and time | First leg | Second leg |
|---|---|---|---|
| First qualifying round | 24 June 2013, 13:00 & 14:30 | 4 July 2013 | 11 July 2013 |
| Second qualifying round | 24 June 2013, 13:00 & 14:30 | 18 July 2013 | 25 July 2013 |
| Third qualifying round | 19 July 2013, 13:00 | 1 August 2013 | 8 August 2013 |
| Play-off round | 9 August 2013, 13:00 | 22 August 2013 | 29 August 2013 |

Matches might have been played on Tuesdays or Wednesdays instead of the regular Thursdays due to scheduling conflicts.

== Format ==
In the qualifying phase and play-off round, each tie was played over two legs, with each team playing one leg at home. The team that scored more goals on aggregate over the two legs advanced to the next round. If the aggregate score was level, the away goals rule was applied, i.e., the team that scored more goals away from home over the two legs advanced. If away goals were also equal, then thirty minutes of extra time was played. The away goals rule was again applied after extra time, i.e., if there were goals scored during extra time and the aggregate score was still level, the visiting team advanced by virtue of more away goals scored. If no goals were scored during extra time, the tie was decided by penalty shoot-out.

In the draws for each round, teams were seeded based on their UEFA club coefficients at the beginning of the season, with the teams divided into seeded and unseeded pots. A seeded team was drawn against an unseeded team, with the order of legs in each tie decided randomly. Due to the limited time between matches, the draws for the second and third qualifying rounds took place before the results of the previous round were known. For these draws (or in any cases where the result of a tie in the previous round was not known at the time of the draw), the seeding was carried out under the assumption that the team with the higher coefficient of an undecided tie advanced to this round, which means if the team with the lower coefficient was to advance, it simply took the seeding of its defeated opponent. Prior to the draws, UEFA may form "groups" in accordance with the principles set by the Club Competitions Committee, but they were purely for convenience of the draw and for ensuring that teams from the same association were not drawn against each other, and did not resemble any real groupings in the sense of the competition.

== Teams ==
A total of 169 teams were involved in the qualifying phase and play-off round (including 15 losers of the Champions League third qualifying round which entered the play-off round). The 31 winners of the play-off round advanced to the group stage to join the 7 automatic qualifiers and 10 losers of the Champions League play-off round.

Below were the participating teams (with their 2013 UEFA club coefficients), grouped by their starting rounds.

Key to colours
Winners of the play-off round (and lucky losers) advanced to the group stage

Play-off round
| Team | Coeff |
|---|---|
| (England) Tottenham Hotspur | 69.592 |
| (Ukraine) Dynamo Kyiv | 68.951 |
| (Portugal) Braga | 62.833 |
| (Italy) Fiorentina | 42.829 |
| (Russia) Spartak Moscow | 40.766 |
| (Netherlands) AZ | 39.445 |
| (Cyprus) APOEL | 35.366 |
| (Turkey) Beşiktaş | 34.900 |
| (Greece) PAOK | 28.800 |
| (Austria) Red Bull Salzburg | 28.075 |
| (Belgium) Genk | 26.880 |
| (Ukraine) Dnipro Dnipropetrovsk | 23.951 |
| (Spain) Real Betis | 17.605 |
| (Serbia) Partizan | 17.425 |
| (Germany) Eintracht Frankfurt | 15.922 |
| (Netherlands) Feyenoord | 13.945 |
| (Denmark) Nordsjælland | 12.640 |
| (France) Nice | 11.800 |
| (Moldova) Sheriff Tiraspol | 11.533 |
| (Greece) Atromitos | 8.300 |
| (Sweden) IF Elfsborg | 8.125 |
| (Israel) Maccabi Tel Aviv | 8.075 |
| (Norway) Molde | 7.835 |
| (Switzerland) Grasshopper | 7.285 |
| (Belgium) Zulte Waregem | 6.880 |
| (Cyprus) Apollon Limassol | 6.366 |
| (Switzerland) St. Gallen | 5.785 |
| (Georgia (country)) Dinamo Tbilisi | 5.333 |
| (Denmark) Esbjerg | 5.140 |
| (Austria) Pasching | 5.075 |
| (Iceland) FH | 4.083 |
| (Albania) Skënderbeu | 2.833 |
| (Estonia) Nõmme Kalju | 1.191 |

Third qualifying round
| Team | Coeff |
|---|---|
| (Germany) VfB Stuttgart | 59.922 |
| (Spain) Sevilla | 55.105 |
| (Italy) Udinese | 42.829 |
| (Belgium) Club Brugge | 36.880 |
| (France) Saint-Étienne | 26.800 |
| (Switzerland) Zürich | 16.785 |
| (England) Swansea City | 16.592 |
| (Turkey) Bursaspor | 14.900 |
| (Austria) Rapid Wien | 13.075 |
| (Ukraine) Metalurh Donetsk | 12.451 |
| (Portugal) Estoril | 11.833 |
| (Netherlands) Vitesse | 9.945 |
| (Russia) Kuban Krasnodar | 9.266 |
| (Greece) Asteras Tripolis | 7.800 |
| (Denmark) Randers | 7.140 |
| (Scotland) Motherwell | 7.038 |
| (Czech Republic) Jablonec | 6.745 |
| (Israel) Hapoel Ramat Gan | 4.575 |

Second qualifying round
| Team | Coeff |
|---|---|
| (Russia) Rubin Kazan | 58.266 |
| (Belgium) Standard Liège | 45.880 |
| (Israel) Hapoel Tel Aviv | 29.575 |
| (Czech Republic) Sparta Prague | 29.245 |
| (Poland) Lech Poznań | 23.650 |
| (Turkey) Trabzonspor | 21.400 |
| (Denmark) AaB | 19.640 |
| (Cyprus) Anorthosis Famagusta | 17.366 |
| (Netherlands) Utrecht | 13.945 |
| (Israel) Maccabi Haifa | 13.575 |
| (Austria) Sturm Graz | 11.575 |
| (Cyprus) Omonia | 10.366 |
| (Ukraine) Chornomorets Odesa | 9.951 |
| (Hungary) Debrecen | 9.850 |
| (Croatia) Hajduk Split | 8.916 |
| (Serbia) Red Star Belgrade | 8.425 |
| (Czech Republic) Slovan Liberec | 7.745 |
| (Switzerland) Thun | 7.285 |
| (Poland) Śląsk Wrocław | 7.150 |
| (Greece) Skoda Xanthi | 6.800 |
| (Belarus) Shakhtyor Soligorsk | 5.175 |
| (Sweden) IFK Göteborg | 5.125 |
| (Croatia) Rijeka | 4.916 |
| (Belarus) Minsk | 4.675 |
| (Romania) Petrolul Ploiești | 4.604 |
| (Romania) Pandurii Târgu Jiu | 4.604 |
| (Slovakia) Senica | 4.341 |
| (Poland) Piast Gliwice | 4.150 |
| (Sweden) BK Häcken | 4.125 |
| (Scotland) Hibernian | 4.038 |
| (Croatia) Lokomotiva Zagreb | 3.916 |
| (Norway) Strømsgodset | 3.835 |
| (Finland) Honka | 3.701 |
| (Slovenia) Olimpija Ljubljana | 3.691 |
| (Scotland) St Johnstone | 3.538 |
| (Bulgaria) Beroe Stara Zagora | 3.450 |
| (Georgia (country)) Dila Gori | 3.333 |
| (Bosnia and Herzegovina) Široki Brijeg | 3.316 |
| (Serbia) Jagodina | 3.175 |
| (Slovakia) Trenčín | 2.841 |
| (Norway) Hødd | 2.835 |
| (Republic of Ireland) Derry City | 2.475 |

First qualifying round
| Team | Coeff |
|---|---|
| (Norway) Rosenborg | 16.835 |
| (Slovakia) Žilina | 15.841 |
| (Bulgaria) Levski Sofia | 11.950 |
| (Hungary) Videoton | 7.850 |
| (Latvia) Ventspils | 6.658 |
| (Norway) Tromsø | 6.335 |
| (Kazakhstan) Aktobe | 6.191 |
| (Belarus) Dinamo Minsk | 6.175 |
| (Republic of Ireland) St Patrick's Athletic | 5.975 |
| (Azerbaijan) Qarabağ | 5.708 |
| (Serbia) Vojvodina | 5.425 |
| (Sweden) Malmö FF | 5.125 |
| (Bosnia and Herzegovina) Sarajevo | 5.066 |
| (Romania) Astra Giurgiu | 4.604 |
| (Iceland) KR | 4.583 |
| (Luxembourg) F91 Dudelange | 4.425 |
| (Finland) Inter Turku | 4.201 |
| (Moldova) Dacia Chișinău | 4.033 |
| (Estonia) Levadia Tallinn | 3.941 |
| (Northern Ireland) Linfield | 3.866 |
| (Hungary) Honvéd | 3.850 |
| (Malta) Valletta | 3.791 |
| (Luxembourg) Differdange 03 | 3.675 |
| (Latvia) Liepājas Metalurgs | 3.658 |
| (Sweden) Gefle IF | 3.625 |
| (Armenia) Pyunik | 3.600 |
| (Bosnia and Herzegovina) Zrinjski Mostar | 3.566 |
| (Azerbaijan) Inter Baku | 3.458 |
| (Latvia) Skonto | 3.408 |
| (Lithuania) Sūduva | 3.300 |
| (Liechtenstein) Vaduz | 3.200 |
| (Estonia) Flora | 3.191 |
| (Azerbaijan) Khazar Lankaran | 2.958 |
| (Faroe Islands) HB | 2.816 |
| (Montenegro) Rudar Pljevlja | 2.800 |
| (Finland) TPS | 2.701 |
| (Iceland) Breiðablik | 2.583 |
| (Bulgaria) Botev Plovdiv | 2.450 |
| (Slovenia) Domžale | 2.441 |
| (Northern Ireland) Glentoran | 2.366 |
| (North Macedonia) Metalurg Skopje | 2.300 |
| (Moldova) Milsami Orhei | 2.283 |
| (Slovenia) Celje | 2.191 |
| (Georgia (country)) Torpedo Kutaisi | 2.083 |
| (North Macedonia) Teteks | 2.050 |
| (Kazakhstan) Irtysh | 1.941 |
| (Luxembourg) Jeunesse Esch | 1.925 |
| (Northern Ireland) Crusaders | 1.866 |
| (Andorra) FC Santa Coloma | 1.850 |
| (Georgia (country)) Chikhura Sachkhere | 1.833 |
| (Lithuania) Žalgiris | 1.800 |
| (Finland) Mariehamn | 1.701 |
| (Armenia) Mika | 1.600 |
| (Iceland) ÍBV | 1.583 |
| (Montenegro) Čelik Nikšić | 1.550 |
| (Malta) Hibernians | 1.541 |
| (Malta) Sliema Wanderers | 1.541 |
| (Moldova) Tiraspol | 1.533 |
| (Republic of Ireland) Drogheda United | 1.475 |
| (Estonia) Narva Trans | 1.441 |
| (Armenia) Gandzasar Kapan | 1.350 |
| (Lithuania) Kruoja Pakruojis | 1.300 |
| (Kazakhstan) Astana | 1.191 |
| (Albania) Teuta | 1.083 |
| (Albania) Laçi | 1.083 |
| (Faroe Islands) Víkingur Gøta | 1.066 |
| (Montenegro) Mladost Podgorica | 1.050 |
| (North Macedonia) Turnovo | 1.050 |
| (Andorra) UE Santa Coloma | 0.850 |
| (Albania) Kukësi | 0.833 |
| (Faroe Islands) ÍF | 0.566 |
| (Wales) Prestatyn Town | 0.516 |
| (Wales) Airbus UK Broughton | 0.516 |
| (Wales) Bala Town | 0.516 |
| (San Marino) La Fiorita | 0.383 |
| (San Marino) Libertas | 0.383 |

Notes

1. ^{CL-CR} Losers of the Champions League third qualifying round (Champions Route).
2. ^{CL-LR} Losers of the Champions League third qualifying round (League Route).
3. ^{†} On 25 June 2013, Fenerbahçe were banned by UEFA from the 2013–14 UEFA club competitions because of the 2011 Turkish sports corruption scandal. They appealed the ban to the Court of Arbitration for Sport, and on 18 July 2013 it was ruled that the ban should be temporarily lifted and they should be included in the qualifying round draws of the Champions League, until the final decision to be made before the end of August 2013. Fenerbahçe competed in the Champions League qualifying rounds and lost in the play-off round. On 28 August 2013, the Court of Arbitration for Sport upheld UEFA's ban, meaning Fenerbahçe were banned from the 2013–14 UEFA Europa League. A draw was held on 30 August 2013, 09:00, in Monaco, to select a team to replace Fenerbahçe in the Europa League group stage among the teams eliminated in the play-off round, and was won by APOEL.
4. ^{‡} On 25 June 2013, Beşiktaş were banned by UEFA from the 2013–14 UEFA club competitions because of the 2011 Turkish sports corruption scandal. They appealed the ban to the Court of Arbitration for Sport, and on 18 July 2013 it was ruled that the ban should be temporarily lifted and they should be included in the qualifying round draws of the Europa League, until the final decision to be made before the end of August 2013. Beşiktaş competed in the Europa League play-off round and won. On 30 August 2013, the Court of Arbitration for Sport upheld UEFA's ban, meaning Beşiktaş were banned from the 2013–14 UEFA Europa League. UEFA decided to replace Beşiktaş in the Europa League group stage with Tromsø, who were eliminated by Beşiktaş in the play-off round.
5. ^{&} On 14 August 2013, Metalist Kharkiv were disqualified from the 2013–14 UEFA club competitions because of previous match-fixing. UEFA decided to replace Metalist Kharkiv in the Champions League play-off round with PAOK, who were eliminated by Metalist Kharkiv in the third qualifying round. Thus, Maccabi Tel Aviv, the opponent of PAOK in the Europa League play-off round, qualified directly for the Europa League group stage. PAOK also qualified for the Europa League group stage after losing in the Champions League play-off round.

== First qualifying round ==
=== Seeding ===
A total of 76 teams played in the first qualifying round. The draw was held on 24 June 2013.

| Group 1 | | Group 2 | | Group 3 | | Group 4 | |
| Seeded | Unseeded | Seeded | Unseeded | Seeded | Unseeded | Seeded | Unseeded |
|---|---|---|---|---|---|---|---|
| (Latvia) Ventspils (Republic of Ireland) St Patrick's Athletic (Iceland) KR (Finland) Inter Turku (Sweden) Gefle IF | (Northern Ireland) Glentoran (Lithuania) Žalgiris (Estonia) Narva Trans (Faroe Islands) Víkingur Gøta (Wales) Airbus UK Broughton | (Hungary) Videoton (Azerbaijan) Qarabağ (Luxembourg) F91 Dudelange (Liechtenstein) Vaduz (Estonia) Flora | (North Macedonia) Metalurg Skopje (Moldova) Milsami Orhei (Georgia (country)) Chikhura Sachkhere (Montenegro) Mladost Podgorica (Albania) Kukësi | (Bulgaria) Levski Sofia (Bosnia and Herzegovina) Sarajevo (Moldova) Dacia Chișinău (Armenia) Pyunik (Azerbaijan) Khazar Lankaran | (North Macedonia) Teteks (Kazakhstan) Irtysh (Malta) Sliema Wanderers (Albania) Teuta (San Marino) Libertas | (Bulgaria) Botev Plovdiv (Serbia) Vojvodina (Romania) Astra Giurgiu (Bosnia and Herzegovina) Zrinjski Mostar (Montenegro) Rudar Pljevlja | (Slovenia) Domžale (Armenia) Mika (Malta) Hibernians (Kazakhstan) Astana (Andorra) UE Santa Coloma |
| Group 5 | | Group 6 | | Group 7 | | | |
| Seeded | Unseeded | Seeded | Unseeded | Seeded | Unseeded | | |
| (Norway) Tromsø (Sweden) Malmö FF (Northern Ireland) Linfield (Latvia) Liepājas Metalurgs (Azerbaijan) Inter Baku (Iceland) Breiðablik | (Slovenia) Celje (Andorra) FC Santa Coloma (Finland) Mariehamn (Republic of Ireland) Drogheda United (Faroe Islands) ÍF (Wales) Prestatyn Town | (Norway) Rosenborg (Belarus) Dinamo Minsk (Estonia) Levadia Tallinn (Latvia) Skonto (Faroe Islands) HB (Finland) TPS | (Luxembourg) Jeunesse Esch (Northern Ireland) Crusaders (Iceland) ÍBV (Moldova) Tiraspol (Lithuania) Kruoja Pakruojis (Wales) Bala Town | (Slovakia) Žilina (Kazakhstan) Aktobe (Hungary) Honvéd (Malta) Valletta (Luxembourg) Differdange 03 (Lithuania) Sūduva | (Georgia (country)) Torpedo Kutaisi (Montenegro) Čelik Nikšić (Armenia) Gandzasar Kapan (Albania) Laçi (North Macedonia) Turnovo (San Marino) La Fiorita | | |

Notes

1. ^{‡} Bulgaria's third entrant in the Europa League was unconfirmed at the time of the draws for the first and second qualifying rounds. For these draws, UEFA used the coefficient of CSKA Sofia (8.450), the original entrant. After the draw, it was confirmed that the berth was given to Botev Plovdiv.

=== Summary ===
The first legs were played on 2, 3 and 4 July, and the second legs were played on 9, 10 and 11 July 2013.

Inter Turku lodged a protest after losing the second leg to Víkingur Gøta, and two match officials were later banned for life by UEFA for attempted match-fixing.

| Team 1 | Agg. | Team 2 | 1st leg | 2nd leg |
|---|---|---|---|---|
| Víkingur Gøta (Faroe Islands) | 2–1 | (Finland) Inter Turku | 1–1 | 1–0 |
| Žalgiris (Lithuania) | 4–3 | (Republic of Ireland) St Patrick's Athletic | 2–2 | 2–1 |
| Airbus UK Broughton (Wales) | 1–1 (a) | (Latvia) Ventspils | 1–1 | 0–0 |
| Narva Trans (Estonia) | 1–8 | (Sweden) Gefle IF | 0–3 | 1–5 |
| KR (Iceland) | 3–0 | (Northern Ireland) Glentoran | 0–0 | 3–0 |
| Chikhura Sachkhere (Georgia (country)) | 1–1 (a) | (Liechtenstein) Vaduz | 0–0 | 1–1 |
| Milsami Orhei (Moldova) | 1–0 | (Luxembourg) F91 Dudelange | 1–0 | 0–0 |
| Metalurg Skopje (North Macedonia) | 0–2 | (Azerbaijan) Qarabağ | 0–1 | 0–1 |
| Videoton (Hungary) | 2–2 (a) (Note: Order of legs reversed after original draw.) | (Montenegro) Mladost Podgorica | 2–1 | 0–1 |
| Flora (Estonia) | 1–1 (a) | (Albania) Kukësi | 1–1 | 0–0 |
| Teteks (North Macedonia) | 1–2 | (Armenia) Pyunik | 1–1 | 0–1 |
| Teuta (Albania) | 3–3 (a) | (Moldova) Dacia Chișinău | 3–1 | 0–2 |
| Sarajevo (Bosnia and Herzegovina) | 3–1 | (San Marino) Libertas | 1–0 | 2–1 |
| Sliema Wanderers (Malta) | 1–2 | (Azerbaijan) Khazar Lankaran | 1–1 | 0–1 |
| Levski Sofia (Bulgaria) | 0–2 | (Kazakhstan) Irtysh | 0–0 | 0–2 |
| Hibernians (Malta) | 3–7 | (Serbia) Vojvodina | 1–4 | 2–3 |
| Astana (Kazakhstan) | 0–6 | (Bulgaria) Botev Plovdiv | 0–1 | 0–5 |
| UE Santa Coloma (Andorra) | 1–4 | (Bosnia and Herzegovina) Zrinjski Mostar | 1–3 | 0–1 |
| Domžale (Slovenia) | 0–3 | (Romania) Astra Giurgiu | 0–1 | 0–2 |
| Rudar Pljevlja (Montenegro) | 2–1 | (Armenia) Mika | 1–0 | 1–1 |
| Breiðablik (Iceland) | 4–0 | (Andorra) FC Santa Coloma | 4–0 | 0–0 |
| Drogheda United (Republic of Ireland) | 0–2 | (Sweden) Malmö FF | 0–0 | 0–2 |
| Inter Baku (Azerbaijan) | 3–1 | (Finland) Mariehamn | 1–1 | 2–0 |
| ÍF (Faroe Islands) | 0–5 | (Northern Ireland) Linfield | 0–2 | 0–3 |
| Prestatyn Town (Wales) | 3–3 (4–3 p) | (Latvia) Liepājas Metalurgs | 1–2 | 2–1 (a.e.t.) |
| Tromsø (Norway) | 3–2 | (Slovenia) Celje | 1–2 | 2–0 |
| Tiraspol (Moldova) | 1–1 (2–4 p) | (Latvia) Skonto | 0–1 | 1–0 (a.e.t.) |
| Crusaders (Northern Ireland) | 3–9 | (Norway) Rosenborg | 1–2 | 2–7 |
| ÍBV (Iceland) | 2–1 | (Faroe Islands) HB | 1–1 | 1–0 |
| Jeunesse Esch (Luxembourg) | 3–2 | (Finland) TPS | 2–0 | 1–2 |
| Bala Town (Wales) | 2–3 | (Estonia) Levadia Tallinn | 1–0 | 1–3 |
| Kruoja Pakruojis (Lithuania) | 0–8 | (Belarus) Dinamo Minsk | 0–3 | 0–5 |
| La Fiorita (San Marino) | 0–4 | (Malta) Valletta | 0–3 | 0–1 |
| Laçi (Albania) | 1–3 | (Luxembourg) Differdange 03 | 0–1 | 1–2 |
| Gandzasar Kapan (Armenia) | 2–4 | (Kazakhstan) Aktobe | 1–2 | 1–2 |
| Čelik Nikšić (Montenegro) | 1–13 | (Hungary) Honvéd | 1–4 | 0–9 |
| Torpedo Kutaisi (Georgia (country)) | 3–6 | (Slovakia) Žilina | 0–3 | 3–3 |
| Sūduva (Lithuania) | 4–4 (4–5 p) | (North Macedonia) Turnovo | 2–2 | 2–2 (a.e.t.) |

== Second qualifying round ==
=== Seeding ===
A total of 80 teams played in the second qualifying round: 42 teams which entered in this round, and the 38 winners of the first qualifying round. The draw was held on 24 June 2013.

| Group 1 | | Group 2 | | Group 3 | | Group 4 | |
| Seeded | Unseeded | Seeded | Unseeded | Seeded | Unseeded | Seeded | Unseeded |
|---|---|---|---|---|---|---|---|
| (Czech Republic) Sparta Prague (Switzerland) Thun (Greece) Skoda Xanthi (Kazakhstan) Aktobe (Bosnia and Herzegovina) Sarajevo | (Sweden) BK Häcken (Northern Ireland) Linfield (Georgia (country)) Chikhura Sachkhere (Albania) Kukësi (Norway) Hødd | (Denmark) AaB (Israel) Maccabi Haifa (Cyprus) Omonia (Croatia) Hajduk Split (Latvia) Ventspils | (Romania) Astra Giurgiu (Georgia (country)) Dila Gori (North Macedonia) Turnovo (Azerbaijan) Khazar Lankaran (Luxembourg) Jeunesse Esch | (Russia) Rubin Kazan (Czech Republic) Slovan Liberec (Poland) Śląsk Wrocław (Sweden) Malmö FF (Romania) Pandurii Târgu Jiu | (Scotland) Hibernian (Estonia) Levadia Tallinn (Latvia) Skonto (Serbia) Jagodina (Montenegro) Rudar Pljevlja | (Israel) Hapoel Tel Aviv (Hungary) Debrecen (Lithuania) Žalgiris (Croatia) Rijeka (Romania) Petrolul Ploiești | (Faroe Islands) Víkingur Gøta (Norway) Strømsgodset (Wales) Prestatyn Town (Armenia) Pyunik (Bulgaria) Beroe Stara Zagora |
| Group 5 | | Group 6 | | Group 7 | | Group 8 | |
| Seeded | Unseeded | Seeded | Unseeded | Seeded | Unseeded | Seeded | Unseeded |
| (Poland) Lech Poznań (Slovakia) Žilina (Serbia) Red Star Belgrade (Serbia) Vojvodina (Belarus) Shakhtyor Soligorsk | (Moldova) Milsami Orhei (Hungary) Honvéd (Finland) Honka (Slovenia) Olimpija Ljubljana (Iceland) ÍBV | (Belgium) Standard Liège (Ukraine) Chornomorets Odesa (Norway) Tromsø (Belarus) Dinamo Minsk (Sweden) IFK Göteborg | (Iceland) KR (Moldova) Dacia Chișinău (Croatia) Lokomotiva Zagreb (Azerbaijan) Inter Baku (Slovakia) Trenčín | (Turkey) Trabzonspor (Norway) Rosenborg (Bulgaria) Botev Plovdiv (Azerbaijan) Qarabağ (Belarus) Minsk | (Poland) Piast Gliwice (Malta) Valletta (Bosnia and Herzegovina) Zrinjski Mostar (Scotland) St Johnstone (Republic of Ireland) Derry City | (Cyprus) Anorthosis Famagusta (Netherlands) Utrecht (Kazakhstan) Irtysh (Austria) Sturm Graz (Montenegro) Mladost Podgorica | (Slovakia) Senica (Luxembourg) Differdange 03 (Sweden) Gefle IF (Bosnia and Herzegovina) Široki Brijeg (Iceland) Breiðablik |

Notes

1. ^{†} Winners of the first qualifying round whose identity was not known at the time of the draw. Teams in italics defeated a team with a higher coefficient in the first qualifying round, thus effectively taking the coefficient of their defeated opponent in the draw for the second qualifying round.
2. ^{‡} Bulgaria's third entrant in the Europa League was unconfirmed at the time of the draws for the first and second qualifying rounds. For these draws, UEFA used the coefficient of CSKA Sofia (8.450), the original entrant. After the draw, it was confirmed that the berth was given to Botev Plovdiv.

=== Summary ===
The first legs were played on 16 and 18 July, and the second legs were played on 25 July 2013.

| Team 1 | Agg. | Team 2 | 1st leg | 2nd leg |
|---|---|---|---|---|
| Sparta Prague (Czech Republic) | 2–3 (Note: Order of legs reversed after original draw.) | (Sweden) BK Häcken | 2–2 | 0–1 |
| Kukësi (Albania) | 3–2 | (Bosnia and Herzegovina) Sarajevo | 3–2 | 0–0 |
| Thun (Switzerland) | 5–1 | (Georgia (country)) Chikhura Sachkhere | 2–0 | 3–1 |
| Skoda Xanthi (Greece) | 2–2 (a) | (Northern Ireland) Linfield | 0–1 | 2–1 (a.e.t.) |
| Hødd (Norway) | 1–2 | (Kazakhstan) Aktobe | 1–0 | 0–2 |
| Dila Gori (Georgia (country)) | 3–0 | (Denmark) AaB | 3–0 | 0–0 |
| Maccabi Haifa (Israel) | 10–0 | (Azerbaijan) Khazar Lankaran | 2–0 | 8–0 |
| Hajduk Split (Croatia) | 3–2 | (North Macedonia) Turnovo | 2–1 | 1–1 |
| Ventspils (Latvia) | 5–1 | (Luxembourg) Jeunesse Esch | 1–0 | 4–1 |
| Astra Giurgiu (Romania) | 3–2 | (Cyprus) Omonia | 1–1 | 2–1 |
| Skonto (Latvia) | 2–2 (a) | (Czech Republic) Slovan Liberec | 2–1 | 0–1 |
| Levadia Tallinn (Estonia) | 0–4 | (Romania) Pandurii Târgu Jiu | 0–0 | 0–4 |
| Śląsk Wrocław (Poland) | 6–2 | (Montenegro) Rudar Pljevlja | 4–0 | 2–2 |
| Malmö FF (Sweden) | 9–0 | (Scotland) Hibernian | 2–0 | 7–0 |
| Jagodina (Serbia) | 2–4 | (Russia) Rubin Kazan | 2–3 | 0–1 |
| Strømsgodset (Norway) | 5–2 | (Hungary) Debrecen | 2–2 | 3–0 |
| Petrolul Ploiești (Romania) | 7–0 | (Faroe Islands) Víkingur Gøta | 3–0 | 4–0 |
| Rijeka (Croatia) | 8–0 | (Wales) Prestatyn Town | 5–0 | 3–0 |
| Žalgiris (Lithuania) | 3–1 | (Armenia) Pyunik | 2–0 | 1–1 |
| Beroe Stara Zagora (Bulgaria) | 3–6 | (Israel) Hapoel Tel Aviv | 1–4 | 2–2 |
| Honka (Finland) | 2–5 | (Poland) Lech Poznań | 1–3 | 1–2 |
| Red Star Belgrade (Serbia) | 2–0 | (Iceland) ÍBV | 2–0 | 0–0 |
| Shakhtyor Soligorsk (Belarus) | 2–2 (2–4 p) | (Moldova) Milsami Orhei | 1–1 | 1–1 (a.e.t.) |
| Vojvodina (Serbia) | 5–1 | (Hungary) Honvéd | 2–0 | 3–1 |
| Olimpija Ljubljana (Slovenia) | 3–3 (a) | (Slovakia) Žilina | 3–1 | 0–2 |
| Tromsø (Norway) | 2–1 | (Azerbaijan) Inter Baku | 2–0 | 0–1 |
| Chornomorets Odesa (Ukraine) | 3–2 | (Moldova) Dacia Chișinău | 2–0 | 1–2 |
| IFK Göteborg (Sweden) | 1–2 | (Slovakia) Trenčín | 0–0 | 1–2 |
| Dinamo Minsk (Belarus) | 4–4 (a) | (Croatia) Lokomotiva Zagreb | 1–2 | 3–2 |
| KR (Iceland) | 2–6 | (Belgium) Standard Liège | 1–3 | 1–3 |
| Zrinjski Mostar (Bosnia and Herzegovina) | 1–3 | (Bulgaria) Botev Plovdiv | 1–1 | 0–2 |
| Qarabağ (Azerbaijan) | 4–3 | (Poland) Piast Gliwice | 2–1 | 2–2 (a.e.t.) |
| Rosenborg (Norway) | 1–2 | (Scotland) St Johnstone | 0–1 | 1–1 |
| Trabzonspor (Turkey) | 7–2 | (Republic of Ireland) Derry City | 4–2 | 3–0 |
| Valletta (Malta) | 1–3 | (Belarus) Minsk | 1–1 | 0–2 |
| Mladost Podgorica (Montenegro) | 3–2 | (Slovakia) Senica | 2–2 | 1–0 |
| Anorthosis Famagusta (Cyprus) | 3–4 | (Sweden) Gefle IF | 3–0 | 0–4 |
| Breiðablik (Iceland) | 1–0 | (Austria) Sturm Graz | 0–0 | 1–0 |
| Irtysh (Kazakhstan) | 3–4 | (Bosnia and Herzegovina) Široki Brijeg | 3–2 | 0–2 |
| Differdange 03 (Luxembourg) | 5–4 | (Netherlands) Utrecht | 2–1 | 3–3 |

== Third qualifying round ==
=== Seeding ===
A total of 58 teams played in the third qualifying round: 18 teams which entered in this round, and the 40 winners of the second qualifying round. The draw was held on 19 July 2013.

| Group 1 | | Group 2 | | Group 3 | |
| Seeded | Unseeded | Seeded | Unseeded | Seeded | Unseeded |
|---|---|---|---|---|---|
| (Italy) Udinese (Belgium) Club Brugge (Turkey) Trabzonspor (Israel) Maccabi Haifa (Romania) Astra Giurgiu (Ukraine) Chornomorets Odesa | (Serbia) Red Star Belgrade (Poland) Śląsk Wrocław (Latvia) Ventspils (Belarus) Dinamo Minsk (Slovakia) Trenčín (Bosnia and Herzegovina) Široki Brijeg | (Russia) Rubin Kazan (Poland) Lech Poznań (Switzerland) Zürich (England) Swansea City (Iceland) Breiðablik (Netherlands) Vitesse | (Czech Republic) Slovan Liberec (Denmark) Randers (Kazakhstan) Aktobe (Sweden) Malmö FF (Romania) Petrolul Ploiești (Lithuania) Žalgiris | (Spain) Sevilla (Israel) Hapoel Tel Aviv (Georgia (country)) Dila Gori (Luxembourg) Differdange 03 (Ukraine) Metalurh Donetsk (Russia) Kuban Krasnodar | (Croatia) Hajduk Split (Scotland) Motherwell (Norway) Tromsø (Albania) Kukësi (Romania) Pandurii Târgu Jiu (Montenegro) Mladost Podgorica |
| Group 4 | | Group 5 | | | |
| Seeded | Unseeded | Seeded | Unseeded | | |
| (Germany) VfB Stuttgart (France) Saint-Étienne (Sweden) Gefle IF (Slovakia) Žilina (Austria) Rapid Wien (Norway) Strømsgodset | (Greece) Asteras Tripolis (Czech Republic) Jablonec (Azerbaijan) Qarabağ (Moldova) Milsami Orhei (Croatia) Rijeka (Bulgaria) Botev Plovdiv | (Belgium) Standard Liège (Sweden) BK Häcken (Scotland) St Johnstone (Turkey) Bursaspor (Portugal) Estoril | (Switzerland) Thun (Greece) Skoda Xanthi (Serbia) Vojvodina (Belarus) Minsk (Israel) Hapoel Ramat Gan | | |

Notes

1. ^{†} Winners of the second qualifying round whose identity was not known at the time of the draw. Teams in italics defeated a team with a higher coefficient in the second qualifying round, thus effectively taking the coefficient of their defeated opponent in the draw for the third qualifying round.

=== Summary ===
The first legs were played on 1 August, and the second legs were played on 8 August 2013.

| Team 1 | Agg. | Team 2 | 1st leg | 2nd leg |
|---|---|---|---|---|
| Chornomorets Odesa (Ukraine) | 3–1 | (Serbia) Red Star Belgrade | 3–1 | 0–0 |
| Široki Brijeg (Bosnia and Herzegovina) | 1–7 | (Italy) Udinese | 1–3 | 0–4 |
| Ventspils (Latvia) | 0–3 | (Israel) Maccabi Haifa | 0–0 | 0–3 |
| Dinamo Minsk (Belarus) | 0–1 | (Turkey) Trabzonspor | 0–1 | 0–0 |
| Śląsk Wrocław (Poland) | 4–3 | (Belgium) Club Brugge | 1–0 | 3–3 |
| Trenčín (Slovakia) | 3–5 | (Romania) Astra Giurgiu | 1–3 | 2–2 |
| Swansea City (England) | 4–0 | (Sweden) Malmö FF | 4–0 | 0–0 |
| Petrolul Ploiești (Romania) | 3–2 | (Netherlands) Vitesse | 1–1 | 2–1 |
| Slovan Liberec (Czech Republic) | 4–2 | (Switzerland) Zürich | 2–1 | 2–1 |
| Aktobe (Kazakhstan) | 1–1 (2–1 p) | (Iceland) Breiðablik | 1–0 | 0–1 (a.e.t.) |
| Randers (Denmark) | 1–4 | (Russia) Rubin Kazan | 1–2 | 0–2 |
| Žalgiris (Lithuania) | 2–2 (a) | (Poland) Lech Poznań | 1–0 | 1–2 |
| Sevilla (Spain) | 9–1 | (Montenegro) Mladost Podgorica | 3–0 | 6–1 |
| Hajduk Split (Croatia) | 0–2 | (Georgia (country)) Dila Gori | 0–1 | 0–1 |
| Kukësi (Albania) | 2–1 | (Ukraine) Metalurh Donetsk | 2–0 | 0–1 |
| Pandurii Târgu Jiu (Romania) | 3–2 | (Israel) Hapoel Tel Aviv | 1–1 | 2–1 |
| Tromsø (Norway) | 1–1 (4–3 p) | (Luxembourg) Differdange 03 | 1–0 | 0–1 (a.e.t.) |
| Motherwell (Scotland) | 0–3 | (Russia) Kuban Krasnodar | 0–2 | 0–1 |
| Saint-Étienne (France) | 6–0 | (Moldova) Milsami Orhei | 3–0 | 3–0 |
| Jablonec (Czech Republic) | 5–2 | (Norway) Strømsgodset | 2–1 | 3–1 |
| Qarabağ (Azerbaijan) | 3–0 | (Sweden) Gefle IF | 1–0 | 2–0 |
| Rijeka (Croatia) | 3–2 | (Slovakia) Žilina | 2–1 | 1–1 |
| Asteras Tripolis (Greece) | 2–4 | (Austria) Rapid Wien | 1–1 | 1–3 |
| Botev Plovdiv (Bulgaria) | 1–1 (a) | (Germany) VfB Stuttgart | 1–1 | 0–0 |
| Estoril (Portugal) | 1–0 | (Israel) Hapoel Ramat Gan | 0–0 | 1–0 |
| Vojvodina (Serbia) | 5–2 | (Turkey) Bursaspor | 2–2 | 3–0 |
| Skoda Xanthi (Greece) | 2–4 | (Belgium) Standard Liège | 1–2 | 1–2 |
| BK Häcken (Sweden) | 1–3 | (Switzerland) Thun | 1–2 | 0–1 |
| Minsk (Belarus) | 1–1 (3–2 p) | (Scotland) St Johnstone | 0–1 | 1–0 (a.e.t.) |

== Play-off round ==
=== Seeding ===
A total of 62 teams played in the play-off round: 18 teams which entered in this round, the 29 winners of the third qualifying round, and the 15 losers of the Champions League third qualifying round. The draw was held on 9 August 2013.

| Group 1 | | Group 2 | | Group 3 | |
| Seeded | Unseeded | Seeded | Unseeded | Seeded | Unseeded |
|---|---|---|---|---|---|
| (Portugal) Braga (Cyprus) APOEL (Turkey) Beşiktaş (Netherlands) Feyenoord (Austria) Rapid Wien | (Russia) Kuban Krasnodar (Belgium) Zulte Waregem (Norway) Tromsø (Romania) Pandurii Târgu Jiu (Georgia (country)) Dila Gori | (Ukraine) Dynamo Kyiv (Netherlands) AZ (Belgium) Genk (England) Swansea City (France) Nice | (Greece) Atromitos (Cyprus) Apollon Limassol (Kazakhstan) Aktobe (Romania) Petrolul Ploiești (Iceland) FH | (Spain) Sevilla (Belgium) Standard Liège (Austria) Red Bull Salzburg (Germany) Eintracht Frankfurt (Denmark) Nordsjælland | (Sweden) IF Elfsborg (Poland) Śląsk Wrocław (Azerbaijan) Qarabağ (Belarus) Minsk (Lithuania) Žalgiris |
| Group 4 | | Group 5 | | Group 6 | |
| Seeded | Unseeded | Seeded | Unseeded | Seeded | Unseeded |
| (Germany) VfB Stuttgart (Russia) Spartak Moscow (Greece) PAOK (Spain) Real Betis (Ukraine) Chornomorets Odesa | (Israel) Maccabi Tel Aviv (Czech Republic) Jablonec (Switzerland) St. Gallen (Croatia) Rijeka (Albania) Skënderbeu | (Russia) Rubin Kazan (Italy) Fiorentina (France) Saint-Étienne (Turkey) Trabzonspor (Moldova) Sheriff Tiraspol | (Norway) Molde (Switzerland) Grasshopper (Serbia) Vojvodina (Denmark) Esbjerg (Albania) Kukësi | (England) Tottenham Hotspur (Italy) Udinese (Ukraine) Dnipro Dnipropetrovsk (Serbia) Partizan (Israel) Maccabi Haifa (Portugal) Estoril | (Czech Republic) Slovan Liberec (Switzerland) Thun (Georgia (country)) Dinamo Tbilisi (Austria) Pasching (Romania) Astra Giurgiu (Estonia) Nõmme Kalju |

=== Summary ===
The first legs were played on 22 August, and the second legs were played on 29 August 2013.

| Team 1 | Agg. | Team 2 | 1st leg | 2nd leg |
|---|---|---|---|---|
| Kuban Krasnodar (Russia) | 3–1 | (Netherlands) Feyenoord | 1–0 | 2–1 |
| Zulte Waregem (Belgium) | 3–2 (Note: Following the completion of the play-offs, APOEL were drawn as the lucky loser to advance to the group stage (replacing the spot vacated by Fenerbahçe).) | (Cyprus) APOEL | 1–1 | 2–1 |
| Rapid Wien (Austria) | 4–0 | (Georgia (country)) Dila Gori | 1–0 | 3–0 |
| Tromsø (Norway) | 2–3 | (Turkey) Beşiktaş | 2–1 | 0–2 |
| Pandurii Târgu Jiu (Romania) | 2–1 | (Portugal) Braga | 0–1 | 2–0 (a.e.t.) |
| Apollon Limassol (Cyprus) | 2–1 | (France) Nice | 2–0 | 0–1 |
| Aktobe (Kazakhstan) | 3–8 | (Ukraine) Dynamo Kyiv | 2–3 | 1–5 |
| Swansea City (England) | 6–3 | (Romania) Petrolul Ploiești | 5–1 | 1–2 |
| Atromitos (Greece) | 3–3 (a) | (Netherlands) AZ | 1–3 | 2–0 |
| FH (Iceland) | 2–7 | (Belgium) Genk | 0–2 | 2–5 |
| IF Elfsborg (Sweden) | 2–1 | (Denmark) Nordsjælland | 1–1 | 1–0 |
| Sevilla (Spain) | 9–1 (Note: Order of legs reversed after original draw.) | (Poland) Śląsk Wrocław | 4–1 | 5–0 |
| Red Bull Salzburg (Austria) | 7–0 | (Lithuania) Žalgiris | 5–0 | 2–0 |
| Qarabağ (Azerbaijan) | 1–4 | (Germany) Eintracht Frankfurt | 0–2 | 1–2 |
| Minsk (Belarus) | 1–5 | (Belgium) Standard Liège | 0–2 | 1–3 |
| Jablonec (Czech Republic) | 1–8 | (Spain) Real Betis | 1–2 | 0–6 |
| Rijeka (Croatia) | 4–3 | (Germany) VfB Stuttgart | 2–1 | 2–2 |
| Chornomorets Odesa (Ukraine) | 1–1 (7–6 p) | (Albania) Skënderbeu | 1–0 | 0–1 (a.e.t.) |
| Maccabi Tel Aviv (Israel) | w/o (Note: On 14 August 2013, Metalist Kharkiv were disqualified from all 2013–14 UEFA club competitions because of previous match-fixing. UEFA decided to replace Metalist Kharkiv in the Champions League play-off round with PAOK, who were eliminated by Metalist Kharkiv in the third qualifying round of the Champions League. PAOK therefore vacated their place in the Europa League, and Maccabi Tel Aviv, the opponent drawn against PAOK in the Europa League play-off round, qualified directly for the Europa League group stage.) | (Greece) PAOK | Canc. | Canc. |
| St. Gallen (Switzerland) | 5–3 | (Russia) Spartak Moscow | 1–1 | 4–2 |
| Molde (Norway) | 0–5 | (Russia) Rubin Kazan | 0–2 | 0–3 |
| Vojvodina (Serbia) | 2–3 | (Moldova) Sheriff Tiraspol | 1–1 | 1–2 |
| Kukësi (Albania) | 1–5 | (Turkey) Trabzonspor | 0–2 | 1–3 |
| Esbjerg (Denmark) | 5–3 | (France) Saint-Étienne | 4–3 | 1–0 |
| Grasshopper (Switzerland) | 2–2 (a) | (Italy) Fiorentina | 1–2 | 1–0 |
| Maccabi Haifa (Israel) | 3–1 | (Romania) Astra Giurgiu | 2–0 | 1–1 |
| Udinese (Italy) | 2–4 | (Czech Republic) Slovan Liberec | 1–3 | 1–1 |
| Dinamo Tbilisi (Georgia (country)) | 0–8 | (England) Tottenham Hotspur | 0–5 | 0–3 |
| Estoril (Portugal) | 4–1 | (Austria) Pasching | 2–0 | 2–1 |
| Nõmme Kalju (Estonia) | 1–5 | (Ukraine) Dnipro Dnipropetrovsk | 1–3 | 0–2 |
| Partizan (Serbia) | 1–3 | (Switzerland) Thun | 1–0 | 0–3 |

== Statistics ==
There were 720 goals in 274 matches in the qualifying phase and play-off round, for an average of 2.63 goals per match.

=== Top goalscorers ===
| Rank | Player | Team | Goals | Minutes played |
|---|---|---|---|---|
| 1 | (Brazil) Paulo Henrique | (Turkey) Trabzonspor | 7 | 518 |
| 2 | (Romania) Gheorghe Grozav | (Romania) Petrolul Ploiești | 6 | 385 |
| 2 | (Spain) Rayo | (Israel) Maccabi Haifa | 6 | 479 |
| 2 | (Morocco) Omar Er Rafik | (Luxembourg) Differdange 03 | 6 | 568 |
| 5 | (Israel) Omer Damari | (Israel) Hapoel Tel Aviv | 5 | 320 |
| 5 | (Croatia) Leon Benko | (Croatia) Rijeka | 5 | 422 |
| 5 | (Portugal) Marco Paixão | (Poland) Śląsk Wrocław | 5 | 432 |
| 5 | (Brazil) Reynaldo | (Azerbaijan) Qarabağ | 5 | 535 |
| 9 | (Zambia) Jacob Mulenga | (Netherlands) Utrecht | 4 | 180 |
| 9 | (Austria) Louis Schaub | (Austria) Rapid Wien | 4 | 271 |
| 9 | (Venezuela) Salomón Rondón | (Russia) Rubin Kazan | 4 | 424 |
| 9 | (Poland) Waldemar Sobota | (Poland) Śląsk Wrocław | 4 | 496 |
| 9 | (Serbia) Petar Škuletić | (Serbia) Vojvodina | 4 | 516 |
| 9 | (Slovakia) Tomáš Majtán | (Slovakia) Žilina | 4 | 536 |

=== Top assists ===
| Rank | Player | Team | Assists | Minutes played |
|---|---|---|---|---|
| 1 | (France) Franck Tabanou | (France) Saint-Étienne | 5 | 332 |
| 1 | (Switzerland) Andreas Wittwer | (Switzerland) Thun | 5 | 540 |
| 2 | (Czech Republic) Bořek Dočkal | (Norway) Rosenborg | 4 | 256 |
| 2 | (Croatia) Ivan Rakitić | (Spain) Sevilla | 4 | 283 |
| 2 | (Belgium) Geoffrey Mujangi Bia | (Belgium) Standard Liège | 4 | 321 |
| 2 | (Kazakhstan) Marat Khairullin | (Kazakhstan) Aktobe | 4 | 750 |
| 6 | (Serbia) Filip Holender | (Hungary) Honvéd | 3 | 195 |
| 6 | (Spain) Michu | (England) Swansea City | 3 | 307 |
| 6 | (Spain) Jairo | (Spain) Sevilla | 3 | 313 |
| 6 | (Senegal) Ibrahima Baldé | (Russia) Kuban Krasnodar | 3 | 339 |
| 6 | (Poland) Adrian Mierzejewski | (Turkey) Trabzonspor | 3 | 442 |
| 6 | (Poland) Waldemar Sobota | (Poland) Śląsk Wrocław | 3 | 496 |
| 6 | (Brazil) Eric Pereira | (Romania) Pandurii Târgu Jiu | 3 | 503 |
| 6 | (Slovakia) Róbert Pich | (Slovakia) Žilina | 3 | 514 |
| 6 | (Israel) Shimon Abuhatzira | (Israel) Maccabi Haifa | 3 | 516 |
| 6 | (Turkey) Olcan Adın | (Turkey) Trabzonspor | 3 | 540 |
| 6 | (Brazil) Guilherme | (Romania) Petrolul Ploiești | 3 | 540 |
| 6 | (Serbia) Enver Alivodić | (Serbia) Vojvodina | 3 | 718 |
