= 2013–14 UEFA Europa League group stage =

International football competition

The group stage of the 2013–14 UEFA Europa League was played from 19 September to 12 December 2013. A total of 48 teams competed in the group stage.

== Draw ==
The draw was held on 30 August 2013, 13:00 CEST (UTC+2), at the Grimaldi Forum, Monaco. The 48 teams were allocated into four pots based on their UEFA club coefficients at the beginning of the season. They were drawn into twelve groups of four containing one team from each of the four seeding pots, with the restriction that teams from the same national association could not be drawn against each other. Moreover, the draw was controlled for teams from the same association in order to split the teams evenly into the two sets of groups (A–F, G–L) for maximum television coverage.

The fixtures were decided after the draw. On each matchday, six groups played their matches at 19:00 CEST/CET, while the other six groups played their matches at 21:05 CEST/CET, with the two sets of groups (A–F, G–L) alternating between each matchday. There were other restrictions, e.g., teams from the same city (e.g., Sevilla and Real Betis) in general did not play at home on the same matchday (UEFA tried to avoid teams from the same city playing at home on the same day), and Russian and Kazakh teams did not play at home on the last matchday due to cold weather.

== Teams ==
Below were the 48 teams which qualified for the group stage (with their 2013 UEFA club coefficients), grouped by their seeding pot. They included 7 teams which entered in this stage, the 29 winners of the play-off round, the 9 losers of the Champions League play-off round, and 3 teams which qualified due to disqualification of other teams:

- Maccabi Tel Aviv: On 14 August 2013, Metalist Kharkiv were disqualified from the 2013–14 UEFA club competitions because of previous match-fixing. UEFA decided to replace Metalist Kharkiv in the Champions League play-off round with PAOK, who were eliminated by Metalist Kharkiv in the third qualifying round. Thus, Maccabi Tel Aviv, the opponent of PAOK in the Europa League play-off round, qualified directly for the Europa League group stage.
- Tromsø: On 25 June 2013, Beşiktaş were banned by UEFA from the 2013–14 UEFA club competitions because of the 2011 Turkish sports corruption scandal. They appealed the ban to the Court of Arbitration for Sport, and on 18 July 2013 it was ruled that the ban should be temporarily lifted and they should be included in the qualifying round draws of the Europa League, until the final decision to be made before the end of August 2013. Beşiktaş competed in the Europa League play-off round and won. On 30 August 2013, the Court of Arbitration for Sport upheld UEFA's ban, meaning Beşiktaş were banned from the 2013–14 UEFA Europa League. UEFA decided to replace Beşiktaş in the Europa League group stage with Tromsø, who were eliminated by Beşiktaş in the play-off round.
- APOEL: On 25 June 2013, Fenerbahçe were banned by UEFA from the 2013–14 UEFA club competitions because of the 2011 Turkish sports corruption scandal. They appealed the ban to the Court of Arbitration for Sport, and on 18 July 2013 it was ruled that the ban should be temporarily lifted and they should be included in the qualifying round draws of the Champions League, until the final decision to be made before the end of August 2013. Fenerbahçe competed in the Champions League qualifying rounds and lost in the play-off round. On 28 August 2013, the Court of Arbitration for Sport upheld UEFA's ban, meaning Fenerbahçe were banned from the 2013–14 UEFA Europa League. A draw was held on 30 August 2013, 09:00, in Monaco, to select a team to replace Fenerbahçe in the Europa League group stage among the teams eliminated in the play-off round, and was won by APOEL.

Key to colours in group tables
Group winners and runners-up advanced to the round of 32

Pot 1
Team	Notes	Coeff
(Spain) Valencia		102.605
(France) Lyon		95.800
(England) Tottenham Hotspur		69.592
(Ukraine) Dynamo Kyiv		68.951
(Netherlands) PSV Eindhoven		64.945
(France) Bordeaux		59.800
(Russia) Rubin Kazan		58.266
(Spain) Sevilla		55.105
(Belgium) Standard Liège		45.880
(Italy) Fiorentina		42.829
(Italy) Lazio		41.829
(Netherlands) AZ		39.445

Pot 2
Team	Notes	Coeff
(Cyprus) APOEL		35.366
(Greece) PAOK		28.800
(Austria) Red Bull Salzburg		28.075
(Belgium) Genk		26.880
(Croatia) Dinamo Zagreb		25.916
(Ukraine) Dnipro Dnipropetrovsk		23.951
(Turkey) Trabzonspor		21.400
(Russia) Anzhi Makhachkala		20.266
(Spain) Real Betis		17.605
(England) Wigan Athletic		16.592
(England) Swansea City		16.592
(Germany) SC Freiburg		15.922

Pot 3
Team	Notes	Coeff
(Germany) Eintracht Frankfurt		15.922
(Portugal) Vitória de Guimarães		14.333
(Poland) Legia Warsaw		13.650
(Israel) Maccabi Haifa		13.575
(Austria) Rapid Wien		13.075
(Portugal) Paços de Ferreira		12.833
(Portugal) Estoril		11.833
(Moldova) Sheriff Tiraspol		11.533
(Ukraine) Chornomorets Odesa		9.951
(Slovenia) Maribor		9.941
(Russia) Kuban Krasnodar		9.266
(Sweden) IF Elfsborg		8.125

Pot 4
Team	Notes	Coeff
(Israel) Maccabi Tel Aviv		8.075
(Czech Republic) Slovan Liberec		7.745
(Switzerland) Thun		7.285
(Belgium) Zulte Waregem		6.880
(Cyprus) Apollon Limassol		6.366
(Norway) Tromsø		6.335
(Switzerland) St. Gallen		5.785
(Denmark) Esbjerg		5.140
(Croatia) Rijeka		4.916
(Romania) Pandurii Târgu Jiu		4.604
(Bulgaria) Ludogorets Razgrad		3.450
(Kazakhstan) Shakhter Karagandy		2.941

Notes

1. ^{EL-PO} Qualified through play-off round
2. ^{CL-CR} Losers of the Champions League play-off round (Champions Route)
3. ^{CL-LR} Losers of the Champions League play-off round (League Route)
4. ^{LL} Qualified as "lucky loser", after defeat in the play-off round, due to disqualification of Fenerbahçe and Beşiktaş respectively

== Format ==
In each group, teams played against each other home-and-away in a round-robin format. The group winners and runners-up advanced to the round of 32, where they were joined by the eight third-placed teams from the Champions League group stage.

=== Tiebreakers ===
The teams are ranked according to points (3 points for a win, 1 point for a draw, 0 points for a loss). If two or more teams are equal on points on completion of the group matches, the following criteria are applied to determine the rankings:

1. higher number of points obtained in the group matches played among the teams in question;
2. superior goal difference from the group matches played among the teams in question;
3. higher number of goals scored in the group matches played among the teams in question;
4. higher number of goals scored away from home in the group matches played among the teams in question;
5. If, after applying criteria 1 to 4 to several teams, two teams still have an equal ranking, criteria 1 to 4 are reapplied exclusively to the matches between the two teams in question to determine their final rankings. If this procedure does not lead to a decision, criteria 6 to 8 apply;
6. superior goal difference from all group matches played;
7. higher number of goals scored from all group matches played;
8. higher number of coefficient points accumulated by the club in question, as well as its association, over the previous five seasons.

== Groups ==
The matchdays were 19 September, 3 October, 24 October, 7 November, 28 November and 12 December 2013. The match kickoff times were 19:00 and 21:05 CEST/CET, except for matches in Russia, which were 18:00 CEST/CET; and in Kazakhstan, where the first two were 18:00 CEST/CET and the last one was 16:00 CEST/CET. Times up to 26 October 2013 (matchdays 1–3) were CEST (UTC+2), thereafter (matchdays 4–6) times were CET (UTC+1).

=== Group A ===
Pos	Team	Pld	W	D	L	GF	GA	GD	Pts	Qualification	VAL	SWA	KUB	STG
1	(Spain) Valencia	6	4	1	1	12	7	+5	13	Advance to knockout phase	—	0–3	1–1	5–1
2	(England) Swansea City	6	2	2	2	6	4	+2	8	Advance to knockout phase	0–1	—	1–1	1–0
3	(Russia) Kuban Krasnodar	6	1	3	2	7	7	0	6 (Note: Tied on head-to-head points (3). Head-to-head goal difference: Kuban Krasnodar +2, St. Gallen −2.)		0–2	1–1	—	4–0
4	(Switzerland) St. Gallen	6	2	0	4	6	13	−7	6		2–3	1–0	2–0	—

Source: Soccerway
Notes:
19 September 2013
19:00

Valencia (Spain)	0–3	(England) Swansea City
	Report	Bony 14'; Michu 58'; De Guzmán 62'

Mestalla, Valencia
Attendance: 32,305
Referee: Serge Gumienny (Belgium)
19 September 2013
19:00

St. Gallen (Switzerland)	2–0	(Russia) Kuban Krasnodar
Karanović 56'; Mathys 76'	Report

AFG Arena, St. Gallen
Attendance: 12,551
Referee: Paweł Gil (Poland)

3 October 2013
18:00

Kuban Krasnodar (Russia)	0–2	(Spain) Valencia
	Report	Alcácer 73'; Feghouli 81'

Kuban Stadium, Krasnodar
Attendance: 29,300
Referee: Marijo Strahonja (Croatia)
3 October 2013
21:05

Swansea City (England)	1–0	(Switzerland) St. Gallen
Routledge 52'	Report

Liberty Stadium, Swansea
Attendance: 15,397
Referee: Duarte Gomes (Portugal)

24 October 2013
21:05

Swansea City (England)	1–1	(Russia) Kuban Krasnodar
Michu 68'	Report	Cissé 90+3' (pen.)

Liberty Stadium, Swansea
Attendance: 14,964
Referee: Kristinn Jakobsson (Iceland)
24 October 2013
21:05

Valencia (Spain)	5–1	(Switzerland) St. Gallen
Alcácer 12'; Cartabia 21', 30'; Costa 33'; Canales 71'	Report	Nater 74'

Mestalla, Valencia
Attendance: 26,645
Referee: Pol van Boekel (Netherlands)

7 November 2013
18:00

Kuban Krasnodar (Russia)	1–1	(England) Swansea City
Baldé 90+2'	Report	Bony 9'

Kuban Stadium, Krasnodar
Attendance: 27,843
Referee: Robert Schörgenhofer (Austria)
7 November 2013
19:00

St. Gallen (Switzerland)	2–3	(Spain) Valencia
Besle 37'; Karanović 66'	Report	Piatti 30', 76'; Canales 86'

AFG Arena, St. Gallen
Attendance: 16,951
Referee: Aleksei Kulbakov (Belarus)

28 November 2013
18:00

Kuban Krasnodar (Russia)	4–0	(Switzerland) St. Gallen
Melgarejo 3', 71'; Ignatyev 54'; Kaboré 90'	Report

Kuban Stadium, Krasnodar
Attendance: 19,032
Referee: Anastassios Kakos (Greece)
28 November 2013
21:05

Swansea City (England)	0–1	(Spain) Valencia
	Report	Parejo 20'

Liberty Stadium, Swansea
Attendance: 17,896
Referee: Luca Banti (Italy)

12 December 2013
19:00

Valencia (Spain)	1–1	(Russia) Kuban Krasnodar
Alcácer 67'	Report	Melgarejo 84'

Mestalla, Valencia
Attendance: 14,581
Referee: Miroslav Zelinka (Czech Republic)
12 December 2013
19:00

St. Gallen (Switzerland)	1–0	(England) Swansea City
Mathys 80'	Report

AFG Arena, St. Gallen
Attendance: 15,298
Referee: Liran Liany (Israel)

=== Group B ===
Pos	Team	Pld	W	D	L	GF	GA	GD	Pts	Qualification	LUD	CHO	PSV	DIN
1	(Bulgaria) Ludogorets Razgrad	6	5	1	0	11	2	+9	16	Advance to knockout phase	—	1–1	2–0	3–0
2	(Ukraine) Chornomorets Odesa	6	3	1	2	6	6	0	10	Advance to knockout phase	0–1	—	0–2	2–1
3	(Netherlands) PSV Eindhoven	6	2	1	3	4	5	−1	7		0–2	0–1	—	2–0
4	(Croatia) Dinamo Zagreb	6	0	1	5	3	11	−8	1		1–2	1–2	0–0	—

Source: Soccerway
19 September 2013
19:00

Dinamo Zagreb (Croatia)	1–2	(Ukraine) Chornomorets Odesa
Fernándes 43'	Report	Antonov 62'; Dja Djédjé 65'

Stadion Maksimir, Zagreb
Attendance: 12,522
Referee: Hüseyin Göçek (Turkey)
19 September 2013
19:00

PSV Eindhoven (Netherlands)	0–2	(Bulgaria) Ludogorets Razgrad
	Report	Bezjak 60'; Misidjan 74'

Philips Stadion, Eindhoven
Attendance: 11,000
Referee: Ivan Kružliak (Slovakia)

3 October 2013
21:05

Ludogorets Razgrad (Bulgaria)	3–0	(Croatia) Dinamo Zagreb
Juninho Quixadá 12'; Misidjan 34'; Dyakov 61'	Report

Vasil Levski National Stadium, Sofia (Note: Ludogorets Razgrad played their home matches at Vasil Levski National Stadium, Sofia instead of their regular stadium, Ludogorets Arena, Razgrad, as it did not meet UEFA requirements.)
Attendance: 6,900
Referee: Stephan Studer (Switzerland)
3 October 2013
21:05

Chornomorets Odesa (Ukraine)	0–2	(Netherlands) PSV Eindhoven
	Report	Depay 13'; Jozefzoon 88'

Chornomorets Stadium, Odesa
Attendance: 33,839
Referee: Liran Liany (Israel)

24 October 2013
21:05

Chornomorets Odesa (Ukraine)	0–1	(Bulgaria) Ludogorets Razgrad
	Report	Zlatinski 45'

Chornomorets Stadium, Odesa
Attendance: 20,082
Referee: Alexandru Tudor (Romania)
24 October 2013
21:05

Dinamo Zagreb (Croatia)	0–0	(Netherlands) PSV Eindhoven
	Report

Stadion Maksimir, Zagreb
Attendance: 75 (Note: The Dinamo Zagreb v PSV Eindhoven match was played behind closed doors due to punishment by UEFA.)
Referee: Paweł Gil (Poland)

7 November 2013
19:00

Ludogorets Razgrad (Bulgaria)	1–1	(Ukraine) Chornomorets Odesa
Juninho Quixadá 47'	Report	Gai 64'

Vasil Levski National Stadium, Sofia
Attendance: 6,113
Referee: Stefan Johannesson (Sweden)
7 November 2013
19:00

PSV Eindhoven (Netherlands)	2–0	(Croatia) Dinamo Zagreb
Maher 29'; Toivonen 57'	Report

Philips Stadion, Eindhoven
Attendance: 10,500
Referee: Cristian Balaj (Romania)

28 November 2013
21:05

Chornomorets Odesa (Ukraine)	2–1	(Croatia) Dinamo Zagreb
Antonov 78'; Didenko 90+1'	Report	Bećiraj 20'

Chornomorets Stadium, Odesa
Attendance: 14,182
Referee: Felix Zwayer (Germany)
28 November 2013
21:05

Ludogorets Razgrad (Bulgaria)	2–0	(Netherlands) PSV Eindhoven
Bezjak 38', 79'	Report

Vasil Levski National Stadium, Sofia
Attendance: 3,012
Referee: Nicola Rizzoli (Italy)

12 December 2013
19:00

Dinamo Zagreb (Croatia)	1–2	(Bulgaria) Ludogorets Razgrad
Čop 45+1'	Report	Abalo 28'; Bezjak 72'

Stadion Maksimir, Zagreb
Attendance: 3,120
Referee: Vladislav Bezborodov (Russia)
12 December 2013
19:00

PSV Eindhoven (Netherlands)	0–1	(Ukraine) Chornomorets Odesa
	Report	Dja Djédjé 59'

Philips Stadion, Eindhoven
Attendance: 13,500
Referee: Carlos Clos Gómez (Spain)

=== Group C ===
Pos	Team	Pld	W	D	L	GF	GA	GD	Pts	Qualification	SAL	ESB	ELF	STA
1	(Austria) Red Bull Salzburg	6	6	0	0	15	3	+12	18	Advance to knockout phase	—	3–0	4–0	2–1
2	(Denmark) Esbjerg	6	4	0	2	8	8	0	12	Advance to knockout phase	1–2	—	1–0	2–1
3	(Sweden) IF Elfsborg	6	1	1	4	5	10	−5	4		0–1	1–2	—	1–1
4	(Belgium) Standard Liège	6	0	1	5	6	13	−7	1		1–3	1–2	1–3	—

Source: Soccerway
19 September 2013
19:00

Red Bull Salzburg (Austria)	4–0	(Sweden) IF Elfsborg
Alan 36'; Soriano 44' (pen.), 69', 79'	Report

Red Bull Arena, Wals-Siezenheim
Attendance: 7,879
Referee: Leontios Trattou (Cyprus)
19 September 2013
19:00

Standard Liège (Belgium)	1–2	(Denmark) Esbjerg
Mujangi Bia 74'	Report	Van Buren 63'; Bakenga 90+5'

Stade Maurice Dufrasne, Liège
Attendance: 11,871
Referee: Gediminas Mažeika (Lithuania)

3 October 2013
21:05

Esbjerg (Denmark)	1–2	(Austria) Red Bull Salzburg
Diouf 89'	Report	Alan 6', 38'

Blue Water Arena, Esbjerg
Attendance: 11,298
Referee: Jorge Sousa (Portugal)
3 October 2013
21:05

IF Elfsborg (Sweden)	1–1	(Belgium) Standard Liège
Claesson 23'	Report	Mujangi Bia 62'

Borås Arena, Borås
Attendance: 3,778
Referee: Tony Chapron (France)

24 October 2013
21:05

IF Elfsborg (Sweden)	1–2	(Denmark) Esbjerg
Jönsson 69'	Report	Andreasen 7', 67'

Borås Arena, Borås
Attendance: 3,142
Referee: Michael Oliver (England)
24 October 2013
21:05

Red Bull Salzburg (Austria)	2–1	(Belgium) Standard Liège
Soriano 53'; Ramalho 85'	Report	Mujangi Bia 88' (pen.)

Red Bull Arena, Wals-Siezenheim
Attendance: 14,856
Referee: Ivan Kružliak (Slovakia)

7 November 2013
19:00

Esbjerg (Denmark)	1–0	(Sweden) IF Elfsborg
Rohdén 71' (o.g.)	Report

Blue Water Arena, Esbjerg
Attendance: 10,049
Referee: Serhiy Boyko (Ukraine)
7 November 2013
19:00

Standard Liège (Belgium)	1–3	(Austria) Red Bull Salzburg
M'Poku 55'	Report	Švento 42'; Kampl 45+1'; Alan 59'

Stade Maurice Dufrasne, Liège
Attendance: 20,000
Referee: Aleksei Nikolaev (Russia)

28 November 2013
21:05

IF Elfsborg (Sweden)	0–1	(Austria) Red Bull Salzburg
	Report	Meilinger 39'

Borås Arena, Borås
Attendance: 2,456
Referee: Kristo Tohver (Estonia)
28 November 2013
21:05

Esbjerg (Denmark)	2–1	(Belgium) Standard Liège
Van Buren 18', 79'	Report	De Camargo 53'

Blue Water Arena, Esbjerg
Attendance: 9,184
Referee: Cristian Balaj (Romania)

12 December 2013
19:00

Red Bull Salzburg (Austria)	3–0	(Denmark) Esbjerg
Mané 19', 63'; Kampl 58'	Report

Red Bull Arena, Wals-Siezenheim
Attendance: 6,890
Referee: Bülent Yıldırım (Turkey)
12 December 2013
19:00

Standard Liège (Belgium)	1–3	(Sweden) IF Elfsborg
Mbombo 31'	Report	Nilsson 41', 46'; Beckmann 52'

Stade Maurice Dufrasne, Liège
Attendance: 6,466
Referee: Steven McLean (Scotland)

=== Group D ===
Pos	Team	Pld	W	D	L	GF	GA	GD	Pts	Qualification	RUB	MAR	ZUL	WIG
1	(Russia) Rubin Kazan	6	4	2	0	14	4	+10	14	Advance to knockout phase	—	1–1	4–0	1–0
2	(Slovenia) Maribor	6	2	1	3	9	12	−3	7 (Note: Tied on head-to-head points (3). Head-to-head goal difference: Maribor +1, Zulte Waregem −1.)	Advance to knockout phase	2–5	—	0–1	2–1
3	(Belgium) Zulte Waregem	6	2	1	3	4	10	−6	7		0–2	1–3	—	0–0
4	(England) Wigan Athletic	6	1	2	3	6	7	−1	5		1–1	3–1	1–2	—

Source: Soccerway
Notes:
19 September 2013
19:00

Zulte Waregem (Belgium)	0–0	(England) Wigan Athletic
	Report

Jan Breydel Stadium, Bruges (Note: Zulte Waregem played their home matches at Jan Breydel Stadium, Bruges instead of their regular stadium, Regenboogstadion, Waregem.)
Attendance: 7,041
Referee: Marcin Borski (Poland)
19 September 2013
19:00

Maribor (Slovenia)	2–5	(Russia) Rubin Kazan
Milec 35'; Fajić 73'	Report	Karadeniz 23'; Marcano 27'; Eremenko 69'; Rondón 90'; Ryazantsev 90+4'

Ljudski vrt, Maribor
Attendance: 7,500
Referee: Pol van Boekel (Netherlands)

3 October 2013
18:00

Rubin Kazan (Russia)	4–0	(Belgium) Zulte Waregem
Duplus 60' (o.g.); Eremenko 73'; Ryazantsev 81'; Natcho 89'	Report

Central Stadium, Kazan
Attendance: 4,057
Referee: Kristo Tohver (Estonia)
3 October 2013
21:05

Wigan Athletic (England)	3–1	(Slovenia) Maribor
Powell 22', 90+1'; Watson 34'	Report	Tavares 60'

DW Stadium, Wigan
Attendance: 12,753
Referee: Aleksandar Stavrev (Macedonia)

24 October 2013
21:05

Wigan Athletic (England)	1–1	(Russia) Rubin Kazan
Powell 40'	Report	Prudnikov 15'

DW Stadium, Wigan
Attendance: 14,723
Referee: Florian Meyer (Germany)
24 October 2013
21:05

Zulte Waregem (Belgium)	1–3	(Slovenia) Maribor
De Fauw 12'	Report	Črnic 21'; Mertelj 34'; Mezga 49'

Jan Breydel Stadium, Bruges
Attendance: 5,023
Referee: Stephan Studer (Switzerland)

7 November 2013
18:00

Rubin Kazan (Russia)	1–0	(England) Wigan Athletic
Kuzmin 22'	Report

Central Stadium, Kazan
Attendance: 5,579
Referee: Hüseyin Göçek (Turkey)
7 November 2013
19:00

Maribor (Slovenia)	0–1	(Belgium) Zulte Waregem
	Report	Hazard 29' (pen.)

Ljudski vrt, Maribor
Attendance: 8,500
Referee: Libor Kovařík (Czech Republic)

28 November 2013
18:00

Rubin Kazan (Russia)	1–1	(Slovenia) Maribor
Natcho 43'	Report	Mezga 86'

Central Stadium, Kazan
Attendance: 2,754
Referee: Ivan Kružliak (Slovakia)
28 November 2013
21:05

Wigan Athletic (England)	1–2	(Belgium) Zulte Waregem
Barnett 7'	Report	Hazard 37'; Malanda 88'

DW Stadium, Wigan
Attendance: 15,503
Referee: Ruddy Buquet (France)

12 December 2013
19:00

Zulte Waregem (Belgium)	0–2	(Russia) Rubin Kazan
	Report	Natcho 79' (pen.); Rondón 85'

Jan Breydel Stadium, Bruges
Attendance: 6,083
Referee: Paolo Mazzoleni (Italy)
12 December 2013
19:00

Maribor (Slovenia)	2–1	(England) Wigan Athletic
Mezga 43'; Filipović 59'	Report	Gómez 41' (pen.)

Ljudski vrt, Maribor
Attendance: 9,035
Referee: Szymon Marciniak (Poland)

=== Group E ===
Pos	Team	Pld	W	D	L	GF	GA	GD	Pts	Qualification	FIO	DNI	PAC	PAN
1	(Italy) Fiorentina	6	5	1	0	12	3	+9	16	Advance to knockout phase	—	2–1	3–0	3–0
2	(Ukraine) Dnipro Dnipropetrovsk	6	4	0	2	11	5	+6	12	Advance to knockout phase	1–2	—	2–0	4–1
3	(Portugal) Paços de Ferreira	6	0	3	3	1	8	−7	3		0–0	0–2	—	1–1
4	(Romania) Pandurii Târgu Jiu	6	0	2	4	3	11	−8	2		1–2	0–1	0–0	—

Source: Soccerway
19 September 2013
19:00

Fiorentina (Italy)	3–0	(Portugal) Paços de Ferreira
Gonzalo 30'; Matos 67'; Rossi 76'	Report

Stadio Artemio Franchi, Florence
Attendance: 13,729
Referee: Kevin Blom (Netherlands)
19 September 2013
19:00

Pandurii Târgu Jiu (Romania)	0–1	(Ukraine) Dnipro Dnipropetrovsk
	Report	Rotan 38'

Cluj Arena, Cluj-Napoca (Note: Pandurii Târgu Jiu played their home matches at Cluj Arena, Cluj-Napoca instead of their regular stadium, Stadionul Tudor Vladimirescu, Târgu Jiu, as it did not meet UEFA requirements.)
Attendance: 7,577
Referee: Sascha Kever (Switzerland)

3 October 2013
21:05

Dnipro Dnipropetrovsk (Ukraine)	1–2	(Italy) Fiorentina
Seleznyov 57' (pen.)	Report	Gonzalo 53' (pen.); Ambrosini 73'

Dnipro-Arena, Dnipropetrovsk
Attendance: 25,837
Referee: Szymon Marciniak (Poland)
3 October 2013
21:05

Paços de Ferreira (Portugal)	1–1	(Romania) Pandurii Târgu Jiu
Rui Miguel 49'	Report	Momčilović 5'

Estádio D. Afonso Henriques, Guimarães (Note: Paços de Ferreira played their home matches at Estádio D. Afonso Henriques, Guimarães instead of their regular stadium, Estádio da Mata Real, Paços de Ferreira, due to renovation.)
Attendance: 1,314
Referee: Aleksei Nikolaev (Russia)

24 October 2013
21:05

Paços de Ferreira (Portugal)	0–2	(Ukraine) Dnipro Dnipropetrovsk
	Report	Rotan 83'; Konoplyanka 86'

Estádio D. Afonso Henriques, Guimarães
Attendance: 1,137
Referee: Tony Chapron (France)
24 October 2013
21:05

Fiorentina (Italy)	3–0	(Romania) Pandurii Târgu Jiu
Joaquín 26'; Matos 34'; Cuadrado 69'	Report

Stadio Artemio Franchi, Florence
Attendance: 14,834
Referee: Miroslav Zelinka (Czech Republic)

7 November 2013
19:00

Dnipro Dnipropetrovsk (Ukraine)	2–0	(Portugal) Paços de Ferreira
Matheus 44'; Konoplyanka 66'	Report

Dnipro-Arena, Dnipropetrovsk
Attendance: 14,039
Referee: Antti Munukka (Finland)
7 November 2013
19:00

Pandurii Târgu Jiu (Romania)	1–2	(Italy) Fiorentina
Eric 32'	Report	Matos 86'; Valero 90+2'

Cluj Arena, Cluj-Napoca
Attendance: 11,750
Referee: Anastasios Sidiropoulos (Greece)

28 November 2013
21:05

Paços de Ferreira (Portugal)	0–0	(Italy) Fiorentina
	Report

Estádio D. Afonso Henriques, Guimarães
Attendance: 1,347
Referee: Eitan Shemeulevitch (Israel)
28 November 2013
21:05

Dnipro Dnipropetrovsk (Ukraine)	4–1	(Romania) Pandurii Târgu Jiu
Kalinić 12'; Zozulya 56'; Shakhov 86'; Kravchenko 89'	Report	Eric 70' (pen.)

Dnipro-Arena, Dnipropetrovsk
Attendance: 5,157
Referee: Leontios Trattou (Cyprus)

12 December 2013
19:00

Fiorentina (Italy)	2–1	(Ukraine) Dnipro Dnipropetrovsk
Joaquín 42'; Cuadrado 77'	Report	Konoplyanka 13'

Stadio Artemio Franchi, Florence
Attendance: 12,486
Referee: Artur Soares Dias (Portugal)
12 December 2013
19:00

Pandurii Târgu Jiu (Romania)	0–0	(Portugal) Paços de Ferreira
	Report

Cluj Arena, Cluj-Napoca
Attendance: 1,213
Referee: Simon Lee Evans (Wales)

=== Group F ===
Pos	Team	Pld	W	D	L	GF	GA	GD	Pts	Qualification	EIN	MTA	APO	BOR
1	(Germany) Eintracht Frankfurt	6	5	0	1	13	4	+9	15	Advance to knockout phase	—	2–0	2–0	3–0
2	(Israel) Maccabi Tel Aviv	6	3	2	1	7	5	+2	11	Advance to knockout phase	4–2	—	0–0	1–0
3	(Cyprus) APOEL	6	1	2	3	3	8	−5	5		0–3	0–0	—	2–1
4	(France) Bordeaux	6	1	0	5	4	10	−6	3		0–1	1–2	2–1	—

Source: Soccerway
19 September 2013
19:00

Eintracht Frankfurt (Germany)	3–0	(France) Bordeaux
Kadlec 4'; Russ 16'; Djakpa 52'	Report

Commerzbank-Arena, Frankfurt am Main
Attendance: 44,000
Referee: Andre Marriner (England)
19 September 2013
19:00

Maccabi Tel Aviv (Israel)	0–0	(Cyprus) APOEL
	Report

Bloomfield Stadium, Tel Aviv
Attendance: 11,772
Referee: Carlos Clos Gómez (Spain)

3 October 2013
21:05

APOEL (Cyprus)	0–3	(Germany) Eintracht Frankfurt
	Report	Alexandrou 27' (o.g.); Lakić 59'; Jung 66'

GSP Stadium, Nicosia
Attendance: 13,729
Referee: Alexandru Tudor (Romania)
3 October 2013
21:05

Bordeaux (France)	1–2	(Israel) Maccabi Tel Aviv
Jussiê 48'	Report	Yitzhaki 71'; Micha 80'

Stade Chaban-Delmas, Bordeaux
Attendance: 7,329
Referee: Michael Koukoulakis (Greece)

24 October 2013
21:05

Bordeaux (France)	2–1	(Cyprus) APOEL
Sané 24'; Henrique 90'	Report	Gonçalves 45'

Stade Chaban-Delmas, Bordeaux
Attendance: 10,404
Referee: Martin Strömbergsson (Sweden)
24 October 2013
21:05

Eintracht Frankfurt (Germany)	2–0	(Israel) Maccabi Tel Aviv
Kadlec 13'; Meier 53'	Report

Commerzbank-Arena, Frankfurt am Main
Attendance: 40,800
Referee: Antonio Damato (Italy)

7 November 2013
19:00

APOEL (Cyprus)	2–1	(France) Bordeaux
Alexandrou 14'; Morais 55'	Report	Sané 45+2'

GSP Stadium, Nicosia
Attendance: 11,853
Referee: Sébastien Delferiere (Belgium)
7 November 2013
19:00

Maccabi Tel Aviv (Israel)	4–2	(Germany) Eintracht Frankfurt
Zahavi 14', 90+4' (pen.); Yitzhaki 30', 35'	Report	Lakić 63'; Meier 67' (pen.)

Bloomfield Stadium, Tel Aviv
Attendance: 13,232
Referee: Serge Gumienny (Belgium)

28 November 2013
21:05

Bordeaux (France)	0–1	(Germany) Eintracht Frankfurt
	Report	Lanig 83'

Stade Chaban-Delmas, Bordeaux
Attendance: 19,013
Referee: Alberto Undiano Mallenco (Spain)
28 November 2013
21:05

APOEL (Cyprus)	0–0	(Israel) Maccabi Tel Aviv
	Report

GSP Stadium, Nicosia
Attendance: 13,052
Referee: István Vad (Hungary)

12 December 2013
19:00

Eintracht Frankfurt (Germany)	2–0	(Cyprus) APOEL
Schröck 68'; Djakpa 77'	Report

Commerzbank-Arena, Frankfurt am Main
Attendance: 32,400
Referee: Stephan Studer (Switzerland)
12 December 2013
19:00

Maccabi Tel Aviv (Israel)	1–0	(France) Bordeaux
Zahavi 74' (pen.)	Report

Bloomfield Stadium, Tel Aviv
Attendance: 11,732
Referee: Serhiy Boyko (Ukraine)

=== Group G ===
Pos	Team	Pld	W	D	L	GF	GA	GD	Pts	Qualification	GEN	DYN	RAP	THU
1	(Belgium) Genk	6	4	2	0	10	5	+5	14	Advance to knockout phase	—	3–1	1–1	2–1
2	(Ukraine) Dynamo Kyiv	6	3	1	2	11	7	+4	10	Advance to knockout phase	0–1	—	3–1	3–0
3	(Austria) Rapid Wien	6	1	3	2	8	10	−2	6		2–2	2–2	—	2–1
4	(Switzerland) Thun	6	1	0	5	3	10	−7	3		0–1	0–2	1–0	—

Source: Soccerway
19 September 2013
21:05

Dynamo Kyiv (Ukraine)	0–1	(Belgium) Genk
	Report	Gorius 62'

Olympic Stadium, Kyiv
Attendance: 30,345
Referee: Anastasios Sidiropoulos (Greece)
19 September 2013
21:05

Thun (Switzerland)	1–0	(Austria) Rapid Wien
C. Schneuwly 35'	Report

Arena Thun, Thun
Attendance: 7,022
Referee: Anastassios Kakos (Greece)

3 October 2013
19:00

Rapid Wien (Austria)	2–2	(Ukraine) Dynamo Kyiv
Burgstaller 53'; Trimmel 90+4'	Report	Yarmolenko 30'; Dibon 34' (o.g.)

Ernst-Happel-Stadion, Vienna (Note: Rapid Wien played their home matches at Ernst-Happel-Stadion, Vienna instead of their regular stadium, Gerhard Hanappi Stadium, Vienna.)
Attendance: 34,800
Referee: Mike Dean (England)
3 October 2013
19:00

Genk (Belgium)	2–1	(Switzerland) Thun
Gorius 55'; Vossen 63'	Report	Martínez 90+3'

Cristal Arena, Genk
Attendance: 11,559
Referee: Bobby Madden (Scotland)

24 October 2013
19:00

Genk (Belgium)	1–1	(Austria) Rapid Wien
Gorius 21'	Report	Sabitzer 82'

Cristal Arena, Genk
Attendance: 14,142
Referee: Antony Gautier (France)
24 October 2013
19:00

Dynamo Kyiv (Ukraine)	3–0	(Switzerland) Thun
Yarmolenko 35'; Mbokani 60'; Husyev 78'	Report

Olympic Stadium, Kyiv
Attendance: 26,042
Referee: Halis Özkahya (Turkey)

7 November 2013
21:05

Rapid Wien (Austria)	2–2	(Belgium) Genk
Boyd 40', 45+2'	Report	Mbodj 28' (pen.); Buffel 60'

Ernst-Happel-Stadion, Vienna
Attendance: 34,300
Referee: Fırat Aydınus (Turkey)
7 November 2013
21:05

Thun (Switzerland)	0–2	(Ukraine) Dynamo Kyiv
	Report	Schenkel 29' (o.g.); Yarmolenko 69'

Arena Thun, Thun
Attendance: 6,523
Referee: Clément Turpin (France)

28 November 2013
19:00

Genk (Belgium)	3–1	(Ukraine) Dynamo Kyiv
Vossen 17' (pen.); Kumordzi 37'; De Ceulaer 40'	Report	Yarmolenko 9'

Cristal Arena, Genk
Attendance: 13,337
Referee: Duarte Gomes (Portugal)
28 November 2013
19:00

Rapid Wien (Austria)	2–1	(Switzerland) Thun
Boyd 17'; Bošković 64'	Report	Sadik 62'

Ernst-Happel-Stadion, Vienna
Attendance: 34,300
Referee: Paweł Gil (Poland)

12 December 2013
21:05

Dynamo Kyiv (Ukraine)	3–1	(Austria) Rapid Wien
Lens 22'; Husyev 28'; Veloso 70'	Report	Boyd 6'

Olympic Stadium, Kyiv
Attendance: 18,752
Referee: Björn Kuipers (Netherlands)
12 December 2013
21:05

Thun (Switzerland)	0–1	(Belgium) Genk
	Report	Vossen 31'

Arena Thun, Thun
Attendance: 5,185
Referee: Alexandru Tudor (Romania)

=== Group H ===
Pos	Team	Pld	W	D	L	GF	GA	GD	Pts	Qualification	SEV	SLO	FRE	EST
1	(Spain) Sevilla	6	3	3	0	9	4	+5	12	Advance to knockout phase	—	1–1	2–0	1–1
2	(Czech Republic) Slovan Liberec	6	2	3	1	9	8	+1	9	Advance to knockout phase	1–1	—	1–2	2–1
3	(Germany) SC Freiburg	6	1	3	2	5	8	−3	6		0–2	2–2	—	1–1
4	(Portugal) Estoril	6	0	3	3	5	8	−3	3		1–2	1–2	0–0	—

Source: Soccerway
19 September 2013
21:05

SC Freiburg (Germany)	2–2	(Czech Republic) Slovan Liberec
Schuster 23' (pen.); Mehmedi 35'	Report	Kalytvyntsev 67'; Rabušic 74'

Mage Solar Stadion, Freiburg im Breisgau
Attendance: 14,100
Referee: Cristian Balaj (Romania)
19 September 2013
21:05

Estoril (Portugal)	1–2	(Spain) Sevilla
Bruno Miguel 61'	Report	Vitolo 59'; Gameiro 77'

Estádio António Coimbra da Mota, Estoril
Attendance: 4,154
Referee: Alon Yefet (Israel)

3 October 2013
19:00

Sevilla (Spain)	2–0	(Germany) SC Freiburg
Perotti 63' (pen.); Bacca 90+1'	Report

Ramón Sánchez Pizjuán, Seville
Attendance: 17,041
Referee: Vladislav Bezborodov (Russia)
3 October 2013
19:00

Slovan Liberec (Czech Republic)	2–1	(Portugal) Estoril
Šural 15'; Kováč 62'	Report	Leal 45'

Stadion u Nisy, Liberec
Attendance: 7,500
Referee: Kenn Hansen (Denmark)

24 October 2013
19:00

Slovan Liberec (Czech Republic)	1–1	(Spain) Sevilla
Rabušic 20'	Report	Vitolo 88'

Stadion u Nisy, Liberec
Attendance: 7,700
Referee: Mike Dean (England)
24 October 2013
19:00

SC Freiburg (Germany)	1–1	(Portugal) Estoril
Darida 11'	Report	Sebá 53'

Mage Solar Stadion, Freiburg im Breisgau
Attendance: 14,500
Referee: Stanislav Todorov (Bulgaria)

7 November 2013
21:05

Sevilla (Spain)	1–1	(Czech Republic) Slovan Liberec
Perotti 29'	Report	Pavelka 71'

Ramón Sánchez Pizjuán, Seville
Attendance: 15,178
Referee: Szymon Marciniak (Poland)
7 November 2013
21:05

Estoril (Portugal)	0–0	(Germany) SC Freiburg
	Report

Estádio António Coimbra da Mota, Estoril
Attendance: 2,014
Referee: Marcin Borski (Poland)

28 November 2013
19:00

Slovan Liberec (Czech Republic)	1–2	(Germany) SC Freiburg
Rybalka 81'	Report	Ginter 23'; Coquelin 73'

Stadion u Nisy, Liberec
Attendance: 8,800
Referee: Martin Hansson (Sweden)
28 November 2013
19:00

Sevilla (Spain)	1–1	(Portugal) Estoril
Gameiro 7'	Report	Fernandes 90'

Ramón Sánchez Pizjuán, Seville
Attendance: 12,557
Referee: Anastasios Sidiropoulos (Greece)

12 December 2013
21:05

SC Freiburg (Germany)	0–2	(Spain) Sevilla
	Report	Iborra 40'; Rusescu 90+4'

Mage Solar Stadion, Freiburg im Breisgau
Attendance: 15,700
Referee: Tony Chapron (France)
12 December 2013
21:05

Estoril (Portugal)	1–2	(Czech Republic) Slovan Liberec
Sebá 82'	Report	Šural 18'; Rabušic 70'

Estádio António Coimbra da Mota, Estoril
Attendance: 1,274
Referee: Halis Özkahya (Turkey)

=== Group I ===
Pos	Team	Pld	W	D	L	GF	GA	GD	Pts	Qualification	LYO	BET	VIT	RIJ
1	(France) Lyon	6	3	3	0	6	3	+3	12	Advance to knockout phase	—	1–0	1–1	1–0
2	(Spain) Real Betis	6	2	3	1	3	2	+1	9	Advance to knockout phase	0–0	—	1–0	0–0
3	(Portugal) Vitória de Guimarães	6	1	2	3	6	5	+1	5		1–2	0–1	—	4–0
4	(Croatia) Rijeka	6	0	4	2	2	7	−5	4		1–1	1–1	0–0	—

Source: Soccerway
19 September 2013
21:05

Real Betis (Spain)	0–0	(France) Lyon
	Report

Benito Villamarín, Seville
Attendance: 22,404
Referee: Stefan Johannesson (Sweden)
19 September 2013
21:05

Vitória de Guimarães (Portugal)	4–0	(Croatia) Rijeka
Ba 36'; Plange 48'; Maâzou 68' (pen.); André 81'	Report

Estádio D. Afonso Henriques, Guimarães
Attendance: 9,794
Referee: Aleksei Kulbakov (Belarus)

3 October 2013
19:00

Rijeka (Croatia)	1–1	(Spain) Real Betis
Benko 10'	Report	Cedrick 14'

Stadion Kantrida, Rijeka
Attendance: 7,313
Referee: Serhiy Boyko (Ukraine)
3 October 2013
19:00

Lyon (France)	1–1	(Portugal) Vitória de Guimarães
Gonalons 53'	Report	Maâzou 39'

Stade de Gerland, Lyon
Attendance: 30,061
Referee: Florian Meyer (Germany)

24 October 2013
19:00

Lyon (France)	1–0	(Croatia) Rijeka
Grenier 65'	Report

Stade de Gerland, Lyon
Attendance: 30,461
Referee: Artur Soares Dias (Portugal)
24 October 2013
19:00

Real Betis (Spain)	1–0	(Portugal) Vitória de Guimarães
Vadillo 50'	Report

Benito Villamarín, Seville
Attendance: 17,100
Referee: Michael Koukoulakis (Greece)

7 November 2013
21:05

Rijeka (Croatia)	1–1	(France) Lyon
Kramarić 21'	Report	Pléa 14'

Stadion Kantrida, Rijeka
Attendance: 7,300
Referee: Alon Yefet (Israel)
7 November 2013
21:05

Vitória de Guimarães (Portugal)	0–1	(Spain) Real Betis
	Report	Chuli 90+4'

Estádio D. Afonso Henriques, Guimarães
Attendance: 22,602
Referee: Paolo Mazzoleni (Italy)

28 November 2013
19:00

Lyon (France)	1–0	(Spain) Real Betis
Gomis 66'	Report

Stade de Gerland, Lyon
Attendance: 24,112
Referee: Andre Marriner (England)
28 November 2013
19:00

Rijeka (Croatia)	0–0	(Portugal) Vitória de Guimarães
	Report

Stadion Kantrida, Rijeka
Attendance: 7,138
Referee: Kristinn Jakobsson (Iceland)

12 December 2013
21:05

Real Betis (Spain)	0–0	(Croatia) Rijeka
	Report

Benito Villamarín, Seville
Attendance: 14,556
Referee: Danny Makkelie (Netherlands)
12 December 2013
21:05

Vitória de Guimarães (Portugal)	1–2	(France) Lyon
Tómané 11'	Report	Gomis 62' (pen.); Ferri 65'

Estádio D. Afonso Henriques, Guimarães
Attendance: 5,845
Referee: Matej Jug (Slovenia)

=== Group J ===
Pos	Team	Pld	W	D	L	GF	GA	GD	Pts	Qualification	TRA	LAZ	APO	LEG
1	(Turkey) Trabzonspor	6	4	2	0	13	6	+7	14	Advance to knockout phase	—	3–3	4–2	2–0
2	(Italy) Lazio	6	3	3	0	8	4	+4	12	Advance to knockout phase	0–0	—	2–1	1–0
3	(Cyprus) Apollon Limassol	6	1	1	4	5	10	−5	4		1–2	0–0	—	0–2
4	(Poland) Legia Warsaw	6	1	0	5	2	8	−6	3		0–2	0–2	0–1	—

Source: Soccerway
19 September 2013
21:05

Apollon Limassol (Cyprus)	1–2	(Turkey) Trabzonspor
Sangoy 18' (pen.)	Report	Malouda 19'; Erdoğan 86'

GSP Stadium, Nicosia (Note: Apollon Limassol played their home matches at GSP Stadium, Nicosia instead of their regular stadium, Tsirion Stadium, Limassol.)
Attendance: 10,204
Referee: Antonio Mateu Lahoz (Spain)
19 September 2013
21:05

Lazio (Italy)	1–0	(Poland) Legia Warsaw
Hernanes 53'	Report

Stadio Olimpico, Rome
Attendance: 11,769
Referee: Kristinn Jakobsson (Iceland)

3 October 2013
19:00

Legia Warsaw (Poland)	0–1	(Cyprus) Apollon Limassol
	Report	Sangoy 56'

Pepsi Arena, Warsaw
Attendance: 100 (Note: The Legia Warsaw v Apollon Limassol match was played behind closed doors due to punishment by UEFA.)
Referee: Martin Atkinson (England)
3 October 2013
19:00

Trabzonspor (Turkey)	3–3	(Italy) Lazio
Erdoğan 12'; Mierzejewski 22'; Paulo Henrique 35'	Report	Onazi 29'; Floccari 84', 85'

Hüseyin Avni Aker Stadium, Trabzon
Attendance: 13,002
Referee: Martin Hansson (Sweden)

24 October 2013
19:00

Trabzonspor (Turkey)	2–0	(Poland) Legia Warsaw
Janko 7'; Adın 83'	Report

Hüseyin Avni Aker Stadium, Trabzon
Attendance: 12,871
Referee: Vladislav Bezborodov (Russia)
24 October 2013
19:00

Apollon Limassol (Cyprus)	0–0	(Italy) Lazio
	Report

GSP Stadium, Nicosia
Attendance: 8,943
Referee: Jorge Sousa (Portugal)

7 November 2013
21:05

Legia Warsaw (Poland)	0–2	(Turkey) Trabzonspor
	Report	Júnior 71' (o.g.); Adın 79'

Pepsi Arena, Warsaw
Attendance: 14,088
Referee: Ruddy Buquet (France)
7 November 2013
21:05

Lazio (Italy)	2–1	(Cyprus) Apollon Limassol
Floccari 14', 37'	Report	Papoulis 39'

Stadio Olimpico, Rome
Attendance: 6,498
Referee: Bobby Madden (Scotland)

28 November 2013
19:00

Trabzonspor (Turkey)	4–2	(Cyprus) Apollon Limassol
Adın 23', 61', 83'; Aydoğdu 25'	Report	Abraham 68'; Sangoy 80' (pen.)

Hüseyin Avni Aker Stadium, Trabzon
Attendance: 11,151
Referee: Manuel Gräfe (Germany)
28 November 2013
19:00

Legia Warsaw (Poland)	0–2	(Italy) Lazio
	Report	Perea 24'; Felipe Anderson 57'

Pepsi Arena, Warsaw
Attendance: 12,000
Referee: Kevin Blom (Netherlands)

12 December 2013
21:05

Apollon Limassol (Cyprus)	0–2	(Poland) Legia Warsaw
	Report	Jodłowiec 8'; Brzyski 63'

GSP Stadium, Nicosia
Attendance: 1,681
Referee: Robert Schörgenhofer (Austria)
12 December 2013
21:05

Lazio (Italy)	0–0	(Turkey) Trabzonspor
	Report

Stadio Olimpico, Rome
Attendance: 7,732
Referee: Clément Turpin (France)

=== Group K ===
Pos	Team	Pld	W	D	L	GF	GA	GD	Pts	Qualification	TOT	ANZ	SHE	TRO
1	(England) Tottenham Hotspur	6	6	0	0	15	2	+13	18	Advance to knockout phase	—	4–1	2–1	3–0
2	(Russia) Anzhi Makhachkala	6	2	2	2	4	7	−3	8	Advance to knockout phase	0–2	—	1–1	1–0
3	(Moldova) Sheriff Tiraspol	6	1	3	2	5	6	−1	6		0–2	0–0	—	2–0
4	(Norway) Tromsø	6	0	1	5	1	10	−9	1		0–2	0–1	1–1	—

Source: Soccerway
19 September 2013
21:05

Sheriff Tiraspol (Moldova)	0–0	(Russia) Anzhi Makhachkala
	Report

Sheriff Stadium, Tiraspol
Attendance: 8,882
Referee: Alan Kelly (Republic of Ireland)
19 September 2013
21:05

Tottenham Hotspur (England)	3–0	(Norway) Tromsø
Defoe 21', 29'; Eriksen 86'	Report

White Hart Lane, London
Attendance: 26,581
Referee: Libor Kovařík (Czech Republic)

3 October 2013
18:00

Anzhi Makhachkala (Russia)	0–2	(England) Tottenham Hotspur
	Report	Defoe 34'; Chadli 39'

Saturn Stadium, Ramenskoye (Note: Anzhi Makhachkala played their home matches at Saturn Stadium, Ramenskoye instead of their regular stadium, Anzhi-Arena, Makhachkala.)
Attendance: 5,662
Referee: Bülent Yıldırım (Turkey)
3 October 2013
19:00

Tromsø (Norway)	1–1	(Moldova) Sheriff Tiraspol
Ondrášek 65'	Report	Ricardinho 87'

Alfheim Stadion, Tromsø
Attendance: 3,710
Referee: Simon Lee Evans (Wales)

24 October 2013
18:00

Anzhi Makhachkala (Russia)	1–0	(Norway) Tromsø
Burmistrov 19'	Report

Saturn Stadium, Ramenskoye
Attendance: 2,797
Referee: Gediminas Mažeika (Lithuania)
24 October 2013
19:00

Sheriff Tiraspol (Moldova)	0–2	(England) Tottenham Hotspur
	Report	Vertonghen 12'; Defoe 75'

Sheriff Stadium, Tiraspol
Attendance: 11,725
Referee: Liran Liany (Israel)

7 November 2013
21:05

Tromsø (Norway)	0–1	(Russia) Anzhi Makhachkala
	Report	Mkrtchyan 90+4'

Alfheim Stadion, Tromsø
Attendance: 3,673
Referee: Danny Makkelie (Netherlands)
7 November 2013
21:05

Tottenham Hotspur (England)	2–1	(Moldova) Sheriff Tiraspol
Lamela 60'; Defoe 67' (pen.)	Report	Isa 72'

White Hart Lane, London
Attendance: 32,225
Referee: Kenn Hansen (Denmark)

28 November 2013
18:00

Anzhi Makhachkala (Russia)	1–1	(Moldova) Sheriff Tiraspol
Epureanu 58'	Report	Isa 53'

Saturn Stadium, Ramenskoye
Attendance: 2,760
Referee: Libor Kovařík (Czech Republic)
28 November 2013
19:00

Tromsø (Norway)	0–2	(England) Tottenham Hotspur
	Report	Čaušević 63' (o.g.); Dembélé 76'

Alfheim Stadion, Tromsø
Attendance: 5,868
Referee: Yevhen Aranovskiy (Ukraine)

12 December 2013
21:05

Sheriff Tiraspol (Moldova)	2–0	(Norway) Tromsø
Cadú 4'; Isa 36'	Report

Sheriff Stadium, Tiraspol
Attendance: 1,211
Referee: Sébastien Delferiere (Belgium)
12 December 2013
21:05

Tottenham Hotspur (England)	4–1	(Russia) Anzhi Makhachkala
Soldado 7', 16', 70' (pen.); Holtby 54'	Report	Ewerton 44'

White Hart Lane, London
Attendance: 23,101
Referee: Stefan Johannesson (Sweden)

=== Group L ===
Pos	Team	Pld	W	D	L	GF	GA	GD	Pts	Qualification	AZ	PAO	MHA	SHA
1	(Netherlands) AZ	6	3	3	0	8	4	+4	12 (Note: Tied on head-to-head points (2) and head-to-head goal difference (0). Head-to-head away goals: AZ 2, PAOK 1.)	Advance to knockout phase	—	1–1	2–0	1–0
2	(Greece) PAOK	6	3	3	0	10	6	+4	12	Advance to knockout phase	2–2	—	3–2	2–1
3	(Israel) Maccabi Haifa	6	1	2	3	6	9	−3	5		0–1	0–0	—	2–1
4	(Kazakhstan) Shakhter Karagandy	6	0	2	4	5	10	−5	2		1–1	0–2	2–2	—

Source: Soccerway
Notes:
19 September 2013
21:05

PAOK (Greece)	2–1	(Kazakhstan) Shakhter Karagandy
Athanasiadis 75'; Vukić 90+2'	Report	Cañas 50' (pen.)

Toumba Stadium, Thessaloniki
Attendance: 255 (Note: The PAOK v Shakhter Karagandy match was played behind closed doors due to punishment by UEFA.)
Referee: Fredy Fautrel (France)
19 September 2013
21:05

Maccabi Haifa (Israel)	0–1	(Netherlands) AZ
	Report	Guðmundsson 70'

Kiryat Eliezer Stadium, Haifa
Attendance: 10,000
Referee: Robert Schörgenhofer (Austria)

3 October 2013
18:00

Shakhter Karagandy (Kazakhstan)	2–2	(Israel) Maccabi Haifa
Finonchenko 40'; Tarasov 45'	Report	Ezra 54'; Turgeman 79'

Astana Arena, Astana (Note: Shakhter Karagandy played their home matches at Astana Arena, Astana instead of their regular stadium, Shakhtyor Stadium, Karaganda.)
Attendance: 19,100
Referee: István Vad (Hungary)
3 October 2013
19:00

AZ (Netherlands)	1–1	(Greece) PAOK
Gouweleeuw 82'	Report	Salpingidis 90+3'

AFAS Stadion, Alkmaar
Attendance: 10,761
Referee: Luca Banti (Italy)

24 October 2013
18:00

Shakhter Karagandy (Kazakhstan)	1–1	(Netherlands) AZ
Finonchenko 11'	Report	Guðmundsson 26'

Astana Arena, Astana
Attendance: 10,500
Referee: Yevhen Aranovskiy (Ukraine)
24 October 2013
19:00

PAOK (Greece)	3–2	(Israel) Maccabi Haifa
Vítor 35'; Ninis 39'; Salpingidis 67'	Report	Ndlovu 13'; Golasa 21'

Toumba Stadium, Thessaloniki
Attendance: 14,211
Referee: Fernando Teixeira Vitienes (Spain)

7 November 2013
21:05

AZ (Netherlands)	1–0	(Kazakhstan) Shakhter Karagandy
Ortiz 55'	Report

AFAS Stadion, Alkmaar
Attendance: 9,778
Referee: Martin Hansson (Sweden)
7 November 2013
21:05

Maccabi Haifa (Israel)	0–0	(Greece) PAOK
	Report

Kiryat Eliezer Stadium, Haifa
Attendance: 10,000
Referee: Felix Zwayer (Germany)

28 November 2013
16:00

Shakhter Karagandy (Kazakhstan)	0–2	(Greece) PAOK
	Report	Đidić 54' (o.g.); Kitsiou 90+2'

Astana Arena, Astana
Attendance: 7,556
Referee: Serge Gumienny (Belgium)
28 November 2013
19:00

AZ (Netherlands)	2–0	(Israel) Maccabi Haifa
Gudelj 37'; Guðmundsson 90+5'	Report

AFAS Stadion, Alkmaar
Attendance: 11,211
Referee: Aleksei Kulbakov (Belarus)

12 December 2013
21:05

PAOK (Greece)	2–2	(Netherlands) AZ
Lucas 37' (pen.); Pozoglou 90+4'	Report	Lam 31'; Gorter 71' (pen.)

Toumba Stadium, Thessaloniki
Attendance: 11,211
Referee: Michael Oliver (England)
12 December 2013
21:05

Maccabi Haifa (Israel)	2–1	(Kazakhstan) Shakhter Karagandy
Gozlan 72'; Abuhatzira 80'	Report	Cañas 44' (pen.)

Kiryat Eliezer Stadium, Haifa
Attendance: 2,100
Referee: Gediminas Mažeika (Lithuania)
