= 2013–14 UEFA Europa League qualifying (third and play-off round matches) =

European football competition

This page summarises the matches of the third qualifying and play-off rounds of 2013–14 UEFA Europa League qualifying.

Times are CEST (UTC+2), as listed by UEFA (local times, if different, are in parentheses).

== Third qualifying round ==
=== Summary ===
The first legs were played on 1 August, and the second legs were played on 8 August 2013.

Team 1	Agg.	Team 2	1st leg	2nd leg
Chornomorets Odesa (Ukraine)	3–1	(Serbia) Red Star Belgrade	3–1	0–0
Široki Brijeg (Bosnia and Herzegovina)	1–7	(Italy) Udinese	1–3	0–4
Ventspils (Latvia)	0–3	(Israel) Maccabi Haifa	0–0	0–3
Dinamo Minsk (Belarus)	0–1	(Turkey) Trabzonspor	0–1	0–0
Śląsk Wrocław (Poland)	4–3	(Belgium) Club Brugge	1–0	3–3
Trenčín (Slovakia)	3–5	(Romania) Astra Giurgiu	1–3	2–2
Swansea City (England)	4–0	(Sweden) Malmö FF	4–0	0–0
Petrolul Ploiești (Romania)	3–2	(Netherlands) Vitesse	1–1	2–1
Slovan Liberec (Czech Republic)	4–2	(Switzerland) Zürich	2–1	2–1
Aktobe (Kazakhstan)	1–1 (2–1 p)	(Iceland) Breiðablik	1–0	0–1 (a.e.t.)
Randers (Denmark)	1–4	(Russia) Rubin Kazan	1–2	0–2
Žalgiris (Lithuania)	2–2 (a)	(Poland) Lech Poznań	1–0	1–2
Sevilla (Spain)	9–1	(Montenegro) Mladost Podgorica	3–0	6–1
Hajduk Split (Croatia)	0–2	(Georgia (country)) Dila Gori	0–1	0–1
Kukësi (Albania)	2–1	(Ukraine) Metalurh Donetsk	2–0	0–1
Pandurii Târgu Jiu (Romania)	3–2	(Israel) Hapoel Tel Aviv	1–1	2–1
Tromsø (Norway)	1–1 (4–3 p)	(Luxembourg) Differdange 03	1–0	0–1 (a.e.t.)
Motherwell (Scotland)	0–3	(Russia) Kuban Krasnodar	0–2	0–1
Saint-Étienne (France)	6–0	(Moldova) Milsami Orhei	3–0	3–0
Jablonec (Czech Republic)	5–2	(Norway) Strømsgodset	2–1	3–1
Qarabağ (Azerbaijan)	3–0	(Sweden) Gefle IF	1–0	2–0
Rijeka (Croatia)	3–2	(Slovakia) Žilina	2–1	1–1
Asteras Tripolis (Greece)	2–4	(Austria) Rapid Wien	1–1	1–3
Botev Plovdiv (Bulgaria)	1–1 (a)	(Germany) VfB Stuttgart	1–1	0–0
Estoril (Portugal)	1–0	(Israel) Hapoel Ramat Gan	0–0	1–0
Vojvodina (Serbia)	5–2	(Turkey) Bursaspor	2–2	3–0
Skoda Xanthi (Greece)	2–4	(Belgium) Standard Liège	1–2	1–2
BK Häcken (Sweden)	1–3	(Switzerland) Thun	1–2	0–1
Minsk (Belarus)	1–1 (3–2 p)	(Scotland) St Johnstone	0–1	1–0 (a.e.t.)

=== Matches ===
1 August 2013
18:15

Chornomorets Odesa (Ukraine)	3–1	(Serbia) Red Star Belgrade
Riera 32'; Dja Djédjé 38'; Antonov 78' (pen.)	Report	Savićević 59'

Chornomorets Stadium, Odesa
Attendance: 28,862
Referee: Kenn Hansen (Denmark)
8 August 2013
20:30

Red Star Belgrade (Serbia)	0–0	(Ukraine) Chornomorets Odesa
	Report

Red Star Stadium, Belgrade
Attendance: 39,730
Referee: Artur Soares Dias (Portugal)

Chornomorets Odesa won 3–1 on aggregate.

1 August 2013
20:45

Široki Brijeg (Bosnia and Herzegovina)	1–3	(Italy) Udinese
Ćorić 77'	Report	Di Natale 16'; Muriel 31', 39'

Bilino Polje Stadium, Zenica
Attendance: 4,500
Referee: Halis Özkahya (Turkey)
8 August 2013
20:45

Udinese (Italy)	4–0	(Bosnia and Herzegovina) Široki Brijeg
Di Natale 9'; Lazzari 82'; Basta 86'; Vydra 90+3'	Report

Stadio Nereo Rocco, Trieste
Attendance: 4,326
Referee: Antti Munukka (Finland)

Udinese won 7–1 on aggregate.

1 August 2013
18:00

Ventspils (Latvia)	0–0	(Israel) Maccabi Haifa
	Report

Skonto Stadium, Riga
Attendance: 2,800
Referee: Marco Borg (Malta)
8 August 2013
18:30

Maccabi Haifa (Israel)	3–0	(Latvia) Ventspils
Smirnovs 35' (o.g.); Rayo 41', 53'	Report

Kiryat Eliezer, Haifa
Attendance: 10,800
Referee: Michael Lerjéus (Sweden)

Maccabi Haifa won 3–0 on aggregate.

1 August 2013
18:00

Dinamo Minsk (Belarus)	0–1	(Turkey) Trabzonspor
	Report	Paulo Henrique 41'

OSK Brestskiy, Brest
Attendance: 7,500
Referee: Rene Eisner (Austria)
8 August 2013
20:00

Trabzonspor (Turkey)	0–0	(Belarus) Dinamo Minsk
	Report

Hüseyin Avni Aker, Trabzon
Attendance: 22,803
Referee: Stephan Studer (Switzerland)

Trabzonspor won 1–0 on aggregate.

1 August 2013
20:45

Śląsk Wrocław (Poland)	1–0	(Belgium) Club Brugge
Plaku 64'	Report

Stadion Miejski, Wrocław
Attendance: 17,132
Referee: Anthony Taylor (England)
8 August 2013
20:45

Club Brugge (Belgium)	3–3	(Poland) Śląsk Wrocław
Refaelov 58'; Duarte 80'; De Sutter 90+1'	Report	Sobota 9', 76'; Paixão 60'

Jan Breydel Stadium, Bruges
Attendance: 25,945
Referee: Miroslav Zelinka (Czech Republic)

Śląsk Wrocław won 4–3 on aggregate.

1 August 2013
17:00

Trenčín (Slovakia)	1–3	(Romania) Astra Giurgiu
Holúbek 82'	Report	Budescu 8'; Tembo 49'; Fatai 51'

Štadión Zimný, Dubnica nad Váhom
Attendance: 4,271
Referee: Christian Dingert (Germany)
8 August 2013
18:00

Astra Giurgiu (Romania)	2–2	(Slovakia) Trenčín
Ivanovski 86'; Tembo 89'	Report	Adi 83'; Van Kessel 88'

Arena Națională, Bucharest
Attendance: 1,440
Referee: Ruddy Buquet (France)

Astra Giurgiu won 5–3 on aggregate.

1 August 2013
20:45

Swansea City (England)	4–0	(Sweden) Malmö FF
Michu 37'; Bony 55', 59'; Pozuelo 86'	Report

Liberty Stadium, Swansea
Attendance: 16,176
Referee: Paolo Mazzoleni (Italy)
8 August 2013
19:45

Malmö FF (Sweden)	0–0	(England) Swansea City
	Report

Swedbank Stadion, Malmö
Attendance: 11,538
Referee: Serdar Gözübüyük (Netherlands)

Swansea City won 4–0 on aggregate.

1 August 2013
18:00

Petrolul Ploiești (Romania)	1–1	(Netherlands) Vitesse
Grozav 84'	Report	Reis 52' (pen.)

Stadionul Ilie Oană, Ploiești
Attendance: 11,827
Referee: Carlos del Cerro Grande (Spain)
8 August 2013
20:00

Vitesse (Netherlands)	1–2	(Romania) Petrolul Ploiești
Van der Heijden 72'	Report	Boudjemaa 21'; Grozav 90+5'

GelreDome, Arnhem
Attendance: 10,088
Referee: Ante Vučemilović-Šimunović Jr. (Croatia)

Petrolul Ploiești won 3–2 on aggregate.

1 August 2013
20:15

Slovan Liberec (Czech Republic)	2–1	(Switzerland) Zürich
Rabušic 66', 81'	Report	Chiumiento 5' (pen.)

Stadion u Nisy, Liberec
Attendance: 7,780
Referee: Liran Liany (Israel)
8 August 2013
19:30

Zürich (Switzerland)	1–2	(Czech Republic) Slovan Liberec
Chermiti 17'	Report	Frýdek 64'; Rybalka 85'

Letzigrund, Zürich
Attendance: 5,915
Referee: Martin Strömbergsson (Sweden)

Slovan Liberec won 4–2 on aggregate.

1 August 2013
18:00

Aktobe (Kazakhstan)	1–0	(Iceland) Breiðablik
Khairullin 90' (pen.)	Report

Aktobe Central Stadium, Aktobe
Attendance: 12,200
Referee: Libor Kovařík (Czech Republic)
8 August 2013
22:00

Breiðablik (Iceland)	1–0 (a.e.t.)	(Kazakhstan) Aktobe
Margeirsson 27'	Report
Penalties
Ingason (penalty missed); Lýðsson (penalty missed); K. Jónsson (penalty missed); Rohde (penalty scored); Troost (penalty missed)	1–2	(penalty missed) Badlo; (penalty missed) Khairullin; (penalty scored) Kenzhesariev; (penalty scored) Kapadze

Laugardalsvöllur, Reykjavík
Attendance: 2,449
Referee: Sébastien Delferiere (Belgium)

1–1 on aggregate; Aktobe won 2–1 on penalties.

1 August 2013
18:30

Randers (Denmark)	1–2	(Russia) Rubin Kazan
Borring 61'	Report	Torbinski 12'; Rondón 42'

AutoC Park Randers, Randers
Attendance: 3,153
Referee: Fernando Teixeira Vitienes (Spain)
8 August 2013
18:00

Rubin Kazan (Russia)	2–0	(Denmark) Randers
Navas 18'; Eremenko 86'	Report

Central Stadium, Kazan
Attendance: 5,012
Referee: Kevin Clancy (Scotland)

Rubin Kazan won 4–1 on aggregate.

1 August 2013
18:30

Žalgiris (Lithuania)	1–0	(Poland) Lech Poznań
Kuklys 44'	Report

LFF Stadium, Vilnius
Attendance: 4,300
Referee: Vlado Glođović (Serbia)
8 August 2013
19:00

Lech Poznań (Poland)	2–1	(Lithuania) Žalgiris
Teodorczyk 87'; Perić 90' (o.g.)	Report	Leliūga 29'

INEA Stadion, Poznań
Attendance: 16,326
Referee: Ken Henry Johnsen (Norway)

2–2 on aggregate; Žalgiris won on away goals.

1 August 2013
21:30

Sevilla (Spain)	3–0	(Montenegro) Mladost Podgorica
Bacca 18'; Perotti 82' (pen.); Carriço 90+1'	Report

Ramón Sánchez Pizjuán, Seville
Attendance: 27,548
Referee: Slavko Vinčić (Slovenia)
8 August 2013
20:30

Mladost Podgorica (Montenegro)	1–6	(Spain) Sevilla
Pavićević 90+1'	Report	Vitolo 10'; Rusescu 23', 39'; Rabello 33'; Coke 37', 60'

Podgorica City Stadium, Podgorica
Attendance: 3,500
Referee: Yevhen Aranovskiy (Ukraine)

Sevilla won 9–1 on aggregate.

1 August 2013
21:00

Hajduk Split (Croatia)	0–1	(Georgia (country)) Dila Gori
	Report	Iluridze 24'

Stadion Poljud, Split
Attendance: 28,000
Referee: Eitan Shemeulevitch (Israel)
8 August 2013
18:00

Dila Gori (Georgia (country))	1–0	(Croatia) Hajduk Split
Dolidze 82'	Report

Mikheil Meskhi Stadium, Tbilisi
Attendance: 13,891
Referee: Tamás Bognár (Hungary)

Dila Gori won 2–0 on aggregate.

1 August 2013
19:30

Kukësi (Albania)	2–0	(Ukraine) Metalurh Donetsk
Malacarne 6'; Malota 83'	Report

Qemal Stafa Stadium, Tirana (Note: Kukësi played their home matches at Qemal Stafa Stadium, Tirana, instead of their regular stadium Zeqir Ymeri Stadium, Kukës, as it did not meet UEFA requirements.)
Attendance: 7,000
Referee: Artyom Kuchin (Kazakhstan)
8 August 2013
18:15

Metalurh Donetsk (Ukraine)	1–0	(Albania) Kukësi
Dimitrov 27'	Report

Metalurh Stadium, Donetsk
Attendance: 3,000
Referee: Bülent Yıldırım (Turkey)

Kukësi won 2–1 on aggregate.

1 August 2013
20:00

Pandurii Târgu Jiu (Romania)	1–1	(Israel) Hapoel Tel Aviv
Nistor 4'	Report	Sasha 29'

Cluj Arena, Cluj-Napoca
Attendance: 4,996
Referee: Vitali Meshkov (Russia)
8 August 2013
19:00

Hapoel Tel Aviv (Israel)	1–2	(Romania) Pandurii Târgu Jiu
Damari 21' (pen.)	Report	Eric 34'; Ciucur 50'

Bloomfield Stadium, Tel Aviv
Attendance: 6,700
Referee: Paolo Valeri (Italy)

Pandurii Târgu Jiu won 3–2 on aggregate.

1 August 2013
19:00

Tromsø (Norway)	1–0	(Luxembourg) Differdange 03
Ondrášek 76'	Report

Alfheim Stadion, Tromsø
Attendance: 2,135
Referee: Anar Salmanov (Azerbaijan)
8 August 2013
19:30

Differdange 03 (Luxembourg)	1–0 (a.e.t.)	(Norway) Tromsø
Er Rafik 46'	Report
Penalties
Caron (penalty scored); Jänisch (penalty missed); Franzoni (penalty scored); Luisi (penalty scored); Lebresne (penalty missed)	3–4	(penalty missed) Drage; (penalty scored) Ondrášek; (penalty scored) Johansen; (penalty scored) Pritchard; (penalty scored) Nystrøm

Stade Municipal de la Ville de Differdange, Differdange
Attendance: 1,960
Referee: Kristo Tohver (Estonia)

1–1 on aggregate; Tromsø won 4–3 on penalties.

1 August 2013
20:45

Motherwell (Scotland)	0–2	(Russia) Kuban Krasnodar
	Report	Popov 52', 78'

Fir Park, Motherwell
Attendance: 6,748
Referee: Alain Bieri (Switzerland)
8 August 2013
19:00

Kuban Krasnodar (Russia)	1–0	(Scotland) Motherwell
McManus 50' (o.g.)	Report

Kuban Stadium, Krasnodar
Attendance: 31,754
Referee: Cristian Balaj (Romania)

Kuban Krasnodar won 3–0 on aggregate.

1 August 2013
20:30

Saint-Étienne (France)	3–0	(Moldova) Milsami Orhei
Brandão 3', 82'; Cohade 21'	Report

Stade Geoffroy-Guichard, Saint-Étienne
Attendance: 25,000
Referee: Padraig Sutton (Republic of Ireland)
8 August 2013
19:00

Milsami Orhei (Moldova)	0–3	(France) Saint-Étienne
	Report	Brandão 29'; Hamouma 39'; Nicoliță 69'

Zimbru Stadium, Chișinău
Attendance: 3,027
Referee: Ilias Spathas (Greece)

Saint-Étienne won 6–0 on aggregate.

1 August 2013
18:00

Jablonec (Czech Republic)	2–1	(Norway) Strømsgodset
Piták 17' (pen.); Vošahlík 90+1'	Report	Beneš 39' (o.g.)

Chance Arena, Jablonec nad Nisou
Attendance: 4,285
Referee: Leontios Trattou (Cyprus)
8 August 2013
20:00

Strømsgodset (Norway)	1–3	(Czech Republic) Jablonec
Kamara 71'	Report	Hubník 15'; Vaněk 81'; Piták 90'

Marienlyst Stadion, Drammen
Attendance: 4,439
Referee: Gediminas Mažeika (Lithuania)

Jablonec won 5–2 on aggregate.

1 August 2013
18:00

Qarabağ (Azerbaijan)	1–0	(Sweden) Gefle IF
Reynaldo 89'	Report

Tofiq Bahramov Stadium, Baku
Attendance: 22,000
Referee: Nicolas Rainville (France)
8 August 2013
19:00

Gefle IF (Sweden)	0–2	(Azerbaijan) Qarabağ
	Report	Chumbinho 41'; Reynaldo 50'

Norrporten Arena, Sundsvall
Attendance: 1,137
Referee: Stephan Klossner (Switzerland)

Qarabağ won 3–0 on aggregate.

1 August 2013
19:00

Rijeka (Croatia)	2–1	(Slovakia) Žilina
Sharbini 3'; Kvržić 59'	Report	Majtán 74'

Stadion Kantrida, Rijeka
Attendance: 7,000
Referee: Marco Fritz (Germany)
8 August 2013
17:30

Žilina (Slovakia)	1–1	(Croatia) Rijeka
Mihálik 89'	Report	Pokrivač 50'

Štadión pod Dubňom, Žilina
Attendance: 6,319
Referee: Antonio Damato (Italy)

Rijeka won 3–2 on aggregate.

1 August 2013
20:30

Asteras Tripolis (Greece)	1–1	(Austria) Rapid Wien
Zisopoulos 27'	Report	Boyd 32' (pen.)

Kolokotronis Stadium, Tripoli
Attendance: 5,000
Referee: Kevin Blom (Netherlands)
8 August 2013
20:30

Rapid Wien (Austria)	3–1	(Greece) Asteras Tripolis
Petsos 26'; Schaub 62', 85'	Report	Grazzini 57'

Gerhard Hanappi Stadium, Vienna
Attendance: 15,300
Referee: Simon Lee Evans (Wales)

Rapid Wien won 4–2 on aggregate.

1 August 2013
19:30

Botev Plovdiv (Bulgaria)	1–1	(Germany) VfB Stuttgart
Domovchiyski 73'	Report	Ibišević 67'

Lazur Stadium, Burgas
Attendance: 10,000
Referee: Lee Probert (England)
8 August 2013
20:20

VfB Stuttgart (Germany)	0–0	(Bulgaria) Botev Plovdiv
	Report

Comtech Arena, Aspach
Attendance: 7,000
Referee: Ján Valášek (Slovakia)

1–1 on aggregate; VfB Stuttgart won on away goals.

1 August 2013
21:00

Estoril (Portugal)	0–0	(Israel) Hapoel Ramat Gan
	Report

Estádio António Coimbra da Mota, Estoril
Attendance: 2,584
Referee: Fredy Fautrel (France)
8 August 2013
19:00

Hapoel Ramat Gan (Israel)	0–1	(Portugal) Estoril
	Report	Evandro 11' (pen.)

Ramat Gan Stadium, Ramat Gan
Attendance: 1,360
Referee: Anastasios Sidiropoulos (Greece)

Estoril won 1–0 on aggregate.

1 August 2013
20:00

Vojvodina (Serbia)	2–2	(Turkey) Bursaspor
Vulićević 71'; Oumarou 81'	Report	Batalla 36' (pen.); Taiwo 90'

Karađorđe Stadium, Novi Sad
Attendance: 6,500
Referee: Steven McLean (Scotland)
8 August 2013
19:30

Bursaspor (Turkey)	0–3	(Serbia) Vojvodina
	Report	Oumarou 9'; Vranješ 29'; Kaluđerović 83'

Bursa Atatürk Stadium, Bursa
Attendance: 19,130
Referee: Javier Estrada Fernández (Spain)

Vojvodina won 5–2 on aggregate.

1 August 2013
20:30

Skoda Xanthi (Greece)	1–2	(Belgium) Standard Liège
Dié 36'	Report	Mujangi Bia 18'; Ciman 74'

Skoda Xanthi Arena, Xanthi
Attendance: 4,000
Referee: Sascha Kever (Switzerland)
8 August 2013
20:30

Standard Liège (Belgium)	2–1	(Greece) Skoda Xanthi
Bulot 53'; De Camargo 70'	Report	De Guzman 84'

Stade Maurice Dufrasne, Liège
Attendance: 24,706
Referee: Jakob Kehlet (Denmark)

Standard Liège won 4–2 on aggregate.

1 August 2013
19:00

BK Häcken (Sweden)	1–2	(Switzerland) Thun
Ericsson 64'	Report	Zuffi 33', 63'

Gamla Ullevi, Gothenburg
Attendance: 2,802
Referee: Mattias Gestranius (Finland)
8 August 2013
19:30

Thun (Switzerland)	1–0	(Sweden) BK Häcken
Sanogo Junior 69'	Report

Arena Thun, Thun
Attendance: 5,027
Referee: Arnold Hunter (Northern Ireland)

Thun won 3–1 on aggregate.

1 August 2013
18:00

Minsk (Belarus)	0–1	(Scotland) St Johnstone
	Report	MacLean 69'

Neman Stadium, Grodno
Attendance: 2,900
Referee: Marcin Borski (Poland)
8 August 2013
20:45

St Johnstone (Scotland)	0–1 (a.e.t.)	(Belarus) Minsk
	Report	Rnić 75'
Penalties
Mackay (penalty missed); Cregg (penalty missed); Fallon (penalty scored); Edwards (penalty scored); MacLean (penalty missed)	2–3	(penalty scored) Vasilyuk; (penalty scored) Razin; (penalty scored) Sverchinskiy; (penalty missed) Kibuk; (penalty missed) Kazeka

McDiarmid Park, Perth
Attendance: 8,594
Referee: Pavle Radovanović (Montenegro)

1–1 on aggregate; Minsk won 3–2 on penalties.

== Play-off round ==
=== Summary ===
The first legs were played on 22 August, and the second legs were played on 29 August 2013.

Team 1	Agg.	Team 2	1st leg	2nd leg
Kuban Krasnodar (Russia)	3–1	(Netherlands) Feyenoord	1–0	2–1
Zulte Waregem (Belgium)	3–2 (Note: Following the completion of the play-offs, APOEL were drawn as the lucky loser to advance to the group stage (replacing the spot vacated by Fenerbahçe).)	(Cyprus) APOEL	1–1	2–1
Rapid Wien (Austria)	4–0	(Georgia (country)) Dila Gori	1–0	3–0
Tromsø (Norway)	2–3	(Turkey) Beşiktaş	2–1	0–2
Pandurii Târgu Jiu (Romania)	2–1	(Portugal) Braga	0–1	2–0 (a.e.t.)
Apollon Limassol (Cyprus)	2–1	(France) Nice	2–0	0–1
Aktobe (Kazakhstan)	3–8	(Ukraine) Dynamo Kyiv	2–3	1–5
Swansea City (England)	6–3	(Romania) Petrolul Ploiești	5–1	1–2
Atromitos (Greece)	3–3 (a)	(Netherlands) AZ	1–3	2–0
FH (Iceland)	2–7	(Belgium) Genk	0–2	2–5
IF Elfsborg (Sweden)	2–1	(Denmark) Nordsjælland	1–1	1–0
Sevilla (Spain)	9–1 (Note: Order of legs reversed after original draw.)	(Poland) Śląsk Wrocław	4–1	5–0
Red Bull Salzburg (Austria)	7–0	(Lithuania) Žalgiris	5–0	2–0
Qarabağ (Azerbaijan)	1–4	(Germany) Eintracht Frankfurt	0–2	1–2
Minsk (Belarus)	1–5	(Belgium) Standard Liège	0–2	1–3
Jablonec (Czech Republic)	1–8	(Spain) Real Betis	1–2	0–6
Rijeka (Croatia)	4–3	(Germany) VfB Stuttgart	2–1	2–2
Chornomorets Odesa (Ukraine)	1–1 (7–6 p)	(Albania) Skënderbeu	1–0	0–1 (a.e.t.)
Maccabi Tel Aviv (Israel)	w/o (Note: On 14 August 2013, Metalist Kharkiv were disqualified from all 2013–14 UEFA club competitions because of previous match-fixing. UEFA decided to replace Metalist Kharkiv in the Champions League play-off round with PAOK, who were eliminated by Metalist Kharkiv in the third qualifying round of the Champions League. PAOK therefore vacated their place in the Europa League, and Maccabi Tel Aviv, the opponent drawn against PAOK in the Europa League play-off round, qualified directly for the Europa League group stage.)	(Greece) PAOK	Canc.	Canc.
St. Gallen (Switzerland)	5–3	(Russia) Spartak Moscow	1–1	4–2
Molde (Norway)	0–5	(Russia) Rubin Kazan	0–2	0–3
Vojvodina (Serbia)	2–3	(Moldova) Sheriff Tiraspol	1–1	1–2
Kukësi (Albania)	1–5	(Turkey) Trabzonspor	0–2	1–3
Esbjerg (Denmark)	5–3	(France) Saint-Étienne	4–3	1–0
Grasshopper (Switzerland)	2–2 (a)	(Italy) Fiorentina	1–2	1–0
Maccabi Haifa (Israel)	3–1	(Romania) Astra Giurgiu	2–0	1–1
Udinese (Italy)	2–4	(Czech Republic) Slovan Liberec	1–3	1–1
Dinamo Tbilisi (Georgia (country))	0–8	(England) Tottenham Hotspur	0–5	0–3
Estoril (Portugal)	4–1	(Austria) Pasching	2–0	2–1
Nõmme Kalju (Estonia)	1–5	(Ukraine) Dnipro Dnipropetrovsk	1–3	0–2
Partizan (Serbia)	1–3	(Switzerland) Thun	1–0	0–3

=== Matches ===
22 August 2013
18:00

Kuban Krasnodar (Russia)	1–0	(Netherlands) Feyenoord
Baldé 60'	Report

Kuban Stadium, Krasnodar
Attendance: 32,275
Referee: Clément Turpin (France)
29 August 2013
21:00

Feyenoord (Netherlands)	1–2	(Russia) Kuban Krasnodar
Pellè 7'	Report	Popov 19'; Bucur 50'

De Kuip, Rotterdam
Attendance: 45,000
Referee: Michael Oliver (England)

Kuban Krasnodar won 3–1 on aggregate.

22 August 2013
20:45

Zulte Waregem (Belgium)	1–1	(Cyprus) APOEL
Malanda 21'	Report	Alexandrou 88'

Constant Vanden Stock Stadium, Brussels
Attendance: 5,095
Referee: Marijo Strahonja (Croatia)
29 August 2013
19:00

APOEL (Cyprus)	1–2	(Belgium) Zulte Waregem
Aloneftis 52'	Report	Habibou 12'; Naessens 90'

GSP Stadium, Nicosia
Attendance: 18,959
Referee: Andre Marriner (England)

Zulte Waregem won 3–2 on aggregate.

22 August 2013
21:05

Rapid Wien (Austria)	1–0	(Georgia (country)) Dila Gori
Schaub 42'	Report

Gerhard Hanappi Stadion, Vienna
Attendance: 14,500
Referee: Stefan Johannesson (Sweden)
29 August 2013
18:00

Dila Gori (Georgia (country))	0–3	(Austria) Rapid Wien
	Report	Schaub 45+1'; Sabitzer 63'; Behrendt 90'

Mikheil Meskhi Stadium, Tbilisi
Attendance: 19,012
Referee: Cristian Balaj (Romania)

Rapid Wien won 4–0 on aggregate.

22 August 2013
20:00

Tromsø (Norway)	2–1	(Turkey) Beşiktaş
Bendiksen 49' (pen.); Pritchard 68'	Report	Almeida 9'

Alfheim Stadion, Tromsø
Attendance: 4,528
Referee: Alan Kelly (Republic of Ireland)
29 August 2013
19:30

Beşiktaş (Turkey)	2–0	(Norway) Tromsø
Almeida 52'; Özyakup 54'	Report

Atatürk Olympic Stadium, Istanbul
Attendance: 44,578
Referee: Marcin Borski (Poland)

Beşiktaş won 3–2 on aggregate.

22 August 2013
20:00

Pandurii Târgu Jiu (Romania)	0–1	(Portugal) Braga
	Report	Yazalde 51'

Cluj Arena, Cluj-Napoca
Attendance: 11,500
Referee: Florian Meyer (Germany)
29 August 2013
21:30

Braga (Portugal)	0–2 (a.e.t.)	(Romania) Pandurii Târgu Jiu
	Report	Buleică 15'; Ciucur 117'

Estádio Municipal, Braga
Attendance: 11,312
Referee: Liran Liany (Israel)

Pandurii Târgu Jiu won 2–1 on aggregate.

22 August 2013
20:00

Apollon Limassol (Cyprus)	2–0	(France) Nice
Sangoy 54', 63'	Report

GSP Stadium, Nicosia
Attendance: 7,157
Referee: Ivan Kružliak (Slovakia)
29 August 2013
20:00

Nice (France)	1–0	(Cyprus) Apollon Limassol
Cvitanich 4'	Report

Stade Léo-Lagrange, Nice
Attendance: 12,219
Referee: Viktor Kassai (Hungary)

Apollon Limassol won 2–1 on aggregate.

22 August 2013
15:00

Aktobe (Kazakhstan)	2–3	(Ukraine) Dynamo Kyiv
Trémoulinas 37' (o.g.); Khairullin 65'	Report	Yarmolenko 16'; Brown 52'; Belhanda 57'

Aktobe Central Stadium, Aktobe
Attendance: 12,500
Referee: Aleksei Kulbakov (Belarus)
29 August 2013
18:00

Dynamo Kyiv (Ukraine)	5–1	(Kazakhstan) Aktobe
Lens 9'; Bezus 30'; Mbokani 36'; Ideye 52' (pen.); Husyev 73'	Report	Geynrikh 37' (pen.)

Olympic Stadium, Kyiv
Attendance: 70 (Note: The Dynamo Kyiv v Aktobe match was played behind closed doors due to the punishment handed to Dynamo Kyiv by UEFA following racist behaviour during 2012–13 games against Paris Saint-Germain and Bordeaux.)
Referee: Stephan Studer (Switzerland)

Dynamo Kyiv won 8–3 on aggregate.

22 August 2013
20:05

Swansea City (England)	5–1	(Romania) Petrolul Ploiești
Routledge 14', 25'; Michu 22'; Bony 59'; Pozuelo 70'	Report	Grozav 87'

Liberty Stadium, Swansea
Attendance: 12,590
Referee: Sergei Karasev (Russia)
29 August 2013
19:30

Petrolul Ploiești (Romania)	2–1	(England) Swansea City
Priso 73'; Younés 83'	Report	Lamah 74'

Stadionul Ilie Oană, Ploiești
Attendance: 12,880
Referee: Michael Koukoulakis (Greece)

Swansea City won 6–3 on aggregate.

22 August 2013
18:30

Atromitos (Greece)	1–3	(Netherlands) AZ
Papadopoulos 76' (pen.)	Report	Guðmundsson 51', 90+3'; Jóhannsson 73'

Peristeri Stadium, Peristeri
Attendance: 8,500
Referee: David Fernández Borbalán (Spain)
29 August 2013 (Note: The match was abandoned after 59 minutes due to a fire at the stadium, and was resumed on 30 August 2013, 11:00, from the point of abandonment.)
19:00

AZ (Netherlands)	0–2	(Greece) Atromitos
	Report	Papadopoulos 53'; Karagounis 75'

AFAS Stadion, Alkmaar
Attendance: 11,569
Referee: Antony Gautier (France)

3–3 on aggregate; AZ won on away goals.

22 August 2013
20:00

FH (Iceland)	0–2	(Belgium) Genk
	Report	Vossen 44'; Tillen 79' (o.g.)

Kaplakriki, Hafnarfjörður
Attendance: 2,400
Referee: Paweł Gil (Poland)
29 August 2013
20:00

Genk (Belgium)	5–2	(Iceland) FH
Vossen 5'; Kara 52'; Limbombe 57'; Camus 59', 78'	Report	Snorrason 27'; Sverrisson 48'

Cristal Arena, Genk
Attendance: 7,285
Referee: Leontios Trattou (Cyprus)

Genk won 7–2 on aggregate.

22 August 2013
20:00

IF Elfsborg (Sweden)	1–1	(Denmark) Nordsjælland
J. Larsson 74'	Report	Nordstrand 34'

Borås Arena, Borås
Attendance: 5,330
Referee: Fernando Teixeira Vitienes (Spain)
29 August 2013
18:00

Nordsjælland (Denmark)	0–1	(Sweden) IF Elfsborg
	Report	Beckmann 71'

Farum Park, Farum
Attendance: 4,621
Referee: Felix Zwayer (Germany)

IF Elfsborg won 2–1 on aggregate.

22 August 2013
21:30

Sevilla (Spain)	4–1	(Poland) Śląsk Wrocław
Rakitić 36'; Marin 67', 89'; Gameiro 85'	Report	Paixão 16'

Ramón Sánchez Pizjuán, Seville
Attendance: 16,758
Referee: Manuel Gräfe (Germany)
29 August 2013
20:45

Śląsk Wrocław (Poland)	0–5	(Spain) Sevilla
	Report	Rakitić 22'; Bacca 38', 87'; Jairo 71'; Perotti 78'

Stadion Miejski, Wrocław
Attendance: 41,955
Referee: Fırat Aydınus (Turkey)

Sevilla won 9–1 on aggregate.

22 August 2013
19:00

Red Bull Salzburg (Austria)	5–0	(Lithuania) Žalgiris
Soriano 29', 37', 63'; Mané 40'; Hinteregger 68'	Report

Red Bull Arena, Wals-Siezenheim
Attendance: 7,885
Referee: Aleksandar Stavrev (Macedonia)
29 August 2013
20:30

Žalgiris (Lithuania)	0–2	(Austria) Red Bull Salzburg
	Report	Kampl 60'; Meilinger 74'

LFF Stadium, Vilnius
Attendance: 4,700
Referee: Fredy Fautrel (France)

Red Bull Salzburg won 7–0 on aggregate.

22 August 2013
18:00

Qarabağ (Azerbaijan)	0–2	(Germany) Eintracht Frankfurt
	Report	Meier 6', 75'

Tofiq Bahramov Stadium, Baku
Attendance: 30,500
Referee: Szymon Marciniak (Poland)
29 August 2013
20:30

Eintracht Frankfurt (Germany)	2–1	(Azerbaijan) Qarabağ
Meier 10'; Inui 75'	Report	Reynaldo 58'

Commerzbank-Arena, Frankfurt
Attendance: 47,000
Referee: Duarte Gomes (Portugal)

Eintracht Frankfurt won 4–1 on aggregate.

22 August 2013
18:30

Minsk (Belarus)	0–2	(Belgium) Standard Liège
	Report	Batshuayi 56'; Bulot 82'

Neman Stadium, Grodno
Attendance: 2,467
Referee: István Vad (Hungary)
29 August 2013
20:30

Standard Liège (Belgium)	3–1	(Belarus) Minsk
M'Poku 3'; De Camargo 6'; Mujangi Bia 35'	Report	Kibuk 8'

Stade Maurice Dufrasne, Liège
Attendance: 25,684
Referee: Simon Lee Evans (Wales)

Standard Liège won 5–1 on aggregate.

22 August 2013
18:00

Jablonec (Czech Republic)	1–2	(Spain) Real Betis
Kopic 43'	Report	Molina 21'; Cedric 86'

Chance Arena, Jablonec nad Nisou
Attendance: 5,850
Referee: Alexandru Tudor (Romania)
29 August 2013
21:30

Real Betis (Spain)	6–0	(Czech Republic) Jablonec
Castro 18'; Beneš 28' (o.g.); Matilla 50'; Molina 57'; Rodríguez 73'; Torres 81'	Report

Benito Villamarín, Seville
Attendance: 27,371
Referee: Aleksei Nikolaev (Russia)

Real Betis won 8–1 on aggregate.

22 August 2013
20:30

Rijeka (Croatia)	2–1	(Germany) VfB Stuttgart
Benko 74'; Kvržić 87'	Report	Ibišević 89'

Stadion Kantrida, Rijeka
Attendance: 10,000
Referee: Bas Nijhuis (Netherlands)
29 August 2013
18:00

VfB Stuttgart (Germany)	2–2	(Croatia) Rijeka
Gentner 34'; Marić 75' (o.g.)	Report	Benko 30'; Mujanović 90+4'

Mercedes-Benz Arena, Stuttgart
Attendance: 30,200
Referee: Martin Hansson (Sweden)

Rijeka won 4–3 on aggregate.

22 August 2013
20:30

Chornomorets Odesa (Ukraine)	1–0	(Albania) Skënderbeu
Gai 75'	Report

Chornomorets Stadium, Odesa
Attendance: 34,000
Referee: Anastassios Kakos (Greece)
29 August 2013
20:00

Skënderbeu (Albania)	1–0 (a.e.t.)	(Ukraine) Chornomorets Odesa
Ribaj 19'	Report
Penalties
Shkëmbi (penalty scored); Radas (penalty missed); Ribaj (penalty scored); Shehi (penalty scored); Gvozdenović (penalty scored); Bicaj (penalty scored); Lilaj (penalty scored); Orelesi (penalty missed); Nimaga (penalty missed)	6–7	(penalty scored) Didenko; (penalty scored) Fontanello; (penalty scored) Kutas; (penalty scored) Gai; (penalty missed) Léo Matos; (penalty scored) Samodin; (penalty scored) Anderson Mineiro; (penalty missed) Kovalchuk; (penalty scored) Pryyomov

Qemal Stafa Stadium, Tirana (Note: Skënderbeu played their home match at Qemal Stafa Stadium, Tirana, instead of their regular stadium Skënderbeu Stadium, Korçë, as it did not meet UEFA requirements.)
Attendance: 7,500
Referee: Antonio Mateu Lahoz (Spain)

1–1 on aggregate; Chornomorets Odesa won 7–6 on penalties.

22 August 2013
20:15

Maccabi Tel Aviv (Israel)	Cancelled (Note: On 14 August 2013, Metalist Kharkiv were disqualified from all 2013–14 UEFA club competitions because of previous match-fixing. UEFA decided to replace Metalist Kharkiv in the Champions League play-off round with PAOK, who were eliminated by Metalist Kharkiv in the third qualifying round of the Champions League. PAOK therefore vacated their place in the Europa League, and Maccabi Tel Aviv, the opponent drawn against PAOK in the Europa League play-off round, qualified directly for the Europa League group stage.)	(Greece) PAOK
	Report

Bloomfield Stadium, Tel Aviv
29 August 2013

PAOK (Greece)	Cancelled	(Israel) Maccabi Tel Aviv
	Report

Toumba Stadium, Thessaloniki

Maccabi Tel Aviv won on walkover as PAOK were promoted to the Champions League.

22 August 2013
19:00

St. Gallen (Switzerland)	1–1	(Russia) Spartak Moscow
Mathys 47'	Report	Movsisyan 37'

AFG Arena, St. Gallen
Attendance: 18,000
Referee: Ovidiu Hațegan (Romania)
29 August 2013
17:00

Spartak Moscow (Russia)	2–4	(Switzerland) St. Gallen
Özbiliz 1'; Movsisyan 83'	Report	Karanović 17', 32'; Rodríguez 36'; Janjatović 88'

Arena Khimki, Khimki
Attendance: 8,134
Referee: Danny Makkelie (Netherlands)

St. Gallen won 5–3 on aggregate.

22 August 2013
19:00

Molde (Norway)	0–2	(Russia) Rubin Kazan
	Report	Rondón 21', 90'

Aker Stadion, Molde
Attendance: 4,384
Referee: Alon Yefet (Israel)
29 August 2013
17:00

Rubin Kazan (Russia)	3–0	(Norway) Molde
Prudnikov 33'; Eremenko 50'; Azmoun 84'	Report

Central Stadium, Kazan
Attendance: 4,500
Referee: Sascha Kever (Switzerland)

Rubin Kazan won 5–0 on aggregate.

22 August 2013
20:30

Vojvodina (Serbia)	1–1	(Moldova) Sheriff Tiraspol
Škuletić 54'	Report	Isa 36'

Karađorđe Stadium, Novi Sad
Attendance: 11,000
Referee: Robert Schörgenhofer (Austria)
29 August 2013
19:00

Sheriff Tiraspol (Moldova)	2–1	(Serbia) Vojvodina
Jhulliam 59'; Fernando 67'	Report	Leković 90'

Sheriff Stadium, Tiraspol
Attendance: 6,839
Referee: Tony Chapron (France)

Sheriff Tiraspol won 3–2 on aggregate.

22 August 2013
19:30

Kukësi (Albania)	0–2	(Turkey) Trabzonspor
	Report	Mierzejewski 31' (pen.); Paulo Henrique 68'

Qemal Stafa Stadium, Tirana
Attendance: 10,000
Referee: Stanislav Todorov (Bulgaria)
29 August 2013
18:30

Trabzonspor (Turkey)	3–1	(Albania) Kukësi
Paulo Henrique 14', 64'; Malouda 54'	Report	Popović 11'

Hüseyin Avni Aker Stadium, Trabzon
Attendance: 23,500
Referee: Libor Kovařík (Czech Republic)

Trabzonspor won 5–1 on aggregate.

22 August 2013
19:00

Esbjerg (Denmark)	4–3	(France) Saint-Étienne
P. Ankersen 26', 80'; Van Buren 64'; Andreasen 75'	Report	Tabanou 22'; Hamouma 42'; Perrin 70'

Blue Water Arena, Esbjerg
Attendance: 11,478
Referee: Bobby Madden (Scotland)
29 August 2013
19:00

Saint-Étienne (France)	0–1	(Denmark) Esbjerg
	Report	Bayal Sall 73' (o.g.)

Stade Geoffroy-Guichard, Saint-Étienne
Attendance: 24,321
Referee: Vladislav Bezborodov (Russia)

Esbjerg won 5–3 on aggregate.

22 August 2013
21:00

Grasshopper (Switzerland)	1–2	(Italy) Fiorentina
Ngamukol 64'	Report	Cuadrado 13'; Grichting 46' (o.g.)

Letzigrund, Zürich
Attendance: 15,000
Referee: Matej Jug (Slovenia)
29 August 2013
21:00

Fiorentina (Italy)	0–1	(Switzerland) Grasshopper
	Report	Ben Khalifa 41'

Stadio Artemio Franchi, Florence
Attendance: 22,227
Referee: Ivan Bebek (Croatia)

2–2 on aggregate; Fiorentina won on away goals.

22 August 2013
18:30

Maccabi Haifa (Israel)	2–0	(Romania) Astra Giurgiu
Rayo 30'; Turgeman 61'	Report

Kiryat Eliezer Stadium, Haifa
Attendance: 11,900
Referee: Kevin Blom (Netherlands)
29 August 2013
18:00

Astra Giurgiu (Romania)	1–1	(Israel) Maccabi Haifa
Găman 27'	Report	Rayo 34'

Stadionul Ceahlăul, Piatra Neamț
Attendance: 1,512
Referee: Hüseyin Göçek (Turkey)

Maccabi Haifa won 3–1 on aggregate.

22 August 2013
20:45

Udinese (Italy)	1–3	(Czech Republic) Slovan Liberec
Gabriel Silva 35'	Report	Rybalka 16'; Delarge 49'; Kušnír 83'

Stadio Nereo Rocco, Trieste
Attendance: 10,000
Referee: Tom Harald Hagen (Norway)
29 August 2013
19:00

Slovan Liberec (Czech Republic)	1–1	(Italy) Udinese
Delarge 23'	Report	Lazzari 42'

Stadion u Nisy, Liberec
Attendance: 9,700
Referee: Anastasios Sidiropoulos (Greece)

Slovan Liberec won 4–2 on aggregate.

22 August 2013
18:00

Dinamo Tbilisi (Georgia (country))	0–5	(England) Tottenham Hotspur
	Report	Townsend 12'; Paulinho 44'; Soldado 58', 68'; Rose 65'

Dinamo Arena, Tbilisi
Attendance: 22,500
Referee: Pol van Boekel (Netherlands)
29 August 2013
21:05

Tottenham Hotspur (England)	3–0	(Georgia (country)) Dinamo Tbilisi
Defoe 40', 45+2'; Holtby 69'	Report

White Hart Lane, London
Attendance: 26,189
Referee: Luca Banti (Italy)

Tottenham Hotspur won 8–0 on aggregate.

22 August 2013
21:30

Estoril (Portugal)	2–0	(Austria) Pasching
Evandro 10'; Carlitos 40'	Report

Estádio António Coimbra da Mota, Estoril
Attendance: 2,178
Referee: Bülent Yıldırım (Turkey)
29 August 2013
20:30

Pasching (Austria)	1–2	(Portugal) Estoril
Sobkova 57'	Report	Leal 21', 52'

Linzer Stadion, Linz
Attendance: 1,350
Referee: Craig Thomson (Scotland)

Estoril won 4–1 on aggregate.

22 August 2013
19:00

Nõmme Kalju (Estonia)	1–3	(Ukraine) Dnipro Dnipropetrovsk
Toomet 54'	Report	Seleznyov 23' (pen.); Giuliano 36'; Zozulya 53'

A. Le Coq Arena, Tallinn (Note: Nõmme Kalju played their home match at A. Le Coq Arena, Tallinn, instead of their regular stadium Kadriorg Stadium, Tallinn, as it did not meet UEFA requirements.)
Attendance: 2,462
Referee: Kristinn Jakobsson (Iceland)
29 August 2013
20:30

Dnipro Dnipropetrovsk (Ukraine)	2–0	(Estonia) Nõmme Kalju
Kobakhidze 39'; Zozulya 70'	Report

Dnipro-Arena, Dnipropetrovsk
Attendance: 12,831
Referee: Gediminas Mažeika (Lithuania)

Dnipro Dnipropetrovsk won 5–1 on aggregate.

22 August 2013
20:30

Partizan (Serbia)	1–0	(Switzerland) Thun
Jojić 70'	Report

Partizan Stadium, Belgrade
Attendance: 15,000
Referee: Serhiy Boyko (Ukraine)
29 August 2013
20:00

Thun (Switzerland)	3–0	(Serbia) Partizan
C. Schneuwly 15'; M. Schneuwly 48'; Zuffi 75'	Report

Arena Thun, Thun
Attendance: 8,150
Referee: Daniele Orsato (Italy)

Thun won 3–1 on aggregate.
