= Marco Mathys =

Swiss footballer (born 1987)

Personal information
- Full name: Marco Mathys
- Date of birth: 5 July 1987 (age 39)
- Place of birth: Derendingen, Switzerland
- Height: 1.84 m (6 ft 1/2 in)
- Position: Midfielder

Team information
- Current team: FC Solothurn
- Number: 20

Youth career
- –2006: SC Derendingen

Senior career*
Years	Team	Apps	(Gls)
2006–2009	Concordia Basel	79	(8)
2009–2012	Biel/Bienne	73	(23)
2012–2016	St. Gallen	132	(16)
2016–2018	Vaduz	72	(13)
2019–	FC Solothurn	6	(0)
- * Club domestic league appearances and goals

Marco Mathys (born 5 July 1987) is a Swiss footballer who plays for FC Solothurn in the Swiss 1. Liga.

== Career ==
=== Early career ===
Mathys came up through the youth ranks of hometown club SC Derendingen.

=== Concordia Basel ===
In July 2006, Mathys moved to FC Concordia Basel. In three seasons with the club, he made 79 league appearances, scoring eight times.

=== Biel/Benne ===
In July 2009, Mathys moved to Swiss Challenge League club FC Biel-Bienne on a free transfer. He made his league debut for the club on 26 July 2009 in a 2–0 loss to FC Vaduz. He was replaced by David Casasnovas in the 83rd minute. He scored his first league goal for the club a week later in a 3–0 home victory over Stade Nyonnais. His goal came in the 49th minute.

=== St. Gallen ===
In January 2012, Mathys was sold to FC St. Gallen for £63,000. His league debut for St. Gallen came on 18 February 2012 in a 6-0 demolition of SR Delémont. He was brought on for Manuel Sutter in the 57th minute. His first league goal came on 31 March 2012 in a 3–2 victory over FC Wil. His goal came just six minutes after being introduced, and made the score 2–1 in favor of St. Gallen. He had been brought on for Manuel Sutter in the 56th minute. In his first season with the club, they won the Swiss Challenge League and were promoted to the Swiss Super League.

=== Vaduz ===
In July 2016, Mathys was sold to FC Vaduz on a free transfer. He made his league debut for the club on 24 July 2016 in a 1–1 draw with FC Thun. He was subbed off in the 84th minute, replaced by eventual goal-scorer Ali Messaoud. His first league goal came as part of a hat-trick scored in a 5–1 victory over FC Lugano. The goals came in the 62nd, 75th, and 92nd minutes. Unfortunately, the club was relegated in his first season with them.

He left Vaduz at the end of 2018.

=== FC Solothurn ===
Mathys joined FC Solothurn on 12 June 2019.

== Honours ==
St. Gallen

- Swiss Challenge League (1): 2011–12

FC Vaduz

- Liechtenstein Football Cup (2): 2016–17, 2017–18
