= 2013–14 UEFA Europa League qualifying (first and second round matches) =

European football competition

This page summarises the matches of the first and second qualifying rounds of 2013–14 UEFA Europa League qualifying.

Times are CEST (UTC+2), as listed by UEFA (local times, if different, are in parentheses).

== First qualifying round ==
=== Summary ===
The first legs were played on 2, 3 and 4 July, and the second legs were played on 9, 10 and 11 July 2013.

Inter Turku lodged a protest after losing the second leg to Víkingur Gøta, and two match officials were later banned for life by UEFA for attempted match-fixing.

Team 1	Agg.	Team 2	1st leg	2nd leg
Víkingur Gøta (Faroe Islands)	2–1	(Finland) Inter Turku	1–1	1–0
Žalgiris (Lithuania)	4–3	(Republic of Ireland) St Patrick's Athletic	2–2	2–1
Airbus UK Broughton (Wales)	1–1 (a)	(Latvia) Ventspils	1–1	0–0
Narva Trans (Estonia)	1–8	(Sweden) Gefle IF	0–3	1–5
KR (Iceland)	3–0	(Northern Ireland) Glentoran	0–0	3–0
Chikhura Sachkhere (Georgia (country))	1–1 (a)	(Liechtenstein) Vaduz	0–0	1–1
Milsami Orhei (Moldova)	1–0	(Luxembourg) F91 Dudelange	1–0	0–0
Metalurg Skopje (North Macedonia)	0–2	(Azerbaijan) Qarabağ	0–1	0–1
Videoton (Hungary)	2–2 (a) (Note: Order of legs reversed after original draw.)	(Montenegro) Mladost Podgorica	2–1	0–1
Flora (Estonia)	1–1 (a)	(Albania) Kukësi	1–1	0–0
Teteks (North Macedonia)	1–2	(Armenia) Pyunik	1–1	0–1
Teuta (Albania)	3–3 (a)	(Moldova) Dacia Chișinău	3–1	0–2
Sarajevo (Bosnia and Herzegovina)	3–1	(San Marino) Libertas	1–0	2–1
Sliema Wanderers (Malta)	1–2	(Azerbaijan) Khazar Lankaran	1–1	0–1
Levski Sofia (Bulgaria)	0–2	(Kazakhstan) Irtysh	0–0	0–2
Hibernians (Malta)	3–7	(Serbia) Vojvodina	1–4	2–3
Astana (Kazakhstan)	0–6	(Bulgaria) Botev Plovdiv	0–1	0–5
UE Santa Coloma (Andorra)	1–4	(Bosnia and Herzegovina) Zrinjski Mostar	1–3	0–1
Domžale (Slovenia)	0–3	(Romania) Astra Giurgiu	0–1	0–2
Rudar Pljevlja (Montenegro)	2–1	(Armenia) Mika	1–0	1–1
Breiðablik (Iceland)	4–0	(Andorra) FC Santa Coloma	4–0	0–0
Drogheda United (Republic of Ireland)	0–2	(Sweden) Malmö FF	0–0	0–2
Inter Baku (Azerbaijan)	3–1	(Finland) Mariehamn	1–1	2–0
ÍF (Faroe Islands)	0–5	(Northern Ireland) Linfield	0–2	0–3
Prestatyn Town (Wales)	3–3 (4–3 p)	(Latvia) Liepājas Metalurgs	1–2	2–1 (a.e.t.)
Tromsø (Norway)	3–2	(Slovenia) Celje	1–2	2–0
Tiraspol (Moldova)	1–1 (2–4 p)	(Latvia) Skonto	0–1	1–0 (a.e.t.)
Crusaders (Northern Ireland)	3–9	(Norway) Rosenborg	1–2	2–7
ÍBV (Iceland)	2–1	(Faroe Islands) HB	1–1	1–0
Jeunesse Esch (Luxembourg)	3–2	(Finland) TPS	2–0	1–2
Bala Town (Wales)	2–3	(Estonia) Levadia Tallinn	1–0	1–3
Kruoja Pakruojis (Lithuania)	0–8	(Belarus) Dinamo Minsk	0–3	0–5
La Fiorita (San Marino)	0–4	(Malta) Valletta	0–3	0–1
Laçi (Albania)	1–3	(Luxembourg) Differdange 03	0–1	1–2
Gandzasar Kapan (Armenia)	2–4	(Kazakhstan) Aktobe	1–2	1–2
Čelik Nikšić (Montenegro)	1–13	(Hungary) Honvéd	1–4	0–9
Torpedo Kutaisi (Georgia (country))	3–6	(Slovakia) Žilina	0–3	3–3
Sūduva (Lithuania)	4–4 (4–5 p)	(North Macedonia) Turnovo	2–2	2–2 (a.e.t.)

=== Matches ===
4 July 2013
20:00

Víkingur Gøta (Faroe Islands)	1–1	(Finland) Inter Turku
Justinussen 75'	Report	Nikkari 20'

Svangaskarð, Toftir
Attendance: 280
Referee: Mark Courtney (Northern Ireland)
11 July 2013
18:00

Inter Turku (Finland)	0–1	(Faroe Islands) Víkingur Gøta
	Report	H. Jacobsen 78' (pen.)

Veritas Stadion, Turku
Attendance: 1,781
Referee: Andranik Arsenyan (Armenia)

Víkingur Gøta won 2–1 on aggregate.

4 July 2013
20:10

Žalgiris (Lithuania)	2–2	(Republic of Ireland) St Patrick's Athletic
Komolov 23'; Biliński 70'	Report	Byrne 55'; O'Brien 87'

LFF Stadium, Vilnius
Attendance: 4,200
Referee: Mitja Žganec (Slovenia)
11 July 2013
20:45

St Patrick's Athletic (Republic of Ireland)	1–2	(Lithuania) Žalgiris
Brennan 85' (pen.)	Report	Kuklys 45+1'; Biliński 52'

Richmond Park, Dublin
Attendance: 2,700
Referee: Igor Pristovnik (Croatia)

Žalgiris won 4–3 on aggregate.

4 July 2013
20:30

Airbus UK Broughton (Wales)	1–1	(Latvia) Ventspils
Budrys 80'	Report	Paulius 48'

Racecourse Ground, Wrexham
Attendance: 1,451
Referee: Nikola Popov (Bulgaria)
11 July 2013
17:00

Ventspils (Latvia)	0–0	(Wales) Airbus UK Broughton
	Report

Ventspils Olimpiskais Stadions, Ventspils
Attendance: 1,100
Referee: Ignasi Villamayor Rozados (Andorra)

1–1 on aggregate; Ventspils won on away goals.

2 July 2013
18:00

Narva Trans (Estonia)	0–3	(Sweden) Gefle IF
	Report	Dubõkin 43' (o.g.); Dahlberg 57'; Lantto 90+3'

A. Le Coq Arena, Tallinn
Attendance: 263
Referee: Boško Jovanetić (Serbia)
11 July 2013
17:00

Gefle IF (Sweden)	5–1	(Estonia) Narva Trans
Hansson 17'; Oremo 47', 90+1'; Dahlberg 50'; Törnros 71'	Report	Lvov 82'

Norrporten Arena, Sundsvall
Attendance: 444
Referee: Michael Oliver (England)

Gefle IF won 8–1 on aggregate.

4 July 2013
21:15

KR (Iceland)	0–0	(Northern Ireland) Glentoran
	Report

KR-völlur, Reykjavík
Attendance: 967
Referee: Gerhard Grobelnik (Austria)
11 July 2013
20:30

Glentoran (Northern Ireland)	0–3	(Iceland) KR
	Report	Martin 23'; Sævarsson 65', 90+2'

The Oval, Belfast
Attendance: 1,700
Referee: Georgi Kabakov (Bulgaria)

KR won 3–0 on aggregate.

4 July 2013
16:00

Chikhura Sachkhere (Georgia (country))	0–0	(Liechtenstein) Vaduz
	Report

Mikheil Meskhi Stadium, Tbilisi
Attendance: 1,200
Referee: Alexandr Gauzer (Kazakhstan)
11 July 2013
19:00

Vaduz (Liechtenstein)	1–1	(Georgia (country)) Chikhura Sachkhere
Sutter 29'	Report	Jigauri 2'

Rheinpark Stadion, Vaduz
Attendance: 1,124
Referee: Enea Jorgji (Albania)

1–1 on aggregate; Chikhura Sachkhere won on away goals.

4 July 2013
17:00

Milsami Orhei (Moldova)	1–0	(Luxembourg) F91 Dudelange
Andronic 35'	Report

CSR Orhei, Orhei
Attendance: 2,500
Referee: Tore Hansen (Norway)
11 July 2013
18:00

F91 Dudelange (Luxembourg)	0–0	(Moldova) Milsami Orhei
	Report

Stade Jos Nosbaum, Dudelange
Attendance: 952
Referee: Vadims Direktorenko (Latvia)

Milsami Orhei won 1–0 on aggregate.

2 July 2013
17:45

Metalurg Skopje (North Macedonia)	0–1	(Azerbaijan) Qarabağ
	Report	Reynaldo 64'

Philip II Arena, Skopje
Attendance: 425
Referee: Lars Christoffersen (Denmark)
11 July 2013
18:00

Qarabağ (Azerbaijan)	1–0	(North Macedonia) Metalurg Skopje
George 85'	Report

Tofiq Bahramov Stadium, Baku
Attendance: 5,000
Referee: Radek Matějek (Czech Republic)

Qarabağ won 2–0 on aggregate.

4 July 2013
20:30

Videoton (Hungary)	2–1	(Montenegro) Mladost Podgorica
Vinícius 35'; Gyurcsó 41'	Report	Marković 3' (pen.)

Sóstói Stadion, Székesfehérvár
Attendance: 6,520
Referee: Andreas Ekberg (Sweden)
11 July 2013
17:30

Mladost Podgorica (Montenegro)	1–0	(Hungary) Videoton
Knežević 90+2' (pen.)	Report

Podgorica City Stadium, Podgorica
Attendance: 2,700
Referee: Jérôme Efong Nzolo (Belgium)

2–2 on aggregate; Mladost Podgorica won on away goals.

4 July 2013
18:30

Flora (Estonia)	1–1	(Albania) Kukësi
Post 11'	Report	Progni 79'

A. Le Coq Arena, Tallinn
Attendance: 2,400
Referee: Denis Scherbakov (Belarus)
11 July 2013
19:30

Kukësi (Albania)	0–0	(Estonia) Flora
	Report

Qemal Stafa Stadium, Tirana (Note: Kukësi played their home matches at Qemal Stafa Stadium, Tirana, instead of their regular stadium Zeqir Ymeri Stadium, Kukës, as it did not meet UEFA requirements.)
Attendance: 4,000
Referee: Mark Steven Whitby (Wales)

1–1 on aggregate; Kukësi won on away goals.

4 July 2013
17:45

Teteks (North Macedonia)	1–1	(Armenia) Pyunik
Iseni 90'	Report	Ayvazyan 81'

Philip II Arena, Skopje
Attendance: 1,200
Referee: Sascha Amhof (Switzerland)
11 July 2013
17:00

Pyunik (Armenia)	1–0	(North Macedonia) Teteks
Ayvazyan 90+3'	Report

Republican Stadium, Yerevan
Attendance: 2,900
Referee: Peter Královič (Slovakia)

Pyunik won 2–1 on aggregate.

4 July 2013
20:00

Teuta (Albania)	3–1	(Moldova) Dacia Chișinău
Xhafa 29'; Dosti 68'; Mançaku 73'	Report	Pavlov 38'

Niko Dovana Stadium, Durrës
Attendance: 1,000
Referee: Barış Şimşek (Turkey)
11 July 2013
19:15

Dacia Chișinău (Moldova)	2–0	(Albania) Teuta
Stoleru 20'; Pavlov 75'	Report

Zimbru Stadium, Chișinău
Attendance: 2,561
Referee: Nikolaj Hänni (Switzerland)

3–3 on aggregate; Dacia Chișinău won on away goals.

4 July 2013
20:30

Sarajevo (Bosnia and Herzegovina)	1–0	(San Marino) Libertas
Melunović 19'	Report

Asim Ferhatović Hase Stadium, Sarajevo
Attendance: 6,500
Referee: Christos Nicolaides (Cyprus)
11 July 2013
21:00

Libertas (San Marino)	1–2	(Bosnia and Herzegovina) Sarajevo
Morelli 28'	Report	Haurdić 2'; Todorović 45+1'

Stadio Olimpico, Serravalle
Attendance: 665
Referee: Rahim Hasanov (Azerbaijan)

Sarajevo won 3–1 on aggregate.

2 July 2013
17:45

Sliema Wanderers (Malta)	1–1	(Azerbaijan) Khazar Lankaran
Ohawuchi 62'	Report	Nildo 13'

Centenary Stadium, Ta' Qali
Attendance: 394
Referee: Eiko Saar (Estonia)
11 July 2013
17:00

Khazar Lankaran (Azerbaijan)	1–0	(Malta) Sliema Wanderers
Amirguliyev 29'	Report

Lankaran City Stadium, Lankaran
Attendance: 11,055
Referee: Wim Smet (Belgium)

Khazar Lankaran won 2–1 on aggregate.

4 July 2013
20:00

Levski Sofia (Bulgaria)	0–0	(Kazakhstan) Irtysh
	Report

Georgi Asparuhov Stadium, Sofia
Attendance: 5,945
Referee: Orel Grinfeeld (Israel)
11 July 2013
15:00

Irtysh (Kazakhstan)	2–0	(Bulgaria) Levski Sofia
Murzoev 6'; Bakayev 13' (pen.)	Report

Pavlodar Central Stadium, Pavlodar
Attendance: 9,500
Referee: Alexander Harkam (Austria)

Irtysh won 2–0 on aggregate.

4 July 2013
18:00

Hibernians (Malta)	1–4	(Serbia) Vojvodina
Obiefule 78'	Report	Škuletić 40'; Soares 43' (o.g.); Oumarou 50'; Kosović 82'

Centenary Stadium, Ta' Qali
Attendance: 638
Referee: Suren Baliyan (Armenia)
11 July 2013
20:30

Vojvodina (Serbia)	3–2	(Malta) Hibernians
Alivodić 40'; Škuletić 62', 67'	Report	Škuletić 42' (o.g.); Failla 47' (pen.)

Karađorđe Stadium, Novi Sad
Attendance: 4,582
Referee: Tornike Gvantseladze (Georgia)

Vojvodina won 7–3 on aggregate.

4 July 2013
16:00

Astana (Kazakhstan)	0–1	(Bulgaria) Botev Plovdiv
	Report	Jirsák 44'

Astana Arena, Astana
Attendance: 5,670
Referee: George Vadachkoria (Georgia)
11 July 2013
19:30

Botev Plovdiv (Bulgaria)	5–0	(Kazakhstan) Astana
Ognyanov 54'; Vander 56' (pen.); Nedelev 58', 75'; Grnčarov 71'	Report

Lazur Stadium, Burgas
Attendance: 7,400
Referee: Pavle Radovanović (Montenegro)

Botev Plovdiv won 6–0 on aggregate.

4 July 2013
17:30

UE Santa Coloma (Andorra)	1–3	(Bosnia and Herzegovina) Zrinjski Mostar
Bernat 45+1'	Report	Crnov 63'; Popović 66'; Đurić 77'

Estadi Comunal d'Andorra la Vella, Andorra la Vella
Attendance: 215
Referee: Petur Reinert (Faroe Islands)
11 July 2013
18:30

Zrinjski Mostar (Bosnia and Herzegovina)	1–0	(Andorra) UE Santa Coloma
Đurić 76'	Report

Bijeli Brijeg Stadium, Mostar
Attendance: 2,000
Referee: Kevin Azzopardi (Malta)

Zrinjski Mostar won 4–1 on aggregate.

4 July 2013
20:45

Domžale (Slovenia)	0–1	(Romania) Astra Giurgiu
	Report	Budescu 84'

Domžale Sports Park, Domžale
Attendance: 1,000
Referee: Andreas Pappas (Greece)
11 July 2013
20:00

Astra Giurgiu (Romania)	2–0	(Slovenia) Domžale
Vidmar 50' (o.g.); Bukari 62'	Report

Arena Națională, Bucharest
Attendance: 1,513
Referee: Yaroslav Kozyk (Ukraine)

Astra Giurgiu won 3–0 on aggregate.

4 July 2013
20:30

Rudar Pljevlja (Montenegro)	1–0	(Armenia) Mika
Damjanović 16'	Report

Podgorica City Stadium, Podgorica
Attendance: 600
Referee: Michael Johansen (Denmark)
9 July 2013
15:30

Mika (Armenia)	1–1	(Montenegro) Rudar Pljevlja
Ghazaryan 45+1'	Report	Stojanović 85'

Mika Stadium, Yerevan
Attendance: 2,760
Referee: Svein-Erik Edvartsen (Norway)

Rudar Pljevlja won 2–1 on aggregate.

4 July 2013
21:15

Breiðablik (Iceland)	4–0	(Andorra) FC Santa Coloma
Hreiðarsson 19'; Hreinsson 23', 25'; Lýðsson 61' (pen.)	Report

Kópavogsvöllur, Kópavogur
Attendance: 848
Referee: Chris Reisch (Luxembourg)
11 July 2013
17:30

FC Santa Coloma (Andorra)	0–0	(Iceland) Breiðablik
	Report

Estadi Comunal d'Andorra la Vella, Andorra la Vella
Attendance: 190
Referee: Dennis Antamo (Finland)

Breiðablik won 4–0 on aggregate.

4 July 2013
20:45

Drogheda United (Republic of Ireland)	0–0	(Sweden) Malmö FF
	Report

Tallaght Stadium, Tallaght
Attendance: 1,496
Referee: Emir Alečković (Bosnia and Herzegovina)
11 July 2013
19:00

Malmö FF (Sweden)	2–0	(Republic of Ireland) Drogheda United
Forsberg 45'; Kroon 90+4'	Report

Swedbank Stadion, Malmö
Attendance: 5,689
Referee: Anatoliy Abdula (Ukraine)

Malmö FF won 2–0 on aggregate.

4 July 2013
18:00

Inter Baku (Azerbaijan)	1–1	(Finland) Mariehamn
Mammadov 7'	Report	Adlam 72'

Bayil Stadium, Baku
Attendance: 2,300
Referee: Sergejus Slyva (Lithuania)
11 July 2013
19:00

Mariehamn (Finland)	0–2	(Azerbaijan) Inter Baku
	Report	Tskhadadze 21' (pen.); Javadov 86'

Wiklöf Holding Arena, Mariehamn
Attendance: 1,532
Referee: Mervyn Smyth (Northern Ireland)

Inter Baku won 3–1 on aggregate.

3 July 2013
20:45

ÍF (Faroe Islands)	0–2	(Northern Ireland) Linfield
	Report	Waterworth 68'; Lowry 74'

Tórsvøllur, Tórshavn
Attendance: 411
Referee: Aleksandrs Anufrijevs (Latvia)
10 July 2013
20:45

Linfield (Northern Ireland)	3–0	(Faroe Islands) ÍF
Gault 40'; Mulgrew 55'; Lowry 61'	Report

Windsor Park, Belfast
Attendance: 1,600
Referee: Dejan Jakimovski (Macedonia)

Linfield won 5–0 on aggregate.

4 July 2013
20:00

Prestatyn Town (Wales)	1–2	(Latvia) Liepājas Metalurgs
Parkinson 45'	Report	Kalns 16'; Šadčins 62'

Belle Vue, Rhyl
Attendance: 1,017
Referee: Sven Bindels (Luxembourg)
11 July 2013
18:00

Liepājas Metalurgs (Latvia)	1–2 (a.e.t.)	(Wales) Prestatyn Town
Afanasjevs 17'	Report	Stephens 77'; Gibson 90+1'
Penalties
Kalns (penalty missed); Šadčins (penalty scored); Jemeļins (penalty scored); Varažinskis (penalty scored); D. Ikaunieks (penalty missed)	3–4	(penalty scored) Gibson; (penalty scored) Stephens; (penalty scored) Hessey; (penalty scored) Parkinson

Daugava Stadium, Liepāja
Attendance: 2,500
Referee: Sergey Tsinkevich (Belarus)

3–3 on aggregate; Prestatyn Town won 4–3 on penalties.

4 July 2013
19:00

Tromsø (Norway)	1–2	(Slovenia) Celje
Koppinen 30'	Report	Žurej 75'; Gobec 84' (pen.)

Alfheim Stadion, Tromsø
Attendance: 1,582
Referee: Felix Zwayer (Germany)
11 July 2013
19:00

Celje (Slovenia)	0–2	(Norway) Tromsø
	Report	Andersen 4'; Moldskred 16'

Arena Petrol, Celje
Attendance: 2,800
Referee: Sebastian Colţescu (Romania)

Tromsø won 3–2 on aggregate.

4 July 2013
19:00

Tiraspol (Moldova)	0–1	(Latvia) Skonto
	Report	Mingazow 51'

Malaya Sportivnaya Arena, Tiraspol
Attendance: 3,575
Referee: Vladimir Vnuk (Slovakia)
11 July 2013
18:00

Skonto (Latvia)	0–1 (a.e.t.)	(Moldova) Tiraspol
	Report	Zarichnyuk 80'
Penalties
Šabala (penalty scored); Laizāns (penalty scored); Fertovs (penalty scored); Osipovs (penalty scored)	4–2	(penalty scored) Josan; (penalty missed) Gheorghiev; (penalty missed) Grosu; (penalty scored) Shapoval

Skonto Stadium, Riga
Attendance: 3,000
Referee: Michael Tykgaard (Denmark)

1–1 on aggregate; Skonto won 4–2 on penalties.

4 July 2013
20:45

Crusaders (Northern Ireland)	1–2	(Norway) Rosenborg
Owens 22'	Report	Chibuike 45+1'; Svensson 77'

Seaview, Belfast
Attendance: 948
Referee: Hugo Miguel (Portugal)
11 July 2013
19:00

Rosenborg (Norway)	7–2	(Northern Ireland) Crusaders
Høiland 15'; Chibuike 34', 50'; Dočkal 57'; Mikkelsen 60'; Sørloth 72'; Svensson 90'	Report	Leeman 49'; Owens 68'

Lerkendal Stadion, Trondheim
Attendance: 4,003
Referee: Aleksei Kulbakov (Belarus)

Rosenborg won 9–3 on aggregate.

4 July 2013
21:30

ÍBV (Iceland)	1–1	(Faroe Islands) HB
Guðmundsson 16'	Report	Jóh. Davidsen 66'

Hásteinsvöllur, Vestmannaeyjar
Attendance: 950
Referee: Ádám Németh (Hungary)
11 July 2013
20:00

HB (Faroe Islands)	0–1	(Iceland) ÍBV
	Report	Bergsson 90' (pen.)

Tórsvøllur, Tórshavn
Attendance: 1,608
Referee: Robert Rogers (Republic of Ireland)

ÍBV won 2–1 on aggregate.

4 July 2013
18:00

Jeunesse Esch (Luxembourg)	2–0	(Finland) TPS
Benichou 21'; Wang Chu 52'	Report

Stade de la Frontière, Esch-sur-Alzette
Attendance: 1,157
Referee: Nerijus Dunauskas (Lithuania)
9 July 2013
18:00

TPS (Finland)	2–1	(Luxembourg) Jeunesse Esch
Vitali 38' (o.g.); Riski 87'	Report	Wang Chu 80'

Veritas Stadion, Turku
Attendance: 2,189
Referee: Gunnar Jarl Jónsson (Iceland)

Jeunesse Esch won 3–2 on aggregate.

2 July 2013
20:00

Bala Town (Wales)	1–0	(Estonia) Levadia Tallinn
Sheridan 4'	Report

Belle Vue, Rhyl
Attendance: 1,247
Referee: Vasilis Dimitriou (Cyprus)
11 July 2013
18:00

Levadia Tallinn (Estonia)	3–1	(Wales) Bala Town
Hunt 6', 21', 50'	Report	R. Jones 89'

Kadriorg Stadium, Tallinn
Attendance: 2,567
Referee: Dumitru Muntean (Moldova)

Levadia Tallinn won 3–2 on aggregate.

4 July 2013
18:00

Kruoja Pakruojis (Lithuania)	0–3	(Belarus) Dinamo Minsk
	Report	Figueredo 63'; Palitsevich 72'; Rassadkin 84'

Savivaldybė Stadium, Šiauliai
Attendance: 760
Referee: Thorvaldur Árnason (Iceland)
11 July 2013
18:00

Dinamo Minsk (Belarus)	5–0	(Lithuania) Kruoja Pakruojis
Bykov 5'; Figueredo 14'; Sychev 16', 17'; Khvashchynski 70'	Report

Traktor Stadium, Minsk
Attendance: 2,900
Referee: Aliyar Ağayev (Azerbaijan)

Dinamo Minsk won 8–0 on aggregate.

4 July 2013
21:00

La Fiorita (San Marino)	0–3	(Malta) Valletta
	Report	Denni 30' (pen.), 50'; Zammit 90+3'

Stadio Olimpico, Serravalle
Attendance: 374
Referee: Lorenc Jemini (Albania)
11 July 2013
18:00

Valletta (Malta)	1–0	(San Marino) La Fiorita
Zammit 90' (pen.)	Report

Centenary Stadium, Ta' Qali
Attendance: 998
Referee: Bryn Markham-Jones (Wales)

Valletta won 4–0 on aggregate.

4 July 2013
19:00

Laçi (Albania)	0–1	(Luxembourg) Differdange 03
	Report	Lebresne 84'

Skënderbeu Stadium, Korçë
Attendance: 300
Referee: Leonardo Guidi (San Marino)
9 July 2013
19:30

Differdange 03 (Luxembourg)	2–1	(Albania) Laçi
Er Rafik 55', 75'	Report	Nimani 38'

Stade Municipal de la Ville de Differdange, Differdange
Attendance: 952
Referee: Robert Malek (Poland)

Differdange 03 won 3–1 on aggregate.

4 July 2013
17:00

Gandzasar Kapan (Armenia)	1–2	(Kazakhstan) Aktobe
Dashyan 90'	Report	Davydov 61'; Tagybergen 78'

Republican Stadium, Yerevan
Attendance: 2,100
Referee: Daniel Stefański (Poland)
11 July 2013
18:00

Aktobe (Kazakhstan)	2–1	(Armenia) Gandzasar Kapan
Kapadze 2', 54'	Report	N. Beglaryan 35'

Aktobe Central Stadium, Aktobe
Attendance: 12,800
Referee: Nikola Dabanović (Montenegro)

Aktobe won 4–2 on aggregate.

4 July 2013
17:30

Čelik Nikšić (Montenegro)	1–4	(Hungary) Honvéd
Radović 16'	Report	Délczeg 38'; Holender 41', 62'; Diaby 52'

Gradski stadion, Nikšić
Attendance: 1,300
Referee: Martin Strömbergsson (Sweden)
11 July 2013
20:30

Honvéd (Hungary)	9–0	(Montenegro) Čelik Nikšić
Holender 14'; Diaby 23'; Diarra 36'; Délczeg 49' (pen.); Testardi 66' (pen.), 75', 87'; Alcibiade 67'; Kozma 81'	Report

Bozsik József Stadion, Budapest
Attendance: 1,800
Referee: Jonathan Lardot (Belgium)

Honvéd won 13–1 on aggregate.

4 July 2013
19:00

Torpedo Kutaisi (Georgia (country))	0–3	(Slovakia) Žilina
	Report	Majtán 58', 84'; Pich 77'

Givi Kiladze Stadium, Kutaisi
Attendance: 4,150
Referee: Domagoj Vučkov (Croatia)
11 July 2013
17:30

Žilina (Slovakia)	3–3	(Georgia (country)) Torpedo Kutaisi
Majtán 17'; Pich 23', 62'	Report	Kapanadze 29', 61'; Mzevashvili 79'

Štadión pod Dubňom, Žilina
Attendance: 3,197
Referee: Elmir Pilav (Bosnia and Herzegovina)

Žilina won 6–3 on aggregate.

4 July 2013
18:45

Sūduva (Lithuania)	2–2	(North Macedonia) Turnovo
Basič 23'; Valskis 85'	Report	Baldovaliev 30'; Blaževski 45+1' (pen.)

ARVI Football Arena, Marijampolė
Attendance: 1,500
Referee: Jari Järvinen (Finland)
11 July 2013
17:30

Turnovo (North Macedonia)	2–2 (a.e.t.)	(Lithuania) Sūduva
Mitrov 47'; Blaževski 90+7' (pen.)	Report	Valskis 43'; Radzinevičius 52'
Penalties
Baldovaliev (penalty scored); Blaževski (penalty scored); Najdenov (penalty scored); Tasev (penalty missed); Mavrov (penalty scored); Stoilov (penalty scored)	5–4	(penalty scored) Bašić; (penalty missed) Urba; (penalty scored) Šoblinskas; (penalty scored) Brokas; (penalty scored) Uggè; (penalty missed) Leimonas

Philip II Arena, Skopje
Attendance: 1,558
Referee: Clayton Pisani (Malta)

4–4 on aggregate; Turnovo won 5–4 on penalties.

== Second qualifying round ==
=== Summary ===
The first legs were played on 16 and 18 July, and the second legs were played on 25 July 2013.

Team 1	Agg.	Team 2	1st leg	2nd leg
Sparta Prague (Czech Republic)	2–3 (Note: Order of legs reversed after original draw.)	(Sweden) BK Häcken	2–2	0–1
Kukësi (Albania)	3–2	(Bosnia and Herzegovina) Sarajevo	3–2	0–0
Thun (Switzerland)	5–1	(Georgia (country)) Chikhura Sachkhere	2–0	3–1
Skoda Xanthi (Greece)	2–2 (a)	(Northern Ireland) Linfield	0–1	2–1 (a.e.t.)
Hødd (Norway)	1–2	(Kazakhstan) Aktobe	1–0	0–2
Dila Gori (Georgia (country))	3–0	(Denmark) AaB	3–0	0–0
Maccabi Haifa (Israel)	10–0	(Azerbaijan) Khazar Lankaran	2–0	8–0
Hajduk Split (Croatia)	3–2	(North Macedonia) Turnovo	2–1	1–1
Ventspils (Latvia)	5–1	(Luxembourg) Jeunesse Esch	1–0	4–1
Astra Giurgiu (Romania)	3–2	(Cyprus) Omonia	1–1	2–1
Skonto (Latvia)	2–2 (a)	(Czech Republic) Slovan Liberec	2–1	0–1
Levadia Tallinn (Estonia)	0–4	(Romania) Pandurii Târgu Jiu	0–0	0–4
Śląsk Wrocław (Poland)	6–2	(Montenegro) Rudar Pljevlja	4–0	2–2
Malmö FF (Sweden)	9–0	(Scotland) Hibernian	2–0	7–0
Jagodina (Serbia)	2–4	(Russia) Rubin Kazan	2–3	0–1
Strømsgodset (Norway)	5–2	(Hungary) Debrecen	2–2	3–0
Petrolul Ploiești (Romania)	7–0	(Faroe Islands) Víkingur Gøta	3–0	4–0
Rijeka (Croatia)	8–0	(Wales) Prestatyn Town	5–0	3–0
Žalgiris (Lithuania)	3–1	(Armenia) Pyunik	2–0	1–1
Beroe Stara Zagora (Bulgaria)	3–6	(Israel) Hapoel Tel Aviv	1–4	2–2
Honka (Finland)	2–5	(Poland) Lech Poznań	1–3	1–2
Red Star Belgrade (Serbia)	2–0	(Iceland) ÍBV	2–0	0–0
Shakhtyor Soligorsk (Belarus)	2–2 (2–4 p)	(Moldova) Milsami Orhei	1–1	1–1 (a.e.t.)
Vojvodina (Serbia)	5–1	(Hungary) Honvéd	2–0	3–1
Olimpija Ljubljana (Slovenia)	3–3 (a)	(Slovakia) Žilina	3–1	0–2
Tromsø (Norway)	2–1	(Azerbaijan) Inter Baku	2–0	0–1
Chornomorets Odesa (Ukraine)	3–2	(Moldova) Dacia Chișinău	2–0	1–2
IFK Göteborg (Sweden)	1–2	(Slovakia) Trenčín	0–0	1–2
Dinamo Minsk (Belarus)	4–4 (a)	(Croatia) Lokomotiva Zagreb	1–2	3–2
KR (Iceland)	2–6	(Belgium) Standard Liège	1–3	1–3
Zrinjski Mostar (Bosnia and Herzegovina)	1–3	(Bulgaria) Botev Plovdiv	1–1	0–2
Qarabağ (Azerbaijan)	4–3	(Poland) Piast Gliwice	2–1	2–2 (a.e.t.)
Rosenborg (Norway)	1–2	(Scotland) St Johnstone	0–1	1–1
Trabzonspor (Turkey)	7–2	(Republic of Ireland) Derry City	4–2	3–0
Valletta (Malta)	1–3	(Belarus) Minsk	1–1	0–2
Mladost Podgorica (Montenegro)	3–2	(Slovakia) Senica	2–2	1–0
Anorthosis Famagusta (Cyprus)	3–4	(Sweden) Gefle IF	3–0	0–4
Breiðablik (Iceland)	1–0	(Austria) Sturm Graz	0–0	1–0
Irtysh (Kazakhstan)	3–4	(Bosnia and Herzegovina) Široki Brijeg	3–2	0–2
Differdange 03 (Luxembourg)	5–4	(Netherlands) Utrecht	2–1	3–3

=== Matches ===
18 July 2013
20:15

Sparta Prague (Czech Republic)	2–2	(Sweden) BK Häcken
Lafata 33', 66'	Report	Mohammed 69'; Makondele 77'

Generali Arena, Prague
Attendance: 7,445
Referee: Javier Estrada Fernández (Spain)
25 July 2013
19:00

BK Häcken (Sweden)	1–0	(Czech Republic) Sparta Prague
Ericsson 84'	Report

Ullevi, Gothenburg
Attendance: 2,618
Referee: Tobias Welz (Germany)

BK Häcken won 3–2 on aggregate.

18 July 2013
19:30

Kukësi (Albania)	3–2	(Bosnia and Herzegovina) Sarajevo
Hoxha 24'; Popović 45+1'; Allmuça 58'	Report	Popović 32' (o.g.); Todorović 33'

Qemal Stafa Stadium, Tirana
Attendance: 4,500
Referee: Adrien Jaccottet (Switzerland)
25 July 2013
21:00

Sarajevo (Bosnia and Herzegovina)	0–0	(Albania) Kukësi
	Report

Asim Ferhatović Hase Stadium, Sarajevo
Attendance: 14,000
Referee: Mikhail Vilkov (Russia)

Kukësi won 3–2 on aggregate.

18 July 2013
19:30

Thun (Switzerland)	2–0	(Georgia (country)) Chikhura Sachkhere
Sanogo 12'; Schirinzi 38'	Report

Arena Thun, Thun
Attendance: 3,114
Referee: Ivaylo Stoyanov (Bulgaria)
25 July 2013
18:00

Chikhura Sachkhere (Georgia (country))	1–3	(Switzerland) Thun
Rekhviashvili 6'	Report	Lomashvili 45' (o.g.); Cássio 49'; M. Schneuwly 84'

Mikheil Meskhi Stadium, Tbilisi
Attendance: 1,400
Referee: Ante Vučemilović-Šimunović Jr. (Croatia)

Thun won 5–1 on aggregate.

18 July 2013
20:15

Skoda Xanthi (Greece)	0–1	(Northern Ireland) Linfield
	Report	A. Burns 25'

Skoda Xanthi Arena, Xanthi
Attendance: 2,117
Referee: Nicolas Rainville (France)
25 July 2013
20:45

Linfield (Northern Ireland)	1–2 (a.e.t.)	(Greece) Skoda Xanthi
Gault 99'	Report	Marcelinho 26', 105'

Windsor Park, Belfast
Attendance: 2,494
Referee: Aleksei Eskov (Russia)

2–2 on aggregate; Skoda Xanthi won on away goals.

18 July 2013
19:00

Hødd (Norway)	1–0	(Kazakhstan) Aktobe
Standal 28'	Report

Høddvoll Stadion, Ulsteinvik
Attendance: 2,019
Referee: Stavros Tritsonis (Greece)
25 July 2013
18:00

Aktobe (Kazakhstan)	2–0	(Norway) Hødd
Davydov 5', 61'	Report

Aktobe Central Stadium, Aktobe
Attendance: 12,200
Referee: Mete Kalkavan (Turkey)

Aktobe won 2–1 on aggregate.

18 July 2013
16:00

Dila Gori (Georgia (country))	3–0	(Denmark) AaB
Modebadze 61'; Gorelishvili 68', 90'	Report

Mikheil Meskhi Stadium, Tbilisi
Attendance: 3,500
Referee: Marco Fritz (Germany)
25 July 2013
20:15

AaB (Denmark)	0–0	(Georgia (country)) Dila Gori
	Report

Nordjyske Arena, Aalborg
Attendance: 5,472
Referee: Robert Malek (Poland)

Dila Gori won 3–0 on aggregate.

18 July 2013
19:00

Maccabi Haifa (Israel)	2–0	(Azerbaijan) Khazar Lankaran
Ezra 37'; Turgeman 55'	Report

Kiryat Eliezer, Haifa
Attendance: 9,520
Referee: Slavko Vinčić (Slovenia)
25 July 2013
18:00

Khazar Lankaran (Azerbaijan)	0–8	(Israel) Maccabi Haifa
	Report	Turgeman 7'; Katan 10'; Rayo 13' (pen.), 62'; Abuhatzira 26', 44'; Ezra 41'; Golasa 76'

Lankaran City Stadium, Lankaran
Attendance: 9,000
Referee: Danny Makkelie (Netherlands)

Maccabi Haifa won 10–0 on aggregate.

18 July 2013
20:30

Hajduk Split (Croatia)	2–1	(North Macedonia) Turnovo
Bencun 8'; Maloča 79'	Report	Blaževski 45+1' (pen.)

Stadion Poljud, Split
Referee: Richard Liesveld (Netherlands)
25 July 2013
17:45

Turnovo (North Macedonia)	1–1	(Croatia) Hajduk Split
Pandev 70'	Report	Caktaš 60'

Philip II Arena, Skopje
Attendance: 2,973
Referee: Arnold Hunter (Northern Ireland)

Hajduk Split won 3–2 on aggregate.

18 July 2013
17:00

Ventspils (Latvia)	1–0	(Luxembourg) Jeunesse Esch
Hoffmann 10' (o.g.)	Report

Ventspils Olimpiskais Stadions, Ventspils
Attendance: 1,300
Referee: Sergey Lapochkin (Russia)
25 July 2013
18:00

Jeunesse Esch (Luxembourg)	1–4	(Latvia) Ventspils
Benichou 39'	Report	Paulius 33'; Žigajevs 47'; Yanchuk 51'; Turkovs 65'

Stade de la Frontière, Esch-sur-Alzette
Attendance: 1,249
Referee: Ján Valášek (Slovakia)

Ventspils won 5–1 on aggregate.

18 July 2013
20:30

Astra Giurgiu (Romania)	1–1	(Cyprus) Omonia
Tembo 8'	Report	João Paulo 66'

Arena Națională, Bucharest
Attendance: 2,164
Referee: Maksim Layushkin (Russia)
25 July 2013
19:00

Omonia (Cyprus)	1–2	(Romania) Astra Giurgiu
Gikiewicz 55'	Report	Scaramozzino 39' (o.g.); Budescu 69'

GSP Stadium, Nicosia
Attendance: 18,271
Referee: Steven McLean (Scotland)

Astra Giurgiu won 3–2 on aggregate.

18 July 2013
18:30

Skonto (Latvia)	2–1	(Czech Republic) Slovan Liberec
Šabala 39'; Karašausks 47'	Report	Grybauskas 8' (o.g.)

Skonto Stadium, Riga
Attendance: 2,300
Referee: Daniel Stefański (Poland)
25 July 2013
19:00

Slovan Liberec (Czech Republic)	1–0	(Latvia) Skonto
Delarge 14'	Report

Stadion u Nisy, Liberec
Attendance: 5,707
Referee: Ken Henry Johnsen (Norway)

2–2 on aggregate; Slovan Liberec won on away goals.

16 July 2013
18:00

Levadia Tallinn (Estonia)	0–0	(Romania) Pandurii Târgu Jiu
	Report

Kadriorg Stadium, Tallinn
Attendance: 2,848
Referee: Marco Borg (Malta)
25 July 2013
19:00

Pandurii Târgu Jiu (Romania)	4–0	(Estonia) Levadia Tallinn
Matulevičius 7'; Erico 35', 57'; Breeveld 39'	Report

Tudor Vladimirescu, Târgu Jiu
Attendance: 4,270
Referee: Tamás Bognár (Hungary)

Pandurii Târgu Jiu won 4–0 on aggregate.

18 July 2013
20:45

Śląsk Wrocław (Poland)	4–0	(Montenegro) Rudar Pljevlja
Marco Paixão 5', 9'; Sobota 56'; Plaku 70'	Report

Stadion Wrocław, Wrocław
Attendance: 14,700
Referee: Andreas Ekberg (Sweden)
25 July 2013
17:30

Rudar Pljevlja (Montenegro)	2–2	(Poland) Śląsk Wrocław
Jovanović 57'; Bambur 90+2'	Report	Sobota 31'; Paixão 34'

Podgorica City Stadium, Podgorica
Attendance: 367
Referee: Luc Wouters (Belgium)

Śląsk Wrocław won 6–2 on aggregate.

18 July 2013
19:00

Malmö FF (Sweden)	2–0	(Scotland) Hibernian
Hamad 11'; Eriksson 13'	Report

Swedbank Stadion, Malmö
Attendance: 8,628
Referee: Rene Eisner (Austria)
25 July 2013
20:45

Hibernian (Scotland)	0–7	(Sweden) Malmö FF
	Report	Eriksson 21'; Forsberg 26'; Halsti 30'; Albornoz 42'; Rantie 60'; Hamad 64'; Kroon 73'

Easter Road, Edinburgh
Attendance: 16,108
Referee: Sébastien Delferiere (Belgium)

Malmö FF won 9–0 on aggregate.

18 July 2013
20:00

Jagodina (Serbia)	2–3	(Russia) Rubin Kazan
Damjanović 72'; Lepović 90+2'	Report	Prudnikov 12'; Natcho 21'; Rondón 87'

Jagodina City Stadium, Jagodina
Attendance: 4,000
Referee: Kenn Hansen (Denmark)
25 July 2013
17:00

Rubin Kazan (Russia)	1–0	(Serbia) Jagodina
Karadeniz 52'	Report

Central Stadium, Kazan
Attendance: 5,986
Referee: Antti Munukka (Finland)

Rubin Kazan won 4–2 on aggregate.

18 July 2013
19:00

Strømsgodset (Norway)	2–2	(Hungary) Debrecen
Horn 53'; Kovács 90+3'	Report	Sidibe 36', 55' (pen.)

Marienlyst Stadion, Drammen
Attendance: 3,582
Referee: Marius Avram (Romania)
25 July 2013
20:30

Debrecen (Hungary)	0–3	(Norway) Strømsgodset
	Report	Kovács 35'; Adjei-Boateng 51'; Storflor 58'

Sóstói Stadion, Nyíregyháza
Attendance: 6,300
Referee: Ilias Spathas (Greece)

Strømsgodset won 5–2 on aggregate.

18 July 2013
19:00

Petrolul Ploiești (Romania)	3–0	(Faroe Islands) Víkingur Gøta
Pablo 26'; Grozav 49', 68'	Report

Ilie Oană, Ploiești
Attendance: 9,854
Referee: Marios Panayi (Cyprus)
25 July 2013
20:00

Víkingur Gøta (Faroe Islands)	0–4	(Romania) Petrolul Ploiești
	Report	A. Gregersen 5' (o.g.); Younés 11', 63'; Grozav 77'

Svangaskarð, Toftir
Attendance: 288
Referee: Saïd Ennjimi (France)

Petrolul Ploiești won 7–0 on aggregate.

18 July 2013
21:00

Rijeka (Croatia)	5–0	(Wales) Prestatyn Town
Benko 19', 23', 59'; Jugović 67'; Zlomislić 85'	Report

Stadion Kantrida, Rijeka
Attendance: 6,660
Referee: Carlos Clos Gómez (Spain)
25 July 2013
20:00

Prestatyn Town (Wales)	0–3	(Croatia) Rijeka
	Report	Močinić 37'; Boras 40'; Mujanović 65'

Belle Vue, Rhyl
Attendance: 930
Referee: Dimitar Meckarovski (Macedonia)

Rijeka won 8–0 on aggregate.

18 July 2013
20:10

Žalgiris (Lithuania)	2–0	(Armenia) Pyunik
Biliński 46'; Leliūga 66'	Report

LFF Stadium, Vilnius
Attendance: 4,500
Referee: Menashe Masiah (Israel)
25 July 2013
18:00

Pyunik (Armenia)	1–1	(Lithuania) Žalgiris
Ayvazyan 55'	Report	Kuklys 88' (pen.)

Republican Stadium, Yerevan
Attendance: 3,500
Referee: Harald Lechner (Austria)

Žalgiris won 3–1 on aggregate.

18 July 2013
18:30

Beroe Stara Zagora (Bulgaria)	1–4	(Israel) Hapoel Tel Aviv
Hristov 25'	Report	Sasha 5'; Damari 9', 53'; Shechter 60'

Beroe Stadium, Stara Zagora
Attendance: 9,500
Referee: Vlado Glodjović (Serbia)
25 July 2013
19:00

Hapoel Tel Aviv (Israel)	2–2	(Bulgaria) Beroe Stara Zagora
Damari 22' (pen.), 61'	Report	Krumov 45+1'; Caiado 71'

Bloomfield Stadium, Tel Aviv
Attendance: 6,400
Referee: Carlos Xistra (Portugal)

Hapoel Tel Aviv won 6–3 on aggregate.

18 July 2013
18:00

Honka (Finland)	1–3	(Poland) Lech Poznań
Vasara 17'	Report	Ubiparip 11'; Teodorczyk 53'; Kamiński 71'

ISS Stadion, Vantaa
Attendance: 3,126
Referee: Lee Probert (England)
25 July 2013
20:45

Lech Poznań (Poland)	2–1	(Finland) Honka
Teodorczyk 6'; Kędziora 40'	Report	Koskinen 8'

INEA Stadion, Poznań
Attendance: 15,103
Referee: Eitan Shemeulevitch (Israel)

Lech Poznań won 5–2 on aggregate.

18 July 2013
20:30

Red Star Belgrade (Serbia)	2–0	(Iceland) ÍBV
Pečnik 12'; Mijailović 76'	Report

Red Star Stadium, Belgrade
Attendance: 32,886
Referee: Luca Banti (Italy)
25 July 2013
20:30

ÍBV (Iceland)	0–0	(Serbia) Red Star Belgrade
	Report

Hásteinsvöllur, Vestmannaeyjar
Attendance: 950
Referee: István Kovács (Romania)

Red Star Belgrade won 2–0 on aggregate.

18 July 2013
18:00

Shakhtyor Soligorsk (Belarus)	1–1	(Moldova) Milsami Orhei
Sitko 16'	Report	Leucă 56'

Stroitel Stadium, Salihorsk
Attendance: 2,700
Referee: Mattias Gestranius (Finland)
25 July 2013
17:00

Milsami Orhei (Moldova)	1–1 (a.e.t.)	(Belarus) Shakhtyor Soligorsk
Guilherme 6'	Report	Kashewski 30'
Penalties
Guilherme (penalty scored); Patraș (penalty scored); Iavorschi (penalty scored); Gheti (penalty missed); Ciofu (penalty scored)	4–2	(penalty scored) Kashewski; (penalty missed) Kolomyts; (penalty missed) Ryas; (penalty scored) Sitko

CSR Orhei, Orhei
Attendance: 2,500
Referee: Mihály Fábián (Hungary)

2–2 on aggregate; Milsami Orhei won 4–2 on penalties.

18 July 2013
20:30

Vojvodina (Serbia)	2–0	(Hungary) Honvéd
Trajković 19'; Vranješ 71' (pen.)	Report

Karađorđe Stadium, Novi Sad
Attendance: 5,000
Referee: Ruddy Buquet (France)
25 July 2013
20:30

Honvéd (Hungary)	1–3	(Serbia) Vojvodina
Diarra 44'	Report	Bilbija 27'; Alivodić 41'; Vranješ 64'

Bozsik József Stadion, Budapest
Attendance: 2,750
Referee: Stephan Studer (Switzerland)

Vojvodina won 5–1 on aggregate.

18 July 2013
20:45

Olimpija Ljubljana (Slovenia)	3–1	(Slovakia) Žilina
Šporar 19'; Đurković 26'; Ivelja 90+3'	Report	Škvarka 82'

Stožice Stadium, Ljubljana
Attendance: 1,400
Referee: Kristo Tohver (Estonia)
25 July 2013
17:30

Žilina (Slovakia)	2–0	(Slovenia) Olimpija Ljubljana
Paur 38', 55'	Report

Štadión pod Dubňom, Žilina
Attendance: 4,137
Referee: Jakob Kehlet (Denmark)

3–3 on aggregate; Žilina won on away goals.

18 July 2013
19:00

Tromsø (Norway)	2–0	(Azerbaijan) Inter Baku
Ondrášek 43'; Andersen 62'	Report

Alfheim Stadion, Tromsø
Attendance: 1,998
Referee: Yuriy Mozharovsky (Ukraine)
25 July 2013
18:00

Inter Baku (Azerbaijan)	1–0	(Norway) Tromsø
Tskhadadze 76'	Report

Bayil Stadium, Baku
Attendance: 2,100
Referee: Eli Hacmon (Israel)

Tromsø won 2–1 on aggregate.

18 July 2013
19:00

Chornomorets Odesa (Ukraine)	2–0	(Moldova) Dacia Chișinău
Samodin 46'; Antonov 90+4'	Report

Chornomorets Stadium, Odesa
Attendance: 20,230
Referee: Mike Dean (England)
25 July 2013
19:15

Dacia Chișinău (Moldova)	2–1	(Ukraine) Chornomorets Odesa
Orlovschi 45+3'; Orbu 64'	Report	Gai 26'

Zimbru Stadium, Chișinău
Attendance: 3,720
Referee: Serdar Gözübüyük (Netherlands)

Chornomorets Odesa won 3–2 on aggregate.

18 July 2013
19:00

IFK Göteborg (Sweden)	0–0	(Slovakia) Trenčín
	Report

Olympia, Helsingborg
Attendance: 4,282
Referee: Paolo Silvio Mazzoleni (Italy)
25 July 2013
17:00

Trenčín (Slovakia)	2–1	(Sweden) IFK Göteborg
Adi 15', 71'	Report	Haglund 82'

Štadión Zimný, Dubnica nad Váhom
Attendance: 4,150
Referee: Artur Soares Dias (Portugal)

Trenčín won 2–1 on aggregate.

18 July 2013
18:00

Dinamo Minsk (Belarus)	1–2	(Croatia) Lokomotiva Zagreb
Veselinović 62'	Report	Šitum 11'; Mišić 40'

Traktor Stadium, Minsk
Attendance: 4,850
Referee: Richard Trutz (Slovakia)
25 July 2013
20:00

Lokomotiva Zagreb (Croatia)	2–3	(Belarus) Dinamo Minsk
Mišić 68'; Šitum 72'	Report	Veselinović 41', 82'; Figueredo 59'

Stadion Maksimir, Zagreb
Attendance: 3,950
Referee: Kevin Clancy (Scotland)

4–4 on aggregate; Dinamo Minsk won on away goals.

18 July 2013
21:15

KR (Iceland)	1–3	(Belgium) Standard Liège
Finnbogason 35'	Report	Kanu 44'; Batshuayi 62'; M'Poku 90+1'

KR-völlur, Reykjavík
Attendance: 1,410
Referee: Christian Dingert (Germany)
25 July 2013
20:30

Standard Liège (Belgium)	3–1	(Iceland) KR
Bulot 26'; Ezekiel 68', 72'	Report	Atlason 69'

Stade Maurice Dufrasne, Liège
Attendance: 21,288
Referee: Yevhen Aranovskiy (Ukraine)

Standard Liège won 6–2 on aggregate.

18 July 2013
18:30

Zrinjski Mostar (Bosnia and Herzegovina)	1–1	(Bulgaria) Botev Plovdiv
Simeunović 21'	Report	Romario 48'

Bijeli Brijeg Stadium, Mostar
Attendance: 1,998
Referee: Padraig Sutton (Republic of Ireland)
25 July 2013
19:30

Botev Plovdiv (Bulgaria)	2–0	(Bosnia and Herzegovina) Zrinjski Mostar
Ognyanov 80'; Nedelev 88'	Report

Lazur Stadium, Burgas
Attendance: 8,000
Referee: Clément Turpin (France)

Botev Plovdiv won 3–1 on aggregate.

18 July 2013
18:00

Qarabağ (Azerbaijan)	2–1	(Poland) Piast Gliwice
Richard 40'; Reynaldo 83'	Report	Robak 19'

Tofiq Bahramov Stadium, Baku
Attendance: 11,000
Referee: Damir Batinić (Croatia)
25 July 2013
17:30

Piast Gliwice (Poland)	2–2 (a.e.t.)	(Azerbaijan) Qarabağ
Matras 29'; Robak 36'	Report	George 8'; Kapolongo 108'

Stadion Miejski, Gliwice
Attendance: 8,534
Referee: Stanislav Todorov (Bulgaria)

Qarabağ won 4–3 on aggregate.

18 July 2013
19:00

Rosenborg (Norway)	0–1	(Scotland) St Johnstone
	Report	Wright 18'

Lerkendal Stadion, Trondheim
Attendance: 5,952
Referee: Halis Özkahya (Turkey)
25 July 2013
20:45

St Johnstone (Scotland)	1–1	(Norway) Rosenborg
May 21'	Report	Søderlund 5'

McDiarmid Park, Perth
Attendance: 7,850
Referee: Miroslav Zelinka (Czech Republic)

St Johnstone won 2–1 on aggregate.

18 July 2013
20:30

Trabzonspor (Turkey)	4–2	(Republic of Ireland) Derry City
Mierzejewski 10'; Paulo Henrique 15'; Molloy 39' (o.g.); Kaçar 52'	Report	McDaid 24'; Kavanagh 32'

Hüseyin Avni Aker, Trabzon
Attendance: 17,213
Referee: Artyom Kuchin (Kazakhstan)
25 July 2013
20:45

Derry City (Republic of Ireland)	0–3	(Turkey) Trabzonspor
	Report	Paulo Henrique 56', 82'; Özdemir 90+1'

Brandywell Stadium, Derry
Attendance: 2,150
Referee: Michael Lerjéus (Sweden)

Trabzonspor won 7–2 on aggregate.

18 July 2013
19:30

Valletta (Malta)	1–1	(Belarus) Minsk
Fenech 45'	Report	Sachywka 6'

Ta' Qali National Stadium, Ta' Qali
Attendance: 1,104
Referee: Oliver Drachta (Austria)
25 July 2013
17:00

Minsk (Belarus)	2–0	(Malta) Valletta
Vasilyuk 53'; Kibuk 60'	Report

Torpedo Stadium, Zhodzina
Attendance: 1,500
Referee: Alexander Kostadinov (Bulgaria)

Minsk won 3–1 on aggregate.

18 July 2013
17:30

Mladost Podgorica (Montenegro)	2–2	(Slovakia) Senica
Knežević 54' (pen.); Ishihara 86'	Report	Kalabiška 34'; Diarrassouba 77'

Podgorica City Stadium, Podgorica
Attendance: 4,500
Referee: Vitali Meshkov (Russia)
25 July 2013
19:30

Senica (Slovakia)	0–1	(Montenegro) Mladost Podgorica
	Report	Kaljević 38'

Štadión FK Senica, Senica
Attendance: 3,908
Referee: Anar Salmanov (Azerbaijan)

Mladost Podgorica won 3–2 on aggregate.

18 July 2013
19:00

Anorthosis Famagusta (Cyprus)	3–0	(Sweden) Gefle IF
García 12' (pen.); Colautti 33', 84'	Report

Antonis Papadopoulos Stadium, Larnaca
Attendance: 2,400
Referee: Andrea De Marco (Italy)
25 July 2013
19:00

Gefle IF (Sweden)	4–0	(Cyprus) Anorthosis Famagusta
Orlov 25', 86'; Faltsetas 67'; Dahlberg 87'	Report

Norrporten Arena, Sundsvall
Attendance: 304
Referee: Kristinn Jakobsson (Iceland)

Gefle IF won 4–3 on aggregate.

18 July 2013
21:15

Breiðablik (Iceland)	0–0	(Austria) Sturm Graz
	Report

Kópavogsvöllur, Kópavogur
Attendance: 1,052
Referee: Ognjen Valjić (Bosnia and Herzegovina)
25 July 2013
18:00

Sturm Graz (Austria)	0–1	(Iceland) Breiðablik
	Report	Hreinsson 39'

UPC-Arena, Graz
Attendance: 7,903
Referee: Anastasios Sidiropoulos (Greece)

Breiðablik won 1–0 on aggregate.

18 July 2013
16:00

Irtysh (Kazakhstan)	3–2	(Bosnia and Herzegovina) Široki Brijeg
Shomko 14'; Yurin 41'; Suyumbayev 86'	Report	Kordić 56'; Šilić 64'

Pavlodar Central Stadium, Pavlodar
Attendance: 10,000
Referee: Paweł Raczkowski (Poland)
25 July 2013
20:30

Široki Brijeg (Bosnia and Herzegovina)	2–0	(Kazakhstan) Irtysh
Ješe 20'; Ivanković 76'	Report

Stadion Pecara, Široki Brijeg
Attendance: 4,000
Referee: Alan Kelly (Republic of Ireland)

Široki Brijeg won 4–3 on aggregate.

18 July 2013
19:30

Differdange 03 (Luxembourg)	2–1	(Netherlands) Utrecht
Er Rafik 26', 57'	Report	Mulenga 2'

Stade Josy Barthel, Luxembourg City
Attendance: 2,591
Referee: Alain Bieri (Switzerland)
25 July 2013
19:30

Utrecht (Netherlands)	3–3	(Luxembourg) Differdange 03
Mulenga 45', 49', 54'	Report	Er Rafik 25'; Franzoni 64' (pen.); Bastos 72'

Stadion Galgenwaard, Utrecht
Attendance: 16,437
Referee: Nikolay Yordanov (Bulgaria)

Differdange 03 won 5–4 on aggregate.
