= 2013–14 UEFA Europa League =

43rd season of Europe's secondary club football tournament organised by UEFA

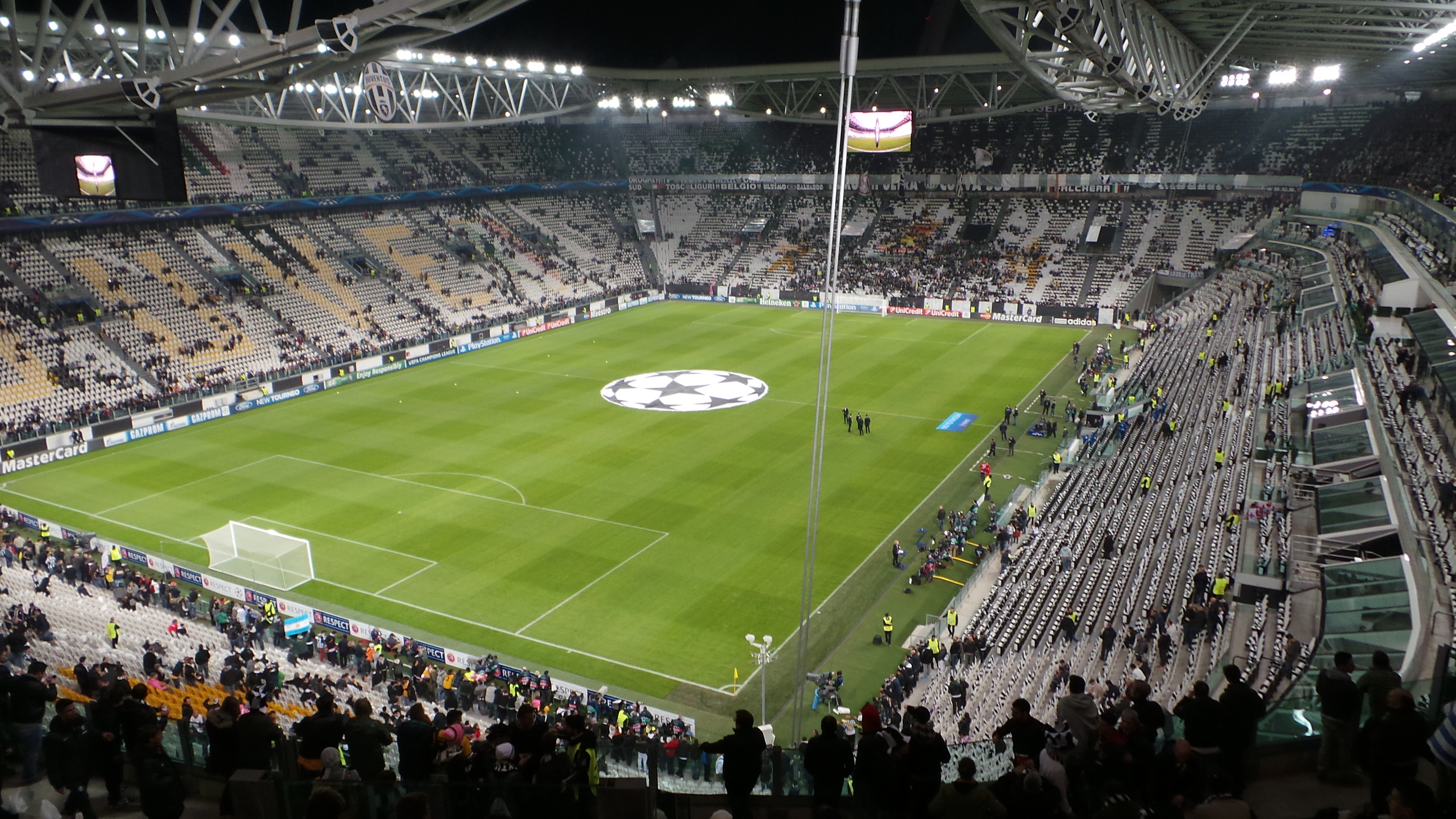
- The Juventus Stadium in Turin hosted the final

Tournament details
- Dates: 2 July – 29 August 2013 (qualifying); 19 September 2013 – 14 May 2014 (competition proper)
- Teams: 48+8 (competition proper); 161+33 (total) (from 53 associations)

Final positions
- Champions: (Spain) Sevilla (3rd title)
- Runners-up: (Portugal) Benfica

Tournament statistics
- Matches played: 205
- Goals scored: 475 (2.32 per match)
- Attendance: 3,411,208 (16,640 per match)
- Top scorer(s): Jonathan Soriano (Red Bull Salzburg); 8 goals

The 2013–14 UEFA Europa League was the 43rd season of Europe's secondary club football tournament organised by UEFA, and the fifth season under its current title.

The final was played between Sevilla and Benfica at the Juventus Stadium in Turin, Italy, which was won by Sevilla on penalties, giving them a record-equalling third UEFA Cup/Europa League title. Chelsea could not defend their title as they automatically qualified for the 2013–14 UEFA Champions League and also reached the knockout stage.

== Association team allocation ==
A total of 194 teams from 53 of the 54 UEFA member associations participated in the 2013–14 UEFA Europa League (the exception being Gibraltar, which started participating in the 2014–15 season after being admitted as a UEFA member in May 2013). The association ranking based on the UEFA country coefficients was used to determine the number of participating teams for each association:

- Associations 1–6 each had three teams qualify.
- Associations 7–9 each had four teams qualify.
- Associations 10–51 (except Liechtenstein) each had three teams qualify.
- Associations 52–53 each had two teams qualify.
- Liechtenstein had one team qualify (as it organised only a domestic cup and no domestic league).
- The top three associations of the 2012–13 UEFA Respect Fair Play ranking each gained an additional berth.
- Moreover, 33 teams eliminated from the 2013–14 UEFA Champions League were transferred to the Europa League.

The winners of the 2012–13 UEFA Europa League were given an additional entry as title holders if they did not qualify for the 2013–14 UEFA Champions League or Europa League through their domestic performance. However, this additional entry was not necessary for this season, because the title holders qualified for European competitions through their domestic performance.

=== Association ranking ===
For the 2013–14 UEFA Europa League, the associations were allocated places according to their 2012 UEFA country coefficients, which took into account their performance in European competitions from 2007–08 to 2011–12.

Apart from the allocation based on the country coefficients, associations may have additional teams participating in the Europa League, as noted below:

- (FP) – Additional berth via Fair Play ranking (Sweden, Norway, Finland)
- (UCL) – Additional teams transferred from the Champions League

| Rank | Association | Coeff. | Teams | Notes |
|---|---|---|---|---|
| 1 | England | 84.410 | 3 | |
| 2 | Spain | 84.186 | 3 | |
| 3 | Germany | 75.186 | 3 | |
| 4 | Italy | 59.981 | 3 | +2(UCL) |
| 5 | Portugal | 55.346 | 3 | +3(UCL) |
| 6 | France | 54.178 | 3 | +1(UCL) |
| 7 | Russia | 47.832 | 4 | |
| 8 | Netherlands | 45.515 | 4 | +2(UCL) |
| 9 | Ukraine | 45.133 | 4 | +1(UCL) |
| 10 | Greece | 37.100 | 3 | +1(UCL) |
| 11 | Turkey | 34.050 | 3 | |
| 12 | Belgium | 32.400 | 3 | +1(UCL) |
| 13 | Denmark | 27.525 | 3 | +1(UCL) |
| 14 | Switzerland | 26.800 | 3 | +2(UCL) |
| 15 | Austria | 26.325 | 3 | +1(UCL) |
| 16 | Cyprus | 25.499 | 3 | +1(UCL) |
| 17 | Israel | 22.000 | 3 | +1(UCL) |
| 18 | Scotland | 21.141 | 3 | |

| Rank | Association | Coeff. | Teams | Notes |
|---|---|---|---|---|
| 19 | Czech Republic | 20.350 | 3 | +1(UCL) |
| 20 | Poland | 19.916 | 3 | +1(UCL) |
| 21 | Croatia | 18.874 | 3 | +1(UCL) |
| 22 | Romania | 18.824 | 3 | |
| 23 | Belarus | 18.208 | 3 | |
| 24 | Sweden | 15.900 | 3 | +1(FP) +1(UCL) |
| 25 | Slovakia | 14.874 | 3 | |
| 26 | Norway | 14.675 | 3 | +1(FP) +1(UCL) |
| 27 | Serbia | 14.250 | 3 | +1(UCL) |
| 28 | Bulgaria | 14.250 | 3 | +1(UCL) |
| 29 | Hungary | 9.750 | 3 | |
| 30 | Finland | 9.133 | 3 | +1(FP) |
| 31 | Georgia | 8.666 | 3 | +1(UCL) |
| 32 | Bosnia and Herzegovina | 8.416 | 3 | |
| 33 | Republic of Ireland | 7.375 | 3 | |
| 34 | Slovenia | 7.124 | 3 | +1(UCL) |
| 35 | Lithuania | 6.875 | 3 | |
| 36 | Moldova | 6.749 | 3 | +1(UCL) |

| Rank | Association | Coeff. | Teams | Notes |
|---|---|---|---|---|
| 37 | Azerbaijan | 6.207 | 3 | |
| 38 | Latvia | 5.874 | 3 | |
| 39 | Macedonia | 5.666 | 3 | |
| 40 | Kazakhstan | 5.333 | 3 | +1(UCL) |
| 41 | Iceland | 5.332 | 3 | +1(UCL) |
| 42 | Montenegro | 4.375 | 3 | |
| 43 | Liechtenstein | 4.000 | 1 | |
| 44 | Albania | 3.916 | 3 | +1(UCL) |
| 45 | Malta | 3.083 | 3 | |
| 46 | Wales | 2.749 | 3 | |
| 47 | Estonia | 2.666 | 3 | +1(UCL) |
| 48 | Northern Ireland | 2.583 | 3 | |
| 49 | Luxembourg | 2.333 | 3 | |
| 50 | Armenia | 2.208 | 3 | |
| 51 | Faroe Islands | 1.416 | 3 | |
| 52 | Andorra | 1.000 | 2 | |
| 53 | San Marino | 0.916 | 2 | |
| 54 | Gibraltar | 0.000 | 0 | |

=== Distribution ===
Since the title holders (Chelsea) qualified for the Champions League through their domestic performance, the group stage spot reserved for the title holders was vacated, and the following changes to the default allocation system were made:

- The domestic cup winners of association 7 (Russia) were promoted from the play-off round to the group stage.
- The domestic cup winners of association 16 (Cyprus) were promoted from the third qualifying round to the play-off round.
- The domestic cup winners of association 19 (Czech Republic) were promoted from the second qualifying round to the third qualifying round.
- The domestic cup winners of associations 33 (Republic of Ireland) and 34 (Slovenia) were promoted from the first qualifying round to the second qualifying round.

| | Teams entering in this round | Teams advancing from previous round | Teams transferred from Champions League |
|---|---|---|---|
| First qualifying round (76 teams) | 19 domestic cup winners from associations 35–53; 25 domestic league runners-up from associations 28–53 (except Liechtenstein); 29 domestic league third-placed teams from associations 22–51 (except Liechtenstein); 3 teams which qualified via Fair Play ranking | | |
| Second qualifying round (80 teams) | 15 domestic cup winners from associations 20–34; 12 domestic league runners-up from associations 16–27; 6 domestic league third-placed teams from associations 16–21; 6 domestic league fourth-placed teams from associations 10–15; 3 domestic league fifth-placed teams from associations 7–9 | 38 winners from the first qualifying round | |
| Third qualifying round (58 teams) | 3 domestic cup winners from associations 17–19; 6 domestic league third-placed teams from associations 10–15; 3 domestic league fourth-placed teams from associations 7–9; 3 domestic league fifth-placed teams from associations 4–6 (League Cup winners for France); 3 domestic league sixth-placed teams from associations 1–3 (League Cup winners for England) | 40 winners from the second qualifying round | |
| Play-off round (62 teams) | 9 domestic cup winners from associations 8–16; 3 domestic league third-placed teams from associations 7–9; 3 domestic league fourth-placed teams from associations 4–6; 3 domestic league fifth-placed teams from associations 1–3 | 29 winners from the third qualifying round | 15 losers from the Champions League third qualifying round |
| Group stage (48 teams) | 7 domestic cup winners from associations 1–7 | 31 winners from the play-off round | 10 losers from the Champions League play-off round |
| Knockout phase (32 teams) | | 12 group winners from the group stage; 12 group runners-up from the group stage | 8 third-placed teams from the Champions League group stage |

==== Redistribution rules ====
A Europa League place was vacated when a team qualified for both the Champions League and the Europa League, or qualified for the Europa League by more than one method. When a place was vacated, it was redistributed within the national association by the following rules:

- When the domestic cup winners (considered as the "highest-placed" qualifier within the national association with the latest starting round) also qualified for the Champions League, their Europa League place was vacated. As a result, either of the following teams qualified for the Europa League:
  - The domestic cup runners-up, provided they had not yet qualified for European competitions, qualified for the Europa League as the "lowest-placed" qualifier (with the earliest starting round), with the other Europa League qualifiers moved up one "place".
  - Otherwise, the highest-placed team in the league which had not yet qualified for European competitions qualified for the Europa League, with the Europa League qualifiers which finished above them in the league moved up one "place".
- When the domestic cup winners also qualified for the Europa League through league position, their place through the league position was vacated. As a result, the highest-placed team in the league which had not yet qualified for European competitions qualified for the Europa League, with the Europa League qualifiers which finished above them in the league moved up one "place" if possible.
- For associations where a Europa League place was reserved for the League Cup winners, they always qualified for the Europa League as the "lowest-placed" qualifier (or as the second "lowest-placed" qualifier in cases where the cup runners-up qualified as stated above). If the League Cup winners had already qualified for European competitions through other methods, this reserved Europa League place was taken by the highest-placed league team in the league which had not yet qualified for European competitions.
- A Fair Play place was taken by the highest-ranked team in the domestic Fair Play table which had not yet qualified for European competitions.

=== Teams ===
The labels in the parentheses show how each team qualified for the place of its starting round:

- TH: Title holders
- CW: Cup winners
- CR: Cup runners-up
- LC: League Cup winners
- 2nd, 3rd, 4th, 5th, 6th, etc.: League position
- P-W: End-of-season European competition play-offs winners
- FP: Fair Play
- UCL: Transferred from the Champions League
  - GS: Third-placed teams from the group stage
  - PO: Losers from the play-off round
  - Q3: Losers from the third qualifying round

Round of 32
| (Ukraine) Shakhtar Donetsk (UCL GS) | (Portugal) Benfica (UCL GS) | (Switzerland) Basel (UCL GS) | (Portugal) Porto (UCL GS) |
| (Italy) Juventus (UCL GS) | (Czech Republic) Viktoria Plzeň (UCL GS) | (Italy) Napoli (UCL GS) | (Netherlands) Ajax (UCL GS) |
Group stage
| (England) Wigan Athletic (CW) | (France) Bordeaux (CW) | (Kazakhstan) Shakhter Karagandy (UCL PO) | (Netherlands) PSV Eindhoven (UCL PO) |
| (Spain) Valencia (5th) | (Russia) Anzhi Makhachkala (3rd) | (Poland) Legia Warsaw (UCL PO) | (Turkey) ~~Fenerbahçe~~ (UCL PO) |
| (Germany) SC Freiburg (5th) | (Croatia) Dinamo Zagreb (UCL PO) | (France) Lyon (UCL PO) | |
| (Italy) Lazio (CW) | (Bulgaria) Ludogorets Razgrad (UCL PO) | (Greece) PAOK (UCL PO) | |
| (Portugal) Vitória de Guimarães (CW) | (Slovenia) Maribor (UCL PO) | (Portugal) Paços de Ferreira (UCL PO) | |
Play-off round
| (England) Tottenham Hotspur (5th) | (Ukraine) Dynamo Kyiv (3rd) | (Israel) Maccabi Tel Aviv (UCL Q3) | (Moldova) Sheriff Tiraspol (UCL Q3) |
| (Spain) Real Betis (7th) | (Ukraine) Dnipro Dnipropetrovsk (4th) | (Norway) Molde (UCL Q3) | (Denmark) Nordsjælland (UCL Q3) |
| (Germany) Eintracht Frankfurt (6th) | (Greece) Atromitos (3rd) | (Serbia) Partizan (UCL Q3) | (Austria) Red Bull Salzburg (UCL Q3) |
| (Italy) Fiorentina (4th) | (Turkey) ~~Beşiktaş~~ (3rd) | (Georgia (country)) Dinamo Tbilisi (UCL Q3) | (Greece) ~~PAOK~~ (UCL Q3) |
| (Portugal) Braga (4th) | (Belgium) Genk (CW) | (Cyprus) APOEL (UCL Q3) | (Belgium) Zulte Waregem (UCL Q3) |
| (France) Nice (4th) | (Denmark) Esbjerg (CW) | (Sweden) IF Elfsborg (UCL Q3) | (Switzerland) Grasshopper (UCL Q3) |
| (Russia) Spartak Moscow (4th) | (Switzerland) St. Gallen (3rd) | (Albania) Skënderbeu (UCL Q3) | |
| (Netherlands) AZ (CW) | (Austria) Pasching (CW) | (Iceland) FH (UCL Q3) | |
| (Netherlands) Feyenoord (3rd) | (Cyprus) Apollon Limassol (CW) | (Estonia) Nõmme Kalju (UCL Q3) | |
Third qualifying round
| (England) Swansea City (LC) | (France) Saint-Étienne (LC) | (Turkey) Bursaspor (4th) | (Israel) Hapoel Ramat Gan (CW) |
| (Spain) Sevilla (9th) | (Russia) Kuban Krasnodar (5th) | (Belgium) Club Brugge (3rd) | (Scotland) Motherwell (2nd) |
| (Germany) VfB Stuttgart (CR) | (Netherlands) Vitesse (4th) | (Denmark) Randers (3rd) | (Czech Republic) Jablonec (CW) |
| (Italy) Udinese (5th) | (Ukraine) Metalurh Donetsk (5th) | (Switzerland) Zürich (4th) | |
| (Portugal) Estoril (5th) | (Greece) Asteras Tripolis (4th) | (Austria) Rapid Wien (3rd) | |
Second qualifying round
| (Russia) Rubin Kazan (6th) | (Israel) Maccabi Haifa (2nd) | (Croatia) Rijeka (3rd) | (Serbia) Jagodina (CW) |
| (Netherlands) Utrecht (P-W) | (Israel) Hapoel Tel Aviv (3rd) | (Romania) Petrolul Ploiești (CW) | (Serbia) Red Star Belgrade (2nd) |
| (Ukraine) Chornomorets Odesa (CR) | (Scotland) St Johnstone (3rd) | (Romania) Pandurii Târgu Jiu (2nd) | (Bulgaria) Beroe Stara Zagora (CW) |
| (Greece) Skoda Xanthi (7th) | (Scotland) Hibernian (CR) | (Belarus) Minsk (CW) | (Hungary) Debrecen (CW) |
| (Turkey) Trabzonspor (CR) | (Czech Republic) Sparta Prague (2nd) | (Belarus) Shakhtyor Soligorsk (2nd) | (Finland) Honka (CW) |
| (Belgium) Standard Liège (P-W) | (Czech Republic) Slovan Liberec (3rd) | (Sweden) IFK Göteborg (CW) | (Georgia (country)) Dila Gori (2nd) |
| (Denmark) AaB (5th) | (Poland) Lech Poznań (2nd) | (Sweden) BK Häcken (2nd) | (Bosnia and Herzegovina) Široki Brijeg (CW) |
| (Switzerland) Thun (5th) | (Poland) Śląsk Wrocław (3rd) | (Slovakia) Senica (2nd) | (Republic of Ireland) Derry City (CW) |
| (Austria) Sturm Graz (4th) | (Poland) Piast Gliwice (4th) | (Slovakia) Trenčín (3rd) | (Slovenia) Olimpija Ljubljana (2nd) |
| (Cyprus) Anorthosis Famagusta (2nd) | (Croatia) Hajduk Split (CW) | (Norway) Hødd (CW) | |
| (Cyprus) Omonia (3rd) | (Croatia) Lokomotiva Zagreb (2nd) | (Norway) Strømsgodset (2nd) | |
First qualifying round
| (Romania) Astra Giurgiu (4th) | (Slovenia) Celje (CR) | (Iceland) KR (CW) | (Northern Ireland) Glentoran (CW) |
| (Belarus) Dinamo Minsk (3rd) | (Lithuania) Žalgiris (CW) | (Iceland) Breiðablik (2nd) | (Northern Ireland) Crusaders (2nd) |
| (Sweden) Malmö FF (3rd) | (Lithuania) Sūduva (3rd) | (Iceland) ÍBV (3rd) | (Northern Ireland) Linfield (3rd) |
| (Slovakia) Žilina (CR) | (Lithuania) Kruoja Pakruojis (4th) | (Montenegro) Čelik Nikšić (3rd) | (Luxembourg) Jeunesse Esch (CW) |
| (Norway) Rosenborg (3rd) | (Moldova) Tiraspol (CW) | (Montenegro) Rudar Pljevlja (5th) | (Luxembourg) F91 Dudelange (2nd) |
| (Serbia) Vojvodina (3rd) | (Moldova) Dacia Chișinău (2nd) | (Montenegro) Mladost Podgorica (6th) | (Luxembourg) Differdange 03 (4th) |
| (Bulgaria) Levski Sofia (2nd) | (Moldova) Milsami Orhei (4th) | (Liechtenstein) Vaduz (CW) | (Armenia) Pyunik (CW) |
| (Bulgaria) Botev Plovdiv (4th) | (Azerbaijan) Qarabağ (2nd) | (Albania) Laçi (CW) | (Armenia) Mika (2nd) |
| (Hungary) Videoton (2nd) | (Azerbaijan) Inter Baku (3rd) | (Albania) Kukësi (2nd) | (Armenia) Gandzasar Kapan (3rd) |
| (Hungary) Honvéd (3rd) | (Azerbaijan) Khazar Lankaran (CR) | (Albania) Teuta (3rd) | (Faroe Islands) Víkingur Gøta (CW) |
| (Finland) Inter Turku (2nd) | (Latvia) Ventspils (CW) | (Malta) Hibernians (CW) | (Faroe Islands) ÍF (2nd) |
| (Finland) TPS (3rd) | (Latvia) Skonto (2nd) | (Malta) Valletta (3rd) | (Faroe Islands) HB (3rd) |
| (Georgia (country)) Torpedo Kutaisi (3rd) | (Latvia) Liepājas Metalurgs (4th) | (Malta) Sliema Wanderers (4th) | (Andorra) UE Santa Coloma (CW) |
| (Georgia (country)) Chikhura Sachkhere (CR) | (North Macedonia) Teteks (CW) | (Wales) Prestatyn Town (CW) | (Andorra) FC Santa Coloma (2nd) |
| (Bosnia and Herzegovina) Sarajevo (2nd) | (North Macedonia) Metalurg Skopje (2nd) | (Wales) Airbus UK Broughton (2nd) | (San Marino) La Fiorita (CW) |
| (Bosnia and Herzegovina) Zrinjski Mostar (9th) | (North Macedonia) Turnovo (3rd) | (Wales) Bala Town (P-W) | (San Marino) Libertas (2nd) |
| (Republic of Ireland) Drogheda United (2nd) | (Kazakhstan) Astana (CW) | (Estonia) Flora (CW) | (Sweden) Gefle IF (FP) |
| (Republic of Ireland) St Patrick's Athletic (3rd) | (Kazakhstan) Irtysh (2nd) | (Estonia) Levadia Tallinn (2nd) | (Norway) Tromsø (FP) |
| (Slovenia) Domžale (3rd) | (Kazakhstan) Aktobe (3rd) | (Estonia) Narva Trans (4th) | (Finland) Mariehamn (FP) |

Notably six teams that did not play in their national top-division took part in the competition. They were: Hapoel Ramat Gan (2nd tier), Hødd (2nd), Pasching (3rd), Teteks (2nd), Vaduz (2nd) and Wigan Athletic (2nd).

Notes

1. Bosnia and Herzegovina (BIH): Borac Banja Luka, the third-placed team of the 2012–13 Premier League of Bosnia and Herzegovina, would have qualified for the Europa League first qualifying round, but failed to obtain a UEFA licence. As a result, the berth was given to Zrinjski Mostar, the ninth-placed team of the league, which were the highest-placed team with a UEFA licence not yet qualified.
2. Bulgaria (BUL): CSKA Sofia, the third-placed team of the 2012–13 A PFG, would have qualified for the Europa League first qualifying round, but failed to obtain a UEFA licence, due to high financial debts and the following announcement of the club going in bankruptcy. As a result, the berth was given to Botev Plovdiv, the fourth-placed team of the league.
3. England (ENG): Swansea City are a club based in Wales, but participated in the Europa League through one of the berths for England as they won the 2012–13 Football League Cup (any coefficient points they earned counted toward England and not Wales).
4. Greece (GRE):
  - PAS Giannina, the fifth-placed team of the 2012–13 Super League Greece, would have qualified for the Europa League second qualifying round, but failed to obtain a UEFA licence. As a result, the berth was given to Skoda Xanthi, the seventh-placed team of the league, since Panathinaikos, the sixth-placed team of the league, also failed to obtain a UEFA licence.
  - On 14 August 2013, Metalist Kharkiv were disqualified from the 2013–14 UEFA club competitions because of previous match-fixing. UEFA decided to replace Metalist Kharkiv in the Champions League play-off round with PAOK, who were eliminated by Metalist Kharkiv in the third qualifying round.
5. Montenegro (MNE): Budućnost Podgorica and Grbalj, the winners of the 2012–13 Montenegrin Cup and the fourth-placed team of the 2012–13 Montenegrin First League respectively, would have qualified for the Europa League first qualifying round, but failed to obtain a UEFA licence. As a result, the berths were given to Rudar Pljevlja and Mladost Podgorica, the fifth- and sixth-placed teams of the league.
6. Republic of Ireland (IRL): Derry City are a club based in Northern Ireland, but participated in the Europa League through one of the berths for Republic of Ireland as they won the 2012 FAI Cup (any coefficient points they earned counted toward Republic of Ireland and not Northern Ireland).
7. Spain (ESP): Málaga, the sixth-placed team of the 2012–13 La Liga, would have qualified for the Europa League play-off round, but were banned by UEFA from participating due to violations of UEFA Financial Fair Play Regulations. As a result, Real Betis, the seventh-placed team of the league, entered the play-off round instead of the third qualifying round, and the third qualifying round berth was given to Sevilla, the ninth-placed team of the league, since Rayo Vallecano, the eighth-placed team of the league, failed to obtain a UEFA licence. Málaga unsuccessfully appealed the ban to the Court of Arbitration for Sport.
8. Turkey (TUR): On 25 June 2013, Beşiktaş and Fenerbahçe were banned by UEFA from the 2013–14 UEFA club competitions because of the 2011 Turkish sports corruption scandal. They appealed the ban to the Court of Arbitration for Sport, and on 18 July 2013 it was ruled that the ban should be temporarily lifted and they should be included in the qualifying round draws of the Champions League and Europa League, until the final decision to be made before the end of August 2013. Fenerbahçe competed in the Champions League qualifying rounds and lost in the play-off round, while Beşiktaş competed in the Europa League play-off round and won. On 28 and 30 August 2013, the Court of Arbitration for Sport upheld UEFA's ban on Fenerbahçe and Beşiktaş respectively, meaning the two clubs were banned from the 2013–14 UEFA Europa League. UEFA decided to replace Beşiktaş in the Europa League group stage with Tromsø, who were eliminated by Beşiktaş in the play-off round, while a draw was held to select a team to replace Fenerbahçe among the teams eliminated in the play-off round, and was won by APOEL.

== Round and draw dates ==
The schedule of the competition was as follows (all draws held at UEFA headquarters in Nyon, Switzerland, unless stated otherwise).

| Phase | Round | Draw date | First leg | Second leg |
|---|---|---|---|---|
| Qualifying | First qualifying round | 24 June 2013 | 4 July 2013 | 11 July 2013 |
| Qualifying | Second qualifying round | 24 June 2013 | 18 July 2013 | 25 July 2013 |
| Qualifying | Third qualifying round | 19 July 2013 | 1 August 2013 | 8 August 2013 |
| Play-off | Play-off round | 9 August 2013 | 22 August 2013 | 29 August 2013 |
| Group stage | Matchday 1 | 30 August 2013 (Monaco) | 19 September 2013 | |
| Group stage | Matchday 2 | 30 August 2013 (Monaco) | 3 October 2013 | |
| Group stage | Matchday 3 | 30 August 2013 (Monaco) | 24 October 2013 | |
| Group stage | Matchday 4 | 30 August 2013 (Monaco) | 7 November 2013 | |
| Group stage | Matchday 5 | 30 August 2013 (Monaco) | 28 November 2013 | |
| Group stage | Matchday 6 | 30 August 2013 (Monaco) | 12 December 2013 | |
| Knockout phase | Round of 32 | 16 December 2013 | 20 February 2014 | 27 February 2014 |
| Knockout phase | Round of 16 | 16 December 2013 | 13 March 2014 | 20 March 2014 |
| Knockout phase | Quarter-finals | 21 March 2014 | 3 April 2014 | 10 April 2014 |
| Knockout phase | Semi-finals | 11 April 2014 | 24 April 2014 | 1 May 2014 |
| Knockout phase | Final | 11 April 2014 | 14 May 2014 at Juventus Stadium, Turin | |

Matches in the qualifying, play-off, and knockout rounds may also be played on Tuesdays or Wednesdays instead of the regular Thursdays due to scheduling conflicts.

== Qualifying rounds ==
In the qualifying rounds and the play-off round, teams were divided into seeded and unseeded teams based on their 2013 UEFA club coefficients, and then drawn into two-legged home-and-away ties. Teams from the same association could not be drawn against each other.

=== First qualifying round ===
The draws for the first and second qualifying rounds were held on 24 June 2013. The first legs were played on 2, 3 and 4 July, and the second legs were played on 9, 10 and 11 July 2013.

Inter Turku lodged a protest after losing the second leg to Víkingur Gøta, and two match officials were later banned for life by UEFA for attempted match-fixing.

| Team 1 | Agg. | Team 2 | 1st leg | 2nd leg |
|---|---|---|---|---|
| Víkingur Gøta (Faroe Islands) | 2–1 | (Finland) Inter Turku | 1–1 | 1–0 |
| Žalgiris (Lithuania) | 4–3 | (Republic of Ireland) St Patrick's Athletic | 2–2 | 2–1 |
| Airbus UK Broughton (Wales) | 1–1 (a) | (Latvia) Ventspils | 1–1 | 0–0 |
| Narva Trans (Estonia) | 1–8 | (Sweden) Gefle IF | 0–3 | 1–5 |
| KR (Iceland) | 3–0 | (Northern Ireland) Glentoran | 0–0 | 3–0 |
| Chikhura Sachkhere (Georgia (country)) | 1–1 (a) | (Liechtenstein) Vaduz | 0–0 | 1–1 |
| Milsami Orhei (Moldova) | 1–0 | (Luxembourg) F91 Dudelange | 1–0 | 0–0 |
| Metalurg Skopje (North Macedonia) | 0–2 | (Azerbaijan) Qarabağ | 0–1 | 0–1 |
| Videoton (Hungary) | 2–2 (a) (Note: Order of legs reversed after original draw.) | (Montenegro) Mladost Podgorica | 2–1 | 0–1 |
| Flora (Estonia) | 1–1 (a) | (Albania) Kukësi | 1–1 | 0–0 |
| Teteks (North Macedonia) | 1–2 | (Armenia) Pyunik | 1–1 | 0–1 |
| Teuta (Albania) | 3–3 (a) | (Moldova) Dacia Chișinău | 3–1 | 0–2 |
| Sarajevo (Bosnia and Herzegovina) | 3–1 | (San Marino) Libertas | 1–0 | 2–1 |
| Sliema Wanderers (Malta) | 1–2 | (Azerbaijan) Khazar Lankaran | 1–1 | 0–1 |
| Levski Sofia (Bulgaria) | 0–2 | (Kazakhstan) Irtysh | 0–0 | 0–2 |
| Hibernians (Malta) | 3–7 | (Serbia) Vojvodina | 1–4 | 2–3 |
| Astana (Kazakhstan) | 0–6 | (Bulgaria) Botev Plovdiv | 0–1 | 0–5 |
| UE Santa Coloma (Andorra) | 1–4 | (Bosnia and Herzegovina) Zrinjski Mostar | 1–3 | 0–1 |
| Domžale (Slovenia) | 0–3 | (Romania) Astra Giurgiu | 0–1 | 0–2 |
| Rudar Pljevlja (Montenegro) | 2–1 | (Armenia) Mika | 1–0 | 1–1 |
| Breiðablik (Iceland) | 4–0 | (Andorra) FC Santa Coloma | 4–0 | 0–0 |
| Drogheda United (Republic of Ireland) | 0–2 | (Sweden) Malmö FF | 0–0 | 0–2 |
| Inter Baku (Azerbaijan) | 3–1 | (Finland) Mariehamn | 1–1 | 2–0 |
| ÍF (Faroe Islands) | 0–5 | (Northern Ireland) Linfield | 0–2 | 0–3 |
| Prestatyn Town (Wales) | 3–3 (4–3 p) | (Latvia) Liepājas Metalurgs | 1–2 | 2–1 (a.e.t.) |
| Tromsø (Norway) | 3–2 | (Slovenia) Celje | 1–2 | 2–0 |
| Tiraspol (Moldova) | 1–1 (2–4 p) | (Latvia) Skonto | 0–1 | 1–0 (a.e.t.) |
| Crusaders (Northern Ireland) | 3–9 | (Norway) Rosenborg | 1–2 | 2–7 |
| ÍBV (Iceland) | 2–1 | (Faroe Islands) HB | 1–1 | 1–0 |
| Jeunesse Esch (Luxembourg) | 3–2 | (Finland) TPS | 2–0 | 1–2 |
| Bala Town (Wales) | 2–3 | (Estonia) Levadia Tallinn | 1–0 | 1–3 |
| Kruoja Pakruojis (Lithuania) | 0–8 | (Belarus) Dinamo Minsk | 0–3 | 0–5 |
| La Fiorita (San Marino) | 0–4 | (Malta) Valletta | 0–3 | 0–1 |
| Laçi (Albania) | 1–3 | (Luxembourg) Differdange 03 | 0–1 | 1–2 |
| Gandzasar Kapan (Armenia) | 2–4 | (Kazakhstan) Aktobe | 1–2 | 1–2 |
| Čelik Nikšić (Montenegro) | 1–13 | (Hungary) Honvéd | 1–4 | 0–9 |
| Torpedo Kutaisi (Georgia (country)) | 3–6 | (Slovakia) Žilina | 0–3 | 3–3 |
| Sūduva (Lithuania) | 4–4 (4–5 p) | (North Macedonia) Turnovo | 2–2 | 2–2 (a.e.t.) |

=== Second qualifying round ===
The first legs were played on 16 and 18 July, and the second legs were played on 25 July 2013.

| Team 1 | Agg. | Team 2 | 1st leg | 2nd leg |
|---|---|---|---|---|
| Sparta Prague (Czech Republic) | 2–3 (Note: Order of legs reversed after original draw.) | (Sweden) BK Häcken | 2–2 | 0–1 |
| Kukësi (Albania) | 3–2 | (Bosnia and Herzegovina) Sarajevo | 3–2 | 0–0 |
| Thun (Switzerland) | 5–1 | (Georgia (country)) Chikhura Sachkhere | 2–0 | 3–1 |
| Skoda Xanthi (Greece) | 2–2 (a) | (Northern Ireland) Linfield | 0–1 | 2–1 (a.e.t.) |
| Hødd (Norway) | 1–2 | (Kazakhstan) Aktobe | 1–0 | 0–2 |
| Dila Gori (Georgia (country)) | 3–0 | (Denmark) AaB | 3–0 | 0–0 |
| Maccabi Haifa (Israel) | 10–0 | (Azerbaijan) Khazar Lankaran | 2–0 | 8–0 |
| Hajduk Split (Croatia) | 3–2 | (North Macedonia) Turnovo | 2–1 | 1–1 |
| Ventspils (Latvia) | 5–1 | (Luxembourg) Jeunesse Esch | 1–0 | 4–1 |
| Astra Giurgiu (Romania) | 3–2 | (Cyprus) Omonia | 1–1 | 2–1 |
| Skonto (Latvia) | 2–2 (a) | (Czech Republic) Slovan Liberec | 2–1 | 0–1 |
| Levadia Tallinn (Estonia) | 0–4 | (Romania) Pandurii Târgu Jiu | 0–0 | 0–4 |
| Śląsk Wrocław (Poland) | 6–2 | (Montenegro) Rudar Pljevlja | 4–0 | 2–2 |
| Malmö FF (Sweden) | 9–0 | (Scotland) Hibernian | 2–0 | 7–0 |
| Jagodina (Serbia) | 2–4 | (Russia) Rubin Kazan | 2–3 | 0–1 |
| Strømsgodset (Norway) | 5–2 | (Hungary) Debrecen | 2–2 | 3–0 |
| Petrolul Ploiești (Romania) | 7–0 | (Faroe Islands) Víkingur Gøta | 3–0 | 4–0 |
| Rijeka (Croatia) | 8–0 | (Wales) Prestatyn Town | 5–0 | 3–0 |
| Žalgiris (Lithuania) | 3–1 | (Armenia) Pyunik | 2–0 | 1–1 |
| Beroe Stara Zagora (Bulgaria) | 3–6 | (Israel) Hapoel Tel Aviv | 1–4 | 2–2 |
| Honka (Finland) | 2–5 | (Poland) Lech Poznań | 1–3 | 1–2 |
| Red Star Belgrade (Serbia) | 2–0 | (Iceland) ÍBV | 2–0 | 0–0 |
| Shakhtyor Soligorsk (Belarus) | 2–2 (2–4 p) | (Moldova) Milsami Orhei | 1–1 | 1–1 (a.e.t.) |
| Vojvodina (Serbia) | 5–1 | (Hungary) Honvéd | 2–0 | 3–1 |
| Olimpija Ljubljana (Slovenia) | 3–3 (a) | (Slovakia) Žilina | 3–1 | 0–2 |
| Tromsø (Norway) | 2–1 | (Azerbaijan) Inter Baku | 2–0 | 0–1 |
| Chornomorets Odesa (Ukraine) | 3–2 | (Moldova) Dacia Chișinău | 2–0 | 1–2 |
| IFK Göteborg (Sweden) | 1–2 | (Slovakia) Trenčín | 0–0 | 1–2 |
| Dinamo Minsk (Belarus) | 4–4 (a) | (Croatia) Lokomotiva Zagreb | 1–2 | 3–2 |
| KR (Iceland) | 2–6 | (Belgium) Standard Liège | 1–3 | 1–3 |
| Zrinjski Mostar (Bosnia and Herzegovina) | 1–3 | (Bulgaria) Botev Plovdiv | 1–1 | 0–2 |
| Qarabağ (Azerbaijan) | 4–3 | (Poland) Piast Gliwice | 2–1 | 2–2 (a.e.t.) |
| Rosenborg (Norway) | 1–2 | (Scotland) St Johnstone | 0–1 | 1–1 |
| Trabzonspor (Turkey) | 7–2 | (Republic of Ireland) Derry City | 4–2 | 3–0 |
| Valletta (Malta) | 1–3 | (Belarus) Minsk | 1–1 | 0–2 |
| Mladost Podgorica (Montenegro) | 3–2 | (Slovakia) Senica | 2–2 | 1–0 |
| Anorthosis Famagusta (Cyprus) | 3–4 | (Sweden) Gefle IF | 3–0 | 0–4 |
| Breiðablik (Iceland) | 1–0 | (Austria) Sturm Graz | 0–0 | 1–0 |
| Irtysh (Kazakhstan) | 3–4 | (Bosnia and Herzegovina) Široki Brijeg | 3–2 | 0–2 |
| Differdange 03 (Luxembourg) | 5–4 | (Netherlands) Utrecht | 2–1 | 3–3 |

=== Third qualifying round ===
The draw for the third qualifying round was held on 19 July 2013. The first legs were played on 1 August, and the second legs were played on 8 August 2013.

| Team 1 | Agg. | Team 2 | 1st leg | 2nd leg |
|---|---|---|---|---|
| Chornomorets Odesa (Ukraine) | 3–1 | (Serbia) Red Star Belgrade | 3–1 | 0–0 |
| Široki Brijeg (Bosnia and Herzegovina) | 1–7 | (Italy) Udinese | 1–3 | 0–4 |
| Ventspils (Latvia) | 0–3 | (Israel) Maccabi Haifa | 0–0 | 0–3 |
| Dinamo Minsk (Belarus) | 0–1 | (Turkey) Trabzonspor | 0–1 | 0–0 |
| Śląsk Wrocław (Poland) | 4–3 | (Belgium) Club Brugge | 1–0 | 3–3 |
| Trenčín (Slovakia) | 3–5 | (Romania) Astra Giurgiu | 1–3 | 2–2 |
| Swansea City (England) | 4–0 | (Sweden) Malmö FF | 4–0 | 0–0 |
| Petrolul Ploiești (Romania) | 3–2 | (Netherlands) Vitesse | 1–1 | 2–1 |
| Slovan Liberec (Czech Republic) | 4–2 | (Switzerland) Zürich | 2–1 | 2–1 |
| Aktobe (Kazakhstan) | 1–1 (2–1 p) | (Iceland) Breiðablik | 1–0 | 0–1 (a.e.t.) |
| Randers (Denmark) | 1–4 | (Russia) Rubin Kazan | 1–2 | 0–2 |
| Žalgiris (Lithuania) | 2–2 (a) | (Poland) Lech Poznań | 1–0 | 1–2 |
| Sevilla (Spain) | 9–1 | (Montenegro) Mladost Podgorica | 3–0 | 6–1 |
| Hajduk Split (Croatia) | 0–2 | (Georgia (country)) Dila Gori | 0–1 | 0–1 |
| Kukësi (Albania) | 2–1 | (Ukraine) Metalurh Donetsk | 2–0 | 0–1 |
| Pandurii Târgu Jiu (Romania) | 3–2 | (Israel) Hapoel Tel Aviv | 1–1 | 2–1 |
| Tromsø (Norway) | 1–1 (4–3 p) | (Luxembourg) Differdange 03 | 1–0 | 0–1 (a.e.t.) |
| Motherwell (Scotland) | 0–3 | (Russia) Kuban Krasnodar | 0–2 | 0–1 |
| Saint-Étienne (France) | 6–0 | (Moldova) Milsami Orhei | 3–0 | 3–0 |
| Jablonec (Czech Republic) | 5–2 | (Norway) Strømsgodset | 2–1 | 3–1 |
| Qarabağ (Azerbaijan) | 3–0 | (Sweden) Gefle IF | 1–0 | 2–0 |
| Rijeka (Croatia) | 3–2 | (Slovakia) Žilina | 2–1 | 1–1 |
| Asteras Tripolis (Greece) | 2–4 | (Austria) Rapid Wien | 1–1 | 1–3 |
| Botev Plovdiv (Bulgaria) | 1–1 (a) | (Germany) VfB Stuttgart | 1–1 | 0–0 |
| Estoril (Portugal) | 1–0 | (Israel) Hapoel Ramat Gan | 0–0 | 1–0 |
| Vojvodina (Serbia) | 5–2 | (Turkey) Bursaspor | 2–2 | 3–0 |
| Skoda Xanthi (Greece) | 2–4 | (Belgium) Standard Liège | 1–2 | 1–2 |
| BK Häcken (Sweden) | 1–3 | (Switzerland) Thun | 1–2 | 0–1 |
| Minsk (Belarus) | 1–1 (3–2 p) | (Scotland) St Johnstone | 0–1 | 1–0 (a.e.t.) |

== Play-off round ==
The draw for the play-off round was held on 9 August 2013. The first legs were played on 22 August, and the second legs were played on 29 August 2013.

| Team 1 | Agg. | Team 2 | 1st leg | 2nd leg |
|---|---|---|---|---|
| Kuban Krasnodar (Russia) | 3–1 | (Netherlands) Feyenoord | 1–0 | 2–1 |
| Zulte Waregem (Belgium) | 3–2 (Note: Following the completion of the play-offs, APOEL were drawn as the lucky loser to advance to the group stage (replacing the spot vacated by Fenerbahçe).) | (Cyprus) APOEL | 1–1 | 2–1 |
| Rapid Wien (Austria) | 4–0 | (Georgia (country)) Dila Gori | 1–0 | 3–0 |
| Tromsø (Norway) | 2–3 | (Turkey) Beşiktaş | 2–1 | 0–2 |
| Pandurii Târgu Jiu (Romania) | 2–1 | (Portugal) Braga | 0–1 | 2–0 (a.e.t.) |
| Apollon Limassol (Cyprus) | 2–1 | (France) Nice | 2–0 | 0–1 |
| Aktobe (Kazakhstan) | 3–8 | (Ukraine) Dynamo Kyiv | 2–3 | 1–5 |
| Swansea City (England) | 6–3 | (Romania) Petrolul Ploiești | 5–1 | 1–2 |
| Atromitos (Greece) | 3–3 (a) | (Netherlands) AZ | 1–3 | 2–0 |
| FH (Iceland) | 2–7 | (Belgium) Genk | 0–2 | 2–5 |
| IF Elfsborg (Sweden) | 2–1 | (Denmark) Nordsjælland | 1–1 | 1–0 |
| Sevilla (Spain) | 9–1 (Note: Order of legs reversed after original draw.) | (Poland) Śląsk Wrocław | 4–1 | 5–0 |
| Red Bull Salzburg (Austria) | 7–0 | (Lithuania) Žalgiris | 5–0 | 2–0 |
| Qarabağ (Azerbaijan) | 1–4 | (Germany) Eintracht Frankfurt | 0–2 | 1–2 |
| Minsk (Belarus) | 1–5 | (Belgium) Standard Liège | 0–2 | 1–3 |
| Jablonec (Czech Republic) | 1–8 | (Spain) Real Betis | 1–2 | 0–6 |
| Rijeka (Croatia) | 4–3 | (Germany) VfB Stuttgart | 2–1 | 2–2 |
| Chornomorets Odesa (Ukraine) | 1–1 (7–6 p) | (Albania) Skënderbeu | 1–0 | 0–1 (a.e.t.) |
| Maccabi Tel Aviv (Israel) | w/o (Note: On 14 August 2013, Metalist Kharkiv were disqualified from all 2013–14 UEFA club competitions because of previous match-fixing. UEFA decided to replace Metalist Kharkiv in the Champions League play-off round with PAOK, who were eliminated by Metalist Kharkiv in the third qualifying round of the Champions League. PAOK therefore vacated their place in the Europa League, and Maccabi Tel Aviv, the opponent drawn against PAOK in the Europa League play-off round, qualified directly for the Europa League group stage.) | (Greece) PAOK | Canc. | Canc. |
| St. Gallen (Switzerland) | 5–3 | (Russia) Spartak Moscow | 1–1 | 4–2 |
| Molde (Norway) | 0–5 | (Russia) Rubin Kazan | 0–2 | 0–3 |
| Vojvodina (Serbia) | 2–3 | (Moldova) Sheriff Tiraspol | 1–1 | 1–2 |
| Kukësi (Albania) | 1–5 | (Turkey) Trabzonspor | 0–2 | 1–3 |
| Esbjerg (Denmark) | 5–3 | (France) Saint-Étienne | 4–3 | 1–0 |
| Grasshopper (Switzerland) | 2–2 (a) | (Italy) Fiorentina | 1–2 | 1–0 |
| Maccabi Haifa (Israel) | 3–1 | (Romania) Astra Giurgiu | 2–0 | 1–1 |
| Udinese (Italy) | 2–4 | (Czech Republic) Slovan Liberec | 1–3 | 1–1 |
| Dinamo Tbilisi (Georgia (country)) | 0–8 | (England) Tottenham Hotspur | 0–5 | 0–3 |
| Estoril (Portugal) | 4–1 | (Austria) Pasching | 2–0 | 2–1 |
| Nõmme Kalju (Estonia) | 1–5 | (Ukraine) Dnipro Dnipropetrovsk | 1–3 | 0–2 |
| Partizan (Serbia) | 1–3 | (Switzerland) Thun | 1–0 | 0–3 |

== Group stage ==
Location of teams of the 2013–14 UEFA Europa League group stage.
Red: Group A; Yellow: Group B; Green: Group C; Dark green: Group D;
Purple: Group E; Pink: Group F; Blue: Group G; Orange: Group H;
Brown: Group I; Deep pink: Group J; Cyan: Group K; Spring green: Group L.

The draw for the group stage was held in Monaco on 30 August 2013. Prior to the draw, the Court of Arbitration for Sport upheld UEFA's ban on Fenerbahce (which lost in the Champions League play-off round) and Beşiktaş, meaning the two clubs were banned from the 2013–14 UEFA Europa League. UEFA decided to replace Beşiktaş in the Europa League group stage with Tromsø, who were eliminated by Beşiktaş in the play-off round, while a draw was held to select a team to replace Fenerbahçe among the teams eliminated in the play-off round, and was won by APOEL.

The 48 teams were allocated into four pots based on their 2013 UEFA club coefficients. They were drawn into twelve groups of four, with the restriction that teams from the same association could not be drawn against each other.

In each group, teams played against each other home-and-away in a round-robin format. The matchdays were 19 September, 3 October, 24 October, 7 November, 28 November, and 12 December 2013. The group winners and runners-up advanced to the round of 32, where they were joined by the 8 third-placed teams from the 2013–14 UEFA Champions League group stage.

A total of 27 associations were represented in the group stage. This was also the first time a team from Kazakhstan qualified for group stage. Swansea City, Kuban Krasnodar, Sankt Gallen, Ludogorets, Chornomorets Odesa, Esbjerg, Elfsborg, Zulte Waregem, Wigan Athletic, Paços de Ferreira, Pandurii Târgu Jiu, Eintracht Frankfurt, APOEL, Thun, Slovan Liberec, SC Freiburg, Estoril, Real Betis, Vitória de Guimarães, Rijeka, Trabzonspor, Apollon Limassol, Tromsø and Shakhter Karagandy all made their debut in UEFA Europa League group stage (although Elfsborg, Zulte Waregem, Eintracht Frankfurt, Slovan Liberec, Vitória de Guimarães and Tromsø played already in UEFA Cup as well as Thun, Real Betis, Trabzonspor already disputed the UEFA Cup/UEFA Europa League knockout stage).

- For tiebreakers if two or more teams are equal on points, see 2013–14 UEFA Europa League group stage#Tiebreakers

=== Group A ===
| Pos | Team | Pld | W | D | L | GF | GA | GD | Pts | Qualification | VAL | SWA | KUB | STG |
|---|---|---|---|---|---|---|---|---|---|---|---|---|---|---|
| 1 | (Spain) Valencia | 6 | 4 | 1 | 1 | 12 | 7 | +5 | 13 | Advance to knockout phase | — | 0–3 | 1–1 | 5–1 |
| 2 | (England) Swansea City | 6 | 2 | 2 | 2 | 6 | 4 | +2 | 8 | Advance to knockout phase | 0–1 | — | 1–1 | 1–0 |
| 3 | (Russia) Kuban Krasnodar | 6 | 1 | 3 | 2 | 7 | 7 | 0 | 6 (Note: Tied on head-to-head points (3). Head-to-head goal difference: Kuban Krasnodar +2, St. Gallen −2.) | | 0–2 | 1–1 | — | 4–0 |
| 4 | (Switzerland) St. Gallen | 6 | 2 | 0 | 4 | 6 | 13 | −7 | 6 | | 2–3 | 1–0 | 2–0 | — |

Source: Soccerway

=== Group B ===
| Pos | Team | Pld | W | D | L | GF | GA | GD | Pts | Qualification | LUD | CHO | PSV | DIN |
|---|---|---|---|---|---|---|---|---|---|---|---|---|---|---|
| 1 | (Bulgaria) Ludogorets Razgrad | 6 | 5 | 1 | 0 | 11 | 2 | +9 | 16 | Advance to knockout phase | — | 1–1 | 2–0 | 3–0 |
| 2 | (Ukraine) Chornomorets Odesa | 6 | 3 | 1 | 2 | 6 | 6 | 0 | 10 | Advance to knockout phase | 0–1 | — | 0–2 | 2–1 |
| 3 | (Netherlands) PSV Eindhoven | 6 | 2 | 1 | 3 | 4 | 5 | −1 | 7 | | 0–2 | 0–1 | — | 2–0 |
| 4 | (Croatia) Dinamo Zagreb | 6 | 0 | 1 | 5 | 3 | 11 | −8 | 1 | | 1–2 | 1–2 | 0–0 | — |

Source: Soccerway

=== Group C ===
| Pos | Team | Pld | W | D | L | GF | GA | GD | Pts | Qualification | SAL | ESB | ELF | STA |
|---|---|---|---|---|---|---|---|---|---|---|---|---|---|---|
| 1 | (Austria) Red Bull Salzburg | 6 | 6 | 0 | 0 | 15 | 3 | +12 | 18 | Advance to knockout phase | — | 3–0 | 4–0 | 2–1 |
| 2 | (Denmark) Esbjerg | 6 | 4 | 0 | 2 | 8 | 8 | 0 | 12 | Advance to knockout phase | 1–2 | — | 1–0 | 2–1 |
| 3 | (Sweden) IF Elfsborg | 6 | 1 | 1 | 4 | 5 | 10 | −5 | 4 | | 0–1 | 1–2 | — | 1–1 |
| 4 | (Belgium) Standard Liège | 6 | 0 | 1 | 5 | 6 | 13 | −7 | 1 | | 1–3 | 1–2 | 1–3 | — |

Source: Soccerway

=== Group D ===
| Pos | Team | Pld | W | D | L | GF | GA | GD | Pts | Qualification | RUB | MAR | ZUL | WIG |
|---|---|---|---|---|---|---|---|---|---|---|---|---|---|---|
| 1 | (Russia) Rubin Kazan | 6 | 4 | 2 | 0 | 14 | 4 | +10 | 14 | Advance to knockout phase | — | 1–1 | 4–0 | 1–0 |
| 2 | (Slovenia) Maribor | 6 | 2 | 1 | 3 | 9 | 12 | −3 | 7 (Note: Tied on head-to-head points (3). Head-to-head goal difference: Maribor +1, Zulte Waregem −1.) | Advance to knockout phase | 2–5 | — | 0–1 | 2–1 |
| 3 | (Belgium) Zulte Waregem | 6 | 2 | 1 | 3 | 4 | 10 | −6 | 7 | | 0–2 | 1–3 | — | 0–0 |
| 4 | (England) Wigan Athletic | 6 | 1 | 2 | 3 | 6 | 7 | −1 | 5 | | 1–1 | 3–1 | 1–2 | — |

Source: Soccerway

=== Group E ===
| Pos | Team | Pld | W | D | L | GF | GA | GD | Pts | Qualification | FIO | DNI | PAC | PAN |
|---|---|---|---|---|---|---|---|---|---|---|---|---|---|---|
| 1 | (Italy) Fiorentina | 6 | 5 | 1 | 0 | 12 | 3 | +9 | 16 | Advance to knockout phase | — | 2–1 | 3–0 | 3–0 |
| 2 | (Ukraine) Dnipro Dnipropetrovsk | 6 | 4 | 0 | 2 | 11 | 5 | +6 | 12 | Advance to knockout phase | 1–2 | — | 2–0 | 4–1 |
| 3 | (Portugal) Paços de Ferreira | 6 | 0 | 3 | 3 | 1 | 8 | −7 | 3 | | 0–0 | 0–2 | — | 1–1 |
| 4 | (Romania) Pandurii Târgu Jiu | 6 | 0 | 2 | 4 | 3 | 11 | −8 | 2 | | 1–2 | 0–1 | 0–0 | — |

Source: Soccerway

=== Group F ===
| Pos | Team | Pld | W | D | L | GF | GA | GD | Pts | Qualification | EIN | MTA | APO | BOR |
|---|---|---|---|---|---|---|---|---|---|---|---|---|---|---|
| 1 | (Germany) Eintracht Frankfurt | 6 | 5 | 0 | 1 | 13 | 4 | +9 | 15 | Advance to knockout phase | — | 2–0 | 2–0 | 3–0 |
| 2 | (Israel) Maccabi Tel Aviv | 6 | 3 | 2 | 1 | 7 | 5 | +2 | 11 | Advance to knockout phase | 4–2 | — | 0–0 | 1–0 |
| 3 | (Cyprus) APOEL | 6 | 1 | 2 | 3 | 3 | 8 | −5 | 5 | | 0–3 | 0–0 | — | 2–1 |
| 4 | (France) Bordeaux | 6 | 1 | 0 | 5 | 4 | 10 | −6 | 3 | | 0–1 | 1–2 | 2–1 | — |

Source: Soccerway

=== Group G ===
| Pos | Team | Pld | W | D | L | GF | GA | GD | Pts | Qualification | GEN | DYN | RAP | THU |
|---|---|---|---|---|---|---|---|---|---|---|---|---|---|---|
| 1 | (Belgium) Genk | 6 | 4 | 2 | 0 | 10 | 5 | +5 | 14 | Advance to knockout phase | — | 3–1 | 1–1 | 2–1 |
| 2 | (Ukraine) Dynamo Kyiv | 6 | 3 | 1 | 2 | 11 | 7 | +4 | 10 | Advance to knockout phase | 0–1 | — | 3–1 | 3–0 |
| 3 | (Austria) Rapid Wien | 6 | 1 | 3 | 2 | 8 | 10 | −2 | 6 | | 2–2 | 2–2 | — | 2–1 |
| 4 | (Switzerland) Thun | 6 | 1 | 0 | 5 | 3 | 10 | −7 | 3 | | 0–1 | 0–2 | 1–0 | — |

Source: Soccerway

=== Group H ===
| Pos | Team | Pld | W | D | L | GF | GA | GD | Pts | Qualification | SEV | SLO | FRE | EST |
|---|---|---|---|---|---|---|---|---|---|---|---|---|---|---|
| 1 | (Spain) Sevilla | 6 | 3 | 3 | 0 | 9 | 4 | +5 | 12 | Advance to knockout phase | — | 1–1 | 2–0 | 1–1 |
| 2 | (Czech Republic) Slovan Liberec | 6 | 2 | 3 | 1 | 9 | 8 | +1 | 9 | Advance to knockout phase | 1–1 | — | 1–2 | 2–1 |
| 3 | (Germany) SC Freiburg | 6 | 1 | 3 | 2 | 5 | 8 | −3 | 6 | | 0–2 | 2–2 | — | 1–1 |
| 4 | (Portugal) Estoril | 6 | 0 | 3 | 3 | 5 | 8 | −3 | 3 | | 1–2 | 1–2 | 0–0 | — |

Source: Soccerway

=== Group I ===
| Pos | Team | Pld | W | D | L | GF | GA | GD | Pts | Qualification | LYO | BET | VIT | RIJ |
|---|---|---|---|---|---|---|---|---|---|---|---|---|---|---|
| 1 | (France) Lyon | 6 | 3 | 3 | 0 | 6 | 3 | +3 | 12 | Advance to knockout phase | — | 1–0 | 1–1 | 1–0 |
| 2 | (Spain) Real Betis | 6 | 2 | 3 | 1 | 3 | 2 | +1 | 9 | Advance to knockout phase | 0–0 | — | 1–0 | 0–0 |
| 3 | (Portugal) Vitória de Guimarães | 6 | 1 | 2 | 3 | 6 | 5 | +1 | 5 | | 1–2 | 0–1 | — | 4–0 |
| 4 | (Croatia) Rijeka | 6 | 0 | 4 | 2 | 2 | 7 | −5 | 4 | | 1–1 | 1–1 | 0–0 | — |

Source: Soccerway

=== Group J ===
| Pos | Team | Pld | W | D | L | GF | GA | GD | Pts | Qualification | TRA | LAZ | APO | LEG |
|---|---|---|---|---|---|---|---|---|---|---|---|---|---|---|
| 1 | (Turkey) Trabzonspor | 6 | 4 | 2 | 0 | 13 | 6 | +7 | 14 | Advance to knockout phase | — | 3–3 | 4–2 | 2–0 |
| 2 | (Italy) Lazio | 6 | 3 | 3 | 0 | 8 | 4 | +4 | 12 | Advance to knockout phase | 0–0 | — | 2–1 | 1–0 |
| 3 | (Cyprus) Apollon Limassol | 6 | 1 | 1 | 4 | 5 | 10 | −5 | 4 | | 1–2 | 0–0 | — | 0–2 |
| 4 | (Poland) Legia Warsaw | 6 | 1 | 0 | 5 | 2 | 8 | −6 | 3 | | 0–2 | 0–2 | 0–1 | — |

Source: Soccerway

=== Group K ===
| Pos | Team | Pld | W | D | L | GF | GA | GD | Pts | Qualification | TOT | ANZ | SHE | TRO |
|---|---|---|---|---|---|---|---|---|---|---|---|---|---|---|
| 1 | (England) Tottenham Hotspur | 6 | 6 | 0 | 0 | 15 | 2 | +13 | 18 | Advance to knockout phase | — | 4–1 | 2–1 | 3–0 |
| 2 | (Russia) Anzhi Makhachkala | 6 | 2 | 2 | 2 | 4 | 7 | −3 | 8 | Advance to knockout phase | 0–2 | — | 1–1 | 1–0 |
| 3 | (Moldova) Sheriff Tiraspol | 6 | 1 | 3 | 2 | 5 | 6 | −1 | 6 | | 0–2 | 0–0 | — | 2–0 |
| 4 | (Norway) Tromsø | 6 | 0 | 1 | 5 | 1 | 10 | −9 | 1 | | 0–2 | 0–1 | 1–1 | — |

Source: Soccerway

=== Group L ===
| Pos | Team | Pld | W | D | L | GF | GA | GD | Pts | Qualification | AZ | PAO | MHA | SHA |
|---|---|---|---|---|---|---|---|---|---|---|---|---|---|---|
| 1 | (Netherlands) AZ | 6 | 3 | 3 | 0 | 8 | 4 | +4 | 12 (Note: Tied on head-to-head points (2) and head-to-head goal difference (0). Head-to-head away goals: AZ 2, PAOK 1.) | Advance to knockout phase | — | 1–1 | 2–0 | 1–0 |
| 2 | (Greece) PAOK | 6 | 3 | 3 | 0 | 10 | 6 | +4 | 12 | Advance to knockout phase | 2–2 | — | 3–2 | 2–1 |
| 3 | (Israel) Maccabi Haifa | 6 | 1 | 2 | 3 | 6 | 9 | −3 | 5 | | 0–1 | 0–0 | — | 2–1 |
| 4 | (Kazakhstan) Shakhter Karagandy | 6 | 0 | 2 | 4 | 5 | 10 | −5 | 2 | | 1–1 | 0–2 | 2–2 | — |

Source: Soccerway

== Knockout phase ==
In the knockout phase, teams played against each other over two legs on a home-and-away basis, except for the one-match final. The mechanism of the draws for each round was as follows:

- In the draw for the round of 32, the twelve group winners and the four third-placed teams from the Champions League group stage with the better group records were seeded, and the twelve group runners-up and the other four third-placed teams from the Champions League group stage were unseeded. The seeded teams were drawn against the unseeded teams, with the seeded teams hosting the second leg. Teams from the same group or the same association could not be drawn against each other.
- In the draws for the round of 16 onwards, there were no seedings, and teams from the same group or the same association could be drawn against each other.

=== Bracket ===
Round of 32
(Portugal) Porto (a) | 2 | 3 | 5
(Germany) Eintracht Frankfurt | 2 | 3 | 5
(England) Swansea City | 0 | 1 | 1
(Italy) Napoli | 0 | 3 | 3
(Slovenia) Maribor | 2 | 1 | 3
(Spain) Sevilla | 2 | 2 | 4
(Spain) Real Betis | 1 | 2 | 3
(Russia) Rubin Kazan | 1 | 0 | 1
(Israel) Maccabi Tel Aviv | 0 | 0 | 0
(Switzerland) Basel | 0 | 3 | 3
(Netherlands) Ajax | 0 | 1 | 1
(Austria) Red Bull Salzburg | 3 | 3 | 6
(Italy) Lazio | 0 | 3 | 3
(Bulgaria) Ludogorets Razgrad | 1 | 3 | 4
(Ukraine) Dynamo Kyiv | 0 | 0 | 0
(Spain) Valencia | 2 | 0 | 2
(Czech Republic) Slovan Liberec | 0 | 1 | 1
(Netherlands) AZ | 1 | 1 | 2
(Russia) Anzhi Makhachkala | 0 | 2 | 2
(Belgium) Genk | 0 | 0 | 0
(Ukraine) Dnipro Dnipropetrovsk | 1 | 1 | 2
(England) Tottenham Hotspur | 0 | 3 | 3
(Greece) PAOK | 0 | 0 | 0
(Portugal) Benfica | 1 | 3 | 4
(Ukraine) Chornomorets Odesa | 0 | 0 | 0
(France) Lyon | 0 | 1 | 1
(Czech Republic) Viktoria Plzeň | 1 | 2 | 3
(Ukraine) Shakhtar Donetsk | 1 | 1 | 2
(Italy) Juventus | 2 | 2 | 4
(Turkey) Trabzonspor | 0 | 0 | 0
(Denmark) Esbjerg | 1 | 1 | 2
(Italy) Fiorentina | 3 | 1 | 4

Round of 16
(Portugal) Porto | 1 | 2 | 3
(Italy) Napoli | 0 | 2 | 2
(Spain) Sevilla (p) | 0 | 2 | 2 (4)
(Spain) Real Betis | 2 | 0 | 2 (3)
(Switzerland) Basel | 0 | 2 | 2
(Austria) Red Bull Salzburg | 0 | 1 | 1
(Bulgaria) Ludogorets Razgrad | 0 | 0 | 0
(Spain) Valencia | 3 | 1 | 4
(Netherlands) AZ | 1 | 0 | 1
(Russia) Anzhi Makhachkala | 0 | 0 | 0
(England) Tottenham Hotspur | 1 | 2 | 3
(Portugal) Benfica | 3 | 2 | 5
(France) Lyon | 4 | 1 | 5
(Czech Republic) Viktoria Plzeň | 1 | 2 | 3
(Italy) Juventus | 1 | 1 | 2
(Italy) Fiorentina | 1 | 0 | 1

Quarter-finals
(Portugal) Porto | 1 | 1 | 2
(Spain) Sevilla | 0 | 4 | 4
(Switzerland) Basel | 3 | 0 | 3
(Spain) Valencia (a.e.t.) | 0 | 5 | 5
(Netherlands) AZ | 0 | 0 | 0
(Portugal) Benfica | 1 | 2 | 3
(France) Lyon | 0 | 1 | 1
(Italy) Juventus | 1 | 2 | 3

Semi-finals
(Spain) Sevilla (a) | 2 | 1 | 3
(Spain) Valencia | 0 | 3 | 3
(Portugal) Benfica | 2 | 0 | 2
(Italy) Juventus | 1 | 0 | 1

Final
14 May – Turin
(Spain) Sevilla (p) | 0 (4)
(Portugal) Benfica | 0 (2)

=== Round of 32 ===
The draw for the round of 32 was held on 16 December 2013. The first legs were played on 20 February, and the second legs were played on 27 February 2014.

| Team 1 | Agg. | Team 2 | 1st leg | 2nd leg |
|---|---|---|---|---|
| Dnipro Dnipropetrovsk (Ukraine) | 2–3 | (England) Tottenham Hotspur | 1–0 | 1–3 |
| Real Betis (Spain) | 3–1 | (Russia) Rubin Kazan | 1–1 | 2–0 |
| Swansea City (England) | 1–3 | (Italy) Napoli | 0–0 | 1–3 |
| Juventus (Italy) | 4–0 | (Turkey) Trabzonspor | 2–0 | 2–0 |
| Maribor (Slovenia) | 3–4 | (Spain) Sevilla | 2–2 | 1–2 |
| Viktoria Plzeň (Czech Republic) | 3–2 | (Ukraine) Shakhtar Donetsk | 1–1 | 2–1 |
| Chornomorets Odesa (Ukraine) | 0–1 | (France) Lyon | 0–0 | 0–1 |
| Lazio (Italy) | 3–4 | (Bulgaria) Ludogorets Razgrad | 0–1 | 3–3 |
| Esbjerg (Denmark) | 2–4 | (Italy) Fiorentina | 1–3 | 1–1 |
| Ajax (Netherlands) | 1–6 | (Austria) Red Bull Salzburg | 0–3 | 1–3 |
| Maccabi Tel Aviv (Israel) | 0–3 | (Switzerland) Basel | 0–0 | 0–3 |
| Porto (Portugal) | 5–5 (a) | (Germany) Eintracht Frankfurt | 2–2 | 3–3 |
| Anzhi Makhachkala (Russia) | 2–0 | (Belgium) Genk | 0–0 | 2–0 |
| Dynamo Kyiv (Ukraine) | 0–2 | (Spain) Valencia | 0–2 | 0–0 |
| PAOK (Greece) | 0–4 | (Portugal) Benfica | 0–1 | 0–3 |
| Slovan Liberec (Czech Republic) | 1–2 | (Netherlands) AZ | 0–1 | 1–1 |

=== Round of 16 ===
The draw for the round of 16 was held on 16 December 2013, immediately after the round of 32 draw. The first legs were played on 13 March, and the second legs were played on 20 March 2014.

| Team 1 | Agg. | Team 2 | 1st leg | 2nd leg |
|---|---|---|---|---|
| AZ (Netherlands) | 1–0 | (Russia) Anzhi Makhachkala | 1–0 | 0–0 |
| Ludogorets Razgrad (Bulgaria) | 0–4 | (Spain) Valencia | 0–3 | 0–1 |
| Porto (Portugal) | 3–2 | (Italy) Napoli | 1–0 | 2–2 |
| Lyon (France) | 5–3 | (Czech Republic) Viktoria Plzeň | 4–1 | 1–2 |
| Sevilla (Spain) | 2–2 (4–3 p) | (Spain) Real Betis | 0–2 | 2–0 (a.e.t.) |
| Tottenham Hotspur (England) | 3–5 | (Portugal) Benfica | 1–3 | 2–2 |
| Basel (Switzerland) | 2–1 | (Austria) Red Bull Salzburg | 0–0 | 2–1 |
| Juventus (Italy) | 2–1 | (Italy) Fiorentina | 1–1 | 1–0 |

=== Quarter-finals ===
The draw for the quarter-finals was held on 21 March 2014. The first legs were played on 3 April, and the second legs were played on 10 April 2014.

| Team 1 | Agg. | Team 2 | 1st leg | 2nd leg |
|---|---|---|---|---|
| AZ (Netherlands) | 0–3 | (Portugal) Benfica | 0–1 | 0–2 |
| Lyon (France) | 1–3 | (Italy) Juventus | 0–1 | 1–2 |
| Basel (Switzerland) | 3–5 | (Spain) Valencia | 3–0 | 0–5 (a.e.t.) |
| Porto (Portugal) | 2–4 | (Spain) Sevilla | 1–0 | 1–4 |

=== Semi-finals ===
The draw for the semi-finals was held on 11 April 2014. The first legs were played on 24 April, and the second legs were played on 1 May 2014.

| Team 1 | Agg. | Team 2 | 1st leg | 2nd leg |
|---|---|---|---|---|
| Sevilla (Spain) | 3–3 (a) | (Spain) Valencia | 2–0 | 1–3 |
| Benfica (Portugal) | 2–1 | (Italy) Juventus | 2–1 | 0–0 |

=== Final ===
The final was played on 14 May 2014 at Juventus Stadium in Turin, Italy. A draw was held on 11 April 2014, after the semi-final draw, to determine the "home" team for administrative purposes.

14 May 2014
20:45 UTC+2

| Sevilla (Spain) | 0–0 (a.e.t.) | (Portugal) Benfica |
|---|---|---|
| | Report |
Penalties
| Bacca (penalty scored); Mbia (penalty scored); Coke (penalty scored); Gameiro (penalty scored) | 4–2 | (penalty scored) Lima; (penalty missed) Cardozo; (penalty missed) Rodrigo; (penalty scored) Luisão |

Juventus Stadium, Turin
Attendance: 33,120
Referee: Felix Brych (Germany)

== Statistics ==
Statistics exclude qualifying rounds and play-off round.

=== Top goalscorers ===
| Rank | Player | Team | Goals | Minutes played |
|---|---|---|---|---|
| 1 | (Spain) Jonathan Soriano | (Austria) Red Bull Salzburg | 8 | 565 |
| 2 | (Spain) Paco Alcácer | (Spain) Valencia | 7 | 716 |
| 3 | (Slovenia) Roman Bezjak | (Bulgaria) Ludogorets Razgrad | 6 | 576 |
| 4 | (England) Jermain Defoe | (England) Tottenham Hotspur | 5 | 360 |
| 4 | (France) Kevin Gameiro | (Spain) Sevilla | 5 | 646 |
| 4 | (Turkey) Olcan Adın | (Turkey) Trabzonspor | 5 | 720 |
| 7 | (Germany) Alexander Meier | (Germany) Eintracht Frankfurt | 4 | 348 |
| 7 | (Italy) Sergio Floccari | (Italy) Lazio | 4 | 382 |
| 7 | (Brazil) Lima | (Portugal) Benfica | 4 | 401 |
| 7 | (United States) Terrence Boyd | (Austria) Rapid Wien | 4 | 477 |
| 7 | (Ukraine) Andriy Yarmolenko | (Ukraine) Dynamo Kyiv | 4 | 610 |
| 7 | (Ukraine) Yevhen Konoplyanka | (Ukraine) Dnipro Dnipropetrovsk | 4 | 625 |
| 7 | (Brazil) Alan | (Austria) Red Bull Salzburg | 4 | 682 |
| 7 | (Senegal) Sadio Mané | (Austria) Red Bull Salzburg | 4 | 712 |
| 7 | (Colombia) Carlos Bacca | (Spain) Sevilla | 4 | 897 |

=== Top assists ===
| Rank | Player | Team | Assists | Minutes played |
|---|---|---|---|---|
| 1 | (Israel) Bibras Natcho | (Russia) Rubin Kazan | 5 | 450 |
| 1 | (Slovenia) Kevin Kampl | (Austria) Red Bull Salzburg | 5 | 768 |
| 3 | (Denmark) Christian Eriksen | (England) Tottenham Hotspur | 4 | 454 |
| 3 | (Tunisia) Fabien Camus | (Belgium) Genk | 4 | 462 |
| 3 | (Switzerland) Tranquillo Barnetta | (Germany) Eintracht Frankfurt | 4 | 497 |
| 3 | (Brazil) Alan | (Austria) Red Bull Salzburg | 4 | 682 |

=== Squad of the season ===
The UEFA technical study group selected the following 18 players as the squad of the tournament:

| Pos. | Player | Team |
|---|---|---|
| GK | (Portugal) Beto | (Spain) Sevilla |
| GK | (Italy) Gianluigi Buffon | (Italy) Juventus |
| DF | (France) Eliaquim Mangala | (Portugal) Porto |
| DF | (Argentina) Ezequiel Garay | (Portugal) Benfica |
| DF | (Italy) Leonardo Bonucci | (Italy) Juventus |
| DF | (Argentina) Nicolás Pareja | (Spain) Sevilla |
| DF | (Argentina) Gonzalo Rodríguez | (Italy) Fiorentina |
| MF | (Italy) Andrea Pirlo | (Italy) Juventus |
| MF | (Spain) Borja Valero | (Italy) Fiorentina |
| MF | (Croatia) Ivan Rakitić | (Spain) Sevilla |
| MF | (Cameroon) Stéphane Mbia | (Spain) Sevilla |
| MF | (Argentina) Nicolás Gaitán | (Portugal) Benfica |
| MF | (Portugal) André Gomes | (Portugal) Benfica |
| FW | (Argentina) Carlos Tevez | (Italy) Juventus |
| FW | (Argentina) Gonzalo Higuaín | (Italy) Napoli |
| FW | (Spain) Jonathan Soriano | (Austria) Red Bull Salzburg |
| FW | (Spain) Rodrigo | (Portugal) Benfica |
| FW | (Serbia) Lazar Marković | (Portugal) Benfica |

== See also ==
- 2013–14 UEFA Champions League
- 2014 UEFA Super Cup
