= Wang Chu =

Chinese footballer (born 1991)

Wang Chu 王楚
Personal information
- Full name: Wang Chu
- Date of birth: 10 January 1991 (age 35)
- Place of birth: Chengdu, Sichuan, China
- Height: 1.78 m (5 ft 10 in)
- Position: Midfielder

Youth career
- 2004–2010: Metz

Senior career*
Years	Team	Apps	(Gls)
2010–2012	Metz B	29	(2)
2012–2014	Jeunesse Esch	37	(4)
2016–2019	Cova da Piedade	4	(0)
2018	→ Beijing Renhe (loan)	12	(0)
2019–2022	Sichuan Jiuniu	90	(11)
2023	Chengdu Rongcheng	0	(0)
2024	Shenzhen Peng City	0	(0)
- * Club domestic league appearances and goals as of 31 December 2020

Wang Chu (Chinese: 王楚; pinyin: Wáng Chǔ; born 10 January 1991) is a Chinese former professional footballer who played as a midfielder.

== Club career ==
Wang Chu started his football career when he joined Metz's youth academy in 2004 as a part of a cooperation between Metz and the Chengdu Football Association. He was promoted to Metz reserve to play in Championnat de France Amateur in 2010. In June 2012, he terminated his contract with Metz after the club refused to promote him to the first team.

Wang signed a two-year contract with Luxembourg National Division side Jeunesse Esch in the summer of 2012. He won Luxembourg Cup with the club in the 2012–13 season. On 4 July 2013, he scored a goal in the first leg of the first qualifying round of 2013–14 UEFA Europa League in a 2–0 home victory against Finnish club TPS. He scored again in the second leg on 9 July 2013, which ensured Jeunesse Esch win 3–2 on aggregate and advance to the next round. He didn't extend his contract at the end of the 2013–14 season due to serious injury.

On 17 June 2016, Wang signed a one-year contract with Cova da Piedade which newly earned promotion to LigaPro. He made his debut in Portugal on 20 August 2016 in 1–0 away victory against Braga B, coming on as a substitute for Robson in the 84th minute. On 18 July 2017, he extended his contract with the club for another season.

Wang was loaned to Chinese Super League newcomer Beijing Renhe on 25 February 2018. In February 2019, Wang Chu joined China League Two side Sichuan Jiuniu.

== Career statistics ==
As of 31 December 2020.

Appearances and goals by club, season and competition
Club	Season	League			National Cup		League Cup		Continental		Total	
Club	Season	Division	Apps	Goals	Apps	Goals	Apps	Goals	Apps	Goals	Apps	Goals
Metz B	2010–11	CFA	14	1	0	0	-		-		14	1
Metz B	2011–12	CFA	15	1	0	0	-		-		15	1
Metz B	Total		29	2	0	0	0	0	0	0	29	2
Jeunesse Esch	2012–13	Luxembourg National Division	23	2	1	0	-		0	0	24	2
Jeunesse Esch	2013–14	Luxembourg National Division	14	2	2	0	-		4	2	20	4
Jeunesse Esch	Total		37	4	3	0	0	0	4	2	44	6
Cova da Piedade	2016–17	LigaPro	2	0	0	0	0	0	-		2	0
Cova da Piedade	2017–18	LigaPro	2	0	4	0	1	0	-		7	0
Cova da Piedade	Total		4	0	4	0	1	0	0	0	9	0
Beijing Renhe	2018	Chinese Super League	12	0	2	2	-		-		14	2
Sichuan Jiuniu	2019	China League Two	24	6	3	0	-		-		27	6
Sichuan Jiuniu	2020	China League One	13	1	-		-		-		13	1
Sichuan Jiuniu	Total		37	7	3	0	0	0	0	0	40	7
Career total			119	13	12	2	1	0	4	2	136	17

== Honours ==
=== Club ===
Jeunesse Esch

- Luxembourg Cup: 2012-13
