= Simonas Paulius =

Lithuanian footballer

Personal information
- Full name: Simonas Paulius
- Date of birth: 12 May 1991 (age 35)
- Place of birth: Kretinga, Lithuania
- Height: 1.82 m (6 ft 0 in)
- Position: Midfielder

Senior career*
Years	Team	Apps	(Gls)
2009–2012	Kaunas	52	(7)
2012	Dainava Alytus	15	(0)
2012–2017	Ventspils	138	(12)
2018	Kauno Žalgiris	18	(1)
2018–2019	Widzew Łódź	9	(0)
2020	Kauno Žalgiris	13	(1)
2021–2024	Šiauliai	111	(1)
2025	FK Tauras Tauragė	23	(0)
2026	FC Neptūnas	?	(?)

International career
2011–2012	Lithuania U21	7	(1)
2016–2018	Lithuania	10	(0)
- * Club domestic league appearances and goals as of 20 July 2026

Simonas Paulius (born 12 May 1991) is a Lithuanian former professional footballer who played as a midfielder.

== Club career ==
On 1 July 2012, Paulius moved to Ventspils. In 2018, he played for Kauno Žalgiris in the first half of season, before moving to Polish club Widzew Łódź.

== International career ==
In May 2016, Paulius made his debut for the Lithuania national team against Estonia.

== Honours ==
Ventspils

- Latvian Higher League: 2013, 2014
- Latvian Cup: 2012–13, 2017
