= Ross Stephens =

Welsh footballer (born 1985)

Personal information
- Date of birth: 28 May 1985 (age 41)
- Place of birth: Llanidloes, Wales
- Position: Midfielder

Senior career*
Years	Team	Apps	(Gls)
2002–2005	Shrewsbury Town	3	(0)
2002–2003	→ Caersws (loan)	12	(3)
2005–2007	Caersws	45	(15)
2007	Rhyl	10	(1)
2007–2009	Welshpool Town	16	(5)
2009	Aberystwyth Town	15	(5)
2009–2010	Newtown	33	(11)
2010–2015	Prestatyn Town	125	(29)
2015–2016	Aberystwyth Town	34	(5)
2016–2017	Newtown	19	(2)
2017	Caersws		
2017–2018	Prestatyn Town	17	(0)
2018–2019	Caernarfon Town	8	(0)
2019–2020	Rhyl		
2021	Llanidloes Town		
- * Club domestic league appearances and goals

Ross Stephens (born 28 May 1985) is a Welsh retired footballer.

== Career ==
Stephens rejoined Aberystwyth Town F.C. in January 2015 from Prestatyn Town, and made an instant impact scoring a Goal of the Month Contender against Newtown A.F.C. with a stunning left-footed volley in his first game back at the club. He made 7 Welsh Premier League Appearances for Aberystwyth in the 2014/15 season scoring twice and setting up two goals in the UEFA Europa League Play Off Semi Finals win over Connah's Quay Nomads F.C., and also played in the Final against Newtown. Ross received national publicity that week as the Final took place the day after his wedding, at which his Best Man was Aberystwyth teammate Chris Venables.

30 year old Ross had joined Prestatyn from Newtown in June 2010, making the Seasiders his sixth Welsh Premier League club at the age of 25, and he enjoyed a successful time at Bastion Gardens including a Welsh Cup Final victory in 2013 and a four-game UEFA Europa League run a few months later. He joined Newtown in the summer of 2009 after leaving Aber, having made 13 (+3) appearances for the Seasiders. Stephens scored a creditable five goals in his first spell in Black and Green, but was cup-tied for Aber's Welsh Cup run, which affected his chances at Park Avenue. Stephens had joined Aber in January 2009 after a successful spell at Welshpool Town F.C., having joined in 2007 after playing 14 matches and scoring 1 goal for Rhyl. He became John Hulse's first signing of 2007 when he joined the Lilywhites from Caersws F.C. in January after a number of excellent performances for the Bluebirds. Ross, signed permanently for Micky Evans' Caersws in June 2005, after a loan spell at the Recreation Ground in 2003. The Llanidloes-born player was released by Shrewsbury at the end of the 2004/05 season after a loan period at Redditch United. He is a talented player with excellent passing and dribbling ability and also has a strong eye for goal. Ross has carved out an excellent reputation in the WPL, having scored 78 goals in 309 appearances
