= Ville Nikkari =

Finnish footballer (born 1988)

Personal information
- Date of birth: 5 November 1988 (age 37)
- Place of birth: Turku, Finland
- Height: 1.77 m (5 ft 9 1/2 in)
- Position: Defender

Senior career*
Years	Team	Apps	(Gls)
2006–2014	Inter Turku	169	(1)

International career
2008–2010	Finland U-21	13	(0)
- * Club domestic league appearances and goals

Ville Nikkari (born 5 November 1988) is a Finnish former professional footballer.
