= Dejan Damjanović (footballer, born 1986) =

Montenegrin footballer

Personal information
- Full name: Dejan Damjanović
- Date of birth: 8 July 1986 (age 40)
- Place of birth: Pljevlja, SFR Yugoslavia
- Position: Defender

Senior career*
Years	Team	Apps	(Gls)
2004–2008	Rudar Pljevlja	52+	(2+)
2007–2009	Kom	29	(0)
2009–2010	Napredak Kruševac	2	(0)
2010	Rudar Pljevlja	2	(0)
2011–2012	OFK Bar	27	(1)
2012–2013	Rudar Pljevlja	21	(0)
2013–2014	Lovćen	8	(0)
2014–2016	Rudar Pljevlja	29	(1)
- * Club domestic league appearances and goals

Dejan Damjanović (Cyrillic: Дејан Дамјановић; born 8 July 1986) is a Montenegrin former footballer.

He had previously played with Serbian SuperLiga club FK Napredak Kruševac and OFK Bar in the Montenegrin Second League.

== Honours ==
Lovćen

- Montenegrin Cup: 2014
