= Federico Piovaccari =

Italian footballer (born 1984)

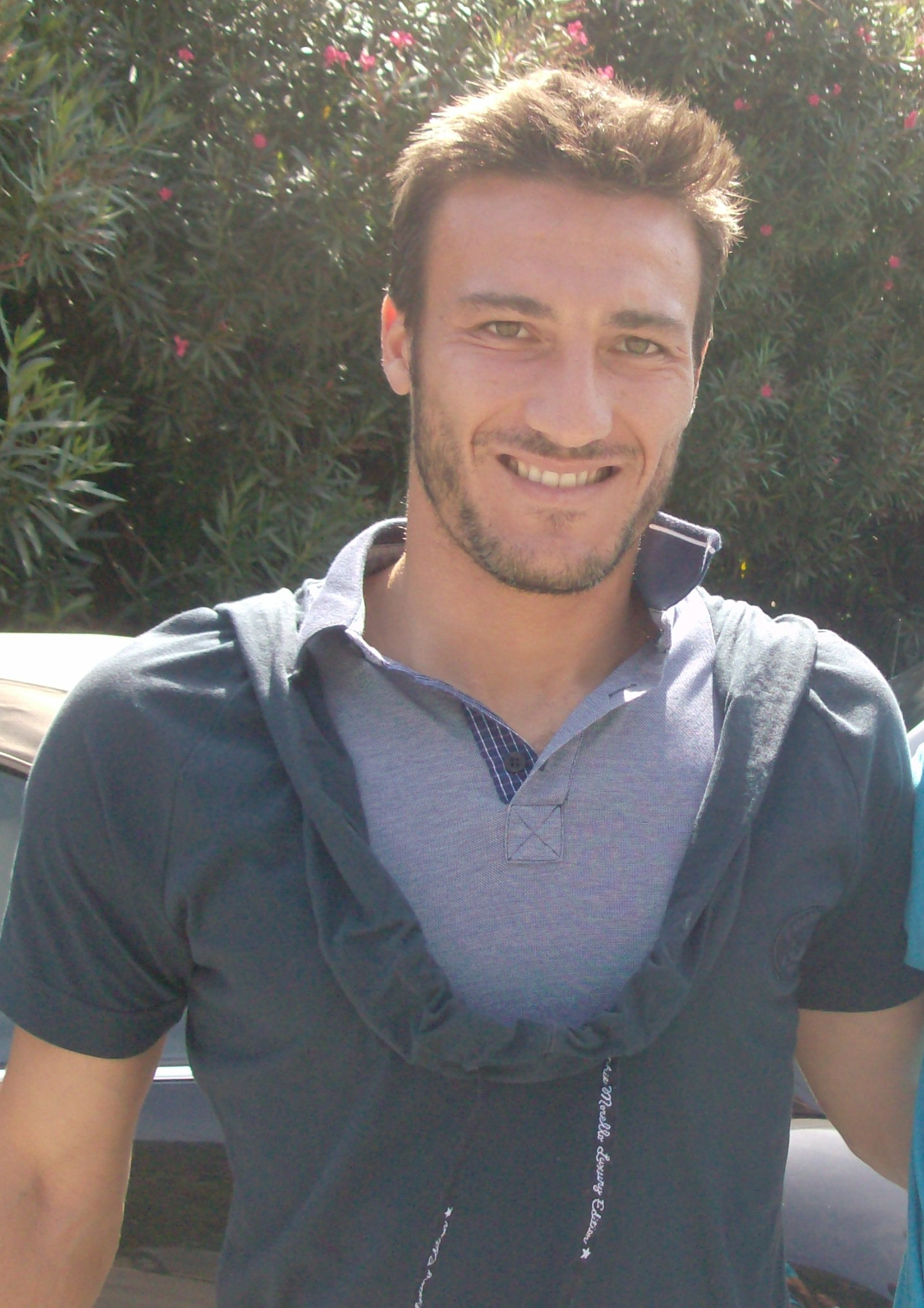
- Piovaccari in 2011

Personal information
- Date of birth: 1 September 1984 (age 42)
- Place of birth: Gallarate, Italy
- Height: 1.81 m (5 ft 11 in)
- Position: Forward

Youth career
- –2002: Pro Patria
- 2003–2004: Inter Milan

Senior career*
Years	Team	Apps	(Gls)
2002–2003	Pro Patria	0	(0)
2002–2003	Castellettese	17	(6)
2004–2007	Inter Milan	0	(0)
2004–2005	→ Vittoria (loan)	25	(10)
2005–2006	→ San Marino (loan)	29	(11)
2006–2007	→ Triestina (loan)	37	(5)
2007–2009	Treviso	40	(4)
2009–2010	Ravenna	34	(14)
2010–2011	Cittadella	39	(23)
2011–2015	Sampdoria	17	(2)
2012	→ Brescia (loan)	17	(4)
2012	→ Novara (loan)	10	(0)
2013	→ Grosseto (loan)	17	(7)
2013–2014	→ Steaua București (loan)	25	(10)
2014–2015	→ Eibar (loan)	28	(6)
2015–2016	Western Sydney Wanderers	12	(2)
2016–2017	Córdoba	28	(4)
2017	Zhejiang Yiteng	14	(7)
2018	Ternana	19	(0)
2018–2019	Córdoba	35	(12)
2019–2020	Rayo Vallecano	13	(0)
2020–2021	Córdoba	23	(5)
2021–2022	Paganese	16	(4)
2022	ACR Messina	11	(2)
2022–2023	Giugliano	31	(5)
2023–2024	Cavese	7	(1)
2024	San Cristóbal	14	(2)
2024–2025	Virtus	6	(1)
Total		564	(147)

International career
2005	Italy U-23	2	(0)
- * Club domestic league appearances and goals

Federico Piovaccari (Italian pronunciation: [fedeˈriːko pjovakˈkaːri]; born 1 September 1984) is an Italian former professional footballer who played as a forward.

== Club career ==
=== Early career ===
Born in Gallarate, Piovaccari graduated from Pro Patria's youth setup, and made his debuts while on loan at Serie D side Castellettese. In the summer of 2003, he joined Internazionale, being assigned to the Primavera squad.

In 2004, Piovaccari was loaned to Vittoria, and scored ten goals for the club in Serie C1. In July 2005, he was loaned to Treviso of Serie B, but after the latter's promotion to Serie A due to Caso Genoa, he moved to San Marino Calcio in the third level, also in a temporary deal.

=== Treviso; Ravenna ===
After a loan spell at second-tier Triestina, Piovaccari returned to Treviso, now in a co-ownership deal. In July 2009, the free agent signed a two-year deal with Lega Pro Prima Divisione side Ravenna after Treviso's bankruptcy, as a replacement to Pescara-bound Francesco Zizzari.

Piovaccari scored in his debut for the club on 3 August 2009, netting the winner of a 3–2 win against Giulianova, in that season's Coppa Italia. He was the team top-scorer in the campaign, scoring 14 goals and appearing in 30 matches in the league, as the Giallorossi narrowly avoided relegation.

=== Cittadella ===
Piovaccari moved to Cittadella, also in the second level, on 31 August 2010 in a co-ownership deal for €120,000, while Paolo Rossi moved in the opposite direction. The club sold its flagship striker for the second successive year (Riccardo Meggiorini in 2010 and Matteo Ardemagni in 2011). Piovaccari was also top goalscorer in the 2010–11 campaign, scoring 23 league goals.

On 24 June 2011, Cittadella bought Piovaccari's remaining registration rights for €880,000.

=== Sampdoria ===
On 8 July 2011, Piovaccari moved to another Serie B side, Sampdoria, for €3.5 million in a four-year contract. After appearing sparingly, he moved to Brescia on 31 January 2012, on loan until June (along with Salvatore Foti) and with Juan Antonio and Andrea Magrassi moving in the opposite direction. During the 2012 financial year, Piovaccari also signed a new contract which last until 30 June 2016.

After returning to Sampdoria, Piovaccari was loaned out again to Novara, and subsequently served another temporary deal at Grosseto, featuring regularly with the latter.

==== Steaua Bucharest (FCSB) (loan) ====
In July 2013, Piovaccari was loaned to Romanian club FCSB in a season-long deal. He made his debut in the Romanian Supercup in a 3–0 win over Petrolul Ploiești, coming on as a substitute for Stefan Nikolić.

On 24 July, Piovaccari scored his first goal for FCSB, in a 2–1 second leg win against Vardar Skopje in the campaign's UEFA Champions League qualifiers. He scored 16 goals during the campaign, winning the Liga I and the Supercupa României.

==== Eibar (loan) ====
On 19 August 2014, Piovaccari was loaned to Spanish side Eibar, newly promoted to La Liga. He made his debut for the club on 24 August, replacing Ander Capa in the dying minutes of a 1–0 home win against Real Sociedad. On 1 July 2015, Piovaccari was released by Sampdoria.

=== Later years ===
On 27 July 2015, Piovaccari was unveiled as the marquee of Australian club Western Sydney Wanderers' 2015–16 A-League campaign. He was released by the club on 5 May 2016.

On 17 August 2016, Piovaccari signed a one-year contract with Spanish Segunda División side Córdoba. On 5 July 2017, it was reported that Piovaccari joined Chinese club Zhejiang Yiteng.

On 10 January 2018, Serie B club Ternana announced the signing of Piovaccari on a 6-month contract, with option to extent to further season. On 16 August 2018, Piovaccari returned to Córdoba after agreeing to a one-year contract.

On 15 July 2019, Piovaccari signed a one-year contract with fellow second division side Rayo Vallecano.

On 26 August 2021, he returned to Italy and signed with Paganese in Serie C. On 31 January 2022, his contract was terminated by mutual consent. On the next day, Piovaccari signed with ACR Messina.

== International career ==
In 2005, Piovaccari played for Italy U23 on 2005 Mediterranean Games.

== Career statistics ==
As of match played 24 May 2025

Appearances and goals by club, season and competition
Club	Season	League			Cup		Other		Total	
Club	Season	Division	Apps	Goals	Apps	Goals	Apps	Goals	Apps	Goals
Castellettese (loan)	2002–03	Serie D	17	6	0	0	—		17	6
Vittoria (loan)	2004–05	Serie C1	25	10	0	0	2 (Note: Appearances in Serie C1-Relegation play-outs)	1	27	11
San Marino (loan)	2005–06	Serie C1	29	11	0	0	2	1	31	12
Triestina (loan)	2006–07	Serie B	37	5	3	0	—		40	5
Treviso	2007–08	Serie B	22	3	1	0	—		23	3
Treviso	2008–09	Serie B	18	1	0	0	—		18	1
Treviso	Total		40	4	1	0	—		41	4
Ravenna	2009–10	Lega Pro Prima Divisione	32	13	2	1	—		34	14
Ravenna	2010–11	Lega Pro Prima Divisione	2	1	2	0	—		4	1
Ravenna	Total		34	14	4	1	—		38	15
Cittadella	2010–11	Serie B	39	23	—		—		39	23
Sampdoria	2011–12	Serie B	17	2	1	0	—		18	2
Brescia (loan)	2011–12	Serie B	17	4	—		—		17	4
Novara (loan)	2012–13	Serie B	10	0	2	1	—		12	1
Grosseto (loan)	2012–13	Serie B	17	7	—		—		17	7
Steaua București (loan)	2013–14	Liga I	25	10	5	2	13 (Note: Twelve appearances and four goals in UEFA Champions League, one appearance in Supercupa României)	4	43	16
Eibar (loan)	2014–15	La Liga	28	6	2	1	—		30	7
Western Sydney Wanderers	2015–16	A-League	12	2	2	0	0	0	14	2
Córdoba	2016–17	Segunda División	28	4	5	4	—		33	8
Zhejiang Yiteng	2017	China League One	14	7	0	0	—		14	7
Ternana	2017–18	Serie B	19	0	—		—		19	0
Córdoba	2018–19	Segunda División	35	12	2	1	—		37	13
Rayo Vallecano	2019–20	Segunda División	13	0	2	1	—		15	1
Córdoba	2019–20	Segunda División B	6	1	—		—		6	1
Córdoba	2020–21	Segunda División B	17	4	3	0	3 (Note: Appearances in Segunda División B–Promotion play-offs)	0	23	4
Córdoba	Total		23	5	3	0	3	0	29	5
Paganese	2021–22	Serie C	16	4	0	0	—		16	4
Messina	2021–22	Serie C	11	2	—		—		11	2
Giugliano	2022–23	Serie C	31	5	0	0	—		31	5
Cavese	2023–24	Serie D	7	1	1	0	—		8	1
San Cristóbal	2023–24	Tercera Federación	14	2	—		—		14	2
Virtus	2024–25	Campionato Sammarinese	6	1	2	0	3 (Note: Two appearances in UEFA Champions League, one appearance in Super Coppa Sammarinese)	0	11	1
Career total			564	147	35	11	23	6	622	164

== Honours ==
Steaua București

- Liga I: 2013–14
- Supercupa Romaniei: 2013

Virtus

- Campionato Sammarinese di Calcio: 2024–25
- Coppa Titano: 2024–25
- Super Coppa Sammarinese: 2024

Individual

- Serie B top scorer: 2010–11 (23 goals)
- Lega Pro Prima Divisione (group B) top scorer: 2009–1- (14 goals)
