= 2013–14 UEFA Champions League qualifying =

European football tournament

2013–14 UEFA Champions League qualifying was the preliminary phase of the 2013–14 UEFA Champions League, prior to the competition proper. Qualification consisted of the qualifying phase (first to third rounds) and the play-off round. It was played from 2 July to 28 August 2013, deciding 10 of the 32 places in the group stage.

All times were CEST (UTC+2).

== Round and draw dates ==
All draws were held at UEFA headquarters in Nyon, Switzerland.

Round	Draw date and time	First leg	Second leg
First qualifying round	24 June 2013, 12:00	2–3 July 2013	9–10 July 2013
Second qualifying round	24 June 2013, 12:00	16–17 July 2013	23–24 July 2013
Third qualifying round	19 July 2013, 12:00	30–31 July 2013	6–7 August 2013
Play-off round	9 August 2013, 11:45	20–21 August 2013	27–28 August 2013

== Format ==
In the qualifying phase and play-off round, each tie was played over two legs, with each team playing one leg at home. The team that scored more goals on aggregate over the two legs advanced to the next round. If the aggregate score was level, the away goals rule was applied, i.e., the team that scored more goals away from home over the two legs advanced. If away goals were also equal, then thirty minutes of extra time was played. The away goals rule was again applied after extra time, i.e., if there were goals scored during extra time and the aggregate score was still level, the visiting team advanced by virtue of more away goals scored. If no goals were scored during extra time, the tie was decided by penalty shoot-out.

In the draws for each round, teams were seeded based on their UEFA club coefficients at the beginning of the season, with the teams divided into seeded and unseeded pots. A seeded team was drawn against an unseeded team, with the order of legs in each tie decided randomly. Due to the limited time between matches, the draws for the second and third qualifying rounds took place before the results of the previous round were known. For these draws (or in any cases where the result of a tie in the previous round was not known at the time of the draw), the seeding was carried out under the assumption that the team with the higher coefficient of an undecided tie advanced to this round, which means if the team with the lower coefficient was to advance, it simply took the seeding of its defeated opponent. Prior to the draws, UEFA may form "groups" in accordance with the principles set by the Club Competitions Committee, but they were purely for convenience of the draw and for ensuring that teams from the same association were not drawn against each other, and did not resemble any real groupings in the sense of the competition.

== Teams ==
There were two routes which the teams were separated into during qualifying:

- Champions Route, which included all domestic champions which did not automatically qualify for the group stage.
- League Route (also called the Non-champions Path or the Best-placed Path), which included all domestic non-champions which did not automatically qualify for the group stage.

A total of 54 teams (39 in Champions Route, 15 in League Route) were involved in the qualifying phase and play-off round. The 10 winners of the play-off round (5 in Champions Route, 5 in League Route) advanced to the group stage to join the 22 automatic qualifiers. The 15 losers of the third qualifying round entered the Europa League play-off round, and the 10 losers of the play-off round entered the Europa League group stage.

Below were the participating teams (with their 2013 UEFA club coefficients), grouped by their starting rounds.

Key to colours
Winners of the play-off round advanced to the group stage
Losers of the play-off round entered the Europa League group stage
Losers of the third qualifying round entered the Europa League play-off round

=== Champions Route ===
Third qualifying round
Team	Coeff
(Switzerland) Basel	59.785
(Cyprus) APOEL	35.366
Austria Wien	16.575

Second qualifying round
Team	Coeff
(Belarus) BATE Borisov	39.175
(Scotland) Celtic	37.538
(Romania) Steaua București	35.604
(Czech Republic) Viktoria Plzeň	28.745
(Croatia) Dinamo Zagreb	25.916
(Serbia) Partizan	17.425
(Poland) Legia Warsaw	13.650
(Moldova) Sheriff Tiraspol	11.533
(Slovenia) Maribor	9.941
(Slovakia) Slovan Bratislava	8.341
(Sweden) IF Elfsborg	8.125
(Israel) Maccabi Tel Aviv	8.075
(Norway) Molde	7.835
(Finland) HJK	6.701
(Lithuania) Ekranas	6.300
(Azerbaijan) Neftçi	5.708
(Georgia (country)) Dinamo Tbilisi	5.333
(Bosnia and Herzegovina) Željezničar	4.566
(Iceland) FH	4.083
(Hungary) Győri ETO	3.850
(Wales) The New Saints	3.766
(Bulgaria) Ludogorets Razgrad	3.450
(Republic of Ireland) Sligo Rovers	3.225
(Kazakhstan) Shakhter Karagandy	2.941
(Albania) Skënderbeu	2.833
(Malta) Birkirkara	2.541
(Northern Ireland) Cliftonville	2.116
(North Macedonia) Vardar	2.050
(Latvia) Daugava Daugavpils	1.658
(Montenegro) Sutjeska	1.300
(Estonia) Nõmme Kalju	1.191
(Luxembourg) Fola Esch	0.925

First qualifying round
Team	Coeff
(Faroe Islands) EB/Streymur	2.316
(San Marino) Tre Penne	1.383
(Andorra) Lusitanos	1.100
(Armenia) Shirak	0.850

=== League Route ===
Play-off round
Team	Coeff
(England) Arsenal	113.592
(Italy) Milan	93.829
(Germany) Schalke 04	84.922
(Spain) Real Sociedad	17.605
(Portugal) Paços de Ferreira	12.833

Third qualifying round
Team	Coeff
(France) Lyon	95.800
(Russia) Zenit Saint Petersburg	70.766
(Netherlands) PSV Eindhoven	64.945
(Ukraine) Metalist Kharkiv	62.451
(Turkey) Fenerbahçe	46.400
(Greece) PAOK	28.800
(Austria) Red Bull Salzburg	28.075
(Denmark) Nordsjælland	12.640
(Switzerland) Grasshopper	7.285
(Belgium) Zulte Waregem	6.880

Notes

1. ^{†} On 14 August 2013, Metalist Kharkiv were disqualified from the 2013–14 UEFA club competitions because of previous match-fixing. UEFA decided to replace Metalist Kharkiv in the Champions League play-off round with PAOK, who were eliminated by Metalist Kharkiv in the third qualifying round. Metalist Kharkiv made two urgent requests to the Court of Arbitration for Sport for temporary reinstatement until a final decision is reached, but both requests were rejected. On 28 August 2013, the Court of Arbitration for Sport upheld UEFA's ban.
2. ^{‡} On 25 June 2013, Fenerbahçe were banned by UEFA from the 2013–14 UEFA club competitions because of the 2011 Turkish sports corruption scandal. They appealed the ban to the Court of Arbitration for Sport, and on 18 July 2013 it was ruled that the ban should be temporarily lifted and they should be included in the qualifying round draws of the Champions League, until the final decision to be made before the end of August 2013. Fenerbahçe competed in the Champions League qualifying rounds and lost in the play-off round. On 28 August 2013, the Court of Arbitration for Sport upheld UEFA's ban, meaning Fenerbahçe were banned from the 2013–14 UEFA Europa League.

== First qualifying round ==
=== Seeding ===
A total of four teams played in the first qualifying round. The draw was held on 24 June 2013.

Seeded	Unseeded
(Faroe Islands) EB/Streymur (San Marino) Tre Penne	(Andorra) Lusitanos (Armenia) Shirak

=== Summary ===
The first legs were played on 2 July, and the second legs were played on 9 July 2013.

Team 1	Agg.	Team 2	1st leg	2nd leg
Shirak (Armenia)	3–1	(San Marino) Tre Penne	3–0	0–1
Lusitanos (Andorra)	3–7	(Faroe Islands) EB/Streymur	2–2	1–5

=== Matches ===
2 July 2013
15:00

Shirak (Armenia)	3–0	(San Marino) Tre Penne
Fofana 36', 55', 64'	Report

Gyumri City Stadium, Gyumri
Attendance: 2,600
Referee: Alexandr Aliyev (Kazakhstan)
9 July 2013
21:00

Tre Penne (San Marino)	1–0	(Armenia) Shirak
Kyere 2' (o.g.)	Report

Stadio Olimpico, Serravalle
Attendance: 453
Referee: Laurent Kopriwa (Luxembourg)

Shirak won 3–1 on aggregate.

2 July 2013
19:30

Lusitanos (Andorra)	2–2	(Faroe Islands) EB/Streymur
Martínez 24' (pen.), 29'	Report	A. Hansen 67'; Hanssen 69' (pen.)

Estadi Comunal, Andorra la Vella
Attendance: 750
Referee: Damir Batinić (Croatia)
9 July 2013
20:00

EB/Streymur (Faroe Islands)	5–1	(Andorra) Lusitanos
A. Hansen 3'; Hanssen 38', 85'; Zachariasen 72'; Niclasen 90+3'	Report	Dos Reis 66'

Tórsvøllur, Tórshavn (Note: EB/Streymur played their home matches at Tórsvøllur, Tórshavn, instead of their regular stadium Við Margáir, Streymnes.)
Attendance: 1,200
Referee: Raymond Crangle (Northern Ireland)

EB/Streymur won 7–3 on aggregate.

== Second qualifying round ==
=== Seeding ===
A total of 34 teams played in the second qualifying round: 32 teams which entered in this round, and the two winners of the first qualifying round. The draw was held on 24 June 2013.

Group 1		Group 2		Group 3	
Seeded	Unseeded	Seeded	Unseeded	Seeded	Unseeded
(Romania) Steaua București (Czech Republic) Viktoria Plzeň (Moldova) Sheriff Tiraspol (Slovenia) Maribor (Azerbaijan) Neftçi	(Bosnia and Herzegovina) Željezničar (Albania) Skënderbeu (Malta) Birkirkara (North Macedonia) Vardar (Montenegro) Sutjeska	(Scotland) Celtic (Poland) Legia Warsaw (Sweden) IF Elfsborg (Norway) Molde (Finland) HJK (Lithuania) Ekranas	(Iceland) FH (Wales) The New Saints (Republic of Ireland) Sligo Rovers (Northern Ireland) Cliftonville (Latvia) Daugava Daugavpils (Estonia) Nõmme Kalju	(Belarus) BATE Borisov (Croatia) Dinamo Zagreb (Serbia) Partizan (Slovakia) Slovan Bratislava (Israel) Maccabi Tel Aviv (Georgia (country)) Dinamo Tbilisi	(Hungary) Győri ETO (Bulgaria) Ludogorets Razgrad (Kazakhstan) Shakhter Karagandy (Faroe Islands) EB/Streymur (Armenia) Shirak (Luxembourg) Fola Esch

Notes

1. ^{†} Winners of the first qualifying round whose identity was not known at the time of the draw. Teams in italics defeated a team with a higher coefficient in the first qualifying round, thus effectively taking the coefficient of their defeated opponent in the draw for the second qualifying round.

=== Summary ===
The first legs were played on 16 and 17 July, and the second legs were played on 23 and 24 July 2013.

Team 1	Agg.	Team 2	1st leg	2nd leg
Neftçi (Azerbaijan)	0–1	(Albania) Skënderbeu	0–0	0–1 (a.e.t.)
Steaua București (Romania)	5–1	(North Macedonia) Vardar	3–0	2–1
Viktoria Plzeň (Czech Republic)	6–4	(Bosnia and Herzegovina) Željezničar	4–3	2–1
Sheriff Tiraspol (Moldova)	6–1	(Montenegro) Sutjeska	1–1	5–0
Birkirkara (Malta)	0–2	(Slovenia) Maribor	0–0	0–2
Sligo Rovers (Republic of Ireland)	0–3	(Norway) Molde	0–1	0–2
IF Elfsborg (Sweden)	11–1	(Latvia) Daugava Daugavpils	7–1	4–0
HJK (Finland)	1–2	(Estonia) Nõmme Kalju	0–0	1–2
Ekranas (Lithuania)	1–3	(Iceland) FH	0–1	1–2
The New Saints (Wales)	1–4	(Poland) Legia Warsaw	1–3	0–1
Cliftonville (Northern Ireland)	0–5 (Note: Order of legs reversed after original draw.)	(Scotland) Celtic	0–3	0–2
Fola Esch (Luxembourg)	0–6	(Croatia) Dinamo Zagreb	0–5	0–1
Győri ETO (Hungary)	1–4	(Israel) Maccabi Tel Aviv	0–2	1–2
BATE Borisov (Belarus)	0–2	(Kazakhstan) Shakhter Karagandy	0–1	0–1
Shirak (Armenia)	1–1 (a)	(Serbia) Partizan	1–1	0–0
Slovan Bratislava (Slovakia)	2–4	(Bulgaria) Ludogorets Razgrad	2–1	0–3
Dinamo Tbilisi (Georgia (country))	9–2	(Faroe Islands) EB/Streymur	6–1	3–1

=== Matches ===
17 July 2013
18:00

Neftçi (Azerbaijan)	0–0	(Albania) Skënderbeu
	Report

Bakcell Arena, Baku
Attendance: 10,200
Referee: Leontios Trattou (Cyprus)
23 July 2013
20:00

Skënderbeu (Albania)	1–0 (a.e.t.)	(Azerbaijan) Neftçi
Orelesi 116'	Report

Skënderbeu Stadium, Korçë
Attendance: 3,500
Referee: Paweł Gil (Poland)

Skënderbeu won 1–0 on aggregate.

16 July 2013
19:45

Steaua București (Romania)	3–0	(North Macedonia) Vardar
Tănase 12'; Pintilii 21'; Pavlović 45+2' (o.g.)	Report

Arena Națională, Bucharest
Attendance: 36,433
Referee: Radek Příhoda (Czech Republic)
23 July 2013
20:45

Vardar (North Macedonia)	1–2	(Romania) Steaua București
Kostovski 45+1'	Report	Piovaccari 23'; Bourceanu 72'

Philip II Arena, Skopje
Attendance: 3,450
Referee: Oleksandr Derdo (Ukraine)

Steaua București won 5–1 on aggregate.

16 July 2013
17:30

Viktoria Plzeň (Czech Republic)	4–3	(Bosnia and Herzegovina) Željezničar
Čišovský 63'; Kolář 66', 76'; Rajtoral 81'	Report	Tomić 52'; Selimović 78'; Bučan 85'

Doosan Arena, Plzeň
Attendance: 10,381
Referee: César Muñiz Fernández (Spain)
23 July 2013
21:00

Željezničar (Bosnia and Herzegovina)	1–2	(Czech Republic) Viktoria Plzeň
Jamak 45'	Report	Wágner 5'; Petržela 30'

Asim Ferhatović Hase Stadium, Sarajevo (Note: Željezničar played their home match at Asim Ferhatović Hase Stadium, instead of their regular stadium Grbavica.)
Attendance: 15,000
Referee: João Capela (Portugal)

Viktoria Plzeň won 6–4 on aggregate.

16 July 2013
19:00

Sheriff Tiraspol (Moldova)	1–1	(Montenegro) Sutjeska
Luvannor 45'	Report	Pejović 54'

Stadionul Sheriff, Tiraspol
Attendance: 6,153
Referee: Bülent Yıldırım (Turkey)
23 July 2013
17:30

Sutjeska (Montenegro)	0–5	(Moldova) Sheriff Tiraspol
	Report	Cadú 14'; Ricardinho 47'; Fernando 52', 65'; Scripcenco 86'

Gradski stadion, Nikšić
Attendance: 5,100
Referee: Vladimir Kazmenko (Russia)

Sheriff Tiraspol won 6–1 on aggregate.

16 July 2013
19:30

Birkirkara (Malta)	0–0	(Slovenia) Maribor
	Report

Ta' Qali National Stadium, Ta' Qali
Attendance: 1,419
Referee: Radu Marian Petrescu (Romania)
24 July 2013
20:00

Maribor (Slovenia)	2–0	(Malta) Birkirkara
Cvijanović 28'; Viler 47'	Report

Ljudski vrt, Maribor
Attendance: 9,036
Referee: Andris Treimanis (Latvia)

Maribor won 2–0 on aggregate.

17 July 2013
19:00

Sligo Rovers (Republic of Ireland)	0–1	(Norway) Molde
	Report	Chima Chukwu 42'

The Showgrounds, Sligo
Attendance: 3,840
Referee: Alexandre Boucaut (Belgium)
23 July 2013
19:00

Molde (Norway)	2–0	(Republic of Ireland) Sligo Rovers
Linnes 5'; Coly 78'	Report

Aker Stadion, Molde
Attendance: 5,765
Referee: Danilo Grujić (Serbia)

Molde won 3–0 on aggregate.

17 July 2013
19:00

IF Elfsborg (Sweden)	7–1	(Latvia) Daugava Daugavpils
Rohdén 21', 62'; Sokolovs 48' (o.g.); Nilsson 61'; Bangura 68'; Claesson 89'; Holmén 90+2'	Report	Babatunde 78'

Borås Arena, Borås
Attendance: 3,342
Referee: Carlos del Cerro Grande (Spain)
23 July 2013
17:00

Daugava Daugavpils (Latvia)	0–4	(Sweden) IF Elfsborg
	Report	Keene 41'; Claesson 61'; Hult 66'; M. Andersson 86' (pen.)

Daugava Stadium, Daugavpils
Attendance: 350
Referee: Athanasios Giachos (Greece)

IF Elfsborg won 11–1 on aggregate.

17 July 2013
17:30

HJK (Finland)	0–0	(Estonia) Nõmme Kalju
	Report

Sonera Stadium, Helsinki
Attendance: 7,011
Referee: Jovan Kaludjerović (Montenegro)
23 July 2013
17:30

Nõmme Kalju (Estonia)	2–1	(Finland) HJK
Ceesay 28'; Quintieri 35'	Report	Savage 64'

Kadriorg Stadium, Tallinn
Attendance: 4,880
Referee: Milenko Vukadinović (Serbia)

Nõmme Kalju won 2–1 on aggregate.

16 July 2013
19:00

Ekranas (Lithuania)	0–1	(Iceland) FH
	Report	Viðarsson 30'

Aukštaitija Stadium, Panevėžys
Attendance: 1,753
Referee: Dag Vidar Hafsås (Norway)
23 July 2013
21:15

FH (Iceland)	2–1	(Lithuania) Ekranas
Sverrisson 38'; Björnsson 90+2'	Report	Buinickij 26' (pen.)

Kaplakriki, Hafnarfjörður
Attendance: 1,623
Referee: Ivan Kružliak (Slovakia)

FH won 3–1 on aggregate.

17 July 2013
20:15

The New Saints (Wales)	1–3	(Poland) Legia Warsaw
Fraughan 11'	Report	Kucharczyk 47'; Saganowski 57'; Kosecki 74'

Racecourse Ground, Wrexham (Note: The New Saints played their home match at the Racecourse Ground, Wrexham, instead of their regular stadium, Park Hall, Oswestry.)
Attendance: 2,925
Referee: Thorvaldur Árnason (Iceland)
24 July 2013
20:45

Legia Warsaw (Poland)	1–0	(Wales) The New Saints
Dvalishvili 53'	Report

Pepsi Arena, Warsaw
Attendance: 11,712
Referee: Bardhyl Pashaj (Albania)

Legia Warsaw won 4–1 on aggregate.

17 July 2013
20:45

Cliftonville (Northern Ireland)	0–3	(Scotland) Celtic
	Report	Lustig 25'; Samaras 31'; Forrest 84'

Solitude, Belfast
Attendance: 5,442
Referee: Serhiy Boyko (Ukraine)
23 July 2013
20:45

Celtic (Scotland)	2–0	(Northern Ireland) Cliftonville
Ambrose 16'; Samaras 70'	Report

Celtic Park, Glasgow
Attendance: 37,097
Referee: Thorsten Kinhöfer (Germany)

Celtic won 5–0 on aggregate.

16 July 2013
19:30

Fola Esch (Luxembourg)	0–5	(Croatia) Dinamo Zagreb
	Report	Soudani 59', 63'; Čop 64'; Ademi 75'; Fernándes 79'

Stade Municipal, Differdange (Note: Fola Esch played their home match at Stade Municipal, Differdange, instead of their regular stadium, Stade Émile Mayrisch, Esch-sur-Alzette.)
Attendance: 1,489
Referee: Bobby Madden (Scotland)
23 July 2013
20:45

Dinamo Zagreb (Croatia)	1–0	(Luxembourg) Fola Esch
Kramarić 78' (pen.)	Report

Stadion Maksimir, Zagreb
Attendance: 8,995
Referee: Lasha Silagava (Georgia)

Dinamo Zagreb won 6–0 on aggregate.

17 July 2013
20:30

Győri ETO (Hungary)	0–2	(Israel) Maccabi Tel Aviv
	Report	Itzhaki 76'; Alberman 90+3'

ETO Park, Győr
Attendance: 8,175
Referee: Markus Hameter (Austria)
23 July 2013
20:30

Maccabi Tel Aviv (Israel)	2–1	(Hungary) Győri ETO
Ben Haim 25'; Zahavi 79'	Report	Martínez 86'

Bloomfield Stadium, Tel Aviv
Attendance: 12,732
Referee: Martin Hansson (Sweden)

Maccabi Tel Aviv won 4–1 on aggregate.

16 July 2013
18:00

BATE Borisov (Belarus)	0–1	(Kazakhstan) Shakhter Karagandy
	Report	Khizhnichenko 48'

City Stadium, Borisov
Attendance: 5,207
Referee: John Beaton (Scotland)
23 July 2013
15:30

Shakhter Karagandy (Kazakhstan)	1–0	(Belarus) BATE Borisov
Zyankovich 82'	Report

Shakhtyor Stadium, Karaganda
Attendance: 18,800
Referee: Stephan Klossner (Switzerland)

Shakhter Karagandy won 2–0 on aggregate.

17 July 2013
15:00

Shirak (Armenia)	1–1	(Serbia) Partizan
Hakobyan 48'	Report	Volkov 90+3'

Gyumri City Stadium, Gyumri
Attendance: 2,860
Referee: Libor Kovařík (Czech Republic)
24 July 2013
20:45

Partizan (Serbia)	0–0	(Armenia) Shirak
	Report

Partizan Stadium, Belgrade
Attendance: 15,742
Referee: Ioannis Anastasiou (Cyprus)

1–1 on aggregate; Partizan won on away goals.

17 July 2013
20:15

Slovan Bratislava (Slovakia)	2–1	(Bulgaria) Ludogorets Razgrad
Halenár 87', 90+3' (pen.)	Report	Mäntylä 65'

Štadión Pasienky, Bratislava
Attendance: 8,126
Referee: Anthony Taylor (England)
24 July 2013
19:30

Ludogorets Razgrad (Bulgaria)	3–0	(Slovakia) Slovan Bratislava
I. Stoyanov 3'; Dani Abalo 12', 78'	Report

Ludogorets Arena, Razgrad
Attendance: 3,890
Referee: Mauro Bergonzi (Italy)

Ludogorets Razgrad won 4–2 on aggregate.

16 July 2013
18:00

Dinamo Tbilisi (Georgia (country))	6–1	(Faroe Islands) EB/Streymur
Ustaritz 40'; Dvali 43'; Grigalashvili 72'; Xisco 75'; Vouho 77', 81'	Report	Glišić 42' (o.g.)

Boris Paichadze Dinamo Arena, Tbilisi
Attendance: 9,425
Referee: Alan Mario Sant (Malta)
23 July 2013
20:00

EB/Streymur (Faroe Islands)	1–3	(Georgia (country)) Dinamo Tbilisi
Danielsen 27'	Report	Xisco 7' (pen.); Dvali 12'; Glišić 84'

Tórsvøllur, Tórshavn
Attendance: 317
Referee: Simon Lee Evans (Wales)

Dinamo Tbilisi won 9–2 on aggregate.

== Third qualifying round ==
=== Seeding ===
A total of 30 teams played in the third qualifying round:

- Champions Route: three teams which entered in this round, and the 17 winners of the second qualifying round.
- League Route: ten teams which entered in this round.

The draw was held on 19 July 2013.

Champions Route				League Route	
Group 1		Group 2		League Route	
Seeded	Unseeded	Seeded	Unseeded	Seeded	Unseeded
(Switzerland) Basel (Romania) Steaua București (Cyprus) APOEL (Serbia) Partizan (Poland) Legia Warsaw	(Slovenia) Maribor (Bulgaria) Ludogorets Razgrad (Israel) Maccabi Tel Aviv (Norway) Molde (Georgia (country)) Dinamo Tbilisi	(Kazakhstan) Shakhter Karagandy (Scotland) Celtic (Czech Republic) Viktoria Plzeň (Croatia) Dinamo Zagreb; Austria Wien	(Moldova) Sheriff Tiraspol (Sweden) IF Elfsborg (Estonia) Nõmme Kalju (Iceland) FH (Albania) Skënderbeu	(France) Lyon (Russia) Zenit Saint Petersburg (Netherlands) PSV Eindhoven (Ukraine) Metalist Kharkiv (Turkey) Fenerbahçe	(Greece) PAOK (Austria) Red Bull Salzburg (Denmark) Nordsjælland (Switzerland) Grasshopper (Belgium) Zulte Waregem

Notes

1. ^{†} Winners of the second qualifying round whose identity was not known at the time of the draw. Teams in italics defeated a team with a higher coefficient in the second qualifying round, thus effectively taking the coefficient of their defeated opponent in the draw for the third qualifying round.

=== Summary ===
The first legs were played on 30 and 31 July, and the second legs were played on 6 and 7 August 2013.

Team 1	Agg.	Team 2	1st leg	2nd leg
Champions Route
Basel (Switzerland)	4–3	(Israel) Maccabi Tel Aviv	1–0	3–3
Molde (Norway)	1–1 (a)	(Poland) Legia Warsaw	1–1	0–0
Ludogorets Razgrad (Bulgaria)	3–1	(Serbia) Partizan	2–1	1–0
Dinamo Tbilisi (Georgia (country))	1–3	(Romania) Steaua București	0–2	1–1
APOEL (Cyprus)	1–1 (a)	(Slovenia) Maribor	1–1	0–0
Celtic (Scotland)	1–0	(Sweden) IF Elfsborg	1–0	0–0
Shakhter Karagandy (Kazakhstan)	5–3	(Albania) Skënderbeu	3–0	2–3
Austria Wien	1–0	(Iceland) FH	1–0	0–0
Nõmme Kalju (Estonia)	2–10	(Czech Republic) Viktoria Plzeň	0–4	2–6
Dinamo Zagreb (Croatia)	4–0	(Moldova) Sheriff Tiraspol	1–0	3–0
League Route
Nordsjælland (Denmark)	0–6	(Russia) Zenit Saint Petersburg	0–1	0–5
Red Bull Salzburg (Austria)	2–4	(Turkey) Fenerbahçe	1–1	1–3
PAOK (Greece)	1–3	(Ukraine) Metalist Kharkiv	0–2	1–1
PSV Eindhoven (Netherlands)	5–0	(Belgium) Zulte Waregem	2–0	3–0
Lyon (France)	2–0	(Switzerland) Grasshopper	1–0	1–0

=== Champions Route matches ===
30 July 2013
19:00

Basel (Switzerland)	1–0	(Israel) Maccabi Tel Aviv
Stocker 39'	Report

St. Jakob-Park, Basel
Attendance: 12,353
Referee: Szymon Marciniak (Poland)
6 August 2013
19:00

Maccabi Tel Aviv (Israel)	3–3	(Switzerland) Basel
Schär 34' (o.g.); Zahavi 37'; Radi 55'	Report	Schär 5' (pen.); Salah 21'; Díaz 32'

Bloomfield Stadium, Tel Aviv
Attendance: 13,100
Referee: Clément Turpin (France)

Basel won 4–3 on aggregate.

31 July 2013
19:00

Molde (Norway)	1–1	(Poland) Legia Warsaw
Chima Chukwu 29'	Report	Dvalishvili 68'

Aker Stadion, Molde
Attendance: 6,063
Referee: Anastassios Kakos (Greece)
7 August 2013
20:45

Legia Warsaw (Poland)	0–0	(Norway) Molde
	Report

Pepsi Arena, Warsaw
Attendance: 23,379
Referee: Alexandru Tudor (Romania)

1–1 on aggregate; Legia Warsaw won on away goals.

31 July 2013
19:30

Ludogorets Razgrad (Bulgaria)	2–1	(Serbia) Partizan
Marcelinho 54'; Aleksandrov 65'	Report	Marković 49'

Ludogorets Arena, Razgrad
Attendance: 7,000
Referee: Michael Koukoulakis (Greece)
6 August 2013
20:45

Partizan (Serbia)	0–1	(Bulgaria) Ludogorets Razgrad
	Report	Zlatinski 88' (pen.)

Partizan Stadium, Belgrade
Attendance: 22,312
Referee: Alan Kelly (Republic of Ireland)

Ludogorets Razgrad won 3–1 on aggregate.

30 July 2013
18:00

Dinamo Tbilisi (Georgia (country))	0–2	(Romania) Steaua București
	Report	Iancu 64', 80'

Boris Paichadze Dinamo Arena, Tbilisi
Attendance: 20,728
Referee: Robert Schörgenhofer (Austria)
6 August 2013
19:45

Steaua București (Romania)	1–1	(Georgia (country)) Dinamo Tbilisi
Latovlevici 6'	Report	Ustaritz 48'

Arena Națională, Bucharest
Attendance: 37,249
Referee: Kristinn Jakobsson (Iceland)

Steaua București won 3–1 on aggregate.

31 July 2013
19:00

APOEL (Cyprus)	1–1	(Slovenia) Maribor
Gonçalves 21'	Report	Tavares 64'

GSP Stadium, Nicosia
Attendance: 17,387
Referee: Serhiy Boyko (Ukraine)
6 August 2013
20:00

Maribor (Slovenia)	0–0	(Cyprus) APOEL
	Report

Ljudski vrt, Maribor
Attendance: 12,100
Referee: Aleksei Kulbakov (Belarus)

1–1 on aggregate; Maribor won on away goals.

31 July 2013
20:45

Celtic (Scotland)	1–0	(Sweden) IF Elfsborg
Commons 76'	Report

Celtic Park, Glasgow
Attendance: 38,546
Referee: Jorge Sousa (Portugal)
7 August 2013
19:45

IF Elfsborg (Sweden)	0–0	(Scotland) Celtic
	Report

Borås Arena, Borås
Attendance: 9,040
Referee: Vladislav Bezborodov (Russia)

Celtic won 1–0 on aggregate.

30 July 2013
15:00

Shakhter Karagandy (Kazakhstan)	3–0	(Albania) Skënderbeu
Đidić 8'; Murtazayev 79'; Khizhnichenko 90'	Report

Astana Arena, Astana
Attendance: 21,800
Referee: Aleksei Nikolaev (Russia)
6 August 2013
20:00

Skënderbeu (Albania)	3–2	(Kazakhstan) Shakhter Karagandy
Tomić 9'; Shkëmbi 20' (pen.), 29' (pen.)	Report	Khizhnichenko 38'; Baizhanov 67'

Qemal Stafa Stadium, Tirana (Note: Skënderbeu played their home match against Shakhter at Qemal Stafa Stadium, Tirana, instead of their regular stadium, Skënderbeu Stadium, Korçë.)
Attendance: 2,500
Referee: Ivan Kružliak (Slovakia)

Shakhter Karagandy won 5–3 on aggregate.

30 July 2013
18:00

Austria Wien	1–0	(Iceland) FH
Royer 25'	Report

Generali Arena, Vienna
Attendance: 8,075
Referee: Bobby Madden (Scotland)
7 August 2013
18:00

FH (Iceland)	0–0	Austria Wien
	Report

Kaplakriki, Hafnarfjörður
Attendance: 2,647
Referee: Nikolay Yordanov (Bulgaria)

Austria Wien won 1–0 on aggregate.

30 July 2013
18:00

Nõmme Kalju (Estonia)	0–4	(Czech Republic) Viktoria Plzeň
	Report	Čišovský 2', 51', 90+2'; Ďuriš 77'

A. Le Coq Arena, Tallinn (Note: Nõmme Kalju played their home match against Viktoria at A. Le Coq Arena, instead of their regular stadium Kadriorg Stadium.)
Attendance: 4,220
Referee: Andre Marriner (England)
7 August 2013
20:15

Viktoria Plzeň (Czech Republic)	6–2	(Estonia) Nõmme Kalju
Horváth 20' (pen.), 44', 62'; Tecl 58'; Hořava 71'; Wágner 82'	Report	Quintieri 10', 69'

Doosan Arena, Plzeň
Attendance: 9,482
Referee: Stefan Johannesson (Sweden)

Viktoria Plzeň won 10–2 on aggregate.

30 July 2013
20:45

Dinamo Zagreb (Croatia)	1–0	(Moldova) Sheriff Tiraspol
Rukavina 89'	Report

Stadion Maksimir, Zagreb
Attendance: 10,347
Referee: Carlos Clos Gómez (Spain)
7 August 2013
19:00

Sheriff Tiraspol (Moldova)	0–3	(Croatia) Dinamo Zagreb
	Report	Fernándes 10'; Soudani 27'; Čop 61'

Stadionul Sheriff, Tiraspol
Attendance: 10,234
Referee: Danny Makkelie (Netherlands)

Dinamo Zagreb won 4–0 on aggregate.

=== League Route matches ===
30 July 2013
19:00

Nordsjælland (Denmark)	0–1	(Russia) Zenit Saint Petersburg
	Report	Kerzhakov 49'

Farum Park, Farum
Attendance: 5,417
Referee: Alon Yefet (Israel)
7 August 2013
18:00

Zenit Saint Petersburg (Russia)	5–0	(Denmark) Nordsjælland
Shirokov 26', 90+3'; Hulk 50'; Danny 62'; Arshavin 68'	Report

Petrovsky Stadium, Saint Petersburg
Attendance: 20,072
Referee: Serge Gumienny (Belgium)

Zenit Saint Petersburg won 6–0 on aggregate.

31 July 2013
20:30

Red Bull Salzburg (Austria)	1–1	(Turkey) Fenerbahçe
Alan 68'	Report	Cristian 90+5' (pen.)

Red Bull Arena, Wals-Siezenheim
Attendance: 28,640
Referee: Duarte Gomes (Portugal)
6 August 2013
20:45

Fenerbahçe (Turkey)	3–1	(Austria) Red Bull Salzburg
Raul Meireles 8'; Sow 17'; Webó 34'	Report	Jonatan Soriano 4'

Şükrü Saracoğlu Stadium, Istanbul
Attendance: 32,669
Referee: Paweł Gil (Poland)

Fenerbahçe won 4–2 on aggregate.

30 July 2013
20:00

PAOK (Greece)	0–2	(Ukraine) Metalist Kharkiv
	Report	Dević 43' (pen.), 72'

Toumba Stadium, Thessaloniki
Attendance: 200 (Note: PAOK home matches against Metalist and Schalke were played behind closed doors due to punishment by UEFA.)
Referee: Pol van Boekel (Netherlands)
7 August 2013
19:00

Metalist Kharkiv (Ukraine)	1–1	(Greece) PAOK
Blanco 72'	Report	Necid 83'

OSC Metalist, Kharkiv
Attendance: 39,286
Referee: Florian Meyer (Germany)

Metalist Kharkiv won 3–1 on aggregate.

30 July 2013
20:45

PSV Eindhoven (Netherlands)	2–0	(Belgium) Zulte Waregem
Depay 61'; Locadia 75'	Report

Philips Stadion, Eindhoven
Attendance: 35,000
Referee: Luca Banti (Italy)
7 August 2013
20:45

Zulte Waregem (Belgium)	0–3	(Netherlands) PSV Eindhoven
	Report	Matavž 56' (pen.); Bakkali 73'; Godeau 90' (o.g.)

Constant Vanden Stock, Brussels (Note: Zulte Waregem played their home match at Constant Vanden Stock, Brussels, instead of their regular stadium Regenboogstadion, Waregem.)
Attendance: 6,189
Referee: Felix Zwayer (Germany)

PSV Eindhoven won 5–0 on aggregate.

30 July 2013
21:00

Lyon (France)	1–0	(Switzerland) Grasshopper
Biševac 64'	Report

Stade de Gerland, Lyon
Attendance: 27,331
Referee: Hüseyin Göçek (Turkey)
6 August 2013
21:00

Grasshopper (Switzerland)	0–1	(France) Lyon
	Report	Grenier 82'

Letzigrund, Zürich
Attendance: 9,500
Referee: Antonio Mateu Lahoz (Spain)

Lyon won 2–0 on aggregate.

== Play-off round ==
=== Seeding ===
A total of 20 teams played in the play-off round:

- Champions Route: the ten Champions Route winners of the third qualifying round.
- League Route: five teams which entered in this round, and the five League Route winners of the third qualifying round.

The draw was held on 9 August 2013.

Champions Route		League Route	
Seeded	Unseeded	Seeded	Unseeded
(Switzerland) Basel (Scotland) Celtic (Romania) Steaua București (Czech Republic) Viktoria Plzeň (Croatia) Dinamo Zagreb	Austria Wien (Poland) Legia Warsaw (Slovenia) Maribor (Bulgaria) Ludogorets Razgrad (Kazakhstan) Shakhter Karagandy	(England) Arsenal (France) Lyon (Italy) Milan (Germany) Schalke 04 (Russia) Zenit Saint Petersburg	(Netherlands) PSV Eindhoven (Ukraine) Metalist Kharkiv (Turkey) Fenerbahçe (Spain) Real Sociedad (Portugal) Paços de Ferreira

Notes

1. ^{†} On 14 August 2013, Metalist Kharkiv were disqualified from the 2013–14 UEFA club competitions because of previous match-fixing. UEFA decided to replace Metalist Kharkiv in the Champions League play-off round with PAOK, who were eliminated by Metalist Kharkiv in the third qualifying round.

=== Summary ===
The first legs were played on 20 and 21 August, and the second legs were played on 27 and 28 August 2013.

Team 1	Agg.	Team 2	1st leg	2nd leg
Champions Route
Dinamo Zagreb (Croatia)	3–4	Austria Wien	0–2	3–2
Ludogorets Razgrad (Bulgaria)	2–6	(Switzerland) Basel	2–4	0–2
Viktoria Plzeň (Czech Republic)	4–1	(Slovenia) Maribor	3–1	1–0
Shakhter Karagandy (Kazakhstan)	2–3	(Scotland) Celtic	2–0	0–3
Steaua București (Romania)	3–3 (a)	(Poland) Legia Warsaw	1–1	2–2
League Route
Lyon (France)	0–4	(Spain) Real Sociedad	0–2	0–2
Schalke 04 (Germany)	4–3	(Greece) PAOK	1–1	3–2
Paços de Ferreira (Portugal)	3–8	(Russia) Zenit Saint Petersburg	1–4	2–4
PSV Eindhoven (Netherlands)	1–4	(Italy) Milan	1–1	0–3
Fenerbahçe (Turkey)	0–5	(England) Arsenal	0–3	0–2

=== Champions Route matches ===
21 August 2013
20:45

Dinamo Zagreb (Croatia)	0–2	Austria Wien
	Report	Leovac 68'; Stanković 75'

Stadion Maksimir, Zagreb
Attendance: 21,729
Referee: Howard Webb (England)
27 August 2013
20:45

Austria Wien	2–3	(Croatia) Dinamo Zagreb
Mader 5'; Kienast 82'	Report	Brozović 33'; Fernándes 43'; Bećiraj 70'

Generali Arena, Vienna
Attendance: 10,500
Referee: Paolo Tagliavento (Italy)

Austria Wien won 4–3 on aggregate.

21 August 2013
20:45

Ludogorets Razgrad (Bulgaria)	2–4	(Switzerland) Basel
Marcelinho 23'; I. Stoyanov 50'	Report	Salah 12', 59'; Sio 64'; Schär 84' (pen.)

Vasil Levski National Stadium, Sofia (Note: Match played at Vasil Levski National Stadium, Sofia, instead of Ludogorets' regular stadium, Ludogorets Arena, Razgrad.)
Attendance: 11,927
Referee: Wolfgang Stark (Germany)
27 August 2013
20:45

Basel (Switzerland)	2–0	(Bulgaria) Ludogorets Razgrad
Frei 11'; P. Degen 79'	Report

St. Jakob-Park, Basel
Attendance: 15,733
Referee: William Collum (Scotland)

Basel won 6–2 on aggregate.

20 August 2013
20:45

Viktoria Plzeň (Czech Republic)	3–1	(Slovenia) Maribor
Čišovský 8'; Darida 58'; Ďuriš 89'	Report	Mejač 66'

Doosan Arena, Plzeň
Attendance: 11,158
Referee: Olegário Benquerença (Portugal)
28 August 2013
20:45

Maribor (Slovenia)	0–1	(Czech Republic) Viktoria Plzeň
	Report	Tecl 3'

Ljudski vrt, Maribor
Attendance: 12,306
Referee: Felix Brych (Germany)

Viktoria Plzeň won 4–1 on aggregate.

20 August 2013
17:00

Shakhter Karagandy (Kazakhstan)	2–0	(Scotland) Celtic
Finonchenko 12'; Khizhnichenko 77'	Report

Astana Arena, Astana (Note: Match played their at Astana Arena, Astana, instead of Shakhter's regular stadium Shakhtyor Stadium, Karaganda.)
Attendance: 29,950
Referee: Pavel Královec (Czech Republic)
28 August 2013
20:45

Celtic (Scotland)	3–0	(Kazakhstan) Shakhter Karagandy
Commons 45+1'; Samaras 48'; Forrest 90+2'	Report

Celtic Park, Glasgow
Attendance: 50,063
Referee: Svein Oddvar Moen (Norway)

Celtic won 3–2 on aggregate.

21 August 2013
20:45

Steaua București (Romania)	1–1	(Poland) Legia Warsaw
Piovaccari 34'	Report	Kosecki 53'

Arena Națională, Bucharest
Attendance: 50,655
Referee: Nicola Rizzoli (Italy)
27 August 2013
20:45

Legia Warsaw (Poland)	2–2	(Romania) Steaua București
Radović 27'; Rzeźniczak 90+4'	Report	Stanciu 7'; Piovaccari 9'

Pepsi Arena, Warsaw
Attendance: 21,514
Referee: Pedro Proença (Portugal)

3–3 on aggregate; Steaua București won on away goals.

=== League Route matches ===
20 August 2013
20:45

Lyon (France)	0–2	(Spain) Real Sociedad
	Report	Griezmann 17'; Seferovic 50'

Stade de Gerland, Lyon
Attendance: 38,156
Referee: Milorad Mažić (Serbia)
28 August 2013
20:45

Real Sociedad (Spain)	2–0	(France) Lyon
Vela 67', 90+1'	Report

Anoeta, San Sebastián
Attendance: 28,955
Referee: Damir Skomina (Slovenia)

Real Sociedad won 4–0 on aggregate.

21 August 2013
20:45

Schalke 04 (Germany)	1–1	(Greece) PAOK
Farfán 32'	Report	Stoch 73'

Arena AufSchalke, Gelsenkirchen
Attendance: 52,444
Referee: Stéphane Lannoy (France)
27 August 2013
20:45

PAOK (Greece)	2–3	(Germany) Schalke 04
Athanasiadis 53'; Katsouranis 79'	Report	Szalai 43', 90'; Draxler 67'

Toumba Stadium, Thessaloniki
Attendance: 350
Referee: Björn Kuipers (Netherlands)

Schalke 04 won 4–3 on aggregate.

20 August 2013
20:45

Paços de Ferreira (Portugal)	1–4	(Russia) Zenit Saint Petersburg
André Leão 58'	Report	Shirokov 27', 60', 90'; Degra 85' (o.g.)

Estádio do Dragão, Porto
Attendance: 4,466
Referee: Martin Atkinson (England)
28 August 2013
18:00

Zenit Saint Petersburg (Russia)	4–2	(Portugal) Paços de Ferreira
Danny 29', 48'; Bukharov 66'; Arshavin 78' (pen.)	Report	Manuel José 67'; Carlão 83'

Petrovsky Stadium, Saint Petersburg
Attendance: 19,976
Referee: Alberto Undiano Mallenco (Spain)

Zenit Saint Petersburg won 8–3 on aggregate.

20 August 2013
20:45

PSV Eindhoven (Netherlands)	1–1	(Italy) Milan
Matavž 60'	Report	El Shaarawy 15'

Philips Stadion, Eindhoven
Attendance: 35,000
Referee: Cüneyt Çakır (Turkey)
28 August 2013
20:45

Milan (Italy)	3–0	(Netherlands) PSV Eindhoven
Boateng 9', 77'; Balotelli 55'	Report

San Siro, Milan
Attendance: 51,598
Referee: Mark Clattenburg (England)

Milan won 4–1 on aggregate.

21 August 2013
20:45

Fenerbahçe (Turkey)	0–3	(England) Arsenal
	Report	Gibbs 51'; Ramsey 64'; Giroud 77' (pen.)

Şükrü Saracoğlu Stadium, Istanbul
Attendance: 40,375
Referee: Gianluca Rocchi (Italy)
27 August 2013
20:45

Arsenal (England)	2–0	(Turkey) Fenerbahçe
Ramsey 25', 72'	Report

Emirates Stadium, London
Attendance: 56,271
Referee: Carlos Velasco Carballo (Spain)

Arsenal won 5–0 on aggregate.

== Statistics ==
There were 235 goals in 88 matches in the qualifying phase and play-off round, for an average of 2.67 goals per match.

=== Top goalscorers ===
Rank	Player	Team	Goals	Minutes played
1	(Russia) Roman Shirokov	(Russia) Zenit Saint Petersburg	5	225
1	(Slovakia) Marián Čišovský	(Czech Republic) Viktoria Plzeň	5	540
3	(Kazakhstan) Sergei Khizhnichenko	(Kazakhstan) Shakhter Karagandy	4	523
4	(Wales) Aaron Ramsey	(England) Arsenal	3	180
4	(Egypt) Mohamed Salah	(Switzerland) Basel	3	321
4	(Portugal) Danny	(Russia) Zenit Saint Petersburg	3	333
4	(Italy) Damiano Quintieri	(Estonia) Nõmme Kalju	3	345
4	(Italy) Federico Piovaccari	(Romania) Steaua București	3	358
4	(Ivory Coast) Ismaël Fofana	(Armenia) Shirak	3	360
4	(Faroe Islands) Levi Hanssen	(Faroe Islands) EB/Streymur	3	360
4	(Algeria) Hillal Soudani	(Croatia) Dinamo Zagreb	3	473
4	(Greece) Georgios Samaras	(Scotland) Celtic	3	502
4	(Czech Republic) Pavel Horváth	(Czech Republic) Viktoria Plzeň	3	519
4	(Chile) Júnior Fernándes	(Croatia) Dinamo Zagreb	3	540

=== Top assists ===
Rank	Player	Team	Assists	Minutes played
1	(Brazil) Júnior Caiçara	(Bulgaria) Ludogorets Razgrad	5	443
1	(Czech Republic) Vladimír Darida	(Czech Republic) Viktoria Plzeň	5	532
3	(Czech Republic) Pavel Horváth	(Czech Republic) Viktoria Plzeň	4	519
4	(Brazil) Hulk	(Russia) Zenit Saint Petersburg	3	173
4	(Faroe Islands) Hans Pauli Samuelsen	(Faroe Islands) EB/Streymur	3	180
4	(Czech Republic) František Rajtoral	(Czech Republic) Viktoria Plzeň	3	251
4	(Chile) Marcelo Díaz	(Switzerland) Basel	3	333
4	(Romania) Alexandru Bourceanu	(Romania) Steaua București	3	540
4	(Serbia) Aleksandar Simčević	(Kazakhstan) Shakhter Karagandy	3	540
