= Damiano Quintieri =

Italian footballer (born 1990)

Personal information
- Full name: Damiano Quintieri
- Date of birth: 4 May 1990 (age 36)
- Place of birth: Terranova da Sibari, Italy
- Height: 1.79 m (5 ft 10 in)
- Position: Midfielder

Team information
- Current team: Argentina Arma

Youth career
- 1998–2004: Inter Logus Tarsia
- 2004–2007: Inter
- 2007–2008: Pro Sesto
- 2008–2009: Pisa

Senior career*
Years	Team	Apps	(Gls)
2008–2009	Pisa	1	(0)
2009–2010	Montichiari	23	(0)
2010–2011	Valle Grecanica	5	(0)
2012–2015	Kalju Nomme	68	(14)
2016–2017	Kalju Nomme	24	(3)
2017–	Argentina Arma	1	(0)
- * Club domestic league appearances and goals as of 19 June 2016

Damiano Quintieri (born 4 July 1990 in Terranova da Sibari) is an Italian footballer, who currently plays as a midfielder for Argentina Arma in the Serie D.

== Career ==
Quintieri began his youth career in Inter Logus Tarsia, a club from a town near his hometown, before moving to Inter's youth squad, in which he spent three years. In the 2008-2009 season he debuted in Serie B with Pisa, while the following season, after Pisa went into Administration, he joined Montichiari in Serie D, contributing with 23 appearances to the team's promotion to Lega Pro Seconda Divisione.

In the 2010-2011 season Quintieri played for Valle Grecanica in Serie D, before signing a three-year contract with Estonian club Kalju Nõmme, in the Meistriliiga, the top tier of Estonian football. Kalju Nomme won the 2012 Meistriliiga, and Quintieri contributed scoring 9 goals in 24 appearances in the league; he also debuted in the Europa League qualifiers, playing both matches versus Khazar Lankaran. The following season, he made his debut in the UEFA Champions League, scoring three goals in four appearances in the qualifying phase, including a brace in Kalju Nõmme's defeat against Viktoria Plzen.

== Honours ==
=== Club ===
==== Montichiari ====
- Serie D: 2009–2010

==== Kalju Nomme ====
- Meistriliiga: 2012
