= Visconti Castle (Castelletto sopra Ticino) =

Castle in Castelleto sopra Ticino, Piedmont, Italy

- Castello Visconteo di Castelletto
- Castelletto sopra Ticino
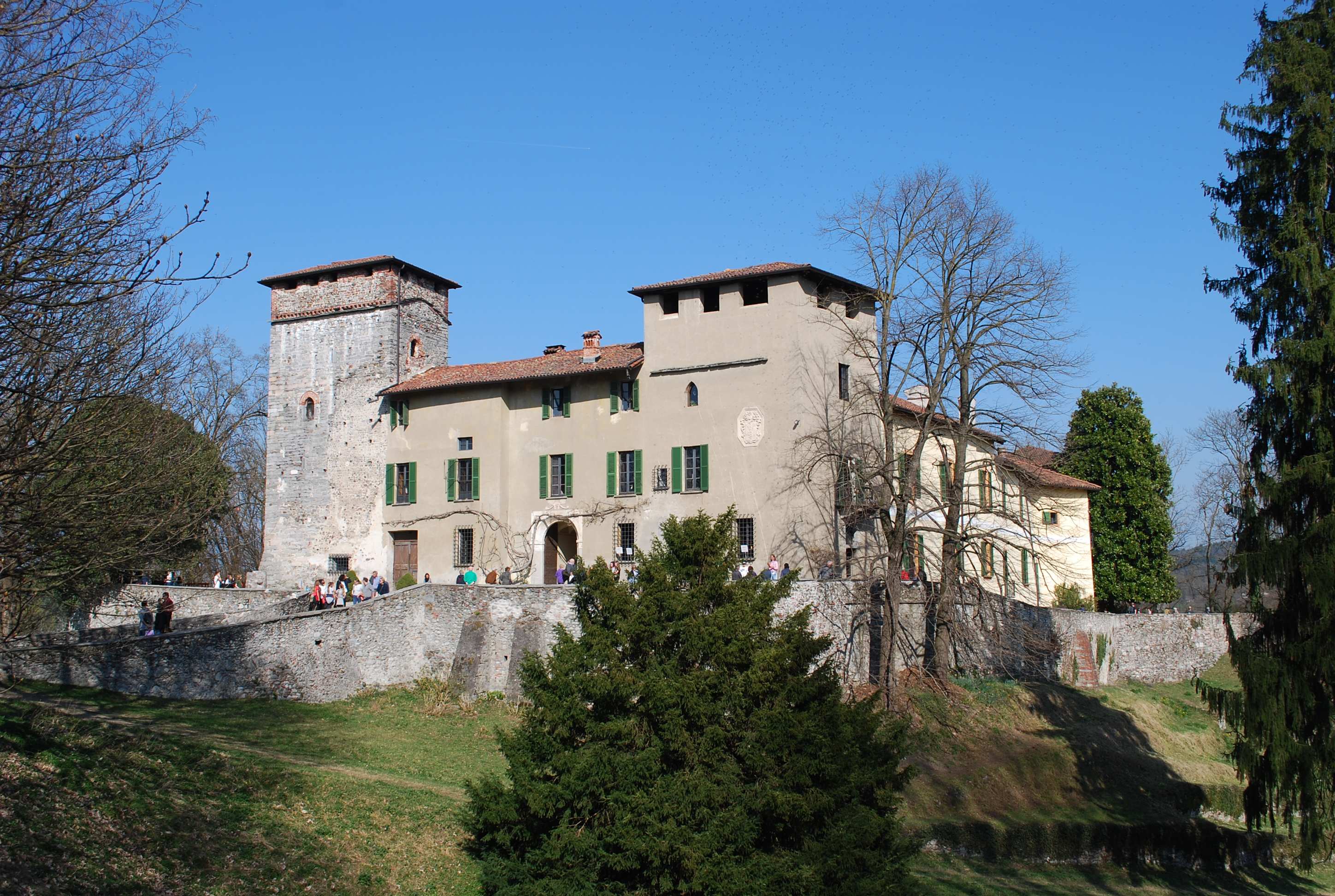
- Front of the castle

Site information
- Type: Medieval castle
- Open to the public: No
- Condition: Excellent

Location
- Coordinates: 45°42′57″N 8°38′54″E

Site history
- Built: 12th–13th centuries
- Built by: Da Castello, Visconti collateral branches
- Materials: Stone (ashlars and river pebbles)

The Visconti Castle of Castelletto is a castle of medieval origin in Castelletto sopra Ticino, Piedmont, northern Italy. It is named after the Visconti house, to which it belonged between the 13th and 20th centuries.

== Location ==
A short distance from Castelletto sopra Ticino, the castle lies in an overlooking position near the Ticino, a few hundred meters from where Lake Maggiore ceases and the southern portion of the river begins its course.

== History ==
The castle was first mentioned in the 12th century as the property of the Da Castello, a family from Novara.

In the 13th century, it was in the possession of members of a cadet branch of the Visconti house, Ottone and later Uberto Visconti, who originated the new cadet branch of the Visconti di Castelletto. In 1329, the Visconti di Castelletto obtained a royal diploma confirming their lordship on Castelletto sopra Ticino.

Enriched by duties on goods in transit along the river, the Visconti di Castelletto extended their dominions in the 15th century to the area surrounding the southern Lake Maggiore (Sesto Calende, Angera, Lisanza, Borgo Ticino, Pombia, Varallo Pombia, Invorio Superiore, Paruzzaro).

The castle was renovated over the following centuries, mainly on the western side, and transformed into an aristocratic residence. It had been a property of the Visconti until the beginning of the 20th century.

== Today ==
Today, the castle is a private real estate. It retains its original quadrilateral shape with a tower on each corner. It is in good condition.

Three types of masonry, probably related to different construction phases, are visible: river pebbles, squared stones, and plastered walls. The two towers facing the Ticino appear truncated. On one tower stands the coat of arms of the Visconti d'Aragona, the last Visconti branch to own the building.

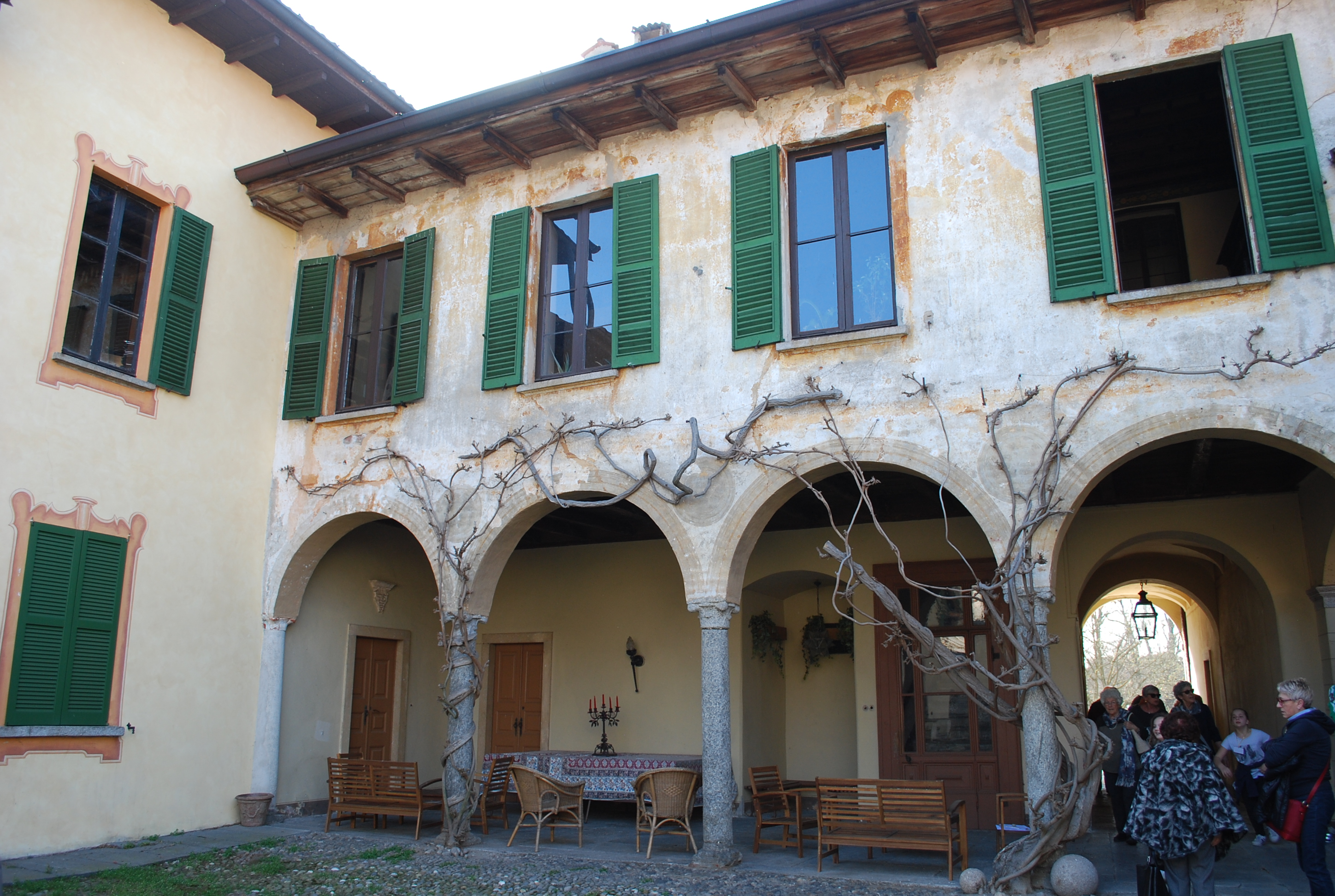
Inner courtyard

== In popular culture ==
Tommaso Grossi set some scenes of his historical novel Marco Visconti in the castle.

== Sources ==
- Del Tredici, Federico; Rossetti, Edoardo (2012). Castle trails from Milan to Bellinzona. Guide to the dukedom's castles. Milan: Nexi-Castelli del ducato. ISBN 9788896451069. OCLC 811550410. Archived from the original on July 13, 2024.
- Conti, Flavio (1975). I castelli del Piemonte (in Italian). Vol. Tomo I. Milan: Görlich Editore. OCLC 1440237235.
