= Serafino Belfanti =

Italian immunologist

Serafino Belfanti (28 March 1860 – 6 March 1939) was an Italian immunologist, founder of the Istituto Sieroterapico Milanese, the first Italian medical and vaccine research institute.

He was born in Castelletto sopra Ticino, near Novara.

After graduating in medical sciences, he worked at the Pasteur Institute in Paris and later with Prof. Robert Koch. In 1932 he was made an Italian senator honoris causa.

He died in Milan in 1939.
