= Castelletto sopra Ticino =

- Comune
- Comune di Castelletto sopra Ticino
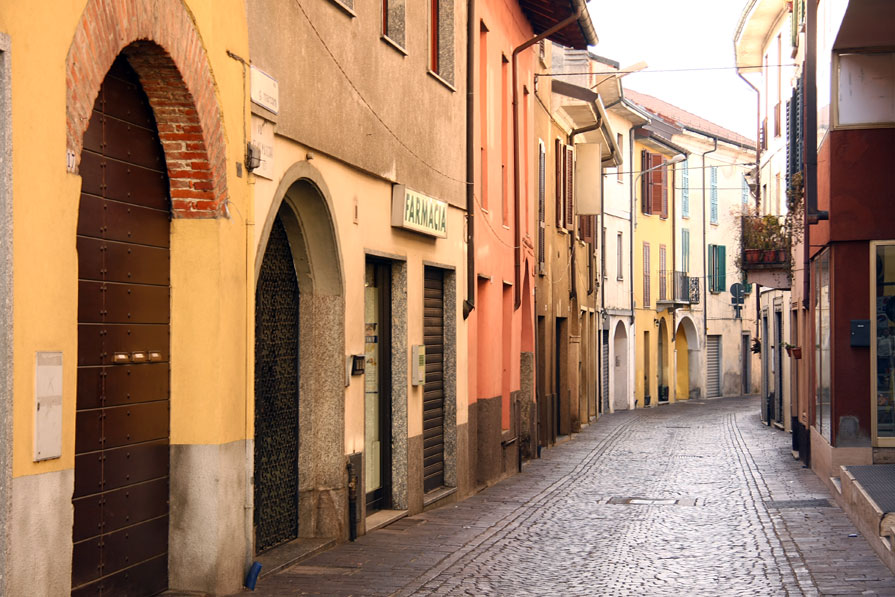
- View of Castelletto sopra Ticino

- Coat of arms

- Location within Italy Location within Piedmont
- Coordinates: 45°43′N 8°38′E
- Country: Italy
- Region: Piedmont
- Province: Novara (NO)
- Frazioni: Aronco, Beati, Buzzurri, Glisente, Landa, Curone, Valloni, Verbanella

Government
  - Mayor: Massimo Stilo

Area
  - Total: 14.64 km^{2} (5.65 sq mi)
- Elevation: 226 m (741 ft)

Population (31 December 2010)
  - Total: 10,259
  - Density: 700.8/km^{2} (1,815/sq mi)
- Demonym: Castellettesi
- Time zone: UTC+1 (CET)
  - Summer (DST): UTC+2 (CEST)
- Postal code: 28053
- Dialing code: 0331
- Patron saint: St. Anthony the Abbot
- Website: Official website

Castelletto sopra Ticino, also referred to by locals as Castelletto Ticino or just Castelletto, is a comune (municipality) in the Province of Novara in the Italian region of Piedmont, located about 100 km (62 mi) northeast of Turin and about 30 km (19 mi) north of Novara. Celtic inscriptions have been found.

== People ==
It is the birthplace of the immunologist Serafino Belfanti and the 1930s athlete Mario Lanzi; here died Vittorio Seghezzi, racing cyclist, and Aleardo Terzi, illustrator and artist. It is also where singer Billy More is buried.

== Visconti Castle ==
In Castelletto sopra Ticino, there's the medieval Visconti Castle, named after the Visconti family, to which it belonged between the 13th and 20th centuries.

== Sport ==
- AC Castellettese
