= AC Castellettese =

Italian football club

Castellettese
- Full name: Associazione Calcio Castellettese
- Nickname: –
- Founded: 1943
- Ground: Stadio Mario Zucco, Castelletto sopra Ticino, Italy
- Capacity: 1,000
- Chairman: Giuseppe Gentile
- Manager: Franco Delladonna
- League: Eccellenza Piedmont – A
- 2006–07: Serie D/A, 18th
Home colours	Away colours

Associazione Calcio Castellettese is an Italian association football club located in Castelletto sopra Ticino, Piedmont. It currently plays in Group A of the Eccellenza Piedmont, after having been directly relegated from Serie D in 2006/07. Its colors are white and blue.
