= 2024–25 Coppa Titano =

Tournament details
- Country: San Marino
- Teams: 15

Final positions
- Champions: Virtus
- Runners-up: Tre Fiori

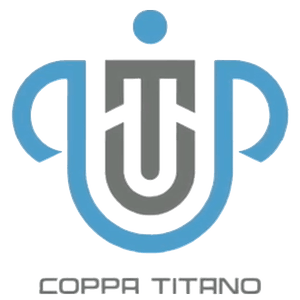

The 2024–25 Coppa Titano was the sixty-seventh edition of the football competition in San Marino. 15 of the 16 2024–25 Campionato Sammarinese di Calcio clubs participated. The winners qualified for the first qualifying round of the 2025–26 UEFA Conference League.

La Fiorita were the defending champions, but were knocked out by Virtus in the semi-finals.

== First round ==
The draw was made on 14 July 2024. 14 clubs entered the first round; defending champions La Fiorita received a bye. The first legs were held on 24 and 25 September 2024, followed by the second legs on 22 and 23 October 2024.

Team 1	Agg.	Team 2	1st leg	2nd leg
Tre Fiori	5–0	Libertas	2–0	3–0
Domagnano	1–2	San Giovanni	0–1	1–1
Folgore	1–0	Murata	1–0	0–0
Juvenes/Dogana	3–0	Fiorentino	1–0	2–0
Faetano	2–1	Pennarossa	2–1	0–0
Cosmos	2–3	Virtus	0–1	2–2
Cailungo	1–10	Tre Penne	0–6	1–4

== Quarter-finals ==
The seven first round winners and La Fiorita entered the quarter-finals. The first legs were held on 27 November 2024, followed by the second legs, which were played on 11 December 2024.

Team 1	Agg.	Team 2	1st leg	2nd leg
La Fiorita	4–0	Juvenes/Dogana	2–0	2–0
Faetano	1–6	Virtus	1–4	0–2
Tre Fiori	6–2	San Giovanni	4–0	2–2
Folgore	2–4	Tre Penne	0–1	2–3 (a.e.t.)

== Semi-finals ==
The four quarter-final winners entered the semi-finals. The first legs were held on 5 March 2025, followed by the second legs on 2 April 2025.

Team 1	Agg.	Team 2	1st leg	2nd leg
La Fiorita	0–1	Virtus	0–0	0–1
Tre Fiori	3–1	Tre Penne	3–0 (Note: Tre Penne was penalized for fielding a suspended player, the originally ended in favor for Tre Penne with a score of 0–1, the Sanmarinese Federation awarded a 3–0 win for Tre Fiori.)	0–1

== Final ==
24 May 2025
20:45

Virtus	1–0	Tre Fiori
Tortori 18'	Report

San Marino Stadium, Serravalle
Referee: Antonio Ucini

== See also ==
- 2024–25 Campionato Sammarinese di Calcio
