= 2013–14 UEFA Champions League =

European football tournament

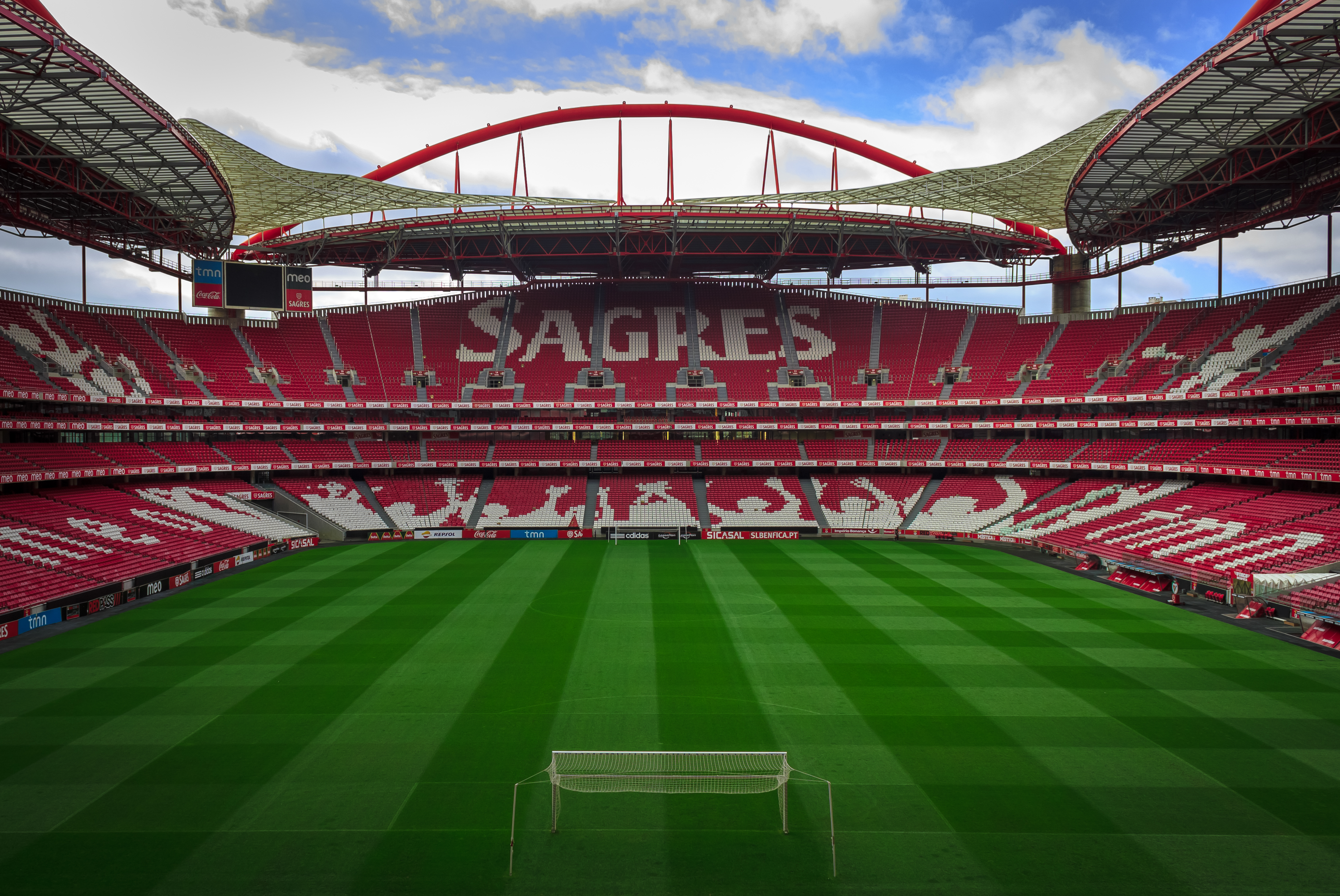
- The Estádio da Luz in Lisbon hosted the final

Tournament details
- Dates: Qualifying: 2 July – 28 August 2013; Competition proper: 17 September 2013 – 24 May 2014
- Teams: Competition proper: 32; Total: 76 (from 52 associations)

Final positions
- Champions: (Spain) Real Madrid (10th title)
- Runners-up: (Spain) Atlético Madrid

Tournament statistics
- Matches played: 125
- Goals scored: 362 (2.9 per match)
- Attendance: 5,712,646 (45,701 per match)
- Top scorer(s): Cristiano Ronaldo (Real Madrid); 17 goals

The 2013–14 UEFA Champions League was the 59th season of Europe's premier club football tournament organised by UEFA, and the 22nd season since it was renamed from the European Champion Clubs' Cup to the UEFA Champions League.

The final was played between Real Madrid and Atlético Madrid at the Estádio da Luz in Lisbon, Portugal, marking it the fifth final to feature two teams from the same association (after the finals of 2000, 2003, 2008, and 2013) and the first time in tournament history that both finalists were from the same city. Real Madrid, who eliminated the title holders, Bayern Munich, in the semi-finals, won in extra time, giving them a record-extending 10th title in the competition. Real equalized late in the second half through Sergio Ramos and then pulled away during extra time to win 4–1.

For the first time, the clubs who qualified for the group stage also qualified for the newly formed 2013–14 UEFA Youth League, a competition available to players aged 19 or under.

== Association team allocation ==
A total of 76 teams from 52 of the 54 UEFA member associations participated in the 2013–14 UEFA Champions League (the exceptions being Liechtenstein, which do not organise a domestic league, and Gibraltar, which started participating in the 2014–15 season after being admitted as a UEFA member in May 2013). The association ranking based on the UEFA country coefficients was used to determine the number of participating teams for each association:

- Associations 1–3 each have four teams qualify.
- Associations 4–6 each have three teams qualify.
- Associations 7–15 each have two teams qualify.
- Associations 16–53 (except Liechtenstein) each have one team qualify.

The winners of the 2012–13 UEFA Champions League were given an additional entry as title holders if they would not qualify for the 2013–14 UEFA Champions League through their domestic league (because of the restriction that no association can have more than four teams playing in the Champions League, if the title holders are from the top three associations and finish outside the top four in their domestic league, the title holders' entry comes at the expense of the fourth-placed team of their association). However, this additional entry was not necessary for this season since the title holders qualified for the tournament through their domestic league.

=== Association ranking ===
For the 2013–14 UEFA Champions League, the associations were allocated places according to their 2012 UEFA country coefficients, which took into account their performance in European competitions from 2007–08 to 2011–12.

Rank	Association	Coeff.	Teams
1	England	84.410	4
2	Spain	84.186	4
3	Germany	75.186	4
4	Italy	59.981	3
5	Portugal	55.346	3
6	France	54.178	3
7	Russia	47.832	2
8	Netherlands	45.515	2
9	Ukraine	45.133	2
10	Greece	37.100	2
11	Turkey	34.050	2
12	Belgium	32.400	2
13	Denmark	27.525	2
14	Switzerland	26.800	2
15	Austria	26.325	2
16	Cyprus	25.499	1
17	Israel	22.000	1
18	Scotland	21.141	1

Rank	Association	Coeff.	Teams
19	Czech Republic	20.350	1
20	Poland	19.916	1
21	Croatia	18.874	1
22	Romania	18.824	1
23	Belarus	18.208	1
24	Sweden	15.900	1
25	Slovakia	14.874	1
26	Norway	14.675	1
27	Serbia	14.250	1
28	Bulgaria	14.250	1
29	Hungary	9.750	1
30	Finland	9.133	1
31	Georgia	8.666	1
32	Bosnia and Herzegovina	8.416	1
33	Republic of Ireland	7.375	1
34	Slovenia	7.124	1
35	Lithuania	6.875	1
36	Moldova	6.749	1

Rank	Association	Coeff.	Teams
37	Azerbaijan	6.207	1
38	Latvia	5.874	1
39	Macedonia	5.666	1
40	Kazakhstan	5.333	1
41	Iceland	5.332	1
42	Montenegro	4.375	1
43	Liechtenstein	4.000	0
44	Albania	3.916	1
45	Malta	3.083	1
46	Wales	2.749	1
47	Estonia	2.666	1
48	Northern Ireland	2.583	1
49	Luxembourg	2.333	1
50	Armenia	2.208	1
51	Faroe Islands	1.416	1
52	Andorra	1.000	1
53	San Marino	0.916	1
54	Gibraltar	0.000	0

=== Distribution ===
Since the title holders (Bayern Munich) qualified for the Champions League group stage through their domestic league, the group stage spot reserved for the title holders is vacated, and the following changes to the default allocation system are made:

- The champions of association 13 (Denmark) are promoted from the third qualifying round to the group stage.
- The champions of association 16 (Cyprus) are promoted from the second qualifying round to the third qualifying round.
- The champions of associations 48 (Northern Ireland) and 49 (Luxembourg) are promoted from the first qualifying round to the second qualifying round.

		Teams entering in this round	Teams advancing from previous round
First qualifying round (4 teams)		4 champions from associations 50–53	
Second qualifying round (34 teams)		32 champions from associations 17–49 (except Liechtenstein)	2 winners from the first qualifying round
Third qualifying round	Champions (20 teams)	3 champions from associations 14–16	17 winners from the second qualifying round
Third qualifying round	Non-champions (10 teams)	9 runners-up from associations 7–15; 1 third-placed team from association 6	
Play-off round	Champions (10 teams)		10 winners from the third qualifying round for champions
Play-off round	Non-champions (10 teams)	2 third-placed teams from associations 4–5; 3 fourth-placed teams from associations 1–3	5 winners from the third qualifying round for non-champions
Group stage (32 teams)		13 champions from associations 1–13; 6 runners-up from associations 1–6; 3 third-placed teams from associations 1–3	5 winners from the play-off round for champions; 5 winners from the play-off round for non-champions
Knockout phase (16 teams)			8 group winners from the group stage; 8 group runners-up from the group stage

=== Teams ===
League positions of the previous season shown in parentheses (TH: Title holders).

Group stage
(Germany) Bayern Munich (1st)^{TH}	(Spain) Atlético Madrid (3rd)	(Portugal) Benfica (2nd)	(Ukraine) Shakhtar Donetsk (1st)
(England) Manchester United (1st)	(Germany) Borussia Dortmund (2nd)	(France) Paris Saint-Germain (1st)	(Greece) Olympiacos (1st)
(England) Manchester City (2nd)	(Germany) Bayer Leverkusen (3rd)	(France) Marseille (2nd)	(Turkey) Galatasaray (1st)
(England) Chelsea (3rd)	(Italy) Juventus (1st)	(Russia) CSKA Moscow (1st)	(Belgium) Anderlecht (1st)
(Spain) Barcelona (1st)	(Italy) Napoli (2nd)	(Netherlands) Ajax (1st)	(Denmark) Copenhagen (1st)
(Spain) Real Madrid (2nd)	(Portugal) Porto (1st)		
Play-off round
Champions	Non-champions		
	(England) Arsenal (4th)	(Germany) Schalke 04 (4th)	(Portugal) Paços de Ferreira (3rd)
	(Spain) Real Sociedad (4th)	(Italy) Milan (3rd)	
Third qualifying round
Champions	Non-champions		
(Switzerland) Basel (1st)	(France) Lyon (3rd)	(Greece) PAOK (2nd)	(Denmark) Nordsjælland (2nd)
Austria Wien (1st)	(Russia) Zenit Saint Petersburg (2nd)	(Turkey) Fenerbahçe (2nd)	(Switzerland) Grasshopper (2nd)
(Cyprus) APOEL (1st)	(Netherlands) PSV Eindhoven (2nd)	(Belgium) Zulte Waregem (2nd)	(Austria) Red Bull Salzburg (2nd)
	(Ukraine) ~~Metalist Kharkiv~~ (2nd)		
Second qualifying round
(Israel) Maccabi Tel Aviv (1st)	(Slovakia) Slovan Bratislava (1st)	(Republic of Ireland) Sligo Rovers (1st)	(Iceland) FH (1st)
(Scotland) Celtic (1st)	(Norway) Molde (1st)	(Slovenia) Maribor (1st)	(Montenegro) Sutjeska (1st)
(Czech Republic) Viktoria Plzeň (1st)	(Serbia) Partizan (1st)	(Lithuania) Ekranas (1st)	(Albania) Skënderbeu (1st)
(Poland) Legia Warsaw (1st)	(Bulgaria) Ludogorets Razgrad (1st)	(Moldova) Sheriff Tiraspol (1st)	(Malta) Birkirkara (1st)
(Croatia) Dinamo Zagreb (1st)	(Hungary) Győri ETO (1st)	(Azerbaijan) Neftçi (1st)	(Wales) The New Saints (1st)
(Romania) Steaua București (1st)	(Finland) HJK (1st)	(Latvia) Daugava Daugavpils (1st)	(Estonia) Nõmme Kalju (1st)
(Belarus) BATE Borisov (1st)	(Georgia (country)) Dinamo Tbilisi (1st)	(North Macedonia) Vardar (1st)	(Northern Ireland) Cliftonville (1st)
(Sweden) IF Elfsborg (1st)	(Bosnia and Herzegovina) Željezničar (1st)	(Kazakhstan) Shakhter Karagandy (1st)	(Luxembourg) Fola Esch (1st)
First qualifying round
(Armenia) Shirak (1st)	(Faroe Islands) EB/Streymur (1st)	(Andorra) Lusitanos (1st)	(San Marino) Tre Penne (1st)

Notes

1. Turkey (TUR): On 25 June 2013, Fenerbahçe were banned by UEFA from the 2013–14 UEFA club competitions because of the 2011 Turkish sports corruption scandal. They appealed the ban to the Court of Arbitration for Sport, and on 18 July 2013 it was ruled that the ban should be temporarily lifted and they should be included in the qualifying round draws of the Champions League, until the final decision to be made before the end of August 2013. Fenerbahçe competed in the Champions League qualifying rounds and lost in the play-off round. On 28 August 2013, the Court of Arbitration for Sport upheld UEFA's ban, meaning Fenerbahçe were banned from the 2013–14 UEFA Europa League.
2. Ukraine (UKR): On 14 August 2013, Metalist Kharkiv were disqualified from the 2013–14 UEFA club competitions because of previous match-fixing. UEFA decided to replace Metalist Kharkiv in the Champions League play-off round with PAOK, who were eliminated by Metalist Kharkiv in the third qualifying round. Metalist Kharkiv made two urgent requests to the Court of Arbitration for Sport for temporary reinstatement until a final decision is reached, but both requests were rejected. On 28 August 2013, the Court of Arbitration for Sport upheld UEFA's ban.

== Round and draw dates ==
The schedule of the competition was as follows (all draws held at UEFA headquarters in Nyon, Switzerland, unless stated otherwise).

Phase	Round	Draw date	First leg	Second leg
Qualifying	First qualifying round	24 June 2013	2–3 July 2013	9–10 July 2013
Qualifying	Second qualifying round	24 June 2013	16–17 July 2013	23–24 July 2013
Qualifying	Third qualifying round	19 July 2013	30–31 July 2013	6–7 August 2013
Play-off	Play-off round	9 August 2013	20–21 August 2013	27–28 August 2013
Group stage	Matchday 1	29 August 2013 (Monaco)	17–18 September 2013	
Group stage	Matchday 2	29 August 2013 (Monaco)	1–2 October 2013	
Group stage	Matchday 3	29 August 2013 (Monaco)	22–23 October 2013	
Group stage	Matchday 4	29 August 2013 (Monaco)	5–6 November 2013	
Group stage	Matchday 5	29 August 2013 (Monaco)	26–27 November 2013	
Group stage	Matchday 6	29 August 2013 (Monaco)	10–11 December 2013	
Knockout phase	Round of 16	16 December 2013	18–19 & 25–26 February 2014	11–12 & 18–19 March 2014
Knockout phase	Quarter-finals	21 March 2014	1–2 April 2014	8–9 April 2014
Knockout phase	Semi-finals	11 April 2014	22–23 April 2014	29–30 April 2014
Knockout phase	Final	11 April 2014	24 May 2014 at Estádio da Luz, Lisbon	

== Qualifying rounds ==
In the qualifying rounds and the play-off round, teams were divided into seeded and unseeded teams based on their 2013 UEFA club coefficients, and then drawn into two-legged home-and-away ties. Teams from the same association could not be drawn against each other.

=== First qualifying round ===
The draws for the first and second qualifying rounds were held on 24 June 2013. The first legs were played on 2 July, and the second legs were played on 9 July 2013.

Team 1	Agg.	Team 2	1st leg	2nd leg
Shirak (Armenia)	3–1	(San Marino) Tre Penne	3–0	0–1
Lusitanos (Andorra)	3–7	(Faroe Islands) EB/Streymur	2–2	1–5

=== Second qualifying round ===
The first legs were played on 16 and 17 July, and the second legs were played on 23 and 24 July 2013.

Team 1	Agg.	Team 2	1st leg	2nd leg
Neftçi (Azerbaijan)	0–1	(Albania) Skënderbeu	0–0	0–1 (a.e.t.)
Steaua București (Romania)	5–1	(North Macedonia) Vardar	3–0	2–1
Viktoria Plzeň (Czech Republic)	6–4	(Bosnia and Herzegovina) Željezničar	4–3	2–1
Sheriff Tiraspol (Moldova)	6–1	(Montenegro) Sutjeska	1–1	5–0
Birkirkara (Malta)	0–2	(Slovenia) Maribor	0–0	0–2
Sligo Rovers (Republic of Ireland)	0–3	(Norway) Molde	0–1	0–2
IF Elfsborg (Sweden)	11–1	(Latvia) Daugava Daugavpils	7–1	4–0
HJK (Finland)	1–2	(Estonia) Nõmme Kalju	0–0	1–2
Ekranas (Lithuania)	1–3	(Iceland) FH	0–1	1–2
The New Saints (Wales)	1–4	(Poland) Legia Warsaw	1–3	0–1
Cliftonville (Northern Ireland)	0–5 (Note: Order of legs reversed after original draw.)	(Scotland) Celtic	0–3	0–2
Fola Esch (Luxembourg)	0–6	(Croatia) Dinamo Zagreb	0–5	0–1
Győri ETO (Hungary)	1–4	(Israel) Maccabi Tel Aviv	0–2	1–2
BATE Borisov (Belarus)	0–2	(Kazakhstan) Shakhter Karagandy	0–1	0–1
Shirak (Armenia)	1–1 (a)	(Serbia) Partizan	1–1	0–0
Slovan Bratislava (Slovakia)	2–4	(Bulgaria) Ludogorets Razgrad	2–1	0–3
Dinamo Tbilisi (Georgia (country))	9–2	(Faroe Islands) EB/Streymur	6–1	3–1

=== Third qualifying round ===
The third qualifying round was split into two separate sections: one for champions and one for non-champions. The losing teams in both sections entered the 2013–14 UEFA Europa League play-off round.

Team 1	Agg.	Team 2	1st leg	2nd leg
Champions Route
Basel (Switzerland)	4–3	(Israel) Maccabi Tel Aviv	1–0	3–3
Molde (Norway)	1–1 (a)	(Poland) Legia Warsaw	1–1	0–0
Ludogorets Razgrad (Bulgaria)	3–1	(Serbia) Partizan	2–1	1–0
Dinamo Tbilisi (Georgia (country))	1–3	(Romania) Steaua București	0–2	1–1
APOEL (Cyprus)	1–1 (a)	(Slovenia) Maribor	1–1	0–0
Celtic (Scotland)	1–0	(Sweden) IF Elfsborg	1–0	0–0
Shakhter Karagandy (Kazakhstan)	5–3	(Albania) Skënderbeu	3–0	2–3
Austria Wien	1–0	(Iceland) FH	1–0	0–0
Nõmme Kalju (Estonia)	2–10	(Czech Republic) Viktoria Plzeň	0–4	2–6
Dinamo Zagreb (Croatia)	4–0	(Moldova) Sheriff Tiraspol	1–0	3–0
League Route
Nordsjælland (Denmark)	0–6	(Russia) Zenit Saint Petersburg	0–1	0–5
Red Bull Salzburg (Austria)	2–4	(Turkey) Fenerbahçe	1–1	1–3
PAOK (Greece)	1–3	(Ukraine) Metalist Kharkiv	0–2	1–1
PSV Eindhoven (Netherlands)	5–0	(Belgium) Zulte Waregem	2–0	3–0
Lyon (France)	2–0	(Switzerland) Grasshopper	1–0	1–0

== Play-off round ==
The play-off round was split into two separate sections: one for champions and one for non-champions. The losing teams in both sections entered the 2013–14 UEFA Europa League group stage.

The draw for the play-off round was held on 9 August 2013. The first legs were played on 20 and 21 August, and the second legs were played on 27 and 28 August 2013.

On 14 August 2013, Metalist Kharkiv were disqualified from the 2013–14 UEFA club competitions because of previous match-fixing. UEFA decided to replace Metalist Kharkiv in the Champions League play-off round with PAOK, who were eliminated by Metalist Kharkiv in the third qualifying round.

Red Bull Salzburg lodged a protest after being defeated by Fenerbahçe in the third qualifying round, but it was rejected by UEFA and the Court of Arbitration for Sport.

Team 1	Agg.	Team 2	1st leg	2nd leg
Champions Route
Dinamo Zagreb (Croatia)	3–4	Austria Wien	0–2	3–2
Ludogorets Razgrad (Bulgaria)	2–6	(Switzerland) Basel	2–4	0–2
Viktoria Plzeň (Czech Republic)	4–1	(Slovenia) Maribor	3–1	1–0
Shakhter Karagandy (Kazakhstan)	2–3	(Scotland) Celtic	2–0	0–3
Steaua București (Romania)	3–3 (a)	(Poland) Legia Warsaw	1–1	2–2
League Route
Lyon (France)	0–4	(Spain) Real Sociedad	0–2	0–2
Schalke 04 (Germany)	4–3	(Greece) PAOK	1–1	3–2
Paços de Ferreira (Portugal)	3–8	(Russia) Zenit Saint Petersburg	1–4	2–4
PSV Eindhoven (Netherlands)	1–4	(Italy) Milan	1–1	0–3
Fenerbahçe (Turkey)	0–5	(England) Arsenal	0–3	0–2

== Group stage ==
Location of teams of the 2013–14 UEFA Champions League group stage.
Brown: Group A; Red: Group B; Orange: Group C; Yellow: Group D;
Green: Group E; Blue: Group F; Purple: Group G; Pink: Group H.

The draw for the group stage was held in Monaco on 29 August 2013. The 32 teams were allocated into four pots based on their 2013 UEFA club coefficients, with the title holders, Bayern Munich, being placed in Pot 1 automatically. They were drawn into eight groups of four, with the restriction that teams from the same association could not be drawn against each other.

In each group, teams played against each other home-and-away in a round-robin format. The matchdays were 17–18 September, 1–2 October, 22–23 October, 5–6 November, 26–27 November, and 10–11 December 2013. The group winners and runners-up advanced to the round of 16, while the third-placed teams entered the 2013–14 UEFA Europa League round of 32.

A total of 18 national associations were represented in the group stage. Austria Wien made their debut appearance in the group stage.

Teams that qualify for the group stage also participate in the newly formed 2013–14 UEFA Youth League, a competition available to players aged 19 or under.

=== Group A ===
Pos	Team	Pld	W	D	L	GF	GA	GD	Pts	Qualification	MUN	LEV	SHK	RSO
1	(England) Manchester United	6	4	2	0	12	3	+9	14	Advance to knockout phase	—	4–2	1–0	1–0
2	(Germany) Bayer Leverkusen	6	3	1	2	9	10	−1	10	Advance to knockout phase	0–5	—	4–0	2–1
3	(Ukraine) Shakhtar Donetsk	6	2	2	2	7	6	+1	8	Transfer to Europa League	1–1	0–0	—	4–0
4	(Spain) Real Sociedad	6	0	1	5	1	10	−9	1		0–0	0–1	0–2	—

Source: UEFA

=== Group B ===
Pos	Team	Pld	W	D	L	GF	GA	GD	Pts	Qualification	RMA	GAL	JUV	CPH
1	(Spain) Real Madrid	6	5	1	0	20	5	+15	16	Advance to knockout phase	—	4–1	2–1	4–0
2	(Turkey) Galatasaray	6	2	1	3	8	14	−6	7	Advance to knockout phase	1–6	—	1–0	3–1
3	(Italy) Juventus	6	1	3	2	9	9	0	6	Transfer to Europa League	2–2	2–2	—	3–1
4	(Denmark) Copenhagen	6	1	1	4	4	13	−9	4		0–2	1–0	1–1	—

Source: UEFA

=== Group C ===
Pos	Team	Pld	W	D	L	GF	GA	GD	Pts	Qualification	PAR	OLY	BEN	AND
1	(France) Paris Saint-Germain	6	4	1	1	16	5	+11	13	Advance to knockout phase	—	2–1	3–0	1–1
2	(Greece) Olympiacos	6	3	1	2	10	8	+2	10 (Note: Head-to-head points: Olympiacos 4, Benfica 1.)	Advance to knockout phase	1–4	—	1–0	3–1
3	(Portugal) Benfica	6	3	1	2	8	8	0	10	Transfer to Europa League	2–1	1–1	—	2–0
4	(Belgium) Anderlecht	6	0	1	5	4	17	−13	1		0–5	0–3	2–3	—

Source: UEFA

=== Group D ===
Pos	Team	Pld	W	D	L	GF	GA	GD	Pts	Qualification	BAY	MCI	PLZ	CSKA
1	(Germany) Bayern Munich	6	5	0	1	17	5	+12	15 (Note: Tied on head-to-head points (3). Head-to-head goal difference: Bayern Munich +1, Manchester City −1.)	Advance to knockout phase	—	2–3	5–0	3–0
2	(England) Manchester City	6	5	0	1	18	10	+8	15	Advance to knockout phase	1–3	—	4–2	5–2
3	(Czech Republic) Viktoria Plzeň	6	1	0	5	6	17	−11	3 (Note: Tied on head-to-head points (3) and head-to-head goal difference (0). Head-to-head away goals: Viktoria Plzeň 2, CSKA Moscow 1.)	Transfer to Europa League	0–1	0–3	—	2–1
4	(Russia) CSKA Moscow	6	1	0	5	8	17	−9	3		1–3	1–2	3–2	—

Source: UEFA

=== Group E ===
Pos	Team	Pld	W	D	L	GF	GA	GD	Pts	Qualification	CHE	SCH	BSL	STE
1	(England) Chelsea	6	4	0	2	12	3	+9	12	Advance to knockout phase	—	3–0	1–2	1–0
2	(Germany) Schalke 04	6	3	1	2	6	6	0	10	Advance to knockout phase	0–3	—	2–0	3–0
3	(Switzerland) Basel	6	2	2	2	5	6	−1	8	Transfer to Europa League	1–0	0–1	—	1–1
4	(Romania) Steaua București	6	0	3	3	2	10	−8	3		0–4	0–0	1–1	—

Source: UEFA

=== Group F ===
Pos	Team	Pld	W	D	L	GF	GA	GD	Pts	Qualification	DOR	ARS	NAP	MAR
1	(Germany) Borussia Dortmund	6	4	0	2	11	6	+5	12 (Note: Tied on head-to-head points (6). Head-to-head goal difference: Borussia Dortmund +1, Arsenal 0, Napoli −1.)	Advance to knockout phase	—	0–1	3–1	3–0
2	(England) Arsenal	6	4	0	2	8	5	+3	12	Advance to knockout phase	1–2	—	2–0	2–0
3	(Italy) Napoli	6	4	0	2	10	9	+1	12	Transfer to Europa League	2–1	2–0	—	3–2
4	(France) Marseille	6	0	0	6	5	14	−9	0		1–2	1–2	1–2	—

Source: UEFA

=== Group G ===
Pos	Team	Pld	W	D	L	GF	GA	GD	Pts	Qualification	ATM	ZEN	POR	AWI
1	(Spain) Atlético Madrid	6	5	1	0	15	3	+12	16	Advance to knockout phase	—	3–1	2–0	4–0
2	(Russia) Zenit Saint Petersburg	6	1	3	2	5	9	−4	6	Advance to knockout phase	1–1	—	1–1	0–0
3	(Portugal) Porto	6	1	2	3	4	7	−3	5 (Note: Head-to-head points: Porto 4, Austria Wien 1.)	Transfer to Europa League	1–2	0–1	—	1–1
4	Austria Wien	6	1	2	3	5	10	−5	5		0–3	4–1	0–1	—

Source: UEFA

=== Group H ===
Pos	Team	Pld	W	D	L	GF	GA	GD	Pts	Qualification	BAR	MIL	AJX	CEL
1	(Spain) Barcelona	6	4	1	1	16	5	+11	13	Advance to knockout phase	—	3–1	4–0	6–1
2	(Italy) Milan	6	2	3	1	8	5	+3	9	Advance to knockout phase	1–1	—	0–0	2–0
3	(Netherlands) Ajax	6	2	2	2	5	8	−3	8	Transfer to Europa League	2–1	1–1	—	1–0
4	(Scotland) Celtic	6	1	0	5	3	14	−11	3		0–1	0–3	2–1	—

Source: UEFA

== Knockout phase ==
In the knockout phase, teams played against each other over two legs on a home-and-away basis, except for the one-match final. The mechanism of the draws for each round was as follows:

- In the draw for the round of 16, the eight group winners were seeded, and the eight group runners-up were unseeded. The seeded teams were drawn against the unseeded teams, with the seeded teams hosting the second leg. Teams from the same group or the same association could not be drawn against each other.
- In the draws for the quarter-finals onwards, there were no seedings, and teams from the same group or the same association could be drawn against each other.

=== Bracket ===
Round of 16
(Germany) Schalke 04	1	1	2
(Spain) Real Madrid	6	3	9
(Russia) Zenit Saint Petersburg	2	2	4
(Germany) Borussia Dortmund	4	1	5
(Greece) Olympiacos	2	0	2
(England) Manchester United	0	3	3
(England) Arsenal	0	1	1
(Germany) Bayern Munich	2	1	3
(England) Manchester City	0	1	1
(Spain) Barcelona	2	2	4
(Italy) Milan	0	1	1
(Spain) Atlético Madrid	1	4	5
(Germany) Bayer Leverkusen	0	1	1
(France) Paris Saint-Germain	4	2	6
(Turkey) Galatasaray	1	0	1
(England) Chelsea	1	2	3

Quarter-finals
(Spain) Real Madrid	3	0	3
(Germany) Borussia Dortmund	0	2	2
(England) Manchester United	1	1	2
(Germany) Bayern Munich	1	3	4
(Spain) Barcelona	1	0	1
(Spain) Atlético Madrid	1	1	2
(France) Paris Saint-Germain	3	0	3
(England) Chelsea (a)	1	2	3

Semi-finals
(Spain) Real Madrid	1	4	5
(Germany) Bayern Munich	0	0	0
(Spain) Atlético Madrid	0	3	3
(England) Chelsea	0	1	1

Final
24 May – Lisbon
(Spain) Real Madrid (a.e.t.)	4
(Spain) Atlético Madrid	1

=== Round of 16 ===
The draw for the round of 16 was held on 16 December 2013. The first legs were played on 18, 19, 25 and 26 February, and the second legs were played on 11, 12, 18 and 19 March 2014.

Team 1	Agg.	Team 2	1st leg	2nd leg
Manchester City (England)	1–4	(Spain) Barcelona	0–2	1–2
Olympiacos (Greece)	2–3	(England) Manchester United	2–0	0–3
Milan (Italy)	1–5	(Spain) Atlético Madrid	0–1	1–4
Bayer Leverkusen (Germany)	1–6	(France) Paris Saint-Germain	0–4	1–2
Galatasaray (Turkey)	1–3	(England) Chelsea	1–1	0–2
Schalke 04 (Germany)	2–9	(Spain) Real Madrid	1–6	1–3
Zenit Saint Petersburg (Russia)	4–5	(Germany) Borussia Dortmund	2–4	2–1
Arsenal (England)	1–3	(Germany) Bayern Munich	0–2	1–1

=== Quarter-finals ===
The draw for the quarter-finals was held on 21 March 2014. The first legs were played on 1 and 2 April, and the second legs were played on 8 and 9 April 2014.

Team 1	Agg.	Team 2	1st leg	2nd leg
Barcelona (Spain)	1–2	(Spain) Atlético Madrid	1–1	0–1
Real Madrid (Spain)	3–2	(Germany) Borussia Dortmund	3–0	0–2
Paris Saint-Germain (France)	3–3 (a)	(England) Chelsea	3–1	0–2
Manchester United (England)	2–4	(Germany) Bayern Munich	1–1	1–3

=== Semi-finals ===
The draw for the semi-finals was held on 11 April 2014. The first legs were played on 22 and 23 April, and the second legs were played on 29 and 30 April 2014.

Team 1	Agg.	Team 2	1st leg	2nd leg
Real Madrid (Spain)	5–0	(Germany) Bayern Munich	1–0	4–0
Atlético Madrid (Spain)	3–1	(England) Chelsea	0–0	3–1

=== Final ===
The final was played on 24 May 2014 at the Estádio da Luz in Lisbon, Portugal. A draw was held on 11 April 2014, after the semi-final draw, to determine the "home" team for administrative purposes.

24 May 2014
19:45 UTC+1

Real Madrid (Spain)	4–1 (a.e.t.)	(Spain) Atlético Madrid
Ramos 90+3'; Bale 110'; Marcelo 118'; Ronaldo 120' (pen.)	Report	Godín 36'

Estádio da Luz, Lisbon
Attendance: 60,976
Referee: Björn Kuipers (Netherlands)

== Statistics ==
Statistics exclude qualifying rounds and play-off round.

=== Top goalscorers ===
Rank	Player	Team	Goals	Minutes played
1	(Portugal) Cristiano Ronaldo	(Spain) Real Madrid	17	993
2	(Sweden) Zlatan Ibrahimović	(France) Paris Saint-Germain	10	670
3	(Spain) Diego Costa	(Spain) Atlético Madrid	8	580
3	(Argentina) Lionel Messi	(Spain) Barcelona	8	630
5	(Argentina) Sergio Agüero	(England) Manchester City	6	429
5	(Poland) Robert Lewandowski	(Germany) Borussia Dortmund	6	809
5	(Wales) Gareth Bale	(Spain) Real Madrid	6	873
8	(Spain) Álvaro Negredo	(England) Manchester City	5	326
8	(Chile) Arturo Vidal	(Italy) Juventus	5	533
8	(Germany) Thomas Müller	(Germany) Bayern Munich	5	708
8	(Germany) Marco Reus	(Germany) Borussia Dortmund	5	769
8	(France) Karim Benzema	(Spain) Real Madrid	5	913

=== Squad of the Season ===
The UEFA technical study group selected the following 18 players as the squad of the tournament:

Pos.	Player	Team
GK	(Belgium) Thibaut Courtois	(Spain) Atlético Madrid
GK	(Germany) Manuel Neuer	(Germany) Bayern Munich
DF	(Uruguay) Diego Godín	(Spain) Atlético Madrid
DF	(Germany) Philipp Lahm	(Germany) Bayern Munich
DF	(Spain) Dani Carvajal	(Spain) Real Madrid
DF	(Portugal) Pepe	(Spain) Real Madrid
DF	(Spain) Sergio Ramos	(Spain) Real Madrid
MF	(Spain) Gabi	(Spain) Atlético Madrid
MF	(Spain) Andrés Iniesta	(Spain) Barcelona
MF	(Germany) Toni Kroos	(Germany) Bayern Munich
MF	(Argentina) Ángel Di María	(Spain) Real Madrid
MF	(Croatia) Luka Modrić	(Spain) Real Madrid
MF	(Spain) Xabi Alonso	(Spain) Real Madrid
FW	(Germany) Marco Reus	(Germany) Borussia Dortmund
FW	(Spain) Diego Costa	(Spain) Atlético Madrid
FW	(Netherlands) Arjen Robben	(Germany) Bayern Munich
FW	(Sweden) Zlatan Ibrahimović	(France) Paris Saint-Germain
FW	(Portugal) Cristiano Ronaldo	(Spain) Real Madrid

== See also ==
- 2013–14 UEFA Europa League
- 2013–14 UEFA Youth League
- 2014 UEFA Super Cup
- 2014 FIFA Club World Cup
- 2013–14 UEFA Women's Champions League
