= 2024–25 Campionato Sammarinese di Calcio =

San Marino football competition

Campionato Sammarinese di Calcio
- Season: 2024–25
- Dates: 30 August 2024 – 17 May 2025
- Champions: Virtus
- Champions League: Virtus
- Conference League: La Fiorita; Tre Fiori
- Matches: 176
- Goals: 491 (2.79 per match)
- Top goalscorer: Mohamed Ben Kacem (13 goals)
- Biggest home win: Tre Fiori 7–0 Cailungo (15 December 2024); Cailungo 7–0 Pennarossa; 18 April 2025
- Biggest away win: Cailungo 0–7 Virtus (23 November 2024)
- Highest scoring: La Fiorita 7–1 Faetano (22 September 2024)
- Longest winning run: Cosmos (5 matches)
- Longest unbeaten run: La Fiorita (10 matches)
- Longest winless run: Juvenes/Dogana (8 matches)
- Longest losing run: Cailungo (4 matches)
- All statistics correct as of 23 February 2025.

The 2024–25 Campionato Sammarinese di Calcio was the 40th season of league competition in San Marino, in which the country's 15 amateur football teams and the San Marino Academy U22 compete. The season began on 30 August 2024 and concluded on 17 May 2025.

The winners (Virtus) qualified for the 2025–26 UEFA Champions League first qualifying round. The Conference League play-off winner (La Fiorita) qualified for the 2025–26 UEFA Conference League first qualifying round. As Virtus also won the Coppa Titano, the second Conference League berth passed down to the highest team not already qualified for European football (Tre Fiori).

== Participating teams ==
Locations of the 2024–25 Campionato Sammarinese di Calcio teams

Club	Location
Cailungo	Cailungo
Cosmos	Serravalle
Domagnano	Domagnano
Faetano	Faetano
Fiorentino	Fiorentino
Folgore	Falciano
Juvenes/Dogana	Dogana
La Fiorita	Montegiardino
Libertas	Borgo Maggiore
Murata	Murata
Pennarossa	Chiesanuova
San Marino; Academy U22	San Marino
San Giovanni	San Giovanni sotto le Penne
Tre Fiori	Fiorentino
Tre Penne	San Marino
Virtus	Acquaviva

== First phase ==
=== League table ===
Pos	Team	Pld	W	D	L	GF	GA	GD	Pts	Qualification
1	Virtus (C)	30	24	5	1	66	18	+48	77	Qualification to Champions League first qualifying round
2	La Fiorita (O)	30	22	7	1	74	19	+55	73	Qualification to Conference League play-off quarter-finals
3	Tre Fiori	30	17	5	8	61	28	+33	56	Qualification to Conference League play-off quarter-finals and Conference League first qualifying round (Note: Since the winners of the 2024–25 Coppa Titano, Virtus, qualified for the Champions League via league position, the spot reserved for the Coppa Titano winners (Conference League first qualifying round) was passed to the next best-ranked team that hasn't qualified for any UEFA competitions.)
4	Folgore	30	15	8	7	41	31	+10	53	Qualification to Conference League play-off quarter-finals
5	Cosmos	30	14	8	8	61	36	+25	50	Qualification to Conference League play-off quarter-finals
6	Tre Penne	30	12	13	5	48	33	+15	49	Qualification to Conference League play-off quarter-finals
7	San Giovanni	30	13	10	7	58	37	+21	49	Qualification to Conference League play-off quarter-finals
8	Fiorentino	30	13	6	11	33	34	−1	45	Qualification to Conference League play-off first round
9	Murata	30	11	6	13	33	33	0	39	Qualification to Conference League play-off first round
10	Faetano	30	9	4	17	32	62	−30	31	Qualification to Conference League play-off first round
11	Juvenes/Dogana	30	8	6	16	24	35	−11	30	Qualification to Conference League play-off first round
12	Domagnano	30	6	11	13	29	44	−15	29	
13	Libertas	30	6	8	16	29	60	−31	26	
14	Cailungo	30	6	5	19	35	66	−31	23	
15	Pennarossa	30	3	8	19	26	76	−50	17	
16	San Marino Academy U22	30	4	4	22	30	68	−38	16	

Source: Flashscore
Rules for classification: 1) Points; 2) Head-to-head points; 3) head-to-head goal difference; 4) Head-to-head goals scored; 5)Goal difference; 6) Goals scored.
(C) Champions; (O) Play-off winners

=== Results ===
Home \ Away	CAI	COS	DOM	FAE	FTO	FOL	JUV	LFI	LIB	MUR	PEN	SGI	SMA	TFI	TPE	VIR
Cailungo		0–5	0–1	0–1	2–0	1–3	1–2	0–3	2–2	1–0	7–0	0–3	4–1	1–2	2–2	0–7
Cosmos	2–2		3–0	2–0	1–2	1–1	0–0	0–3	2–2	0–1	4–0	1–2	4–2	2–2	1–1	2–3
Domagnano	3–1	0–0		2–3	0–3	0–1	1–1	0–2	3–0	0–0	2–4	1–1	2–1	1–0	0–0	1–2
Faetano	0–1	0–2	1–1		2–3	0–2	1–0	0–4	3–1	1–0	2–1	3–3	3–2	1–3	0–4	0–2
Fiorentino	1–0	0–3	2–0	1–0		1–1	0–0	0–3	1–2	1–0	4–0	0–2	2–1	1–1	0–0	0–4
Folgore	3–0	1–1	0–4	1–1	2–2		1–0	1–1	3–0	1–0	2–2	2–1	2–0	1–2	1–1	0–2
Juvenes/Dogana	2–0	1–3	0–0	2–1	0–0	0–1		3–1	1–1	0–1	1–0	2–3	0–1	0–1	1–2	0–2
La Fiorita	4–2	2–2	3–0	7–1	2–1	2–0	3–1		6–0	2–0	3–0	2–1	4–1	0–0	2–0	0–0
Libertas	0–0	0–4	1–0	2–4	1–3	0–1	0–1	1–1		1–0	2–2	2–3	3–1	2–1	0–2	0–2
Murata	2–1	2–0	3–3	2–2	1–0	0–1	1–0	0–3	1–0		3–0	1–1	4–1	0–2	2–4	0–1
Pennarossa	0–4	2–3	1–1	2–0	1–0	0–3	0–2	1–2	1–1	0–4		0–5	1–3	1–6	0–0	3–3
San Giovanni	5–1	2–0	2–2	2–0	0–1	3–1	3–0	1–2	2–1	0–0	2–2		1–1	0–2	1–1	0–2
Academy U22	1–1	3–2	0–0	0–1	1–2	1–3	1–2	0–3	0–1	1–2	2–1	2–2		0–4	0–2	1–3
Tre Fiori	7–0	1–3	3–0	2–1	1–2	0–1	1–0	1–2	4–0	2–0	3–0	1–4	4–0		1–1	0–2
Tre Penne	2–1	0–2	3–1	5–0	1–0	1–1	4–2	1–1	1–1	2–2	0–0	3–2	3–2	1–3		1–2
Virtus	2–0	1–3	3–0	3–0	2–0	1–0	1–0	1–1	5–2	2–1	2–1	1–1	2–0	1–1	2–0	

Source: Flashscore
Legend: Blue = home team win; Yellow = draw; Red = away team win.

== Conference League play-off ==
Teams placed 2nd-11th qualify for the Conference League play-off, with the winners earning the second and final place in the Conference League first qualifying round.

=== Bracket ===
First round
9	Murata	0
10	Faetano	1
8	Fiorentino	1
11	Juvenes/Dogana	1

Quarter-finals
2	La Fiorita	2	2	4
10	Faetano	1	0	1
6	Tre Penne	1	0	1
5	Cosmos	1	1	2
3	Tre Fiori	3	2	5
8	Fiorentino	1	0	1
4	Folgore	0	1	1
7	San Giovanni	1	1	2

Semi-finals
2	La Fiorita	0	0	0*
5	Cosmos	0	0	0
7	San Giovanni	1	1	2
3	Tre Fiori	2	1	3

Final
2	La Fiorita	1
3	Tre Fiori	0
Fourth place play-off
5	Cosmos	4
7	San Giovanni	2

==== First round ====
Teams placed 8th-11th entered the first round; teams placed 2nd-7th received a bye.

Team 1	Score	Team 2
30 April 2025
Murata (9th)	0–1	Faetano (10th)
Fiorentino (8th)	1–1	Juvenes/Dogana (11th)

==== Quarter-finals ====
The two first round winners and teams placed 2nd-7th entered the quarter-finals, held over two legs. The first legs were held on 3–4 May 2025, followed by the second legs on 6–7 May 2025.

Team 1	Agg.	Team 2	1st leg	2nd leg
Folgore (4th)	1–2	San Giovanni (6th)	0–1	1–1
Tre Penne (7th)	1–2	Cosmos (5th)	1–1	0–1
La Fiorita (2nd)	4–1	Faetano (10th)	2–1	2–0
Tre Fiori (3rd)	5–1	Fiorentino (8th)	3–1	2–0

==== Semi-finals ====
The four quarter-final winners entered the semi-finals, held over two legs. The first legs were held on 10 May, followed by the second legs on 14 May.

Team 1	Agg.	Team 2	1st leg	2nd leg
La Fiorita (2nd)	0–0	Cosmos (5th)	0–0	0–0
San Giovanni (6th)	2–3	Tre Fiori (3rd)	1–2	1–1

La Fiorita advances to the final of Conference League play-off due to the better position in the regular season.

==== Final ====
The final was held between the two semi-final winners.

17 May 2025

La Fiorita	1–0	Tre Fiori

San Marino Stadium, Serravalle
